= Antiporno =

- Promotional release poster
- アンチポルノ
- Directed by: Sion Sono
- Screenplay by: Sion Sono
- Produced by: Naoko Komuro; Sion Sono; Kiyoe Takage; Shin'ichi Takahashi; Tadashi Tanaka; Akira Yamamoto
- Starring: Ami Tomite; Mariko Tsutsui
- Cinematography: Maki Ito
- Edited by: Jun'ichi Itō
- Music by: Tomonobu Kikuchi
- Production companies: Django Film; Nikkatsu
- Distributed by: Nikkatsu
- Release dates: September 7, 2016 (L'Étrange Festival); January 28, 2017
- Running time: 76 minutes
- Country: Japan
- Language: Japanese

Antiporno (アンチポルノ), also known as Anti-Porno, is a 2016 Japanese drama film written and directed by Sion Sono. It was released by Nikkatsu as the fourth film in the reboot of its Roman Porno ("romantic pornography") series. Other directors involved in the series include Hideo Nakata, Akihiko Shiota, Kazuya Shiraishi, and Isao Yukisada.

== Plot ==
Kyōko is a renowned artist and writer trapped in a solitary gilded cage where she speaks to an apparition of her deceased sister, Taeko. Kyōko's older assistant, Noriko, arrives to help her prepare for an interview with a prominent lifestyle magazine. Wrestling with nausea and self-doubt, Kyōko alleviates her insecurities by subjecting her older assistant to a series of humiliation rituals. When the magazine team arrives, Kyōko does not relent on Noriko's sadistic torture, but instead exacerbates it, culminating in her stripping Noriko naked and ordering the other women to rape her.

A director yells "Cut!", revealing that the two women were playing roles in a pornographic film. Despite having assumed the role of the shy, submissive partner during the scene, Noriko's real-life personality is that of a high-strung, arrogant veteran actress who is livid at the amateur Kyōko's ineptitude. The director sexually assaults Kyōko backstage in an effort to prove that she is not a virgin and can convincingly fake pleasure; the other actresses eavesdrop on the encounter and laugh. Increasingly frustrated with Kyōko's lack of improvement, Noriko begins subjecting her to humiliation rituals mirroring those in the scripted scene. The layers of the two actresses' true personalities and Kyōko's background are revealed over the course of repeated performances of the scene.

The lines between the film and reality begin to blur as Kyōko begins to question when the director will end the take. In a flashback, Kyōko and Taeko nonchalantly discuss sex at the dinner table with her father and late mother. Taeko then declares that she is considering suicide and proceeds to convince a classmate to stab her to death. Both of these incidents appear to have traumatized Kyōko greatly.

While attempting another take of the scene, Kyōko suffers a breakdown, leading Noriko to angrily demand that she be fired and recast while the director wraps up filming for the day. Kyōko returns home and announces to her father and stepmother that she has been cast in a pornographic film. Despite their seemingly flippant attitude toward sex, both are horrified and implore her to quit, but Kyōko calls them out on their hypocrisy before attempting to seduce her father and begging him to take her virginity, to his horror and disgust; Kyōko imagines a film crew documenting the ordeal. When her father successfully fights her off, she asks the crew to follow her outside, where she asks the first man she sees if he will take her virginity. He casually agrees before taking her to a forest clearing, where he suddenly becomes aggressive despite Kyōko pleading with him to be gentle with her. She at first appears terrified as the man begins raping her, but quickly calms down and starts coaching him on what to do, having consensual sex that she seems to enjoy. The man leaves suddenly, and Kyōko finds that the crew have disappeared, leaving only a camera behind.

Kyōko's audition is then shown, with the director and crew proclaiming she will not be convincing as a "whore," then ordering her to strip. Kyōko proclaims that her naked body is not inherently sexual, and that she is hoping to be cast in a pornographic film as a means of sexualizing herself. The crew asks her a series of invasive questions, ultimately asking what her most painful memory is; she replies that it is Taeko's death.

The film is re-shot, with Noriko and Kyōko swapping roles. In the midst of the scene, a distraught Kyōko begins frantically crawling around and calling out for Taeko. Kyōko is then seen alone in a room, seemingly pitching the story about her being cast in the film as an idea for a novel. An alive and well Taeko delivers a birthday cake to her, which Kyōko repeatedly bashes her face into while ranting about Japan's patriarchy and the fact that women will never achieve true freedom. Brightly colored paint begins to rain from the ceiling, which Kyōko rolls around in while laughing hysterically. She turns to see her father and stepmother having sex, and, disturbed, begins crawling away and desperately screaming to find an exit.

== Cast ==
- Ami Tomite as Kyōko
- Mariko Tsutsui as Noriko
- Asami
- Fujiko
- Ami Fukuda
- Honoka Ishibashi
- Yūya Takayama

== Release and reception ==
The film premiered at the L'Étrange Festival in France on September 7, 2016, and was later released in Japan on January 28, 2017.

On review aggregator website Rotten Tomatoes, the film has an approval rating of 87% based on 15 reviews, with an average rating of 6.80/10. James Marsh of the South China Morning Post writes that "Sono's effort is easily the most ambitious entry yet in the series of re-imagined softcore entertainments. Not only does it challenge gender roles within the Japanese film industry – and in the country as a whole – but the film also attempts to deconstruct cinema as a voyeuristic narrative medium." Ela Bittencourt of Slant Magazine wrote: "Cruelty, masochism, parental abuse (in the painter's flashbacks) and schadenfreude of all kinds fuel this feverish op-art dream that turns on us at every corner."

Some critics praised the film for subverting Nikkatsu's reboot of Roman Porno by boldly critiquing and exposing the sexual exploitation of the film and pornography industries. Nathanael Hood writing for Mubi noted that, for Nikkatsu's reboot, Sono was a seemingly perfect choice. His previous films, especially Love Exposure, Suicide Club, and Tag, show a certain sexual obsession in the director's work. Hood said,

"Imagine Nikkatsu's surprise when Sono's contribution to the Reboot Project would end up being aggressively unsexy. Appropriately titled Antiporno, the film is almost Brechtian in its determination to fluster and confound its audience by stripping away successive layers of fantasy until all that's left is the cankerous soul of sex industry exploitation. It was a stroke of bawdy genius."

Other critics argued the film lacked nuance. Chuck Bowen of Slant Magazine said, "Sion Sono, allergic to subtlety, is terrified that we won't notice his detonation of Nikkatsu's sexploitation traditions."

== Literature ==
- Hjelm, Zara Luna (2021). "Embodying the sexed posthuman body of becoming in Sion Sono's Antiporno (アンチポルノ, 2016) and Mika Ninagawa's Helter Skelter (ヘルタースケルター, 2012)". Linköping University.
