= The Virgin Psychics =

- Film poster
- 映画 みんな!エスパーだよ!
- Directed by: Sion Sono
- Written by: Sion Sono
- Based on: Minna! Esper Dayo! by Kiminori Wakasugi
- Starring: Shōta Sometani; Elaiza Ikeda; Erina Mano
- Cinematography: Hajime Kanda
- Music by: Tomohide Harada
- Production company: TV Tokyo
- Distributed by: Gaga
- Release date: September 4, 2015 (Japan)
- Running time: 115 minutes
- Country: Japan
- Language: Japanese

The Virgin Psychics (映画 みんな!エスパーだよ!, Eiga Minna! Esper Dayo!) is a 2015 Japanese comedy-drama science fiction mystery film directed by Sion Sono. It is the third adaptation of the seinen manga series Minna! Esper Dayo! written and illustrated by Kiminori Wakasugi, following a 2013 TV series and a TV movie special earlier in 2015. It was released in Japan on September 4, 2015.

== Premise ==
Kamogawa Yoshirō is a teenage Japanese virgin whose life is changed by a cosmic event. While fantasizing about his dream girl, Yoshirō receives a cosmic blast while masturbating. At school he finds himself able to read other people's thoughts and joins a group of psychic virgins in order to defend the world from evil psychics using his newfound psychic powers.

== Cast ==
- Shōta Sometani as Yoshirō Kamogawa. Sometani reprises his role from the 2013 live-action TV series and specials.
- Elaiza Ikeda as Miyuki Hirano
- Erina Mano as Sae Asami. Mano reprises her role from the 2013 live-action TV series and specials.
- Mika Akizuki as Yuko
- Tokio Emoto as Yasu
- Motoki Fukami as Yosuke Enomoto
- Mizuki Hoshina as Taeko
- Rika Hoshina as Saya
- Ai Shinozaki as Keiko
- Tomomi Itano as Eri
- Megumi Kagurazaka as Ms. Akiyama
- Cyborg Kaori as Protester Sexy Cosplayer
- Anna Konno as Mitsuko Mitsui
- Reiya Masaki as Yabe Naoya
- Ijiri Okada as Yoshiro's Dad
- Izumi Okamura as Protester Sexy Cosplayer
- Sahel Rosa as Julie Babcock
- Tsutomu Sekine as Taeko's Partner
- Konona Shiba as Protester Sexy Cosplyer
- Airi Shimizu as Shizuka
- Rena Shimura as Mano
- Yuka Someya
- Makita Sports as Teru
- Maryjun Takahashi as Aiko Polnareff
- Kōhei Takeda as Topless Guy with Topless Ladies
- Ami Tomite as Akiko Kamiya
- Mariko Tsutsui as Ritsuko
- Ken Yasuda as Prof. Asami

== Production ==
It is Sion Sono's third adaptation of the manga source material Minna! Esper Dayo! by Kiminori Wakasugi. The first live-action drama adaptation of the manga premiered in April 2013 as a 12-part live-action TV drama. A live-action spinoff television special titled All Esper Dayo! SP aired in Japan on April 3, 2015. This theatrical adaptation, titled Eiga Minna! Esper Dayo! featured some differences in the members of the cast from those earlier television adaptations, most notably Elaiza Ikeda replacing Kaho as Miyuki Hirano.

== Release ==
The film was released in Japan on September 4, 2015, just a few months after Sion Sono's TV special All Esper Dayo! SP based on the manga. It was also featured at multiple international festivals, including the Busan International Film Festival on October 2, 2015, the Sitges Film Festival (where Sion Sono also presented Tag and Love & Peace) on October 11, 2015, the Buenos Aires Film Festival on April 21, 2016, the Future Film Festival in Italy on May 5, 2016, the Edinburgh International Film Festival on June 20, 2016, and the Eejanaika Toyohashi Film Festival on March 5, 2017.

== Reception ==
Critics generally found that the film was full of sexual innuendo and discussion but did not contain actual nudity or sex. Justin Chang of Variety.com called the film an "occasionally endearing, often supremely irritating movie" and ultimately found that it "is a bit like having a dog hump your leg for the better part of two hours; it's filthy and monotonous and fairly interminable, but after a while you've been so thoroughly numbed that you have to admit it's kind of sweet." Wendy Ide of Screen Daily wrote, "For all its cosplay sex slaves, mountains of blow up dolls and frenzied masturbation, this is as tame, and in many ways as innocent, as a Benny Hill sketch."
