= Tetsushi Tanaka =

Japanese actor

- 田中 哲司
- Born: February 18, 1966 (age 60); Suzuka, Mie, Japan
- Occupation: Actor
- Years active: 1995–present
- Spouse: Yukie Nakama (m. 2014)
- Children: 2

Tetsushi Tanaka (田中 哲司, Tanaka Tetsushi; born February 18, 1966 in Mie Prefecture) is a Japanese actor.

== Personal life ==
Tanaka married actress Yukie Nakama on September 18, 2014, after a six-year relationship. The couple have two sons, twin boys, born in June of 2018.

== Selected filmography ==
=== Film ===
- Get Up! (2003)
- One Missed Call (2004)
- Umizaru (2004)
- 69 (2004)
- Veronika Decides to Die (2005)
- Into a Dream (2005)
- Limit of Love: Umizaru (2005)
- Water Flower (2006)
- I Just Didn't Do It (2007)
- Exte (2007)
- Sakigake!! Otokojuku (2008)
- Happy Flight (2008)
- Rebirth (2011), Takehiro Akiyama
- Outrage Beyond (2012), Funaki
- Midsummer's Equation (2013), Keiichi Esaki
- Like Father, Like Son (2013)
- Flying Colors (2015), Sayaka's Father
- The Tokyo Night Sky Is Always the Densest Shade of Blue (2017), Iwashita
- Love At Least (2018)
- Louder!: Can't Hear What You're Singin', Wimp (2018)
- Ten Years Japan (2018)
- The House Where the Mermaid Sleeps (2018), Dr. Shindō
- Day and Night (2019), Ryohei Miyake
- The Journalist (2019), Tada
- Stolen Identity 2 (2020)
- Signal the Movie (2021)
- Ride or Die (2021), Yoshio Akiba
- Your Turn to Kill: The Movie (2021), Masakazu Minami
- Tombi: Father and Son (2022)
- Shin Ultraman (2022), Tatsuhiko Munakata
- The Last 10 Years (2022), Dr. Hirata
- The Parades (2024), Tanaka
- Faceless (2024)
- Dollhouse (2025), Kanda
- Emergency Interrogation Room: The Final Movie (2025), Katsutoshi Kajiyama
- The Man Who Carried the Voices of August (2026), Mitsuru Kagawa

=== Television ===
- Sanbiki ga Kiru! (2002)
- Shinsengumi! (2004), Matsumoto Ryōjun
- The Eldest Boy and His Three Elder Sisters (2003), Masaru Takagi
- Himitsu no Hanazono (2007)
- Last Friends (2008)
- Bloody Monday (2008)
- Ryōmaden (2010) - Tokugawa Yoshinobu
- Diplomat Kosaku Kuroda (2011), Kazuhiko Niida
- Penance (2012)
- Gunshi Kanbei (2014), Araki Murashige
- Bitter Blood (2014), Hisashi Koga
- Emergency Interrogation Room (2014–2025), Katsutoshi Kajiyama
- Love Song (2016), Taizō Masumura
- Crisis (2017), Mitsunari Yoshinaga
- Manpuku (2019)
- Two Homelands (2019), Orson Aikawa
- Your Turn to Kill (2019)
- Ranman (2023), Seiichi Tokunaga
- The Man Who Carried the Voices of August (2025), Mitsuru Kagawa
- Last Samurai Standing (2025), Maejima Hisoka
- Brothers in Arms (2026), Andō Morinari

== Plays ==
- Hamlet (1995)
- A Midsummer Night's Dream (1996)
- Amor Vincit Omnia (1998)
- MacBeth (1999)
- Waiting for Godot (2000)
- A Streetcar Named Desire (2001-2003)
- Wuthering Heights (2002)
- Das Schloss (2005)
