= The Whispering Star =

- Film poster
- ひそひそ星
- Directed by: Sion Sono
- Screenplay by: Sion Sono
- Starring: Megumi Kagurazaka; Kenji Endō; Yūto Ikeda; Kōko Mori
- Cinematography: Hideo Yamamoto
- Edited by: Jun'ichi Itô
- Release dates: September 14, 2015 (TIFF); 2016 (Japan)
- Running time: 101 minutes
- Country: Japan

The Whispering Star (ひそひそ星) is a 2015 Japanese science fiction film directed by Sion Sono. The film was released in 2015 and, in March 2016, was played during the Environmental Film Festival at the National Museum of American History, Warner Brothers Theater, in Washington, DC.

== Plot ==
In an unspecified future, an A.I. cyborg delivery woman—Yoko Suzuki (Megumi Kagurazaka)—travels through the galaxy delivering packages to the few humans still scattered around, who are now living on different earth-like planets showing clear signs of environmental disasters. Through her encounters with the delivery recipients Yoko will learn to understand and appreciate human emotions.

== Cast ==
- Megumi Kagurazaka
- Kenji Endō
- Yūto Ikeda
- Kōko Mori

== Production ==
The Whispering Star was the first film produced by Sion Sono's production company Sion Production. Filming took place in Fukushima Prefecture. Apart from one scene, where the main character is on her way delivering her first package, it is a black-and-white film.

== Reception ==
Richard Gray of thereelbits.com gave the film 4 out of 5 stars, calling it “a wholly unique experience, and an amazing accomplishment in visually-driven storytelling.”

=== Accolades ===
The film won the NETPAC Award for World or International Asian Film Premiere at the 2015 Toronto International Film Festival.

== Trivia ==
At various times throughout the movie, Marin Marais's Tombeau pour Mr. de Lully (from the Deuxième Livre de Pièces de Viole) is heard. This is a recurring leitmotiv in Sono's movies, being also used at key points in his previous movie Guilty of Romance.
