= Megumi Satō =

Megumi Satō may refer to:

- Megumi Sato (actress) (佐藤 めぐみ, born 1984), Japanese actress and television personality
- Megumi Sato (athlete) (佐藤 恵, born 1966), Japanese high jumper
