= Visitor Q =

2001 Japanese erotic horror film

- Japanese theatrical poster
- Directed by: Takashi Miike
- Written by: Itaru Era
- Starring: Kenichi Endō; Shungicu Uchida; Kazushi Watanabe
- Cinematography: Hideo Yamamoto
- Edited by: Yasushi Shimamura
- Music by: Kōji Endō
- Distributed by: CineRocket
- Release date: 17 March 2001
- Running time: 84 min
- Country: Japan
- Language: Japanese
- Budget: ¥7,000,000 (~$60,400)

Visitor Q (ビジターＱ, Bijitā Kyū) is a 2001 Japanese erotic black comedy-horror film directed by Takashi Miike. It was filmed as the sixth and final part of the Love Cinema series consisting of six straight-to-video releases by independent filmmakers via a brief but exclusive run at the minuscule Shimokitazawa cinema in Tokyo. The six films were conceived as low budget exercises to explore the benefits afforded by the low-cost digital video medium such as the increased mobility of the camera and the low-lighting conditions available to the filmmakers.

Visitor Q often replicates the style of documentary footage and home movies, which invokes a sense of realism that contradicts the film's more bizarre elements and black comedy. The film's plot is often compared to Pier Paolo Pasolini's Teorema, in which a strange visitor to a wealthy family seduces the maid, the son, the mother, the daughter, and finally the father, before leaving a few days after, subsequently changing their lives.

== Plot ==
Young prostitute Miki Yamazaki attempts to persuade her father Kiyoshi into sexual intercourse. Though disgusted, Kiyoshi consents, planning to videotape the scene for a documentary he is preparing on Japanese youths, and Miki charges him 50,000 yen. When Kiyoshi suffers from premature ejaculation, Miki mocks him as a "minuteman", and then doubles her price because of his failure.

Sometime later, Kiyoshi waits at a local train station, while a man wearing a red shirt, the titular Visitor Q, is smoking a cigarette outside. As Kiyoshi ignores his presence, the Visitor grabs a rock from the ground, opens a window and hits Kiyoshi over the head with it, incapacitating him. While Miki's mother, Keiko, is working on a jigsaw puzzle, her teenage son Takuya arrives, unhappy with the toothbrush she bought him, and starts throwing things at the already-broken apartment walls before striking her with a rug beater. Later, bullies from Takuya's school approach the house and shoot fireworks through his bedroom window, forcing him to cower on the floor. Meanwhile, Keiko prepares and injects a dose of heroin.

Returning from work, Kiyoshi re-encounters the Visitor, who hits him with a rock for a second time. At Kiyoshi's residence, Keiko serves them dinner, during which Kiyoshi announces the Visitor's temporary lodging arrangement. Takuya arrives and starts beating her in front of the unsurprised and unbothered pair. Later, Kiyoshi discovers that a group of teenagers raped Takuya. Heading to work the next day, Kiyoshi notices and films Takuya being beaten and robbed by some of his schoolmates, appearing very pleased with the footage. He meets with a female co-worker named Asako Murata, who believes he is going too far in his work. Meanwhile, a bruised and limping Keiko is working as a prostitute. Upon returning home from buying extra heroin at a park, she discovers her jigsaw puzzle pieces have been arranged in a trail stretching through the house, ending at a photograph of Miki. The Visitor personally introduces himself to her and instructs her how to lactate for emotional and sexual pleasure.

Much happier than usual afterwards, Keiko prepares a lavish dinner for the whole family. A sullen Takuya, however, throws a bowl of hot soup at her face. Unwilling to tolerate disrespect, she fetches a carving knife and then throws it at him with newfound resolve, terrifiying him and pleasing everyone else. Takuya's schoolmates assault his house with fireworks, which Kiyoshi exhilaratedly videotapes. Keiko and the Visitor resume eating peacefully while a terrified Takuya cowers as shards of glass and fragments of wood dislodged by the fireworks are strewn across the hallway.

Kiyoshi, accompanied by the Visitor and Asako in his car, tapes Takuya being bullied the following day. Exasperated with Kiyoshi, she departs, but he pursues and sexually assaults her while the Visitor apathetically and neutrally tapes the scene. After unintentionally choking Asako fatally, Kiyoshi takes her body back home and stores her in the greenhouse. He dispatches the still-filming Visitor to get garbage bags from Keiko, but she undresses in front of the Visitor, revealing herself clad in a garbage bag. She then self-lactates, with mass quantities of milk covering the floor.

Concurrently, Kiyoshi tapes himself marking Asako's body with a marker pen for dismemberment. Aroused, he has sexual intercourse with it, but then amazingly notices she is leaking fluids. However, he discovers his hand is covered in feces, and his penis is trapped inside the corpse due to rigor mortis. Keiko notices and hurriedly buys several large bottles of vinegar, which she empties into the bathtub along with him and Asako's corpse. When this fails, she frees him with a shot of heroin.

While the parents are dismembering Asako, Takuya appears in the front yard, tortured by his pursuing schoolmates. The parents rush out, delightfully murdering the bullies. Later, Takuya, lying on the floor in the milk puddle, thanks the Visitor for uniting his family via his unique brand of chaos. The Visitor departs, and while walking down a nearby street, he encounters a propositioning Miki and readies his rock. Bruised on the head, Miki returns home to find Keiko wearing a tarpaulin in the greenhouse, with Kiyoshi nursing from her breast. She smiles and joins them.

== Cast ==
- Kenichi Endō as Kiyoshi Yamazaki, the father
- Shungicu Uchida as Keiko Yamazaki, the mother
- Fujiko as Miki Yamazaki, the daughter
- Jun Mutō as Takuya Yamazaki, the son
- Shōko Nakahara as Asako Murata
- Kazushi Watanabe as Visitor Q
