= Into a Dream =

- Directed by: Sion Sono
- Written by: Sion Sono
- Starring: Tetsushi Tanaka; Yuna Natsuo; Jun Murakami; Joe Odagiri
- Release date: June 11, 2005
- Running time: 103 minutes
- Country: Japan
- Language: Japanese

Into a Dream (夢の中へ, Yume no Naka e) is a 2005 Japanese black comedy drama film written and directed by Sion Sono. It screened at the 2009 Hong Kong Asian Film Festival. The title comes from the 1973 single by Yosui Inoue.

== Plot ==
The movie focuses on the misadventures of low-profile theater troupe actor Mutsugoro Suzuki who begins a surreal journey back to his hometown, marked by his quest to find the person responsible for infecting him with a sexually transmitted disease. As he travels down to his parents' house for a family reunion, his dreams become more and more intrusive. Eventually, after reuniting with his father, younger sister and friends, his dreams eat away at his sanity and he finds himself unable to differentiate between his dreams and reality. Thus, the movie ends with Suzuki abruptly leaving his family reunion and running down the evening road screaming and singing "Into a Dream."

== Reception ==
The film has been presented as "A tender addition to Sono's body of work (and a) moving look at fulfillment and fears in contemporary Japan."

== Analysis ==
A retrospective review explains that "If Suicide Club announced a transition to a new filmmaking cycle for Sono, one where the director's work became more genre-oriented and commercially viable, then it's hard not to read Into a Dream as a self-lacerating consideration of that decision."
