= Joe Odagiri =

Japanese actor (born 1976)

- オダギリ ジョー
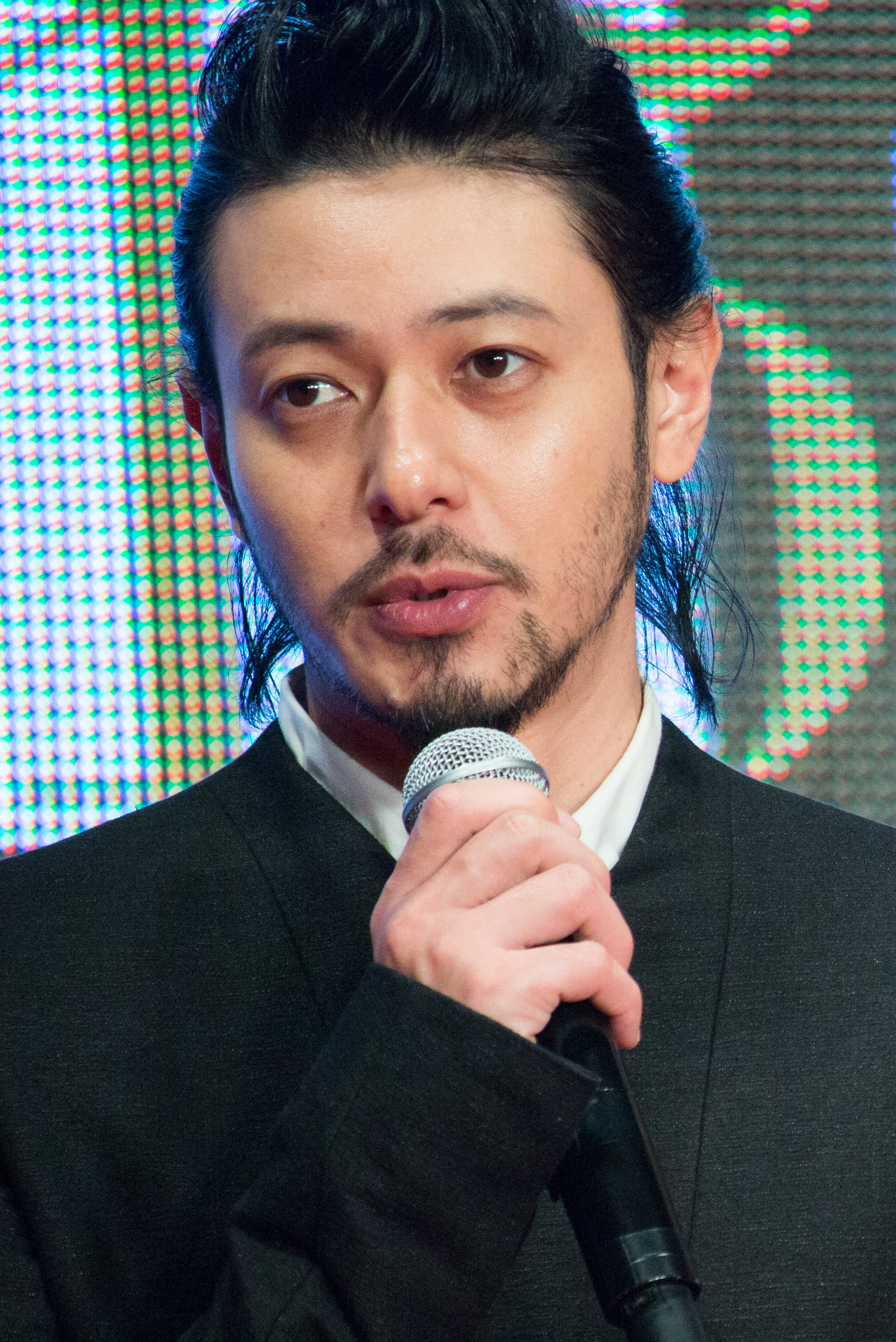
- Odagiri at the 28th Tokyo International Film Festival
- Born: Jō Odagiri (小田切 譲, Odagiri Jō); February 16, 1976 (age 50); Tsuyama, Okayama, Japan
- Other name: Odajo
- Occupations: Actor, musician
- Years active: 1999–present
- Spouse: Yuu Kashii (m. 2008)
- Children: 3
- Website: dongyu.co.jp

Jō Odagiri (Japanese: 小田切 譲, romanized: Odagiri Jō; born 16 February 1976), better known by his stage name Joe Odagiri (オダギリ ジョー, Odagiri Jō), is a Japanese actor. He is most famous for portraying Yusuke Godai, the titular hero of the 2000 tokusatsu series Kamen Rider Kuuga.

== Early life and education ==
Joe Odagiri was born February 16, 1976, in Tsuyama, Okayama prefecture. Though he was accepted by Kochi University, he turned it down for an opportunity to study in the United States. He had originally intended to study film directing at California State University, Fresno, but mistakes in the application process landed him in acting classes. He often says that Tokyo is his second hometown.

== Filmography (as actor) ==
=== Television ===
Year	Title	Role	Notes	Ref.
2000	Kamen Rider Kuuga	Yusuke Godai	Lead role	
2001	OL Visual Kei			
2001	A Fragrance of Jealousy	Asai Makoto		
2002	First Time	Atsushi		
2002	Searchin' for My Polestar	Kisaki Takeshi		
2002	Transparent		Lead role	
2003	Face	Nishijima Kousuke	Lead role	
2003	Song of the Canefields	Yoshioka		
2003	Beginner	Shun	Lead role	
2004	The Violin Over Seas	Aikawa Sensei		
2004	Shinsengumi!	Saitō Hajime	Taiga drama	
2005	Grumpy Gene	Katsuta Hayato		
2006–19	Time Limit Investigator	Kiriyama Shuichiro	Lead role; 3 seasons	
2008	My Younger Sister	Egami Mei	Lead role	
2008	Midnight Diner	Katagiri		
2010	Atami no Sousakan		Lead role	
2010	A School Behind Bars	Ishikawa Junpei	Lead role	
2011	Midnight Diner 2	Katagiri		
2013	Yae's Sakura	Joseph Hardy Neesima	Taiga drama	
2014	Rivers Edge Okawabata Detective Agency	Takeshi Muraki	Lead role	
2014	The Thorns of Alice	Nishikado		
2015	Keisei Saimin no Otoko Part 1	Takahashi Korekiyo	Lead role	
2015	To Give a Dream	Murano		
2016	Sleepeeer Hit!	Kei Iokibe		
2016	Midnight Diner: Tokyo Stories	Kogure		
2018	We Are Rockets!	Tarō Urushido		
2021	My Dear Exes	Hiroshi Takanashi		
2021–22	Come Come Everybody	Jōichirō "Joe" Ōtsuki	Asadora	
2022	Atom's Last Shot	Akihiku Okitsu		
2027	Dangerous	Jun'ichirō Tanizaki		

=== Film ===
Year	Title	Role	Notes	Ref.
1999	Jubaku: Spellbound			
2001	Platonic Sex	Toshimi Iwasaki		
2003	Azumi	Bijomaru Mogami		
2003	Bright Future	Yuuji Nimura	Lead role	
2004	Out of This World	Shozo Ikeshima		
2004	Blood and Bones	Takeshi		
2004	Black Kiss	Joker Jono		
2005	Pacchigi!	Sakazaki		
2005	In the Pool	Tetsuya Taguchi	Lead role	
2005	Into a Dream	Kōji		
2005	Hazard	Shin	Lead role	
2005	House of Himiko	Haruhiko Kishimoto	Lead role	
2005	Shinobi: Heart Under Blade	Gennosuke Kouga	Lead role	
2005	Scrap Heaven	Tetsu		
2005	Princess Raccoon	Amechiyo	Lead role	
2006	Big River	Teppei	Lead role	
2006	The Uchōten Hotel	Ukon		
2006	Retribution	Dr. Takagi		
2006	The Pavillion Salamandre	Hoichi Tobishima		
2006	Sway	Takeru Hayakawa	Lead role	
2007	Mushishi	Ginko	Lead role	
2007	Tokyo Tower: Mom and Me, and Sometimes Dad	Masawa Nakagawa	Lead role	
2007	Sad Vacation	Goto		
2007	Adrift in Tokyo	Fumiya Takemura	Lead role	
2009	Plastic City	Kirin		
2009	Dream	Jin		
2009	The Warrior and the Wolf	Lu Shenkang	Chinese film	
2009	Air Doll	Sonoda		
2011	I Wish	Kenji		
2011	Poongsan	North Korean border guard 1	Cameo	
2011	My Way	Tatsuo Hasegawa	Lead role, South Korean film	
2013	The Great Passage	Masashi Nishioka		
2013	Real	Editor		
2013	Mr. Go	The Owner of Chunichi Dragons	Cameo, South Korean film	
2013	Human Trust	Kugenuma		
2013	Present for You	Shigeru Kajiwara		
2014	The World of Kanako	Detective Aikawa		
2015	Foujita	Tsuguharu Foujita	Lead role	
2016	Over the Fence	Yoshio Shiraiwa	Lead role	
2016	Her Love Boils Bathwater	Kazuhiro		
2017	Ernesto	Freddy Maymura	Lead role	
2017	Pumpkin and Mayonnaise	Hagio		
2017	The White Girl	Sakamoto	Lead role	
2018	Room Laundering	Gorō Ikazuchi		
2018	Human, Space, Time and Human	Eve's boyfriend	South Korean film	
2019	Saturday Fiction		Chinese film	
2021	The Asian Angel	Tōru Aoki		
2021	A Day with No Name	Akihito Ono		
2021	We Made a Beautiful Bouquet	Kōhei Kaji		
2021	A Madder Red	Yōichi Tanaka		
2022	What to Do with the Dead Kaiju?	Bruce		
2022	It's All My Fault	Sakamoto		
2023	Yoko			
2023	The Moon	Shohei		
2024	90 Years Old – So What?			
2025	The Solitary Gourmet	proprietor of the Chinese noodle restaurant Sincérité		
2025	Gosh!!	Oliver	Lead role, also director, writer and editor	
2025	On Summer Sand	Osamu	Lead role, also producer	
2025	Bring Him Down to a Portable Size	Riko's brother		
2026	The Samurai and the Prisoner	Kori Juemon		
2026	Satoko Always	Kengo Muramoto		
2026	The Canary's Lullaby	Komiya	Taiwanese-Japanese film	

=== Anime ===
- Zaion: I Wish You Were Here (2001), Yuji Tamiya

== Filmography (as director) ==
Year	Title	Notes	Ref.
2019	They Say Nothing Stays the Same		
2025	Gosh!!		

== Bibliography ==
=== Books ===
- Joe Odagiri: Sweater Book (2000)
- Odagirism (2001)

== Discography ==
=== Albums ===
- Toto (2020)
- Hardy (2018)
- Cherry and blueberries (2016)

== See also ==
- Odagiri effect – a television phenomenon named after Joe Odagiri which first occurred in Kamen Rider Kuuga.
