= Megumi Sato (actress) =

Japanese actress (born 1984)

- Born: November 17, 1984 (age 41); Tokyo, Japan
- Occupation: Actress
- Years active: 2001–2025

Megumi Sato (佐藤 めぐみ, Satō Megumi; born November 17, 1984) is a former Japanese actress.

== Career ==
Sato appeared in Sion Sono's 2007 thriller film Exte. She played a supporting role in Mikio Satake's 2008 debut film Class Reunion.

== Filmography ==
=== Films ===
- Winning Pass (2004)
- Angel in the Box (2004)
- Peanuts (2006)
- Angel (2006)
- Green Mind, Metal Bats (2006)
- Exte (2007) as Yuki Morita
- Cyborg She (2008)
- L: Change the WorLd (2008) as Misawa Hatsune
- Kung Fu Kun (2008)
- Hana Yori Dango Final (2008)
- Class Reunion (2008) as Megumi
- Happy Flight (2008)
- Kamogawa Horumo (2009)
- Kamisama Help! (2010)
- After the Flowers (2010)
- Milocrorze (2011)
- The Castle of Crossed Destinies (2012)
- Sue, Mai & Sawa: Righting the Girl Ship (2013)
- The Complex (2013)

=== Television ===
- Kinpachi-sensei (2001)
- Medaka (2004)
- H2 (2005) as Satomi Nakata
- Hana Yori Dango (2005) as Sakurako Sanjo
- Aru Ai no Uta (2006) as Shiami Shirai
- Sunadokei (2007) as Ann Minase
- Taiyo no Uta (2006) as Misaki Matsumae
- Chiritotechin (2007) as Kiyomi Wada
- Hana Yori Dango Returns (2007) as Sakurako Sanjo
- Shukujo (2008)
- The Hippocratic Oath (2016)
- Lost Man Found (2022)
