= Hazard (2005 film) =

- Festival poster
- Directed by: Sion Sono
- Written by: Sion Sono; oshi Kumakiri
- Produced by: Takeshi Suzuki
- Starring: Jo Odagiri; Jai West; Motoki Fukami; Hiroyuki Ikeuchi
- Cinematography: Hiro Yanagida
- Edited by: Shuichi Kakesu
- Music by: Tomohide Harada
- Distributed by: Evokative Films; Eleven Arts
- Release dates: November 5, 2005 (Sapporo Film Festival)
- Running time: 103 minutes
- Countries: Japan; United States
- Languages: Japanese; English

Hazard is a 2005 Japanese-American film mostly shot in New York City, written and directed by Sion Sono, starring Joe Odagiri and Jai West. It is the story of three youths who attempt to avenge their rights in a society of criminals and thugs.

== Synopsis ==
Shin (Jo Odagiri), a Japanese university student, finds a book with a section about the hazards to be found in New York City. Otherwise leading a boring life, he eagerly heads to New York but soon finds out the hazards are true when he is mugged. Two Japanese-American punks, an outgoing thief named Lee (Jai West) and his shy sidekick Takeda (Motoki Fukami), help him out after the mugging, and together the three begin a life of excitement and danger. In the end, that gets them in trouble with the police, resulting in a death. Shin ultimately goes back to Japan with a new thirst for life.

== Cast ==
- Jo Odagiri as Shin
- Jai West as Lee
- Motoki Fukami as Takeda
- Hiroyuki Ikeuchi as Won
- Rin Kurana
- Sayako Hagiwara
- Clark Saturn

== Reception ==
Critical reception for the film was mixed to positive. Twitch Film praised the film, writing that director Sono's "grunge fantasy of New York is built up from impressions of the city through early Scorsese pictures makes no bones of its wish-fulfillment intent." They made note of the film being shot "with long hand-held takes and an improvised feel of perpetual motion," and making use of non-actors in supporting roles to give the film a sense of vérité style "cleverly subverted to full blown fantasy." Asia Pacific Arts called Hazard a "gritty, bilingual (even bipolar) film". Film Threat also praised the film, writing that even with director Sono not liking the film and with his feeling it was the least of his works, the reviewer felt the film was a "brilliant" and "extremely well made romp through the criminal NYC underworld."

However, Japan Times overall panned the film, saying that the movie "trades on tired cliches of American (or rather pre-Giuliani New York) criminality and racism, while betraying attitudes close to those it is ostensibly condemning".

== Release ==
The film was shot guerilla style in New York City in 2002, but did not have theatrical release in Japan until 2006. The film debuted at the Sapporo Film Festival on November 5, 2005, and had theatrical release in Japan on November 11, 2006, and in South Korea on April 19, 2007. It screened at the Fantasia Film Festival in Canada on July 9, 2007 and at the Lyon Asiexpo Film Festival in France on November 9, 2007. Its most recent festival screening was at the Torino Film Festival in Italy on November 27, 2011.

=== DVD ===
The American DVD features Japanese and English dialogue with optional English and French subtitles. DVD extras include a "making-of" featurette (in Japanese only), a video interview with the director, and a booklet containing a written interview in English.
