= Love Cinema =

Japanese film series

Love Cinema (ラブシネマ) is a series of Japanese films by CineRocket, it consists of six straight-to-video releases by independent filmmakers via a brief but exclusive run at the minuscule Shimokitazawa cinema in Tokyo. The six films were conceived as low budget exercises to explore the benefits afforded by the low-cost Digital Video medium such as the increased mobility of film and the low-lighting conditions available to the filmmakers.

All six volumes are produced by Reiko Arakawa and Susumu Nakajima with Akira Saitō and Hisanori Endō serving as executive producers on all six volumes.

Each film are officially titled as Love Cinema Vol. [number]: [Title of film]

Volume	English title	Native spelling		Director	Runtime (minutes)	Release date
1	Tokyo Trash Baby	東京ゴミ女	Tokyo gomi onna	Ryuichi Hiroki	88	2000
2	Amen, Somen and Rugger Men!	絵里に首ったけ	Eri ni kubittake	Mitsuhiro Mihara	85	4 November 2000
3	Enclosed Pain	閉じる日	Tojiru hi	Isao Yukisada	91	25 November 2000
4	Stake Out	張り込み	Harikomi	Tetsuo Shinohara	79	2001
5	Gips	ギプス	Gipusu	Akihiko Shiota	83	2001
6	Visitor Q	ビジターQ	Bijitā Kyū	Takashi Miike	84	10 March 2001
