= Strange Circus =

- Theatrical release poster
- Directed by: Sion Sono
- Written by: Sion Sono
- Produced by: Toshiaki Nakazawa
- Starring: Masumi Miyazaki; Issei Ishida
- Cinematography: Yuichiro Otsuka
- Edited by: Junichi Ito
- Music by: Sion Sono
- Release date: December 24, 2005 (Japan)
- Running time: 108 minutes
- Country: Japan
- Language: Japanese

Strange Circus (Japanese: 奇妙なサーカス, Hepburn: Kimyō na sākasu) is a 2005 Japanese horror drama film written and directed by Sion Sono.

A narrated fiction presents the story of school principal Ozawa Gozo, whose family becomes undermined by incest, suicide, and murder. This narrative is contained within a frame story written by wheelchair-using novelist Taeko. Taeko is assisted by Yuji, a young man who secretly seeks to uncover the possible origins of this story within Taeko's past, and to learn the mysteries of a locked room in her apartment.

== Plot ==
At the titular Strange Circus, the master of ceremonies offers the audience a chance to be placed in a guillotine. He brings a young girl onstage and asks her if she fears death; she says she has been destined to die from birth.

This sequence is then revealed to be a dream being had by twelve-year-old Mitsuko Ozawa, who awakens in a panic and enters her parents' bedroom to discover them having sex. She is spotted by her father, Gozo. The following night, Gozo locks Mitsuko in a cello case, forcing her to witness him have sex with her mother, Sayuri. He then coerces Sayuri into the cello case, where she is forced to watch Gozo rape Mitsuko.

Following the incident, Sayuri becomes physically abusive towards Mitsuko out of jealousy. During one particularly violent altercation, Mitsuko fatally pushes Sayuri down the stairs. Following Sayuri's death, Mitsuko's sanity begins to decline, and she struggles to separate her identity from her mother's. Mitsuko eventually attempts suicide by jumping off a roof; she survives, but sustains injuries that require her to use a wheelchair.

This is all then revealed to be a story being written by reclusive, paraplegic novelist Taeko Mitsuzawa. Taeko's editor encourages Taeko's assistant, Yûji, to investigate Taeko's life to uncover the truth behind her paralysis, which both men suspect to be a ruse, and a mysterious red door in her apartment, which she keeps perpetually locked and forbids anyone to enter. Taeko eventually confides to Yûji that she is the "Mitsuko" character she consistently writes about, and that the novel is a retelling of her own abusive upbringing. When Yûji compares being sexually abused to having one's limbs amputated, Taeko decides to make Mitsuko an amputee at the end of the novel, and agrees to Yûji's suggestion to make Gozo an amputee as well. Behind the red door in Taeko's apartment, she inserts food through a peephole in a cello case. Yûji distracts her long enough to sneak into the room, calling her and ordering her to return to her childhood home once she is out of the house. She returns to the room to find the cello case empty.

Taeko arrives at a home identical to the one Mitsuko grew up in. Yûji takes her upstairs, where she finds a bloodied Gozo, alive but bound in chains and missing all of his limbs. It is revealed that Taeko is actually Sayuri, and that it was Mitsuko who was thrown down the stairs, though she survived the fall and was subsequently placed into foster care to escape her dysfunctional family. Sayuri, overwhelmed with guilt, repressed the memory and deluded herself into believing herself to be Mitsuko. She also pushed Gozo down the stairs after discovering his multiple infidelities, resulting in him becoming unable to walk. After finishing her first novel, Sayuri adopted the moniker Taeko, stole Gozo's wheelchair, and kept him in the cello case.

Yûji reveals himself to be an older Mitsuko, having had a sex change. He procures a chainsaw, planning to sever Taeko's limbs. She awakens screaming in a hotel room next to Yûji, and asks for her wheelchair, but he claims to not know what she is talking about. When she stands up, he insists she had never been paralyzed. She then awakens again in Mitsuko's house, chained up in bed next to Gozo. Yûji stands over her with the chainsaw, laughing.

Back at the Strange Circus, the MC presents Sayuri with her head in the guillotine, and removes his mask to reveal himself as Gozo. Other figures from Taeko's life are present, including her editor, his brothers, a teenaged Mitsuko, Gozo's lovers, a young Mitsuko, and Yûji, all of whom give her a standing ovation. Gozo wishes her well, and the guillotine's blade drops.

== Cast ==
- Masumi Miyazaki as Sayuri Ozawa / Taeko Mitsuzawa
- Issei Ishida as Yûji Tamiya
- Rie Kuwana as twelve-year-old Mitsuko Ozawa
- Seiko Iwaido as teenage Mitsuko Ozawa
- Fujiko
- Madame Regine
- Tomorowo Taguchi as Taeko's Editor
- Hiroshi Ohguchi as Gozo Ozawa

== Reception ==
Russell Edwards of Variety wrote that the film "shocks, provokes but ultimately bores with its tasteless indulgences" and that it "will be most at home at midnight fest sidebars, or anywhere else where a trash aesthetic is embraced."
