= I Am Keiko =

- Theatrical release poster
- 桂子ですけど
- Directed by: Sion Sono
- Written by: Sion Sono
- Release date: 1997
- Running time: 61 minutes
- Country: Japan
- Language: Japanese

I Am Keiko (Japanese: 桂子ですけど, Hepburn: Keiko Desu Kedo) is a 1997 Japanese drama written and directed by Sion Sono.

== Plot ==
Keiko, the protagonist, turns 22 in three weeks. She lives in Tokyo and works as a waiter. She mourns her father, who had recently died from cancer. Approaching her birthday, she decides to stay in her room and memorize every single moment. Most of the scenes show Keiko in her apartment, though later she goes out and walks through the city into a snowy field.

== Reception ==
One commentator says that the movie is highly visual and poetic, and that it contemplates on the nature of time and loneliness.

After screening at the 29th Torino Film Festival, it was described by Italian critic Luca Calderini as "an example of poetry in images".

The reviewer Carson Lund calls the movie a "tightly wound and endlessly suggestive cinematic artifact".
