= All Esper Dayo! SP =

- Film poster
- みんな!エスパーだよ!番外編 ～エスパー、都へ行く～
- Based on: Minna! Esper Dayo! by Kiminori Wakasugi
- Written by: Sion Sono; Shinichi Tanaka
- Directed by: Sion Sono
- Starring: Shōta Sometani
- Music by: Tomohide Harada
- Country of origin: Japan
- Original language: Japanese

Production
- Producers: Abe Masashi; Moriya Takeshi
- Cinematography: Hajime Kanda
- Running time: 52 minutes
- Production company: TV Tokyo

Original release
- Release: April 3, 2015

All Esper Dayo! SP (みんな!エスパーだよ!番外編 ～エスパー、都へ行く～, Minna! Esper dayo! Bangaihen ~Esper, miyako e iku~) is a 2015 Japanese comedy-drama science fiction mystery television special directed by Sion Sono. It continues the story from the 2013 TV series adaptation of the seinen manga series Minna! Esper Dayo! written and illustrated by Kiminori Wakasugi. Sion Sono later directed a theatrical adaptation of the source material, released as The Virgin Psychics (2015).

== Plot ==
After being sent back to Tokyo by her father, Sae Asami sends a text message to Kamogawa Yoshirō asking for help. Together with Yabe, Enomoto, and Mr. Teru, Yoshirō goes to Tokyo, where he infiltrates her high school. Shizuka Tachibana, a student at the school, tells him about a conflict between three different groups at the school, explaining that the male students formerly at the school have left in fear. Yoshirō is convinced that Sae Asami is caught up in the conflict and seeks to help her. On the second day, Yoshirō already finds that Yabe, Enomoto, and Mr. Teru have each been seduced by one of the three different groups.

Sae Asami is found but she insists that she has not been kidnapped and that she is doing fine. Yoshirō calls her father, Dr. Asami, and tells him that Sae's homeroom teacher Mr. Kajimoto says that Sae was merely missing school due to a cold. Dr. Asami tells Yoshirō that Sae's homeroom teacher is supposed to be Mr. Fukikoshi and explains that Mr. Kajimoto is an academic rival who is jealous of Dr. Asami's newfound fame following the discovery of the psychics.

Sae Asami and Shizuka Tachibana get into a fight over Yoshirō in a classroom and are caught by the three groups, who tie them up and rub them with toy cars and mochi that they use to induce arousal. Yoshirō, Yabe, Enomoto, and Mr. Teru confront the girls. The girls offer to take their virginity and the Yabe, Enomoto, and Mr. Teru are tempted by the offer but Yoshirō reminds them that this will cause them to lose their psychic powers and convinces them to help him protect the world instead. The girls attempt to take their virginity by force but the boys use their powers to distract and frighten the girls.

They find Sae Asami in the gymnasium and untie her. Mr. Kajimoto and Shizuka Tachibana enter and Shizuka explains that she helped to set up the encounter in order to aid her father, Mr. Kajimoto, whose career as a researcher was damaged due to Dr. Asami's discovery of psychics. Dr. Asami and Akiyama Takako arrive and Akiyama Takako uses a newfound power to force the end credits to roll early, eliminating Mr. Kajimoto's opportunity to explain his plan for revenge. Enomoto appears on stage in a leather fetish outfit in his attempt to confront Mr. Kajimoto but finds that Mr. Kajimoto and Shizuka Tachibana have already left. The girls from the school appear again to tempt Enomoto but Akiyama Takako uses her power once more to finally run the end credits.

== Cast ==
- Shōta Sometani as Yoshirō Kamogawa
- Erina Mano as Sae Asami
- Rie Kitahara as Shizuka Tachibana
- Makita Sports as Nagano Terumitsu a.k.a. Mr. Teru
- Motoki Fukami as Yōsuke Enomoto
- Reiya Masaki as Yabe Naoya
- Ken Yasuda as Prof. Asami
- Megumi Kagurazaka as Akiyama Takako
- Manami Hashimoto as Haruka
- Jin Katagiri as Teacher Yukio Kajimoto
- Yuki Sakurai as Saeko
- Aki Hiraoka as Karina
- Maki Sawa as Rika
- Dai Hasegawa
- Yukimasa Tanimoto
- Miko Haruno

== Production ==
Kaho, who played Miyuki in the television series, does not appear in this special. It is explained that she has a boyfriend and has lost her virginity, thereby losing her psychic powers.

== Release ==
The special was broadcast in Japan on April 3, 2015.

== Home video ==
The special was released on DVD by TV Tokyo on August 19, 2015.
