= Minna! ESPer Dayo! (TV series) =

- Genre: Miniseries
- Based on: Minna! Esper Dayo! by Kiminori Wakasugi
- Screenplay by: Kiminori Wakasugi; Sion Sono; Shinichi Tanaka; Taichi Suzuki
- Directed by: Sion Sono; Yu Irie; Taichi Suzuki; Sho Tsukikawa
- Starring: Shōta Sometani; Kaho; Erina Mano
- Theme music composer: Yu Takahashi
- Country of origin: Japan
- Original language: Japanese
- No. of episodes: 12

Production
- Producers: Shinji Abe; Kōichi Hamatani; Yukitoshi Komatsu; Hiromi Masuyama; Takeshi Moriya; Shinji Okabe; Takeshi Suzuki
- Running time: 29 minutes per episode
- Production companies: TV Tokyo; Dentsu

Original release
- Release: April 12 – July 5, 2013

Minna! Esper Dayo! (みんな！ エスパーだよ！, Minna! Esper Dayo!) is a 2013 Japanese twelve-part science fiction comedy television miniseries adapted from the seinen manga series Minna! Esper Dayo! written and illustrated by Kiminori Wakasugi. It aired on TV Tokyo from April 12 to July 5, 2013. The show's theme song is Japanese-language song "(Where's) The Silent Majority?" by the Japanese singer-songwriter Yu Takahashi. It was followed by a 2015 TV special titled All Esper Dayo! SP.

== Plot ==
Yoshirō Kamogawa, a student at East Mikawa High School in Aichi Prefecture, discovers that he has psychic powers. Over the course of the series he discovers that he and his childhood friend Miyuki both have telepathic powers, Mr. Teru who operates the local Seahorse café has the power of telekinesis, senior Yōsuke Enomoto has the power of teleportation, student outcast Yabe has the power of clairvoyance, Hideo is a psychometer, Ms. Nastume and Mr. Hayashi have telekinesis, Pao can hypnotize people, and others in the town have powers as well. Yoshirō finds that many seek to use their newfound powers for perverted and trivial pursuits, but Yoshirō himself dreams of using his powers to protect his crush, the new transfer student Sae Asami who transferred in from Tokyo, and ultimately save the world. Meanwhile, a pair of ESP researchers who have been laughed out of Tokyo University visit the town to study the people with these powers and to stop them from being destroyed by evil psychics.

== Cast ==
- Shōta Sometani as Yoshirō Kamogawa
- Kaho as Miyuki Hirano
- Erina Mano as Sae Asami
- Makita Sports as Nagano Terumitsu a.k.a. Mr. Teru
- Motoki Fukami as Yōsuke Enomoto
- Tokio Emoto as Yasu
- Megumi Kagurazaka as Akiyama Takako
- Ken Yasuda as Prof. Asami
- Sairi Itō as Yūko
- Yui Murata as Rena
- Mariko Tsutsui as Kamokawa's mom
- Toshihiro Yashiba as Hayashi
- Yoshiki Saitō as Takeshi
- Masashi Tada as Kazuo
- Ijirī Okada as Kamokawa's dad
- Adam Torel as Sergei
- Yūsuke Yamanaka as Masaru
- Hirotaka Kurihara as Kōji
- Kōhei Takeda as Ezaki
- Akiyoshi Nakao as Kayama
- Yūya Ishikawa as Teacher
- Ayaka Morita as Meme Natsume
- Louis Kurihara as Mitsuru
- Kenichirō Mogi as Mogi
- Kyōko Aizome as Auntie
- Reiya Masaki as Yabe Naoya
- Suzunosuke as Hideo Ishizaki
- Ryōko Nagoshi as Hersel
- Aoba Kawai
- Mamiko Itō
- Yoshino Imamura as Hashi
- Atom Shimojō as Saijō
- Sanae Miyata as Hideo's mom
- Sion Sono
- Jyonmyon Pe as Maru
- Takuma Iwasaki as Tetsuya
- Sayaka Tashiro as Mariko
- Yūsuke Matsumoto as Young Hideo
- Shōko Tamimoto
- Yukiko Takenaka
- Erī Arai
- Waki Katakura
- Shōko Takasaki
- Saki Oppata
- Machi Ariake
- Haruyo Ushimaru
- Runa Kamiya
- Azusa Shiina
- Rina Sugihara
- Machi Ariake
- Mayu
- Asu Tatematsu

== Episodes ==
No.	Title	Directed by	Written by	Original release date
1	"Why do I Have Psychic Powers? Bus Stop Wind, Big Operation!" "Nande Boku ni Chō Nōruokudan? Basutei no Kaze, Dai Sakusen!" (なんで僕に超能力だん？ バス停の風、大作戦!)	Sion Sono	Sion Sono/Shinichi Tanaka	April 12, 2013
Yoshirō Kamogawa, a Japanese high school student, discovers that he has the power of telepathy and can read the mind of his teacher Mr. Hayashi, who lusts after Sae Asami, a female exchange student from Tokyo. Yoshirō resolves to use his powers to protect her and potentially save the world. Yoshirō's former childhood friend Miyuki discovers that she also has such powers. Yoshirō can sense that Mr. Terumitsu, who is nicknamed "Mr. Teru" and operates the local Seahorse café, lusts after Miyuki as well as Yoshirō's mother. Mr. Teru gives the young virgin Yoshirō a Tenga masturbation aid. Ayama attempts to rape Miyuki but she senses his intent and fights him off. Yoshirō suspects that fellow pupil and basketball star Ekazi has the power of telekinesis but it is actually Mr. Teru who has this power. A researcher and his assistant Ms. Akiyama have been laughed out of Tokyo University for their study of psychic abilities so they move to the small town to study the multiple residents developing these abilities.
2	"Listen to Your Heart! A Big Operation to Rescue her from the Love Hotel!" "Kokoro no Koe o Kike! Rabuho kara Kyūshutsu Seyo, Dai Sakusen!" (心の声を聞け！ ラブホから救出せよ、大作戦!)	Yu Irie	Sion Sono/Shinichi Tanaka	April 19, 2013
Yoshirō finds that the beautiful Asami's mind is filled with dirty thoughts and discovers that Miyuki is also telepathic like he is. Ayama calls Miyuki and offers to apologize for his actions in person but Yoshirō senses that he intends to forcibly rape Miyuki. Ayama lures Miyuki into a love hotel and Yoshirō follows them together with Mr. Teru dressed up in an anime cosplay outfit. Yoshirō uses his telepathy to warn Miyuki to escape but she decides to trust Ayama. Mr. Teru uses his telekinesis to prevent Miyuki from touching Ayama and when Ayama empties his sex toys from his bag she realizes his true intentions and fights him off. As the three are leaving the love hotel they are spotted by Asami, who assumes that they were having a threesome, much to Yoshirō's dismay.
3	"Diving Naked? A Big Operation to Retrieve the Cell Phone!" "Hadaka de Daibu? Geitai Denwa o Dakkan Seyo, Dai Sakusen!" (裸でダイブ？ 携帯電話を奪還せよ、大作戦!)	Yu Irie	Shinichi Tanaka	April 26, 2013
Jealous of Ezaki's dominance at basketball, Enomoto teleports out of his clothes to block a shot, ending up naked. He devises a plan to teleport to where Asami is changing after school but Yoshirō reads his thoughts and enlists the aid of Mr. Teru to use his telekinesis to steal the spare key to the changing room by explaining that he can use it to see Asami's panties because Mr. Teru can only use his telekinesis for erotic purposes. Enomoto teleports too late and is left alone naked in the women's changing room, where he steals Asami's school uniform and cellphone. Fearing that he will not be able to teleport with it, he forces the phone up his rectum by imagining a gay scenario with the Russian student Sergei. Yoshirō, Miyuki, and Mr. Teru find him in that state and Yoshirō tells Mr. Teru to pull the phone out with his telekinesis by describing a scenario in which there are nude photos on it. Enomoto manages to teleport away with the phone but is caught naked on the roof and convinced to join them, though he truly wants to use his powers with Mr. Teru's in order to get girls. Asami later notices a smell on her phone.
4	"The World is Made of Black and Pink, Big Operation!" "Sekai wa Kuro ka Pinku de Dekite iru, Dai Sakusen!" (世界は黒かピンクでできている、大作戦!)	Taichi Suzuki	Taichi Suzuki	May 3, 2013
Yoshirō attempts to work up the courage to speak to Asami but Miyuki advises him against it because she can hear Asami's true inner dark, angry, mean, and petty thoughts. He encounters Asami alone on the way to school one morning and, consumed with questions about the status of her virginity, has an awkward talk with her about writing his "virgin work". He asks Yabe, a clairvoyant student outcast at the school, to sense the color of Asami's nipples because Mr. Teru has convinced Yoshirō that virgins have pink nipples which turn dark after having sex. They follow her to the beach, where Yabe senses her up close and waves a pink flag to the others. In a scene with the researchers it is revealed that Yabe cannot control actually his clairvoyance and merely senses the pinkness of internal organs. Asami attempts to call her old boyfriend Tetsuya but the number no longer works.
5	"A Sudden Burst of Tears!? A Big Operation to Sense Mother's Feelings" "Masakano Dai Gōkyū!? Haha no Omoi o Kanjitore, Dai Sakusen!" (まさかの大号泣!? 母の想いを感じとれ、大作戦!)	Taichi Suzuki	Taichi Suzuki	May 10, 2013
Hideo is a psychometer who can read the memories or thoughts of people through objects that belong to them. Yoshirō suggests a party at a bowling alley where Miyuki reads Asami's mind that she is a virgin. Hideo hates women he perceives as "sluts" like his dead mother Akemi, who he believes slept with Saijo. Saijo gives Yoshirō Hideo's mother's baseball glove and Yoshirō forces Hideo to touch it to confirm that she did not sleep with Saijo but was merely practicing catching baseballs with him so that she could help her son Hideo. At the end it is revealed that the researcher from Tokyo is Sae's father.
6	"A ESPer War Breaks Out? A Big Operation to Save the Bound Girl!" "Esupā Kōsō Boppatsu? Shibarareta ano Musume o Sukue, Dai Sakusen!" (エスパー抗争勃発？ 縛られたあの娘を救え、大作戦!)	Sion Sono	Sion Sono/Shinichi Tanaka	May 24, 2013
The researchers, Tadaki Asami and Akiyama Takako, gather the psychics together in their office and explain that the psychic powers are only awakened in virgins with an extreme sexual complex who masturbated to orgasm while being struck by light reflected during a lunar eclipse that occurs during a once-in-a-century planetary alignment. Ms. Akiyama is clairvoyant but can only use her power while the subject is focused on her breasts. The psychics previously awakened in Duluth, Minnesota wiped each other out and Professor Asami fears that this will happen again when he finds a message board post from a destructive psychic. Yoshirō is excited to finally be able to save the world but the others abandon him. High school teachers Ms. Nastume, a telekinetic who can crush men's balls, and Mr. Hayashi, a telekinetic who can control the wind, oppose Professor Asami's team by kidnapping Sae Asami. Yoshirō and Miyuki can only read minds and find themselves initially outmatched but the other psychics arrive and assist them in defeating the rogue teachers and rescuing Sae. Sae does not believe in psychic powers and despises the newly formed team of psychics because her mother died while her father was consumed with his research into psychics and she has now been dragged to this tiny town.
7	"Forbidden Coffee!? A Big Operation to Stop the Mass Production of "Sexy Women"!" "Kindan no Kōhī!? "Sekusī Onna" Tairyō Seisan o Yamero, Dai Sakusen!" (禁断のコーヒー!? "セクシー女"大量生産を止めろ、大作戦!)	Sion Sono	Sion Sono	May 31, 2013
Sae Asami pretends to be interested in Yoshirō in order to gather information about her father's research. Mr. Teru's patrons are drawn away to a new café named Onkoen that is run by the hypnotist Pao and serves "Wanton Coffee", coffee spiked with an arousal-inducing substance. The girls are hypnotized into wearing skimpy Tenga Girls outfits and Professor Asami loses interest in studying psychics. Despite being aroused by the girls in their outfits, Yoshirō explains that love is more important and convinces Pao to release everyone from hypnosis.
8	"True Love? A Big Operation to Keep the Stolen light of Eroticism from Going Out!" "Shinjutsu no Ai? Ubawareta no Akari o Kesu na, Dai Sakusen!" (真実の愛？ 奪われたエロの灯を消すな、大作戦!)	Sho Tsukikawa	Shinichi Tanaka	June 7, 2013
Mr. Teru is seduced by Sally Ninomiya, a large woman with the power of "Love Control" who can control other people's romantic feelings and make them believe that she is beautiful. As he spends time with her he loses the sexual urges that are vital to his powers and gives away his Tenga products and porn DVDs. While Mr. Teru is proposing marriage to her, two drunken businessmen pass by and call her a troll. Mr. Teru fights them but is beaten up. Sally is impressed by his kindness takes him to her house to treat his wounds and cook curry rice for him, removing the carrots that he does not like. Miyuki reads Sally's mind at a grocery store and learns that she means to drain Mr. Teru's power and destroy him so Miyuki confronts her but is pushed down. The young psychics find Mr. Teru's Seahorse café closed so Hideo touches the spot where Sally pushed Miyuki and reads where Sally's apartment is, but when they arrive there Sally and Mr. Teru have already returned to the Seahorse. Enomoto teleports back there and uses his defensive basketball skills to keep Sally there while the others arrive in a taxi. Miyuki notices that the curry rice in Sally's bag was made with love for Mr. Teru because there are no carrots in it and convinces Sally that she has true feelings for Mr. Teru and will regret it if she hurts him. Sally agrees and releases Mr. Teru then leaves town. Mr. Teru does not remember what occurred and demands the return of his Tenga products and porn DVDs.
9	"A Million Confessions!? A Big Operation for a Wake-up Kiss!" "100 Man-kai no Kokuhaku!? Mezame no Kisu, Dai Sakusen!" (100万回の告白!? 目覚めのキス、大作戦!)	Sho Tsukikawa	Shinichi Tanaka	June 14, 2013
A fortune teller visits the Seahorse café and places Yoshirō in a "dream loop" in which he confesses his love to Sae Asami in various ways and is continuously rejected. The psychics confront the fortune teller, who tells them that the key to rescuing Yoshirō is his problem itself, namely Sae Asami. They bring her to him at the Seahorse café and try to force her to kiss him but Mr. Teru becomes impatient and kisses Yoshirō awake himself.
10	"A Crime of Love!? Morning Coffee with You! (Final Chapter: Prologue)" "(Sai Shūshō・Jo) Koi no Tsumi!? Mōningu Kōhī wa Anata to!" ((最終章・序）恋の罪!? モーニングコーヒーはあなたと!)	Sion Sono	Sion Sono	June 21, 2013
Enomoto tries to practice for a marathon but gets a cramp because he has been teleporting everywhere. He sees girls in sexy waitress outfits in a magazine and teleports to that restaurant. Mr. Teru also yearns to lose his virginity. Professor Asami and Ms. Akiyama take a break by going on a date to Non Hoi Park. Miyuki demands a date from Yoshirō so they also go to Non Hoi Park, where they both admit that they want to lose their virginity and Miyuki confesses that she likes Yoshirō. She reads Sae's angry feelings toward Ms. Akiyama and spite for Yoshirō and the two girls get into an argument, which Professor Asami and Ms. Akiyama overhear. At the Seahorse café Professor Asami begins quickly downing beers so Ms. Akiyama leaves for the office, where she finds that Sae has accepted that they will not be returning to Tokyo and has begun using the East Mikawa dialect. Hideo and Yabe are disgusted at Professor Asami's drunken state and leave, deciding not to follow him anymore. Sae learns that Tetsuya will be going on an American exchange program when he graduates.
11	"The Time has Come! The Final Battle Between Good and Evil... Team ESPer Disbands!? (Final Chapter: Break)" "(Sai Shūshō・Yabu) Yoi to Warui no Saishū Kessen... Chīmu Esupā Kaisan!?" (（最終章・破）時は来た！ 善と悪の最終決戦…チームエスパー解散!?)	Sion Sono	Sion Sono	June 28, 2013
Saigō Takamori, a psychic from Kagoshima, arrives and infiltrates Asami Sae's mind. Ms. Akiyama warns Professor Asami that his drinking will cause him to lose his daughter so he cleans himself for a TV interview. Yoshirō demonstrates his powers on the show, which airs in all of Japan seven days later. Yabe, Enomoto, and Mr. Teru are initially angry but end up being flattered by the media attention when other shows want to interview them. Hideo and Miyuki attempt to stay out of the spotlight. During a broadcast celebrating the opening of Professor Asami's new ESPer Development Center outside Toyohashi Station, Asami Sae marches in front of the cameras and announces that the USA pachinko parlor and model NASA space shuttle at Toyohashi Station are the reason why the final battle of Armageddon will occur in East Mikawa.
12	"I'm Going to Save the World! Big Operation Woof Woof Woof!? (Final Episode: Dreams of Youth)" "(Saishūkai・Seishun no Yume) Boku ga Sekai o Sukunda! Wanwanwan Dai Sakusen!?" (（最終回・青春の夢）僕が世界を救うんだ！ ワンワンワン大作戦!?)	Sion Sono	Sion Sono	July 5, 2013
Asami Sae pretends to suddenly be interested in her father's work and convinces him that aliens plan to take the Earth's power away in a UFO shaped like a NASA spaceship atop Toyohashi Station. Professor Asami announces this to the media, making him and all of the psychics a laughing stock in town. Pao the hypnotist and Saigō Takamori tell Mr. Teru that they do not dislike him and get hired to work at the Seahorse café, which they use as an opportunity to teach Yoshirō to unlock his true power by tapping his temple three times. They appear in the Asami home and tell Sae that she is an omnipotent ESPer. She admits to her father that she gained powers from masturbating that night, just as the others have. Due to the ridicule the Asami family returns to Tokyo and the other psychics ask Yoshirō what to do. He tells them that they should give up and split apart, which they do. Pao and Saigō Takamori also quit their jobs. A year later Yoshirō's powers have weakened, Yabe has made new friends, Hideo has gotten a job, and Enomoto has won the marathon. Miyuki has made friends with other boys and Yoshirō cannot read her mind anymore. Yoshirō no longer aspires to save the world. Pao the hypnotist, Saigō Takamori, and Mogi Kenichiro together with his dog Inu are revealed to be forms of the three wise men of the Bible who can foresee events. Mogi Kenichiro psychically tells Yoshirō that the aliens will be moving the next day. The next morning Yoshirō sees the spaceship from the top of Toyohashi Station flying away as his friend Yasu runs to him shouting that the town is in trouble. More UFOs and giant robots attack the city with lasers, setting it in flames. Yoshirō remembers what Pao and Saigō Takamori told him and taps his temple three times. He gains the power to shoot lasers from his eyes and uses this power to destroy a UFO. He then encounters Pao and Saigō Takamori, who send him back in time one year to change his actions. When asked by the psychics what they should do, this time Yoshirō tells them that they should stick together and train to fight for the final battle. The professor, his daughter Sae, and Ms. Akiyama remain in the town to help them.

== Production ==
The series is the first adaptation of the seinen manga series Minna! Esper Dayo! written and illustrated by Kiminori Wakasugi. It was followed by a 2015 TV special directed by Sion Sono with much of the same cast but without Kaho. A 2015 theatrical film adaptation of the source material, titled The Virgin Psychics, was also directed by Sion Sono but had some changes in casting.

== Broadcast ==
The series premiered on TV Tokyo on April 12, 2013, and ran weekly episodes (with the exception of May 17) until its twelfth and final episode aired on July 5, 2013.

== Home video ==
The TV series was made available for purchase on DVD and Blu-ray from TV Tokyo on August 23, 2013. The DVD box costs 15,200 yen and the Blu-ray box costs 19,000 yen. Extras include a documentary about Sion Sono and a special about the making of the series.
