= The Land of Hope (2012 film) =

2012 film by Sion Sono

Japanese name
- Kanji: 希望の国
- Literal meaning: Country of Hope
Transcriptions
- Revised Hepburn: Kibō no Kuni
- Directed by: Sion Sono
- Starring: Isao Natsuyagi; Naoko Otani; Jun Murakami; Megumi Kagurazaka; DenDen
- Release dates: September 7, 2012 (Toronto International Film Festival); October 20, 2012 (Japan)
- Running time: 133 minutes
- Countries: Japan; United Kingdom; Taiwan
- Language: Japanese

The Land of Hope (Japanese: 希望の国, Hepburn: Kibō no Kuni) is a 2012 Japanese film directed by Sion Sono. Following a nuclear accident, nearby residents are forced to evacuate. A pregnant evacuee fears that she is still at risk from radiation even in her new location, while her in-laws refuse to leave their home.

== Plot ==
An earthquake hits Japan causing a nuclear power plant to explode. In a small village in the fictitious Nagashima prefecture, a couple of farmers lead a most peaceful existence and cling to their property despite the instructions of the authorities who define a security perimeter cutting the locality in two. Son and daughter-in-law leave for another village, where Izumi, the young wife, discovers that she is going to give birth to a child. A film evoking the nuclear disaster in Fukushima on March 11, 2011.

== Cast ==
- Isao Natsuyagi as Yasuhiko Ono
- Naoko Otani as Chieko Ono
- Jun Murakami as Yoichi Ono
- Megumi Kagurazaka as Izumi Ono
- Denden as Ken Suzuki

== Accolades ==
List of awards and nominations
Year	Award	Category	Recipient(s)	Result	Ref.
2012	Chicago International Film Festival	Best International Feature (Gold Hugo)	Sion Sono	Nominated	
2012	Toronto International Film Festival	NETPAC Prize	Sion Sono	Won	
2012	Dubai International Film Festival	Muhr AsiaAfrica Awards	Sion Sono	Nominated	
2013	CPH PIX	Politiken Audience Award	Sion Sono	Nominated	
2013	Mainichi Film Concours	Best Actor	Isao Natsuyagi	Won	
