= Tokyo Vampire Hotel =

2017 Japanese TV series

- Genre: Horror fiction
- Screenplay by: Sion Sono
- Directed by: Sion Sono
- Starring: Ami Tomite; Kaho; Shinnosuke Mitsushima
- Theme music composer: Tricot
- Countries of origin: Japan; United States
- Original language: Japanese
- No. of episodes: 9

Production
- Producer: Bogdan Craciun
- Running time: 29-52 minutes per episode 142 minutes (film version)

Original release
- Network: Amazon Video
- Release: 16 June 2017

Tokyo Vampire Hotel (東京ヴァンパイアホテル) is a 2017 Japanese nine-part horror television miniseries written and directed by Sion Sono. All episodes (episode 8 was split into two parts for streaming) were originally released on Amazon Video on June 16, 2017. A special feature-length cut running 2 hours and 22 minutes was shown at film festivals, including the 2017 Chicago International Film Festival. The theme song "Tokyo Vampire Hotel" is performed by the Japanese math rock band Tricot.

== Premise ==
Manami is targeted by the rival vampire clans the Draculas and the Corvins on her 22nd birthday. That night, young men and women are invited to Hotel Requiem for a special coupling party held by Yamada, a Corvin vampire who lives in and operates the ornately beautiful, palatial hotel with his partner Elizabeth Báthory. Yamada declares to the gathered crowd that the world is ending and only the people inside the hotel will be saved. The Dracula vampire K, who possesses tremendous power, struggles against the other vampires to save Manami.

== Cast ==
- Ami Tomite as Manami
- Yumi Adachi as Empress
- Megumi Kagurazaka as Elizabeth Báthory
- Kaho as K
- Shinnosuke Mitsushima as Yamada
- Akihiro Kitamura as Gen
- Haruna Yokoyama as Dre
- Nana Mori as Akari

== Episodes ==
| No. | Title |
|---|---|
| 1 | "episode 1 (38:47)" |
Ages ago, The Corvin Clan (also known as the Neo Vampires) confined their opponents, The Dracula Clan, underground. According to a prophecy, a child born nine seconds past 9:09 on September 9th, 1999 would possess infinite power and would save the Dracula Clan. Three children were born at that specific instant, but the only surviving one is a girl named Manami, who is unaware of her power or of the existence of vampires. When Manami becomes 22 years old, the power inside her will "mature" and be unleashed. In the year 2021, hours before Manami's 22nd birthday, she is in a café with her friends. A vampire of the Dracula clan enters the café and kills every customer, in an attempt to take Manami with her, but she is soon herself killed by vampires of the Corvin clan, who are also looking for Manami. Manami flees from the café and she is eventually found by a vampire of the Dracula clan named K, who takes her with her. The two visit Manami's boyfriend, who turns out to also be a vampire, and is killed by K. Manami runs away from K and encounters Yamada, a psychotic vampire of the Corvin clan who takes her with him and explains to her who she is. K and other members of the Dracula clan find them, and the vampires engage in a fight for Manami. Eventually, Yamada wins and takes Manami with him. In what is eventually revealed to be a Television episode, a palm reader realizes that every person whose palm she reads has less than a day to live, and comes to the conclusion that the world will end that night. We see the prime minister of Japan talking about the introduction of a microchip system before a title card informs us that the world will end in 2 hours, the exact time of Manami's 22nd birthday.
| 2 | "episode 2 (43:47)" |
The episode is split into two parts. The first part takes place in 2006, and depicts the childhood of M, one of the other, deceased girls born on the exact same instant as Manami. It is suggested that her parents are not truly her parents, but are simply paid by vampires to act like they are. Whenever they fail at properly parenting M, they are killed and replaced. By the end of the first part, M is a teenager with completely different parents than the ones she originally had. She starts bleeding and is approached by a stranger, who happens to be Manami. She dies trying to find Manami again. The second part takes place in Transylvania in 2016. K, who is a normal human being, and her friend Noah, are exchange students in Romania. They encounter a Romanian girl who leads them through tunnels under the city to Corvin Castle, where a celebration is being held in honor of the day when Corvin slayed Dracula. As it turns out, the Romanian girl is a vampire, and she abducts K and Noah, taking them to Hotel Requiem, the lair of the Corvin clan, where they meet Yamada, his lover Elizabeth Báthory and her mother. The Corvin vampires feed on Noah, but are unenthusiastic about the taste of K's blood, and thus send her underground, as food for the Dracula clan. There, K becomes one of them. In present day, K awakens in the site where her fight with Yamada took place, and concludes that Yamada is taking Manami to Hotel Requiem.
| 3 | "episode 3 (51:02)" |
A large amount of ordinary, "lonely" men and women have received mysterious invitations for an event, dubbed a "Coupling Party", to take place in Hotel Requiem. When they arrive at the Hotel, they are given large sums of money, and are promised even more money if they form a couple with another guest. K and her Dracula clan companions infiltrate the Coupling Party in search of Manami. Yamada brings Manami to the hotel. Elizabeth's mother (who also raised Yamada), the owner of the Hotel, who is extremely old and disfigured, wants to drink Manami's blood when she turns 22, because it will restore her youth and make her live longer. The Corvin vampires cut Manami and feed Elizabeth's mother a small amount of her blood, which temporarily makes her young again. Noah, who has now become a Corvin vampire, feeds her own blood to Manami so her wounds can be healed. It is revealed that the Prime Minister is actually Yamada's real father, who sold him over to the Vampires, thus causing Yamada's hatred for him and for the world at large. Manami attempts to escape, and ends up in the room where the Coupling Party takes place. There, she is spotted by K, but is escorted away by Noah, who reveals to her that she intends on helping her escape. The guests of the Coupling Party are suddenly informed that the entirety of the world, with the sole exception of the Requiem Hotel, is going to end that night. They then learn that they will have to stay in the hotel for the next 100 years, where they will reproduce and continue the human race. The sole price they will have to pay for staying at the luxurious Hotel is a certain amount of blood, to be provided as food for the vampires monthly. Yamada shows them a video of Tokyo being destroyed by a nuclear explosion as well as other destroyed cities around the world, then begins killing guests who attempt to leave the Hotel.
| 4 | "episode 4 (38:10)" |
The guests are sent to separate rooms and instructed to create families for the vampires to feed on. It is revealed that Noah is betraying the Corvins and works with K to get Manami out of the Hotel. Manami, K and Noah successfully escape the Hotel, but K's companions stay behind and are killed by the Corvins. The temporary effect of Manami's blood on Elizabeth's mother is dissolving, and as a result she is withering. As it turns out, the Hotel is actually her sister, and she fears that if she does not drink Manami's blood, she will too turn into a hotel, so she sends Yamada and Elizabeth to fetch Manami. They discover Manami is missing, but are unfazed, since they want Elizabeth's mother to die so Yamada can inherit the Hotel. K, Noah and Manami arrive to the underground lair of the Dracula Clan in Romania, where they meet K's lover, the leader of the Dracula Clan, referred to only as 'Master'. Noah pledges to help the Dracula clan take revenge on the Corvins, and Master feeds her his blood, thus transforming her into a member of the Dracula clan. Manami learns that the Dracula vampires plan to drink her blood, which will give them the power to take revenge on the Corvins. Master then has sex with Manami and feeds on her as the others watch.
| 5 | "episode 5 (40:57)" |
The Dracula vampires all feed on Manami, and as a result she also becomes a vampire. Master sends K, Noah and Manami to "handle things" in Japan, while he and the other Dracula vampires stay behind to fight in Romania. He promises K to marry her once she returns. On the way back to Japan, Noah confesses her love to K, but she does not reciprocate her feelings. Noah insists she follow them to Japan, but K refuses, and knocks her unconscious, leaving with Manami. At the hotel, several party guests meet and decide to fight the vampires to escape, though other guests resist, convinced that the world outside has actually ended. Elizabeth's mother appears to die and thus, Yamada inherits the hotel and becomes "the King", causing the Corvins to celebrate. The guests attempting to escape fight the vampires but the vampires do not die. However, K finds the revolting guests and saves them by showing them how to kill a vampire. Yamada finds Noah and convinces her to switch back to his side. The guests make it to the entrance but are caught in a trap by Yamada and the Corvins. Elizabeth's mother's heart starts beating again.
| 6 | "episode 6 (43:54)" |
Elizabeth's mother comes back to life, but her body is microscopic, shriveled and doll-like. Elizabeth makes her mother her "pet", and thus, Yamada keeps his position as King of the Hotel. Yamada asks the guests if any of them do not believe the world has really ended; attempted escapee Gen does not, so Yamada lets him open the front door. Outside, Gen sees the world in flames, and nearly dies begging to come back, until Yamada forgives him and lets him in. After this incident, the guests are all convinced the world has really ended. Yamada orders them to gather in the hall. Elizabeth and other Corvins find K and Manami. They take them underground to the Empress, the sister of Elizabeth's mother, whose body is the hotel. Manami is cut and her blood is fed to the Empress, with Yamada and Elizabeth also feeding on her. While she is being fed on, Manami takes full vampire form and escapes. K is imprisoned inside the walls of the hotel, which are full of old guests who did not start families or rebelled against the vampires, and are now forced to recreate and continually cut themselves to feed the living hotel. The guests gather up in the hall, where Yamada informs them that the Coupling Party is happening again, only this time, they are given only 10 minutes to form a couple and those who don't will be killed by the vampires. Yamada unexpectedly announces the end of the deadline before 10 minutes have actually passed, and the guests who did not manage to form couples are eaten by the vampires. The members who did form couples are led to their rooms, with vampires overseeing them to make sure they have sex, often participating in the act themselves. K is given a sword to cut herself, but instead she escapes by cutting open the Empress. She then feeds on her to consume the power of the hotel. K then heads upstairs and begins killing the hotel staff in each room, leading the guests to revolt once again, only this time with the knowledge of how a vampire can be killed.
| 7 | "episode 7 (43:08)" |
The guests and the vampires are battling. Yamada enters the battle, and is unfazed by bullets, killing many guests, including Gen. The guests notice blood pouring from the walls and begin cutting and shooting the walls, harming the Empress. Manami and K also enter the battle. Yamada goes underground to find the Empress's body eviscerated. Yamada and K battle; during the battle, Yamada expresses his hate for humans and tells K of how his father sold him to the vampires; she wins but lets him live out of respect. Elizabeth is killed by a guest while searching for Yamada. Yamada finds her severed head and kisses it before committing suicide out of sadness by cutting his own head off. K reports her success to Master, who tells her that he is sending two envoys to transport Manami back to Transylvania, but he tells K to stay in Japan herself because he no longer needs her. Heartbroken, K picks up a gun to commit suicide but is attacked by guards and uses it against them instead. Furious, she proclaims her hatred for all vampires, once again joining the battle. Manami is in agony due to her transformation to a vampire, asking K to shoot her, but K can't bring herself to do it. Noah enters the hotel and calls for K. Noah stabs K and then asks K to kill her; K cuts off Noah's head. Master's envoys arrive; one of them is the Romanian girl who first led K and Noah into the vampires. K kills both of the envoys. Manami, having realized she would never have become a vampire were it not for K, tries to kill K, but can't bring herself to do it. The guests attack Manami, who is overcome by despair and does not resist. The battle continues.
| 8 | "episode 8.01 (29:48)" |
In the aftermath of the battle, the few survivors clean up the blood, realizing that they have little time left to live now that the Empress is dead. However, two vampires claim that the hotel will survive, as they order a vampire chef named Cody to prepare meal for the humans. Manami wakes up, but has amnesia . 15 years later, the hotel is a peaceful and friendly place, where the few surviving vampires and humans live in harmony, as the guests eat the food prepared by Cody and agreeably offer their blood to be drawn as food for the vampires once a week. Manami still does not remember her past and is fully integrated into the society that has formed. We are introduced to Akari, a teenager who is the first and only human to have been born in the hotel. Manami follows a vision of a butterfly which leads her into a mysterious room, which the staff prevents her from entering. A guest who is looking for paint enters Cody's storage room, where she finds a file which reveals that the world having ended was simply a lie told by the vampires to the humans, so that the humans will stay in the hotel and grant the vampires a constant supply of blood. Akari finds a petal from a flower. It is revealed that the world indeed hasn't ended, and Cody regularly makes trips to the outside world to purchase food and feed on humans; it was one of these trips that brought the flower petal into the hotel. We see an unconscious K lying in a bathtub, with her blood being extracted by syringes; the two vampires replaced the Empress with her, and that is how the Hotel continued existing.
| 9 | "episode 8.02 (29:58)" |
Cody the chef visits the city to purchase food and meets a girl who he kidnaps and eats. As Akari and Cody are talking, she notices he smells of blood, which is odd since he claims he does not need blood and abstains from drinking the guests' donations. The two vampires visit K and determine that it may be time to replace her with Manami, as they deem K can't last much longer as the hotel's energy supply. Akari confronts Cody with the petals of the flower and he asks her to get rid of it. In the outside world, Cody is followed by a couple. We then see how he works as a bartender at nights to get the money necessary to buy food for the hotel. The vampires and humans in the hotel are angered by the discovery that Cody has disappeared and the kitchen storage is almost empty. Manami once again goes to the room she is forbidden from entering, where K is being held. The couple that followed Cody in the street enters the hotel, to find all the humans and the vampires convening. They announce that they are police officers, and are looking for Cody, who is a suspect for the murder of several women.
| 10 | "episode 9 (30:02)" |
Manami enters the room to find K. K tells Manami that one year earlier, Akari found K's room and regularly visited her since, with the two developing a friendship. Akari had now escaped through a hole in the wall in K's room in order to see the outside world. K bites Manami and awakens her memories. The police officers are captured and interrogated by the inhabitants of the hotel; they insist that the world outside still exists. The woman who found Cody's laptop confirms the officers' claims. Akari finds Cody in the outside world, and Cody confesses to killing people for blood whenever he left the hotel. The vampires eat the officers, as Akari returns to the hotel. The two vampires that maintained the hotel are crushed to realize that Yamada was lying to them and that the world hadn't really ended. Nevertheless, they and the guests resolve to continue life in the hotel as before and kill anyone who tries to escape. They hold a ceremony in which they are about to feed ancient blood to Akari so that she may replace K, but K and Manami intervene, rescuing Akari. K uses a sword to cut the chains on the front door, which opens. The living hotel is killed by the sunlight and the vampire staff members disappear. K is heavily injured by the sunlight, and dies in Manami's arms. The ending shows Akari and Cody travelling the outside world in a van with a coffin containing K in the back. A post-credits scene shows Manami having returned to a normal human life, working in an office under the pseudonym "Yamada".

== Development ==
The series was developed as part of a push by Amazon Prime Video to release more Japanese titles. James Farrell, head of Asia Pacific content, Amazon Prime Video, said, "Our focus is to work with the content creators to be innovative and deliver a content experience only available on Amazon. Right from the first episode customers will see something they haven’t seen before that’s awesome and different. With his unique voice and baroque style, Sono puts his mark on any genre." Sono himself said, "I had wanted to make an original vampire movie for a long time. I approached it as if making a movie. I am proud to say we've produced something that has never been done before either as TV drama or feature film."

== Filming ==
In addition to filming in the elaborate hotel set constructed in Tokyo, Sono also convinced Amazon to let him film in Romania. The series features Bran Castle (commonly known as Dracula's Castle), the Salina Turda salt mine, and other spots in Transylvania, where Sono and his crew filmed for five days. "If we didn't film in Romania, the series wouldn't have any power," Sono told The Japan Times, "I had to do it. Just shooting in Tokyo would have been no good."

== Release ==
All episodes were originally released on Amazon Video on June 16, 2017, with episode 8 split into two parts for streaming. A special feature-length cut running 2 hours and 22 minutes was shown at various film festivals, including the 2017 Chicago International Film Festival.
