= Noriko's Dinner Table =

- Theatrical release poster
- Directed by: Sion Sono
- Written by: Sion Sono
- Produced by: Takeshi Suzuki
- Starring: Kazue Fukiishi; Ken Mitsuishi; Yuriko Yoshitaka; Tsugumi
- Cinematography: Souhei Tanigawa
- Edited by: Junichi Ito
- Music by: Tomoki Hasegawa
- Production company: Mother Ark Co. Ltd.
- Distributed by: Eleven Arts
- Release dates: July 4, 2005 (Karlovy Vary); September 23, 2006 (Japan)
- Running time: 159 minutes
- Country: Japan
- Language: Japanese

Noriko's Dinner Table (Japanese: 紀子の食卓, Hepburn: Noriko no Shokutaku) is a 2005 Japanese psychological horror film written and directed by Sion Sono. The film serves as a prequel to Sono's 2001 independent horror film Suicide Club.

Suicide Club concerns the mass suicide of fifty-four schoolgirls and how it leads the law to a shadowy cult. Noriko's Dinner Table takes place before, during, and after the previous installment's timeline as an attempt to resolve several questions left unanswered. Themes explored include the generation gap in modern families, the malleability of personal identity, social alienation, suicide, and the use of the Internet.

The film received special mention at the 40th Karlovy Vary International Film Festival, before being released theatrically in Japan on September 23, 2006.

== Plot ==
Shy 17-year-old Noriko Shimabara lives with her younger sister Yuka, her mother Taeko, and her father Tetsuzo in Toyokawa, Japan. Unsatisfied with her small-town life, she hopes to move to Tokyo, especially when she learns that her childhood friend Mikan is now working independently as an idol. Tetsuzo disapproves of her ambitions and instead hopes she will attend a local university after high school.

Noriko discovers Haikyo ("Ruins"), a website where other teenagers from Japan communicate. Feeling alienated and misunderstood by her parents, and encouraged by her new friends from the site, she runs away from home and travels to Tokyo. She meets Haikyo's leader, a 25-year-old woman named Kumiko who uses the screen name "Ueno Station 54," at locker 54 in Ueno Station. Kumiko introduces Noriko to her family and takes her to visit her grandparents, whom Noriko later learns are actually paid actors working for Kumiko's organization, I.C. Corp, which offers paid rental family services to clients. Abandoned as an infant, Kumiko has developed a nihilistic view of society, even coldly rejecting her birth mother's attempts to reconcile in Kumiko's adulthood, and founded I.C. Corp to allow lonely people to fulfill their fantasies of a happy family life.

One of the I.C. Corp actors, Broken Dam, is hired by a man who wants her to act as his unfaithful wife so he can murder her. Broken Dam happily agrees, seemingly completely unfearful of death. Kumiko attends the session, and, impressed by Broken Dam's willingness to die for her role, orders 54 I.C. Corp actors to commit suicide by jumping in front of a train at Shinjuku Station (Note: As depicted in Suicide Club (2001).). She makes Noriko witness the event, hoping Noriko will undertake an equally consequential task one day. Back in Toyokawa, Yuka, who is also a Haikyo user, speculates on whether her sister was involved in the mass suicide and how Tetsuzo would react if she were to disappear as well. Yuka runs away to Tokyo to join I.C. Corp, but deliberately leaves behind hints for Tetsuzo to find so he can ascertain what has happened to her.

Taeko's mental state rapidly deteriorates in the wake of her daughters' absences, and she eventually commits suicide. Tetsuzo quits his job as a reporter to investigate his daughters' disappearances and sadly realizes that he was never supportive or aware of his daughters' feelings. Taking cues from sensationalist media tabloids, he comes across Haikyo and concludes that his daughters are part of a cult called the "Suicide Club". Tetsuzo contacts a member of I.C. Corp, who refutes the existence of a "Suicide Club" and instead expounds on a concept of social roles that forms the basis of the organization.

Two years after Noriko and Yuka's departure, Tetsuzo convinces his friend Ikeda to pose as a client for I.C. Corp, renting Kumiko as his wife and Noriko and Yuka — who now go by the aliases Mitsuko and Yoko, respectively) — as his daughters. Tetsuzo finds a house in Tokyo resembling the Shimabara family's and chooses it as the meeting site, moving all of their furniture into it. He hides in a wardrobe to observe as the session commences. Noriko and Yuka are unsettled upon arriving at the house, but fall back into their roles when prompted by Kumiko. After Ikeda sends Kumiko on an errand, Tetsuzo reveals himself, though the girls insist he is a stranger.

Kumiko's bodyguards arrive and attack Tetsuzo, but he retaliates and fatally stabs them all. Kumiko returns shortly thereafter, initially continuing to act out her role as normal before imploring Tetsuzo to kill her and run away with Noriko and Yuka, whom she addresses by their real names for the first time despite Noriko's protests. A distraught Yuka breaks down crying before begging to extend the session.

Tetsuzo, Kumiko, Mitsuko and Yuka eat dinner together. Tetsuzo treats Kumiko as his wife, referring to her as Taeko. That night, Yuka leaves at dawn and walks toward the city center, deciding that she is done being Yoko, but is no longer Yuka either. Noriko awakens shortly thereafter and, speaking to herself, bids goodbye to Yuka, her youth, Haikyo, and Mitsuko, before finally declaring that she is Noriko.

== Cast ==
- Kazue Fukiishi as Noriko Shimabara/Mitsuko
- Ken Mitsuishi as Tetsuzo Shimabara
- Yuriko Yoshitaka as Yuka Shimabara/Yōko
- Tsugumi as Kumiko/Ueno54
- Sanae Miyata as Taeko Shimabara
- Shirō Namiki as Ikeda
- Yōko Mitsuya as Mikan/Tangerine
- Tamae Andō as Broken Dam
- Chihiro Abe as Long Neck
- Hanako Onuki as Midnight
- Naoko Watanabe as Cripple
- Hiroshi Sakuma

== Novel ==
Suicide Circle: The Complete Edition was written by Sion Sono in April 2002. This book was a draft of sorts for Noriko's Dinner Table, according to Sono. The story of The Complete Edition deals with both the events of this film and those of Suicide Club. So far, no plans for an English edition have appeared.
