= Suicide Circle: The Complete Edition =

2002 novel by Sion Sono

- Author: Sion Sono
- Original title: Jisatsu Saakuru: Kanzenban
- Language: Japanese
- Genre: Thriller, Drama
- Publisher: Kawade Shobō Shinsha
- Publication date: 3 April 2002
- Publication place: Japan
- Media type: Print (Hardback)
- Pages: 156 pp (Japanese Edition)
- ISBN: 4-309-01462-3
- OCLC: 166679814

Suicide Circle: The Complete Edition (自殺サークル 完全版, Jisatsu Saakuru: Kanzenban) is a novel written by Japanese poet and filmmaker Sion Sono, based on his film Suicide Club and its prequel Noriko's Dinner Table (the two were supposed to form a trilogy with another film). It was published by Kawade Shobō Shinsha in 2002.

== Plot ==
Suicide Circle: The Complete Edition tells in four different chapters the story behind a fictional mass suicide that takes place on the Shinjuku Station in 2002, on which 54 high school girls throw themselves in front of a train. This event unleashes in Japan—and soon after, in the world—a chain of suicides that seems endless. Police officers try to stop it and understand why this is happening, and after several events they find a connection between the suicides and a website that belongs to a mysterious organization called Family Circle.

Through this website, Family Circle enrolls young people and incite them to run away from home to serve the Circle "family rentals", a service that the organization provides to families who lost relatives to suicide. Parallel to this, alongside the police's quest, the book also follows the story of one of Family Circle's new members who witnessed the mass suicide, Noriko Shimabara, and how her own family slowly falls apart to the suicide wave, while her father tries to "rescue" her from the Circle. In the end, all the pieces come together as the true meaning behind the website is revealed.

== Analysis ==
The book deals mostly with the theme of suicide, and the high teenage and Internet suicide rates in Japan, but also connects suicide with family and the generation gap between parents and children in modern society. It is also concerned with the nature of happiness, the perception of reality, and uses the figure of the circle to represent various philosophies.

Kanzenban was written by Sion Sono in order to give insight in the philosophy of suicide for his planned Suicide Club trilogy, and to intertwine the stories of these films.
