= All Esper Dayo! =

Japanese manga series

- Cover of the first manga volume

みんな！ エスパーだよ！ (Minna! Esper Dayo!)
- Genre: Comedy, science fiction
- Manga
- Written by: Kiminori Wakasugi
- Published by: Kodansha
- Magazine: Young Magazine
- Original run: 2009 – 2016
- Volumes: 8

All Esper Dayo! (みんな！ エスパーだよ！, Minna! Esper Dayo!) was a Japanese science fiction comedy seinen manga series written and illustrated by Kiminori Wakasugi. The manga ended at 8 volumes in 2016. It was adapted into a 2013 live-action television series, a live-action television special that was released April 3, 2015, and a live-action theatrical film that was released in Japan on September 4, 2015.

== Cast ==
Kamogawa Yoshirou (鴨川 嘉郎)
Played by: Sometani Shōta (染谷 将太)
The main protagonist of the series. A second-year high school student, he is quiet and barely noticed by anyone and spends much of his time thinking about girls. He is infatuated with Asami Sae. He has the power of telepathy and wishes to save the world as a hero with his psychic powers. He is able to control his power by tuning into a person's thought frequency.
In the manga, during the final battle, he is also capable of using his power to induce thoughts in others.
Hirano Miyuki (平野 美由紀)
Played by: Kaho (夏帆) - TV Series (2013)
Played by: Ikeda Elaiza (池田 エライザ) - Film (2015)
The main heroine and a childhood friend of Yoshirou in the series. A first-year high school student and Yoshirou's junior. She is very quick-tempered and has strong arms and legs. She gradually develops feelings for Yoshirou. Similar to Yoshirou, she is a psychic with the power of telepathy. Unlike Yoshirou, she is unable to fully control her power and it does not work all the time. Her telepathy range is short, but she is able to hear all thoughts within a certain distance.
In the manga, she develops the ability to see the inner-hearts and desires of a person.
Asami Sae (浅見 紗英)
Played by: Mano Erina (真野 恵里菜)
A transfer student from Tokyo. She is in the same class as Yoshirou. She has an ex-boyfriend named Tetsuya from Tokyo. Due to her Father's research, she was forced to come to the countryside and is stressed about it. On the outside, she is pure and lovely but has a black heart filled with hatred. She does not believe in psychic powers.
In the Manga, although initially not being to able to accept the fact that psychic powers exist, she later starts to slowly believe in it with the help of Yoshirou. She then makes up her mind to help the psychics in their fight but ends up losing her life. During the final battle, in the world of re-doing, she gains the ability to grant a malicious wish from the past. She also gains the ability of manipulation and shapeshifting. In that same world, she is dating Enzaki.

- Makita Sports as Terumitsu Nagano
- Motoki Fukami as Yōsuke Enomoto
- Reiya Masaki as Naoya Yabe
- Ken Yasuda as Takahiro Asami
- Megumi Kagurazaka as Takako Akiyama

== Adaptations ==
- Minna! ESPer Dayo! (2013 TV series)
- All Esper Dayo! SP (2015 TV special)
- The Virgin Psychics (2015 theatrical film)
