= Fujiko (actress) =

Japanese actress and model

Fujiko (不二子), real name Reiko Matsuo (松尾 玲子) or Reo Matsuo (松尾 玲央), born 5 March 1980, is Japanese actress and model.

== Selected filmography ==
- MPD Psycho (2000 TV)
- Visitor Q (2001)
- Strange Circus (2005)
- Manji (2006 remake)
- Tokyo Daigaku Monogatari (2006)
- Akai Tama (2015)
- Antiporno (2016)
