= Bad Film =

1995/2012 film by Sion Sono

BAD FILM
- Poster
- Directed by: Sion Sono
- Release date: 2012
- Running time: 160 minutes
- Country: Japan
- Language: Japanese

BAD FILM is a Japanese film directed by Sion Sono. The film, released in 2012, consists of 160 minutes of footage extracted from the original 150 hours shot in 1995 by the director.

== Plot ==
The film revolves around the rivalry between two gangs, one Chinese and one Japanese, in Tokyo.

== Background and production ==
The cast is mainly composed of members of Sono's art collective GAGAGA. The film was shot in HI-8, mainly in Kōenji district.

== Reception ==
The film received generally positive reviews. A review states: "An interesting case of a belated “director’s cut” Bad Film is necessarily an imperfect beast, but perhaps all the more interesting for it." The message the film may convey, however, has been considered unclear: "This movie has some things to tell us about prejudice and xenophobia, but it's hard to say exactly what those things are. Instead, consider it a treat to just let the waves of meaningful nonsense crash over you and go along for the ride."
