= Red Post on Escher Street =

2020 film by Sion Sono

- Release poster

Japanese name
- Kanji: エッシャー通りの赤いポスト
- Literal meaning: Red Post-box on Escher Street
Transcriptions
- Revised Hepburn: Esshā-dōri no akai posuto
- Directed by: Sion Sono
- Written by: Sion Sono
- Produced by: Masaya Takahashi; Hiroyuki Ogasawara
- Starring: Sen Fujimaru; Riku Kurokouchi; Mala Morgan; Tatsuhiro Yamaoka; Canon Nawata; Matsuri Kohira; Tomoko Fujita
- Cinematography: Masaya Suzuki
- Edited by: Sion Sono
- Production companies: Hikoki Films International; AMG Entertainment
- Release date: 9 October 2020 (VICF)
- Running time: 148 minutes
- Country: Japan
- Language: Japanese

Red Post on Escher Street (Japanese: エッシャー通りの赤いポスト, romanized: Esshā-dōri no akai posuto, lit. 'Red Post-box on Escher Street') is a 2020 comedy-drama film written, edited, and directed by Sion Sono, starring a large ensemble cast. It has been described as a "love-letter to cinema itself, its makers and, more than anything else, its performers."

== Premise ==
Festival-magnet director Tadashi Kobayashi (Tatsuhiro Yamaoka) holds an open audition for his upcoming film. A wave of aspiring actors apply, vying for any chance at screen time or to work with this talented filmmaker. The film follows the applicants in their own personal struggles. Unbeknownst to these aspiring actors are Kobayashi's own personal struggles and the issues arising behind the scenes during the film's pre-production.

== Cast ==
- Tomoko Fujita
- Sen Fujimaru as Yabuki Yasuko
- Mitsuru Fukikoshi
- Sayaka Hori
- Matsuri Kohira as Kiriko
- Marina Kozawa
- Riku Kurokouchi
- Mala Morgan as Katako
- Canon Nawata as Hirona Matsumoto
- Taro Suwa
- Jun Toba
- Tetsu Watanabe
- Tatsuhiro Yamaoka as Tadashi Kobayashi

== Production ==
In the year before the film's release, Sono participated as an instructor in a workshop for aspiring actors. He explained, "simply training [the students] wasn't enough, so I decided to make a film with them." He further described the film as being "like a graduation project" and that his intentions for the film weren't to make a film for theatres, but to make something to support his students and their future careers. Sono then went on to write the film, stating that some of the scenes in the film were inspired by his own experiences as a director, namely the scenes including the selfish producers, while other scenes were inspired by the experiences of his students in their endeavours to become professional actors.

When describing what it was like to work with his students, as opposed to professional actors, Sono said, "When I've worked with newcomers in the past, they would be paid for their participation. Workshop participants pay to be in the film. That's the big difference. In other words, I ended up putting more effort into training them."

Filming took only eight days to complete.

The final scene of the film was unscripted and shot after principal photography had finished. Sono said he wanted the final scene to be "documentary-like" and shot the scene on-location without extras. While the police officers who appeared in the scene were hired actors, Sono expressed that he wouldn't have minded if real police officers had shown up to stop their filming.

== Release ==
Red Post on Escher Street has had a limited release, first premiering on 9 October 2020 at the Valdivia International Film Festival. The film was also presented at the 35th Mar del Plata International Film Festival and the 49th Festival du nouveau cinéma. All three festivals were made available to stream virtually due to the COVID-19 pandemic.

For its US premiere, the film was made available to rent virtually for a limited time from Japan Society as part of their "21st Century Japan: Films from 2001 – 2020" series from 5 - 18 February 2021.

== Reception ==
David Ehrlich of IndieWire gave the film a B+ grade, calling it "an exhilarating postmodern comedy... An orgiastic celebration... It's a mega-satisfying and weirdly sweet payoff..." Jaime Grijalba of The Brooklyn Rail called the film a "love-letter to cinema itself, its makers and, more than anything else, its performers." Patrick Ball of Now Then magazine called Red Post on Escher Street "one of the best films of 2020. An open, moving, egalitarian masterpiece."
