= Sion Sono =

Japanese filmmaker, author, and poet (born 1961)

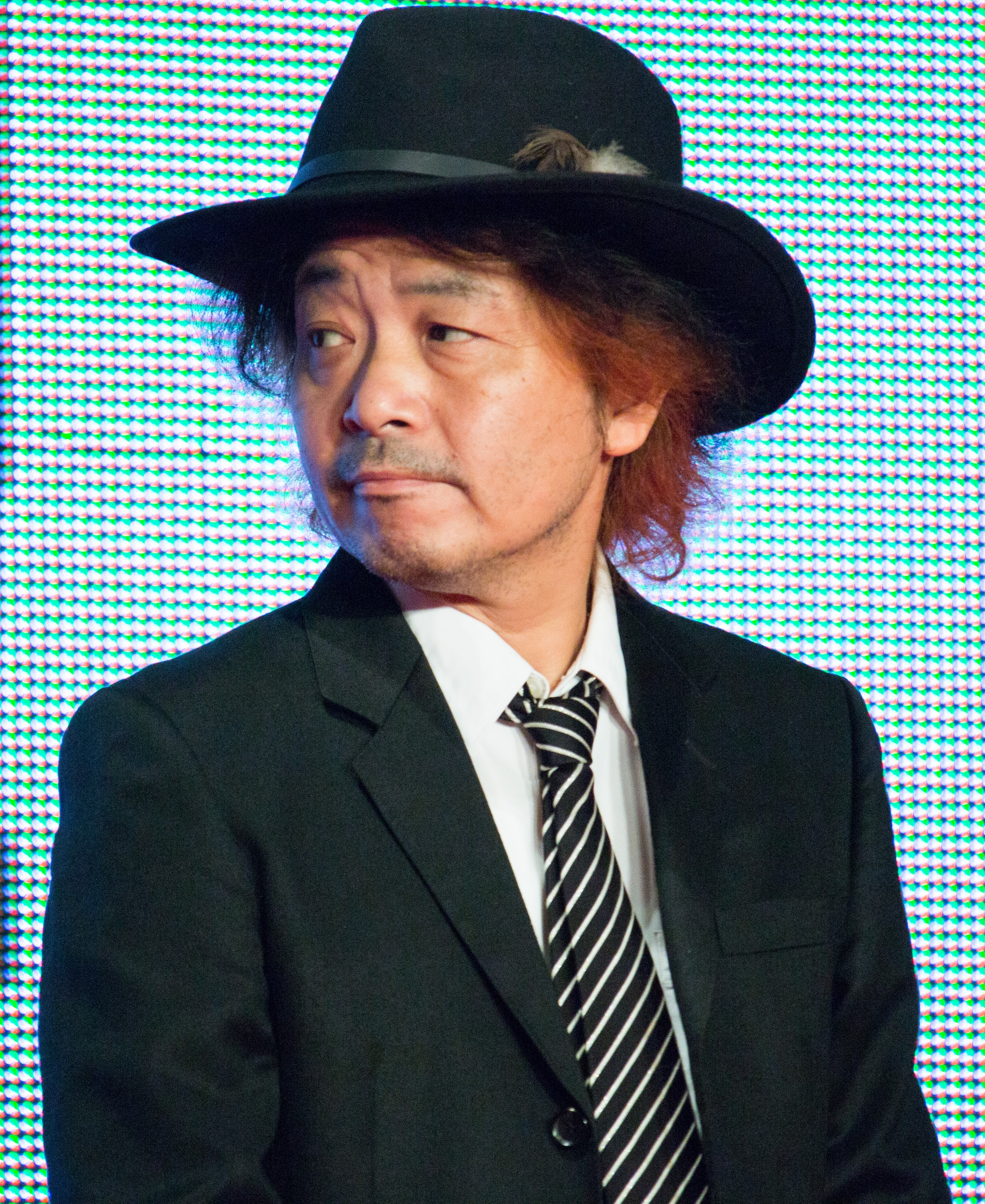
- Sono in 2015
- Born: December 18, 1961 (age 64); Toyokawa, Aichi, Japan
- Other name: Takayuki Yamamoto
- Occupations: Poet; film director; screenwriter; cinematographer; film composer; actor; film producer
- Spouse: Megumi Kagurazaka (m. 2011)

Sion Sono (園 子温, Sono Shion; born December 18, 1961) is a Japanese filmmaker, writer, and poet. He is best known for the films Love Exposure (2008), Strange Circus (2005) and Suicide Club (2001). He has been called "the most subversive filmmaker working in Japanese cinema today," and a "stakhanovite filmmaker" with an "idiosyncratic" career.

== Early life ==
Sion Sono was born in Aichi Prefecture in 1961. He has described his parents as being excessively strict, leading to him running away from home at 17.

=== Homelessness ===
After Sono ran away from home, he wandered the streets, often on the verge of starvation. On his first night in Tokyo, he met a woman who lured Sono into a hotel room where she put a knife to her own throat and threatened to commit suicide if he would not help her meet her parents pretending to be her husband. Sono not only agreed but spent several weeks with her family in the countryside, but in the end the woman let him go and gave him a small amount of money.

=== Entering the Unification Church ===
Soon, he began starving again. Then he met a priest from the Unification Church and agreed to join their cult because the priest promised Sono food and shelter. Sono spent some time in the cult but found it extremely funny how the main priest claimed to be God. Soon, Sono fled. Even though the cult was not yet as powerful as it is nowadays, it strictly prohibited its members to return into normal life and was not easy to get away from. The cultists tracked and followed the runaway.

=== Leaving the Unification Church ===
When Sono returned home, he found a letter from the cult on his table. To save himself from the cult, Sono decided to join one of the Communist terrorist groups which were protesting the expansion of the Narita International Airport during the Sanrizuka Struggle. Almost everyday their protests grew into fights with the riot police so they were happy to take in one more young and strong soldier. Eventually, Sono left the group, and the cult members never showed up again.

=== Return home and early poetry ===
Upon returning home, Sono entered Hosei University. During his student years he tried himself as a poet and even was published in magazines Eureka and The Modern Poem Book. Then he also started taking his first steps in film directing, making a series of short films on Super 8.

== Career ==
=== 1980s – 2000s ===
In 1985, Sono's short film Ore wa Sono Sion da!!, in which he introduced himself as a punk poet, was selected for the Pia Film Festival. Two years later, in 1987 Sono won the PFF Gran Prix with his film Otoko no Hanamichi (A Man's flower road). The PFF scholarship he spent to create the next movie, his first feature-length 16 mm film Bicycle Sighs (Jitensha Toiki), a coming-of-age tale about two underachievers in perfectionist Japan. Sono co-wrote, directed, and starred in the film.

In 1990, Sono moved to San Francisco, and was admitted to University of California, Berkeley; however, he never attended class, or learned English, instead spending his time watching B-movies and porno movies. Soon he dropped his studies and moved to San Francisco, in his own words, "to study movies". As he explained in interviews, he wanted to "clear his head from classic cinema". Upon return to Japan, he ventured into the creation of unconventional, "dark entertainment" art-house.

In Japan, he wrote and directed his second feature film, The Room (Heya) (1992), a bizarre tale about a serial killer looking for a room in a bleak, doomed Tokyo district. It participated in the Sundance Film Festival. The Room also toured on 49 festivals worldwide, including the Berlin Film Festival and the Rotterdam Film Festival.

In 1993–1995, Sono's main project was an art-group named Tokyo GAGAGA. Armed only with their creative ideas and art, group members 'led a guerilla war against normalization of solitude and loneliness in everyday life'. They seized the busiest streets of Tokyo and filled them with installations and banners.

In the following years, Sono directed works such as the drama I Am Keiko (1997), the faux-documentary Utsushimi (2000), and the pink film Teachers of Sexual Play: Modelling Vessels with the Female Body (2000). Also in 2000, Sono released an experimental short film 0cm4, contemplating on colourblindness and epistemology.

In 2001, Sono wrote and directed the horror film Suicide Club, his breakthrough feature, which follows a series of interconnected mass suicides. The film was very successful, gaining considerable notoriety in film festivals (including winning the Prize for "Most Ground-Breaking Film" at the 2003 Fantasia Film Festival), and developing a significant cult following over the years, even spawning a manga adaptation, as well as a companion piece novel written by Sono himself. In 2005, Sono released Noriko's Dinner Table, a prequel to Suicide Club, which also received acclaim. The film received special mention at the 40th Karlovy Vary International Film Festival.

In 2005, Sono also released three other films: Into a Dream (Yume no Naka e), a coming-of-age tale about the life of a theatre group member, Hazard, a crime film shot in New York City, (which was wide released in 2006) and Strange Circus, where Sono worked not only as director and writer, but also as composer and cinematographer. In 2006, he wrote and directed the drama film Balloon Club, Afterwards. In 2007, he wrote and directed the horror film Exte: Hair Extensions.

In 2008, Sono directed and wrote the 237 minutes-long epic Love Exposure, which is widely considered his most acclaimed and popular work to date. The film won the Caligari Film Award and the FIPRESCI Prize at Berlin International Film Festival, as well as the Best Asian Film award at the Fantasia Film Festival. Almost a decade later, Sono would release an extended mini-series version of the film titled, Love Exposure: The TV-Show. Love Exposure was the first film in Sono's thematic "Hate" trilogy. In 2009, Sono directed the dramas Be Sure to Share and Make The Last Wish.

=== 2010s and further ===
Love Exposure was followed by the second and third installments, Cold Fish, released in 2010, and Guilty of Romance, released in 2011; both were acclaimed, and gained him the Best Director awards at the Yokohama Film Festival and the Hochi Film Awards. 2011 saw Sono be recognized in the United States with his work being highlighted in the cinema series Sion Sono: The New Poet presented at the Museum of Arts and Design in New York City.

In 2011 and 2012 respectively, Sono released two drama films inspired by the 2011 Fukushima nuclear disaster and Tohoku Earthquake: Himizu and The Land of Hope. The films were praised for their simplicity and seriousness compared to Sono's other works, and Himizu won the Marcello Mastroianni Award at the 68th Venice International Film Festival. In 2012, Sono edited and released the film BAD FILM using footage from the production of a massive unreleased underground film he shot in 1995 starring the performance collective Tokyo GAGAGA.

In 2013, he directed the action-drama Why Don't You Play in Hell?, which was an international success, winning the People's Choice Award in the Midnight Madness section at the 2013 Toronto International Film Festival, and being distributed by the American company Drafthouse Films. In 2014, he directed Tokyo Tribe, a hip-hop musical adaptation of the manga of the same name.

In 2015, five films directed by Sono were released: Shinjuku Swan, an action yakuza film, Love & Peace, a tokusatsu fantasy drama, Tag, an action horror film which was named Best Film of the year at the Fantasia Film Festival, and the Fancine Malaga, The Virgin Psychics, an adaptation of the science fiction comedy manga series All Esper Dayo! by Kiminori Wakasugi, and The Whispering Star, a science fiction film which won the NETPAC Award at the 2015 Toronto International Film Festival.

In 2016, Sono was one of the directors chosen by Nikkatsu for its Roman Porno Reboot project, which asked five Japanese filmmakers to make a film that abided by the same rules as the studio's popular softcore pornography films released in the 1970s. Sono's film, the surrealist Antiporno, was praised for its exploration of female sexuality and contemplations on such topics as freedom and addiction, patriarchy, sexual objectification.

In 2017, Sono directed a sequel to Shinjuku Swan, Shinjuku Swan II. In the same year, he wrote and directed a 9-part horror mini-series titled Tokyo Vampire Hotel, which was produced and released to streaming by Amazon. A special feature-length cut of the show running 2 hours and 22 minutes was shown at various festivals. Also he made a cameo appearance in Meisekimu Genshi's short film Ami. exe.

In 2018, it was announced that Sono was working on his first overseas production and English-language debut, a film titled Prisoners of the Ghostland, starring Nicolas Cage, which was described by Cage as "the wildest movie I've ever made." In 2019, Sono was hospitalized and underwent emergency surgery following a heart attack, temporarily halting pre-production on the film.

In 2019, Netflix released The Forest of Love, a crime film written, directed and co-edited by Sono, inspired by the murders of Japanese serial killer Futoshi Matsunaga. An extended, mini-series version of the film, titled The Forest of Love: Deep Cut was also released. In 2020, Sono wrote, directed and edited the film Red Post on Escher Street, which followed a film director's efforts to complete a film, and won the People's Choice Award at the Montreal Festival of New Cinema.

Sono co-wrote the 2022 film Moshikashite, Hyūhyū, credited under the pseudonym "Takayuki Yamamoto" to obscure his involvement.

=== Television ===
Sono has director and writer credits for two episodes and acted in one episode of the 2006 comedy television mini-series Jikō Keisatsu (Prescription Police) and wrote one episode of the 2007 series Kaette Kita Jikō keisatsu (Before Prescription Police). He directed, wrote, and acted in an episode of the 2013 series Minna! ESPer Dayo! and directed its 2015 television special continuation All Esper Dayo! SP. Sono directed and wrote the 2017 Amazon original mini-series Tokyo Vampire Hotel.

== Reception ==
In The Hollywood Reporter, Clarence Tsui writes that Sono has "established himself as one of the most idiosyncratic artists of his generation". Often considered a provocateur, Mike Hale of The New York Times argues that he is "the most recognizable, if not the most universally celebrated, director in Japan", which Sono himself explains by stating (in Hale's words) that Japanese critics generally "reserve their approval for work that doesn't 'embarrass' the nation." The director has said, "I do think an international audience understands my work more." Sono is considered an auteur, with his style being characterized by features such as grotesque violence, extreme eroticism, philosophical references, surreal imagery, and complex narratives. Sono's portrayal of women has been a subject of discussion, with some considering his works misogynist, and others claiming they are feminist. Common themes in his works include sex, cinema, cynicism, and modern Japanese society. Sono's work has often been described as belonging to, or being inspired by, the ero guro nansensu genre.

== Sexual misconduct allegations ==
On April 4, 2022, women's magazine Shūkan Josei reported allegations by two actresses and rumors inside the Japanese film industry that Sono had allegedly sexually harassed and made unwanted advances towards actresses for years.

Sono released a statement on his website apologizing to everyone he may have disturbed and admitting his "lack of consideration and respect for others" as a filmmaker, but denied many of the allegations and said he would defend himself in court.

On May 18, 2022, Sono sued the publisher of Shūkan Josei for damages. On February 1, 2024, Sono Sion and Shūkan Josei reached a settlement whereby Shūkan Josei agreed to delete two articles from April 2022 that originally made the allegations.

== Awards ==
Sono received the following awards for his films:

- 2003: Fantasia International Film Festival – Most Ground-Breaking Film and Fantasia Ground-Breaker Award (Suicide Club)
- 2005: Karlovy Vary International Film Festival – Don Quijote Award and Special Mention (Noriko's Dinner Table)
- 2006: Berlin International Film Festival – Reader Jury of the "Berliner Zeitung" (Strange Circus)
- 2007: Austin Fantastic Fest – Best Film (Exte)
- 2009: Berlin International Film Festival – FIPRESCI Prize and Caligari Film Award (Love Exposure)
- 2009: Fant-Asia Film Festival – Best Asian Film, Most Innovative Film and Special Jury Prize (Love Exposure)
- 2010: Mainichi Film Concours – Best Director (Love Exposure)
- 2015: Fantasia International Film Festival – Cheval Noir Award for Best Film (Tag)
- 2015: Fantasia International Film Festival – Special Mention for its creative, surprising and monumental opening kill sequence (Tag)
- 2015: Fantasia International Film Festival – Audience Award for Best Asian Feature (Love and Peace)
- 2015: Toronto International Film Festival – NETPAC Award for World or International Asian Film Premiere (The Whispering Star)

Sono also received the following nominations for his films:

- 2005: Karlovy Vary International Film Festival – Crystal Globe (Noriko's Dinner Table)
- 2009: Asia Pacific Screen Awards – Achievement in Directing (Love Exposure)
- 2010: Asian Film Awards – Best Director (Love Exposure)

== Filmography ==
=== Feature films ===
Sion Sono's filmography includes:

Year	Title	Distributor	Credited as			Notes	Ref.
Year	Title	Distributor	Director	Screenwriter	Actor	Notes	Ref.
1986	A Man's Flower Road		Yes	Yes	Yes		
1986	Happiness Avenue		No	No	Yes		
1988	Decisive Match! Boys Dorm vs Girls Dorm		Yes	Yes	Yes		
1990	Bicycle Sighs		Yes	Yes	Yes	Co-written with Hisashi Saito.	
1991	I Hate You... Not		No	No	Yes		
1992	Heya (The Room)		Yes	Yes	No		
1994	Otaku		No	No	Yes		
1997	Keiko Desukedo (I Am Keiko)		Yes	Yes	No		
1998	Dankon: The Man		Yes	Yes	No		
1999	Kōshoku Fūfu: Susutte Hoshii		No	No	Yes		
2000	Blind Beast vs. Killer Dwarf	Teruo Ishii Productions, Slow Learner (Japan), Eleven Arts (USA)	No	No	Yes		
2000	Seigi no tatsujin: Nyotai tsubo saguri (Teachers of Sexual Play: Modelling Urns with the Female Body)		Yes	Yes	Yes		
2000	Utsushimi (The Real Body)		Yes	Yes	Yes	Credited as cinematographer.	
2001	Suicide Club	Earthrise (Japan), TLA Releasing	Yes	Yes	No		
2004	Nō-pantsu gāruzu: Movie box-ing2 : Otona ni Nattara (No Pants Girls: Movie Box-ing2)		Yes	Yes	No	Anthology series.	
2005	Into a Dream		Yes	Yes	No		
2005	Noriko's Dinner Table	Eleven Arts (global), Tidepoint Pictures	Yes	Yes	No		
2005	Hazard	Evokative Films, Eleven Arts	Yes	Yes	Yes	With Kazuyoshi Kumakiri as contributing writer. Also cameo.	
2005	Strange Circus		Yes	Yes	No	Credited as composer, cinematographer.	
2006	Balloon Club Revisited		Yes	Yes	No		
2006	Damejin		No	No	Yes		
2007	Exte	Toei Company	Yes	Yes	No	Screenplay written with Masaki Adachi, Makoto Sanada.	
2007	The Insects Unlisted in the Encyclopedia		No	No	Yes	Credited as composer.	
2008	Love Exposure	Omega Project	Yes	Yes	No		
2008	Tokyo Gore Police		No	No	Yes		
2009	Be Sure to Share		Yes	Yes	No		
2009	Make the Last Wish		Yes	Yes	Yes	Cameo.	
2010	Cold Fish		Yes	Yes	No	Co-written with Yoshiki Takahashi.	
2011	Himizu	Gaga	Yes	Yes	No		
2011	Guilty of Romance		Yes	Yes	No	Story written by Mizue Kunizane.	
2012	The Land of Hope		Yes	Yes	No		
2012	Bad Film		Yes	Yes	Yes	Credited as Film editor. Shot in 1995, released in 2012.	
2013	Why Don't You Play in Hell?	Drafthouse Films (USA)	Yes	Yes	No	Credited as composer.	
2014	Tokyo Tribe	Nikkatsu	Yes	Yes	Yes	Cameo.	
2015	Shinjuku Swan	Sony Pictures Entertainment	Yes	No	No		
2015	Love & Peace	Asmik Ace Entertainment	Yes	Yes	No		
2015	Tag	Shochiku, Asmik Ace Entertainment, Universal Pictures Japan (via NBCUniversal Entertainment Japan)	Yes	Yes	No		
2015	The Virgin Psychics	Gaga	Yes	Yes	No		
2015	The Whispering Star		Yes	Yes	No	Credited as producer.	
2016	Antiporno	Nikkatsu	Yes	Yes	No	Credited as producer.	
2017	Tokyo Vampire Hotel	Amazon Video	Yes	Yes	No		
2017	Shinjuku Swan II		Yes	No	No		
2018	Red Blade		No	Yes	No	Screenplay by Toshiki Kimura (as Ichirô Ryû), story by Sion Sono (as Shion Sono).	
2019	The Forest of Love	Netflix	Yes	Yes	No		
2020	State of Emergency	Amazon Studios	Yes	No	No	Anthology series (segment "Lonely at 7 PM").	
2020	Red Post on Escher Street		Yes	Yes	No	Credited as Film Editor (as Shion Sono).	
2021	Prisoners of the Ghostland	RLJE Films	Yes	No	No	First English-language film	

=== Short films ===
Year	Title	Credited as		
Year	Title	director	screenWriter	Actor
1984	Love Songs	Yes	No	Yes
1985	I Am Sion Sono!!	Yes	Yes	Yes
1986	Love	Yes	Yes	Yes
1995	Vagina and Virgin	Yes	Yes	No
1998	Kaze (Wind)	Yes	Yes	No
2001	0cm4	Yes	Yes	No
2001	Father's Day	Yes	No	No
2010	Karma	No	Yes (Note: Story by Alex Paille)	No
2013	Venice 70: Future Reloaded (Note: Anthology series.)	Yes	No	No
2016	Madly	Yes	No	No
2017	Ami. exe	No	No	Yes
2018	ami.exe	No	No	Yes
2018	The Bastard and the Beautiful World	Yes	Yes	No
2020	The Lonely 19:00	Yes	Yes	No

== Bibliography ==
- Tokyo Gagaga (1993)
- Furo de Yomu Gendai Shi Nyuumon (2000)
- Jisatsu Saakuru: Kanzenban (2002)
- Jikou Keisatsu (2002)
- Yume no Naka e (2005)

== Literature ==
- Fredriksson, Erik (2020). "Ero-Guro-Nansensu in the Japanese Horror Films House, Suicide Club and Dead Sushi" (PDF). Dalarna University.
- Hjelm, Zara Luna (2021). "Embodying the sexed posthuman body of becoming in Sion Sono's Antiporno (アンチポルノ, 2016) and Mika Ninagawa's Helter Skelter (ヘルタースケルター, 2012)". Linköping University.
- Yujie, Lu (2019). "Lacan's Theory of the Mirror Stage about Sion Sono Film Language" (PDF). International Journal of Social Sciences in Universities. 2 (4): 14–19.
