= Be Sure to Share =

2009 Japanese drama film

- Directed by: Sion Sono
- Written by: Sion Sono
- Starring: Akira; Eiji Okuda; Ayumi Ito; Keiko Takahashi
- Cinematography: Shogo Ueno
- Release date: July 5, 2009 (New York Asian Film Festival)
- Running time: 108 minutes
- Country: Japan
- Language: Japanese

Be Sure to Share (ちゃんと伝える, Chanto Tsutaeru) is a 2009 Japanese drama film written and directed by Sion Sono. It screened at the 2009 New York Asian Film Festival.

== Plot ==
Shiro's struggle with his father's cancer and impending death leads to a realization that he must communicate his love and admiration for him before it's too late. A series of flashbacks reveals their relationship over time, and the trouble Shiro faced connecting to his strict father who was also his teacher and soccer coach. With a consuming secret of his own, Shiro, now in his late 20s and about to get engaged, must eventually learn how to share it with his loved ones.

== Reception ==
''Be Sure to Share surely is one of the last movies we would have expected to see from the director of the extreme, Sion Sono.", stated a review on AsianMovieWeb. This surprise is shared by another positive review, finding that the film's "conflicted portrait of machismo humbled before mortality is graced with a climactic act of desperation from Shiro, as moving as it is uncomfortable in expressing the irrationality of love, that leaves this question in a state of agonizing irresolution."
