= Suicide Club (film) =

2001 Japanese independent horror film by Sion Sono

- Promotional release poster
- Directed by: Sion Sono
- Written by: Sion Sono
- Produced by: Seiya Kawamata; Junichi Tanaka; Toshiie Tomida; Seiji Yoshida
- Starring: Ryō Ishibashi; Masatoshi Nagase; Akaji Maro; Saya Hagiwara; Yoko Kamon; Rolly; Hideo Sako; Kimiko Yo; Mika Kikuchi; So Matsumoto; Takashi Nomura
- Cinematography: Kazuto Sato
- Edited by: Akihiro Oonaga
- Music by: Tomoki Hasegawa
- Production company: Omega Project
- Distributed by: Earthrise; TLA Releasing
- Release dates: October 29, 2001 (TIFFF); March 9, 2002 (Japan)
- Running time: 99 minutes
- Country: Japan
- Language: Japanese
- Budget: ¥31.6 million (~$250,000)

Suicide Club (Note: Known in Japan as Suicide Circle (自殺サークル, Jisatsu Sākuru).) is a 2001 Japanese independent horror film written and directed by Sion Sono. It stars Ryō Ishibashi, Masatoshi Nagase, Akaji Maro, Saya Hagiwara, Yoko Kamon, Rolly, Hideo Sako, Kimiko Yo, Mika Kikuchi, So Matsumoto, and Takashi Nomura. The film explores a wave of seemingly unconnected suicides across Japan and the efforts of the police to determine the reasons behind them.

Suicide Club premiered at the Tokyo International Film Festival on October 29, 2001, and was released in Japan on March 9, 2002. It was shown at numerous global film festivals and won the Jury Prize for Most Ground-Breaking Film at the 2003 Fantasia Festival. It has since developed a significant cult following.

== Plot ==
On May 27, 54 teenage girls commit a mass suicide in Tokyo by jumping in front of an oncoming train. Shortly after, at a hospital, two nurses jump out of a window. At both locations, rolls of skin are found, matching the skin removed from the bodies of the dead. Detectives Kuroda, Shibusawa, and Murata are notified by a hacker named Kiyoko of a website called Haikyo ("Ruins"), which displays a red circle for each female suicide victim and a white one for each male.

On May 28, a group of high school students jump off their school building's roof during lunch, sending the city in search of a "Suicide Club". By May 29, the suicide epidemic has spread all over Japan. A man named Masa throws himself off a roof and lands on his girlfriend, Mitsuko, who was on her way home. The roll of skin they receive matches a butterfly tattoo on his back. When Mitsuko is taken to the police station for questioning, they perform a strip search and discover that she has the same tattoo.

On May 30, the police receive a call from a boy, warning them that at 7:30 that evening, another mass suicide will take place at the same platform. The detectives organize a stake-out to prevent it, but nothing happens. Meanwhile, individual and smaller-scale group suicides continue all over Japan, claiming many lives, including Kuroda's entire family. Kuroda receives another call from the boy, whom he accuses of murdering his family. The boy denies this before asking Kuroda what his connection to himself is, and if that connection will vanish in the event of Kuroda's death, unlike the deaths of his family. A second child's voice joins the call and berates Kuroda for his selfishness. Kuroda orders the remaining detectives to launch an investigation into all of the recent suicides before shooting himself in the mouth.

Kiyoko is captured by a group led by a man named Genesis, whose hideout is a small subterranean bowling alley, where he resides with four glam-rock cohorts. Genesis performs a song while a girl in a white sack is brutally raped and killed right in front of Kiyoko. Kiyoko contacts authorities with information about Genesis. On May 31, the police arrest Genesis, who boasts about being the leader of the "Suicide Club".

On June 1, Mitsuko goes to Masa's home to return his helmet. She observes posters of pop group Dessert on the wall and notices a pattern on the fingers of the group that corresponds to the letters on a telephone keypad spelling out the word "suicide". The boy from earlier calls to inform her that there is no "Suicide Club" and invite her to a secret concert.

The next day, at the concert, Mitsuko sneaks into the backstage area and sees a group of young children in the audience. They ask her if she is connected to herself. When she asserts that she is, they cheer before leading her into a room and cutting the butterfly tattoo out of her skin with a kezuriki.

A new roll of skin ends up with the police. Shibusawa recognizes Mitsuko's tattoo. That evening, he sees Mitsuko at the train station and grabs her hand, but she pulls away. She boards the train and stares at Shibusawa as it departs the station.

Dessert later announces their disbandment and offers gratitude for their fans' support before performing their final song, "Live as You Please".

== Cast ==
- Ryō Ishibashi as Detective Kuroda
- Masatoshi Nagase as Detective Shibusawa
- Akaji Maro as Detective Murata
- Saya Hagiwara as Mitsuko
- Yoko Kamon as Kiyoko/Kōmori-The Bat
- Rolly as Muneo "Genesis" Suzuki
- Hideo Sako as Detective Hagitani
- Kimiko Yo as Kiyomi Kuroda
- Mika Kikuchi as Sakura Kuroda
- So Matsumoto as Toru Kuroda
- Takashi Nomura as Security Guard Jiro Suzuki
- Tamao Satō as Nurse Yoko Kawaguchi
- Mai Hōshō as Nurse Atsuko Sawada

== Themes and interpretation ==
The film explores the consistent increase in the suicide rates of Japanese children and youth since 1998, which has emerged as one of the most pressing problems of contemporary Japanese society. Japan has a very specific history relating to suicide and a wide range of its concepts, starting with the ancient and highly romanticized seppuku and shinjū. Social pressure is also extremely high in the country; failures, misfortunes, and mental issues are highly stigmatized and condemned. For example, a train company will charge the family of a person who dies by jumping in front of a train, and banks encourage debtors to take out life insurance policies on themselves. The film explores this attitude and Japan's resulting loneliness, isolation, epidemic of low self-esteem, and trivialization of life, as well as the psychoses of 21st century society. Sono, who blames the media and how it contributes to mounting peer pressure, has called online communication "suicidal".

Greg Falla used it in his book, Sado Mass Essayist: Certified Loverboy, Certified Cinephile, to explore how Japan is represented as a character in many Japanese movies. The importance of the spiral symbolism, the disconnect between the pioneering tech-age in a fundamentalist and traditionally conservative country, and Japan's pseudo-romanticised history with suicide from the days of the samurai until modern day pressures, are all expanded upon. Falla notes that Sion pioneered the real concerns in the modern age on online chatrooms before the dangers were truly known.

== Release and reception ==
Suicide Club gained considerable notoriety across film festivals around the world for its controversial, transgressive subject matter and gruesome presentation. It developed a significant cult following over the years, and won the Jury Prize for Most Ground-Breaking Film at the 2003 Fantasia Festival.

Virginie Sélavy of Electric Sheep Magazine wrote, "Suicide Club has been described as 'muddled' and Sono criticised for not making his satire of pop culture and denunciation of the media clear enough. But the ambiguity of the film is precisely what makes it interesting." Andrew Borntrager called the film "a surreal cult classic full of existential dread and poignant social commentary". According to Jenn Coulter from Visual Cult magazine, the film is "a visual smorgasbord of disturbing imagery". Coulter also mentions that it is almost impossible to explain the plot, determine the genre of the film, or even name the main characters, but overall it adds up to a disturbing yet important cinematic experience.

Justine Peres Smith stated that Suicide Club has "thinly veiled leads", but that sticking to their individuality in "a world where characters want to cease their existence" would be counterintuitive. According to Smith, Sono channels a direct opposite of almost all Western cinema: instead of individualism, dictated by capitalism, he shows the desire to be consumed by the void.

On the review aggregator website Rotten Tomatoes, 63% of 8 critics' reviews are positive, with an average rating of 5.8/10.

== Prequel ==
The prequel Noriko's Dinner Table (2005) depicts events from before and after the happenings of Suicide Club and gives more insight on its predecessor. Sono also had plans for a sequel that has not been made as of 2025, stating that he "always wanted to make a trilogy but in reality it is very difficult".

== Print publications ==
=== Novel ===
Jisatsu Saakuru: Kanzenban (自殺サークル 完全版, translated as Suicide Circle: The Complete Edition) was written by Sion Sono in April 2002. The book deals with the themes of Suicide Club and Noriko's Dinner Table, bringing the two plots closer. So far no plans for an English edition have appeared.

=== Manga ===
A manga of the same title and written by Usamaru Furuya appeared at the same time as the movie's Japanese DVD release. Although Furuya's intention was to faithfully reproduce the film's plot, Sono asked him to write his own story. As a result, the Suicide Club manga is much more straightforward and easier to understand than the film, and features much more solid character development. It deals with the same opening scene, but there is a twist: out of the 54 suicidal girls, a survivor is reported: Saya Kota. Her best friend, Kyoko, must now unveil the secret of the Suicide Club and save Saya from falling deeper into it.

== See also ==
- Copycat suicide

== Literature ==
- Fredriksson, Erik (2020). "Ero-Guro-Nansensu in the Japanese Horror Films House, Suicide Club and Dead Sushi" (PDF). Dalarna University.
- Murguía, Salvador Jimenez (2016). The Encyclopedia of Japanese Horror Films. Rowman&Littlefield. p. 291. ISBN 9781442261679.
