= Exte =

- Directed by: Sion Sono
- Written by: Sion Sono; Masaki Adachi
- Produced by: Makoto Okada
- Starring: Chiaki Kuriyama; Ren Osugi; Megumi Sato; Tsugumi
- Cinematography: Hiroo Yanagida
- Edited by: Junichi Ito
- Music by: Tomoki Hasegawa
- Distributed by: Toei Company
- Release date: February 17, 2007
- Running time: 108 minutes
- Country: Japan
- Language: Japanese

Exte (エクステ, Ekusute) is a 2007 Japanese supernatural horror film written and directed by Sion Sono, and stars Chiaki Kuriyama, Ren Osugi, and Megumi Satō. The title is a Japanese slang shortening Romanization of the English term "extension" from "hair extension".

The plot involves an aspiring hairdresser (Kuriyama) who becomes the infatuation of a trichophile man who sells hair extensions to nearby hair salons. The source of the hair is the stolen corpse of a girl whose dead body continues to grow beautiful and voluminous black hair that comes alive, driving those who use the extensions insane or killing them. The movie was released in the U.S. as Exte: Hair Extensions.

== Plot ==
Inside a shipping container, customs agents discover a huge amount of human hair used as materials for hair extensions, along with the body of a young girl with a shaved head. The corpse is transported to the morgue, where it is discovered that the girl's internal organs have been harvested by illegal organ traffickers. The morgue's night watchman, a trichophile named Yamazaki (Ren Osugi), is infatuated by the girl's hair and steals the body. He finds that the body has begun to grow hair everywhere, not just on every pore but in areas that shouldn't have hair: the head, vacant eye sockets, tongue, and open wounds. A delighted Yamazaki harvests the hair to make hair extensions to sell. However, the hair controls and kills its wearers, causing them to experience the dying memories of the dead girl, including the last thing she saw on the operating table: the smiling mouth of the man who killed her, unbeknownst to Yamazaki.

Yuko (Chiaki Kuriyama) is a young apprentice hair stylist at a local salon. Her irresponsible older sister, Kiyomi (Tsugumi), dumps her eight-year-old daughter, Mami, on Yuko and her roommate Yuki (Megumi Satō). By happenstance Yamazaki encounters Yuko and Mami and finds their hair beautiful. He comes to Yuko's salon the next day with his hair extensions, which her co-workers are impressed with. That night, Kondo, one of Yuko's co-workers, is killed when the hair begins sprouting from her eyes, head, and mouth. It is revealed through a flashback that the dead girl's head was shaved by her kidnappers before her murder. Meanwhile, Yuko and Yuki refuse to return Mami to Kiyomi due to her abuse of the child. Kiyomi returns while they are away and drags Mami back to her boyfriend's home, taking some of the hair extensions with her. After Mami is locked in a closet, the extensions kill Kiyomi and her boyfriend. Mami escapes the hair by jumping out of the window, injuring herself.

Yuko later uses Mami as her model in a hairdressing workshop and attaches one of Yamazaki's hair extensions to her hair and lets Mami keep the extensions as she goes back home. The workshop is then interrupted by detectives investigating Kondo's and another costumer's death who also acquired the hair extensions. Yuko realizes that the hair extensions are the linking factor in the deaths and races home to save Mami. Yuki is strangled to death by the hair and Mami faints. Yuko arrives at the hair-filled apartment but is choked unconscious by the hair. Yamazaki arrives and commands the hair to spare Mami and Yuko. He takes them back to his hair-covered home. There, he discovers the detectives caught in the hair, who searched his house because of the deaths. He kills them as Yuko wakes up.

Yamazaki explains that he has learned that the girl's hair keeps growing to carry on her grudge against society. He wishes for Mami and Yuko to stay with him and the corpse forever. Yuko rejects him; Yamazaki, enraged, allows the hair to possess him; his tongue becomes hairy, and his blood and limbs replaced by hair. In anger, he cuts some of Mami's hair, which begins to bleed. The blood and Yamazaki's smiling cause the corpse to associate him with the man who killed her, and she suddenly sits up and slices him to pieces with strands of hair while Yuko and Mami escape. Her grudge satisfied, the hair disappears, and the girl's body returns to normal, finally at peace. Yuko asks Mami to live with her permanently, which Mami happily accepts.

== Cast ==
- Chiaki Kuriyama - Yuko Mizushima
- Ren Osugi - Gunji Yamazaki
- Megumi Sato - Yuki Morita
- Tsugumi - Kiyomi Mizushima
- Eri Machimoto - Sachi Koda
- Yuna Natsuo - Kondo
- Miku Sato - Mami Mizushima
- Mirai Yamamoto - Kayo Sugimura
- Mayu Sakuma - Bald foreign girl

== Trivia ==
Mayu Sakuma, who played the foreign girl, actually shaved her head on-screen for the role.
