= Love & Peace (film) =

2015 Japanese fantasy film

- Poster
- ラブ＆ピース
- Directed by: Sion Sono
- Written by: Sion Sono
- Starring: Kumiko Asō; Hiroki Hasegawa
- Production companies: Asmik Ace Entertainment; Gansis; King Records
- Distributed by: Asmik Ace Entertainment
- Release date: June 27, 2015
- Running time: 117 minutes
- Country: Japan
- Language: Japanese
- Box office: ¥13.4 million

Love & Peace (ラブ＆ピース) is a 2015 Japanese tokusatsu fantasy drama film directed by Sion Sono. It was released on June 27, 2015.

== Plot ==
Ryo is a failed musician who now works in an office with Yuko, the woman of his dreams. He buys a pet turtle and names it Pikadon but is ridiculed for it at his office so he flushes it down the toilet, which he immediately regrets doing.

Pikadon finds a home among abandoned dolls in the sewer, where it is given a magical candy that allows it to grant Ryo's wish to become a successful musician. Ryo is inspired to write a song about missing Pikadon that becomes and unexpected hit when he performs it live with the band Revolution Q. The band's management replaces the name "Pikadon" with "Love & Peace" and plans out Ryo's career, starting with quitting his job.

Pikadon grows bigger as Ryo's wishes grow bigger, and it returns to Ryo to provide him with a new ballad. Ryo rebrands himself as a solo artist with his former bandmates as his backing band. Pikadon is captured and taken to a laboratory for experiments, but outgrows its bonds when Ryo holds a live concert at Nippon Stadium on December 25, eventually growing to the size of a kaiju and rampaging through the city until it reaches the stadium, where it confesses Ryo's love for Yuko.

Ryo runs out of the stadium and returns to his small apartment, where he finds that Pikadon has returned to its normal size. Outside, Yuko hesitantly approaches his apartment.

== Cast ==
- Hiroki Hasegawa
- Kumiko Asō
- Kiyohiko Shibukawa
- Eita Okuno
- Makitasupōtsu
- Motoki Fukami
- Tooru Tezuka
- Miyuki Matsuda
- Toshiyuki Nishida

== Reception ==
=== Commercial ===
The film earned ¥13.4 million at the Japanese box office on its opening weekend.

=== Reviews ===
Peter Debruge of Variety wrote, "If you see just one new Sion Sono movie this year (and you potentially have as many as six to choose from, considering his current rate of output), make it “Love & Peace,” the wonderfully daffy passion project it reportedly took the appallingly prolific helmer more than two decades to make [ ... ] though “Love & Peace” is endearing in its own scrappily uneven way, he'd do well to slow things down in the future, lest he end up permanently labeled as the country's next Takashi Miike."

== See also ==
- Gamera the Brave
