= Megumi Kagurazaka =

Japanese actress and glamour model (born 1981)

- Born: September 28, 1981 (age 45); Okayama, Chūgoku, Japan
- Occupations: Actress; gravure model
- Years active: 2006–present
- Spouse: Sion Sono (m. 2011)

Megumi Kagurazaka (神楽坂 恵, Kagurazaka Megumi; born September 28, 1981) is a Japanese actress and gravure model. She is married to the director Sion Sono and has starred in seven of his films, including Cold Fish, Guilty of Romance and The Land of Hope.

== Filmography ==
=== Films ===
- Into the Faraway Sky (2007)
- Gakkō no kaidan (2007) as Noriko Mamiya
- Hanky-Panky Baby (2008)
- Spy Girl's Mission Cord #005 (2008)
- Dotei Horoki (2009)
- Pride (2009) as Morita
- Oyasumi Ammonite (2010)
- The Parasite Doctor Suzune: Genesis x Evolution (2011) as Naomi
- Guilty of Romance (2011) as Izumi Kikuchi
- Cold Fish (2010) as Taeko Shamoto
- The Land of Hope (2012) as Izumi
- Himizu (2012) as Keiko Tamura
- The Incredible Truth (2013) as Shimizu Machiko
- Why Don't You Play in Hell? (2013) as Junko
- The Whispering Star (2015) as Yoko Suzuki
- The Virgin Psychics (2015) as Akiyama Takako
- Tokyo Vampire Hotel (2017) as Elizabeth Bathory

=== Television ===
- Shiawase no Jikan (2012) Yōko Takamura
- Minna! ESPer Dayo! (2013) as Akiyama Takako
- All Esper Dayo! SP (2015) (television special) as Akiyama Takako
