= Guilty of Romance =

- UK VHS cover
- Directed by: Sion Sono
- Screenplay by: Sion Sono
- Story by: Misue Kunizane
- Produced by: Yoshinori Chiba; Nobuhiro Iizuka
- Starring: Miki Mizuno; Makoto Togashi; Megumi Kagurazaka
- Cinematography: Sōhei Tanikawa
- Edited by: Jun'ichi Itō
- Music by: Yasuhiro Morinaga
- Production companies: Django Film; Nikkatsu
- Distributed by: Nikkatsu
- Release date: 12 November 2011
- Running time: 144 minutes
- Country: Japan
- Language: Japanese

Guilty of Romance (恋の罪, Koi no Tsumi) is a 2011 Japanese erotic romantic thriller film directed by Sion Sono. Sono's screenplay is based on a story by Misue Kunizane, which was inspired by the 1997 murder of Yasuko Watanabe. The plot follows two interweaving storylines, the first involving the investigation of a murder in a Tokyo love hotel district, the second about a neglected wife (played by Sono's wife Megumi Kagurazaka) seeking her carnal desires through nude modeling and prostitution.

Two versions of the film exist: the original Japanese cut (144 minutes) and an international edit (113 minutes). The former is currently unavailable outside of Japan, France, Germany, and the United States.

== Plot ==
A grisly murder occurs in Maruyama-cho, Shibuya, Tokyo – a love hotel district – where a woman is found dead in a derelict apartment. As the police investigate, the story interweaves with that of Izumi, the wife of a famous romantic novelist whose life seems just a daily repetition without romance. One day, to break away from the loveless monotony, she decides to follow her desires and accepts a job as a nude model enacting sex in front of the camera. Soon she meets with a mentor and starts selling her body to strangers, while at home she hides behind the facade that she is still the wife she is supposed to be.

== Cast ==
- Miki Mizuno – Kazuko
- Makoto Togashi – Mitsuko
- Megumi Kagurazaka – Izumi

== Production ==
The cast features Megumi Kagurazaka, Sono's wife and a very regular collaborator of his.

== Reception ==
A review on the website The Spinning Image states that 'All the way through this microscopic scrutiny of (the film's) lead character and how she reacts to this underworld(,) Sion (Sono) conjured up a variety of strange scenes designed to disturb". A review in Variety, although praising the film, states what follows:"Kafkaesque storytelling, which intertwines the stories of three women grappling with sex for money and murder, is again inspired by fact, but the feverish imagery remains the director's own. Despite a muddled ending, this will be a "Guilty" pleasure for the helmer's fans and genre aficionados, though it won't broaden Sono's niche appeal."
