= Tag (2015 film) =

2015 Japanese action horror film

- Theatrical release poster
- リアル鬼ごっこ
- Directed by: Sion Sono
- Screenplay by: Sion Sono
- Based on: Riaru Onigokko by Yusuke Yamada
- Starring: Reina Triendl; Mariko Shinoda; Erina Mano
- Music by: Mono
- Production company: Sedic Deux Inc.
- Distributed by: Shochiku; Asmik Ace Entertainment; Universal Pictures Japan (via NBCUniversal Entertainment Japan)
- Release date: July 11, 2015
- Running time: 85 minutes
- Country: Japan
- Language: Japanese

Tag, known in Japan as Real Onigokko (Japanese: リアル鬼ごっこ, Hepburn: Riaru Onigokko; lit. 'Real Tag'), is a 2015 Japanese action horror film directed by Sion Sono and based on the novel Riaru Onigokko by Yusuke Yamada. It was released in Japan on July 11, 2015. The film's theme song, "Real Onigokko", was written and performed for the movie by the rock band Glim Spanky.

The film received positive reviews. Critics noted its feminist undertones. It won awards at the 2015 Fantasia Film Festival for Best Film and Best Actress and 2015 Fancine Malaga for best film.

== Plot ==
A quiet high school girl named Mitsuko survives a gust of wind that slices through her school bus, bisecting everyone else on board. The wind chases her and kills all the other girls she comes into contact with. She enters a high school campus and is greeted by three girls, Aki, Sur, and Taeko. Aki comforts her and the girls cut class and go to the woods. They muse about whether there are multiple realities with multiple versions of themselves.

Back at school, Mitsuko's teacher kills all the girls except Mitsuko with a mini gun. Mitsuko, Sur, and Taeko reach a different classroom where they see another girl, who is killed by her teacher. Taeko tries to attack the teacher, but she dies. As Sur and Mitsuko try to escape, Sur is shot. As Mitsuko runs out of the school, other classes are also fleeing from their rooms and run out of the school building as the teachers fire guns and rocket launchers at the students, but five of the girls, including Mitsuko manages to run out of the school. As the remaining girls flee, the wind slices them, leaving Mitsuko alone again.

Mitsuko then wanders into town, where she is recognized by a police officer as Keiko. Mitsuko is horrified when the police officer puts a mirror to her and her appearance has completely changed. She is then taken into the police officer's car for her wedding. At the wedding, she recognizes Aki as one of the bridesmaids. She is then changed into a wedding outfit. Aki, with the help of Keiko, proceeds to kill all the bridesmaids who were helping Keiko get ready. Keiko, holding a broken bottle, walks up to the groom, who is in a coffin. The girls then begin stripping to bikinis, acting as if they were at a party. The coffin opens to reveal a pig head as a groom, and the girls walk up to her, and try to make Keiko kiss the pig head. After a little struggle, Keiko eventually stabs the groom in the neck, and it falls lifeless to the ground. Everyone begins freaking out, and the teachers from the school show up, in more "bad-ass" attire, and attack Aki and Keiko. After a while, Aki and Keiko win, and as they are leaving, Aki splits from Keiko to 'distract him.'

Mitsuko eventually finds her way to a bridge, where a girl tells her to follow her. She does, and the two end up in the middle of a marathon run. Mitsuko's identity has once again changed to Izumi. She passes a mirror and is horrified to see that her appearance has changed from a bloody wedding outfit to a marathon runner's outfit. She eventually finds Aki, Sur, and Taeko, who are all running the race. The teachers and the pig head chase the girls and kick the other runners out of the way. She is then told to take a shortcut, where she finds a cave.

In that cave, she encounters a group of revenant girls who try to kill her, stating that so long as she lives, they will continue to die. She is rescued by Aki, who reveals that they are all in a fictional world being observed by "someone" and that this "someone" will continue to kill everyone else unless Mitsuko, as the "main character", does something to change it. Each of the scenarios is a different world, and to reach the final one, Aki says that Mitsuko must brutally kill her by pulling cables from her arms.

She finds herself in a lewd city called "Men's World," filled with only men who enjoy a violent 3D survival horror video game called Tag, depicting Mitsuko, Keiko, and Izumi as playable characters. She passes out and awakens in a temple where all the girls are showcased like mannequins. She finds a decrepit old man playing the game on his TV, showing the various trials she went through, and is horrified to see full-size models of herself, Keiko, Izumi, Aki, and all the other girls. The man tells her that she is in the future; 150 years ago, she was a girl he had admired as a fellow student. When she died, he took her DNA and that of her friends and made clones for his 3D game. A younger version of the old man appears and strips, beckoning her to come to bed with him. The old man tells her that this final stage is the fulfillment of his deepest wish: to sleep with her.

Mitsuko attacks the younger man, screaming at him to stop playing with girls like toys. She rips one of the pillows, showering the room with feathers. Remembering what Sur said about tricking fate, she commits suicide, to the shock of the old man, who had not made that part of his game. Finding herself once again in the beginning of each scenario, she simultaneously commits suicide on the bus, at the wedding, and during the marathon before any of the violent scenarios can begin. She then awakens alone in a field of white snow and runs away, realizing that "it's over now".

== Cast ==
- Reina Triendl as Mitsuko
- Mariko Shinoda as Keiko
- Erina Mano as Izumi
- Yuki Sakurai as Aki
- Maryjun Takahashi as Jun
- Sayaka Isoyama as Mutsuko
- Takumi Saito as Old Man/Young Man
- Ami Tomite as Sur
- Aki Hiraoka as Taeko

== Reception ==
Tag has an 92% approval rating on Rotten Tomatoes based on 13 reviews with an average score of 6.9/10. In Variety, Richard Kuipers described Tag as "grindhouse meets arthouse", praising the acting and photography. Clarence Tsui of The Hollywood Reporter lauded the work as "by turns absurd and affecting, bloody and beautiful, carnal and cerebral." Both critics noted the film's feminist undertones.

== Awards ==
Year	Organization	Award	Result
2015	Fantasia Film Festival	Best Film	Won
2015	Fantasia Film Festival	Best Actress (Reina Triendl)	Won
2015	Fancine Malaga	Best film	Won
