= Wait and See (1998 film) =

- Film poster
- Directed by: Shinji Sōmai
- Screenplay by: Takehiro Nakajima
- Based on: Ah, haru by Masahiko Murakami
- Produced by: Nozomu Enoki; Takashi Yajima
- Starring: Kōichi Satō; Yuki Saito; Sumiko Fuji; Tsutomu Yamazaki
- Cinematography: Matsuo Naganuma
- Edited by: Yoshiyuki Okuhara
- Music by: Otomo Yoshihide
- Production companies: Shōchiku; Eisei Gekijo; Trum
- Distributed by: Shōchiku
- Release date: 19 December 1998 (Japan)
- Running time: 100 minutes
- Country: Japan
- Language: Japanese

Wait and See (Japanese: あ、春, romanized: Ah, haru) is a 1998 Japanese drama film directed by Shinji Sōmai.

== Cast ==
- Kōichi Satō as Hiroshi Nirasaki
- Yuki Saito as Mizuho
- Sumiko Fuji as Kimiyi, Hiroshi's Mother
- Tsutomu Yamazaki as Sasaichi
- Shiho Fujimura as Mizuho's Mother
- Tomokazu Miura as Hiroshi's Brother
- Kimiko Yo as Wife of Hiroshi's Brother
- Shinya Tsukamoto as Doctor
- Shōfukutei Tsurube II as Shinto Priest
- Takehiro Murata as Sawachika, Hiroshi's Partner
- Minori Terada as Truck Driver
- Chisako Hara as Mizuho's Aunt
- Michiko Kawai as Nurse
- Houka Kinoshita as Drunk Man
- Kyōko Mitsubayashi as Yaeko Togashi, Sasaichi's Wife
- Keita Okada as Mitsuru, Hiroshi's Son
- Makoto Kakeda as Office Worker

== Awards and nominations ==
73rd Kinema Junpo Best Ten Awards

- Won: Best Film
- Won: Best Supporting Actress (Sumiko Fuji)

53rd Mainichi Film Awards

- Won: Best Supporting Actress (Kimiko Yo)
- Won: Best Screenplay (Takehiro Nakajima, also won for Love Letter)

41st Blue Ribbon Awards

- Won: Best Supporting Actress (Kimiko Yo)

24th Hochi Film Awards

- Best Actor (Tomokazu Miura, also won for M/Other)
- Best Supporting Actress (Sumiko Fuji, also won for The Geisha House and Dreammaker)

49th Berlin International Film Festival

- Won: FIPRESCI Prize (Panorama) – "For the originality with which it explores the familiar territory of the domestic drama and the consistent excellence of its performances."
