= Symphony No. 4 (Tchaikovsky) =

Symphony by Pyotr Ilyich Tchaikovsky

- by Pyotr Ilyich Tchaikovsky
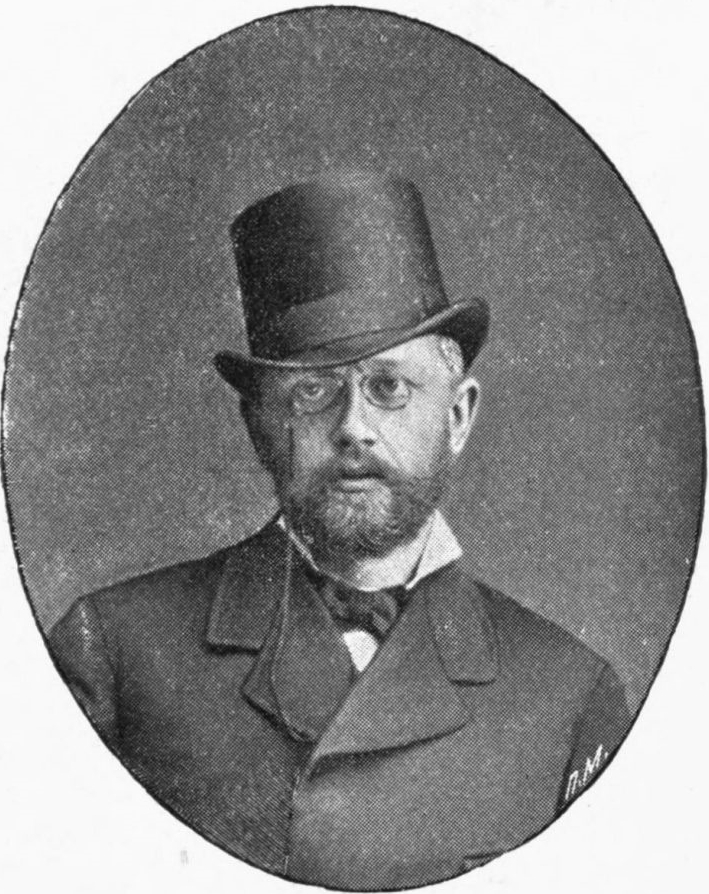
- The composer, c. 1877
- Key: F minor
- Opus: 36
- Composed: 1877–1878
- Dedication: Nadezhda von Meck
- Movements: 4

Premiere
- Date: 22 February 1878
- Location: Moscow
- Conductor: Nikolai Rubinstein

Pyotr Ilyich Tchaikovsky's Symphony No. 4 in F minor, Op. 36, was written between 1877 and 1878. Its first performance was at a Russian Musical Society concert in Moscow on February 22 (or the 10th using the calendar of the time), 1878, with Nikolai Rubinstein as conductor. In Central Europe it sometimes receives the nickname "Fatum", or "Fate".

A typical performance lasts about 40 minutes.

== Composition ==
During the composition of the symphony, Tchaikovsky wrote to his patroness, Nadezhda von Meck, that he wanted "very much" to dedicate it to her, and that he would write on it "Dedicated to My Best Friend". He had begun composing the symphony not long after von Meck had entered his life. He would complete it in the aftermath of his catastrophic marriage and claimed she would find in it "an echo of your most intimate thoughts and emotions." Maes asserts that the dedication was significant in more than one way. One important facet of the paternalistic nature of Russian society was that, in artistic patronage, patron and artist were considered equals. Dedications of works to patrons were not gestures of humble gratitude but expressions of artistic partnership. By dedicating the Fourth Symphony to her, he was affirming her as an equal partner in its creation.

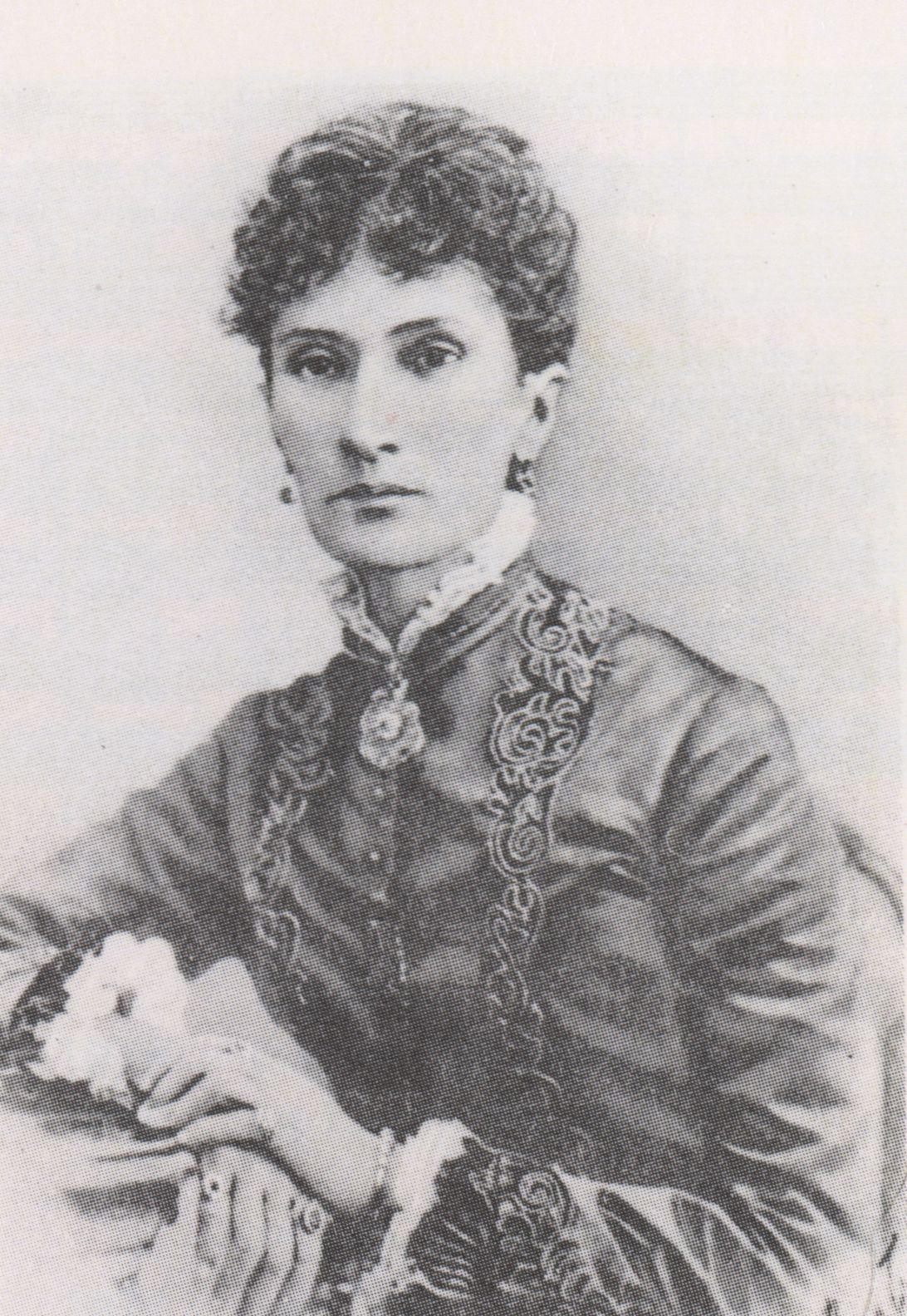
Nadezhda von Meck

It is also due to Madame von Meck that, at her request, Tchaikovsky wrote a program explaining the symphony. This action encouraged numerous writers to quote it instead of focusing on the symphony's purely musical qualities, including what Hans Keller termed "one of the most towering symphonic structures in our whole literature" in the opening movement. This program hindered acceptance of the symphony for many years, prejudicing Alfred Einstein and other musicologists against it. But this must be seen in the context of Einstein's general lack of sympathy for Tchaikovsky's music.

But despite this negative impact on the symphony's reception history, the composer's program gives one very telling clue regarding the work's musical architecture. Assertions to the effect that "the first movement represents Fate" are oversimplifications: according to a letter the composer wrote to Madame von Meck in 1878, it is actually the fanfare first heard at the opening ("the kernel, the quintessence, the chief thought of the whole symphony") that stands for "Fate", with this being "the fatal power which prevents one from attaining the goal of happiness ... There is nothing to be done but to submit to it and lament in vain". As the composer explained it, the programme of the first movement is—"roughly"—that "all life is an unbroken alternation of hard reality with swiftly passing dreams and visions of happiness ...". He went on: "No haven exists ... Drift upon that sea until it engulfs and submerges you in its depths".

The composer's description of the symphony's opening fanfare as a metaphor for "Fate" becomes more telling in the context of a letter he wrote Sergei Taneyev. He wrote Taneyev that the Fourth Symphony was both program music and a reflection of Beethoven's Fifth Symphony in the central idea of its program. Keller has mentioned a parallel between the four-note motif which opens Beethoven's Fifth and the fanfare at the outset of Tchaikovsky's Fourth. Like Beethoven, Tchaikovsky uses his fanfare as a structural marker. Moreover, because of both the length and unorthodox form of the symphony, he may have felt using such a marker was a musical necessity.

== Music ==
The symphony is scored for piccolo, 2 flutes, 2 oboes, 2 clarinets, 2 bassoons, 4 horns, 2 trumpets, 3 trombones, tuba, timpani, bass drum, cymbals, triangle, and strings.

The symphony is in four movements:

1. Andante sostenuto – Moderato con anima (F minor) – Moderato assai, quasi Andante (B major – F major) – Allegro vivo (F minor)
2. Andantino in modo di canzona (B♭ minor – F major–– B♭ minor)
3. Scherzo: Pizzicato ostinato – Allegro (F major – Trio in A major and D♭ major)
4. Finale: Allegro con fuoco (F major)

I. Andante sostenuto – Moderato con anima

II. Andantino in modo di canzona

III. Scherzo. Pizzicato ostinato, allegro

IV. Finale. Allegro con fuoco
Performed by the Vienna Philharmonic under Wilhelm Furtwängler, 1951.

=== I. Andante sostenuto – Moderato con anima – Moderato assai, quasi Andante – Allegro vivo (F minor) ===
The symphony opens with horns and woodwinds, and trumpets join with a higher A♭. As the music solidifies into large, slow syncopated chords, Tchaikovsky unleashes the musical equivalent of lightning bolts: two short fortissimo chords, each followed by a long measure of silence.

As the music ebbs away, the woodwinds hint at the main melody, which is properly introduced by the strings at the Moderato con anima. (The score at this point is marked "In movimento di Valse", as it is written in 9/8.) The melody develops quite rapidly. Much later in the movement, the same A♭ is played by the trumpets. This movement is marked by continual introductions of the fate motif, the A♭ phrase. The motif serves as a separation between each section of the sonata-allegro form.

At around 20 minutes in length in some performances, this is one of the longest symphonic movements by Tchaikovsky. It is also just short of the length of the remaining movements combined.

=== II. Andantino in modo di canzona ===
The second movement is introduced by the melancholy melody of the oboe. The music's impassioned climax is a reminder of the grieving phrases that dominated the opening movement.

=== III. Scherzo: Pizzicato ostinato – Allegro ===
Strings play pizzicato throughout the third movement. They are joined by the woodwinds later when an oboe's long, high A signals the start of the A major Trio section. Later, the brass instruments come in, playing very quietly and staccato as the key modulates to D♭ major. The three groups (strings, woodwinds, and brass) are the only groups that play; there is no percussion in this movement except for the timpani, as in the previous movement. It ends quietly with pizzicato strings.

=== IV. Finale: Allegro con fuoco ===
In the vigorous finale, Tchaikovsky incorporates a famous Russian folk song, "In the Field Stood a Birch Tree", as the secondary theme — firstly in A minor, the second time in B♭ minor and then in D minor, which leads to the A♭ phrase of the first movement, with the 'lightning bolts', with cymbals added, being much louder. The coda is also vigorous and triumphant.

== Structure ==
=== Challenges ===
The Fourth Symphony is where Tchaikovsky's struggles with Western sonata form came to a head. In some ways he was not alone. In Cooper it is asserted that the Romantics in general were never natural symphonists because music was to them primarily evocative and biographical. Western musical form, as developed primarily by Germanic composers, was analytical and architectural; it simply was not designed to handle the personal emotions the Romantics wished to express, while the difference with Tchaikovsky was that while the other Romantics remained generally autobiographical in what they wanted to express, he became more specific and, consequently, more intense.

In his first three symphonies he had striven to stay within strict Western form. The turbulent changes in his personal life, including his marital crisis, now led him to write music so strongly personal and expressive that structural matters could not stay as they had been. Beginning with the Fourth Symphony, the symphony served as a human document—dramatic, autobiographical, concerned not with everyday things but with things psychological. Brown claims this was because Tchaikovsky's creative impulses had become unprecedentedly personal, urgent, capable of enormous expressive forcefulness, even violence.

Along with this emotional urgency came an unprecedented flow of melody. Here, Tchaikovsky developed his gift for tunefulness more freely and deployed it more liberally than he had previously. Warrack asserts that, paradoxically, this great asset also became his greatest enemy in terms of form. A melody is complete on its own terms. Because of this completeness, it stands apart from other themes meant not only to contrast, but more importantly to interact and build upon one another naturally. According to Warrack, this dominance of one melody can ruin the balance and proportion Western classical composers considered the proper beauties of sonata form.

It is asserted in Cooper that the combination of emotional urgency and supercharged melody precluded musical development not only because of the completeness of the melody, but also because the melody's emotional content was already in full bloom, with all the emotional and musical interest it could bear. Since musical development is a creative unfolding of the latent possibilities—rhythmic, melodic and harmonic—of contrasting themes, there was literally nothing to develop further. The only course of action left was to substitute repetition for true development—in other words, to say again in a different way what has already been said and to trust the beauty and significance of what are fundamentally variations to supply the place of a development section as demanded by sonata form.

=== Symphonic hybrid ===
Like "The Five," Tchaikovsky found that with a loose symphonic-poem type of structure pioneered by Franz Liszt, he could combine large-scale orchestral writing with emotions and instrumental colors toward which he gravitated naturally. The result was a symphonic hybrid, a cross between the primarily architectural form of the symphony and the primarily "literary" or "poetic" form of the symphonic poem. This is what he wrote to Nadezhda von Meck, regarding the Fourth Symphony,

You ask if I keep to established forms. Yes and no. There are certain kinds of compositions which imply the use of familiar forms, for example symphony. Here I keep in general outline to the usual traditional forms, but only in general outline, i.e. the sequence of the work's movements. The details can be treated very freely, if this is demanded by the development of the ideas. For instance, in our symphony the first movement is written with very marked digressions. The second subject, which should be in the relative major, is minor and remote. In the recapitulation of the main part of the movement the second subject does not appear at all, etc. The finale, too, is made up of a whole row of derivations from individual forms.....

This hybrid form allowed Tchaikovsky to fall back on a structure that was basically a series of self-contained sections, emphasizing the contrast between these sections, however violent, while allowing the consequent drama to erupt in the context of one movement. This perhaps seemed only natural—many Russian folk songs are actually a series of variations on one basic shape or pattern of a few notes, so it was something with which Tchaikovsky was already familiar. The problem it did not solve was the problem of inertia. The key of the music could change, but the music itself would basically repeat itself, remaining static in the Western sense of musical architecture.

However, structure in Tchaikovsky's work became more than purely architecture. Melody, tonality, rhythm and orchestral timbres work together to form an indivisible whole. In the first movement of the Fourth Symphony, he introduces a highly rhythmic theme in the brass. The structure of this movement is made up of a complete series of rotating thirds, from F to A♭, B D and back to F, then a recapitulation to a third below the tonic. The brass theme delineates each stage of the structure. To heighten drama, he focuses mainly on rhythm, texture and orchestral color. The resulting tension in the first movement does not come from a Germanic transformation of themes. It results from rhythmic opposition between the polonaise rhythm of the aggressive "Fate" motif in the brass and the gentler waltz of the first theme, carried alternately by woodwinds and strings.

=== Imperial apotheosis ===
The finale of this symphony is generally judged by its success in rounding off the symphonic cycle into a cohesive whole. Tchaikovsky here repeats the "Fate" motif which opened the piece. However, it could be said to appeal to the patriotic and heroic feelings of his aristocratic listeners. This would place it in line with the finales of Tchaikovsky's three earlier symphonies as an apotheosis in Imperial style.

== Performance history ==
List of notable performances of Tchaikovsky's fourth symphony, during and shortly after his life.

- Paris, France: 25 January 1880, conducted by Édouard Colonne
- Pavlovsk, Russian Empire: 10 September 1888, conducted by Julius Laube
- Dresden, German Empire: 20 February 1889, conducted by Tchaikovsky himself
- New York, United States: 1 February 1890, conducted by Walter Damrosch at the Metropolitan Opera House
- Kiev, Russian Empire: 17 December 1890, conducted by Aleksandr Vinogradsky
- London, Great Britain: 1 June 1893, conducted by Tchaikovsky himself at St James's Hall
- Amsterdam, Netherlands: 9 November 1893, conducted by Willem Kes at Concertgebouw
- Prague, Austria-Hungary: 3 February 1896, conducted by Vasily Safonov at the National Theatre
- Amsterdam, Netherlands: 27 February 1896, conducted by Willem Mengelberg at Concertgebouw

== Criticism ==
Initial critical reaction to the work was unfavorable. Tchaikovsky was in Florence, Italy when the symphony was premiered and received word only from von Meck at first. His closest friends were so unsure about parts of the work that they did not say anything to him. A telegram from Rubinstein and the other musicians involved in the performances assured him only that the symphony had been well played. After a month, the composer wrote to Sergei Taneyev. Taneyev replied promptly and, per his nature, all too honestly. Taneyev had found the symphony excellent in parts but less impressive overall. While he admired the first movement, he also considered it overlong. This, he thought, gave the work as a whole the feeling of a symphonic poem with three additional movements attached to justify it being called a symphony. Rubinstein had liked the finale best. Tchaikovsky replied defensively to Taneyev but was appreciative of his candor. He also suspected—rightly, it turned out—that Taneyev was hiding the news of a lukewarm reception to the premiere. At its St. Petersburg premiere the following November, the symphony was better received.

Reaction to the premiere in the United States was also negative. In 1890 a reviewer for the New York Post wrote, "The Fourth Tchaikovsky Symphony proved to be one of the most thoroughly Russian, i.e. semi-barbaric, compositions ever heard in the city. ... If Tchaikovsky had called his symphony 'A Sleigh Ride Through Siberia' no one would have found this title inappropriate."

The British premiere was in June 1893, conducted by the composer, who was attending Cambridge University to receive an honorary doctorate, along with Camille Saint-Saëns, Max Bruch and Arrigo Boito (Edvard Grieg was also honoured, but was unable to attend in person). The hall was filled to capacity, and the symphony received great applause after each movement.

A reviewer in Germany in 1897 wrote "The composer's twaddle disturbed my mood. The confusion in brass and the abuse of the kettledrums drove me away!"

In spite of its early critical reviews, the symphony has become a staple of the orchestral repertoire and remains one of the most frequently performed symphonies of the late 19th century.

== Recordings ==
At least 200 commercial recordings exist of this symphony, including:

- Wilhelm Furtwängler conducting the Vienna Philharmonic Orchestra
- Leonard Bernstein conducting the New York Philharmonic Orchestra (three times—1958 and 1975 CBS/Sony and 1989 live DG)
- Sir John Barbirolli conducting the Halle Orchestra
- George Szell conducting the London Symphony Orchestra
- Igor Markevitch conducting the London Symphony Orchestra (recorded Wembley Town Hall, 19–21 October 1963; Philips)
- Yevgeny Mravinsky conducting the Leningrad Philharmonic Orchestra
- Eugene Ormandy conducting the Philadelphia Orchestra
- William Steinberg conducting the Pittsburgh Symphony Orchestra
- Gennady Rozhdestvensky conducting the USSR Ministry of Culture Symphony Orchestra
- Willem Mengelberg conducting the Amsterdam Concertgebouw Orchestra
- Daniel Barenboim conducting the New York Philharmonic and later the Chicago Symphony Orchestra
- Sir Neville Marriner conducting the Academy of St. Martin in the Fields
- Herbert von Karajan conducting the Berlin Philharmonic Orchestra (three times—1966 and 1976 DG and 1972 EMI Classics), and the Vienna Philharmonic Orchestra (1984, DG)
- Sergiu Celibidache conducting the Munich Philharmonic Orchestra
- Mariss Jansons conducting the Oslo Philharmonic Orchestra
- Zubin Mehta conducting the Los Angeles Philharmonic Orchestra
- Valery Gergiev conducting the Vienna Philharmonic Orchestra
- Lorin Maazel conducting the Cleveland Orchestra
- Pierre Monteux conducting the Boston Symphony Orchestra (recorded Boston 29 January 1959; RCA Victor)
- Claudio Abbado conducting the Chicago Symphony Orchestra
- Riccardo Muti conducting the Philharmonia Orchestra
- Vladimir Ashkenazy conducting the Philharmonia Orchestra
- Michael Tilson Thomas conducting the San Francisco Symphony
- Daniele Gatti conducting the Royal Philharmonic Orchestra
- Vladimir Jurowski conducting the London Philharmonic Orchestra (recorded Royal Festival Hall, 19 March 2011)
- Leonard Slatkin conducting the Detroit Symphony Orchestra
- Georg Solti conducting the Chicago Symphony Orchestra
- Antal Doráti conducting the London Symphony Orchestra and later the National Symphony Orchestra
- Mstislav Rostropovich conducting the London Philharmonic Orchestra (1977, EMI)

== In popular culture ==
- The opening fanfare is used in the introduction to the BBC TV series Ivanhoe 1970
- A very brief part (1–2 seconds) of the last movement of Symphony No. 4 can be heard in the opening of Pink Floyd's song, "Wish You Were Here" (1975), taken from the album of the same name. It was recorded from a radio broadcast via a car radio.
- Symphony No. 4 is used as a soundtrack for Osamu Tezuka's experimental film "Legend of the Forest" (1987). The film was not completed, only the first and fourth movement were finished. In 2014, Tezuka's son Macoto Tezka (Black Jack, Akuemon) premiered Part 2, featuring the music from the second movement, at the 15th Hiroshima International Animation Festival.
- In the movie What a Way to Go! (1964), with Shirley MacLaine and Paul Newman, automatic painting robots strangle Newman as they paint to Tchaikovsky's 4th symphony then explode, killing him.
- In The Melancholy of Haruhi Suzumiya, the episode "The Day of Sagittarius" uses the finale of the Symphony No. 4 in the climax of the dramatic sequence of the SOS Brigade's battle with the Computer Research Society in the game The Day of Sagittarius III.
- The second movement is featured in Star Trek: Voyager episode "Counterpoint", in a scene between Captain Janeway and Devore inspector Kashyk.
- It is featured on the soundtrack of the 2014 film Birdman.

== Cited sources ==
- Figes, Orlando, Natasha's Dance: A Cultural History of Russia (New York: Metropolitan Books, 2002). ISBN 0-8050-5783-8 (hc.).
- Keller, Hans: 'Peter Ilyich Tchaikovsky', in Vol. I of 'The Symphony', ed. Robert Simpson (Harmondsworth, 1966).
- Maes, Francis, tr. Arnold J. Pomerans and Erica Pomerans, A History of Russian Music: From Kamarinskaya to Babi Yar (Berkeley, Los Angeles and London: University of California Press, 2002). ISBN 0-520-21815-9.
- Letter of Madame Nadeshda von Meck, paraphrased from The Symphonies of Brahms and Tschaikowsky in Score (New York: Bonanza Books, 1935). ISBN n/a.
- Slominsky, Nicolas, The Lexicon of Musical Invective. (Seattle: University of Washington Press, 1965). ISBN 0-295-78579-9
- Steinberg, Michael, The Symphony (Oxford and New York: Oxford University Press, 1995). ISBN 0-19-506177-2.
- Warrack, John, Tchaikovsky Symphonies and Concertos (Seattle: University of Washington Press, 1969). Library of Congress Catalog Card No. 78-105437.
- Warrack, John, Tchaikovsky (New York: Charles Scribner's Sons, 1973). SBN 684-13558-2.
