= P.P. Rider =

1983 Japanese film by Shinji Sōmai

- Film poster

Japanese name
- Kanji: ションベン・ライダー
Transcriptions
- Revised Hepburn: Shonben Raidâ
- Directed by: Shinji Sōmai
- Screenplay by: Takuya Nishioka; Chieko Schrader
- Story by: Leonard Schrader
- Starring: Tatsuya Fuji; Michiko Kawai; Masatoshi Nagase; Shinobu Sakagami
- Cinematography: Masaki Tamura; Akihiro Itô
- Edited by: Akira Suzuki
- Music by: Katsu Hoshi
- Production company: Kitty Films
- Distributed by: Toho
- Release date: February 11, 1983 (Japan)
- Running time: 118 minutes
- Country: Japan
- Language: Japanese

P.P. Rider (Japanese: ションベン・ライダー, Hepburn: Shonben Raidâ) is a 1983 Japanese teen yakuza film directed by Shinji Sōmai. The film centers on three adolescents in search of their kidnapped classmate.

== Cast ==
- Tatsuya Fuji as Gonbei, a yakuza member past his prime
- Michiko Kawai as Bruce, the tomboyish female member of the adolescent trio
- Masatoshi Nagase as JoJo, an assertive member of the trio
- Shinobu Sakagami as Jisho, the more reserved of the three youths
- Hideko Hara as Arare, a schoolteacher
- Yoshikazu Suzuki as Nobunaga Deguchi, a kidnapped classmate of Bruce, JoJo, and Jisho
- Masatō Ibu as Tanaka, a policeman
- Ryo Kinomoto as Masa
- Masahiro Kuwana as Yama
- Ichirô Zaitsu as the Shimada gang leader
- Hiroaki Murakami as Kinta, a Shimada gang member
- Mitsuko Baisho as an associate of the Shimada gang
- Casey Takamine as a moneylender
- Takehiko Maeda as Nobunaga's dad

== Production ==
P.P. Rider was produced by Kitty Films with whom Sōmai had previously collaborated on 1980's Tonda Couple. Sōmai's final cut of the P.P. Rider was four hours long; he had to cut the runtime in half as the film was intended to run as part of a double feature.

== Release ==
=== Theatrical ===
The film was released in Japan by Toho on February 11, 1983, as a double feature with Urusei Yatsura: Only You.

=== 2K restoration ===
In 2023 P.P. Rider was restored for distribution in the United States by the Cinema Guild, who collaborated with Japan Society to present the film as part of Rites of Passage: The Films of Shinji Somai, the first North American retrospective on Shinji Sōmai. The restoration was subsequently screened at Yale and then at the IFC Center in Manhattan on September 8, 2023, alongside a new 4K restoration of Typhoon Club, another film by Sōmai which previously had the world premiere of its restoration as part of Japan Society's program.
