= Legend of the Forest =

1987 animated movie by Osamu Tezuka

森の伝説 (Mori no densetsu)
- Genre: Animated film, experimental film
- Anime film

Legend of the Forest – Part 1
- Directed by: Osamu Tezuka; Takashi Ui
- Music by: Pyotr Ilyich Tchaikovsky
- Studio: Tezuka Productions
- Licensed by: Tezuka Productions
- Released: 1988
- Runtime: 29 minutes
- Anime film

Legend of the Forest – Part 2
- Directed by: Makoto Tezuka
- Produced by: Sumio Udagawa
- Music by: Pyotr Ilyich Tchaikovsky
- Studio: Tezuka Productions
- Licensed by: Tezuka Productions
- Released: 2014
- Runtime: 11 minutes

Legend of the Forest (森の伝説, Mori no densetsu) is a 1987 Japanese animated film by Osamu Tezuka and his studio, Tezuka Productions.

Initially planned in four movements, the film was presented incompletely in 1988, on the occasion of the Asahi Prize ceremony, in the form of a first part comprising the first and fourth movements. The two central segments remained unfinished after Tezuka's death in 1989. Makoto Tezuka, the director's son and part-manager of Tezuka Productions, produced the second movement in 2014 under the title The Legend of the Forest – Part 2.

The anime's first movement depicts the struggle between a flying squirrel and a hunter lumberjack. The second, directed by Makoto Tezuka, depicts the love story of two dragonflies as they follow the course of a river through the forest. The third movement, which was never realized, was intended to feature falling raindrops. The fourth and final movement features forest spirits trying to save their environment from the ravages caused by foresters.

The film is entirely silent, and each segment is designed to be synchronized with the music of the various movements of Pyotr Ilyich Tchaikovsky's Symphony No. 4. Inspired by the world of Walt Disney, the film is also a tribute to the history of animated cinema, and an artistic pamphlet with an ecological position.

== Synopsis ==
=== Conversation between the trees of the forest ===
The film opens with a flight over a large forest. Birds flee, frightened by a lumberjack cutting down a tree with a chainsaw. A flying squirrel scurries into one of the cavities in the trunk, which turns out to be the nest where its mate has just given birth. The father carries his children one by one up another tree, but one of them escapes him and disappears below. With no time for despair, he continues to carry his progeny to safety.

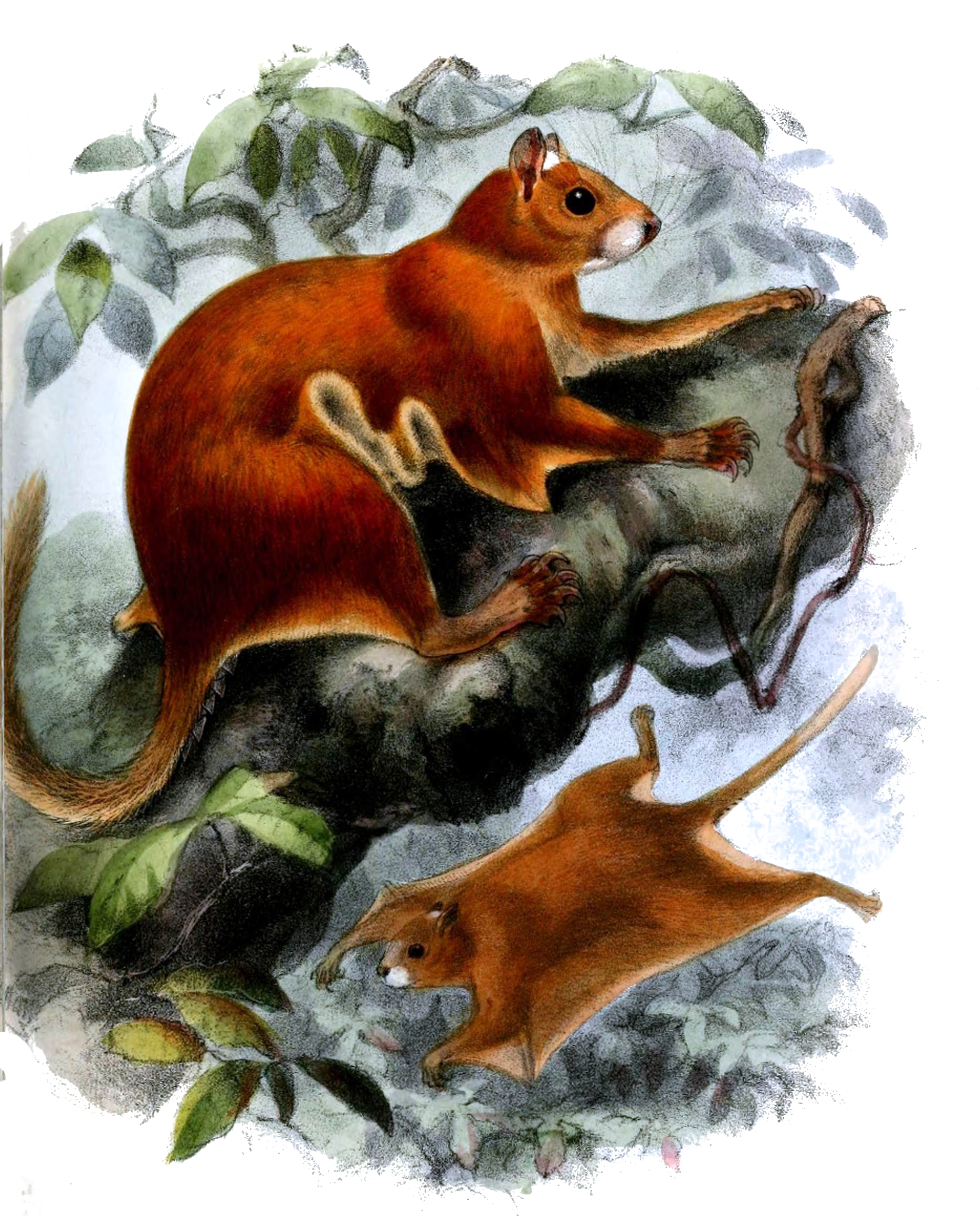
The main character in the first act is a flying squirrel.

An imposing tree with a human face, however, has received the newborn on one of its leaves. The tree causes water to fall, enabling the newborn to survive. Curious animals emerge from their hiding places. The child begins to grow, cradled and nourished by the tree. Now able to move about, the young squirrel sets off on an adventure, fascinated by the birds' ability to move through the air. Mocked by the other animals, he falls trying to imitate them, but realizes that the skin on his arms enables him to glide. The birds, however, seize him with their beaks and pull him in all directions. The squirrel rebels and begins to chase away his tormentors, using his claws and teeth. To get back at his scapegoats, he plucks them, scatters them and throws eggs at them. However, the arrival of the woodcutter puts an end to his fury, and he hides under some roots to avoid being seen. Once the woodcutter has disappeared, a pheasant, followed by her children, shows him the trees cut down by the forester.

Seeing this, the squirrel gets angry and goes to his wooden hut. He sees the woodcutter through the window, feeding voraciously, and discovers the chainsaw leaning against a wall. Moving discreetly, he spills a jar of black, viscous material on the tool, putting it out of action. The forester, who has noticed the sabotage, goes berserk and sweeps a shelf to reach the squirrel, which makes funny faces at him, but misses and gets covered in paint, creating a clownish make-up. He then grabs a shotgun and rushes outside, chasing the animal that has flown out of the window. He manages to catch it, but just as he's about to fire, resin drips from a tree branch and blinds the hunter, allowing the rodent to reach shelter. To satisfy his anger, the hunter kills the pheasant and shoots the saving branch.

Collapsing, the squirrel emerges from his hiding place, but the other animals, holding him responsible for the bird's death, ignore him, turn hostile, and a bird drops feces on his head. The rodent isolates himself on the lightning rod of a stone house. He then sees a female squirrel with mauve fur gliding towards him, who explains that it's dangerous to stay on the antenna, as lightning could strike and electrocute him. Appalled, he joins her on the roof, and is stunned by her beauty. This is the start of a seductive ballet in which the female finally gives him a kiss, but the hunter observes the scene, and the lovers, noticing his presence, flee in separate directions. Finally emerging from his shelter, the male has only time to see his enemy flee with the body of his mate, and falls into tears.

When night falls, the lumberjack resumes his work, causing the forest animals to flee. Mad with rage, the squirrel spots the murderer's tent and breaks in to steal a fork. Climbing back onto one of the tallest branches of a gigantic tree, he stabs the fork into it, and is struck by lightning. Seeing the tree burst into flames, the forester takes fright and runs to take refuge in his tent, but the branch breaks off and falls on the tent, setting it on fire.

=== Romance between two dragonflies ===
Directed by Makoto Tezuka and Tezuka Productions Studios in 2014, the second movement is a cinematic poem following "the evolutionary stages of a river, from its birth in the mountains to the moment it flows into the sea", through the love story of two dragonflies.

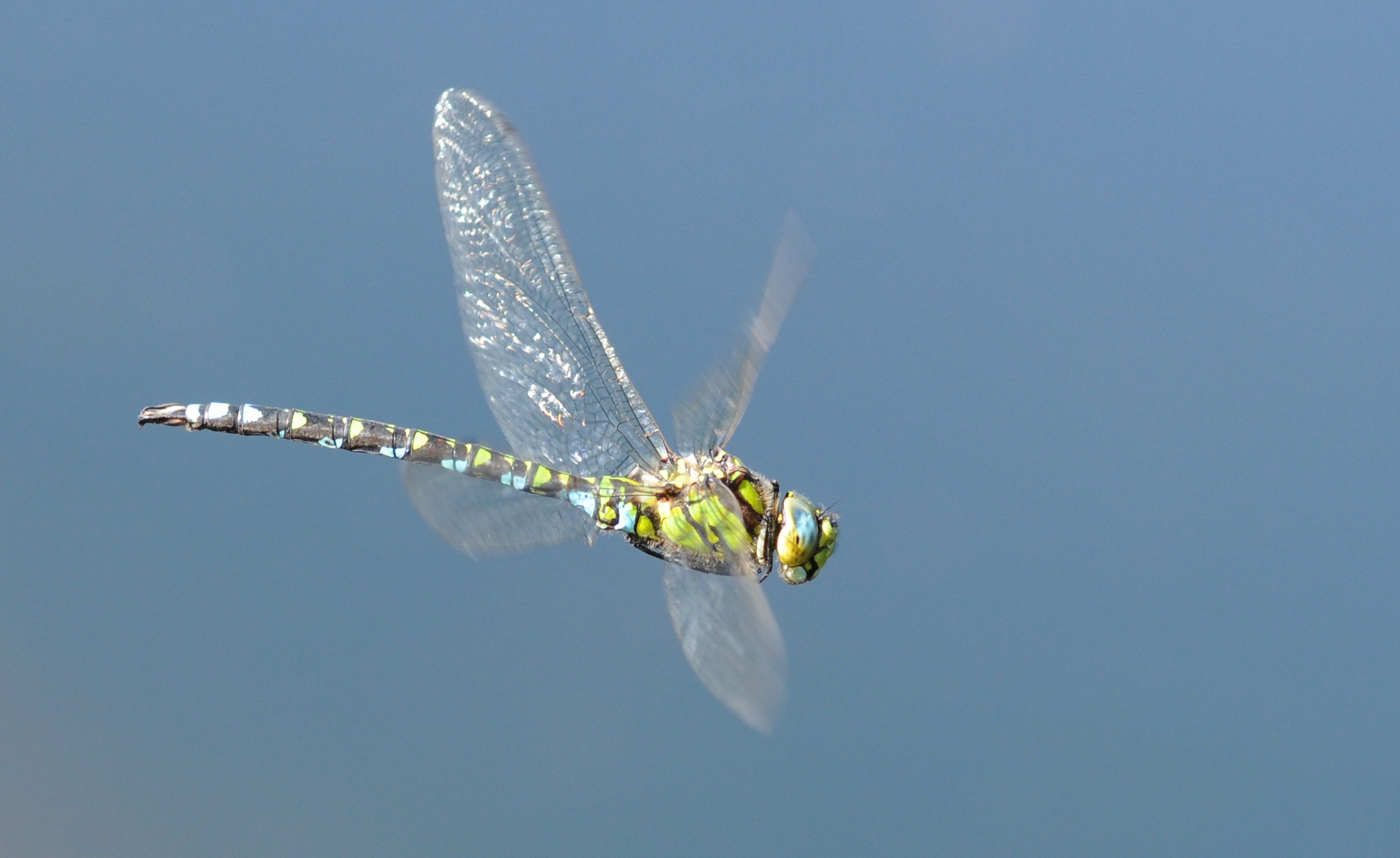
Dragonfly in flight.

An anthropomorphic dragonfly is caught in the center of a spider's web. Another dragonfly spots it and makes several unsuccessful attempts to free it. As a spider approaches, the rescuer flies off and loosens a branch, which strikes the web and knocks both predator and prey off their feet. The dragonfly bounces off a mushroom and lands on a leaf, which breaks off and falls into the river. Carried away by the current, the frightened dragonfly is then followed by a frog which tries to swallow it but is disturbed by the appearance of one of its fellow dragonflies. The second dragonfly, which had been following the improvised raft all this time, finally joins it at the bottom of a small waterfall. The pair come across fish swimming upstream, laying their eggs at the bottom. An otter appears and, attracted by the eggs, throws a stone into the river, sending the leaf and its two passengers spinning. A snake bites her leg as she tries to grab it. The leaf is carried off into the sunset.

The moon has risen, and many glow-worms are flying around a mill. The two dragonflies pass beneath the building's wheel without difficulty. The female performs an aerial ballet, but when the male tries to join her, he notices that one of his wings is torn. He pushes his mate away, then returns and kisses him.

The morning dawns. The leaf is carried away again, the two dragonflies lying side by side.

=== Ballad of the raindrops ===
The script for the third part, which remained unfinished following Tezuka's death in 1989, was nevertheless written by the mangaka, who also referred to it as early as 1981. It's an uneventful episode depicting raindrops falling.

=== On the hill of storm and rainbow ===
The final act opens with excavators and backhoe loaders in action. Fairies fly at full speed, others ride little fish that leap out of the water, while insects are blown by the wind and eggs fall from their nests. Mushrooms run in all directions, kitsunes leap out of thickets only to be caught in the steel jaws of machines. Trees are felled by an army of lumberjacks equipped with chainsaws, and pillars are erected to transport the logs by cable, under the direction of a site manager caricatured as Adolf Hitler.

Deep in the forest, will-o'-the-wisps, bats and rabbits join the magical beings and animals gathered in a clearing. A dwarf resembling a garden gnome emerging from an ent is immediately attacked by disgruntled and threatening animals, who pretend to rip human-shaped mannequins to shreds. A fairy tries to calm their warring ardor by bringing in a flowerpot containing a rosebush, which she gives to a human-shaped tree to explain that a peaceful outcome is still possible, but reactions are mixed. An elf transforms one of the mannequins into a donkey, suggesting that the same should be done with all the foresters, but the donkeys protest energetically, embarrassing the young magician. A witch offers to give them an apple, but maggots emerging from fruits hanging in the trees protest. Trees, ghosts and fauns argue, but trees fall in the middle of the assembly and the workers invade the forest, causing its inhabitants to flee and their environment to become desertified.

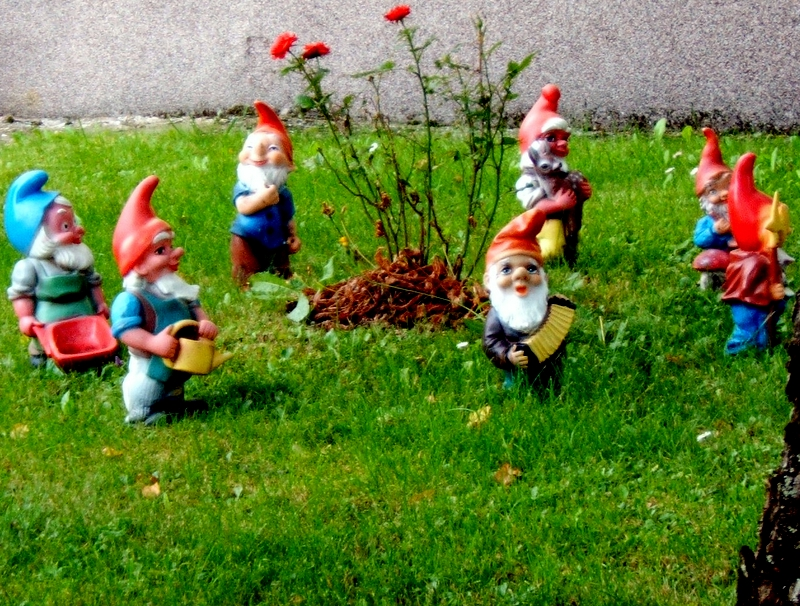
Seven dwarfs try to reason with the contractor who is destroying the forest by offering him a rose.

Seven dwarves make their way through the woods, lighting their way with fireflies contained in bell-shaped flowers. They carry the potted rose to the men's camp, but at the sight of the desolation before their eyes, they become frightened and lose their balance, tumbling down the hill they were standing on. The pot escaped them, but they managed to recover it. They cross an expanse of tree stumps until they arrive in front of a brightly lit building resembling a menacing face. Surrounded by the ominous silhouettes of bulldozers, the dwarves await the appearance of the site manager, to whom they offer the flower. They explain to him that it's better to plant than to cut plants, to spread love and allow life to flourish. But when a dove transformed into a fairy places a kiss on his mouth, the construction foreman, returning in fury, spits flames, throws the pot to the ground and tramples on its contents, as the seven ambassadors look on in horror. An excavator's head comes down, reducing them to dust. Questioning at first, the site foreman lights a cigar with a satisfied air and heads back to the barracks.

Glitter rises from the silhouettes of the crushed dwarfs, and the wind carries away their dust. The heads of the backhoe loaders droop, and the site plunges back into darkness. However, the pile of earth where the rose rests quivers, and a sprout rises from it, growing at prodigious speed, surrounding the iron staircases, insinuating itself into the ventilation ducts, toppling the books and, surrounding the foreman in his bed, encircling him and sinking into his throat. Now as tall as a tree, the plant rips up the transmission towers, pushes the handles of the diggers, knocking them down, and knocks over stored tools. Flowers grow along some vines, while others catch fleeing workers and strangle them. Roots pierce the floor of the building, knocking over shelves and ripping out the construction-village sign. Flowers bloom everywhere and moss covers the mechanical equipment.

== Technical sheet ==
- Title: Legend of the Forest
- Original title: 森の伝説 (Mori no densetsu)
- Music: Symphony No. 4 by Pyotr Ilyich Tchaikovsky
  - Performed by the Tokyo Symphony Orchestra conducted by Ken'ichirō Kobayashi

=== First part ===
==== Technical information ====
- Directed by: Osamu Tezuka, Takashi Ui
- Screenplay: Osamu Tezuka
- Art director: Masami Saito
- Sound director: Takashi Ui
- Duration: Duration: 19 minutes (1st movement), 10 minutes (4th movement)
- Release dates:
  - Japan: February 13, 1988 (Asahi Prize) / 2003 (remastered, IMAX release)
  - France: November 27, 2002
  - Italy: January 15, 2003 (Future Film Festival)
  - United States: February 21, 2015

==== Technical staff ====
- Set design: Setsuko Ishizu, Kazushige Takato, Mieko Chijinami
- Drawing: Masaki Yoshimura, Junji Kobayashi, Shinji Seya, Toshi Noma, Teruo Handa, Yoshiaki Kawajiri, Yoshinori Kanamori, Shinichi Suzuki
- Animation: Naoko Kitamura, Takashi Okamura, Atsushi Ishiguro
- Illustrations: Masaki Katori
- Verification: Kano Kaoru
- Color design: Rika Fujita
- Special effects: Takashi Maekawa
- First assistant operator: Masaaki Fujita
- Sound effects: Shizuo Kurahashi
- Editing: Harutoshi Ogata
- Producer: Takayuki Matsutani
- Assistant producer: Minoru Kubota

=== Second part ===
==== Technical information ====
- Screenplay: Osamu Tezuka
- Directed by Makoto Tezuka
- Duration: 11 minutes
- Release dates:
  - Japan: August 21, 2014 (Hiroshima International Animation Festival)
  - United States: February 21, 2015 (Japan Society, New York City)

==== Technical staff ====
- Planning: Takayuki Matsutani, Yoshihiro Shimizu
- Producer: Sumio Udagawa
- Character design / animation director: Akio Sugino
- Art and design / Art director: Jirō Kōno
- Storyboard: Makoto Tezuka
- Original image: Akio Sugino, Miura Nana, Yamada Momoko, Takashi Shinohara, Masateru Yoshimura, Junji Kobayashi, Miyuki Katayama

== Production ==
=== Origin ===
The project for The Legend of the Forest dates back to 1971, when Osamu Tezuka wanted to make an ambitious animated film to rival Disney Studios. The first movement was inspired by the story Musa the Flying Squirrel (モモンガのムサ, Momonga no musa) published by Tezuka in the magazine Weekly Shōnen Jump on November 22, 1971. (Note: This story was published in France by Delcourt/Akata in the 3rd volume of Histoires pour tous (Stories for everyone).)

The four segments, Conversation between the Trees of the Forest (森の木の対話, Mori no ki no taiwa), Romance between Two Dragonflies (二ひきのかげろうの恋物語, Nihiki no kagerō no koimonogatari), Ballad of the Raindrops ((雨のしずくのバラード, Ame no suzuku no barādo) and On the Hill of Storm and Rainbow ((嵐と虹の丘にて, Arashi to niji no oka nite), are to be synchronized with the four movements of Pyotr Ilyich Tchaikovsky's Symphony No. 4, in the style of the Silly Symphonies or Fantasia. Tezuka had already tried this in 1966 with one of his earlier experimental animated films, Pictures at an Exhibition, which takes Modest Mussorgsky's eponymous music as its soundtrack.

However, the financial difficulties of the Mushi Production studio, which went bankrupt in 1973, prevented the project from going ahead, even though the outline had already been drawn up. Tezuka completed the script in the early 1980s, but it was several years before the film was actually produced by his other studio, Tezuka Productions. Nevertheless, as the director's health worsened, it was decided to screen the unfinished work at the Asahi Prize ceremony on February 13, 1988, with only the first and fourth movements completed by December 18, 1987.

=== Posterity ===
In 2008, Osamu Tezuka's son Makoto Tezuka, one of the directors of Tezuka Productions studio, announced at the 12th Hiroshima International Animation Festival his desire to produce the second and third movements, written by his father but not realized, to complete the film. Makoto Tezuka used mainly the production notes left by Osamu Tezuka, and sought a more Japanese style of animation than the other segments.

After six years in the making, with an interruption due to the 2011 Tōhoku earthquake, the second part, corresponding to the second movement of Tchaikovsky's symphony, was completed and premiered on August 21, 2014, at the 15th Hiroshima Festival, twenty-five years after Tezuka's death in 1989, twenty-seven years after the first broadcast of the unfinished work and thirty years after the mangaka won the festival's first Grand Prize for the Broken Down Film in 1985. The segment is shown among other Tezuka short films at Yokohama's Brillia Short Shorts Theater from September 5-14, 2014. Both parts also received their U.S. premiere at the Japan Society in New York City on February 21, 2015.

== Distribution ==
=== Japanese and international distribution ===
The first and fourth movements of Legend of the Forest were broadcast for the first time at the Asahi Prize ceremony, under the title Legend of the Forest – Part 1, on February 13, 1988.

In 2003, the film was remastered and re-released on IMAX screens in Japan. The same year, on January 15, it was shown in Italy as part of the Future Film Festival.

In 2007, several of Tezuka's animated films, including Legend of the Forest, were made available for legal download on the American iTunes site. The same titles are available on Yahoo!'s streaming platform in Japan.

In 2009, American publisher The Right Stuf released a DVD, The Astonishing Work of Tezuka Osamu, featuring most of Osamu Tezuka's experimental shorts. The work is also licensed by Madman Entertainment in Australia.

=== French distribution ===
The original film was released in France on November 27, 2002, along with four other experimental animated shorts from Mushi Production and Tezuka Productions studios: Mermaid, Drop, the Broken Down Film and Jumping. Despite a discreet release in six cinemas for a total of 7,378 tickets, this selection received a glowing reception from critics, confirming the patrimonial importance of Tezuka's work. Chronic'art's Elizabeth François notes, for example, that "years after Tezuka's death in 1989, his films have lost none of their relevance or superbness, consecrating the still unrivalled talent of one of comics' most glorious heroes". Télérama's François Gorin underlines the "breathtaking mastery with which the old master glides from one graphic style to another".

In 2005, Les Films du Paradoxe released the DVD "8 films by Osamu Tezuka", bringing together the five short films screened as well as Tales of a Street Corner, Pictures at an Exhibition and Self-Portrait.

The first part of the film is a regular feature at festivals and retrospectives. It was shown in Paris at the Planète Manga Festival in February 2012 and Mon Premier Festival in November 2012, at the Premier Festival Manga in Le Bourget in November 2013 and at the Institut Lumière in Lyon in May 2014.

== Awards ==
The first part of the film won three awards in 1988: the Ōfuji Noburō of the Mainichi Film Awards, the Children's Jury Award in the "short film" category at the Bourg-en-Bresse Youth Film Festival, and the CIFEJ (Note: Centre International du Film pour l'Enfance et la Jeunesse (International Film Center for Children and Young People)) Award at Animafest Zagreb.

== Analysis ==
=== Disney influence ===
Osamu Tezuka, a great admirer of Walt Disney, said that The Legend of the Forest is a tribute to his Silly Symphonies series. The two men reportedly met at the 1964 New York World's Fair and Tezuka drew inspiration from Disney's style on numerous occasions in his earlier works, particularly in his animal drawings. The features of the flying squirrel in the first part evoke those of Chip and Dale, the chipmunks created in 1943, while the seven dwarfs in the fourth part recall the characters in Snow White and the Seven Dwarfs, made in 1937.

=== A tribute to animation history ===
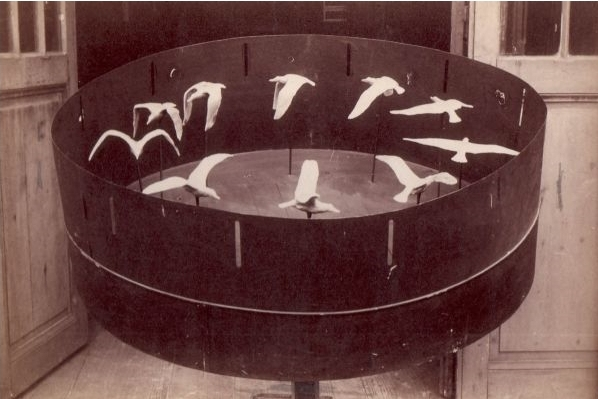
An 1887 zoetrope featuring seagull figures in relief.

The first movement pays tribute to the history of animated film and its techniques. A number of traditional and modern animation processes are used in succession, in a generally chronological order:

- The movement rendered by stop motion, created by editing alone.
- The use of a zoetrope to create movement, filmed from above, evoking a phenakistiscope, and then through one of the openings.
- Minimalist animation, with white outlines on a black background, then black on a white background.
- Use of 3D.
- The transition to color, when the pheasant dies, and then to the modern animation typical of Disney and contemporary Japanese anime.

The fourth movement, meanwhile, blends several traditional limited animation techniques inspired by the UPA and Hanna-Barbera animation studios, with angular lines and bright colors reminiscent of Disney's Fantasia.

Samuel Blumenfeld of Le Monde describes the first movement as reminiscent of Émile Cohl's style, based on a succession of still shots energized by montage, while the fourth movement reproduces the style of Disney's golden age, from the Silly Symphonies to Dumbo and Bambi. Ursula K. Heise identifies several animation styles throughout the work: Walt Disney of course, Émile Cohl, Winsor McCay, Max Fleischer and Dave Fleischer.

Tezuka would employ other techniques in the two central segments: the second was to be made in the style of Disney, using the multiplane system in the image of Snow White and the Seven Dwarfs, Pinocchio, Fantasia and Bambi, while the third was to be a tribute to Norman McLaren's experimental animation, using drawing on negative.

For these stylistic and plastic effects, the work is often presented as experimental, although some critics prefer to consider it a Film d'auteur, as opposed to Tezuka's commercial productions.

=== An environmental and artistic pamphlet ===
Environmental protection is one of Tezuka's most cherished causes. Nature's struggle against the ravages wrought by man is a recurring theme in his work, notably in King Leo and in his various auteur films, and is at the root of the interest in nature and ecology that has played a major role in the filmography of many anime directors, such as Hayao Miyazaki. The Legend of the Forest is considered by Les Inrockuptibles as a "pantheist-ecologist anthem stigmatizing the destruction of the forest". The madness of deforestation is underlined by the figure of the chief contractor, caricaturized as Adolf Hitler.

Fantoche in Émile Cohl's Fantasmagorie.

This demonstration of artistic virtuosity is also a critique of modern animation techniques. With his many references to the history of animation, Tezuka condemns the poor quality of many of the animated productions of the time. Paradoxically, the man who, with his studio Mushi Production, had contributed to the development of limited animation techniques to reduce the production costs of their anime justified these influences in a director's statement published in 1987:

The ravages wrought by recent limited animation technologies (standard with only 6 to 12 frames per second) are unbearable for me. This Disney-centric film is a parody of the evolution of animation techniques from their origins to the present day. The first part will evoke the dynamic expression of painting, the style of Émile Cohl in the spirit of Fantoche, the Silly Symphonies, the techniques used to bring Gertie the dinosaur to life, and the beginnings of the Fleischer brothers and color animation.

== Bibliography ==
=== General publications ===
- Cotte, Olivier (2001). Il était une fois le dessin animé (in French). Dreamland. p. 344. ISBN 978-2-910027-77-3.
- McCarthy, Helen (2009). Osamu Tezuka: Le dieu du manga (in French). Translated by Jennequin, Jean-Paul. Paris: Eyrolles. ISBN 978-2-212-12726-3.
- Osamu Tezuka: Le maître japonais de l'animation (PDF) (in French). Translated by Dhiver, Valérie. Les films du Paradoxe. 2005. p. 22. Archived from the original (PDF) on 2015-09-24. booklet for the DVD 8 films by Osamu Tezuka
- Denis, Sébastien (2011). Le Cinéma d'animation (in French) (2 ed.). Paris: Armand Colin. p. 280. ISBN 978-2-200-27156-5.

=== Columns and articles ===
- Blumenfeld, Samuel (November 27, 2002). "Symphonie écologiste pour deux écureuils et autres espèces en danger". Le Monde (in French) (17990): 36. ISSN 0395-2037.
- François, Elysabeth (November 24, 2002). "Chronique: La Légende de la forêt". Chronic'art (in French).
- Gorin, François (November 27, 2002). "La Légende de la forêt d'Osamu Tezuka" (PDF). Télérama (in French) (2759): 54. ISSN 0040-2699. Archived from the original (PDF) on 2014-10-28.
- Lorrain, François-Guillaume (November 29, 2002). "La Légende de la forêt". Le Point (in French).
- Ostria, Vincent (November 27, 2002). "Par ici les sorties – La Légende de la forêt, de Osamu Tezuka". L'Humanité (in French). Archived from the original on October 30, 2014.
- Ostria, Vincent (January 1, 2002). "Films à l'affiche – La Légende de la forêt". Les Inrockuptibles (in French).
