= Yuji Kato (disambiguation) =

Yuji Kato is the name of:

- Yuji Kato (screenwriter) (born 1957), Japanese screenwriter
- Yuji Kato (born 1978), Japanese retired judoka
