= Shigeaki Saegusa =

Japanese composer (born 1942)

- 三枝 成彰 (三枝 成章)
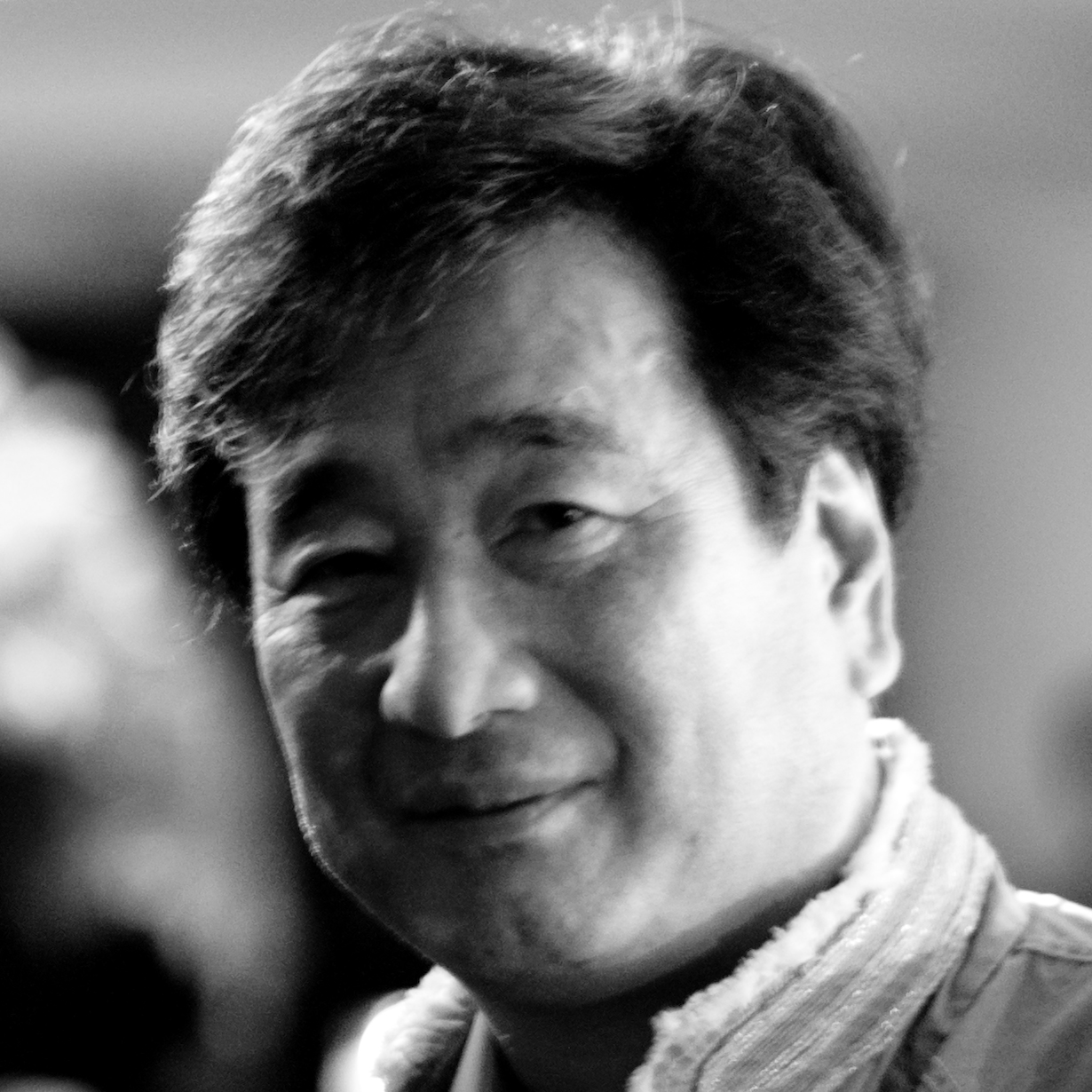
- Born: July 8, 1942 (age 84); Tokyo
- Occupation: composer
- Website: www.saegusa-s.co.jp

Shigeaki Saegusa (三枝 成彰, formerly 三枝 成章; Saegusa Shigeaki; born July 8, 1942) is a Japanese composer.

== Career ==
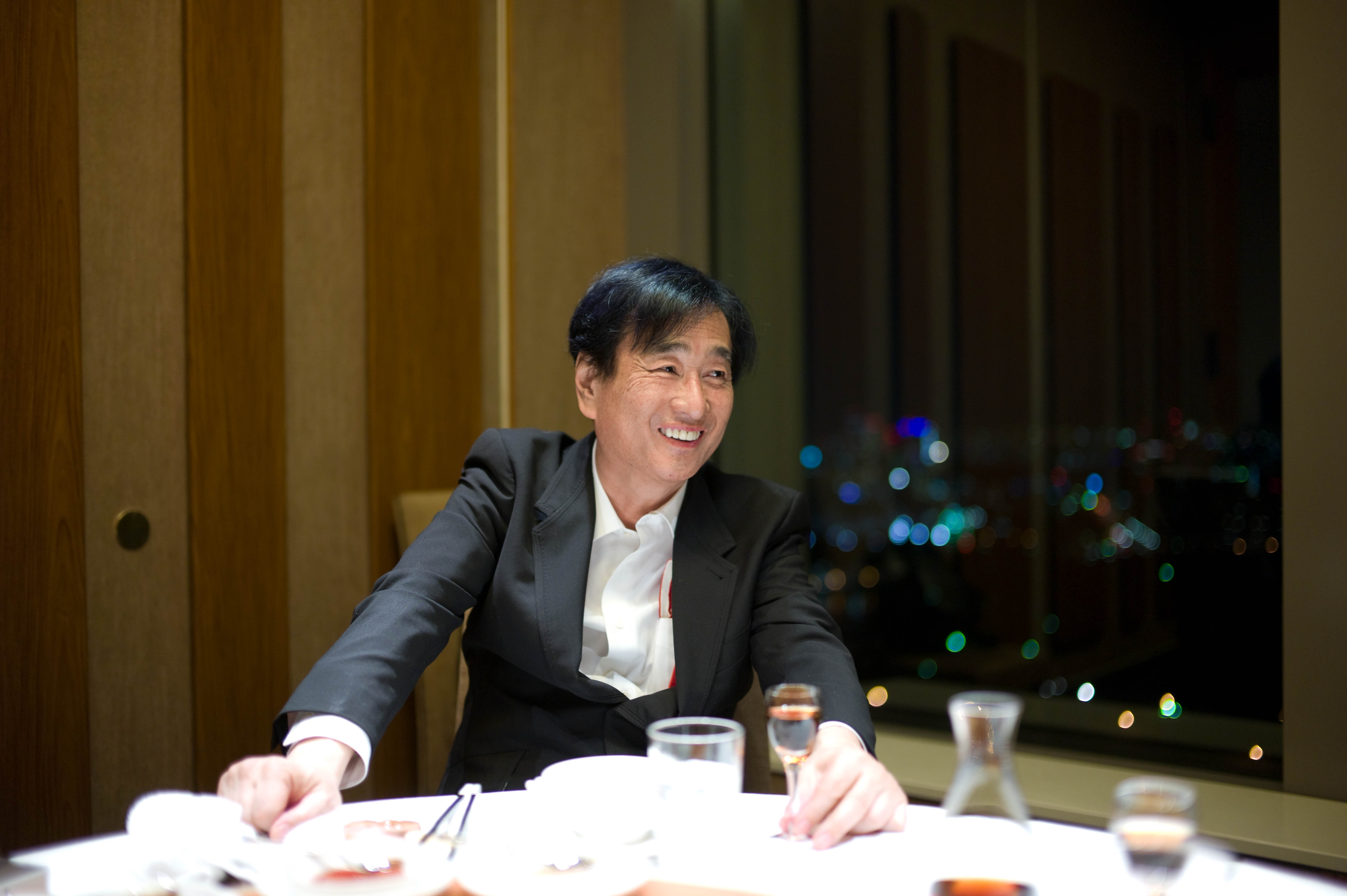
Shigeaki Saegusa (January 24, 2010)

Saegusa is best known for Chushingura, his opera version of the well-known kabuki epic of the Forty-seven Ronin/Chūshingura with a libretto by the novelist Shimada Masahiko. Written over a period of 10 years, the opera was most recently performed at the New National Theatre, Tokyo in 2002. His newest opera, Jr. Butterfly is a sequel to Giacomo Puccini's Madama Butterfly.

He has also written the background music for anime, the foremost of which being Mobile Suit Zeta Gundam. Other anime he has written for are Astro Boy (1980), Mobile Suit Gundam ZZ, Mobile Suit Gundam: Char's Counterattack, Catnapped! The Movie, and Mother: Saigo no Shoujo Eve.

== Works ==
=== Opera ===
- 1997 Chushingura
- 2004 Jr. Butterfly

=== Oratorio ===
- 1989 Yamato Takeru

=== Orchestral works ===
- 1971 Piano Concerto
- 1983 The Symphony
- 1985 Symfonic Suite Z Gundam
- 1989 Orchestra '89

=== Chamber/Instrumental works ===
- 1963 Bläserquintet (Wind Quintet)
- 1965 Novelette for string quartet
- 1977 Memory for narrator, string quartet and tape
- 1981 Radiation Mass for 4 synthesizers, vocorder and percussion
- 1983 Sho '83 for sho, percussion and keyboard
- 1987 Duo '87 for sangen and koto
- 1988 Cello '88 for cello solo
- 1988 Percussion '88 for percussion solo
- 1994 Four Concertos for violin, cello, piano and sangen

=== Vocal works ===
- 1970 Madrigal for 6 sopranos
- 1998 Requiem for soprano, tenor, mixed chorus and orchestra
- 2003 Requiem for soprano, tenor, male chorus and orchestra

=== Film score ===
- 1983 The Catch
- 1985 Typhoon Club
- 1988 Mobile Suit Gundam: Char's Counterattack
- 1988 Oracion
- 1993 Moving
- 1995 Catnapped!

=== Music for TV programs ===
- 1980 Astro Boy
- 1982 Ninjiman Ippei
- 1985 Mobile Suit Zeta Gundam
- 1986 Mobile Suit Gundam ZZ
- 1991 Taiheiki
- 1994 Hana no Ran

== Recordings ==
Chushingura was recorded in 1997 and published on compact disc (Sony Classical SK60233).

== Honours ==
- Medal with Purple Ribbon (2007)
- Order of the Rising Sun, 4th Class, Gold Rays with Rosette (2017)
- Person of Cultural Merit (2020)
