= The Legend of the Stardust Brothers =

Japanese musical comedy film

- Blu-ray reissue cover
- Directed by: Makoto Tezuka
- Written by: Makoto Tezuka
- Produced by: Katsunori Haruda; Takashige Ichise
- Starring: Shingo Kubota; Kan Takagi; Kiyohiko Ozaki; Kyôko Togawa
- Cinematography: Eiichi Ôsawa
- Music by: Haruo Chicada
- Release date: 15 June 1985 (Japan)
- Running time: 100 minutes
- Country: Japan
- Language: Japanese

The Legend of the Stardust Brothers (星くず兄弟の伝説, Hoshikuzu kyôdai no densetsu), is a 1985 Japanese musical comedy film written, edited, and directed by Makoto Tezuka. It is based upon original music written by Haruo Chicada.

== Plot ==
Following their performances, rival musicians, punk rocker Kan of London Boots, and new-wave artist Shingo of Super Cars are scouted by Atomic music producer Minami, who offers a large sum of money to sign them. He states that he can make them both stars within a week, however, they must perform as a duo. Despite not being able to stand each other, they accept the offer, ditching both their bands, as they are transformed into the synth-pop duo, Stardust Brothers. They find themselves quickly rise to stardom, soon having a number one song on the charts, as well as commercial success. Alongside them, Marimo, their number one fan and president of their fan club, also dreams of becoming an idol but finds difficulty due to the sexist entertainment industry.

At the height of their stardom, the duo starts becoming more reckless and hedonistic, causing concern to the company as they wish to promote artists with cleaner images to the public. When Shingo doesn't turn up to a performance on time, Marimo performs a song in order to entertain the crowd, to their delight. Her song ends up being a big hit with the audience, and she too finds herself rising to stardom, although not contractually tied to the company as she is a woman.

Minami is later approached and offered a large sum of money to promote another artist, Kaoru, the son of an influential politician. Soon, Kan and Shingo find themselves losing their fame, and are fired from the company, eventually leading to their downfall. Kaoru sets his sights on Marimo, as he plans to create a scandal between them in order to get the public talking, thus heighten his fame. Kan and Shingo both decide to continue performing, aiming to gain fame without anybody's influence, and Marimo agrees to join them. Kaoru and his goons chase them down, which eventually leads to the death of Minami, shot by Kaoru.

Back to the present day, Kan and Shingo are still performing as the Stardust Brothers, but have fallen far from fame, as they perform to an uninterested crowd. They then are shot and die, causing the crowd to applaud for the first time all night.

== Cast ==
Actor	Role
Shingo Kubota	Shingo
Kan Takagi	Kan
Kiyohiko Ozaki	Atomic Minami
Kyôko Togawa	Marimo
Issay	Kaoru
Mie Akatsuka; Miwako Fukushima; Hiroko Hasegawa; Kaoruko Igarashi; Junko Minami; Miwa Okuno	Chorus dancers
Haruo Chikada; Eiichi Takagi	Ruined musicians
Mokoto Arai	Presenter
Koichi Ekura; Masaki Kato; Hidetoshi Shiroiwa	London Boots
Evelyn	Shingo's lover
Tohru Hasegawa	A beautiful man
Tamio Kageyama; Ramo Nakajima; Hiroshi Shimizu; Fumiko Takada	Atomic Gang
Jin Homma; Shinichi Ikeda; Masahisa Kitao; Hiroshi Nakagawa; Kazuo Takahashi; Shuhei Wakisaka	Atomic Dancers
Masatō Ibu	Mystery Man (voice)
Ikoshin; Toshiro Izumi; Koji Kadota; Kiyoshi Kurosawa; Keiko Kusunoki; Masamichi Mitama; Keiichi Ota; Kuriko Oyama	Salon Uonome visitors
Mitsutosi Ishigami	Salon Uonome host
Megumi Imai	Kinako
Eriko Ito; Shigeo Miyata; Yuji Oki	Supercars
Leo Morimoto	Man of shopping bag
Megumi Imai	Kinako
Takami Morioka; Tachiro Yamamoto	Stunts
Hiroshi Kanetsu	Kin-chan
Fumichika Kato	CF Client
Toru Kawasaki	CF Director
Akira Maeda	Pro-wrestler (UWF)
Noboru Mitani	Sone
Keisuke Miyake; Shigeru Ogino	TV Director
Sunplaza Nakano; Takeshi Sasaki	Guards
Shinji Nagashima; Monkey Punch; Yosuke Takahashi	Visitors at a gay bar
Hiroshi Takano	Secret service
Tamori	Chairman of “Waratte Iitomo”
Jun Togawa	Beautiful woman of Stardust Car
Kazuhiro Watanabe	Kiyose
Ayuko Yamagishi	Akebi
Michi Yamamura	Chairman of "Hyokin Best Ten"
Aiko Yokoyama	Mifuku
Genki Yoshimura	
Senkichi Ōmura	Nakazumi

== Musical numbers ==
All songs featured within the film are written and composed by Haruo Chicada.

1. "The Stardust Brothers" - Kan Takagi, Shingo Kubota
2. "You Don't Like (No) London Boots" - Kan Takagi
3. "Around Akasaka" - Shingo Kubota
4. "Songs in the Hearts of Young People" - Kiyohiko Ozaki
5. "Strong Enemy Atomic" - Kan Takagi, Shingo Kubota
6. "Monitor" - Chuji Akagi
7. "Ballad of Past Years" - Shingo Kubota
8. "Yellow Sun" - Shingo Kubota
9. "Marimo's Feelings" - Kyôko Togawa
10. "A Man Who Wants To Get Married" - Shingo Kubota
11. "Peace Mark Baby" - Issay
12. "Gasoline Rain" - Kan Takagi, Shingo Kubota
13. "Automatic" - Kan Takagi
14. "Crazy Game" - Chuji Akagi
15. "Real Star" - Kiyohiko Ozaki

== Production ==
The film is based on the 1980 concept album The Legend of the Stardust Brothers by musician Haruo Chicada. Chicada was inspired by the films Phantom of the Paradise and The Rocky Horror Picture Show, and conceived of the album as the soundtrack for a non-existent musical film. Tezuka, with Chicada as producer, adapted the album into a film based upon the already written songs, as well as three new tracks based upon characters that Tezuka wrote. Tezuka cast his friends, musicians Shingo Kubota and Kan Takagi, to play the lead roles.

The film was shot on Super 16mm, and blown up to 35mm for editing. The animated sequence was created by horror manga artist, Yōsuke Takahashi.

Jun Togawa, avant-garde pop singer and sister of Kyôko Togawa, makes a brief cameo as "Beautiful woman of Stardust car".

== Release ==
Due to the film's poor reception, the film was largely forgotten about, and the original 16mm negative was lost. The film was redistributed by a company, Third Window Films, and was also entered into 30 worldwide film festivals, which helped revitalise the film, as well as gaining an international cult following.

After amassing a cult following in recent years a sequel called The Brand New Legend of the Stardust Brothers was released in 2016 and directed by Makoto Tezuka.

On May 25, 2021, a North American home release of this film was licensed by kaju film distributor SRS Cinema, which includes special features including the making-of interview and the original trailer. Except for the DVD and streaming, the release was also available in limited quantities on VHS (number of 25) and Blu-ray (number of 1000 copies).
