= Moving (1993 film) =

1993 film

- DVD cover
- Directed by: Shinji Sōmai
- Written by: Satoshi Okonogi; Satoko Okudera; Hiko Tanaka
- Produced by: Hirohisa Mukuju
- Starring: Kiichi Nakai; Junko Sakurada; Tsurube Shōfukutei
- Cinematography: Toyomichi Kurita
- Edited by: Yoshiyuki Okuhara
- Music by: Shigeaki Saegusa
- Release date: 20 March 1993 (Japan)
- Running time: 124 minutes
- Country: Japan
- Language: Japanese

Moving (Japanese: お引越し, Hepburn: Ohikkoshi) is a 1993 Japanese drama film directed by Shinji Sōmai. It was screened in the Un Certain Regard section at the 1993 Cannes Film Festival.

The film follows Ren, a young girl who struggles with her parents' looming separation.

Initially appreciated by Japanese critics only, it has now gained popularity overseas thanks to a critically acclaimed 2023 restoration and 2024 theatrical and streaming re-release. It is considered to be one of Shinji Sōmai's best works.

== Plot ==
Ren is an 11-year-old girl whose parents are about to divorce. Her mother Nazuna is an upfront woman who yearns for freedom from her family obligations, while Ken'ichi is an affectionate father and office worker; both frequently tend to neglect their daughter and have a troubled relationship with alcohol. Ken'ichi's brother and his wife, Yukio and Wakako, occasionally help the problematic couple.

After Ken'ichi finally completes the move to his new apartment, Nazuna takes Ren out to eat and lets herself go. The day after, trying to appease her daughter's wish for normalcy, she drafts multiple pacts stating how the daily chores are to be divided between the two. These pacts are mostly ignored due to Nazuna's carelessness.

One evening, Ren discovers a divorce paper that her mother has yet to turn in, causing her to become somewhat distraught and prompting a chain of unfortunate events; Ren tries to run away but is cornered by her extended family, the attempt culminating in a fight between Nazuna and Ken'ichi, and she gets in trouble at school after hitting a classmate during an argument with a girl whose parents are also separated. She eventually makes up and hangs out with both of them, but the troubles continue as she keeps on misbehaving and causing accidents, such as setting the school lab on fire.

After goading her parents to attend the August fireworks by Lake Biwa, Ren runs away again, and ends up spending the rest of the day with an elderly couple who take her to the festival. While Ken'ichi is watching the fireworks on the road from a hill, tempted to drink from his flask, Nazuna finally manages to find her in the crowd after crossing a packed bridge. But just as Ren might reconcile with her mother, she instead decides to go towards the mainland, where festival goers are burning effigies by lifting and lighting hay bales on fire.

By the morning hours the festival is over and Ren is deep in the woods. She wanders by a river, howls at the moon and slides through the fallen leaves. Tired and stumbling, she eventually makes her way back to the festival grounds, where she reaches a bed of flowers by a weak fire. Renko briefly lays in fetal position until a mysterious feeling prompts her to get up again.

In a dream-like sequence, Ren wades through the lake as she encounters doppelgängers of her and her family, who are towing a ceremonial boat with the help of some young men from the festival. A fire then breaks out on the boat, distressing Ren's double and causing Ren's parents to go silent. The men disappear and Ren's parents dive underwater as the boats multiply and start catching fire. Her doppelgänger come to her and hugs her, taking her place and going forth in the water to continuously shout, "Congratulations!".

As she comes back to the riverbank to warm up by the fire, an unusually cheerful Nazuna arrives from behind. They later take the train home, during which Ren finally hands back the crumpled divorce certificate to her mother. The events of the holiday at Lake Biwa eventually become the topic of her essay for school, which she reads in front of the class; she ends it by saying her parents have a new contract.

Ren leaves her class to rejoice with the cast on the street in front of the school. She greets Wakako's family and newborn, gives her mother a flower and puts down her father's glass of wine. Seeing Ren rush to the street, a woman asks here where she's going, to which Ren answers: "the future".

== Cast ==
- Kiichi Nakai
- Junko Sakurada
- Tsurube Shōfukutei
- Mariko Sudo
- Tomoko Tabata as Renko
- Taro Tanaka
