= Yuji Kato (screenwriter) =

Japanese screenwriter

Yuji Kato (加藤 祐司, Katō Yūji, born July 30, 1957) is a Japanese screenwriter.

== Career ==
Yuji Kato was from Sendai city in Miyagi prefecture.

- 1983: Awarded a second prize for his screenplay "Typhoon Club (film) (台風クラブ)" in the Directors Company's Scenario Competition, a film production company.
- 1984: Graduated from the Department of Art Studies, Faculty of Art and Design at Tokyo University of the Arts. Entered the MFA program at Tokyo University of the Arts. In the same year, decided to make a film of "Typhoon Club (film) (台風クラブ)" and met with director Shinji Sōmai (相米慎二, Sōmai Shinji). Began filming of the movie. accompanied the film crew to the site, assisted with filming, and added dialogue as requested by Director Sōmai.
- 1985: Debuted as a screenwriter'. Won the Best Screenplay Award in the Staff Division of the 40th Mainichi Film Awards for the film "Typhoon Club (film) (台風クラブ)". "Typhoon Club (film) (台風クラブ)" won the Japanese Film Excellence Award in the Production Division at the same awards. And the Grand Prix in the Young Cinema category at the 1st Tokyo International Film Festival. In the same year, the film "Typhoon Club (film) (台風クラブ)" was released to the public.

== Personal life ==
He has been friends with Film Director Jūkōh Tanaka (田中じゅうこう, Tanaka Jūkōh). for more than 20 years and occasionally participates in the talk events that accompany the release of his films.

== Works ==
=== Screenplays ===
- "Typhoon Club (film) (台風クラブ)" (Toho films, 1985 film)
- "Obocchama-niwa-wakarumai! (お坊っチャマにはわかるまい!)" (TBS, 1986 TV drama)
- "Katei-no-mondai (家庭の問題)" (TBS, 1987 TV drama)
- "Yokubarike-no-hitobito (欲ばり家の人々)"(TBS, 1987 TV drama)
- "Bed-de-papa-to-yobanaide (ベッドでパパと呼ばないで)"(ABC, 1987 TV drama)
- "Kimurake-no-hitobito (木村家の人びと)"(TBS, 1988 TV drama)
- "Y-shi-no-rinjin, Fumie (Y氏の隣人 踏み絵)" on "Gimme a break (ギミア・ぶれいく)" (TBS, 1989 TV entertainment)
- "Tane (たね)" (NHK, 1992 TV drama)
- "A Guru Is Born (教祖誕生)" (Toho films, 1992 film)

=== Planning/Direction ===
- "Akete-gyoten-kura-no-naka 1 (開けて仰天蔵の中1)" and "Akete-gyoten-kura-no-naka 2 (開けて仰天蔵の中2)"on "Tsuiseki (追跡 (情報番組))" (Nippon TV, 1988 information and documentary program)
- "Sarumawashi-no-furusato ~China~ (猿まわしのふるさと〜中国〜)" on "Subarashiki-chikyu-no-tabi (素晴らしき地球の旅)" (NHK／BS II, 1997 travelogue program)
- "Toki-wo-koeta-kessaku (時を超えた傑作)" (Sky PerfecTV! ch.750, 2001 information and documentary program)
