= Future Film Festival =

Animation film festival

The Future Film Festival (FFF) is an international film festival dedicated to animation and special effects, held annually since 1999 in Bologna, Emilia-Romagna.

== History ==
The press center, media accreditation office, round tables, and relaxation area are grouped in the "Future Village", located in the Palazzo Re Enzo on Piazza Nettuno. Giulietta Fara has been the director of the Future Film Festival since 1999.

It's a film festival – open to professionals, enthusiasts, and the simply curious – whose aim is to discover and promote animation and new technologies applied to cinema, particularly among young audiences and artists from different cultures and nations.

The competition features a selection of feature films and a selection of shorts, screened in one or more downtown cinemas. Prizes are awarded for the best use of new digital technologies, and the "Grand Prix Platinium" is awarded to the best film in the competition.

The fourteenth edition occurred from 27 March to 1 April 2012 and The 22rd edition occurred from 21 September to 2 October 2022.

== Palmarès ==
=== Grand Prix Platinium ===
- 2007: One Man Band, Andrew Jimenez (USA);
- 2008: 5 centimeters per Second, Makoto Shinkai (Japan);
- 2009: Fierro, Norman Ruiz and Liliana Romero (Argentina);
- 2010: A town called panic, Stéphane Aubier and Vincent Patar (Belgium);
- 2011: No Longer Human, Morio Asaka (Japan).
- 2012: A Lettre to Momo, Hiroyuki Okiura (Japan).
- 2013: Anima Buenos Aires, María Verónica Ramírez (Argentina).
- 2014: Cheatin', Bill Plympton (USA).
- 2015: Giovanni's, Mizuho Nishikubo (Japan).

== See also ==
- Animation
- Lists of animated films
- List of computer-animated films
