= A Letter to Momo =

- Theatrical release poster

Japanese name
- Kanji: ももへの手紙
Transcriptions
- Revised Hepburn: Momo e no Tegami
- Directed by: Hiroyuki Okiura
- Written by: Hiroyuki Okiura
- Produced by: Arimasa Okada; Keiko Matsushita; Mariko Noguchi; Motoki Mukaichi
- Starring: Karen Miyama; Yūka; Toshiyuki Nishida; Chō; Kōichi Yamadera
- Cinematography: Koji Tanaka
- Edited by: Junichi Uematsu
- Music by: Mina Kubota
- Production company: Production I.G
- Distributed by: Kadokawa Pictures
- Release dates: September 10, 2011 (TIFF); April 21, 2012 (Japan)
- Running time: 120 minutes
- Country: Japan
- Language: Japanese
- Box office: $6.7 million

A Letter to Momo (Japanese: ももへの手紙, Hepburn: Momo e no Tegami) is a 2011 Japanese anime drama film produced by Production I.G and distributed by Kadokawa Pictures. The film was written and directed by Hiroyuki Okiura and stars an ensemble cast featuring Karen Miyama, Yūka, Toshiyuki Nishida, Chō and Kōichi Yamadera. In A Letter to Momo, 11-year-old Momo Miyaura moves with her mother to a small island town after her father dies. When she arrives, she encounters three goblins that others cannot see who help her to cope with the loss of her father and the changes in her life.

A Letter to Momo premiered at the 2011 Toronto International Film Festival in Toronto, Canada on September 10, 2011, and was released on April 21, 2012, in Japan.

== Plot ==
Following the death of her father Kazuo, Momo Miyaura and her mother Ikuko travel from Tokyo to the Seto Inland Sea. Momo carries Kazuo's unfinished letter, which contains only the words "Dear Momo". At her mother's estate in Shio Island (汐島, Shiojima), they meet their relatives Sachio and Sae Sadahama, and Koichi, a postman and an old friend of Ikuko, who has always had a crush on her. Momo is devastated and misses Tokyo. In the attic, she opens a present containing a rare picture book about goblins and Yōkai, collected by Sachio's father. Three droplets from the sky enter Ikuko's estate and transform into yokai consisting of Kawa, Mame, and Iwa, the group's leader.

When Ikuko begins taking nursing classes, Momo reads the book and begins to hear some strange sounds from the house. She is chased out of the estate by the yokai, only to encounter a young boy named Yota. Oblivious to the house's strange noises, Ikuko and Yota assume that it is safe. The next morning, she meets Yota and his sister Umi. The three meet up with his friends and swim under the bridge, but Momo decides not to and runs to a shelter during a thunderstorm. Iwa, Mame and Kawa reveal themselves, having stolen some fruit from around the island. Frightened, Momo runs back to Ikuko's estate and discovers that Sachio's orchard was ransacked. Sachio then tells Momo that the yokai were originally gods, but they were transformed as a punishment for breaking the divine laws.

Momo attempts to prevent the yokai from stealing the local vegetables, but Kawa inadvertently breaks Ikuko's mirror. After a brief argument with Ikuko, a distraught Momo leaves and talks to the yokai about her relationship with Kazuo as well as the events leading up to his fatal boating accident. Later, Ikuko suffers a near-fatal asthma attack while searching for her. Momo, realizing her mistake, desperately asks the yokai to help look for a doctor on the other side of the island. The yokai, however, decline and Momo personally searches for the doctor. As Koichi and Yota pursue Momo, she reveals her previous argument with Kazuo before his death and asks Koichi to help find the doctor. Meanwhile, the yokai realize they can escape punishment by allowing Momo and Koichi to cross over the newly completed bridge and find the doctor.

The next morning, Momo writes a letter to her father thanking him as Ikuko recovers. Having completed their mission to protect Momo, Iwa, Mame and Kawa transform back into the droplets and return to the sky. That night, Momo and Ikuko reconcile during the tōrō nagashi and the two realize that Kazuo wrote that he was proud of her. She begins her new life with Yota and the other children by swimming under the bridge.

== Voice cast ==
Character name	Japanese voice actor	English voice actor
Momo Miyaura (宮浦 もも, Miyaura Momo)	Karen Miyama	Amanda Pace
Ikuko Miyaura (宮浦 いく子, Miyaura Ikuko)	Yūka	Stephanie Sheh
Iwa (イワ)	Toshiyuki Nishida	Fred Tatasciore
Kawa (カワ)	Kōichi Yamadera	Dana Snyder
Mame (マメ)	Chō	Bob Bergen
Kazuo Miyaura (宮浦 カズオ, Miyaura Kazuo)	Daizaburo Arakawa	Kirk Thornton
Sachio Sadahama (貞浜 サチオ, Sadahama Sachio)	Yoshisada Sakaguchi	Frank Ashmore
Sae Sadahama (貞浜 サエ, Sadahama Sae)	Ikuko Tani	Philece Sampler
Kōichi (幸市)	Takeo Ogawa	Rick Zieff
Yōta (陽太)	Kota Fuji	Kanoa Goo
Umi (海美)	Katsuki Hashimoto	Mia Sinclair Jenness

== Production ==
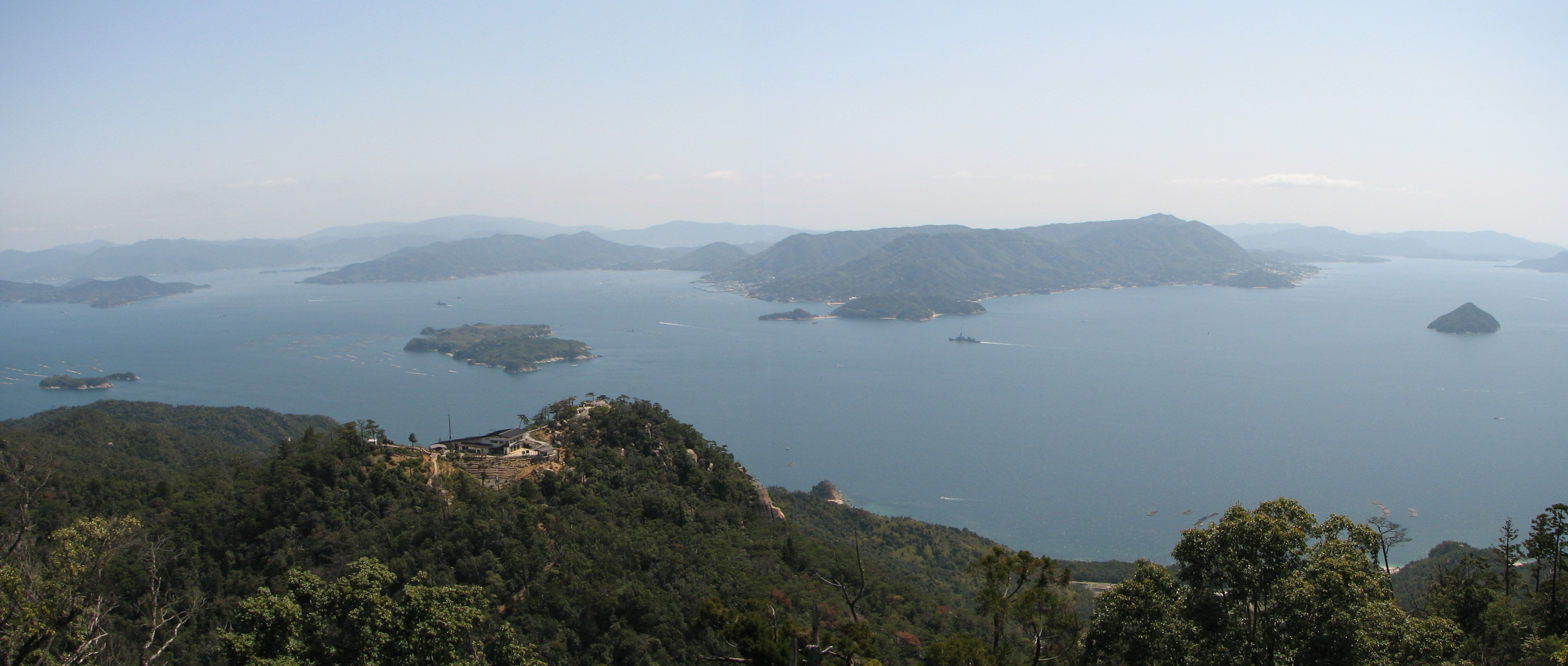
The Seto Inland Sea as shown from Miyajima island. A Letter to Momo used the sea as the film's setting.

=== Development ===
Distributor Kadokawa Pictures announced this film in its lineup of 2011 and 2012 films on 15 February 2011. More details of the film were announced on 11 July 2011. It was announced that the director Hiroyuki Okiura will be in charge of this film. His previous work as a director includes the 2000 film Jin-Roh: The Wolf Brigade. The film A Letter to Momo is Hiroyuki's first film in 11 years after Jin-Roh. He had spent 7 years coming up with the script, directing the film and creating the storyboard for this film.

=== Casting ===
The main voice cast members of A Letter to Momo was first announced on 17 November 2011. It was announced that actress Karen Miyama voiced the 11 year old lead character Momo, while actress Yūka is voicing Momo's mother. In addition, actor Toshiyuki Nishida voices Iwa in the film.

=== Theme song ===
In an announcement made on 11 July 2011, it was revealed that the theme song for the film A Letter to Momo is the song Uruwashimahoroba ~ Utsukushiki Basho ~ (ウルワシマホロバ～美しき場所～) by Japanese singer Yuko Hara. This song is an acoustic piece, and it creates an image of the rich natural scenery of the Seto Inland Sea. The "美しき場所" in the song title is the old way of describing "a beautiful place to live". Hara wrote the song's lyrics and composed the music, with Junichi Soga as the editor of the song.

Yuko Hara, who is the keyboardist for the Japanese band Southern All Stars, reportedly spent 5 years working on this piece of music. She said that "I loved animation from a very young age, so being able to contribute the theme song for this film makes me happy and honored.".

== Release ==
=== Film festivals ===
A Letter to Momo made its international debut at the 2011 Toronto International Film Festival that took place from 8 to 18 September 2011. It was screened at the festival under its "Kids" programming. Later, it was announced that the film will be shown at the 44th Sitges International Fantastic Film Festival that ran from 6th to 16 October 2011 and at the 16th Busan International Film Festival, which took place on 6th to 14 October. It will be shown in Busan as part of the festival's "Wide Angle" program.

Additionally, A Letter to Momo was screened at the 27th Warsaw International Film Festival. This is the first Japanese anime film to be showcased at the Warsaw International Film Festival and it competed at the festival under its International Competition section. Also, it was announced that this film will be competing for the Halekulani Golden Orchid Award at the 31st Hawaii International Film Festival, which took place from 6 October to 16 October 2011.

A Letter to Momo made its US continental premiere at the New York International Children's Film Festival that took place March 2 to 25, 2012.

It was featured in the Boston International Children's Film Festival, which ran from August 18 to September 1, 2013, at the Museum of Fine Arts, Boston.

GKIDS distributor New Video/Cinedigm released A Letter to Momo on bilingual DVD and Blu-ray in the U.S. on October 21, 2014.

=== Theatrical release ===
A Letter to Momo was released in Japanese cinemas on April 21, 2012, debuting in over 300 theater screens on its opening weekend.

== Reception ==
=== Box office ===
The film grossed $4,969,070 in Japan, $1,700,694 in South Korea, $6,409 in Hong Kong, $1,003 in Belgium, and $71,712 in the United States, for a total of $6,748,712 worldwide.

=== Critical response ===
The review aggregator website Rotten Tomatoes reported an 80% approval rating with an average rating of 6.7/10, based on 30 reviews. The website's consensus reads, "Sweet, sad, and visually striking, A Letter to Momo is a hand-drawn experience for animation fans to savor." On Metacritic, the film achieved an average score of 65 out of 100, based on 11 reviews, signifying "generally favorable reviews".

Mark Schilling of The Japan Times said that Okiura "manages [the film's] transition from light to serious with the craft and assurance of a true storyteller, while firmly grounding his human and nonhuman characters in their Seto Inland Sea setting, from the narrow portside streets to the gloriously expansive view from the island's highest point," and also praised the film's hand-drawn animation. Jeannette Catsoulis of The New York Times also praised the film's look and said, "As Momo conquers her fears, averts a tragedy and finally sees the beauty of her surroundings, the movie grabs your heart with the softest of hands."

=== Accolades ===
Year	Name of Competition	Category	Result	Recipient
2011	27th Warsaw International Film Festival	International Competition	Nominated	A Letter to Momo
2011	31st Hawaii International Film Festival	Halekulani Golden Orchid Award	Nominated	A Letter to Momo
2012	14th Future Film Festival - Italy	Future Film Platinum Grand Prize	Won	A Letter to Momo
2014	41st Annie Awards	Best Animated Feature	Nominated	A Letter to Momo

== Merchandise ==
=== Manga ===
A Letter to Momo was adapted into a film manga and was serialized in the Monthly Asuka magazine, published by Kadokawa Shoten. This manga is written by Akiko Kitami, and the first chapter of the manga was published in the November 2011 issue of the magazine. Kitami's previous works have also previously been serialized in the Monthly Asuka.
