= Shinobu Sakagami =

Japanese actor

- 坂上忍
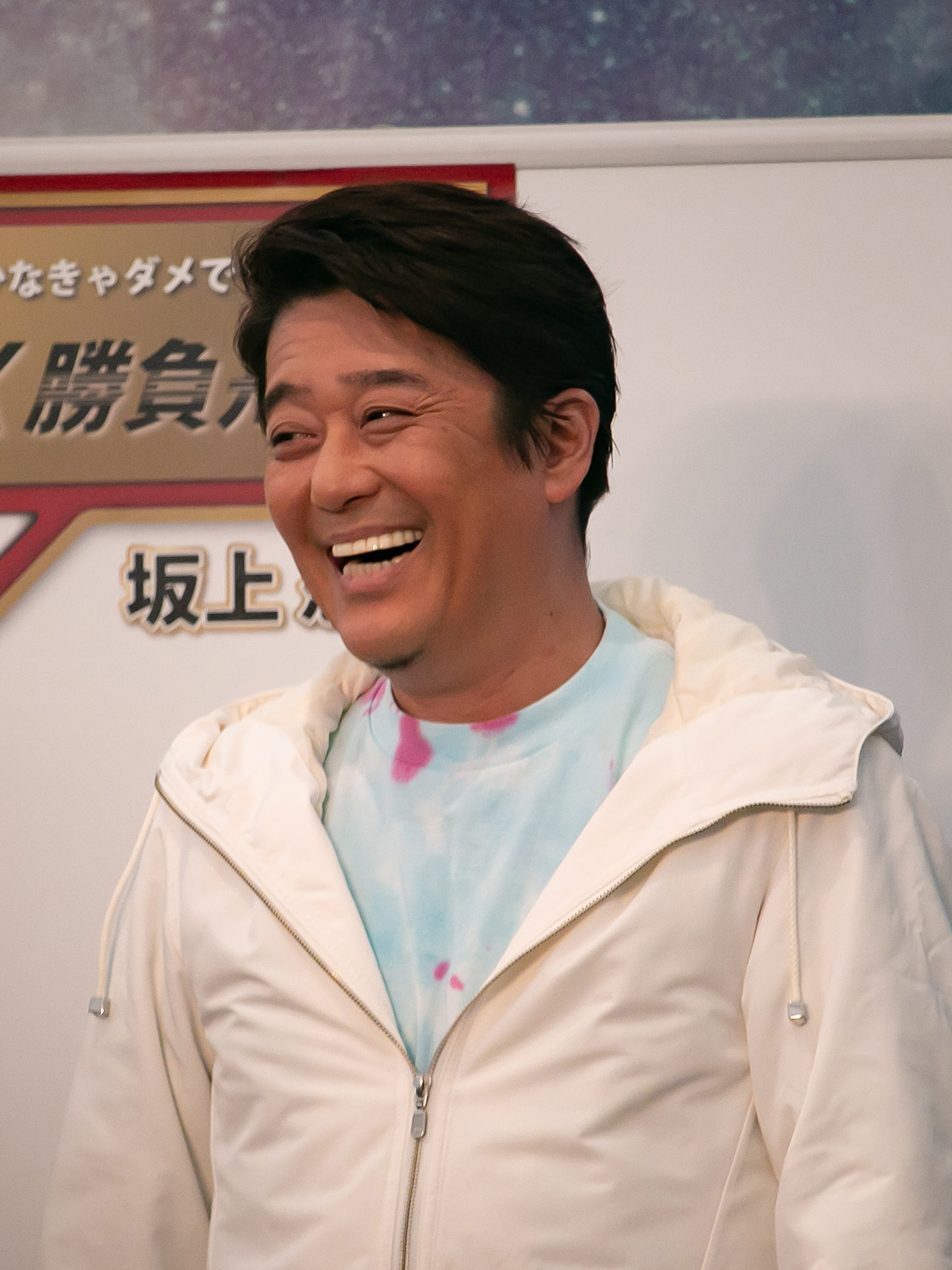
- Born: 1 June 1967 (age 59); Suginami, Tokyo, Japan
- Occupations: Tarento theatre director Film director Television presenter pundit essayist Singer actor
- Years active: 1970–present
- Agent: Avance Production
- Family: Yasushi Sakagami (brother)

Shinobu Sakagami (坂上 忍, Sakagami Shinobu; born 1 June 1967 in Suginami, Tokyo) is a Japanese tarento, essayist, film director, television presenter, singer and actor. Sakagami entered the entertainment industry at the age of 3 as a child actor, marking him one of the longest tenured in the industry for his age.

== Life and career ==
Sakagami was influenced to join the theatre group Gekidan Wakakusa at the age of three due to the death of his grandmother. He was enrolled by his parents in hopes of making friends, but instead flourished in acting and quickly rose to prominence in the industry.

At the age of four, Sakagami starred in several television dramas and variety programs, and was called a "child prodigy" with his natural acting skills. He continued acting as his main career path into his teens, when Sakagami's father went into bankruptcy and accumulating a large sum of debt from his addiction to gambling. Sakagami's parents divorced when he was 15, and he continued his acting career, with most of his earnings sent to pay off the family's debt. Due to his career in the entertainment world, he had difficulties keeping up with studies. Despite successfully enrolling into high school, Sakagami got into a fight on the first day of school and voluntarily expelled himself from school.

Sakagami's acting career came to a bottleneck in his teenage years as he was remembered mainly for his acting as a child. He began activities as a musician but found relatively little success. It was in 1988 that his career turned upwards with his role in the yakuza film Crazy Boys, propelling him into success once again.

In 1995, Sakagami was involved in a car crash into a utility pole when driving under the influence.

In 2012, Sakagami's performance on various variety shows garnered him popularity and success as a tarento. From then on, he became a prevalent figure and television personality in the entertainment industry, with hundreds of program appearances per year. He transitioned as a television presenter and MC, and is a regular on several ongoing variety programs.

== Media ==
=== Television programs ===
==== Current regular programs ====
- Viking (バイキング) (Fuji TV, 2014–present) MC
- Downtown Now (ダウンタウンなう) (Fuji TV, 2015–present)
- Ariyoshi Zemi (有吉ゼミ) (Nippon TV, 2013–present)
- Sakagami Shinobu no Bottleless ni Kanpai (坂上忍のボートレースに乾杯) (JLC, 2016–present)
- Sakagami & Sashihara no Tsuburenai Mise (坂上&指原のつぶれない店) (TBS TV, 2016–present) MC alongside Rino Sashihara
- Chokugeki! Shinsou Sakagami (直撃!シンソウ坂上) (Fuji TV, 2018–present) MC
- Sakagami Animal Kingdom (坂上どうぶつ王国) (Fuji TV, 2018–present) MC
- 1-Ban Dake ga Shitteiru (1番だけが知っている) (TBS TV, 2018–present) MC

==== Current special programs ====
- Beat Takeshi no Ikaganamono-kai (ビートたけしのいかがなもの会) (TV Asahi, 2013–present)
- Geinoujin Desuyo Tabi (芸能人ですよ旅) (Nippon TV, 2014–present) MC
- Sakagami Shinobu no Katasete Agetai TV (坂上忍の勝たせてあげたいTV) (Nippon TV, 2014–present) MC
- Yoroshiku go Kentō Kudasai (ヨロシクご検討ください) (Nippon TV, 2014–present) MC
- Nin 24-Ji (忍24時) (Nippon TV, 2014–present) MC
- Japan Academy Prize (日本アカデミー賞) (Nippon TV, 2016–present) Studio MC
- Ikari no Tsuiseki Busters (怒りの追跡バスターズ) (TBS TV, 2016–present) MC alongside Hiromi
- FNS Bangumi Taikou! All Star Spring-Fall Festival Special (FNS番組対抗!オールスター春秋の祭典スペシャル) (Fuji TV, 2017–present) MC
- Sakagami Shinobu no Pikapika-dan (坂上忍のピカピカ団) (TV Tokyo, 2017–present)
- Betsukao Happyōkai (別顔発表会) (TV Tokyo, 2017–present) MC
- Jitsuroku! Kane no Jikenbo (実録!金の事件簿) (Fuji TV, 2017–present) MC

=== Television dramas ===
- Shitamachi Kaasan (下町かあさん) (Fuji TV, 1972)
- Renzoku Terebi Shōsetsu (連続テレビ小説) (NHK G)

- Aiyori Aoku (藍より青く) (1972)
- Honmamon (ほんまもん) (2001–2002) – as Tabuchi-sensei

- Arigatou (ありがとう) (TBS, 1972, 1973)
- Kizudarake no Tenshi (傷だらけの天使) (Nippon TV, 1974) – as Takeshi
- Zatoichi Monogatari (座頭市物語) (Fuji TV, 1974) – as Tarokichi
- Denshichi Torimonochō (伝七捕物帳) (Nippon TV, 1974) – as Shimataro
- Akai Giwaku (赤い疑惑) (TBS, 1975) – as Akira Isobe
- Mito Kōmon (水戸黄門) (TBS)

- Season 7, Episode 13 (1976) – as Toko
- Season 25, Episode 7 (1997) – as Shinkichi
- Season 38, Episode 15 (2008) – as Toshisuke
- Season 40, Episode 3 (2009) – as Shinpachiro Sugaya

- Ginga TV Shōsetsu – Tonari no Shibafu (銀河テレビ小説 – となりの芝生) (NHK, 1976) – as Taro Takahira
- Kakushimetsuke Sanjou (隠し目付参上) (MBS TV, 1976) – as Kenkichi
- Yabure ga Satōshuu Akuningari (破れ傘刀舟悪人狩り) (TV Asahi, 1976) – as Jinichi
- Yoake no Keiji (夜明けの刑事) (TBS, 1976) – as Tsutomu
- Ōedo Sōsamō (大江戸捜査網) (TV Tokyo, 1977) – as Tsutomu
- Tanpopo (たんぽぽ) (Nippon TV, 1977) – as Takashi Tomura
- Fushigi Ken Tonton (ふしぎ犬トントン) (Fuji TV, 1978 – 1979) Leading role – as Taro
- Kataguruma (かたぐるま) (Nippon TV, 1979) – as Mitsuo Tashiro
- Edo no Kaze Season 4 (江戸の旋風IV) (Fuji TV, 1979) – as Sadahiko Go
- Taiyō wa Shizumazu (太陽は沈まず) (Nippon TV, 1980)
- Kayama Yuzo no Black Jack (加山雄三のブラック・ジャック) (TV Asahi-Shochiku, 1981)
- Taiga drama (大河ドラマ) (NHK)

- Onna Taikoki (おんな太閤記) (1981) – as Sakichi
- Tobu ga Gotoku (翔ぶが如く) (1990) – as Ōyama Iwao

- Kayō Suspense Gekijō (火曜サスペンス劇場) (Nippon TV)

- Mama ni Satsui o (ママに殺意を) (1981)
- Isho o Okutta Onna (遺書を送った女) (1983) – as Eldest son of Keisuke Takazawa
- Morimura Seiichi no Denwama (森村誠一の電話魔) (1990)
- Hakone Yugawara Onsen Kōban 2 (箱根湯河原温泉交番2) (2004) – as Satoru Kobayashi
- Karuizawa Mystery 7 (軽井沢ミステリー7) (2005) – as Kotaro Hirose

=== Films ===
- P.P. Rider (1983)
- Edo Castle Rebellion (1991)
- No Worries on the Recruit Front (1991)

=== Voice acting ===
- The Angry Birds Movie, Red
- The Angry Birds Movie 2, Red
