= Typhoon Club (film) =

- Theatrical release poster

Japanese name
- Kanji: 台風クラブ
Transcriptions
- Revised Hepburn: Taifū kurabu
- Directed by: Shinji Sōmai
- Written by: Yuji Kato
- Produced by: Susumu Miyasaka
- Starring: Yuka Onishi; Tomokazu Miura
- Cinematography: Akihiro Itô
- Edited by: Isao Tomita
- Music by: Shigeaki Saegusa
- Production company: Director's Company
- Distributed by: Toho
- Release date: August 31, 1985 (Japan)
- Running time: 115 minutes
- Country: Japan
- Language: Japanese

Typhoon Club (Japanese: 台風クラブ, Hepburn: Taifū Kurabu) is a 1985 Japanese film directed by Shinji Sōmai. The film is about a group of young kids that get trapped inside their school during a large storm.

== Cast ==
- Yuichi Mikami as Kyoichi Mikami
- Shigeru Benibayashi as Ken Shimizu
- Toshiyuki Matsunaga as Akira Yamada
- Youki Kudoh as Rie Takami
- Tomokazu Miura as Teacher Umemiya
- Yuka Onishi as Michiko Omachi
- Yuriko Fuchizaki as Midori Morisaki
- Toshinori Omi as Kobayashi
- Shingo Tsurumi as Keiji Mikami, Kyoichi's brother
- Minori Terada as Ruzo Shimizu, Ken's father
- Kaori Kobayashi as Junko Yagisawa, Umemiya's girlfriend
- Tomiko Ishii as Katsue Yagisawa, Junko's mother
- Makoto Sato as Hideo Yagisawa, Junko's uncle
- Saburo Date as Okabe, the janitor

== Plot ==
The film follows the lives of a group of middle school classmates in a small town outside of Tokyo. Set over the course of a week, it shows the different backgrounds and dynamics between the students and the teacher while hinting at a forecast of a major typhoon. Their teacher, Umemiya (Miura), has a somewhat close relationship with the rebellious students. Rie and Mikami seem to be in a relationship but it is strained when Mikami reveals that he will be leaving town to study in a high school in Tokyo. Ken, who lives with his alcoholic father, has a crush on Michiko but is cruel to her and burns her back during a science class. Two girls, Yumi and Yasuko, share a secret relationship.

On the day it starts raining, Rie runs away from home to go to the city while a few of the students get locked up inside the campus. She spends the day with Kobayashi, a young man who claims to be a college student, but decides against staying the night with him in order to get home. However, she gets stuck in the city when the storm causes the trains to shut down. Back on campus, Mikami tries to reach out to Rie's parents and Umemiya, but none of the adults seem worried about the teens or offer any help to rescue them from the storm. Previously stressed about his and his peers' situation, Mikami ultimately joins his friends as they find joy in the typhoon-stricken school. Later, meditating on his question about life and death, he asks his friends to witness his death and continue living as he jumps from a classroom window.

Rie returns to town the next day and finds Akira, who tells her the school is closed. They walk together towards the school building across the flooded campus.

== Production ==
Yuka Ohnishi said she actually wore skin-colored underwear in the scene where students are dancing naked in the middle of a typhoon.

== Release ==
The world premiere of a 4K restoration took place at Japan Society on April 27, 2023.

=== Awards and nominations ===
7th Yokohama Film Festival

- Won: Best Director - Shinji Sōmai
- Won: Best Supporting Actor - Tomokazu Miura
- 2nd Best Film

1st Tokyo International Film Festival

- Won: Tokyo Sakura Grand Prix

10th Hochi Film Award

- Won: Best Supporting Actor - Tomokazu Miura

== See also ==
- List of Japanese films of 1985
