= Hiroyuki Okiura =

Japanese anime director (born 1966)

- Born: October 13, 1966 (age 59); Katano, Osaka Prefecture, Japan
- Occupations: Anime director and animator
- Years active: 1982-present
- Spouse: Sumi Mutoh

Hiroyuki Okiura (沖浦啓之, Okiura Hiroyuki; born October 13, 1966) is a Japanese anime director and animator working for Production I.G.

== Career ==
Okiura left high school at the age of 16 and entered the animation industry as a member of the studio Anime R, where he studied under Moriyasu Taniguchi and which Taniguchi superintends. He is known for his detailed effects animation in, for example, the chopper attack scene in Patlabor 2: The Movie, and more recently his highly realistic character animation in works such as the opening credits to Cowboy Bebop: The Movie and several Production I.G features. His debut work as a director, Jin-Roh, completed in 1998, was the recipient of the Minami Toshiko Award at the 11th Yubari International Fantastic Film Festival in February 2000.

Okiura's next written and directed feature film, A Letter to Momo, premiered at the 2011 Toronto International Film Festival, about 11 years after his first film. It was in-development for seven years.

== Personal life ==
He is married to voice actress Sumi Mutoh, who portrayed Kei Amemiya in Jin-Roh.

== Filmography ==
The following are the works of Hiroyuki Okiura:

=== Director ===
Black Magic M-66 (1987, animation director and key animator)
Zillion (1987, animation director, character designer, key animator)
Record of Lodoss War (1990, animation director)
Hashire Melos! (1992, animation director, character designer and storyboard)
Jin-Roh: The Wolf Brigade (1999, director, original character designer and storyboard)
A Letter to Momo (2011, director, screenplay and storyboard)
Japan Animator Expo (2015, Ep. 34, animation director, character designer, screenplay, key animation)

=== Key Animator ===
Miyuki (1983-1994)
Genesis Climber MOSPEADA (1983-1984)
Black Magic M-66 (1987, also animation director)
Akira (1988)
Venus Wars (1989)
Patlabor: The Movie (1989)
Roujin Z (1991)
Catnapped! (1995)
Memories (1995, chief animator and key animator: Magnetic Rose / key animator: Stink Bomb)
Blood: The Last Vampire (2000)
Metropolis (2001)
Cowboy Bebop: The Movie (2001, opening credit sequence director and key animator)
Tennis no Ōjisama – Futari no Samurai (2005)
xxxHolic: A Midsummer Night's Dream (2005)
Naruto the Movie: Legend of the Stone of Gelel (2005)
Paprika (2006)
Evangelion: 3.0 You Can (Not) Redo (2012)
Your Name (2016)
Blade Runner: Black Out 2022 (2017)
Mobile Suit Gundam: The Witch From Mercury (2022)

=== Other ===
Blue Comet SPT Layzner (1985-1986, mechanical animation director)
Patlabor 2: The Movie (1993, assistant animation supervisor)
Ghost in the Shell (1995, character design, animation supervisor and layout artist)
Ghost in the Shell 2: Innocence (2004, character designer and animation supervisor)
