= Typhoon Club =

Children's magazine in Hong Kong

Typhoon Club is a monthly children's magazine published by Cyclone Publishing Ltd in Hong Kong. It was launched in 2002 and is designed to encourage local primary and secondary students to enjoy their reading of English. Much of its content is localised to Hong Kong and Asia, but it includes international content, too. Typhoon Club is used in many classrooms in Hong Kong as an alternative teaching tool. Over 180 issues have been published since its launch and there are over 1,200 features included within the magazine's back catalogue. Typhoon Club became an online magazine in October 2021.

== History ==
The Typhoon Club magazine was established in Hong Kong in October 2002 by Mark Cowley and published by AsiaProMarketing. Cowley's five-year-old son and seven-year-old daughter assisted him shaping the articles in the magazine's inaugural issue. In its first two weeks, 1,000 people had subscribed to the magazine. Published monthly, Typhoon Club is aimed at children between the ages of seven and 14 and students who are generally in the school years Primary Four to Form Two. The magazine's articles are published in Chinese and English.

== Typhoon Club Levelled Reading Programme ==
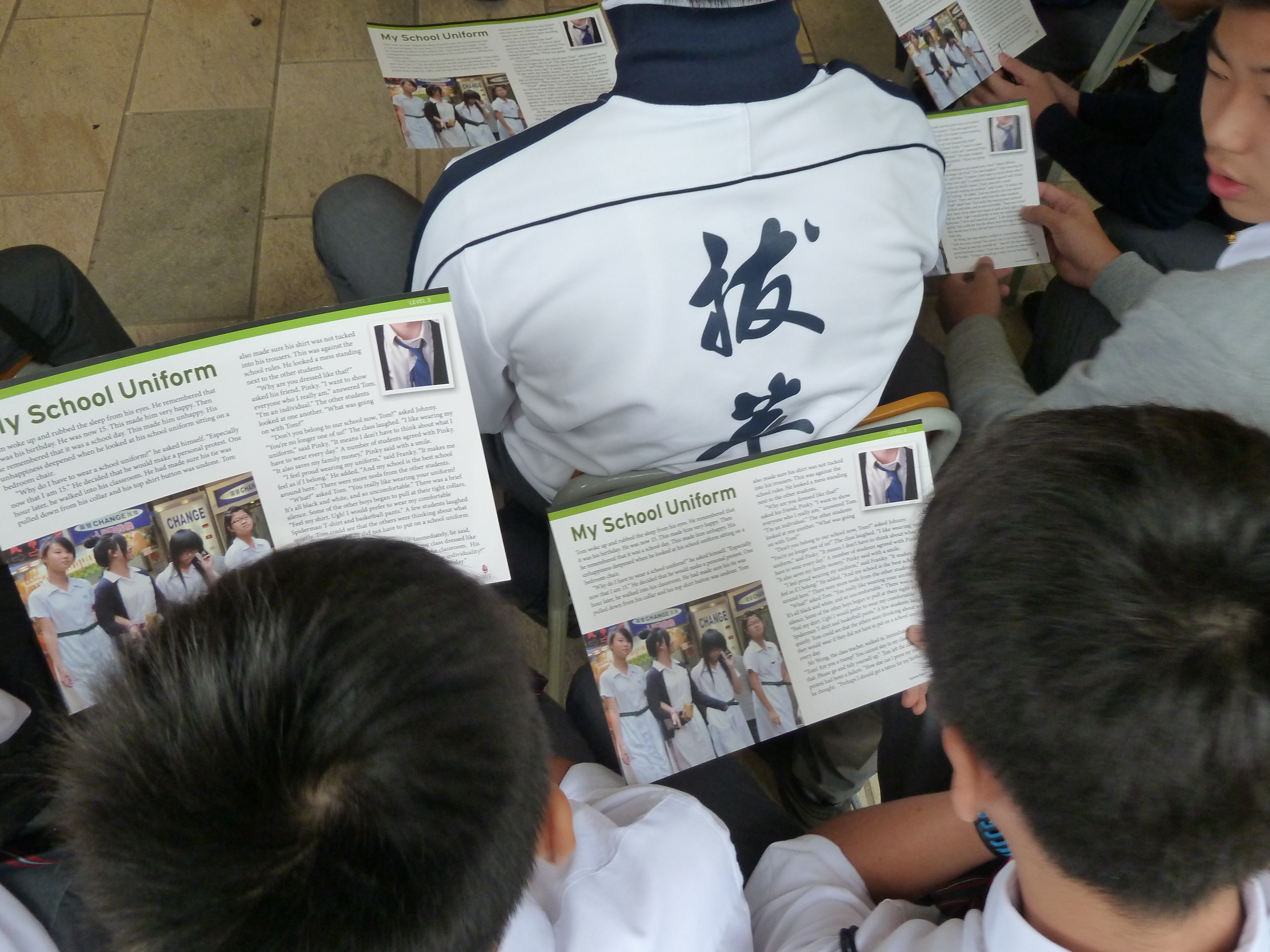
Typhoon Club Levelled Reading Programme

In 2015, Typhoon Club began producing many of its original magazine features as reading cards written at four different levels of difficulty for both primary and secondary levels. The Reading Cards are specifically designed to help accommodate learner diversity within the classroom. The cards have proved to be very popular with both students and teachers and have worked very well at all levels. In 2015 and 2016, Typhoon Club implemented its Levelled Reading Programme at 40 primary and secondary schools with funding from the English Alliance and the Standing Committee on Language Education and Research (SCOLAR). 7,500 students successfully participated in the programme. An additional 40 secondary schools will participate in the Programme in 2017 and 2018. Typhoon Club is now digitalising all its back catalogue of over 1,200 unique features at four different levels or difficulty.

== Typhoon Club Magazine Writing Courses & Summer Courses ==
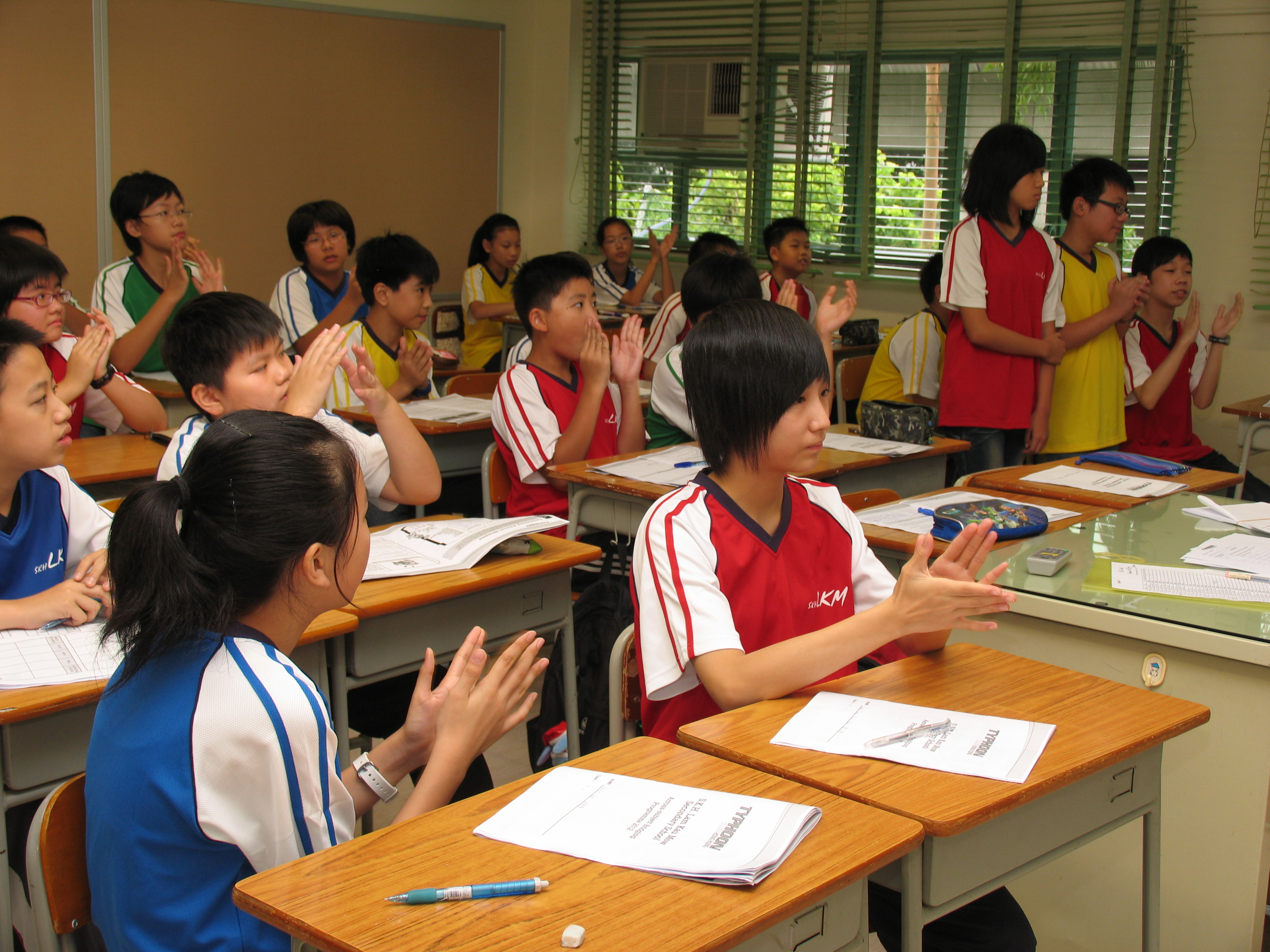
A Typhoon Club Magazine Writing Course lesson

Typhoon Club developed and launched its unique magazine writing course in 2004 to help students of all ages write their own magazine. Teachers are sent into schools to help students write their own magazine features. Each student's writing is then typed, edited and scanned into a professionally produced magazine template. Every student receives their own magazine containing their own writing. The Magazine Writing Courses have been implemented in hundreds of primary and secondary schools throughout Hong Kong with over 45,000 students writing their own magazine under the direction and guidance of Typhoon Club.

Typhoon Club also implements annual summer courses to encourage primary aged students to explore different locations in Hong Kong and to write about their experiences in their own magazine.

== Books ==
Typhoon Club has published two books, both written by Mark Cowley. 'Hello From Me' (2017) tells the story of Hong Kong student, Tim Tang, visiting England for the first time. There, he participates in a variety of different cultural experiences including traditional Morris Dancing in Oxford, cheese chasing at Cooper's Hill, a visit to London's Transport Museum and eating fish and chips on Brighton beach. The sequel, 'Hello From Me, Too' (2019), featured Tim Tang entertaining his English cousin in Hong Kong. Together they compare Hong Kong and English cultures. This includes Hong Kong's fireworks to England's Bonfire Night, a full English breakfast to dim sum, and Hong Kong's Cheung Chau Da Jiu Festival to England's pancake racing on Shrove Tuesday. Audio recordings of both storybooks were provided by opera singer, Christopher Purves. Students from forty local primary and secondary schools have been scheduled to participate in dedicated English reading programmes between 2017 and 2021 with each student receiving a free copy of either book. The Hello From Me programmes have been supported from the Standing Committee on Language Education and Research (SCOLAR).

== Reading & Me With HSBC ==
Typhoon Club has organised regular events for its readers. These have included the 18-month English reading project, Reading & Me with HSBC. Launched by then Chairman of The Hongkong and Shanghai Banking Corporation, David Eldon, 10 children's stories were especially written by Typhoon Club for the project which were then read by senior HSBC executives within one of the bank's branches. Additional readers included David Eldon's successor, Vincent Cheng, and CEOs Michael Smith and Peter Wong. The English reading programme was enjoyed by over 3,500 students and CNBC made a short TV report.
