= Catnapped! =

Totsuzen! Neko no Kuni Banipal Witt
- Directed by: Takashi Nakamura
- Written by: Takashi Nakamura; Chiaki J. Konaka
- Produced by: Tarō Maki; Yoshimi Asari; Hiroaki Inoue
- Starring: Hiroaki Hori; Mirai Sasaki; Fumihiko Tachiki; Noriko Hidaka; Mayumi Iizuka
- Edited by: Takeshi Seyanna
- Music by: Shigeaki Saegusa
- Production company: Triangle Staff
- Distributed by: T&K Telefilm
- Release date: June 10, 1995
- Running time: 76 minutes
- Country: Japan
- Language: Japanese

Totsuzen! Neko no Kuni Banipal Witt (とつぜん！猫の国 バニパルウィット, Totsuzen! Neko no Kuni Baniparu Witto), known outside Japan as Catnapped!, is a 1995 Japanese anime fantasy comedy film, directed, created and written by Takashi Nakamura, who was also its character designer. The animation was produced by Triangle Staff. The theme song of the film was performed by Mayumi Iizuka.

== Plot ==
Toriyasu and his little sister Meeko's pet dog, Papadoll, have been missing for a week. Toriyasu thinks he ran off, but Meeko claims it was an alien abduction. The next night, Toriyasu and Meeko are visited by three feline scientists, Henoji, Suttoboke, and HoiHoi. They take Toriyasu and his sister Meeko on a trip to the cat world of Banipal Witt. Upon arrival, the magical sun of Banipal Witt turns Toriyasu and Meeko into kittens.

The children meet Master Sandada, a powerful wizard who explains that Papadoll has been brought to Banipal Witt and turned into a giant, flying monster by the evil Princess Buburina, who hopes to use Papadoll as a weapon. The princess takes Meeko hostage, and things begin to look grim. Sandada says that only Toriyasu has the power to turn Papadoll back to normal, and it must be done before sunrise, or he and Meeko will suffer the same fate.

Later that night, Buburina tells her prisoners of her plan to create a giant mouse balloon that would be used against anyone who rebels against her. Meeko demands Papadoll's return and calls the princess a witch. Buburina plans to make Meeko her new enslaved person once the sun rises.

Under cover of night, Toriyasu, the three scientists, and other rebels prepare to sneak into the castle to free Papadoll and save Meeko. The plan goes awry when Toriyasu slips on a rope, waking Buburina and setting off alarms all over the castle. Quickly, the rebels regroup in time to see Suttoboke and Meeko release the mouse balloon. A massive air battle ensues. Toriyasu tries to take Papadoll back. Buburina, however, refuses to give back Papadoll and nearly makes Toriyasu fall to his death after Buburina tears Papadoll's collar off. During his fall, Papadoll finally remembers Toriyasu. Quickly, they rescue Meeko and make it home.

The next morning, Toriyasu and Meeko return to a normal life, but when they go to school the next day, the cats beckon them away on urgent business, setting up for a potential sequel.

== Cast ==
The actors are listed original voice actor first, English voice actor second.

- Hiroaki Hori/Dorothy Elias Fahn as Toriyasu: One of the main characters and the main protagonist of the movie. He is the older brother of Meeko.
- Mirai Sasaki/Sandy Fox as Meeko: Toriyasu's little sister, and one of the main characters. She is the first to realize Papadoll's disappearance is by less-than-ordinary causes.
- Noriko Hidaka/Mary Elizabeth McGlynn as Buburina: the main antagonist of the movie. She is a spoiled princess, who believes that everything belongs to her. She is victim of a curse that causes anyone she touches to blow up like a balloon.
- Mayumi Iizuka/Lia Sargent as ChuChu: the little sister of DohDoh.
- Masato Yamanouchi/Tom Wyner as Sandada: An elderly wizard, leader of the resistance against Buburina.
- Ichirō Nagai/Michael Sorich as Henoji: One of three feline scientists sent by Master Sandada to find Toriyasu. He serves as the leader of the little expedition to the human world.
- Jōji Yanami/Simon Prescott as HoiHoi: One of three feline scientists.
- Sukekiyo Kameyama/Michael Forest as Suttoboke: One of three feline scientists. He is the sensible member of the team.
- Fumihiko Tachiki as Papadoll: Toriyasu's dog.
- Mitsuo Iwata/Dougary Grant as DohDoh: The former apprentice of Master Sandada and big brother of ChuChu.

== Staff ==
- Original Creator, Director, Character Designs: Takashi Nakamura
- Screenplay: Takashi Nakamura, Chiaki J. Konaka
- Producers: Tarō Maki, Yoshimi Asari, Hiroaki Inoue
- Art Director: Shinji Kimura
- Music: Shigeaki Saegusa
- Sound Director: Shigeharu Shiba
- Production: Triangle Staff
- Distribution: T&K Telefilm

== Music ==
Catnapped! has published the film's soundtrack by Toshiba EMI on 19 July 1995, around the time of the film's original theatrical release, the soundtrack contains the incidental themes to the movie as well as its end credit's theme song "Yume e No Tobira" as well as another song and a karaoke version of it. None of the other tracks on the soundtrack have, and the CD is incredibly rare (if copies can be found at all), with most sites no longer selling the CD.

=== Track listing ===
1. Opening Theme: Cat Music Box
2. Banipalwit's Theme 1
3. Boring Toriyasu
4. What?! Strange cat
5. Three Cats
6. What happened in the children's room
7. Banipalwit's Theme 2
8. Sleeping Cat
9. Banipalwit's Theme 3
10. Papadoll Attacks 1
11. Papadoll Attacks 2
12. Princess Buburina's Theme 1
13. The Sorcerer's Apprentice
14. Princess Buburina's Theme 2
15. Great Magician 1
16. Lily's Waltz
17. Tightrope Walking
18. Great Magician 2
19. Moon Night Serenade 1
20. Toy Scheme
21. Moon Night Serenade 2
22. Giant rat completed
23. Infiltration 1
24. Infiltration 2
25. Princess Buburina's Brawl
26. Battle 1
27. Battle 2
28. Starry Sky Reminiscence: Battle 3
29. Toriyasu and Papadoll's Recollections
30. In the Battle
31. Starry Sky Reminiscence 2
32. Battle 4
33. Battle 5 "Rescue Meeko"
34. Banipalwit's Theme 4
35. Farewell...And Then
36. Banipalwit's Theme "Door to Dreams"
37. Banipalwit's Theme "Door to Dreams" (Karaoke)
