= Makoto Tezuka =

Japanese film and anime director

Makoto Tezuka (手塚 眞, Tezuka Makoto; born 11 August 1961), officially romanized as Macoto Tezka, is a Japanese film and anime director, born in Tokyo. He fashions himself as a visualist and is involved in the creation of moving images beyond film and animation. He partially owns Tezuka Productions and helped in releasing the posthumous works of his father, Osamu Tezuka.

Tezuka runs his own company, Neontetra. He is a representative of board of directors for Tezuka Osamu Cultural Foundation, a producer and director of Memorial Hall for Tezuka Osamu, a city ambassador to the city of Takarazuka in Hyogo prefecture, a member of the examination board for the Proficiency in Intellectual Property Management, and a board member of Japan Image Council.

Tezuka teaches filmmaking at Tokyo University of Technology and the Image Forum in Tokyo. He is married to manga artist Reiko Okano. Tezuka is a descendant of Hattori Hanzō, a ninja and samurai who served Tokugawa Ieyasu during the Sengoku period in Japan. He supervised Naoki Urasawa and Takashi Nagasaki's Pluto manga series, as it adapts a story arc of his father's own Astro Boy.

== Life ==
Makoto Tezuka was born as the eldest son of Osamu Tezuka. He completed his primary and secondary education at Seikei Academy, known as Seikei Gakuen. As a kid, Makoto loved comics with the motif of monsters and ghosts, showing a preference over "Ultra Q" over "W3" which was produced by Mushi Production, his father's production company at the time. Makoto writes in his own book that he always felt that his father's works are too accessible and available to him that he preferred to seek out something else, hence he never showed keen interest in immersing himself in his father's works.

Makoto's first breakthrough came when he was still a student at Seikei Academy and made 8mm film "Fantastic Party" which was selected for a special award dedicated to talented high school students at a film festival specialized in 8mm films. Nagisa Oshima, who was one of the juries at the festival, and other notable people from the film industry praised Makoto's work. Following his breakthrough, his works "UNK" and " High-School Terror" got selected for Pia Film Festival and brought him acclaim. MaKoto's short film "High School Terror" was a pioneering piece for the booming of the genre of Japanese horror film.

Makoto joined Nihon University, Film Department of the Faculty of Arts, and directed another 8mm film "MOMENT" in 1981. The film gained popularity among youth and was sold widely as DVD. While still in the university, Makoto directed his first feature-length film "The Legend of the Stardust Brothers" in 1985 for theatrical release, in partnership with musician Haruo Chikada. Since then, Makoto has been working in the field of making feature-length film, TV series, art film and PV as visualist.

In 1991, Makoto directed "Todai-ji Densetsu Kongo Kitan (the legend of Todai-ji) which was produced when the high definition TV production was emerging. In the same year, Makoto also directed a documentary film "-Akira Kurosawa-Eiga No Himitsu (secret of the film)".

Makoto was set to direct a game based on his father's anime series Kimba the White Lion named Emperor of the Jungle, which was set to be co-produced with Nintendo and released for the Nintendo 64. Despite gameplay footage being shown at Nintendo Space World 1996 and was appointed a summer 1998 release, the game wound up cancelled due to development issues.

In 1999, Makoto directed "Hakuchi (the innocent)", which took him 10 years to develop. A huge film set was constructed in Niigata prefecture in Japan. The film won Digital award at the Venice International Film Festival and many other international and national awards. The film toured in South Korea, various countries in Latin America, in Europe including France, and in Bahrain as well.

In 2001, Makoto acted as a General Director for the opening ceremony of "East Asian Games 2001".

In 2003, Makoto directed TV animation "Black Jack" (originally written and illustrated by Osamu Tezuka) and received a Tokyo Animation Award in 2006. Makoto also supervised manga series "Pluto" (by Naoki Urasawa and Osamu Tezuka) which got awarded the Best Manga Award of 9th Tezuka Osamu Cultural Prize in 2005. In 2005, Makoto directed stage production of "UZUMI" for the 2005 World Exposition in Aichi prefecture.

In 2012, as part of rehabilitation support, Makoto directed a documentary film "Ogatsu-Revival of the Houin Kagura Tradition"(produced by national federation of UNESCO Associations in Japan). The theme of the film is on the cultural tradition of the area affected by the great East Japan earthquake of 11 March 2011.

In 2013, Makoto directed "I am a shutter girl" as part of the omnibus film "Tokyo Shutter Girl" (original comic was written by Kennichi Kiriki). In 2014, Makoto directed unfinished short animation by Osamu Tezuka "Legend of the Forest". In 2016, Makoto directed "The Brand New Legend of the Stardust Brothers", a sequel to "The Legend of the Stardust Brothers" made in 1985. The film was screened at Tokyo International Film Festival of the same year.

In 2019, Makoto directed "Barbara", originally written by Osamu Tezuka. The film features Goro Inagaki and Fumi Nikaido, was shot by Christopher Doyle, and was premiered at the 32nd Tokyo International Film Festival.

== Selected works ==
=== Film ===
Year	Film	Credited as				Notes
Year	Film	Director	Writer	Editor	Producer	Notes
1985	The Legend of the Stardust Brothers (Hoshikuzu kyôdai no densetsu)	Yes	Yes	Yes		
1999	Hakuchi	Yes	Yes			Also known as The Innocent
1999	Jikken eiga	Yes				Short film Also known as Experimental Film
2004	Shinkuronishiti	Yes	Yes			Also known as Black Kiss
2016	Hoshikuzu kyôdai no aratana densetsu	Yes	Yes		Yes	Sequel to Hoshikuzu kyôdai no densetsu. Also known as The Brand New Legend of the Stardust Brothers
2019	Tezuka's Barbara	Yes		Yes		Adaptation of his father Osamu Tezuka's manga

- A Man, A Woman And A City (a series of short films for the John Foxx release, 2016)

=== Anime ===
- Akuemon (OVA): Director
- Black Jack (2004 TV): director
- Black Jack 21 (TV): Director
- Black Jack Special: The 4 Miracles of Life: Director
- Black Jack: The Two Doctors Of Darkness (movie): Director
- Dr. Pinoko no Mori no Bouken (movie): Supervisor

=== Manga ===
- Pluto: Top Supervisor
- Atom: The Beginning: Supervisor

=== Video game ===
- Fin Fin on Teo the Magic Planet: Director
