= Shinji Sōmai =

Japanese film director (1948–2001)

- Born: 13 January 1948; Morioka, Iwate, Japan
- Died: 9 September 2001 (aged 53); Isehara, Kanagawa, Japan
- Occupation: Film director
- Years active: 1980–2000

Shinji Sōmai (相米 慎二, Sōmai Shinji; 13 January 1948 – 9 September 2001) was a Japanese film director. He directed 13 films between 1980 and 2000 and was noted for his work within seishun-eiga, which include films such as the successful Sailor Suit and Machine Gun (1981) and critically acclaimed Typhoon Club (1985).

== Career and style ==
The most recognizable trademark of Somai is the use of long takes, creating a kind of rupture between reality and the inner emotions of the characters. The first 15 minutes of Lost Chapter of Snow (1985) is probably the best crafted long take of his career.

His film Moving was screened in the Un Certain Regard section at the 1993 Cannes Film Festival. His 1998 film, Wait and See, won the FIPRESCI prize at the 49th Berlin International Film Festival in 1999.

The Edinburgh International Film Festival artistic director Chris Fujiwara noted that American film director Nicholas Ray and French film director Jean Vigo shared Somai's sensibilities.

== Legacy ==
Somai has been cited as one of the most important Japanese directors of not only his generation, but of Japanese cinema as a whole. His influence has been cited by Ryusuke Hamaguchi and Hirokazu Kore-eda as well as critic and theorist Shigehiko Hasumi.

Japan Society presented the first North American retrospective of his work in 2023, which included the world premiere of Typhoon Club's 4K restoration. In 2024, Japan Society would present Somai's Moving with lead actress Tomoko Tabata.

== Filmography ==
- Tonda Couple (1980)
- Sailor Suit and Machine Gun (1981)
- P.P. Rider (1983)
- The Catch (1983)
- Love Hotel (1985)
- Typhoon Club (1985)
- Lost Chapter of Snow: Passion (1985)
- Luminous Woman (1987)
- Tokyo Heaven (1990)
- Moving (1993)
- The Friends (1994)
- Wait and See (1998)
- Kaza-hana (2000)
