= Michiko Kawai =

Japanese actress and singer (born 1968)

- 河合 美智子
- Born: Kazue Suzuki; 13 June 1968 (age 58); Hiratsuka, Kanagawa, Japan
- Other name: Aurora Teruko
- Occupations: Actress; singer
- Years active: 1983–present
- Television: Futarikko
- Height: 162 cm (5 ft 4 in)
- Spouse: Junichi Minemura (m. 2017)

Michiko Kawai (河合 美智子, Kawai Michiko; born 13 June 1968, in Hiratsuka, Kanagawa) is a Japanese actress and singer. Her real name is Kazue Suzuki (鈴木 一栄, Suzuki Kazue). She was represented with ABC inc. As a singer she is nicknamed Aurora Teruko (オーロラ輝子, Ōrora Teruko).

== Filmography ==
=== Films ===
Year	Title	Role
1983	P.P. Rider	Bruce
1985	Yaban Hito no yō ni	Hiromi Kudo
1986	They Were Eleven	Flor (voice)
1986	Maison Ikkoku	Kozue Nanao
1987	Koibito-tachi no Jikoku	Mariko Murakami (Noriko Yamasaki)
1988	Love Story o Kimi ni	Hatsumi Inamura
1989	Fancy Dance	Female reporter
1998	Shomuni	Kana Miyashita
1998	A, Haru	Nurse
2002	Umi wa Miteita	Osono
2005	Makoto	Izumi Noda
2007	Konna Otona no Onnanoko	Berischima editor-in-chief Yoshida
2011	Homecoming	

=== TV dramas ===
Year	Title	Role	Network	Ref.
1985	Half Potato na Oretachi		NTV	
1986	Abunai Deka		NTV	
1987	Jikandesu yo: Futatabi		TBS	
1987	Akireta Keiji	Midori Asakuea	NTV	
1988	Dakishimetai!		Fuji TV	
1988	Schoolgirl Serenade: Keika Gaku Jo Sayokyoku	Noriko Hyodo	NTV	
1989	Motto Abunai Reka	Yumi Ishii	NTV	
1989	Kayō Suspense Gekijō / Ashinaga Ojisan Satsujin Jiken		NTV	
1989	Kattenishiyagare Hay! Brother	Model	NTV	
1990	Sotsugyō	Tomoko Terauchgi	TBS	
1991	Yonimo Kimyōna Monogatari "Kokuhaku Party"		Fuji TV	
1991	Eiga mitaina Koi shitai "Ghost: New York no Maboroshi"		TV Tokyo	
1991	Kenji-Yoko Wakaura		NTV	
1991	Kimi no Na wa	Kozue Ishigami	NHK-G	
1992	Waru	Tomoko Nashida	YTV	
1992	Otona wa Wakattekurenai "Usotsuki"		Fuji TV	
1993	Hitotsu Yane no Shita	Rumiko Matsumae	Fuji TV	
1993	Drama Shinginga: Kora! Nanba shiyo tto II	Kimiko Iwata	NHK-G	
1994	Yu no Machi Kōshinkyoku		NHK-G	
1994	Sengoku Bushi no Yūkyū Kyūka		NHK-G	
1994	Kazoku A	Mayumi Kimura	TBS	
1995	7-Ri no OL ga Iku!	Kaori Yokoyama	TV Asahi	
1996	Mō Otonana 'ndakara!	Izumi Yoshimoto	TBS	
1996	Futarikko	Aurora Teruko	NHK-G	
1996	Kaettekita OL San Nintabi		Fuji TV	
1997	Guddo a futanūn		TBS	
1998	Futatsu no Ai	Kayo	NHK	
1998	Y-shi no Rinjin		TBS	
2000	Bengoshi-Ayuko Takabayashi	Reiko Hisano	NTV	
2003	Onna to Ai to Mystery "Yukemuri Satsujin Annai: Nan nimo Senmu no Mei Suiri"	Urara	TV Tokyo	
2003	Hamidashi Keiji Jōnetsu-kei	Miwako Fujioka	TV Asahi	
2003	Shiroi Kyotō	Midori Konishi	Fuji TV	
2005	Ai to Yūjō no Bugiugi	Kinako Otsuki	NHK-G	
2006	Byōin e Ikō	Rei Yuki	TBS	
2006	Kekkonshiki e Ikō	Ertsuko Fujikura	TBS	
2006	Journey Under the Midnight Sun	Fumiyo Nishimoto	TBS	
2008	Hitomi		NHK-G	
2008	Dandan	Mayumi Ishii	NHK-G	
2008	Tax Inspector Madogiwa Taro	Naoko Ikehata	TBS	
2009	Doyō Wide Gekijō "Po kkaya (Onsen-i) Jiken Karute"	Hisae Hanamura	TV Asahi	
2011	Aibō Season 9	Ayako Kudo	TV Asahi	
2011	Saijō no Meii	Satomi Saito	TV Tokyo	
2011	Shin-Keishichō Sōsaikka 9 Kakari: Dai 6 Series	Satomi Mihara	TV Asahi	
2011	Kasai Chōsakan-Renjirō Kurenai	Sawako Nakayama	TV Asahi	
2012	Beginners!	Akemi Momoe	TBS	
2012	Mitsuhiko Asami Series	Izumi Shimada	TBS	
2015	Chūzai Deka	Kazumi Sayama	TV Tokyo	
2015	Meikyū Sōsa	Junko Kitayama	TV Asahi	
2015	Yamamoto Shūgorō Ninjō Jidaigeki	Oko	BS Japan	
2016	Omiya-san Special	Taeko Adachi	TV Asahi	
2016	Doyō Wide Gekijō "Kasai Chōsakan Yamanobō Akira Funsō Kaiketsu 100% no Otoko!"	Kozue Sugimura	TV Asahi	
2016	100 No Shikaku o Motsu Onna: Futari no Batsuichi Satsujin Sōsa	Yasue Sasaoka	ABC	
2016	Keishichō-Sōsaikkachō	Etsuko Sakagami	TV Asahi	
2016	Onsen Satsujin Jiken Series	Misako Yoshino	TBS	

=== Music programmes ===
Year	Title	Network
2008	Waga Kokoro no Osaka Melody	NHK-G
2009	BS Nihon no uta	NHK-BS2
2012	Mokuyō 8-ji no Concert: Meikyoku! Nippon no uta	TV Tokyo
2014	NHK Kayō Concert	NHK
2016	Dai 16-kai Waga Kokoro no Osaka Melody	NHK-G

=== NHK Kōhaku Uta Gassen entries ===
Year / Brdcst no.	No.	Song	Order	Opponent
1997 / 48th	1st	Fūfu-michi	16/25	Ryuichi Kawamura

==== Others ====
Year	Title	Network
1984	You	NHK-E
1986	"Binetsuna Ki-bu-n tobikiri 16-sai"	
1991	Takeshi Itsumi no Heisei Kyōikuiinkai	Fuji TV
1992	Quiz! Junsuidanjokōyū	TV Asahi
1997	Chō Yoshimoto Shinkigeki	MBS
2008	Watashi ga Kodomo dattakoro	NHK

=== Radio ===
Year	Title	Network
2001	Junji Takada-Michiko Kawai no Tokyo Broadway	NCB
2001	Junji Takada-Michiko Kawai no Tokyo Paradise	NCB
2012	Junji Takada: Mainichi ga Paradise	NCB

=== DVD ===
Year	Title
2008	Jitsuroku Pavilion Sanshōuo!

=== Stage ===
Year	Title
2011	Jankenpon
2012	Suite Memories
2014	Dōshin bo no Hama

== Discography ==
=== Singles ===
Year	Title	Ref.
1983	"Watashi Takan na Koro / School Days"	
1983	"Summer Holiday / Kisetsu, Kawari Koro"	
1984	"Island / Toshigoro Tomato wa Jiken ga ippai"	
1984	"Honjitsu Seiten Sakana Kibun / Binkan Age"	
1986	"Tokoton I Love You / Yumemi-ing Easter"	
1996	"Magokoro no Hashi / Meoto-michi"	
1997	"Hana-gokoro / Setsunakute"	
1997	"Sukiyanen"	
1998	"Kitto Ashitahahareru kara"	
1998	"Sore ga shibutoku Ikiru Michi/ Sotto Dakishimete"	
2005	"Tokyo Paradise"	

=== Albums ===
Year	Title
1998	Aurora Biyori

== Bibliography ==
Year	Title
1997	Ta na bota: Aurora Teruko Hanjō-ki
