= Mirrored Mind =

- Film poster
- Directed by: Gakuryū Ishii
- Written by: Gakuryū Ishii
- Produced by: Gakuryū Ishii; Hironari Igawa
- Starring: Miwako Ichikawa; Yuki Inomata; KEE
- Cinematography: Gakuryū Ishii
- Edited by: Masaki Inoue
- Music by: Hiroyuki Onogawa; Masashi Furuya (Sound)
- Release date: March 30, 2005 (Japan)
- Running time: 61 minutes
- Country: Japan
- Language: Japanese

Mirrored Mind (Japanese: 鏡心, Hepburn: Kyoshin) is a 2005 Japanese experimental drama film by Gakuryū Ishii. The film stars Miwako Ichikawa as an actress experiencing burnout, depression and a crisis of identity. It is a feature-length version of the short film created for Jeonju International Film Festival Digital Project.

== Plot ==
=== Opening sequence ===
“What is the rhythm of nature?” This is one of the first questions that our nameless heroine asks as she struggles to keep her composure in front of her film crew. Her partner urges her to give up on her dream and find another way to live. She responds that without the passion of a dream, eating and drinking serve no purpose. What initially appears to be a heartfelt conversation between two people is then revealed to be a scripted scene she herself wrote for her film.

Prior to this, the film shows fragments of the daily routine interspersed with street shots of Shibuya and Tokyo. Colors are muted: grey by day and the nights are equally dark. She stands at the crosswalks with a disinterested expression, ending her evenings mixing herself a White Russian drink while continuing to work on her projects at home.

=== Synopsis ===
An actress suffering from an identity crisis finds herself spirited away from the bustle of Tokyo to a tropical paradise.

The film is divided into two sections. One is set in the Shibuya of concrete and steel (the archetypal Tokyo) in which the unnamed actress is on the verge of collapse, overwhelmed by numbness and dehumanisation. The other takes place amid the lush, abundant nature of the island of Bali, where she eventually rediscovers the nature within herself.

== Production ==
=== Origins ===
Mirrored Mind originated as a short film entitled Kyo-shin, produced as part of Jeonju Digital Project 2004, which is a collection of three digital short films commissioned by the Jeonju International Film Festival in South Korea. The three shorts were Influenza by Bong Joon-ho, Kyo-shin by Sogo Ishii, and Dance Me to the End of Love by Yu Lik-wai. Ishii subsequently expanded his short into the 61 minute feature released in 2005.

=== Filming ===
The film was shot on video, a choice that, according to critic Tom Mes, produces images of such striking clarity they can justly be called luminous. This hyperreality that makes the viewer, as Ishii himself put it, forget there was a camera involved in the first place. Filming took place in two contrasting locations: the Shibuya district of Tokyo and the island of Bali, Indonesia.

=== Directorial approach ===
Ishii has described Mirrored Mind as a fresh start, likening the experience of making it to starting over from zero as a filmmaker.

=== Music ===
The original score was composed by Hiroyuki Onogawa, who had previously collaborated with Ishii on August in the Water (1995). Onogawa's delicate score contrasts urban chaos with serene soundscapes, using music and ambient sound to reflect the protagonist's inner states, turning visual and sonic elements into a meditation on selfhood, stillness, and spiritual peace.

== Thematic analysis ==
Mirrored Mind centers on the duality of urban and natural environments as a reflection of inner psychological states. The same sun that sets into the tropical sea also reflects off steel. The same rain falls on the leaves and on the asphalt. The same clouds pass over forests and cities. If man is a product of nature, then what is man-made must inevitably contain something natural inside it. This is the knot the film seeks to untie.

Rather than an intellectual film, Mirrored Mind is above all an emotional one: it sets out to make the audience feel rather than think. The thinking is reserved for after the film. Ishii's message is honest and grounded - it concerns the struggle of a woman who has become immobilized.

Critics have noted the film's place within Ishii's broader filmography as a pivotal transition. Mirrored Mind carries within it the remnants of what came before in Ishii's work: the contrasting of town and country from Angel Dust, the plunge into man's tropical roots from August in the Water, the meditative tone of The Master of Shiatsu, and the experiments with immersive sound from Electric Dragon 80,000V. In that sense, the film is like a mirror that works two ways: on one side it reflects what came before, and on the other it projects a beacon into the as yet unwritten future.

Miwako Ichikawa (市川 実和子)
- Born: 19 March 1976 (age 50); Ōta, Tokyo
- is a Japanese actress and model, sister of actress Mikako Ichikawa. She began her career as a model in 1991 and made her acting debut in 2000 in Another Heaven. Mirrored Mind gave her a rare leading role following supporting parts in films such as All About Lily Chou-Chou (2001).

== Cast ==
| Actor | Role |
|---|---|
| Miwako Ichikawa | The Actress (protagonist) |
| Yuki Inomata | Supporting role |
| Kiyohiko Shibukawa (KEE) | Supporting role |
| Kou Machida | Supporting role |
| Maki Tanaka | Supporting role |
| Noriko Naki | Supporting role |
| Ikuyo Ishii | Supporting role |
| Yuka Jitsukawa | Supporting role |
| Yoshiyuki Matsumoto | Supporting role |
| Akio Fujita | Supporting role |
| Daichi Ichihara | Supporting role |
| Yumiko Tanaka | Supporting role |

== Critical reception ==
Mirrored Mind has received a positive critical reception, particularly among critics specializing in Japanese cinema.

Writing for Midnight Eye, Tom Mes praises the film as a significant step in Ishii's evolution, describing its images as being of such striking clarity that they can justly be called luminous, and noticing that what at first glance seems atypical ultimately becomes a natural next step in Ishii's development as a filmmaker.

The critic at onderhond.com awarded the film a perfect score, calling it his absolute favorite Sogo Ishii film, and describing how its visuals transport the viewer to a different world for sixty minutes, leaving them comforted and touched by the protagonist's struggle.

The only critical reservation came from Tom Mes, who noted that for the first twenty minutes or so, fans of Ishii might wonder whether they are watching one of his films at all, as the early sections (composed of lengthy soliloquies by an alienated female Tokyoite) tend toward the kind of arthouse navel-gazing typical of some post-Ishii independents.

== Director - Gakuryu Ishii ==
Gakuryu Ishii (石井岳龍; born 15 January 1957), formerly known as Sogo Ishii, is a Japanese filmmaker whose early works were closely tied to punk subcultures and underground cinema. His films have been associated with the emergence of Japanese cyberpunk. Raised in Hakata, a region influenced by the presence of U.S. military bases and a strong local music scene, he became immersed in punk rock during his teenage years and began experimenting with film while studying at Nihon University in Tokyo.

Ishii himself has reflected on this divide in his own career. Speaking about his early filmography, he stated: "My first four films were made between 1980 and 1983. I call them my 'punk movies'. These films are liked by a lot of people and my public image is based on these films, so that's why I'm seen as the 'punk director'".

In 1994, he returned to feature filmmaking with Angel Dust, followed by August in the Water and Labyrinth of Dreams, signaling a shift toward more meditative, visually experimental narratives. In the 2000s, he collaborated with actor Tadanobu Asano on Electric Dragon 80,000V (2001) and Gojoe (2000). Following financial difficulties, he spent several years teaching at Kobe Design University. In 2012, he resumed feature filmmaking with Isn't Anyone Alive?, adopting the name Gakuryu Ishii (a reference to traditional Japanese practices of renaming at moments of personal transition).

Mirrored Mind was produced during a transitional period in Ishii's career. The film has been described as "a meditative art film that acted as a coda to his philosophical filmmaking of the 90s". It was released two years after Dead End Run (2003) and preceded by nearly a decade his return to feature filmmaking with Isn't Anyone Alive? (2012)
