= The Private Detective Mike =

2002 Japanese television series

- Genre: Mystery
- Based on: Mike Hama trilogy by Kaizo Hayashi
- Starring: Masatoshi Nagase
- Country of origin: Japan
- Original language: Japanese
- No. of episodes: 12

Production
- Running time: 54 minutes
- Production company: Yomiuri Telecasting Corporation

Original release
- Network: Nippon Television
- Release: July 1 – September 16, 2002

The Private Detective Mike (私立探偵 濱マイク, Shiritsu tantei Hama Maiku) is a Japanese television series starring Masatoshi Nagase as the private detective Mike Hama. Each episode of the series was a self-contained story, involving different sets of directors and screenwriters, including Isao Yukisada, Gakuryū Ishii, and Alex Cox. Nagase originally starred as Mike Hama in a trilogy of films directed by Kaizo Hayashi, beginning with The Most Terrible Time in My Life.

== Synopsis ==
Mike Hama runs a detective agency from an office on the roof of Nichigeki movie theater. Perpetually short on cash, he takes on all sorts of jobs — missing family members, unfaithful spouses, lost pets — and always gets into trouble.

== Production ==
The Private Detective Mike was Nagase's first television role in a decade. The year before, Nagase had starred in a series of popular commercials for Boss Coffee, directed by Ryosuke Maeda, who would go on to direct the second episode of The Private Detective Mike. Suguru Takeuchi, director of episode ten, was also a commercial and music video director. The remaining directors had experience in feature films as directors, screenwriters or assistant directors. Kaizo Hayashi was not involved in the production of the series because he was overseas at the time.

The series was shot on 16mm film. According to Nagase, the decision was due in part to the fact the character of Mike Hama had originated on film. In addition, the television dramas that Nagase and much of the cast and crew had watched as children, such as Detective Story, had been shot on film, which was then being displaced by video.

The sixth episode, directed by Shinji Aoyama, was the first to be completed. A feature-length version of the episode was screened at the 52nd Berlin International Film Festival under the title Mike Yokohama: A Forest with No Name before the series proper aired on television.

== Cast ==
- Masatoshi Nagase as Mike Hama
- Mika Nakashima as Akane Hama
- Miwako Ichikawa as Milk
- Jun Murakami as Joji
- Shunsuke Matsuoka as Tadashi
- Haruka Igawa as Hiru
- Miyuki Matsuda as Sayoko
- Sadao Abe as Makoto
- Wakana Sakai as Mint
- Aki Kawamura as Noriko
- Tatsuya Nakamura as Nobu
- Masashi Yamamoto as Yamamoto
- Kyoko Koizumi as Saki

=== Guest cast ===
- Miho Kanno as Satsuki (episode 1)
- UA as Naomi (episode 2)
- Yōsuke Kubozuka as Kitamura (episode 5)
- Kyōka Suzuki as Doctor (episode 6)
- Eita Nagayama as Chihiro (episode 8)
- Jai West as Jake (episode 9)
- Tadanobu Asano as Yukio (episode 10)
- Shinya Tsukamoto as Amami (episode 11)
- Tomorowo Taguchi as Karasu (episode 11)

== Episodes ==
The series aired on Nippon TV every Monday from July 1 to September 16, 2002. The televised version of the series was released on VHS, while the DVD release contained the feature-length director's cuts of each episode. The series' opening sequence directed by fashion photographer Glen Luchford with theme song by Ego-Wrappin' was excluded from feature-length version of the episodes.

On its 20th anniversary, the series was released in its original televised form on Hulu and Amazon Prime in Japan.

No.	Title	Directed by	Written by	Original release date
1	"31→1 Fable"; Transliteration: "31→1 no guwa" (Japanese: 31→1の寓話)	Akira Ogata	Kenji Aoki	July 1, 2002
2	"Diva"; Transliteration: "Uta hime" (Japanese: 歌姫)	Ryosuke Maeda	Ryosuke Maeda	July 8, 2002
3	"Wherever You Go, Go Far"; Transliteration: "Doko made mo tōku e" (Japanese: どこまでも遠くへ)	Kôji Hagiuda	Kishu Izuchi	July 15, 2002
4	"Sakura Sakuhi"; Transliteration: "Sakurasakuhi" (Japanese: サクラサクヒ)	Isao Yukisada	Isao Yukisada and Shoichi Mashiko	July 22, 2002
5	"Flower"; Transliteration: "Hana" (Japanese: 花)	Hideaki Sunaga	Miyagi Yoshihiko	July 29, 2002
6	"Forest With No Name"; Transliteration: "Namae no nai mori" (Japanese: 名前のない森)	Shinji Aoyama	Shinji Aoyama	August 5, 2002
7	"Private Life"; Transliteration: "Shiseikatsu" (Japanese: 私生活)	Ryo Iwamatsu	Ryo Iwamatsu	August 12, 2002
8	"Time Goes By, You're Beautiful"; Transliteration: "Tokiyo tomare, kimi wa utsukushi" (Japanese: 時よとまれ、君は美しい)	Sogo Ishii	Akio Satsukawa	August 19, 2002
9	"Mister Nippon: 21st Century Man"; Transliteration: "Mister Nippon ~ 21 seiki no otoko" (Japanese: ミスター・ニッポン〜21世紀の男)	Tetsuya Nakashima	Tetsuya Nakashima	August 26, 2002
10	"700 Yen a Minute"; Transliteration: "1-funkan 700-en" (Japanese: 1分間700円)	Suguru Takeuchi	Naito Yamada	September 2, 2002
11	"Woman and Man, Man and Woman (Note: also known as Mike Hama Must Die!)"; Transliteration: "Onna to otoko, otoko to onna" (Japanese: 女と男、男と女)	Alex Cox	Alex Cox	September 9, 2002
12	"Bitters End"; Transliteration: "Bitāzuendo" (Japanese: ビターズエンド)	Gō Rijū	Gō Rijū	September 16, 2002
