= Death Powder =

1986 Japanese cyberpunk horror film by Shigeru Izumiya

- DVD cover
- Directed by: Shigeru Izumiya
- Written by: Shigeru Izumiya
- Produced by: Shigeru Izumiya
- Starring: Shigeru Izumiya; Rikako Murakami; Takichi Inukai
- Cinematography: Kazuo Komizu
- Music by: Shigeru Izumiya
- Production companies: Media Mix Japan; Essen Communications
- Release date: 21 June 1986 (Japan)
- Running time: 62 minutes
- Country: Japan
- Language: Japanese

Death Powder (Japanese: デスパウダー, Hepburn: Desu Paudā) is a 1986 low-budget Japanese science fiction/horror film with body horror elements, written and directed by poet/folk singer Shigeru Izumiya.

The experimental film is credited as being the first core of the Japanese cyberpunk subgenre that emerged during the 1980s, predating both Katsuhiro Otomo's anime film adaptation of Akira and Shinya Tsukamoto's Tetsuo: The Iron Man.

Izumiya also stars in his own film, as one of the three scientists who have stolen a cybernetic android and taken it to an abandoned warehouse.

== Plot ==
In the very near future, a group of three conspirators capture a very special android named Guernica. The scientists bring her to a deserted warehouse, and tie her to a cot, with a protective covering over her mouth. One assisting researcher (Harima) is left to guard the Guernica, but the android secretes a reality-altering substance, causing Harima to slowly lose his mind. The lead researcher and his female colleague (Norris) apparently have just escaped and are on their way back to the warehouse. Norris tries calling Harima and discovers that something must be wrong. They proceed carefully into the warehouse where they discover that Harima has gone crazy and now wants to kill them. Harima makes it to Guernica, who suddenly sits up and blows dust all over him. After this point the movie turns extremely surreal. Guernica's body slowly disappears into dust, fighting and shooting are laced with hallucinations and end in a final act of violence.

Even though dialogue plays a rather minor role in the film, only about a quarter of it is actually translated in English.

== Cast ==
Only the main characters:

- Takichi Inukai as Unnamed male researcher
- Rikako Murakami as Norris
- Shigeru Izumiya as Harima (third researcher)
- Mari Natsuki as Android Guernica

== Cyberpunk with body horror ==
Death Power is also the earliest work which combined cyberpunk with body horror. Japanese films of this subgenre counter fears and anxieties of technological advancements by re-imagining the rise of technology as well as its effects on the individual and the society. To contradict apocalyptic fears of advancing technology, films which combine these elements offer a vision of a "New Flesh". A thesis from the University of Arkansas explored five films of the sub-genre - referring to them as examples of "New Flesh Cinema". Death Powder is the oldest of the five films, followed by Akira and Tetsuo: The Iron Man. The two other films used as models for the sub-genre are 964 Pinocchio (1991) and Rubber's Lover (1996), both directed by Shozin Fukui. In all of these films, technology serves as a mediator of our actions, interactions, and perception of reality. Besides that, they all stress the importance and discomfort of adapting and transforming, and finally address technophobia by revealing a fascination and fear of technology as well as the necessity to change towards a new and different world.
