= 964 Pinocchio =

1991 Japanese cyberpunk film by Shozin Fukui

- Theatrical release poster
- Kanji: ピノキオ√964
- Directed by: Shozin Fukui
- Screenplay by: Shozin Fukui; Makoto Hamaguchi; Naoshi Gôda
- Story by: Shozin Fukui
- Starring: Haji Suzuki; Onn-chan
- Cinematography: Kazunori Hirasawa
- Edited by: Shozin Fukui
- Music by: Hiroyuki Nagashima
- Production company: Honekoubou
- Distributed by: Honekoubou
- Release date: 14 September 1991 (Japan)
- Running time: 97 minutes
- Country: Japan
- Language: Japanese

964 Pinocchio (Japanese: ピノキオ√964, Hepburn: Pinokio√964; lit. 'Pinocchio√964'), released in the United Kingdom as Screams of Blasphemy, is a 1991 Japanese cyberpunk-horror film directed by Shozin Fukui.

== Plot ==
964 Pinocchio is a memory-wiped sex-slave cyborg who is disposed of by his owners for failing to maintain an erection. While wandering aimlessly through the city, he is discovered by Himiko, a homeless girl, who has also been memory-wiped, but remains fully functional. She spends her days drawing maps of the city to aid other amnesiac people.

Himiko takes Pinocchio home and tries to teach him to speak. After much effort, he has a breakthrough and finally becomes aware of his situation. Meanwhile, Pinocchio’s head director, accompanied by his secretary, sends three employees, including a captain, to find Pinocchio. Himiko takes Pinocchio to the train station, where she sees the employees. Pinocchio then disappears, and Himiko finds him in her house after desperately searching for him in the station. Himiko and Pinocchio kiss and become physically intimate, triggering something in both of them. Himiko wakes up and finds Pinocchio's body erupting in an inexplicable metamorphosis, spewing blood, pus, and vomit. This occurrence allows Himiko's memories to return. In a rampage, she runs back to the train station, where she screams and vomits.

Himiko returns and pretends to help Pinocchio, but later shackles him to a pyramidal concrete block and drags him around the city. Back at her house, she tortures him. She finds one of employees, who rushes to call the head director after he sees Pinocchio. Meanwhile, the captain kidnaps a young girl in the train station. Another employee was sent by the director to kill both Himiko and Pinocchio with a toxic weapon, but when he attacks Himiko, she dodges the attack and kills him. Pinocchio eventually regains his memories and escapes, running through the city at high-speed as crowds of horrified civilians watch.

Himiko teams up with Pinocchio's developers to put an end on his destructive reign. Pinocchio reaches the factory where he was built and confronts his developers. Pinocchio disembowels his head director before running off, leaving his horrified secretary and employee behind. Later, Pinocchio finds Himiko, who commands him to tear off his face, but tears off her own instead, revealing a large stone-like head. Enraged, Pinocchio rips her head off her shoulders and places it over his own. The two fuse into a singular entity and declare that they love being together.

== Cast ==
- Haji Suzuki as Pinocchio, a memory wiped cyborg who was thrown out due to him having an erectile dysfunction. He later gets a metamorphosis before setting off in a rampage.
- Onn-chan as Himiko, A homeless girl who takes care of Pinocchio and draws maps of the city to aid other memory-wiped people. She later experiences a metamorphosis, causing her to envision a past version of herself stabbing something. After this, she betrays Pinocchio.
- Mitsuji Otsubo as Narishima, a mercenary tasked with capturing Pinocchio under the orders of the head director.
- Kyoko Hara as the Secretary, an assistant to the head director, known for her unsettling and surreal demeanor.
- San’yutei Rakumaro as the Captain, a member of the team pursuing Pinocchio.
- Hisashi Goda as the Hungry Ghost, a mysterious figure contributing to the film's hallucinatory tone.
- Kita Koji as the Magic Man (guest appearance),

== Production ==
964 Pinocchio was created on a low-budget using guerrilla-filmmaking techniques, with scenes filmed in Tokyo utilizing reactions from real crowds of people. The team had to get permits for most of the scenes filmed on the streets. The famous scene of Pinocchio parting a crowd of people while running through Tokyo was shot in Shinjuku in a pedestrianised area. According to Fukui, it was one of the few scenes filmed in the city without a permit due to the crew being legally bound to shoot off the road.

After working on Tetsuo: The Iron Man as an assistant director, Fukui was encouraged by director friend Sogo Ishii to direct a feature. After working on special effects and editing for Ishii's 1989 short film,The Master of Shiatsu, Shozin would finally have an idea for a story which would later become known to be 964 Pinocchio.

According to an interview with Fukui on the 88 Films Blu-ray release, the script was written while he was homeless.

The actress who played Himiko was initially just a crew member until she was cast a week before filming started. She is credited in the movie as Onn-chan, which was a pseudonym created for the film. 964 Pinocchio was the only movie she ever acted in. The actor who played Pinocchio, Haji Suzuki, had a personal life with his parents being farmers, he had returned to his hometown, got married, and has since taken over the farm.

Due to the limited budget, some improvisations had to be made during filming. Director Shozin Fukui stated in a 2007 interview included in the DVD release that they used an old wheelchair as a makeshift dolly. Filming and editing lasted 6 months each. The smoke bombs used during filming were quoted to have "smelled very bad" and were difficult to control. Following the release of 964 Pinocchio, most of the actors quit all their involvement, indicating they felt that they had completed their performance.

To promote the film prior to its release, Fukui had flyers and posters put up at music venues, movie theatres, galleries, restaurants and event spaces. He even spray-painted promotional material on a car and drove it around the city.

Fukui has cited Blade Runner, Possession and The Texas Chainsaw Massacre as big influences on his work.

== Release ==
The film was shown at the Rotterdam Film Festival, which Shozin never went despite the programmer seeing the film and had played it there. Shozin was also even given a photo of the audience at the festival during the screening.

Unearthed Films released the film on DVD in the United States in 2007.

The film was released in a single edition DVD and in the Cyberpunk Collection alongside Fukui's Rubber's Lover.

964 Pinocchio was re-issued for the first time on Blu-Ray on February 7, 2023, by Media Blasters, and again for March 24, 2025 by 88 Films, including a booklet essay by Mark Player, Fukui's earlier short films, Gerorisuto and Caterpillar, along with both a filmed introduction from Stephen Thrower, a new interview with Fukui along with the aforementioned 2007 interview.

== Reception ==
A ScreenAnarchy review stated, "964 Pinocchio is meticulously tailored to weigh on its audience. ... You're sure to be completely exhausted when the end credits finally grace the screen ... the constant presence of screaming, yelling, grunting and whining bears its own unique sense of torture", comparing it to films like Tetsuo: The Iron Man and Electric Dragon 80.000 V.

A 2022 retrospective article by Collider described it as "an uncommon and unparalleled riff on the timeless fairy-tale".
