= Burst City =

1982 Japanese film by Sogo Ishii

- Film poster
- Directed by: Gakuryū Ishii
- Written by: Gakuryū Ishii; Mitsuhiko Akita
- Produced by: Mitsuhiko Akita; Hiroshi Kobayashi
- Starring: Takanori Jinnai; Shinya Ohe; Tsui Tobu; Kō Machida; Shigeru Izumiya
- Cinematography: Norimichi Kasamatsu
- Edited by: Gakuryū Ishii; Naoto Yamakawa; Junji Sakamoto
- Distributed by: Toei Company
- Release date: March 13, 1982 (Japan)
- Running time: 115 minutes
- Country: Japan
- Languages: Japanese

Burst City (Japanese: 爆裂都市 BURST CITY(バースト・シティ), Hepburn: Bakuretsu Toshi Bāsuto Shiti) is a Japanese dystopian punk rock musical / action film. Released in 1982, the film was directed by Gakuryū Ishii. Primarily a showcase for various specific punk rock bands of the time such as The Roosters, The Rockers, and The Stalin, the film is also purely demonstrative of the culture and attitude of the punk rock community of Japan in the mid-to-late 1970s and the early 1980s, and is considered a defining film of that subculture.

== Plot ==
The plot is not very complex, as much of the action and drama of the film relies on musical interludes, character interactions, and commentary on the class system in the film's fictional universe. What plot there is follows two different threads.

In the first thread, residents in a dystopian future attempt to rebel against the construction of a nuclear power plant in their part of Tokyo. They race cars, party, and brawl to the music of The Rockers and The Stalin. In the second, a small mute and his hard-core friend ride their bikes around the city, hunting down the person who murdered the mute's brother.

The two threads combine when the bikers meet the power plant construction workers and discover that the oppressive businessman who runs the power plant is the same man which they have been searching for. The bikers, workers, and punks all band together to take on the businessman and his yakuza buddies. The "battle police" arrive, and everything erupts into violence.

== Production ==
Ishii created Burst City right in the middle of the punk movement in Japan, and many contemporary punk musicians took on leading acting roles in the film, as well as performing songs in the film. Ishii wanted to feature musicians from all three of the major punk hubs in Japan: The Stalin were from Tokyo, Machizo Machida was from Kansai, and The Roosters and the Rockers were from Kyushu. The cast and crew lived on the post-apocalyptic set that they built for the duration of the shoot.

To give the film a fresh, revolutionary feel, Ishii experimented with a lot of different techniques. The editing style is extremely fast and chaotic, and some scenes combine a mix of undercranked shots and regular speed shots with striking results. Musical numbers and scenes of performers getting ready backstage are shot in a documentary style. The backgrounds are populated with thousands of extras in eccentric costumes and hairstyles, all captured in grainy 16mm film.

== Release ==
The film was distributed by the Toei studio. It was later released on Region 1 DVD by Discotek in June 2006, and then on Blu-ray in January 2016 by Toei. It was released on Blu-Ray on Region 1 by Arrow Video in November 2020.

== Reception ==
The film is highly regarded among critics and audiences alike. Its hyperkinetic, unrelentingly high energy style was wildly different from other films of the period and extremely innovative. The film is also regarded for being purely inspired from music, and the way the punk aesthetic, culture, and music exerts its influence over every element, scene, and character in the film. It has been called one of the "starting points in contemporary Japanese cinema", along with Ishii's own Shuffle, Panic in High School, and Crazy Thunder Road.

It is debatable whether the cinematic innovations of yesterday translate to viewers today. Todd Brown of ScreenAnarchy argued that "while Burst City is clearly a watershed film, it stands up better as a cultural document than as a film, per se," but Simon Abrams wrote on RogerEbert.com that the director "perfectly captures his subjects' prickly, defiant attitude, making Burst City a defiant (and still-relevant) reaction to nuclear proliferation."

== Soundtrack ==
爆裂都市 (BURST CITY) オリジナルサウンドトラック

Soundtrack album by Various
- Released: 5 March 1982
- Genre: Rock
- Length: 37min 51sec
- Label: SEE・SAW

The Burst City original soundtrack was released by SEE SAW on March 5, 1982.

=== Releases ===
No.	Date	Label	Format	Product Number
1	5 March 1982	SEE・SAW	LP	C28A0207
2	7 December 1988	SEE・SAW	CD	D25P6295
3	20 May 1994	Pony Canyon	CD	PCCA-00584
4	20 November 2002	SEE・SAW	CD	PCCA-01812

=== Tracklist ===
A Side
No.	Title	Lyrics	Music	Arrangement	Length
1.	"ソルジャー" (1984)		Junji Ikehata	1984	3:19
2.	"セル ナンバー 8（第8病棟）" (Battle Rockers)	Takanori Jinnai	Shinya Ohe	Battle Rockers	3:53
3.	"ワイルド・スーパーマーケット" (Battle Rockers)	Shinya Ohe	Shinya Ohe	Battle Rockers	3:02
4.	"シャープシューズでケリ上げろ!" (The Rockers)	Takanori Jinnai	Tanio Tani	The Rockers	1:29
5.	"プア ボーイ" (The Rockers)	Takanori Jinnai	Takanori Jinnai	The Rockers	3:23
6.	"ソロー" (1984)		Tomio Inoue	1984	1:38
7.	"シスターダークネス" (Battle Rockers)	Shinya Ohe	Shinya Ohe	Battle Rockers	2:59

B Side
No.	Title	Lyrics	Music	Arrangement	Length
8.	"視界ゼロの女(マチ)" (Takanori Jinnai)	Shigeru Izumiya	Takanori Jinnai	The Rockers	3:19
9.	"キックス" (1984)		Hiroyuki Hanada	1984	2:37
10.	"マイト ガイ" (The Rockers)	Takanori Jinnai	Tanio Tani	The Rockers	2:06
11.	"バチラス ボンブ（細菌爆弾）" (Battle Rockers)	Shinya Ohe	Shinya Ohe	The Rockers	2:21
12.	"フラストレーション" (Battle Rockers)	Takanori Jinnai	Takanori Jinnai	Battle Rockers	1:56
13.	"ボロボロ" (Battle Rockers)	Takanori Jinnai	Tanio Tani	Battle Rockers	1:44
14.	"セル ナンバー 8（第8病棟） リプリーズ" (Battle Rockers)	Takanori Jinnai	Shinya Ohe	Battle Rockers	3:37

== See also ==
- Cyberpunk
- Japanese cyberpunk
- Punk film
