= S94 =

S94 may refer to:

- S-94 (film), a 2009 science fiction/horror short film
- S94 (New York City bus) serving Staten Island
- County Route S94 (Bergen County, New Jersey)
- Port of Whitman Business Air Center Airport, in Whitman County, Washington, United States
- SIPA S.94, a French trainer aircraft
