= 7 Blades =

2000 video game

- PAL version cover art
- Developers: Konami Computer Entertainment Japan East; Paradise Pictures
- Publisher: Konami
- Director: Kaizo Hayashi
- Producer: Atsushi Horigami
- Platform: PlayStation 2
- Release: JP: December 21, 2000; PAL: September 28, 2001
- Genre: Action-adventure
- Mode: Single-player

7 Blades (Note: 7 Blades (セブンブレイズ)) is an action-adventure video game developed by Konami for the PlayStation 2 home game console. It was released in Japan on December 21, 2000 and in PAL regions on September 28, 2001.

== Plot ==
7 Blades is based on the 1990 film Zipang, directed by Japanese filmmaker Kaizo Hayashi. The game takes place in mid-17th century Japan, during which the Tokugawa shogunate was gaining power. The game is set on the man-made island Dejima, which the Japanese government is using to house Western foreigners and where a Christian group is trying to separate from the rest of the country. The main character is Gokurakumaru, a violent mercenary and poor womanizer. He travels with his gun-wielding love interest (Oyuri) and sidekick (Togizo). The latter provides comic relief and holds the swords as Gokurakumaru collects them one by one.

== Development and release ==
7 Blades was developed by Konami Computer Entertainment Japan East in association with Paradise Pictures. The game was in development for over two years with a staff of around 20 people. Konami was assisted by Hayashi, who served as the game's directing supervisor and was given creative control over its storyline, dialogue, and action. Hayashi had not been involved in video games prior to 7 Blades, but began leaning towards production of such a game when visual advances in computer graphics were made in the medium, striving to make it "universally appealing". Hayashi wanted 7 Blades to cover a wide range of genres, and even with the player killing a large number of enemies, he hoped that it could also be enjoyed as a sophisticated sword-fighting game. Hayashi felt that meshing the story branches of the two playable characters was a feature "only possible in a game". Hayashi chose to create a game rather than a film due to what he perceived as the limitless potential of games.

Both Hayashi and producer Atsushi Horigami understood the importance of gameplay and insisted on making "a movie with some very deep action gameplay elements". Project director and writer Shinsuke Mukai described the game as similar to both Tomb Raider and Tenchu while leaning towards more action and less stealth-focused gameplay. The game was initially planned for the original PlayStation. However, the developer was only able to achieve three enemies alongside the player so more powerful technology was sought. The Dreamcast was a consideration, but the PlayStation 2's hardware allowed for superior backgrounds and up to 20 simultaneous enemies.

7 Blades was announced by Konami in May 2000, just before the Electronic Entertainment Expo (E3). Konami released the first screenshots of the game in July of that year and made it available to play at the Tokyo Game Show in September. The game was released in Japan on December 21, 2000 alongside the 7 Blades Original Soundtrack produced by the Meyna Company and the single for the opening theme "Love Will See Us Though" by Sayaka Kubo. A novelization of the game titled 7 Blades Jigoku Gokurakumaru to Teppou Oyuri (7BLADES—地獄極楽丸と鉄砲お百合) by Ryosuke Sakaki was published by Dengeki Media Works in February 2002.

== Reception ==
Reception

Aggregate score
Aggregator	Score
GameRankings	64.5%

Review scores
Publication	Score
Edge	4/10
Jeuxvideo.com	14/20
PlayStation Official Magazine – UK	6/10
Play	46%

7 Blades was met with an indifferent critical response from European and Australian publications, currently holding an aggregate score of 64.5% on GameRankings.

The game was re-released under the "Konami the Best" range of budget titles in Japan, as well as its collection of European budget titles.
