= Zipang =

Zipang (Japanese: ジパング, Hepburn: Jipangu) may refer to:

- An antiquated name for Japan
- Zipang (film), a 1990 Japanese film
- Zipang (manga), a Japanese manga series, anime, and video game
- A fictional state in the My-Otome anime series; see List of My-Otome characters § Zipang
- A Japanese song by Hyde and Yoshiki
- The PC Engine version of the video game Solomon's Key

== See also ==
- "Zipangu" (song), by Pink Lady
