= Mike Yokohama: A Forest with No Name =

2002 television film by Shinji Aoyama

- American DVD cover
- Japanese: 私立探偵 濱マイク 名前のない森
- Directed by: Shinji Aoyama
- Written by: Shinji Aoyama
- Based on: Mike Hama trilogy by Kaizo Hayashi
- Starring: Masatoshi Nagase
- Cinematography: Masaki Tamura
- Edited by: Yuji Oshige
- Music by: Dowser
- Production company: Yomiuri Telecasting Corporation
- Release date: 11 February 2002 (Berlin International Film Festival)
- Running time: 71 minutes
- Country: Japan
- Language: Japanese

Mike Yokohama: A Forest with No Name (Japanese: 私立探偵 濱マイク 名前のない森, Hepburn: Shiritsu Tantei Hama Maiku Namae no Nai Mori) is a 2002 Japanese film directed by Shinji Aoyama, starring Masatoshi Nagase. The film is a feature-length cut of an episode of the television series The Private Detective Mike shown at film festivals and released theatrically.

== Cast ==
- Masatoshi Nagase as Mike Hama
- Kyōka Suzuki as Doctor
- Nene Otsuka as No. 29
- Yoshio Harada as Client
- Masashi Yamamoto as Yamamoto
- Yuriko Kikuchi as No. 17

== Production ==
Mike Yokohama: A Forest with No Name was originally one episode in the 12-part television series The Private Detective Mike which aired on Yomiuri TV in 2002. Each episode was 45–55 minutes long and shot by a different director, including such well-known filmmakers as Alex Cox, Shinobu Yaguchi, and Isao Yukisada. All of them featured the character Mike Hama, a detective who was the center of a trilogy of films directed by Kaizo Hayashi. Aoyama's episode was shot in super 16 mm and blown up to 35 mm for release in theatres.

== Release ==
The film was screened at the 52nd Berlin International Film Festival in 2002 and at the Cleveland International Film Festival in 2003. The film was received a theatrical release in France under the title La forêt sans nom.

== Reception ==
Todd Brown of Twitch Film described the film as "a strikingly composed and completely open ended study of the nature of desire and identity." He said, "[Shinji] Aoyama's stylistic flourishes are in full effect and Masatoshi Nagase gives an excellent, multi layered performance as Hama himself." On the other hand, Time Out London's review was less favourable. The reviewers at FilmBizarro found the movie enjoyable, and noted that watching it "will lead to interesting conversations between viewers".
