= Yusuke Iseya =

Japanese actor (born 1976)

- 伊勢谷 友介
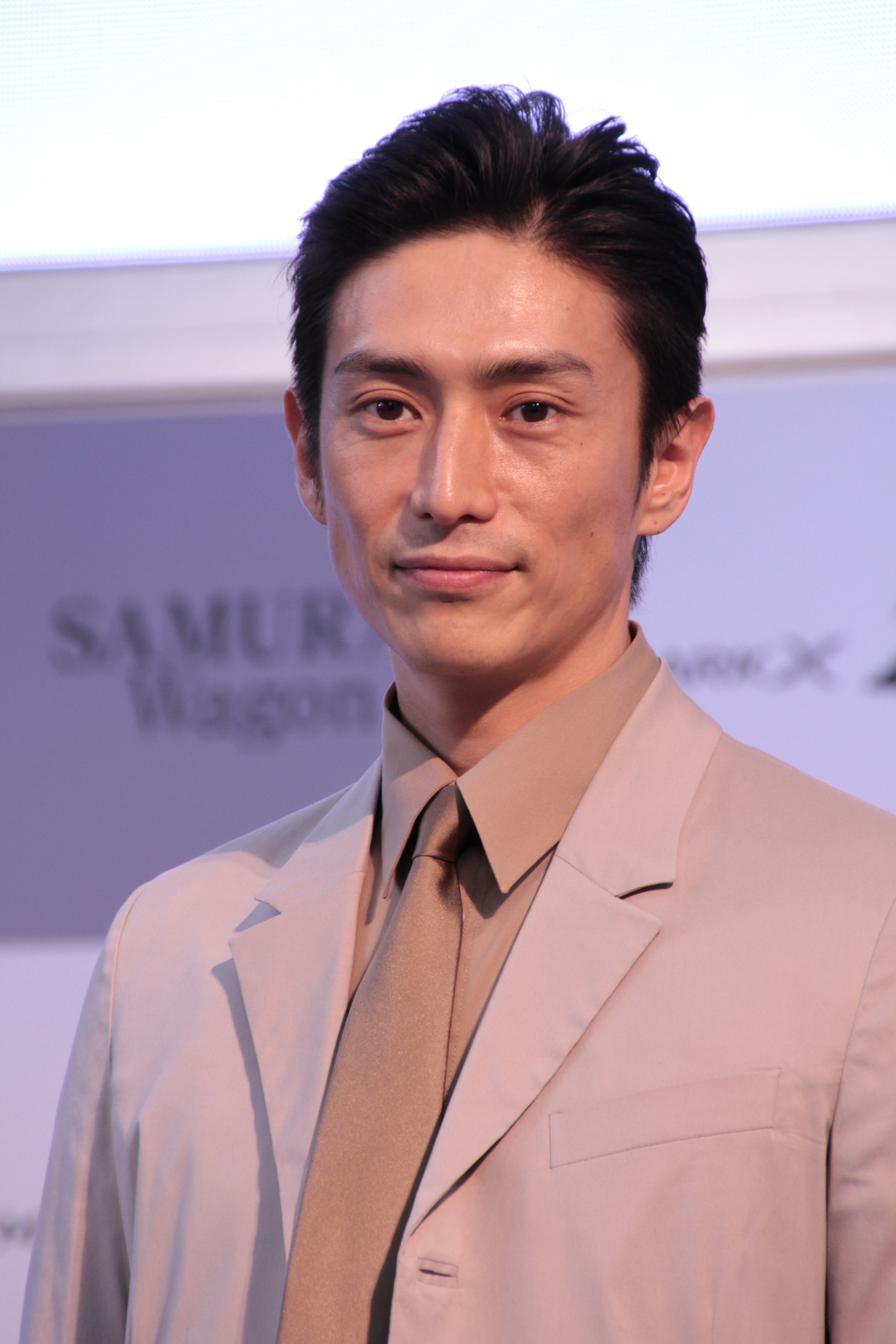
- Born: Yūsuke Iseya (伊㔟谷 友介); 29 May 1976 (age 50); Setagaya-ku, Tokyo, Japan
- Education: Tokyo University of the Arts
- Occupations: Actor, director, artist, businessman
- Years active: 1998–present
- Height: 180 cm (5 ft 11 in)
- Relatives: Kansai Yamamoto (half brother); Mirai Yamamoto (niece)
- Website: REBIRTH PROJECT Co., Ltd

Yusuke Iseya (伊勢谷 友介, Iseya Yūsuke; born 29 May 1976) is a Japanese actor, director, artist, and businessman.

== Career ==
Iseya co-starred with Arata Iura, Yui Natsukawa, and Susumu Terajima in Hirokazu Koreeda's Distance. He appeared in Takashi Miike's 13 Assassins.

He has also appeared in films such as Gakuryu Ishii's Dead End Run, Miike's Sukiyaki Western: Django, and Fernando Meirelles' Blindness.

He was arrested by Tokyo Metropolitan Police on September 8, 2020 on suspicion of violating the cannabis possession law, and admitted to possession of cannabis for personal use.

== Filmography ==
=== Film ===
- After Life (1998) – Yusuke Iseya
- Kinpatsu no Sogen (2000)
- Harmful Insect (2001) – Coffeeshop Guy
- Distance (2001) – Enoki Masaru
- Yomigaeri (2002) – Shunsuke
- Tsuki ni Shizumu (2002)
- Dead End Run (2003)
- Kakuto (2003)
- Casshern (2004) – Tetsuya Azuma/Casshern
- What the Snow Brings (2005) – Manabu Yazaki
- The Passenger (2005) – Kohji
- Memories of Matsuko (2006) – Youichi Ryu
- Sea Without Exit (2006)
- Tekkonkinkreet (2006) – Kimura (voice)
- Warau Michael (2006) – Kazuomi Shijo
- Honey and Clover (2006) – Shinobu Morita
- Sukiyaki Western Django (2007) – Yoshitsune
- The Insects Unlisted in the Encyclopedia (2007)
- Dog in a Sidecar (2007)
- Densen Uta (2007) – Taichi
- Closed Note (2007)
- Blindness (2008) – First Blind Man
- 13 Assassins (2010) – Kiga Koyata
- The Fallen Angel (2010)
- Ashita no Joe (2011) – Tōru Rikiishi
- Kaiji 2 (2011)
- Dreams for Sale (2012)
- Land of Hope (2012) – Tanigawa
- The Tenor – Lirico Spinto (2012) – Koji Sawada
- The Kiyosu Conference (2013) – Oda Nobukane
- Ask This of Rikyu (2013) – Oda Nobunaga
- Rurouni Kenshin: Kyoto Inferno (2014) – Shinomori Aoshi
- Rurouni Kenshin: The Legend Ends (2014) – Shinomori Aoshi
- Joker Game (2015) – Yūki
- Shinjuku Swan (2015) – Mako
- Mumon: The Land of Stealth (2017) – Daizen Heki
- Shinjuku Swan II (2017) – Mako
- JoJo's Bizarre Adventure: Diamond Is Unbreakable Chapter I (2017) – Jotaro Kujo
- March Comes in Like a Lion: Part 2 (2017) – Seijirō Amaido
- Inuyashiki (2018) – Detective Hagihara
- I Love Irene (2018) – Yūjirō
- Fly Me to the Saitama (2019) – Sho Akutsu
- At the End of the Matinee (2019)
- Tonkatsu DJ Agetarō (2020) – DJ Oily
- The Devil Wears Jūnihitoe (2020) – Emperor Kiritsubo
- Rurouni Kenshin: The Final (2021) – Shinomori Aoshi
- A Morning of Farewell (2021)
- Penalty Loop (2024) – Mizoguchi

=== Television ===
- Shirasu Jiro (2009) – Jirō Shirasu
- Ryōmaden (2010) – Takasugi Shinsaku
- One no Kanata ni -Chichi to Musuko no Nikkouki Tsuiraku Jikou- (2012)
- Kuruma Isu de Boku wa Sora wo Tobu (2012)
- Onna Nobunaga (2013) – Hashiba Hideyoshi
- Hana Moyu (2015) – Yoshida Shōin
- Prison's Princess (2017) – Gorō Itabashi
- Voice: 110 Emergency Control Room (2019) – Shizuku Hongo

=== Dubbing ===
- The Little Prince (2015) – the Fox
