= The Most Terrible Time in My Life =

- Directed by: Kaizo Hayashi
- Written by: Daisuke Tengan; Kaizo Hayashi
- Produced by: Kaizo Hayashi; Shunsuke Koga; Yu Wei Yen
- Starring: Masatoshi Nagase; Akaji Maro; Haruko Wanibuchi; Hou De Jian; Housei Kondo
- Release date: 1993
- Running time: 92 minutes

The Most Terrible Time in My Life (我が人生最悪の時, Waga jinsei saiaku no toki ) is a 1993 film directed by Kaizo Hayashi. The film is the first in the series featuring the detective Mike Hama (a play on the Mickey Spillane detective Mike Hammer), which included two more films by Hayashi (Stairway to the Distant Past and The Trap), a TV series (The Private Detective Mike), and a film made from one episode of that TV series (Mike Yokohama: A Forest with No Name).

== Reception ==
At Metacritic, which assigns a rating out of 100 to reviews from mainstream critics, the film has received an average score of 61, based on 8 reviews.
