= Kabuki: Quantum Fighter =

1990 video game

- North American cover art
- Developer: Human Entertainment
- Publishers: JP: Pack-In-Video; NA: HAL Laboratory; EU: Nintendo
- Designer: Hiroyuki Ito
- Programmers: Hiroshi Haruna; Takashi Arai
- Artists: Hiroyuki Ito; Takeshi Onozaki; Kōji Tomura
- Composers: Masaki Hashimoto; Takahiro Wakuta
- Platform: Nintendo Entertainment System
- Release: JP: December 21, 1990; NA: February 1991; EU: February 20, 1992
- Genre: Platform
- Mode: Single-player

Kabuki: Quantum Fighter (Japanese: 地獄極楽丸, Hepburn: Jigoku Gokurakumaru) is a 2D platform game developed by Human Entertainment and published by HAL Laboratory for the Nintendo Entertainment System. It was originally released on December 21, 1990, in Japan and was released in January 1991 for the North American market before being released in Europe on February 20, 1992.

== Plot ==
Inside the computer

In the year 2056, a virus has appeared in the main defense computer of the planet Earth. The origin and nature are unknown. Players adopt the persona of 25-year-old Colonel Scott O'Connor, a military agent who has transferred his brain into raw binary code using experimental technology in order to combat a rogue program in the main defense computer. When O'Connor enters the system, his body forms the self-image of his great-great-grandfather, who was a kabuki actor. The virus in the virtual world takes on properties of an actual virus-it leaves behind debris, mutant creatures, and parasite environments of a biological nature. At the final level, it is revealed that the virus is of alien origin, having been picked up by the lost Hyperion probe launched to a neighboring planet. O'Connor stops it before the virus can order the Hyperion to fire its laser weapons and destroy the human population.

== Gameplay ==
The field is generally side-scrolling, with a single room with a boss at the end of each level. O'Connor uses his long hair and chip-based weaponry to attack enemies inside the computer. The chip-weaponry includes the Energy Gun, Fusion Gun, Quantum Bombs and Remote-Controlled Bolo.

== Regional differences ==
The Family Computer version was designed as a tie-in to the 1990 Kaizo Hayashi film Zipang. In this version, a fifteen-year-boy named Bobby Yano transforms into his samurai ancestor, Jigoku Gokurakumaru, and enters a supercomputer on a space station to clear it of viruses. References to the film were removed in the international releases.

== Reception ==
Reception

Review scores
Publication	Score
Computer and Video Games	82/100
Electronic Gaming Monthly	9/10, 9/10, 9/10, 9/10

Nintendo Power described the game as sci-fi action. It received a rating of 3.6 out of 5 for Graphics and Sound, 3.6 out of 5 for Play Control, 3.5 out of 5 for Challenge, and a 3.7 out of 5 for Theme and Fun.

Paul Glancey and Paul Rand of Computer and Video Games magazine gave an overall score of 82 out of 100 in their review. The reviewers praised the detailed graphics but criticized the sound. Despite some initial skepticism, they found the game enjoyable after getting used to its difficulty and peculiar storyline. The game's ratings in specific categories were as follows: 85 for graphics, 53 for sound, 79 for playability, and 84 for lastability.
