= Caterpillar (disambiguation) =

A caterpillar is the larval form of some insects.

Caterpillar, The Caterpillar or Caterpillars may also refer to:

== Arts and entertainment ==
=== Film and television ===
- Caterpillar (1988 film), a 1988 Japanese short experimental film
- Caterpillar (2010 film), a 2010 Japanese drama film
- "Caterpillars", an episode of the Teletubbies television series
- "The Caterpillar", an episode of the Night Gallery television series

=== Music ===
- Caterpillar (Elisa album), 2007
- Caterpillar (Mina album), 1991
- Caterpillar, a 2003 album by The Tokey Tones
- "The Caterpillar" (song), a 1984 song by The Cure
- "Caterpillar" (song), a 2018 song by Royce da 5'9"

=== Other entertainment ===
- Caterpillar (Alice's Adventures in Wonderland), a character in the book by Lewis Carroll
- The Caterpillar (magazine), children's poetry magazine associated with The Moth magazine
- Caterpillar (ride), an amusement ride
- Caterpillar, a clone of the Centipede arcade game

== Brands and organizations ==
- Caterpillar Club, an association of those who have parachuted from a disabled airplane
- Caterpillar Inc., a construction equipment manufacturing corporation
  - Caterpillar (boot brand), boots made under a license from Caterpillar Inc.

== Science and technology ==
- Caterpillar tree, a mathematical tree in which all leaves are connected to a central path
- Plumeria alba or caterpillar tree, a species of flowering plant
- Caterpillar drive, a method for propelling vehicles using only electric and magnetic fields with no moving parts
- Caterpillar track, a system of vehicle propulsion

== Other uses ==
- Caterpillar ridge, important in several World War I battles, especially the Battle of Hill 60
