= Takanori Jinnai =

Japanese actor, singer, and film director (born 1958)

- 陣内孝則
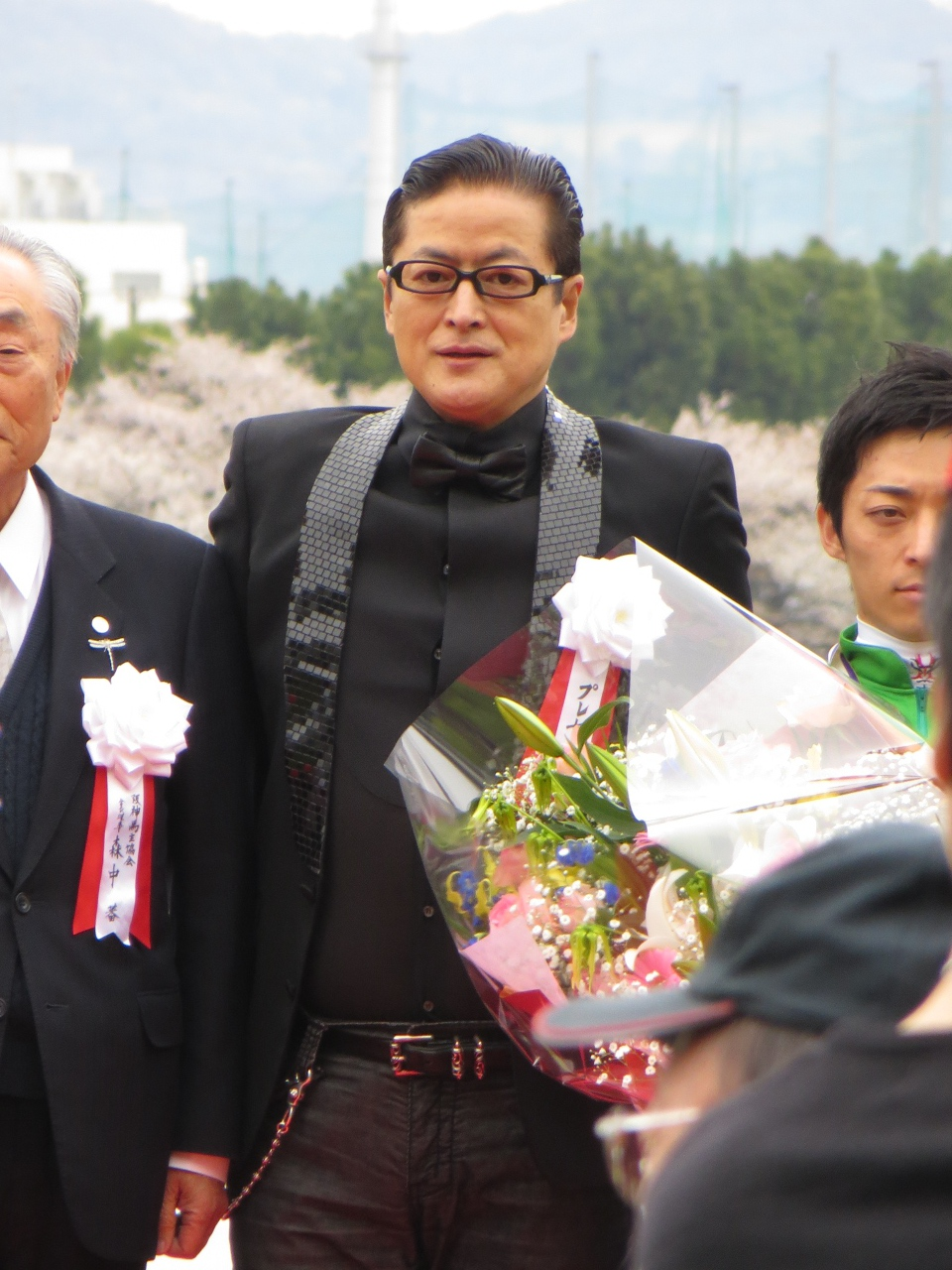
- Jinnai in 2014
- Born: August 12, 1958 (age 68); Ōkawa, Fukuoka, Japan
- Occupations: Actor; singer; director
- Years active: 1976–present
- Spouse: Eriko Akiyama (m. 1987)

Takanori Jinnai (陣内孝則, Jinnai Takanori; born August 12, 1958 in Okawa, Fukuoka) is a Japanese actor, film director, and singer. He made his directorial debut with Rockers (ロッカーズ or Rokkazu), a 2003 film based on his years as vocalist for the punk rock band The Rockers (ザ・ロッカーズ). He was nominated best actor for a Japanese Academy Award three times, once in 1988 and twice in 1989. He won the award for Best Actor at the 12th Hochi Film Awards for Chōchin.

== Filmography ==
=== Films ===
Year	Title	Role	Notes	Ref.
1982	Burst City		Lead role	
1987	Chōchin	Chiaki Mmurata	Lead role	
1989	Zatoichi	Inspector Hanshu		
2010	The Negotiator: The Movie	Keigo Kirisawa		
2012	A Sower of Seeds	Kinjiro Omiya	Lead role	
2013	Kamen Rider Wizard in Magic Land	Prime Minister Orma / Kamen Rider Sorcerer		
2019	Iwane: Sword of Serenity			
2022	Alivehoon	Ryōsuke Mutō		
2022	Haiiro no Kabe	Sugiyama		
2025	Hometown Homework	Shizuo Hiwatashi		

=== Dramas ===
Year	Title	Role	Notes	Ref.
1987	Dokuganryū Masamune	Toyotomi Hidetsugu	Taiga drama	
1989	Aishiatterukai!	Ippei	Lead role	
1991	Taiheiki	Sasaki Dōyō	Taiga drama	
1997	Mōri Motonari	Sue Harukata	Taiga drama	
1999	Tengoku ni Ichiban Chikai Otoko (Heaven Cannot Wait)	Yoshimi Tendo		
2000	Kabachitare!	Isamu Ono		
2005	1 Litre of Tears	Ikeuchi Mizuo		
2014	Gunshi Kanbei	Ukita Naoie	Taiga drama	
2016	Shizumanu Taiyō	Sōsuke Iwagō		
2020	Awaiting Kirin	Imai Sōkyū	Taiga drama	
2023	Fixer	Yūsaku Ōizumi		
2024	Ōoku	Tayasu Munetake	Special appearance	

=== TV movies ===
Year	Title	Role	Notes	Ref.
2006	Detective Conan: Shinichi Kudo's Written Challenge	Kogoro Mouri	Live-action special	
2007	Shinichi Kudo Returns! Showdown with the Black Organization	Kogoro Mouri	Live-action special	
2007	1 Litre of Tears: Memories	Ikeuchi Mizuo		
2011	Shinichi Kudo's Written Challenge! The Mystery of the Legendary Strange Bird	Kogoro Mouri	Live-action special	
2012	Shinichi Kudo and the Kyoto Shinsengumi Murder Case	Kogoro Mouri	Live-action special	

=== As director and writer ===
Year	Title	Notes	Credited as	Cast
2003	Rockers	Film	Director writer	Katsuya Kobayashi; Ryunosuke Kamiki; Yumi Asō
2007	Smile	Film	Director writer	Mirai Moriyama; Rosa Kato; Yoshiko Tanaka
2016	Kōfuku no Alibi	Film	Director	Kiichi Nakai; Tae Kimura; Toshirō Yanagiba
