= Tomoka Kurotani =

Japanese actress (born 1975)

- 黒谷友香
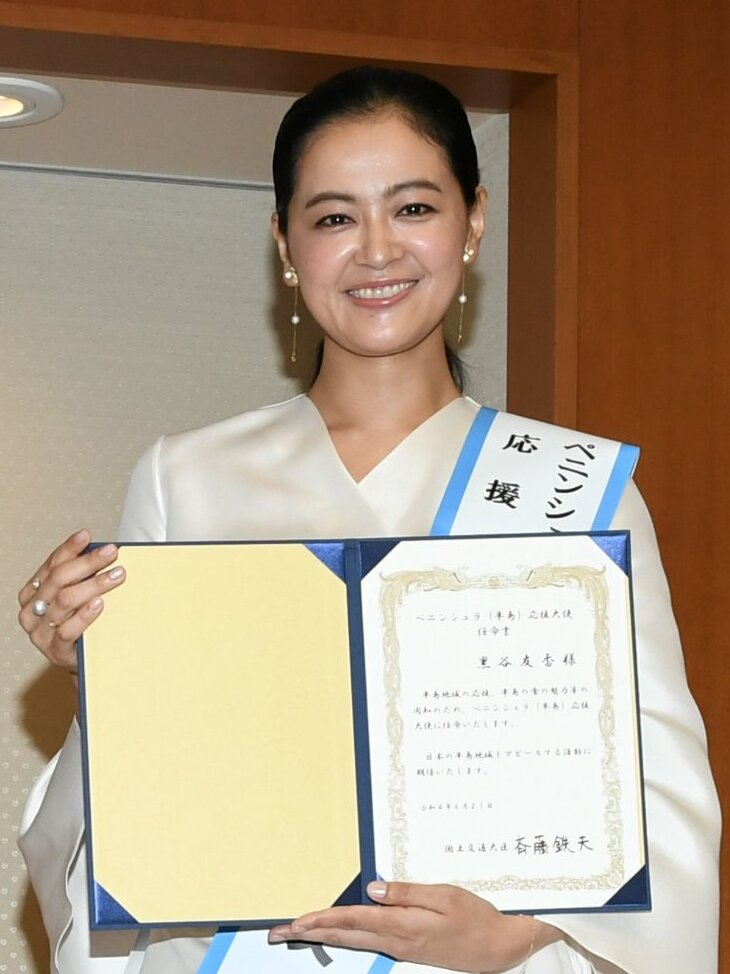
- Kurotani in 2022
- Born: December 11, 1975 (age 50); Sakai, Osaka Prefecture, Japan
- Occupation: Actress
- Years active: 1995–present
- Agent: Space Craft

Tomoka Kurotani (黒谷友香, Kurotani Tomoka; born December 11, 1975) is a Japanese actress. She starred as the femme fatale female ninja Kagero in Shinobi Heart Under Blade.

== Partial filmography ==
=== Films ===
- Boxer Joe (1995)
- Innocent Hearts (1997)
- Labyrinth of Dreams (1997)
- Samurai Resurrection (2003)
- The Battling Angel (2003)
- Quill (2004)
- Shinobi (2005)
- Ask This of Rikyu (2013), Hosokawa Gracia
- Unsung Hero (2014)
- Daughters (2020)
- Inori (2021)
- Gorilla Hall (2025)
- Godmother: Life of Ayako Koshino (2025), Hiroko Koshino
- Tsuki no Inu (2026), Saori
- Chaser Game W: A Match Made in Heaven (2026)

=== Television ===
- Eternal Child (Yomiuri TV, 2000)
- Doremisora (TBS, 2002)
- Carnation (NHK, 2011)
- Midnight Diner (MBS, 2011)
- Erased (Netflix, 2017)
