= Konsento =

2001 film by Shun Nakahara

- DVD cover
- Directed by: Shun Nakahara
- Screenplay by: Satoko Okudera
- Story by: Randy Taguchi
- Based on: Konsento by Randy Taguchi
- Produced by: Yasuhiko Higashi; Atsushi Watanabe; Takeshi Kubota; Miyuki Satô
- Starring: Miwako Ichikawa; Miho Tsumiki; Houka Kinoshita
- Cinematography: Shôgo Ueno
- Edited by: Toshihide Fukano
- Music by: Yoshihide Ôtomo
- Distributed by: Office Shirous; Media Box
- Release date: February 2, 2002 (Japan)
- Running time: 113 minutes
- Country: Japan
- Language: Japanese

Konsento (Japanese: コンセント), also known as Concent or Power Point, is a 2002 Japanese thriller film directed by Shun Nakahara. It is based on the bestselling novel of the same title by Randy Taguchi.

== Cast ==
- Miwako Ichikawa as Yuki Asakura
- Miho Tsumiki as Ritsuko
- Houka Kinoshita as Takayuki Asakura
- Masahiko Akuta as Dr. Kunisada
- Mantarô Koichi as Yamagishi
- Jun Murakami as Jun Murakami
