= Rockers (2003 film) =

- Directed by: Takanori Jinnai
- Written by: Takanori Jinnai
- Starring: Yumi Asō; Ryūnosuke Kamiki; Katsuya Kobayashi; Hakuryu; Hanawa; Hiroko Isayama; Toru Kazama; Yutaka Matsushige; Kōichi Satō
- Distributed by: Gaga Communications
- Release date: 27 September 2003
- Running time: 105 min
- Language: Japanese

Rockers (ロッカーズ, Rokkāzu) is a 2003 Japanese comedy drama directed by Takanori Jinnai. It is a fictional account of real-life Japanese rock band, The Rockers.

== Cast ==
- Yumi Asō
- Ryūnosuke Kamiki
- Katsuya Kobayashi
- Hiroko Isayama
- Toru Kazama
- Yutaka Matsushige
- Kōichi Satō
- Hakuryu
- Hanawa
