= S-94 (film) =

- Directed by: Shozin Fukui
- Written by: Shozin Fukui
- Release date: 2009
- Running time: 30 minutes
- Country: Japan

S-94 is a 2009 science fiction/horror short film by Japanese filmmaker Shozin Fukui. The film is set in a post-apocalyptic future where a deadly virus has brought humankind to the brink of extinction. Largely set within a subterranean bunker and filmed in monochrome, the film is visually reminiscent of Fukui's previous feature Rubber's Lover.

== Plot ==
2010, Japan. A virus has exterminated the entire population and only few managed to survive. Two women, Mai and Ice, live in a secluded underground bunker: the former is hopeful for the future, and hopes to carry on the species, while the latter is suicidal but too afraid to die on her own, so she tries to kill Mai along with herself.

After Mai finds Ice laying unconscious after a suicide attempt, she attempts to communicate with the external world through a radio station, hoping that someone answers their call for help. The duo fights and Ice attempts to kill both with the tube of a gas mask.

A man responds to the radio communication and is then picked up by Mai: his name is Shuma and he has the antibodies necessary to survive in the open air without dying. He is brought to the underground shelter, and Ice, resentful towards Mai's actions, initiates sex with Shuma with the intent of murdering him. She does so, and also kills Mai after. Ice finds herself surrounded by shirtless men in the bunker, and Shuma suddenly jumps at her, yelling that those are "the new types". Ice is then cannibalized by the men, and the film ends.

== Cast ==
- Nozomi Hazuki as Mai
- Yûya Ishikawa as Shuma
- Yuko Tatsushima as Ice
