= Zoo (2005 film) =

- Promotional release poster
- Directed by: Ryu Kaneda; Masaki Adachi; Masatetsu Komiya; Junpei Mizusaki; Hiroshi Ando
- Written by: Otsuichi
- Starring: Patrick Harlan; Yui Ichikawa; Ryūnosuke Kamiki; Ryoko Kobayashi; Miyuki Matsuda; Sakamatsu Mei; Atsushi Murakami; Katō Rubi; Kenta Suga; Tetta Sugimoto; Kyōka Suzuki; Jun Murakami; Akane Hamasaki
- Release date: 19 March 2005
- Running time: 120 minutes
- Country: Japan
- Language: Japanese

Zoo (ズー) is a 2005 Japanese horror anthology film directed by Ryu Kaneda and written by Otsuichi, based on the latter's Zoo series of short stories. The film stars Patrick Harlan, Yui Ichikawa, Ryūnosuke Kamiki, Ryōko Kobayashi and Miyuki Matsuda in the lead roles.

== Cast ==
=== Kazari and Yoko ===
- Ryoko Kobayashi
- Miyuki Matsuda
- Kazuko Yoshiyuki
- Hoka Kinoshita

=== Seven Rooms ===
- Yui Ichikawa
- Kenta Suga
- Saeko
- Patrick Harlan
- Hitomi Sato
- Haruka Kinami
- Ayano Nakamura
- Asami Higashiyama
- Mayui Takahashi
- Yuriko Yoshitaka

=== So-Far (So fa) ===
- Ryūnosuke Kamiki
- Anju Suzuki
- Tetta Sugimoto
- Kotaro Shiga
- Takeo Yamakawa

=== When the Sun Shines (Hidamari no shi) ===
- Kasumi Suzuki
- Ryu Suwaru

=== ZOO ===
- Jun Murakami
- Akane Hamasaki
