= Shinobi: Heart Under Blade =

- Theatrical release poster
- Directed by: Ten Shimoyama
- Screenplay by: Kenya Hirata
- Based on: The Kouga Ninja Scrolls by Futaro Yamada
- Starring: Yukie Nakama; Joe Odagiri; Tomoka Kurotani; Erika Sawajiri
- Cinematography: Masashi Chikamori
- Edited by: Isao Kawase
- Music by: Tarō Iwashiro; Ayumi Hamasaki
- Production companies: Yomiuri Telecasting Corporation; Eisei Gekijo; Nippon Television Network Corporation
- Distributed by: Shochiku
- Release date: September 15, 2005 (Japan)
- Running time: 97 minutes
- Country: Japan
- Language: Japanese
- Box office: $11,987,868

Shinobi: Heart Under Blade is a 2005 Japanese romantic drama film directed by Ten Shimoyama and written by Kenya Hirata. It is an adaptation of Futaro Yamada's novel The Kouga Ninja Scrolls, although the characters are highly altered. It depicts the clash between two ninja clans, Iga and Kouga, and the fated love between Gennosuke (Kouga) and Oboro (Iga). The film's theme song was "Heaven" by Ayumi Hamasaki.

The film was released by Shochiku on September 15, 2005. On February 6, 2007, Funimation released the film on home video in North America. The DVD is a 2-disc set with the main movie available in Japanese and an English dub. The second disc contains special features and making-ofs, with English subtitles available for all special features.

== Plot ==
Set immediately after the Japanese Sengoku period, Iga and Kouga, two mercenary clans have been waging a vendetta against each other over hundreds of years. Around 1614, Tokugawa Ieyasu, the ruler of Japan and the founder of the Tokugawa Shogunate, perceives the threat posed by the two clans. Attempting to consolidate his reign, he deliberately stirs up their feud by inviting the clans to choose their five best warriors to fight to the death. Designated as the leaders of the two clans respectively, Kouga Gennosuke (Joe Odagiri) and Oboro (Yukie Nakama), who have secretly married, are unwillingly embroiled in the political plot. Hence, they have to make a difficult decision.

Initially, being peaceful and knowing the preciousness of life, they try their utmost to prevent this meaningless and brutal fight by questioning the shogunate's motives. After the deaths of all their comrades, however, they gradually accept their fate. In the last fight, Kouga Gennosuke chooses not to defend himself and allows his lover Oboro to kill him, thus letting the clan of Iga "win". Meanwhile, Ieyasu sends his armies to exterminate the ninja villages. To accomplish Gennosuke's hope of saving them, Oboro implores Tokugawa Ieyasu not to destroy the villages and, as a show of her sincerity, blinds herself, thereby destroying her most powerful weapons, her eyes (which possess a deadly technique called "Piercing Eyes" (破幻之瞳, "Hagen no Dō" lit. "the pupil of annihilation"). Moved profoundly by Oboro, Ieyasu withdraws his armies and issues an injunction to protect the ninja villages. For generations hence, the villages live peacefully.

== Cast ==
The list of six top ninja of Iga and Kouga, along with other characters.

Kouga

- Joe Odagiri as Kouga Gennosuke - the Kouga leader with the power to see, react, and move at very high speeds.
- Takeshi Masu as Muroga Hyouma - has abilities similar to a 6th sense (sensing enemies kilometers away).
- Mitsuki Koga as Chikuma Koshirou - no supernatural powers, best weapons user.
- Tomoka Kurotani as Kagero - poison specialist. Poison flows within her veins and she is able to breathe poison at enemies or poisoning them with a kiss.
- Houka Kinoshita as Kisaragi Saemon - he is able to assume the physical appearance of others and imitate their voice.
- Minoru Terada as Kouga Danjo

Iga

- Yukie Nakama as Oboro - the Iga leader who has the "eyes of destruction", completely incapacitating an opponent with one glance.
- Kippei Shiina as Yakushiji Tenzen - he is the host to parasitic worms which prevent him from aging and heal any wounds he sustained, allowing him to quickly recover from nearly any injury.
- Tak Sakaguchi as Yashamaru - he manipulates thin wires, using them like whips. The wires are also sharp enough to cut through various objects.
- Shun Ito as Mino Nenki - beastman that has a keen sense of smell
- Erika Sawajiri as Hotarubi - she uses some sort of dust that manipulates butterflies and moths.
- Lily as Ogen

Others

- Takeshi Masu as Kuroga Hyouma
- Masaki Nishina as Yagyū Jūbei Mitsuyoshi
- Toshiya Nagasawa as Yagyū Munenori
- Yutaka Matsushige as Hattori Hanzō
- Renji Ishibashi as Nankōbō Tenkai
- Kazuo Kitamura as Tokugawa Ieyasu

== Reception ==
The film was successful financially in Japan earning roughly 11 million US dollars. Shinobi won both best actor and best new actress awards at both the Kinema Junpo Awards and Yokohama Film Festival.
