= Gerorisuto =

- Directed by: Shozin Fukui
- Release date: 1986
- Running time: 12 minutes
- Country: Japan

Gerorisuto (ゲロリスト) is a 1986 short experimental film by Japanese underground filmmaker Shozin Fukui. The film follows a young woman on the Tokyo subway, who may be possessed.

== Release ==
Despite being originally made in 1986, Gerorisuto was not officially released in Japan until the early 1990s.

The film appeared in the United States as a special feature on the Unearthed Films DVD release of Fukui's Rubber's Lover in 2004. The DVD has since been discontinued.
