= Bakugyaku Familia =

Japanese manga series

莫逆家族 (Bakugyaku Kazoku)
- Manga
- Written by: Hiroshi Tanaka
- Published by: Kodansha
- Magazine: Weekly Young Magazine
- Original run: 1999 – 2004
- Volumes: 11
- Live-action film
- Directed by: Kazuyoshi Kumakiri
- Written by: Takashi Ujida
- Released: March 30, 2012

Bakugyaku Familia (莫逆家族, Bakugyaku Kazoku; "Cordial Family") is a Japanese manga series by Hiroshi Tanaka. It was adapted into a live action film in 2012.

== Cast ==
- Yoshimi Tokui as Tetsu
- Kento Hayashi as Shuhei
- Sadao Abe
- Tetsuji Tamayama
- Nao Ōmori
- Kazuki Kitamura
- Arata Iura
- Mitsuko Baisho
- Kento Ayashi
- Hirofumi Arai
- Jun Murakami
