= Jun Murakami =

Japanese actor

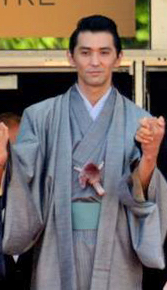
- Murakami at the 2014 Cannes Film Festival.
- Born: July 23, 1973 (age 52); Osaka Prefecture, Japan
- Occupation: Actor
- Agent: Decade
- Spouse: Ua (m. 1996; div. 2006)
- Children: Nijirō Murakami

Jun Murakami (村上 淳, Murakami Jun; born July 23, 1973) is a Japanese actor.

== Career ==
Murakami starred in Sho Miyake's Playback (2012). He co-starred in Sion Sono's The Land of Hope (2012) with Megumi Kagurazaka.

He has also appeared in films such as Takahisa Zeze's Heaven's Story and Gakuryu Ishii's Isn't Anyone Alive?.

== Filmography ==
=== Film ===
- Bounce Ko Gals (1997)
- Nabbie's Love (1999)
- Shiki-Jitsu (2000)
- New Battles Without Honor and Humanity (2000)
- Stereo Future (2001)
- Konsento (2001)
- Red Shadow (2001)
- Konsento (2001)
- Blue (2002)
- Border Line (2002)
- Filament (2002)
- Desert Moon (2003)
- Out of This World (2004)
- Cutie Honey (2004)
- 69 (2004)
- Into a Dream (2005)
- Zoo (2005)
- Nanayo (2008)
- Michiko & Hatchin (2008)
- Sweet Rain: Accuracy of Death (2008)
- Counterfeit Bills (2009)
- Zen (2009)
- Nonchan Noriben (2009)
- The Lightning Tree (2010)
- Heaven's Story (2010)
- Sketches of Kaitan City (2010)
- Sword of Desperation (2010)
- The Egoists (2011)
- Yakuza Weapon (2011)
- Dog Police (2011)
- The Depths (2011)
- Isn't Anyone Alive? (2012)
- Himizu (2012)
- Our Homeland (2012)
- A Road Stained Crimson (2012)
- Bakugyaku Familia (2012)
- Playback (2012)
- The Land of Hope (2012)
- A Woman and War (2013)
- Crying 100 Times: Every Raindrop Falls (2013)
- Still the Water (2014)
- Kabukicho Love Hotel (2014)
- The Sun (2016)
- Shinjuku Swan II (2017)
- Policeman and Me (2017)
- Moon and Lightning (2017)
- Dynamite Graffiti (2018)
- My Friend "A" (2018)
- It's Boring Here, Pick Me Up (2018), Suga
- 21st Century Girl (2019)
- Aircraft Carrier Ibuki (2019), Kazuhisa Nakane
- According to Our Butler (2019)
- We Are Little Zombies (2019), Rintaro Takemura
- First Love (2019), Ichikawa
- They Say Nothing Stays the Same (2019)
- Silent Rain (2019)
- Nōten Paradise (2020)
- Mio's Cookbook (2020)
- A Girl on the Shore (2021)
- Every Trick in the Book (2021), Yamashita
- Owari ga Hajimari (2021)
- Shimamori (2022), Taizō Arai
- Pure Japanese (2022)
- Tombi: Father and Son (2022), Murata
- You've Got a Friend (2022), Yoshio Yoshida
- Silent Parade (2022)
- Hell Dogs (2022)
- 2 Women (2022)
- My (K)night (2023)
- Sin and Evil (2024), Shimizu
- Seaside Serendipity (2025)
- Busshi (2026), Kazunari Kondo
- Bad Lieutenant: Tokyo (2026)

=== Television ===
- Yae's Sakura (2013), Hijikata Toshizō
- Silver and Gold (2017), Masashi Funada
- Bullets, Bones and Blocked Noses (2021)
- The Queen of Villains (2024), Takashi Matsunaga

== Notes ==
He is not to be confused with Japanese stunt actor Jun Murakami.
