= The Rockers (band) =

Japanese punk rock band

- Origin: Hakata, Fukuoka, Japan
- Genres: Punk
- Years active: 1976
- Publisher: Canyon Records
- Past members: Takanori Jinnai; Jun Hashimoto; Takashi Tsukamoto; Shunsuke Nakamura; Hiroshi Tamaki

The Rockers (ザ・ロッカーズ, Rokkazu, stylized as TH eROCKERS) were a Japanese punk band formed in 1976 in Hakata, Fukuoka. They were a five-piece band which recorded three albums between 1980 and 1982 (Who, Come On, and Shakin) under Canyon Records. They belonged to the so-called Mentai Rock scene.

Their frontman, Takanori Jinnai, went on to have a two-decade acting career, winning Best Actor accolades at the Japanese Academy Awards twice. In 2001, he became a film director.

They were featured in the film Rockers (2003 film) by directed by Takanori Jinnai which recorded the spirit and energy of the early Japanese punk movement, the band splitting up soon after filming was completed. In 2014, the band reformed for the memorial concert of former bassist Jun Hashimoto and started to play irregularly later on. In 2018, Takanori Jinnai and a mostly new line-up began working on new material, and eventually they released a new album, Rock'n Roll in 2019.

== Members ==
- Takanori Jinnai
- Ko-chan (Takashi Tsukamoto)
- Jin (Shunsuke Nakamura)
- Tani (Hiroshi Tamaki)

== Films ==
- Rockers
- Burst City (1982) by Sogo Ishii
- アイデン & ティティ (2004) by Tomorowo Taguchi (田口トモロヲ)
