= Labyrinth of Dreams (film) =

1997 film

- DVD cover
- Directed by: Gakuryū Ishii
- Written by: Gakuryū Ishii
- Based on: Yume no ginga by Kyuusaku Yumeno
- Produced by: Kazuo Suzaki; Yasuhiro Itō; Atsuyuki Shimoda; Kenichi Kamata; Satoshi Kanno
- Starring: Rena Komine; Tadanobu Asano; Kotomi Kyono; Tomoka Kurotani; Kirina Mano
- Cinematography: Norimichi Kasamatsu
- Edited by: Kan Suzuki
- Music by: Hiroyuki Onogawa
- Release date: 15 February 1997 (Japan)
- Running time: 90 minutes
- Country: Japan
- Language: Japanese

Labyrinth of Dreams (Japanese: ユメノ銀河, Hepburn: Yume no ginga) is a 1997 Japanese mystery film directed by Gakuryū Ishii. It was screened in the Contemporary World Cinema section of the 1997 Toronto International Film Festival. The movie is based on a novel by Kyuusaku Yumeno.

== Cast ==
- Rena Komine as Tomiko Tomonari
- Tadanobu Asano as Tatsuo Niitaka
- Kotomi Kyono as Chieko Yamashita
- Tomoka Kurotani as Tsuyako Tukikawa
- Kirina Mano as Aiko
- Shūko Honami
- Reiko Matsuo as Mineko Matsuura
