= Shozin Fukui =

Japanese film director and screenwriter (1961–2026)

- 福居ショウジン
- Born: 29 July 1961; Japan
- Died: 2 April 2026 (aged 64)
- Occupations: Film director, screenwriter
- Years active: 1984–2026
- Movement: Japanese cyberpunk
- Website: http://www.honekoubou.jp/

Shozin Fukui (福居ショウジン, Fukui Shōjin; 29 July 1961 – 2 April 2026) was a Japanese film director and screenwriter. He was best known for his contributions to the cyberpunk genre.

== Life and career ==
While attending university, Fukui worked for a video company shooting live performances. During this time he produced three short films: Chaser of the Ranger, Scourge of Blood and Metal Days.

In total: Fukui produced six experimental shorts—Scourge of Blood, Metal Days, Gerorisuto, Caterpillar, S-94 and The Hiding—along with two full-length films, 964 Pinocchio (1991) and Rubber's Lover (1996). 964 Pinocchio is often compared to the cyberpunk classic Tetsuo: The Iron Man (1989) directed by Shinya Tsukamoto.

Excluding Metal Days, Fukui's films were widely available, having been issued on DVD by Unearthed Films. However, these releases have since gone out of print. Fukui has released four films since then, Onne, Den-Sen, The Hiding, and S-94.

Fukui worked as an assistant director during Tsukamoto's Tetsuo: The Iron Man. Many fans and critics consider Fukui's aesthetic to be different enough from Tsukamoto's for Fukui's films to stand on their own, even considering their thematic similarities.

Fukui died on 2 April 2026. This came shortly after his production company, Honekoubou, resumed their activity in 2025 to organize a retrospective of the director's filmography. The retrospective included two screenings of Metal Days, a film that has long been sought after by fans due to its unavailability.

== Filmography ==
Title	Year	Note
Chaser of the Ranger	Unknown	Short
Scourge of Blood	1984	Short
Metal Days	1986	Short
Gerorisuto	1986	Short
Caterpillar	1988	Short
964 Pinocchio	1991	Feature
Rubber's Lover	1996	Feature
Hentai Randō	2004	Documentary
Onne	2006	
Den-Sen	2006	
Derenai	2007	Directors cut of Onne
The Hiding	2008	
S-94	2009	
