= August in the Water =

- Original theatrical release poster
- Directed by: Gakuryū Ishii
- Written by: Gakuryū Ishii
- Produced by: Shoetsu Sato; Tetsuya Takahashi; Toshifumi Furusawa
- Starring: Rena Komine; Shinsuke Akagi; Masao Kusakari; Hideyo Amamoto
- Cinematography: Norimichi Kasamatsu
- Edited by: Hiroshi Matsuo
- Music by: Hiroyuki Nagashima; Shōzō Kashiwagi; Kenjirō Matsuo; Hiroyuki Onogawa
- Production companies: August in the Water Production Committee; Hill Villa
- Distributed by: Image Factory IM
- Release date: September 9, 1995 (Japan)
- Running time: 117 minutes
- Country: Japan
- Language: Japanese

August in the Water (Japanese: 水の中の八月, Hepburn: Mizu no naka no hachigatsu) is a 1995 supernatural science fiction drama film by Japanese director Gakuryū Ishii.

The director has cited English language science fiction authors Philip K. Dick and J. G. Ballard as inspirations for his "trippy, metaphysical" films of the 1990s, and The Japan Times' critic Mark Schilling cited this film as an example of his "poetic and spiritual films" that followed his punk films of the previous decade.

== Plot ==
Izumi Hazuki transfers to a new high school in Fukuoka, where she quickly makes friends with two boys, Mao and Ukiya. Both boys become infatuated with her, and Ukiya consults his fortune-teller friend Miki to see whether he might have a chance with her. Miki curtly informs him that their signs are not a good match. Mao and Izumi begin to steadily grow closer, spending time together as Mao rides Izumi home from her high dive training on his bicycle.

During a water-throwing festival, Miki shows Ukiya a new fortune predicting that Izumi will suffer a potentially fatal accident. Ukiya shows the fortune to Mao who initially dismisses it, but also notices that the predicted date of the accident coincides with Izumi's upcoming diving competition. Meanwhile, the city is plagued by strange events. Drought has resulted in severe water shortages, many people are afflicted by a mysterious illness that causes one's internal organs to petrify, and two meteorites land simultaneously in the mountains nearby, one of which is found and taken to an astrophysics laboratory.

At home, Izumi is shown a photographic slide of three petrographs by her older sister Yo, taken as part of her husband's research. The first carving depicts an exploding supernova, the second an evaporating stone, and the third shows a shamanic ritual, the image of which Izumi likens to a person high diving. Yo suggests that the petrographs are related to current events.

The day of Izumi's competition arrives. Mao and Ukiya watch nervously from the stands as Izumi takes her dive from the platform. As she falls, the surface of the water briefly appears to turn to stone, causing Izumi to falter and slam into the water. Mao dives into the pool and rescues her, whereupon she is rushed to the hospital. There, doctors inform her sister that she has fallen into a coma and may not survive.

Fortunately, Izumi soon regains consciousness and returns to school. However, her personality after the accident is markedly different. She talks of having a raised awareness of herself and the surrounding environment on a subatomic level and becomes increasingly preoccupied with the mountains near the city. Mao and Izumi later hike to the mountains, where they find a stone circle hidden among the trees. At the center of the circle is a large, round boulder, its surface carved with petrographs resembling those shown in Yo's husband's research.

Sometime later, Mao receives a phone call from Yo, telling him that Izumi has gone missing. While Mao looks for Izumi, the police search for a man believed to have the missing meteorite, who has murdered a scientist and stolen the second meteorite from the laboratory. Eventually, both Izumi and the man are found in the mountains, lying together on the boulder along with both meteorites. Later, under questioning by a doctor, she explains that the man is a member of a tribe of stone beings who wish to take over Earth and return it to stone and that she must take measures to prevent this from happening. The doctor suggests to Yo and Mao that Izumi may have sudden schizophrenia brought on by the shock of the diving accident. Izumi later returns to school, where rumors have spread due to a magazine article suggesting that Izumi can psychically communicate with dolphins and plants. Later, Miki shows Mao and Ukiya a historical record referring to a village being struck by a drought and a "stone disease" after the appearance of two meteorites. It also mentions that these events were only brought to an end after a person, chosen to restore balance, performed a ceremony that takes place on a full moon.

Yo collapses after contracting the petrification illness and is hospitalized. Mao meets Izumi at the hospital, where she tells him that she can not wait any longer and must take action. She leaves the hospital followed by Mao and makes her way to a nearby river. There, under the light of the full moon, Izumi psychically communicates with Mao and ruminates on why she survived the accident, before saying her goodbyes and walking into the river, eventually fading from sight. The next morning, storm clouds appear over the city as Mao makes his way to the stone circle. He is later found unconscious atop the boulder and taken to hospital, where he is diagnosed with amnesia, having lost his memory of the previous night. Rain begins to fall and the drought ends.

After the rain storm passes, many people recover from the illness. News about the petrographs and Miki's record spreads worldwide, and scholars come from various countries to study the stone circle. Mao volunteers in the study, hoping to find clues about Izumi's disappearance. He eventually became a researcher studying special remains found around the world, using a diary Izumi had kept as the basis for his studies. Years later, an elderly Mao visits the stone circle, now named the "Hazuki Circle", and lies down on the central boulder. As rain begins to fall, Izumi appears before him, unchanged in the years since her disappearance. The two embrace, and then vanish.

== Cast ==
- Rena Komine as Izumi Hazuki
- Shinsuke Aoki as Mao Kuwashima
- Reiko Matsuo as Miki
- Masaaki Takarai as Ukiya
- Naho Toda as Yo Hazuki
- Hideyo Amamoto as Sakai
- Masao Kusakari as Dolphin instructor
- Yuji Nakamura as Diving coach
- Kou Machida as Stone Tribe emissary
- Isamu Osuga as Professor Abe
- Genjiro Arato as Biology teacher
- Tetsuji Mitoma as Old fisherman

== Reception ==
Ken Eisner of Variety called it an "intriguing and self-assured exercise in style" with "wry observations about modern Japanese life [and] metaphors for a variety of current malaises, from AIDS to urban alienation".

The Embassy of Japan, London, called it "a curious mix of Japanese animism, New Age spirituality, and science fiction".

The British Film Institute listed it as one of the ten great Japanese films of the 1990s.

AllMovie gave the film three out of five stars, terming it a "coming-of-age drama cum sci-fi supernatural headtrip".

Nick Chen of Dazed described it as "both a hallucinatory analysis of coming-of-age malaise and a comforting, sumptuous visual salve for right now".

== Awards ==
- Zabaltegi Award – Best New Director, San Sebastián International Film Festival, 1998
