= Dead End Run =

- Theatrical release poster
- Directed by: Gakuryū Ishii
- Written by: Gakuryū Ishii; Junko Uratsuji
- Produced by: Yoshiya Nagasawa
- Starring: Tadanobu Asano; Yusuke Iseya; Masatoshi Nagase; Mikako Ichikawa; Jun Kunimura
- Cinematography: Masami Inomoto
- Edited by: Gakuryū Ishii; Masaki Inoue
- Music by: Hiroyuki Onogawa
- Release date: 18 October 2003 (Japan)
- Running time: 58 minutes
- Country: Japan
- Language: Japanese

Dead End Run is a 2003 film directed by Japanese cult film director Gakuryū Ishii, notable for Ishii's trademark flashy visual style.

The film has little plot to speak of, but is instead divided into three short episodes, each of which opens with a man desperately running away before being trapped in a dead end, where something out-of-the-ordinary occurs. The episodes include a musical number, a Mexican stand-off and a police pursuit.

== Plot ==
The first episode begins with an extended scene showing a man desperately running through an urban landscape, before coming to a dead end in a dark backstreet ally. When he hears approaching footsteps, he attacks his presumed pursuer with a metal bar. He is shocked to find that he has instead killed a young woman.

However, the woman comes back to life, and sings and dances with the man in the style of a musical film, telling him how they were fated to meet and how tragic it is that their love has to be so short. Once again she dies, and while the man grieves over her body, his pursuer appears and shoots him. The man's and woman's bodies lie next to each other on the tarmac.

The second episode also begins with a fleeing man who gets trapped in a dead end, where he becomes involved in a protracted Mexican stand-off with another man. The scene is intercut with a similar stand-off involving two different armed men in the same location. Both stand-offs end with the two protagonists laughing at their predicament and entering a friendly embrace, before trying to shoot the other man. All the men receive gunshot wounds and die, their bodies falling in positions similar to the couple in the first episode of the film.

The third episode starts with three police officers chasing a suspect. The suspect flees to the top of a tall building, where a young woman is sitting. The edge of the roof is, in effect, a dead end. The suspect takes the woman hostage. After a stand-off, she manages to take the suspect's gun, and to everyone's surprise points it at her own head, threatening suicide. When the suspect tries to knock the gun out of her hand, they fall together from the roof. Although they expect to die, they actually land in a lorry carrying a cargo of feathers. The episode ends with the couple lying together in a similar physical position to the couples in the previous episodes, except that this time both characters are still alive.

== Cast ==
- Tadanobu Asano
- Yusuke Iseya
- Masatoshi Nagase
- Mikako Ichikawa
- Jun Kunimura
