= Isn't Anyone Alive? =

- DVD cover
- Directed by: Gakuryū Ishii
- Written by: Shiro Maeda
- Based on: Ikiteiru mono wa inai no ka (play) by Shiro Maeda
- Starring: Shota Sometani; Rin Takanashi; Mai Takahashi; Jun Murakami
- Cinematography: Yoshiyuki Matsumoto
- Edited by: Gakuryū Ishii; Toshihiko Takeda
- Production company: Dragon Mountain
- Distributed by: Phantom Films
- Release date: February 18, 2012 (Japan)
- Running time: 113 minutes
- Country: Japan
- Language: Japanese

Isn't Anyone Alive? (Japanese: 生きているものはいないのか, Hepburn: Ikiteiru mono wa inai no ka) is a 2012 Japanese film directed by Gakuryū Ishii (credited in his previous films as Sōgo Ishii). It features an ensemble cast including Shota Sometani and is based on the play of the same name by Shiro Maeda. Playwright Shoji Kokami has referred to the story as an outstanding example of the study of dying in the Theatre of the Absurd. It was released in Japan on February 18, 2012 and was featured at the Edinburgh International Film Festival in June 2012.

== Plot ==
The film follows 18 individuals in separate but sometimes related groups on the campus of a Japanese university hospital. These groups include a mother and father of an unborn child; a group of friends during a dance rehearsal; staff at the university hospital and a team of students researching urban legends. Ostensibly, the plot is concerned with a mysterious outbreak resembling a viral pandemic which causes the film's protagonists to suddenly die one-by-one. It is suggested during the film that this is due to secret experiments being conducted by the United States Armed Forces in the hospital. However, rather than attempting to resolve the mystery of the outbreak, the focus of the film is largely devoted to the relationships between the characters and their reactions to their own and each other's impending deaths. Ishii has stated the film is made to show the absurdity of the characters not knowing when or why their deaths will occur and highlights the importance of drama and dialogue within the film, in contrast to his previous works.

== Cast ==
- Shota Sometani as Keisuke
- Rin Takanashi as Ryoko
- Mai Takahashi as Nana
- Jun Murakami as Yama-san
- Hakka Shiraishi as Kaori

== Reception ==
In a review for the website efilmcritic.com, Jay Seaver gives the film 3 stars out of 5, highlighting the strong performance of the cast but noting that ultimately the conceptual tone is difficult to sustain for the duration of the film.
