= Masatoshi Nagase =

Japanese actor

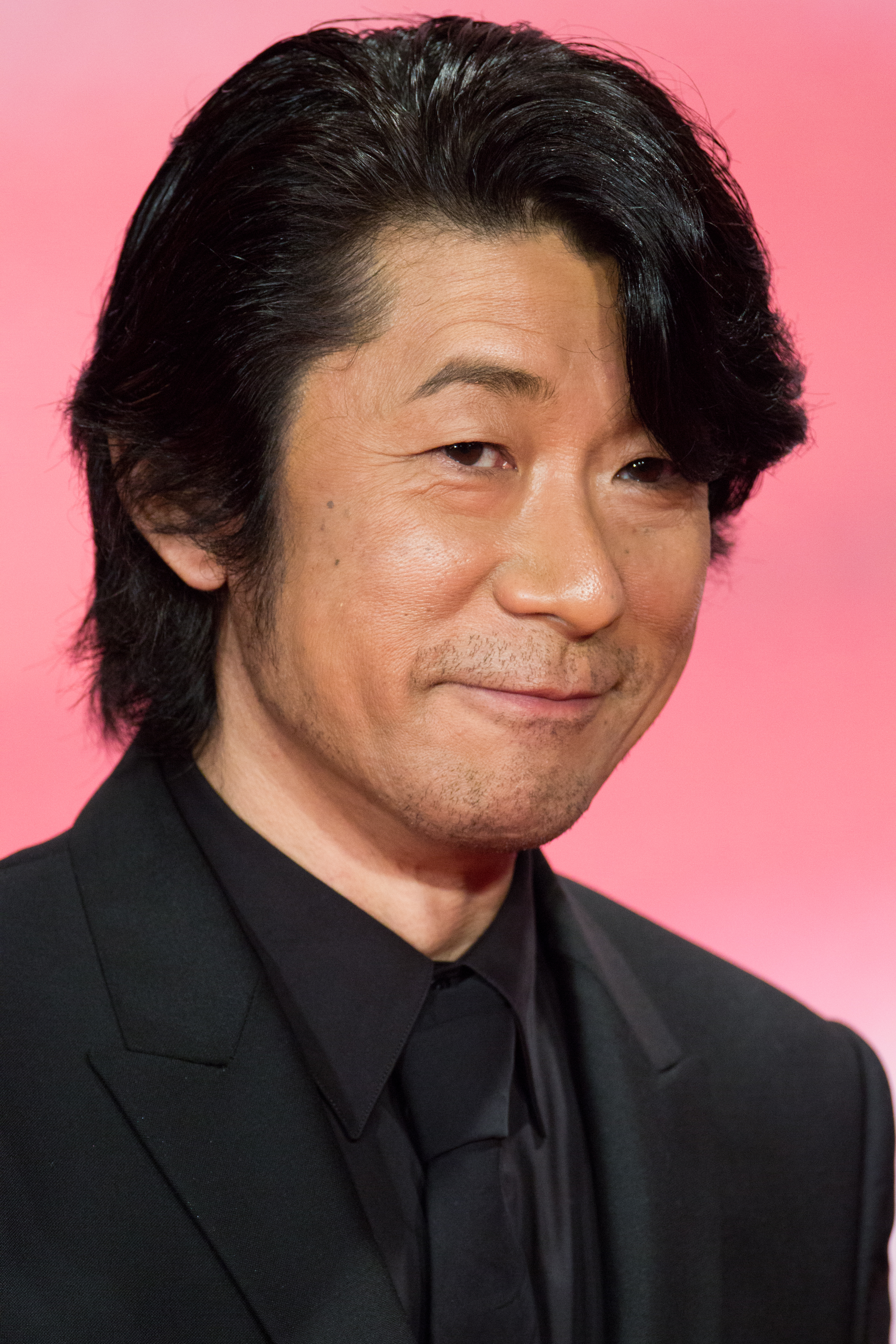
- Nagase at Opening Ceremony of the Tokyo International Film Festival, 2017.
- Born: July 15, 1966 (age 60); Miyakonojō, Miyazaki, Japan
- Occupations: Actor, singer
- Years active: 1983–present
- Spouse: Kyōko Koizumi (m. 1995; div. 2004)

Masatoshi Nagase (永瀬 正敏, Nagase Masatoshi; born July 15, 1966) is a Japanese actor and singer. He is best known in the West for his roles in Friðrik Þór Friðriksson's Cold Fever and Jim Jarmusch's Mystery Train.

Nagase was described by Todd Brown of Twitch Film as "one of the great unsung heroes of Japanese film, a hugely reliable character actor with seemingly unerring taste in projects who - despite a huge body of work - remains largely unknown by name."

== Career ==
Nagase co-starred in Jim Jarmusch's Mystery Train (1989) with Youki Kudoh. He has starred in films such as Sion Sono's Suicide Club (2001), Shinji Aoyama's Mike Yokohama: A Forest with No Name (2002), and Yoji Yamada's The Hidden Blade (2004).

== Filmography ==
=== Film ===
- P.P. Rider (1983)
- Miyuki (1983), Masato Wakamatsu
- Mystery Train (1989)
- Bakayarou! 3: Hen na Yatsura (1990)
- My Sons (1991)
- Autumn Moon (1992)
- Tora-San Makes Excuses
- Original Sin (1992)
- The Most Terrible Time in My Life (1993)
- Outobai Shoujo (1994)
- The Stairway to the Distant Past (1994)
- Powder Road (1994)
- Cold Fever (1995)
- Flirt (1995)
- Berlin (1995)
- Trap (1996)
- Gakko II (1996)
- Niji o Tsukamu Otoko (1996)
- Ullie (1996)
- Abduction (1997)
- Beautiful Sunday (1998)
- Three Businessmen (1998)
- Gojoe (2000)
- Party 7 (2000)
- A Closing Day (2000)
- Electric Dragon 80.000 V (2001)
- Chloe (2001)
- Luxurious Bone (2001)
- Pistol Opera (2001)
- Stereo Future (2001)
- Suicide Club (2002)
- Getting Wild with Our Monkey (2002)
- Mike Yokohama: A Forest with No Name (2002)
- The Sea Is Watching (2002)
- Dead End Run (2003)
- The Loved Gun (2004)
- The Hidden Blade (2004)
- Gina K (2005)
- Ubume no Natsu (2005)
- The Blossoming of Kamiya Etsuko (2006)
- Sakuran (2006)
- Funuke Show Some Love, You Losers! (2007)
- Dreaming Awake (2008)
- R246 Story (2008)
- Gelatin Silver, Love (2009)
- Kaasan, Mom's Life (2011)
- Smuggler (2011)
- The Sea Is Watching (2012)
- A Road Stained Crimson (2012)
- A Woman and War (2013)
- Kano (2014) – Hyōtarō Kondō
- Sweet Bean (2015)
- Black Widow Business (2016) – Honda
- Jūjika (2016) – Shunsuke's father
- Happiness (2016) – Kanzaki
- 64: Part I (2016)
- 64: Part II (2016)
- Paterson (2016)
- Radiance (2017)
- The Blue Hearts (2017)
- Red Snow (2018)
- Vision (2018)
- Butterfly Sleep (2018)
- Punk Samurai Slash Down (2018)
- Talking the Pictures (2019)
- We Are Little Zombies (2019)
- Love's Twisting Path (2019)
- Hotel New Moon (2019)
- They Say Nothing Stays the Same (2019)
- The First Supper (2019)
- Fancy (2020)
- Sakura (2020) – Akio Hasegawa
- Just the Two of Us (2020)
- Under the Stars (2020)
- Living in the Sky (2020)
- Bolt (2020)
- Tracing Her Shadow (2020)
- Malu (2020)
- A Day with No Name (2021)
- A Madder Red (2021) – Nakamura
- Hotel Iris (2021)
- Noise (2022)
- Just Remembering (2022) – Jun
- A Hundred Flowers (2022)
- The Three Sisters of Tenmasou Inn (2022) – Kiyoshi Ogawa
- Brats, Be Ambitious! (2023) – Makio
- Mountain Woman (2023)
- Goldfish (2023) – Ichi
- Jigen Daisuke (2023) – Takeshi Kawashima
- Family (2023)
- Last Shadow at First Light (2023)
- Daisuke Jigen (2023)
- The Box Man (2024)
- Adabana (2024)
- Gosh!! (2025)
- Kokuho (2025) – Gongorō Tachibana
- I Live in Fear (2025)
- Hokusai's Daughter (2025) – Hokusai
- Yakushima's Illusion (2026)
- Numb (2025) – Ohara

=== Television ===
- Abunai Deka (1987)
- Waru (1992)
- The Private Detective Mike (2002) – Mike Hama
- Bullets, Bones and Blocked Noses (2021)

== Awards ==
- 1992: 16th Elan d'or Awards - Newcomer of the Year
- 1992: 15th Japan Academy Film Prize - Best Supporting Actor and Best Newcomer (My Sons)
- 2008: 29th Yokohama Film Festival - Best Supporting Actor (Funuke Show Some Love, You Losers!)
- 2010: Japanese Film Critics Awards - Best Actor (Mainichi Kaasan)
- 2016: 37th Yokohama Film Festival - Best Actor (An)
- 2022: Nippon Connection - Nippon Honor Award
