= Angel Dust (film) =

1994 film by Gakuryū Ishii

- Theatrical release poster
- Directed by: Gakuryū Ishii
- Written by: Gakuryū Ishii; Yorozu Ikuta
- Produced by: Kenzo Horikoshi; Eiji Izumi; Taro Maki
- Starring: Kaho Minami; Takeshi Wakamatsu; Etsushi Toyokawa; Ryoko Takizawa; Masayuki Shionoya; Toshinori Kondo; Yukio Yamato; Jin Nakayama; Tomorowo Taguchi
- Cinematography: Norimichi Kasamatsu
- Edited by: Gakuryū Ishii; Hiroshi Matsuo
- Music by: Hiroyuki Nagashima
- Production company: Twins Japan
- Distributed by: Eurospace
- Release date: 23 September 1994
- Running time: 117 minutes
- Country: Japan
- Language: Japanese

Angel Dust (Japanese: エンジェル・ダスト, romanized: Enjeru dasuto) is a 1994 Japanese psychological crime horror film co-written and directed by Gakuryū Ishii. It stars Kaho Minami as a forensic psychiatrist who is brought in by the police to help stop a serial killer who strikes on a crowded Tokyo subway once a week.

The film has received positive reviews, with praise for its direction, cinematography, musical score, and performances.

== Plot ==
Forensic psychiatrist Dr. Setsuko Suma is enlisted by the Tokyo Metropolitan Police Department to assist in solving a case of serial murders occurring on the Tokyo subway. During the last two Mondays, at 6 pm, a seemingly random young woman had been killed on a crowded train—injected with a hypodermic needle containing deadly rhodotoxin. Setsuko is an expert in abnormal criminal cases with the ability to assimilate the thoughts and emotions of perpetrators by interacting with the bodies of the victims. After examining the bodies, she believes that they were chosen because they had strong feelings of self-destruction and isolation—emotions that they shared with the killer.

Setsuko suspects that the killer personally knew the first victim, a student named Yumiko, as she was the only one who was injected in the back instead of in the front. She learns that Yumiko was a former member of a cult called the Ultimate Truth Church and that she was deprogrammed at a mountain facility called the Re-Freezing Psychorium. The facility is run by disgraced psychiatrist Dr. Rei Aku, who is Setsuko's former lover. Aku's "reverse brainwashing" techniques have attracted controversy, being compared to mind control. Setsuko visits Aku to ask for information on Yumiko, but he rebuffs her.

The murders now take place outside the subway system, on residential streets and in urban areas. Setsuko begins to feel paranoid and restless after receiving a call from Aku, telling her that because of her research, the killer's mind will start to manifest itself inside of her. She visits Aku again, suspecting that he is involved with the murders, based on clues such as his color blindness connecting him to the red clothing worn by all the victims. Setsuko also likens Aku's sense of isolation to that felt by the victims. She accuses him of being heartless and manipulative during their relationship, while he says that his feelings of love for her remain unchanged. After Setsuko leaves, Aku watches old videotapes of the deprogramming of a cult member named Yuki, who blames herself for failing to save her mother from falling into a pit after being stung by a bee as a child.

The following Monday, Setsuko watches the subway station to prevent another murder but collapses after hallucinating Aku approaching her. During her recovery, she dreams of Aku and receives a call from him, telling her to come to the Re-Freezing Psychorium. Aku tells Setsuko that she is under his control and that she wants to be with him, despite her denial. When Setsuko arrives, she is locked in a room with a television screen playing a looped recording of Aku mocking her free will. This prolonged captivity drives Setsuko insane and leads her to believe that the murders are her fault for leaving Aku. She is forced to tell Aku that she loves him, and afterwards, Yuki enters the room. Setsuko escapes through the unlocked door, but when she returns home, she finds that her husband, Tomoo, has been killed. During the autopsy, it is discovered that Tomoo was intersex. Setsuko tells the police that all of the killings were committed by her and Aku, and she is committed to a psychiatric hospital. Aku has disappeared without a trace.

While being transferred to another hospital, Setsuko is kidnapped by Aku. When she awakens in his facility, he prepares to kill her, but she stabs him with a knife. Yuki enters the room, revealing herself to have committed the subway murders in revenge for Aku's manipulative brainwashing. She attempts to kill both him and Setsuko with her needle. Aku subdues her and convinces her to kill herself by evoking her childhood trauma, saving Setsuko in the process. He then reveals that the story about Yuki's mother's death was not real; he implanted it in her mind in order to control her murderous impulses. These false memories backfired and turned Yuki into a serial killer who used needles to "sting" her victims.

The police arrive and Yuki is declared the perpetrator of the serial murders. With a blank expression, Setsuko rests in Aku's arms while he smiles.

== Cast ==
- Kaho Minami as Setsuko Suma
- Takeshi Wakamatsu as Rei Aku
- Etsushi Toyokawa as Tomoo Suma
- Ryoko Takizawa as Yuki Takei
- Masayuki Shionoya as Fumio Banba
- Toshinori Kondo as Kotaro Shimada
- Yukio Yamato as Shinji Ashida
- Jin Nakayama as Professor Souda
- Tomorowo Taguchi as Endo

== Release ==
The film premiered in Japan on September 23, 1994. It premiered in the United States on January 24, 1997.

== Critical reception ==
Angel Dust has received positive reviews. Stephen Holden of The New York Times praised the atmosphere, cinematography, and soundtrack of the film, though criticized the ending. David Rooney of Variety said the plot is "at times on the fuzzy side," but Ishii "keeps the heady brew cooking, exercising a steely fascination that doesn't let up." He also complimented the editing, acting, and camerawork in the film. Richard Scheib of Moria Reviews gave Angel Dust three-and-a-half stars, calling it a "beautifully composed and serenely cool film". He compared the film to The Silence of the Lambs and praised the journey of the main heroine, although criticizing the execution of the overarching plot.

Michael Hewis of Cinema of the Abstract described the film as "an incredibly unsettling psychological horror film which creeps you out to the end" and cited similarities to other crime thriller films, such as Se7en and Manhunter. Hewis praised the atmosphere and setting of the film and also complimented the dreamlike quality to its storytelling. Marc Savlov of The Austin Chronicle said Angel Dust is "that rare avis, a cat-and-mouse thriller that lives up to – and surpasses – expectations." He praised Ishii's "crazed, shock-cut editing, surreal cinematography, and bombastic use of high-decibel industrial music," saying that the style creates an "infectious new twist" on the old "serial-killer subgenre."

== See also ==
- Aum Shinrikyo
- No man is an island
- Split Image (film)
- Cure (film)
- Stanislav Grof
