= Caterpillar (1988 film) =

- Japanese: キャタピラ
- Directed by: Shozin Fukui
- Starring: Eiko Kogure; Miu Narita; Katsumi Nishiyama; Takeshi Onizuka; Shojin; Kazuki Takenaka
- Cinematography: Shinobu Okunishi
- Edited by: Shozin Fukui
- Release date: 1988
- Running time: 32 minutes
- Country: Japan
- Language: Japanese

Caterpillar (キャタピラ) is a 1988 short experimental film by Japanese underground filmmaker Shozin Fukui. Fukui made the film at around the same time as when he was working as a crew member for Shinya Tsukamoto's Tetsuo: The Iron Man. Both films utilize similar filmmaking techniques such as hyperactive, handheld camerawork and stop-motion photography.

== Plot ==
The lives of several people are haunted by a grotesque and monstrous caterpillar-like creature that roams the streets of Japan.

== Cast ==
- Eiko Kogure
- Miu Narita
- Katsumi Nishiyama
- Takeshi Onizuka
- Shojin
- Kazuki Takenaka

== Release ==
Caterpillar was included as a bonus feature for the Unearthed Films DVD release of Fukui's first feature film 964 Pinocchio in 2007. The DVD has since been discontinued.
