= Electric Dragon 80.000 V =

2001 film by Gakuryū Ishii

- Film poster
- Directed by: Gakuryū Ishii
- Written by: Gakuryū Ishii
- Produced by: Takenori Sento
- Starring: Tadanobu Asano; Masakatsu Funaki; Masatoshi Nagase
- Cinematography: Norimichi Kasamatsu
- Edited by: Shuichi Kakesu
- Music by: Hiroyuki Onogawa; MACH-1.67
- Distributed by: Discotek Media; Unearthed Films
- Release date: 2001
- Running time: 55 minutes
- Country: Japan
- Language: Japanese

Electric Dragon 80.000 V (Japanese: エレクトリック·ドラゴン 80000V, Hepburn: Erekutorikku doragon 80000V) is a 2001 Japanese tokusatsu film written and directed by Gakuryū Ishii. The comic-book style story stars Tadanobu Asano and Masatoshi Nagase as electricity wielding super-heroes.

== Plot ==
As a child, Dragon Eye Morrison undergoes electro-shock treatment for his aggressive behavior. The levels of sheer energy absorbed by his body over the years allow him to channel and conduct electricity. Now an adult, Morrison works in the city as a reptile investigator and has learned to channel his rage through the performance of aggressive guitar-based noise. Meanwhile, Thunderbolt Buddha, a TV repair man turned vigilante, who has the same electro-conductive powers after a childhood accident, goes after crime bosses and gangsters. When both men learn of each other's existence, Thunderbolt Buddha challenges Morrison to a final showdown on the rooftops of Tokyo.

== Cast ==
- Tadanobu Asano – Dragon Eye Morrison
- Masatoshi Nagase – Thunderbolt Buddha
- Masakatsu Funaki – Narrator

== Production ==
Filming occurred in February 1999 using black and white film, and lasted three weeks. It was produced in tandem with Ishii's other film Gojoe, and both films cast the same two lead actors.

== Soundtrack ==
Gakuryū Ishii's industrial noise-punk outfit MACH-1.67 provided the film's propulsive music. The film would subsequently be used as a visual backdrop during the band's live performances.

== Release and reception ==
The film debuted at the International Film Festival Rotterdam in 2001. It also screened at the Toronto International Film Festival and the Busan International Film Festival.

Variety's David Rooney wrote, "A return from his more structured thrillers like Angel Dust and Labyrinth of Dreams to the punky kinetic anarchy of his early work, Japanese maverick Sogo Ishii delivers a wild ride." Mark Schilling of The Japan Times described the film as "a black comedy for hipsters and works well on that level, though it overstays its welcome," and IndieWire's Edward Crouse wrote that "the film nails a certain sci-fi madness." Tom Mes wrote on the website Midnight Eye, "A 55-minute hyperkinetic descent into electro-charged punk madness, set to an eardrum-shattering industrial punk/noise soundtrack, Electric Dragon 80,000 V transcends film to become an overwhelming, all-immersing experience."

Electric Dragon 80,000V and its companion film Gojoe were commercial failures and ultimately caused their production company Suncent CinemaWorks Inc. to go under.

UK film distributor Third Window Films, released a Blu-ray version of the film.
