= Zipang (film) =

- Theatrical release poster

Japanese name
- Kanji: ZIPANG ジパング
Transcriptions
- Revised Hepburn: Jipangu
- Directed by: Kaizo Hayashi
- Written by: Kaizo Hayashi, Arata Tendo
- Produced by: Koji Tsutsumi
- Starring: Masahiro Takashima; Narumi Yasuda; Shiro Sano; Kenya Sawada; Mikio Narita; Mikijirō Hira
- Cinematography: Masaki Tamura
- Edited by: Osamu Inoue
- Music by: Yōko Kumagai, Hidehiko Urayama
- Production companies: TBS, EXE
- Distributed by: Toho
- Release date: January 27, 1990 (Japan)
- Running time: 119 minutes
- Country: Japan
- Language: Japanese

Zipang (Japanese: ZIPANG(ジパング), Hepburn: Jipangu), also known as The Legend of Zipang, is a 1990 Japanese tokusatsu fantasy film directed by Kaizo Hayashi. The film stars Masahiro Takashima as Jigoku Gokuraku Maru.

== Cast ==
- Masahiro Takashima as Jigoku Gokuraku Maru
- Narumi Yasuda as Yuri the Pistol
- Shirō Sano as Bunshichi the Puppetmaster
- Kenya Sawada as Tobatsu
- Mikio Narita as Hayashi Razan
- Mikijirō Hira as King of Zipang
- Haruko Wanibuchi as Queen
- Takuya Wada as Ashura
- Jian Xin as Tattoo Man

== Production ==
In scenes that transcend time and space, a time-consuming expression method is adopted in which photographs are copied and modified, and effects such as zooming and rotation are added to take each photograph one-by-one.

The film's theme song is "Endless Rain" by X Japan.

== Release ==
=== Theatrical ===
Zipang was released in Japan on January 27, 1990 where it was distributed by Toho. The film was released at the Stockholm International Film Festival in November 1990 in Sweden.

=== Home media ===
Video TBS released the film on VHS in 1990 and Art Port released the film on DVD in 2001.

== Reception ==
The Austin Chronicle said "if, however, you're looking to switch off your brain and simply have a good time, then don't miss out on this kinetic roller coaster of a movie... it's a real hoot."

== Other media ==
Two video games were tie-ins for this movie:

- Zipang (ジパング) for the PC Engine, developed by Arc and published by Pack-In-Video, is a conversion of Tecmo's arcade puzzle-platformer Solomon's Key with the art reworked to tie in with the movie. It was only released in Japan.
- Jigoku Gokuraku Maru (地獄極楽丸) for the Famicom, developed by Human and also published by Pack-In-Video, is a 2D platformer. It was retitled Kabuki: Quantum Fighter for its Western release, and the plot was changed to remove the connection to the movie.
