= Gakuryū Ishii =

Japanese filmmaker (born 1957)

- Born: Toshihiro Ishii; January 15, 1957 (age 69); Fukuoka, Fukuoka, Japan
- Other name: Sogo Ishii
- Education: Nihon University
- Occupation: Film director
- Years active: 1978–present
- Movement: Japanese Cyberpunk
- Website: www.ishiisogo-gakuryu.com

Gakuryū Ishii (石井 岳龍, Ishii Gakuryū; born January 15, 1957), formerly known as Sogo Ishii (石井 聰亙, Ishii Sōgo), is a Japanese filmmaker known for his stylistic punk films, which helped spark the cyberpunk movement in Japan. A number of contemporary filmmakers including Quentin Tarantino have cited Ishii's films as an influence.

== Early life ==
Born Toshihiro Ishii, (石井 聰亙), he grew up in Hakata, and because of all the American military bases in the area, he was exposed to a lot of American rock music. He spent his teenage years a part of the punk rock movement that grew in that region, singing and playing the guitar.

In 1977 he enrolled at Nihon University in Tokyo, and founded Kyōei-sha (Crazy Film Group). He borrowed equipment from the school to shoot his own 8mm and 16mm short films, which featured the style and philosophy of his punk roots. It was difficult for a young person in Japan to make films during that period, and he decided to skip the traditional corporate ladder route to film directing by just making the films himself.

== Career ==
During his first year of college, one of Ishii's short films called Panic High School was noticed by Nikkatsu, a movie studio known at the time for its pink films. Nikkatsu provided the funding to adapt the short into a feature-length film. Yukihiro Sawada co-directed the film with Ishii, who was still only a sophomore in college. It was around this time that he started going by Sogo Ishii.

Ishii directed his second feature Crazy Thunder Road as his senior thesis for university, and the 16mm film was subsequently bought by Toei, who distributed it in 35mm. As his fame started to grow, a popular punk band named Anarchy hired Ishii to shoot a promo for them, which resulted in a ten-minute film called Anarchy '80 Ishin. He also adapted Katsuhiro Otomo's manga Run into the 30-minute film Shuffle. He continued to use the university's film equipment as long as he could, but since he had no intentions of actually graduating, they eventually expelled him.

In 1982, Ishii directed Burst City, an action film about a wild gang of quasi-mutant bikers who ride into a town staging protests against the construction of a nearby nuclear reactor plant. The film starred members of Japanese punk bands The Roosters, The Rockers, The Stalin and Inu, among others. He became a favorite among rebel and punk cineastes in Japan. The film is also credited as a precursor to the underground Japanese cyberpunk movement that emerged later in the decade.

Ishii took a short break from filmmaking in 1983 to form a band called Sogo Ishii and the Bacillus Army, which recorded one album, Asia Strikes Back. He also created a 30 min film for the band that was played during their tour. In 1984 he released his fourth feature film, The Crazy Family.

After the release of The Crazy Family, there was a period of ten years where Ishii couldn't get any funding to make another feature film. His previous films had been very popular with foreign film festival audiences, but not with Japanese ones: they didn't understand his films. He spent his time during this gap making shorts, music videos, and concert films, including ones for The Roosters and Einstürzende Neubauten.

Finally in 1994, he was hired to direct the feature film Angel Dust. Around this time he started to change his filmmaking style partly because he wanted to challenge himself to something new, but also because it had been very difficult to find funding for the types of films he made before. During this period he directed two films that were less plot driven: August in the Water and Labyrinth of Dreams.

The actor Tadanobu Asano teamed up with Ishii in 1996 to form the experimental noise band MACH-1.67, which would later compose some of the music for the film Electric Dragon 80.000 V. Ishii directed two films back to back: Gojoe, a 2000 action film about 12th century Japan, and Electric Dragon 80.000 V, a 2001 black-and-white 55-minute film starring Tadanobu Asano and Masatoshi Nagase. These two films combined the abstract style of his recent films with the intense energy of his early works. Ishii himself described this transition: "When I was young, all I could think about was speed. Then I wanted to start to slow things down a bit—now both are important." While Electric Dragon was praised by critics, both films were huge financial flops: so much so that they put Suncent Cinema Works out of business.

Those films were followed by another ten-year gap in making feature films. Ishii started teaching film at Kobe Design University in 2006, and spent those ten years focused on teaching and experimenting with digital filmmaking by creating music videos, television episodes, and experimental shorts.

In 2012, he returned with Isn't Anyone Alive?, changing his name from Sogo Ishii to Gakuryū Ishii (Gakuryū meaning dragon). In 2013 he released The Flower of Shanidar, which stars Gō Ayano and Hana Kuroki,. In 2016, Ishii released the erotic fantasy film Bitter Honey (Mitsu no aware), based on the novel by Murō Saisei, about the relationship between a dying writer, played by Ren Osugi, and his goldfish who takes the form of a beautiful girl, played by Fumi Nikaidō. In June 2018 he released Punk Samurai Slash Down, which was produced by NTT DoCoMo.

== Filmography ==
=== Feature films ===
Year	Title	Notes
1978	Panic High School	Co-director
1978	Charge! Hakata Gangsters	8mm
1980	Crazy Thunder Road	
1982	Burst City	
1984	The Crazy Family	
1994	Angel Dust	
1995	August in the Water	
1997	Labyrinth of Dreams	
2000	Gojoe	
2001	Electric Dragon 80.000 V	
2003	Dead End Run	16mm > 35mm
2005	Mirrored Mind	
2011	60 Seconds of Solitude in Year Zero	
2012	Isn't Anyone Alive?	
2013	The Flower of Shanidar	
2015	Soredake / That's It	
2016	Mitsu no aware / Bitter Honey	
2018	Punk Samurai Slash Down	
2023	Self-Revolutionary Cinematic Struggle	
2024	The Box Man	World premiere at 74th Berlin International Film Festival on 17 February 2024.

=== Short films ===
Year	Title	Notes
1976	Panic High School	8mm
1977	Solitude of One Divided by 880,000	8mm
1981	Shuffle	35mm
1983	Asia Strikes Back	16mm
1986	The Master of Shiatsu	35mm
1993	J-Movie Wars: Tokyo Blood	35mm
2002	Stop The Time You Are Beautiful	TV 16mm
2005	A Day of the God Island	

=== Music Videos ===
Year	Title	Notes
1981	Anarchy ‘80 Revolution	
1986	Halber Mensch	16mm Art MV
1989	Dumb Numb: Live Friction	

=== Others ===
- Neo Ultra Q (2013) - TV Series
