= Masashi Yamamoto =

Japanese film director

- Born: 24 January 1956 (age 69); Ōita Prefecture, Japan
- Occupation: Film director

Masashi Yamamoto (山本政志, Yamamoto Masashi) (born 24 January 1956) is a Japanese film director.

== Career ==
Born in Ōita Prefecture, Yamamoto attended Meiji University but left early to concentrate on making independent 8mm films. His Carnival in the Night screened at the 1983 Berlin Film Festival and Robinson's Garden was given the Zitty Award at 1987 edition of the Berlinale. The latter film also earned him the Directors Guild of Japan New Directors Award. In 1998 he was given a research fellowship from Japan's Agency for Cultural Affairs to study in New York, during which time he set up screenings of his film Junk Food in America. Often filming those living on the margins of Japanese society, his film Limousine Drive was actually filmed in the United States. He has also acted in some films.

== Selected filmography ==
- Carnival in the Night (闇のカーニバル, Yami no kānibaru) (1983)
- Robinson's Garden (ロビンソンの庭, Robinson no niwa) (1987)
- What's up Connection (てなもんやコネクション, Tenamonya Konekushon) (1990)
- Atlanta Boogie (アトランタ・ブギ, Atoranta Bugi) (1997)
- Junk Food (ジャンクフード) (1998)
- Limousine Drive (リムジンドライブ, Rimujin doraibu) (2000)
- Cycle (サイクル) (2005)
- Man Woman and the Wall (聴かれた女, Kikareta onna) (2007)
- Three☆Points (スリー☆ポイント, Three☆Points) (2011)
- The Voice of Water (水の声を聞く, Mizu no Koe wo Kiku) (2014)
- Nōten Paradise (脳天パラダイス) (2020)
