= Miwako Ichikawa =

Japanese actress and singer (born 1976)

- 市川 実和子
- Born: March 19, 1976 (age 50); Ota-ku, Tokyo, Japan
- Occupations: Actress, model, singer
- Years active: 1991–present

Miwako Ichikawa (市川 実和子, Ichikawa Miwako; born 19 March 1976 in Ota, Tokyo) is a Japanese actress, sister of actress Mikako Ichikawa. She began in 1991 as a model, and released a single in 1998 and an album the following year. She debuted in acting in 2000 and starred in the films Another Heaven in 2000 and Konsento (aka Concent or Power Point) in 2002. But after that, she received minor roles in films All About Lily Chou-Chou, Karaoke Terror, Princess Raccoon, and in TV dramas, including Mike Hama or Anego with Ryoko Shinohara. She was given one of the main roles 2008 film Nightmare Detective 2.

== Discography ==
=== Singles ===
- "Pop Star" (ポップスタ) (1998)

=== Albums ===
- Pin-up Girl (1999)

== Filmography ==
=== Films ===
- Rebirth (2011), Kumi Sawada
- Around the Table (2021)
- Will I Be Single Forever? (2021), Yukino
- Just Remembering (2022), Makita
- Haw (2022)
- Call Me Chihiro (2023), the other Chihiro
- Ghost Cat Anzu (2024), Yuzuki (voice)
- Trophy (2026)

=== Television ===
- Boogie Woogie (2023), Mari Hatori
- Straight to Hell (2026)
