= Shigeru Izumiya =

Japanese poet, folk singer, actor, tarento (born 1948)

Shigeru Izumiya 泉谷 しげる
- Born: 11 May 1948 (age 78); Aomori Prefecture, Japan
- Genre: Folk music
- Occupations: Singer, actor and tarento
- Instrument: Guitar
- Years active: 1971–present
- Label: Pony Canyon
- Website: www.wagasha.co.jp

Shigeru Izumiya (泉谷 しげる Izumiya Shigeru, born May 11, 1948) is a Japanese poet, folk singer, actor, tarento. He established the record company For Life Records with Takuro Yoshida, Yosui Inoue, and Hitoshi Komuro in 1975. He also directed the 1986 film Death Powder (Desu Paudā).

Between August 1995 and March 1996, Izumiya co-hosted the Satellaview-based weekly SoundLink Magazine, "King of After School" (放課後の王様, Houkago no Ousama), with Ayumi Hamasaki.

Izumiya was born in Aomori, Japan, and raised in Meguro, Tokyo.

== Discography ==
=== Singles ===
1970s

- Kaerimichi c/w Gimu (帰り道c/w義務) (1971)
- Shunkashuutou c/w Hinekure Komoriuta (春夏秋冬 c/wひねくれ子守歌) (1972)
- Haru no Karatsu Kaze c/w Onou (春のからっ風 c/wおー脳) (1973)
- Nemure Nai Yoru c/w Ran . Ran . Ran (眠れない夜c/w乱・乱・乱) (1974)
- Samui Kuni Kara Kita Tegami c/w 1/2 Burusu (寒い国から来た手紙c/w1/2ブルース) (1975)
- Kare to Kanojo c/w Kurenai no Tsubasa (彼と彼女c/w紅の翼) (1976)
- Denkousekka ni Gin no Kutsu c/w Kettei! Honki . Furikake . Tonku (電光石火に銀の靴c/w決定!ホンキー・ふりかけ・トンク) (1977)
- Tabidate Nyoubou c/w Tasogare no Orenji . Rodo (旅立て女房c/w黄昏のオレンジ・ロード) (1977)
- Hadaka no Machi c/w Reiko (裸の街c/wレイコ) (1978)
- Detoroito . Poka c/w Onna Tachihe (デトロイト・ポーカーc/w女たちへ) (1979)
- Ore no Onna c/w Ou no Yami (俺の女c/w王の闇) (1979)

1980s

- Rei . Rei . Rei c/w Kasshoku no Serusuman (レイ・レイ・レイc/w褐色のセールスマン) (1980)
- Eejanaika c/w I.BO! Konya ha Tetsuya Daze (ええじゃないかc/wI.BO!今夜は徹夜だぜ) (1981)
- Sairentoman c/w Chikashitsu no Hiro (サイレントマンc/w地下室のヒーロー) (1982)
- 39°8' c/w Himitsu Naki Buru (39°8′c/w秘密なきブルー) (1983)
- UNDER PRICK c/w HAIR STYLE(1984)
- Yasei no Baraddo c/w Nikudan Ressha Ni Akai Bara (野生のバラッドc/w肉弾列車に赤いバラ) (1987)
- Nagai Tomo Tono Hajimari Ni c/w Nemure Nai Yoru (長い友との始まりにc/w眠れない夜) (live, 1988)
- Shunkashuutou c/w Rokkunroru Nya Kin Kakaru (春夏秋冬 c/w ロックンロールにゃ金かかる) (1988)
- Hareruya c/w Ryuuketsu no Narawashi (ハレルヤc/w流血のならわし) (1989)

1990s

- Sakebu Hitosasayaku c/w Munou (叫ぶひとささやくc/wムノウ) (1991)
- Naze, Konna Jidai ni... c/w Deino . Araivu ~ Kyouryuujidai (なぜ、こんな時代に...c/wディノ・アライヴ～恐竜時代) (1993)
- Hageshii Kisetsu c/w Fuyu no Hikari (激しい季節 c/w 冬の光) (1994)
- Toshi no Yuubae c/w Tsunahiki (都市の夕映え c/w つなひき) (1994)
- Eien no Yakusoku c/w Heddoraito (永遠の約束 c/w ヘッドライト) (1995)
- It's gonna be ALRIGHT c/w Getto (It's gonna be ALRIGHTc/wゲットー)(1995)
- Ashita Mo Kyou no Yume no Tsuduki o c/w Souru Dekai Hanashi (明日も今日の夢の続きをc/wソウルでかい噺) (1998)

2000s

- Gegege no Kitarou (ゲゲゲの鬼太郎) (2007)
- Terebi Anime (Gegege no Kitarou) Dai 5 Saku Opuningutema (テレビアニメ『ゲゲゲの鬼太郎』第5作オープニングテーマ)
- Subete Jidai no Seinishite (すべて時代のせいにして) (2008)
- Raibu Kaijou . Tuuhan Gentei Hanbai (4 Kyoku Makishi) (ライブ会場・通販限定販売 (4曲マキシ))
- Umare Ochi Ta Mono He / BIG BOY!! (生まれ落ちた者へ／BIG BOY!!) (2009)

=== Albums ===
1970s

- Izumiya Shigeru Toujou (泉谷しげる登場) (1971)
- Shun . Ka . Shuu. Tou (春・夏・秋・冬) (1972)
- Chikyuu wa O-Matsuri Sawagi (地球はお祭り騒ぎ) (1972, CD rereleased in 2006)
- Hikari to Kage (光と影) (1973)
- Ougon Kyou Jidai (黄金狂時代) (1974)
- Raivu!! Izumitani ~Ousama Tachino Yoru ~ (ライヴ!!泉谷～王様たちの夜～)(1975)
- Kazoku (家族) (1976)
- Isuto Karano Atsui Kaze (イーストからの熱い風) (1976)
- Hikari Ishi no Kyojin (光石の巨人) (1977)
- '80 no Baraddo ('80のバラッド) (1978)
- Tokai no Ranna (都会のランナー) (1979)

1980s

- Orunaitoraibu (オールナイトライブ) (1980)
- NEWS (1982)
- 39°8´ (1983)
- REAL TIME (1984)
- ELEVATOR (1984)
- SCAR PEOPLE (1986)
- Hoe Ru Baraddo (吠えるバラッド) (1988)
- EARLY TIME (1988)
- HOWLING LIVE (1988)
- IZUMIYA SELF COVERS (1988)
- '90s Baraddo ('90s バラッド) (1989)

1990s

- Sakebu Hito Sasayaku (叫ぶひと囁く) (1991)
- Gerou Sanjou (下郎参上) (1991)
- Kesubaikesu (ケースバイケース) (1991)
- Riaru . Taimu (リアル・タイム) (1992)
- HOT TYPHOON FROM EAST (1992)
- WILD BLOOD (1993)
- Jigajisan (自画自賛) (1993)
- Hitori Fokugerira! LIVE!! (ひとりフォークゲリラ!LIVE!!) (1993)
- Messeji . Songusu (メッセージ・ソングス) (1994)
- Tsuioku no Eitobito (追憶のエイトビート) (1995)
- Zenshinzenrei ~Life to soul~ (全身全霊～Life to soul～) (1996)
- Taiketsu ~Fukushuu Suruha Ware Niari~ (対決～復讐するは我にあり～) (1997)
- Watashi Niha Yume Gaaru (私には夢がある) (1998)
- Besuto Ban (ベスト盤) (1998)
- Izumitani Shigeru LIVE Ten (泉谷しげる LIVE展) (1999)
- Besumento . Tepusu (ベースメント・テープス) (1999)

2000s

- IRA (2000)
- Kishikaisei (起死回生) (2001)
- R-15 (2002)
- Izumitani Shigeru 10 Maigumi BOX Setto (Kuroi Kapan) (泉谷しげる10枚組BOXセット「黒いカパン」) (2007, Limited Edition DVD Box set)
- Subete Jidai no Seinishite Puremiamusetto (すべて時代のせいにして プレミアムセット) (2008)
- Subete Jidai no Seinishite (すべて時代のせいにして) (2008)
- Besutoarubamu <2 Maigumi> (ベストアルバム〈2枚組〉) (2008)
- Raivu!! Izumitani ~Ousama Tachino Yoru~ (ライヴ!!泉谷～王様たちの夜～) (2008)

== Filmography ==
=== Film ===
- Eijanaika (1981)
- Blood Is Sex (1982) (director)
- Death Powder (1986) (director)
- Aitsu ni Koishite (1987)
- Pom Poko (1994) – Gonta (voice)
- Doraemon: Nobita in the Wan-Nyan Spacetime Odyssey (2004) (voice)
- Godzilla: Final Wars (2004)
- Ode to Joy (2006)
- Black Widow Business (2016)
- Fukushima 50 (2020)
- A Morning of Farewell (2021)
- Tsuyukusa (2022)
- Dr. Coto's Clinic 2022 (2022), Shigeo Ando

=== Television ===
- The Women of Osaka Castle (1983), Toyotomi Hidetsugu
- Dr. Coto's Clinic (2003–06), Shigeo Ando
