= Gojoe =

2000 Japanese film by Gakuryū Ishii

Gojoe: Spirit War Chronicle
- Film poster
- Directed by: Gakuryū Ishii
- Written by: Goro Nakajima; Gakuryū Ishii
- Produced by: Takenori Sento
- Starring: Tadanobu Asano; Masatoshi Nagase; Daisuke Ryu; Jun Kunimura
- Cinematography: Makoto Watanabe
- Edited by: Shuichi Kasesu
- Music by: Hiroyuki Onogawa
- Production company: Toho
- Release dates: September 11, 2000 (Toronto); October 7, 2001 (Japan)
- Running time: 138 minutes
- Country: Japan

Gojoe (Japanese: 五条霊戦記 GOJOE, Hepburn: Gojō Reisenki) is a 2000 Japanese jidaigeki action film directed by Gakuryū Ishii. In several English-speaking countries, it was released as Gojoe: Spirit War Chronicle. It is a historical fantasy martial arts film set in 12th-century medieval Japan before the Genpei War.

== Plot ==
After the apparent defeat of the Genji in the war for Japan, a mysterious demon lurking at the Gojoe bridge in Kyoto kills every Heike warrior that tries to cross it. Meanwhile Musashibo Benkei, a samurai turned Buddhist monk out of repentance for his past crimes, receives a divine signal from Acalanatha informing him that he only will be forgiven after slaying the demon. Borrowing a sacred sword from a yamabushi sect, and against the wishes of his mentor Ajari, Benkei sets out to destroy the monster.

At the scene of one of the murders in Gojoe, Benkei encounters his old rival Tankai, and also meets a scavenger named Tetsukichi, a former weaponsmith who now survives from looting from battle corpses. One night, during a failed attempt by the Heike clan of killing the demon through large numbers of troops, Benkei discovers the supposed demon is actually three superhuman masked warriors. They are Shanao, a young mystic and heir to the Genji, and his two retainers Gojin and Keshimaru. Back in their cave refuge, Shanao is urged by his priest Shoshinbo to take command of the disorganized Genji army to get revenge on the Heike.

Benkei starts a search to locate Shanao's cave accompanied by Tetsukichi. It is then revealed that the latter used to be a legendary swordmaker, but he retired because his weapons were used by sōhei to indulge in bloodshed, and only follows Benkei under the promise of looting Shanao's collection of captured swords. However, he develops a grudging respect towards Benkei after the latter exorcizes a possessed parturient woman, Asagiri. Later in their quest, they reach a forest cursed by evil spirits, who Benkei tries to banish, but he is stopped by spells sent by Shanao. Benkei and Tetsukichi are then arrested by Heike soldiers, who take the former to their leader Taira no Tadanori.

Tadanori asks for Benkei's help to solidify the Heike dominance over Japan, but Benkei refuses, having dedicated his life to Buddha. Tadanori orders Benkei to be tied under the sun to torment him, then arranges for him to duel Tankai, wanting Benkei to show his true power. However, having sworn off his warrior past, Benkei refuses, and he is to be executed when Shanao and his retainers attack the place, which causes a three-way battle in which Tadanori dies. Cutting down Tankai, Shanao faces off with Benkei and breaks the sacred sword due to Benkei's reluctance to fight. However, Ajari appears to scare Shanao away and reveal that Acalanatha's signal was actually a delusion.

After the faceoff, Shanao abandons his allegiance for the Genji and announces he will fight only for himself. He visits Ajari, revealing him that the gods have abandoned the world and boasting only he has the power to do so now, and cuts down the old master. Shanao then initiates an iconoclast rampage, killing monks and desecrating statues, which spreads insanity around the land, and challenges Benkei him to a duel in the bridge. Finding Tetsukichi alive among the corpses of Asagiri and Tankai's warriors, Benkei asks him to reforge the sacred sword. Tetsukichi feels hopeless, but after watching Benkei mystically revive Asagiri's baby as his last deed as a monk, he helps him.

Shanao comes to the bridge after having assumed the name of Yoshitsune, while Benkei confronts him while wearing armor and carrying multiple weapons, embracing his warrior ethos. The two fight, only for the sacred sword to break again. However, Benkei now utilizes the rest of his weapons, which get similarly destroyed, and while unarmed he uses jujutsu. Although Yoshitsune seems near the victory, Benkei announces he will finally show him his demon blood and fights him wielding a piece of sword. Yoshitsune stabs Benkei through the torso, but Benkei raises the piece to the stormy sky, attracting a bolt of lightning that kills them both and destroys the bridge.

After the duel, Shoshinbo meets a group of emissaries of the Genji, whom he makes believe that Keshimaru and Gojin are respectively Yoshitsune and a now allied Benkei. At the bridge, a Tetsukichi rendered blind by the lightning searches desperately for Benkei among the rubble, but he only finds the baby, still miraculously alive.

== Cast ==
- Daisuke Ryu as Musashibo Benkei
- Tadanobu Asano as Shanao/Yoshitsune
- Masatoshi Nagase as Tetsukichi
- Saburo Teshigawara as Ajari
- Masakatsu Funaki as Tankai
- Ittoku Kishibe as Taira no Tadanori
- Jun Kunimura as Suzaku-hougan
- Wui-Sin Chong (credited as Yoshinobu Tei) as Sashinbo
- Takahito Hosoyamada as Keshimaru
- Atsushi Narita as Gojin
- Taketoshi Naito as the old man in the bridge
- Urara Awata as Ashagiri
- Nobuhiro Suwa as Taira no Kiyomori (flashback)
- Toshihiro Isomi as Minamoto no Yoshitomo (flashback)
- Ikui Ishii as Tokiwa Gozen (flashback)

== Production ==
Film producer Takenori Sento, who helped produce the Ring Trilogy, wanted to create a box office hit by making an action film in the jidaigeki genre.

== Release ==
The film was first shown in North America as part of the 2000 Toronto International Film Festival. The film was also shown at the 2001 Sitges Film Festival. The film was set for an October 7, 2001 theatrical release in Japan.

== Awards ==
Actor Tadanobu Asano won the award for Best Supporting Actor at the Hochi Film Awards in 2000 for his role in this film and in Taboo.

== Reception ==
Variety gave the film a mixed review, stating that "Despite an impressive opening and suitably titanic finale, yarn about various warriors battling one another during the 'Dark Ages' is way overlong at almost 2 1/2 hours and soon palls with its endless succession of sylvan swordplay." The Japan Times compared the final action scene to the "excessive episodes of the Dragonball Z" and that the film may "bring in the same kids who made the Ring films an event – but it's not going to make anyone forget Shichinin no Samurai". Kurosawa's masterpiece delivers the essence of battle with gut-wrenching authority." Film4 gave the film a positive review, stating that "What it lacks in humour (and there is absolutely none to be found in it), Gojoe more than makes up for in its sheer, unrelenting intensity, something which few other directors would be able to sustain over so long a duration."
