= Kaizo Hayashi =

Japanese director and screenwriter (born 1957)

- Born: July 15, 1957 (age 69); Kyoto, Japan
- Occupations: Screenwriter and film director

Kaizo Hayashi (林 海象, Hayashi Kaizō; born July 15, 1957) is a Japanese film director and screenwriter. He made his directorial debut with To Sleep so as to Dream (1986). He is best known for his neo-noir Maiku Hama trilogy, The Most Terrible Time in My Life (1994), Stairway to the Distant Past (1995) and The Trap (1996). In addition to film, Hayashi served as creative director on the 2000 Konami video game 7 Blades for the PlayStation 2, and was director for two episodes of Power Rangers: Time Force.

== Partial filmography ==
- To Sleep So as to Dream (夢みるように眠りたい, Yume miru yō ni nemuritai, 1986)
- Tokyo: The Last Megalopolis (帝都物語, Teito monogatari, 1988)
- Tokyo: The Last War (帝都大戦, Teito taisen, 1989)
- Circus Boys (二十世紀少年読本, Nijūsseiki shōnen dokuhon, 1989)
- Zipang (1990)
- Figaro Story (フィガロ・ストーリー, Figaro sutōrī, 1991, "Man from the Moon" segment)
- The Most Terrible Time in My Life (我が人生最悪の時, Waga jinsei saiaku no toki, 1994)
- Stairway to the Distant Past (遥かな時代の階段を, Haruka na jidai no kaidan o, 1995)
- The Trap (罠, Wana, 1996)
- The Breath (海ほおずき, Umihoozuki, 1996)
- Cat's Eye (1997)
- Bolt (2020)
