= Rubber's Lover =

1996 Japanese film

- DVD Cover
- Directed by: Shozin Fukui
- Written by: Shozin Fukui
- Starring: Nao Ameya
- Production company: Honekoubou
- Release date: September 28, 1996
- Running time: 91 minutes
- Country: Japan
- Language: Japanese

Rubber's Lover (ラバーズ・ラバー) is a 1996 black and white Japanese cyberpunk-horror film written and directed by Shozin Fukui (best known for 964 Pinocchio).

== Premise ==
Often interpreted as a prequel to 964 Pinocchio, Rubber's Lover details a clandestine group of scientists who conduct psychic experiments on human guinea-pigs that they take from the streets. Using brain-altering drugs, sensory deprivation and computer interfaces, they subject their patients to gruesome scientific tortures that often end in brutal death. After continued failure and pressure from the company to cancel the project, they pursue one last experiment using one of their own as a test subject – yielding dangerous results.

== Production ==
Fukui began preparations for Rubber's Lover directly after the release of 964 Pinocchio.

Filming was planned to be completed within one month, but took six months due to unforeseen budget and preparation issues. The warehouse in which filming took place was originally rented for another of Fukui's projects, however was repurposed to film Rubber's Lover after the initial project was cancelled. Rubber's Lover took five years to complete.

During filming, the crew were prohibited from speaking in order to create a feeling of separation for the actors, which Fukui described as being "very hard for staff and cast.".

== Release ==
Rubber's Lover was re-released on Blu-Ray in 2025 by New Wave Video.

== Similar works ==
Tetsuo: The Iron Man, which Fukui worked on as an assistant director.

Rubber's Lover is often interpreted as a prequel to 964 Pinocchio.

== See also ==
- Japanese horror
- Japanese science fiction
- 964 Pinoccio
