= Der Eisenrost =

Der Eisenrost (literally 'The Iron Rust') is one of the premier industrial "Metal Percussion" units in Tokyo, Japan. They are best known for producing the film soundtrack for Shinya Tsukamoto's Tokyo Fist. Lead man and innovator Chu Ishikawa was notable for the futuristic, often industrial soundtracks for independent film creator Shinya Tsukamoto. Films such as Tetsuo: The Iron Man, Bullet Ballet, and Gemini rank among the best known. Many of the members are also involved in their side project C.H.C. System.

== Discography ==
=== CDs ===
- Armored Weapon (Live Documents '93-'94)

=== DVDs ===
- The Law of Causality (Live at Shibuya O-NEST 26 May 2004)

=== VHS ===
- Live@Shibuya LA MAMA 1998
