= Masato Tsujioka =

Japanese actor and filmmaker (born 1979)

Masato Tsujioka 辻岡正人
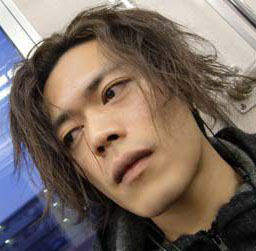
- Born: September 3, 1979 (age 46); Osaka, Japan
- Occupations: Director, Producer, Writer, and Actor
- Years active: 2003–present
- Website: http://www.geocities.jp/tsujiokamasato/

Masato Tsujioka (辻岡正人, Masato Tsujioka) (born September 3, 1979 in Toyonaka, Osaka) is a Japanese actor and filmmaker.

== Biography ==
TSUJIOKA Masato was born in 1979, in Osaka, Japan. He made his acting debut as part of the main cast of TSUKAMOTO Shinya's “BULLET BALLET” (98) which was screened at the Venice International Film Festival. Motivated by TSUKAMOTO's film making, he attracted attention in 2003 at the age of 23 with his debut film, “Lost by Dead” which depicted teens on a self-destructive rampage. With the combined numerous news reports and mass media exposure, the film's opening in Tokyo set a new attendance record, the reverberation of which spread among young people throughout the entire country resulting in the rare nationwide theatrical independent film release.

Afterward he directed “DIVIDE,” “DRASTIC,” “Dirty Heart,” “OLD PRISON,” “JUDGEMENT,” among others. He received the Best Director award at the Toronto ReelHeART Film Festival while a showcase of his works was held at the Japan-Filmfest Hamburg. As an actor, he has gone from appearing in films such as “Crow’s ZERO” to taking the lead role in films such as “Mada, Ningen,” among others. Furthermore, he was selected as one person who has contributed to and influenced local films by the prominent newspaper, Nikkei Entertainment's article “100 People Shaking Up Japanese Cinema.”

== Filmography ==
=== Actor ===
- Bullet Ballet (1999)
- Japanese Hell (1999)
- Rest@rt (2000)
- Suicide Club (2002)
- Igyo no Koi (2002)
- A Snake of June (2002)
- Tearing Picture (2002)
- Lost By Dead (2003)
- Cracker Life (2004)
- Kiokunoniwa (2004)
- Jyuzouchitai (2004)
- Hellevator: The Bottled Fools (2004)
- Vital (2005)
- Black Kiss (2005)
- Hibi (2005)
- Haze (2005)
- Divide (2005)
- Woman Can't Swim (2007)
- Crows Zero (2007)
- Undertaker Tsukiko (2007)
- Endless Love (2007)
- Watch the Dream (2007)
- Drastic (2008)
- Honky Tonk (2008)
- Phantom (2013)

=== Filmography as director ===
Year	English title	Japanese title	Romaji	Notes
2003	Lost By Dead	ロスト・バイ・デッド	Lost By Dead	(84 min.) Montreal International New Cinema Festival (Canada)
2005	Divide	ディバイド	Divide	(60 min.) Toronto ReelHeART International Film Festival (Canada) Best Director
2008	Drastic	ドラスティック	Drastic	(25 min.) London International Fantastic Film Festival (Uk), Japan Movie Fest (Japan)

=== Award ===
- Divide - Toronto ReelHeART International Film Festival (RHIFF), Best Director (2006)
