= Tomorowo Taguchi =

Japanese actor, film director and musician (born 1957)

Tomorowo Taguchi 田口 トモロヲ
- Born: Tomoo Taguchi (田口 智朗, Taguchi Tomoo); November 30, 1957 (age 68); Musashino, Tokyo, Japan
- Occupations: Actor, narrator
- Years active: 1978–present

Tomorowo Taguchi (田口 トモロヲ, Taguchi Tomorowo; born November 30, 1957) is a Japanese actor, film director and musician.

After leaving Dokkyo University without graduating, he started to earn his living as an illustrator, writer and pornographic cartoonist. He joined a theatre called Hakken no Kai in 1978 and he made a screen debut in Zokubutsu Zukan (based on the book by Yasutaka Tsutsui) in 1982. He was also a prominent cult musician in the Tokyo underground scene with his band Bachikaburi in the 1980s and early 1990s.

He is probably most well known to the West as the lead actor in Tetsuo and Tetsuo II directed by Shinya Tsukamoto. He also makes regular appearances in Takashi Miike's films. He became known to the Japanese public as a narrator for the TV documentary series Project X - Challengers which aired between 2000 and 2005 on NHK. Taguchi has directed 3 films, Iden & Tity in 2003, Shikisoku Generation in 2009, and Piece of Cake in 2015.

== Filmography ==
=== Films ===
Year	Film	Role	Notes	Ref
1987	The Adventure of Denchu-Kozo	Hijikata		
1989	Tetsuo: The Iron Man	Tomoo Taniguchi	First starring role (credited as Man)	
1992	Tetsuo II: Body Hammer	Tomoo Taniguchi		
1993	Fireworks, Should We See It from the Side or the Bottom?			
1995	Tokyo Fist	Tattoo Master		
1995	Love Letter	Female Itsuki's father		
	Shinjuku Triad Society	Wang		
1996	Gamera 2: Attack of Legion	Subway Driver		
1996	Swallowtail Butterfly			
1996	Makai Tenshō			
1996	Non-Stop			
1997	The Eel	Eiji Dojima		
	Rainy Dog			
	Full Metal Yakuza	Genpaku Hiraga		
1998	Andromedia	Gōda		
1998	Bullet Ballet			
1998	Dr. Akagi	Nosaka		
1999	Tomie	Detective Harada		
1999	Gamera 3: Awakening of Irys			
1999	Dead or Alive			
1999	Gemini	Middle-aged Patient		
1999	Taboo	Tojiro Yuzawa		
1999	Ley Lines	Chan		
2000	Keizoku			
2002	Doing Time			
2002	Aiki	Saburo Ishikawa		
2002	11'9"01 September 11			
2003	Owl			
2003	A Snake of June			
2005	Strange Circus	Taeko's Editor		
2005	It's Only Talk	K		
2005	Spring Snow	Yamada		
2005	Einstein Girl			
2006	Sway	Judge		
2006	Gamera the Brave			
2006	God's Left Hand, Devil's Right Hand	Koichiro Kubota		
2006	Akihabara@Deep			
2007	Kamen Rider The Next	Scissors Jaguar		
2007	Tokyo Tower: Mom and Me, and Sometimes Dad	Mailman		
2007	Like a Dragon	Korean-Japanese barbershop owner		
2008	Climber's High			
2009	April Bride	Okuno		
2009	Long Haired Monster Gehara		Daikaiju eiga	
2010	Tetsuo: The Bullet Man		Cameo appearance	
2011	Gantz	Yoshikazu Suzuki		
2011	Household X			
2013	Kamen Rider Wizard	Amadum	Guest appearance	
2014	Kabukicho Love Hotel			
2015	Piece of Cake		Director	
2017	P and JK	Yamamoto		
2017	Cat Collector's House	Asakusa		
2018	The Blood of Wolves			
2018	Life in Overtime			
2019	Parallel World Love Story			
2019	Violence Voyager	Koike (voice)		
2019	Blind			
2020	Fukushima 50			
2020	Fancy			
2020	#HandballStrive	Masao's father		
2020	Midnight Swan			
2021	The Door into Summer	Professor Junnosuke Toi		
2021	The Supporting Actors: The Movie	Himself		
2022	You've Got a Friend			
2022	Love Life	Makoto		
2024	Dare to Stop Us 2			
2024	Aimitagai	Yūsaku		
2024	Doctor-X: The Movie	Yūsuke Shindō		
2025	Welcome to the Village			
2025	Unreachable			
2026	Street Kingdom		Director	
2026	Bye Bye Love: Detective Is in the Bar			

=== Television ===
Year	Film	Role	Notes	Ref
1997	Mōri Motonari	Ashikaga Yoshitane	Taiga drama	
2012–21	Doctor-X: Surgeon Michiko Daimon	Narrator	7 seasons	
2017–21	The Supporting Actors	Himself	3 seasons	
2019	Idaten	Nobuhiko Kakanakuri	Taiga drama	
2019	In Hand	Hiroshi Yamazaki		
2023	Sanctuary	Tokitsu		
2024	House of Ninjas	Jin Hamashima		
