= Chu Ishikawa =

Japanese composer and musician

Chu Ishikawa 石川忠
- Born: Ishikawa Chū; February 6, 1966
- Origin: Japan
- Died: 21 December 2017 (aged 51)
- Genres: Industrial music
- Occupation: Film score composer
- Formerly of: Der Eisenrost Zeitlich Vergelter
- Website: Official website at the Wayback Machine (archived January 27, 2012)

Chu Ishikawa (石川忠, Ishikawa Chū; 6 February 1966 – 21 December 2017) was a Japanese composer and musician, best known for creating the soundtracks of many films by Shinya Tsukamoto and Takashi Miike. He also founded industrial music groups Der Eisenrost and Zeitlich Vergelter.

== Soundtracks ==
- Tetsuo: The Iron Man (1989)
- Tetsuo II: Body Hammer (1992)
- Tokyo Fist (1995)
- Fudoh: The New Generation (1996)
- Bullet Ballet (1998)
- Gemini (1999)
- Dead or Alive 2: Birds (2000)
- A Snake of June (2002)
- Vital (2004)
- Haze (2005)
- Nightmare Detective (2006)
- Nightmare Detective 2 (2008)
- Tetsuo: The Bullet Man (2010)
- Kotoko (2011)
- Fires on the Plain (2014)
- Killing (2018) (posthumous)
- Shadow Of Fire (2023) (posthumous)
