= Bullet Man =

Bullet Man may refer to:

- Bulletman, a superhero from Fawcett Comics
- Bullet Men, a set of South Korean sculptures
- Tetsuo: The Bullet Man, a Japanese cyberpunk horror film
