= Yusaku Mori =

Japanese actor (born 1989)

- 森優作
- Born: December 4, 1989 (age 36); Osaka Prefecture, Japan
- Occupation: Actor
- Years active: 2013–present

Yusaku Mori (森優作, Mori Yusaku; born December 4, 1989) is a Japanese actor with credited acting roles in several film and television works, including series like Beppinsan and Alice in Borderland and films like Plan 75 and Shin Ultraman.

== Career ==
Yusaki Mori was born on December 4, 1989, in Osaka Prefecture. Before deciding to take up an acting career, he intended to become an interpreter in English, living and studying at the Brittin College in Manchester, England, between the ages of 17 and 20. He later transferred to the University of Sunderland. Upon returning to Japan, Mori's first studies into acting came under film director Tomoyuki Furumaya, subsequently portraying his first movie role in 2013.

Mori's breakthrough role came in the 2014 film Fires on the Plain, directed by filmmaker Shinya Tsukamoto, where he was cast in the role of a Japanese soldier enduring harsh conditions in the Pacific War on the island of Leyte, in the Philippines, during the Japanese occupation of that country. He stated in an interview in 2015 that he felt "anger" in a scene where people were killed in the battlefield, drawing attention to the then-recruitment of young men by ISIS and how his generation of Japanese men had not experienced war. This role earned Mori the Best New Actor Award at the Takasaki Film Festival.

Other minor or supporting roles in notable films were his characterizations in the 2017 kaiju film Shin Godzilla and the 2022 dystopian movie Plan 75, as well as the superhero film Shin Ultraman that same year.

In 2025, Mori won the Best Supporting Actor Award at the Japanese Movie Critics Awards for his role in the film Missing of director Keisuke Yoshida and starring actress Satomi Ishihara.

== External link ==
- Yusaku Mori at IMDb
