= Gemini (1999 film) =

- Japanese film poster
- Directed by: Shinya Tsukamoto
- Screenplay by: Shinya Tsukamoto
- Based on: Sōseiji: Aru Shikeiin ga Kyōkaishi ni Uchiaketa Hanashi by Edogawa Ranpo
- Produced by: Toshiaki Nakazawa; Taishi Nishimura
- Starring: Masahiro Motoki; Ryo; Yasutaka Tsutsui; Shiho Fujimura; Akaji Maro
- Cinematography: Shinya Tsukamoto
- Edited by: Shinya Tsukamoto
- Music by: Chu Ishikawa
- Production company: Sedic International / Marubeni
- Distributed by: Toho
- Release date: September 15, 1999 (Japan)
- Running time: 84 minutes
- Country: Japan
- Language: Japanese

Gemini (also known as Sōseiji; 双生児, lit. "Twins") is a 1999 horror film by Shinya Tsukamoto. It is loosely based on an Edogawa Ranpo story, which pursues Tsukamoto's theme of the brutally physical and animalistic side of human beings rearing its ugly head underneath a civilized veneer. These themes are also present in his previous films like Tetsuo: The Iron Man (1989) and Tokyo Fist (1995). Gemini has elements new to Tsukamoto at the time, including being set in the late Meiji era (1868–1912), no stop-motion photography, and a non-industrial setting.

== Plot ==
Set in Tokyo in 1910, the film centers Dr. Daitokuji Yukio (Masahiro Motoki), a former military doctor who has taken over a successful practice from his father and treats plague victims. His only problem is that his wife, Rin (Ryo), suffers from amnesia, and her past is unknown.

Both his parents die suddenly, killed by a mysterious stranger who looks just like him. His relationship with his wife worsens after he chooses to cure the mayor instead of destitute denizens of nearby ghettos. While isolated from his relatives, he one day faces the mysterious stranger who turns out to be his long-lost rejected twin, Sutekichi (Motoki). Seeking revenge, Sutekichi throws him into the garden's well and takes over his life.

The final conflict between the two brothers is realized when Yukio, forced into an animalistic existence in the well, reemerges, prompting the fratricidal fight for the love of the same woman, since it turns out (while he takes over Yukio's role) that Rin had actually once been Sutekichi's lover.

== Cast ==
- Masahiro Motoki – Yukio Daitokuji / Sutekichi
- Ryo – Rin
- Yasutaka Tsutsui – Yukio's father
- Shiho Fujimura – Yukio's mother
- Akaji Maro – Kakubê
- Masako Motai – Shige
- Renji Ishibashi – Beggar monk
- Tomorowo Taguchi – Middle-aged patient
- Tadanobu Asano – Revenger with sword
- Naoto Takenaka – Rich man

== Documentary ==
A behind-the-scenes documentary about the making of Gemini was produced and directed by Takashi Miike. The documentary, titled 塚本晋也が乱歩する (Tsukamoto Shinya ga Ranpo suru), is 17 minutes long.

== Release ==
Gemini received its official world premiere at the Venice Film Festival in 1999. It was released a few days later in Japan on September 15, 1999, where it was distributed by Toho. It was shown in the United States on November 5, 2000, at the Hawaii Film Festival. It has also received a rerelease by Third Window Films on Blu-ray in 2020.

== Reception ==
Variety gave the film a generally favourable review, stating that "this strikingly designed thriller is gripping despite a certain heavy-handedness and the director's customarily chaotic narrative approach." The Globe and Mail referred to Gemini as the "Pick of the Day" from its presentation at the Toronto International Film Festival, describing the film as "disconcerting, opaque, energetic, tedious, fascinating and flat-out insane in roughly equal measure" A review in the French film magazine Positif stated that Gemini had an awkward style that would leave viewers unable to get a real sense of fear and that the film had the complexity of a student film or a z-grade series. Contrarily, the media site Grimoire of Horror praised the frantic narrative for "absolutely breath taking plot twists, scenes of highly choreographed mayhem, beautifully erotic sequences, in-your-face class divide parables".

== See also ==
- List of Japanese films of 1999
