= Mr. Nelson, Did You Kill People? =

2026 film by Shinya Tsukamoto

- International promotional poster
- Japanese: ネルソンさん、あなたは人を殺しましたか？
- Directed by: Shinya Tsukamoto
- Written by: Shinya Tsukamoto
- Based on: Mr. Nelson, Did You Kill People? by Allen Nelson
- Produced by: Philippa Frey; Christopher Frey; Ken Ochiai; Yumiko Takebe
- Starring: Rodney Hicks; Geoffrey Rush; Mark Merphy; Tatyana Ali; Lily Franky
- Cinematography: Shinya Tsukamoto
- Edited by: Shinya Tsukamoto
- Production companies: Kino Films; Kinoshita Group; Cross Media International; Chanh Phuong Films
- Distributed by: Kino Films (Japan)
- Release dates: 4 September 2026 (Venice); 11 September 2026 (Japan)
- Running time: 116 minutes
- Countries: Japan; United States; Thailand; Vietnam
- Languages: English; Vietnamese

Mr. Nelson, Did You Kill People? (Japanese: ネルソンさん、あなたは人を殺しましたか？, Hepburn: Neruson san, anata wa hito o koroshimashitaka?) is a 2026 war-drama film written, edited, shot and directed by Shinya Tsukamoto, and based on Allen Nelson's memoir of same name, which has only been published in Japan. A co-production of Japan, United States, Thailand, and Vietnam, it follows U.S. veteran Allen Nelson (Rodney Hicks), who suffers with severe PTSD following the Vietnam War.

The film had its world premiere at the main competition of the 83rd Venice International Film Festival on 4 September 2026, where it won the Leoncino d'Oro Award. It was theatrically released in Japan by Kino Films on 11 September.

== Plot ==
Allen Nelson is a former U.S. Marine and veteran of the Vietnam War living in squalor and poverty with his cat. He suffers from extreme post-traumatic stress disorder, causing loud noises to trigger recollections of the war. He meets, by chance, Diane, a high school classmate who has become a schoolteacher, who invites Allen to speak in front of her classroom. He refuses at first, but seeing the cards made for him by the children, goes to speak at the school. He speaks nervously and does not know how to react when a child asks him "Mr. Nelson, did you kill people?"

Years in the future, Allen now lives with his wife Linda and stepson Sean. He meets weekly with Dr. Daniels, a counselor. In their sessions, Allen recounts his life up until that point - he had grown up with a violent step-father who was also a Navy veteran, and who left his family after a particularly violent incident. After joining the Marines, he went through brutal training, and was then taken to Okinawa, where US soldiers routinely abuse the locals, whom they do not see as human. Allen is then sent to Vietnam, where he participates in indiscriminate massacres of civilians thought to be sympathetic to the Viet Cong. His commanding sergeant cuts the ears off killed civilians and combatants, and every killed person needed to be piled up and counted. One captured Viet Cong soldier, when interrogated, only says that he is fighting for his freedom, and that Black people, not being free in the United States themselves, should fight for theirs, upon which he is executed. One day, during an ambush, Allen hides in a dugout where he sees a local girl giving birth, and decides not to kill her. He becomes conflicted about his role in the war, deciding to play soccer with the local children and giving food and medicine to Viet Cong-associated vendors who have stores outside the U.S. base. Every time a session ends, Dr. Daniels asks Allen why he killed people, to which Allen responds by saying that it was war and he had to kill them, or else he would have ended up dead.

Allen returns to the United States severely traumatized. Unable to live with his family due to the lights and sounds of the big city triggering his PTSD, he starts living in the squalid conditions he was seen in at the start of the film with his cat. When speaking in front of the class, he responds to the question of "Mr. Nelson, did you kill people?" by admitting that he did, crying. He looks to a poster of Martin Luther King in the classroom while the children hug him. He begins on several medications. Some time after, he meets Linda and marries her. One night, Allen hallucinates a Viet Cong soldier attacking him in his bed, before it is revealed that it was Linda all along.

Years later, in the 1980s, Allen has had a new daughter, Robin, and Sean is in high school. He is now much healthier mentally, but is still meeting with Dr. Daniels. When Sean brings back a recruitment poster from the U.S. military, Allen barges into the principal's office and demands that he be given a speech in front of Sean's class, recounting his memories from the war. Daniels asks him one last time why he killed people - he reveals that it is because he wanted to kill people, and was brought up in a culture of violence that made him want to inflict violence upon others. Allen makes a no-holds-barred speech in front of the class, capturing the attention of the children and urging them not to join the military.

Many years later, Allen has separated with Linda, but maintains good relationships with Sean and Robin. He meets with Dr. Daniels in a diner, where he reveals that he is now an internationally renowned speaker, invited to thousands of talks in Japan and Okinawa. His Japanese organizer, Kuroi, is organizing an event in Da Nang, which would be the first time in forty years Allen has been to Vietnam. He parts with Daniels and sets off to Vietnam. Before his speech in Da Nang, Allen breaks down in the bathroom, to which Kuroi tells him that his father, too, was a violent man who fought in Battle of the Philippines and routinely abused him, and seeing Allen's speeches has given him an understanding for how the war affected him. Allen steps onto the stage and talks about his guilt at the massacres he committed during the war.

== Cast ==
- Rodney Hicks as Allen Nelson
  - Mark Merphy as Young Nelson
- Geoffrey Rush as Dr. Daniels
- Tatyana Ali as Linda
- Lily Franky as Kuroi
- Johnny Serret as Supermarket Clerk

== Production ==
It marks Tsukamoto's second English-language feature film, following Tetsuo: The Bullet Man (2009).

Principal photography took place across the New York City, Okinawa, Vietnam and Japan.

== Release ==
The film had its world premiere in the main competition of the 83rd Venice International Film Festival on 4 September 2026. It was also selected to the Special Presentations section of the 2026 Toronto International Film Festival, where it had its North American premiere.

== Reception ==
On review aggregator Rotten Tomatoes, the film holds an approval rating of 27% based on 11 reviews, with an average rating of 5.1/10.

=== Accolades ===
Award	Date of ceremony	Category	Recipient(s)	Result	Ref.
Hochi Film Awards	December 2026	Best Picture	Mr. Nelson, Did You Kill People?	Pending	
Hochi Film Awards	December 2026	Best Director	Shinya Tsukamoto	Pending	
Nikkan Sports Film Awards	27 December 2026	Best Film	Mr. Nelson, Did You Kill People?	Pending	
Nikkan Sports Film Awards	27 December 2026	Best Director	Shinya Tsukamoto	Pending	
Venice Film Festival	11 September 2026	Leoncino d'Oro Award	Mr. Nelson, Did You Kill People?	Won	
