= Fires on the Plain (2014 film) =

2014 Japanese war film

- Film poster
- Directed by: Shinya Tsukamoto
- Written by: Shinya Tsukamoto
- Based on: Fires on the Plain by Shōhei Ōoka
- Produced by: Shinya Tsukamoto
- Starring: Shinya Tsukamoto; Yusaku Mori; Yuko Nakamura; Tatsuya Nakamura; Lily Franky
- Cinematography: Satoshi Hayashi; Shinya Tsukamoto
- Edited by: Shinya Tsukamoto
- Music by: Chu Ishikawa
- Production company: Kaijyu Theatre
- Distributed by: Shinnihon Eigasha
- Release dates: 2 September 2014 (Venice); 25 July 2015 (Japan)
- Running time: 87 minutes
- Country: Japan
- Languages: Japanese; Filipino

Fires on the Plain (Japanese: 野火, Hepburn: Nobi) is a 2014 Japanese war film written, produced, directed, edited, co-photographed by and starring Shinya Tsukamoto. The film is based on the 1951 anti-war novel Fires on the Plain, which was a semi-autobiographical work loosely based on author Shōhei Ōoka's experience in World War II. The novel was previously adapted in the 1959 film Fires on the Plain by Kon Ichikawa. The film premiered at the 71st Venice International Film Festival in 2014, and was released to the wider Japanese box office on 25 July 2015.

Fires on the Plain takes place during the final days of the Japanese occupation of the Philippines on the island of Leyte, after the American army had returned. The Japanese army remnants have taken to the jungle after being driven out of the main cities. The Filipinos, after suffering a brutal Japanese occupation, are in little mood to show mercy on their former tormentors, and light the titular bonfires for communication. Japanese soldiers are reduced to little more than bandits and murderers as their supplies dry up and they are encircled by the American-Filipino forces. A delirious and sick Private Tamura attempts to survive an aimless journey through the jungle as starvation drives the surviving soldiers to theft, madness, murder, suicide, and cannibalism.

== Plot ==
Private Tamura, a writer, is ridden with tuberculosis (TB) and is sent away from his company to the military hospital; the makeshift hospital refuses to accept him, as they are already full. Tamura is discharged back and forth until essentially ordered not to return and continue consuming supplies - he is ordered to commit suicide instead rather than return yet again.

On his own, Tamura finds that military discipline has faltered as the Japanese army disintegrates into the jungle and subsists largely on yams. Tamura steals food from some local Filipinos while encountering disturbing evidence of the Japanese army's collapse. A despondent soldier blows himself up with a grenade, while others lie dying from malnutrition or injuries on the path. Tamura encounters two soldiers, Yasuda and Nagamatsu, who attempt to trade cigarettes for yams to soldiers who pass by; he declines the cigarette but gives Nagamatsu a yam regardless out of pity. Tamura desperately forages whatever food he can, while American aircraft occasionally strafe the Japanese army remnants with bullets. At a seemingly abandoned church, Tamura stabs a dog. He sees a pile of Japanese corpses nearby, but investigates regardless; he finds a cache of salt hidden beneath a floorboard, but is found out by two Filipino civilians. In a panicked haze, he shoots one; the other runs away, with Tamura's halfhearted shots missing. Tamura runs away with his stolen food before reinforcements come, abandoning his rifle in the process. Tamura joins up with some remaining soldiers from a different company, where he is told that the whole army has orders to attempt to retreat to Palompon. Tamura travels with them for a time, trading his salt for yams; the other soldiers morbidly joke that they practiced cannibalism in order to survive during the New Guinea campaign, although Tamura is unsure if it is actually a joke or not. The retreat to Palompon requires crossing an open road; as Japanese soldiers attempt to cross it at nightfall, they are easily detected and gunned down by the Americans and Filipinos.

A famished Tamura prepares a white flag to attempt to surrender to a passing American jeep. Just before he runs out to surrender, he sees another Japanese soldier attempt the same act. The other soldier is gunned down by a vengeful Filipino woman in the jeep despite the American soldier's attempt to accept the surrender; Tamura perceives the shooter as the same woman he shot in the chapel. It is clear to Tamura that crossing the road to get to Palompon is impossible, so he returns the way he came into the jungle. Now delirious and perceiving corpses as talking to him, Tamura is found and saved from starvation by Nagamatsu, the soldier he had given a yam to earlier. Tamura is given bark, water, and "monkey meat". Tamura is bullied into giving his grenade to Yasuda, the canny superior whose leg was wounded and rolled up cigarettes for trade. After hearing a shot, Tamura chases after Nagamatsu; he sees that he had fired at a fleeing Filipino civilian, and that the "monkeys" he had been hunting were other humans. The loose alliance between Nagamatsu and Yasuda breaks down now that Yasuda has a grenade, as the two each fear that the other will kill them for their meat. After guarding the only source of clean water in the area, Yasuda is smoked out; Yasuda attempts to negotiate, but Nagamatsu shoots him. As Nagamatsu attempts to devour Yasuda, Tamura grabs his rifle. In the resulting struggle, he shoots Nagamatsu, who assures him before he dies that he knows Tamura will eat him.

The scene shifts to post-war Japan, where Tamura writes a memoir. Tamura claims to awaken at an American field hospital in his notes and not have remembered what happened after shooting Nagamatsu, but dry heaves at the horrible memory regardless.

== Cast ==
- Shinya Tsukamoto as Tamura
- Yūko Nakamura as Tamura's Wife
- Lily Franky as Yasuda
- Yusaku Mori as Nagamatsu
- Tatsuya Nakamura as Corporal

== Production and themes ==
Shinya Tsukamoto read the novel as a child and was taken with its power; he stated in an interview that he always wanted to make a movie version. He said that even his first movie, the 1989 cyberpunk film Tetsuo: The Iron Man, was influenced by Fires on the Plain; they both feature "normal" people who are drastically shaped by their environment. The film served as Tsukamoto's adaptation of the source material, not a remake of the 1959 film, with Tsukamoto himself stating his adaptation was "a cinematic expression of what I personally felt upon reading the original novel".

Tsukamoto originally wanted to make "an epic movie, with a big budget" but was turned down by the companies he approached. He made the project completely self-funded as an independent film instead. Tsukamoto also made the film due to the renewed interest in revising Article 9 of the Japanese Constitution and potential military involvement: "I wanted to remind younger audiences, for whom the horrors of WWII are a distant memory and may feel war is OK, the consequences of going to war." The movie was released a few weeks before the 70th anniversary of Japan's surrender, commemorated on August 15 in Japan; Tsukamoto arranged for encore screenings to happen the next year for the 71st anniversary of the war's end as well.

== Release ==
Fires on the Plain was selected to compete for the Golden Lion at the 71st Venice International Film Festival in 2014. It also served as the opening film of the 15th Tokyo Filmex, and was featured at the 23rd Raindance Film Festival. The film saw a wider release in the Japanese market in July 2015.

== Reception ==
On the review aggregator website Rotten Tomatoes, 88% of 8 critics' reviews are positive. Mark Schilling of The Japan Times gave the film a positive review. He noted that many Japanese war films indulged in a certain amount of soft nationalism, praising the sacrifice and intent of dying Japanese soldiers even if their cause was bad; Fires on the Plain does no such thing, showing undignified and starving soldiers trapped in a "hellish antechamber to death" lashing out at both innocents and each other. He praised Tsukamoto's work and noted he seemed to be inspired by Terrence Malick's style of portraying death and terror on-screen in a hallucinatory, terrifying fashion. Anthony Gates of EasternKicks also admired the film, comparing it to a more historical version of Mad Max. He also praised the vibrant color palette and Chu Ishikawa's musical score. Xan Brooks of The Guardian wrote that the movie successfully makes its point that "war is hell, particularly if you are fighting on the losing side" and called the film "brilliantly bonkers". Deborah Young of The Hollywood Reporter opined that Fires on the Plain felt like a "relentlessly cruel and gory horror film" and further stated, "it's not an easy watch but a highly rewarding one that most festival audiences will be anxious to sit through, thanks to Tsukamoto's reputation." While Pierce Conran of Screen Anarchy felt that the film could in no way match the previous 1959 adaptation of the novel, he still praised its "frenetic and almost crude aesthetic" and effective mix of "shaky, high-contrast photography, boundless psychological despair and liberal doses of cheap but stomach churning gore."

In a middling review written for Asian Movie Pulse, Panos Kotzathanasis commented that the focus on grotesque spectacle and splatter at times felt excessive, and concluded, "Fires on the Plain is not a masterpiece, but the extremity in the presentation of the anti-war message definitely sets it apart as a cult spectacle that fans of the genre will definitely appreciate." In less positive reviews, Peter Debruge of Variety felt that the movie was more of a horror film to a degree that compromised its anti-war message and its realism, comparing the cinematography's lingering on horrible deaths to an "amateur zombie movie". Debruge also felt that Tsukamoto's acting performance was weak and one-note.

In the Japanese film press, Fires on the Plain won the second prize at the 25th Japanese Professional Movie Awards for movies released in 2015 in Japan. It also won 5th place at the 37th Yokohama Film Festival.
