= Killing (film) =

2018 film

- Film poster
- Directed by: Shinya Tsukamoto
- Written by: Shinya Tsukamoto
- Produced by: Shinya Tsukamoto
- Starring: Sosuke Ikematsu; Yū Aoi; Tatsuya Nakamura; Ryūsei Maeda; Shinya Tsukamoto
- Cinematography: Satoshi Hayashi; Shinya Tsukamoto
- Edited by: Shinya Tsukamoto
- Music by: Chu Ishikawa
- Production company: Kaijyu Theatre
- Distributed by: Shin Nippon Films
- Release date: 7 September 2018 (Venice)
- Running time: 80 minutes
- Country: Japan
- Language: Japanese

Killing (Japanese: 斬、, Hepburn: Zan) is a 2018 Japanese drama film directed by Shinya Tsukamoto. It was selected to be screened in the main competition section of the 75th Venice International Film Festival.

== Plot ==
Mokunoshin Tsuzuki is a young wandering samurai without a master. He stops in a village of poor peasants to protect them and help them harvest rice. He trains himself by crossing swords with Ichisuke, the teenage son of his host family. One day, an elderly samurai named Sawamura, comes to the village, determined to recruit other warriors to go to Kyoto and fight in the civil war. Tsuzuki agrees to follow him. Sawamura also welcomes the enthusiastic but inexperienced Ichisuke, even though Yu, the latter's sister, is against it. However, a group of disbanded outlaws also arrive at the village, led by Sezaemon Genda. Tsuzuki initially manages to maintain good relations with Genda, but Ichisuke provokes the outlaws, who beat him. Against the advice of Tsuzuki, who would like to keep the peace, Sawamura decides to defend the honor of Ichisuke, who is now one of his men. The samurai thus slaughters a large part of Genda's gang. The survivors retaliate by killing Ichisuke. Yu, devastated by her loss, urges Tsuzuki to avenge her brother. But Tsuzuki, who has never killed anyone, fails to deal with the outlaws, who come to rape Yu in front of him. Only Sawamura's intervention saves them: the older man kills Genda and the other bandits, but is seriously injured. When it comes time to leave for Kyoto, however, Tsuzuki is not found. Sawamura pursues him: Tsuzuki has evaded his duties, and therefore must be put to death. When the two warriors finally come face to face, however, it is Tsuzuki who kills Sawamura.

== Cast ==
- Sosuke Ikematsu as Mokunoshin Tsuzuki
- Yū Aoi as Yu
- Tatsuya Nakamura as Sezaemon Genda
- Ryūsei Maeda as Ichisuke
- Shinya Tsukamoto as Jirozaemon Sawamura
