= Nami Tsukamoto =

Japanese ballet dancer and film actress

Nami Tsukamoto (柄本 奈美, Tsukamoto Nami; born September 7, 1979 in Shizuoka Prefecture) is a Japanese ballet dancer.

== Career ==
Tsukamoto started ballet at the age of 7, studying at the Tachibana Ballet School.

She is a member of Asami Maki Ballet Tokyo, and is a client of the agency Bound Promotion. (in Japanese)

In addition to ballet, Tsukamoto also performs as a film actress.

== Filmography ==
=== Film ===
Year	Title	Role	Notes
2004	Vital	Ryōko Ōyama	

=== TV commercials ===
- Daio Paper Corporation - Elis Megami
