= Tetsuo II: Body Hammer =

1992 Japanese cyberpunk horror film by Shinya Tsukamoto

- Japanese release poster
- Directed by: Shinya Tsukamoto
- Written by: Shinya Tsukamoto
- Produced by: Hiromi Aihara; Hiroshi Koizumi; Fumio Kurokawa; Fuminori Shishido; Nobuo Takeuchi; Shinya Tsukamoto
- Starring: Tomorowo Taguchi; Shinya Tsukamoto
- Cinematography: Fumikazu Oda; Shinya Tsukamoto; Katsunori Yokoyama
- Edited by: Shinya Tsukamoto
- Music by: Chu Ishikawa
- Production companies: Kaijyu Theatre; F2; Toshiba EMI
- Distributed by: Toshiba EMI; There's Enterprise
- Release date: February 1992 (Yubari)
- Running time: 82 minutes
- Country: Japan
- Language: Japanese
- Box office: $2,550

Tetsuo II: Body Hammer (鉄男II Body Hammer) is a 1992 Japanese cyberpunk body horror thriller film directed by Shinya Tsukamoto. It is a bigger-budget sequel to Tsukamoto's 1989 film Tetsuo: The Iron Man, utilizing similar themes and ideas as his first film, and largely the same cast, though the story is not a direct continuation of that of its predecessor. In Body Hammer, a Japanese salaryman, played by cult actor Tomorowo Taguchi, finds his body transforming into a weapon through sheer rage after his son is kidnapped by a gang of violent thugs.

Although not as well received as its predecessor, Body Hammer won the Critic's Award at the 3rd Yubari International Fantastic Film Festival in February 1992.

A third installment, entitled The Bullet Man, was released in May 2010.

== Plot ==
Yatsu - known as "The Metal Fetishist" or "The Guy" - holds out his index finger like a gun and fires at a man, killing him.

Taniguchi Tomoo, a salaryman married with a woman named Kana and with a son named Minori, does not have any memories before his adoption at eight years old. On a trip out, two skinheads use an injection gun to inject him with an unknown substance and kidnap Minori. After a chase, they retreat, leaving the boy unharmed. Rattled by the encounter, during which he thought his son was killed, Tomoo starts working out and is suddenly capable of enormous feats of strength.

Later, Minori is kidnapped again from his house. Tomoo chases the kidnappers to a roof where he again finds himself hanging on the edge, close to death. However, this time he manages to pull himself up, only to be told the skinhead already threw Minori off. Enraged, Tomoo unconsciously transforms his arm into a cannon. He shoots at the skinhead, who holds Minori in front of him, causing Tomoo to kill his own son. The skinhead escapes, leaving a distraught Taniguchi and Kana, who saw everything.

The skinheads arrive at their hideout, where their accomplices work out lifting enormous weights. They meet the Mad Scientist, return the injection gun, and report the result of the experiment. The skinheads kidnap Tomoo, and the Mad Scientist manipulates his memories, furthering his change from man to machine. Yatsu, the leader of this cult, informs the Mad Scientist that his only goal is destruction and that every cult member will get an injection. Believing the injection gun is complete, Yatsu kills the Mad Scientist. Before he can kill Tomoo, he escapes.

All cult members inject themselves and rapidly transform. One cult member pursues Taniguchi. In an abandoned factory, the skinhead tells Tomoo that they all want to be made into gods by Yatsu. The cult member taunts Tomoo by mentioning his son's death, causing him to transform and kill him. Later, it is revealed that the injection gun is imperfect and all cult members' bodies are rapidly rusting.

Kana discovers that Tomoo's injection was actually blocked by his pocket organizer and that he has had this ability all along. When he gets home, she panics and flees the house, only to be kidnapped.

Yatsu tells Kana about her husband, who possesses incredible power but chooses not to use it unless he's pushed. Tomoo eventually finds the cult's hideout. Yatsu talks to Taniguchi, then seemingly kills Kana. Her death pushes Tomoo completely over the edge and he fully transforms. Yatsu and Taniguchi fight and Tomoo eventually gains the upper hand. Yatsu shoots a cable into Tomoo, linking their minds.

Tomoo and Yatsu are actually brothers, whose father wanted to create the perfect human weapon. He trained his sons with guns, then made the guns part of them. The boys witness their father killing their mother in a bizarre sex ritual involving the woman sucking on a gun. Tomoo lost his mind, transformed his arm into a cannon and repeatedly shot at his parents while grinning. He had been repressing all memories of his past because of this traumatizing experience.

Tomoo and Yatsu merge into a giant half-human, half-metal creature. Tomoo begs Kana to inject him with the gun that will make him rust to death, but she refuses to harm him. The Tomoo/Yatsu creature merges with the cultists and turns into an armoured vehicle that moves through the city. Kana holds on to the side of the machine as it travels down a highway.

An unknown amount of time later, Kana, Tomoo - in his human form - and his son are walking through the desolate ruins of a city. Kana remarks on how peaceful the place has become.

== Cast ==
- Tomorowo Taguchi as Taniguchi Tomoo
- Shinya Tsukamoto as Yatsu
- Nobu Kanaoka as Kana
- Kim Soo-Jin as Taniguchi's Father
- Hideaki Tezuka as Big Skinhead
- Tomoo Asada as Young Skinhead
- Torauemon Utazawa as Mad Scientist

== Reception ==
Film critic Roger Ebert gave the film 3/4 stars: "When Shinya Tsukamoto was growing up in Tokyo, there were still green and open spaces in the city--but now he sees it transformed into a towering, compacted mass of steel and concrete".
