= Akiko Monō =

Japanese actress and model

- 桃生 亜希子
- Born: 2 April 1976 (age 48); Kanagawa, Japan
- Occupation(s): actress and model

Akiko Monō (桃生 亜希子, Monō Akiko, born 2 April 1976 in Kanagawa, Japan) is a Japanese actress and model.

Monō did spots for, amongst others, Nike, before Hiroyuki Nakano caught sight of her in a video clip and cast her in Samurai Fiction, her film debut. She has since worked with Nakano in his Stereo Future and the short film Slow is Beautiful.

== Filmography ==
- Samurai Fiction (1998)
- Stereo Future (2001)
- Kakuto (2003)
- Lost in Translation (2005)
- Colors (2006)
- Youkai Kidan (2007)
- Baumkuchen (2007)
- Konna Otonano Onnanoko (2007)
- United Red Army (2007)
- Anna No Monogatari (2007)
- After School (2008)
- Heaven's Door (2009)
- The Code/Angou (2009)
- Yatterman (2009)
- Tetsuo: The Bullet Man (2010)
- Ugly (2011)
