= Horror films of Asia =

Film subgenre

Horror films in Asia have been noted as being inspired by national, cultural or religious folklore, particularly beliefs in ghosts or spirits. In Asian Horror, Andy Richards writes that there is a "widespread and engrained acceptance of supernatural forces" in many Asian cultures, and suggests this is related to animist, pantheist and karmic religious traditions, as in Buddhism and Shintoism. Although Chinese, Japanese, Thai and Korean horror has arguably received the most international attention, Asian horror films also makes up a considerable proportion of Cambodian and Malaysian cinema.

== Cambodia ==
Horror films in Cambodia, first popular in the 1970s, have received renewed attention in Cambodian film making since the resurgence of the local industry in 2003. Horror is one of three popular genres into which most Cambodian films can be loosely grouped, the other two being period pieces and melodrama/romantic drama. The fledgling Cambodian industry of the mid 2000s looked to capitalize on the world-wide popularity of Japanese horror films which have heavily influenced Cambodian horror films. Common themes are ghost or spirit hauntings, possession, folk mythology and revenge by supernatural means. The storytelling takes a slower pace than Western horror and relies on suspense, a pervasive sense of doom and dread, and psychologically disturbing events and situations. Unlike its Japanese counterparts however, many Cambodian horror films also feature over the top gore as seen in Western horror.

== Hong Kong ==
The Hong Kong film industry has long been associated with genre cinema, specifically for action films. The Hong Kong horror films are generally broad and often feature demons, wraiths and reanimated corpses and have been described by authors Gary Bettinson and Daniel Martin as "generically diffuse and resistant to Western definitions." This was due to Hong Kong cinema often creating various hybrid films which mesh traditional horror films with elements of other genres such as A Chinese Ghost Story (1987), which led to Hong Kong critic Chen Yu to suggest that this form was "one more indication of the Hong Kong cinema's inability to establish a proper horror genre."

Various interpretations of the Hong Kong horror film have included Bettinson and Martin stating that Hong Kong films frequently prioritize comedy and romance over fear. Author Felicia Chan described Hong Kong cinema as being noted for its extensive use of parody and pastiche and the horror and ghost films of Hong Kong often turn to comedy and generally follow forms of ghost erotica and jiangshi (transl. stiff corpses). Early horror-related cinema in Mandarin and Cantonese featured ghost stories that occasionally had rational explanations. The literary source of Hong Kong horror films is Pu Songling's Strange Tales from a Chinese Studio, a series of short stories with supernatural themes written in the 17th century. Unlike Western stories, Pu focuses on the value of the human form which is essential for reincarnation, leading to stories about ghosts such as Fox spirit trying to seal a mortal man's life essence, usually through sex. This led to a relatively large degree of Hong Kong horror films, even more than their Korean and Japanese counterparts, featuring chimeric creatures exhibiting bodily features of various animals. According to author Stephen Teo, corporeal 'trans-substantiation', such as in the form of a human to werewolf or vampire to bat, is "unthinkable in Chinese culture since the rule of pragmatism requires that one's physical, human shape be kept intact for reincarnation and for the wheel of life to keep revolving"

Early Hong Kong horror films of the 1950s were often described by terms such as shenguai (gods/spirits and the strange/bizarre), qi guai (strange) and shen hua (godly story). Most of these films involved a man meeting a neoi gwei (female ghost), followed by a flashback illustrating how the woman had died and usually concluded with a happy ending involving reincarnation and romance. Examples include the ghost story Beauty Raised from the Dead (1956) and The Nightly Cry of the Ghost (1957) which suggests the supernatural but concludes with a rational explanation for the proceedings. Other trends included humorous variations such as The Dunce Bumps into a Ghost (1957) as well as films about snake demons that were imitating films from the Philippines and made co-productions with the country with Sanda Wong (1955) and The Serpent's Girls' Worldy Fancies (1958).

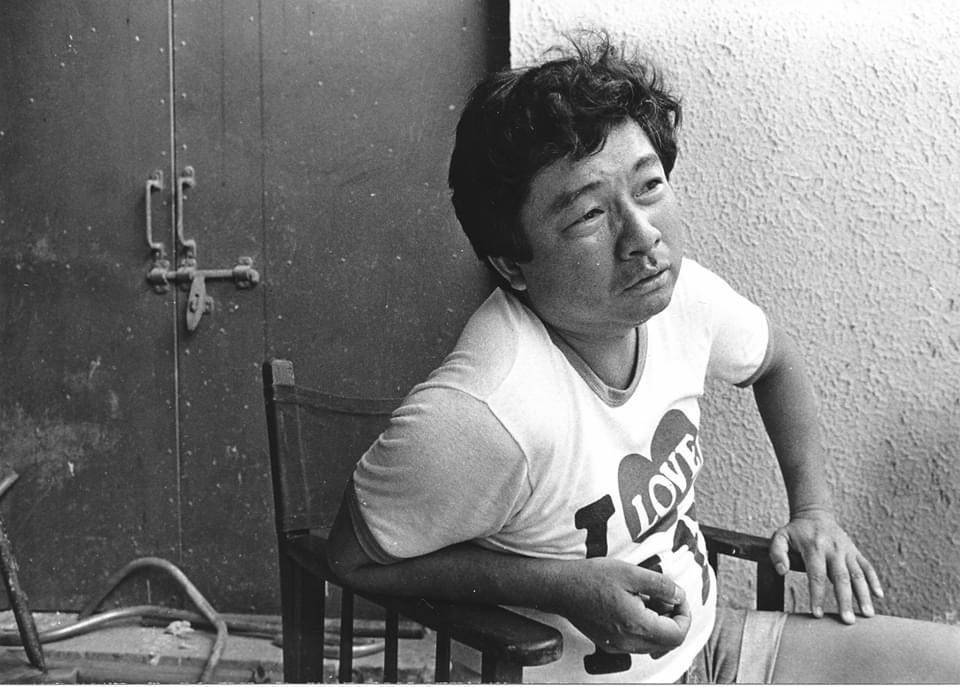
Director Kuei Chih-Hung in 1979, one of the few Hong Kong directors to specialize in horror films

Other Early works include The Enchanting Shadow (1960) based on Pu's work, which did not create a cycle of ghost films. In the 1970s films such as the Shaw Brothers and Hammer Film Productions co-production Legend of the 7 Golden Vampires would not take off worldwide and not produce cycles of similar horror films. King Hu's films such as Touch of Zen would touch upon Pu's work, including plot points of fox spirits, while his other work such as Legend of the Mountain would be full on ghost stories.

Veteran stuntman, actor and director Sammo Hung decided to blend horror with more humour, leading to Encounters of the Spooky Kind (1980). The film was popular at the box office leading to several kung-fu-oriented ghost comedies. Directors ranging from Ann Hui to Tsui Hark would all dabble with the genre, with Sammo Hung producing Mr. Vampire and Tsui Hark producing A Chinese Ghost Story, which would be stories from Pu Songling's work.

According to Gary Bettinson and Daniel Martin, the critical attitude towards Hong Kong horror was that it reached its commercial and artistic peaks in the 1980s, partially in response to the audience's decline in the dominance of kung fu films. The rise of Asian horror films in the 2000s has been described by Laikwan Pang in Screen as setting Hong Kong horror films back, stating that "once famous for churning out hundreds of formulaic horror films have almost completely died out - precisely because of the industry's fraught efforts to adapt to a Chinese market and its policy environment." In 2003, author Daniel O'Brien stated that the Hong Kong film industry still turned out horror films. Still, the number of them turned out much lower, with the genre rarely attracting major filmmakers and operating on the low-budget side of the industry with films like the Troublesome Night series, which had 18 entries. In 2018, Bettinson and Martin found that the Hong Kong horror film had become nostalgic and contemporary, noting films like Rigor Mortis (2013) as referencing the older Mr. Vampire film while also as adapting to the shifting global market for Asian cinema.

=== Exploitation and Category III ===
In the 1970s a shift in style and type of Hong Kong horror films began being produced with more explicit depictions of sex. Actor Kam Kwok-leung who appeared in some of these films such as the Shaw Brothers produced The Killer Snakes (1974) stated that the studio's "attitude was rather shameless; they threw in nude scenes or sex scenes regardless of the genre [...] As long as they could insert these scenes, they didn't mind throwing logic out the window. The Killer Snakes was no exception" The film was directed by Kuei Chih-Hung, it was his first horror film and led to him being one of the few Hong Kong directors to specialize in horror. These films were sometimes described as exploitation, characterized by their gratuitous or excessive nudity, extreme violence, and gore are generally regarded by critics as "bad" rather than quality or serious cinema. Keui would return to horror in various films after such as Ghost Eyes (1974), Hex (1980), Hex vs Witcraft (1980), Hex After Hex (1982) Curse of Evil (1982) and The Boxer's Omen (1984). These films were swept aside by the late 1980s when an even more raw form of exploitation cinema arose with the Category III film creation in 1988. Category III films from the era such as Dr. Lamb (1992) and The Untold Story (1993) were linked to horror from their excessive violence and blood-letting of their serial killer central characters.

Other horror films borrowing from Western trends were made such as Dennis Yu's two films The Beasts (1980) resembling Last House on the Left and The Imp (1981), Patrick Tam's Love Massacre (1981) resembling the American slasher film trend. Later cases of the genre often exclude the ghost story style, such as The Untold Story (1993) and Dream Home (2010) which have lead characters within scientific explanation.

== India ==
The Cinema of India produces the largest amount of films in the world, ranging from Bollywood (Hindi cinema based in Mumbai) to other regions such as West Bengal and Tamil Nadu. Unlike Hollywood and most Western cinematic traditions, horror films produced in India incorporate romance, song-and-dance, and other elements in the "masala" format, where as many genres as possible are bundled into a single film. Odell and Le Blanc described the Indian horror film as "a popular, but minor part of the country's film output" and that "has not found a true niche in mainstream Indian cinema." These films are made outside of Mumbai, and are generally seen as disreputable to their more respectable popular cinema. As of 2007, the Central Board of Film Certification, India's censorship board has stated films "pointless or unavoidable scenes of violence, cruelty and horror, scenes of violence intended to provide entertainment and such scene that may have the effect of desensitising or dehumanizing people are not shown." The earliest Indian horror films were films about ghosts and reincarnation or rebirth such as Mahal (1949). These early films tended to be spiritual pieces or tragic dramas opposed to having visceral content. While prestige films from Hollywood productions had been shown in Indian theatres, the late 1960s had seen a parallel market for minor American and European co-productions to films like the James Bond film series and the films of Mario Bava. In the 1970s and 1980s, the Ramsay Brothers created a career in the lower reaches of the Bombay film industry making low-budget horror films, primarily influenced by Hammer's horror film productions, with little known about their production or distribution history. The Ramsay Brothers were a family of seven brothers who made horror films that were featured monsters and evil spirits that mix in song and dance sections as well as comic interludes. Most of their films played at smaller cinema in India, with Tulsi Ramsay, one of the brothers, later stating "Places where even the trains don't stop, that's where our business was." Their horror films are generally dominated by low-budget productions, such as those by the Ramsay Brothers. Their most successful film was Purana Mandir (1984), which was the second highest-grossing film in India that year. The influence of American productions would have an effect on later Indian productions such as The Exorcist which would lead to films involving demonic possession such as Gehrayee (1980). India has also made films featuring zombies and vampires that drew from American horror films opposed to indigenous myths and stories. Other directors, such as Mohan Bhakri made low budget highly exploitive films such as Cheekh (1985) and his biggest hit, the monster movie Khooni Mahal (1987).

Horror films are not self-evident categories in Tamil and Telugu films and it was only until the late 1980s that straight horror cinema was regularly produced with films like Uruvam (1991), Sivi (2007), and Eeram (2009) were released. The first decade of the twenty-first century saw a flurry of commercially successful Telugu horror films like A Film by Aravind (2005), Mantra (2007), and Arundhati (2009) were released. Ram Gopal Varma made films that generally defied the conventions of popular Indian cinema, making horror films like Raat (1992) and Bhoot (2003), with the latter film not containing and comic scenes or musical numbers. In 2018, the horror film Tumbbad premiered in the critics' week section of the 75th Venice International Film Festival—the first ever Indian film to open the festival.

== Indonesia ==
Indonesian horror are fictions and films of the horror genre produced by the Indonesian film industry. Often inspired by local folklore and religious elements, Indonesian horror films have been produced in the country since the 1960s. After a hiatus during the Suharto era in the 1990s, when censorship affected production, Indonesian horror films continued being produced following Reformasi in 1998.

== Japan ==
The Japanese film industry began in the late 1800s with its most films from the 1920s to the 1970s being made through its studio system. Following World War II, Donald Richie noted that directors and screenwriters were no longer as interested in subjects that promoted a rosy future. This led to development of ghost story and monster movies being made in Japan during the 1950s. The term "horror" as a genre, only began circulating in Japan in the 1960s in press and everyday language. Prior to this, horror fiction as it may be known was referred to with terms like "mystery", "terror", and "dread". According to manga author and critic Yoshihiro Yonezawa, the first boom of horror manga with the success of the Kaiki shōsetsu zenshū' and the success of the British horror films from Hammer Films which began circulating in Japan and gaining popularity. Due to the circulation of these magazines, a growing interest in the supernatural developed, inspired by traditional Japanese ghost stories (kaidan) such as Yotsuya Kaidan as well as classical Japanese woodcut prints with themes of Japanese ghosts.

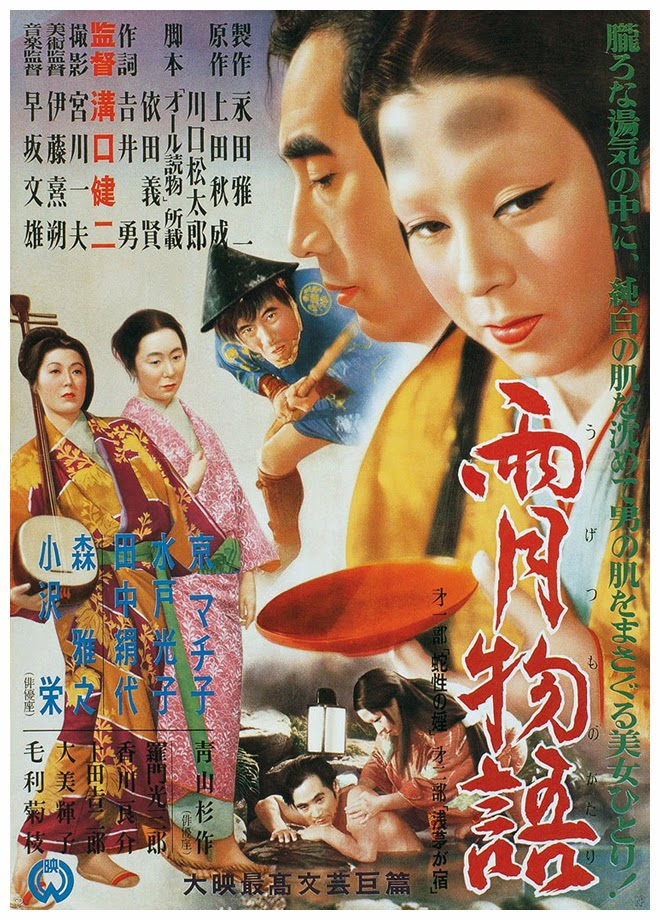
Ugetsu (1953)

Colette Balmain in her book Introduction to Japanese Horror Film stated the two most important films that would influence the growth of the horror genre were Ugetsu (1953), exploring fears around modernization, and Godzilla (1954), with its monster and its atomic breath reminding about the devastation caused by nuclear weapons. Ugetsu would also lay the groundwork for several forms of Japanese horror films. This included gothic ghost stories which accounted for most of Japanese horror films of the 1950s and 1960s, the erotic-themed ghost story films of the as well as later Japanese ghost story films like Ring (1998) and Ju-On: The Grudge. Ugetsu would borrow from traditional Japanese theatre forms such as Kabuki and Noh . Noh was marked for estrained understatement and abstraction with more focus on emotion than narrative of dialogue which would be reflected in later Japanese films like Onibaba (1964) and Kuroneko (1968).

In 1964, Shochiku released Daydream, the first Japanese New Wave film to have a blatantly erotic story. These films later became known as pink films, a term of American origin applied to low-budget and low-profile films. These softcore films helped struggling studios with the first wave of them being between 1964 and 1972. One sub-genre of these films was the erotic ghost story, which were less explicit than the usual pink cinema. These films often featured wronged women, such as the vengeful ghostly cat woman in Kuroneko (1968). Stories of ghost cats and similar creatures were part of the sub-genre known as bakeneko mono, or monster-cat tales starting with The Ghost Cat of Otama Pond (1960).

In 1985, the Japanese film producer Ogura Satoru developed the series and directed the first installment: Guinea Pig: Devil's Experiment. The series was controversial in Japan, due in part to the public scrutiny the videos faced after the capture of Tsutomu Miyazaki, a child murderer who had the films in his collection. The series circulated enough within horror film fan circles that in a March 1994 issue of Fangoria, a fan wrote in to ask the magazine to shift its focus toward underground films such as "the notorious gorefests from Japan [...] the infamous Guinea Pig series." The magazine responded that the independent film market was fading away and that major studios had taken over the b-film industry and "that is where the power - and commercial success - lies. Guinea Pig is not the future of horror." Jay McRoy, author of Nightmare Japan: Contemporary Japanese Horror Cinema declared that films like Toshiharu Ikeda's Evil Dead Trap (1988) and Tetsuo: The Iron Man (1989) "spurred the emergence of an increasingly visceral and graphically violent wave of Japanese horror films" with the latter film being "one of the most influential Japanese horror films ever produced.

Author and critic Kim Newman described the release of Hideo Nakata's Ring (1998) as one of the major "cultural phenomenons" in the horror film in the late 1990s. Along with the South Korean film Whispering Corridors (1998), it was a major hit across Asia leading to sequels and similar ghost stories from Asian countries. With more than 24 million sales worldwide, the Resident Evil video game franchise began in 1996. Several Japanese productions involving zombies followed the games success, such as Wild Zero (1999) and Versus (2000), and Junk (2000). These films zombies resembled the monsters from the 1970s such Dawn of the Dead (1978) and Zombi 2 (1979). In 2003, independent films had overtaken studio-produced films with 234 of the 287 total films released in 2003 were independent. The independent Japanese zombie film One Cut of the Dead (2017) became a sleeper hit in Japan, receiving general acclaim worldwide and making Japanese box office history by earning over a thousand times its budget.

== South Korea ==
The Korean horror film originated in the 1960s and became a more prominent part of the countries film production in the early 2000s. While ghosts have appeared as early as 1924 in Korean film, attempting to chart the history of the genre from this period was described by Alison Peirse and Daniel Martin, the authors of "Korean Horror Cinema" as "problematic", due to the control of the Japanese colonial government blocking artistic or politically independent films. Regardless of settings or time period, many Korean horror films such as Song of the Dead (1980) have their stories focused on female relationships, rooted in Korean Confucianism tradition with an emphasis on biological families. Despite the influence of folklore in some films, there is no key single canon to define the Korean horror film. Korean horror cinema is also defined by melodrama, as it does in most of Korean cinema.

The Housemaid (1960) is widely credited as initiating the first horror cycle in Korean cinema, which involved films of the 1960s about supernatural revenge tales, focused on cruelly murdered women who sought out revenge. Several of these films are in dept to Korean folklore and ghost stories, with stories of animal transformation. Traces of international cinema are found in early Korean horror cinema. such as Shin Sang-ok's Madame White Snake (1960) from the traditional Chinese folktale Legend of the White Snake. Despite bans of Japanese cultural products that lasted from 1945 to 1998, the influence of Japanese culture are still found in Kaibyō eiga (ghost cats) themed films, such as A Devilish Homicide (1965) and Ghosts of Chosun (1970). Other 1960s films featured narratives involving kumiho such as The Thousand Year Old Fox (Cheonnyeonho) (1969). These tales based on folklore and ghosts continued into the 1970s. Korea also produced giant monster films that received release in the United States such as Yongary, Monster from the Deep (1967) and Ape (1976).

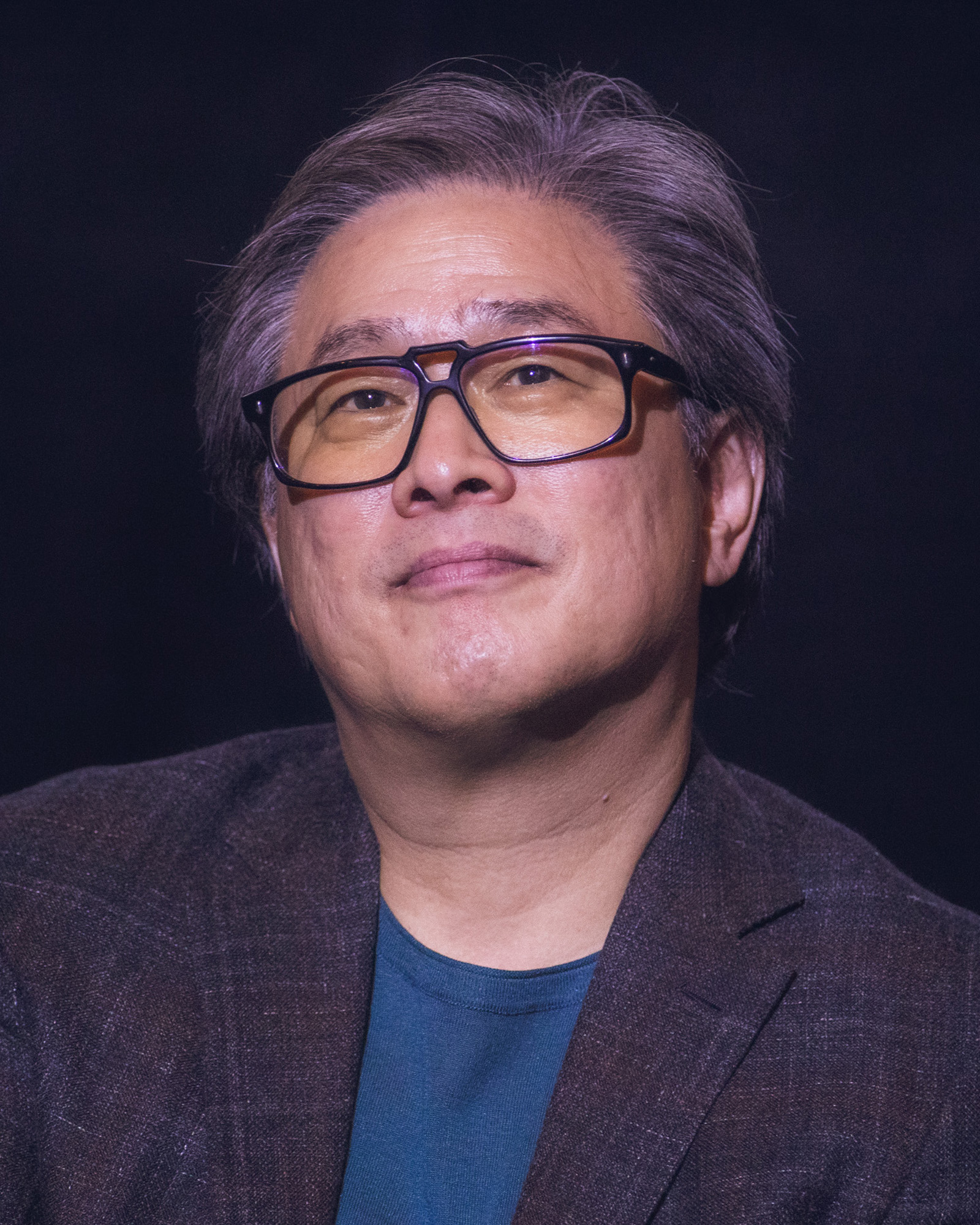
Park Chan-wook, the director of Thirst (2009), one of the many varied Korean horror films from the early 21st century

By the end of the 1970s, the Korean horror film entered a period known commonly as the "dark time" for South Korean cinema with audience attracted to Hong Kong and American imports. The biggest influence on this was the "3S" policy adopted by the Chun Doo-hwan government which promoted the production of "sports, screen and sex" for the film industry leading to more relaxed censorship leading to a boom in Erotic Korean films. Horror films followed this trend with Suddenly at Midnight (1981), a reimagining of The Housemaid (1960). As of 2013, many pre-1990 Korean horror films are only available through the Korean Film Archive (KOFA) in Seoul. It was not until the 1998 release of Whispering Corridors was the Korean horror film reinvigorated, with its style containing traces of traditional Korean cinema (culturally specific themes and melodrama) but also the American pattern of making a franchise of horror films, as the film received four sequels. Since the film's release, Korean horror films had had strong diversity with gothic tales like A Tale of Two Sisters (2003), gory horror films like Bloody Reunion (2006), horror comedy (To Catch a Virgin Ghost (2004)), vampire films (Thirst (2009)), and independent productions (Teenage Hooker Became a Killing Machine (2000)). These films varied in popularity with Ahn Byeong-ki's Phone (2002) reaching the top ten in the domestic box office sales in 2002 while in 2007, no locally produced Korean horror films were financially successful with local audiences. In 2020, Anton Bitel declared in Sight & Sound that South Korea was one of the international hot spots for horror film production in the last decade, citing the international and popular releases of films like Train to Busan (2016), The Odd Family: Zombie on Sale (2019) Peninsula (2020) and The Wailing (2016).

== Thailand ==
Thai Horror is a horror fiction derived from Thailand belief and culture. Apart from traditional jump scares, Thai Horror narrate the story through the elements of Thai culture, social issues, and everyday struggles. It uniquely blends real-world and supernatural terror. Its root is strongly influenced by Thai folklore, spiritual beliefs, and religion traditions. Many works of Thai horror draw upon traditional belief of supernatural being, collectively known as “phi”, the term refers to mysterious beings, ranging from ghosts to divine spirit. Generally, Thai horror played on the evil side of phis which are vengeful and malevolent, it is believed that these spirits can cause harm that can lead to sickness and gruesome death.

Thai horror gained wider popularity in the late 20th and early 21st centuries with notable films such as Nang Nak (1999) a retelling of the Mae Nak Phra Khanong Legend and Shutter (2004). Horror films became one of Thailand most internationally recognizable movie genres, receiving global attention and influencing other Asian horror productions.

Thai horror also appears in other medias such as television series, literature, and digital media while continuously played on the same topic of spiritual beliefs, folklore, and religion tradition, it is reinterpreted to reach more modern audiences.
