= Third Window Films =

UK film distributor

Third Window Films is a UK-based distributor of movies from East Asia founded in 2005. They have provided distribution for numerous award-winning films, such as Oasis (Winner of Marcello Mastroianni Award, FIPRESCI Prize Signis Award and Special Director's Award at the Venice Film Festival), Himizu (Winner of the Marcello Mastroianni Award at the Venice Film Festival),Villain (Best Actress winner at the Montreal World Film Festival), Kotoko (Winner of the Best Film Award in the Orizzonti of the Venice Film Festival), Memories of Matsuko (Best Actress, Best Editing and Best Music at Japan Academy Award) and more.

Although receiving cult status in the UK for releasing such films as Love Exposure, Cold Fish, Fish Story, Tetsuo: The Iron Man and others, many of Third Window Films' titles are blockbusters that feature household names in their native countries. For instance, Guns & Talks features Korean idol Won Bin star of Mother, For Love's Sake by Takashi Miike played Out of Competition at the Cannes Film Festival, Vulgaria was the highest grossing Hong Kong film of 2012 and Confessions held the number one spot in Japan for a whole month despite strong competition from Sex and the City 2 and Iron Man 2 and was Japan's official nomination for the 2010 Academy Awards.

Third Window Films also has handled worldwide sales and distribution for many other titles which have been international and domestic successes, such as Shinichiro Ueda's One Cut of the Dead, Junta Yamaguchi's Beyond the Infinite Two Minutes, Junichi Yasuda's A Samurai in Time and more. Third Window Films have also worked heavily in the remastering and re-releasing of many long-lost Japanese classics such as Mermaid Legend, Door, The Legend of The Stardust Brothers, The Crazy Family (1984 film), etc.

In 2011, Third Window Films opened a branch office in Japan, Third Window Films Japan, to handle international co-productions. Their first co-production, The Land of Hope directed by Sion Sono, won the NETPAC Award at the Toronto International Film Festival in 2012.

In 2013, they created the first international large-scale co-production for a Japanese comedy, with Yosuke Fujita's Fuku-chan of FukuFuku Flats. The project brought in Tucker Film in Italy, Joint Entertainment in Taiwan, Rapid Eye Movies in Germany and partnered them with Japan's TV Man Union and Phantom Films. Third Window Films setup distribution deals as well for all 5 countries.

In 2015, they fully produced the Japanese independent film Lowlife Love (Gesu no Ai) directed by Uchida Eiji. The film is a 100% production of Third Window Films and stars many well-known Japanese actors such as Denden, Shugo Oshinari, Kiyohiko Shibukawa, Kanji Tsuda, Yoshihiko Hosoda and Houka Kinoshita.

They followed up Lowlife Love with the 2017 production Love and Other Cults also directed by Uchida Eiji. The film was also an independent production of Third Window Films and starred some of the biggest names in Japanese cinema such as Sairi Ito and Suga Kenta.

In 2019, Third Window Films produced Tezuka's Barbara, an adaptation of the Osamu Tezuka manga directed by his son Makoto Tezuka. The film featured Christopher Doyle as the cinematographer and starred two of Japan's most famous names in ex-SMAP star Goro Inagaki and actress Fumi Nikaido.
