= Nightmare Detective 2 =

- Film poster
- Directed by: Shinya Tsukamoto
- Written by: Shinya Tsukamoto; Hisakatsu Kuroki
- Starring: Ryuhei Matsuda; Yui Miura; Hatsune Matsushima
- Cinematography: Shinya Tsukamoto; Takayuki Shida
- Edited by: Shinya Tsukamoto; Yuzi Kuroki
- Music by: Chu Ishikawa; Shin-Ichi Kawahara
- Production companies: Kaijyu Theater; Movie-Eye Entertainment
- Distributed by: Movie-Eye Entertainment
- Release date: December 20, 2008 (Japan)
- Running time: 102 minutes
- Country: Japan
- Language: Japanese

Nightmare Detective 2 (Japanese: 悪夢探偵2, Hepburn: Akumu Tantei 2) is a Japanese horror film, released in December 20, 2008, and directed by Shinya Tsukamoto. It is the sequel to the 2007 film Nightmare Detective, with Ryuhei Matsuda reprising his role as Kyoichi Kaganuma.

== Plot ==
Still haunted by his unwanted abilities, which allows him to enter other people's dreams, and memories of his mother dying when he was a child, Kyoichi Kagenuma (Ryuhei Matsuda) contemplates suicide while slowly drowns in his world of misery. Yukie Mashiro (Yui Miura), having heard rumours about Kagenuma's extraordinary abilities, visits his home to beg for his help.

She tells him she suffers from nightly nightmares that are getting scarier. The murderous ghost in the dreams has already killed two of her friends and she's afraid she's the next to die. She believes that only Kagenuma could save her. Kagenuma ignores her pleas for help. Yukie, refusing to give up, returns every day to change his mind.

Kagenuma finally decides to take on Yukie's case to understand the circumstances of his mother's death. It, however, demands from Kagenuma more than he expected to give while it leads him into the darkest corners of dreamscape.

== Cast ==
- Ryuhei Matsuda as Kyoichi Kagenuma
- Yui Miura as Yukie Mashiro
- Wako Andô as Mutsumi
- Miwako Ichikawa as Itsuko Kagenuma
- Hanae Kan as Yuko Kikugawa
- Toshiyuki Kitami as Tetsuji Kikugawa
- Hatsune Matsushima as Akiko
- Ken Mitsuishi as Takio Kagenuma
- Shungiku Uchida as Kiriko

== Production ==
The character of Lt. Keiko Kirishima was meant to return in the sequel, but Hitomi declined to reprise her role.

== Reception ==
The film received generally positive reviews.

Twitchfilm reviewer Ard Fijn gave it a positive review, writing, "Shinya Tsukamoto has made a very impressive film with some strong statements about loss and grief, and has wrapped this in a fantasy horror mystery thriller. People expecting a regular entry from one of those four genres are in for either a rude awakening or a pleasant surprise. For me "Nightmare Detective 2" was a pleasant surprise, but many people I spoke with after the viewing were less enamored by the convoluted story."

Japancinema reviewed the film positively, stating, "Nightmare Detective 2 can actually be viewed as a stand alone film, however, watching the original first is always advisable. One big hurdle for viewers to overcome is the fact that this film is jam-packed with ambiguity from start to finish but I urge you not to be driven to frustration. The first film had a visceral brutality to it, as this one on the other hand, can be described as a slow ride into silent darkness." The review suggested that a third film would be welcomed.

Rowthree.com gave the film 4 out of a possible 5 and also commented that he would embrace a third movie, writing, "I for one truly hope that Tsukamoto and Matsuda will return one final time and wrap the story up in a trilogy. I am sure we will be left with as many questions as answers when everything is done but with a character so compelling and Tsukamoto's unique vision into dreams I for one welcome the challenge of revisiting the Nightmare Detective again."
