= Shadow of Fire =

- Theatrical release poster
- Directed by: Shinya Tsukamoto
- Written by: Shinya Tsukamoto
- Produced by: Shinya Tsukamoto
- Starring: Shuri; Oga Tsukao; Hiroki Kono; Mirai Moriyama
- Cinematography: Shinya Tsukamoto
- Edited by: Shinya Tsukamoto
- Music by: Chu Ishikawa
- Production company: Kaijyu Theatre
- Distributed by: Shin Nippon Films
- Release date: November 23, 2023 (Japan)
- Running time: 95 minutes
- Country: Japan
- Language: Japanese

Shadow of Fire (Japanese: ほかげ, Hepburn: Hokage) is a 2023 Japanese war drama film written and directed by Shinya Tsukamoto.

The film premiered at the Horizons section of the 80th edition of the Venice Film Festival, winning the NETPAC Award. It was awarded the Award for Excellence Film at the 78th Mainichi Film Awards.

== Synopsis ==
In the aftermath of the Pacific War, a woman lives alone in a tavern that is one of the only buildings left standing after her city was fire bombed. In order to survive, she is referred to by a pimp, who sends men to the tavern who physically take advantage of her.

== Cast ==
- Shuri
- Oga Tsukao
- Hiroki Kono
- Mirai Moriyama
- Gō Rijū
- Tatsushi Ōmori
- Kengo Kakiuchi

== Reception ==
On the review aggregator website Rotten Tomatoes, 89% of 9 critics' reviews are positive, with an average rating of 7.00/10.
