= A Snake of June =

2002 film by Shinya Tsukamoto

- Theatrical release poster
- Directed by: Shinya Tsukamoto
- Written by: Shinya Tsukamoto
- Produced by: Shinya Tsukamoto; Shin-Ichi Kawahara
- Cinematography: Shinya Tsukamoto
- Edited by: Shinya Tsukamoto; Zenya Ohara
- Music by: Chu Ishikawa
- Production company: Kaijyu Theater
- Distributed by: There's Enterprise
- Release dates: September 1, 2002 (Venice); May 24, 2003 (Japan)
- Running time: 77 minutes
- Country: Japan
- Language: Japanese

A Snake of June (Japanese: 六月の蛇, Hepburn: Rokugatsu no hebi) is a 2002 Japanese erotic thriller film written and directed by Shinya Tsukamoto. His seventh film, it is notable for its monochrome blue cinematography tinted in post production. It won the Kinematrix Film Award and the San Marco Special Jury Award at the 59th Venice International Film Festival.

== Plot ==
Rinko Tatsumi, a young counselor at a crisis hotline, is in a caring but sexless marriage with her older husband Shigehiko, a hygiene-obsessed workaholic. One day, an envelope arrives at Rinko's office. She opens it and is disturbed to find that it contains candid photographs of herself at home, some of which show her masturbating and looking at sex toys.

Rinko is contacted by the sender, Michiro Iguchi, a caller to the hotline whom Rinko helped recover from suicidal impulses. Iguchi tells her that he will return the photo negatives if she complies with his instructions. Rinko reluctantly does so, first walking in public wearing a miniskirt without underwear, then buying and using a vibrator, enacting things Iguchi photographed her doing in secret at home. Having brought Rinko to a sexual awakening, Iguchi keeps his promise, but withholds one final negative, promising to return it after Rinko complies with his demand to visit her doctor. There, she learns that a mark Iguchi noticed on her body is a sign that she has breast cancer.

Rinko tells Shigehiko about the cancer and a planned mastectomy of her breast, but he reacts with shock. After finding one of the discarded photos, Shigehiko begins tailing Rinko. He witnesses her go out in the skimpy clothing, masturbate publicly in an alleyway, and finally remove all her clothing and reach orgasm in the rain as Iguchi photographs her from the window of a car. Shigehiko watches covertly and pleasures himself.

Iguchi lures Shigehiko to a warehouse and attacks him, choking him with a long mechanical appendage strapped to his waist as he berates him. Iguchi, who has terminal cancer himself, is incensed that Rinko repressed her sexual desires and cancelled her scheduled mastectomy due to Shigehiko's resistance, and will now die because of it. After photographing the brutalized Shigehiko and leading Rinko to his location, Iguchi dies himself from the advancement of his cancer.

Rinko comes to the wounded Shigehiko's rescue and they return home, where they have passionate sex as they embrace.

== Cast ==
- Asuka Kurosawa as Rinko Tatsumi
- Yuji Kohtari (credited as Yuji Koutari) as Shigehiko
- Shinya Tsukamoto as Iguchi
- Tomorowo Taguchi
- Mansaku Fuwa
- Susumu Terajima
- Shūji Ōtsuki
- Tomoko Matsumoto
- Masato Tsujioka
