= Nightmare Detective =

- Directed by: Shinya Tsukamoto
- Written by: Shinya Tsukamoto
- Produced by: Takuji Ushiyama; Shinya Tsukamoto
- Starring: Ryuhei Matsuda; Ren Osugi; Hitomi; Masanobu Andō
- Cinematography: Shinya Tsukamoto
- Edited by: Shinya Tsukamoto
- Music by: Chu Ishikawa
- Production companies: Kaijyu Theater; Movie-Eye Entertainment
- Distributed by: Movie-Eye Entertainment
- Release dates: October 14, 2006 (Rome Film Fest); January 13, 2007 (Japan)
- Running time: 105 minutes
- Country: Japan
- Language: Japanese

Nightmare Detective (悪夢探偵, Akumu Tantei) is a 2006 Japanese horror film directed by Shinya Tsukamoto and released by Movie-Eye Entertainment Inc, starring Ryuhei Matsuda and Hitomi. Masanobu Andō and Ren Osugi play supporting roles, and Tsukamoto himself plays the unnamed villain. The film is shot entirely within Adachi, Tokyo.

Nightmare Detective 2 was released in 2008. Matsuda returns in the lead role of Kagenuma. Hitomi declined to reprise her role.

== Plot ==
The film opens with a middle-aged man drinking beer, when a young man Kyoichi Kagenuma (Ryuhei Matsuda) appears from under the floor, and it is revealed that the older man, Mitake, is a former teacher of Kagenuma's father. Kagenuma is being haunted by the soul of a daughter whom his wife had aborted without his knowledge. Mitake refuses to help him.

Kagenuma wakes up in hospital next to the body of Mitake, and surrounded by Mitake's children. Kagenuma had been in Mitake's dream, to find out who should inherit his property, but cannot answer. As he leaves, Kagenuma telepathically hears the selfish thoughts of Mitake's children, and realises that a messy legal battle is about to commence.

Meanwhile, Lieutenant Keiko Kirishima (Hitomi) recently switched from the National Police Academy to a district police station. Her new colleagues, Detective Ishida (Ren Osugi) and Detective Wakamiya (Masanobu Andō) do not understand her, and are somewhat envious of her qualifications. Her own prickly personality does not help matters; she interprets their casualness at crime scenes as a lack of professionalism. She is unable to stomach the gruesome scene at her first case, so Ishida mocks her.

Her first case is a young woman who has been found dead in her apartment, horribly slashed with a blade placed in her own hand. The fact that the apartment was locked from the inside convinces Ishida and Wakamiya that the case is a suicide; Kirishima is not so sure, as no note was left and a neighbour heard the victim crying out for help. Later, Kirishima's team is confronted by a similar case. A wife saw her husband slash himself to death while asleep in their bed.

Kirishima discovers a link between the two unrelated victims; both had last dialled the same number, a sequence not registered anywhere in the country. The recording of both conversations reveals a young woman saying "help me" over and over again. It is suspected that some form of hypnotic suggestion was used. Because of the strange nature of the cases, the chief of the division separates the investigators into two groups. One, led by Detective Ishida, is to carry out 'the standard procedure', while the other, led by both Lieutenant Kirishima and Detective Wakamiya, is to investigate supernatural causes for the murders. This frustrates the rationalistic Kirishima. She and Wakamiya are directed to Kagenuma, who is described as a person with the power to enter dreams.

However, Kagenuma is very unwilling to help, because he does not like to use his power. In fact, he had just tried to kill himself, but kids from the neighborhood saved him. The police leave him, and Kirishima suggests calling the mysterious number. In the end Wakamiya makes contact, but Kirishima seems to know something is wrong. Soon after Wakamiya is attacked while asleep. Kirishima again asks the Nightmare detective to intervene. Wakamiya has fallen asleep on the couch in the police station. Kagenuma, now with confidence, finally enters Wakamiya's dream and confronts O. Wakamiya is killed and Kagenuma ends up injured. He want to escape, but Kirishima forces his hand by calling O herself. So he must enter her dream, or let her die. He reluctantly decides to try to save her. Meanwhile, the other squad is getting close to O in the real world.

As Kirishima is close to sleep, she speaks with O, wanting to know how he's able to go into minds. O reveals that he originally wanted to die alongside the first victim, but instead somehow crawled into her mind, feeling a rush and hunger to kill her. Wanting to feel the rush again, he continued to kill other people.

In the dream, Kirishima is chased around a derelict school, ultimately being confronted by her inner self, who berates her for her weakness. Eventually, O chases her into an old furnace, trapping her before being attacked by Kagenuma. Kagenuma unlocks a repressed memory of O, revealing that, as a child, his teacher locked him in the same furnace Kirishima is in, alongside his sister who is killed when trying to escape. (The little girl is revealed to be the one who originally said the repeated "help me.")

As Kagenuma battles O in the dream world, O speaks to him, saying that through his understanding, the modern world takes life for granted, and only through fear, people are truly alive, stating that he would like to show the world what fear is again with Kagenuma's help. As Kagenuma refuses, he begins to slice at him, as Kirishima pleads that she wants to live, and for Kagenuma to live with her, as memories of their childhoods begin to flash before them, along with visuals of constellations. O then stops his assault on Kagenuma, seeing Kirishima peering in at them through an opening in his mind. As he tries to go after her, he ends up diving through a glass window and crashing onto a car below, ending up bloodied and disfigured, whilst in the real world, he succumbs to his stab wound at a hospital.

After Kirishima closes the case, she visits Kagenuma at a mental hospital during a conjugal visit, where he is let out for a little while under her watch. As they bond, Kirishima asks Kagenuma if he will stop going into people's dreams, to which he replies that while he hopes to, he doesn't know if he can. He then asks her if she'll continue to be a detective, to which she says she has to, but doesn't know if she can. Kagenuma then affirms that he doesn't know if he'll continue, because all he sees are things he doesn't like, to which Kirishima asks if that's truly what he believes, which makes him think, as they look on at their surroundings together.

== Cast ==
- Ryuhei Matsuda as Kyoichi Kagenuma
- Hitomi as Keiko Kirishima
- Masanobu Andō as Detective Wakamiya
- Ren Osugi as Detective Sekiya
- Yoshio Harada as Keizo Oishi
- Shinya Tsukamoto as "O"
