= Haze (2005 film) =

- Theatrical release poster
- Directed by: Shinya Tsukamoto
- Written by: Shinya Tsukamoto
- Starring: Shinya Tsukamoto
- Cinematography: Shinya Tsukamoto
- Edited by: Shinya Tsukamoto
- Music by: Chu Ishikawa
- Production company: Kaijyu Theatre
- Distributed by: Gold View Company Ltd.
- Release dates: October 1, 2005 (US); March 4, 2006 (Japan)
- Running time: 49 minutes
- Country: Japan
- Language: Japanese

Haze (Japanese: ＨＡＺＥ ヘイズ) is a 2005 Japanese mystery horror film written and directed by Shinya Tsukamoto who also stars in the movie. After appearances at several international festivals in 2005, the film debuted theatrically in Japan on March 4, 2006. Two versions of the film exist: the original release, a short 25-minute version; and what Director Tsukamoto titled the "Long Version", which runs 49 minutes.

== Plot ==
A man wakes up in a small concrete space, bleeding from the abdomen. He can barely move and has no recollection of why or how he came to be there. Moving through tortuous spaces, he eventually meets a woman and they try to piece together their past lives.

The woman decides to escape, entering a ditch full of water and severed bodies, and the man follows. Behind them is a menacing growl. Eventually, they have to dive underwater to continue. Discouraged, the man begs her to go back but she refuses. After discussing why they were brought there, the two share a tender moment, then swim underwater to advance.

The man floats in a vision and reaches an opening where light breaks through a closed hatch. Climbing, he sees the interior of a house and pushes through in anger. His eyes open: he is lying on the floor, his abdomen bloodied. Across the floor, the woman's hand is visible. Blood pools, and she weeps lamentably. Determined to save her, he reaches for the phone and dials the emergency number.

The man, now aged, gets up from a sofa. On a shelf is a photograph of the woman, aged and laughing. He walks out onto the roof, basking in the sun and touching drying clothes.

The man and woman, both young, are sitting and watching fireworks in the distance. He holds her hand. They are faintly smiling, the woman's eyes etched with tears.

== Cast ==
- Shinya Tsukamoto
- Kaori Fujii (藤井かほり)
- Takahiro Murase (村瀬貴洋)
- Takahiro Kandaka (神高貴宏)
- Masato Tsujioka
- Mao Saito (さいとう真央)

== Reception ==
Keith Uhlich from Slant Magazine awarded the film three and a half out of four stars, writing, "Many directors would no doubt take a god’s-eye perspective of Haze's hero, but Tsukamoto favors an intimate camera style that offsets the genre film sturm und drang and grounds his movie in a terrifyingly mortal perspective." Niina Doherty from HorrorNews.net gave the film a positive review, praising the film's claustrophobic atmosphere, sound design, and cinematography.
