= Bullet Men =

South Korean sculptures

- 총알맨들 (Korean)
- Artist: Kim Ji-hyun
- Year: 2008
- Dimensions: 230 cm × 65 cm × 60 cm (91 in × 26 in × 24 in)
- Location: Daegwallyeong-myeon, Pyeongchang, South Korea; 37°39′26″N 128°40′31″E
- Owner: Gangwon Art & Culture Foundation

Bullet Men (Korean: 총알맨들; RR: Chongal Maendeul; MR: Ch'ongal Maendŭl) is a set of sculptures that were crafted by Korean artist Kim Ji-hyun in 2008. The sculptures were installed at the Alpensia Convention Center, after it was purchased by the Gangwon Art & Culture Foundation at the Pyeongchang Biennale in 2013, and later received international attention during the 2018 Winter Olympics for being within proximity of the event's Main Press Centre.

== Design ==
The sculptures appear to be nude buff men with phallic, bullet-shaped helmets. According to Kim, the Bullet Men are meant to represent the hidden human desires for a beautiful body, wealth, and fame in a patriarchal society. Helmets were used to represent the fragility of human nature, especially the fragility of masculinity in a society with multiple genders, shielding the self-conscious men from external hostility and placing them in a relaxed state that incidentally amplifies their anxiety, rendering them unable to decide whether they should remove the helmet or not.

== Reception ==
When a Tokyo Sports reporter asked volunteers about the sculptures during the 2018 Winter Olympics, they replied, "I don't know" (모르겠어요; Moreugesseoyo; Morŭgessŏyo). The sculptures would become a hot topic amongst Japanese users, interpreting the reply as its name and rendering it as Morugessoyo (Japanese: モルゲッソヨ), on Twitter and Instagram. In response, Kim appreciated the variety of reactions to the sculptures, while giving strong comments to value humanity over ideologies.
