= Kotoko (film) =

- Film poster
- Directed by: Shinya Tsukamoto
- Screenplay by: Shinya Tsukamoto
- Story by: Cocco
- Produced by: Shinya Tsukamoto
- Starring: Cocco; Shinya Tsukamoto
- Cinematography: Satoshi Hayashi; Shinya Tsukamoto
- Edited by: Shinya Tsukamoto
- Music by: Cocco
- Production companies: Kaijyu Theatre; Makotoya
- Distributed by: Makotoya
- Release date: September 8, 2011 (Venice)
- Running time: 91 minutes
- Country: Japan
- Language: Japanese

Kotoko is a 2011 Japanese psychological horror drama film written and directed by Shinya Tsukamoto. The film is based on an original story by J-pop artist Cocco, who stars in the film alongside Tsukamoto.

== Plot ==
A single mother, Kotoko struggles to care for her infant son, Daijiro, while suffering from hallucinations that cause her to see violent doubles of people she encounters. She regularly practices self-harm, fascinated by her body's will to survive, and discovers that her hallucinations cease only when she is singing.

After having a breakdown while trying to cook a meal, Daijiro is taken away from Kotoko under suspicion that she is abusing him and is sent to be raised by Kotoko's sister and her family. During a bus ride to visit them, Kotoko's singing catches the attention of a man. While standing on the roof of her building, Kotoko is approached by the same man. Following a hallucination involving him, he reassures her that he means her no harm and reveals that he is Tanaka Seitaro, an award-winning novelist.

Tanaka asks Kotoko if she would be willing to date him, but she responds by stabbing his hand with a fork. She continues to rebuff his advances until one night, when she sees him accepting an award on television. After reading his new book, she agrees to go on a date with him. One night, Tanaka rushes to Kotoko's apartment and finds her slitting her wrists. After helping her, he proposes marriage, but she refuses and forces him out of the apartment.

Upon returning, Tanaka finds Kotoko self-harming again. She flees the apartment and tells Tanaka that she is a terrible person. He reassures her that whatever she may have done in the past does not matter and that she is a good person now. He then suggests that they visit Daijiro together, which they do. During the visit, Kotoko tells her sister that she intends to be happy from then on.

Tanaka eventually moves in with Kotoko, and the two begin a volatile relationship. She performs a song for him, bringing them both to tears. Kotoko returns home from work to find a letter from her sister informing her that Daijiro is being returned to her, as she is considered to have been rehabilitated. She rushes to tell Tanaka, but finds no trace of him in the apartment.

She welcomes Daijiro upon his return, but Kotoko becomes despondent again and hallucinates a duplicate of him. Her inability to distinguish between the two results in Daijiro stabbing himself in the eye with a pencil.

While watching a news report, Kotoko hallucinates a gunman entering her apartment and shooting Daijiro in the head. Fearing that other strangers may hurt her son, Kotoko attempts to strangle him in his sleep so that he will not die in terror. However, she hallucinates herself inside a cardboard replica of the room, with sculptures and two dolls in place of Daijiro.

Now in a mental institution, Kotoko asks to go outside to smoke and dances in the rain. She is visited by Daijiro, who is still alive and now a teenager. He tells her about his life and makes her a paper swan before leaving.

== Cast ==
- Cocco as Kotoko
- Shinya Tsukamoto as Tanaka Seitaro

== Release ==
Kotoko premiered at the 68th Venice International Film Festival where it won the Best Film award in the festival's Orizzonti section, the first Japanese film to do so.

The film was picked up for distribution in the UK by Third Window Films and was released on DVD and Blu-ray Disc on October 8, 2012.

The film was re-released alongside Tsukamoto’s other films on Blu-ray by Arrow Video as part of the Solid Metal Nightmares Boxset.
