= Tetsuo: The Iron Man =

1989 film by Shinya Tsukamoto

- Theatrical release poster

Japanese name
- Kanji: 鉄男
Transcriptions
- Revised Hepburn: Tetsuo
- Directed by: Shinya Tsukamoto
- Written by: Shinya Tsukamoto
- Produced by: Shinya Tsukamoto
- Starring: Tomorowo Taguchi; Kei Fujiwara; Shinya Tsukamoto
- Cinematography: Shinya Tsukamoto; Kei Fujiwara
- Edited by: Shinya Tsukamoto
- Music by: Chu Ishikawa
- Production company: Kaijyu Theatre
- Distributed by: Kaijyu Theatre
- Release date: 1 July 1989
- Running time: 67 minutes
- Country: Japan
- Language: Japanese
- Budget: $100,000–$130,000

Tetsuo: The Iron Man (Japanese: 鉄男, Hepburn: Tetsuo; lit. 'Iron Man') is a 1989 Japanese body horror film directed, written, produced, and edited by Shinya Tsukamoto. The film centers on an unnamed salaryman who wakes up to find pieces of metal sprouting from his body and becomes haunted by visions of metal-oriented sexual fantasies, before developing a connection with a victim from a hit-and-run accident, who is undergoing a similar transformation.

The film was the first feature-length film by Tsukamoto after he spent his youth creating film shorts and entering Japanese experimental theatre. Through his theatre work, he met like-minded people to perform in plays and later short films such as Kei Fujiwara and Tomorowo Taguchi. Filming proved to be difficult, as much of the cast and crew abandoned the production and only Taguchi and Tsukamoto arrived on set to finish the film. After winning the Grand Prize at the Fantafestival in Italy, the film grew in popularity in Japan, becoming a top seller on home video for non-mainstream cinema.

Outside Japan, critics compared the film to the work of directors Sam Raimi, David Cronenberg, and David Lynch, finding the film to be original and difficult to parse. Tsukamoto directed a sequel titled Tetsuo II: Body Hammer in 1992 and a third film Tetsuo: The Bullet Man in 2009. In 2012, Michael Brooke of Sight & Sound declared the film "remains one of the most pulverisingly effective sci-fi horror films of the past quarter of a century". Japanese film magazine Kinema Junpo included it on their list of top 200 Japanese films in 2009.

== Plot ==
After a young man referred to in the credits as the "Metal Fetishist" inserts scrap metal into a self-inflicted wound on his thigh, he becomes a victim in a hit-and-run accident. The driver, a typical salaryman, later finds a metallic thorn protruding from his cheek while shaving. On his way out of a subway station, he is attacked and chased by a woman who sprouts a gauntlet of metallic tentacles and speaks with the Metal Fetishist's voice, and flees with the aid of rocket thrusters that inexplicably fire from his feet. The salaryman later finds metallic scabs on his own skin.

At home the salaryman sleeps next to his girlfriend and has a dream in which he is sodomized by organic metal machinery. Waking up, he either imagines or discovers that the metal transformation is taking over more and more of his body. When he attempts to have sex with his girlfriend, his penis becomes a metallic drill, which leads him to lock himself away from his girlfriend. She approaches insisting she is not afraid but he attacks her and, when he tries to sexually assault her with his transformed penis, she stabs him in the neck causing him to pass out. The Salaryman regains consciousness to find his girlfriend has fatally impaled herself on the drill.

Meanwhile the Metal Fetishist's memories are displayed to the audience in the form of looping videos; he recalls the moment of the accident and a doctor who tells him of metal embedded in his brain. The Fetishist telekinetically reaches out to the Salaryman, puppeting his girlfriend's corpse and transforming the contents of his apartment into metal - initially to menace him, but then to promise a "new world of metal". The Salaryman flees in a panic when the Fetishist arrives at his residence, while the Fetishist has a flashback to a tramp beating him with a metal bar.

The Salaryman and the Fetishist meet again in a run-down factory, both finding their entire bodies more metal than flesh. The Fetishist's tone changes from anger to love as he seems to envy the Salaryman's stainless steel body - his own transformation being overcome with rust. The two fight but then merge into a giant form resembling a motorised metal phallus, where the Salaryman feels powerful and the Fetishist feels relaxed. They take to the streets of the city convinced they can mutate the entire world into metal, the Salaryman out of vengeance and the Fetishist for pleasure.

== Cast ==
- Tomorowo Taguchi as the Salaryman
- Kei Fujiwara as the Salaryman's girlfriend
- Nobu Kanaoka as the woman in glasses
- Shinya Tsukamoto as the Metal Fetishist
- Naomasa Musaka as the doctor
- Renji Ishibashi as the tramp

Cast adapted from the Sight & Sound review.

== Production ==
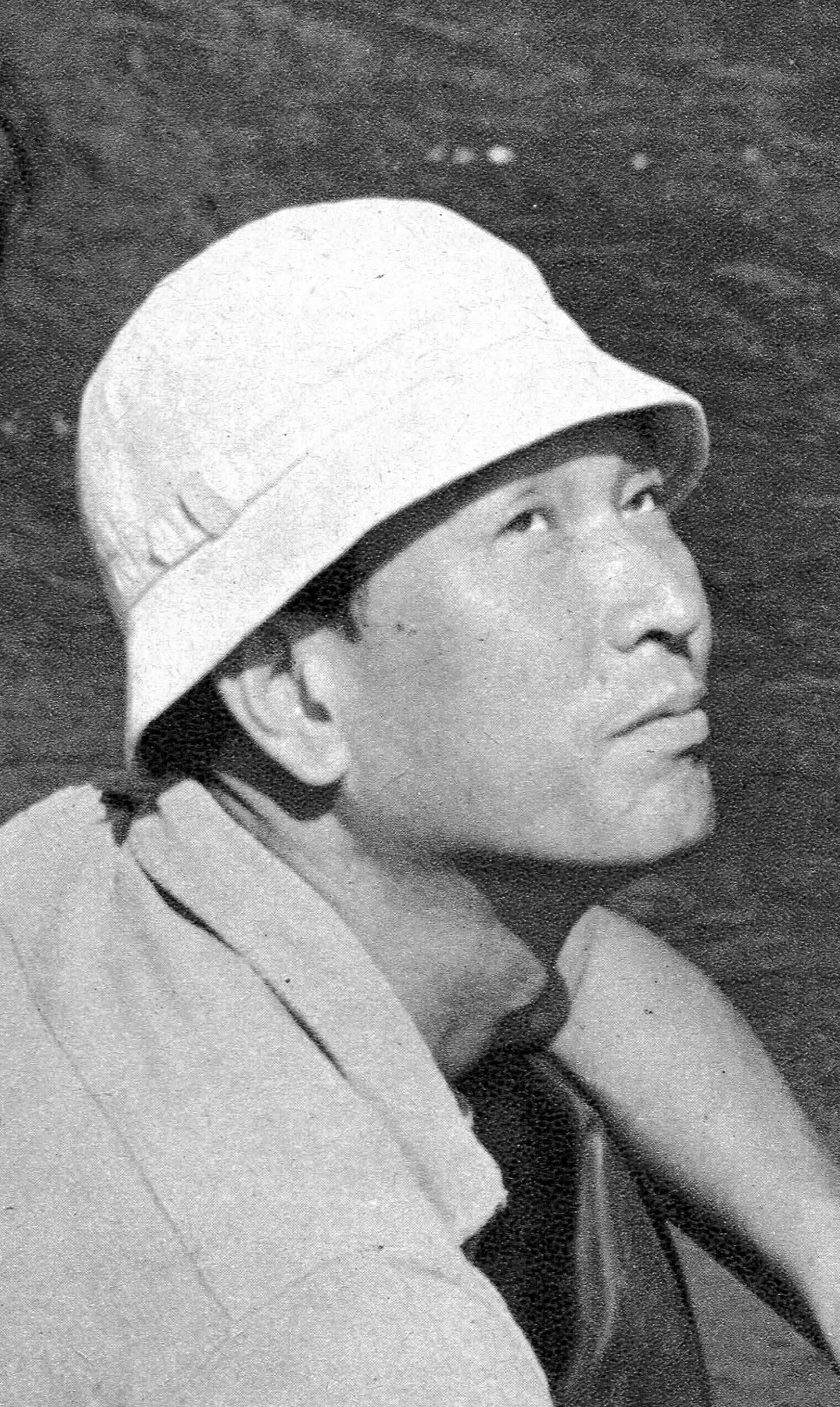
Akira Kurosawa

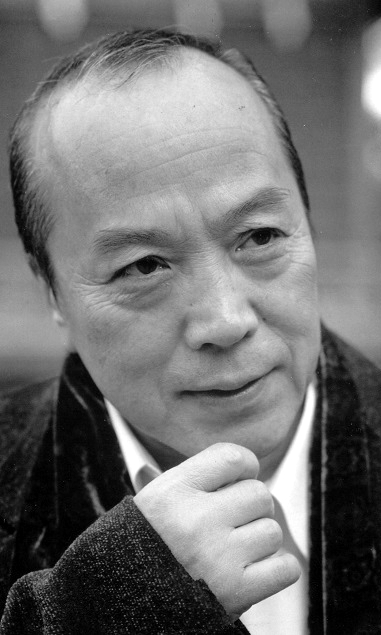
Jūrō Kara

Early influences for Shinya Tsukamoto on Tetsuo: The Iron Man included director Akira Kurosawa and stage director Jūrō Kara.

=== Background and pre-production ===
As a child, Tsukamoto read Shōnen Tanteidan and other children's books by Edogawa Ranpo in late grade school and early high school, finding himself interested in what he described as the "dark edges" of the books. He recalled, "I had similar feelings from reading his books as leafing through SM magazines I read when I was in high school." Tsukamoto was also a fan of kaiju series as a child, seeing the Gamera and Godzilla films and the television series Ultra Q. Tsukamoto spoke specifically being interested in Ultra Q, noting the mismatched elements of the show gave it a surreal flavor, which he felt led him to become interested in surrealism in high school. One day while Tsukamoto was still in school, his father brought home an 8mm camera, which he soon inherited. He began making short and feature-length amateur films with his brother by 1974, which were initially monster movies. He began expanding his film input in high school, with the first non-monster movie he saw being Bitterness of Youth by Tatsumi Kumashiro, American films and the works of Akira Kurosawa. Tsukamoto stated that from Kurosawa he learned that one could work with light to manipulate the images on film, which Tsukamoto's biographer Tom Mes stated would anticipate his work in Tetsuo: The Iron Man. Tsukamoto has since expressed very mixed feelings on these early films, even only letting his wife see them in 2002. Tsukamoto became frustrated with film work towards the end of the 1970s and began focusing on stage work while entering university.

Tsukamoto had performed and directed plays in high school, finding that they were "quite conventional" and that he preferred to do more experimental theatre. Tsukamoto specifically spoke about the work of Jūrō Kara as an influence, whose work often dealt with themes such as matricide and incest. Tsukamoto appreciated working in plays as it led to immediate feedback from audiences, who started out as spectators, who would want to work with him. Among the early people who reached out to Tsukamoto was Nobu Kanaoka who had roles in Tsukamoto's 1980s short films and Tetsuo: The Iron Man. Working with enthusiastic supporters led to Tsukamoto being able to make films and plays without outside funding and outside influences from production companies. Following graduation in 1984, Tsukamoto entered into advertising agencies which he hoped would give him access to professional film equipment. It took 18 months before Tsukamoto was allowed to direct commercials. He recalled that in those eighteen months he was almost never at home, and that working as a corporate employee for long hours was a major influence on Tetsuo: The Iron Man. Tsukamoto was able to return to doing theatre work in 1985 where he created the Kaiju Shiata group. His plays retained the experimental style of his previous stage work, and connected him with Kei Fujiwara, who had been a member of Jūrō Kara's company. Fujiwara would appear in Tsukamoto's later shorts as well as Tetsuo: The Iron Man, even letting him film large portions of it at her home. By 1986, Tsukamoto quit his job at the Ide Production advertising company, with the intention of returning to filmmaking.

Tsukamoto's first work was The Phantom of Regular Size, a short film made with members of his Kaiju Shiata group, about a salaryman whose body eventually turns into scrap metal. The film was shot in less than a week. Among the cast was Tomorowo Taguchi, who had met Tsukamoto when he was performing in a theatre production that Tsukamoto had seen. They two collaborated on a play titled The Adventure of Denchu Kozo and later was cast in this short as a salaryman. Mes noted the short had themes and elements that would be expanded upon in Tetsuo: The Iron Man such as a woman with a metallic claw hand and the adverse effects of city life on people.

=== Filming ===
Tetsuo: The Iron Man was shot back to back with the short film The Adventure of Denchu Kozo. Among the major changes from his short film work, was changing from 8mm film to 16mm, which would make the film suitable for theatrical presentation. The film was initially going to be made as an additional short film, at about thirty minutes in length. The choice was made after seeing some Derek Jarman films which were shot in black and white and when blown up to 16mm and 35mm projections, Tsukamoto felt the excessive grain produced interesting imagery. The black and white also provided leverage with ratings certificates, since the blood would be hard to decipher. He then purchased a Canon Scoopic 16mm camera with 10 reels of black and white film stock and began production on the film in September 1987.

The film's narrative was built upon his previous short The Phantom of Regular Size, with actors Tomorowo Taguchi, Nobu Kanaoka, and Tsukamoto portraying similar roles to the short. Other actors included Naomasa Musaka and Renji Ishibashi who had worked in major film studios such as Nikkatsu and Toei in the 1970s. Tsukamoto initially sent him a fan letter, and then asked him to appear in the film. The costumes in the film were made from scrap metal and small parts of electronic appliances stuck onto the actor with double-sided adhesive tape. This led to issues with Taguchi, who had metal added to him until Tsukamoto felt it looked right, only to find that the outfit was so heavy that Taguchi could not get up from his make-up chair. Initial tests led to Taguchi being in great discomfort, saying that at the end of a shooting day, his skin felt like sandpaper. As filming progressed, Taguchi's make-up and suit were refined so he could easily take off and on the suit.

Like his 1980s short film work, a large portion of the film was shot in Fujiwara's apartment. Exteriors of the film were shot at Kawaguchi iron factory, north of Tokyo. On traveling between locations, the cast members could not take their make-up off, which Tsukamoto recalled led to, "people looking at us like we were crazy". Tsukamoto explained that the cast and crew, "thought this film would be a parody", and that since they only had time to do things in one take, they ended up performing in what he described as a "more exaggerated, over-acted style, which is easier". Arguments would often erupt on set between the cast and crew, as well as Fujiwara's neighbors. Fujiwara stated that the two had always argued, but it became more difficult as they began working on films. Taguchi said that nearly every day they would lose a crew member, and towards the end only actors were showing up, leading to the cast members filling in for various technical roles. When Tsukamoto had to appear on screen, he would set up his shot and then have Fujiwara operate the camera. Consequently, Fujiwara is credited in the film as an assistant director, costume designer, and the second director of photography.

After four months of shooting, Tsukamoto began developing what footage he had in the editing room, which he had access to for free from former co-workers at Ide. While editing, Tsukamoto realized he needed more material and went to film pick-up shots, which continued until the end of 1988. Tsukamoto ran out of money while filming, and thus made a trailer to show to potential film distributors to gain further funding. Through his connections at the PIA Film Festival and F2 distributing, Tsukamoto connected with Japan Home Video, who were able to invest money to get the film completed. Cinefantastique suggested the final budget of the film was approximately $100,000 while The Japan Times stated the budget was 13 million yen.

=== Post-production ===
Tsukamoto created a rough cut of the film in December 1988, which ran at 77 minutes in length. Tsukamoto found himself emotionally and physically exhausted during the editing process, especially on hearing loud banging noises from the sound effects in the film again and again. During the editing process, Tsukamoto's short film The Adventure of Denchu Kozo won the Grand Prize award at the PIA Film Festival in Japan. He stated getting the award felt like "walking out of the darkness into a bright light" and helped him get motivation to finish editing the film.

For the film's score, Tsukamoto desired music that sounded like recurring metallic percussion sounds. Through an acquaintance, Tsukamoto found a tape by a group called Zeitlich Vergelter led by the musician Chu Ishikawa. Ishikawa had never scored a film before, but felt excited to work with Tsukamoto after meeting with him and being intrigued by his personality. Ishikawa made long pieces of music for the film. Ishikawa was initially instructed to make music with only the sound of metal, which confused him, and then realized that he should follow his own instincts on the music instead of taking Tsukamoto's instructions literally.

Tsukamoto finished editing the film in January 1989, with a new running time of 67 minutes. The cuts included shortening the sex scene between Taguchi and Fujiwara's characters, and removing a scene in which the doctor is murdered by the Fetishist and Kanaoka's tap dancing in the early chase scene.

== Style ==
When asked about the film's meaning, Tsukamoto responded that he felt it was about "the process in which human beings become 'Iron'; that is, it's some kind of human condition," and that when he made the film, he was "preoccupied with chaos, so I was trying to integrate the horror with the science fiction that I had within me." Tsukamoto expanded on this in an interview with The Japan Times in 1992, stating an interest in the erotic elements of juxtaposing a soft body against hard iron.

Mes described the pivotal element that made the film popular outside Japan as cyberpunk. Cyberpunk had been derived from the 1983 short story by American writer Bruce Bethke. The term became known as a subgenre of science fiction in both literature and film that explored the relation of the human body in an ever-growing urban landscape dominated by technology. Tsukamoto has given contradictory responses to his familiarity with the genre. In a 1993 interview in Cinefantastique, Tsukamoto stated he was impressed by David Cronenberg's film Videodrome (1983) and became aware of the burgeoning cyberpunk movement, which led him to make Tetsuo: The Iron Man. In other interviews, Tsukamoto expressed he was unfamiliar with the term when making the film, and that he had intended the film to showcase the eroticism of comparing metal with human flesh. Tsukamoto felt that Ridley Scott's Blade Runner (1982) and Videodrome were "two parents of Tetsuo" while finding his work was different from cyberpunk, as he found the genre dealt with the period after the destruction of modern cities.

Mes expanded on the themes of the film, stating that Tsukamoto works from a Japanese context which involves the negative aspects of life in a metropolis like Tokyo. Tsukamoto saw city life, working office jobs, and spending hours commuting as "numbing the senses and robbing people of their humanity. In his films he wants to wake up his countrymen in the most extreme ways possible."

== Release ==
When Tetsuo: The Iron Man was complete, Tsukamoto premiered the film at Nakano Musashino Hall, by his own account "the smallest theatre in Tokyo" with a capacity of 80 people. The theatre was equipped with a projector that could handle 16mm film and had it set for late-night screenings in July. The film was distributed by Kaijyu Theatre in Japan on July 1, 1989.

While developing a poster to promote the film, Tsukamoto approached film critic Yoichi Komatsuzawa for a promotional quote for the film. Komatsuzawa proposed to submit the film to the Fantafestival in Rome, of which he was the Asian film correspondent. In June, the film won the Best Film award at the festival. Japanese film critic Ken Okubo spoke of the impact of the win, saying "It was a great surprise, not just for me but for everybody in Tokyo. […] Even before Tetsuo, older Japanese film directors would submit their films to foreign festivals, but there was no real excitement from the audience for those films."

Following the award won at Fantafestival, the film was screened in Tokyo for three months at late shows around 9pm - the Japanese equivalent of a midnight screening. According to Chikako Shimoaka of The Japan Times, Tetsuo: The Iron Man performed extremely well, with over 10,000 copies on home video by 1992. Mark Thompson commented on the film's reception in Japan by comparing Tsukamoto to Akira Kurosawa or the band Shonen Knife: "an artist without an appreciative domestic audience, somehow finds fans and praise abroad, and returns home a folk hero". The film broke box office records for non-mainstream cinema in Japan.

The film was distributed in the United States by Original Cinema in early 1992 and in England in September 1991. It was released on home video in 1993 by Fox Lorber in the United States. DVDs were later released by Image Entertainment and Tartan Video under their Asia Extreme label. Arrow Video released the Solid Metal Nightmares set, a collection of Shinya Tsukamoto's films on Blu-ray, including Tetsuo: The Iron Man, on May 26, 2020. Third Window Films distributes a blu-ray boxset of the film and its first sequel.

== Reception ==
From contemporary reviews, critics commented on the film's originality and what Tony Rayns in Sight & Sound referred to as a "gleefully extremist" style. Dan Persons writing in Cinefantastique echoed this, noting the film "catches a lost spirit of pure, kinetic filmmaking" while Richard Harrington of The Washington Post described the film as "67 of the most relentlessly intense minutes in recent film history" with "a nightmarish hyper-reality about it". Rayns and Kevin Thomas of Los Angeles Times compared the film to the works of Sam Raimi, David Lynch, David Cronenberg and Kenneth Anger, with Thomas adding that "Tsukamoto like any first-rate artist, is finally not like anybody else." and that the film "is not just another horrific exploitation picture".

Discussing the plot, which Savlov found to be "less a coherent plot than a series of disturbing images loosely struck together" found the film worked on several levels, suggesting it could both be viewed as an AIDS analogy and a metaphor for the Japanese encroachment on the world market. Rayns declared that the film only had "few token gestures towards storytelling". and that he only found traces of satirical elements within the aggressive imagery. Stephen Holden of The New York Times generally felt that the film would only have a limited appeal to fans of more bizarre genre films.

From retrospective reviews, Michael Brooke of Sight & Sound noted the film's low budget "works brilliantly: the stop-motion effects give the fusion of bared wires and exposed ganglia an unnervingly vivid physicality" and proclaimed that the film "remains one of the most pulverisingly effective sci-fi horror films of the past quarter of a century". In the book The Definitive Guide to Horror Movies, James Marriott found that the film became wearying on repeated watches, and only Tsukamoto's Tokyo Fist came close to reaching Tetsuo: The Iron Man's visceral impact. In 2009, the Japanese film magazine Kinema Junpo placed Tetsuo: The Iron Man at number 97 on their list of top 200 Japanese films.

On the review aggregator website Rotten Tomatoes, 84% of 19 critics' reviews are positive, with an average rating of 7.1/10.

== Legacy ==
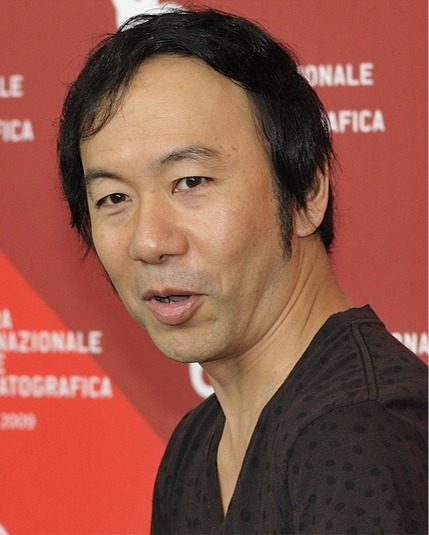
Director Shinya Tsukamoto in 2009, the year Tetsuo: The Bullet Man premiered.

Jay McRoy, author of Nightmare Japan: Contemporary Japanese Horror Cinema declared Tetsuo: The Iron Man as being "one of the most influential Japanese horror films ever produced" which along with Sogo Ishii's Burst City (1982) and Toshiharu Ikeda's Evil Dead Trap (1988) "spurred the emergence of an increasingly visceral and graphically violent wave of Japanese horror films."

Tsukamoto stated that the sequel, Tetsuo II: Body Hammer (1992) was made with more of a narrative to reach a wider audience. An attempt to make a third Tetsuo film with American collaborators, including director Quentin Tarantino, was discussed in the early 1990s but was never made. Tsukamoto stated he turned down the offers to make them in America as he was being told he would have to work with specific film stars and have short filming times to make the third film. Following Tsukamoto's work on Vital (2004), he spoke about returning for a third Tetsuo film which became Tetsuo: The Bullet Man (2009).

Taguchi was the only actor to continue working with Tsukamoto from Tetsuo: The Iron Man, with the actor stating he always kept some distance between himself and the director which has led them to continue to work together. Tensions between Fujiwara and Tsukamoto made this film their last project together. Following work on the film, Fujiwara returned to stage work with Jūrō Kara and created her own stage company called Organ Vital in 1991. She made her own feature film titled Organ (1996) based on one of her own plays that was also self-financed and shot on 16mm.

In 1993, Tsukamoto lamented the budget constraints of the film, initially wanting to have a scene with a long take and a long shot of the Salaryman's home becoming metal.

== See also ==
- Horror films of Asia
- Japanese horror
- Japanese science fiction
- List of Japanese films of 1989
