= Bullet Ballet =

- Theatrical release poster
- Directed by: Shinya Tsukamoto
- Screenplay by: Shinya Tsukamoto
- Produced by: Shinya Tsukamoto
- Starring: Shinya Tsukamoto; Hisashi Igawa; Sujin Kim; Kirina Mano
- Cinematography: Shinya Tsukamoto
- Edited by: Shinya Tsukamoto
- Music by: Chu Ishikawa
- Production company: Kaijyu Theater
- Distributed by: There's Enterprise
- Release dates: September 1998 (Venice Film Festival); March 11, 2000 (Japan)
- Running time: 87 minutes
- Country: Japan
- Language: Japanese

Bullet Ballet (Japanese: バレット・バレエ, Hepburn: Baretto barē) is a 1998 Japanese film directed by and starring Shinya Tsukamoto, and co-starring Hisashi Igawa, Sujin Kim, Kirina Mano, Takahiro Murase, Tatsuya Nakamura and Kyōka Suzuki. After his girlfriend commits suicide, a man (Shinya Tsukamoto) becomes embroiled in gang warfare attempting to obtain a gun in hopes to kill himself.

== Synopsis ==
A few days after the suicide of his companion, Goda crosses in an alley Chisato, a girl whom he had met and saved not long before, while she was trying to throw herself under a train. But the latter, screaming at rape, the advertiser finds himself face to face with Goto and his gang. Assaulted and robbed, he is summoned by them to bring back all his money the next time. At the end of his rope, Goda decides to buy a weapon. But during the transaction, he does not notice that the weapon in question is just a simple water pistol. He then resolves to mount his own revolver with pieces of metal. He has only one obsession: to kill.

== Cast ==
- Shinya Tsukamoto as Goda
- Kirina Mano as Chisato
- Tatsuya Nakamura as Idei
- Takahiro Murase as Goto
- Kyōka Suzuki as Kiriko
- Hisashi Igawa as Kudo

== Release ==
Bullet Ballet was first shown at the 55th Venice International Film Festival in September 1998. After the première, Tsukamoto decided to re-edit Bullet Ballet. After the Venice premiere, the Japanese company There's Enterprise offered to distribute the film in Japan. As Tsukamoto was busy with other festivals and developing his new film Gemini, he had to wait until Gemini was complete before finishing re-editing Bullet Ballet for the Japanese release. It was released in Japan on March 11, 2000.

The film was shown at the 1998 Toronto International Film Festival which showcased Japan as their country of focus in the festival's National Cinema program. The show was titled New Beat of Japan, which included Ping Pong Hot Springs, After Life, Beautiful Sunday, Happy Go Lucky and Cure.

== Reception ==
Variety gave the film a negative review, stating that "some may respond to the new thriller’s brooding B&W visuals and its spasmodic bursts of hammering violence, most followers of the director will see it merely as more of the same." Time Out gave the film a negative review, describing the film as "aggro art, intense, gut-felt - but also, like all Tsukamoto's work, numbingly over-stretched."

== See also ==
- List of Japanese films of 1998
