= Tetsuo: The Bullet Man =

2009 Japanese film

- Theatrical release poster
- Directed by: Shinya Tsukamoto
- Written by: Shinya Tsukamoto; Hisakatsu Kuroki
- Produced by: Shinichi Kawahara; Masayuki Taneshima
- Starring: Eric Bossick; Akiko Monō; Yuko Nakamura; Stephen Sarrazin; Shinya Tsukamoto
- Cinematography: Shinya Tsukamoto; Takayuki Shida; Satoshi Hayashi
- Edited by: Shinya Tsukamoto; Yuji Ambe
- Music by: Chu Ishikawa
- Production companies: Kaijyu Theater; Tetsuo The Bullet Man Group; Asmik Ace Entertainment
- Distributed by: Asmik Ace Entertainment
- Release dates: 5 September 2009 (Venice); 22 May 2010 (Japan)
- Running time: 79 minutes
- Country: Japan
- Language: English

Tetsuo: The Bullet Man is a 2009 English-language Japanese cyberpunk body horror thriller film directed by Shinya Tsukamoto. The film is a standalone sequel to Tetsuo: The Iron Man (1989) and Tetsuo II: Body Hammer (1992), and follows a man who transforms into a rageful metallic being after his son is killed in a car crash. It stars Eric Bossick, Akiko Monō, Yuko Nakamura, Stephen Sarrazin, and Tsukamoto. The film premiered at the Venice Film Festival on 5 September 2009, and released in Japan on 22 May 2010, by Asmik Ace Entertainment.

== Plot ==
Anthony Stoval, the son of an American father and a deceased Japanese mother, seems to be an unremarkable family man working as a corporate paper-pusher in Tokyo. Anthony's wife Yuriko suffers nightmares of their son Tom undergoing a violent transformation while his father, former biotechnology researcher turned general practitioner Dr Ride Stoval, obsesses over Anthony and Tom's health. When an unseen driver deliberately runs over Tom, the dying boy bleeds steaming black oil.

Anthony and Yuriko argue as the former's passivity in the wake of Tom's death clashes with the latter's desire for revenge on the killer. While flashing back to witnessing his son's death, parts of Anthony's body transform into metal. During one such episode he is shot dead by a hitman accompanied by a mysterious man named Yatsu, who taunts Anthony's corpse, revealing that he was the driver who murdered Tom. A revived and enraged Anthony transforms into a metallic form with a battery of guns in his torso but Yatsu narrowly escapes the hail of bullets.

Yatsu hacks Anthony's computer to display cryptic images of scientific documents, corporate meetings, Anthony's father, and the message 'check underground'. At Dr Ride's house Anthony finds a secret basement filled with files detailing a mysterious Tetsuo Project. This was a top secret joint Japanese-American project which sought to develop a race of biomechanical "human weapons". Anthony learns that his parents met while they both worked on the project and finds an inanimate body in the basement resembling Mitsue, his late mother.

Yuriko arrives but before she sees her husband in his transformed state, a team of heavily armed mercenaries hired to cover up the existence of the Tetsuo Project storm the house and take her hostage. Anthony defeats the mercenaries with bullets fired from his body but refrains from actually killing any of them. The injured team is extracted but then are murdered by Yatsu. Believing that he is possessed, Anthony attempts and fails to kill himself with a gun growing from his hand. Yuriko reveals that she is pregnant; her desire to keep the baby shocks Anthony, who fears that the child’s life would be ruined by inheriting his condition.

Anthony and Yuriko meet with the gravely wounded Dr Ride who explains before bleeding out: Mitsue was disgusted with the militaristic outcome of the Tetsuo Project, having joined it wanting to help crippled and sick people. When she learned of her terminal cancer, she insisted that her husband recreate her as an android using the Tetsuo Project’s technology - the origin of the body in the basement - so that he may still have a child with her in a way. That child grew up to be Anthony, meaning he and his late son were always part machine. Anger is the catalyst for Anthony's transformation; Yatsu murdered Tom and wounded Dr Ride specifically to provoke the emergence of Anthony's metal form.

Elsewhere Yatsu relents from shooting himself, wishing to die at Anthony's hand instead. Yatsu is by now revealed as this film's incarnation of the "Metal Fetishist" character from the previous Tetsuo films, retaining his love of mass destruction but in this version lacking metal powers of his own with which to enact that destruction. As such he seeks to push Anthony over the edge by provoking his own murder, leading the transformed Anthony to lose control and destroy the world in his stead.

As his final act of provocation Yatsu kidnaps Yuriko and puts a necklace containing a bomb on her, threatening her life if Anthony does not shoot him. During the ensuing chase, Anthony's rage grows stronger than ever and he transforms into a gigantic metal beast with a huge glowing cannon bore in its centre. Yatsu still provokes and threatens Anthony to shoot him. Receiving a vision of the city exploding in a giant ball of light if he does kill Yatsu, Anthony denies this wish and instead consumes Yatsu whole into his metal body, then returns to his human form.

Five years later, Anthony and Yuriko have returned to a normal, contented life with a new child. Anthony is haunted by echoes of Yatsu's final words: "You don't want me inside you. You don't know what I'll do". However, when a group of young thugs attempt to intimidate Anthony while walking down the street, rather than allow his anger to overtake him, he walks calmly and confidently past them.

== Cast ==
- Eric Bossick as Anthony
- Akiko Monō as Yuriko
- Yuko Nakamura as Mitsue
- Stephen Sarrazin as Dr Ride
- Shinya Tsukamoto as Yatsu
- Tiger Charlie Gerhardt as Tom

== Production ==
Following the release of the Japanese film Tetsuo II: Body Hammer (1992), which saw international attention, director Shinya Tsukamoto was approached by an American producer to do a third Tetsuo film set in the United States, but the initial project fell apart due to issues with budget, communication, and creative differences with producers. Quentin Tarantino was initially attached as producer, but Tsukamoto's "process was too slow", so Tarantino dropped from the project.

Tsukamoto also served as a cast member, writer with Hisakatsu Kuroki, editor with Yuji Ambe, and director of photography alongside cinematographers Takayuki Shida and Satoshi Hayashi. Shinichi Kawahara and Masayuki Taneshima served as producers. The film is a presentation of Tetsuo The Bullet Man Group and produced by Kaijyu Theater and Asmik Ace Entertainment.

=== Music ===
Frequent Tsukamoto collaborator Chu Ishikawa returned once again to compose the film's score and the closing credits feature an original instrumental theme song by Trent Reznor whose contribution fulfilled Tsukamoto's long-held ambition to work with Nine Inch Nails. (Tsukamoto had previously collaborated with Reznor on a Tetsuo-esque commercial for MTV Japan.)

== Release ==
Tetsuo: The Bullet Man premiered on 5 September 2009 as part of the Venice International Film Festival, although Tsukamoto was unsatisfied with the cut and later re-edited the film. The new cut premiered in the United States on 25 April 2010 as part of the Tribeca Film Festival. In July 2010, IFC Midnight purchased the North American distribution rights and Middle Eastern digital rights from sales agent Coproduction Office.

Collectible figure and toy manufacturer Kotobukiya released the film's official tie-in display figure, the Bullet Man Real Figure, at the 2010 San Diego Comic-Con.

=== Critical reception ===
The film received "largely negative reviews and reactions" following its premiere at Venice. Leslie Felperin of Variety praised the film's "retro" special effects, frantic editing, and loud sound and music, but criticized the familiar plot. Ray Bennett of The Hollywood Reporter took issue with the dialogue and acting, but similarly favored the sound and editing.

Film School Rejects' Adam Charles was displeased with the "harsh" visuals and sounds, and criticized the use of English dialogue "when eighty percent of the cast doesn’t appear to speak it significantly well, nor a director that can tell that they can’t." Tom Mes of Midnight Eye called the film "a true Tetsuo film as well as a true Tsukamoto film", and defended the use of English as a stylistic choice, but found flaws in the film's execution of the transformation and the lack of the overt eroticism found in the preceding entries.
