= Tokyo Fist =

1995 Japanese boxing film

- Tokyo Fist film poster
- Directed by: Shinya Tsukamoto
- Screenplay by: Shinya Tsukamoto
- Story by: Hisashi Saito; Shinya Tsukamoto
- Produced by: Shinya Tsukamoto
- Starring: Kahori Fujii; Shinya Tsukamoto; Kōji Tsukamoto
- Cinematography: Shinya Tsukamoto
- Edited by: Shinya Tsukamoto
- Music by: Chu Ishikawa
- Production company: Kaijyu Theater
- Distributed by: Kaijyu Theater; There's Enterprise
- Release dates: September 1995 (Turin Film Festival); October 21, 1995 (Japan)
- Running time: 87 minutes
- Country: Japan
- Language: Japanese

Tokyo Fist (Japanese: 東京フィスト, Hepburn: ＴＯＫＹＯ ＦＩＳＴ) is a 1995 Japanese film. It was directed by Shinya Tsukamoto, who also stars in the film along with his brother Kōji Tsukamoto and Kahori Fujii. The film had its premiere in September 1995 at the Turin Film Festival in Italy.

== Plot ==
Tsuda Yoshiharu, a door-to-door insurance salesman, takes up boxing after a chance meeting with a former high school friend, Kojima Yakuji. Tsuda is shown to be under immense stress due to having to support both himself and his fiancée, Hizuru, who quit her job after they became engaged. One day, Kojima turns up at Tsuda's apartment claiming he was invited, and Hizuru lets him in. While ostensibly waiting for Tsuda, Kojima comes on to Hizuru, who rejects him. Still, Tsuda finds out and becomes enraged. He confronts Kojima only to be beaten badly and humiliated in front of Hizuru.

Intrigued by the animalistic Kojima, Hizuru breaks up with Tsuda and moves in with his rival. She also starts to pierce herself and get tattoos. Hizuru also wants to take up boxing but is denied that life by the surprisingly cowardly Kojima, who says she is a scary freak of a woman. Kojima is offered a fight against an incredibly deadly boxer and is shown to be wary of accepting.

Kojima explains to Hizuru how he got into boxing. When he and Tsuda were in high school, a mutual friend was killed by salarymen. Tsuda and Kojima both vowed to learn boxing and take revenge when the culprits were released from prison. However, Tsuda abandoned this plan and suppressed the memories of the event, leaving only Kojima continuing down this path. To Kojima, Tsuda has become "a nobody" reminiscent of the salarymen. Hizuru warns Kojima that, by provoking Tsuda, he is inadvertently creating a killing machine. Kojima brushes off Hizuru's offer to fight her, to which she berates Kojima and states that everyone considers him a coward. In a rage, Kojima accepts the dangerous fight he had been offered earlier.

Tsuda's continued efforts to win Hizuru back, leading to a confrontation where they bond by beating each other's faces to a pulp. Hizuru returns home to engage in aggressive sex with Kojima. Tsuda and Kojima have a sparring match in their boxing club, in which Kojima nearly beats Tsuda to death. Afterwards, Kojima fights his real boxing match while Tsuda is in the hospital being treated for his bleeding eye. Meanwhile, Hizuru has gone overboard with the piercings and has implanted several metal bars into her flesh.

Kojima wins the match, but he has been pushed past his limit and his face is shown to be unrecognizable because of injuries. His face breaks apart while he is celebrating his victory, suggesting fatal wounds. Hizuru is shown in a field, where she attempts to rip out her various piercings, but ends up bleeding to death. Tsuda is last seen standing in front of an apartment building, the pupil of his eye now missing. The final shot of the film is a zoom in on a punching bag hanging in an empty boxing gym while the cheers of a crowd are heard.

== Cast ==
- Kahori Fujii as Hizuru
- Shinya Tsukamoto as Tsuda Yoshiharu
- Kōji Tsukamoto as Kojima Takuji
- Naomasa Musaka as Hase, trainer
- Naoto Takenaka as Ohizumi, trainer
- Koichi Wajima as Shirota, gym owner
- Tomorowo Taguchi as the Tattoo Master
- Nobu Kanaoka as a Nurse

== Release ==
Tokyo Fist premiered in September 1995 at the Turin Film Festival in Italy. It was released in Japanese theaters on October 21, 1995.

== Reception ==
In Japan, Tokyo Fist was placed on some publications best of the year list, including Kinema Junpo.

== See also ==
- List of Japanese films of 1995

== Notes ==
=== References ===
- Mes, Tom (2005). Iron Man. The Cinema of Shinya Tsukamoto. Fab Press. ISBN 1-903254-35-3.
