= Shinya Tsukamoto =

Japanese director, producer, writer, and actor (born 1960)

- 塚本晋也
- Tsukamoto in 2026
- Born: January 1, 1960 (age 66); Tokyo, Japan
- Occupations: Actor, film director, screenwriter, cinematographer, editor, producer, production designer/art director
- Years active: 1974–present
- Movement: Japanese cyberpunk
- Website: 塚本晋也 Official Website

Shinya Tsukamoto (塚本 晋也, Tsukamoto Shin'ya; born January 1, 1960) is a Japanese filmmaker and actor. With a considerable cult following both domestically and abroad, Tsukamoto is best known for his science fiction horror film Tetsuo: The Iron Man (1989), which is considered the defining film of the Japanese cyberpunk movement, as well as for its companion pieces Tetsuo II: Body Hammer (1992) and Tetsuo: The Bullet Man (2009). His other films include Tokyo Fist (1995), Bullet Ballet (1998), A Snake of June (2002), Vital (2004), Kotoko (2011) and Killing (2018).

In addition to starring in almost all his films, Tsukamoto has also appeared as an actor in films by other directors, including Martin Scorsese, Takashi Miike and Hideaki Anno. He has been cited as an influence on popular western filmmakers such as Quentin Tarantino, David Fincher, Darren Aronofsky and The Wachowskis.

== Biography ==
Tsukamoto began making films at age 14, when his father gave him a Super 8 camera. He made a number of films, ranging from 10-minute shorts to 2-hour features, until his first year at college when he temporarily lost interest in filmmaking. Tsukamoto then started up a theatre group, which soon included Kei Fujiwara, Nobu Kanaoka and Tomorowo Taguchi, all of whom would continue to work with Tsukamoto up through the filming of Tetsuo: The Iron Man. One of their theatre productions at this time was The Adventures of Electric Rod Boy. At the end of production, Tsukamoto did not want to waste all the effort they had put into building the set, so he decided to shoot a film version.

Tsukamoto's early films, The Phantom of Regular Size (1986) and The Adventures Of Electric Rod Boy (1987), were short subject science fiction films shot on colour 8 mm film that led to his black & white 16 mm feature Tetsuo: The Iron Man. Tsukamoto has stated he has a love-hate relationship with Tokyo, and in the end the characters (Tsukamoto and Taguchi) set out to destroy it. Tetsuo is considered one of the prime examples of Japanese cyberpunk.

Tsukamoto's next film, Hiruko the Goblin, was a more conventional horror film, about demons being unleashed from the gates of hell. He then created a follow-up to Tetsuo, Tetsuo II: Body Hammer (1992), which revisited many of the same themes as the first but with a bigger budget and shot in colour on 35 mm film. As a result, the film is often interpreted more as a companion piece than a true sequel. In Body Hammer, the son of a salaryman (Taguchi) is kidnapped by a group of thugs, who then force the man's nascent rage to make him mutate into a gigantic human weapon. Tokyo Fist (1995) again dealt with the idea of rage as a transformative force (similar to David Cronenberg's The Brood [1979]). Here, a meek insurance salesman (Tsukamoto) discovers that an old friend of his, now a semi-professional boxer, may be having an affair with his fiancée. The salesman then enters into a rigorous and self-destructive boxing training program to get even.

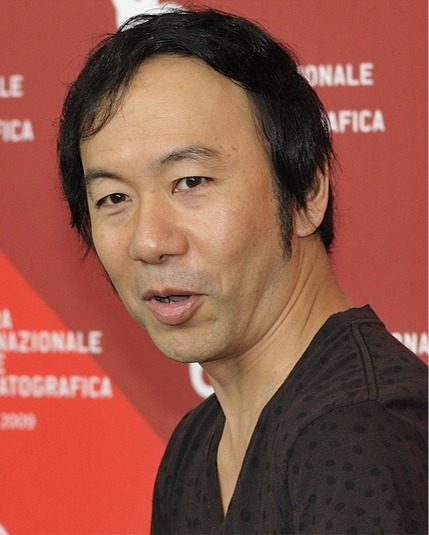
Tsukamoto in 2009

In Bullet Ballet (1998), a man (Tsukamoto) discovers that his longtime girlfriend committed suicide with a gun, and becomes obsessed with getting a gun just like that one. His single minded behaviour causes him to run afoul of a gang of thugs, especially when he shows interest in the young girl who is one of their compatriots. Gemini (1999) was an adaptation of an Edogawa Rampo story, in which a country doctor with pretensions of superiority has his life torn apart when another man who appears to be his exact duplicate enters his life. Things are complicated further by the twin taking control of his wife, an amnesiac with a criminal background. A Snake of June (2002) once again found Tsukamoto employing the formula of two men in competition for one woman, as a young lady is blackmailed into perverse sexual behaviour against her husband's will—until her husband finds that he enjoys the blackmail more than the blackmailer does.

Vital (2004) again features a love triangle, this time consisting of two women and one man. The story concerns a young man whose girlfriend is killed in a car crash whilst being driven by him. He is a medical student and is given her body to dissect in class (whether by coincidence or intentionally is not clear). Tsukamoto also acted in and directed the short film Haze in 2005. In 2006, Tsukamoto directed the horror thriller Nightmare Detective (2006). The film centres around a vagrant with the supernatural ability to enter the dreams of others and a police officer who pleads with him to help her solve a series of bizarre murders committed by a serial killer (Tsukamoto) with a similar ability.

Tsukamoto acts in nearly all of his films, with the exception of those that he worked on as a "director for hire" (namely Hiruko the Goblin and Gemini). Tsukamoto has appeared in many other directors' films as well, such as Takashi Miike's Dead or Alive 2: Birds (2000) and Ichi the Killer (2001), as well as Teruo Ishii's Blind Beast vs. Dwarf (2001). He was the lead actor in Takashi Shimizu's Marebito (2004), and appeared more recently in Welcome to the Quiet Room (2007), Martin Scorsese's Silence (2016), and Hideaki Anno's Shin Godzilla (2016) and Shin Kamen Rider (2023).

He is also a successful voiceover artist for TV advertising in Japan. He also provided the Japanese voice of Vamp in the 2008 PlayStation 3 game Metal Gear Solid 4: Guns of the Patriots. Tsukamoto was originally set to play the character in Metal Gear Solid 2: Sons of Liberty (after Hideo Kojima's first choice, Kaneto Shiozawa, died before casting began) but was unavailable due to scheduling conflicts, so Ryōtarō Okiayu was assigned the role instead.

Tsukamoto was a member of the jury at the Venice International Film Festival in 1997 and 2019.

== Filmography ==
=== Feature films ===
Year	English Title	Original Title	Director	Writer	Producer	DoP	Editor	Notes
1989	Tetsuo: The Iron Man	鉄男	Yes	Yes	Yes	Yes	Yes	Also art director, lighting and special effects
1991	Hiruko the Goblin	妖怪ハンター ヒルコ	Yes	Yes	No	No	Yes	
1992	Tetsuo II: Body Hammer	鉄男II	Yes	Yes	Yes	Yes	Yes	Also art director
1995	Tokyo Fist	東京フィスト	Yes	Yes	Yes	Yes	Yes	Also art director
1998	Sunday Drive		No	No	Yes	No	No	
1998	Bullet Ballet	バレット・バレエ	Yes	Yes	Yes	Yes	Yes	Also art director
1999	Gemini	双生児	Yes	Yes	No	Yes	Yes	
2002	A Snake of June	六月の蛇	Yes	Yes	Yes	Yes	Yes	Also production designer
2004	Vital	ヴィタール	Yes	Yes	Yes	Yes	Yes	Also production designer
2006	Nightmare Detective	悪夢探偵	Yes	Yes	Yes	Yes	Yes	Also art director
2008	Nightmare Detective 2	悪夢探偵2	Yes	Yes	Yes	Yes	Yes	
2009	Tetsuo: The Bullet Man	鉄男 THE BULLET MAN	Yes	Yes	Yes	Yes	Yes	Also uncredited production designer and gaffer
2011	Kotoko	KOTOKO	Yes	Yes	Yes	Yes	Yes	Also production designer
2014	Fires on the Plain	野火	Yes	Yes	Yes	Yes	Yes	Also production designer
2018	Killing	斬、	Yes	Yes	Yes	Yes	Yes	
2023	Shadow of Fire	ほかげ	Yes	Yes	Yes	Yes	Yes	
2026	Mr. Nelson, Did You Kill People?	ネルソンさん、あなたは人を殺しましたか？	Yes	Yes	No	Yes	Yes	

=== Student films ===
Year	Title	Director	Writer	Producer	DoP	Editor	Visual effects	Art director
1974	Genshi-san	Yes	Yes	Yes	Yes	Yes	Yes	Yes
1975	Story of a Giant Cockroach	Yes	Yes	Yes	Yes	Yes	Yes	Yes
1975	Wings	Yes	Yes	Yes	Yes	Yes	Yes	Yes
1976	Cloudy	Yes	Yes	Yes	Yes	Yes	Yes	Yes
1977	It Flew in Hell	Yes	Yes	Yes	Yes	Yes	Yes	Yes
1978	New Wings	Yes	Yes	Yes	Yes	Yes	Yes	Yes
1979	Flying Lotus Flower	Yes	Yes	Yes	Yes	Yes	Yes	Yes

=== Short films ===
Year	Title	Director	Writer	Producer	DoP	Editor	Notes
1985	Terry 100 Channels	Yes	No	No	No	No	Animated short
1986	The Phantom of Regular Size	Yes	Yes	Yes	Yes	Yes	
1987	The Adventure of Denchu-Kozo	Yes	Yes	Yes	Yes	Yes	Also art director, lighting and special effects
2005	Haze	Yes	Yes	Yes	Yes	Yes	Segment of Jeonju Digital Project; Two existing versions (25 mins, 49 mins); Also art director
2005	Tamamushi	Yes	No	No	Yes	Yes	Segment of Female
2013	Abandoned Monster	Yes	Yes	Yes	Yes	Yes	Segment for the film "Venice 70: Future Reloaded"; Co-directed with Kounsuke Tsukamoto

=== Television ===
Year	Title	Director	Writer	Producer	DoP	Editor	Notes
2003	Kiko Rodoku: Meisekai of Japan	Yes	Yes	Yes	Yes	Yes	Episode "Lizard"
2013	Kaidan Horror Classics	Yes	Yes	Yes	Yes	Yes	Episode "Hazakura and Maube"

=== Commercials ===
- MTV Japan Station - Nine Inch Nails (1993)
- Ca'Foscari Cinema (2011)

=== Acting roles ===
Film

Year	Title	Role	Director	Notes	Ref.
1986	The Phantom of Regular Size		Himself	Short film	
1987	The Adventure of Denchu-Kozo	Kondo	Himself	Medium-length film	
1989	Tetsuo: The Iron Man	Metal Fetishist	Himself		
1992	Tetsuo II: Body Hammer	Yatsu (The Guy)	Himself		
1994	The Most Terrible Time in My Life	Yamaguchi	Kaizo Hayashi		
1994	119	Masaaki Tomita	Naoto Takenaka		
1995	The Stairway to the Distant Past	Yamaguchi	Kaizo Hayashi		
1995	Tokyo Fist	Tsuda Yoshiharu	Himself		
1996	Some Kinda Love		Shunichi Nagasaki		
1996	Atlanta Boogie		Masashi Yamamoto		
1997	Tōkyō Biyori		Naoto Takenaka		
1998	Sunday Drive		Hisashi Saito		
1998	Bullet Ballet	Goda	Himself		
1998	Wait and See	Doctor	Shinji Sōmai		
1999	Dogs		Shunichi Nagasaki		
1999	The Perfect Education	Moriyama	Ben Wada		
1999	Sunday's Dream		Yōichirō Takahashi		
2000	Dead or Alive 2: Birds	Magician Higashino	Takashi Miike		
2000	Sakuya: The Slayer of Demons	Wizard	Tomoo Haraguchi		
2001	Quartet for Two	Yuuenchi no otoko	Naoto Takenaka		
2001	Chloe	Eisuke	Gō Rijū		
2001	Blind Beast vs. Dwarf	Kogorō Akechi	Teruo Ishii		
2001	Ichi the Killer	Jijii	Takashi Miike		
2001	A Drowning Man	Tokio	Naoki Ichio	Lead role	
2002	Travail	Kazuya Miyamae	Kentarō Ōtani		
2002	A Snake of June	Michiro Iguchi	Himself		
2004	Tracing Jake		Isshin Inudo		
2004	Marebito	Masuoka	Takashi Shimizu	Lead role	
2004	Otakus in Love	Noro	Suzuki Matsuo		
2005	Haze		Himself	Medium-length film	
2006	Nightmare Detective	"O"	Himself		
2007	Welcome to the Quiet Room	Asuka's ex-husband	Suzuki Matsuo		
2009	Tetsuo: The Bullet Man	Yatsu (The Guy)	Himself		
2011	Kotoko	Seitaro Tanaka	Himself		
2013	The Road Less Travelled	Sousuke Akiyama	Tomoyuki Furumaya		
2014	Fires on the Plain	Tamura	Himself		
2016	Shin Godzilla	Kunio Hazama	Hideaki Anno; Shinji Higuchi		
2016	Over the Fence	Satoshi's Father	Nobuhiro Yamashita	Voice	
2016	Scoop!	Taka	Hitoshi Ōne		
2016	Silence	Mokichi	Martin Scorsese	American film	
2018	Killing	Jirozaemon Sawamura	Himself		
2021	Kiba: The Fangs of Fiction	Tamio Takano	Daihachi Yoshida		
2021	DIVOC-12	Manager	Shin'ichiro Ueda		
2023	Shin Kamen Rider	Hiroshi Midorikawa	Hideaki Anno		
2025	Hero's Island	Tokusho	Keishi Otomo		
2026	The Brightest Sun		Tetsuya Nakashima		

Television

Year	Title	Role	Notes	Ref.
2007	Sexy Voice and Robo			
2009–2011	Clouds Over the Hill	Akashi Motojiro		
2010	GeGeGe no Nyōbō		Asadora	
2012	Carnation	Takeshi Haraguchi	Asadora	
2016	Tokyo Trial	Michio Takeyama		
2018	Half Blue Sky	Prof. Usakawa	Asadora	
2019	Idaten	Michimasa Soejima	Taiga drama	
2021	Welcome Home, Monet	Tomohisa "Tom-san" Tanaka		
2022	Lost Man Found	Himself		
2023	A Day-Off of Hana Sugisaki		Episode 2	

=== Japanese dub ===
Year	Title	Role	Notes	Ref.
2024	Blind Willow, Sleeping Woman	Katagiri		

== Accolades ==
As per references:

- The Adventures of Electric Rod Boy – PIA Film Fest (Japan) – Grand Prize
- Tetsuo: The Iron Man – Fantafestival (Italy) – Grand Prize
- Tetsuo: The Iron Man – Sweden Fantastic Film Festival – Audience Award Best Feature
- Hiruko the Goblin – Fantasporto – Best Film
- Tetsuo II: Body Hammer – Brussels International Festival of Fantasy Film – Silver Raven
- Tetsuo II: Body Hammer – Fantasporto – International Fantasy Film Special Jury Award
- Tetsuo II: Body Hammer – 3rd Yubari International Fantastic Film Festival (1992)
- Tokyo Fist – Sundance (Tokyo) – Grand Prize
- Bullet Ballet – Sweden Fantastic Film Festival – Jury Grand Prize
- Gemini – Neuchatel International Fantasy Film Festival – Best International Film
- A Snake of June – Venice Film Festival – Kinematrix Film Award Feature Films
- A Snake of June – Venice Film Festival – San Marco Special Jury Award
- Vital – Brussels International Festival of Fantasy Film – Silver Raven
- Vital – Sitges – Catalan International Film Festival – New Visions Award
- Vital – Fantasporto – Orient Express Section Special Jury Award
- Kotoko – The Orizzonti prize at the 68th Venice International Film Festival (2011)

== See also ==
- Shozin Fukui
- Sogo Ishii
