= Kōki Mitani =

Japanese playwright, screenwriter, actor and film director

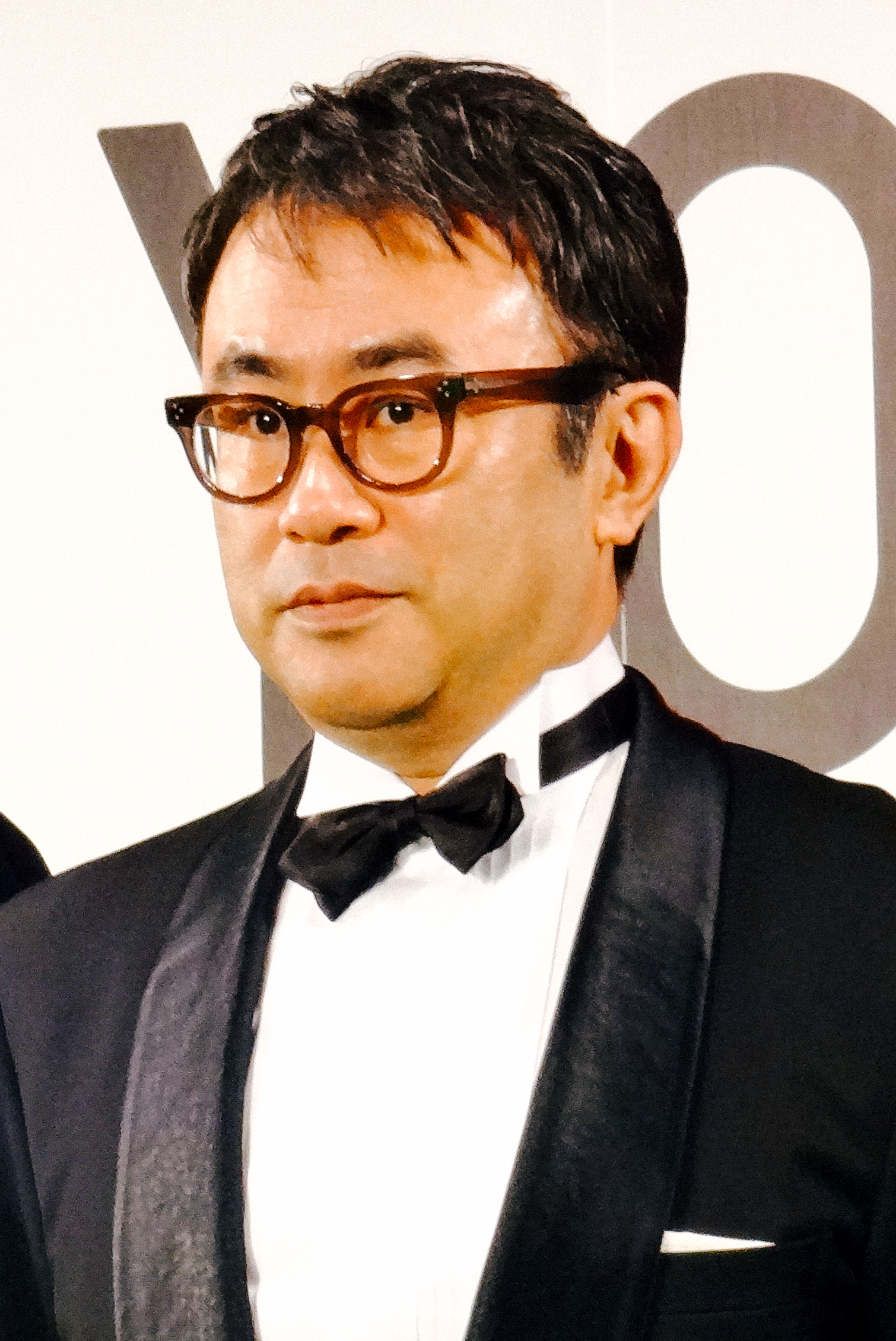
- Mitani at the 2014 Tokyo International Film Festival
- Born: July 8, 1961 (age 65); Setagaya, Tokyo
- Occupations: Playwright, screenwriter, actor, film director

Kōki Mitani (三谷 幸喜, Mitani Kōki; born July 8, 1961) is a Japanese playwright, screenwriter, actor and film director. He was named after Taihō Kōki, the youngest sumo wrestler to become yokozuna. He studied dramatics at Nihon University. He has been described by The Japan Times as "far and away the nation's best-known dramatist".

In an attempt to add his own character to his movies, his directorial approach follows a "one scene = one shot" system, whereby he pans the camera around as opposed to cutting. He claims this comes from his experience in theatre, where there are no cuts. Mitani does not use a computer.

== Early life ==
Mitani liked watching TV dramas and puppetries of NHK in his childhood. He was especially interested in works of puppetry such as Shin Hakkenden (新八犬伝) and Sangokushi (三国志), jidaigeki dramas such as Tenka Gomen and Tenka Dōdō, and taiga dramas such as Kaze to Kumo to Niji to.

Throughout his life, he has expressed interest in works starring famous detectives, such as the Sherlock Holmes series. He has collected numerous novel volumes, pastiches, and DVDs related to Sherlock Holmes, and in 2014 adapted the story into a puppetry set in a boarding school. In his high school days, he planned to produce a film featuring a detective, loosely based on And Then There Were None, and went on location to Enoshima, Kanagawa with his friends, although this film was never finished.

Mitani has also stated that he enjoys foreign cinema, and is a fan of the films 12 Angry Men, The Wages of Fear, Columbo, and the director Billy Wilder. He has mentioned how he believes modern-day Hollywood comedy films are not as funny as those from the Golden Age.

Mitani was previously married to Japanese actress Satomi Kobayashi.

== Career ==
Mitani's work has primarily comprised witty comedies which are often parodies. In production, he usually writes scripts visualizing actors and actresses as close to the characters. Mitani is the author of a weekly column in the Asahi Shimbun daily newspaper in which he often discusses his favorite films, his writing process, and the actors and actresses with whom he has worked.

In 2018, Mitani appeared in a "Silent Library" segment of Gaki no Tsukai.

In 2023, Mitani was the recipient of the 15th annual Juzo Itami Award.

== Works ==
=== Films ===
Note: Many of Mitani's films began as successful plays.

==== Feature films ====
- The Gentle 12 a.k.a. 12-nin no Yasashii Nihonjin (1991; screenplay)
- Welcome Back, Mr. McDonald (1997; director, screenplay)
- Minna no Ie a.k.a. All About Our House (2001; director, screenplay)
- University of Laughs a.k.a. Warai no Daigaku (2004; screenplay)
- The Uchōten Hotel a.k.a. Suite Dreams (2006; director, screenplay)
- The Magic Hour (2008; director and screenplay)
- A Ghost of a Chance a.k.a. Suteki na Kanashibari, also known as Once in a Blue Moon (2011; director, screenplay)
- The Kiyosu Conference (2013; director, screenplay)
- Galaxy Turnpike (2015; director, screenplay)
- Hit Me Anyone One More Time (2019; director, screenplay)
- All About Suomi (2024; director, screenplay)

==== Television films ====
- short cut (2011 one-shot film; director, screenplay)
- Daikūkō 2013 aka Airport 2013 (2013 one-shot film; director, screenplay)
- Oi, Dazai (2025 one-shot film; director, screenplay)

=== TV dramas ===
- Furikaereba Yatsu ga Iru (1993 series; screenplay)
- Furuhata Ninzaburō (1994–2004 series; screenplay)
- Shinsengumi! (2004 TV taiga drama; screenplay)
- Sōri to Yobanaide (1997 series; screenplay)
- Wagaya no Rekishi (2010 series; screenplay)
- Sanada Maru (2016 taiga drama; screenplay)
- Fūnji-tachi (2018 series; screenplay)
- Kuroido Goroshi (2018 series; screenplay)
- The 13 Lords of the Shogun (2022 taiga drama)
- Pray Speak What Has Happened AKA Moshimo Kono Yo ga Butai nara, Gakuya wa Doko ni Aru no Darou (2025 series; screenplay)

=== Theatre ===
- The Gentle Twelve a.k.a. 12-nin no Yasashii Nihonjin (1990)
- The Show Must Go On (1991)
- University of Laughs a.k.a. Warai no Daigaku (1996)
- Vamp Show (2006)
- Talk Like Singing (2009)
- Odessa (2024)

=== Puppetries ===
- The Three Musketeers (2009; screenplay)
- Sherlock Holmes (2014; screenplay)

== Recurring cast members ==
| Actor | Furuhata Ninzaburō (1994–2006) | Welcome Back, Mr. McDonald (1997) | Aikotoba wa Yūki (2000) | Minna no Ie (2001) | Shinsengumi! (2004) | The Uchōten Hotel (2006) | The Magic Hour (2008) | Wagaya no Rekishi (2010) | A Ghost of a Chance (2011) | The Kiyosu Conference (2013) | Galaxy Turnpike (2015) | Sanada Maru (2016) | Hit Me Anyone One More Time (2019) |
|---|---|---|---|---|---|---|---|---|---|---|---|---|---|
| Toshiyuki Nishida (78) | | | | | | check | check | check | check | check | check | | |
| Fumiyo Kohinata (72) | check | | | check | check | | check | check | check | check | | check | |
| Kōji Yakusho (70) | | | check | | | check | | check | | check | | | |
| Keiko Toda (68) | check | check | | check | check | check | check | check | check | check | | | |
| Kōichi Satō (65) | | | | | check | check | check | check | check | check | check | | check |
| Masahiko Nishimura (65) | check | check | | | | | | | | | | check | |
| Yoshimasa Kondo (65) | check | check | | check | | check | check | check | check | check | | check | |
| Kiichi Nakai (64) | | | | check | | | check | check | check | | | | check |
| Kenji Anan (64) | | | | | check | check | check | check | check | check | check | check | |
| Toshiaki Karasawa (63) | check | check | check | check | | check | check | | check | | | | |
| Susumu Terajima (62) | | | | | | check | check | check | | check | | check | |
| Zen Kajihara (60) | check | check | check | check | | check | check | check | check | check | check | | |
| Kyōka Suzuki (58) | | check | check | check | check | | check | | | check | | check | |
| Eri Fukatsu (53) | | | | | | | check | | check | | | | |
| Yo Oizumi (53) | | | | | | | | check | | check | | check | |
| Masato Sakai (52) | | | | | check | | | | | | | check | |
| Koji Yamamoto (49) | | | | | check | | check | check | check | | check | check | |
| Shingo Katori (49) | check | | check | check | check | check | check | | | | check | | |
| Yūko Takeuchi (46) | | | | | | | | | check | | | check | |
| Satoshi Tsumabuki (45) | | | | | | | check | | | check | | | |
| Haruka Ayase (41) | | | | | | | check | | | | check | | |

== Honors ==
- Medal with Purple Ribbon (2017)
- Juzo Itami Award (2023)
