= Hit Me Anyone One More Time =

2019 film directed by Kōki Mitani

- DVD cover
- Directed by: Kōki Mitani
- Screenplay by: Kōki Mitani
- Produced by: Kuga Maeda; Kazutoshi Wadakura
- Starring: Kiichi Nakai; Dean Fujioka; Yuriko Ishida; Eiko Koike; Yuki Saito; Yoshino Kimura; Yō Yoshida; Takashi Yamaguchi; Masao Kusakari; Kōichi Satō
- Cinematography: Hideo Yamamoto
- Edited by: Soichi Ueno
- Music by: Kiyoko Ogino
- Production company: Toho
- Distributed by: Toho
- Release date: September 13, 2019 (Japan)
- Running time: 127 minutes
- Country: Japan
- Language: Japanese

Hit Me Anyone One More Time (Japanese: 記憶にございません!, Hepburn: Kioku ni Gozaimasen) is a 2019 Japanese political comedy film directed by Kōki Mitani. It stars Kiichi Nakai. Mitani wrote a script for a similar political drama series Sōrito Yobanaide aired on Fuji TV in 1997.

The film was adapted into a stage musical by the Takarazuka Revue Star Troupe, starring Makoto Rei and Hitomi Maisora. It premiered at the Takarazuka Grand Theater on August 17, 2024.

== Plot ==
The main character of the film is the prime minister, who is hated by the people as he is a corrupt politician. One day, a stone thrown by a man who hates Prime Minister Keisuke Kuroda hits Kuroda's head, causing memory loss; he wakes up in a hospital. He watches TV and is surprised to find out that he is the prime minister hated by people.

== Cast ==
- Kiichi Nakai as the Prime Minister Keisuke Kuroda
- Dean Fujioka as Isaka
- Yuriko Ishida as Satoko Kuroda
- Eiko Koike as Nozomi Banba
- Yuki Saito as Suga-san
- Takashi Yamaguchi
- Kei Tanaka as Heitarō Ōzeki
- Takahiro Fujimoto
- Takaya Sakoda
- Zen Kajihara
- Takashi Kobayashi
- Kenji Anan
- Yoshimasa Kondō
- Kazuki Iio
- Junpei Gotō
- Jay Kabira
- Yuta Ozawa
- Yūki Amami
- Yumiko Udō as a news presenter
- Tatsuomi Hamada as Atsuhiko Kuroda
- Susumu Terajima
- Rolly Teranishi
- Kōichi Yamadera as Various Voices
- Emma Miyazawa as Jet Wada
- Yō Yoshida as Akane Yamanishi
- Yoshino Kimura as the president of the United States
- Masao Kusakari as Daigo Tsurumaru
- Kōichi Satō as Tasuku Furugōri

== Awards ==
- Hochi Film Awards Best Actor : Kiichi Nakai
- Blue Ribbon Awards Best Actor : Kiichi Nakai

== Adaptations ==
In 2024, Takarazuka Revue Star Troupe staged a musical production of the film, titled "Hit Me Anyone One More Time -Top Secret-". It was directed by Masaya Ishida, starring the Star Troupe, including Top Stars Makoto Rei and Hitomi Maisora. It premiered at the Takarazuka Grand Theater on August 17th.
