= Zen Kajihara =

Japanese actor (born 1966)

- Born: 25 February 1966 (age 60)
- Occupation: Actor
- Years active: 1985–present

Zen Kajihara (梶原 善, Kajihara Zen; born 25 February 1966 in Okayama), is a Japanese theatre actor. Originally a member of the Tokyo Sunshine Boys theatrical troupe, he now works mainly with the Gekidan Shinkansen troupe.

He is known for being very short in stature, but very noisy and wild on stage, specializing in comedy. He had a problem reading kanji (Chinese characters) and insists that his roles have long, complicated, difficult-to-remember names.

== Filmography ==
=== Films ===
- The Gentle 12 (1991), Juror 7
- Welcome Back, Mr. McDonald (1997)
- Minna no Ie (2001)
- The Grudge 2 (2006)
- The Uchoten Hotel (2006)
- The Kiyosu Conference (2013), Koichirō
- Galaxy Turnpike (2015)
- Black Widow Business (2016)
- Masquerade Hotel (2019)
- Hit Me Anyone One More Time (2019)
- Masquerade Night (2021)
- The Confidence Man JP: Episode of the Hero (2022)
- Do Unto Others (2023)
- We're Broke, My Lord! (2023)
- Nightmare Resort (2023)
- Yudo: The Way of the Bath (2023)
- What If Shogun Ieyasu Tokugawa Was to Become the Prime Minister (2024), Keiichi Morimoto
- House of Sayuri (2024)
- All About Suomi (2024)
- Hey, Dazai: The Movie (2025), Jiro Darai

=== Television ===
- Furikaereba Yatsu ga Iru (1993)
- Furuhata Ninzaburō (1994–99)
- Oosama no Restaurant (1995)
- The Waste Land (2009)
- The Emperor's Cook (2015), Emperor Hirohito
- Here Comes Asa! (2015), Genkichi Miyabe
- The 13 Lords of the Shogun (2022), Zenji
- DCU: Deep Crime Unit (2022), Hideki Bando (Ep. 2)
- Hayabusa Fire Brigade (2023), Yōsuke Morino
- Hey, Dazai (2025), Jiro Darai
- Scandal Eve (2025), Tetsuya Igarashi
