= Yoshimasa Kondo =

Japanese actor (born 1961)

Yoshimasa Kondo (近藤 芳正, Kondō Yoshimasa) (born August 13, 1961 in Nagoya, Japan) is a Japanese theatre and film actor.

== Biography ==
He debuted as an extra in the series Chu-gaku-sei Nikki and was later written into the script. He later gained notability while working with the theatrical troupe Tokyo Sunshine Boys, though he is not a member of the group. Kondo continues to work with the Tokyo Sunshine Boys leader and director Mitani Koki, however, in all of his movies after the troupe disbanded.

Now, Kondo plays secondary roles in Japanese films.

== Filmography ==
=== Film ===
- Cyclops (1987)
- The Gentle 12 (1991)
- Welcome Back, Mr. McDonald (1997)
- Minna no Ie (2001)
- Suite Hotel (2006)
- The Magic Hour (2008)
- The Kiyosu Conference (2013)
- Ringside Story (2017)
- Katsu Fūtarō!! (2019)
- Kamata Prelude (2020)
- Remain In Twilight (2021)
- The Supporting Actors: The Movie (2021), himself
- The Mukoda Barber Shop (2022)
- In Love and Deep Water (2023)
- Be My Guest, Be My Baby (2023)
- River (2023)
- Knuckle Girl (2023)
- The Women in the Lakes (2024)
- Bishu: The World's Kindest Clothes (2024), Yoichi Inage
- Unfounded (2025)
- Catching the Stars of This Summer (2025)
- There Was Such a Thing Before (2025)
- Ice on the Moon (2025)
- The Samurai and the Prisoner (2026), Nakanishi Shinpachiro
- Shadow Work (2026)

=== Television ===
- Furuhata Ninzaburō (1996, 2006)
- GTO (1998)
- Furin Kazan (2007), Aiki Ichibei
- 4 Shimai Tantei Dan (2008)
- Gunshi Kanbei, (2014), Shibata Katsuie
- Sanada Maru (2016), Hirano Nagayasu
- Happy Marriage!? (2016), Satoru Mamiya
- Segodon (2018), Tanaka Yūnosuke
- Natsuzora: Natsu's Sky (2019), Ken'ya Nogami
- Shiroi Kyotō (2019)
- The Supporting Actors 3 (2021), himself
- Reach Beyond the Blue Sky (2021), Kijūrō Shidehara
- Come Come Everybody (2021–22), Yōsuke Kogure
- Bakumatsu Aibō-den (2022), Sagawa Kanbei
- Boogie Woogie (2023), Tatsuo Yamashita
