= The Show Must Go On (play) =

The Show Must Go On (ショウ・マスト・ゴー・オン) is a play by Kōki Mitani, written in 1991 for his theatre group Tokyo Sunshine Boys. It was so popular in Japan that it brought media fame to the entire company and gained its star actor Masahiko Nishimura an award for Best Actor, in that year's Japanese Theatre Awards.

In November 2022, the show was revived starring Yuta Ozawa.
