= Tokyo Sunshine Boys =

The Tokyo Sunshine Boys (東京サンシャインボーイズ, Tōkyō Sanshain Bōizu) is a Japanese theatrical troupe that was active from 1983 until about 1994. Since it disbanded almost all of its members have continued acting on theatre and in film.

== History ==
The group was originally designed by screenwriter Mitani Kōki, a young writer who at that time had aspirations of becoming a comedian. Although he starred in a number of the troupe's plays, he was primarily the resident playwright. The main three actors were Nishimura Masahiko (who went on to win a number of Japanese Academy Awards and the Blue Ribbon award), Aijima Kazuyuki, and Kajiwara Zen. All of the primary actors being about the same age, the existence of the group proved to be a milestone in the then-developing Japanese theatre field of Sho-Gekijo, or 'Little Theatre.' Sho-Gekijo mainly focused on making theatre accessible to the proletariat as opposed to a then-popular philosophical art which arguably required a degree of education to appreciate.

The troupe finally hit it big in 1991 with their remake of the Reginald Rose work Twelve Angry Men. It was rewritten into a comedy (since there is no such jury system in Japan) called 12 Gentle Japanese (Japanese title: Juuni-nin no Yasashii Nihonjin). The success of this play eventually encouraged the production of a movie directed by Nakahara Shun. However, since the play was registered as created by Mitani Koki as opposed to "The Sunshine Boys", the producers took over and held auditions for the cast. Only three of the then 13 Tokyo Sunshine Boys made it onto the cast: Aijima Kazuyuki, Kajiwara Zen, and Kondo Yoshimasa.

From that point on, Mitani Kōki as the writer for the Tokyo Sunshine Boys as well as the actors themselves, got flooded with offers to work on other TV dramas, plays and movies. As a result of an increasingly busy schedule for the individual member, the group finally disbanded in 1994 with a final performance called Tokyo Sunshine Boys no Min.

The group promises to get together again for a 30-year reunion in the year 2024 with a specialised performance of King Lear which will star Kajiwara Zen.

== Style ==
The Tokyo Sunshine Boys was named after the play The Sunshine Boys by director Neil Simon. They specialised in situation comedy, a form of theatre originating in radio that got its laughs from the awkward situations their characters were placed in as opposed to the more traditional protagonist vs. antagonist plots. Mitani Kōki had a special admiration for Neil Simon and Woody Allen, both writers who also specialised in situation comedy.

The Tokyo Sunshine Boys grew in popularity due to their un-intrusive, lighthearted, and easy-to-understand style. The topics of their plays never covered anything taboo or political in nature, and so were unoffensive to everyone. Their stories specialised in the creation of a work - be it a play, a radio drama, or a house - of people cooperating, a multitude of opinions being brought into consideration, and the pros and cons thereof. The plays always had a happy ending.

=== Adaptations ===
The 1997 film Welcome Back, Mr. McDonald, was based on the play "The Radio Time" by Mitani Kōki and performed by the Tokyo Sunshine Boys.

== Members ==
The writer and director of most of the plays was Mitani Kōki. He also acted occasionally under the pseudonym of Hitotsubashi Sōtaro.

=== Primary members ===
- Aijima Kazuyuki
- Nishimura Masahiko
- Kajiwara Zen (currently works primarily with the Gekidan Shinkansen theatrical troupe)

=== Secondary members ===
- Anan Kenji
- Toshihito Ito (Died in May 2002.)
- Kobayashi Takashi
- Koumoto Masahiro
- Matsushige Yutaka
- Miyaji Masako
- Obara Masato
- Saito Kiyoko (retired from acting.)

=== Later members ===
- Kondo Yoshimasa
- Nonaka Isao
