= Shingo Katori =

Japanese television personality (born 1977)

- 香取 慎吾
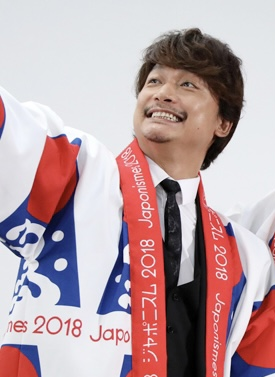
- Katori in 2018
- Born: 31 January 1977 (age 49); Yokohama, Japan
- Occupations: Singer; actor; television personality
- Years active: 1987–present
- Musical career
- Genre: J-pop
- Instruments: Vocals; guitar
- Years active: 1988–present
- Labels: Victor Entertainment; Warner Music
- Website: atarashiichizu.com

Shingo Katori (香取 慎吾, Katori Shingo; born 31 January 1977) is a Japanese actor, singer, television host, and radio personality. He was the youngest member of SMAP, one of the best-selling boy bands in Asia.

== Early life ==
Katori was born in Yokohama, Kanagawa and moved to Tokyo to pursue his career. He has one younger brother.

== Career as a pop star ==
=== Music ===
In 1987, at age 10, Katori auditioned for Johnny & Associates, a Japanese talent agency that recruits and trains young boys, preteens to teens, to become singers and members of boy bands. After five of the other band members auditioning individually from 1986 through 1987, in autumn 1987, twenty boys, from ages ten to seventeen, were put together into a group called The Skate Boys, which was initially created as backup dancers for a famous boy band, Hikaru Genji. In April 1988, producer Johnny Kitagawa chose six out of the twenty boys to create a new boy band and named them "SMAP".

After SMAP's disbandment on 31 December 2016, Katori has been pursuing his solo career. He left Johnny & Associates on 9 September 2017, together with two other SMAP members, Goro Inagaki and Tsuyoshi Kusanagi and entered CULEN, a Japanese talent agency. On 22 September 2017, they launched a new project, "atarashiichizu" ("新しい地図", meaning "New Map") as their common fan site, supported by various Japanese leading creators. Since then, Katori has been extending his activities also into artistic fields.

On January 1, 2020, Katori released his first solo album, entitled "20200101". The album features songs written by Katori, as well as collaborations with artists such as TeddyLoid, BiSH, Kreva, Kishidan, and Scha Dara Parr, and more. The album is said to be a celebration of the year 2020, with both the 2020 Summer Olympics and 2020 Summer Paralympics were scheduled to be held during that year. In 2021, Katori held his first solo concert entitled "Sakura Saku Rekishi Aru Meijiza de 20200101 ni Wani Wa Waiwai Katori Shingo", at the Meiji-za from April 4, 2021, to April 29, 2021. Katori also live streamed the last day of the concert on the streaming platform AbemaTV.

Katori's second solo album entitled "Tokyo SNG" was released on April 13, 2022. Inspired by numerous styles of jazz, from standard style to big band jazz, Katori wished to evoke the feeling of hearing "jazz in a tuxedo". He also contributed to writing some of the songs on the album, such as the titular "Tokyo SNG", "Kongaragatte", "Shingopation", and "Catharsis", to name a few. The album also features collaborations with WONK, Atarashii Gakko!, and the Zazen Boys.

On January 3, 2023, it was announced that Katori would be collaborating with popular K-Pop group Seventeen for a brand new song entitled "BETTING", to serve as the theme song for fellow ex-SMAP member Tsuyoshi Kusanagi's latest drama, War of Traps. Katori had met the group the year prior, leading to them collaborating on a song together. BETTING was co-produced by Katori, PLEDIS Entertainment producuer Bumzu, and SEVENTEEN member Woozi. Katori serves as the main vocal on the track, performing alongside SEVENTEEN's Mingyu, Jeonghan, and Seungkwan. It was released on streaming platforms on January 17, 2023.

=== Acting ===
In 1988, he made his acting debut in a television series, Abunai Shonen III, along with his band members. After several supporting roles, in 1996, he landed his first major role in a drama television series, Tomei Ningen, which became a massive success. He has also starred in many high-rated television series, such as Hito ni Yasashiku (2002), Saiyuki (2006), and Bara no nai Hanaya (2008). In 2004, he starred in NHK's Taiga drama, Shinsengumi!. He is also a member of the Mitani Crew, a core group of actors that Japanese playwright Kōki Mitani tends to use in his work.

In 2021, Katori starred in TV Tokyo's drama entitled Anonymous: Keishicho ”Yubisatsujin” Taisakushitsu. This was his first lead role on a TV Tokyo drama series, as well as his first broadcast drama series after five years. He also performed the main theme for the series, entitled "Anonymous (feat. WONK)", and released it on both digital storefronts and streaming platforms on February 1, 2021.

=== Shingo Mama ===
From October 1998, Nakai and Katori launched their own variety program, SataSma, which was created and aimed towards younger viewers and families. Katori starred in a segment titled, "Shingo Mama's Secret Breakfast", where Katori would cross-dress as a character called "Shingo Mama", and visit houses to cook breakfast for children instead of their mother, allowing her to sleep in and rest in the morning. Katori started to use the phrase, "Ohha", a pun for "Ohayo", meaning "good morning", during the segment as his trademark phrase, which soon became a popular word used among children. Shingo Mama, the lovable character Katori played, and the phrase "Ohha", became a social phenomenon. As a result, SMAP incidentally brought in kindergartners and preteens to their fan base.

On 16 August 2000, Katori released a single, "Shingo Mama's Oha Rock", as Shingo Mama, which reached number one on the charts with over 1,200,000 physical copies sold and became a social phenomenon. In December 2000, the trademark phrase "Ohha", used by Katori, won the Ryukougo Taisho, an annual traditional event of announcing words that describes that year. From 2000 to 2001, Shingo Mama promoted the use of Ohha as part of a Ministry of Education campaign to encourage family communication.

== Artistic career ==
"I’ve always loved painting for as long as I can remember," he said in an interview in his first book of illustration collection. He thinks he came to like painting because of the family background (his father was an art dealer). Katori displayed his artistic talent also at SMAP's concerts. He became in charge for staging of the concert tours, beginning from "super.modern.artistic.performance" (2008) through "We are SMAP" (2010) and "Gift of SMAP" (2012) until "Mr. S – saikou de saikou no CONCERT TOUR" (2014).

Katori has been creating and engaged in various artworks and projects:

- Painting on Tsugaru Railway's train car (1997). As a special project in the SMAP's long-run television variety show, “SMAPxSMAP”, Katori painted a train car together with local children. After the car ended its service in 2000, it was kept at Kanagi Station for the purpose of exhibition, then moved to Kase Station. In 2017, 20 years after the painting was made, Katori visited the Kase Station again in a TV show (“Oja MAP!!”) in order to restore the work. The car is now one of the touristic attractions in the region and visited by Katori's fans.
- Shingo no Itazura, an illustration collection book (1998), contains pictures published on magazine Wink Up and some new works created for this book.
- SNAP NO SHINGO, a photo diary for the period of one year from 16 October 2004 until 15 October 2005. The pictures were originally taken for "SmaTIMES" weekly paper published by a TV news variety show "SmaSTATION".
- Painting "Takarabako" ("Treasure Box", 2011). Appointed as an ambassador for a Cirque du Soleil show called "Kooza" in Japan, he painted a picture on a large canvas (1,800 x 1,500 mm), featuring characters and contents of the show. The painting was exhibited in the foyer during the Kooza's performance in Japan.
- Artwork "Kūsō Tamago" ("Fantasy Egg", 2014). After successful mission for "Kooza", Katori was again appointed as an ambassador for the next Cirque du Soleil"s performance in Japan, "OVO" and created an artwork featuring its motive "ovo", which means an "egg" in Portuguese. The artwork accompanied the show around Japan.
- Fashion Photo Book Fuku Baka Shifukubon (roughly "a book of happiest private wardrobe of a fashion freak", 2014). A photo book featuring Katori, known as a fashion freak, in his private clothes, coordinated by a noted fashion stylist, Tomoki Sukezane. For this book, Katori's private wardrobe was transported from his flat to the photo studio by two 2-ton trucks. The estimated total value of the "collection" built-up over 15 years was 200 million Yen.
- Art Exhibition "Museum of Together" held by The Nippon Foundation, at Aoyama Spiral Garden, Tokyo, Japan for 13–31 October 2017. With other 22 artists, Katori joined in the exhibition with his two paintings, "Hinotori" ("Fire Bird", 2014) and "Isoge mada maniau" ("Hurry Up, We Are Going to Be on Time", 2010). It was his first participation in an art exhibition.
- A special exhibition celebrating the 100th anniversary of Cartier’s icon watch TANK, at Cartier in Roppongi Hills, Tokyo, Japan for 28 October – 26 November 2017. Inspired by the legendary timepiece of the French luxury brand, Katori created a painting and an art work.
- Graffiti in Hong Kong, at the corner of Hollywood Road and Shalley Street, Old Town Central, unveiled on 27 March 2018. Requested by Hong Kong Tourism Board, a government-subvented body, Katori completed the graffiti on a 4.5m-high and 6m-wide wall beside the Mid-Levels Escalator within 18 hours. As the project was to be kept confidential, he worked with the covered wall for 3 continuous nights from midnight until 6 am.
- Exhibition "NAKAMA de ART" at the Imperial Hotel Plaza, Tokyo, Japan for 24 May – 24 June 2018. Together with 13 emerging artists he selected, Katori organized an art gallery under the name of "NAKAMA de ART". A literal translation of "nakama" is "buddy" or "mate", so the exhibition title could roughly mean "Let's do art together".
- Car Wrapping on BMW X2 (2018). Appointed as a "Brand Friend" of a BMW's SUV model X2, Katori was featured in its concept movie (a part of which was streamed also as TV advertisement later) and designed the car wrapping. The wrapped vehicle was exhibited at some special events.
- Fashion Brand and Permanent Pop-up Shop "jantje_ontembaar". Together with a noted stylist Tomoki Sukezane who knows Katori over 20 years, Katori started-up a fashion brand and opened its own boutique at the Imperial Hotel Plaza under concept "Permanent Pop-up Shop", meaning "a shop with ever changing contents for an unlimited period of time". The brand collaborates with well-respected manufacturers such as Sanyo Coat (by Sanyo Shokai), MINEDENIM and Borsalino. The brand name "jantje_ontembaar" comes from Dutch words "jantje" and "ontembaar" which are said to be origins of Japanese words "yancha" and "otenba", naughty boy and girl. With that, Katori and Sukezane want to encourage people to keep a heart of a child and think out-of-the-box.
- Exhibition "NAKAMA des ARTS" in Hall Charles V in the Louvre Museum (Carrousel du Louvre), Paris, France for 19 September – 3 October 2018. Katori's first solo exhibition occurred within the framework of Japonismes 2018, a cultural festival organized by France and Japan to celebrate the 160th anniversary of diplomatic relation between the two countries.
- Painting of Tokyo Tower. On the occasion of the 60th anniversary of the Tokyo Tower, the national public broadcasting of Japan, NHK put a special program "Miagereba anata wa itsumo sokoni" ("Thank you for being there every time when I look up") on air on 22 December 2018. In this program, Katori painted a picture featuring the Tokyo Tower. Katori often says that he likes the Tokyo Tower very much and the tower has been encouraging him a lot since he started his career in show business as a 11-year-old boy. In this work, he put colors on a night scenic photo of Tokyo he took by himself. It was the first time he utilized this art technique. The painting was exhibited on the Main Deck of the Tokyo Tower for the period from 2 February until 8 March 2019, then in "boum! boum! boum!" (see below), Katori's first solo exhibition in Japan after the world's premiere in Paris, France in 2018.
- Painting "New Year Woman". For the first issue of a triannual magazine, Shūkanbunshun Woman, launched on 29 December 2019, Katori created a picture on a 1303 x 970 mm canvas. Shūkanbunshun is a well-established weekly magazine started in 1959, published by a leading Japanese publishing company, Kabushikigaisha Bungeishunjū (Bungeishunjū Ltd.). Shūkanbunshun Woman is its special edition targeting female readers. The picture is to be seen in Katori's exhibition "boum! boum! boum!" (see below).
- Blog "kūsō fantejī" ("fantasy" in Japanese and in French). Starting from 1 January 2019, he has been posting a short fantasy story almost every day with a black-and-white picture he paints. These pictures form a part of his exhibition "boum! boum! boum!" (see below).
- Painting "Freedom Gan’nen" ("First Year of Freedom"), exhibited in front of Tokyo Midtown Hibiya for the New Year's period of 2 – 14 January 2019, then in "boum! boum! boum!" (see below). Four canvases were made to a one big square canvas with a side longer than 4 meters. The character the creation features stands for a "pig" as 2019 is a year of the pig in Japanese traditional calendar with twelve earthly branches.
- Exhibition "boum! boum! boum!" for 15 March – 16 June 2019 in IHI Stage Around Tokyo in Toyosu, Tokyo. Katori's first solo exhibition in Japan after the world's premiere in Paris in 2018. The event title "boum! boum! boum!" stands for a pounding heart in French. The concept of the exhibition, which is designed more like a show than an art exhibition, is "Looking inside Shingo Katori". After watching a short film on the seats of the innovative theater, in which the audience area rotates 360 degrees, the visitors are requested to step on to the stage with three separate segments where Katori's art pieces are installed. The exhibition catalogue also includes Katori's talks with noted artists, Tadanori Yoko'o and Makoto Aida.

== Filmography ==
=== Film ===
Year	Title	Role	Notes	Ref.
1994	Shoot!	Toshihiko Tanaka		
1997	Touch & Maggie	Ryoichi Shibata		
2000	Juvenile	Soichiro		
2001	Minna no Ie	Priest	Cameo appearance	
2004	Nin x Nin: Ninja Hattori-kun, the Movie	Kanzo Hattori	Lead role	
2006	The Uchōten Hotel	Kenji Tadano		
2007	The Adventures of Super Monkey	Monkey King	Lead role	
2007	Sukiyaki Western Django	Rich	Cameo appearance	
2007	Friends: Mononoke Shima no Naki	Naki (voice)		
2008	The Magic Hour	Kenji Tadano	Cameo appearance	
2010	Zatoichi: The Last	Zatoichi	Lead role	
2011	Kochi Kame The Movie	Kankichi Ryoutsu	Lead role	
2012	Love Masao-kun ga Iku	Hideki Matsumoto	Lead role	
2012	Bayside Shakedown: The Final	Tomonori Kuse		
2013	Human Trust	M		
2015	Galaxy Turnpike	Noa	Lead role	
2018	Kuso-yarō to Utsukushiki Sekai		Lead role	
2019	Sea of Revival	Ikuo Kinomoto	Lead role	
2022	Everything Will Be Owlright!	Yūjirō Tamura	Lead role	
2026	It's All Bananas!		Lead role	
2027	The High School Family	Ichiro Ietani	Lead role	

=== Japanese dub ===
Year	Title	Role	Notes	Ref.
2005	Shark Tale	Oscar		
2007	Strings	Ghrak		

=== Television (as actor) ===
Year	Title	Role	Notes
1988–1989	Abunai Shonen III	Himself	Main role
1989	Jikan desuyo Heisei Gannen		
1990	Madonna wa Harukaze ni Notte		
1992	Ude ni Oboeari	Rinnosuke Hiranuma	
1993	Onegai Demon	Shuhei Takahashi	
1994–1995	Akazukin Chacha	Riya (voice)	
1994	Samurai Spirits	Haomaru (voice)	
1995	For You	Sora Sawaki	
1995	Sasho Taeko Saigo no Jiken	Koji Taniguchi	
1995	Miseinen	Jin Murooka	
1996	Tomei Ningen	Hanzo Hasegawa	Main role
1996	Ajiichimonme		Guest appearance
1996	Doku	Doku	Main role
1997	Ichiban Taisetsu na Hito	Kohei Osawa	Main role
1997	Boku ga Boku de Arutame ni	Satoshi Ozu	Main role
1998	Yonimo Kimyou na Monogatari	Sakamoto	Main role
1998	Koi wa Aserazu	Ryo Hasebe	
1999	Furuhata Ninzaburo vs SMAP	Himself	Main role
1999	Yomigaeru Kinro	Tetsuya Asakura	Main role
2000	Aikotoba wa Yuki	Tadashi Oyama	
2000	Kochi Kame	Shingo Mama (voice)	Guest appearance
2001	Ohha wa Sekai wo Sukuu	Himself	Main role
2001	Yonimo Kimyou na Monogatari	Ichiro Tadano	Main role
2001	Love Story	Kyoji Nabetomo	
2001	Star no Koi	Iori Koda	Guest appearance; episode 11
2002	Hito ni Yasashiku	Zen Maeda	Main role
2002	Ao ni Koishite	Hidehito Imada	Main role
2002–2003	HR	Shingo Todoroki	Main role
2003	Astro Boy	Robot (voice)	Guest appearance
2004	Shinsengumi!	Isami Kondo	Main role
2004	X'smap	Otto	Main role
2006	Saiyuuki	Songoku	Main role
2007	Galileo	Shoichi Tagami	Guest appearance; episode 4
2007	Chibi Maruko-chan	Shingo / Kengo (voice)	Guest appearance
2008	Bara no nai Hanaya	Eiji Shiomi	Main role
2009	Kurobe no Taiyo	Hitoshi Kuramatsu	Main role
2009	Mr. Brain	Man in airplane	Guest appearance; episode 8
2009	Kochira Katsushika-ku Kameari Koen-mae Hashutsujo	Kankichi Ryoutsu	Main role
2010	Dokutomato Satsujin Jiken	Himself	Main role
2011	Shiawase ni Narouyo	Jyunpei Takakura	Main role
2011	Ikemen desu ne	Himself	Cameo appearance; episode 6
2012	Monsters	Heihachi Hirazuka	Main role
2013	Kasukana Kanojyo	Akatsuki Kamiyama	Main role
2013	Yonimo Kimyou na Monogatari	Naoya Yunomoto	Main role
2013	Furuhata vs SMAP The Aftermath	Himself	Main role
2014	Smoking Gun	Enishi Nagareta	Main role
2014	Oretachi ni Asu wa Aru	Himself	Main role
2014	Sazae-san	Himself (voice)	Guest appearance; episode 7148
2015	Issencho-yen no Minoshirokin	Naoto Hiraoka	Main role
2016	Kazoku no Katachi	Daisuke Nagasato	Main role
2016	Stranger	Akira Misugi	Main role
2021	Anonymous: Keishicho ”Yubisatsujin” Taisakushitsu	Wataru Banjo	Main role
2021	Isoroku Yamamoto in London	Isoroku Yamamoto	Main role; TV movie

=== Television (as personality) ===
Year	Title	Role	Notes
1994–2014	Waratte Iitomo	Himself	
1994–1995	Yo Taisho Mikke	Himself	
1996–1997	Katori Shingo's Asia no Mikata	Himself (host)	
1996–2016	SMAPxSMAP	Himself (host, chef, performer)	
1997–2008	Katori Shingo's Tensei Shingo	Himself (host)	
1998–2001	Sata Sma	Himself (host)	
1999	Shonen Zuno Katori 1999	Himself (host)	
1999–2001	Heisei Nihon no Yofuke	Himself	
2001–2017	SmaSTATION!!	Himself (host)	
2001–2017	Ura Sma	Himself (host)	
2002	Deli Sma	Himself (host)	
2002–present	Kaso Taisho	Himself (host)	TV special; 15 episodes
2003	Smao	Himself (host)	
2005	24 Hour Television	Himself (host)	Telethon
2007	27 Hour Television	Himself	Guest appearance
2007–	Baby Smap	Himself (host)	
2010	Sports Crisis	Himself (host)	TV special; 1 episode
2012–2017	OjyaMAP	Himself (host)	
2012–	MaroMaro Ishoukenmei	Himself	TV special; 3 episodes
2014–	SmaShip	Himself (host)	TV special; 2 episodes
2015–2016	NHK Nodojiman	Himself (host)	TV special; 6 episodes

=== Radio ===
Year	Title	Role	Notes
1992–	Ohayo SMAP	Himself	
1995–2016	SMAP Power Splash	Himself	
2017–present	ShinTsuyo Power Splash	Himself	

=== Theatre ===
Year	Title	Role	Notes
1991	Saint Seiya	Andoromeda Shun	Lead role
1992	Dragon Quest		Lead role
1993	Another		Lead role
1994	Kaidan Nise Sarayashiki		
2009	Talk Like Singing		Lead role
2014	Ocean's Eleven	Danny Ocean	Lead role
2015	burst!		Lead role
2018	Nihon no Rekishi		

== Discography ==
=== Albums ===
Title	Details	Charts
Title	Details	JPN
20200101	Released: January 1, 2020; Label: Warner Music Japan; Formats: CD, digital download, streaming	1
Tokyo SNG (東京SNG)	Released: April 13, 2022; Label: Warner Music Japan; Formats: CD, digital download, streaming	2

=== As Shingo Mama ===
Release date	Title	Charts	Certification
Release date	Title	JPN	Certification
18 August 2000	"Shingo Mama's Oha Rock"	1	JPN: Diamond

== Awards and nominations ==
Year	Organization	Award	Work	Result
1995	33rd Galaxy Awards	Best Supporting Actor	Sasho Taeko	Won
1995	7th The Television Academy Award	Best Supporting Actor	Miseinen	Won
1996	11th The Television Academy Award	Best Actor	Doku	Won
2000	17th Shingo Ryukogo Taisho	Word of the Year	Ohha	Won
2000	8th Hashida Sugako Award	Hashida Award	Shingo Katori and Shingo Mama	Won
2000	26th The Television Academy Award	Best Supporting Actor	Aikotoba wa Yuki	Won
2001	29th The Television Academy Award	Best Supporting Actor	Love Story	Won
2002	32nd The Television Academy Award	Best Actor	Hito ni Yasashiku	Won
2005	43rd The Television Academy Award	Best Actor	Shinsengumi	Won
2020	62nd Blue Ribbon Awards	Best Actor	Sea of Revival	Nominated

== Publications ==
- Shingo no Itazura (December 1998) ISBN 978-4847025136
- DIET SHINGO (5 September 2003) ISBN 978-4838714698
- SNAP NO SHINGO (13 October 2006) ISBN 978-4334901325
- Fuku Baka Shifukubon (31 January 2014) ISBN 978-4087807042
- Shingo Jiten SD SHINGO DICTIONARY VOLUME 1 (28 July 2015) ISBN 978-4093965323
