= Wagaya no Rekishi =

- Genre: Drama, romance-drama, family, comedy
- Written by: Kōki Mitani
- Directed by: Keita Kono
- Starring: Kou Shibasaki; Kōichi Satō; Seishiro Kato; Jun Matsumoto; Ryuta Sato; Maki Horikita
- Narrated by: Kōji Yakusho
- Theme music composer: Takayuki Hattori
- Country of origin: Japan
- Original language: Japanese
- No. of episodes: 3

Production
- Producers: Yumiko Shigeoka; Hideki Inada; Hiroko Emori
- Production location: Japan
- Production company: Fuji Television

Original release
- Network: FNS (Fuji TV)
- Release: April 9 – April 11, 2010

Wagaya no Rekishi (わが家の歴史; "The History of My Family") is a Japanese three-part television mini-series, that aired on Fuji TV from April 9, 2010 to April 11, 2010 to celebrate its 50th anniversary. The show was known for its star-studded cast.

== Synopsis ==
Masako (Kou Shibasaki) is the eldest daughter of the Yame family, living in Fukuoka, Kyushu. She leaves school to help support her good, but naive parents and four siblings. The drama centers on the family members and people they meet in the post-war Japan. The story takes place between 1945 and 1964, chronicling the lives of the seven members of the fictional Yame family.

== Cast ==
- Kou Shibasaki as Masako Yame
- Kōichi Satō as Taizo Onizuka
- Seishiro Kato as Minoru Yame
- Jun Matsumoto as Yoshio Yame
- Ryuta Sato as Muneo Yame
- Maki Horikita as Namiko Yame
- Mio Miyatake as young Namiko
- Nana Eikura as Fusako Yame
- Masami Nagasawa as Yukari Ichinose
- Yo Oizumi as Tsuru
- Tetsuji Tamayama as Ryugo Oura
- Koji Yamamoto as Mitsunari Ano
- Sawa Suzuki as Maria
- Junji Takada as Miyoji Koga
- Yūki Amami as Chiaki Onizuka
- Sumiko Fuji as Maki Yame
- Toshiyuki Nishida as Tokijiro Yame
- Kenji Anan as Manager of a host club Nagaiyoru

=== Prominent and other figures of the Showa Era ===
- Noritake Kinashi (Tunnels) as Kenichi Enomoto
- Akiyoshi Nakao as Hideo Murata
- Emi Wakui as Machiko Hasegawa
- Takuzō Kadono as Shigeru Yoshida
- Tatsuya Fujiwara as Osamu Tezuka
- Shun Oguri as Ken Takakura
- Masanobu Takashima as Hideo Itokawa
- Tomomitsu Yamaguchi as Rikidozan
- Keiko Toda as Shizuko Kasagi
- Shinji Takeda as Yoshio Shirai
- Takashi Ukaji as Akira Kurosawa
- Takayuki Yamada as Tatsuya Nakadai
- Shirō Itō as Roppa Furukawa
- Norito Yashima as Shusaku Endo
- Eiji Wentz as Akihiro Maruyama
- Saki Aibu as Misora Hibari
  - Maya Sakura as Misora Hibari (child)
- Masaaki Uchino as Kozo Masuda
- Muga Tsukaji as Kiyoshi Yamashita
- Koji Ishizaka as Kafū Nagai
- Fumiyo Kohinata as Nobusuke Kishi
- Zina Blausova as Marilyn Monroe
- Masaki Okada as Masashi Miyazaki (fictional figure)
- Susumu Terajima as Shoji Hiiragi (fictional figure)
- Kiichi Nakai as Juichi Shishimaru (fictional figure)

== Episode ratings ==
Episode	Ratings (Kanto)
1	21.2
2	18.4
3	21.1
Average	20.3
