= Monsters (Japanese TV series) =

Japanese television series

- Genre: Crime; Mystery
- Screenplay by: Mitsuharu Makita
- Directed by: Katsuo Fukuzawa; Shunichi Hirano; Yuki Osawa; Yasuharu Ishii
- Starring: Shingo Katori; Tomohisa Yamashita
- Ending theme: "Monsters" by The Monsters
- Composers: Shingo Katori; Tomohisa Yamashita
- No. of episodes: 8

Production
- Producers: Akihiko Ishimaru; Masanao Takahashi; Kenzo Abe
- Running time: 54 minutes
- Production company: Toho

Original release
- Network: Tokyo Broadcasting System Television
- Release: October 21 – December 9, 2012

Monsters is a Japanese television drama series, broadcast on TBS, starring Katori Shingo and Tomohisa Yamashita. The series aired in Autumn 2012.

== Cast ==
- Katori Shingo as Heihachi Hiratsuka
- Yamashita Tomohisa as Kosuke Saionji
- Emi Takano as Kanako Yanagihara
- Tomoya Warabino as Kanji Takakura
- Daisuke Kikuta as Hayato Kudo
- Tatsuya Hino as Junichi Fujisaki
- Tomoya Shiroishi as Shuji Hara
- Yasukage Hinaka as Koji Kitagawa
- Makoto Ohtake as Wataru Kenmochi
- Kenichi Endō as Hajime Kaneda

== Episodes ==
No.	Title	Directed by	Written by	Original release date	Ratings
1	"An unprecedented thrilling mystery is starting!! An excessively polite detective, a ○○ perpetrator!? A perfect crime lurking in a huge family business. The first culprit is you."	Katsuo Fukuzawa	Mitsuharu Makita	October 21, 2012	13.8%
2	"Instantaneous culprit"	Katsuo Fukuzawa	Mitsuharu Makita	October 28, 2012	13.4%
3	"A mystery writer's too perfect time trick"	Shunichi Hirano	Mitsuharu Makita	November 4, 2012	11.2%
4	"Murder Case of the invisible man at the university hospital"	Yuki Osawa	Mitsuharu Makita	November 11, 2012	11.5%
5	"The ultimate gourmet murder case. The last meal is an illusory taste."	Yasuharu Ishii	Mitsuharu Makita	November 18, 2012	11.0%
6	"Eccentric detective vs. genius inventor!! Is the locked room actually locked?"	Shunichi Hirano	Mitsuharu Makita	November 25, 2012	10.3%
7	"Does the culprit have a split personality?"	Katsuo Fukuzawa; Yuki Osawa	Masafumi Nishida	December 2, 2012	8.0%
8	"Farewell rough detective!! The last case is soundly defeated... The strange case that was foretold 20 years ago and the truth about Heihachi"	Katsuo Fukuzawa; Shunichi Hirano	Masafumi Nishida	December 9, 2012	13.5%

== Reception ==
A review of the series praised the comedic dimensionl of Kenichi Endo's acting performance.
