= Sanada Maru (TV series) =

2016 taiga drama about the samurai Sanada Nobushige

- Promotional poster
- Written by: Kōki Mitani
- Directed by: Takafumi Kimura and others
- Starring: Masato Sakai; Yo Oizumi; Masami Nagasawa; Yoshino Kimura; Koji Yamamoto; Hirofumi Arai; Haru Kuroki; Mayu Matsuoka; Yō Yoshida; Takeo Nakahara; Takashi Fujii; Kataoka Ainosuke VI; Shinya Niiro; Taishi Nakagawa; Kenichi Okamoto; Susumu Terajima; Masahiko Nishimura; Show Aikawa; Kenichi Endō; Masanobu Takashima; Hiroshi Fujioka; Atsuko Takahata; Mitsuko Kusabue; Yūko Takeuchi; Fumiyo Kohinata; Kyōka Suzuki; Masaomi Kondō; Seiyō Uchino; Masao Kusakari
- Narrated by: Yumiko Udo
- Theme music composer: Takayuki Hattori
- Opening theme: "Sanada Maru Main Theme" (「真田丸 メインテーマ」) by the NHK Symphony Orchestra, Fumiaki Miura
- Composer: Takayuki Hattori
- Country of origin: Japan
- Original language: Japanese
- No. of episodes: 50

Production
- Executive producers: Yotaro Yashiki; Kunio Yoshikawa
- Running time: 45 minutes

Original release
- Network: NHK
- Release: January 10 – December 18, 2016

Sanada Maru (真田丸; ; lit 'Sanada Fort') is a 2016 Japanese historical drama television series and the 55th NHK taiga drama. The series is named after the Sanada Maru, a fortification defended by Sanada during the Siege of Osaka in 1615. Written by Kōki Mitani, it stars Masato Sakai as the samurai Sanada Nobushige. It premiered on January 10, 2016 and concluded on December 18, 2016.

Due to declining viewership for taiga dramas in recent years, NHK strengthened its marketing push for Sanada Maru as compared with its previous taiga dramas.

== Plot ==
The drama focuses on the history of the Sanada clan during the Sengoku period in Japan, and in particular on Sanada Nobushige, who would go on to become one of the legendary commanders of the period.

== Cast ==
=== Sanada clan ===
- Masato Sakai as Sanada Nobushige, also known as Sanada Yukimura
- Yo Oizumi as Sanada Nobuyuki, Nobushige's older brother
- Masao Kusakari as Sanada Masayuki, Nobushige's father
- Masami Nagasawa as Kiri, Nobushige's childhood friend and confidante
- Yoshino Kimura as Matsu, Nobushige's older sister
- Atsuko Takahata as Kaoru, Nobushige's mother
- Mitsuko Kusabue as Tori, Nobushige's grandmother
- Susumu Terajima as Ideura Masasuke, a ninja in the service of Masayuki
- Takashi Fujii as Sasuke, a ninja in the service of Nobushige
- Takeo Nakahara as Takanashi Naiki, Kiri's father
- Takahiro Fujimoto as Hotta Sakubei
- Haru Kuroki as Ume, Nobushige's first wife
- Yuri Tsunematsu as Sue (teen), Nobushige and Ume's daughter
- Seishuu Uragami as Sanada Daisuke, Nobushige and Haru's son
- Nanako Ōde as Ume, Nobushige and Haru's daughter
- Yukino Kishii as Taka, Nobushige's third wife
- Takaya Sakoda as Yazawa "Sanjūrō" Yoriyuki
- Wataru Takagi as Oyamada Shigemasa, Matsu's husband
- Satomi Nagano as Kō, Nobuyuki's first wife
- Hideo Kurihara as Sanada Nobutada, younger brother of Masayuki
- Toshiki Ayata as Yazawa Yoritsuna
- Hiroki Konno as Yohachi
- Yasuhiro Ōno as Kawara Tsunaie
- Masashi Ōyama as Sanada Nobumasa
- Ryōhei Hirota as Sanada Nobuyoshi
- Akiko Yagi as Ono Otsū
- Ryō Katō as Ishiai Jūzō, Sue's husband
- Hanamaru Hakata as Saizō
- Kunihiro Matsumura as Seikai Nyūdō
- Tomohiro Waki as Isa Nyūdō
- Yoshiaki Umegaki as Kamanosuke
- Taku Suzuki as Jūzō
- Hideto Iwai as Jinpachi
- Yūma Yamoto as Rokurō

=== Tokugawa clan ===
- Seiyō Uchino as Tokugawa Ieyasu, Nobushige's the most powerful nemesis
- Masaomi Kondō as Honda Masanobu, a strategist for Ieyasu
- Gen Hoshino as Tokugawa Hidetada
- Seiko Niizuma as Ogō, Hidetada's wife
- Yuki Saito as Lady Acha
- Hiroshi Fujioka as Honda Tadakatsu, Nobuyuki's father-in-law
- Yō Yoshida as Inahime, also known as Komatsuhime, Tadakatsu's daughter, Nobuyuki's wife & Nobushige's sister in-law
- Masayuki Itō as Ishikawa Kazumasa
- Kenji Hamatani as Hattori Hanzō
- Kōichi Ōhori as Torii Mototada
- Takaaki Itō as Honda Masazumi

Pro-Tokugawa daimyōs

- Takuya Ōga as Kuroda Nagamasa
- Macchu Saitō as Asano Yoshinaga
- Isao Sano as Hachisuka Iemasa
- Seiji Hino as Tōdō Takatora

=== Toyotomi clan ===
- Fumiyo Kohinata as Toyotomi Hideyoshi
- Kyōka Suzuki as Nei, Hideyoshi's wife
- Yūko Takeuchi as Yodo-dono, Hideyoshi's concubine
- Taishi Nakagawa as Toyotomi Hideyori, Hideyoshi's son
  - Sera Ishida as young Hideyori
- Mei Nagano as Senhime, Hideyori's wife
- Koji Yamamoto as Ishida Mitsunari, the commander of the Western army in the Battle of Sekigahara
- Kataoka Ainosuke VI as Ōtani Yoshitsugu, Mitsunari's ally, Nobushige's father-in-law
- Mayu Matsuoka as Haru, also known as Chikurin-in, Yoshitsugu's daughter, Nobushige's wife
- Takamasa Tamaki as Shima Sakon
- Katsura Bunshi VI as Sen no Rikyū
- Takashi Kobayashi as Katagiri Katsumoto, negotiator with the Tokugawa shogunate
- Shinya Niiro as Toyotomi Hidetsugu
- Hirofumi Arai as Katō Kiyomasa, loyal vassal to the Toyotomi clan
- Motoki Fukami as Fukushima Masanori
- Yōsuke Asari as Kobayakawa Hideaki
  - Kento Saitō as young Hideaki
- Rie Minemura as Lady Ōkura-kyō
- Yoshimasa Kondo as Hirano Nagayasu
- Tomohiko Imai as Ōno Harunaga
- Masa Yamada as Naka, Hideyoshi's mother
- Tetsuya Chiba as Toyotomi Hidenaga
- Michiko Shimizu as Asahi-hime
- Nahoko Yoshimoto as Uta, Mitsunari's wife
- Arisa Nakajima as Yoshino Tayū
- Kazuya Takahashi as Ukita Hideie
- Mitsuki Horikoshi as Toyotomi Hidekatsu
- Ryō Mitsuya as Toyotomi Hideyasu
- Hirara Hayasaka as Toyotomi Tsurumatsu
- Masayuki Kizu as Natsuka Masaie
- Shinya Kote as Ban Naoyuki, aka Ban Dan'emon
- Jun Inoue as Oda Urakusai
- Voice Yoshida as Tachibana Gonza
- Shoko Haida as Ohatsu, Yodo's sister
- Ben Hiura as Ōsumi Yozaemon

"The Seven Generals of Hideyori"

- Kenji Anan as Chōsokabe Morichika
- Kenichi Okamoto as Mōri Katsunaga
- Show Aikawa as Gotō Matabei
- Kensaku Kobayashi as Akashi Teruzumi
- Shunya Shiraishi as Kimura Shigenari
- Kozo Takeda as Ōno Harufusa
- and Sanada Yukimura

=== Uesugi clan ===
- Kenichi Endō as Uesugi Kagekatsu
- Shingo Murakami as Naoe Kanetsugu, Kagekatsu’s right‐hand man
- Yasuyuki Maekawa as Kasuga Nobutatsu

=== Later Hōjō clan ===
- Masanobu Takashima as Hōjō Ujimasa
- Yoshihiko Hosoda as Hōjō Ujinao
- Atsushi Yamanishi as Itabeoka Kōsetsusai

=== Shinano Province ===
- Masahiko Nishimura as Muroga Masatake
- Kenichi Ishii as Kiso Yoshimasa

=== Takeda clan ===
- Takehiro Hira as Takeda Katsuyori
- Takaaki Enoki as Anayama Baisetsu
- Kunishirō Hayashi as Takeda Shingen (Ghost)
- Yōichi Nukumizu as Oyamada Nobushige
- Takuo Inari as Atobe Katsusuke
- Kōji Hatta as Oyamada Hachizaemon

=== Oda clan ===
- Kōtarō Yoshida as Oda Nobunaga
- Yasunori Danta as Takigawa Kazumasu
- Reo Tamaoki as Oda Nobutada
- Hisafumi Iwashita as Akechi Mitsuhide
- Kenji Matsuda as Nagasaki Motoie
- Tanida Ayumi as Mori Nagayoshi

=== Date clan ===
- Tomoharu Hasegawa as Date Masamune
- Asahi Yoshida as Katakura Kagetsuna

=== Maeda clan ===
- Katsuya Kobayashi as Maeda Toshiie, a member of the council of Five Elders
- Masayuki Yorozu as Maeda Toshinaga

=== Mōri clan ===
- Naoki Asaji as Mōri Terumoto, a member of the council of Five Elders

=== Hosokawa clan ===
- Toshihiro Yashiba as Hosokawa Tadaoki
- Manami Hashimoto as Hosokawa Gracia

=== Others ===
- Matsumoto Kōshirō IX as Luzon Sukezaemon (from 1978 taiga drama Ōgon no Hibi)
- Sylvia Grab as Izumo no Okuni
- Kenji Mizuhashi as Kichizō
- Jun Uemoto as Seikan
- Ryō Kinomoto as Chōbei
- Makoto Miyashita as Takemoto Gidayū
- Makoto Tsuchiya
- Kazuya Kojima as Muroga Kyūdayū, the son of Muroga Masatake

== Production ==
Production Credits

- Music – Takayuki Hattori
- Titling – Shūhei Hasado
- Historical research – Motoki Kuroda, Masaru Hirayama, Kazuhiro Marushima
- Architectural research – Kiyoshi Hirai
- Clothing research – Hiroaki Koizumi
- Sword fight arranger - Kunishirō Nakagawa

=== Casting ===
NHK chose to cast Masato Sakai for the lead role of Sanada Nobushige, a samurai of the Sengoku period. Minoru Kubota of the Yomiuri Shimbun assumes that this is in part to increase viewership for the historical series after years of declining audience numbers for taiga dramas, as Sakai was a popular actor in the dramas he previously starred in.

== Marketing ==
Due to the decline in viewers of NHK's taiga dramas, which is especially seen in the historically low ratings of preceding taiga drama Hana Moyu in 2015, the public broadcaster strengthened its effort to market Sanada Maru in order for viewership to increase. Locations that were to be depicted in the taiga drama were featured in travel-themed programs such as Tsurube's Salute to Families and Bura Tamori, which also featured actors from Sanada Maru as guests. History-themed documentaries and discussion programs covered the historical background of the drama. Lead actor Sakai was sent out by NHK to major media outlets for interviews, though he was found to be uncooperative in many of them, as questions would focus on his personal life instead of his new role in the drama.

== TV schedule ==
Episode	Title	Directed by	Original airdate	Rating
1	"Funade" (船出, Sailing Out)	Takafumi Kimura	January 10, 2016	19.9%
2	"Ketsudan" (決断, Decision)	Takafumi Kimura	January 17, 2016	20.1%
3	"Sakuryaku" (策略, Stratagem)	Takafumi Kimura	January 24, 2016	18.3%
4	"Chōsen" (挑戦, Challenge)	Kunio Yoshikawa	January 31, 2016	17.8%
5	"Kyūchi" (窮地, Predicament)	Takafumi Kimura	February 7, 2016	19.0%
6	"Meisō" (迷走, Adrift)	Takafumi Kimura	February 14, 2016	16.9%
7	"Dakkai" (奪回, Recapture)	Tadashi Tanaka	February 21, 2016	17.4%
8	"Chōryaku" (調略, Ploy)	Tadashi Tanaka	February 28, 2016	17.1%
9	"Kakehiki" (駆引, Maneuvering)	Daiji Kobayashi	March 6, 2016	16.6%
10	"Myōshu" (妙手, Gambit)	Daiji Kobayashi	March 13, 2016	16.2%
11	"Shūgen" (祝言, Nuptials)	Tadashi Tanaka	March 20, 2016	15.6%
12	"Hitojichi" (人質, Hostage)	Tadashi Tanaka	March 27, 2016	17.9%
13	"Kessen" (決戦, Showdown)	Takafumi Kimura	April 3, 2016	17.5%
14	"Osaka" (大坂)	Takafumi Kimura	April 10, 2016	17.1%
15	"Hideyoshi" (秀吉)	Takafumi Kimura	April 17, 2016	18.3%
16	"Hyōri" (表裏, Two-faced)	Daiji Kobayashi	April 24, 2016	16.9%
17	"Saikai" (再会, Reunion)	Shōhei Doi	May 1, 2016	17.0%
18	"Jōraku" (上洛, An audience)	Tadashi Tanaka	May 8, 2016	19.1%
19	"Koiji" (恋路, Romance)	Daiji Kobayashi	May 15, 2016	17.0%
20	"Zenchō" (前兆, Premonition)	Tetsuya Watanabe	May 22, 2016	18.7%
21	"Sentan" (戦端, Hostility)	Takafumi Kimura	May 29, 2016	16.8%
22	"Saitei" (裁定, Arbitration)	Shōhei Doi	June 5, 2016	16.6%
23	"Kōryaku" (攻略, Conquest)	Tadashi Tanaka	June 12, 2016	18.9%
24	"Metsubō" (滅亡, Downfall)	Takafumi Kimura	June 19, 2016	17.6%
25	"Betsuri" (別離, Parting)	Tetsuya Watanabe	June 26, 2016	18.3%
26	"Uriuri" (瓜売, Gourd Seller)	Daiji Kobayashi	July 3, 2016	16.4%
27	"Fushin" (不信, Distrust)	Takafumi Kimura	July 10, 2016	15.1%
28	"Junan" (受難, Sufferings)	Shōhei Doi	July 17, 2016	17.0%
29	"Ihen" (異変, Disturbance)	Keita Hosaka	July 24, 2016	17.5%
30	"Tasogare" (黄昏, Twilight)	Tadashi Tanaka	July 31, 2016	14.5%
31	"Shūen" (終焉, Demise)	Takafumi Kimura	August 7, 2016	17.3%
32	"Ōshū" (応酬, Tit-for-tat)	Daiji Kobayashi	August 14, 2016	15.8%
33	"Dōran" (動乱, Upheaval)	Shōhei Doi	August 21, 2016	18.0%
34	"Kyohei" (挙兵, Risings)	Tetsuya Watanabe	August 28, 2016	13.2%
35	"Inubushi" (犬伏)	Takafumi Kimura	September 4, 2016	15.0%
36	"Shōbu" (勝負, Battle)	Daiji Kobayashi	September 11, 2016	16.5%
37	"Nobuyuki" (信之)	Tadashi Tanaka	September 18, 2016	17.3%
38	"Masayuki" (昌幸)	Takafumi Kimura	September 25, 2016	15.7%
39	"Saigetsu" (歳月, Years)	Keita Hosaka	October 2, 2016	16.6%
40	"Yukimura" (幸村)	Shōhei Doi	October 9, 2016	15.0%
41	"Nyūjō" (入城, Entry)	Takafumi Kimura	October 16, 2016	15.4%
42	"Mikata" (味方, Allies)	Takafumi Kimura	October 23, 2016	13.0%
43	"Gungi" (軍議, War Council)	Daiji Kobayashi	October 30, 2016	14.5%
44	"Chikujō" (築城, Fortification)	Tadashi Tanaka	November 6, 2016	15.3%
45	"Kanpū" (完封, Shutout)	Tadashi Tanaka	November 13, 2016	15.2%
46	Hōdan (砲弾, Cannonball)	Keita Hosaka	November 20, 2016	14.2%
47	Hangeki (反撃, Counter-attack)	Daiji Kobayashi	November 27, 2016	15.3%
48	Hikigane (引鉄, Trigger)	Takuya Shimizu	December 4, 2016	16.1%
49	"Zen'ya" (前夜, The Eve)	Takafumi Kimura	December 11, 2016	14.8%
50	None	Takafumi Kimura	December 18, 2016	14.7%
Average rating 16.6% - Rating is based on Japanese Video Research (Kantō region).

== Soundtracks ==
- Sanada Maru NHK Taiga Drama Original Soundtrack (February 24, 2016)
- Sanada Maru NHK Taiga Drama Original Soundtrack II (July 20, 2016)
- Sanada Maru NHK Taiga Drama Original Soundtrack III (November 9, 2016)
- Sanada Maru NHK Taiga Drama Original Soundtrack: The Best (December 21, 2016)

== Accolades ==
Ceremony	Category	Nominees	Result	Ref.
10th Tokyo Drama Awards	Best Drama Series	Sanada Maru	Nominated	
10th Tokyo Drama Awards	Best Actor	Masato Sakai	Won	
10th Tokyo Drama Awards	Best Supporting Actor	Masao Kusakari	Won	

== See also ==
- Sanada Maru (fortification)
- Sengoku period
- Sanada Taiheiki
