= Sōri to Yobanaide =

- Genre: Drama Comedy
- Written by: Kōki Mitani
- Directed by: Keita Kono; Masayuki Suzuki
- Starring: Masakazu Tamura; Honami Suzuki; Masahiko Nishimura
- Theme music composer: Takayuki Hattori
- Country of origin: Japan
- Original language: Japanese
- No. of episodes: 11

Production
- Producer: Sizuo Sekiguchi
- Running time: 54 minutes
- Production company: Fuji Television

Original release
- Network: Fuji Television
- Release: April 8 – June 17, 1997

Sōri to Yobanaide (総理と呼ばないで) is a Japanese political and comedy drama series that first aired on FUJI TV in 1997. It stars Masakazu Tamura. The drama is set in a fictional country. It was written by Japanese playwright Kōki Mitani. Mitani directed similar political and comedy film Hit me Anyone One More Time in 2019.

== Plot ==
The new Prime Minister is incompetent and self-centered, and very unpopular with the people. He is on the verge of resigning. The Prime Minister and his staff struggle not to be the shortest cabinet in history at all costs.

== Cast ==
- Masakazu Tamura : Prime Minister
- Masahiko Nishimura : Chief Administrative Officer and Secretary
- Honami Suzuki : Mrs. Prime Minister
- Michitaka Tstutsui : Chief Cabinet Secretary
- Masao Komatsu : Servant
- Kōji Nakamoto : Deputy Secretary-General of the Cabinet Secretariat
- Aiko Satō; Daughter of Prime Minister
- Keiko Toda : Secretary
- Hozumi Gōda : Secretary
- Morio Kazama : Mrs. Prime Minister's secret lover
- Masanari Nihei : SP
- Katsuya Kobayashi : Chief of Staff
- Katsuhiko Sasaki : Chairman of Diet Affairs Committee
- Shunji Fujimura : Deputy Prime Minister
- Mayu Tsuruta : Maid
