= Kenji Anan =

Japanese stage and film actor

Kenji Anan (阿南 健治, Anan Kenji; born on February 24, 1962, in Taketa, Ōita, Japan) is a Japanese stage and film actor.

He began work with the Tokyo Sunshine Boys in 1983, and since then has performed in a variety of roles mostly in television dramas.

== Filmography ==
=== Film ===
- The Uchōten Hotel (2006)
- The Magic Hour (2008)
- The Kiyosu Conference (2013), Takigawa Kazumasu
- Galaxy Turnpike (2015), Captain Tchiyama
- Fukushima 50 (2020)
- Arrogance and Virtue (2024), Masaharu Sakaniwa
- All About Suomi (2024)
- Miharu ni Kasa o (2025)
- Kyoto Hippocrates (2026)

=== Television ===
- Gokusen (2002–2008), Kozo Wakamatsu
- Gal Circle (2006), George
- Wagaya no Rekishi (2010), Manager of Nagayouru
- Sanada Maru (2016), Chōsokabe Morichika
- The 13 Lords of the Shogun (2022), Doi Sanehira
