= Yō Yoshida =

Japanese actress

Yoh Yoshida
- 吉田 羊
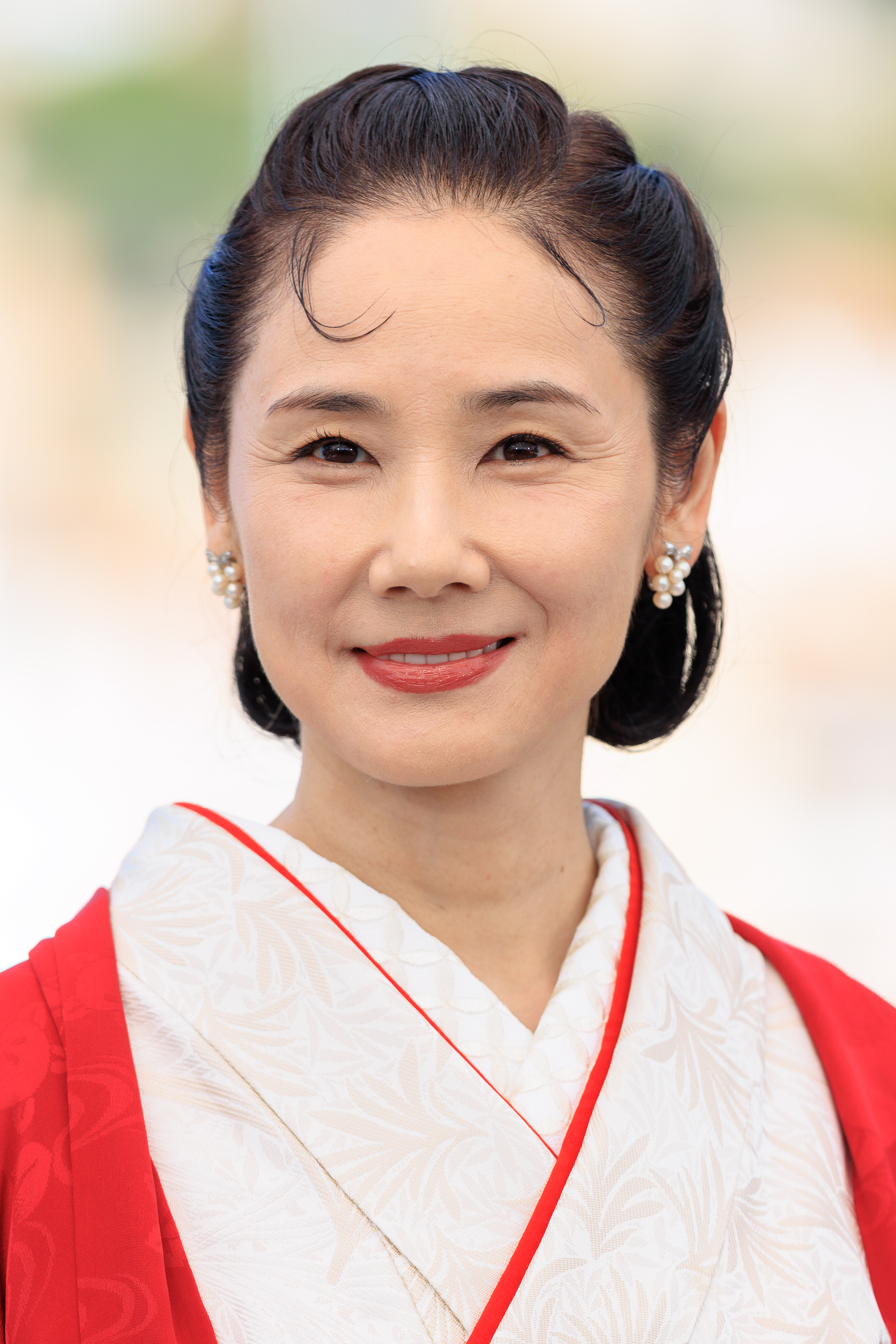
- At the 2025 Cannes Film Festival.
- Born: 吉田 羊右子 (Yoshida Yoko); February 3 Kurume, Fukuoka, Japan
- Occupation: Actress
- Years active: 1997–present

Yoh Yoshida (吉田 羊, Yoshida Yoh; born February 3 in Kurume, Fukuoka) is a Japanese actress who is represented by the talent agency Oranku.

== Biography ==
Yoh Yoshida does not reveal her date of birth because she wants to be chosen for roles without her age being important.

== Filmography ==
=== TV series ===
Year	Title	Role	Other notes	Ref.
2012	Jun and Ai	Fujiko Kirino	Asadora	
2014	Hero	Reiko Baba	Season 2	
2015	Anohana: The Flower We Saw That Day	Yoko Honma	TV movie	
2015–2017	Dr. Storks	Rumiko Komatsu	2 seasons	
2016	Sanada Maru	Komatsuhime	Taiga drama	
2016	Naomi and Kanako	Yoko Hattori		
2016–2021	Cold Case	Yuri Ishikawa	Lead role; 3 seasons	
2018	Meet Me After School	Ritsu Haraguchi		
2019	Nagi's Long Vacation	Misuzu Shiraishi		
2020	Mothers in Love	Yūko Hayashi		
2022	Kamen Rider Black Sun	Bishium		
2023	The Last Man: The Blind Profiler	Madoka Sakura		
2024	Extremely Inappropriate!	Sakae Sakisaka		
2024	Dear Radiance	Fujiwara no Akiko	Taiga drama	
2026	Extremely Inappropriate! Special	Sakae Sakisaka	Television film	
2026	Did Someone Happen to Mention Me?	Yoko Nonomura		

=== Films ===
Year	Title	Role	Other notes	Ref.
2011	Bunny Drop	Haruko Sasaki		
2015	Flying Colors	Akari Kudo (Sayaka's Mother)		
2015	Poison Berry in My Brain	Ikeda		
2015	The Pearls of the Stone Man	Michiko Ueda		
2016	Desperate Sunflowers	Tetsuko Ishida	Lead role	
2018	Hanalei Bay	Sachi	Lead role	
2018	After the Rain	Tomoyo Tachibana		
2018	No Matter How Much My Mom Hates Me	Mitsuko	Lead role	
2018	Cafe Funiculi Funicula	Yaeko Hirai		
2018	Love × Doc	Asuka	Lead role	
2019	Hit Me Anyone One More Time	Akane Yamanishi		
2022	My Broken Mariko	Kyoko Tamura		
2022	Silent Parade	Maya Miyazawa		
2023	In Love and Deep Water	Hatsumi Yabuchi		
2023	Ichikei's Crow: The Movie	Etsuko Kobayakawa		
2023	Winny			
2024	Happiness	Riyo Yamagishi		
2025	A Pale View of Hills	Etsuko (30 years later)	British-Japanese film	
2025	The Last Man: The Movie – First Love	Madoka Sakura		
2026	Satoko Always	Chiho Terao		
2026	Guilt	Ayako Shiraishi		
2026	Ha-Chan, Shake Your Booty!	Yuki	American film	
2026	Children Untold			
2026	The Moon Is Watching	Eva		
2026	The Day After Sunday			
2026	Silver Express			

=== Dubbing ===
- Legend of the Demon Cat, Lady Yang (Sandrine Pinna)
- Frozen II, Queen Iduna (Evan Rachel Wood)
- Paddington in Peru, Clarissa Cabot / The Reverend Mother (Olivia Colman)

== Awards and nominations ==
Year	Award ceremony	Category	Result	Ref.
2015	8th Tokyo Drama Awards	Best Supporting Actress	Won	
2015	40th Hochi Film Award	Best Supporting Actress	Won	
2016	58th Blue Ribbon Awards	Best Supporting Actress	Won	
2016	40th Elan d'or Awards	Newcomers of the Year	Won	
2016	39th Japan Academy Film Prize	Best Supporting Actress	Nominated	
