= Vamp Show =

Vamp Show is a play performed in Japan in 2001 in the PARCO Theatre in Shibuya, Tokyo. It was directed by Ikeda Narushi. It was written by Mitani Kōki and inspired by the German musical Tanz der Vampire. The only similarity in the two stories, however, is the topic of vampires.

== History ==
After its 2001 production, it had a second run at PARCO in 2022.

== Synopsis ==
A young lady arrives at a creepy train station to wait for a train to the city. Eventually five young men arrive to wait with her. It is revealed that they are vampires, and decide that if the young lady is to be allowed to live, she must also become a vampire as well. However, one of the five young men is only pretending to be a vampire, and tries to save her from her fate.

== Original cast ==
- Sakai Masato
- Saksaki Kuranosuke
- Hashimoto Jun
- Ito Toshihito
- Kawahara Masahiko
- Matsuo Reiko
- Tezuka Toru
