= Takahiro Fujimoto =

Japanese swimmer (born 1970)

Personal information
- Full name: Takahiro Fujimoto
- Nationality: Japanese
- Born: July 21, 1970 (age 55) Kitakyushu, Japan
- Height: 1.83 m (6 ft 0 in)
- Weight: 76 kg (168 lb)

Sport
- Sport: Swimming
- Strokes: Medley
Medal record
Men's swimming
Representing Japan
Asian Games
Gold medal – first place	1990 Beijing	200 m medley
Gold medal – first place	1990 Beijing	400 m medley
Silver medal – second place	1994 Hiroshima	200 m medley
Summer Universiade
Gold medal – first place	1991 Sheffield	400 m medley
Bronze medal – third place	1991 Sheffield	200 m medley

Takahiro Fujimoto (藤本 隆宏, Fujimoto Takahiro; born July 21, 1970 in Fukuoka) is an actor and a retired male medley swimmer from Japan, who represented his native country in two consecutive Summer Olympics, starting in 1988. His best Olympic result was the 8th place (4:23.86) in the Men's 400m Individual Medley event at the 1992 Summer Olympics.

Fujimoto started his career as an actor in 1997.

== Filmography ==
=== Film ===
- Yamato (2005)
- Neet Neet Neet (2018), Goji-san
- Hit Me Anyone One More Time (2019), Koga
- Rurouni Kenshin: The Beginning (2021), Kondō Isami
- Sisam (2024)
- Yukikaze (2025), Iwao Arima
- Disease of Family (2026)
- Never Guilty (2026), Keiju Nakajima

=== Television ===
- Clouds Over the Hill (2009–10), Takeo Hirose
- Jin (2011), Saigō Takamori
- Taira no Kiyomori (2012), Itō Tadakiyo
- Hanako and Anne (2014), Soichiro Kajiyama
- Sanada Maru (2016), Hotta Sakubei
- Segodon (2018), Yamaoka Tesshū
- Golden Kamuy: The Hunt of Prisoners in Hokkaido (2024), Tetsuzō Nihei
- Who Saw the Peacock Dance in the Jungle? (2025), Tadashi Akazawa
