= The Three Musketeers (2009 TV series) =

- Genre: Puppetry
- Based on: The Three Musketeers by Alexandre Dumas
- Written by: Kōki Mitani
- Directed by: Studio Nova
- Voices of: Sosuke Ikematsu; Koichi Yamadera; Wataru Takagi; Masashi Ebara
- Narrated by: Yuji Tanaka
- Theme music composer: Ken Hirai
- Ending theme: "一人じゃない" ("Hitori ja nai", You are not alone)
- Composer: Spanish Connection
- Country of origin: Japan
- Original language: Japanese
- No. of episodes: 40

Production
- Executive producer: Nobuhisa Kihira
- Running time: 20 min.

Original release
- Network: NHK Educational TV; NHK General TV
- Release: 12 October 2009 – 28 May 2010

The Three Musketeers (連続人形活劇 新・三銃士, Renzoku Ningyo Katsugeki Shin Sanjushi) is a Japanese puppet television show produced by NHK and broadcast by NHK Educational TV from 12 October 2009 to 28 May 2010. The show is written by Kōki Mitani and the puppets are designed by Bunta Inoue.

== Story ==
In 1625, d'Artagnan heads for Paris from Gascony and tries to meet the Three Musketeers there. From this, he grows up into a musketeer despite being involved in a struggle of power between Anne of Austria and Cardinal Richelieu.

But the dissolution of the Guards by Richelieu makes the lives of the musketeers change a lot. D' Artagnan meets former captain Treville who is a groom for king and then searches Athos, Porthos and Aramis with labour. Then Trėville tells the musketeers that d'Artagnan is a son of Bertand who taught them fencing and train him to a full-fledged musketeer. He also tells d'Artagnan to learn courage from Athos, wisdom from Aramis and humour from Porthos.

One day Bonacieux, owner of the house the musketeers and d'Atragnan live in asks them to search his young wife Constance who serves Anne of Austria. At that time, Constance is imprisoned and questioned by Cardinal Richelieu about the Duke of Buckingham, who is said to visit Paris incognito. After that, Constance runs away from prison and make the queen meet the Duke of Buckingham secretly. Anne hands him her necklace with twelve diamonds as a memory of their tryst.

However, Milady de Winter, a spy for Richelieu who serves Anne under the false name of Charlotte schemes the queen to wear a necklace at a ball to be held one week later. Then the musketeers, d'Artagnan and Constance hurry to London to take back it despite being chased by Milady and Rochefort. Finally only d'Artagnan and Constance reach the residence of the Duke of Buckingham safely but find that two of twelve diamonds are stolen by Milady, and O'Reilly, a jeweller adds two diamonds anew. Though they lose it on their way to Paris, the necklace is sent to Anne miraculously.

After the ball, d'Artagnan becomes a musketeer for the achievement. At the same time, Milady tries to revenge the musketeers and seduces Bonacieux to kidnap his wife Constance but Aramis saves her and she is sheltered in a convent. On the other hand, d'Artagnan is worried about the request of leading the Guards of Richelieu and his isolation from the three musketeers for he never hears of the kidnaping of Constance and what Aramis does for her. Finally he accepts the cardinal's offer.

Both the Guards of Louis XIII and that of Richelieu march to La Rochelle but are forced into a hard fight against the Protestant rebels supported by the Duke of Buckingham and d'Artangan and his soldiers are commanded to spearhead. It is schemed by Richelieu to kill the king's musketeers at an early stage though he survives the war while the three musketeers leaves the battlefield. And Milady goes to England to assassinate the Duke of Buckingham who is killed by a scorpion at last.

After the war, Trėville is killed by Rochefort after a duel and tells Constance and d'Artagnan that he is a son of Rochefort in reality before his death. Milady is arrested for killing the Duke of Buckingham and about to be executed but saved by the musketeers. She then runs away breaking the promise of living with Athos. It makes Athos disappointed but he is encouraged by d'Artagnan, who is appointed as a new captain of the Guards. Porthos, who becomes shell shock at La Rochelle gets back his health by Madame Coquenard's dedicated care and marries her. And Aramis returns to their house from monastery in which he shuts himself.

One evening, the three musketeers are in their favourite tavern and find a boy who resembles young d'Artagnan imitates fencing. He tells them that he would like to become a musketeer and serve king so they teach him how to fence uttering "attack, attack, and parry!"

== Characters ==
=== Musketeers ===
D'Argtagnan (voiced by Sosuke Ikematsu)
Young man from Gascony who tries to avenge the murder of his father and joins the Musketeers of the Guard though his real father is Rochefort.
Athos (voiced by Koichi Yamadera)
Hot-blooded and brave musketeer but has thirsty soul. He takes a fatherly interest in d'Artangan and encourages him.
Porthos (voiced by Wataru Takagi)
Cheerful and fat musketeer who is popular among women and consoles d'Argtagnan when he gets depressed because of his inexperience.
Aramis (voiced by Masashi Ebara)
Tall, good-looking musketeer with intelligence and calmness and gives d'Artagnan a good advice when he wavers in his judgment. He is deeply religious also.
Trėville (voiced by Masashi Ebara)
Captain of the Musketeers and one of old friends of Bertrand.
Bertrand (voiced by Toshiyuki Nishida)
Father of d'Argtagnan who is killed by Rochefort. He leaves a will to his son before his death.
Planchet (voiced by Koichi Yamadera)
A monkey who escaped from street performers and goes along with d'Artagnan. He often helps the musketeers by his quickness and cleverness.

=== Richelieu and his followers ===
Cardinal Richelieu (voiced by Masashi Ebara)
Cardinal and prime minister of France. He controls the country ignoring Louis XIII and is opposed to Anne of Austria.
Rochefort (voiced by Koichi Yamadera)
Right-hand man of Richelieu who is cruel and kills Bertrand before joining the Musketeers of the Guard again.
Milady de Winter (voiced by Keiko Toda)
Spy for Richelieu and serves Anne under the false name of Charlotte to deceive her. She once had a close and unknown relationship with Athos.
Ketty (voiced by Keiko Toda)
A cat kept as a pet by Milady who assists her mistress and competes with Planchet.

=== Royal Family ===
Louis XIII (voiced by Koichi Yamadera)
King of France. A weak-hearted and lonely young man who escapes from reality. He closes his mind to everyone but d'Artagnan who is close to him in age.
Anne of Austria (voiced by Catherine Seto)
Queen consort of Louis XIII who is opposed to Richelieu. She meets her former lover Duke of Buckingham secretly but it causes trouble. She plans to reestablish the Musketeers of the Guards dissolved by Richelieu forcibly to recover the sovereignty of her husband.

=== Others ===
Duke of Buckingham (voiced by Wataru Takagi)
Politician and aristocrat of England who loves Anne and supports the Protestant rebel. Later he is assassinated but revived by O'Reilly.
Constance (voiced by Shihori Kanjiya)
Waiting-maid of Anne and wife of Bonacieux who is loved by d'Artagngan and Aramis. She sometimes cooperates with the musketeers to save Anne when she gets into a scrape.
Bonacieux (voiced by Wataru Takagi)
Husband of Constance and owner of the house in which the musketeers live and informs Richelieu how they behave. He is a man who tries to please everyone and is sly and vulgar but sometimes behaves superhumanly because of his deep love to Constance. He is commended as an honorary citizen of Paris for his crossing the Channel using washtub.
Patrick (voiced by Koichi Yamadera)
Follower of Duke of Buckingham.
Madame Coquenard (voiced by Catherine Seto)
Fiancėe of Porthos who does housework for the musketeers. She also nurses Porthos who becomes ill during the Siege of La Rochelle and later becomes his wife.
Bassonpierre (voiced by Yuji Tanaka)
Leader of the Protestant rebels who is supported by Duke of Buckingham.
Lumiėre (voiced by Hikaru Ota)
Cheesemaker who is forced to become a soldier of a rebel army and falls in battle.
O'Reilly (voiced by Koki Mitani)
Skilful jeweller who is employed by Duke of Buckingham.

- Koichi Yamadera, Wataru Takagi and Masashi Ebara voice Sherlock Holmes, John H. Watson and Jim Moriarty in Mitani's another show "Sherlock Holmes".

== Production ==
Mitani was impressed by a puppetry "Shin Hakkenden" (新八犬伝) adapted from Nanso Satomi Hakkenden that was broadcast by NHK in his childhood and longed to produce puppetry. At that time, he played with many soldier figures but let them play family framas for he didn't like war stories. According to Mitani, he was "exactly like a hero of 'Toy Story'". The experience helped him write the script of this show. After that, he wrote a bunraku play in 2012. Before writing the script of "The Three Musketeers", he discussed appearance of the puppets with Bunta Inoue and was concerned in selecting the voice actors/actresses also.

The puppets are made of resin but put grain of wood to give warmth. Their costumes are handmade and devised to give the atmosphere of Europe in the 17th century as well as the set construction. All characters are voiced by seven voice actors/actresses. Koichi Yamadera voices six characters as Athos, Louis XIII, Rochefort, Patrick, Duke of Orléan and Planchet.

There are some jokes in the show as the Duke of Buckingham jogs wearing a jogging suit daily and the dishes with the words "Fin." (End) and "Rappel" (Curtain Call) are on a table of at the end of the final episode. In addition, Bonacieux crosses the Channel using washtub as a boat while Milady cooks unappetising stew for d'Artagnan whom she falls in love with. In addition, the puppets of O'Reilly and Bassonpierre are made after Koki Mitani and narrator Yuji Tanaka.

Various properties appear in the show. Not only swords, guns, armour and the queen's necklace but also food, books and handkerchieves Porthos is given by many women are included.

Spanish Connection is in charge of music. And the ending theme "Hitori ja nai" (You are not alone) expresses the bonds of friendship, especially that of d'Artagnan and the musketeers and the words are written by Mitani.

== Episodes ==
Episodes	Air date (ETV)	Air date (GTV)	Titles
1	12 October 2009	4 April 2010	"Tabidachi no asa" (旅立ちの朝 Departure to Paris)
2	13 October	11 April	"Chichi no yuigon"(父の遺言 Bertrand's Words)
3	14 October	18 April	"Densetsu no jushitachi"(伝説の銃士たち The Legendary Musketeers)
4	15 October	25 April	"Saikai no yoru" (再会の夜 D'artagnan meets Rochefort again)
5	16 October	2 May	"Unmei no deai" (運命の出会い A Fateful Encounter)
6	19 October	9 May	"Jushi no okite" (銃士の掟（おきて）Rule of Musketeers)
7	20 October	16 May	"Himeru omoi"(秘める思い A Hidden Love)
8	21 October	23 May	"Mangetsu no mori" (満月の森 A forest that the full moon shines)
9	22 October	30 May	"Konsutansu no himitsu" (コンスタンスの秘密The Secret of Constance)
10	23 October	6 June	"Ohi no koi" (王妃の恋 The Queen's Love)
11	30 October	13 June	"Koi no otoshiana" (恋の落とし穴 The Queen Caught in a Trap)
12	6 November	20 June	"Ohi no tegami" (王妃の手紙 The Queen's Letter)
13	13 November	27 June	"Aramisu no kisaku" (アラミスの奇策 Aramis resorts to Clever Schemes)
14	20 November	11 July	"Arata naru inbo" (新たなる陰謀 Another Scheme of Richelieu)
15	27 November	18 July	"Miredi no sakuryaku" (ミレディーの策略 Milady's Plot)
16	4 December	25 July	"Kiken na tsuribashi" (危険なつり橋 An Insecure Suspension Bridge)
17	11 December	1 August	"Iza, Rondon e"(いざ、ロンドンへ Hurry up to London)
18	18 December	8 August	"Senjo no damashiai" (船上のだましあいCheating Milady on Board )
19	25 December	15 August	"Kybikazari no yukue" (首飾りの行方 The Queen's Necklace is Lost)
20	8 January 2010	22 August	"Haran no butokai" (波乱の舞踏会 A Ball with Trouble)
21	15 January	29 August	"Jushi eno michinori" (銃士への道のり A way to become a Musketeer)
22	22 January	5 September	"Atosu no kokai" (アトスの後悔 The Remorse of Athos)
23	29 January	12 September	"Miredi no takurami" (ミレディーのたくらみ Milady's Plot)
24	5 February	19 September	"Rishuryu no sasoi" (リシュリューの誘い The Cardinal's Offer)
25	12 February	26 September	"Toraware no Konsutansu" (とらわれのコンスタンス Imprisoned Constance)
26	19 February	3 October	"Yurusarenu koi" (許されぬ恋 Unoforgiven Love)
27	26 February	10 October	"Sanjushi tono ketsubetsu" (三銃士との決別 Farewell to the Three Musketeers)
28	5 March	17 October	"Honto no kimochi" (本当の気持ち Milady's real intention)
29	12 March	24 October	"Ikusa eno josho" (戦への序章 Prologue to the battle)
30	19 March	31 October	"Senjo e" (戦場へ Departure to La Rochelle)
31	26 March	7 November	"Roshuforu o sukue"(ロシュフォールを救え Save Rochefort)
32	2 April	14 November	"Tekisho, Bassonopieru"(敵将、バッソンピエール Bassonpiere, Leader of the Rebel Army)
33	9 April	21 November	"Darutanian kyushutsu sakusen" (ダルタニアン救出作戦 D'Artagnan has a Narrow Escape)
34	16 April	28 November	"Hanrangun tono kobo" (反乱軍との攻防 Offence and Defence against the Rebel)
35	23 April	5 December	"Tatakai no hate" (戦いの果て At the End of the Battle)
36	30 April	12 December	"Jinsei no kiro" (人生の岐路 Crossroads of Their Lives)
37	7 May	19 December	"Ketsudan no toki" (決断のとき Time of Decision)
38	14 May	26 December	"Toreviru no yuigon" (トレヴィルの遺言 The Last Words of Trėville)
39	21 May	26 December	"Saigo no tatakai" (最後の戦い The Last Battle)
40	28 May	26 December	"Jushitai-cho Darutanian" (銃士隊長ダルタニアン D'Artagnan, Captain of the Guards)

== Related programmes and events ==
From 5 to 10 October 2009, "Countdown! Shin Sanjushi" was broadcast daily by NHK Educational TV and "Shin Sanjushi Mamonaku Sutato Special" ("The Three Musketeers" will start soon) was broadcast on 12 October by NHK General TV. And another special programme was put on the air on 29 August 2010 by NHK General TV.

The puppetry was played on the stage in Yokohama Red Brick Warehouse from 23 to 25 July 2010.

== Media ==
- The DVD of eight volumes was released in 2014 by Happinet Pictures, a company of Bandai Namco Group.

At the end of the final episode in the DVD, voice actors/actresses appear one by one with the puppets they voice and bow to viewers. And at the end of the volume 6 (episode 30), main characters sing the ending theme "Hitori ja nai" by one phrase and finally becomes the chorus by all characters.

== See also ==
- The Three Musketeers Anime
- Sherlock Holmes, puppetry
