= Koji Yamamoto (actor) =

Japanese actor and singer

- 山本 耕史
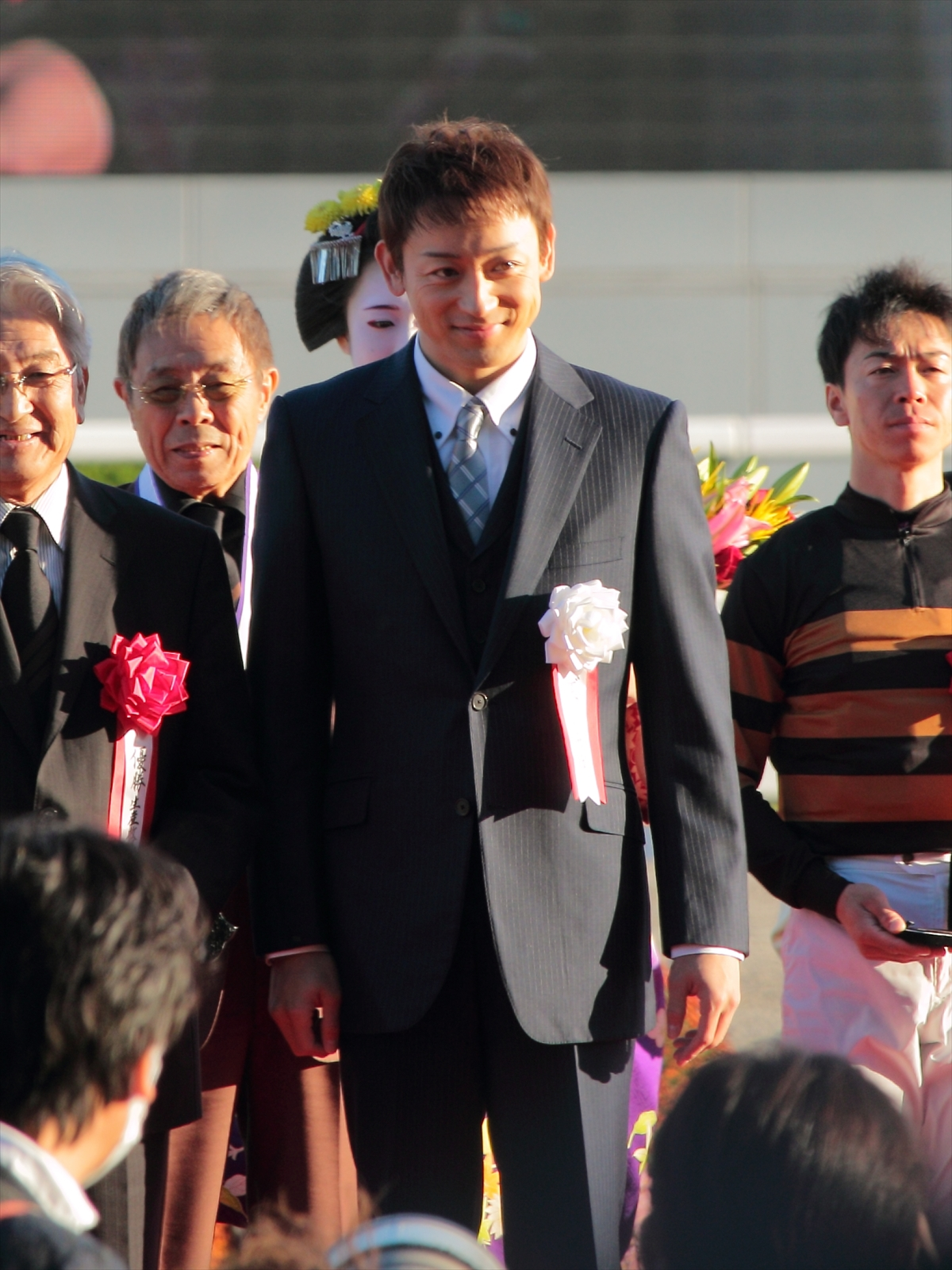
- Koji Yamamoto in 2015
- Born: 31 October 1976 (age 49); Shinjuku, Tokyo, Japan
- Occupation: Actor
- Years active: 1976–present
- Spouse: Maki Horikita (m. 2015)
- Children: 2

Koji Yamamoto (山本 耕史, Yamamoto Kōji; born 31 October 1976) is a Japanese actor and singer, who was born in Tokyo, Japan.

== Career ==
He began his career as a baby model at under one year of age. He also played Gavroche in the original Japanese cast and later Marius in the Japanese TOHO production of Les Misérables and appears on the 2003 "green" cast recording. His first major role was in 2004 in Shinsengumi!, as Hijikata Toshizō, a role he reprised for the 2006 sequel. This sequel portrays the last day of Hijikata Toshizō, Vice Commander of Shinsengumi and he reprised the role in Asa ga Kita eleven years later. In 2022 he also played Alien Mefilas in Shinji Higuchi's critically acclaimed tokusatsu superhero film Shin Ultraman.

== Personal life ==
Yamamoto married actress Maki Horikita on 22 August 2015, and their first child was born in December 2016. The couple became close in May 2015 when playing the role of lovers in the theatrical production Arashi ga Oka (Wuthering Heights), commenced dating in June 2015, and married in August 2015.

== Filmography ==
=== Film ===
- Tales of the Unusual (2000)
- Yumejūya (2007), Natsume Sōseki
- I Just Didn't Do It (2007), Tatsuo
- The Majic Hour (2008)
- Higanjima (2010)
- A Ghost of a Chance (2011)
- Ninja Kids!!! (2011)
- Galaxy Turnpike (2015), Tobe Shinzaemon
- Pretty Cure All Stars: Singing with Everyone Miraculous Magic! (2016), Trauuma (voice)
- Touken Ranbu (2019), Oda Nobunaga
- Hitotsubu no Mugi (2019), Yukiyoshi Shikata
- Startup Girls (2019), Mizuki
- Talking the Pictures (2019), Shōzō Makino
- Kamen Rider Reiwa: The First Generation (2019), Soreo Hiden / Kamen Rider Ichi-gata
- Extro (2020), Himself
- What Did You Eat Yesterday? (2021), Daisaku Kohinata
- Kappei (2022), Masayoshi
- Shin Ultraman (2022), Alien Mefilas
- Fullmetal Alchemist: The Revenge of Scar (2022), Alex Louis Armstrong
- Fullmetal Alchemist: The Final Alchemy (2022), Alex Louis Armstrong
- Kingdom 3: The Flame of Destiny (2023), Zhuang Zhao
- Kingdom 4: Return of the Great General (2024), Zhuang Zhao
- What If Shogun Ieyasu Tokugawa Was to Become the Prime Minister (2024), Hijikata Toshizō
- Cells at Work! (2024), Killer T Cell
- Dive in Wonderland (2025), Mad Hatter (voice)
- Bye Bye Love: Detective Is in the Bar (2026), Yutaro Okudera
- Darwin's Game (2027), Hiiragi

=== Television ===
- Under the Same Roof (1993–97), Fumiya Kashiwagi
- Boys Over Flowers (1996–97), Rui Hanazawa (voice)
- Shinsengumi! (2004), Hijikata Toshizō
- Shinsengumi!: Hijikata Toshizo Saigo no Ichinichi (2006), Hijikata Toshizō
- The Family (2007), Ginpei Manpyō
- Kagerō no Tsuji Inemuri Iwane Edo Zōshi (2007–17), Sakazaki Iwane
- Atashinchi no Danshi (2009), Shuji Tokita
- Jin (2009–10), Noguchi
- Wagaya no Rekishi (2010), Mitsunari Ano
- Mother (2010), Shunsuke Fujiyoshi
- Taira no Kiyomori (2012), Fujiwara no Yorinaga
- Asa ga Kita (2015), Hijikata Toshizō
- Sanada Maru (2016), Ishida Mitsunari
- Thrill (2017), Shin'nosuke Shirai
- Totto-chan! (2017), Moritsuna Kuroyanagi
- Hitoshi Ueki and Nobosemon (2017), Hitoshi Ueki
- Fūunji tachi (2018), Hiraga Gennai
- Naruto Hitchō (2018), Norizuki Gennojō
- Kishū Hanshu Tokugawa Yoshimune (2019), Tokugawa Yoshimune
- What Did You Eat Yesterday? (2019–23), Daisaku Kohinata
- Kamen Rider Zero-One (2019), Soreo Hiden
- A Warmed Up Love (2020), Ryō Kamiko
- An Incurable Case of Love (2020), Rokuro Koishikawa
- The 13 Lords of the Shogun (2022), Miura Yoshimura
- Hayabusa Fire Brigade (2023), Hiroshi Nakayamada
- Extremely Inappropriate! (2024), Kazuya Kurita
- Tokyo Swindlers (2024), Aoyagi
- The Laughing Salesman (2025)
- Extremely Inappropriate! Special (2026), Kazuya Kurita
- Hakone Ekiden: Our Story (2026), Shosuke Hirakawa

=== Theatre ===
- Les Misérables – Gavroche (Original cast (1987–1988)), Marius (2003–2004)
- Stand by Me – Chris (1991), Ace (1994)
- RENT – Mark (1998–1999)
- Cyrano – Christian de Neuvillette (2000–2001)
- Romeo and Juliet – Romeo (2001)
- The Pitchfork Disney – Cosmo (2002)
- Godspell – Jesus (2001–2010)
- Thank you! Broadway! Vol.2 (2002)
- The Pilgrim – Naotaro (2003)
- Tick, Tick... Boom! – Jon (2003–2006)
- Broadway Gala Concert 2005 (2005)
- Little Shop of Horrors – Seymour Krelborn (2005)
- The Last Five Years – Jamie (2005–2010)
- Hedwig and the Angry Inch – Hedwig (2007–2009)
- The Picture of Dorian Gray – Dorian (2009)
- Usani – Snake (2012)
- Mozart L'Opera Rock – Mozart / Salieri (2013)
- Napoleon – Montholon Earl (2013)
- Memphis – Huey Calhoun (2015)
- Wuthering Heights – Heathcliff (2015)
- Anastasia – Gleb (2020)

=== Video games ===
- Lost Judgment (2021) – Jin Kuwana

=== Dubbing ===
Live-action

- Jurassic World (2017 NTV edition), Owen Grady (Chris Pratt)
- Pinocchio, Jiminy Cricket (Joseph Gordon-Levitt)

Animation

- Puss in Boots: The Last Wish, Puss in Boots
- The Lion King II: Simba's Pride, Kovu

== Awards ==
Year	Award	Category	Work(s)	Result	Ref,
2005	29th Elan d'or Awards	Newcomer of the Year	Himself	Won	
2023	77th Mainichi Film Awards	Best Supporting Actor	Shin Ultraman	Nominated	
