= Welcome Back, Mr. McDonald =

- DVD Cover
- Directed by: Kōki Mitani
- Screenplay by: Kōki Mitani
- Produced by: Koichi Murakami; Hideyuki Takai
- Cinematography: Kenji Takama; Junichi Tozawa
- Edited by: Hirohide Abe
- Music by: Takayuki Hattori
- Production companies: Fuji TV; Premier International
- Distributed by: Toho
- Release date: 8 November 1997 (Japan)
- Running time: 103 minutes
- Country: Japan
- Language: Japanese

Welcome Back, Mr. McDonald (Japanese: ラヂオの時間, Hepburn: Rajio no Jikan; lit. "The Time of Radio") is a 1997 Japanese film directed by Kōki Mitani. It was popular in Japan upon its release and won 3 Japanese Academy Awards for Best Screenplay, Best Sound, and Best Supporting Actor (Nishimura Masahiko).

== Summary ==
A late-night live broadcast of a radio drama begins with none of the cast or crew being pleased with the project. When the lead actress Nokko Senbon (Keiko Toda) decides she won't play her role unless she's allowed to change her character's name, the whole cast eventually insists on changing various parts of the play to their liking. This begins a chain of events that completely changes every aspect of the story and requires the entire staff to participate in completing the drama, all while live on the air.

== Cast ==
- Toshiaki Karasawa as Manabu Kudo, the director
- Kyōka Suzuki as Miyako Suzuki, the writer
- Masahiko Nishimura as Tatsuhiko Ushijima, the producer
- Keiko Toda as Nokko Senbon, actress
- Inoue Jun as Mitsutoshi Hirose, actor
- Toshiyuki Hosokawa as Hamamura Jo, actor
- Kaoru Okunuki as Sumiko Nagai, assistant
- Zen Kajiwara as Harugoro Otaguro, staff
- Moro Morooka as Bucky, the writer
- Yoshimasa Kondo as Shiro Suzuki, Miyako's husband
- Akira Fuse as Shuji Horinouchi, the executive producer
- Shunji Fujimura as Mansaku Iori, security guard and Foley artist
- Shirô Namiki as Suguru Hosaka, announcer
- Hiromasa Taguchi as Makoto Tatsumi, sound mixer
- Yasukiyo Umeno as Furukawa
- Takehiko Ono as Ben Noda
- Ken Watanabe as truck driver
- Kaori Momoi as Takako Nakaura, DJ
- Bsaku Sato as Iwao Kamota, sleeping guy
- Somegoro Ichikawa as Kimihoko Saimeiji, control room
- Nobuko Miyamoto as Rumiko Yamazaki, cleaning lady

== Release ==
Welcome Back, Mr. McDonald was released in Japan on November 8, 1997 where it was distributed by Toho. The film was released by Tidepoint Pictures/Viz Film in the United States in 1999.

The film won the Best Screenplay award at the Mainichi Film Concours. At the Japanese Academy Awards, Masahiko Nishimura won the award for Best Supporting Actor (also for Woman of the Police Protection Program) and for Most Popular Performer, and the film won for Best Sound.
