= Masahiko Nishimura =

Japanese theatre and film actor (born 1960)

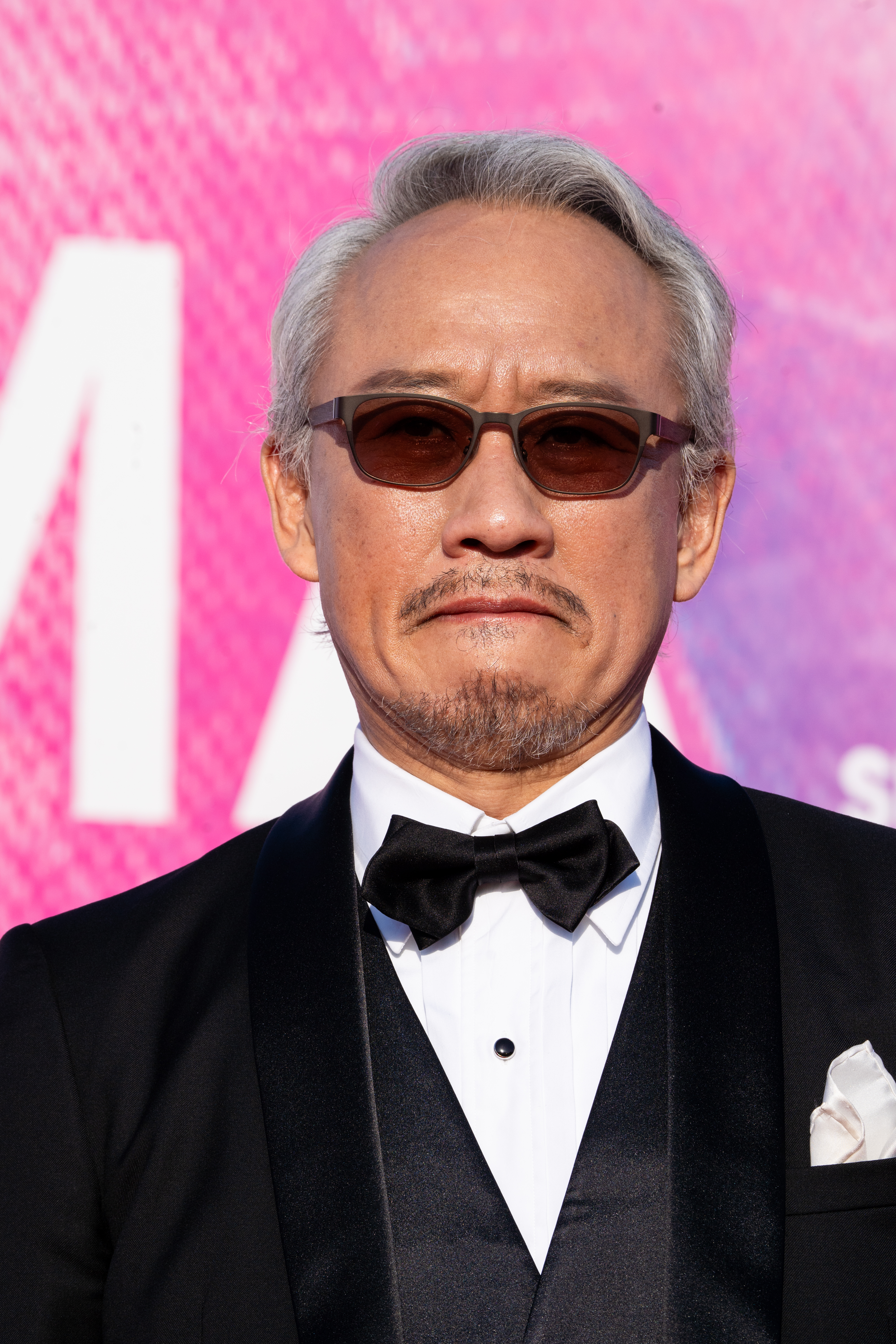
- Born: December 12, 1960 (age 65); Toyama, Toyama, Japan
- Occupation: Actor
- Years active: 1984–present

Masahiko Nishimura (西村 まさ彦, Nishimura Masahiko; born December 12, 1960) is a Japanese theatre and film actor. He is best known for his comedic portrayals.

== Biography ==
Nishimura was born on December 12, 1960, in Toyama, Toyama, Japan. While he attended Toyo University to study photography, he met Kōki Mitani, a script writer for radio and playwright who aspired to be an actor and who turned his attention to the theatre.

In 1983, Nishimura, Mitani and others including the actors Zen Kajiwara and Kazuyuki Aijima formed the Tokyo Sunshine Boys, a comedy troupe that grew in popularity over the following ten years. They produced the popular play 12 Gentle Japanese, a parody of Reginald Rose's 12 Angry Men. When 12 Gentle Japanese was adapted to film, Nishimura did not form part of the cast.

In the 1990s, the success of the Tokyo Sunshine Boys brought Nishimura parts in television dramas, notably a part in Furikaereba Yatsuga Iru and as the flamboyant Shintaro Imaizumi in Kōki Mitani's Furuhata Ninzaburo.

With the release of the Kōki Mitani film adaptation of the play Radio no Jikan in 1997, Nishimura won acclaim for his portrayal of a radio producer—a role for which he won the Best Supporting Actor award from the Japanese Academy Awards as well as a Blue Ribbon Award.

The Tokyo Sunshine Boys disbanded in 1998, but most of its actors, including Nishimura, continued to work in television.

== Awards ==
- Elan d'or Award for Newcomer of the Year (1997)
- Best Supporting Actor (Japanese Academy Awards) for Kōki Mitani Radio no Jikan
- Best Supporting Actor (Japanese Academy Award) for Juzo Itami Marutai no Onna
- Popularity Award "Most Popular Performer" for 1997
- Blue Ribbon Awards "Best Supporting Actor"
- Best Supporting Actor at the 22nd Hochi Film Award for Marutai no onna and Welcome Back, Mr. McDonald
- Kinema Junpo Award

== Filmography ==
=== Films ===
- Tomoko no baai (1996)
- Shichi-gatsu nano ka, Hare (1996)
- Radio no Jikan: Welcome Back Mr. McDonald (1997)
- Princess Mononoke (1997), Kōroku (voice)
- Marutai no onna (1997)
- The Black House (1999)
- Godzilla 2000 (1999)
- O-juken (1999)
- GTO (1999)
- Kawa no Nagare no Yō ni (2000)
- Denen no yuutsu (2001)
- Ghiblies: Episode 2 (2002)
- Ganryujima (2003), Sasaki Kojirō
- Nin Nin the Movie (2004)
- Furyo shonen no yume (2005)
- Warai no Daigaku (2006)
- Tokyo Family (2013), Kōichi Hirayama
- Samurai Hustle (2014), Sōma Kanetsugu
- Samurai Hustle Returns (2016), Sōma Kanetsugu
- The Magnificent Nine (2016)
- What a Wonderful Family! (2016)
- What a Wonderful Family! 2 (2017)
- Linking Love (2017)
- What a Wonderful Family! 3: My Wife, My Life (2018)
- Iwane: Sword of Serenity (2019)
- JK Rock (2019)
- Samurai Shifters (2019)
- The 47 Ronin in Debt (2019)
- Apparel Designer (2020)
- Angry Rice Wives (2021)
- The Supporting Actors: The Movie (2021), himself
- My Father's Tracks (2021)
- Dreaming of the Meridian Arc (2022)
- The Hound of the Baskervilles: Sherlock the Movie (2022)
- Mado (2022)
- The Ohara Family Rhapsody (2024)
- Our Last Day (2024)
- Goodbye, My Loved Ones! (2026)
- AnyMart (2026)
- Samurai Hustle: Full Throttle (2027), Sōma Kanetsugu

=== Television ===
- Furikaereba Yatsu ga Iru(1993)
- Furuhata Ninzaburo (1994), Shintaro Imaizumi
- Ousama no restoran (1995)
- Hideyoshi (1996), Tokugawa Ieyasu
- Otona no otoko (1997)
- Sōrito Yobanaide (1997), Executive Secretary to the Prime Minister
- Yamato Nadeshiko (2000)
- Yome wa mitsuboshi (2001)
- Koi no chikara (2002)
- Itsumo futari de (2003)
- Kanojo ga shinjatta (2004)
- Wonderful Life (2004)
- Nodame Cantabile (2006)
- The Family (2007)
- Sanada Maru (2016), Muroga Masatake
- Kyoaku wa Nemurasenai (2016), Nobutsuna Nakae
- Kurara: The Dazzling Life of Hokusai's Daughter (2017), Nishimura Yohachi
- Awaiting Kirin (2020), Akechi Mitsuyasu
- Unbound (2025), Nishimura Yohachi
