= Galaxy Turnpike =

- Poster

Japanese name
- Kanji: ギャラクシー街道
Transcriptions
- Revised Hepburn: Gyarakushī Kaidō
- Directed by: Kōki Mitani
- Screenplay by: Kōki Mitani
- Produced by: Kazutoshi Wadakura; Megumi Nishihara; Kuga Maeda
- Starring: Shingo Katori; Haruka Ayase; Shun Oguri; Yūka; Takanori Nishikawa
- Cinematography: Hideo Yamamoto
- Edited by: Soichi Ueno
- Music by: Kiyoko Ogino
- Production companies: Toho; Cine Bazar; Fuji TV
- Distributed by: Toho
- Release date: October 24, 2015 (Japan)
- Running time: 109 minutes
- Country: Japan
- Language: Japanese
- Box office: ¥975 million (US$7.94 million)

Galaxy Turnpike (Japanese: ギャラクシー街道, Hepburn: Gyarakushī Kaidō) is a 2015 Japanese science fiction comedy film written and directed by Kōki Mitani. The film was released on October 24, 2015, in Japan.

== Plot ==
The film is set in 2265.

== Cast ==
- Shingo Katori
- Haruka Ayase
- Shun Oguri
- Yūka
- Takanori Nishikawa
- Kenichi Endō
- Yasunori Danta
- Kanji Ishimaru
- Sayaka Akimoto
- Kenji Anan

== Development ==
Galaxy Turnpike was filmed at Toho Studios in Tokyo in March 2015.

== Reception ==
The film was number-one on its opening weekend in Japan, with ¥270 million. It was also number-one on its second weekend, with US$1.5 million.
