= The Kiyosu Conference =

- Poster
- Directed by: Kōki Mitani
- Screenplay by: Kōki Mitani
- Based on: Kiyosu Kaigi by Kōki Mitani
- Produced by: Kuga Maeda; Kazutoshi Wadakura
- Starring: Kōji Yakusho; Yo Oizumi; Fumiyo Kohinata; Kōichi Satō
- Cinematography: Hideo Yamamoto
- Edited by: Soichi Ueno
- Music by: Kiyoko Ogino
- Production companies: Fuji Television; Cine Bazar
- Distributed by: Toho
- Release date: November 9, 2013 (Japan)
- Running time: 138 minutes
- Country: Japan
- Language: Japanese
- Box office: ¥2.87 billion

The Kiyosu Conference (Japanese: 清須会議, Hepburn: Kiyosu Kaigi) is a 2013 Japanese period comedy film directed by Kōki Mitani.

The film is based on a novel of the same name written by Mitani a year prior, itself a reference to the real-life Kiyosu Conference (Kiyosu Kaigi) held on June 27, 1582, the first joint political decision made in Japan.

== Synopsis ==
In June of 1582, Japanese feudal lord Oda Nobunaga, who'd been leading a campaign to reunify the country in the midst of the Sengoku period, is betrayed and assassinated in Kyoto by his vassal Akechi Mitsuhide, along with his oldest son and heir, Oda Nobutada. Soon after, Nobunaga's charismatic, peasant-born senior vassal, Hashiba Hideyoshi, rallies his forces and leads an attack against Akechi, defeating him in battle and killing him. With the Oda clan's liege lord and his heir dead, the clan's vassal lords arrange for a conference in Kiyosu Castle to decide who will be appointed as the Clan's new lord.

The Oda Clan's war seasoned Chief Vassal, Shibata Katsuie, favors the appointment of Nobunaga's third son, Oda Nobutaka, whom he considers skilled if uncharismatic, while the ambitious Hideyoshi supports the clownish middle son, Oda Nobukatsu, since he sees him as easy to manipulate. Shibata and Hideyoshi arrive in Kiyosu on the same day and immediately begin vying for support for their preferred candidate amongst the influential members of the Clan. Shibata quickly gains the support of his oldest friend, the stern and dutiful fellow senior vassal Niwa Nagahide, while Hideyoshi, his wife Nene and his right-hand man Kuroda Kanbei gain the support of Nobunaga's younger brother Oda Nobukane and his daughter-in-law Matsu. Shibata and Hideyoshi also seek the support of Nobunaga's beloved younger sister Oichi, whom they are also both smitten with. Oichi dislikes Shibata due to his brutish personality but hates Hideyoshi because he'd been responsible for the murder of her husband on Nobunaga's behalf, so Oichi lends support to Shibata. Shibata makes continued efforts to impress Oichi, which mostly fall flat but he gradually charms her due to his dedication.

The conference is unexpectedly delayed due to the abscence of the last senior vassal, Takigawa Kazumasu, who's been waylaid by an attack on his army. Though Takigawa's army is scattered, the senior vassal escapes and tries to make it to the conference on foot by himself. On the second day, with Takigawa still missing, Hideyoshi proposes the promotion of Ikeda Tsuneoki to the position of senior vassal to fill the vacancy and avoid further delays. Shibata opposes this, since Takigawa is likely to align with him, so he and Hideyoshi get into an embarassing public scuffle before ultimately reaching a compromise: Ikeda will be promoted and Takigawa will be given another day to arrive. After Ikeda is promoted, Shibata and Hideyoshi both attempt to win him over with the promise of land grants. Ikeda is initially tempted by Hideyoshi's better offers but hesitates due to Nobukatsu's well-known foolishness.

On the third day, Hideyoshi arranges for a game of "race for the flag" between the two factions, ostensibly to pass the time but also hoping the more physically fit Nobukatsu will humiliate his younger brother in competition. Both factions cheat during the various rounds of the contest but, during the crucial final round between Nobutaka and Nobukatsu, Nobutaka ends up winning in spite of his slower speed because Nobukatsu gets distracted and runs past the flag. A humiliated Hideyoshi and Kanbei have a chance encounter with Nene and Matsu while they play with Matsu's son, Sanboshi. As Hideyoshi plays with the young boy, Kanbei comes up with an idea: Instead of supporting Nobukatsu, they ought to support Sanboshi, whose youth makes him easy to influence like Nobukatsu but who is more respectable due to prodigious heritage from both the Oda and Takeda clans.

That evening, Shibata absents himself from a feast held by Nobutaka for the Clan vassals so he can have a private dinner with Oichi. Shibata's abscence makes Nobutaka nervous and he stumbles through his speech. Niwa chides Shibata for allowing his infatuation with Oichi to distract him from their purpose but Shibata rebukes him. Later, Hideyoshi meets with Niwa and attempts to convince him to support Sanboshi, saying that Nobutaka lacks his father's courage and charisma, while Sanboshi still has the chance to develop into a worthy successor to his grandfather. Though Niwa is initially intransigent, Hideyoshi's arguments make him doubt himself.

On the fourth day, the four present senior vassals gather to make a decision. Shibata is outraged when Hideyoshi changes his position to support Sanboshi, and is then enraged when Ikeda sides with him. Hideyoshi proceeds to make Sanboshi's case but Shibata says his efforts are moot since he and Niwa will vote against him and, when Takigawa arrives, he'll side with them too. However, to Shibata's shock, Niwa votes with Hideyoshi instead and Sanboshi is made heir. To appease Shibata, Niwa conditions his vote on Nobutaka being appointed as Sanboshi's guardian until he comes of age, which Hideyoshi begrudginly agrees to in spite of it conflicting with his plans to control the young lord. The matter initially appears settled until that afternoon, when Sanboshi refuses to attend his induction ceremony and Nobutaka is unable to coax him. Hideyoshi seizes the opportunity and performs monkeyshines for the young lord to calm him, after which he escorts him to the induction and sits on the Oda throne with the boy on his lap, much to Shibata's horror.

That night, Oichi persuades Shibata that Hideyoshi must be killed. With help from the finally arrived Takigawa, Shibata procures the services of a group of ninja, who attack Hideyoshi but are forced to retreat due to the intervention of Shibata's own vassal, Maeda Toshiie, who believes Hideyoshi's murder would lead to civil war. After saving him, Maeda questions Hideyoshi's motives, to which Hideyoshi replies that, aside from his own personal ambition, he believes that men of war like Shibata will be useless in a unified Japan and instead men like him who are good at governing will be what the country needs. After the failed hit, Hideyoshi goes to Shibata's chambers and asks for guest right to avoid further attacks. Shibata, impressed by Hideyoshi's boldness, allows it and agrees to a truce.

On the fifth day, all gathered lords prepare to leave the castle. Hideyoshi meets with Oichi, who tells him that she's going to marry Shibata, mostly to spite Hideyoshi, since marrying the man he hates most instead of him is the only way she can now take revenge for her husband's death. Shibata crosses paths with Niwa and both men share a grudging goodbye, acknowledging that they can no longer be friends. As Shibata departs, Hideyoshi catches up to his procession and tries to make peace by asking him to stay in his position of Chief Vassal for their new lord. Shibata accepts and both men part on seemingly good terms but, in secret, both know they will inevitably come into conflict again. As Shibata leaves, Hideyoshi laughingly promises his wife that he will one day rule the world.

== Cast ==
- Kōji Yakusho as Shibata Katsuie
- Yo Oizumi as Hashiba Hideyoshi
- Fumiyo Kohinata as Niwa Nagahide
- Kōichi Satō as Ikeda Tsuneoki
- Satoshi Tsumabuki as Oda Nobukatsu
- Bandō Minosuke II as Oda Nobutaka
- Tadanobu Asano as Maeda Toshiie
- Susumu Terajima as Kuroda Kanbei
- Kenichi Matsuyama as Hori Hidemasa
- Yūsuke Iseya as Oda Nobukane
- Kyōka Suzuki as Oichi
- Miki Nakatani as Nene
- Ayame Goriki as Matsuhime
- Keiko Toda as Naka
- Toshiyuki Nishida as Sarashina Rokubei
- Denden as Maeda Gen'i
- Eisuke Sasai as Oda Nobunaga
- Nakamura Kankurō VI as Oda Nobutada
- Kenji Anan as Takigawa Kazumasu
- Kazuyuki Asano as Akechi Mitsuhide
- Shōta Sometani as Mori Ranmaru
- Hinata Sasaki as Chacha
- Moeka Konno as Hatsu
- Itsuki Moriyama as Gō

== Reception ==
By December 21, the film had grossed ¥2.87 billion (US$27.3 million) in Japan.
