= Keiko Toda =

Japanese actress (born 1957)

- 戸田 恵子
- Born: September 12, 1957 (age 69); Nagoya, Aichi, Japan
- Other name: Ayu Akemi
- Occupations: Actress; voice actress; singer; narrator
- Years active: 1969–present
- Agent: LOOK UP
- Spouses: Shuichi Ikeda (1979–???); Junichi Inoue (m. 1990; div. 2006)

Japanese name
- Hiragana: とだ けいこ
- Katakana: トダ ケイコ
Transcriptions
- Romanization: Toda Keiko

Keiko Toda (戸田 恵子, Toda Keiko; born September 12, 1957) is a Japanese actress, voice actress, singer and narrator.

Her most famous role is as the voice of the titular character of Anpanman in the long-running children's television anime Let's Go! Anpanman. She also voiced Kiki of Sanrio's Little Twin Stars and the titular character Thomas the Tank Engine in the Japanese dub of Thomas & Friends for the first eight seasons before being replaced by Kumiko Higa. She had been once married to Shuichi Ikeda and Junichi Inoue.

== Career ==
Toda first became an actress in fifth grade and then relocated to Tokyo in 1973 to become an idol singer. She then later joined Nachi Nozawa's theatre company. Also a musical theatre actress, she has appeared in musicals like "Sweet Charity" and "Dance of the Fleet Lady". She won Japanese Academy Award as the supporting actress for Welcome Back, Mr. McDonald in 1997.

Toda has dubbed over actresses like Jodie Foster, Linda Hamilton, Sigourney Weaver, Sandra Bullock, Michelle Pfeiffer and Carrie-Anne Moss for dubs of American live-action movies. She's voiced Rui Kisugi for the new animated City Hunter movie, taking over from fellow voice actress Toshiko Fujita, whom she had a sister-like relationship with. Her hobbies include dancing, singing, driving, watching Broadway musicals and poem chanting.

== Filmography ==
=== Television drama ===
- Sōrito Yobanaide (1997)
- Power Office Girls (1998), Azusa Tokunaga
- Hero (2001), Kanako Moriwaki
- Shinsengumi! (2004), Otose
- Densha Otoko (2005), Kasumi Yamada
- Kimi ga Kureta Natsu (2007), The Nurse
- Taiyo to Umi no Kyoshitsu (2008), Kyoka Hasebe
- Wagaya no Rekishi (2010), Shizuko Kasagi
- 5→9 From Five to Nine (2015), Keiko Kakuraba
- Natsuzora: Natsu's Sky (2019), Kasumi Kemuri
- Koeharu! (2021), Meiko's grandmother
- The Makanai: Cooking for the Maiko House (2023), Kimie Sakurai
- Our Happy Family (2025), Fumie Hirayama
- Anpan (2025), Tetsuko Maki and Yoshiko Tobe (voice)
- Soda Master (2026), Mysterious Woman (Ep. 11)

=== Other television ===
- 76th NHK Kōhaku Uta Gassen (2025), Performer of Anpanman theme song along Ryusei Nakao, Koichi Yamadera, and others.

=== Film ===
- Welcome Back, Mr. McDonald (1997), Nokko Senbon
- Tales of the Unusual (2000), Riku
- Minna no Ie (2001), Customer
- Nin x Nin (2004), Taeko Mitsuba
- The Uchōten Hotel (2006), Tokiko Yabe
- Kabei: Our Mother (2008), Teruyo Nogami (adult)
- Into the White Night (2011), Yaiko Kirihara
- A Ghost of a Chance (2011), Landlady
- The Kiyosu Conference (2013), Naka
- Stardust Over the Town (2020)
- Good-Bye (2020)
- His (2020), Sakurai
- We Made a Beautiful Bouquet (2021), Sachiko Hachiya
- Sono Koe no Anata e (2022), Herself
- Yudo: The Way of the Bath (2023)
- Detective of Joshidaikoji (2023)

=== Television animation ===
- Mobile Suit Gundam (1979), Matilda Ajan
- Space Runaway Ideon (1980), Karala Ajiba
- Queen Millennia (1981), Hajime Amamori
- Maya the Honey Bee (1982), Alexander the Mouse (Maushii)
- Cat's Eye (1983–85), Hitomi Kisugi
- GeGeGe no Kitarō (3rd Series) (1985), Kitarō
- Let's Go! Anpanman (1988), Anpanman
- Oniisama e... (1991), Kaoru Orihara
- City Hunter: The Secret Service (1996), Rosa Martinez
- Lupin III: The Columbus Files (1999), Rosalia
- Requiem from the Darkness (2004), Tatsuta
- Healin' Good Pretty Cure (2020), Tiatine
- Dragon Quest: The Adventure of Dai (2021), Dragon Crystal and Mother Dragon
- Urusei Yatsura (2022), Ataru's mom

=== Theatrical animation ===
- Mobile Suit Gundam (1981), Matilda Ajan
- Mobile Suit Gundam: Soldiers of Sorrow (1981), Matilda Ajan
- Space Runaway Ideon: A Contact (1982), Karala Ajiba
- Space Runaway Ideon: Be Invoked (1982), Karala Ajiba
- Bio Booster Armor Guyver (1986), Valcuria
- Toki no Tabibito -Time Stranger- (1986), Agino Jiro
- Kiki's Delivery Service (1989), Osono
- A Wind Named Amnesia (1990), Sophia
- Pokémon 4Ever (2001), Yukinari
- Anpanman: Apple Boy and Everyone's Hope (2014), Anpanman
- City Hunter: Shinjuku Private Eyes (2019), Hitomi Kisugi and Rui Kisugi
- Code Geass: Lelouch of the Re;surrection (2019), Shamna
- Gold Kingdom and Water Kingdom (2023), Leopoldine
- City Hunter: Angel Dust (2023), Hitomi Kisugi
- The Colors Within (2024), Shino Sakunaga
- Anpanman: Baikinman and Lulun in the Picture Book (2024), Anpanman
- Dive in Wonderland (2025)

=== Original video animation (OVA) ===
- Fight! Iczer One (1985), Iczer Two
- Vampire Hunter D (1985), Dan
- Yōtōden (1987), Ayanosuke
- Iczer Reborn (1990), Iczer Two

=== Original net animation (ONA) ===
- Lupin the 3rd vs. Cat's Eye (2023), Hitomi Kisugi

=== Video games ===
- Popful Mail (1994), Tatto (PC Engine version)
- Gulliver Boy (1995), Nikita
- Jade Cocoon (1998), Garai
- Mobile Suit Gundam: Journey to Jaburo (2000), Matilda Ajan
- Everybody's Golf 5 (2007), Teana

=== Puppetry ===
- The Three Musketeers (2009), Milady de Winter
- Sherlock Holmes (2014), Isadora Klein

=== Dubbing ===
==== Live-action ====
- Jodie Foster
  - The Accused (1998 TV Asahi version), Sarah Tobias
  - The Silence of the Lambs (1995 TV Asahi version), Clarice Starling
  - Maverick (1997 NTV version), Annabelle Bransford
  - Nell, Nell Kellty
  - Contact (2001 TV Tokyo version), Dr. Eleanor Arroway
  - Anna and the King (2007 TV Tokyo version), Anna Leonowens
  - Flightplan, Kyle Pratt
  - Elysium, Defense Secretary Delacourt
- Julia Roberts
  - Pretty Woman, Vivian Ward
  - Dying Young, Hilary O'Neil
  - My Best Friend's Wedding, Julianne Potter
  - Notting Hill, Anna Scott
  - Erin Brockovich (2003 TV Asahi version), Erin Brockovich
  - Full Frontal, Catherine/Francesca
  - Larry Crowne, Mercedes Tainot
- Sigourney Weaver
  - Alien (1992 TV Asahi version), Ellen Ripley
  - Aliens (1989 TV Asahi version), Ellen Ripley
  - Alien 3 (1998 TV Asahi version), Ellen Ripley
  - Alien: Resurrection (1997 Fuji TV version), Ellen Ripley
  - Political Animals, Elaine Barrish
- 12 Monkeys, Kathryn Railly (Madeleine Stowe)
- American Graffiti (1984 TBS version), Laurie Henderson (Cindy Williams)
- Back to the Future Part III (2018 BS Japan version), Clara Clayton (Mary Steenburgen)
- Beauty and the Beast, Agathe (Hattie Morahan)
- Beetlejuice Beetlejuice, Delia Deetz (Catherine O'Hara)
- A Better Tomorrow III: Love & Death in Saigon, Chow Ying-kit (Anita Mui)
- The Big C, Cathy Jamison (Laura Linney)
- Blade Runner (1986 TBS version), Rachael (Sean Young)
- Cat People (1985 Fuji TV edition), Irena Gallier (Nastassja Kinski)
- Charlie's Angels, Julie Rogers (Tanya Roberts)
- Conan the Barbarian (1989 TV Asahi version), Valeria (Sandahl Bergman)
- Days of Thunder (1993 TBS version), Dr. Claire Lewicki (Nicole Kidman)
- The English Patient, Katharine Clifton (Kristin Scott Thomas)
- Eternals, Ajak (Salma Hayek)
- The First Lady, Eleanor Roosevelt (Gillian Anderson)
- Flashdance, Alexandra "Alex" Owens (Jennifer Beals)
- Flubber, Dr. Sara Jean Reynolds (Marcia Gay Harden)
- Gone with the Wind (1988 NTV version), Scarlett O'Hara (Vivien Leigh)
- The Hand That Rocks the Cradle, Mrs. Mott (Rebecca De Mornay)
- Hard to Kill, Andy Stewart (Kelly LeBrock)
- Home Alone 3 (2019 NTV edition), Karen Pruitt (Haviland Morris)
- I Am Sam (2005 NTV edition), Rita Harrison Williams (Michelle Pfeiffer)
- The Last Emperor (1989 TV Asahi edition), Yoshiko Kawashima (Maggie Han)
- Malcolm X, Betty Shabazz (Angela Bassett)
- The Matrix trilogy (Fuji TV version), Trinity (Carrie-Anne Moss)
- Medicine Man, Dr. Rae Crane (Lorraine Bracco)
- My Big Fat Greek Life, Nia Miller (Nia Vardalos)
- Never Talk to Strangers (Dr. Sarah Taylor (Rebecca De Mornay))
- The NeverEnding Story (Atreyu (Noah Hathaway)
- Nine Months, Rebecca Taylor-Faulkner (Julianne Moore)
- The Nude Bomb (1988 TV Asahi edition), Agent 22 (Andrea Howard)
- Only Murders in the Building, Jan Bellows (Amy Ryan)
- The Others, Grace Stewart (Nicole Kidman)
- Playing by Heart, Meredith (Gillian Anderson)
- Predator 2, Detective Leona Cantrell (María Conchita Alonso)
- Raiders of the Lost Ark (1985 Nippon TV edition), Marion Ravenwood (Karen Allen)
- Red Sonja, Red Sonja (Brigitte Nielsen)
- Rumble in the Bronx, Elaine (Anita Mui)
- Scarface (1989 TV Asahi version), Elvira Hancock (Michelle Pfeiffer)
- Shazam! Fury of the Gods, Hespera (Helen Mirren)
- Showgirls, Cristal Connors (Gina Gershon)
- The Sound of Music (2011 TV Tokyo edition), Baroness Elsa von Schraeder (Eleanor Parker)
- Speed, Annie Porter (Sandra Bullock)
- Speed 2: Cruise Control, Annie Porter (Sandra Bullock)
- The Terminator (1987 TV Asahi version), Sarah Connor (Linda Hamilton)
- Terminator: Dark Fate, Sarah Connor (Linda Hamilton)
- Thomas and the Magic Railroad, Lily's Mother (Lori Hallier)
- Trading Places (1986 NTV/1992 Fuji TV edition), Ophelia (Jamie Lee Curtis)
- True Lies, Helen Tasker (Jamie Lee Curtis)
- Trust the Man, Rebecca (Julianne Moore)
- The X-Files (TV Asahi version), Dana Scully (Gillian Anderson)

==== Animation ====
- A Boy Named Charlie Brown, Schroeder
- Balto, Jenna
- Cars, Sally Carrera
- Cars 2, Sally Carrera
- Cars 3, Sally Carrera
- Coraline, Mel Jones and Other Mother/The Beldam
- Early Man, the Queen Oofeefa
- Final Fantasy: The Spirits Within, Aki Ross
- Lady and the Tramp, Darling
- The Simpsons, Dana Scully
- Strings, Eike
- Thomas & Friends, Thomas the Tank Engine (1990 to 2007)
- Thomas and the Magic Railroad, Thomas the Tank Engine
- Toy Story, Bo Peep
- Toy Story 2, Bo Peep
- Toy Story 4, Bo Peep
- Toy Story 5, Bo Peep
