= The Magic Hour (2008 film) =

2008 Japanese film by Kōki Mitani

- Japanese poster
- Directed by: Kōki Mitani
- Screenplay by: Kōki Mitani
- Produced by: Yumiko Shigeoka; Kuga Maeda; Kazutoshi Wadakura
- Starring: Kōichi Satō; Satoshi Tsumabuki; Eri Fukatsu; Haruka Ayase; Toshiyuki Nishida
- Cinematography: Hideo Yamamoto
- Edited by: Sōichi Ueno
- Music by: Kiyoko Ogino
- Production companies: Fuji Television; Toho Studios
- Distributed by: Toho
- Release date: June 7, 2008 (Japan)
- Running time: 136 minutes
- Country: Japan
- Language: Japanese
- Box office: $38.2 million

The Magic Hour (Japanese: ザ・マジックアワー) is a 2008 Japanese comedy film written and directed by Kōki Mitani. Set in the fictional port town of Sukago, the film depicts the slapstick that ensues when an unsuccessful actor is turned into a "legendary hit man" by the boss of the town who has his hands on his mistress.

The film features numerous homages to famous scenes from Hollywood classics and Japanese masterpieces. For example, Eri Fukatsu sings on the crescent moon in the play, which is Woody Allen's Sweet and Lowdown, and the song is I'm Forever Blowing Bubbles, which Sean Penn sang to Samantha Morton.

According to photography experts, "the golden hour, sometimes called the 'magic hour', is roughly the first hour of light after sunrise, and the last hour of light before sunset, although the exact duration varies between seasons. During these times the sun is low in the sky, producing a soft, diffused light which is much more flattering than the harsh midday sun." In photography and cinematography, the magic hour is only a moment and the most beautiful time of the day, when afterglow of a sunset lights up. By extension, in this film, the phrase refers to "the most glittering years of everyone's lives".

A Chinese remake, Too Cool to Kill, was released in 2022.

== Production ==
=== Set ===
Filming took place from July 21 to September 29, 2007. The huge set of the fictional port town was created using three studios at Toho Studios in Seijo, Tokyo, and was based on the prostitute district in Billy Wilder's Irma la Douce. As with other Mitani films, the sets for this film were created by production designer Yōhei Taneda, who created a huge fictional cityscape inside the studio. This was called one of the largest set in the history of Japanese film studios. Even the scenery outside the second-floor window, which would normally have been painted in the background, was filled with real sets. In front of the well-constructed set, Mitani suggested turning it into an amusement park after shooting, but Taneda refused, saying, "Film art becomes a space that exists only in the film when it is destroyed after shooting," The set was demolished immediately after shooting. The large set occupied a huge Toho studio, and the flow of its construction can be seen in the end roll.

=== Play within a play ===
- This film marks film director Kon Ichikawa's last appearance and was dedicated in his memory. (This message can be seen in the end of this film.) In this film, movie director played by Kon Ichikawa is shooting 101 Dark Women (Kuroi Hyaku-ichi-nin no Onna), a parody of Ten Dark Women (Kuroi Ju-nin no Onna) in his lifetime.
- There are three short short films within a film.
  - 101 Dark Women (Kuroi Hyaku-ichi-nin no Onna)
  A potential sequel parody of Kon Ichikawa's work Ten Dark Women
  Cast: Kiichi Nakai, Yūki Amami and hundred women
  Assistant director: Koji Yamamoto
  - Underworld Bouncer (Ankokugai no Yojinbo) Homage to Casablanca
  Cast: Shōsuke Tanihara, Kyōka Suzuki, Yasuhumi Terawaki, Keisuke Horibe
  - A true story of lawlessness (Jitsuroku Muho-chitai)
  Cast: Toshiaki Karasawa

== Premise ==
Taiki Murata (Koichi Sato), an unsuccessful actor, and his manager Kenjuro Hasegawa (Fumiyo Kohinata) come to the port town of Skago to shoot a movie. In fact, Noboru Bingo (Satoshi Tsumabuki), a nightclub owner in Skago, has been messing around with Mari Takachiho (Eri Fukatsu), the mistress of the town's gang leader, Konosuke Teshio (Toshiyuki Nishida), but Teshio has found out about it. Bingo was almost killed by Teshio, who told him to bring the legendary assassin Della Togashi if he wanted to be saved. However He did not know Della Togashi, so decided to bring a fake. Murata, who knows nothing about it, plays the role of Della Togashi in front of Teshio with his signature overacting. Teshio, whose life is threatened by Jun Ebola (Teruyuki Kagawa), who is in conflict with the gang Teshio Shokai, decides to use Della Togashi to protect himself. Eventually, the plan goes awry and Murata realizes that he was not filming the movie. Deciding that all is not well, Murata calls his film friends to Scago and comes up with a play to fool Teshio, but Teshio and Mari both escape. The real assassin, Della Togashi, appears before Murata. Murata and his film crew collaborate to put on a once-in-a-lifetime act to fool Della Togashi.

== Reception ==
=== Critical response ===
The Magic Hour received mostly positive reviews from critics. Film critic Jiro Fukumoto wrote in Judge Movie, "Mitani's self-deprecating sense of humor also adds just the right amount of spice to the film, while extolling the essence of cinema, namely that reality is born of gimmicks and bluffs. The screenplay, which sublimates what the audience expects from the filmmaker into a brilliant metaphor, is excellent." On the same website, critic Machiko Watari commented, "The film seems to be a comedy only for laughs, but it is a profound work. Many Mitani films are concerned with the boundary between truth and falsehood, but the theme of a lie that is ultimately moving is profound, just like the film itself. Koichi Sato, who deliberately plays the role poorly, makes us laugh, and I was glad to see his homage to many classic films. Ryoichi Maeda of "Super Film Critique" praised the unsuccessful actor played by Sato as a goofy, and as a sitcom, it was outstandingly entertaining.

=== Promotion ===
The film was actively promoted by director Kōki Mitani. Mitani appeared in 150 media outlets before the release date of June 7, 2008, and traveled around Japan in a campaign to become a billboard himself. On June 7, the first day of the film's release, director Mitani and leading actors Koichi Sato, Satoshi Tsumabuki, Toshiyuki Nishida, Eri Fukatsu, Haruka Ayase, Fumiyo Kohinata, Keiko Toda, and Goro Ibuki gave stage greetings. When he appeared on a Downtown's variety show to promote his film, he was punished and had Japanese horseradish stuck up his nose. Mitani continued to appear in all kinds of media day after day to promote the film, and finally some viewers complained that he was appearing in too many publicity stunts, and he was secretly hurt.

=== Achievement ===
It was also a hot topic of conversation that some of the biggest actors in the lead roles made spot appearances in the play. Within two weeks of its release, the film already drew an audience of 1.6 million and grossed over 2 billion yen. On June 21 and 22, Mitani visited five theaters in Tokyo to greet the audience in appreciation of the blockbuster hit. On the final night of the stage greeting on June 22, starring Koichi Sato and Susumu Terajima also made an appearance.

=== Nominations ===
With regards to its cinematic impact on Japanese and Asian cinema, The Magic Hour was nominated for the 2009 Japan Academy Film Prize in eight categories (best actor, best art direction, best director, best editing, best film, best film score, best screenplay, best sound) and for the 2009 Asian Film Awards in three categories (best actress, best production designer, best screenwriter).

Award	Category	Name	Result
32nd Japan Academy Film Prize	Picture of the Year	The Magic Hour	Nominated
32nd Japan Academy Film Prize	Director of the Year	Koki Mitani	Nominated
32nd Japan Academy Film Prize	Screenplay of the Year	Kōki Mitani	Nominated
32nd Japan Academy Film Prize	Outstanding Performance by an Actor in a Leading Role	Koichi Sato	Nominated
32nd Japan Academy Film Prize	Outstanding Achievement in Music	Kiyoko Ogino	Nominated
32nd Japan Academy Film Prize	Outstanding Achievement in Art Direction	Yohei Taneda	Nominated
32nd Japan Academy Film Prize	Outstanding Achievement in Sound Recording	Tetsuo Segawa	Nominated
32nd Japan Academy Film Prize	Outstanding Achievement in Film Editing	Soichi Ueno	Nominated
3rd Asian Film Awards	Best Actress	Eri Fukatsu	Nominated
3rd Asian Film Awards	Best Screenwriter	Koki Mitani	Nominated
3rd Asian Film Awards	Best Production Designer	Yohei Taneda	Nominated

=== Box office ===
The film grossed ¥3.92 billion ($37.93 million) in Japan. It also grossed $300,475 in other Asian territories, for a total of $38,230,475 grossed in Asia.

== Cast ==
Kōichi Satō as Taiki Murata
He is an unsuccessful actor. He is always overacting and can only get stunt and extra work, but he gets along well with the backstage staff. He is deceived by Bingo, who pretends to be a film director, and comes to Skago to play Della Togashi in a fake film, his first starring role.
Satoshi Tsumabuki as Noboru Bingo
He is the second manager of the club "Red Shoes" and Teshio's subordinate. When he is caught messing around with Tessio's mistress Mari, he is forced to search for the legendary hitman Della Togashi. Unable to find him, however, he tries to deceive Tessio by bringing in Murata, an unsuccessful actor, under the guise of filming a movie.
Toshiyuki Nishida as Konosuke Teshio
He is the boss of the Teshio Shokai, a gang that controls Suga-go. Della Togashi, an assassin hired by the upstart Ebora Shokai, is after his life.
Haruka Ayase as Natsuko Shikama
An employee of the club "Red Shoes". She feels a liking for her boss, Bingo.
Eri Fukatsu as Mari Takachiho
Teshio's mistress, a former dancer in "Red Shoes". She is fed up with Teshio's attempts to keep her close, and tries to flee the town with Bingo.
Fumiyo Kohinata as Kenjuro Hasegawa
Murata's manager. He often speaks ill of Murata, but he is also Murata's biggest fan and a good understanding person.
Teruyuki Kagawa as Jun Ebola
Chairman of Ebora Shokai. He started Ebora Shokai by splitting the business from Teshio Shokai, and within a few years, Ebora Shokai became a threat to Teshio Shokai. Della Togashi's employer.
