= The Uchōten Hotel =

2006 film by Kōki Mitani

- Film poster
- Directed by: Kōki Mitani
- Written by: Kōki Mitani
- Produced by: Yumiko Shigeoka; Yasushi Ogawa; Minami Ichikawa
- Starring: Kōji Yakusho; Takako Matsu; Kōichi Satō; Shingo Katori; Ryoko Shinohara; Keiko Toda; Katsuhisa Namase; Kumiko Asō; You; Masanori Ishii; Joe Odagiri; Mieko Harada; Toshiaki Karasawa; Masahiko Tsugawa; Shirō Itō; Toshiyuki Nishida
- Cinematography: Hideo Yamamoto
- Edited by: Soichi Ueno
- Music by: Yūsuke Honma
- Production companies: Cross Media; Fuji Television
- Distributed by: Toho
- Release date: January 14, 2006 (Japan)
- Running time: 136 minutes
- Country: Japan
- Language: Japanese
- Box office: ¥6.08 billion (Japan)

The Uchōten Hotel (Japanese: THE 有頂天ホテル, Hepburn: THE Uchōten Hoteru) (also known as Suite Dreams, The Wow-Choten Hotel, or Suite Hotel) is a 2006 Japanese comedy film written and directed by Kōki Mitani. The film is set in a five star Tokyo hotel on New Year's Eve and follows the misadventures of various hotel staff and guests between 10 p.m. and midnight.

The film is reminiscent of the Hollywood screwball comedies of the 1930s and 1940s, and explicitly references the 1932 film Grand Hotel, whose plot also followed the interlinked lives of various characters in a fictional hotel over a short period.

Cast members include Kōji Yakusho (Heikichi Shindo, the hotel accommodation manager), Takako Matsu (Hana Takemoto, the chamber-maid with a case of mistaken identity), Kōichi Satō (Katsutoshi Mutōda, the disgraced politician), Shingo Katori (Kenji Tadano, the bell boy with musical aspirations), Ryoko Shinohara (Yōko, the call girl), Keiko Toda (Tokiko Yabe, the deputy accommodation manager), Katsuhisa Namase (Takashi Seo), Kumiko Asō (Naomi Ohara), YOU (Cherry Sakura), and Toshiyuki Nishida (Zenbu Tokugawa, the aging enka star).

The film was nominated for 11 Japanese Academy Awards, but did not win in any of the categories.

== Plot ==
The plot involves numerous characters, the different problems or situations they face in the run-up to midnight, and the ways that these different storylines interact and are resolved. The various storylines include:

- Shindo, who used to work in the theatre, and who tries to hide the fact that he is now a hotel employee when his ex-wife unexpectedly arrives at the hotel.
- Shindo's ex-wife's husband, who is in the hotel to receive an award from a deer fertility research organisation, but is afraid his affair with Yōko will be found out.
- Yōko, the call girl who is having an affair with Shindo's ex-wife's husband, and gets involved with Mutōda in the course of the night.
- Takemoto, a chambermaid who is mistaken for the mistress of a wealthy elderly man. The elderly man's son offers her money to leave his father; she tries to ensure that the couple can remain together.
- Mutōda, a Senator who is in the hotel hiding from the media, following his involvement in a corruption scandal. He is also the father of Takemoto's son.
- Kenji, a bellboy who wants to be a musician, but has decided to give up on his dream.
- Zenbu Tokugawa, the veteran enka star who is suicidal when not performing on-stage.

== Reception ==
The film was the third highest-grossing domestic film at the Japanese box office in 2006 and, as of January 5, 2015, is the 93rd highest-grossing film in Japan, with ¥6.08 billion.
