= List of Japanese television dramas =

This is a list of Japanese television dramas, which are often referred to as dorama (ドラマ). The list includes notable dramas.

== 1970s ==
=== 1979 ===
1. Ore wa Abare Hatchaku, First aired on TV Asahi.

== 1980s ==
=== 1980 ===
1. Covert Journal of Yukihime's Journey (TBS)
2. 3 nen B gumi Kinpachi Sensei (3年B組金八先生) (TBS)
3. Hadaka no Taisho Horoki (裸の大将放浪記) (Fuji TV)

=== 1981 ===
1. Father's kitchen (おやじの台所) (TV Asahi)
2. Jikans Season 4 (事件) (NHK)
3. Kita no Kuni Kara (北の国から) (Fuji TV)

=== 1982 ===
1. Hiatari Ryōkō!, based on the manga series of the same name by Mitsuru Adachi

=== 1983 ===
1. Oshin, created by Sugako Hashida, starring Ayako Kobayashi and Yūko Tanaka. It is based on the fictional biography of a Japanese woman.

=== 1984 ===
1. Sanga Moyu, starring Matsumoto Hakuō II and Kenji Sawada. (NHK)

=== 1985 ===
1. Sukeban Deka, based on the manga series of the same name by Shinji Wada
2. Sukeban Deka II: Shōjo Tekkamen Densetsu
3. Ponytail wa Furimukanai

=== 1986 ===
1. Abunai Deka
2. Sukeban Deka 3: Shōjo Ninpōjō Denki

=== 1987 ===
1. Kamen Rider Black

== 1990s ==
=== 1991 ===
1. Tokyo Love Story (東京ラブストーリー) starring Yūji Oda, Honami Suzuki

=== 1992 ===
1. Sono toki Heartwa Nusumareta (その時ハ-トは盜まれた) - starring Sae Isshiki, Takuya Kimura and Yuki Uchida

=== 1995 ===
1. Aishiteiru to Itte Kure (愛していると言ってくれ)

=== 1996 ===
1. Long Vacation – starring Takuya Kimura, Tomoko Yamaguchi, Takako Matsu, Yutaka Takenouchi, Ryō, and Ryōko Hirosue
2. Furuhata Ninzaburo - by Kōki Mitani starring Masakazu Tamura, and Masahiko Nishimura.
3. Iguana Girl
4. Itazura Na Kiss - starring Aiko Sato and Takashi Kashiwabara

=== 1997 ===
1. Bayside Shakedown (踊る大捜査線) - starring Yūji Oda.
2. Glass Mask (Series 1) (ガラスの仮面) - starring Yumi Adachi, Megumi Matsumoto, Seiichi Tanabe, and Hinako Saeki
3. Love Generation (ラブ ジェネレーション)

=== 1998 ===
1. Glass Mask (Series 2) (ガラスの仮面2) - starring Yumi Adachi, Megumi Matsumoto, Seiichi Tanabe, and Hinako Saeki
2. Great Teacher Onizuka - starring Takashi Sorimachi, Nanako Matsushima, Oguri Shun, and Yōsuke Kubozuka
3. Shomuni, an office lady comedy starring Makiko Esumi
4. Nemureru Mori (A Sleeping Forest), It is written by Nozawa Hisashi, starring Miho Nakayama and Takuya Kimura, and features music by Mariya Takeuchi (Theme song - Camouflage) and U2 (With or Without You).

=== 1999 ===
1. Forbidden Love (魔女の条件, Majo no Jōken) - starring Nanako Matsushima and Hideaki Takizawa
2. Ringu- Saishūshō-

== 2000s ==
=== 2000 ===
1. Beautiful Life - starring Takuya Kimura, Takako Tokiwa, and Koyuki
2. Food Fight - starring Tsuyoshi Kusanagi, Kyoko Fukada, Rie Miyazawa, and Takuya Kimura
3. The 6th Sayoko (六番目の小夜子) - starring Suzuki Anne, Chiaki Kuriyama, Takayuki Yamada, Ryo Katsuji, and Marika Matsumoto
4. Summer Snow - starring Tsuyoshi Domoto, Ryōko Hirosue, Tsubasa Imai, Ikewaki Chizuru, and Oguri Shun
5. Aikotoba wa Yūki - starring Kōji Yakusho, Shingo Katori, Kyōka Suzuki, Akira Terao, Jun Kunimura, Kōichi Yamadera, and Zen Kajiwara
6. Ikebukuro West Gate Park (池袋ウエストゲートパーク) - starring Tomoya Nagase, Ai Kato, Yamashita Tomohisa, Ken Watanabe, Satoshi Tsumabuki, Yōsuke Kubozuka, Shun Oguri, and Koyuki
7. Trick (トリック)- starring Yukie Nakama, Hiroshi Abe

=== 2001 ===
1. Ashita ga Arusa - starring Masatoshi Hamada, Izumi Inamori, Takashi Fujii, Shozo Endo and Naoki Tanaka, and Hitoshi Matsumoto
2. Hero - starring Takuya Kimura, Takako Matsu, and Hiroshi Abe
3. Strawberry on the Shortcake (ストロベリー・オンザ・ショートケーキ) - starring Hideaki Takizawa, Kyoko Fukada, Yōsuke Kubozuka, and Rina Uchiyama
4. The Files of Young Kindaichi (Series 3) (金田一少年の事件簿 thirdseason) - starring Matsumoto Jun, Suzuki Anne, Kazue Fukiishi, and Haruka Ayase
5. San nen B-gumi Kinpachi Sensei (Series 6) - starring Tetsuya Takeda, Aya Ueto, Mari Hoshino, Takahisa Masuda, and Shigeaki Kato

=== 2002 ===
1. Artificial Beauty
2. Leave It to the Nurses 4 (ナースのお仕事 4) - starring Arisa Mizuki, Yuki Matsushita, Kazue Itō, Naohito Fujiki, and Yumi Adachi
3. The Other Side of Midnight (真夜中は別の顔) - starring Asaka Seto, Kōji Kikkawa, Koyuki, Toshiyuki Hosokawa, and Tetsuji Tamayama and features music by Miki Imai (Theme song - Hohoemi no hito) and Maaya Sakamoto (Danieru)
4. Morning Musume: Shinshun! Love Stories (モーニング娘。新春! LOVEストーリーズ) - starring Natsumi Abe, Rika Ishikawa, Maki Goto, Ai Takahashi, Risa Niigaki, Makoto Ogawa and Asami Konno
5. Season of the Sun (太陽の季節) - starring Hideaki Takizawa, Ikewaki Chizuru, Yoshinori Okada, Rio Matsumoto, Sousuke Takaoka, Marika Matsumoto, Shugo Oshinari, and Kota Yabu
6. Kids War 4: Zaken na yo (キッズ・ウォー4 〜ざけんなよ〜) - starring Akiko Ikuina, Yosuke Asari, Mao Inoue, Shota Saito, and Keita Saito
7. Sakura (さくら) - starring Shiho Takano, Hiromi Ōta, Asei Kobayashi, Miyoko Asada, and Masami Nagasawa
8. The Long Love Letter - starring Takako Tokiwa, Yōsuke Kubozuka, Takayuki Yamada, Yamashita Tomohisa, and Ren Osugi
9. Kisarazu Cat's Eye (木更津キャッツアイ) - starring Okada Junichi, Sakurai Sho, Okada Yoshinori, Sato Ryuta, and Tsukamoto Takashi
10. Trick 2 (トリック2)- starring Yukie Nakama, Hiroshi Abe

=== 2003 ===
1. Good Luck!! (グッドラック!!) - starring Kimura Takuya and Shibasaki Kou
2. Kimi wa Petto (きみはペット) - starring Koyuki and Matsumoto Jun
3. Boku dake no Madonna (僕だけのマドンナ) - starring Takizawa Hideaki and Hasegawa Kyoko
4. Ōoku (大奥) - starring Miho Kanno, Yuko Asano, Ikewaki Chizuru, Yumi Adachi, Kazuki Kitamura, and Shingo Katsurayama
5. Stand Up!! (スタンドアップ！！) - starring Ninomiya Kazunari, Yamashita Tomohisa, Oguri Shun, Narimiya Hiroki, and Suzuki Anne
6. Pretty Guardian Sailor Moon (美少女戦士セーラームーン) - starring Miyuu Sawai, Rika Izumi, Keiko Kitagawa, Mew Azama, and Ayaka Komatsu
7. Water Boys (ウォーターボーイズ) - starring Yamada Takayuki
8. Shiroi Kyotō（白い巨塔）- starring Toshiaki Karasawa and Yōsuke Eguchi
9. Hotman (ホットマン, Hottoman)- starring Takashi Sorimachi, Akiko Yada, Manami Konishi & Nana Yamauchi
10. Trick 3 (トリック3) - starring Yukie Nakama, Hiroshi Abe

=== 2004 ===
1. Ace wo Nerae! (エースをねらえ!) - starring Aya Ueto and Natsuki Kato
2. Crying Out Love, In the Center of the World (Sekai no Chūshin de Ai wo Sakebu – 世界の中心で、愛をさけぶ) – starring Takayuki Yamada and Haruka Ayase
3. Itoshi Kimi e (愛し君へ) – starring Miho Kanno, Naohito Fujiki, Misaki Ito, Hiroshi Tamaki, and Mirai Moriyama
4. Minami-kun no Koibito (南くんの恋人) – starring Ninomiya Kazunari, Kyoko Fukada, Mao Miyaji, and Seiichi Tanabe
5. Orange Days (オレンジデイズ) - starring Satoshi Tsumabuki, Kou Shibasaki, and Eita
6. Pride (プライド) - starring Takuya Kimura and Yūko Takeuchi

== 2010s ==
=== 2010 ===
- Q1 2010
1. Magerarenai Onna - starring Miho Kanno, Hiromi Nagasaku, Shosuke Tanihara and Mayumi Asaka
2. Perfect Girl Evolution - starring Kazuya Kamenashi, Aya Ōmasa, Seishiro Kato and Ranko Kanbe
3. Code Blue 2 - starring Tomohisa Yamashita, Yui Aragaki, Yosuke Asari and Erika Toda
- Q2 - Q3 2020
1. Asu no Hikari o Tsukame
2. Yamato Nadeshiko Shichi Henge
3. Mother

=== 2014 ===
1. Saigo Kara Nibanme no Koi
2. Yowakutemo Katemasu
3. Dear Sister
4. Water Polo Yankees
5. Massan

=== 2016 ===
1. Specialist, starring Tsuyoshi Kusanagi and Natsuna Watanabe
2. Never Let Me Go, starring Haruka Ayase, Haruma Miura, Asami Mizukawa
3. Love Song, starring Masaharu Fukuyama, Sakura Fujiwara, Masaki Suda
4. Kazoku no Katachi, starring Shingo Katori, Kiko Mizuhara, and Juri Ueno
5. Love That Makes You Cry, starring Kasumi Arimura, Mitsuki Takahata, Takahiro Nishijima and Kentaro Sakaguchi
- Summer（July）
1. House Selling Lady, starring Keiko Kitagawa, Tōru Nakamura and Yuko Araki
2. Girl Who Takes Time, starring Yuina Kuroshima, Fuma Kikuchi and Ryoma Takeuchi
3. Hope: Kitai Zero no Shinnyu Shain, starring Yuto Nakajima, Mizuki Yamamoto and Masaki Kaji
4. And, There Were None
5. Suki na Hito ga Iru Koto, starring Mirei Kiritani, Kento Yamazaki, Shohei Miura, and Shūhei Nomura

=== 2017 ===
- January
1. Tokyo Tarareba Musume
- October
1. Kounodori

=== 2018 ===
1. City Hunter
- January
1. Kuragehime
- April
1. Hana Nochi Hare ~HanaDan Next Season~
2. Black Forceps (Season 1, 2018)
- October
1. Descending Stories: Showa Genroku Rakugo Shinju

=== 2019 ===
- January
1. Return of House Selling Lady - starring Keiko Kitagawa, Tōru Nakamura
2. Good Wife - starring Takako Tokiwa, Kotaro Koizumi, Toshiaki Karasawa
- Summer（July）
1. Voice 110 HQ - starring Toshiaki Karasawa, Yoko Maki
- October
1. Sherlock: Untold Stories - starring Dean Fujioka, Takanori Iwata, Kuranosuke Sasaki

== 2020s ==
=== 2020 ===
- January
1. Absolute Zero-Criminal Undercover Investigation (S4)
- June
1. 2020 May's Love
- Summer（July）
1. Detective Novice - starring Kento Nakajima, Sho Hirano, Michiko Kichise, Yusuke Iseya, and Taizo Harada
2. Hanzawa Naoki 2020 - starring Masato Sakai, Mitsuhiro Oikawa, Kento Kaku, Teruyuki Kagawa, Arata Furuta and Akira Emoto
3. Suits Season 2 - starring Yuji Oda, Yuto Nakajima, Yuko Araki, Anne Nakamura, Shinya Kote, Honami Suzuki, and Kōtarō Yoshida
- December
1. Alice in Borderland

=== 2021 ===
- April
1. Nemesis (TV Series)
- October
1. The Men of the Wada Family

=== 2022 ===
- January
1. My Neighbor, Chikara
2. The 13 Lords of the Shogun
- April
1. My family

=== 2023 ===
- January
1. Romance 101
2. Captured Hospital
3. What Will You Do, Ieyasu?
- July
1. Vivant
- October
1. Kyō Kara Hitman
2. One Day: Wonderful Christmas Ado

=== 2024 ===
- January
1. Captured New Airport
- July
1. Laughing Matryoshka
2. Black Forceps (Season 2, 2024)
- October
1. Light of my Lion

== See also ==
- List of BL dramas
