= Daisuke Hinata =

- Born: July 2, 1956 (age 70); Tokyo, Japan
- Genres: J-POP Techno-Pop R&B
- Occupation: Music producer ・ composer ・keyboardist ・ synthesist ・ synthesizer programmer ・ recording engineer ・studio designer
- Instrument: Keyboard ・ synthesizer ・ piano
- Years active: 1982–present
- Labels: HYPER & GLOBAL DISC Records https://hyperdisc.com/
- Website: https://www.daisukehinata.com/

Daisuke Hinata (born July 2, 1956) is a Japanese music producer, composer, keyboardist, synthesist, synthesizer programmer, recording engineer, and studio designer. He is the owner/producer of VSA Studio, a recording studio located in California, US. He is also the owner of the record label “Hyperdisc” and "Global Disc".

His older brother is Toshifumi Hinata, also a music composer and producer.

== Life and career ==
Hinata was born in Ota-ku, Tokyo. After graduating from Gakushuin University, he studied at Berklee College of Music and Electronic music.

In 1986, his techno-pop band "Interiors" participated in the omnibus album "Windham Hill Records Sampler '86". The song "Hot Beach" from this album was nominated for a Grammy Award in the New Age Producer Artist category. After that, he produced for artists such as Tetsuya Komuro, Takako Matsu, and moved to Los Angeles in 1990.

In 1996, he composed and produced the soundtrack for the TV drama "Long Vacation" with his unit "CAGNET," which sold 1.5 million copies. Other projects include soundtracks for the TV dramas "Love Generation," “Love Story," and "Three Sisters Detectives," and tohko, co-produced by Tetsuya Komuro.

In 1998, he won the Best Foreign Album Award, as well as the Gold Disc and Platinum Disc Awards in Hong Kong, and in 1999, he produced the soundtrack for the film "King of Comedy," which received much attention in Hong Kong, Taiwan, Malaysia, and Singapore.

In the U.S., he released CAGNET's "Groove Radio" on EMI nationwide in the two years from 1998. Also he released six Cuban music series, which won the Best World Album Award from the American music magazine "New Age Voice" in April 1999.

In 2016, he and Tetsuya Komuro performed with The Chemical Brothers at Yokohama Arena.

In 2019, a remake of "The New King of Comedy," re-teaming with Stephen Chow for the first time in over 20 years.

In 2020, Yellow Magic Orchestra, Haruomi Hosono, Ryuichi Sakamoto, and Joe Hisaishi were featured in the compilation album Kankyo Ongaku: Japanese Ambient, Environmental & New Age Music 1980–1990, which is composed of Japanese ambient music, environmental music, and new age music. The album was nominated for the Grammy Award for Best Historical Album, as it included songs from "Interiors".

== Career and life events ==
- 1983: Jointly with his brother, established the private office "AVR Corporation" and the recording studio "STUDIO AVR" in Tokyo.
- 1986: Nominated for a Grammy Award in the New Age Producer/Artist category for "Hot Beach" by his unit "Interiors" composed by Daisuke Hinata.
- 1987: Became the chief executive producer of "STUDIO AVR.”
- 1989: Introduced the Synclavier, a pioneering digital synthesizer.
- 1990: Established "VSA STUDIO" within Skywalker Sound in California and became its owner/producer. Relocated to Los Angeles, USA.
- 1995: Founded the independent label “hyperdisc records” and “Global Disc Records” in Santa Monica. The labels were established to release music independently, avoiding the constraints of major record companies. The label also operated a CD store and coffee shop of the same name, hosting weekly amateur performances and open auditions, where winners could record and release their work.
- 1997: Established the indie label SAPPHIRECORDS.
- 2003: Signed an exclusive contract with "T.O.S. Inc.," a subsidiary of the cell phone website production company "Magical i-Land," to provide songs for Chaku-Uta.
- 2011: Produced Nenna Yvonne Japan Tour
- 2012: Created music for Matsuki Matsushima Collection Summer 2012 in Paris
- 2013: Formed the rock band Encounter, featuring Daisuke Hinata on keyboards and talk box, Carrie Suzuki on lead vocals and flute, Kaz Sakurayama on guitar, Jackson Suyama on drums, and Fuminori Ikeba as DJ and VJ.
- 2016: Performed with Tetsuya Komuro and The Chemical Brothers at Yokohama Arena.
- 2019: Re-teamed with Stephen Chow for the first time in over 20 years, collaborating on the remake of "The New King of Comedy.”
- His song "Candy Kisses" was performed by Karen Mok at Last Concert Tour
- 2020: Released the Grammy-nominated compilation album "Kankyo Ongaku: Japanese Ambient, Environmental & New Age Music 1980–1990," which features songs from "Interiors." The compilation was nominated for a Grammy Award in the "Best Historical Album" category and includes "Chaconne"-” by his older brother, Toshifumi Hinata.
- 2023: Released vinyl "Long Vacation", "Love Generation", "Here We Again", and "WWW".
- His song "Here We Are Again" was licensed for Chinese Variety Show "Trump Card VS Trump Card”
- 2024: Released vinyl worldwide "Sculpture of Time" composed by Interior commissioned for Nils-Udo by WRWTFWW a record label based in Geneva, Switzerland.
- Released vinyl worldwide "Tarsanland" from the same level WRWTFWW.
- His song for NILS-UDO was licensed for the LOEVE in Spain.
- 2025: Performed opening live at DIG Shibuya DG Drone Show.

== Production philosophy and collaborations ==
Although he employs state-of-the-art digital audio workstations for recording, he intentionally uses analog equipment for the finishing touches. His goal is to create a sound that maintains its quality even on inexpensive speakers, especially when a newcomer's track is played on the radio. He says, “Among the many hit songs with gimmicks to surprise listeners, I find the most satisfaction when my plain melodies, which reflect my true calling, are praised.”

Tetsuya Komuro has remarked, "He has an excellent sense when selecting the studio musicians involved in the recording process, and the people Daisuke chooses always seem to be a great fit. He also possesses a keen ability to make other important judgments with the same sharpness." Komuro further adds, "Daisuke-san taught me many things, such as how to use the Synclavier, how to communicate with American musicians, how to arrange the staff, and how to organize sounds as a music producer." Toshifumi Hinata also holds him in high regard, stating, “He is a junior colleague of mine, and we share the same philosophy—that pop music should be created with careful consideration of market trends.”

tohko, a singer he has worked with, shares, "Before I begin singing, he meticulously decides on the musical score and provides personalized voice training. He guides me to produce high notes effortlessly, so I never have to worry about hitting them."

== Discography ==
=== Music group ===
- Interiors
- Interior
- CAGNET
- T.C.D Hits – Produced and performed by Tetsuya Komuro, Coji Kubo, and Daisuke Hinata, and produced the soundtrack for Hit Factory's "Hatachi no Yakusoku" in 1992.
- MATRIX – A musical unit consisting of Daisuke Hinata and Akio Akashi that released the promo single "Anything You Want" in 1994 and the album of the same name in 1995.
- Space Junkies
- encounter

=== Solo albums ===
- 1989: "Tarzanland"
- 2001: "OASIS Resort Music Series MIAMI"
- 2007: "Organic Style Daisuke Hinata AKA CAGNET the BEST"

=== Single ===
- 1989: Rie Miyazawa "Dream Rush" Composed by TK
- 1990: Minako Tanaka "Yumemite Try" Composed by TK
- 1994: Matrix "Anything You Want"
- 1994: PATA "FLY AWAY"
- 1995: PATA "Shine on me"
- 1996: SECTION-S "Little by Little"
- 1996: CAGNET "Sobani Iteyo”
- 1996: CAGNET "Deeper and Deeper"
- 1996: CAGNET "Switching Back and Forth Again"
- 1996: SECTION-S "ON AND ON"
- 1996: SECTION-S "It’s ALL RIGHT"
- 1997: CAGNET "Rage in the Sky"
- 1997: Takako Matsu "Ashita Haruga Kitara"
- 1997: SECTION-S "Adballoon"
- 1997: Takako Matsu "I STAND ALONE"
- 1997: Takako Matsu "WIND SONG”
- 1997: Marysisa "CRAZY”
- 1997: meo "True True"
- 1997: CAGNET "Deeper and Deeper Remix"
- 1998: tohko "BAD LUCK ON LOVE 〜BLUES ON LIFE〜"
- 1998: MaMi "WITH"
- 1998: tohko "LOOP na Kimochi"”
- 1998: MaMi "million"
- 1998: chez vous "Kitto Itsuka"”
- 1999: tohko"WHO..."
- 1999: Spark "Doin' It"
- 1999: Spark "My Wonderful Days..."
- 2000: Spark "Light Up The Future"
- 2000: Spark "Jellyfish"
- 2001: Spark "Wild Child"
- 2001: Spark "Ageha / Destiny"
- 2005: Jade & Steve I. "I Wish One Time"
- 2006: Jade & Steve I. "remember ~Sena no Piano"”
- 2006: Jade & Steve I. "SHINE on me"
- 2007: Jade "True True"
- 2009: WILL "Listen to Your Heart feat. Jade”
- 2009: Jade "Beautiful Life"
- 2009: Jade "Merry Christmas to You"
- 2010: Jade "Listen to Your Heart"
- 2010: Will featuring UTSU "Pankuro"”
- 2011: Nenna Yvonne "Kuru Kuru 360"

=== Album ===
- 1984: Naomi Akimoto "Suisaiga”
- 1985: BRONX "EASTER ～魔帝聖還～”
- 1986: Naomi Akimoto "Portrait”
- 1987: Naomi Akimoto"Split finger first lady”
- 1987: SHADY DOLLS "BLOW YOUR MIND”
- 1987: THE BRONX "Kotetsu no Arashi ～ON THE STEEL BREEZE～”
- 1988: Atsushi Yokozeki "BRILLIANT PICTURES”
- 1989: ZIGGY "NICE & EASY”
- 1989: Toru Suzuki "Sabaku no Nettaigyo”
- 1989: Tetsuya Komuro "Digitalian is eating breakfast”
- 1990: Tetsuya Komuro "Heaven and Earth SOUNDTRACK”
- 1990: Tetsuya Komuro "Psychic Entertainment Sound”
- 1992: Toshifumi Hinata "Ai to Iu Nano Motoni" “愛という名のもとに”
- 1993: PATA "PATA”
- 1995: Matrix "Anything You Want”
- 1995: PATA "Raised on rock”
- 1996: Nanaco "Love Is A Drug”
- 1996: CAGNET "Long Vacation”
- 1996: CAGNET "Here We Are Again”
- 1996: CAGNET "Long Vacation Original Soundtrack Special Box”
- 1996: SECTION-S "www.”
- 1997: Takako Matsu "Sora no Kagami”
- 1997: CAGNET "Groove Radio”
- 1997: CAGNET "Love Generation Original Soundtrack”
- 1998: Marysia "Lucky Star”
- 1998: yasue "Cosmic Pandora”
- 1998: tohko "Tohko”
- 1998: CAGNET "Best of Cagnet World”
- 1998: CAGNET "File of Justice Original Soundtrack”
- 1999: Rebellious Generation "Until The Day Has Come”
- 1999: CAGNET "King of Comedy Original Soundtrack”
- 1999: TOHKO "cure”
- 1999: yasue "LAKTIA”
- 1999 Ho Hsigna-Ting "Summer Time”
- 2001: Kunihiko Murai "A TASTE OF BLUE Resort Music Series COTE D’AZUR”
- 2001: CAGNET "Love Story Original Soundtrack”
- 2003: Yuu Tatsugawa "Deep Breath”
- 2003: JAPAN BLOOD "JET☆STORM”
- 2005: Jade & Steve I. "Jade & Steve I.”
- 2005: Jade & Steve I. "Lounge Hip Hop”
- 2007: FETISH the WORLD "Walking in the Rain”
- 2008: Jade & Steve I. "BEST of Lounge Hip Hop”
- 2009: Jade "Best Friend”

=== Compilation ===
- 1983: "Yen Manifold Vol. 1”
- 1997: "SOUNDS OF SANTA MONICA”
- 1998: "Rhythm & Smoke: Cuba Sessions”
- 1999: “Songs From Heart of Cuba”
- 1999: "Cubamania”
- 1999: "Cantinero De Cuba”
- 2000: "Havana Now: Havana Sessions”
- 2000: “Havana Now Presents: Brisas De Habana”
- 2002: “Ethnic Escape: Cuban Celebration”
- 2002: “HAVANA HEAT”
- 2002: “HAVANA BREEZE”
- 2007: “Sounds from the All Asia Pass”

=== Vinyl ===
- 2023: "Long Vacation"
- 2023: "love Generation"
- 2023: "Here We Are Again”
- 2024: "Sculpture of Time”
- 2024: "Tarzanland”

=== Television Drama ===
- 1996: "Long Vacation”
- 1997: "Love Generation”
- 1998: "女教師”
- 1998: "三姉妹探偵団”
- 2001: "Love Story”

=== Movie ===
- 1999: "King of Comedy"
- 2019: "新喜劇王"

=== Commercial ===
Honda Motor, Toyota Motor, Hitachi, Kirin Beverage, Calpis, Yamaha, Sega Saturn, NEC, Suntory, etc...

=== Other participating works ===
Provided music, arranged music, participated in recording, etc.

- 1984: Junko Kudo, "Akaneiro no Carnival" (arranger and synthesizer performance)
- 1988: Tokyo Government Office (Main Lobby Music production)
- 1989: "STAND by Me" (Theater music)
- 1990: Yoko Minamino "Gather" (arranger of "Utsumikakegen")
- 1990: OVA "CAROL" (sound collaboration)
- 1990: TMN "RHYTHM RED TMN TOUR" (Synclavier system plan)
- 1991: FENCE OF DEFENSE "digitaglam FOD VI" (Synclavier operator and recording engineer)
- 1991: Bobby Caldwell Live in Tokyo Laserdisc
- 1992: Michael Jackson "Dangerous Tour" (sound effects programming)
- 1993: TED 4 Kobe – Entertainment Music Production with Herbie Hancok attended by Bill Gates, Steve Jobs, Akio Morita.
- 1994: Hexagon Film (Canal +, France) (logo music)
- 1995: Ayabe Astronomy Museum, Kyoto, Japan (high definition video music)
- 1997: Hi Vision Digital Network Live, Tokyo-Los Angeles (music producer)
- 2003: Jobutsu Project "LIGHT IS BEAUTIFUL" (Composed, arranged, mixed, and sang "AI <Ai>" by Junko Yamamoto)
- 2007: Junko Yamamoto "SONGS" (Arranged and produced "Tsubasa wo Kudasai")
- 2009: Dojo-T "Mou Ichido… feat. BENI" (music source license)

== Representative music ==
- 1996: CAGNET "Close to You ~ Sena's Piano II"
- 1997: Takako Matsu "Ashita Haruga Kitara"
- 1998: tohko "BAD LUCK ON LOVE 〜BLUES ON LIFE〜"

== Related persons ==
- Hinata Toshifumi
- Hideki Nonaka
- Testuya Komuro
- Jade
