= BG Personal Bodyguard =

2018 Japanese television series

Japanese name
- Kanji: 身辺警護人
- Genre: crime drama
- Written by: Yumiko Inoue
- Country of origin: Japan
- Original language: Japanese
- No. of episodes: 9

Original release
- Network: TV Asahi
- Release: January 18, 2018

BG Personal Bodyguard (Japanese: 身辺警護人, BG Shinpen Keigonin) is a Japanese television crime drama series starring Takuya Kimura and written by Yumiko Inoue. It aired first in January 2018 on TV Asahi. The second season was originally to start running in April 2020, however was delayed till 18 June 2020.

== Synopsis ==
Shimazaki Akira is divorced and lives with his teenage son. He used to work as a personal bodyguard but had since left the industry after an accident occurred in which his soccer superstar client was injured. He now works as a security guard at a construction site. The private security company (Hinode Security Service/HSS) he works for is setting up a new bodyguard division. Without telling his manager about the past, Akira Shimazaki starts working as a novice bodyguard.

== Broadcast ==
The first episode was broadcast on January 18, 2018, in Japan. It was also aired at the same month by Wakuwaku Japan in several Asian countries including Indonesia, Mongolia, Myanmar, Singapore, Sri Lanka and Taiwan. The first episode received a viewer rating of 15.7%.

== Cast ==
Actor	Role
Takuya Kimura (木村拓哉)	Akira Shimazaki (島崎章)
Shinnosuke Abe	Harutaka Kiyota (清田治孝)
Yōsuke Eguchi (江口洋介)	Yoshiaki Ochiai (落合義明)
Yuriko Ishida	Aiko Tachihara (立原愛子)
Takaya Kamikawa	Goro Murata (村田五郎)
Shotaro Mamiya	Seitaro Sawaguchi (沢口清太郎)
Shinnosuke Mitsushima	Junya Kono (河野純也)
Toshiyuki Nagashima	Shigenobu Imazeki
Nanao	Mayu Suganuma (菅沼まゆ)
Takumi Saitoh	Masaya Takanashi (高梨雅也)
Kanau Tanaka	Shun Shimazaki (島崎瞬)
Takashi Ukaji	Osamu Hikawa
Tomoko Yamaguchi (山口智子)	Hitomi Odagiri (小田切仁美)

== Special appearances ==
Tomoko Yamaguchi, who previously appeared alongside Takuya Kimura in the 1996 drama Long Vacation, appears in season 1 episodes 6 and 7 as the ex-wife of Akira Shimazaki.

Nene Otsuka, who previously appeared alongside Takuya Kimura in the 2001 drama Hero (2001 TV series), appears in season 1 episode 2.

Masanobu Katsumura, who previously appeared alongside Takuya Kimura in the 2001 drama Hero (2001 TV series), appears in season 2.
