= The Smile Has Left Your Eyes (TV series) =

2018 South Korean television series

- Promotional poster
- Also known as: Falling Stars
- Hangul: 하늘에서 내리는 일억개의 별
- Lit.: Hundred Million Stars From the Sky
- RR: Haneureseo naerineun ireokgaeui byeol
- MR: Hanŭresŏ naerinŭn irŏkkaeŭi pyŏl
- Genre: Mystery; Thriller
- Based on: Sora Kara Furu Ichioku no Hoshi by Eriko Kitagawa
- Developed by: Studio Dragon
- Written by: Song Hye-jin
- Directed by: Yoo Je-won
- Starring: Seo In-guk; Jung So-min; Park Sung-woong
- Country of origin: South Korea
- Original language: Korean
- No. of episodes: 16

Production
- Executive producers: Choi Jin-hee; Kim Jin-yi; Satoshi Kubota; Park Ji-young
- Producers: Kim Seong-min; Lee Se-hee
- Production companies: Fuji Television; Studio Dragon; The Unicorn

Original release
- Network: tvN
- Release: October 3 – November 22, 2018

The Smile Has Left Your Eyes (Korean: 하늘에서 내리는 일억개의 별) is a 2018 South Korean television series starring Seo In-guk, Jung So-min and Park Sung-woong. It is a remake of the 2002 Japanese television series Sora Kara Furu Ichioku no Hoshi. It aired on tvN from October 3 to November 22, 2018 every Wednesday and Thursday at 21:30 (KST).

== Synopsis ==
This 2018 Korean drama revolves around Kim Moo-young - a complex, mysterious man with a forgotten past. He meets and falls in love with Yoo Jin-kang, and although her initial impression of him is pretty negative, later she discovers that Moo-young is innocent and struggling to recognize about his past life. However, her older brother, Yoo Jin-gook, a homicide detective, suspects that Moo-young is more sinister than he lets on, oblivious to the fact that he is the key to both Moo-young and Jin-kang's intertwined history. The situation becomes more complicated when Moo-young regains his memories which leads him to find the truth about his father's death and more.

== Cast ==
=== Main ===
- Seo In-guk as Kim Moo-young

An assistant in a craft microbrewery. He is indifferent on the surface, yet has a childlike innocence in him.

- Jung So-min as Yoo Jin-kang

An advertisement designer who lost her parents in an accident when she was young, and underwent diverse growing pains.

- Park Sung-woong as Yoo Jin-gook

Yoo Jin-kang's brother who has been a homicide detective for 27 years.

=== Supporting ===
==== People around Kim Moo-young ====
- Go Min-si as Im Yoo-ri

A girl whose suicide was prevented by Moo-young.

- Yoo Jae-myung as Yang Kyung-mo

A psychiatrist.

- Kim Ji-hyun as Jang Se-ran

==== People around Yoo Jin-kang ====
- Seo Eun-soo as Baek Seung-ah

A daughter of a rich family involved in the distribution industry.

- Do Sang-woo as Jang Woo-sung

Baek Seung-ah's boyfriend.

==== People around Yoo Jin-gook ====
- Jang Young-nam as Tak So-jung
- Kwon Soo-hyun as Eom Cho-rong

==== People of Arts Brewery ====
- Lee Hong-bin as No Hee-joon
- Min Woo-hyuk as CEO Jung Sang-yoon
- Kim Kyung-il as Brew Master / Kil Hyung-joo

==== Won Young Police Station ====
- Choi Byung-mo as Lee Kyung-cheol
- Kim Seo-kyung as Hwang Gun
- ?? as Jo Ki-joo
- Han Sa-myung as Lee Jae-min

==== People of Design lux ====
- Park Min-jung as CEO Hwang
- Lee Ji-min as Assistant Manager Im

=== Others ===
- Lee Ji-ha as Nun Lucy
- Han Da-sol as Shin Yoo-jin

== Production ==
In April 2017, it was reported that tvN will be including a Korean remake of Sora Kara Furu Ichioku no Hoshi as part of its drama lineup for the second half of 2017. In May 2017, tvN confirmed the production of the remake, which will be directed by Yoo Je-won.

Seo and Jung were announced as the leads in June 2018, and Park's casting was confirmed in July 2018.

The first script reading took place in early July 2018 at Sangam DDMC, Sangam-dong, Seoul.

The series was originally scheduled to premiere on September 26, 2018 but was delayed by a week.

== Original soundtrack ==
The Smile Has Left Your Eyes OST

Soundtrack album by Various Artists
- Recorded: 2018
- Studio: TONE Studio
- Genre: Soundtrack
- Languages: Korean; English
- Label: Genie Music

=== Part 1 ===
Released on October 25, 2018
No.	Title	Lyrics	Music	Artists	Length
1.	"Someday"	Ha Hyun-sang	Ha Hyun-sang	Yi Sung-yol	4:26
2.	"Someday" (Inst.)		Ha Hyun-sang		4:26
Total length:					8:52

=== Part 2 ===
Released on November 8, 2018
No.	Title	Lyrics	Music	Artists	Length
1.	"Star (별, 우리)"	Seo In-guk, Jung So-min	UK, Jung Su-min	Seo In-guk, Jung So-min	4:15
2.	"Star" (Inst.)		UK, Jung Su-min		4:15
Total length:					8:30

=== Part 3 ===
Released on November 15, 2018
No.	Title	Lyrics	Music	Artists	Length
1.	"Lost"	Lee Rae-eon, Realmeee	Lee Rae-eon, Realmeee	Ahn Ji-yeon	4:31
2.	"Lost" (Inst.)		Lee Rae-eon, Realmeee		4:31
Total length:					9:02

=== Part 4 ===
Released on November 22, 2018
No.	Title	Lyrics	Music	Artists	Length
1.	"Moonlight"	Kako, Curtis F	Kako, Curtis F	Gu Yoon-hoe	3:47
2.	"Moonlight" (Inst.)		Kako, Curtis F		3:47
Total length:					7:34

== Viewership ==
The Smile Has Left Your Eyes : South Korea viewers per episode (thousands)

Season	Episode number																Average
Season	1	2	3	4	5	6	7	8	9	10	11	12	13	14	15	16	Average
1	896	656	674	690	804	600	590	582	583	427	525	505	478	495	569	656	608

Source: Audience measurement performed nationwide by Nielsen Media Research.

Average TV viewership ratings
Ep.	Original broadcast date	Average audience share (Nielsen Korea)	
Ep.	Original broadcast date	Nationwide	Seoul
1	October 3, 2018	3.996% (2nd)	4.839% (1st)
2	October 4, 2018	3.212% (1st)	3.717% (1st)
3	October 10, 2018	2.988% (2nd)	3.407% (2nd)
4	October 11, 2018	3.046% (3rd)	3.644% (2nd)
5	October 17, 2018	3.410% (2nd)	4.064% (2nd)
6	October 18, 2018	2.803% (3rd)	3.324% (3rd)
7	October 24, 2018	2.812% (5th)	3.160% (5th)
8	October 25, 2018	2.661% (3rd)	2.902% (3rd)
9	October 31, 2018	2.556% (3rd)	3.188% (3rd)
10	November 1, 2018	2.289% (4th)	2.758% (3rd)
11	November 7, 2018	2.693% (2nd)	2.945% (2nd)
12	November 8, 2018	2.602% (2nd)	3.268% (2nd)
13	November 14, 2018	2.346% (2nd)	2.750% (2nd)
14	November 15, 2018	2.387% (3rd)	2.999% (3rd)
15	November 21, 2018	2.841% (2nd)	3.378% (2nd)
16	November 22, 2018	3.375% (2nd)	4.202% (1st)
Average		2.876%	3.409%
In the table above, the blue numbers represent the lowest ratings and the red numbers represent the highest ratings.; This series aired on a cable channel/pay TV which normally has a relatively smaller audience compared to free-to-air TV/public broadcasters (KBS, SBS, MBC and EBS).
