= Engine (TV series) =

- エンジン
- Starring: Takuya Kimura; Koyuki; Yoshio Harada; Yuki Matsushita
- Opening theme: "I Can See Clearly Now" (Jimmy Cliff)
- Country of origin: Japan
- Original language: Japanese
- No. of episodes: 11

Original release
- Network: Fuji TV
- Release: 18 April – 27 June 2005

Engine (エンジン, Enjin) is a Japanese television drama series from Fuji Television, first shown in Japan from 18 April to 27 June 2005.

== Plot ==
Kanzaki Jiro (Takuya Kimura) (who used to be a star driver back in Japan) is a backup F3000 driver in Europe. During a practice run, he accidentally crashes into his first driver and loses his job. No other club in Europe would hire him as he is deemed too old for the sports. He has no choice but to return to Japan to his previous racing team. Unfortunately, the team now has a better and younger driver, and feels Jiro has nothing more to contribute to the team, and do not want him back.

He goes back to stay with his foster father and sister, and finds out his foster father has converted their home into an orphanage for unfortunate children whose parents are unable to take care of them. Tomomi Sensei (Koyuki), is a newly hired caregiver at the orphanage. She is not popular with the children as she does not seem to understand their feelings and makes misguided attempts to help them. Jiro, on the other hand, was an orphan himself, and being a big kid at heart is able to click with the children.

Despite the fact that Jiro hates children and is more interested in getting back into racing than helping out at the orphanage, he nonetheless agrees to be the orphanage's driver in exchange for being allowed to live there.

== Cast ==
- Takuya Kimura as Jiro Kanzaki (神崎 次郎)
- Koyuki as Tomomi Mizukoshi (水越朋美)
- Masato Sakai as Genichiro Torii (鳥居元一郎)
- Yuki Matsushita as Chihiro Kanzaki (神崎ちひろ)
- Yoshio Harada as Takeshi Kanzaki (神崎猛)
- Shigeru Izumiya as Chinsaku Ichinose (一之瀬新作)
- Aya Okamoto as Tamaki Suenaga (末永たまき)
- Shinsuke Aoki as Hiroto Sugawara (菅原比呂人)

The Children of Kaze no Oka Home

- Ueno Juri as Hoshino Misae (星野美冴)
- Erika Toda as Hida Harumi
- Indou Kaho as Ninomiya Yukie (二宮ユキエ)
- Houshi Ishida as Shioya Daisuke
- Natsumi Ohira as Taguchi Nao
- Daiki Arioka as Sonobe Toru
- Yuto Nakajima as Kusama Shuhei
- Kosugi Moichiro as Hirayama Morio
- Sato Miku as Sonobe Aoi
- Hirota Ryohei as Tone Akira
- Komuro Yuta as Kanemura Shunta
- Kitagawa Ayumi as Komori Nanae

== Ratings ==
In the tables below, the blue numbers represent the lowest ratings and the red numbers represent the highest ratings.

Episode #	Original broadcast date	Kanton region
1	April 18, 2005	25.3%
2	April 25, 2005	22.5%
3	May 2, 2005	19.6%
4	May 2, 2005	23.1%
5	May 9, 2005	22.3%
6	May 16, 2005	21.5%
7	May 23, 2005	22.2%
8	June 6, 2005	21.5%
9	June 13, 2005	21.8%
10	June 20, 2005	22.5%
11	June 27, 2005	24.3%
Average		22.4%
