= Han Da-sol =

South Korean actress (born 1995)

- Born: 13 May 1995 (age 31); South Korea
- Other name: Handa-sol
- Education: Korea National University of Arts (Theater Academy and Bachelor of Acting)
- Occupation: Actress
- Years active: 2012–present
- Agent: Prain Global
- Known for: Happiness; Men Are Men; The Smile Has Left Your Eyes

Han Da-sol is a South Korean actress. She is known for her roles in dramas such as Men Are Men, Twelve Nights, The Smile Has Left Your Eyes, and Happiness. She also appeared in movies Hot Young Bloods, The Mayor, and Dragon Inn Part 2: The Night of the Gods.

== Filmography ==
=== Television series ===
Year	Title	Role	Ref.
2018	The Smile Has Left Your Eyes	Shin Yoo-jin	
2018	Twelve Nights	Cheon Da-young	
2018	Memories of the Alhambra	Gamer	
2019	Mother of Mine	Jeong So-hee	
2019	Welcome 2 Life	In Na-rae	
2019	Melting Me Softly	Ma Dong-joo	
2019	The Tale of Nokdu	Hang-ah	
2020	Men Are Men	Kim Da-eun	
2021	Happiness	Lee Bo-ram	
2022	Dr. Park's Clinic	Yoon-ji	
2023	All The Liquors	Kim Yun-ah	
2024	Bitch X Rich	Oh Shi-eun	

=== Film ===
Year	Title	Role
2014	Hot Young Bloods	Bicyclist
2017	The Mayor	Yang Camp Media Team
2021	Dragon Inn Part 2: The Night of the Gods	Eun-young
2023	Ungnami	Yoo Min-joo
2024	All the Liquors	Kim Yun-ah

=== Music video appearances ===
Year	Title	Artist	Length	Ref.
2012	"Don't Forget Me"	AshGray	3:45	
2017	"How Are You?"	Seo Dong-hoon	4:00	
2022	"Apgujeong Rodeo"	HuhGak	4:07	
