= Sora Kara Furu Ichioku no Hoshi =

- Also known as: Hundred Million Stars from the Sky
- Written by: Eriko Kitagawa
- Starring: Takuya Kimura; Akashiya Sanma; Fukatsu Eri; Shibasaki Kou
- Country of origin: Japan
- Original language: Japanese
- No. of episodes: 11

Production
- Running time: 52 min. each episode

Original release
- Network: Fuji TV
- Release: April 15 – June 24, 2002

Hundred Million Stars from the Sky (空から降る一億の星; Sora Kara Furu Ichioku no Hoshi) is a drama that aired on Fuji TV. It first aired in Japan from April 15, 2002 to June 24, 2002 every Wednesday. It features music by Elvis Costello (SMILE - main theme song).

== Cast ==
- Kimura Takuya as Katase Ryo
- Akashiya Sanma as Dojima Kanzo
- Fukatsu Eri as Dojima Yuko
- Igawa Haruka as Nishihara Miwa
- Shibasaki Kou as Miyashita Yuki
- Tayama Ryosei as Osawa Takashi
- Hanmi Kazuaki as Hnazawa
- Morishita Aiko as Sugita Kotoko

== Remake ==
A South Korean remake of the series, titled The Smile Has Left Your Eyes (Hangul: 하늘에서 내리는 일억개의 별; Hanja: Haneureseo Naerineun Ireokgaeui Byeol; lit. Hundred Million Stars From the Sky) aired on tvN from 3 October to 22 November 2018.
