= Good Luck!! =

- Genre: Drama, romance, comedy
- Directed by: Nobuhiro Doi
- Starring: Takuya Kimura; Shinichi Tsutsumi; Kō Shibasaki; Hitomi Kuroki
- Ending theme: Ride on Time by Tatsuro Yamashita (1980)
- Country of origin: Japan
- Original language: Japanese
- No. of episodes: 10

Production
- Producers: Hiroki Ueda; Katsuaki Setoguchi
- Production company: TBS

Original release
- Network: JNN (TBS)
- Release: 19 January – 23 March 2003

Good Luck!! (グッドラック！！) is a 2003 Japanese television drama starring Takuya Kimura. The story revolves around an up-and-coming pilot, Hajime Shinkai, and portrays his interactions with others as he progresses along the road to becoming a captain. As is common in many Japanese drama series, it blends drama and romance with comedic elements. This drama also emphasizes hardship of being a pilot or cabin crew, and the serious nature of the industry they're in, which puts thousands of lives in its hands.

== Cast ==
- Takuya Kimura as Hajime Shinkai (新海元)
- Shinichi Tsutsumi as Kazuki Kōda (香田一樹)
- Kō Shibasaki as Ayumi Ogawa (緒川歩実)
- Rina Uchiyama as Urara Fukaura (深浦うらら)
- Naoto Takenaka as Jane Naitō (内藤ジェーン)
- Yasunori Danta as Kenzaburō Ōta (太田健三郎)
- Hitomi Kuroki as Noriko Togashi (富樫のり子)
- Jun Kaname as Takayuki Abe (阿部貴之)
- Yoon Son-ha as Park Mi-suk (朴美淑)

== Key characters ==
- Hajime Shinkai (Takuya Kimura) is the protagonist – a young, inexperienced pilot who earns notoriety among colleagues for disregarding standards and standing up to superiors. Emotional and easily provokable, he has a strong sense of justice and equally strong love of flying.
- Kazuki Kouda (Shinichi Tsutsumi) – a senior captain and chief of flight operations. Known for his very cold, nearly robotic demeanour, he has not tolerance for anything but perfect professional performance to the border of inhumanity. He is feared and disliked by most of the other characters for being very unpleasant and demanding.
- Ayumi Ogawa (Kō Shibasaki) – a stubborn, straight-talking mechanic who is as committed to her job as she is abrasive towards Shinkai. Having lost her parents in a plane crash, she decided to become a plane mechanic to make planes as safe as possible. However, she has a profound fear of flying and has never flown at the start of the series.
- Noriko Togashi (Kuroki Hitomi) – a chief cabin attendant, is committed to the highest professional standards, but at the same time cares for her junior colleagues and compassionately coaches them.
- Kenzaburo Ota (Yasunori Danta) – a senior chief cabin attendant, who can be both serious about his job and the performance of his staff and cheerful and humorous when interacting with pilots. He is a big fan of Shinkai and encourages him in his development, while at the same time displaying much dislike for Kouda behind his back.
- Urara Fukaura (Rina Uchiyama) – a very junior flight attendant who only chose the job for its apparent glamour and ostensibly does not want to pursue this career path, but is using the opportunity to find a husband quickly. She does not treat her job seriously and oftentimes behaves unprofessionally, which earns her scolding from other crew members. She is brash and cheeky when pursuing her goals, which include (the unwilling) Shinkai's affections.
- Jane Naito (Naoto Takenaka) – a captain, he has a colourful character with a sense of humor and relaxed behavior. A womanizer popular with cabin attendants, he has been married (and divorced) at least twice and makes frequent advances towards female colleagues.
- Ryujiro Azumi (Shinichiro Azumi) - a co-pilot.
- Takashi Shimamura (Hironari Amano), a young mechanic working together with Ayumi Ogawa, protective of her.
- Ryoji Shinkai (Ikariya Chosuke) – Hajime's father, once a captain of large ships, now owns a small fishing boat business in the middle of the port of Tokyo. Wished Hajime to take over the family business and has a strained relationship with him because he chose to become a pilot instead.
- Makoto Shinkai (Akiyoshi Nakao) – Hajime's younger brother, a high school student, with whom Hajime frequently fights.
- Kaori Ogawa (Miwako Ichikawa) – Ayumi's good-natured sister, with whom she shares an apartment.
- Park Mi-suk (Yoon Son-ha) – a Korean neighbour of Shinkai, who perplexes and embarrasses him with displays of affection, calling him Shao and implying a relationship between them (which does not exist). Serves as a comedic relief between the more serious scenes.

== Summary ==
The series presents the characters interacting at work and outside of it. The focus are the flight operations, with the crew characters finding themselves inflight together having to deal with some difficult or unusual occurrences, such as unruly guests, equipment malfunctions, medical emergencies and diversions. The characters have to prove themselves handling those situations, and their relationships are both put to the test and develop.

On the ground, the characters meet at All Nippon Airways main base at Narita Airport, as well as restaurants and bars and the characters and their families' homes. The series features many scenes in the outdoors, including portraying characters driving or riding a boat. Some scenes are shot actually on location at Narita, at the ANA headquarters and maintenance hangars, with ANA employees serving as extras.

== Reception ==
Good Luck!! topped the Japanese drama ratings with 35% of the Japanese viewership in 2003. The first episode aired on January 19, 2003, with ratings of 31.6%, the third highest ratings of an opening episode, behind Beautiful Life and HERO, also starring Takuya Kimura.

The single episode ratings are as follows:

Episode	Nationwide
01	31.6%
02	27.5%
03	28.6%
04	27.6%
05	30.9%
06	28.2%
07	28.9%
08	29.7%
09	33.5%
10	37.6%
Average	30.41%

== Trivia and notes ==
- World-famous ballet dancer Kumakawa Tetsuya guest stars as himself as a passenger in Episode 5

== See also ==
- Japanese television programs
