= Twelve Nights =

2018 South Korean television series

- Promotional poster
- Also known as: 12 Nights
- Hangul: 열두밤
- RR: Yeoldubam
- MR: Yŏldubam
- Genre: Romance
- Written by: Hwang Sook-mi
- Directed by: Jung Hyun-soo
- Starring: Han Seung-yeon; Shin Hyun-soo
- Country of origin: South Korea
- Original language: Korean
- No. of episodes: 12

Production
- Camera setup: Single-camera
- Running time: 80 minutes
- Production company: Channel A

Original release
- Network: Channel A
- Release: October 12 – December 28, 2018

Twelve Nights (Korean: 열두밤; RR: Yeoldubam) is a 2018 South Korean television series starring Han Seung-yeon and Shin Hyun-soo. It is produced by and aired on Channel A's Fridays at 23:00 KST from October 12 to December 28, 2018.

== Synopsis ==
It tells the story of two people who spend twelve nights together over three trips in 2010, 2015 and 2018.

== Cast ==
=== Main ===
- Han Seung-yeon as Han Yoo-kyung
- Shin Hyun-soo as Cha Hyun-oh

=== Supporting ===
- Jang Hyun-sung as Lee Baek-man
- Yoo Joon-hong as Ban Koo-wal
- Hwang Jae-won as Yoon Chan
- Kim Do-wan as Yoo Chan
- Ye Soo-jung as Lee Ri
- Lee Ye-eun as Kang Chae-won
- Kim Bum-jin as Yoo Ki-tae
- Lee Joo-young as Sophia
- Han Ji-eun as Park Sun-joo
- Woo Ki-hoon as Yoo Shik-eun
- Lee Sun-tae as Lee Kyu-jin
- Bret Lindquist as Thomas
- Seo Eun-woo as Moon Hye-ran
- Cha Soo-yeon as Yoon Hong-joo
- Sung Chang-hoon as Kim Jae-wook
- Lee Gun-woo as Kang Eun-pyo
- Kim Yi-kyung as Joo A-reum
- Hwang So-hee as Park Se-jung
- Felipe Arca as Pierre
- Kim Young-joon as Kang Seok
- Han Da-sol as Cheon Da-young

== Production ==
The first script reading took place early in June 2018 at Donga Digital Media Center in Sangam-dong, Seoul, South Korea.
