= Toshihito Ito =

Japanese actor

- 伊藤 俊人
- Born: February 16, 1962; Niigata, Niigata, Japan
- Died: 24 May 2002 (aged 40)
- Occupation: Actor
- Years active: 1989–2002

Toshihito Ito (伊藤俊人, Itō Toshihito) (February 16, 1962 – May 24, 2002) was a Japanese actor and member of the Tokyo Sunshine Boys theatrical troupe. He was born on February 16, 1962, in Niigata, Japan.

== Biography ==
He performed on stage, and on television in series such as Trick and Furuhata Ninzaburō. His trademark was his large, thick-rimmed glasses, which he used solely for comic effect, as he actually had 20/20 vision.

Ito joined the Tokyo Sunshine Boys in 1983, while he was a student. When he graduated from university he continued acting but took a full-time job as a standard salaryman until his career in acting picked up.

He was married in 2000 to a stylist that he met while filming the TV drama Shomuni, after dating her for less than six months. He died two years later, just before inclusion of the TV drama Shomuni FINAL. They had no children. He died on May 24, 2002, from a spinal cord infection caused by a subarachnoid hemorrhage.

== Film ==
- 1995 Salaryman Senka
- 1996 Tomoko no Baai
- 1997 Marutai no Onna
- 1999 GTO

== Television ==
- 1993 Furikaereba Yatsu ga Iru
- 1994 Furuhata Ninzaburō
- 1995 Oosama no Restaurant
- 1996 Imaizumi Shintaro
- 1996 Konna Watashi ni Dare ga Shita
- 1997 Odoru Daisosasen
- 1998 Shomuni
- 1999 Omizu no Hanamichi
- 2001 Gakko no Sensei
- 2002 Nurseman
- 2002 Trick 2

== Selected theatre ==
- Nobody Else But You
- Vamp Show (Parco Produce)
