= Ore wa Abare Hatchaku =

- Genre: Drama
- Country of origin: Japan
- Original language: Japanese
- No. of episodes: 56

Original release
- Network: TV Asahi
- Release: February 3, 1979 – March 8, 1980

Ore wa Abare Hatchaku (俺はあばれはっちゃく) is a Japanese television drama series that first aired on TV Asahi in 1979.
