= 2020 May's Love =

- Genre: Drama
- Written by: Yoshikazu Okada
- Directed by: Daishi Matsunaga
- Starring: Yō Yoshida; Yō Ōizumi
- Country of origin: Japan
- Original language: Japanese

Production
- Producer: Makiko Okano
- Production company: Wowow

Original release
- Network: Wowow
- Release: June 2 – June 5, 2020

2020 May's Love (2020年 五月の恋) is a Japanese drama produced by WOWOW. It was broadcast for free on WOWOW's official YouTube channel and WOWOW Members On Demand from May 28 to May 31, 2020, at 21:00. It was also broadcast on WOWOW Prime from June 2 to June 5, 2020, at 23:45 to 00:00. The short drama consists of 4 episodes and was produced remotely, depicting the interaction between a divorced couple who mistakenly contact each other during the COVID-19 pandemic. The screenplay was written by Yoshikazu Okada and directed by Daishi Matsunaga, starring Yō Yoshida and Yō Ōizumi.

The "Special Edition" which combines all 4 episodes with previously unreleased footage, was broadcast for free on WOWOW Prime starting at 13:00 on July 5.

== Production ==
Due to the suspension of the drama series "Cold Case 3 - Shinjitsu no Tobira" because of the COVID-19 pandemic, Yō Yoshida participated in a remote reading of the play "12 Gentle Japanese" on May 6, which was well received by the audience. She felt the potential for "great entertainment that can only be created during the pandemic." Believing that a serialized drama could be created similarly, she proposed this project.

On May 8, Yoshida called producer Makiko Okano and expressed the need to "do something only possible now," initiating the project. Yoshida wanted Yoshikazu Okada as the writer, Yō Ōizumi as her co-star, and Daishi Matsunaga as the director. Okada, who was exploring new forms of entertainment during the production halt, had already expressed interest in a project involving phone calls. He quickly agreed to join, believing that with talented actors, an interesting drama could be created, and wrote the two-person script in about 10 days. Yō Ōizumi, who co-starred with Yoshida as a married couple in the NHK Taiga drama "Sanada Maru," agreed to join after receiving a direct email from Yoshida. Matsunaga, who directed Yoshida in the film "Hanalei Bay" and was contemplating what he could do during the challenging times, also joined, making the project a reality. It premiered online on May 28, just 20 days after the project's inception.

The production involved collaboration from television production staff as well as staff experienced in live streaming concerts and films. Yoshida and Ōizumi performed in different locations, with director Matsunaga coordinating the performances from another location. Despite the communication challenges of not being in the same space, the absence of production staff during the performances allowed the actors to focus on their acting, revealing new possibilities in their performances.

== Synopsis ==
In May 2020, Tokyo. Yukiko, responsible for a major supermarket's central store, continues to work despite the stay-at-home requests. Motō, working in sales at a medium-sized design company, struggles with remote work at home. The two were formerly married but divorced about four years ago.

They have had no contact since their divorce. By chance, Motō accidentally calls Yukiko. Reluctantly, Yukiko answers the call from her ex-husband after a long time.

== Characters ==
Yukiko (ユキコ)
Played by Yō Yoshida
Works at a major supermarket as the central store manager. Motō's ex-wife, single after one divorce.
Motō (モトオ)
Played by Yō Ōizumi
Works in sales at a medium-sized design company. Yukiko's ex-husband, single after one divorce.

== Staff ==
- Screenplay - Yoshikazu Okada
- Director - Daishi Matsunaga
- Producer - Makiko Okano
- Technical cooperation - WOWOW Entertainment
- Production - WOWOW

== Broadcast schedule ==
Episode	Online broadcast	TV broadcast
First Night	May 28	June 2
Second Night	May 29	June 3
Third Night	May 30	June 4
Final Night	May 31	June 5
