= Cagnet (band) =

American musicians

Cagnet was a soulful pop and R&B group that became successful in Japan due to their contributions to drama soundtracks Long Vacation and Love Generation. Although they were established in Santa Monica, California, United States, their debut was in Japan. Their song "Rage in the Sky" lasted for four weeks on the Oricon singles chart, reaching 79.

== Band members ==
- Anna McMurphy - lead vocals
- Natalie Burks - backing vocals
- Rowan Robertson - guitars
- Jimi Paxson - drums
- Perry Frank - bass
- Daisuke Hinata - synthesizer, producer, composer

== Discography ==
- "Long Vacation" (soundtrack to the Japanese drama Long Vacation)
- Here We Are Again – Long Vacation (album of Long Vacation)
- "Deeper and Deeper"
- "Groove Radio"
- "Rage in the Sky"
- "Love Generation"
- Best of Cagnet World
- "Cagnet Generation"
- Cagnet Music Generation
- "King of Comedy"
- "Love Story"
