= Tomoko Yamaguchi =

Japanese actress and singer

- 山口 智子
- Born: October 20, 1964 (age 61); Tochigi, Tochigi Prefecture, Japan
- Occupations: Actress, Voice actress
- Years active: 1986–1996; 2012–present
- Height: 170 cm (5 ft 7 in)
- Spouse: Toshiaki Karasawa (m. 1995)
- Website: https://www.ken-on.co.jp/yamaguchi/

Tomoko Yamaguchi (山口 智子, Yamaguchi Tomoko; born October 20, 1964) is a Japanese actress, voice actress and singer from Tochigi. She is the lead actress for the classic dorama series Long Vacation, starring alongside Takuya Kimura.

== Filmography ==
=== Television ===
- Asadora Jun-chan no ōenka (1988–89), Junko Ono
- I'll Never Love Anyone Anymore (1991), Miyuki Tashiro
- Men Who Want to Get Married (1991), Shinobu Tori
- The Closest of Cousins (1992), Eiko Kawashima
- Double Kitchen (1993), Hanaoka Miyako
- Christmas at the Age of 29 (1994), Yabuki Noriko
- Sweet Home (1994), Wakaba Inoue
- King's Restaurant (1995), Shizuka Ishono
- Furuhata Ninzaburō (1996), Hōyō Futaba
- Long Vacation (1996), Minami Hayama
- Leaders (2014), Haruko Aichi
- Leaders 2 (2017), Haruko Aichi
- Hello, Detective Hedgehog (2017), Kaoru Kaze
- Natsuzora (2019), Ayami Kishikawa
- Medical Examiner Asagao (2019)
- Gift (2026), Hiroe Sakamoto

=== Films ===
- Tōi Umi kara Kita Coo (1993), Catherine "Cathy" Ono (voice)
- Ghost Pub (1994), Satoko
- Undo (1994), Moemi
- Swallowtail Butterfly (1996), Shen Mei
- Trap (1996), Mizuki
- The Golden Compass (2007), Mrs. Coulter (Japanese dub)
- Ponyo (2008), Lisa (voice)
- One Last Bloom (2023), Reiko Sanada

== Awards ==
Year	Award	Category	Work(s)	Result	Ref.
1995	19th Elan d'or Awards	Newcomer of the Year	Herself	Won	
1996	5th TV Life Annual Drama Awards	Best Supporting Actress	King's Restaurant	Won	
1997	6th TV Life Annual Drama Awards	Best Actress	Long Vacation	Won	

== Personal life ==
She has been married to Toshiaki Karasawa since December 1995.
