= Eriko Kitagawa =

Japanese screenwriter and film director (born 1961)

- Born: December 24, 1961 (age 64); Minokamo, Gifu Prefecture, Japan
- Education: Waseda University - Literature and Philosophy
- Occupations: Screenwriter, Film director

Eriko Kitagawa (北川 悦吏子) (born December 24, 1961) is a Japanese screenwriter and film director. She is best known for writing Japanese television dramas, notably Long Vacation (1996), Beautiful Life (2000), Sora Kara Furu Ichioku no Hoshi (2002), and Orange Days (2004).

In 2009, Kitagawa made her directorial debut in the coming-of-age film Halfway, which she also wrote and co-edited. She then wrote and directed the 2012 film I Have to Buy New Shoes, a contemporary romantic comedy set in Paris. Both films were produced by her friend Shunji Iwai, and Kitagawa appeared in his 2011 documentary Friends after 3.11, which explores the aftermath of the 2011 Tōhoku earthquake and tsunami.

== Filmography ==
- I Have to Buy New Shoes (2012)

== Television series ==
- Yonimo Kimyona Monogatari ("Tales of the Unusual") (Fuji TV, 1991–1996)
  - すみません、握手してください (1996)
  - 隣の声 (1993)
  - 午前3時のノック (1991)
  - もう一人の花嫁 (1991)
  - 昔みたい (1990)
  - 佐藤・求む (1991) (co-written)
  - 「三日間だけのエース (1991)
  - 未来の思い出 (1991)
  - 大蒜（にんにく） (1991)
  - つまらない男 (1991)
  - 伝言板 (1991)
  - ズンドコベロンチョ (1991)
  - 忘れられたメス (1991)
- Panasonic Special もっと、ときめきを －ふたりまでの距離－ (Nippon TV, 1992)
- ぼくが医者をやめた理由 (TV Tokyo, 1990) (co-written)
- Sugao no Mama de ("Just the Way We Are") (Fuji TV, 1992)
- Sono Toki, Heart wa Nusumareta ("Who Stole My Heart") (Fuji TV, 1992)
- Chance! (Fuji TV, 1993) (episodes 1, 4, 7, 10, 12)
- Asunaro Hakusho (Fuji TV, 1993)
- Kimi to Ita Natsu ("A Summer With You") (Fuji TV, 1994)
- Aishiteiru to Itte Kure ("Tell Me You Love Me") (TBS, 1995)
- Long Vacation (Fuji TV, 1996)
- Saigo no Koi ("A Forever Love") (TBS, 1997)
- Over Time (Fuji TV, 1999)
- Beautiful Life (TBS, 2000)
- Love Story (TBS, 2001)
- Sora Kara Furu Ichioku no Hoshi ("A Million Stars Falling from the Sky") (Fuji TV, 2002)
- Orange Days (TBS, 2004)
- Tatta Hitotsu no Koi ("Just One Love") (NTV, 2006)
- Heaven's Postman (SBS/TV Asahi, 2010)
- Sunao ni Narenakute ("Hard to Say I Love You") (Fuji TV, 2010)
- Okaasan no Saigo no Ichinichi (TV Asahi, 2010)
- Irodori Himura (TBS, 2012)
- Half Blue Sky (NHK, 2018)

== Theater ==
- 彼女の言うことには。 (2012)

== Awards ==
- 1995 6th Television Drama Academy Awards: Best Screenwriter (Aishiteiru to Itte Kure)
- 1996 9th Television Drama Academy Awards: Best Screenwriter (Long Vacation)
- 2000 24th Television Drama Academy Awards: Best Screenwriter (Beautiful Life)
- 2002 33rd Television Drama Academy Awards: Best Screenwriter (Sora Kara Furu Ichioku no Hoshi)
- 2004 41st Television Drama Academy Awards: Best Screenwriter (Orange Days)

== See also ==
- List of Eriko Kitagawa's published works (in Japanese)
