= Furuhata Ninzaburō =

Japanese police detective TV series

- Genre: Police procedural
- Created by: Kōki Mitani
- Starring: Masakazu Tamura; Masahiko Nishimura; Takashi Kobayashi; Toshihito Ito; Shirai Akira; Masanori Ishii
- Country of origin: Japan
- Original language: Japanese
- No. of seasons: 4
- No. of episodes: 42

Production
- Production companies: Fuji Television; Kyodo Television

Original release
- Network: FNS (Fuji TV)
- Release: April 13, 1994 – January 3, 2004

Furuhata Ninzaburō (古畑 任三郎) is a Japanese television series that ran periodically on Fuji Television from 1994 until its final episode (special) in 2008. It was written by Japanese playwright Kōki Mitani and is often referred to as the Japanese version of Columbo.

The series is a police detective drama starring actor Masakazu Tamura as Furuhata Ninzaburo and Masahiko Nishimura as his stereotypically bumbling sidekick, Shintaro Imaizumi. The program aired weekly and featured a guest villain each time, usually a famous talent in Japan. Pop-stars like Takuya Kimura of SMAP, television hosts like Sanma Akashiya, and even sports figures like Ichiro Suzuki have been featured on the program. It was one of the most popular television dramas in the history of Japanese television.

== Plot patterns ==
Furuhata opens each episode with a humorous monologue that appears to be a non-sequitur but really contains a hint or clue relevant to the following mystery, followed by the opening credits.

The viewers witness the ingenious murder and watch the killer cover up the crime (usually by staging the murder as an accident). The murder is then discovered, and Furuhata is usually called in by the police to investigate; sometimes he just coincidentally happens to be nearby when the crime is discovered. The murderer hangs around the scene of the crime to misdirect the investigation by throwing in several red herrings.

Despite the killer's interference, Furuhata spends the episode trying to spot the real evidence and determining exactly how the crime was committed. Furuhata does this by obnoxiously hanging around his chief suspect (much to the exasperation of the criminal). Just before the final act, Furuhata "breaks the fourth wall" and challenges the audience to guess:

- What tiny slip-up the killer made which let Furuhata know who the killer was,
- What clue(s) Furuhata spotted which led him to figure out how the crime was committed, and
- what ingenious trap Furuhata will use to get the killer to confess their crime.

The charm of the story is that while the audience already knows the killer's identity from the episode's outset, it is still up to them to follow along with Furuhata's investigation and spot the clues which will lead to the solution.

== The character of Furuhata ==
=== Looks and mannerisms ===
- He wears a black suit, usually over a black shirt but never a tie.
- He usually has awkward posture, stooping at a 45-degree angle at the waist and carrying his hands in front of his chest like a mouse on hind paws.
- Since he stoops, he tilts his head and looks up at the person he speaks to, rather than at eye level.
- His hair is shoulder-length (unusual for a Japanese cop) but always excellently coiffed.
- He speaks in a halting, mumbling tone, elongates his vowels abnormally, uses the honorific, ultra-polite register of Japanese when speaking, and hums while thinking.
- He has odd "tics", like poking his forehead with his finger when thinking.

== Shintaro Imaizumi ==
The character of Shintaro Imaizumi (今泉 慎太郎 Imaizumi Shintarō), portrayed by Masahiko Nishimura, is the bumbling, inept sidekick of Furuhata. Imaizumi tends to be quite childlike and very passive. Imaizumi somewhat resembles Charlie Brown in personality.

His character not only acts as comic relief, but acts as the Watson to Furuhata's Sherlock Holmes. Through his naïveté and ineptitude, Imaizumi often falls for the red herrings left by the killer and comes to the conclusion that the murderer intended. Furuhata then scolds Imaizumi, explaining why he shouldn't have jumped to such a conclusion. Thus, he acts as a sounding board for Furuhata to explain his theories and as a proxy for the viewing audience.

Furuhata can be mean to Imaizumi. He is often visibly annoyed by Imaizumi's incompetence and often hurls insults at Imaizumi or gives Imaizumi demeaning tasks. Furuhata constantly slaps Imaizumi on his forehead.

Imaizumi still lives with his grandmother and counts knitting, magic tricks and flower arrangement among his hobbies. He loves meat-stuffed peppers, his favorite movie is Grease, his favorite group is ABBA, his favorite Golden Half member is Eva, and his favorite song is Dancing Queen.

In season 2, Shintaro Imaizumi featured in a series of 7 minute skits which aired after the main "Furuhata Ninzaburo" episode.

== Other recurring characters ==
- Otokichi Mukojima (向島 音吉 Mukōjima Otokichi) - aka Otokichi Higashikunibaru (東国原 音吉), played by Takashi Kobayashi (小林 隆 Kobayashi Takashi). Mukojima is a patrolman that often greets Furuhata at the scene of the crime. His first appearance is in Episode 2, and he is the only recurring character (besides Furuhata and Imaizumi) to have appeared in every season of the show. Mukojima is the subject of a long running gag in the show. Despite formally introducing himself in several episodes, Furuhata often forgets Mukojima's name. Furuhata tries to memorize it but by the next episode has forgotten it. In an "Imaizumi Shintaro" skit, it is revealed that Otokichi adopted his wife's last name because he married into a Zaibatsu (extremely wealthy, established) family with no male heir. Furuhata finally manages to memorize Otokichi's last name at the finale of Series 2; however, Mukojima then reveals he got a divorce and changed back to his original last name (which is obscure, long, and cumbersome). Afterwards, Otokichi has to remind everyone that his name is now Higashikunibaru. Later, he reconciles with his wife and changes his surname back to Mukojima. In a "Final Series" (2006) episode, it is revealed that Mukojima is baseball superstar Ichiro's half-brother (fictional). In the Chugakusei Furuhata (2008) special, Mukojima is shown to have a son. Strangely, the 2008 Furuhata Chugakusei special (which was written 14 years after Series 1), reveals that Furuhata and Otokichi were friends for a few months during Junior High. Otokichi's last name at the time is Mukojima, not Higashikunibaru. Though its implied they may have been in periodic contact before Series 1, Furuhata does not appear to recognize Otokitchi when they meet in Episode 2.
- Mantaro Kuwabara (桑原 万太郎 Kuwabara Mantarō), played by Toshihito Ito, is a forensic scientist who works at the crime lab. He appears in some Series 1, Series 2 and Series 3 episodes but was featured prominently in all the Season 2 Imaizumi Shintaro skits. These skits often featured Kuwabara consoling Imaizumi after he vents his frustration with his treatment during the episode. Sadly, Ito died in 2002 of a brain hemorrhage.
- Haga Keiji (芳賀 啓二 Haga Keiji) played by Shirai Akira (白井 晃 Shirai Akira), is a detective who has made several appearances in the series. His appearances include: episodes 14, 17, 25, 27 and two Shintaro Imaizumi skits. Haga has filled in for Imaizumi when the latter has been unavailable (when Imaizumi was imprisoned on suspicion of murder and when Imaizumi was trapped on a ferris wheel with a bomb). Imaizumi and Haga are bitter rivals and extremely competitive with one another for Furuhata's attention. Haga is much more competent than Imaizumi, and Furuhata has said he would like Haga to replace Imaizumi as his partner. In the 1999 Special, Haga is now Head of the Detective Division, and he assigns Saionji to become Furuhata's new partner.
- Mamoru Saionji (西園寺 守 Saionji Mamoru), played by Masanori Ishii (石井 正則 Ishi'i Masanori), appears in the third and fourth season of Furuhata Ninzaburo. He is a 'second' sidekick to Furuhata and a direct contrast to Imaizumi. Saionji is serious, logical and competent as opposed to the silly, immature, and inept Imaizumi. Saionji is a huge admirer of Furuhata and emulates his skills as a detective. As the season progresses, he becomes an excellent detective whose skills of observation and deduction nearly rival Furuhata's. Saionji is only 5'2" tall but has remarked he is the tallest amongst his relatives.
- Hanada (花田) is a character played by Norito Yashima who appears in several Series 3 episodes as well as the 2004 Special. He is a bystander who randomly (and conveniently) appears when the detectives are at an impasse in their investigation. After overhearing the detectives' conversation, Hanada is able to accurately deduce the killer's motive or modus operandi. He is uncannily correct and disappears from the episode after he has made his point, leaving the detectives to find the hard evidence. He has appeared every time in a different occupation. First, he was a waiter in a family restaurant (Episode 27), then a manager at a cafe (Episode 31), next a server in a pub (Episode 33), then a flight attendant (Episode 36), a taxi driver (Episode 38) and as an employee in the Japanese embassy to Spain (Episode 39). He also appears for a few seconds in a brief non-speaking cameo as the flight attendant in the January 2004 "Imaizumi Shintaro" skit which aired right after Episode 39. In Episode 39, Hanada reveals that the flight attendant in Episode 36 and 2004 Imaizumi skit is actually his older (twin?) brother.
- Matsuzaka the Stage Director (松阪 Matsuzaka) played by Isao Nonaka (野仲功 Nonaka Isao). Matsuzaka has appeared three times in the Furuhata series. He first appears as the stage director for SMAP's show in Episode 26. He reappears as the stage director for the "Rakugo" performance in Episode 28. By the time he meets Furuhata again in Episode 33 (directing an orchestral performance), he becomes exasperated, wondering if every performance he directs will end in murder. Incidentally, Isao Nonaka appeared briefly in Episode 22 as a taxi driver driving Furuhata and the suspect to the bowling alley. It's not clear if the taxi driver is Matsuzaka moonlighting in a different job (like Hanada).

== Episode list / Guest stars ==
=== Series 1 (1994) ===
No. overall	No. in series	Title	Translated Title	Killer played by:	Victim played by:	Original release date
1	1	"死者からの伝言"	"Message from the Dead"	Akina Nakamori	Takeshi Ikeda	April 13, 1994
Special Appearance: Dog - "Ben" Furuhata seeks shelter from the rain in a house belonging to a shoujo manga artist, who locked her boyfriend in the house's basement vault three days earlier. The detective must contend with a baffling dying message and explain how the victim was bludgeoned while locked in the vault—riddles which not even the killer can answer. Although this was the first episode aired, it takes place chronologically after the second aired episode. Furuhata develops his love of Shojo manga. Chinami Koishikawa, the suspect, is referenced in several later episodes of the entire Furuhata series.
2	2	"動く死体"	"The Moving Corpse"	Masaaki Sakai	Kitarou	April 20, 1994
A kabuki actor kills a security guard who witnessed him committing a hit-and-run and uses a stage elevator to bring his body to the theatre, making it look like he fell from the catwalk. Furuhata and Imaizumi meet each other for the first time; Mukojima's first appearance; The first of Furuhata's problems with vending machines.
3	3	"笑える死体"	"The Funny Corpse"	Yuko Kotegawa	Yuuichi Haba	April 27, 1994
A psychiatric therapist concocts a plan to murder her illegitimate lover by tricking him into entering her home through the window while dressed as a burglar, making the crime look like self-defense. Can Furuhata prove the incident was actually a planned murder? Establishes that the only foods Furuhata knows how to prepare are: chawanmushi, meat stuffed peppers and meatloaf.
4	4	"殺しのファックス"	"Killer Fax"	Tsurube Shofukutei	Yoko Takayanagi	May 4, 1994
A mystery writer stages an alibi by faxing himself ransom notes from a murderous killer demanding millions of yen in exchange for his wife. Will the culprit pull off his elaborate act without making a fatal mistake? Establishes Furuhata's love of extremely sweet foods. Establishes Furuhata's love of fish sausages.
5	5	"汚れた王将"	"The Tainted King"	Yasosuke Bando	Akiji Kobayashi	May 11, 1994
Special Appearance: Tōru Minegishi To secure victory in a tournament, a shogi player comes up with a plan to cheat. He suspends the game and places an empty card in a sealed envelope. When a coordinator notices, he's forced to kill him, dragging Furuhata and Imaizumi into the case. The detective must explain how a new move was written onto the sealed card, with a strange mark in the corner serving as his only clue. Furuhata and Imaizumi are staying at an inn hosting a shogi tournament. Furuhata is reading a shoujo manga "Kirimantan" by Chinami Oishikawa. He mentions he can't wait to take the train back and order a subuta bento. The reason for this is explained in episode 8.
6	6	"ピアノ・レッスン"	"Piano Lesson"	Nana Kinomi	Shinsho Nakamaru	May 18, 1994
A skilled pianist electrocutes a colleague to take his place at a memorial service for her departed teacher but breaks the instrument in the process. Demonstrates Furuhata's love of convenience store foods
7	7	"殺人リハーサル"	"Rehearsal for Murder"	Nenji Kobayashi	Hatsunori Hasegawa	May 25, 1994
An actor in samurai period films wants to kill a studio's owner to keep him from replacing it with a shopping mall. He rehearses a climactic scene with his enemy playing the villain, slicing his throat so that every witness swears it was a prop-and-choreography accident. Furuhata arrives on the scene, intent not on proving the actor killed the victim, but that he did it on purpose. Two ladies on a tour of the movie studio, break away from the group and take a picture of the suspect. These same two ladies would appear in Episode 9.
8	8	"殺人特急"	"Murder Express"	Takeshi Kaga	Sabu Sawahara	June 8, 1994
Special Appearance: Zen Kajiwara A doctor meets with a private investigator who has proof of his infidelity while in transit and kills him with a lethal injection, stealing the jacket containing the pictures. Unfortunately, Furuhata happens to be taking the same train. First mention of Furuhata's love of subuta bento. Though this is the 8th aired episode, chronologically it takes place shortly after Episode 5.
9	9	"殺人公開放送"	"Murder on Public Broadcast"	Ken Ishiguro	Tsutomu Okabe	June 15, 1994
Special Appearance: Takashi Yamaguchi Furuhata and Imaizumi watch a live psychic television show, whose star battles with a local professor to prove his powers are real. The show builds to a climax as the psychic "discovers" a body using his powers, but Furuhata believes he's responsible for the death. The two ladies who spill a drink on and sit behind Furuhata are the same ladies (wearing the same clothes) from Episode 7 .
10	10	"矛盾だらけの死体"	"A Corpse Full of Contradictions"	Kazuki Kosakai	Noriko Izumoto	June 15, 1994
Special Appearance: Shūichirō Moriyama The secretary of a prominent position gets involved in a plan to deal with his boss's affair partner, but after the politician threatens to pass him over as a successor, he decides to kill him as well. To the culprit's surprise, Furuhata arrives and reveals that his second victim survived. Furuhata has more trouble with vending machines. This would have been the first episode to feature two murders, but the second victim gets amnesia instead of dying.
11	11	"さよなら、DJ"	"Farewell, DJ"	Kaori Momoi	Saori Yagi	June 22, 1994
Special Appearance: Michiko Ameku Furuhata is at a radio station where a celebrity DJ received several death threats, but she'd been sending them to herself in preparation to murder her subordinate for stealing her boyfriend. She manages to kill her during a very short break in her cell, a feat which the two detectives struggle to replicate. This episode is notable as the first one with the "Akai Senmenki" running gag. This joke purportedly has the funniest punchline ever but much to Furuhata's chagrin, the punchline is never revealed to him. This is a long running gag which appears throughout the series. In Koki Mitani's movie, "Rajio Jikan (Welcome Back, Mr. McDonald)", Kaori Momoi has a cameo playing a DJ with the same name and spelling as her Furuhata character on a radio programs also called "Midnight Japan".
12	12	"最後のあいさつ"	"His Last Bow"	Bunta Sugawara	Jun Nakahara	June 29, 1994
Special Appearance: Zen Kajiwara A legendary senior detective guns down the acquitted murderer of his granddaughter while conducting a stakeout. But how could he commit the murder and witness a suspected drug dealer enter a bar at the same time? Furuhata mentions that he has a younger brother and reveals he never carries a gun and doesn't know how to use one. Kuwabara Mantaro (Toshihito Ito)'s first appearance in the series. Mukojima appears. Zen Kajiwara's second appearance in the series.

=== Series 2 (1996) ===
No. overall	No. in series	Title	Translated Title	Killer played by:	Victim played by:	Original release date
14	1	"しゃべりすぎた男"	"The Man Who Talked Too Much"	Sanma Akashiya	Naomi Akimoto	January 10, 1996
Special Appearance: Akira Shirai, Megumi Odaka. Imaizumi is arrested for a young woman's murder and calls upon a friend from college to defend him in court. Unbeknownst to him, this lawyer committed the crime himself, and Furuhata takes to the witness stand to prevent him from sending Imaizumi to prison in his place. Haga makes his debut in the series. Mukojima appears. Furuhata reveals that Chinami Koishikawa (the suspect from Episode 1) was found innocent of her crime.
15	2	"笑わない女"	"The Woman Who Never Smiles"	Yasuko Sawaguchi	Kazuyuki Aijima	January 17, 1996
A Catholic school headmistress kills a beloved teacher, but her decision to leave the door open while committing the crime convinces Furuhata that he's dealing with a killer who follows strict rules. Furuhata rides in on his bike; Kazuyuki Aijima, was one of the Sunshine Boys along with Nishimura Masahiko, Takashi Kobayashi, Toshihito Ito and Zen Kajiwara.
16	3	"ゲームの達人"	"The Game Master"	Masao Kusakari	Shunji Fujimura/Saiko Isshiki	January 25, 1996
Special Appearance: Yoneko Matsukane A game-loving doctor convinces an aging mystery writer to fake a suicide attempt to win back his wife from an affair. Unfortunately, the author doesn't realize his friend is the other man, and the fake suicide is the first step in a cunning, brutal murder. First episode to feature two murders. Furuhata rides in on his bike, meets Mukojima; Saiko Isshiki would appear in the very last Furuhata episode in the Final Series. Shunji Fujimura is among a long list of Furuhata guest stars that have also appeared in Koki Mitani's movie "Welcome Back, Mr. McDonald" including: Masahiko Nishimura, Toshiaki Karasawa, Zen Kajiwara, Taguchi Hiromasa, Keiko Toda, Moro Moroka, Kaori Momoi, Ichikawa Somegoro, Yoshimasa Kondo, Takehiko Ono and Yasukio Umeno all who've appeared in Furuhata Ninzaburo episodes.
17	4	"赤か、青か"	"Red or Blue?"	Takuya Kimura	Dai Kanai	January 31, 1996
Special Appearance: Akira Shirai Imaizumi finds himself in danger again, stranded with a bomb in a Ferris wheel cabin. Furuhata suspects the young bomb disposal expert brought to assist of planting the bomb and killing a security guard, so he must find the proof and discover how to disarm the device before time is up. Takuya Kimura was the first guest actor to play two different suspects within the Furuhata series. He would return (playing a fictional version of himself) in the Jan 1999 Furuhata vs SMAP special; The only episode where Furuhata assaults a suspect; Haga and Mukojima make their re-appearance in this episode.
18	5	"偽善の報酬"	"Hypocrisy's Reward"	Haruko Kato	Moeko Ezawa	February 7, 1996
Special Appearance: Takashi Kobayashi A famous drama writer bludgeons her sister to death and attempts to make it look like the result of a break in. Furuhata's biggest challenge is identifying the murder weapon. The murder weapon is not shown on-screen until the end of the episode, challenging viewers to guess what weapon was used.
19	6	"VSクイズ王"	"VS. The Quiz King"	Toshiaki Karasawa	Hikaru Ijūin	February 14, 1996
Special Appearance: Yoshimasa Kondo Furuhata participated in a quiz show with disastrous results, but before leaving the studio he discovers the body of a costume designer. The reigning quiz champion had accidentally killed the victim while trying to cheat but manages to escape the crime scene while its only exit is closely watched by two comedians. Toshiaki Karasawa who played the suspect is married to Tomoko Yamaguchi who was the suspect in the 1996 special. He appeared with Yoshimasa Kondo in Koki Mitani's movie "Welcome Back, Mr. McDonald".
20	7	"動機の鑑定"	"Appraising the Motive"	Tojuro Sawamura	Itoshi Yumeji/Takuzo Kadono	February 21, 1996
Special Appearance: Takashi Kobayashi An antiquities dealer and museum director kills a sculptor who attempts to blackmail them. They pass it off as a robbery, beginning a deadly partnership. Furuhata arrives by cab straight from Chinami (the suspect from Episode 1)'s wedding, greeted by Mukojima.
21	8	"魔術師の選択"	"The Magician's Choice"	Shingo Yamashiro	Takashi Ikeda	February 28, 1996
Special Appearance: Takako Matsu. A magician uses psychological suggestion to kill a younger magician during a clairvoyance trick. Furuhata watches the crime but must learn the trade himself to unravel the culprit's scheme and understand his motive. The only episode where we don't know the suspect's real name; The victim tells the Akai Senmenki Joke but dies suddenly before revealing the punchline; We learn that Furuhata is now taking care of the cat from Episode 14; Matsu Takako's brother (Ichikawa Somegoro) would appear in a Series 3 episode. Their father, Matsumoto Koshiro would appear in the Furuhata Special.
22	9	"間違われた男"	"The Wrong Man"	Morio Kazama	Takehiko Ono	March 6, 1996
Special Appearance: Takashi Kobayashi. A killer experiences a string of bad luck leaving him trapped in his victim's apartment with Furuhata at the door, attempting to return a wallet. Can he escape before Furuhata discovers his true identity—and his crime? The suspect accomplishes TWO perfect murders until a chance encounter with Furuhata. Amazingly, without even knowing about either murder, Furuhata's skills of observation and lie detection allows him to eventually expose both crimes. Mukojima appears.
23	10	"ニューヨークでの出来事"	"The Incident in New York"	Honami Suzuki	Not shown	March 13, 1996
Special Appearance: Takashi Kobayashi. During a bus trip from Atlanta to New York City, Furuhata meets a Japanese woman who was acquitted for her husband's murder. She challenges Furuhata to determine how she poisoned a sweet she shared with the victim without dying herself, without giving him a chance to visit the scene. The second "case" to take place outside Japan. The only suspect to successfully get away with the perfect murder. The episode takes place during a bus trip from Atlanta to NY. Furuhata and Imaizumi are visiting Chinami, the suspect for Episode 1 who we learned has married and moved to the US.

=== Series 3 (1999) ===
No. overall	No. in series	Title	Translated Title	Killer played by:	Victim played by:	Original release date
28	1	"若旦那の犯罪"	"The Young Master's Crime"	Somegoro Ichikawa	Morooka Moro	April 13, 1999
Special Appearance: Yasukio Umeno. A rakugo comedian kills a fellow student and makes it look like a suicide by faking two alibis. Both take each other's places at different points of the day, leaving a complicated mystery for Furuhata to solve. Kabuki Actor Somegoro Ichikawa who plays the suspect is the brother of Matsu Takako and son of Koshiro Matsumoto, who've both appeared in other Furuhata episodes. Matsuzaka the Stage Director appears in this episode.
29	2	"その男、多忙につき"	"That Man is Too Busy"	Hiroyuki Sanada	Kitarou	April 20, 1999
A perpetually busy media director murders a politician in his hotel room while engaging in a phone call he would later use as his alibi. His meticulously planned schedule soon meets an obstacle in Furuhata Ninzaburou.
30	3	"灰色の村"	"The Grey Village"	Tatsuo Matsumura	Michiko Ameku	April 27, 1999
Special Appearance: Hachiro Oka Furuhata catches a cold and stops in a small village to recover with his colleagues, getting caught up in the entire community's attempt to cover up a murder. This episode takes place right after the events of Episode 32. Saionji keeps a daily journal and spends the night writing about the Anzai Incident. (Episode 32)
31	4	"古畑、歯医者へ行く"	"Furuhata Goes to the Dentist"	Mao Daichi	Tai Kageyama	May 4, 1999
Special Appearance: Yuko Ito A dentist murders her ex-boyfriend and attempts to use Furuhata as her alibi, tricking him and another witness into thinking she was cleaning his teeth at the time of the crime. Hanada appears in this episode.
32	5	"再会"	"Reunion"	Masahiko Tsugawa	Rieko Miura	May 11, 1999
Special Appearance: Shigeki Hosokawa Furuhata receives a mysterious invitation to an old friend's house. Beginning to suspect his friend plans to murder his cheating wife, Furuhata realizes this may be his chance to prevent a murder instead of solving one. Furuhata seems to be catching a cold as he keeps clearing his throat and coughing. The reason for this is not explained until Episode 30 (which was really supposed to air after this episode). "Mangoro" the dog from Episode 1, marks his re-appearance. Displays Furuhata poor game playing ability and his unsportsmanlike behaviour.
33	6	"絶対音感殺人事件"	"The Pitch Perfect Murder"	Masachika Ichimura	Shion Machita	May 18, 1999
A conductor murders a violinist he was having an affair with and seeks to frame her new boyfriend. Strangely, he also kills all of the victim's fish, which Furuhata used to deduce the killer's identity. Hanada appears. Matsuzaka the Stage Director appears.
34	7	"哀しき完全犯罪"	"A Sorrowful and Perfect Crime"	Misako Tanaka	Fumiyo Kohinata	May 25, 1999
A presenter of a Go-based TV program kills her manipulative husband who wanted her to remain a housewife forever. The behavior of their cat proves to be a clue to the crime. Fumio Kohinata would reappear in the last episode of the Final Series.
35	8	"頭でっかちの殺人"	"The Theoretical Murder"	Masaharu Fukuyama	Itsuji Itao	June 1, 1999
Special Appearance: Naho Toda A wheelchair-using scientist kills his colleague and old friend using a deadly gift and some well-timed phone calls. Saionji quickly suspects the scientist's ex-girlfriend of the crime, but Furuhata remains unconvinced. The only episode where the murderer is physically disabled.
36	9	"追いつめられて"	"Cornered in the Clouds"	Koji Tamaki	Chiharu Kawai	June 8, 1999
An archaeologist accidentally kills his lover during a fight in an aircraft lavatory when she threatens to expose their affair to his wife who is also on the flight. While covering up the crime, he's forced to masquerade as the co-pilot and avoid the child who witnessed him fleeing from the lavatory. Imaizumi's witnessing of a gremlin on the wing of the plane becomes a dangerous clue. While Furuhata provides support, this episode centers chiefly around Saionji and his investigation. Hanada appears.
37	10	"最も危険なゲーム・前編"	"The Most Dangerous Game - Part 1"	Yōsuke Eguchi	Masato Obara	June 15, 1999
Special Appearance: Isao Sasaki A shady group kills a young man but fails to recover the bag he stole. To get it back from a subway lost and found, they hack into its control room and stage a train hijacking. Furuhata happens to be on the scene, but the plot proves too complex for him to unravel in one episode. Furuhata admits that of all the suspects he's captured, this one was the hardest.
38	11	"最も危険なゲーム・後編"	"The Most Dangerous Game - Part 2"	Yōsuke Eguchi	Masato Obara	June 22, 1999
Special Appearance: Isao Sasaki Furuhata leaves the station with the suspect, intent on dropping off the ransom money. How will he prove the culprits true identity, and what is his opponent planning? The suspect tells the Akai Senmenki Joke, but the punchline is interrupted. Hanada appears.

=== Final series (2006) ===
The final series, written with the intention of being Furuhata's final adventures, consisted of three 2-hour TV movie specials.

No. overall	No. in series	Title	Translated Title	Killer played by:	Victim played by:	Original release date
40	1	"今、甦る死"	"And Now, Death is Resurrected"	Koji Ishizaka	Tetsuya Chiba	January 3, 2006
When a family is afflicted by a series of bizarre, accidental deaths, blame is fixed on a curse, but Furuhata suspects the new executive of the family business who has seemingly pulled his plans from his childhood notebook. Special Appearance: Tatsuya Fujiwara. Unlike other episodes, this one takes place in a more rural environment.
41	2	"フェアな殺人者"	"A Fair Murderer"	Ichiro Suzuki	Tomohiko Imai	January 4, 2006
Baseball player Ichiro Suzuki (whom Furuhata claims is a different person from the real star) kills his brother’s blackmailer. When Furuhata appears, he promises to engage him in a fair challenge. Special Appearance: Takashi Kobayashi. Ichiro Suzuki plays a fictional version of himself. Mukojima appears in this episode, revealing that he is Ichiro's older brother (fictional).
42	3	"ラスト・ダンス"	"Last Dance"	Nanako Matsushima	Nanako Matsushima	January 5, 2006
When one of a pair of twin screenwriting partners kills the other, Furuhata must contend with his infatuation for the culprit. The episode includes various jokes about an in-universe equivalent of Furuhata Ninzaburou. Special Appearance: Fumiyo Kohinata. The very last Furuhata episode with Tamura Masakazu as the lead. Nanako Matsushima plays a dual role (as twin sisters). Fumiyo Kohinata returns to the series, playing a different character. The character of the TV producer in this special is the same producer character of the Quiz Show in Episode 19.

=== Special episodes ===
Most episodes of Furuhata Ninzaburo ran for 50 minutes (excluding commercial and news breaks); however, the show would periodically air extended length TV movie specials.

No. overall	No. in series	Title	Translated Title	Killer played by:	Victim played by:	Original release date
13	1	"笑うカンガルー"	"The Laughing Kangaroo"	Takanori Jinnai	Hiromasa Taguchi	April 12, 1995
Special Appearance: Maki Mizuno. A group of mathematicians travel to Cairns, Australia, (which Furuhata happens to be visiting) to receive a prestigious award, but the two argue over who really deserves the credit. This results in one mathematician killing the other, only for him to recover, forcing the killer to strike again. The first case that takes place outside Japan, in Australia. The only episode where the victim is murdered twice.
24	2	"しばしのお別れ"	"A Brief Parting"	Tomoko Yamaguchi	Minako Osanai	March 27, 1996
Imaizumi takes a liking to the teacher of a flower arrangement course and invites Furuhata to one of her shows, only for the teacher’s mentor to be poisoned in the audience. Furuhata suspects the teacher of the crime, despite Imaizumi’s misgivings. Furuhata has more trouble with vending machines. Furuhata FINALLY remembers Mukojima's name. Tomoko Yamaguchi is married to Toshiaki Karasawa, the suspect from Episode 19.
25	3	"消えた古畑任三郎"	"Furuhata Gone Missing"	Masahiko Nishimura	Masakazu Tamura	April 9, 1996
Furuhata suddenly disappears, prompting shock and confusion from Imaizumi and his colleagues. They interrogate the criminals he’s previously put away to discover his whereabouts. The only episode presented in a "mockumentary" format. All the suspects for Series 1 and 2 reprise their roles for this special. Bunta Sugawara does not appear on-screen (except in flashback) but recorded a voice-over for this special. Tamura Masakazu does not make an on-screen appearance except in flashback scenes. Imaizumi accidentally locks Furuhata in the same safe the victim from Episode 1 was locked in.
26	4	"古畑任三郎 VS SMAP"	"Furuhata Ninzaburou vs. SMAP"	SMAP	Takashi Ukaji	January 3, 1999
Special Appearance: Toda Keiko. Furuhata is up against Japanese boy band SMAP, when the five stars team up to rid one of their members of a troublesome blackmailer shortly before a show. The group has to contend with the police agreement along with disputes among their members. Although this is the 26th aired episode, the events of this episode take place after the events of Episode #27. Technically, this is Saionji's first on-screen appearance in the series, though his character is really introduced in Episode 27. Furuhata still remembers Otokichi's last name from Episode 24, but "Mukojima" now reveals his name has switched to Higashikunibaru. The SMAP members play a fictionalized version of themselves.
27	5	"黒岩博士の恐怖"	"Dr. Kuroiwa's Fear"	Ken Ogata	Kanichi Kurita	April 6, 1999
Saoinji is instructed to bring Furuhata out of retirement to give him his most baffling case yet: a series of victims found with an omikuji (fortune telling card) describing the cause of their death inserted in their anus. When Furuhata identifies the culprit, his challenge is only beginning. Although it is the 27th aired episode, chronologically speaking, the events of this episode took place before Episode 26; Haga has been promoted to Chief of the investigative division; Furuhata meets Saionji for the first time; Otokichi reminds Furuhata his last name is Mukojima. (This episode's events take place before Mukojima's name change in Episode 26). Hanada's first appearance.
39	6	"すべて閣下の仕業"	"All By His Excellency's Hand"	Koshiro Matsumoto	Mitsuhiro Oikawa	January 3, 2004
Special Appearance: Masahiko Tsugawa. The Japanese ambassador of a Latin American country kills his aide to cover up his corruption and tries to pass off his disappearance as a kidnapping. However, Furuhata is trapped in the embassy thanks to a monkey stealing his passport. The third case to take place outside Japan. A Spaniard tells the Akai Senmenki Joke, but the punchline is told in Spanish which Furuhata doesn't understand. The only episode in which Imaizumi does not appear. Regulars Saionji or Mukojima do not appear either. Hanada appears as an attaché to the Japanese embassy in Spain. Koshiro Matsumoto is the father of Somegoro Ishikawa and Matsu Takako. Masahiko Tsugawa makes his second appearance in the Furuhata series.

=== Imaizumi Shintaro comedic skits (January 10, 1996 ~ March 27, 1996; Jan 3, 2004) ===
In the second season of the drama, Fuji TV produced a series of 7-minute comedic skits called "Imaizumi Shintaro" which followed the "Furuhata Ninzaburo" episode. These skits feature Imaizumi and his confidante Mantaro Kuwabara portrayed by Toshihito Ito. This series was immensely popular until the death of actor Ito in 2002. In the skits, meek and long suffering Imaizumi vents his anger and frustration about his treatment in the main episode. During the skits, he tries to prove that he is the superior detective, makes prank calls to Furuhata, works up the (drunken) courage to tell Furuhata off, and even plots the murder of Furuhata. However, the skit always ends with Imaizumi proving his ineptitude or losing his nerve, forcing Kuwabara to escort his sobbing, spineless, and broken friend out of the lab.

Despite the absence of Imaizumi, Saionji or Mukojima in the January 3, 2004 Furuhata Special, all three did appear in a 10-minute "Imaizumi" skit which aired later that night. Hanada also makes a brief cameo appearance.

=== Young Furuhata special (June 14, 2008) ===
During his last year in junior high, young Furuhata Ninzaburo, a bright but anti-social teenager, reluctantly moves to a small village with his single mom. His father abandoned the family years ago and his mother frequently stays out late working as a "snack-bar" hostess. Lonely and bored, young Furuhata, with the help of classmate Mukojima Otokichi, reads Sherlock Holmes and solves petty crimes. We see the origin and development of Furuhata's knack for observation, deduction and lie detection. Young Furuhata is played by Ryosuke Yamada and Young Mukojima is played by Tamoto Soran. Tamura Masakazu and Kobayashi Takashi make cameo appearances at the beginning and end of the episode, respectively. This special was written by Kōki Mitani. The show is considered canon, despite a few continuity errors with the earlier series.
