= Takuya Kimura =

Japanese actor, singer, and radio personality (born 1972)

- 木村 拓哉
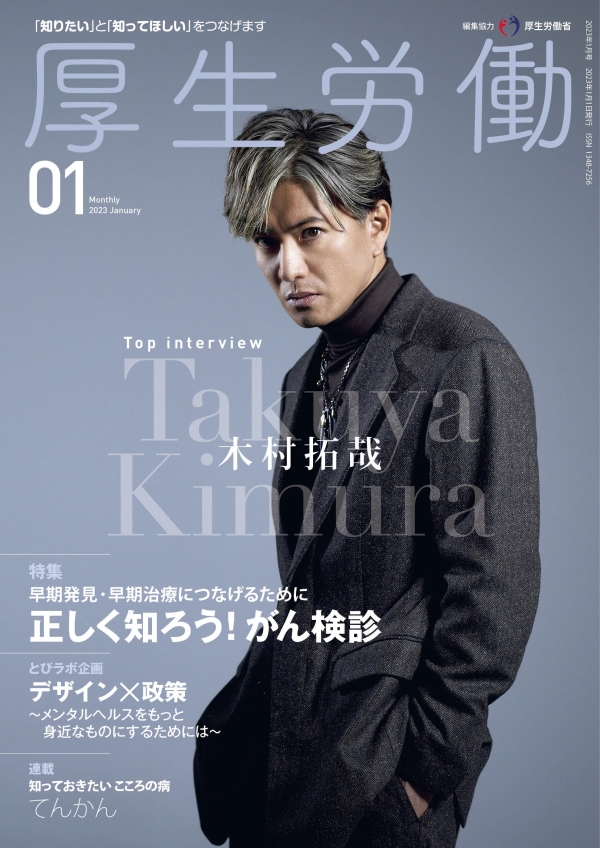
- Kimura on the front cover of the January 2023 issue of Kōsei Rōdō.
- Born: November 13, 1972 (age 53); Tokyo, Japan
- Occupations: Singer; actor
- Years active: 1987–present
- Agent: Starto Entertainment
- Spouse: Shizuka Kudo (m. 2000)
- Children: Cocomi; Kōki
- Musical career
- Genre: J-pop
- Instruments: Vocals, guitar, harmonica
- Label: Victor Entertainment
- Formerly of: SMAP
- Website: Starto Entertainment Profile

Signature
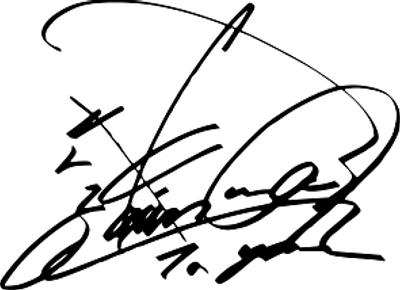

Takuya Kimura (Japanese: 木村 拓哉, Hepburn: Kimura Takuya; born November 13, 1972) is a Japanese actor, singer, and radio personality. He is regarded as a Japanese icon after achieving success as an actor. He was also a popular member of SMAP, one of the best-selling boy bands in Asia. In the media, he is known as a huge heartthrob in Japan, and a sex symbol, having been voted Japan's sexiest man for 15 years in a row by readers of one magazine.

A 1996 television drama series, Long Vacation, in which he landed his first lead role, became a massive success, creating a phrase called the "Lon-bake phenomenon". He was given the title, "The King of Ratings", as his subsequent television series continued to generate high ratings and each show became a social phenomenon as it aired. Five of his most successful television series, Hero (2001), Beautiful Life (2000), Love Generation (1997), Good Luck!! (2003), and Long Vacation (1996) are ranked in the top ten highest-rated television series in Japanese history. He has received the Best Actor award at the Television Drama Academy Awards 11 times and holds the record for most wins. He also starred in blockbuster films, including Love and Honor (2006), Hero (2007) and Howl's Moving Castle (as a voice actor, 2004).

Kimura is also known for his work in the video games Judgment and Lost Judgment, portraying Takayuki Yagami.

== Career ==
=== Music ===
In 1987, at age 15, Kimura auditioned to enter Johnny & Associates, a talent agency that recruits and trains young boys to become singers and members of boy bands. In Autumn 1987, twenty young boys, including Kimura, were put together into a group called The Skate Boys, which was initially created as backup dancers for a famous boy band, Hikaru Genji. In April 1988, producer Johnny Kitagawa chose six out of the twenty boys to create a new boy band; "SMAP." The group became one of the most successful boy bands in Asia and are regarded as an iconic group in Japan with 24 top-10 albums and 14 number-one albums. SMAP officially disbanded on December 31, 2016.

==== Solo activities ====
In 2020, Kimura released his first solo album, entitled "Go with the Flow". The album, which included songs written for Kimura by well-known bands and artists such as [ALEXANDROS], Superfly, Noriyuki Makihara, and Love Psychedelico, debuted at #1 on the Oricon Albums Chart on the week of its release. A month later, he held a four-day tour in both Tokyo and Osaka entitled "TAKUYA KIMURA Live Tour 2020 Go with the Flow". The concert was released on Blu-Ray and DVD, on July 8, 2020, debuting at #1 as well on the Oricon Charts.

On May 20, 2021, the Weibo Starlight Awards 2020 ceremony was held online. Kimura, alongside his two daughters, Cocomi and Kōki, were awarded alongside Western artists such as Katy Perry, Taylor Swift, and Louis Koo.

A follow-up to his solo album "Go with the Flow" was released on January 19, 2022, entitled "Next Destination". The album features the song entitled "Mojo Drive", a collaboration between Kimura and renowned city-pop artist Tatsuro Yamashita, who wanted to write a song to highlight Kimura's baritone voice after attending his solo concert in February. Yamashita also composed two other tracks, namely "Good Luck, Good Time", and "Morning Dew" for the album. In addition to Yamashita, "Next Destination" also features songs written by Kyōka Suzuki, Sanma Akashiya, Man with a Mission, and Shigesato Itoi.

From February to March 2022, he held an eight-day tour entitled "TAKUYA KIMURA Live Tour 2022 Next Destination" across Hyogo, Hiroshima, Aichi, and Yokohama. The concert was released on Blu-Ray and DVD on August 3, 2022, ranking first in three video categories on the Oricon Weekly Video Rankings.

August 14, 2024, marked the release of Kimura's third solo album, entitled "See You There". The album includes 11 tracks written for Kimura by prominent Japanese artists such as Ryota Yanagisawa of SUPER BEAVER, Toshinobu Kubota, Kazuki of s**t kingz, Takuro Yoshida, and Tsuyoshi Domoto of KinKi Kids. Mariya Takeuchi, best known for the globally popular city-pop song Plastic Love, provided the song "Lovers in October" for the album. In an interview, Takeuchi revealed that her intention when writing the song was, "Because Takuya is in his 50s, I want him to sing a boyish, heart-melting love song."

The album debuted at number one on the Billboard Japan Weekly Album Sales chart, Top Albums Sales, selling 56,236 copies on the week of its release. With this achievement, Kimura secured three consecutive album debuts at the top of the Billboard Charts, following his previous two solo releases. On September 29, Kimura began another eight-day concert tour entitled "TAKUYA KIMURA Live Tour 2024 SEE YOU THERE". The tour ran until December 25, 2024, at Fukuoka.

The tour’s concert film, which features the October 14, 2024 performance held at the Yokohama Arena, was released on Blu-ray and DVD on July 2, 2025. It debuted at No. 1 on both the Oricon Weekly DVD and Blu-ray Disc Rankings, with first-week sales of 11,000 DVDs and 16,000 Blu-rays. It also topped the Oricon Weekly Music DVD & Blu-ray Ranking, with combined sales of 27,000 copies, marking Kimura's third consecutive release to achieve No. 1 across all three video categories.

On May 3, 2026, it was announced that Kimura would leave his longtime record label, Victor Entertainment, and sign with the newly established private label C&C STAGE under Avex Music Creative. The label was established with a focus on Kimura’s creative vision, aiming to develop new forms of entertainment centered around music. Following the move, Kimura stated that he planned to expand his musical activities and continue releasing new content through the label.

On May 29, 2026, Kimura announced his fourth solo studio album, "Checkpoint". According to the announcement, the album’s title reflects Kimura’s current career milestone while symbolizing a new step toward the future. The album is also set to feature collaborations with Tamio Okuda, Atsuki Kimura of Yudakan, Taka of ONE OK ROCK, Rei, and Masayoshi Yamazaki. In a statement, Kimura said that he hoped Checkpoint would strengthen the connection between himself and his audience, adding that he was also working on songs for future live performances.

The same announcement confirmed the TAKUYA KIMURA Live Tour 2026 Checkpoint, scheduled to run from September to November 2026. The tour will comprise nine performances across five cities: Hyogo, Fukuoka, Chiba, Seoul, and Taipei. The Seoul and Taipei dates will mark Kimura’s first overseas solo concerts since beginning his solo career. Kimura said he was looking forward to performing for overseas audiences after receiving requests from fans abroad asking him to perform internationally.

=== Acting ===
In 1988, Kimura made his acting debut in a television series, Abunai Shonen III, along with his band members. After appearing in several television series, he first attracted attention after landing a role in a high-rated television series, The Ordinary People (Asunaro Hakusho), in 1993. The scene where he hugged his co-star Hikari Ishida from behind became popular in Japan and a man hugging a girl from behind was later named "asunaro daki", meaning "asunaro hug". From 1994, men in Japan started copying his fashion and style, as clothes and fashion items became instant hits, the thick, black-rimmed glasses he wore in The Ordinary People, being one of them. The phenomenon was collectively called the "Kimutaku syndrome". He won the Ishihara Yujiro New Artist Award for his performance in Shoot, in which he made his screen debut.

He first landed the lead role in Long Vacation in 1996. The series, which aired every Monday night, saw massive success and was the highest-rated program that year, thus becoming a social phenomenon. Media stated that, "women disappear from the city on Mondays", pointing out the large viewership and how intoxicating the show was for women in Japan. After Kimura played a young pianist, there was a rapid increase of young men who started taking piano lessons. The cultural impact and influences of the show is commonly referred to as the "Lonvaca (ron-bake) phenomenon". This was also a breakthrough for Kimura as an actor and helped him gain recognition and a more broad fan base.

The following year, Kimura starred with Long Vacation costar Takako Matsu in Love Generation as squabbling colleagues who eventually fall in love. The series was a hit, achieving a high rating of 30.8%. In 2000, he starred in the television series Beautiful Life as a hairdresser who falls for a woman in a wheelchair. The series became a massive hit, with the final episode marking above the 40% household share rating and becoming the highest-rated program for that slot (Sunday 9:00pm).

In 2001, Kimura reunited with Takako Matsu in the legal drama Hero as a public prosecutor, which became the all-time highest-rated television series in Japan and the only program in history to have all episodes mark above the 30% household share rating. The success of the series led to a second season and two feature films. Subsequent television series, such as Good Luck!!, Pride and Engine, also generated high-ratings.

In 2004, he played a supporting role in a Cannes-nominated film 2046, and walked the red carpet of Cannes Festival for the first time. Kimura also voiced Howl Pendragon, the titular character of Studio Ghibli's Howl's Moving Castle in 2004. He was the lead actor in Love and Honor (2006). Although he was nominated for numerous prestigious awards for Love and Honor, including the Japan Academy Award, his agency, Johnny & Associates, declined all nominations, though some organizations still announced him as the winner, such as the Tokyo Sports Film Awards, headed by Takeshi Kitano and Cinema Junpo. Earning over 40.3 billion yen, the film became the biggest hit for director Yoji Yamada during his four-decade career, as well as becoming the biggest box-office earner in Shochiku's history. That year, People Magazine named Kimura in its 2006 "Sexiest Man Alive" list in the category "International Males: Hot Around the Globe".

In Blade of the Immortal (2017), Takashi Miike cast Kimura for the role as he found him fitting due to Kimura's personal life and the differences he has with the other members of the music group SMAP. Additionally, since Kimura was also popular within Japanese fandom for over two decades by the time the film was made, he felt that his appeal would attract a bigger audience. When Miike asked his team about what they thought of Kimura playing the role of Manji, the team reacted negatively, believing that he would not be able to portray Manji. However, Miike still felt that due to Kimura's experience in films, he has suitable to play the leading role in the movie.

He said that he personally selected Kimura, "a superstar who made the transition from the Showa era to the Heisei era," as "the world's strongest member of the Miike Gang, the Ittō-ryū fighting school of our film industry." Kimura expressed multiple thoughts about his acting as Manji, such as how he deals with make up and action sequences. However, Kimura suffered a major wound while filming, resulting in him not being able to walk for various days. Blade of the Immortal was eventually screened out-of-competition at the Cannes Festival, making this Kimura's second appearance at the event.

In 2021, it was announced that Kimura would be starring in the television adaption of German author Frank Schätzing's environmental thriller, The Swarm.

In 2022, Kimura was announced to star as historical figure Oda Nobunaga alongside Haruka Ayase as Nohime in The Legend and Butterfly, a film to commemorate Toei's 70th Anniversary in 2023. This is the first time Kimura has portrayed Nobunaga in 25 years, following his first appearance as the 16th century samurai in the 1998 historical drama "Nobunaga Oda: The Fool Who Takes The World" for TBS. The film was released on January 27, 2023, and is directed by Keishi Otomo and written by Ryota Kosawa. On November 6, 2022, Kimura made an appearance dressed as Nobunaga at the annual Gifu Nobunaga Festival alongside fellow actor Hideaki Ito on horseback. The festival drew in half-a-million people, more than the city's population, with many hoping to catch a glimpse of Kimura.

In 2024, Kimura reprised his role of Natsuki Obana from the critically acclaimed TBS television series La Grand Maison Tokyo, for its feature-length movie sequel entitled La Grande Maison Paris, set to premiere at the upcoming San Sebastián International Film Festival. Kimura is joined by popular Korean actor and rapper from K-Pop group 2PM, Ok Taec-yeon, who remarked, “I was very excited to be able to appear in a project with Kimura Takuya, whom I admire, and it was an honor to be able to be a part of a great project." Kimura also dyed his hair blonde in honor of Japanese chef, Kei Kobayashi, who supervised the culinary scenes for the film. As part of promotion for La Grande Maison Paris, Kimura and fellow co-star Yuta Tamamori of Kis-My-Ft2, made a surprise appearance at the 2025 Michelin Guide Ceremony, held in Tokyo on October 17, 2024. Kimura announced the three-star restaurants and presented them with plaques, and Tamamori presented them with chef jackets. On February 6, 2025, it was announced that the film had drawn approximately 2.44 million viewers in its 38 days in theaters, earning over 3.5 billion yen at the box office. As of March 3, 2025, the film has grossed over 4 billion yen, drawing 2.79 million viewers in 63 days. Owing to its success, Grand Maison Paris is set to release in Thailand, Hong Kong, South Korea, France, and other global markets in the coming months.

In 2025, Japanese entertainment company Shochiku announced that Kimura, alongside Chieko Baisho, would star in renowned director Yoji Yamada’s latest film, Tokyo Taxi. Scheduled for release on November 21, 2025, the film is a Japanese remake of the 2022 French-Belgian movie Driving Madeleine. Tokyo Taxi serves as the centerpiece of Shochiku’s 130th anniversary celebration and marks Kimura’s reunion with Yamada after 19 years, their last collaboration being the critically acclaimed Love and Honor in 2006. It also commemorates 21 years since Kimura and Baisho previously co-starred together in the 2004 animated classic Howl’s Moving Castle.

=== Television ===
As a member of the boy band SMAP, he used to co-host a weekly variety show SMAPxSMAP for 20 years until the group's dissolution on New Year's Eve 2016. They welcomed a number of international celebrities such as Michael Jackson, Madonna and Lady Gaga as well as Japanese guests. He has also occasionally made cameo appearances in other shows, such as on Netflix's Jimmy: The True Story of a True Idiot, and has been a guest on numerous variety shows.

Since 2003, Kimura hosts an annual variety show entitled Santaku alongside comedian Sanma Akashiya to commemorate the start of a New Year. However, in 2017, it was broadcast in April due to the official disbanding of the SMAP on New Year's Eve of the previous year.

In 2018 he began hosting an online variety show Kimura-saaan! on the application GYAO! where he does various activities in response to requests from listeners through his radio program Kimura Takuya Flow. The program ended in 2023 however in January 2024, he launched a YouTube channel as a continuation of the web series. In addition to new videos, videos that were previously streamed on GYAO! are also posted on the channel. As of December 2025, Kimura has amassed over 2.09M subscribers on his channel.

=== Gaming ===
Early in the development of action game Judgment, the developers at Sega and Ryu Ga Gotoku Studio considered using a famous actor to portray the lead Takayuki Yagami.

Series creator and writer Toshihiro Nagoshi was afraid audiences would accuse them of toning down the character due to Kimura's popularity. However, Kimura was open to the team's suggestions and worked with the developers to hone the character. Sega was pleased with Kimura's performance, noting he needed far fewer retakes during recording than they anticipated. Some lines were rewritten to better fit Kimura's delivery, but the writers ensured these changes would not deviate from Yagami's personality. The game's dialogue was recorded in chronological order so players would feel Kimura's voice evolving as Yagami's character develops during the story. Kimura enjoyed his work on the game, and Nagoshi remarked on Kimura's quick response to his messages. In contrast with previous Yakuza titles, the game was not recorded until after the whole scenario was written, which helped Kimura and the other actors.

Kimura reprised his role as Yagami in the sequel to Judgment, entitled Lost Judgment released on September 24, 2021. He announced the sequel alongside Nagoshi during an event titled "Judgment Day." In a video interview promoting the game with Director Nagoshi, Kimura recalled his surprise when actresses on set for various TV dramas and films would discreetly whisper to him that they had played the first Judgment.

Due to Kimura's popularity, Japanese players have often nicknamed the Judgment series Kimutaku ga Gotoku (キムタクが如く; lit. "Like KimuTaku"), referencing the Yakuza series' Japanese title Ryū ga Gotoku (龍が如く; lit. "Like a Dragon").

== Personal life ==
Kimura married singer Shizuka Kudo on December 5, 2000. They have two daughters: Cocomi, born on May 1, 2001; and Mitsuki, born on February 5, 2003.

== Other ventures ==
=== Product endorsement ===
As a member of SMAP, Kimura alongside his bandmates were former ambassadors for telecommunications conglomerate SoftBank. He is also well known for being the previous brand ambassador for the Japanese men's grooming brand GATSBY, promoting its iconic Moving Rubber series. Kimura has been the brand ambassador for several other well-known brands, such as Suntory, Levi's, LINE, and Nikon. He is also known for starring in a series of ads for Toyota, alongside Takeshi Kitano and Hugh Jackman. Kimura and Kitano portray Oda Nobunaga and Toyotomi Hideyoshi, while Jackman portrays the sailor Marco Polo. Together with Beyoncé, Kimura served as the brand ambassador for Japanese fashion brand Samantha Thavasa.

As of 2021, Kimura is the current brand ambassador for McDonald's in Japan, and car manufacturer Nissan. In 2021, he partnered with Ray-Ban to produce two lines of special Ray-Ban Aviators and Wayfarers, with his initials engraved by hand. Kimura was appointed as the ambassador for the HUAWEI WATCH GT 5 Pro in April 2025. This collaboration has since expanded to include the WATCH GT 6 Pro.

== Filmography ==
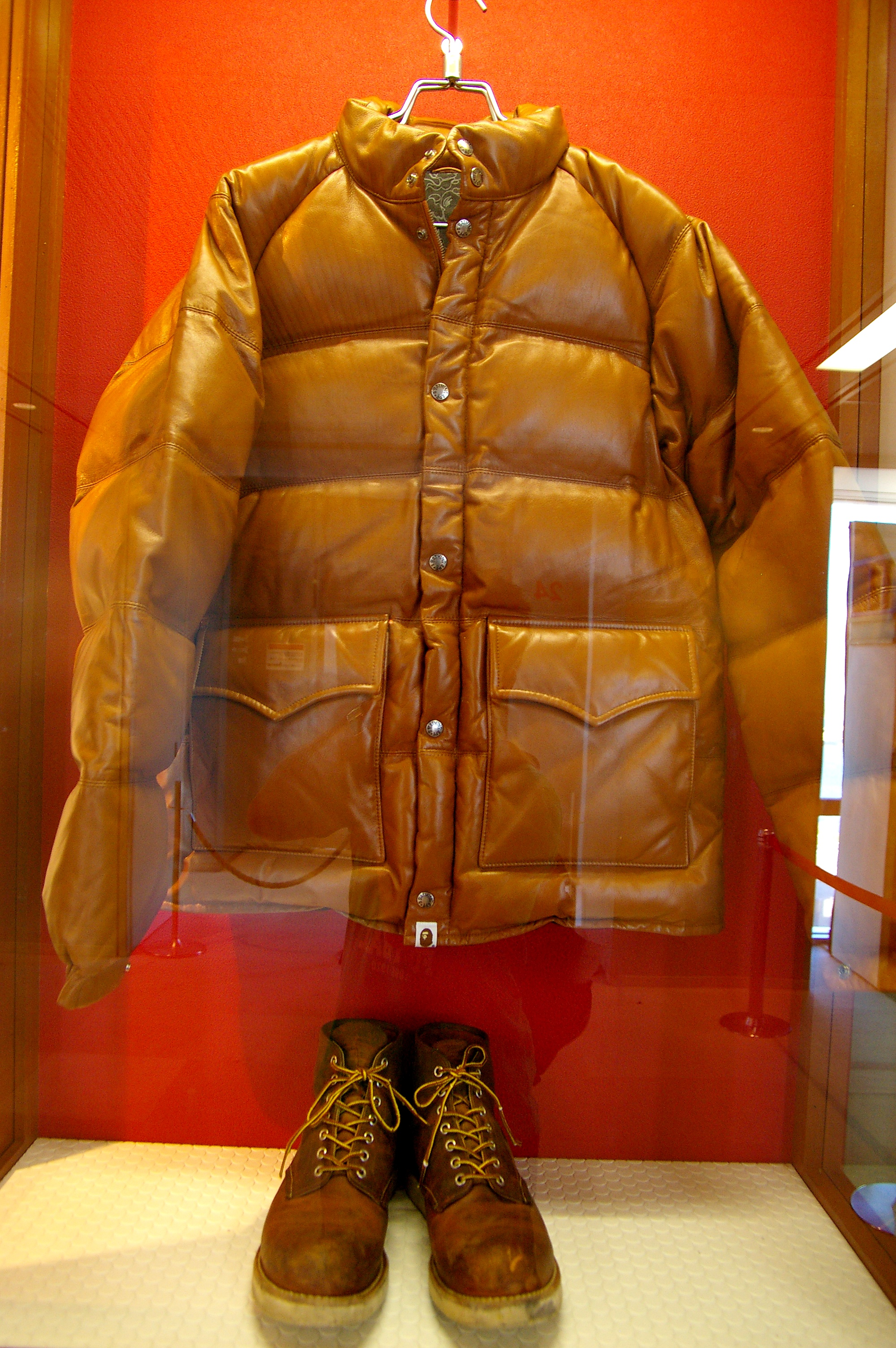
Kimura Takuya's costume in Hero

=== Film ===
| Year | Title | Role | Notes | Ref. |
|---|---|---|---|---|
| 1994 | Shoot! | Yoshiharu Kubo | Leading role | |
| 1995 | Fly Boys, Fly | Jyunichiro Ueda | Leading role | |
| 2004 | 2046 | Taku | Hong Kong film | |
| 2004 | Howl's Moving Castle | Howl (voice) | Leading role | |
| 2006 | Love and Honor | Shinosuke Mimura | Leading role | |
| 2007 | Hero | Kohei Kuryu | Leading role | |
| 2009 | I Come with the Rain | Shitao | French film | |
| 2010 | Redline | JP (voice) | Leading role | |
| 2010 | Space Battleship Yamato | Susumu Kodai | Leading role | |
| 2015 | Hero | Kohei Kuryu | Leading role | |
| 2017 | Blade of the Immortal | Manji | Leading role | |
| 2018 | Killing for the Prosecution | Takeshi Mogami | Leading role | |
| 2019 | Masquerade Hotel | Kōsuke Nitta | Leading role | |
| 2020 | Doraemon: Nobita's New Dinosaur | Jill (voice) | | |
| 2021 | Masquerade Night | Kōsuke Nitta | Leading role | |
| 2023 | The Legend and Butterfly | Oda Nobunaga | Leading role | |
| 2023 | The Boy and the Heron | Shoichi Maki (voice) | Special appearance | |
| 2024 | La Grande Maison Paris | Natsuki Obana | Leading role | |
| 2025 | Tokyo Taxi | Koji Usami | | |
| 2026 | Kyojo: Reunion | Kimichika Kazama | Leading role | |
| 2026 | Kyojo: Requiem | Kimichika Kazama | Leading role | |

=== Television (as actor) ===
| Year | Title | Role | Notes | Ref. |
|---|---|---|---|---|
| 1988–1989 | Abunai Shonen III | Himself | Leading role | |
| 1990 | Jikan Desuyo | | | |
| 1990 | Ototo | Hekiro | | |
| 1991 | Rugby Yattete Yokatta | Masaki Hirai | | |
| 1991 | Romeo and Juliet | Romeo | Leading role; short drama | |
| 1991 | Sukinanoni | Eiichi Tamura | | |
| 1992 | Matenro wa Barairo ni | Noboru Misawa | Short drama | |
| 1992 | Tales of the Unusual: season 3 | Inakamono | Leading role; short drama | |
| 1992 | Shojo Ijyou Shounen Miman | Yuichi Konno | | |
| 1992 | Motto, Tokimeki wo | Himself | Guest appearance | |
| 1992 | Sono toki Heartwa Nusumareta | Masato Katase | | |
| 1993 | Boku dake no Megami | Takeshi | | |
| 1993 | Izu no Odoriko | Kawasaki | Mini-series | |
| 1993 | Asunaro Hakusho | Osamu Toride | | |
| 1994 | Kimi ni Tsutaetai | Toru Yamashita | | |
| 1994 | Wakamono no Subete | Takeshi Ueda | | |
| 1995 | Kimi wa Toki no Kanata e | Motoyasu Matsudaira | Leading role; television film | |
| 1995 | Jinsei wa Jyojyoda | Kazuma Ooue | | |
| 1995 | Tales of the Unusual: Spring 1995 | Oshimoto | Leading role; short drama | |
| 1996 | Furuhata Ninzaburo | Isao Hayashi | Episode 17 | |
| 1996 | Long Vacation | Hidetoshi Sena | Leading role | |
| 1996 | Concerto | Kakeru Takakura | | |
| 1997 | Boku ga Boku de Arutame ni | Riki Kurosawa | Leading role | |
| 1997 | Gift | Yukio Hayasaka | Leading role | |
| 1997 | Ii Hito | Yukio Hayasaka | Guest appearance | |
| 1997 | Love Generation | Teppei Katakiri | Leading role | |
| 1998 | Oda Nobunaga: Tenka wo Totta Baka | Nobunaga Oda | Leading role; television film | |
| 1998 | Nemureru Mori | Naoki Ito | Leading role | |
| 1999 | Furuhata Ninzaburo vs SMAP | Himself | | |
| 1999 | Tales of the Unusual: Spring 1999 | Kimio | Leading role; short drama | |
| 1999 | Konya wa Eigyouchu | Himself | Leading role | |
| 2000 | Beautiful Life | Shuji Okishima | Leading role | |
| 2000 | Densetsu no Kyoushi | Yoji Mizutani | Guest appearance; episode 11 | |
| 2000 | Food Fight | Kyutaro (voice) | | |
| 2001 | Hero | Kohei Kuryu | Leading role | |
| 2001 | Chūshingura 1/47 | Yasube Horibe | Leading role; television film | |
| 2001 | Tales of the Unusual: SMAP Special | Naoki Yunomoto | Leading role; short drama | |
| 2002 | Hundred Million Stars from the Sky | Ryo Katase | Leading role | |
| 2003 | Good Luck!! | Hajime Shinkai | Leading role | |
| 2004 | Pride | Haru Satonaka | Leading role | |
| 2004 | X’smap | Ajii | Leading role | |
| 2005 | Engine | Jiro Shinzaki | Leading role | |
| 2006 | Saiyūki | Genyokudaiou | Guest appearance; episode 1 | |
| 2006 | Hero SP | Kohei Kuryu | Leading role; television film | |
| 2007 | The Family | Teppei Manpyo | Leading role | |
| 2008 | Change! | Asakura Keita | Leading role | |
| 2009 | Goro's Bar | Takuya | Cameo appearance | |
| 2009 | Mr. Brain | Ryusuke Tsukumo | Leading role | |
| 2009 | Kochi Kame | Takubo | Cameo appearance; episode 8 | |
| 2010 | Tsuki no Koibito Moon Lovers | Rensuke Hazuki | Leading role | |
| 2010 | Dokutomato Satsujin Jiken | Himself | Leading role | |
| 2011 | Antarctica | Takeshi Kuramochi | Leading role | |
| 2012 | Priceless | Fumio Kindaichi | Leading role | |
| 2013 | Furuhata vs SMAP The Aftermath | Himself | Leading role | |
| 2013 | Andō Lloyd: A.I. knows Love? | Ando Roido | Leading role | |
| 2014 | Oretachi ni Asu wa aru | Himself | | |
| 2014 | Sazae-san | Himself (voice) | Episode 7148: “Recipe for a Smile” | |
| 2014 | Miyamoto Musashi | Musashi Miyamoto | Leading role; mini-series | |
| 2014 | Gokuaku Gambo | Kohei Kuryu | Guest appearance; episode 11 | |
| 2014 | Hero 2 | Kohei Kuryu | Leading role | |
| 2015 | I'm Home | Hisashi Ieji | Leading role | |
| 2017 | A Life: A Love | Kazuaki Okita | Leading role | |
| 2018 | BG Personal Bodyguard - Season 1 | Akira Shimazaki | Leading role | |
| 2018 | Jimmy: The True Story of a True Idiot | Comedian | Cameo appearance | |
| 2019 | La Grande Maison Tokyo | Natsuki Obana | Leading role | |
| 2020 | BG Personal Bodyguard - Season 2 | Akira Shimazaki | Leading role | |
| 2020 | Kyojo | Kimichika Kazama | Leading role; mini-series | |
| 2021 | Kyojo 2 | Kimichika Kazama | Leading role; mini-series | |
| 2022 | 10 Count to the Future | Shōgo Kirisawa | Leading role | |
| 2023 | The Swarm | Mifune | | |
| 2023 | Kazama Kimichika: Kyojo Zero | Kimichika Kazama | Leading role | |
| 2024 | Believe: A Bridge to You | Riku Kariyama | Leading role | |
| 2024 | La Grande Maison Tokyo Special | Natsuki Obana | Leading role; television film | |

=== Television (as personality) ===
| Year | Title | Role | Notes |
|---|---|---|---|
| 1995–2015 | Sanma&SMAP | Himself (host) | TV special; 21 episodes |
| 1996–2016 | SMAPxSMAP | Himself (host, chef, performer) | |
| 2000–2001 | TV's High | Himself | Host |
| 2001–2015 | SmaStation | Himself | Guest appearance |
| 2003–present | SanTaku | Himself (host) | TV special; 13 episodes |
| 2007–2016 | Baby Smap | Himself (host) | |
| 2018–2023 | Kimura Saaaan! | Himself (host) | Online variety show on GYAO! |

=== Radio ===
| Year | Title | Role | Notes |
|---|---|---|---|
| 1995–2018 | What's Up SMAP | Himself (host) | |
| 2018–present | Kimura Takuya: FLOW | Himself (host) | |

=== Theatre ===
| Year | Title | Role | Notes |
|---|---|---|---|
| 1989 | Modoken | | |
| 1991 | Saint Seiya | Kaio Poseidon / Julian Solo | Main role |
| 1992 | Dragon Quest | | Main role |
| 1992 | Hanakage no Hana | | |
| 1993 | Another | | Main role |
| 1994 | Shareo-Tachi | | |

=== Video games ===
| Year | Title | Role | Notes |
|---|---|---|---|
| 2018 | Judgment | Takayuki Yagami | Main role |
| 2021 | Lost Judgment | Takayuki Yagami | Main role |

== Discography ==
Solo albums

- Go with the Flow (2020)
- Next Destination (2022)
- See You There (2024)

== Concert tours ==
- Takuya Kimura Live Tour 2020 Go with the Flow (February 2020)
- Takuya Kimura Live Tour 2022 Next Destination (February–March 2022)
- Takuya Kimura Live Tour 2024 See You There (September–December 2024)
- Takuya Kimura Live Tour 2026 Checkpoint (September–November 2026)

== Awards ==
| Institution | Year | Award | Work | Result | Ref. |
|---|---|---|---|---|---|
| Blue Ribbon Awards | 2006 | Best Actor | Love and Honor | Declined nomination | |
| Blue Ribbon Awards | 2026 | Best Actor | Tokyo Taxi | Pending | |
| Broadcasting Culture Fund Award | 2000 | Best Actor | Beautiful Life | Won | |
| Elan d'Or Award | 1994 | Newcomer of the Year | Shoot! | Won | |
| Galaxy Award | 1995 | Individual Performance | Wakamono no Subete | Won | |
| Japan Academy Film Prize | 2007 | Best Actor | Love and Honor | Declined nomination | |
| Hochi Film Award | 2021 | Best Actor | Masquerade Night | Won | |
| Japan Jeans Makers Association | 1994 | Best Jeanist | Himself | Won | |
| Japan Jeans Makers Association | 1995 | Best Jeanist | Himself | Won | |
| Japan Jeans Makers Association | 1996 | Best Jeanist | Himself | Won | |
| Japan Jeans Makers Association | 1997 | Best Jeanist | Himself | Won | |
| Japan Jeans Makers Association | 1998 | Best Jeanist (Hall of Fame) | Himself | Won | |
| Nikkan Sports Drama Grand Prix | 1998 | Best Actor | Love Generation | Won | |
| Nikkan Sports Drama Grand Prix | 1999 | Best Actor | Beautiful Life | Won | |
| Nikkan Sports Drama Grand Prix | 2001 | Best Actor | Hero | Won | |
| Nikkan Sports Drama Grand Prix | 2003 | Best Actor | Good Luck!! | Won | |
| Nikkan Sports Film Awards | 1994 | Ishihara Yujiro New Artist | Shoot! | Won | |
| Nikkan Sports Film Awards | 2006 | Best Actor | Love and Honor | Won | |
| Nikkan Sports Film Awards | 2025 | Best Actor | Tokyo Taxi | Pending | |
| Seoul Drama Awards | 2007 | Best performance (Leading role) | The Family | Won | |
| Tokyo Sports Film Awards | 2006 | Best Actor | Love and Honor | Won | |
| TV Life Annual Drama Awards | 1993 | Best Supporting Actor | The Ordinary People | Won | |
| TV Life Annual Drama Awards | 1996 | Best Actor | Long Vacation | Won | |
| TV Life Annual Drama Awards | 1997 | Best Actor | Love Generation | Won | |
| TV Life Annual Drama Awards | 2000 | Best Actor | Beautiful Life | Won | |
| TV Life Annual Drama Awards | 2001 | Best Actor | Hero | Won | |
| TV Life Annual Drama Awards | 2002 | Best Supporting Actor | Hundred Million Stars From the Sky | Won | |
| TV Navi Drama of the Year | 2007 | Best performance (Leading role) | The Family | Won | |
| TV Navi Drama of the Year | 2013 | Best performance (Leading role) | Ando Lloyd: A.I. knows Love? | Won | |
| NAVGTR Awards | 2019 | NAVGTR Performance in a Drama, Lead | Judgment | Nominated | |
| Famitsu Dengeki Game Awards | 2021 | Best Actor | Lost Judgment | Won | |

== Publications ==
- Kai-Ho-Ku (April 24, 2003) ISBN 978-4087803778
- Kai-Ho-Ku 2 (September 30, 2011) ISBN 978-4087806137
- Kimura Takuya (1996) ISBN 978-4533026430
- Percentage (November 11, 2006) ISBN 978-4838717262
- Kimura Takuya x Men's Non-No Endless (September 30, 2011) ISBN 978-4087806144
