= Love Generation (TV series) =

1997 Japanese television series

- Title screen
- Japanese: ラブ ジェネレーション
- Genre: Drama; Romance
- Created by: Koiwai Hiroyoshi (小岩井宏悦)
- Starring: Takuya Kimura; Takako Matsu
- Music by: Cagnet
- Opening theme: Shiawase na Ketsumatsu 幸せな結末 A Happy Ending by Eiichi Ohtaki
- Country of origin: Japan
- Original language: Japanese
- No. of episodes: 11

Production
- Running time: 54 minutes

Original release
- Network: Fuji TV
- Release: October 13 – December 22, 1997

Love Generation (ラブ ジェネレーション, Rabu Jenerēshon) is a Japanese television drama series starring Takuya Kimura and Takako Matsu. It aired on Fuji TV from October 13, 1997 to December 22, 1997, every Monday. The plot revolves around the relationship of the two young protagonists, Katagiri Teppei and Uesugi Riko, who begin as squabbling colleagues before inevitably falling in love.

It enjoyed a very high rating of 30.8% and features music by Cagnet. The theme song was "Shiawase na Ketsumatsu" (幸せな結末; "A Happy Ending") by Eiichi Ohtaki.

== Cast ==
- Takuya Kimura as Katagiri Teppei

A talented advertisement designer and a playboy with an egocentric attitude and dislike for mediocrity. He starts a relationship with Riko but still misses his past girlfriend Sanae.

- Takako Matsu as Uesugi Riko

A secretary who works in the same department as Teppei. Hoping to become more independent, she moved away from her family in Nagano to Tokyo. She has a lot of spirit and eventually becomes part of a love triangle.

- Norika Fujiwara as Takagi Erika

A flight attendant and Riko's best friend. While she secretly likes Teppei, she frequently gives helpful advice to Riko to help her maintain her relationship.

- Masaaki Uchino as Katagiri Soichiro

A prosecutor and Teppei's brother. He is very serious in his doings unlike Teppei, and thus Soichiro is his brother's role model. He was engaged to Sanae, Teppei's former girlfriend, but he meets his own past girlfriend and develops an affair with her later on in the story.

- Risa Junna as Mizuhara Sanae

A translator of Mandarin and Japanese. She was Teppei's high school sweetheart. She becomes engaged to his brother Soichiro, but later finds herself falling in love with Teppei again.

- Ryuuta Kawabata as Yoshimoto

Teppei's high school friend, who falls in love with Riko at first sight, and is rejected by her.

== Synopsis ==
Katagiri Teppei is a talented designer, popular amongst women. Unfortunately, Teppei, who despises conformity, is forced to transfer from the design department to the sales department of his company as a result of his egocentric behavior. Throughout the series, he is compelled to adapt to his new working environment, which includes cutting his long hair to create a 'more professional' image.

As he struggles to adjust, he meets Uesugi Riko. While she apparently does not like him at first, she eventually falls for him. At the same time, Teppei runs into his high school sweetheart, Mizuhara Sanae, whom he still has feelings for, but discovers to his surprise that she is now engaged to his older brother Soichiro. Riko is there to console him, and this eventually blooms into an awkward romance.

Soon after, however, Sanae herself realizes she also still has feelings for Teppei, and thus creates a love triangle. To make the matter more complicated, Soichiro starts to have an affair with a past girlfriend of his own.

== Symbols ==
=== Crystal apple ===
The crystal apple makes frequent appearances throughout the series.

Teppei's apartment has many unusual items such as a Thai artifact, a 30-year-old refrigerator, and a crystal apple. The meaning of the apple is unclear—it could be the apple that tempted Eve, or it could represent the true love between Adam and Eve. Crystal is also very fragile, and shows anything seen through it upside down. The image in the apple is seen upside down for 10 of the 11 episodes; at the end of last episode, however, it is no longer upside down. The apple was also used on the album cover of Love Generation's soundtrack.

=== True love never runs smooth ===
This advertising slogan appears over and over again in the drama. It is a version of the famous quote from Shakespeare's A Midsummer Night's Dream Act 1 Scene 1: "The course of true love never did run smooth", and characterises the relationship between Riko and Teppei, who face constant difficulties throughout. The advertisement is visible everywhere, from the local park to Teppei's 30-year-old refrigerator --- "True love never runs smooth" is the unofficial tagline of this TV series.

== Awards ==
Year	Award	Category	Recipient	Result	Ref.
1997	Nikkan Sports Drama Grand Prix	Best Drama	Love Generation	Won	
1997	Nikkan Sports Drama Grand Prix	Best Actor	Takuya Kimura	Won	
1997	15th Television Drama Academy Awards	Best Actor	Takuya Kimura	Won	
