= Beautiful Life (Japanese TV series) =

Japanese television series

- Japanese: ビューティフルライフ
- Genre: Drama; Romance
- Written by: Eriko Kitagawa
- Directed by: Nobuhiro Doi
- Starring: Takuya Kimura; Takako Tokiwa
- Opening theme: Kon'ya Tsuki no Mieru Oka ni by B'z
- Country of origin: Japan
- Original language: Japanese
- No. of episodes: 11

Original release
- Network: TBS Television
- Release: January 16 – March 26, 2000

Beautiful Life (ビューティフルライフ, Byūtifuru Raifu) was a Japanese television drama series starring Takuya Kimura and Takako Tokiwa. It aired on TBS Television from 16 January to 26 March 2000.

Beautiful Life was a massive success, achieving a TV rating of 41.3%, the first drama in 17 years in Japan to achieve a rating of 40% and the second highest rated drama episode in Japanese history, only surpassed by Hanzawa Naoki in 2013 (42.2%).

== Cast ==
- Takuya Kimura (木村 拓哉 ) as Shuji Okishima

A hairstylist. His father wanted him to take over the Okishima hospital but he ignored his family. He becomes a Top Stylist (one of the best hairstylists in the salon where he works) and is occasionally picked up in magazines.

- Takako Tokiwa (常盤 貴子) as Kyoko Machida

Works at a library. Her disease first started manifesting itself when she was 17 and since then she has had to use a wheelchair.

- Miki Mizuno (水野 美紀) as Sachie Tamura

Kyoko's best friend who also works at the library. She often offers encouragement to Kyoko.

- Hiroyuki Ikeuchi as Takumi Okabe

Shuji's assistant. He respects Shuji.

- Atsuro Watabe (渡部 篤郎) as Masao Machida

Kyoko's brother. He lives with his parents and works at the liquor store they own. He is close to Kyoko and is protective of her.

- Takanori Nishikawa (西川 貴教 ) (T.M.Revolution) as Satoru Kawamura

A hairstylist. He works at the same shop as Shuji and is a very popular person.

- Koji Matoba as Kozo Miyama

A volunteer. He likes Kyoko and often comes to the library.

- Chiaki Hara as Mayumi Ozawa

Another Top Stylist. She works at the same shop as Shuji.

- Koyuki (加藤 小雪) as Nakajima Satsuki

== Plot ==
One day, Shuji on his motorbike and Kyoko in her car meet at the crossroads—they get into a small argument over her driving. They don't have any interest in each other at that moment but at the library where Kyoko works. Shuji sees Kyoko using a wheelchair. That was how they first met. They begin to talk and Kyoko feels regarded because Shuji never looked at her as a disabled person. Gradually, her feelings change and she waits for Shuji to come to the library.

Shuji works as a hairstylist at a popular hair salon called HOT LIP. A fashion magazine asks the salon to choose its best haircut for an article, and the owner says that both Shuji and Satoru should find a cut model themselves and that he will choose the best haircut. After some thought, Shuji asks Kyoko to be his cut model. She first says no, worried about her appearance and her disability, but Shuji tells her that he will be her ‘barrier free’ so she does not need to be anxious about it.

Shuji's haircut is chosen for the magazine, but Kyoko feels ashamed when she sees it. Everyone thinks the magazine chose Shuji's design because Kyoko was in a wheelchair in the photo, just because of the 'impact' it makes. But soon, Sachie tells Kyoko she shouldn't care about her appearance.

Satoru feels jealous of Shuji because Shuji is becoming more popular. Satoru steals Shuji's haircut design and says it is his, But Shuji becomes a Top Stylist so he forgets about the stealing.

Over time, Shuji and Kyoko grow closer, though, Kyoko does not trust Shuji from her heart. Shuji is now the best hairstylist at HOT LIP and is very busy. As a result, despite them growing closer, they do not have time to see each other.

Sachie and Masao are getting close too. At first, they are both scared to speak because they like each other, but slowly, they get to know each other.

Kyoko is worried because she and Shuji live in completely different worlds. She thinks about breaking up with him. On the other hand, Takumi was resisting Shuji but he realizes that Shuji was the one who was right and forgets about all the jealousy.

Sachie gets pregnant but Masao tells her he cannot marry yet because he is worried about Kyoko's disease. Kyoko's mother tells Shuji about her disease that she doesn't know how much of her life is left and she can die at any time.

The story is getting closer to the end now and Kyoko's condition is getting very bad. She is told to enter the hospital but soon after, knowing that it is not good for her body, she leaves the hospital and starts to live together with Shuji. Masao, Sachie, and Kyoko's parents all support Shuji and Kyoko.

Her sickness is getting worse every day. But one day, Shuji takes part in a fashion show as a hairstylist. Kyoko asks if she could go and see the show but her brother Masao and Sachie both tell her that her body will not be able to bear it. But in the end, the three of them go to the show.

Kyoko faints while watching the show and she is carried to the hospital. Soon, she passes away.

The series ends with a scene from a few years later. Shuji has opened a hair salon at the seaside and is living with the memory of Kyoko.

== Release ==
The series was broadcast on Sunday nights at primetime, which was not traditional for drama shows, which tended to be broadcast during weekdays, with Sundays reserved for family and variety programmes.

== Awards ==
Year	Award	Category	Recipient	Result	Ref.
2000	3rd Nikkan Sports Drama Grand Prix	Best Drama	Beautiful Life	Won	
2000	3rd Nikkan Sports Drama Grand Prix	Best Actor	Takuya Kimura	Won	
2000	3rd Nikkan Sports Drama Grand Prix	Best Actress	Takako Tokiwa	Won	
2000	3rd Nikkan Sports Drama Grand Prix	Best Supporting Actress	Miki Mizuno	Won	
2001	10th TV Life Annual Drama Awards	Best Drama	Beautiful Life	Won	
2001	10th TV Life Annual Drama Awards	Best Actor	Takuya Kimura	Won	
2001	10th TV Life Annual Drama Awards	Best Actress	Takako Tokiwa	Won	
2001	10th TV Life Annual Drama Awards	Best Supporting Actor	Atsuro Watabe	Won	
2001	10th TV Life Annual Drama Awards	Best Supporting Actress	Miki Mizuno	Won	
2001	10th TV Life Annual Drama Awards	Best Screenplay	Eriko Kitagawa	Won	
