= Long Vacation =

1996 Japanese television series

- Long Vacation DVD/Blu-Ray cover
- Kanji: ロングバケーション
- Genre: Drama, romance
- Written by: Eriko Kitagawa
- Directed by: Kōzō Nagayama; Masayuki Suzuki; Hirotsugu Usui
- Starring: Takuya Kimura; Tomoko Yamaguchi
- Music by: Cagnet
- Opening theme: La La La Love Song by Toshinobu Kubota
- Country of origin: Japan
- Original language: Japanese
- No. of series: 1
- No. of episodes: 11

Original release
- Network: FNS (Fuji TV)
- Release: 15 April – 24 June 1996

Long Vacation (ロングバケーション, also known as ロンバケ) is a Japanese television drama series from Fuji Television, first shown in Japan from 15 April to 24 June 1996.

The show's high ratings in Japan made Takuya Kimura popular in the Asia-Pacific region and known as "The King of Ratings". It also made Tomoko Yamaguchi a known actress in Japan.

The characters in the series have something in common: if not jobless, they can do no better than secure a temporary job. This is a portrayal of a time when Japan was plagued by deep recession, when its people suffered profound depression from constant failure to earn a stable income. The series also portrays how relationships are made and broken, and explores how people come to depend on each other for solace.

== Plot ==
Minami and Sena meet when Sena's apartment-mate, Asakura, jilts Minami on their wedding day. Minami learns from Sena that Asakura has left, whereabouts unknown. Sena allows Minami to move into the apartment, since she is penniless, having given all her money to Asakura, and cannot pay the rent on her apartment.

This is the beginning of a romance between Sena and Minami. Minami and Sena confide in and console each other about their relationship problems and their lack of success in life. Sena has a crush on his junior, Ryoko. However, Ryoko does not feel the same, instead, she falls for Minami's little brother Shinji.

Minami meets a professional photographer, Sugisaki, who proposes marriage. Although Sugisaki fits Minami's ideal, she feels unsure about her feeling. Meanwhile, Sena has a chance of winning a piano competition and going to Boston, joining the symphony orchestra. After he wins the contest, he proposes Minami to marry and go with him to Boston.

== Cast ==
- Takuya Kimura as Sena Hidetoshi (瀬名秀俊)
- Tomoko Yamaguchi as Hayama Minami (葉山南)
- Yutaka Takenouchi as Hayama Shinji (葉山真二)
- Takako Matsu as Okusawa Ryoko (奥沢涼子)
- Izumi Inamori as Koishikawa Momoko (小石川桃子)
- Ryō as Himuro Rumiko (氷室ルミ子)
- Leo Morimoto as Professor Sasaki (佐々木教授)
- Ryōko Hirosue as Saito Takako (斉藤貴子)
- Kosuke Toyohara as Sugisaki Tetsuya (杉崎哲也)

== Episodes ==
| Episode | Date | Rating (%) |
|---|---|---|
| 01 | 15 April 1996 | 30.6 |
| 02 | 22 April 1996 | 28.3 |
| 03 | 29 April 1996 | 29.0 |
| 04 | 6 May 1996 | 27.6 |
| 05 | 13 May 1996 | 27.9 |
| 06 | 20 May 1996 | 25.5 |
| 07 | 27 May 1996 | 27.7 |
| 08 | 3 June 1996 | 29.9 |
| 09 | 10 June 1996 | 29.1 |
| 10 | 17 June 1996 | 28.6 |
| 11 | 24 June 1996 | 36.7 |

== Production ==
The theme song was La La La Love Song by Toshinobu Kubota and features Naomi Campbell.

== Media ==
Long Vacation was released on DVD in Japan on 21 November 2001. At the time it was released, it had a limited edition booklet released alongside the first 5,000 DVD copies.

=== Novel ===
A novelization of Long Vacation was written by Eriko Kitagawa.

=== Broadcast ===
It was formerly broadcast in Hong Kong. In the US, it was formerly aired via KTSF TV with English subtitles.

On 22 July 2020, Viu announced that they have acquired the streaming rights to broadcast Long Vacation to Southeast Asia with regional subtitles alongside Love Generation, A Sleeping Forest, The Ordinary People, Hundred Million Stars From The Sky and the Hero series.

== Reception ==
When the series debuted in Japan, it was so popular with the female audience that the expression The Office Lady disappears on Monday from the city (月曜日はOLが街から消える, Getsuyōbi wa OL ga machi kara kieru) was used to highlight its fanbase. This was because the series was broadcast on Monday evenings. The episodes had an average rating of 29.5% of viewers, with the final episode reaching 36.7%. According to a research study conducted by NHK in 2009, the bulk of viewers were those who were teenagers (13 or older), at 40% of viewers, the second group were from those in their twenties at 34%.

The series was popular with viewers in Hong Kong thanks to pirated VCD copies sold there before the show was legally broadcast.

On 11 November 2019, Fuji TV announced that photos and props from the show were on display at Fuji TV's Headquarters in Odaiba to highlight the most popular dramas viewed through the Heisei Era in an exhibit until January 2020.

According to Television, Japan and Globalization, the themes of finding happiness are embodied through Minami when she mentions of her right to seek happiness by herself instead of getting married. This view is centered on people's lives when they look for existential meaning.

== Accolades ==
| Award | Category | Recipient(s) | Result | Ref. |
|---|---|---|---|---|
| 6th TV Life Annual Drama Awards | Best Series | Long Vacation | Won | |
| 6th TV Life Annual Drama Awards | Best Actor | Takuya Kimura | Won | |
| 6th TV Life Annual Drama Awards | Best Actress | Tomoko Yamaguchi | Won | |
| 6th TV Life Annual Drama Awards | Best Supporting Actress | Izumi Inamori | Won | |
| 6th TV Life Annual Drama Awards | Best Newcomer | Takako Matsu | Won | |
| 6th TV Life Annual Drama Awards | Best Theme Song | La La La Love Song | Won | |

== Remake ==
In 2026, Fuji Television announced the first-ever remake of Long Vacation by Makerville from Hong Kong, starring Edan Lui (Sena), Ali Lee (Minami). It will be aired in Dec 2026.

== Bibliography ==
- Clements, Jonathan; Tamamuro, Motoko (2003). The Dorama Encyclopedia: A Guide to Japanese TV Drama Since 1953. Stone Bridge Press. ISBN 978-1880656815.
- Yoshihiro, Mitsuhiro; Tsai, Eva; Choi, JungBong (2010). Television, Japan, and Globalization. University of Michigan Center For Japanese Studies. ISBN 978-1929280599.
