= Library Wars =

2013 Japanese film by Shinsuke Sato

- Theatrical release poster
- Kanji: 図書館戦争
- Revised Hepburn: Toshokan Sensō
- Directed by: Shinsuke Sato
- Screenplay by: Akiko Nogi
- Based on: Library War by Hiro Arikawa
- Produced by: Tamako Tsujimoto
- Starring: Junichi Okada; Nana Eikura; Kei Tanaka; Sota Fukushi; Naomi Nishida; Jun Hashimoto; Kazuma Suzuki; Kazuyuki Aijima; Kyusaku Shimada; Kiyoshi Kodama; Chiaki Kuriyama; Kōji Ishizaka
- Cinematography: Tarō Kawazu
- Edited by: Tsuyoshi Imai
- Music by: Yū Takami
- Production company: Sedic International
- Distributed by: Toho
- Release dates: March 18, 2013 (Hong Kong); April 27, 2013 (Japan)
- Running time: 128 minutes
- Country: Japan
- Language: Japanese
- Box office: ¥1.72 billion (Japan); $16.8 million (worldwide)

Library Wars (Japanese: 図書館戦争, Hepburn: Toshokan Sensō) is a 2013 Japanese film based on the light novel series Library War by Hiro Arikawa. Produced by Sedic International and distributed by Toho, the film was directed by Shinsuke Sato from a script written by Akiko Nogi. It stars Junichi Okada as Atsushi Dojo and Nana Eikura as Iku Kasahara, alongside Kei Tanaka, Sota Fukushi, Naomi Nishida, Jun Hashimoto, Kazuma Suzuki, Kazuyuki Aijima, Kyusaku Shimada, Kiyoshi Kodama, Chiaki Kuriyama, and Kōji Ishizaka. In the film, Kasahara joins the Library Defense Force, an organization tasked to protect libraries against the Media Betterment Committee from censorship, where she meets Dojo as her instructor.

A live-action film adaptation to be directed by Sato was announced in August 2012, along with the casting of Okada and Eikura. Filming began in September 2012 and concluded in December of that year, taking place at Saitama, Ibaraki, Yamanashi, and Fukuoka prefectures. Additional cast were revealed in November 2012. The film was completed in February 2013.

Library Wars premiered in Hong Kong on March 18, 2013, and was released in Japan on April 27. The film grossed ¥1.72 billion in Japan. A sequel, Library Wars: The Last Mission, premiered in 2015.

== Plot ==
In 1988, the Media Betterment Act becomes a law which limits freedom of speech, particularly in media publications, because Japan sees it as a bad influence on their people. The Media Betterment Committee gets armed to enforce the law. In 2004, the Library Defense Force is established by Iwao Nishina, a survivor of the Hino Library incident in 1999, as its commander to combat the censorship.

In a bookstore, high school student Iku Kasahara witnesses the Media Betterment Committee confiscating the books, including her favorite fairy tale book. When she resists to give up her book, Kasahara is saved by a mysterious member of the Library Defense Force who orders the Media Betterment agents that the books are now under their protection. This incident inspires Kasahara to join the Library Defense Force in 2019 to find her so-called "prince", where she is placed under the supervision of instructor Atsushi Dojo, whom she has trouble getting along. Later, she and Hikaru Tezuka are transferred to the elite unit Library Task Force led by its squad leader Ryusuke Genda. As they return to base following their training camp, the task force passes by a bookstore, where Kasahara witnesses another censorship operation. She immediately intervenes in the operation and declares the books to be under the Library Defense Force's protection, but her rank is low to collect the books. Kasahara is saved by Dojo but later gets reprimanded for her reckless actions.

Later, the Media Betterment Committee demands the Library Defense Force to surrender the graphic novels being kept in their headquarters, the Musashino Library, as part of an ongoing murder investigation in which those novels are found in the murderer's possession and might have inspired him to commit the crime. The Library Defense Force refuses, causing the Media Betterment Committee to use force to access the library. While fighting is taking place outside, library staffer and Kasahara's friend Asako Shibasaki finds two Media Betterment agents entering the premise. Kasahara and Tezuka engage with the intruders and manage to retrieve the confiscated books. The assault, which only lasts for an hour as per the agreement, ends. Afterward, Tezuka wants Kasahara to be his girlfriend, but she is not giving him an answer for now.

Sometime later, industrialist Sohachi Nobeyama, who owns a museum in Odawara where the documents regarding illegalities on the passing of the Act can be found, passes away. As per Nobeyama's last will, all of the materials in the museum will be transferred to Musashino Library. The Library Defense Force prepares to defend the museum from the Media Betterment Committee's assault. Genda dismisses Kasahara from the task force and assigns her to guard Nishina during his visit to the funeral. Later, Kasahara and Nishina get kidnapped by supporters of the law, who demand the Library Defense Force to burn the museum materials. Kasahara is allowed to talk to confirm their safety and gives the Library Defense Force a hint that they are somewhere in Tachikawa. Dojo and Mikihisa Komaki manage to rescue Kasahara and Nishina. The hostage taking and the assault at the museum gets published on newspapers by journalist and Nishina's friend Maki Orikuchi. Meanwhile, Kasahara rejects Tezuka and later realizes that her prince is Dojo.

== Cast ==
- Junichi Okada as Atsushi Dojo
- Nana Eikura as Iku Kasahara
- Kei Tanaka as Mikihisa Komaki
- Sota Fukushi as Hikaru Tezuka
- Naomi Nishida as Maki Orikuchi
- Jun Hashimoto as Ryusuke Genda
- Kazuma Suzuki as Kenji Takeyama
- Kazuyuki Aijima as Captain Hajime Biitani
- Kyusaku Shimada as Detective Hiraga
- Kiyoshi Kodama as Kazuichi Inamine
- Chiaki Kuriyama as Asako Shibasaki
- Kōji Ishizaka as Iwao Nishina

== Production ==
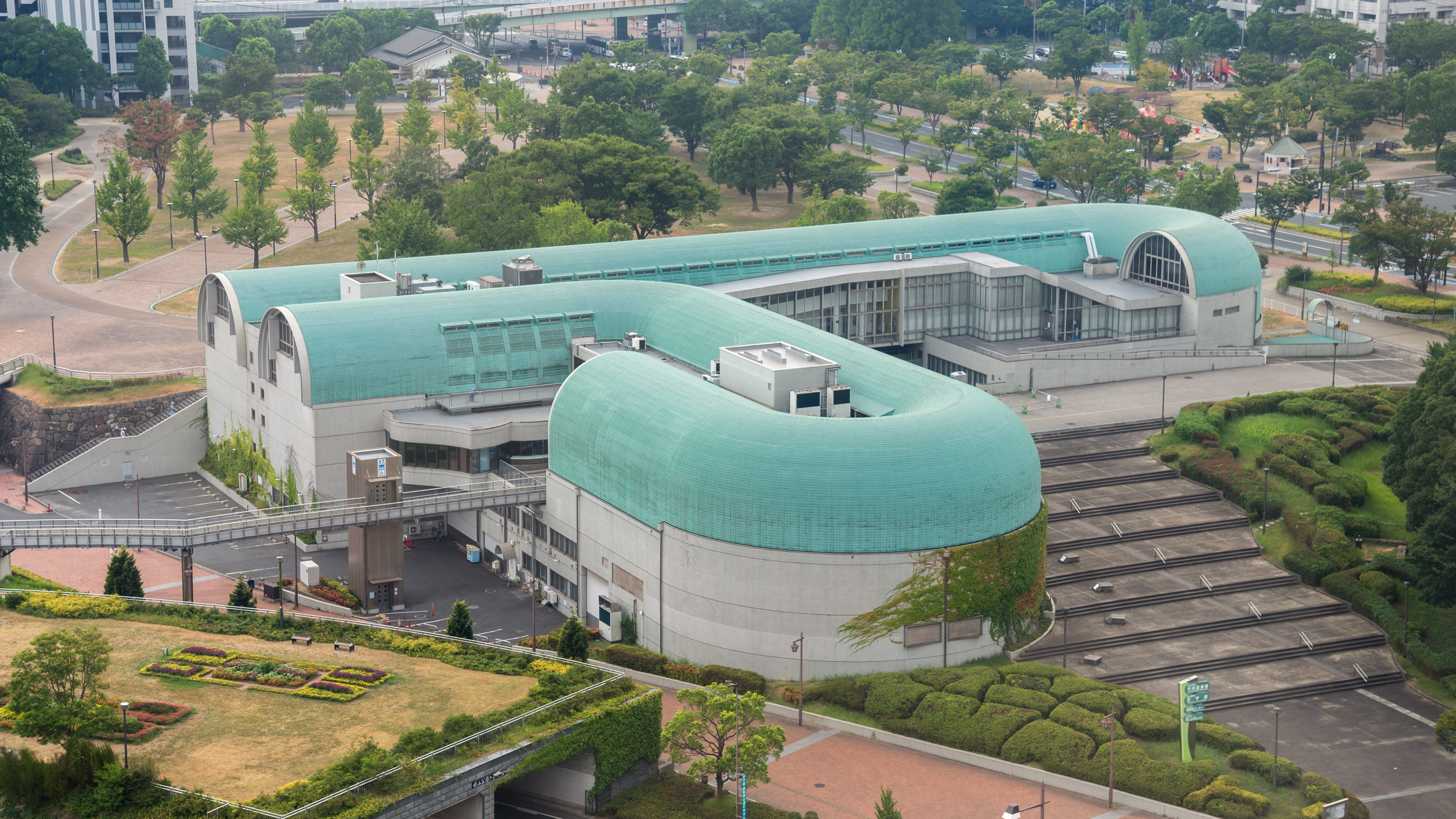
The Kitakyushu City Central Library in Kitakyushu, Fukuoka was used to depict the outside view of Musashino Library, the Library Defense Force headquarters.

A live-action film adaptation of the light novel series Library War by Hiro Arikawa was announced in August 2012, with Shinsuke Sato serving as the director. That month, Junichi Okada and Nana Eikura were cast as Atsushi Dojo and Iku Kasahara, respectively. Principal photography began on September 29, 2012, with filming locations set on Iruma Air Base and Kumagaya Air Base in Saitama Prefecture, and libraries in Mito, Ibaraki, Kōfu, Yamanashi, and Kitakyushu, Fukuoka. The Japan Ground Self-Defense Force and Japan Air Self-Defense Force provided assistance. The gunfight scene that was filmed in a shopping center at Jōsō, Ibaraki had more than 5,000 gunshots fired, in addition to 40,000 magazines and books scattered all over the floor. In November 2012, Chiaki Kuriyama, Kōji Ishizaka, Kei Tanaka, Jun Hashimoto, Naomi Nishida, and Sota Fukushi joined the cast. Ishizaka played an original character named Iwao Nishina. The film wrapped on December 5, 2012. In February 2013, Jōji Abe, a Japanese actor and member of the theater troupes Caramel Box and Sky Rocket, was confirmed to be making an appearance. The film was completed later that month after its dubbing was concluded.

== Music ==
Yū Takami composed the theme song for Library Wars, titled "Library Wars", and the film's original soundtrack. The song was released on March 20, 2013, and the soundtrack on April 24.

== Marketing ==
The teaser trailer for Library Wars was released in December 2012. A collaboration between the film and the manga series Sgt. Frog was revealed in March 2013, in which the titular character, Sergeant Keroro, joined the Library Defense Force with the rank of Library Clerk First Class, the same rank as with Kasahara, despite the sergeant rank in his name. The film also collaborated with the Japanese tonkatsu chain store Kimukatsu.

== Release ==
=== Theatrical ===
Library Wars had its world premiere at the Hong Kong International Film & Television Market in Hong Kong on March 18, 2013. The film was released in Japan on April 27, 2013. It was screened at the Puchon International Fantastic Film Festival in Bucheon, South Korea in late July 2013, at the Fantasia International Film Festival in Montreal, Quebec on July 30, at the Japan Film Festival of San Francisco in San Francisco, California on August 2–3, and at LA EigaFest in Los Angeles, California on December 8.

=== Home media ===
Library Wars was released on Blu-ray and DVD in Japan on November 13, 2013. The film was added on Netflix in Japan on February 23, 2023.

== Reception ==
=== Box office ===
Library Wars grossed ¥1.72 billion in Japan, becoming the twenty-second highest-grossing Japanese film in 2013. The film had a worldwide box office gross of $16.8 million. It grossed ¥217 million in its opening weekend and debuted at fourth place in box office rankings. It earned an additional ¥226 million in the second weekend and surpassed the one-billion-yen box-office milestone in the third weekend after earning ¥97.4 million.

=== Critical response ===
Mark Adams of Screen Daily stated that Library Wars was a "sci-fi film that makes the most of the most incongruous of action concepts." Adams lauded Sato for his direction, particularly his handling of action sequences while layering humor and romance into the storyline. He also felt that Kuriyama's casting would help boost the film's international profile due to her role in Kill Bill: Volume 1 (2003). Andrew Mack of Screen Anarchy felt the film was "thoroughly entertaining and funny" and praised its action sequences and romance plot. Clarence Tsui of The Hollywood Reporter felt the film was "more like an inflated tele-serial skipping from one thread to another, sometimes with its dystopian settings largely forgotten as the main protagonists' light-as-air emotional struggles taking over." Tsui noted that the raison d'être for Japan's tolerance on Library Defense Force despite being an authoritarian state was never made clear. Despite that, she found that the conflict between the authorities and armed librarians was used as "devices through which Kasahara builds her character and she and Dojo establishes a rapport-turns-romance."

== Library "Mini" Wars ==
Sato directed a short silent film, titled Library "Mini" Wars (図書館mini戦争, Toshokan "Mini" Sensō), under his video production label Angle Pictures. It follows the daily lives of two library staffers away from the main storyline of Library Wars. Terata Karan and Ako Masuki reprised their respective roles from the film as Yui and Ako, with Keisuke Tomita and Kensei Mikami co-starring as library users. Two episodes were streamed on a website created by Angle Pictures, as well as on the label's YouTube channel. Library "Mini" Wars was also aired on the Wowow channel from April 1 to May 5, 2013.

== Sequel ==
=== Library Wars: The Last Mission ===
A sequel to Library Wars, titled Library Wars: The Last Mission, was announced in December 2014, with Sato returning to direct it. Additionally, Okada and Eikura were set to reprise their roles, alongside the returning cast members Tanaka, Fukushi, Kuriyama, Ishizaka, Nishida, and Hashimoto. The sequel would take place one and half years after the events of the film. The Last Mission was released in Japan on October 10, 2015.
