= Library War =

Japanese light novel series

- Library War, the first light novel in the series.

図書館戦争 (Toshokan Sensō)
- Genre: Drama; Romance; Science fiction
- Light novel
- Written by: Hiro Arikawa
- Illustrated by: Sukumo Adabana
- Published by: MediaWorks
- Original run: February 10, 2006 – November 10, 2007
- Volumes: 4
- Manga

Library Wars: Love & War
- Written by: Hiro Arikawa
- Illustrated by: Kiiro Yumi
- Published by: Hakusensha
- English publisher: NA: Viz Media
- Magazine: LaLa
- Original run: September 24, 2007 – December 24, 2014
- Volumes: 15
- Manga

Toshokan Sensō Spitfire!
- Written by: Hiro Arikawa
- Illustrated by: Yayoi Furudori
- Published by: ASCII Media Works
- Magazine: Dengeki Daioh
- Original run: January 2008 – June 2008
- Volumes: 1
- Light novel

Bessatsu Toshokan Sensō
- Written by: Hiro Arikawa
- Illustrated by: Sukumo Adabana
- Published by: ASCII Media Works
- Original run: April 10, 2008 – August 9, 2008
- Volumes: 2
- Anime television series
- Directed by: Takayuki Hamana
- Written by: Takeshi Konuta
- Music by: Yugo Kanno
- Studio: Production I.G
- Licensed by: NA: Discotek Media
- Original network: Fuji TV (Noitamina)
- Original run: April 10, 2008 – June 26, 2008
- Episodes: 12
- Original video animation
- Directed by: Takayuki Hamana
- Music by: Yugo Kanno
- Studio: Production I.G
- Released: October 1, 2008
- Runtime: 24 minutes
- Other
- Library War: The Wings of Revolution (2012); Library Wars (2013); Library Wars: The Last Mission (2015)
- icon

Library War (図書館戦争, Toshokan Sensō) is a Japanese light novel series by Hiro Arikawa, with illustrations by Sukumo Adabana. There are four novels in the series, though only the first novel is called Toshokan Sensō; the subsequent novels are named Toshokan Nairan, Toshokan Kiki, and Toshokan Kakumei. The novels were published by MediaWorks between February 2006 and November 2007. Two volumes of a spin-off series entitled Bessatsu Toshokan Sensō (別冊 図書館戦争; lit. Supplement: Library War) have also been published by ASCII Media Works.

Two manga adaptations were published by Hakusensha and ASCII Media Works. A 12-episode anime adaptation produced by Production I.G aired on Fuji TV's Noitamina programming block between April and June 2008. Two Internet radio shows started in April 2008 meant to promote the series which are hosted by voice actors of the anime. An anime film by Production I.G was released on June 16, 2012. A live action film was released on April 27, 2013, with its sequel released on October 10, 2015.

By April 2008, the original four novels and volume one of the spin-off series have sold over 1.25 million copies in Japan. In 2008, Library War received the 39th Seiun Award for Best Japanese Long Work.

== Plot ==
The background of the plot is based on the Statement on Intellectual Freedom in Libraries that went into effect in Japan in 1954 (amended in 1979), and the terms are a little different from the Freedom of the Library Law that appears in Toshokan Sensō.

The simplified declaration:

It is the most important responsibility of libraries to offer collected materials and library facilities to the people who have the Right to Know as one of their fundamental human rights. In order to fulfill their mission, libraries shall recognize the following matters as their proper duties, and shall put them into practice.

1. Libraries have freedom in collecting their materials.
2. Libraries secure the freedom of offering their materials.
3. Libraries guarantee the privacy of users.
4. Libraries oppose any type of censorship categorically.

When the freedom of libraries is imperiled, we librarians will work together and devote ourselves to secure the freedom.

In Library War, the fourth chapter of the Freedom of Library Law states:

30. Libraries have freedom in collecting their materials.
31. Libraries secure the freedom of offering their materials.
32. Libraries guarantee the privacy of users.
33. Libraries oppose any type of improper censorship categorically.
34. When the freedom of libraries is imperiled, we librarians will work together and devote ourselves to secure the freedom.

The details will be amended anytime according to the Media Betterment Act and its enforcement.

=== Story ===
The premise involves the Japanese government passing the Media Betterment Act (MBA) (Note: Other translations call it the Media Improvement Act, Media Enforcement Act or the Media Cleansing Act.) (メディア良化法, Media ryōkahō) as law in 1989 which allows the censorship of any media deemed to be potentially harmful to Japanese society by deploying agents in the Media Betterment Committee (メディア良化委員会, Media ryōka iinkai) (MBC) with the mandate to go after individuals and organizations that are trying to exercise the act of conducting freedom of expression activities in the media.^{Ep 01} However, local governments opposed to the MBA establish armed anti-MBA defense force units to protect libraries from being raided by MBC agents under the Freedom of the Libraries Law. The conflict between MBC agents and library soldiers has continued to 2019, when the story begins. In accordance with the Japanese era calendar scheme, 1989 in Library War is rendered the first year of the fictional Seika (正化) era, rendering 2019 as Seika 31.

Library War follows the life of Iku Kasahara, a new recruit in the Kantō Library Base who joined in 2019 after being inspired by a high ranking Kantō Library Defense Force member who saved a book she wanted to buy that was targeted for censorship.^{Ep 01} After joining, however, she finds the pace to be very demanding, and that her drill instructor Atsushi Dojo seems to have it in for her and working her harder than the other recruits. On multiple occasions, Kasahara shows herself to be reckless, particularly when she puts Dojo in danger by not securing a criminal in the base's library, and later getting involved with Media Betterment Committee agents despite not being a high enough ranked official; in both instances Dojo has to help her out of trouble. Despite these imperfections, Kasahara is enlisted into the base's Library Task Force, an elite group of soldiers who go through rigorous training in order to respond during difficult operations. This is partially due to Dojo realizing that he did not give Kasahara adequate training, so he gives his recommendation that she join the task force,^{Ep 02} of which he is a member, in order to correct this mistake on his part. Other recommendations come from the captain of the task force, Ryusuke Genda, and second class task force library officer Mikihisa Komaki who is the same rank as Dojo. Along with Kasahara, another new recruit named Hikaru Tezuka is also enlisted into the task force who is much more capable at the position than Kasahara. Kasahara continues to try her best in the face of difficult challenges while protecting the books she has sworn to protect. As the story progresses, a romance blooms and Iku and Dojo make romantic feelings for each other evident.

=== Library Team ===
The Library Team Defense Force (図書隊防衛部, Toshotai Bōeibu), or Library Defense Force (図書隊, Toshotai) (LDF), in Library War is a paramilitary organization in Japan which serves to defend libraries against the Media Betterment Act (MBA) enforced by the Media Betterment Committee (MBC) via Media Betterment Corps and other pro-MBA independent factions. Different from the normal librarian department (業務部, gyōmubu), which performs librarian functions like modern librarians, the LDF's main goal is to provide self-defense from the MBC during library raids, though their jurisdiction only extends so far as in the confines of library facilities in connection with the LDF, meaning they cannot extend their effort even into the city where an LDF base is located.^{Ep 02}^{Ep 04} However, there are provisions around this, such as in accordance with Library Law Article 30 regarding book collection in that LDF Library Officers or above can choose to buy any book they want, even books targeted for censorship by the MBC. The LDF has ten bases throughout Japan in ten regions of Japan: Hokkaidō, Tōhoku, Hokuriku, Chūbu, Kantō, Kansai, Chūgoku, Shikoku, Kyūshū, and Okinawa.^{Ep 02} Each of the bases act under the provisions of the local government, and houses a public library where civilians can read and check out books.

In the early years of the conflict the library forces were not well organized, so coordination with neighboring forces was often delayed which caused problems in times of armed conflict. One such incident in Library War occurred on February 7, 1999, in Hino at the Hino Library which later became known as the Hino Nightmare (日野の悪夢, Hino no Akumu).^{Ep 02} The incident was caused by an independent group which sided with the Media Betterment Committee raiding the Hino Library and caused the deaths of twelve people who were against the Media Betterment Act.^{Ep 03} Since that day, the library forces armed themselves in self-defense and have become much more organized; the public even acknowledges the LDF as having more combat experience than the police or the Japan Self-Defense Forces. The incident also caused the formation of library bases in ten regions, and the system of library forces in operation at the beginning of Library War.

The Library Defense Force has several branches which contribute to the organization as a whole. At the top is the Administrative Department where library administrators work doing daily administrative duties such as planning, organizing, staffing, budgeting, or directing. The Department of Defense works on defending against the Media Betterment Committee, and one section of the department consists of the Library Task Force, an elite group of soldiers who go through rigorous training in order to respond during difficult operations. At the Kantō Library Base, there are about fifty members in the task force. The Logistical Support Department works on stocking books and supplying the Department of Defense with military equipment, though it does not get involved with general outsourcing. There is also a Human Resources Department in charge of human resources, and an intelligence agency. There are approximately 30,000 members in the Library Defense Force throughout Japan. The German Chamomile is used in the insignia of Library Officers and above because the flower was a favorite of the late wife of the Library Defense Force commander Kazuichi Inamine.

== Characters ==
Library War main characters (from left to right): Komaki, Shibasaki, Kasahara, Genda, Dojo, and Tezuka.

Iku Kasahara (笠原 郁, Kasahara Iku)
Voiced by: Marina Inoue
Portrayed by: Nana Eikura
A twenty-two-year-old member ranked in Library Clerk First Class. She is later promoted to Library Clerk Supervisor. She joined the Library Defense Force's Kantō Library Base in 2019 after being inspired by a high ranking Kantō Library Defense Force member who saved a book she wanted to buy that was targeted for censorship. She holds this unknown person in high regard, thinking of him as her "prince", and she wants to be an "ally of justice" as he was for her. As such, she has a strong sense of justice when it comes to freedom of expression and is willing to put her life on the line for the books she has sworn to protect. However, when she enters into recruit training, she finds it to be very challenging, especially since her drill instructor Atsushi Dojo, who seems to have singled her out for more attention and pushes her harder than most other recruits. In high school, she had been a member of the track and field team, so she has a lot of stamina and drive to continue with the Library Defense Force.
When the story begins, Kasahara is a sub-par recruit who constantly prone to making critical mistakes and is not as knowledgeable about the cause she is in the middle of compared to others around her, mostly due to her not paying attention in lectures on the base. Despite these apparent flaws, she is recruited into the base's Library Task Force, an elite group of soldiers who go through rigorous training in order to respond during difficult operations. While at first she starts out slow, she soon becomes capable of clerical tasks in regard to working in the base's library, though she still finds it difficult to make a positive impression on Dojo, her superior officer. Later on, Kasahara finds out that Dojo, her superior, is actually her "prince" and she begins to warm up to him somewhat. By the end of the series, she marries Dojo and takes on his surname.
Atsushi Dojo (堂上 篤, Dōjō Atsushi)
Voiced by: Tomoaki Maeno
Portrayed by: Junichi Okada
A twenty-six-year-old member of the Library Task Force and is ranked Librarian Second Class. He is 165 cm (5 ft 5 in) tall, though is thought to be too short for Kasahara, despite her only being 5 cm (2.0 in) taller. He is very tough on Kasahara due to her not inspiring enough trust in him, and the fact that he believes he did not give her adequate recruit training. Part of the reason why he pushes Kasahara so much is that he sees his old self in her, and he is angry that she is bringing that back to him with such emotional force, despite him trying to forget about it. He later realises that he hurt her just so he could protect his fragile self. He often worries about Kasahara and even defends her from comments from others. By the end of the series, he marries Iku.
Asako Shibasaki (柴崎 麻子, Shibasaki Asako)
Voiced by: Miyuki Sawashiro
Portrayed by: Chiaki Kuriyama
A member of the Library Task Force and is initially ranked Library Clerk First Class. She is later promoted to Library Clerk Supervisor. She works as an intelligence specialist, and is very good at gathering information. She is Kasahara's roommate, and after Kasahara joins the task force, Shibasaki helps her study the catalogs in the base's library through a form of negative reinforcement involving giving her candy when she gave the wrong answers which leads her to break out in pimples. Shibasaki often tells Kasahara things she finds out in regards to Kasahara and her direct superiors such as Dojo or Genda. She tries to give Kasahara advice and cheer her up when she is sulking due to events most often brought on by Dojo, though in the beginning of the series, she has slight feelings for him. Later on, she falls in love with Hikaru
Mikihisa Komaki (小牧 幹久, Komaki Mikihisa)
Voiced by: Akira Ishida
Portrayed by: Kei Tanaka
A twenty-seven-year-old member of the Library Task Force like Dojo. He is ranked Librarian Second Class. He is typically seen smiling or laughing at his coworkers, especially concerning the conversations between Kasahara and Dojo. He is also one of the instructors in the Task Force. He often gives advice to Dojo or Kasahara in regards to the relationship between them, whether it be on a personal or professional level. He is partly responsible to Kasahara being drafted into the Task Force.
Hikaru Tezuka (手塚 光, Tezuka Hikaru)
Voiced by: Tatsuhisa Suzuki
Portrayed by: Sota Fukushi
A member of the Library Task Force. He is initially ranked Library Clerk First Class, but is later promoted to Library Clerk Supervisor. He is drafted into the Library Task Force at the same time as Kasahara, though shows himself to be much more capable in terms of knowledge gained in lectures, clerical work in the base's library, and in typical combat. He finds it hard to give credit to Kasahara in the beginning since she is not up to what he considers to be the standards of a Library Task Force member, though he later recognizes her improvement. Due to a comment by Dojo that he could learn some things from her, Tezuka asked Kasahara if she would date him, though she later turns him down. He later on develops feelings for Asako. He has an older brother named Satoshi Tezuka, who is a part of the government's Future of the Library Committee.
Ryusuke Genda (玄田 竜助, Genda Ryūsuke)
Voiced by: Kanji Suzumori
Portrayed by: Jun Hashimoto
A forty-three-year-old captain of the Library Task Force. He is ranked Supervising Librarian Third Class. It is partly due to him that Kasahara is drafted into the Task Force, since he is the captain and had the final say. He is very strong, and Kasahara even thinks he has enough brawn to take on a bear. He is a veteran field commander and possesses great politic acumen; on one operation he ensured the Media Betterment Act forces secured books and magazines the Library Defense Force already had copies of so that they do not leave empty handed and in disgrace. He is willing to take great risks to achieve objectives, such as buying a building for declared use as a future library only so that the Task Force could raid the premises in order to rescue Kasahara and Inamine when they are taken hostage.
Kazuichi Inamine (稲嶺 和市, Inamine Kazuichi)
Voiced by: Haruo Satō
The commander of the Library Defense Forces who is in direct charge of the Kantō Library Base, and has been involved with the conflict between the Media Betterment Committee and the Library Defense Force since the beginning. Twenty years before the events of the story, a major conflict between the two factions, called "The Hino Nightmare," occurred at the library in Hino, Tokyo where a group siding with the Media Betterment Act raided the library. Inamine was caught in the middle of the conflict and lost his wife and his right leg because of it.

== Media ==
=== Light novels ===
Library War began as a series of light novels written by Hiro Arikawa, and drawn by Sukumo Adabana. There are four novels in the series, though only the first novel is called Toshokan Sensō; the subsequent novels are named Toshokan Nairan (図書館内乱; lit. Library Infighting), Toshokan Kiki (図書館危機; lit. Library Crisis), and Toshokan Kakumei (図書館革命; lit. Library Revolution). The novels were published by MediaWorks between February 2006 and November 2007. The first volume of a spin-off series entitled Bessatsu Toshokan Sensō (別冊 図書館戦争; lit. Supplement: Library War) was published on April 10, 2008, by ASCII Media Works, and the second followed on August 9, 2008.

The novels were translated to French by Glenat.

=== Manga ===
A manga adaptation, titled Library Wars: Love & War (図書館戦争 LOVE&WAR, Toshokan Sensō Love & War), is drawn by Kiiro Yumi and was serialized in Hakusensha's shōjo manga magazine LaLa between September 24, 2007, and December 24, 2014. Hakusensha published 15 tankōbon volumes between April 5, 2008 and June 5, 2015. Viz Media licensed Library Wars: Love & War, and the first volume was released in North America in June 2010. As of April 5, 2016, there are 15 volumes released in North America.

Another manga adaptation, titled Toshokan Sensō Spitfire! (図書館戦争 SPITFIRE!), is drawn by Yayoi Furudori and was serialized in ASCII Media Works' shōnen manga magazine Dengeki Daioh between the January 2008 and June 2008 issues. One volume of Toshokan Sensō Spitfire! was released on June 27, 2008.

=== Internet radio shows ===
Two Internet radio shows produced by Animate first aired on April 10, 2008, under the same main title Kantō Book Base: Public Relations Department (関東図書基地 広報課, Kantō Tosho Kichi Kōhōka), but with differing subtitles. The first show, with the subtitle Men's Dormitory (男子寮, Danshi Ryō) is hosted by Tomoaki Maeno and Tatsuhisa Suzuki who play Atsushi Dōjō and Hikaru Tezuka in the anime adaptation, respectively; the second show, with the subtitle Women's Dormitory (女子寮, Joshi Ryō), is hosted by Marina Inoue and Miyuki Sawashiro who play Iku Kasahara and Asako Shibasaki in the anime, respectively. The first volume compilation CD containing some of the broadcasts was released on August 6, 2008, with the second compilation on December 26, 2008.

=== Anime ===
It was announced by Production I.G via MediaWorks advertising that they would animate Library War. The anime is directed by Takayuki Hamana and written by Takeshi Konuta. It aired 12 episodes in Japan between April 10 and June 26, 2008, on Fuji TV's Noitamina programming block. A commercial and promo were both created to promote the series after the series was announced. Five DVD compilation volumes were released between August 6 and December 3, 2008; the first two contain the two episodes each, while the latter three contain three episodes each. The third volume contains, in addition to episodes six and seven, an original video animation episode.

The anime's opening theme is "Atashi no Machi, Ashita no Machi" (あたしの街、明日の街), performed and written by Hitomi Takahashi, with Satoru Hirade on composition and arrangement and produced under Sony Music Records. The opening theme single was released on June 4, 2008. The ending theme is "Changes" performed and arranged by Base Ball Bear of EMI Music Japan with lyrics and composition by Yūsuke Koide. The ending theme single was released on May 8, 2008. The anime's original soundtrack was released on June 25, 2008.

=== Films ===
An anime film with the same staff as the TV series, titled Library War: The Wings of Revolution (図書館戦争 革命のつばさ, Toshokan Sensō Kakumei no Tsubasa) was released in Japanese theaters on June 16, 2012. A live action film titled Library Wars was released on April 27, 2013. Its sequel, Library Wars: The Last Mission, was released on October 10, 2015.

== Reception ==
In the fourth Japan Science Fiction convention, Library War won the 39th Seiun Award for Best Japanese Long Work in 2008. By April 2008, the original four novels and volume one of the spin-off series have sold over 1.25 million copies in Japan. The story was inspired from the Statement on Intellectual Freedom in Libraries of the Japan Library Association.

In the initial Anime DVD charts, Library War ranked first on the top ten before it went down to eighth place. The series had sold in 2008 a total of 7,949 copies. In 2008, Bessatsu Toshokan Sensō I had sold 62,737 copies and was ranked seventh best light novel while Bessatsu Toshokan Sensō II was ranked the fifth best light novel with a total of 67,874 copies sold. After its debut broadcast, Library War had an average household rating of 4.5. The series also has a strong fan backing, as noted by Deb Aoki, manga guide of About.com, who says that when Viz Media announced their license for the Love and War manga version, "a cry of delight rose up from fans of this manga, anime and light novel series."

== See also ==
- Book burning
- Book censorship
- Fahrenheit 451
