= Natsuko (actress) =

Japanese actress, singer and columnist (born 1989)

- 奈津子
- Born: Natsuko Oki; 18 August 1989 (age 36); Chiba Prefecture, Japan
- Other names: Natsuaki (ナツアキ)
- Occupation: Actress
- Years active: 2005–present
- Agent: ABP inc.
- Television: Gal Circle; Tomehane! Suzuri Kōkō Shodōbu
- Height: 160 cm (5 ft 3 in)
- Children: 1
- Relatives: Akiko (sister)

Natsuko (奈津子; born 18 August 1989 in Chiba Prefecture) is a Japanese actress, singer and columnist who is a former member of the female idol group SDN48. Her real name is Natsuko Oki (大木 奈津子, Ōki Natsuko).

Natsuko is represented with Asia Business Partners. Her twin sister is Akiko, who is also an actress.

== SDN48 works ==
=== Singles ===
| Single | Under |
|---|---|
| "Eros no Trigger" | Under Girls A |
| "Awajishima no Tamanegi" | Under Girls B |
| "Onedari Champagne" | Under Girls A |
| "Yaritagari-ya-san" | Under Girls G |
| "Ue kara Natsuko" | Under Girls B |

=== Stage performances ===
| Name | Songs |
|---|---|
| SDN48 1st Stage 2-Kisei "Yūwaku no Garter" | "Black boy" |
| SDN48 1st Stage 2-Kisei "Yūwaku no Garter" | "I'm sure" |

=== As Natsuaki ===
Title
"Īkara Tomato Kue"

== Works ==
=== Videos ===
| Year | Title |
|---|---|
| 2007 | Natsuko |
| 2007 | Natsuko-Akiko with |
| 2008 | The Prologue: Nukumīzu 7 |
| 2008 | NTV Genic 2008 Natsuko |
| 2011 | Moe Natsu! |

== Filmography ==
=== TV dramas ===
| Year | Title | Role | Network |
|---|---|---|---|
| 2005 | Nobuta wo Produce | Akemi Nomura | NTV |
| 2006 | Gal Circle | Sumire | NTV |
| 2006 | Regatta: Kimi toita Eien | Natsu Shinobesa | TV Asahi |
| 2006 | Teppan Shōjo Akane!! | Yuzu Katsu | TBS |
| 2007 | Papa to Musume no 7-Kakan | Saori Hirata | TBS |
| 2008 | Karuta Komachi | Ryoko Ichijo | Fuji TV |
| 2008 | Hitmaker: Aku Yū Monogatari | The Peanuts member | NTV |
| 2008 | Kiri no Hi | Chiyo Sato | NTV |
| 2010 | Tomehane! Suzuri Kōkō Shodōbu | Yoshimi Hino | NHK |
| 2015 | e no Spirit | Herself | TBS |

=== Variety ===
| Year | Title | Network |
|---|---|---|
| 2005 | Toshiaki Karasawa Presents Kioku no Chikara II | NTV |
| 2006 | Disney 365 | Disney Channel |
| 2007 | Quiz! Hexagon II | Fuji TV |
| 2007 | The! Sekai Gyōten News | NTV |
| 2007 | Muchaburi! | TBS |
| 2007 | Nekketsu! Heisei Kyōiku Gakuin | Fuji TV |
| 2007 | Akashiya San-channeru | TBS |
| 2007 | Nekketsu! Hobby Stadium | tvk |
| 2008 | Moba Tare Great | NTV |
| 2008 | Masahiro Nakai no Black Comedy | NTV |
| 2009 | Hashigoman | tvk |
| 2010 | Suppon no Onna-tachi | TV Asahi |
| 2013 | Jinsei no Seikai TV | Fuji TV |
| 2015 | Asaichi | NHK |
| 2016 | Kaiun! Nan demo Kantei-dan | TV Tokyo |
| 2016 | Ichigen-san "Ohatsu" dekimasu ka? | TV Tokyo |

=== Films ===
| Year | Title | Role |
|---|---|---|
| 2007 | Tenshi ga kureta mono | Ayami |
| 2008 | Furefure Shōjo | Yuki |
| 2016 | Kuhana! | |

=== Stage ===
| Year | Title | Role |
|---|---|---|
| 2011 | Go, Jet! Go! Go! | |
| 2012 | Veronika wa Shinu koto ni shita | |
| 2012 | Kiss Me You –Ganbatta Shimpū-tachi e– | |
| 2012 | Mother –Tokkō no Haha: Tori Hama Tome Monogatari– | |
| 2012 | Doubt! Kokuritsu Kōan Joshi-kō | |
| 2012 | Gekka no Orchestra | |
| 2012 | Jikū Keisatsu Wecker χ Hōkō no Etranze | Time and Space Detective Alcione |
| 2012 | Go, Jet! Go! Go! Vol. 5 –Namida no Dry Martini: Girls ni Rival Shutsugen!?– | |
| 2013 | Oninpu-tachi no Lullaby | |
| 2013 | Busu no Mahōtsukai to Kime Kamisama | |
| 2014 | Ongaku Rōdoku Geki: Mijukuna, furunchu | |
| 2014 | Red –Shinsetsu Akatarō Monogatari– | Yatsuki |
| 2014 | Kami to Asobeba | |
| 2014 | Sainō ga nai! | |

=== Advertisements ===
| Year | Title |
|---|---|
| | NTT Higashinihon Denpo |
| 2007 | Japan Post "Shochū Mimai" |
| 2012 | AEON |
| 2013 | au Smart Pass |
| 2015 | Sasebo Eizō-sha |
| 2015 | Saxa |
| 2015 | Geo "Shingeki no Geo Campaign: Umi no Couple" |
| 2015 | Shōnan Biyō Geka "Shōna 'ndesu." |
| 2016 | Boku to Dragon |

=== Radio ===
| Year | Title | Network | Ref. |
|---|---|---|---|
| 2011 | Natsuaki Sunday Suppli | Walopp | |
| | Skyrocket Company | Tokyo FM | |
| 2015 | Mozaiku Night | Bay FM | |
| 2015 | Jun Teganuma no Unan Sattari Pants | Nack 5 | |
| 2016 | commons 10 High-Reso ni Kansuru Talk de Clammbon Mito to tomoni Yebisu Graden Place-nai de Kōkai-sei Shūroku ni Sanka | J-Wave | |

=== Online ===
| Year | Title | Role |
|---|---|---|
| 2008 | Osananajimi | Yuki Sugino |
| 2008 | The Boy In Wonderland | Sara |
| 2011 | A'! Tōdoroku Hōsōkyoku | |
| 2015 | Glico Pocky News | |

== Bibliography ==
=== Photo albums ===
| Year | Title | ISBN code |
|---|---|---|
| 2006 | futari | ISBN 978-4847029257 |

=== Magazines ===
| Year | Title |
|---|---|
| 2015 | Dime "New Goods Laboratory" |
| | MonoMax |
InRed
Frau
Josei Jishin
Digimono Station
