= Kohei Otomo =

Kohei Otomo 大友 康平
- Born: January 1, 1956 (age 70); Shiogama, Miyagi Prefecture, Japan
- Genre: Rock
- Occupations: Singer, actor, tarento
- Years active: 1980–present
- Label: Indies
- Member of: Hound Dog

Kohei Otomo (大友 康平, Ōtomo Kōhei; born January 1, 1956 in Shiogama, Miyagi Prefecture, Japan) is a Japanese vocalist, actor, and tarento represented by Iehokku. His maternal uncle is Naoki Prize writer Hideo Osabe. His wife is model Keiko Kinoshita.

== Discography ==
Year	Title	Notes
1997	"Heaven"	Solo debut single
1997	Heaven	First solo album
1999	"Take Me Out to the Ball Game: Boku o Yakyū ni Tsuretette"	
2001	"Yume no Betsu no Namae"	
	"Starting Over"	Cancelled
2008	"Rise"	
2008	J-Standard 70's	Cover album
2010	"Hana wa Saku"	

== Music provision ==
Title	Notes
Kayoco "Knockin' My Heart"	Composer
Naomi Kawashima "School Scandal"	Composer
Hiromoto Okubo "Diamond Hero"	Lyrics
Ryosuke Miki "Story: Kimi ni Au Tame no"	Lyrics
Monomane All Stars "I.D. Imitation Diamond"	Lyrics

== Filmography ==
=== Film ===
Year	Title	Role	Notes	Ref.
1990	Gold Rush	Junichi Muraki	Lead role; First lead role	
1999	Nodo Jiman	Keisuke Araki	Lead role	
2004	Break Through!	Radio station director		
2005	Aterui	Aterui		
2005	Irasshai mase, Kanja-sama.	Akio Onchi		
2007	Love Death			
2007	Speed Master	Tatsuji Sakurai		
2008	Jirō Naga Sangokushi	Sataro's numazu		
2009	Warau Keikan	Master Yasuda		
2011	Assassin			
2020	Not Quite Dead Yet	Yūichi Ayukawa		
2020	Under the Stars	Yūzō		
2021	The Master Plan	Miyazawa		
2025	Silent Night			

=== Drama ===
Year	Title	Role	Network	Notes
2000	Fly Kōkū Gakuen Graffiti	Takumi Hara	NHK	Lead role
2001	Josi Ana	Shinichi Takamizawa	Fuji TV	
2004	Return Match: Haisha Fukkatsu-sen		Fuji TV	Lead role
2007	O Banzai!	Toosu Yamagata	MBS	
2007	Benkyō Shite Itai!	Kosaku Ide	NHK	
2008	Yonmojinosatsui Hime-goto	Shinichi Kajiwara	TV Tokyo	
2008	Gosan	Toyama-bengoshi	TV Tokyo	
2008	Cat Street	Film director	NHK	
2009	Hōigaku Kyōshitsu no Jiken File	Tsutomu Matsuba	TV Asahi	
2009	Gekai Shugoro Hatomura	Koichi Ogasawara	Fuji TV	
2010	Akai Reikyūsha Series	Tadashi Yona	Fuji TV	
2010	Freeter, Ie wo Kau	Sadao Daietsu	Fuji TV	
2011	Bartender	Seiji Yamanouchi	TV Asahi	Episode 6
2011	Garo: Makai Senki	Shigezo Igari	TV Tokyo	Episode 8
2012	Saiko no Jinsei	Eisuke Tanaka	TBS	
2012	Joi Shoko Kuraishi Series	Kazuyoshi Akai	Fuji TV	
2012	Soko o Nantoka	Kotaro Sugawara	NHK BS Premium	
2013	Garo: Yami o Terasu Mono	Burai	TV Tokyo	
2013	Kumo no Kaidan	Eiji Muraki	NTV	
2013	Oh, My Dad!!	Kawabe	Fuji TV	Episode 8
2013	Katsuo	Takeo Yamamura	NHK	Lead role
2014	Konya wa Kokoro Dake Daite	Yukio Fukao	NHK BS Premium	
2015	Keiseizaimin no Otoko	Tanaka Giichi	NHK	Lead role
	44-sai no Cheerleader!!	Haruhiko Onodera	NHK BS Premium	
2016	Never Let Me Go	Vintage clothes store manager	TBS	Episode 5
2019	Sherlock: Untold Stories	Tomoji Koga	Fuji TV	Episode 9
2024	House of the Owl		Disney+	

=== Other television ===
Year	Title	Network	Notes
2007	Ongaku Variety Nagira TV Ano Jidai o Katare!	Kayo Pops Channel	
2009	Nanmon Kaiketsu! Go Kinjo no Sokojikara	NHK G	
2009	Iitabi Yume Kibun	TV Tokyo	
2009	Sports Tairiku: Tokyo Yakult Swallows, Ryoji Aikawa	NHK	Narration
2011	Gyōretsu no Dekiru Horitsu Sōdansho	NTV	
2011	Matsumoto Hitoshi no MaruMaru na Hanashi	Fuji TV	Narrator
2011	J-Pop Seishun no '80	NHK BS Premium	Moderator
2011	Athlete no Tamashī	NHK G	Narrator
2012	NHK Special	NHK G	Narrator

=== Radio series ===
Year	Title	Network	Notes
1980	Meiji Seika Teikyō The Beatles	NCB	
1986	School's Out	NCB	
2005	Kohei Otomo no Music Camp	NBS	

=== Advertisements ===
Year	Title	Notes
1998	Kikkoman "Triangle"	
2007	Dainihon Jochugiku "Katorisu"	
2011	NTT East "Hikari i Frame 2"	
2016	JA Bank "Nenkin Kōza Senior Ōen"	
