= Seven Days of a Daddy and a Daughter =

- Also known as: Papa to Musume no Nanokakan
- パパとムスメの７日間
- Genre: Drama and Comedy
- Based on: Papa to Musume no Nanokakan by Takahisa Igarashi
- Written by: Chiho Watanabe; Shuko Arai
- Directed by: Mahoko Takanari; Ken Yoshida
- Starring: Hiroshi Tachi; Yui Aragaki
- Ending theme: 星屑サンセット
- Composer: YUKI
- Country of origin: Japan
- Original language: Japanese
- No. of episodes: 7

Production
- Running time: 54 min (Japan)
- Production company: TBS

Original release
- Network: TBS
- Release: July 2 – August 19, 2007

Seven Days of a Daddy and a Daughter (Japanese: パパとムスメの７日間, Hepburn: Papa to Musume no Nanokakan) is a Japanese television drama series that was broadcast on TBS from 2007. The series is based on a novel by Takahisa Igarashi in 2006. The South Korean comedy film Daddy You, Daughter Me directed by Kim Hyeong-hyeop in 2017 was based on this series.

== Plot ==
Kyōichirō Kawahara (Hiroshi Tachi), a deputy director of public relations at a top cosmetic company, leads a project called "Rainbow Dream," aimed at young consumers. His daughter, Koume (Yui Aragaki), is a second-year student at Sakura Taipei High School and has a strained relationship with her father. During a family trip, a train accident causes them to swap bodies for seven days. How will they each navigate life as a middle-aged salaryman and a teenage high schooler?

== Cast ==
=== Main characters ===
- Kyōichirō Kawahara played by Hiroshi Tachi
  - A salaryman working as the deputy director of public relations at Bisei Cosmetic.
- Koume Kawahara played by Yui Aragaki
  - A second year student at Sakura Taipei High School and Kyōichirō's daughter.

=== Kawahara Family ===
- Reiko Kawahara played by Yumi Asō
  - Kyōichirō's wife and Koume's mother.
- Hisoka Kunieda played by Sumie Sasaki
  - Reiko's mother and Koume's grandmother who lives in the mountains of Chiba.
- Toshiko Kunieda played by Tatsuki Kasu
  - Reiko's Sister and Koume's Aunt.

=== Bisei Cosmetic ===
- Kosuke Nakajima played by Norito Yashima
  - Kyōichirō's superior at work.
- Kazuko Nishino played by Mayumi Sada
  - A member of the new product development project team, she likes Kyōichirō.
- Koichi Maeda played by Kenji Kaneko
  - A member of the new product development project team. He used to be in the sales department.
- Wataru Mifune played by Yūji Miyashita
  - A member of the new product development project team who likes to gossip.
- Kanako Shīna played by Imai Rika
  - A member of the new product development project team, she came into the group because she is the daughter of a major department's president.
- Hisako Itsaki played by Chie Īnuma
  - A member of the new product development project team, originally from the accounting department.
- Takeshi Watanabe played by Tōru Emori
  - 4th generation Chairman of Bisei cosmetics.

=== Sakura Taipei High School ===
- Oosugi Kenta (Ken) played by Shigeaki Kato
  - A high school third-year student in the football club. Koume has feelings for him.
- Ritsuko Nakayama played by Ayaka Morita
  - Koume's classmate, and childhood best friend.
- Hirata Saori played by Natsuko Oki
  - Koume's friend.
- Mr. Morozumi
  - Koume's Teacher.

== Episodes ==
| No. | Title | Directed by | Original release date | Ratings (%) |
|---|---|---|---|---|
| 1 | "マジ!? パパがあたしで、あたしがパパで―" | Shuko Arai and Yuichi Tokunaga | July 1, 2007 | 14.0% |
| 2 | "パパのせいで失恋!? ムスメのせいでリストラ!?" | Shuko Arai | July 8, 2007 | 12.8% |
| 3 | "パパのせいで留年!? ムスメのせいで夫婦の危機!?" | Chiho Watanabe | July 15, 2007 | 13.1% |
| 4 | "決戦!ムスメの御前会議!!" | Chiho Watanabe | July 22, 2007 | 14.1% |
| 5 | "「だって、あたし、小梅なんだもん!」 もう戻りたい7日目!嵐の告白!3者面談" | Shuko Arai | August 5, 2007 | 16.7% |
| 6 | "「これで、もとに戻れる!!...かも?」伝説の桃の秘密" | Chiho Watanabe | August 12, 2007 | 11.9% |
| 7 | "「パパ、ありがとう...」―7日間の秘密!" | Shuko Arai | August 19, 2007 | 14.5% |
