= Saiko no Jinsei =

- Also known as: Saikō no Jinsei no Owarikata: Ending Planner
- 最高の人生の終り方～エンディングプランナー～
- Genre: Mystery, slice of life, romantic comedy
- Starring: Tomohisa Yamashita; Nana Eikura; Takashi Sorimachi; Atsuko Maeda; Yuri Chinen; Ito Ono; Kohei Otomo; Tsutomu Yamazaki
- Country of origin: Japan
- Original language: Japanese

Original release
- Network: TBS
- Release: January 12, 2012

Saikō no Jinsei no Owarikata: Ending Planner (最高の人生の終り方～エンディングプランナー～, lit. The best way to complete a life: Ending planner) is a Japanese television drama series. It premiered on TBS on January 12, 2012. The drama revolves around the members of the Ihara family who operate a funeral parlor in Tokyo.

== Show Synopsis ==
The funeral parlor Ihara-ya (井原屋) has been run by Ihara Masato’s (Tomohisa Yamashita) family for generations. Masato grows to hate the family business due to the teasing he has for being "the undertaker's kid", and he leaves home early in life. The sudden death of his estranged father and the disappearance of his older brother Kento (Takashi Sorimachi) leave the Ihara-ya in Masato's reluctant hands.

The Ihara-ya has close ties with the police and mostly handles the bodies of people who have died under mysterious or unexplained circumstances. On occasions, when the police simply classify the deaths as accidental, Masato tries to find out the truth for the sake of the surviving family, even though he knows that he is being meddlesome.

Masato ends up dealing with these silent bodies, the painful reasons behind their deaths, and the harsh realities of the world together with rookie detective Sakamaki Yuki (Nana Eikura). As he does so, he starts to face up to his own life and family.

== Cast ==
Actor	Character	Notes
Tomohisa Yamashita	Ihara Masato (井原真人)	Second son of the Ihara family; takes over Ihara-ya after his father's death; formerly a high-level employee in an izakaya chain
Nana Eikura	Sakamaki Yuki (坂巻優樹)	Rookie detective; former acquaintance of Masato
Takashi Sorimachi	Ihara Kento (井原健人)	Eldest son of the Ihara family; Masato's half-brother; worked at the Ihara-ya since graduating from high school; mysteriously disappeared two months before his father's death
Atsuko Maeda	Ihara Haruka (井原晴香)	Middle child and eldest daughter of the Ihara family; looks after the accounts of Ihara-ya; has a minor physical disability
Yuri Chinen	Ihara Hayato (井原隼人)	Youngest son of the Ihara family; university student; left home early in life like Masato
Ito Ono	Ihara Momoko (井原桃子)	Youngest child of the Ihara family
Kohei Otomo	Tanaka Eisuke (田中英輔)	Ihara-ya employee
Tsutomu Yamazaki	Iwata Itsuro (岩田逸郎)	Former police chief; Ihara family friend
Keizo Kanie	Ihara Kotaro (井原浩太郎)	Ihara patriarch; Masato's father
Kensei Mikami	Nagamine Jun (長峰 潤)	TBA
Sansei Shiomi	Kinohara Yoshio (木野原義男)	TBA
Isono Kiroko	Kagawa Yuko (香川夕子)	TBA
Rei Okamoto	Mizuno Kanako (水野可南子)	TBA
Mami Hashimoto	Murauchi Yayoi (村内弥生)	TBA
Masaya Kikawada	Kawahara Tatsuho (川原達法)	TBA

== Crew ==
- Screenwriter: Chiho Watanabe
- Directors: Yasuharu Ishii, Ryutaro Kawashima, Yamamuro Daisuke
- Producer: Hidenori Iyoda

== Episodes ==
Episode	Air date	Title	Outline	Rating
1	January 12, 2012	TBA	TBA	15.3
