= World of Delight =

- Poster

Japanese name
- Kanji: レインツリーの国
Transcriptions
- Revised Hepburn: Reintsurī no Kuni
- Directed by: Yoshishige Miyake
- Screenplay by: Chiho Watanabe
- Based on: Raintree no Kuni by Hiro Arikawa
- Cinematography: Hiroo Yanagida
- Music by: Yugo Kannno
- Distributed by: Showgate
- Release date: November 21, 2015
- Running time: 108 minutes
- Country: Japan
- Language: Japanese
- Box office: ¥124 million

World of Delight (レインツリーの国, Reintsurī no Kuni; Raintree Country) is a 2015 Japanese youth romance film directed by Yoshishige Miyake. It is based on the novel Raintree no Kuni by Hiro Arikawa. It was released on November 21, 2015.

The film is a love story between Nobuyuki, who is a hearing person, and Hitomi, who is late-deafened. Author Hiro Arikawa's husband twice experienced (temporary) sudden hearing loss, which informed her writing.

== On filming ==
Yuta Tamamori said of his character Nobuyuki, "He is straight and says what he thinks clearly. He is the complete opposite of me. I've never played a businessman before, so I asked my friends beforehand how difficult it would be. It's a warm movie about two very straight people in love, so I hope it will make people who watch it swoon". Mariya Nishiuchi said, "Playing the role of Hitomi made me think about the importance of love and words. I'm curious to see how Hitomi's step-by-step progress reached everyone's hearts, so I'd be very happy to hear your thoughts on it."

Tamamori had difficulty with intonation in the Kansai dialect, saying the script was black with intonations added in pen. Co-star and Kansai native Kataoka Ainosuke VI gave him advice, and said, "Tamamori-kun was a really nice young man and eager to learn," and added, "I want you to become a member of the Kansai people".

Room interiors were created with great care for the shoot. Kousaka's house, which she moved to Tokyo from Osaka, was made to have a lived-in feel without being too stylish. Osaka-like accessories were placed on the set of her parents' house in Osaka. In Hitomi's house, the direction and arrangement of the furniture were considered after talking to a hearing-impaired person.

== Plot ==
Businessman Nobuyuki Sakisaka sometimes helps out at the hospital. While cleaning out his parents' house, he finds a book he once loved, but notices the bottom volume is missing. As he reads through the upper and middle volumes, he feels compelled to read the lower volume. Searching the internet he finds the website "Raintree Country," of which Hitomi is administrator. He is moved by the comments on the site to message Hitomi. Hitomi replies, and they enjoy talking about their favorite works.

Nobuyuki tells Hitomi he wants to meet her, but she stops replying. Hitomi has had a hard life because of her hearing handicap and is reluctant to meet people. Her life changes little by little when she meets Nobuyuki, who cares about Hitomi as a woman.

== Cast ==
Nobuyuki Sakisaka acted by Yuta Tamamori
Main character. His family runs a hair salon. He is a Kansai native from the bottom up. He is generous and mild-mannered, but when he gets angry, he is furious. His father had surgery for a brain tumor, but experienced partial amnesia when he woke up, forgetting Nobuki entirely and believing he's a staff at the hospital. He was searching the Internet for feedback on a light novel she read in junior high school, "Fairy Game," and came across a website called "Raintree no Kuni.
Rika Hitomi acted by Mariya Nishiuchi
She is the administrator of the blog "Raintree Country". When she was in the first grade of high school, she had a slip-and-fall accident while climbing a mountain with her parents, which resulted in sensorineural hearing loss in both ears. She wears hearing aids and grows her hair long so that others cannot see her hearing aids. She begins exchanging e-mails with Nobuyuki, who shares her thoughts on how "The Fairy Game" should end. After meeting Nobuyuki, her views about her own hearing loss/deafness change. Her handle is "Hitomi".
Misako acted by Kanna Mori
Nobuyuki's colleague at work. She is interested in him.
Fumiko Sakisaka acted by Atsuko Takahata
Mother of Nobuyuki. She runs a beauty salon. She has a bright and energetic personality.
Yukari Hitomi acted by Yumi Asō
Rika's mother. She is always concerned about her daughter. She has a kind personality.

== Staff ==
- Baced on - "World of Delight" by Hiro Arikawa (Shinchosha)
- Director - Kiyoshige Miyake
- Screenplay - Chiho Watanabe
- Photography - Hiroo Yanagida
- Lighting - Yasushi Miyao
- Sound Recording - Shigeru Abe
- Art Director - Chie Matsumoto
- Editing - Shinichi Fushima
- Music - Yugo Kanno
- Theme song - "In the End It's You" by Kis-My-Ft2 (Avex Trax)
- Film distributor - Showgate (now:Hakuhodo DY Music & Pictures)

== Reception ==
The film was number-two on its opening weekend by box office gross behind Girls und Panzer der Film, with ¥124 million, and number-one by admissions, with 91,700.

== Related Products ==
With Japanese subtitles and audio guidance released May 25, 2016 by Avex Inc.

- First Edition (A mouse pad to fall in love with" and a 24-page booklet are included in the package.)
  - Two-disc Blu-ray set (one full-length feature disc and one bonus disc)
  - Two-disc DVD set (one full-length feature disc and one bonus disc)
- Normal Edition
  - One disc Blu-ray (one full-length feature disc)
  - One disc DVD (one full-length feature disc)
