= Threads of Destiny =

Japanese media franchise

- Promotional poster for the 2008 television drama and movie project

赤い糸 (Akai Ito)
- Genre: Romance
- Serial novel

Akai Ito
- Written by: Mei
- Published by: Goma Books
- Magazine: Mahō no Toshōkan
- Published: 2007
- Volumes: 5
- Manga

Akai Ito
- Written by: Mei
- Illustrated by: Cocco Kashiwaya
- Published by: Goma Books
- Imprint: Orion Comics
- Original run: November 1, 2008 – May 29, 2009
- Volumes: 6
- Television drama
- Directed by: Shosuke Murakami; Yasuhiro Kawamura
- Produced by: Masayuki Sekiya; Yoshihiko Taneda; Aya Moriyasu
- Written by: Ritsuko Hanzawa; Chiho Watanabe
- Music by: Yugo Kanno
- Original network: Fuji TV
- Original run: December 6, 2008 – February 28, 2009
- Episodes: 11
- Live-action film
- Directed by: Shosuke Murakami
- Produced by: Masayuki Sekiya; Yoshihiko Taneda; Aya Moriyasu
- Written by: Chiho Watanabe
- Music by: Yugo Kanno
- Released: December 20, 2008
- Runtime: 108 mins.
- Video game

Akai Ito DS
- Developer: Alchemist
- Genre: Adventure
- Platform: Nintendo DS
- Released: JP: December 25, 2008
- Video game

Akai Ito Destiny DS
- Developer: Alchemist
- Genre: Adventure
- Platform: Nintendo DS
- Released: JP: March 26, 2009

Threads of Destiny (Japanese: 赤い糸, Hepburn: Akai Ito; lit. "Red Thread") is a 2006 cell phone novel series written by Mei. Akai Ito was first published on the website Mahō no Toshōkan, where it became the #1 ranked story within the first month of publication. The popularity of Akai Ito has been associated with the boom of cell phone novels in the mid-2000s in Japan. The novel was later published as a series of five books, which sold a consecutive total of 1.8 million physical copies.

The success of Akai Ito has led to a manga adaptation by Cocco Kashiwaya, a television and film project released under the title Threads of Destiny, and two video game adaptations.

== Plot ==
Middle school student Mei Takemiya has a crush on her childhood friend Yūya, but after he confesses to her older sister, Haruna, she withdraws to the company of her circle of friends: Riku, Mia, Yuri, Natsuki, Mitsuru, Asami, and Sara. One day, she becomes acquainted with her classmate, Atsushi Nishino, and the two realize they have a lot in common, including sharing the same birthday and encountering each other when they were young. As Mei and Atsushi become closer, they fall in love and believe to be each other's soulmate.

However, when Atsushi's troubled home life catches up to him, he distances himself from Mei. Mei begins dating Riku, who becomes increasingly abusive, while their circle of friends encounter situations involving drugs, rape, and attempted suicide. In spite of this, Mei struggles to hold onto her belief that she will overcome her obstacles, and the red string of fate will eventually lead her to her true love.

== Characters ==
=== Main characters ===
Mei Takemiya (竹宮芽衣, Takemiya Mei)
Portrayed by: Nao Minamisawa
Mei is a gentle and kind middle school student who believes in destiny.
Atsushi Nishino (西野敦史, Nishino Atsushi)
Portrayed by: Junpei Mizobata; Voiced by: Jun Fukuyama
Atsushi is a quiet boy in Mei's class who is nicknamed Akkun (アッくん). His mother is a drug addict, and he spends his time taking care of her.

=== Supporting characters ===
Riku Takahashi (高橋陸, Riku Takahashi)
Portrayed by: Ryo Kimura; Voiced by: Masakazu Morita
Riku is one of Mei's friends and is nicknamed Taka-chan (たかチャン). He has been secretly in love with her and they decide to date after Mei and Atsushi break up. However, in spite of his cheerful personality, he starts growing possessive of Mei and eventually starts becoming abusive towards her.
Natsuki Fujiwara (藤原夏樹, Fujiwara Natsuki)
Portrayed by: Tomo Yanagishita; Voiced by: Hiroki Takahashi
Yuri Nakanishi (中西優梨, Nakanishi Yuri)
Portrayed by: Kasumi Suzuki; Voiced by: Ai Maeda
Mitsuru Kamiya (神谷充, Kamiya Mitsuru)
Portrayed by: Ryo Tajima; Voiced by: Naozumi Takahashi
Mia Yamagishi (山岸美亜, Yamagishi Mia)
Portrayed by: Rei Okamoto; Voiced by: Yuko Sanpei
Asami Tadokoro (田所麻美, Tadakoro Asami)
Portrayed by: Anna Ishibashi; Voiced by: Miki Nagasawa
Sara Nakagawa (中川沙良, Nakagawa Sara)
Portrayed by: Nanami Sakuraba; Voiced by: Kana Hanazawa
Sara is one of Mei's friends and is in love with Riku. Upon discovering he is in love with Mei, she attempts suicide but survives the incident with amnesia.
Yūya Shinozaki (篠崎悠哉, Shinozaki Yūya)
Portrayed by: Hiroshi Yazaki; Voiced by: Daisuke Hirakawa
Yūya is Mei and Haruna's childhood friend, and Mei has been in love with him since childhood. However, he is in love with Haruna and confesses to her.
Haruna Takemiya (竹宮春菜, Takemiya Haruna)
Portrayed by: Sayuri Iwata; Voiced by: Mamiko Noto
Haruna is Mei's older sister.

=== Minor characters ===
Miyabi Kawaguchi (川口ミヤビ, Kawaguchi Miyabi)
Portrayed by: Kaoru Hirata
Shu Yasuda (安田愁, Yasuda Shu)
Portrayed by: Ryuya Wakaba
Koichi Murakoshi (村越浩市, Murakoshi Kenji)
Portrayed by: Kenji Matsuda
Natsumi Nishino (西野夏実, Nishino Natsumi)
Portrayed by: Mirai Yamamoto
Takamichi Morisaki (森崎孝道, Morisaki Takamichi)
Portrayed by: Shigemitsu Ogi
Sachiko Takemiya (竹宮幸子, Takemiya Sachiko)
Portrayed by: Noriko Watanabe

== Media ==
=== Novels ===
Akai Ito is written by Mei and was posted on the website Mahō no Toshōkan in 2006. Throughout its run, 3.3 million readers were subscribed to the story, and it was consistently ranked at #1 on the website. Media referenced Akai Ito as one of the leaders of the "cell phone novel" phenomenon in the mid-2000s along with Koizora. Akai Ito had over 16 million views by 2008. The chapters were later compiled and released as bound volumes by Goma Books. The consecutive sales of all books sold more than 1.8 million copies.

| No. | Title | Japanese release date | Japanese ISBN |
|---|---|---|---|
| 1 | Akai Ito (Ue) (赤い糸（上）) | January 26, 2007 (original release); October 18, 2007 (omnibus) | 978-4777105502 (original release); ISBN 978-4777107704 (omnibus) |
| 2 | Akai Ito (Shita) (赤い糸（下）) | January 26, 2007 (original release); October 18, 2007 (omnibus) | 978-4777105519 (original release); ISBN 978-4777107704 (omnibus) |
| 3 | Akai Ito Destiny (Ue) (赤い糸 destiny（上）) | May 25, 2007 | 978-4777106431 |
| 4 | Akai Ito Destiny (Shita) (赤い糸destiny（下）) | May 25, 2007 | 978-4777106448 |
| 5 | Akai Ito Precious (赤い糸precious) | November 30, 2007 (original release); April 26, 2009 (re-release) | 978-4777108176 (original release); ISBN 978-4777151288 (re-release) |

==== Re-releases ====
Goma Books re-released the Akai Ito series under the Goma Bunko imprint, with stories divided into 3 books, on April 28, 2009.

| No. | Title | Japanese release date | Japanese ISBN |
|---|---|---|---|
| 1 | Akai Ito (Ue) (赤い糸（上）) | April 28, 2009 | 978-4777151066 |
| 2 | Akai Ito (Chu) (赤い糸（中）) | April 28, 2009 | 978-4777151073 |
| 3 | Akai Ito (Shita) (赤い糸（下）) | April 28, 2009 | 978-4777151080 |
| 4 | Akai Ito Destiny (Ue) (赤い糸 destiny（上）) | April 28, 2009 | 978-4777151257 |
| 5 | Akai Ito Destiny (Chu) (赤い糸destiny（中）) | April 28, 2009 | 978-4777151264 |
| 6 | Akai Ito Destiny (Shita) (赤い糸destiny（下）) | April 28, 2009 | 978-4777151271 |

=== Manga ===
A manga adaptation illustrated by Cocco Kashiwaya was released from 2008 to 2009 in bound volumes published by Goma Books under the Orion Comics imprint.

| No. | Japanese release date | Japanese ISBN |
|---|---|---|
| 1 | November 1, 2008 | 978-4777190751 |
| 2 | November 1, 2008 | 978-4777190768 |
| 3 | November 29, 2008 | 978-4777190775 |
| 4 | January 30, 2009 | 978-4777190782 |
| 5 | March 30, 2009 | 978-4777190973 |
| 6 | May 29, 2009 | 978-4777191055 |

=== Television series ===
A live-action television drama series and a film adaptation was announced in April 2008 and produced simultaneously. Production for both adaptations completed on November 20, 2008. The television broadcast aired on Fuji TV from December 6, 2008, to February 28, 2009, for a total of 11 episodes. Both the television series and the film's theme song is "366 Days" (366日, San-byaku roku-jū-roku nichi) by HY. A DVD box set for the television series was released on July 15, 2009, and it charted at #68 on the Oricon Weekly DVD Charts.

| No. | Title | Directed by | Written by | Original release date | Japan viewership rating (Kanto region) |
|---|---|---|---|---|---|
| 1 | "I Fell in Love With You When We First Met"; Transliteration: "Anata ni Deau Tame ni Koi o Suru" (Japanese: 貴方に出会うために恋をする) | Shosuke Murakami | Ritsuko Hanazawa | December 6, 2008 | 7.5% |
| 2 | "The Chocolate That Heals Loneliness"; Transliteration: "Kodoku o Iyasu Chokorēto" (Japanese: 孤独を癒やすチョコレート) | Shosuke Murakami | Ritsuko Hanazawa | December 13, 2008 | 8.4% |
| 3 | "When the Two of Us Met"; Transliteration: "Deatteita Futari" (Japanese: 出会っていた二人) | Shosuke Murakami | Chiho Watanabe | December 20, 2008 | 7.8% |
| 4 | "In the Nagasaki Sky"; Transliteration: "Nagasaki no Sora ni" (Japanese: 長崎の空に) | Shosuke Murakami | Chiho Watanabe | January 10, 2009 | 10.0% |
| 5 | "Ineffective Drugs"; Transliteration: "Kikanai Kusuri" (Japanese: 効かないクスリ) | Yasuhiro Kawamura | Chiho Watanabe | January 17, 2009 | 10.8% |
| 6 | "Broken Threads"; Transliteration: "Togireta Ito" (Japanese: 途切れた糸) | Yasuhiro Kawamura | Chiho Watanabe | January 24, 2009 | 8.0% |
| 7 | "A New Love Begins"; Transliteration: "Atarashī Koi no Hajimari" (Japanese: 新しい恋の始まり) | Yasuhiro Kawamura | Chiho Watanabe | January 31, 2009 | 8.4% |
| 8 | "Threads of Destiny"; Transliteration: "Akai Ito" (Japanese: 赤い糸) | Shosuke Murakami | Chiho Watanabe | February 7, 2009 | 8.0% |
| 9 | "366 Days"; Transliteration: "San-byaku roku-jū-roku nichi" (Japanese: 366日) | Shosuke Murakami | Chiho Watanabe | February 14, 2009 | 8.9% |
| 10 | "The Children Who Will Never Grow Up"; Transliteration: "Otona ni Narenai Kodomo-tachi" (Japanese: 大人になれない子供たち) | Yasuhiro Kawamura | Chiho Watanabe | February 21, 2009 | 7.0% |
| 11 | "A Love That I'm Fine With No Matter What"; Transliteration: "Sore Demo Ii to Omoeru Koi" (Japanese: それでもいいと思える恋) | Shosuke Murakami | Chiho Watanabe | February 28, 2009 | 8.9% |

=== Film ===
A continuation of the first half of the television broadcast was released as a theatrical film on December 20, 2008, and concluded with a "To be continued" intertitle for the second half of the television series. The film was produced simultaneously with the television series and concluded production in November 2008. The film was released on DVD in standard and special editions on May 29, 2009, charting at #29 on the Oricon Weekly DVD Charts. Russell Edwards from Variety called some of the secondary plot points "ridiculous", but found the actors likeable.

=== Video games ===
A video game adaptation titled Akai Ito DS (赤い糸DS) was produced by Alchemist released on the Nintendo DS on December 25, 2008. The game was first announced on October 14, 2008, and is a visual novel dating simulation where the player takes control of Mei's choices while navigating through the story.

A sequel, titled Akai Ito Destiny DS, was released on the Nintendo DS on March 26, 2009. The limited edition sold by Animate came with a drama CD featuring Jun Fukuyama, Hiroki Takahashi, and Tomokazu Sugita, the voice actors of Atsushi, Natsuki, and Kaito.
