= Library Wars: The Last Mission =

- Poster
- 図書館戦争 THE LAST MISSION
- Directed by: Shinsuke Sato
- Based on: Library War by Hiro Arikawa (writer) and Sukumo Adabana (illustrator)
- Starring: Junichi Okada; Nana Eikura; Kei Tanaka; Sota Fukushi; Naomi Nishida; Jun Hashimoto; Tao Tsuchiya; Aoi Nakamura; Kazuyuki Aijima; Kiyoshi Kodama; Tori Matsuzaka; Chiaki Kuriyama; Kōji Ishizaka
- Distributed by: Toho
- Release date: October 10, 2015
- Running time: 120 minutes
- Country: Japan
- Language: Japanese
- Box office: ¥1.58 billion

Library Wars: The Last Mission (図書館戦争 THE LAST MISSION, Toshokan Sensō The Last Mission) is a 2015 Japanese romance action comedy film directed by Shinsuke Sato. The film is a sequel of Library Wars (2013), with both films based on the light novel series Library War written by Hiro Arikawa and illustrated by Sukumo Adabana. The film was released on October 10, 2015.

== Plot ==
It is a time in which the expression of thought is censored, and the media is tightly controlled. Bearing up under a harsh regimen of instruction under the terrifying Atsushi Dojo, Iku Kasahara is now a full-fledged member of the Library Defense ‘Task Force’, and divides her time between hard physical training and regular library work. Dojo and the rest of the Task Force are ordered to guard a public exhibition featuring ‘The Handbook of Library Law’, a book widely seen as the symbol of freedom, of which there is only one existing copy. The assignment seems easy enough, but this is in fact a trap designed to wipe out and thus disband the Task Force and restore a twisted society to the correct moral path.

== Cast ==
- Junichi Okada - Atsushi Dojo
- Nana Eikura - Iku Kasahara
- Kei Tanaka - Mikihisa Komaki
- Sota Fukushi - Hikaru Tezuka
- Naomi Nishida - Maki Orikuchi
- Jun Hashimoto - Ryusuke Kenta
- Tao Tsuchiya - Marie Nakazawa
- Aoi Nakamura - Shuji Asahina
- Kazuyuki Aijima - Hajime Biitani
- Kiyoshi Kodama
- Tori Matsuzaka - Satoshi Tezuka
- Chiaki Kuriyama - Asako Shibasaki

== Reception ==
Library Wars: The Last Mission grossed US$16.8 million in Japan. The film was number-one on its opening weekend at the Japanese box office, with US$2.75 million. It was also number-one on the second weekend, with US$1.45 million.
