= Sukumo Adabana =

Japanese manga artist (born 1977)

Sukumo Adabana (徒花 スクモ, Adabana Sukumo) (born 1977) is a Japanese manga artist from Nagano, Japan. In 2002, he won the gold prize in the tenth round of the illustration division of the Dengeki Novel Prize under the name Sukumo Shiina (シイナスクモ, Shiina Sukumo). In 2006, he debuted publicly as the artist for the Toshokan Sensō series of light novels written by Hiro Arikawa. Adabana has worked closely with Arikawa since then, illustrating her novels Kujira no Kare and Hankyū Densha as well.
