= Utatama =

- Film poster
- Directed by: Makoto Tanaka
- Written by: Makoto Tanaka
- Produced by: Naoki Sato; Yoichi Arishige; Kiyoe Noma; Ryusei Kawakami
- Starring: Kaho; Gori; Hiroko Yakushimaru; Hideo Ishiguro
- Cinematography: Kazuhiro Suzuki
- Edited by: Masahiro Onaga
- Music by: Yûsuke Hayashi
- Production company: Nikkatsu
- Distributed by: Nikkatsu
- Release date: April 5, 2008 (Japan)
- Running time: 120 minutes
- Country: Japan
- Language: Japanese

Utatama (うた魂♪), also known as Sing, Salmon, Sing!, is a 2008 Japanese comedy film written and directed by Makoto Tanaka. The film stars Kaho and Gori in a story about a school choir competition and features music from Kōsaku Yamada, Yutaka Ozaki, Mongol800, and Gospellers. Nikkatsu released the film on April 5, 2008, in Japan.

== Premise ==
Kasumi loves singing until she is given a photo of herself mid-song by a boy she likes. Embarrassed, she quits, but is later encouraged to rejoin by Hiroshi, the leader of a rival all-male choir.

== Cast ==
- Kaho as Kasumi Ogino
- Gori as Hiroshi Gondo
- Hiroko Yakushimaru as Yoko Senuma
- Hideo Ishiguro as Junichi Makimura
- Akiko as Momiji Matsumoto
- Akari Hayami as Kasumi Ogino (young)
- Sayuri Iwata as Rena Aoyagi
- Eri Tokunaga as Mitsuki Nomura
- Rie Tomosaka as Kyoko Kuroki
- Hikaru Yamamoto as Sakurako Yamada
- Yukiko Yabe as Yuki Shinohara
- Yuka Rikuna as Miyuki Maeda
- Hiroki Ebata as Atsushi Kouroki
- Kanpei Hazama as Chiezo Ogino
- Takashi Kodama as Eiji Tsurumoto
- Masashi Arifuku as High school principal
- Yōji Tanaka as Cameraman
- Saki Fujimoto as Female student
- Ayaka Miyoshi
- Takashi Yamanaka
- Shinichi Inoue
- Manami Teramoto
- Masaaki Akahori
- Bobby

== Critical reception ==
Reviewing Utatama for The Japan Times, Mark Schilling gave the film three out of five stars, describing it as "closer to a straight-ahead seishun eiga (youth film)" compared to Swing Girls and highlighted its "big chorus competition" scene as "soul-stirring".
