= Jun to Ai =

- Genre: Drama
- Written by: Kazuhiko Yukawa
- Directed by: Yoshiro Yukawa
- Starring: Natsuna; Shunsuke Kazama; Aiko Morishita; Mokomichi Hayami; Maryjun Takahashi; Shu Watanabe; Mayumi Wakamura; Kimiko Yo; Tetsuya Takeda; Hiroshi Tachi
- Opening theme: "Ichi-ban Chikaku Ni" by HY
- Country of origin: Japan
- Original language: Japanese
- No. of episodes: 151

Production
- Producer: Toshihiko Yamamoto
- Running time: 15 minutes
- Production company: NHK Osaka

Original release
- Network: NHK
- Release: October 1, 2012 – March 30, 2013

Jun to Ai (純と愛) is a Japanese television drama series. It debuted on October 1, 2012, and was broadcast until March 30, 2013. It is about a girl named Jun Kanō, raised in Miyakojima, Okinawa, who moves to Osaka to work in a hotel. There she meets a man named Itoshi Machida, with whom she falls in love. It is the 87th NHK Asadora.

== Synopsis ==
Jun Kanō was raised in Miyakojima, where her grandfather ran a small hotel that inspired her life's ambition to create a hotel that would serve as a "magical land" for people. Often fighting with her father Zenkō, Jun went to Osaka for college and eventually finds work at the Osaki Plaza Hotel, where she often gets in trouble for her unorthodox ways.

In Osaka she meets an odd young man, Itoshi, who can't look straight at people because he says he can read people's inner feelings. First finding him weird, Jun eventually becomes attracted to Itoshi, who himself falls in love with Jun, even though her name reminds him of his dead twin brother Jun. The two ultimately get married against the objections of his mother Taeko, a powerful lawyer who rules over her family with an unloving, iron fist. It is Taeko who helps a foreign company take over the Osaki Hotel, ruining Jun's dreams for that hotel.

Finding out that her father plans to sell the Miyakojima hotel, Jun and Itoshi move back to Okinawa, but they fail to prevent the sale. Depressed, Jun wanders back to Osaka and by chance ends up at the Satoya Hotel, a rundown but friendly inn catering to people from Okinawa. Jun decides to make Satoya her "magical land" but has to face many problems along the way. Having helped bring her brother Tadashi and his Filipina girlfriend Mariya together, she has to repair their marriage when Tadashi has an affair. She helps Taeko when she has a nervous breakdown at Satoya. When her mother Harumi begins to show signs of Alzheimer's disease, Jun and Itoshi try to care for her despite the actions of Jun's seemingly uncaring father. Zenkō, however, dies trying to save Harumi when she mistakenly falls into the sea.

Another crisis looms when Sato, the owner of Satoya, suddenly declares she will close the hotel, just when its motley group of residents had grown to depend on it. Jun convinces her to keep it open, rallying those around her, each of whom discover a special skill they can contribute to the inn. When Satoya burns down in a fire, however, the shock to Jun is enormous. Thinking that any hotel she works at goes bad, she declares she's given up her dream and will never touch a hotel again. Her state of mind almost leads to a divorce with Itoshi.

One of the former residents of Satoya, however, turns out to be a famous designer who owns a run-down villa on Miyakojima that she offers to let Jun turn into an inn. Spurred on by the denizens of Satoya, who promise to help, Jun and Itoshi head off to Miyakojima with her family to refurbish the villa. Things don't proceed smoothly. Just when much of the refurbishing is done and most of the plans made, Itoshi is diagnosed with a brain tumor and must undergo surgery. While he survives the operation, he remains in a coma. His friends, including the residents of Satoya and the employees at Osaki Hotel, come to the inn to provide encouragement. Just as it is about to open, Jun declares her intention to keep on fighting, believing in a miracle for Jun and the chance to really create a "magical land" at the inn. In the last moments of the drama, Itoshi's hands move and grasp Jun's hand. Whether he awakes or not is left ambiguous.

== Cast ==
- Natsuna as Jun Kanō (later Machida)
- Shunsuke Kazama as Itoshi Machida, her husband
- Tetsuya Takeda as Zenkō Kanō, Jun's father
- Aiko Morishita as Harumi Kanō, Jun's mother
- Susumu Taira as Kōji Maeda, Jun's grandfather
- Mokomichi Hayami as Tadashi Kanō, Jun's older brother
- Maryjun Takahashi as Mariya, Tadashi's wife
- Shu Watanabe as Tsuyoshi Kanō, Jun's younger brother
- Hiroshi Tachi as Shinichirō Ōsaki, president of the Osaki Plaza Hotel
- Yō Yoshida as Fujiko Kirino, Jun's supervisor at the hotel
- Henry Fowler as Mr. Fowler, a guest at the hotel
- Yū Shirota as Yasuzaku Mizuno, the hotel concierge
- Mayumi Wakamura as Taeko Machida, Itoshi's mother
- Rei Okamoto as Makoto Machida, Itoshi's sister
- Kimiko Yo as Sato Uehara, owner of the Satoya Hotel
- Yōji Tanaka as Shinobu Aida, the Satoya chef

== Reception ==
Jun to Ai averaged a 17.1% rating for the series. It was the lowest rating for an Asadora in three years.

| Preceded by Umechan Sensei | Asadora; 1 October 2012 – 30 March 2013 | Succeeded by Amachan |
