= The Gentle 12 =

- Film poster
- Directed by: Shun Nakahara
- Screenplay by: Kōki Mitani; Tokyo Sunshine Boys
- Based on: Juninin no Yasashii Nihonjin by Kōki Mitani
- Produced by: Yutaka Okada; Kozaburo Sasaoka; Yasutaka Tarumi; Hiroaki Jinno; Naoya Narita
- Starring: Sansei Shiomi; Kazuyuki Aijima; Koichi Ueda; Kouichi Nihei; Mariko Nakamura
- Cinematography: Kenji Takama
- Edited by: Isao Tomita; Nobuko Tomita
- Music by: Kozaburo Matsumoto
- Production companies: Nippon TV; New Century Producers; Suntory
- Distributed by: Argo Pictures
- Release date: December 14, 1991 (Japan)
- Running time: 118 minutes
- Country: Japan
- Language: Japanese

The Gentle 12 (Japanese: 12人の優しい日本人, Hepburn: Juninin no Yasashii Nihonjin), also known as 12 Gentle Japanese, is a 1991 Japanese courtroom suspense comedy film directed by Shun Nakahara and written by Kōki Mitani and Tokyo Sunshine Boys, based on Mitani's play of the same name. It is a parody of the 1957 Sidney Lumet film 12 Angry Men. The film stars Sansei Shiomi, Kazuyuki Aijima, Koichi Ueda, Kouichi Nihei and Mariko Nakamura. Kozaburo Matsumoto composed the film's score, while its piano instrumentals were performed by Elżbieta Stefańska. The Gentle 12 was theatrically released by Argo Pictures on December 14, 1991, in Japan.

== Plot ==
Twelve ordinary Japanese jurors are summoned to serve in a murder trial. The defendant is a bar hostess accused of pushing her ex-husband into an oncoming truck. After the trial, they are sequestered in a room and the verdict is taken, which is quickly and unanimously decided to be "not guilty." Everyone has business to attend to, and the jurors are nice people unwilling to believe a woman could commit murder, so they quickly prepare to leave. However, Juror #2 has second thoughts, stopping everyone and saying, "Let's discuss this."

Juror #2 takes the initiative to convince their peers that the woman is, in fact, guilty. As the jurors discuss the case, it becomes clear that the other eleven jurors all sympathize with the defendant and chose a 'not guilty' verdict based on those sympathies and not the evidence itself. The jurors once again consider the circumstances of the case. Gradually, more and more of them begin to lean toward a "guilty" verdict for premeditated murder.

However, some jurors still waver between "guilty" and "not guilty." Upon further argumentation, the circumstances that had seemed unfavorable to the defendant were in fact evidence of her innocence. Furthermore, it becomes clear that Juror #2, who initially asked for the "discussion", is projecting his own family troubles onto the defendant and harboring an irrational grudge.

After much deliberation, the jurors are convinced once again of the defendant's innocence and unanimously vote for acquittal. After voting and submitting their statements, the twelve jurors each go home satisfied.

== Cast ==
- Sansei Shiomi as Juror #1
- Kazuyuki Aijima as Juror #2
- Koichi Ueda as Juror #3
- Kouichi Nihei as Juror #4
- Mariko Nakamura as Juror #5
- Hiroshi Okochi as Juror #6
- Zen Kajihara as Juror #7
- Yorie Yamashita as Juror #8
- Katsumi Muramatsu as Juror #9
- Michiko Hayashi as Juror #10
- Etsushi Toyokawa as Juror #11
- Yoshihiro Katō as Juror #12

== Background ==
Kōki Mitani wrote the original play for his theatrical troupe Tokyo Sunshine Boys. The play was a parody of 12 Angry Men, but was also intended to answer the question, "What if Japan had a jury system like America's?" It premiered at Theater Sun Mall in Tokyo on July 30, 1990. It was performed throughout 1990, 1991 and 1992, and then revived from December 2005 to January 2006 by Tokyo's Parco Theater. A performance of the revival was broadcast live on Wowow in 2006. For each performance, the main storyline remained the same, but the dialogue was rewritten. On May 6, 2020, Yoshimasa Kondo organized a free live reading of the play over Zoom and streamed via YouTube Live during the COVID-19 pandemic. This iteration starred many of the cast members of the 1992 Tokyo Sunshine Boys production.

== Release ==
The Gentle 12 was theatrically released by Argo Pictures on December 14, 1991, in Japan. The film was later released to DVD by Geneon Entertainment on October 25, 2000.

== Awards and nominations ==
1991 Agency for Cultural Affairs Outstanding Film Award

- Won

65th Kinema Junpo Best Ten Awards

- Won: Best Screenplay (Kōki Mitani)
- Best Ten List: 7th place

46th Mainichi Film Awards

- Won: Best Screenplay (Kōki Mitani, Tokyo Sunshine Boys)

14th Yokohama Film Festival

- Won: Best New Actor (Etsushi Toyokawa, shared with Yoshiyuki Ōmori)
