= Aiko Morishita =

Japanese actress (born 1958)

- 森下 愛子
- Born: 8 April 1958 (age 67); Musashino, Tokyo
- Other names: Kayo Yoshida (real name)
- Citizenship: Japan
- Years active: 1977–88; 1999–present
- Agent: Takeda Kikaku
- Television: Uchi no Ko ni Kagitte...; Ikebukuro West Gate Park; Boku no Ikiru Michi; Jun to Ai
- Spouse: Takuro Yoshida (m. 1986)

Aiko Morishita (森下 愛子, Morishita Aiko; born 8 April 1958) is a Japanese actress who has appeared in a number of feature films and television series. Her real name is Kayo Yoshida (吉田 佳代, Yoshida Kayo). Her husband is singer-songwriter Takuro Yoshida.

== Biography ==
She was born in Musashino, Tokyo. She graduated from Kojimachi Gakuen Girls' High School. She was scouted during her high school studies and debuted as a model. She debuted as an actress in 1977 in Jigoku no Tenshi: Akai Bakuon (Toei Company). She gained attention for her role in Third Base (1978).

She married Takuro Yoshida in December 1986. She suspended her career from 1988. Since returning to the Tokyo Broadcasting System Television drama Utsukushī Hito in 1999, her career has been even more active than before her break. She is regularly a cast member in Kankurō Kudō's works.

== Filmography ==
=== TV dramas ===
Dates	Title	Role	Network	Notes	Ref.
1977	Kāsan Dōdō				
1977	Ningyōsashichi Torimonochō			Episode 30 "The Heart Bitten by a Viper Snake"	
1977	Itsuka Mita Aozora		NHK		
1978	Akai Gekitotsu	Yuri Otani	TBS		
1978	Midori no Yume o Mimasenka?		EX		
1979	Ashita no Keiji	Ranko Maeda		Episode 60 "There was a Secret Child in Suzuki Deka!!"	
1979	Doyō Wide Gekijō Seicho Matsumoto no Kikanakatta Basho		EX		
1979	Taiyō ni Hoero!	Yoko	NTV	Episode 339 "Explosion"	
1979	Special Investigation Front Line	Yuka Mihara	EX	Episode 105 "Goodbye, Detective Takasugi!"	
1979	Hakuchū no Shikaku	Takako Fujii	MBS		
1979	Kakekomi Biru 7-gōshitsu	Yoko		Episode 4	
1980	Ānomugitōge				
1980	Minatomachi Junjō Cinema	Kayo	TBS		
1981	Detective Alliance		CX		
1981	Omoeba Tōku e Kita monda	Kanako Shimizu			
1981	Pro Hunter		NTV	Episode 6	
1981	Jidaigeki Special Adauchi Senshu	Oshizuka	CX		
1981	Warera Dōbutsu Kazoku		EX		
10 April 1982	The Suspence Hi no ataru Basho	Ruiko	TBS		
1982	Chotto Kamisama		TBS		
12 February 1983	The Suspence Kiri no Shinwa		TBS		
7 May 1983	The Suspence Benri Yahira-san Jiken-bo Dairi Shussan no Himitsu		TBS		
1983	On'yado Kawasemi	Okono	NHK	2nd Series Episode 16 "Cherry Blossoms in Winter"	
1983	Ato wa Neru dake		EX		
1983	Kayō Suspense Gekijō Jūkon		NTV		
1983	Wakarete Ītomo	Yumiko Nomura	CX		
1983	Doyō Wide Gekijō Muta Criminal Case File		EX		
1984–87	Uchi no Ko ni Kagitte...	Ryoko Ishibashi	TBS		
7 August 1984	The Suspence Futari no Koibito		TBS		
1985	Haru no Hatō		NHK		
18 August 1985	Hadaka no Taishō	Hatago's daughter	KTV	Episode 16 "Conclusion of Kiyoshi's Rice Ball"	
1986	Kinyōbi ni wa Hana o Katte				
21 April 1986	Shizuko Natsuki Suspense: Isho Futatsu		KTV		
1987	Mama wa Idol!		TBS		
1987	Drama Onna no Shuki Otto o Kōkan shita Tsuma-tachi no Taiken		TX		
1988	Yappari Neko ga Suki		CX	Only the first episode appeared and got down from sickness	
1999	Utsukushī Hito		TBS		
2000	Ikebukuro West Gate Park	Ritsuko Majima	TBS		
2000	Getsuyō Drama Special Sleep in the Rain	Eriko Nakahara	TBS		
2001	17-Nen-me no Papa e	Machiko Tsujisawa (Jinko's mother)	TBS		
2001	Heaven Cannot Wait	Akiko Okinoshima			
2001	Omae no Yukichi ga Nai teiru		EX		
2002	Kisarazu Cat's Eye	Rose	TBS		
2002	Sora Kara Furu Ichioku no Hoshi	Kotoko Sugita	CX		
2002	Tokyo Niwatsuki Ikkodate	Harumi Tamarisan	NTV		
2002	Akechi Kogoro vs. Phantom of the Twentieth Face	Fujin Aikawa	TBS		
Jul 2002	Vitamin H	Kazumi Takagi	NHK		
2003	Boku no Ikiru Michi		CX		
2003	Manhattan Love Story		TBS		
2004	Water Boys 2		CX		
Aug 2004	Ichiban Taisetsuna Date Tokyo no Sora Shanhai no Yume	Yuriko Hagiwara	TBS		
2005	Tiger & Dragon	Koharu Mizukoshi	TBS		
2005	Gekidan Engisha. Dai 14-kai Kōen-saku: Lonely My Room		CX		
6 May 2005	Yagate Kuru Hi no tame ni	Reiko Akizuki	CX		
13 May 2006	Machiben	Yaeko Fukagawa	NHK	Episode 5	
2007	Hatachi no Koibito		TBS		
2008	Ryūsei no Kizuna	Kimiko Tobiti	TBS		
Apr–May 2009	Harukanaru Kizuna		NHK		
Oct–Nov 2009	Gyōretsu 48-jikan	Satoko Takarafuku	NHK G		
Jul–Sep 2010	Unubore Keiji	Reiko Mama	TBS		
Oct 2012 – Mar 2013	Jun to Ai	Harumi Kano	NHK		
2014	Gomen ne Seishun!	Miyuki Hara	TBS		
Oct 2017 –	Kangoku no Ohime-sama	Akemi Adachi	TBS		

=== Films ===
Year	Title	Role	Distributor	Notes
1977	Jigoku no Tenshi: Akai Bakuon	Mao	Toei Company	
1978	Third Base	Shinbun-bu	Art Theatre Guild	
1978	Kawa Jan Hankō-zoku	Mayo	Toei Company	
1978	Double Clutch	Kazuko Hiraiwa	Shochiku	
1979	Jūdai Keiko no Baai	Keiko Takano	Toei Company	First starring work
1979	Oretachi no Kōkyōgaku	Yumiko Sakuma	Shochiku	
1979	Motto shinayaka ni, motto shitataka ni	Ayako Taguchi	Nikkatsu	
1979	Toyadoshi, Umi e	Yoshi Arishima	Nikkatsu	
1979	Shokei Yūgi	Keiko Tayama	Toei Company	
1979	Track Yarō Furusato Tokkyū-bin	Fumiko Nishio	Toei Company	
1979	Oretachi ni Haka wa nai	Cycling woman	Toei Company	
1979	Sōchō no Kubi	Nanako Shunkai	Toei Company	
1980	Kage no Gundan: Hattori Hanzō	Senri (Ori)	Toei Company	
1981	Toritate no Kagayaki	Keiko	Toei Company	
1981	Mashō no Natsu: Yotsuya Kaidan yori	Ume	Shochiku	
1983	Jinsei Gekijō	Teruyo Ogishi	Toei Company	
1985	Fire Festival	Mother		
1986	Boku no Onna ni Te o Dasuna	Taeko Yonekura	Toei Company	
1988	Bakayaro! I'm Plenty Mad Episode 1: What is Wrong with Eating?	Chieko Atsugi	Shochiku	
2003	Kisarazu Cat's Eye: Nihon Series	Rose	Asmik Ace	
2005	Yaji and Kita: The Midnight Pilgrims			
2006	Kisarazu Cat's Eye: World Series	Rose	Asmik Ace	
2006	Simmsons	Yoshiko Ito		
2006	Nada Sōsō		Toho	
2007	Argentine Hag	Sanae Takimoto		
2008	Tsukiji Uogashi Sandaime	Junko	Shochiku	
2012	Space Brothers	Mother of the Namba family	Toho	

=== Stage ===
Dates	Title	Role	Location
28–31 Dec 1979	Mr.Slim Sōshūhen–Headlight	Aiko	Parco Theater
	Snow Country	Yoko	Geijutsuza

=== TV programmes ===
Dates	Title	Network
	Oshaberi Jinbutsu-den	NHK G
	Gekidan Engisha: Lonely My Room	CX
	Takechan no Omowazu Waratteshimaimashita	CX
15 December 2000 – 10 February 2012	Waratte Iitomo!	CX
Oct 2001 – Mar 2002	Japan Walker	NTV
13 October 2001 – 31 August 2002	TV Oja Manbō	NTV
1 February 2002	Mentre G	CX
16 August 2002	Sanma no Manma	CX
30 October 2003	Shinya no Hoshi: Kisarazu Cat's Eye	TBS
29 February 2004	Oshare Kankei	NTV
18 April 2004	Domoto Brothers Special! In Hawaii Part 2	CX
18 July 2004	Domoto Brothers	CX
6 February 2006	Tetsuko no Heya	EX
26 November 2012	Studio Park kara Konnichiwa	NHK
11 August 2016	Tetsuko no Heya	EX

=== Advertisements ===
Year	Product
1977	Son Road Udedokei
2008	Suntory Maruyama
