= Deka Kurokawa Suzuki =

- Based on: Deka Kurokawa Suzuki by Michio Takita
- Written by: Ellie Omiya
- Directed by: Ryuichi Honda
- Starring: Itsuji Itao; Seiichi Tanabe; Kei Tanaka; Mayu Tsuruta
- Country of origin: Japan
- Original language: Japanese

Original release
- Network: NTV
- Release: 5 January 2012

Deka Kurokawa Suzuki (デカ 黒川鈴木) is a Japanese television drama series.

== Cast ==
- Itsuji Itao as Suzuki Kurokawa
- Seiichi Tanabe as Shiraishi
- Kei Tanaka as Akagi
- Mayu Tsuruta as Shizue Kurokawa
