= Rei Okamoto =

Japanese model and actress (born 1991)

- 岡本 玲
- Born: June 18, 1991 (age 34); Wakayama, Japan
- Occupation: Actress
- Years active: 2003–present
- Agent: Ever Green Entertainment
- Website: okamotorei.com

Rei Okamoto (岡本玲, Okamoto Rei; born June 18, 1991, in Wakayama, Wakayama) is a Japanese model and actress who stars as Mia Amagishi in Threads of Destiny. She also appears in the NHK Asadora Jun and Ai (2012).

== Filmography ==
=== Film ===
Year	Title	Role	Notes	Ref.
2008	Threads of Destiny	Mia Yamagishi		
2023	Tea Friends	Mana Sasaki	Lead role	
2025	Traveling Alone		Lead role	
2026	Yakushima's Illusion	Yumi		

=== Television ===
Year	Title	Role	Notes	Ref.
2010	Job-Hopper Buys A House	Akari Hoshino		
2012	Detective Conan: Kyoto Shinsengumi Murder Case	Kazuha Toyama	Television film	
2012	Jun and Ai	Makoto Machida	Asadora	
2017–18	Laugh It Up!	Kaede Sugita	Asadora	
