= Akiko (actress) =

Japanese actress and singer

- 亜希子
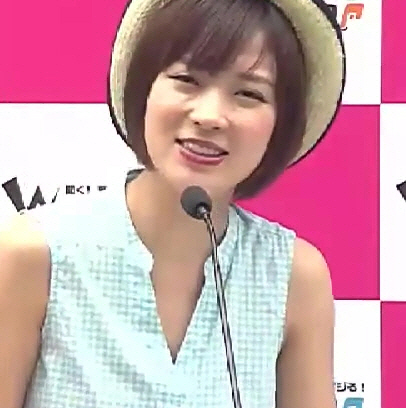
- Born: Akiko Oki; 18 August 1989 (age 36); Chiba Prefecture, Japan
- Occupations: Actress; tarento
- Years active: 2005–present
- Known for: Utatama; Regatta: Kimi toita Eien; Teppan Shōjo Akane!!; Tomehane! Suzuri Kōkō Shodōbu
- Height: 1.68 m (5 ft 6 in)
- Relatives: Natsuko (Natsuko Oki, twin sister)

Akiko (亜希子; born 18 August 1989, in Chiba Prefecture, Japan) is a Japanese actress, singer, and former member of the female idol group SDN48. Her real name is Akiko Oki (大木 亜紀子, Ōki Akiko). Her hobby is reading. Her skills are writing, playing basketball, long-distance running, and cooking.

Akiko's twin sister is Natsuko.

== Discography ==
=== Singles ===
Title	Notes
"Sado e Wataru"	As part of Under Girls B
"Awajishima no Tamanegi"	As part of Under Girls B
"Onedari Champagne"	As part of Under Girls A
"Gamjatang Bojō"	As part of Under Girls A
"Kurikuri"	As part of Under Girls A

=== Theatre performances ===
Title	Songs
SDN48 1st Stage 2-kisei: Yūwaku no Garter	"Black boy" and "I'm sure"

== Publications ==
=== Videos ===
Year	Title
2007	Akiko
2007	Natsuko-Akiko
2011	Akiko: Kyōshuku Body

== Filmography ==
=== TV drama ===
Year	Title	Role	Network	Notes
2005	Nobuta wo Produce	Nami Saeki	NTV	
2006	Regatta: Kimi toita Eien	Aki Shinozuka	TV Asahi	
2006	Teppan Shōjo Akane!!	Mikan Katsura	TBS	
2007	Mirai Yuenchi	Maki	TV Asahi	
2008	Karuta Komachi	Sakyo Ichijo	Fuji TV	
2008	Koiuta Drama SP	Yuri Takamine	TBS	Episode 1
2010	Tomehane! Suzuri Kōkō Shodōbu	Hiromi Hino	NHK-G	
2010	Uta Sera	Rumi	TBS	
2014	Tenchu: Yami no Shioki Hito	Etsuko	Fuji TV	

=== Variety series ===
Year	Title	Network	Notes
2005	Toshiaki Karasawa Presents: Kioku no Chikara II	NTV	Debut
2007	Quiz! Hexagon II	Fuji TV	
2007	Mirai Kyōju Sawamura	Fuji TV	
2007	BS Brunch	BS-TBS	
2008	Goddotan	TV Tokyo	
	Nekketsu! Hobby Stadium	Kids Station, TVK	
2010	Suppon no Onna-tachi	TV Asahi	
2011	Rumi Matsushima no Monday Night 20!	A! To odoroku Hōsōkyoku	

=== Films ===
Year	Title	Role
2008	Utatama	Kaede Matsumoto
2008	Hitorimake	Mio Satoda

=== Stage ===
Year	Title	Notes
2012	Gekka no Orchestra	Co-starred with Natsuko
2012	Kono Ai yo Kanaunara Ureshī yo	
2013	Dai 1-kai Dig/esT Produce Kōen: O Ninpu-tachi no Lullaby	

=== Advertisements ===
Title	Ref.
Toto Ltd.	
NTT Higashinihon Denpo	
Æon Group	
Panasonic	
Godiva	

=== Others ===
Title	Notes
100 Scene no Koi	Mobile drama
Inu Kaisha DS	As the voice of Sano-san

== Bibliography ==
=== Photobooks ===
Year	Title	Notes
2006	futari	Co-starred with Natsuko
