= Leave My Girl Alone =

- Film poster
- Directed by: Shun Nakahara
- Screenplay by: Shun Nakahara; Hiroshi Saito
- Based on: Boku no Onna ni Te wo Dasuna by Jotaro Kuwahara
- Produced by: Mitsuru Kurosawa; Ryoji Ito; Shigeyuki Endō; Tatsuro Shigaki; Ikuo Suo; Yasuhiro Hasegawa
- Starring: Kyoko Koizumi; Ryo Ishibashi; Aiko Morishita; Teppei Yamada; Kaneko Iwasaki
- Cinematography: Koichi Suzuki
- Edited by: Isao Tomita
- Music by: Eiji Kawamura
- Production companies: Burning Production; Wings Japan; Toei Company
- Distributed by: Toei Company
- Release date: December 13, 1986 (Japan)
- Running time: 95 minutes
- Country: Japan
- Language: Japanese
- Box office: ¥950 million

Leave My Girl Alone (Japanese: ボクの女に手を出すな, Hepburn: Boku no Onna ni Te wo Dasuna; lit. Don't Touch My Woman) is a 1986 Japanese thriller film directed by Shun Nakahara and co-written by Nakahara with Hiroshi Saito, based on a novel of the same name by Jotaro Kuwahara. It tells the story of a financially desperate young woman who takes a job tutoring a rich kid, only to find herself entangled in a kidnapping plot. The film stars Kyoko Koizumi in the lead role, in addition to Ryo Ishibashi, Aiko Morishita, Teppei Yamada and Kaneko Iwasaki. Eiji Kawamura composed the film's score, while its theme song, "Embraced by a Dead Tree" (Kogarashi ni Dakarete), was performed by Koizumi. Leave My Girl Alone was theatrically released by Toei Company on December 13, 1986, in Japan, where it was a financial success.

== Plot ==
Hitomi Kuroda, a former orphan who lives in an apartment in Roppongi, is a lonely girl at the end of her rope. As a former child delinquent, she has made many mistakes in her life, and now works at a supermarket. But one day, she gets fired due to a problem with a customer. In addition, she is on the verge of being kicked out of her apartment due to unpaid rent. Hitomi decides to steal alcohol from her former employer in order to drown her sorrows. She gets caught. After being chased by the police, she is saved by Kazuya Kashima, a friendly young lawyer passing by. Then, through Kashima's introduction, she becomes a tutor for Susumu Yonekura of the wealthy Yonekura family. Susumu has recently lost a parent. He is a spoiled and selfish child, but he slowly begins to connect with Hitomi over their shared experience with grief. Hitomi also meets Taeko, Susumu's half-sister.

One day, Hitomi bumps into Michiko, a woman she knew from her job at the supermarket, on a country road. Michiko is accompanied by her boyfriend, Yusuke, as well as a man named Tohru. Hitomi visits the place where they are staying. Yusuke tells Hitomi that he and Tohru have come to kidnap Susumu and hold him for ransom. He says Michiko does not know about their plan and invites Hitomi to join them. Their boss is a creepy man named Isao Shiraki. However, Hitomi rejects their offer, choosing instead to escape with Susumu in tow. The next morning, Hitomi sees Yusuke and Tohru's charred corpses on the side of the road.

After evading Shiraki's relentless pursuit, Hitomi returns to Tokyo and visits Michiko's parents' house. She contacts Taeko, and the next day, she goes out with Michiko, who promises to take her to the Meiji Memorial Picture Gallery. However, Shiraki shows up and attacks them. They escape. Afterwards, Michiko tells Hitomi that Taeko seems suspicious to her. Michiko and Hitomi part ways.

Hitomi and Susumu visit Kashima. She tells him about their situation. Kashima tells her to go to Mutsushima island, where the Yonekura family's villa is located. He says he will wait for her there. Soon a man named Michio Tsuyama is also following Hitomi. Just before boarding the ship to the island, Shiraki appears, but Hitomi throws him into the sea. Their ship leaves without them, so Hitomi and Susumu steal a civilian vessel and head for Mutsushima.

The next morning, Hitomi finds a yacht anchored near the island. On board she finds Taeko. Taeko reveals that she was behind the kidnapping plot. She had hired Shiraki to kidnap and kill Susumu so that she could inherit the Yonekura family's ¥5 billion fortune. Taeko then tries to kill Hitomi. Hitomi accidentally kills her in the ensuing struggle. When Hitomi finally makes it to the island, Kashima is waiting for her. They hug each other and promise to stick together from now on. However, a badly injured Shiraki appears and fights Kashima. After a fierce struggle, Kashima is stabbed, while Shiraki is shot and killed by Tsuyama from a nearby vessel. It is revealed that Tsuyama was hired by the family to protect Susumu. They are unable to save Kashima, who dies on the island. Hitomi leaves with Susumu and Tsuyama, dazed and heartbroken.

== Cast ==
- Kyoko Koizumi as Hitomi Kuroda
- Ryo Ishibashi as Kazuya Kashima
- Aiko Morishita as Taeko Yonekura
- Teppei Yamada as Susumu Yonekura
- Kaneko Iwasaki as Kiyo Mizutani
- Joe Shishido as Bar owner
- Jiro Kawarazaki as Isao Shiraki, killer
- Mika Kaneko as Michiko Honjo
- Noriko Sengoku as Landlord
- Tatsuo Yamada as Yusuke Aida
- Junji Takada as Hotel guest
- Kōen Okumura as Eisaku Mizutani, Kiyo's husband
- Masaaki Daimon as Supermarket manager
- Toki Shiozawa as Supermarket customer
- Masahiko Tanimura as Conductor
- Isao Natsuyagi as Michio Tsuyama
- Shigeru Muroi as Hostess of hotel
- Teruyoshi Uchimura as Fisherman
- Kiyotaka Nanbara as Fisherman

== Background ==
The novel was first published by Shueisha in October 1986. Director Nakahara came up with the idea for the story, as he had wanted to work with and create a role for lead actress Koizumi specifically. He asked Jotaro Kuwahara to turn his idea into a novel, which Nakahara then adapted into a screenplay.

== Production ==
Since the production of Be-Bop High School (1985), producer Yasuhiro Hasegawa had been planning to make a film with Kyoko Koizumi as the protagonist. Leave My Girl Alone was Koizumi's third feature film role. Due to the number of action scenes in the script, the studio insured Koizumi for ¥100 million.

Nakahara envisioned Koizumi's character as an Audrey Hepburn type; in writing the character, he was specifically inspired by Hepburn's performance in Charade. He also chose to take Koizumi's opinions of the story into account, and hired screenwriter Hiroshi Saito to make changes on set when required.

Much of the film was shot on location, including in Tokyo (specifically the district of Roppongi and the Meguro ward), Matsumoto, Lake Shirakaba, the Meiji Memorial Picture Gallery, Shimoda, and Shinjuku Station.

== Soundtrack ==
The film's soundtrack was composed by Eiji Kawamura. It was released on both CD and vinyl formats by Victor Entertainment in 1987.

Koizumi performed the film's theme song, "Embraced by a Dead Tree" (Kogarashi ni Dakarete). Its lyrics and music were composed by Toshihiko Takamizawa, and it was arranged by Akira Inoue. The song was released as a single, reaching number 3 on the Oricon Singles Chart. The single also hit number 1 on The Best Ten, as well as number 11 on its year-end rankings for 1987. In addition, the song hit number 1 on Nippon Television's Uta no Toten program, and was also the program's number 7 top song overall for 1987. Its B-side was "Blueage Dream", which was also included on the soundtrack, and also composed by Takamizawa and arranged by Inoue.

All music is composed by Eiji Kawamura unless otherwise noted:

No.	Title	Writer(s)	Vocals	Length
1.	"Beginning〜Main Theme"	Eiji Kawamura
2.	"Money Walker"	Kawamura
3.	"Premonitory"	Kawamura
4.	"Feeling Love"	Kawamura
5.	"Dangerous Runaway"	Kawamura
6.	"Strange Story"	Kawamura
7.	"Blueage Dream"	Toshihiko Takamizawa	Kyoko Koizumi
8.	"Hard Times"	Kawamura
9.	"Hitomi"	Kawamura
10.	"Hip Dancer"	Kawamura
11.	"Little Friend"	Kawamura
12.	"Love Theme"	Kawamura
13.	"Leave My Girl Alone (ぼくの女に手を出すな)"	Kawamura
14.	"Embraced by a Dead Tree (木枯しに抱かれて)"	Takamizawa	Koizumi

== Release ==
Leave My Girl Alone was theatrically released by Toei Company on December 13, 1986, in Japan. It was released as a double feature with The Gentlemen’s Alliance (Shinshi dōmei) and grossed ¥950 million at the box office. The film was later released to DVD by Toei Video on June 8, 2016.

== Awards and nominations ==
61st Kinema Junpo Best Ten Awards

- Won: Best Newcomer Actor (Ryo Ishibashi, also won for A Homansu)
