= No Continue Kid: Bokura no Game Shi =

- Created by: Dai Satō
- Written by: Dai Satō, Hidenori Ishiyama, Makoto Ueda, Hayashi Mori, Shirō Maeda, Masayoshi Tominaga, Tetsuya Mariko
- Composer: Yoshitoku Sunahara
- Country of origin: Japan
- Original language: Japanese
- No. of episodes: 12

Production
- Producers: Kimitaka Goka, Sayaka Iezumi, Shunsuke Suzuki, Toshikazu Nishigaya, Masayuki Akieda
- Production location: Set in Toshima-ku, Tokyo
- Running time: 31 minutes
- Production company: TV Tokyo

Original release
- Network: TX Network
- Release: October 4 – December 20, 2013

No Continue Kid: Bokura no Game Shi (ノーコン・キッド 〜ぼくらのゲーム史〜, Nō Kon · Kiddo ~ Bokura no Gēmu Shi ~; lit. "No Continue Kid: Ours Game History") is a Japanese television drama ran on TV Tokyo from 4 October 2013 to December 20. The series bases on Japanese video game industry since 1983 to 2013, featured three high school students' growing up.

Several famous games appeared in the show, such as Xevious, Pac-Man and Dragon Quest II.

== Cast ==
- Reiji Watanabe (渡辺 礼治) - Kei Tanaka
- Fumiyoshi Takano (高野 文美) - Haru
- Akinobu Kido (木戸 明信) - Hamano Kenta
- Masashi Watanabe (渡辺 雅史) - Jirō Satō
