= Gal Circle =

- Also known as: ギャルサー
- Country of origin: Japan
- Original language: Japanese
- No. of episodes: 11

Original release
- Network: Nippon Television
- Release: 15 April – 24 June 2006

Gal Circle (ギャルサー, Gyaru Sā) is a Japanese television drama series that was aired on Nippon Television. The series started on 15 April 2006 and ended with 11 episodes on 24 June 2006. It was the first drama in which Naohito Fujiki played a lead role. It also starred Erika Toda and Aragaki Yui.

== Story ==
Geronimo III sends Shinosuke across the ocean to Shibuya, Tokyo, Japan, on a quest to find a girl named Imoko. Shinosuke stirs up commotion in the shopping district with his eccentric, misplaced cowboy attitude as he disrupts the town with his lasso. On his adventure, he meets the girls of Angel Heart.

== Characters ==
- Naohito Fujiki as Shinosuke Kitajima (北島進之助, Kitajima Shinosuke), cowboy, 33 years old

=== Members of Angel Heart ===
- Erika Toda as Saki (サキ), member of Angel Heart's white group, 16 years old
- Emi Suzuki as Remi (レミ), leader of Angel Heart, 18 years old
- Mari Yaguchi as Yurika (ユリカ), member of Angel Heart's black group, 23 years old, posing as 16
- Yui Aragaki as Nagisa (ナギサ) leader of Angel Heart's black group, 18 years old
- Mayuko Iwasa as Rika (リカ), candidate to be the next leader of Angel Heart, 17 years old
- Aimi Satsukawa as Shizuka (シズカ), member of Angel Heart's white group, 16 years old
- Natsuko as Sumire (スミレ), member of Angel Heart's white group, 16 years old

=== Characters in America ===
- Arata Furuta as Geronimo III, a perplexing Native American, 40 years old
- Nanami Hinata (Nana Yamauchi) as Momo (モモ), Geronimo's daughter, 8 years old
- Kenji Anan as George, Geronimo's friend, 43 years old

== Reception ==
Gal Circle was a modest ratings success, earning an average 12.94% rating over the series.
