= Kei Tanaka =

Japanese actor (born 1984)

- 田中圭
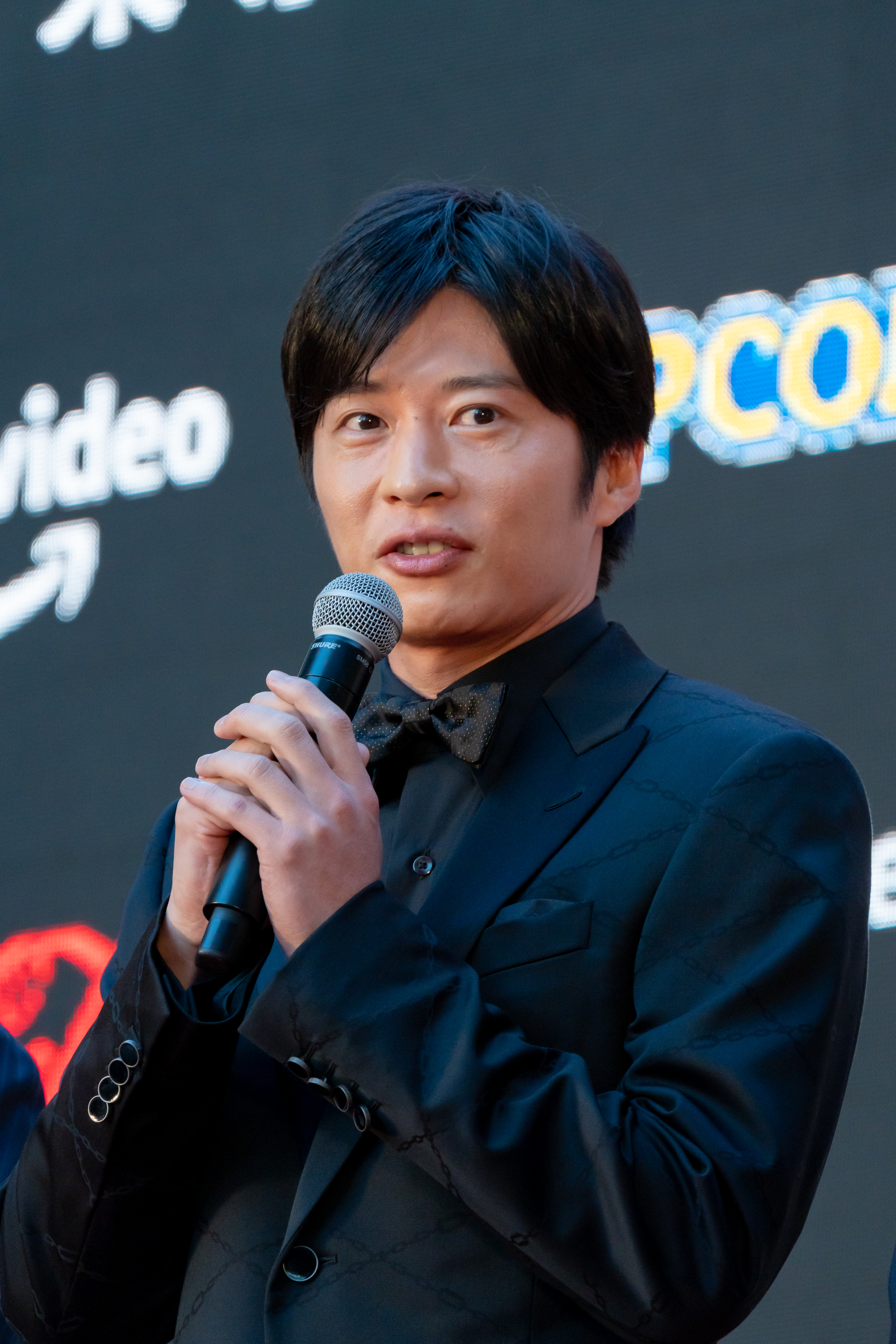
- Tanaka in 2023
- Born: July 10, 1984 (age 42); Tokyo, Japan
- Occupation: Actor
- Years active: 2000–present
- Spouse: Sakura (m. 2011)
- Children: 2

Kei Tanaka (田中圭, Tanaka Kei; born 10 July 1984) is a Japanese actor.

== Personal life ==
On August 31, 2011, Tanaka married former actress Sakura, his co-star in the television drama Massugu na Otoko. Their agencies also announced that the two were expecting their first child, as Sakura was already five months pregnant at that time. His wife gave birth to a daughter the following year on February 6, 2012. Their second daughter was born on August 3, 2016.

== Filmography ==
=== Film ===
Year	Title	Role	Notes	Ref.
2002	Suicide Club	High school student		
2004	Be with You	Mio's university friend		
2007	Hōtai Club	Shinichi 'Gimo' Yanagimoto		
2011	Runway Beat	Satoru Inuda		
2012	Afro Tanaka	Hajime Okamoto		
2012	.hack//The Movie	Tomohiko Okano (voice)		
2013	Library Wars	Mikihisa Komaki		
2015	Library Wars: The Last Mission	Mikihisa Komaki		
2017	Manhunt	Kitagawa	Chinese film	
2018	The Many Faces of Ito	Shin'ya Tamura		
2018	Stolen Identity	Makoto Tomita		
2019	Marriage Hunting Beauty	Yatabe		
2019	Hit Me Anyone One More Time	Heitarō Ōzeki		
2019	Ossan's Love: Love or Dead	Sōichi Haruta	Lead role	
2020	Mellow	Seiichi Natsume	Lead role	
2020	Stolen Identity 2	Makoto Tomita	Special appearance	
2021	The Cinderella Addiction	Daigo Izumisawa		
2021	Jump!! The Heroes Behind the Gold	Jinya Nishikata	Lead role	
2021	Kakegurui – Compulsive Gambler Part 2		Cameo appearance	
2021	First Gentleman	Hiyori Sōma	Lead role	
2021	And So the Baton Is Passed	Sōsuke Morimiya		
2021	Your Turn to Kill: The Movie	Shōta Tezuka	Lead role	
2022	To Be Killed by a High School Girl	Haruto Higashiyama	Lead role	
2022	Whisper of the Heart	Sonomura		
2022	Haw	Tamio Akanishi	Lead role	
2022	Phases of the Moon	Ryunosuke Masaki		
2023	G-Men	Kōichi Yagami		
2024	Who's Gone	Arakawa		
2024	Doctor-X: The Movie	Hikaru Morimoto		
2024	Stolen Identity: Final Hacking Game	Makoto Tomita	Special appearance	
2024	The Hotel of My Dream	Endo		
2025	Hey, Dazai: The Movie	Kensaku Komuro	Lead role	
2026	Kingdom 5: The Clash of Souls	Wu Feng Ming		

=== Television series ===
Year	Title	Role	Notes	Ref.
2002	Gokusen	Ono		
2003	Water Boys			
2004	Socrates in Love			
2005	Water Boys 2005 Natsu			
2005	Tokyo Friends	Wataru Iwatsuki	DVD released	
2006	Journey Under the Midnight Sun			
2007	Hana Yori Dango Returns			
2008	Maō	Hitoshi Kasai		
2011	Diplomat Kosaku Kuroda	Mamoru Saionji		
2011	Sunshine	Haruki Sudō	Asadora	
2011	The Reason I Can't Find My Love	Yu Hasegawa		
2012	Deka Kurokawa Suzuki	Tadashi Akagi		
2012–2021	Doctor-X: Surgeon Michiko Daimon	Hikaru Morimoto	Season 1, 5 and 7	
2013	No Continue Kid: Bokura no Game Shi	Reiji Watanabe	Lead role	
2014	Gunshi Kanbei	Ishida Mitsunari	Taiga drama	
2015	I'm Home	Tsuyoshi Honjō		
2016	Good Morning Call	Takuya Uehara		
2017	Tokyo Tarareba Musume	Yoshio Marui		
2018	Miss Sherlock	Toshio Yoneyama		
2018	Double Fantasy	Ryosuke Iwai	Miniseries	
2018–2024	Ossan's Love	Sōichi Haruta	Lead role; 3 seasons	
2019	Your Turn to Kill	Shōta Tezuka	Lead role	
2020	Panda Judges the World	Tetsuya Morishima		
2020	Discord	Yūsuke Kawakami	Lead role; Television film	
2020	Unsung Cinderella	Shōgo Seno		
2020	How to Eliminate My Teacher	Tsuneo Yoshizawa	Lead role	
2021	Helical Labyrinth	Jin Jinbo	Lead role	
2022	Umeko: The Face of Female Education	Itō Hirobumi	Television film	
2023	Black Postman	Rikiya Soejima	Lead role	
2025	Hey, Dazai	Kensaku Komuro	Lead role; Television film	

=== Japanese dub ===
- Godzilla: King of the Monsters (2019) - Dr. Mark Russell (Kyle Chandler)
- Godzilla vs. Kong (2021) - Dr. Mark Russell (Kyle Chandler)
- The Lost City (2022) - Alan Caprison / Dash McMahon (Channing Tatum)

== Awards and nominations ==
Year	Award	Category	Work(s)	Result	Ref.
2018	11th Tokyo Drama Awards	Best Actor	Ossan's Love	Won	
2019	22nd Nikkan Sports Drama Grand Prix	Best Actor	Ossan's Love	Won	
2019	43rd Elan d'or Awards	Newcomer of the Year	Himself	Won	
2020	23rd Nikkan Sports Drama Grand Prix	Best Actor	Ossan's Love (S2) and Your Turn to Kill	Won	
