= Nana Eikura =

Japanese actress

- 榮倉 奈々
- Nana Eikura promoting April Bride in Tokyo - 2009, with co-star Eita
- Born: February 12, 1988 (age 38); Izumi, Kagoshima, Japan
- Other name: Nana Kaku (after married)
- Years active: 2002–present
- Spouse: Kento Kaku (m. 2016)
- Children: 2

Nana Eikura (榮倉 奈々, Eikura Nana; born February 12, 1988) is a Japanese actress, model, and occasional radio show host affiliated with Ken-On Group.

== Biography ==
She was born in Izumi, Kagoshima, and raised in Sagamihara, Kanagawa. While a junior high student, she was scouted in front of the 109 department store in Shibuya, Tokyo. During her middle-teenage years, Nana modeled in several fashion magazines, mainly in Seventeen.

During the 2000s, Eikura was featured in Seventeen along with Emi Suzuki and several others. Eikura later began appearing in various advertisements and collections in the mid-2000s and has appeared in many TV advertisements. She began acting in the mid-2000s. Since around 2007, Eikura has intentionally gained nearly 12 kg (27 pounds).

Eikura has been called "Samoan Eikura" because of her facial resemblance to Mark Hunt and Samoa Joe. In 2006, Eikura interviewed Mark Hunt on the Tokai TV show The MMA Kingdom, where Hunt said "I've never seen such a skinny Samoan".

Eikura has appeared in advertisements for non-fashion/non-cosmetic items, including Coca-Cola, the Japanese Red Cross, Japan Post Service, Johnson & Johnson's Japanese branch, KDDI's au, Lion, and Nintendo's videogame Rhythm Heaven. She has also appeared in non-fashion magazines as a model, including the NASCAR-orientated magazine Racing On. She has appeared in eight TV commercials with Masami Nagasawa. Nagasawa has frequently described Eikura as an "incredibly" nice person.

Eikura can play shamisen, has a diploma, and can sing in fluent Ryukyu language, which she learned from her modeling colleagues who were from Okinawa. She once covered Rimi Natsukawa's song "Nada Sōsō" on a Kinki Kids' TV show in 2007.

She appeared in Shinji Aoyama's 2011 film Tokyo Park. She starred as Sakamaki Yuki in the winter 2012 drama serial Saikō no Jinsei no Owarikata: Ending Planner.

On 7 August 2016, Eikura registered her marriage with fellow actor, Kento Kaku. They first met when they costarred in the 2014 TBS drama, N no Tame ni. They started dating in summer 2015. She was confirmed to be five months pregnant in March 2017 and then gave birth on June 12, 2017 and has one more child.

Starring in 2016, "99.9 ~ Keiji Senmon Bengoshi (2016-) " topped the ratings of Japanese television drama, The final episode reached 21.0 percent, the only drama this year to exceed 20 percent.

In 2020 Eikura was nominated for Best Supporting Actress at a major film award, the 45th Hochi Film Award for her performance in Threads: Our Tapestry of Love.

== Filmography ==
=== Films ===
| Title | Year | Role | Notes | Ref |
|---|---|---|---|---|
| Space Police | 2004 | | | |
| Boku wa Imouto ni Koi o Suru | 2007 | Iku Yūki | | |
| The Graduates | 2007 | | | |
| Shibuyaku Maruyamacho | 2007 | | Lead role | |
| Awa dance | 2007 | | Lead role | |
| April Bride | 2009 | Chie Nagashima | Lead role | |
| Antoki no Inochi | 2011 | | Lead role | |
| Tokyo Park | 2011 | | | |
| The Floating Castle | 2012 | Kaihime | | |
| Daijōbu 3-kumi | 2013 | | | |
| Library Wars | 2013 | Iku Kasahara | Lead role | |
| My Hawaiian Discovery | 2014 | | Lead role | |
| Miracle Debikuro-kun no Koi to Mahō | 2014 | | | |
| Her Granddaughter | 2015 | | Lead role | |
| Library Wars: The Last Mission | 2015 | Iku Kasahara | Lead role | |
| 64: Part I | 2016 | Mikumo | | |
| 64: Part II | 2016 | Mikumo | | |
| When I Get Home, My Wife Always Pretends to be Dead | 2018 | Chie Kagami | Lead role | |
| Threads: Our Tapestry of Love | 2020 | Kaori Kirino | | |
| 99.9 Criminal Lawyer: The Movie | 2021 | Ayano Tachibana | | |

=== Television ===
| Title | Year | Role | Notes | Ref |
|---|---|---|---|---|
| Jiiji: Mago to Ita Natsu | 2004 | | | |
| Jiiji II: Mago to Ita Natsu | 2005 | | | |
| Kiken na Aneki | 2005 | | | |
| Dandori: Dance Drill | 2006 | | Lead role | |
| Operation Love | 2007 | Eri Oku | | |
| Maison Ikkoku | 2007 | | | |
| Hitomi | 2008 | | Lead role; Asadora | |
| Mei-chan no Shitsuji | 2009 | Mei Shinonome | Lead role | |
| Shiawase no Okurimono SP | 2009 | | Lead role; television film | |
| Nakanai to Kimeta Hi | 2010 | | Lead role | |
| Wagaya no Rekishi | 2010 | | Miniseries | |
| Good Life - Arigatō Papa, Sayonara | 2011 | | | |
| Mitsu no Aji: A Taste of Honey | 2011 | Naoko Morimoto | Lead role | |
| Saikō no Jinsei no Owarikata: Ending Planner | 2012 | | | |
| Kuro no Onna Kyōshi | 2012 | | Lead role | |
| Kakusho: Keishicho Sousa 3-ka | 2013 | | | |
| Hajimari no Uta SP | 2013 | | | |
| Testimony of N | 2014 | Nozomi Sugishita | Lead role | |
| Library Wars: Book of Memories | 2015 | | | |
| Isan Souzoku | 2015 | | | |
| 99.9 Criminal Lawyer | 2016 | | | |
| Tokyo Tarareba Musume | 2017 | | | |
| Bokura wa Kiseki de Dekite Iru | 2018 | Ikumi Mizumoto | | |
| Ship of Theseus | 2020 | Kazuko Tamura | | |
| Modern Love Tokyo | 2022 | Kana Satō | Lead role; episode 2 | |

=== Dubbing ===
- Coraline (Coraline)

== Recognitions ==
- 33rd Japan Academy Film Prize (2010): Newcomer of the Year for April Bride
- 34th Elan d'or Awards (2010): Newcomer of the Year for April Bride, Mei-chan no Shitsuji
