= Kazuyuki Aijima =

Japanese actor

- Born: November 30, 1961 (age 64); Saitama, Japan
- Occupation: Actor
- Years active: 1983–present

Kazuyuki Aijima (相島 一之, Aijima Kazuyuki; born November 30, 1961) is a Japanese stage and film actor, and one of the original Tokyo Sunshine Boys, a theatrical troupe that lasted from 1983 to about 1994. He is currently seen in television dramas and onstage in Japan.

== Biography ==
Aijima Kazuyuki was born November 30, 1961, in Saitama, Japan. He joined Mitani Koki's Tokyo Sunshine Boys theatrical troupe in 1983, which grew in popularity until its movie debut with the parody of Reginald Rose's 12 Angry Men, a comedy called 12 Gentle Japanese released in 1991. Aijima was one of the few Tokyo Sunshine Boys to pass the movie auditions to star in their own film - in fact he stole the lead. Most of them never made it into the film.

Aijima is specially trained in Kendo and can play a number of musical instruments as well.

== Filmography ==
=== Film ===
- The Gentle 12 (1991)
- Suite Dreams (2006)
- A Ghost of a Chance (2011)
- Library Wars: The Last Mission (2015)
- Three Nobunagas (2019), Sena Nobuteru
- Shrieking in the Rain (2021)
- In Her Room (2023)

=== Television ===
- Furuhata Ninzaburō (1996)
- Shomuni (1998–2003)
- Kasouken no Onna (1999)
- Hero (2001)
- Shinsengumi! (2004), Niimi Nishiki
- Fugo Keiji (2005)
- Taira no Kiyomori (2012), Fujiwara no Kanezane
- Burning Flower (2015)
- The Hippocratic Oath (2016)
- Naotora: The Lady Warlord (2017)
- Yell (2020)
- The Grand Family (2021)
- The 13 Lords of the Shogun (2022), Unkei
- Unbound (2025), Matsudaira Yasuyoshi

=== Theatre ===
- My Fair Lady - Colonel Hugh Pickering (2018)
