= Sayuri Iwata =

Japanese actress and singer

Sayuri Iwata 岩田さゆり
- Born: July 21, 1990 (age 36); Izunokuni, Shizuoka, Japan
- Genres: J-pop; pop
- Occupations: Singer; actress; model
- Years active: 2005–2016
- Label: GIZA Studio
- Website: sayuri-iwata.com/main.html

Sayuri Iwata (岩田さゆり, Iwata Sayuri; born July 21, 1990) is a Japanese actress and former singer.

Iwata started her career as a model for Love Berry magazine before branching out into singing when she was 15. Her first single, "Sora Tobu Ano Shiroi Yuki No You Ni", was released in February 2005 and peaked at number 40 on the Oricon Singles Chart. Later that year, in November, Iwata released another single, "Thank You for Everything", which was used as an ending theme for the Detective Conan anime adaptation.

Iwata starred in the TBS drama Kinpachi-sensei the same year she started modeling for Love Berry, playing the role of Yayoi Iijima. Later, in 2008, Iwata had a part in the movie Utatama. In 2011, she made an appearance in the film Lupin no Kiganjo, opposite Koichi Yamadera as Lupin. Later in her acting career, in April 2015, Iwata starred in the Gaim Gaiden: Kamen Rider Zangetsu film as Touka Akatsuki. A few months later, she appeared in the TV drama adaptation of Gin no Spoon as Tamaki Suzui.

== Discography ==
=== Singles ===
- [2005.02.23] Sora tobu ano Shiroi Yuki no you ni (空飛ぶあの白い雲のように)
- [2005.03.30] Sorairo no Neko (空色の猫)
- [2005.07.27] Fukigen ni Naru Watashi (不機嫌になる私)
- [2005.11.09] "Thank You for Everything"

=== Albums ===
- [2005.05.25] Kaze to Sora to (風と空と)
- [2005.12.07] Thank You For...
- [2008.06.04] Best +

=== DVDs ===
- [2006.05.03] First Scene ~Sayuri Iwata 1st Visual Collection~

== Book ==
=== Photobook ===
- [2005.11.10] best friend

== Filmography ==
=== TV shows ===
- Kisshoh Tennyo as Sayoko Kanou
- Jigoku Shoujo as Ai Enma
- Shuukan Akagawa Jirou (週刊 赤川次郎) as Hikari Ishikawa
- General Rouge no Gaisen as Kanae Mayama (Fuji TV, 2010) (ep5)

=== Movies ===
- Prince of Tennis (2006) as Shioin Higaki
- Utatama (うた魂♪) (2008)
- Kamen Rider Gaim Gaiden (2015) as Touka Akatsuki/Kamen Rider Idunn
