= Chiho Watanabe =

Japanese screenwriter (born 1972)

- 渡辺 千穂
- Born: 18 October 1972 (age 53); Tokyo, Japan
- Other names: Chiho Hatori (羽鳥 千穂, Hatori Chiho)
- Occupation: Screenwriter
- Notable work: Sayonara Midori-chan; Akai Ito; Rain Tree no Kuni; Shokubutsu Zukan: Unmei no Koi, Hiroimashita
- Television: Nakanai to Kimeta Hi; Namae o nakushita Megami; Saki; First Class; Beppinsan

Chiho Watanabe (渡辺 千穂, Watanabe Chiho; born 18 October 1972, in Tokyo) is a Japanese screenwriter.

Watanabe is a member of the Scenario Writers Association. She is married to freelance announcer Shinichi Hatori.

== Biography ==
She was born in Tokyo.

In 2000, she worked for a company as an office lady, originally thought that she wanted to write something, because she liked her books originally, as a result of the screenplay version of the television drama Fuzoroi no Ringo-tachi taken from a bookstore she am was willing for her path of screenwriting. In the era of underwriting worked on plotting screenplay and stayed in the eyes of producers of television stations, she made her debut as a screenwriter at the 2002 TV drama Tentai Kansoku (Kansai Telecasting Corporation).

Since then, she has worked numerous comedies and romantic dramas around television dramas. In 2010 one of her works Nakanai to Kimeta Hi (Fuji Television) drew attention by hiding the back and front of the human with the theme of female workplace bullying without hiding, attracting attention, and in 2014 First Class (Fuji Television) drew a female rating "Mounting" and called a topic. She was highly appraised as writing a plurality of characters as a single story and received a reputation that she "felt refined elegance" and received a screenplay of the Asadora Beppinsan (Note: Her husband Shinichi Hatori is in charge of moderator of morning drama general TV main broadcast counter programme Morning Show.) in the latter half of 2016.

In her private life, she was married on 18 August 2014, after acquiring a dinner hosted by President TakeOff in August 2012, after a dating period of about two years with a freelance announcer Shinichi Hatori (Note: Hatori admitted to associate with Watanabe at the beginning of TV Asahi's broadcast of Jōhō Mansai Live Show: Morning Bird! on 23 April 2013.) belonging to the same office since around November the same year. On 13 January 2016 Asadora Beppinsan made a preliminary announcement at the production presentation, giving birth to a girl who becomes her first child at the end of the same month.

== Works ==
=== TV dramas ===
Run	Title	Network	Notes
Jul–Sep 2002	Serchin for my Polestar	KTV	
Jul–Sep 2003	14-Kagetsu: Tsuma ga Kodomo ni Kaette iku	YTV	
2004	Kētai Keiji: Zenigata Rui	BS-TBS	
2004–05	Kētai Keiji: Zenigata Rei	BS-TBS	
Apr 2004	Tengoku e no Ōen Uta: Cheers: Cheerleading ni kaketa Seishun	NTV	
Nov 2004	Shinsatsuhakkō Kinen Drama 'Ichiyō Higuchi Monogatari'	TBS	
2005	Tokyo Michika	CX	Episode 1
2005	Koisuru Nichiyōbi	BS-TBS	Second Series; Episodes 1 and 2 "Owaranai Uta"; Episodes 3 and 4 "Subarashī Hibi"; Episode 7 "Boku no Mori"; Episode 8 "Boku no Heya kara"; Episode 10 "Baby Baby"; Episode 13 "Aenai Yoru o Dakishimete"; Episode 14 "Shijōsaidai no Sakusen"; Episodes 17 to 19 "Koi no Uta"; Episode 23 "Rōdoku Geki: Tokyo Tower"
2005	Bungaku no Uta Koisuru Nichiyōbi	BS-TBS	Episodes 3 and 4 "Semmono o Nusumu Onna"; Episode 11 "Kanojo no Kokuhaku"; Episode 13 "Rōgishō"
2005	Girl's Box	BS-TBS	Episode 3 "Christmas no Yukue"; Episode 4 "Imou to"
Oct–Dec 2005	Kiken na Aneki	CX	
2006	Kētai Keiji: Zenigata Kaminari	BS-TBS	
2006	Mō hitotsu no Sugar and Spice	CX	
2007–08	Kētai Keiji: Zenigata Umi	BS-TBS	
2007	Koisuru Nichiyōbi	BS-TBS	Third Series; Episode 1 and 2 "Ayako no Koi"; Episode 6 "Shitsuren no Kizu no Iyashi-kata"; Episodes 8 and 9 "Hajimete no Koi"; Episodes 12 and 13 "Sotsugyō-Haru no Uso"; Episode 14 "Tsukusu Onna no Koi"; Episode 15 "Ashita no Egao"; Episode 21 "Chikakute Tōi Koi"; Episode 22 "Ohikkoshi"; Episode 23 "Onī no Koi"; Episode 25 "Sanshimai"
2007	Ima o Ikiru Sobo	BS-TBS	
Jul–Aug 2007	Papa to Musume no 7-kakan	TBS	
Jan–Mar 2008	Daisuki!!	TBS	
Mar 2008	Ross:Time:Life	CX	Episode 8 "Buchō-hen"
May 2008	Tokyo Girl: Erena Mizusawa	BS-TBS	Episodes 1 and 2 "Kimi no Uta"
Aug 2008	Tokyo Girl: Anri Okamoto	BS-TBS	Episodes 4 and 5 "Journey"
Dec 2008 – Feb 2009	Akai Ito	CX	
2009	Kētai Keiji: Zenigata Inochi	BS-TBS	
Mar 2009	Tokyo Girl: Yu Seol-ah	BS-TBS	Episode 4 "Seihokusei Shōjo"
Jan 2010	Seicho Matsumoto Drama Special: Sankyō no Shō	CX	
Jan–Mar 2010	Nakanai to Kimeta Hi	CX	
Jun–Aug 2010	Tokyo Little Love	CX	Second Season
Jul 2010	Zettai Nakanai to Kimeta Hi: Kinkyū Special	CX	
Apr–Jun 2011	Namae o nakushita Megami	CX	
14 May 2011	Yonimo Kimyōna Monogatari: 21 seiki: 21-nen-me no Tokubetsu-hen	CX	"Avatar"
9 Sep 2011	Miyuki Miyabe Special Majutsu wa sasayaku	CX	
Jan–Mar 2012	Saiko no Jinsei	TBS	
1 Jul 2012	NTT DoCoMo: 20-Shūnen Special Drama Yume no Tobira Tokubetsu-hen 20-Nen-go no Kimi e	TBS	
Jul–Sep 2012	Ikimodekinai Natsu	CX	
Jan–Mar 2013	Saki	KTV	
20 Jan 2013	Premium Drama Aruku, Aruku, Aruku: Shikoku Henro Michi	NHK-BS	
6 Feb 2013 –	Kamisama no Itazura	BS-TBS	
27 Sep 2013	Kinyō Road Show! Jinsei ga tokimeku Katazuke no Mahō	NTV	
25 Oct 2013	Nigakute, Amai: Kibō no Cha	NHK G Kyushu Okinawa	
Apr–Jun 2014	First Class	CX	
Apr–May 2014	Kōhī-ya no Hitobito	NHK BS Premium	
Nov–Dec 2014	Akka	Wowow	
Nov 2014 – Feb 2015	Watashitachi ga Propose sa renai no ni wa, 101 no Riyū ga atteda na	LaLa TV	
Apr–Jun 2015	Tatakau! Shoten Girl	KTV	
24 Jun 2015	Tokubetsu Drama Kikaku: Eien no boku-ra sea side blue	NTV	
Nov–Dec 2015	5-Ri no Junko	Wowow	
Oct 2016 – Apr 2017	Asadora Beppinsan	NHK	
Jul 2017	Uchi no Otto wa Shigoto ga dekinai	NTV	

=== Films ===
Date	Title
27 Aug 2005	Sayonara Midori-chan
8 Oct 2005	Ko no Mune ippai no Ai o
9 Jun 2007	Koisuru Nichiyōbi: Watashi. Koi shita
20 Dec 2008	Threads of Destiny
21 Nov 2015	Rain Tree no Kuni
4 Jun 2016	Evergreen Love

=== Internet dramas ===
Run	Title	Website
Mar–May 2006	Tokyo Love Collection	GyaO
6 Oct – 22 Dec 2009	bump.y	TBS
Feb–Mar 2011	Saigo no Kataomoi	BS-TBS, Banana Republic

=== Internet ===
Run	Title	Website
15 Oct 2012 –	Lesson of the Evil –Joshō–	BeeTV

=== Stage ===
Year	Title	Location
2009	bump.y Dai 1-kai Kōen Mappiruma no Elevator!	Aoyama Amphitheater
2010	Ghost Friend –Yūrei–	Space 107
2010	Ama Danshi –Amadan–	Actor's Theater
2011	Sotsugyō –Love Letter–	Shibuya Duo
