= Tomehane! Suzuri Kōkō Shodōbu =

Japanese manga series

- First tankōbon volume cover

とめはねっ! 鈴里高校書道部
- Genre: Comedy
- Manga
- Written by: Katsutoshi Kawai
- Published by: Shogakukan
- Magazine: Weekly Young Sunday (2006–2008); Weekly Big Comic Spirits (2008–2015)
- Original run: December 14, 2006 – March 16, 2015
- Volumes: 14
- Television drama
- Directed by: Masahiro Mori; Akira Hibino; Hideo Mizumura
- Written by: Shizuka Ōki
- Music by: Shirō Sagisu
- Original network: NHK
- Original run: January 7, 2010 – February 11, 2010
- Episodes: 6
- icon

Tomehane! Suzuri Kōkō Shodōbu (とめはねっ! 鈴里高校書道部; 'Stops and Hooks! Suzuri High's Calligraphy Club' (Note: In the writing of Chinese characters, tome, hane, and harai (sweeps) are different stroke endings.)) is a Japanese manga series about Japanese calligraphy, written and illustrated by Katsutoshi Kawai. It was serialized in Shogakukan's seinen manga magazine Weekly Young Sunday from December 2006 to July 2008, when the magazine ceased its publication, and it was then transferred to Weekly Big Comic Spirits where it ran from September 2008 to March 2015; its chapters were collected in 14 tankōbon volumes. A six-episode television drama adaptation was broadcast on NHK from January to February 2010.

== Characters ==
Yuki Mochizuki (望月 結希, Mochizuki Yuki)
Portrayed by: Aki Asakura
Yukari Oe (大江 縁, Ōe Yukari)
Portrayed by: Sosuke Ikematsu
Yuko Mochizuki (望月 結子, Mochizuki Yuko)
Portrayed by: Riona Hazuki

== Media ==
=== Manga ===
Written and illustrated by Katsutoshi Kawai, Tomehane! Suzuri Kōkō Shodōbu was serialized in Shogakukan's seinen manga magazine Weekly Young Sunday from December 14, 2006, (Note: It started in the magazine's seventh issue of 2007 (cover date January 11), released on December 14, 2006.) to July 14, 2008, when the magazine ceased its publication. The series was then transferred to Weekly Big Comic Spirits, where it ran from September 6, 2008, to March 16, 2015. Shogakukan collected its chapters in fourteen tankōbon volumes, released from May 2, 2007, to May 29, 2015.

==== Volumes ====
No.	Japanese release date	Japanese ISBN
1	May 2, 2007	978-4-09-151197-3
2	October 5, 2007	978-4-09-151239-0
3	April 4, 2008	978-4-09-151317-5
4	November 28, 2008	978-4-09-151404-2
5	June 30, 2009	978-4-09-151429-5
6	January 7, 2010	978-4-09-151480-6
7	September 30, 2010	978-4-09-151498-1
8	May 30, 2011	978-4-09-151525-4
9	December 27, 2011	978-4-09-151533-9
10	August 30, 2012	978-4-09-151540-7
11	May 30, 2013	978-4-09-151548-3
12	December 27, 2013	978-4-09-151556-8
13	December 26, 2014	978-4-09-151566-7
14	May 29, 2015	978-4-09-151569-8

=== Drama ===
In June 2009, it was announced that the series would receive television drama adaptation. It was broadcast for six episodes on NHK from January 7 to February 11, 2010.

== Reception ==
Tomehane! Suzuri Kōkō Shodōbu was nominated for the first two Manga Taisho in 2008 and 2009. It was one of the Jury Recommended Works at the 14th Japan Media Arts Festival in 2010.
