= Freeter, Ie wo Kau =

- Genre: Drama
- Starring: Kazunari Ninomiya; Naoto Takenaka; Atsuko Asano; Haruka Igawa
- Opening theme: "Kimi tte" by Kana Nishino
- Ending theme: "Hatenai Sora" by Arashi
- Country of origin: Japan
- Original language: Japanese
- No. of episodes: 10

Production
- Running time: 54 minutes

Original release
- Network: Fuji Television; Kyodo Television
- Release: October 19 – December 21, 2010

Freeter, Ie wo Kau (フリーター、家を買う。) is a Japanese television drama series that aired on Fuji Television and on Kyodo Television in 2010. It is based on a novel of same name by Hiro Arikawa. It centers around a university student graduate who quit his job only after 3 months and started living as a hikikomori. When his mother fell ill, he determined to start working part time and take care of his mother as he saves money.

== Cast ==
- Kazunari Ninomiya
- Naoto Takenaka
- Atsuko Asano
- Haruka Igawa

== Reception ==
It won the Series Drama Grand Prix at the 2011 Tokyo Drama Awards and Kazunari Ninomiya won the Award for Best Actor.
