= Hiro Arikawa =

Japanese light novelist (born 1972)

- Born: 9 June 1972 (age 54); Kochi City, Kochi Prefecture, Japan
- Occupation: Light novelist

Hiro Arikawa (有川 浩, Arikawa Hiro) is a Japanese light novelist from Kōchi, Japan.

== Biography ==
Arikawa was born on 9 June 1972, in Kochi City, Kochi Prefecture, Japan. She won the tenth annual Dengeki Novel Prize for new writers for Shio no Machi: Wish on My Precious in 2003, and the book was published the following year. It was praised for its love story between a heroine and hero divided by age and social status, and for its depiction of military structures. Arikawa noted that her works were largely influenced by Gamera films and The Great Escape.

Although she is a light novelist, her books from her second work onwards have been published as hardbacks alongside more literary works, with Arikawa receiving special treatment in this respect from her publisher, MediaWorks. Shio no Machi was also later published in hardback. Her 2006 light novel Toshokan Sensō (The Library War) was named as Hon no Zasshi's number one for entertainment for the first half of 2006, and came fifth in the Honya Taishō for that year, competing against ordinary novels.

She has written about the Japan Self-Defense Forces (JSDF); her first three novels concerning its three branches are known as the Jieitai Sanbusaku (The SDF Trilogy). She also wrote about the fictional Library Forces in the Toshokan Sensō series. Raintree no Kuni, which first appeared as a book within a book in Toshokan Nairan was later published by Arikawa as a spin-off with another publisher. It was adapted into a film titled World of Delight released on 21 November 2015.

Her novel Shokubutsu Zukan was adapted into a film titled Shokubutsu Zukan: Unmei no Koi, Hiroimashita (Evergreen Love), released on 4 June 2016. Likewise, two other of her novels, i.e. Freeter, Ie wo Kau and Hankyū Densha were adapted respectively in film or TV series in 2010 and 2011.

Tabineko Ripouto, a work which was serialized Weekly Bunshun between the years of 2011 and 2012, was compiled into a novel in 2012. In it, the protagonist is a cat called Nana (Japanese for seven), which enters the life of cat lover Satoru, who is still mourning his first cat Hachi (Japanese for eight). Tabineko Ripouto rapidly gained critical acclaim and several literary award nominations. It was translated by Philip Gabriel and published in English as The Travelling Cat Chronicles in 2017. The novel was then adapted into a film in 2018.

== Influence ==
In a 2011 essay written by video game designer Hideo Kojima, he reviewed Arikawa's novel Hankyu Densha while relating the story to his personal experiences riding the Hankyu Railway as a child. The essay was later published in Kojima's autobiographical book The Creative Gene, released on 12 October 2021.

== Works ==
- The SDF Trilogy series
  - Shio no Machi: Wish on My Precious ISBN 978-4-8402-2601-1
  - Sora no Naka
  - Umi no Soko
- The Library War series
  - Toshokan Sensō (The Library War)
  - Toshokan Nairan (The Library Infighting)
  - Toshokan Kiki (The Library Crisis)
  - Toshokan Kakumei (The Library Revolution)
- World of Delight
- Sweet Blue Age
- Hankyū Densha (published in French in 2021 under the title Au prochain arrêt, i.e. At the next stop; published in English in 2025 under the title The Passengers on the Hankyu Line).
- Shokubutsu Zukan
- Freeter, Ie wo Kau
- Soratobu Kōhōshitsu
- Tabineko Ripouto (published in English under the title The Travelling Cat Chronicles in 2017)
