= Cine Bazar =

Japanese film production company

Cine Bazar Company, Ltd.
- Native name: 株式会社シネバザール
- Romanized name: Kabushiki gaisha Shine Bazāru
- Industry: Motion pictures
- Founded: 1994; Est. November 1996
- Founder: Kazutoshi Wadakura
- Headquarters: 205 Toho Studios Production Center, 1-4-1 Seijo, Setagaya, Tokyo, Japan
- Key people: Kazutoshi Wadakura (president & CEO); Morio Amagi (representative); Yōko Honda (manager)
- Revenue: ▲¥4.0 billion (2009); ¥2.5 billion (2008); ¥1.65 billion (2007); ¥860 million (2006)
- Total equity: ¥30 million
- Number of employees: 10 (May 2007)
- Divisions: Cine Bazar Casting Department

Cine Bazar Co., Ltd. (株式会社シネバザール, Kabushiki gaisha Shine Bazāru) is a Japanese film and entertainment studio headquartered in Toho Studios, Seijo, Setagaya, Tokyo. It was founded in 1994 by film producer Kazutoshi Wadakura, who currently serves as its president and chief executive officer. The company is involved in films that depict Japan and is best known for co-producing the 2016 film Shin Godzilla and the 2022 film Shin Ultraman with Toho. It owns a casting division for its films called the Cine Bazar Casting Department, located in Sakuragaokachō, Shibuya, Tokyo.

== Works ==
=== Film ===
- Hiroshima (1995)
- Love & Pop (1998)
- Party 7 (2000)
- Calmi Cuori Appassionati (2001)
- Nin x Nin: Ninja Hattori-kun, the Movie (2004)
- The Taste of Tea (2004)
- Otakus in Love (2004)
- Cutie Honey (2004)
- Lorelei: The Witch of the Pacific Ocean (2005)
- Spring Snow (2005)
- Shining Boy & Little Randy (2005)
- Sugar and Spice (2006)
- Bubble Fiction: Boom or Bust (2007)
- Hero (2007)
- Closed Diary (2007)
- Argentine Baba (2007)
- Hidden Fortress: The Last Princess (2008)
- The Magic Hour (2008)
- After School (2008)
- Paco and the Magical Book (2008)
- My Darling of the Mountains - Tokuichi in Love (2008)
- Nodame Cantabile: The Movie I (2009)
- 20th Century Boys 3: Redemption (2009)
- Amalfi: Rewards of the Goddess (2009)
- Nodame Cantabile: The Movie II (2010)
- Oba: The Last Samurai (2011)
- Andalucia: Revenge of the Goddess (2011)
- Rock: Wanko no Shima (2011)
- A Ghost of a Chance (2011)
- Pieta in the Toilet (2015)
- Shin Godzilla (2016)
- Bleach (2018)
- Evangelion: 3.0+1.0 Thrice Upon a Time (2021)
- Shin Ultraman (2022)
- Shin Kamen Rider (2023)
