= Taiyō no Uta =

Taiyō no Uta may refer to:

- "Taiyō no Uta" (song), 2006 Erika Sawajiri song
- Taiyō no Uta (TV series), 2006 TBS TV series
- Taiyō no Uta (film), 2006 film
