= Kazutoshi Wadakura =

Japanese film producer

- 和田倉 和利
- Born: 1959 (age 66–67); Nitta, Genkai, Saga, Japan
- Education: Meiji University
- Occupation: Film producer
- Years active: 1994-present
- Title: Founder, president and CEO of Cine Bazar

Kazutoshi Wadakura (和田倉 和利, Wadakura Kazutoshi; born 1959) is a Japanese film producer who is the founder, president, and chief executive officer of the Japanese production company Cine Bazar.

== Life and career ==
Born in 1959 in Nitta, Genkai, Saga, Japan. After graduating from Meiji University, Wadakura became a film producer and founded the production company Cine Bazar in 1994, which he currently serves as president and CEO.

Wadakura has produced several live-action films in his career, including: Hiroshima, Swallowtail Butterfly, Cat's Eye, Love/Juice, Party 7, Calmi Cuori Appassionati, The Taste of Tea, Saiyūki, Hero (2007), The Magic Hour, Suspect X, Amalfi: Rewards of the Goddess, Sideways, Andalucia: Revenge of the Goddess, A Ghost of a Chance, The Kiyosu Conference, Hero (2015), Persona Non Grata, Shin Godzilla, Bleach, Masquerade Hotel, Hit Me Anyone One More Time, Shin Ultraman, and Shin Kamen Rider. Along with various other film producers, he served as executive producer for the 2019 film Diner, as well as for several other films including Key of Life, Persona Non Grata, and A Gambler's Odyssey 2020. Wadakura also made a cameo as an elderly fisherman in The Fast and the Furious: Tokyo Drift, for which he served as the line producer for the Tokyo production crew.

== Filmography ==
=== Producer ===
- The Stairway to the Distant Past (1995)
- Hiroshima (1995) (Note: With Tracey Alexander, Katsumi Ono, and Tomoshiro Kaiyama.)
- Swallowtail Butterfly (1996) (Note: With Shinya Kawai, Osamu Kubota, and Hiroko Maeda.)
- The Breath (1996)
- Cat's Eye (1997) (Note: With Akitoshi Takuma, Hiroshi Shirai, and Shunsuke Koga.)
- Mabui (1999) (Note: With Kazufumi Asami.)
- Love/Juice (2000) (Note: With Chikako Nakabayashi and Tsuyoshi Sugino.)
- Party 7 (2000) (Note: With Hiroyuki Iizumi, Kazuto Takida, and Toshiyuki Koga.)
- Calmi Cuori Appassionati (2001) (Note: With Yuji Usui.)
- Current Lover (2002) (Note: With Tsuyoshi Takashiro.)
- The Taste of Tea (2004) (Note: With Kazuto Takida.)
- Nin x Nin: Ninja Hattori-kun, the Movie (2004) (Note: With Ryoichi Fukuyama, Toru Miyazawa, Madoka Takiyama, and Ko Wada.)
- Shining Boy & Little Randy (2005) (Note: With Hiroyoshi Koiwai.)
- Check It Out, Yo! (2006) (Note: With Toru Miyazawa and Madoka Takiyama.)
- Back to the Bubble Era! Time Machine Drum Style (2007)
- Argentine Baba (2007)
- Saiyūki (2007) [with Yoshihiro Suzuki and Yasushi Ogawa] (Note: With Toro Okamoto and Kazuto Takida.)
- Hero (2007) (Note: With Takashi Ishihara, Yoshimasa Genozono, Tadashi Makino, and Toru Miyazawa.)
- My Darling of the Mountains (2008) (Note: With Hiroyuki Taniguchi and Kaoru Matsuzaki.)
- The Magic Hour (2008) (Note: With Yumiko Shigeoka and Kuga Maeda.)
- Suspect X (2008) (Note: With Tadashi Makino.)
- I Want to Be a Shellfish (2008) (Note: With Nobuhiro Azuma.)
- Amalfi: Rewards of the Goddess (2009) (Note: With Yuji Usui.)
- Sideways (2009) (Note: With Toru Miyazawa.)
- Nodame Cantabile: The Movie I (2009) (Note: With Kuga Maeda.)
- Nodame Cantabile: The Movie II (2010) (Note: With Kuga Maeda)
- Andalucia: Revenge of the Goddess (2011) (Note: With Yuji Usui.)
- A Ghost of a Chance (2011) (Note: With Kuga Maeda and Ken Tsuchiya.)
- LOVE: Masao-kun ga Iku! (2012) (Note: With Kimitaka Goka, Fumitsugu Ikeda, and Satoshi Fukushima.)
- Orpheus' Lyre (2013) (Note: With Yasushi Yamazaki and Kenichi Nakayama.)
- Maruyama, the Middle Schooler (2013) [with Makiko Nagasaka and Makoto Okada]
- Ataru: the First Love & the Last Kill (2013) (Note: With Hiroki Ueda, Han Chol, Nobuhiro Azuma, and Masato Ohara.)
- The Apology King (2013) (Note: With Nobuyuki Iinuma and Satoshi Fukushima.)
- The Kiyosu Conference (2013) (Note: With Kuga Maeda.)
- Hero (2015) (Note: With Tsuneya Watanabe.)
- Galaxy Kaido (2015) (Note: With Kuga Maeda and Megumi Nishihara.)
- Persona Non Grata (2015) (Note: With Nobuyuki Iinuma.)
- Shin Godzilla (2016) (Note: With Yoshihiro Sato and Masaya Shibusawa.)
- The Anthem of the Heart (2017) (Note: With Shun Hidaka, Hiroyuki Shimizu, and Shunsuke Saito.)
- Bleach (2018)
- Masquerade Hotel (2019) (Note: With Juichi Uehara.)
- Hit Me Anyone One More Time (2019) (Note: With Kuga Maeda.)
- Way to Find the Best Life (2019)
- Caution, Hazardous Wife: The Movie (2021) (Note: With Nobuyuki Iinuma, Yoko Edami, and Tadahisa Sakamoto.)
- Masquerade Night (2021) (Note: With Hiroki Wakamatsu and Shun Hidaka.)
- Radiation House: The Movie (2022) (Note: With Kazutaka Obara, Daisuke Kusagaya, and Hiromasa Tamai.)
- Shin Ultraman (2022) (Note: With Hideaki Anno, Masaki Kawashima, Takehiko Aoki, and Tomoya Nishino.)
- Yudo (2023) (Note: With Hiroki Wakamatsu, Zushi Kensuke, Toshikatsu Yamaguchi, and Tatsuya Kato.)
- Shin Kamen Rider (2023) (Note: With Daiki Koide.)

=== Executive producer/production ===
- Key of Life (2012) (Note: With Akira Fujimoto.)
- Pieta in the Toilet (2015) (Note: With Toshihiro Takahashi, Hiroshi Iwamoto, Yoshiki Junji, Tetsu Okada, Akira Ogawa, and Hideaki Shimizu.)
- Persona Non Grata (2015) (Note: With Yoshio Nakayama, Yousuke Miyake, Youzo Matsuda, Masakazu Kubo, Yoshiro Ido, Tomoko Shiro, Shinichiro Tsuzuki, Minami Ichikawa, Yoshikazu Kumagai, Koya Yabushita, Yutaka Ishikawa, and Masaki Otsuka.)
- A Gambler's Odyssey 2020 (2019) (Note: With Shinya Sano, Takaaki Ichihara, Tetsuhiko Maruhashi, Hidenobu Muramatsu, Tetsuya Sei, Goto Akinobu, and Yoshito Chubu.)
- Diner (2019) (Note: With Hitoshi Chiba, Yoshitaka Hori, Hiroyuki Ikeda, Hajime Inoue, Hiroyuki Ishigaki, Tsukasa Imamura, Tetsuya Sei, Kazuo Tani, Hiroshi Yamamoto, Eisaku Yoshikawa, and Yuusuke Tanaka.)
- Revolver Lily (2023)

=== Co-producer ===
- Millennium Traveler (1999) (Note: With Akemi Suyama.)
- Koi ni utaeba (2002)

=== Assistant producer ===
- Fuyajo (1998) (Note: With Tsutomu Sakurai and Chung Jinbang.)

=== Line producer ===
- The Fast and the Furious: Tokyo Drift (2006)

=== Actor ===
- Stereo Future SF episode 2002 (2001) as film producer
- The Fast and the Furious: Tokyo Drift (2006) as elderly fisherman
