= Tadashii Ōji no Tsukurikata =

2008 Japanese television series

- Kanji: 正しい王子のつくり方
- Genre: Comedy
- Directed by: Keiichi Kitagawa; Mikiko Yamashita; Hidenori Higure
- Starring: Kotaro Yanagi; Yurie Midori; Hiroki Aiba; Yukihiro Takiguchi; Kouhei Takeda; Renn Kiriyama; Hatsune Matsushima; Saki Kondo; Airi Toriyama; Sayaka Akimoto
- Opening theme: "Magic" by Meg
- Ending theme: "Brand New Me" by Rauh-Welt.
- Country of origin: Japan
- Original language: Japanese
- No. of seasons: 1
- No. of episodes: 12

Production
- Producer: Kengi Nakanishi

Original release
- Network: TV Tokyo
- Release: January 8 – March 25, 2008

Tadashii Ōji no Tsukurikata (正しい王子のつくり方; lit. "How to Make a Perfect Prince") is a Japanese television series that aired on TV Tokyo from January 8 to March 25, 2008.

== Plot ==
A previously all-girls high school begins accepting male students for the first time, but the girls are shocked to see that the boys are all rowdy, unruly, and unfashionable, far from their image of being a "perfect prince." Each girl decides to pair up with a boy and gives him a makeover, while learning more about his background and helping him resolve his personal problems.

== Cast ==
- Kotaro Yanagi as Tatsuya Shinozaki
- Yurie Midori as Nami Yuki
- Hiroki Aiba as Shurinosuke Hata
- Yukihiro Takiguchi as Fumizō Sōma
- Kouhei Takeda as Hayato Noda
- Renn Kiriyama as Kirin Yoshiyuki
- Hatsune Matsushima as Haruka Shinagawa
- Saki Kondo as Chiaki Shibata
- Airi Toriyama as Misaki Koshino
- Sayaka Akimoto as Natsuki Kiryū
- Mayuko Arisue as Fuyuko Sano
- Kouhei Kumai as Ken Oshikaga
- Tomokazu Yoshida as Mamoru Shibukawa
- Shingo Nakagawa as Gaku Hoshino
- Yuuka Rikuna as Tōko Kiriyama
- Aina Nishiaki as Hitomi Andō
- Sae Miyazawa as Koharu Kido
- Kaede as Naomi Suzuki
- Erika Sakai as Yuu Nishiyama
- Hijiri Sakurai as Shun Koseki
- Ryunosuke Kawai as Keita Yamasaki
- Takashi Nagayama as Takashi Nanbara
- Ken Maeda as Shigeo Senkawa
- Jyouji Kuraki as Kaname Mitani

== Episodes ==
No.	Title	Directed by	Written by	Original release date
1	"The Potential Princes Came!"; Transliteration: "Ōji-sama no Moto ga Yattekita!" (Japanese: 王子の素がやってきた!)	Unknown	Unknown	January 8, 2008
2	"The Start of the Prince Production!"; Transliteration: "Ōji-sama Purodyūsu Kaishi!" (Japanese: 王子プロデュース開始!)	Unknown	Unknown	January 15, 2008
3	"The Befouled Ribbon!"; Transliteration: "Yogosareta Ribon!" (Japanese: 汚されたリボン!)	Unknown	Unknown	January 22, 2008
4	"Thanks to the Baked Sweet Potato!"; Transliteration: "Yaki-imo ni Arigatō!" (Japanese: 焼きイモにありがとう!)	Unknown	Unknown	January 29, 2008
5	"The Things That Can Be Seen Behind the Glasses!"; Transliteration: "Megane no Oku ni Mieru Mono!" (Japanese: メガネの奥に見えるもの!)	Unknown	Unknown	February 5, 2008
6	"The Real Strength!"; Transliteration: "Honto no Tsuyosa!" (Japanese: ホントの強さ!)	Unknown	Unknown	February 12, 2008
7	"The Big Mail Plan!"; Transliteration: "Mēru Daisakusen!" (Japanese: メール大作戦!)	Unknown	Unknown	February 19, 2008
8	"Towards the Sunshine!"; Transliteration: "Hi no Ataru Basho e!" (Japanese: 陽のあたる場所へ!)	Unknown	Unknown	February 26, 2008
9	"The Gloves That Were Thrown Away"; Transliteration: "Suterareta Tebukuro!" (Japanese: 捨てられた手ぶくろ!)	Unknown	Unknown	March 4, 2008
10	"A Patch Over the Heart!"; Transliteration: "Kokoro no Appurike!" (Japanese: こころのアップリケ!)	Unknown	Unknown	March 11, 2008
11	"Makeover in My Style!"; Transliteration: "Watashi nari no Purodyūsu!" (Japanese: 私なりのプロデュース!)	Unknown	Unknown	March 18, 2008
12	"Hornworms and Cabbages!"; Transliteration: "Imomushi to Kyabetsu!" (Japanese: いもむしとキャベツ!)	Unknown	Unknown	March 25, 2008
