= Toriyama =

Toriyama (written: 鳥山, 通山) is a Japanese surname. Notable people with this surname include:

- Airi Toriyama (born 1989), Japanese actress and singer
- Akira Toriyama (1955–2024), Japanese manga artist and character designer
- Akira Toriyama (ophthalmologist) (1898–1994), Japanese ophthalmologist and photographer
- Motomu Toriyama, Japanese game director and scenario writer
- Toriyama Sekien (1712–1788), scholar and ukiyo-e artist
