= Masquerade Hotel =

2019 film

- Film poster
- Directed by: Masayuki Suzuki
- Screenplay by: Michitaka Okada
- Based on: Masquerade Hotel by Keigo Higashino
- Produced by: Juichi Uehara; Kazutoshi Wadakura
- Starring: Takuya Kimura; Masami Nagasawa
- Cinematography: Shoji Ehara
- Edited by: Takuya Taguchi
- Music by: Naoki Satō
- Production companies: Fuji Television; Shueisha; J Storm; Cine Bazar
- Distributed by: Toho
- Release date: 18 January 2019 (Japan)
- Running time: 133 minutes
- Country: Japan
- Language: Japanese

Masquerade Hotel (Japanese: マスカレード・ホテル, Hepburn: Masukarēdo Hoteru) is a 2019 Japanese crime film directed by Masayuki Suzuki. A sequel, Masquerade Night, was released on 17 September 2021.

== Plot ==
During an investigation of a serial killer in Tokyo, police are led to a hotel that may be where the next murder will take place. Detective Nitta Kosuke goes undercover and begins working at the front desk of the hotel. Yamagishi Naomi works at the front desk of the hotel. She is selected to train Kosuke for his front desk job. Kosuke is focused on catching the killer, but Naomi prioritizes the safety of the guests.

== Cast ==
- Takuya Kimura - Kosuke Nitta
- Masami Nagasawa - Naomi Yamagishi
- Fumiyo Kohinata - Nose
- Zen Kajihara - Motomiya
- Yūki Izumisawa
- Toshihide Tonesaku
- Ren Ishikawa
- Gaku Hamada
- Atsuko Maeda
- Takashi Sasano
- Masahiro Takashima
- Nanao
- Katsuhisa Namase
- Takashi Ukaji
- Manami Hashimoto
- Hiromasa Taguchi
- Ryo Katsuji
- Takako Matsu
- Sanma Akashiya (cameo)
- Shingo Tsurumi
- Eisuke Sasai
- Ryo Ishibashi
- Atsuro Watabe
