= Panel Quiz Attack 25 =

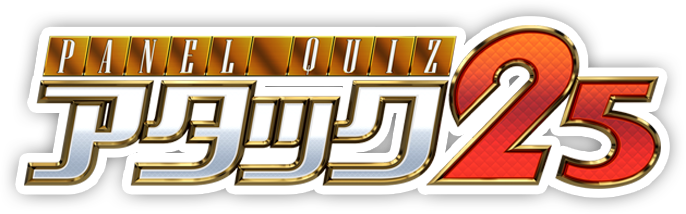
- Presented by: Shosuke Tanihara (2015-present)
- Starring: Akiko Kato (announcer,2015.4-2021.9.26)
- Theme music composer: Takeo Yamashita
- Country of origin: Japan

Production
- Running time: 30 minutes (with commercials)
- Production company: Asahi Television Broadcasting Corporation (Note: Previously credited as Asahi Broadcasting Corporation until 2018.)

Original release
- Network: ANN (ABC TV)
- Release: April 6, 1975 – September 26, 2021

Panel Quiz Attack 25 (パネルクイズ アタック25) is a game show airing once weekly on the Asahi Broadcasting Corporation network in Japan. The program first aired on April 6, 1975.

It was announced on July 7, 2021, that the show will be ending its 46-year run on September 26, 2021.

However, on January 18, 2022, a new one-hour format of the series was announced for the new cable network, BS Next. Titled "Panel Quiz Attack 25 NEXT," it is expected to premiere March 27, 2022. In addition, Shosuke Tanihara is expected to reprise his position as host.

== Master of Ceremony ==
- Kiyoshi Kodama (April 6, 1975 - April 10, 2011)
- Yasuyuki Urakawa (April 17, 2011 - March 29, 2015)
- Shosuke Tanihara (April 5, 2015 - September 26, 2021)

== Gameplay ==
Four contestants, each designated by a different color (red, green, white, and blue), compete. The game is played on a grid of twenty-five numbered boxes in a manner similar to the game Reversi.

The first question is a puzzle that is shown on the video screen; the first player to buzz in with the correct answer is awarded the center #13 box. After this, the contestants are introduced. From this point on, players are referred to by their designated color (in Japanese, red is "aka," green is "midori," white is "shiro," and blue is "ao").

From that point on, questions may take any of several forms, including general trivia, an audio question, or a video or picture question or puzzle. Players may buzz in at any time after the announcer begins reading the question. Buzzing in with the correct answer allows the player to capture one of the boxes on the game board. In addition, if by capturing a box, a player brackets one or more boxes held by opposing players, whether in the same row, column, or diagonal, the player steals those boxes.

A sample game in progress. With the board as shown on the left, if Red answers a question correctly, he can choose to capture box #5. This also gives him control of box #9, which is surrounded. The resulting board configuration is shown at right.

When capturing a box, players must:

- Make a capture that will steal a box from an opponent
- Failing that, make a capture that will set up a steal on another correct answer.
- Failing both of the above, capture a box that touches at least one other box held by any player.

Any time a contestant answers a question incorrectly, other than on the first question or any puzzle, that player is locked out from answering for two questions (originally three). If a question was answered incorrectly, play ends on that question, and a new question is asked; on a puzzle, play continues until someone answers correctly. (Players who are locked out must stand up from their chair and step away from their buzzers.)

=== Attack Chance ===
After twenty boxes are filled on the board, a bell rings, which signals the start of an "Attack Chance." The contestant who gives the next correct answer after the Attack Chance is announced captures a box as usual, then "attacks" any box that has already been captured (the player is allowed to attack his or her own box if so desired, however, he or she normally attacks an opponent's box). The box that is attacked is turned yellow, and can then be captured by any contestant as normal. Attacking a box is mandatory, so that if the contestant that won the Attack Chance is the only one with territory on the board, he or she must then attack his or her own box.

=== End of the Game ===
The game ends when the board is filled, or when time runs out (signaled by the Westminster Chimes). The contestant that holds the most boxes is declared the winner. If the game ends in a tie, the tied contestants play additional sudden-death questions until one of them gives a correct answer, thus winning the game. Each contestant wins an amount of money for each box they held at the end of the game. From 1975 to 1977, players received ¥2,000; over the years, the value increased to ¥4,000 per box, then ¥6,000, ¥8,000 and ¥10,000. However, if one contestant holds all 25 boxes (a perfect game), then their winnings are increased to ¥1,000,000. Along with the cash for each box, players also receive special prizes, along with a "performance fee" of ¥5,000, and the winning player is given a chance to win a vacation in the bonus game.

=== Bonus Round ===
The week's winner is shown a short film about an overseas travel destination; he or she is only able to view the film through those boxes that he or she has held at the end of the game. At the end of the film, the contestant has five seconds to identify the location. If successful, he or she wins a trip.

In more recent years, the object became identifying a famous person based on the film, and the trip on offer is announced beforehand (usually a Mediterranean cruise).

== Tournaments ==
Each year, a tournament is held in which some of the best-performing contestants are invited back for a chance to play again. The tournament is conducted in three stages.

- 1st stage: A 20-question written quiz. The top 10 highest scoring contestants advance to the next stage.
- 2nd stage: The top 10 contestants race to be one of the first four to answer three questions correctly. Any contestant who answers two questions incorrectly is eliminated. Contestants who give their three correct answers fill in the contestant positions from left to right (i.e., red, green, white, and blue).
- 3rd stage: A normal game of Panel Quiz Attack 25. The winner of this game is the year's champion.

== Video game ==
In addition to the TV show, there is also a video game version that is played on the PlayStation and PlayStation 2. It follows the same rules as in the TV program.

== International versions ==
Country	Local title	Channel	Presenter(s)	Premiere date
Vietnam	Đại Chiến Tứ Sắc Attack25	HTV	Quang Bảo	July 8, 2019
