= Kiyoshi Kodama =

Japanese actor

- 児玉 清
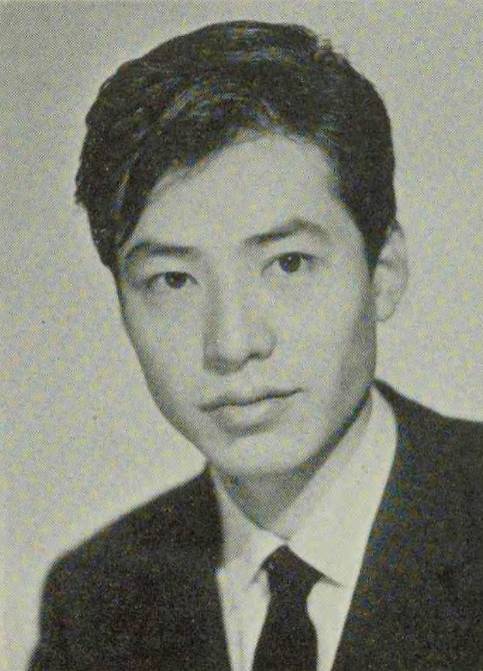
- Born: Kiyoshi Kodama (小玉 清); 1 January 1934; Kita, Tokyo, Japan
- Died: 16 May 2011 (aged 77); Chuo, Tokyo, Japan
- Other names: Kiyoshi Kitagawa (北川 清; real name)
- Occupations: TV personality, actor
- Years active: 1960–2011
- Notable work: The Bad Sleep Well; Eternity of Love
- Television: Arigato; Hana wa Hanayome; Panel Quiz Attack 25; Shiroi Kyotō; Hero
- Spouse: Machiko Kitagawa (1964–2011)
- Children: Daisuke Kitagawa
- Website: www.office-kodama.co.jp

Kiyoshi Kodama (児玉 清, Kodama Kiyoshi; real name: Kiyoshi Kitagawa (北川 清), born as Kiyoshi Kodama (小玉 清), 1 January 1934 – 16 May 2011) was a Japanese TV personality and actor. He hosted the Asahi Broadcasting Corporation quiz show Panel Quiz Attack 25 continuously for thirty-six years from its start in April 1975 until he was forced to step down due to poor health at the end of March 2011. His signature catchphrase on the show is "Attack Chance!"

An avid reader, Kodama hosted a TV book review show. He also published his own books. He was a voice actor for the voice of Robert Stephenson in the Japanese version of the 2004 animated movie Steamboy.

Kodama died of stomach cancer at a hospital in Chuo, Tokyo on 16 May 2011.

== Works ==
=== Film ===
- The Hidden Fortress (1958, Toho)
- The Bad Sleep Well| (1960, Toho)
- Salaryman Chushingura (サラリーマン忠臣蔵) (1960, Toho) - Okano
- Salaryman Chushingura 2 (続・サラリーマン忠臣蔵) (1960, Toho) - Okano
- Eternity of Love (別れて生きるときも) (1961, Toho) - Junkichi Ishiyama
- Kuroi gashû: Aru sonan (1961) - Hideo Iwase
- Chūshingura: Hana no Maki, Yuki no Maki (1962) - Han'nojo Sugaya
- Kokusai himitsu keisatsu: Shirei dai hachigo (1963) - Anzai
- Onna no rekishi (1963)
- Danchi: Nanatsu no taizai (1964) - Kôji Kawashima
- Taiheiyô kiseki no sakusen: Kisuka (1965) - Fukumoto
- Senjo ni nagareru uta (1965)
- Japan's Longest Day (1967, Toho) - Chamberlain Yasuhide Toda
- Battle of the Japan Sea (1969, Toho)
- Yoba (1976) - Ihara
- Steamboy (2004, Toho) - Robert Stephenson (voice)
- Hero (2007, Toho) - Toshimitsu Nabeshima

=== Drama ===
- NHK taiga drama series
  - Ōgon no Hibi (1978) - Tokugawa Ieyasu
  - Shishi no Jidai (1980) - Mizuhoya Usaburō
  - Sanga Moyu (1984) - Fumiya Shimaki
  - Takeda Shingen (1988) - Obu Toramasa
  - Taiheiki (1991) - Hōjō Sadaaki
  - Ryomaden (2010) - Sakamoto Hachihei
- Arigato (ありがとう; "Thank you") (1970–1974, TBS)
- Hana wa Hanayome (花は花よめ; "Flower to Flower Bride") (1971–1975, NTV)
- Shiroi Kyotō (1978, Fuji TV) - Hitoshi Sekiguchi
- Omoide Zukuri (1981, TBS)
- Musashibō Benkei (1986, NHK) - Togashi Yasuie
- Hero (2001, Fuji TV) - Toshimitsu Nabeshima
- Hero Special (HERO特別編) (2006, Fuji TV)
- Shikaotoko Aoniyoshi (鹿男あをによし) (2008, Fuji TV)
- Code Blue (2008–2010, Fuji TV) - Tadokoro Yoshiaki

=== Other TV programmes ===
- Toli Quiz Yes-No (東リクイズ・イエス・ノー) (1974–1975, Mainichi Broadcasting System, Inc.)
- Panel Quiz Attack 25 (パネルクイズ アタック25) (1975–2011, Asahi Broadcasting Corporation)
- Surprising Law Travel Agency (びっくり法律旅行社) (2007–2009, NHK General TV)
- Welcome to the words house (NTV)

=== Radio ===
- Telephone Counseling (テレフォン人生相談) (2003–2011, Nippon Broadcasting System, Inc. (LF))
- Selection of Shuhei Fujisawa's Works (朗読・藤沢周平傑作選) (2009–2011, LF)

== After his death ==
Asahi Broadcasting Corporation broadcast the special nationwide programme of "Attack 25" on the 22nd day of May 2011 to mourn his death. In the programme, two Asahi presenters Yasuyuki Urakawa and Akiko Kato told viewers all over Japan about Kiyoshi Kodama and the 36-year history of "Attack 25", showing famous scenes in "Attack 25" including his signature Attack Chance catchphrase, treasured pictures of him owned by TV Asahi, and comments of memories from special guests. Urakawa who substituted for Kodama since April 2011, hosted Attack 25 until March 2015, after which he was replaced by Shōsuke Tanihara.
