= A Ghost of a Chance =

- Film poster advertising this film in Japan
- Directed by: Kōki Mitani
- Written by: Kōki Mitani
- Produced by: Kuga Maeda; Ken Tsuchiya; Kazutoshi Wadakura
- Starring: Eri Fukatsu; Toshiyuki Nishida; Hiroshi Abe; Yūko Takeuchi; Tadanobu Asano; Kiichi Nakai
- Cinematography: Hideo Yamamoto
- Edited by: Soichi Ueno
- Music by: Kiyoko Ogino
- Production companies: Fuji Television; Cine Bazar
- Distributed by: Toho
- Release date: October 29, 2011 (Japan)
- Running time: 142 minutes
- Country: Japan
- Language: Japanese
- Box office: $54.08 million

A Ghost of a Chance (Japanese: ステキな金縛り, Hepburn: Suteki na Kanashibari; lit. "Fantastic Sleep Paralysis"), also known as Once In a Blue Moon in Japan, is a 2011 Japanese comedy mystery film directed by Kōki Mitani.

== Plot ==
Emi Hosho, a third-rate lawyer without much of a future, is tasked with defending Goro Yabe, a man arrested for the murder of his wife. Without much hope of winning, Yabe proclaims his innocence, saying that he was under sleep paralysis at the time of the murder. Emi heads to the inn where Yabe stayed and encounters the ghost of fallen samurai Rokubei Sarashina, who claims he was the one holding Yabe in sleep paralysis. Rokubei is brought to the court as a witness. However, the prosecution denies the existence of the occult, asserting that Rokubei's testimony is inadmissible in court. So begins the struggle to prove Yabe's innocence.

== Cast ==
- Eri Fukatsu - Emi Hosho (lawyer)
- Toshiyuki Nishida - Rokubei Sarashina (fallen samurai)
- Hiroshi Abe - Yu Hayami (lawyer)
- Kiichi Nakai - Tooru Osano (prosecutor)
- Yūko Takeuchi - Suzuko Yabe (murder victim), Fuuko Hino (sister of the deceased)
- Tadanobu Asano - Kenichi Kido (historian, Rokubei's descendant)
- Tsuyoshi Kusanagi - Teruo Hosho (Emi's father)
- Fumiyo Kohinata - Jouji Danda
