= Lucky Seven (TV series) =

- Also known as: ラッキーセブン
- Genre: Police procedural Drama
- Directed by: Shinsuke Sato; Narita Gaku; Hirano Shin
- Starring: Jun Matsumoto; Eita
- Country of origin: Japan
- Original language: Japanese
- No. of episodes: 10

Production
- Producers: Shigeoka Yumiko; Daisuke Sekiguchi
- Running time: 45 minutes
- Production company: Fuji Television

Original release
- Network: Fuji Television
- Release: 16 January – 19 March 2012

Lucky Seven Rakkīsebun (ラッキーセブン, Rakkīsebun) is a 2012 Japanese television drama broadcast by Fuji Television from January 16 to March 19, 2012. It stars Jun Matsumoto and Eita.

== Cast ==
- Shuntaro Tokita (Jun Matsumoto)
- Teru Nitta (Eita Nagayama)
- Toko Fujisaki (Nanako Matsushima)
- Ryu Makabe (Shosuke Tanihara)
- Junpei Asahi (Yo Oizumi)
- Asuka Mizuno (Riisa Naka)
- Yuki Kirihara (Kazue Fukiishi)
- Mei Kayano (Mari Iriki)
- Kojiro Tokita (Keiichiro Koyama)
- Masashi Goto (Akio Kaneda)
- Yuriko Tokita (Kumiko Okae)
- Masayoshi Tsukushi (Kazuko Kadono)

=== Guests ===
- Kenji Mizuhashi - Takumi Matsuura (ep.1)
- Yurie Midori - Mana Matsuura (ep.1)
- Wakana Matsumoto - Mika (ep.1)
- Lily Franky - Mitsuo Sasaoka (ep.2)
- Shingo Tsurumi - Minegishi (ep.2)
- Mahiru Konno - Shakou Okamoto (ep.3)
- Toshihide Tonesaku - Kazunori Minowa (ep.3)
- Taro Omiya - Kenichi Mineei (ep.4–5)
- Bokuzo Masana - Hiroshi Hayashibara (ep.4–5)
- Mayuko Nishiyama - Shinsuko Nitta (ep.5)
- Kisuke Iida - Tamotsu Kobayashi (ep.6)
- Toru Nomaguchi - Takashi Shikishima (ep.6)
- Noriko Nakagoshi - Youko Chisaki (ep.7)
- Asami Tano - Satoko Yamashita (ep.7)
- Kumi Mizuno - Tome Nakamura (ep.7)
- Yumiko Shaku - Tsukiko Iizuka (ep.8)
- Yasuyuki Maekawa - Shinsaku Tachifuji (ep.8)
- Yoshihiko Hosoda - Makoto Shindo (ep.8)
- Takeshi Kaga - Keisuke Yagami (ep.9–10)
- Kaho - Shiori Mochizuki (ep.9–10)
- Masaru Nagai - mysterious man (ep.9–10)
- Erika Okuda - Yukari Makitani (ep.9–10)
- Akira Otaka - Masato Fujisaki (ep.9–10)

== Episodes ==
Episode No.	Episode Title	Broadcast Date	Ratings
Episode 1	The freshman detective is given his first mission from the boss!	January 16, 2012	16.3%
Shuntaro Tokita is a 28 years old unemployed and unmotivated who love to spend most of his time hang around with women, even though the women herself is already married. One day after spending a night with a girl, Shuntaro was unaware if he was being spied by three detective from Lucky 7 Detective Agency Firm, Teru Nitta, Junpei Asahi and Asuka Mizuno, who was hired by the girl's husband to spied on her for an extramarital affair possibility. However Shuntaro then realize that he was being tail, but unable to catch the three detectives. The next day, Shuntaro accidentally saw one of the detective who tailed him yesterday, Nitta, and chased him all the way through Nitta office, the office of Lucky 7 Detective Agency Firm. However upon fighting with Nitta at Lucky 7 Detective Agency Firm office, The President of Lucky 7 Detective Agency Firm, Toko Fujisaki, saw Shuntaro talent and ability which she consider to be a perfect talent and ability for a Detective. Toko then offer Shuntaro a job as a Detective at Lucky 7 Detective Agency Firm and Shuntaro then accepted it. Later-on Shuntaro was task along with Nitta and Junpei for his first assignment to locate a brother of a client of Lucky 7 Detective Agency Firm.
Episode 2	Investigate the genius researcher	January 23, 2012	16.9%
Nitta was tasked to infiltrate a large pharmaceutical company to find-out about a genius researcher who was developing a new type of medicine that could cure several disease that was deem uncurable. However Nitta then learn if there was a conspiracy within the company to use the medicine for their own benefit.
Episode 3	Catch that romance scammer	January 30, 2012	15.2%
A client of Lucky 7 Detective Agency Firm asked the firm detectives to spy on her girlfriend due to his suspicion of her cheating on him. But upon tailing on the client girlfriend, the detectives learn that the client's girlfriend is actually a single-mother who was once cheated by her previous boyfriend that cost her house and work hard all the way to regain back her house as she promises her daughter that one day they would return to their house which was confiscated by the bank as a result of her previous boyfriend's cunning act.
Episode 4	The tempting trap	February 6, 2012	15.4%
Nitta was tasked to spy on a high-ranking corporate executive. But spying on him, Nitta then learn about the dark past of the corporation where the executive work which link to several old case of the Lucky 7 Detective Agency Firm. However Nitta was then framed by several people connected with the corporation for conducting illegal surveillance, forcing him to go on the run.
Episode 5	Premonition of a separation, running through the night	February 13, 2012	15.2%
Nitta who's already being framed for conducting illegal surveillance, later-on lead to the Lucky 7 Detective Agency Firm being investigated for what happened to Nitta and was forced to cease all of its activity. But then Lucky 7 Detective Agency Firm President, Toko, gave a testimony to the investigator about what really happened and eventually Lucky 7 Detective Agency Firm was cleared of all its illegal surveillance charge and was allowed to resume its Detective Firm practice. However Nitta who bear the burden of what was happening, later-on admit to Shuntaro that he cannot resume his work as detective in Lucky 7 Detective Agency Firm and decided to resign in-order to work on his father's old company.
Episode 6	The first and worst! case	February 20, 2012	14.6%
The Lucky 7 Detective Agency Firm now back in business. But when Shuntaro accompanied Asuka to a dog festival, he accidentally met his brother and his son whom also attending a meet greet of a cast of a famous detective TV Show, Ryu Makabe, whom also held at a same place. But then, when Shuntaro accidentally meet Ryu Makabe, he told him that he was actually being tailed by someone and asked Shuntaro for assistance, which turns-out to be an old fans of Ryu Makabe who was jealous of him. Later-on a husband of Lucky 7 Detective Agency Firm client who was being spy by the detectives from Lucky 7 Detective Agency Firm, storm the office of Lucky 7 Detective Agency Firm and try to burn all of the evidence that shows his extramaritial affair, but thanks to Shuntaro and the other detectives his action was eventually thwarted.
Episode 7	When you fall in love...	February 27, 2012	13.6%
An old lady asked Lucky 7 Detective Agency Firm to help her to communicate with her deceased boyfriend who already passed away for 70 years. Although reluctant at the beginning, the detectives eventually agree to help her. However Junpei who was tasked to locate the lady deceased boyfriend, later got scared for getting the creep after he thought that he was actually calling the ghost of the lady deceased boyfriend.
Episode 8	The scandal of the beautiful hostess!	March 5, 2012	15.5%
A hostess of a famous club in Ginza asked for a help from Lucky 7 Detective Agency Firm to protect her from his client who intimidating her. However the detectives later learn that the client of the hostess was actually a powerful corporate executive who try to muster all the power that he had in-order to find a way to cover-up his relationship with the hostess for the sake of his future political career. Later-on Junpei learn that Nitta was actually not working on his father old company and realize that something not right has happened that led to the opening of a previous unsolved case of Lucky 7 Detective Agency Firm.
Episode 9	The trap called love	March 12, 2012	15.6%
Shuntaro was tasked to protect a girl who was being stalked by an unknown men. Toko learn about something that surrounded the mystery of her father's death 16 years ago. A daughter of her father old friend later-on give her back the diary of Toko's father that has been missing for years which could led to the unsolved mystery of her father death. However the girl Shuntaro was tasked to protect turns-out to be an associate of a company that was investigated by Toko's father when he died in a mysterious circumstances and was tasked to steal Toko's father diary, but thanks to Shuntaro the stealing was thwarted and the diary of Toko's father was able to be saved. But unbeknown to Toko's and all of Lucky 7 Detective Agency Firm detectives, that they all being stalked by people hired by the corporation that was investigated by Toko's late father. Toko was then kidnapped by the people hired by the corporation and while Junpei and Shuntaro try to stop the kidnapping, it was already too late.
Episode 10	Friends forever!	March 19, 2012	16.9%
Toko is kidnapped by the people hired by the corporation who was investigated for their illegal doing by Toko's late father at the time of his death and was being held captive somewhere where the detectives are unable to locate it. The girl whom previously protected by Shuntaro and a mole of the corporation, later demanded that Shuntaro give her Toko's late father diary to her or else they will kill Toko. Shuntaro then agreed to the demand, but unbeknownst to her that he place a locating device at the diary. The detectives later-on managed to locate the place where Toko's being held captive and managed to rescued her from the people hired by the corporation. Later-on Shuntaro also told that before he handed the diary to the girl who turns-out to be the corporation mole, he managed to photocopy Toko's late father diary. Eventually Toko's and the detective managed to find the clue that could solve the mystery of Toko's late father death and also the corporation misconduct and illegal activity that was investigated by Toko's late father, thus eventually making the corporation being held accountable for their misconduct and illegal activity that led to the arrest of the corporation high-ranking executive which was implicated in the murder of Toko's late father.
Special Episode	A clever trap set by a genius professor	January 3, 2013	15.0%
Lucky 7 Detective Agency Firm was tasked to investigate the missing of an owner of a famous food store. But when they investigate the missing owner of the store, they learn of a large investment scheme that was profited by manipulating their client investment which led to their client business when bankrupt while enriching the genius professor who was the initiator of the investment scheme. The detectives must stop the professor and his scheme once and for all before causing another business to become their victim that could led to the bankruptcy of its business.

== See also ==
- Fuji Television
- List of Japanese television dramas
