= Free (Erika song) =

Single by Erika
- Released: July 4, 2007
- Genre: J-pop
- Label: Sony Music
- Songwriters: Erika Sawajiri; Maika Shiratori
- Producer: COZZi

Erika singles chronology
"Free" (2007)	"Destination Nowhere" (2007)

"Free" is the first single by Japanese singer Erika Sawajiri under the alias Erika.

== Single information ==
The single was released in two editions: a first press/limited edition and a regular edition. The regular edition contains the B-sides "FANTASY", "Time to go home", and the instrumental for "Free". The first press/limited edition contains the music video for "Free". The album jacket covers for both versions are different.

The single reached number 1 on its first day on the Oricon charts and obtained the same spot in its first week. The song "Free" was used for the commercial promoting Subaru Stella and R2. The b-side song, "Fantasy", was used as the song in the commercial promoting music.jp.

== Track list ==
Regular Edition
No.	Title	Lyrics	Music	Length
1.	"FREE"	Erika, Maika Shiratori	COZZi	3:43
2.	"FANTASY"	Erika, Hyoue Yasuhara	Hyoue Yasuhara	4:02
3.	"Time to go home"	Kenn Kato	COZZi	3:47
4.	"FREE (Instrumental)"			3:43

Limited Edition DVD
No.	Title	Length
1.	"FREE (video clip)"	3:58

== Charts ==
=== Oricon Sales Chart (Japan) ===
Release	Chart	Peak position	Sales total	Chart run
July 4, 2007	Oricon Daily Singles Chart	1		
July 4, 2007	Oricon Weekly Singles Chart	1	120,000	14+
July 4, 2007	Oricon Monthly Singles Chart	4		
July 4, 2007	Oricon Yearly Singles Chart	67		
