= Dear Friends (2007 film) =

- Film poster
- Directed by: Kazuyuki Morosawa
- Written by: Yoshi
- Produced by: Toei Company
- Starring: Keiko Kitagawa; Yuika Motokariya; Masaya Kikawada; Airi Toriyama; Mao Sasaki; Hatsune Matsushima; Mantaro Koichi; Naoko Otani; Yoshiko Miyazaki; Ren Osugi
- Release date: February 3, 2007 (Japan)
- Running time: 115 minutes
- Country: Japan
- Language: Japanese

Dear Friends (Japanese: ディアフレンズ) is a 2007 drama film written by Yoshi and directed by Kazuyuki Morosawa. The film stars Keiko Kitagawa and Yuika Motokariya in its lead roles. It is adapted from the manga Dear Friends by YOSHI, and art by Ayu Watanabe.

The tagline for the film is "Are friends necessary?" (友達は必要ですか) The theme song is also called "Dear Friends", which is performed by Soulhead.

== Plot ==
Dear Friends follows a high-school student named Rina (played by Keiko Kitagawa) who believes that friends are not necessary and that they can only be used in times of need. Thus, she is unable to maintain a decent relationship with her friends and classmates. Her family's relationship is also lacking; her father does not care much about his family and her mother is over-protective.

Rina spends a lot of her time going to a club in Shibuya where Yousuke (played by Masaya Kikawada) is the disc jockey with her friends Hiroko (played by Airi Toriyama) and Emi (played by Hatsune Matsushima). (In the opening scene, Rina has "borrowed" Hiroko's boyfriend for sex, infuriating Hiroko.) Yousuke falls for Rina, but her attitude has a feral edge, and they neck but stop short of having sex.

After obtaining a large amount of money under false pretenses (i.e. claiming she is pregnant when she is not and forcing the guy [not Hiroko's boyfriend or Yousuke] to pay for the abortion) and spending it on a bottle of Dom Pérignon (which she sprays over everyone at the club), Rina collapses on the dance floor. She eventually discovers that she has cancer (non-Hodgkin lymphoma) and becomes hospitalized for an indefinite amount of time. In the hospital, she is not visited by her family, but by one of her classmates named Maki (played by Yuika Motokariya). Although Maki tells Rina that they were friends in primary school, Rina does not remember her, so Maki takes the opportunity to re-connect with her. A young girl, Kanae, (played by Mao Sasaki) who is also hospitalized tries to become friends with Rina, but she holds fast onto her mantra of friends being unnecessary.

Throughout her hospitalization, Rina begins to lose hope as her well-being falls apart. Her hair falls out from the chemotherapy and she looks pale and thin. Rina learns that Kanae also had cancer (leukemia), and has died after a bone marrow transplant failed. Rina must undergo a mastectomy as the cancer has spread to her left breast. She decides to commit suicide by jumping off the hospital's rooftop. Before she can jump, however, she is confronted by Maki, who stabs herself in the chest with a knife and declares that she will share the same pain as Rina and that she does not want to lose her friend. Maki has suicidal tendencies (as evidenced by scars on her wrist), but sees in her relationship with Rina a reason to keep living. Rina shows some hope again when she realizes that she can find friendship in Maki, but she does not see Maki while the latter recovers from the stab wound.

Hiroko and Emi then visit Rina in the hospital ward. Hiroko throws away a love letter from Yousuke to Rina that she was supposed to deliver, then claims that she and Emi had three-way sex with him. Emi acknowledges this (even though it is new to her).

After treatment, Rina is discharged. She tries to go back to her party lifestyle, but cannot force herself to behave as she once did. She goes back to the club, where Emi apologizes for the hospital visit (claiming that Hiroko put her up to it) and states that Hiroko overdosed on drugs. Rina decides she is ready to have sex with Yousuke, but he has second thoughts after seeing Rina's mastectomy scar.

Rina goes back to the hospital rooftop to jump, but is stopped by the head nurse. The head nurse says that Maki wanted her to live, but Rina claims that Maki has not seen her recently. Then, another nurse pushes a zombie-like Maki in a wheelchair onto the rooftop. Maki says that the only reason she is still living is so that she could meet friends like Rina. Maki has a terminal illness: an unspecified neurodegenerative disease. Rina finds her purpose in life, fully recovered from cancer, applies to nursing school, becomes a nurse, and takes care of Maki during her final days. After three months, Maki dies.

== Cast ==
- Keiko Kitagawa as Rina
- Yuika Motokariya as Maki
- Airi Toriyama as Hiroko
- Hatsune Matsushima as Emi
- Masaya Kikawada as Yousuke
- Mao Sasaki as Kanae
- Avery Fane as Club DJ
- Naoko Otani as Rina's Mother
- Ren Osugi as Rina's Father
