= Hassei Takano =

Japanese actor

- 高野 八誠
- Born: Mitsuhiro Tsuda (津田 充博); January 9, 1978 (age 48); Chiba Prefecture, Japan
- Occupation: Actor
- Years active: 1989–present
- Height: 177 cm (5 ft 10 in)
- Spouse: Yukari Ishida
- Children: 1

Hassei Takano (高野 八誠, Takano Hassei; January 9, 1978) born Mitsuhiro Tsuda (津田 充博, Tsuda Mitsuhiro) in Chiba Prefecture is a Japanese actor. He has portrayed various superheroes in tokusatsu dramas, beginning with Ultraman Agul/Hiroya Fujimiya (ウルトラマンアグル/藤宮 博也, Urutoraman Aguru/Fujimiya Hiroya) in Ultraman Gaia in 1998, a role he reprised in the 2008 film Superior Ultraman 8 Brothers. This role was followed with Kamen Rider Raia/Miyuki Tezuka (仮面ライダーライア/手塚 海之, Kamen Raidā Raia/Tezuka Miyuki) in Kamen Rider Ryuki.

Hassei also appeared in 2004 film Oresama, alongside internationally recognised musician Miyavi.

He's also made his mark in Hayato Ichimonji (一文字 隼人, Ichimonji Hayato) in the films Kamen Rider The First and Kamen Rider The Next.

He also portrayed Kurando Magira in the science fiction drama Keitai Sousakan 7 (ケータイ捜査官７), and Kiyoi in the supernatural drama RH Plus.

He is married with Yukari Ishida (Reiko Fujimiya (née Yoshii) in Ultraman Gaia and Superior Ultraman 8 Brothers). They have a daughter named Hinaka. His family can be seen in Superior Ultraman 8 Brothers as they appear in this film as Hiroya, Reiko, and their daughter, respectively.
