= Love/Juice =

LOVE/JUICE
- Directed by: Kaze Shindō
- Written by: Kaze Shindō
- Produced by: Chikako Nakabayashi; Yukio Watanabe; Kazutoshi Wadakura
- Starring: Chinatsu Okuno
- Cinematography: Koji Kanaya
- Edited by: Yukio Watanabe
- Music by: Kenichiro Isoda
- Distributed by: Tsunku Town Films
- Release date: June 1, 2000
- Running time: 78 minutes
- Country: Japan
- Language: Japanese

Love/Juice is a 2000 Japanese film directed by Kaze Shindō. It is the debut feature film for Shindō (granddaughter of Kaneto Shindo).

Love/Juice received the Wolfgang Staudte Prize for Best Film at the 2001 Berlin International Film Festival.

== Plot ==
Twenty-something lesbian Chinatsu shares a one-bedroom apartment with the heterosexual Kyoko. Although Chinatsu and Kyoko have a passing attraction, Kyoko is mostly interested in men, particularly one who tends the fish in a pet store, who despite her efforts doesn't seem to be interested in her.

== Cast and characters ==
- Mika Okuno as Chinatsu
- Chika Fujimura as Kyoko
- Hidetoshi Nishijima as Sakamoto
- Toshiya Nagasawa
