= Hero (2001 TV series) =

2001 Japanese television series

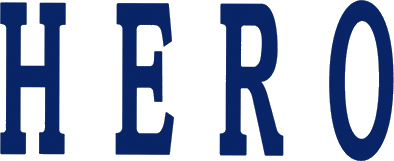
- Genre: Legal drama
- Starring: Takuya Kimura; Takako Matsu; Hiroshi Abe
- Ending theme: "Can You Keep a Secret?" by Hikaru Utada
- Composer: Takayuki Hattori
- Country of origin: Japan
- No. of episodes: 11

Production
- Running time: approx. 46 min.

Original release
- Network: Fuji TV
- Release: January 8 – March 19, 2001

Hero is a Japanese drama series that first aired on Fuji TV in from January to March 2001. Following a television special and a film adaptation, Fuji TV aired a second series called Hero 2 in 2014. Both series starred Takuya Kimura as a renegade public prosecutor in Tokyo.

The original 2001 series achieved unusually high ratings, with over 30% audience share per episode. It was the highest Japanese TV drama ratings record in 25 years (average audience share over the entire series was 34.3%). The feature film entitled Hero: The Movie which reached #3 on the 2007 top-grossing film chart in Japan.

== Plot ==
Kuryu Kohei is a young public prosecutor who gets transferred to a division in Tokyo from Aomori. Kuryu is unlike a typical prosecutor; he refuses to wear a suit and tie, opting for casual clothing, his trademark orange down jacket and stylish boots. He looks and behaves more like a Generation X slacker. He is known for always buying bizarre items from infomercials and the home shopping network. Kuryu is a high-school dropout who was falsely accused of a felony, cleared only by a public prosecutor who took the time to uncover the facts. This has inspired Kuryu to abandon his delinquent lifestyle, take his high school equivalency, study for the bar exam and pass with flying colours. Also, when he was 17 yrs old, he was arrested whilst trying to protect a friend. [ Hero season 1, ep 10.]

Kuryu's brilliant investigative instincts and determination make him well-suited as an investigator and advocate. Kuryu's job is to interview suspects and decide whether to proceed with pressing charges against them. However, unlike his colleagues, rather than sit behind a desk and rubber-stamp suspects for trial, Kuryu will leave the office and (literally) do the legwork, go the extra mile and doggedly pursue the truth. However, his unorthodox approach generally generates a lot of antagonism and negative publicity.

Kuryu's colleagues are all concerned with status and position and do not think highly of Kuryu or his eccentricities. Amamiya Maiko, his paralegal assistant, is concerned with attaining her law credentials and becoming a full prosecutor. At first, she believes Kuryu's addition may help her chances but at the beginning of the series comes to detest Kuryu. Kuryu doesn't care too much how he is viewed and only cares about uncovering the truth of criminal allegations.

Throughout the series, Kuryu uncovers coerced confessions, unethical legal practices, corruption, obstruction from overzealous cops, sensationalistic media, interference from politicians and well connected, powerful elites. Over the course of the series, his idealism and dogged pursuit for truth and justice ignite a similar passion in his colleagues, especially Amamiya.

By the end of the series, Kuryu is transferred to Ishigaki Island because of all the commotion he causes.

A running gag of the series was the bartender who miraculously and instantly produced anything a person asked for, even if it was something rare, obscure or unlikely to be expected at a Japanese bar. The bartender would never say a word except "Aru yo," meaning "I got it".

== 2006 TV special ==
The popularity of the 2001 series spawned a two-hour special in 2006. In the special, 5 years has passed since the events of the TV series. Kuryu has been transferred from Ishigaki to Sapporo and finally ends up assigned to a small coastal village in rural Yamaguchi Prefecture. There, he inspires a new group of small town prosecutors and paralegals while investigating a murder possibly implicating a favorite local politician. The events of this special lead into the 2007 feature film.

== Hero 2 (2014 TV series) ==
Hero
- Genre: Legal Drama
- Starring: Takuya Kimura; Keiko Kitagawa; Tetta Sugimoto
- Country of origin: Japan
- No. of episodes: 11

Production
- Running time: approx. 54 min.

Original release
- Release: July 14 – September 22, 2014

This series takes place 7 years after the events of the feature film. Kuryu returns to the same Tokyo office from the first series and feature film. Also reprising their roles will be Kadano Takuzo, Kohinata Fumio, Yashima Norito and Tanaka Yoji. Bokuzo Masana, who had a nonspeaking role as the security guard in the first series (and feature film), is promoted to a series regular. His character is now a paralegal. New cast members will be Sugimoto Tetta, Hamada Gaku, Matsushige Yutaka, and Yoshida Yo, as well as Kitagawa Keiko, who will be Kuryu's new assistant paralegal.

Katsumura Masanobu makes a cameo appearance in the first and tenth episode, while Otsuka Nene guest stars in the 4th episode. Kuryu's love interest from the first series and film, Amamiya (played by Matsu Takako), does not appear though she is mentioned a few times. When asked about Amamiya's whereabouts or his current relationship with her, Kuryu refuses to answer except to say "not everything works out"

== Hero (2015 feature film) ==
Kuryu and the cast of characters from the second TV series appeared in a 2015 feature film (not to be confused with the 2015 Bollywood film of the same name), featuring the return of Amamiya.

It reached the third highest-grossing position in the 2015 Japanese box office.

== Cast ==
=== Main cast (2001) ===
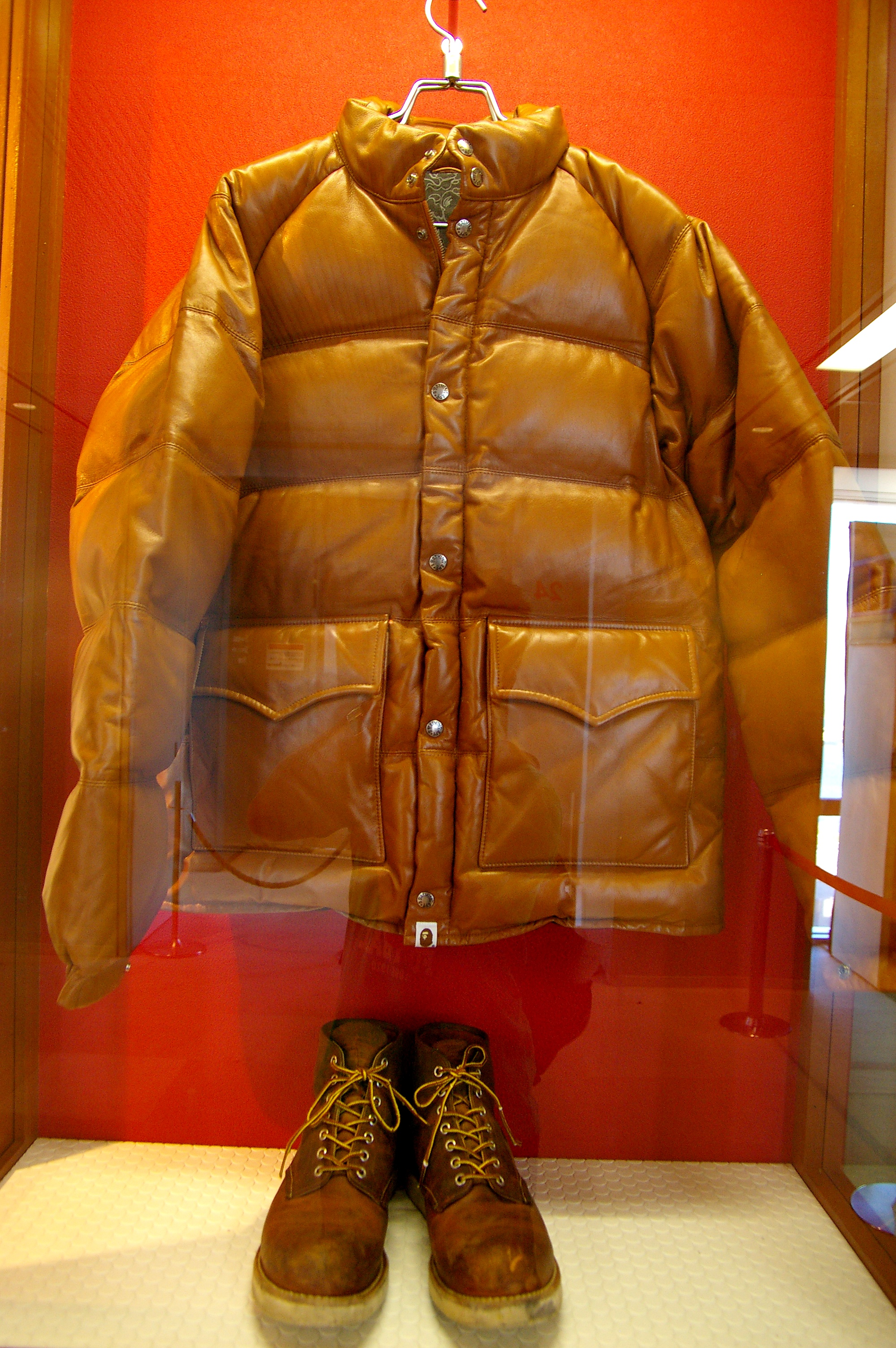
Takuya Kimura's costume in Hero

Actor	Role
Takuya Kimura	Kohei Kuryu (久利生 公平)
Takako Matsu	Maiko Amamiya (雨宮 舞子)
Hiroshi Abe	Mitsugu Shibayama (芝山 貢)
Nene Ōtsuka	Misuzu Nakamura (中村 美鈴)
Takuzō Kadono	Yutaka Ushimaru (牛丸 豊)
Masanobu Katsumura	Tatsuo Egami (江上 達夫)
Fumiyo Kohinata	Takayuki Suetsugu (末次 隆之)
Norito Yashima	Kenji Endo (遠藤 賢司)
Kiyoshi Kodama	Toshimitsu Nabeshima (鍋島 利光)

=== Supporting cast (2001) ===
Naoko Iijima, Ryō (りょう), Yōji Tanaka

=== Main cast (2014) ===
Actor	Role
Takuya Kimura	Kohei Kuryu (久利生 公平)
Keiko Kitagawa	Chika Asagi (麻木 千佳)
Yutaka Matsushige	Kenzaburō Kawajiri (川尻 健三郎)
Tetta Sugimoto	Masashi Tamura (田村 雅史)
Norito Yashima	Kenji Endo (遠藤 賢司)
Gaku Hamada	Daisuke Uno (宇野 大介)
Fumiyo Kohinata	Takayuki Suetsugu (末次 隆之)
Yō Yoshida	Reiko Baba (馬場 礼子)
Bokuzō Masana	Shūji Ido (井戸 秀二)
Takuzō Kadono	Yutaka Ushimaru (牛丸 豊)

=== Supporting cast (2014) ===
Yōji Tanaka, Naotarō Moriyama (ep.1), Shōsuke Tanihara (ep.2)

== Production notes ==
- The sound track and music scores for the series are available. The theme song, "Can You Keep a Secret?", is performed by the Japanese pop superstar Hikaru Utada.
- Utada made her television acting debut in a guest appearance in episode 8 of the drama. She appeared as a waitress and was on screen for only 14 seconds, bringing the series its peak TV rating at 36.8%. When asked if she would like to take on bigger roles, Utada replied that this wasn't the path she would like to be in.

== Ratings ==
In the tables below, the blue numbers represent the lowest ratings and the red numbers represent the highest ratings.

=== HERO 1 ===
Episode #	Original broadcast date	Kanton region
1	January 8, 2001	33.4%
2	January 15, 2001	32.7%
3	January 22, 2001	30.8%
4	January 29, 2001	30.7%
5	February 5, 2001	34.9%
6	February 12, 2001	36.1%
7	February 19, 2001	34.5%
8	February 26, 2001	36.8%
9	March 5, 2001	34.4%
10	March 12, 2001	35.1%
11	March 19, 2001	36.8%
Average		34.3%

=== HERO 2 ===
Episode #	Original broadcast date	Kanton region
1	July 14, 2014	26.5%
2	July 21, 2014	19.0%
3	July 28, 2014	20.5%
4	August 4, 2014	18.7%
5	August 11, 2014	21.0%
6	August 18, 2014	20.1%
7	August 25, 2014	19.0%
8	September 1, 2014	20.5%
9	September 8, 2014	20.2%
10	September 15, 2014	22.3%
11	September 22, 2014	22.9%
Average		21.3%
