= A Song to the Sun =

2006 film directed by Norihiro Koizumi

- Theatrical release poster
- Directed by: Norihiro Koizumi
- Screenplay by: Kenji Bandō
- Based on: Taiyō no Uta by Aya Tenkawa
- Starring: Yui; Takashi Tsukamoto; Airi Toriyama; Kuniko Asagi; Goro Kishitani; Sogen Tanaka
- Cinematography: Kōichi Nakayama
- Edited by: Chise Sanjo
- Music by: Yui
- Distributed by: Shochiku Co., Ltd. (Japan)
- Release date: June 17, 2006 (Japan)
- Running time: 119 minutes
- Country: Japan
- Language: Japanese
- Box office: ¥1.05 billion

A Song to the Sun (Japanese: タイヨウのうた, Hepburn: Taiyō no Uta; alternatively titled Midnight Sun) is a 2006 Japanese romantic drama film directed by Norihiro Koizumi and starring Yui. It is based on a novel of the same name by Aya Tenkawa.

Upon release, A Song to the Sun was financially successful and helped launch Yui's music career. In addition, Yui also won the Best Newcomer Actress at the 30th Japan Academy Film Prize for her role. Several adaptations of the film were made, including a 2006 television series, a 2018 American remake, and stage plays.

== Plot ==
Kaoru has Xeroderma Pigmentosum, a medical condition that forbids its bearer from being exposed to direct sunlight. She sleeps during the day, and is active at night. She busks every night in front of a station, playing the guitar. Outside her bedroom window, she spots a high school boy with a surfboard. She watches him and his friends visit the ocean every morning before going to sleep. One day, she introduces herself to him without letting him know about her medical condition. The man identifies himself to be Kōji Fujishiro. When her friend drags her home, they sit by her window, while they watch Kōji meet his friends. Kaoru explains everything, and her friend notes that she probably goes to the same school as him, and offers to spy on him for her.

The next evening, she sits by the bus stop. Kōji arrives on his scooter. Both embarrassed, they start talking, with Kōji eventually promising to meet her, and listen to her sing another night, at the start of the school holidays. When they meet up, another obnoxious street performer has taken her spot. Kōji decides to take her to the city, where after seeing the sights, she starts playing in a square. A substantial crowd gathers to hear her sing. Afterwards, they watch the ocean, and Kōji asks her out.

Their date ends abruptly as the sun rises and Kaoru rushes back home. Kōji is soon informed of Kaoru's condition, and is taken aback. For a while, Kaoru stubbornly refuses to see him. Kōji learns of a recording studio, where Kaoru could record her debut single, and takes up small jobs to earn the money and pay for it. Her father, out of concern, invites Kōji over one night. At dinner, Kōji reveals his plans for Kaoru's CD. As they walk home that night, the two begin to talk, and Kaoru slowly realizes how much Kōji truly cares for her.

As her medical condition begins to worsen over time, she loses feeling in her hands, and is unable to play guitar. She assures Kōji that she still has her voice.

In the studio, she asks her family and friends to leave. She asks them to wait for the CD.

Some time later, as promised, Kōji brings Kaoru to the beach to watch him surf. The protective suit she had left hanging for years is finally used. By now, she is in a wheelchair. She complains that the suit is getting hot. With a painful expression that fades quickly, Kaoru's father tries to convince her that if she takes off the suit, it cannot bother her anymore, and that she could run around freely. She declines, and while struggling to stand up, she limps weakly toward Kōji. As she walks, she trips over the sand, and Kōji rushes to tend to her. She catches herself at the last minute, revealing that it was a feint, and giggles at his surprised face.

Later, Kaoru succumbs to her medical condition and eventually dies. She is laid to rest in a coffin full of sunflowers. Kōji and Kaoru's friends and family listen as Kaoru's CD is finally released. In the final scene, Kōji rushes towards the waves with his mind replaying her voice.

== Cast ==
- Yui - Kaoru Amane
- Takashi Tsukamoto - Koji Fujishiro
- Kuniko Asagi - Yuki Amane (Kaoru's mother)
- Goro Kishitani - Ken Amane (Kaoru's father)
- Airi Toriyama - Misaki Matsumae (Kaoru's best friend)
- Eri Fuse
- Gaku Hamada
- Takashi Kobayashi
- Magy
- Sogen Tanaka - Haruo Kato

== Production ==
The film featured the songs "Good-bye Days", "Skyline", and "It's Happy Line" by Yui.

=== Release ===
There are two Japanese DVD releases of Taiyō no Uta, a standard and a premium edition. The premium edition includes a bonus disc with nearly 90 minutes of making-of footage, deleted scenes, the music video for the song "Good-bye Days", and interviews with Yui, Takashi Tsukamoto and the film's director. It also has special features of Yui's Diary and a pick pendant with a necklace. Only making of Taiyō no Uta was released on June 2, 2006. Both standard edition and premium editions were released on June 11, 2006.

== Reception ==
Russell Edwards from Variety stated that the film was "sweet", but suggested that Western audiences would be less receptive towards the romance themes than Asian audiences. He also complimented the film's method of highlighting Kamakura without relying on tourism clichés and the actors' performances.

== Awards and nominations ==
Year	Award	Category	Recipient	Result
2007	30th Japan Academy Film Prize	Best Newcomer	Yui	Won

== Adaptations ==
=== Television drama ===
In 2006, a television drama adaptation of the same name aired on TBS, starring Erika Sawajiri and Takayuki Yamada. The theme song, "Taiyō no Uta", was performed by Sawajiri and released under the name Kaoru Amane as a tie-in, which also helped launch her solo singing career.

=== Manga ===
A manga adaptation written and illustrated by Rin Mikimoto was serialized in Bessatsu Friend in 2006. The chapters were later released in one bound volume by Kodansha.

No.	Japanese release date	Japanese ISBN
1	January 10, 2007	978-4-06-341509-4

=== Stage plays ===
A South Korean musical theatre adaptation ran in 2010, starring Girls' Generation member Taeyeon as Kaoru.

A Japanese stage play titled Taiyō no Uta: Midnight Sun ran from September 5–9 and October 10–14 in 2018, starring Hinata Kashiwagi as Kaoru and Yudai Tatsumi as Koji.

A second South Korean musical adaptation titled Midnight Sun ran in 2021 from May to July.

=== Remakes ===
A Vietnamese remake based on 2006 television drama series titled Khúc hát mặt trời (literally translated as "A Song to the Sun") aired on VTV3 from November 25, 2015 to February 18, 2016, starring Nhã Phương as Yến Phương (originally Kaoru) and Quang Tuấn as Quân (originally Koji).

In May 2015, writer Eric Kirsten announced an American adaptation of the film titled Midnight Sun, which is centered on Washington, USA. The film stars Bella Thorne as Katie (originally Kaoru) and Patrick Schwarzenegger as Charlie (originally Koji). The film was released March 23, 2018.

A South Korean film remake, 태양의 노래 (Taeyang-ui norae, literally translated as Song to the Sun), but known to English audiences as Midnight Sun, was released in 2025.
