= Hiroshima (1995 film) =

Japanese-Canadian war drama TV film

- Directed by: Koreyoshi Kurahara; Roger Spottiswoode
- Written by: John Hopkins; Toshiro Ishido
- Produced by: Robin Spry; Kazutoshi Wadakura; Andrew Adelson; Tracey Alexander; Michael Campus; Tetsuya Ikeda; Paul E. Painter
- Starring: see below
- Cinematography: Shohei Ando; Pierre Mignot
- Edited by: John Soh; Mark Conte; Dominique Fortin; Denis Papillon
- Production companies: Telescene Film Group; Cine Bazar
- Distributed by: Showtime Network
- Release date: 1995
- Running time: 186 min. (DVD version)
- Languages: English, Japanese

Hiroshima is a 1995 Japanese-Canadian war drama film directed by Koreyoshi Kurahara and Roger Spottiswoode about the decision-making processes that led to the dropping of the atomic bombs by the United States on the Japanese cities of Hiroshima and Nagasaki toward the end of World War II. The three-hour film was made for television (Showtime Network) and had no theatrical release.

A combination of dramatization, historical footage, and eyewitness interviews, the film alternates between documentary footage and dramatic recreations. The dramatizations and most of the original footage are presented as sepia-toned images, serving to blur the distinction between them. The languages are English and Japanese, with subtitles, and the actors are largely Canadian and Japanese.

== Synopsis ==
The film opens on 12 April 1945 with the death of Franklin Roosevelt and the succession of Harry Truman to the presidency. In Europe, the Germans are close to surrender, but in the Pacific the bloody battle for Okinawa is still under way. American casualties have almost reached 900,000, with Japanese casualties at 1.1 million; 8 million Asian civilians have died in the war that began with Japan's 1931 invasion of Manchuria.

The new president knows nothing about the nuclear weapons being developed at Los Alamos, and he must decide on whether to use them and how. When nuclear physicist Leo Szilard delivers a petition signed by 73 scientists urging the president not to deploy the bomb, U.S. Secretary of State James F. Byrnes tells him: "You do not spend two billion dollars and then show them [American voters] nothing." Also urging deployment is Maj. Gen. Leslie Groves, director of the Manhattan Project. The Interim Committee appointed by Truman recommends unanimously that he use the bomb on "war plants surrounded by worker housing", without warning. General George Marshall lays out plans for the invasion of Kyūshū in November and Honshū in March 1946.

In Japan, Minister of War General Anami Korechika argues that the homeland must be defended. The voice of reason is the new civilian prime minister, Kantarō Suzuki. In Tokyo, Admiral Yonai Mitsumasa assures the cabinet of victory.

On July 16, the Trinity test shows that a plutonium bomb (Fat Man) is feasible and that a nuclear blast is even more powerful than scientists predicted. The uranium bomb (Little Boy, which is untested but is expected to work) leaves Los Alamos for Tinian island in the Pacific. At the Potsdam conference, Joseph Stalin promises to join the war against Japan. Winston Churchill urges Truman to use the bomb to constrain Russian expansion. The Allied leaders deliver an ultimatum to Japan "to give them one last chance."

Truman strikes Kyoto off the target list, leaving Hiroshima as the primary target. The Enola Gay makes the drop on the morning of August 6, 1945. On August 9, the Soviet Union invades Manchuria and the Fat Man plutonium bomb devastates Nagasaki. Hirohito finally intervenes, telling the cabinet that Japan "must endure the unendurable" and surrender. Young army officers urge General Anami to join them in a military coup, but he tells them: "The emperor has spoken; we must obey him." On August 15, the emperor's surrender message is broadcast to Japan, and Anami commits ritual suicide.

== Reception ==
Though not widely reviewed, Hiroshima was praised online: "Fascinating, and surprisingly ambivalent, docudrama rehashes familiar terrain with remarkable freshness precisely because of the emphasis on the politicians (rather than on the scientists), the bi-national approach, and an odd mixing of dramatization, newsreel footage, and even a few talking-head interviews with people who were there."

== Awards ==
- 12th Gemini Awards, Toronto: Best Dramatic TV Movie or Mini-Series, 1998
- 12th Gemini Awards, Toronto: Best Direction in a Dramatic Program or Mini-Series, Roger Spottiswoode, 1998
- 12th Gemini Awards, Toronto: Best Performance by an Actor in a Leading Role in a Dramatic Program or Mini-Series, Kenneth Welsh, 1998
- Humanitas Prize, USA: Writing Award, PBS/Cable Television, to John Hopkins & Toshiro Ishido 1997
- 48th Primetime Emmy Awards, Los Angeles: Nominee: Outstanding Miniseries, 1996

== Cast ==
- Kenneth Welsh - President Harry S. Truman
- J. Winston Carroll (as J.W. Carroll) - Chief Justice Harlan F. Stone
- Ken Jenkins - Secretary of State James F. Byrnes
- Wesley Addy - Secretary of War Henry L. Stimson
- Colin Fox - Secretary of the Navy James Forrestal
- Tom Rack - Under Secretary of the Navy Ralph Bard
- Bernard Behrens - Asst. Secretary of War John J. McCloy
- George R. Robertson - Fleet Admiral William D. Leahy
- James Bradford - Fleet Admiral Ernest J. King
- Leon Pownall - General of the Army George Marshall
- Kurt Reis - General Thomas T. Handy
- Richard Masur - Major General Leslie R. Groves
- Cedric Smith - Major General Curtis LeMay
- Vlasta Vrána - Brigadier General Tom Farrell
- David Gow - Colonel Paul Tibbets
- Robert Morelli - Colonel William H. Blanchard
- Gary Reineke - Captain William 'Deke' Parsons, USN
- Tim Post - Major Thomas Ferebee
- Mark Camacho - Major Charles Sweeney
- Martin Neufeld Second Lieutenant Morris R. Jeppson
- Jeffrey DeMunn - Professor J. Robert Oppenheimer
- Saul Rubinek - Professor Leo Szilard
- Domenico Fiore (as Dom Fiore) - Professor Harold Urey
- Erwin Potitt - Professor Hoffmann
- Philip Pretten (as Phillip Pretten) - Charles E. Bohlen
- Sheena Larkin - Bess Truman
- Timothy West (as Tim West) - Prime Minister Winston Churchill
- Serge Christianssens (as Serge Christiaenssens) - Marshal Joseph Stalin
- Naohiko Umewaka - Emperor Hirohito
- Kazuo Katô - Prince Fumimaro Konoye
- Tatsuo Matsumura - Prime Minister Kantarō Suzuki
- Hisashi Igawa - Foreign Minister Shigenori Tōgō
- Kohji Takahashi - Minister of War Korechika Anami
- Yuzo Hayakawa - Minister of the Navy Koshirō Oikawa
- Zenichi Inagawa - Baron Hiranuma Kiichirō
- Sakae Koike - Admiral Teijirō Toyoda

== See also ==
- Atomic bombings of Hiroshima and Nagasaki
- Surrender of Japan
- List of historical drama films
- List of historical drama films of Asia
