= Andalucia: Revenge of the Goddess =

2011 film

- Film poster
- Directed by: Hiroshi Nishitani
- Written by: Yuichi Shinbo; Junya Ikegami
- Produced by: Hirotsugu Usui; Kazutoshi Wadakura
- Starring: Yūji Oda; Meisa Kuroki; Hideaki Itō; Erika Toda; Masaharu Fukuyama
- Cinematography: Hideo Yamamoto
- Edited by: Masaaki Yamamoto
- Music by: Yugo Kanno
- Release date: 25 June 2011 (Japan)
- Running time: 125 minutes
- Country: Japan
- Language: Japanese

Andalucia: Revenge of the Goddess (Japanese: アンダルシア 女神の報復, Hepburn: Andarushia Megami no Hōfuku) is a 2011 Japanese drama film directed by Hiroshi Nishitani. It is the sequel to the film Amalfi: Rewards of the Goddess and the TV series The Diplomat Kosaku Kuroda.

== Cast ==
- Yūji Oda as Kosaku Kuroda
- Meisa Kuroki as Yuka Shindo
- Hideaki Itō as Makoto Kotari
- Erika Toda as Kanae Adachi
- Masaharu Fukuyama as Saeki Shogo
- Shōsuke Tanihara as Naoki Kawashima
- Takeshi Kaga as Yosuke Ando
- Isao Natsuyagi as Seijuro Murakami
