= Kamen Rider: The First =

- Theatrical release poster
- Kanji: 仮面ライダー THE FIRST
- Revised Hepburn: Kamen Raidā Za Fāsuto
- Directed by: Takao Nagaishi
- Screenplay by: Toshiki Inoue
- Based on: Kamen Rider by Shotaro Ishinomori
- Produced by: Kazuo Katō; Shinichirō Shirakura; Naomi Takebe; Kōichi Yada
- Starring: Masaya Kikawada; Hassei Takano; Komine Rena; Hiroshi Miyauchi; Eiji Wentz; Ryoko Kobayashi; Sada Mayumi; Issa Hentona; Itsuji Itao; Kanji Tsuda
- Cinematography: Kazushige Tanaka
- Edited by: Hiroshi Sunaga
- Music by: Gorou Yasukawa
- Production companies: Toei Company; Toei Channel; Toei Advertising; Toei Video
- Distributed by: Toei Company, Ltd.
- Release date: November 5, 2005
- Running time: 90 minutes
- Country: Japan
- Language: Japanese

Kamen Rider: The First (仮面ライダー THE FIRST, Kamen Raidā Za Fāsuto; Masked Rider: The First) is a 2005 Japanese superhero film. The film is a reboot adaptation of the television series Kamen Rider, though there are many differences between the film and the original programme; some of these, however, are due to a closer reliance on the original Kamen Rider manga by Shotaro Ishinomori. Written by Toshiki Inoue and directed by Takao Nagaishi, the film stars Masaya Kikawada as Takeshi Hongo/Kamen Rider 1 and Hassei Takano as Hayato Ichimonji/Kamen Rider 2.

The film was released theatrically on November 5, 2005, though it had several early screenings around Tokyo during the previous two months, beginning on October 23, at the Tokyo Film Festival. While it was the first Kamen Rider to be released independently, it was not screened on major Toei-affiliated cinemas, and was only shown on around 20 theatres during its first day. It was released on Region 2 DVD on April 21, 2006. American anime distributor Media Blasters released the film subtitled-only on Region 1 DVD on April 3, 2007, but this version of the film is no longer in print. They did tease the possible release of the movie in 2022.

The film's theme song is "Bright! our Future" by Da Pump, though the opening features a small portion of the original Kamen Rider theme song, "Let's Go!! Rider Kick", sung by Masato Shimon.

The film was produced by Ishinomori Productions and Toei, who have also produced every previous television series and films in the Kamen Rider franchise. It was followed by a sequel, Kamen Rider: The Next.

== Plot ==
One year prior, two terminally ill hospital patients Haruhiko Mitamura and his love interest Miyoko Harada are given a chance to live by the terrorist organization Sacred Hegemony of Cycle Kindred Evolutional Realm, otherwise known as "Shocker", who relocate them to their island base to convert them into the cyborg Inhumanoids Cobra and Snake.

In the present, Shocker Inhumanoid Bat kidnaps college student Takeshi Hongo to convert and mentally condition him into the Shocker soldier "Hopper". While successfully completing a mission, he meets Shocker's Major Agents, who order him to kill witnesses to their operations, journalist Asuka Midorikawa, and her fiancé Katsuhiko Yano. Amidst an attempt on their lives with assistance from Shocker soldier Spider, Hongo's memories resurface and he fights Spider. However, Yano is killed in the struggle, and Asuka finds Hongo next to his body. Blaming him for Katsuhiko's death, she follows Hongo to figure out why he had changed.

As a result of Hongo's treason, Major Agent Elderly Gentleman has converted the second Hopper and sent him to eliminate their former soldier. While Hongo defeats Spider, Asuka meets a figure who has an uncanny resemblance to Yano, revealing his name as Hayato Ichimonji; instead of killing Hongo, leading to Shocker branding him a traitor as well.

When Bat attempts to kidnap Asuka and turn her into an Inhumanoid, an enraged Ichimonji turns on Shocker and joins forces with Hongo to defeat Bat, Cobra, and Snake at Shocker's base, though Elderly Gentleman and the other Major Agents escape to plan their revenge.

== Cast ==
The Inhumanoids in Kamen Rider: The First are not non-humans as their name would suggest, but rather cyborgs much like the Kamen Riders. The organization's ranks are depicted as having three commanding characters (seen only on screens), as well as several special-class soldiers and unidentified grunts.

- Masaya Kikawada as Takeshi Hongo (本郷 猛, Hongō Takeshi), a college student and motorcycle enthusiasts who was abducted by Shocker and converted into the Inhumanoid Hopper (ホッパー, Hoppā), a special-class soldier charged with the carrying out of covert search-and-destroy missions. He later regained his sense of self and defects from Shocker, instead fighting against them as the Kamen Rider, who later re-dubbed himself as Kamen Rider 1.
- Hassei Takano as Hayato Ichimonji (一文字 隼人, Ichimonji Hayato), a man who competes for Asuka's affection who can transform into Hopper 2 (ホッパー2号, Hoppā Nigō), a special-class soldier in the Shocker ranks charged with hunting and eliminating the traitor, Hopper 1. He later begins fighting against Shocker, alongside Hongo, as Kamen Rider 2.
  - Takano also portrayed Katsuhiko Yano, Asuka's late fiancé, in a dual role.
- Rena Komine as Asuka Midorikawa (緑川 あすか, Midorikawa Asuka), a journalist who initially accused Hongo for the murder of her fiancee and fellow reporter Katsuhiko Yano (矢野 克彦, Yano Katsuhiko) before she fell in love with him upon learning the truth.
- Hiroshi Miyauchi as Tobei Tachibana (立花 藤兵衛, Tachibana Tōbei), the owner of a motorcycle shop where Hongo receives the Cyclone motorcycle.
- Eiji Wentz as Haruhiko Mitamura (三田村 晴彦, Mitamura Haruhiko), an ill teenager who was inducted into Shocker as the Inhumanoid Cobra (コブラ, Kobura), a special class soldier assigned to Bat's squadron, and later works independently alongside his romantic interest, Snake.
- Ryoko Kobayashi as Miyoko Harada (原田 美代子, Harada Miyoko), Haruhiko's romantic interest and a fellow ill teenager who was inducted into Shocker as the Inhumanoid Snake (スネーク, Sunēku), a special class soldier assigned to Bat's squadron, and later works independently alongside Cobra.
- Mayumi Sada as Shocker Staff: Lady (ショッカー幹部・美女, Shokkā Kanbu Bijo), a female commander in the Shocker ranks, she is responsible for the selecting of new Inhumanoid candidates to be inducted into the organization. Like Dr. Shinigami, "Lady" only appears via satellite on screens in the Shocker headquarters, and her physical whereabouts are unknown.
- Issa Hentona as Shocker Staff: Youth (ショッカー幹部・若者, Shokkā Kanbu Wakamono), a young male commander in the Shocker ranks, he is responsible for the organization of missions and troop deployment. Like Dr. Shinagami and "Lady", "Youth" only appears via satellite on screens in the Shocker headquarters, and his physical whereabouts are unknown.
- Itsuji Itao as Taichi Yamanaka (山中 太一, Yamanaka Taichi), a private taxi driver who can transform into the Inhumanoid Spider (スパイダー, Supaidā), a field captain in the Shocker ranks who's responsible for covert assassination missions, and is behind several "mysterious" deaths prior to and during the course of the film.
- Kanji Tsuda as Bat (バット, Batto), a field captain in the Shocker ranks, he is responsible for the "recruitment" (abduction) of potential Inhumanoid candidates. He is the only Shocker soldier depicted as being capable of flight.
- Renji Ishibashi as The Member of the House of Representatives (代議士, Daigishi)
- Hirotarō Honda as The Private Secretary (秘書官, Hishokan)
- Hitomi Nakahodo as Megumi (めぐみ, Megumi)
- Katsumi Shiono as Shocker Combatmen (ショッカー戦闘員, Shokkā Sentōin; Voice)
- Hideyo Amamoto as Shocker Staff: Elderly Gentleman (ショッカー幹部・老紳士, Shokkā Kanbu Rōshinshi), also known by his real name Dr. Shinigami, the mysterious elderly man who is the figurehead of shocker. During the course of the film, he appears only via satellite on screens in the Shocker headquarters. His physical whereabouts are unknown. (Note: Amamoto's appearance in the film is only through various pieces of footage recorded before his death in 2003, including several from the original Kamen Rider series.) This was Amamoto's posthumous role after his death in 2003.
  - Eiji Maruyama provides the voice of Shinagami.

== Returning cast and crew ==
Several actors in this film have appeared in previous Kamen Rider productions. Hiroshi Miyauchi plays Tōbei Tachibana, a character who has appeared in numerous other Kamen Rider shows, acting as a sort of father figure to the Riders. Miyauchi is known for portraying the title character in 1973's Kamen Rider V3. Hassei Takano, who portrays Hayato Ichimonji (Kamen Rider 2) in the film, also starred as Miyuki Tezuka (Kamen Rider Raia) in the 2002 series Kamen Rider Ryuki.

The crew of The First also features many returning names. Director Takao Nagaishi is a longtime tokusatsu director who has helmed several episodes of 2006s Kamen Rider Kabuto. Nagaishi was also an assistant director on the original Kamen Rider series. The film was written by Toshiki Inoue, a popular fixture in anime and tokusatsu screen writing. He has written virtually every theatrical film in the Kamen Rider franchise, as well as all the episodes of Kamen Rider Agito (except for one) and Kamen Rider 555. He also served as a writer on Kamen Rider Kuuga, Kamen Rider Ryuki, Kamen Rider Blade, and Kamen Rider Hibiki. Inoue is the son of the late Masaru Igami, who was the chief writer on the original Kamen Rider series, as well as Kamen Rider V3, Kamen Rider Stronger, and New Kamen Rider.

Hideyo Amamoto, who died in 2003 before the film's release, posthumously reprises his role as Dr. Shinigami through archival footage from the original Kamen Rider series.

== Differences between film and television ==
- The movie has a great deal of elements from the original television series that spread across from the beginning to end, although several of these conflict with the film's timing. Hongo Takeshi originally had to ride his motorcycle at high speeds to power his typhoon belt and transform into his Rider form while Ichimonji Hayato was able to power the Typhoon by arm movements. Although Hongo was able to do the same eventually, the movie version can do it from the beginning.
- The Riders' henshin movement is also different from the actual series. In the series, Hongo and Ichimonji perform a series of stylish hand-waving, then jump into the air to complete the transformation. In this movie, they simply open up their leather jackets (or polo shirt, in one of Ichimonji's cases), revealing the Typhoon Belt (and their body armor), then snap on their helmets and faceplates on their heads to transform. These movements are implemented later in the movie, but are mostly just showy poses that have no connection to their transformation.
- Dr. Shinigami appears from the very beginning of the movie, although in the original series, he appeared after the defeat of Colonel Zol, the first Shocker general.
- The character of Hayato Ichimonji was completely rewritten. In the television series, Ichimonji was a photographer who was kidnapped to become Shocker's new Kamen Rider, although he was rescued by Takeshi Hongo before he could be brainwashed; the two were allies from the beginning. In the film, Ichimonji was originally Katsuhiko Yano, the lover of Asuka Midorikawa. Katsuhiko was killed by Spider, and Hongo/Hopper was framed for it. Katsuhiko's corpse was recovered and turned into a cyborg similar to Hongo. His brain was altered to believe he was a man named Hayato Ichimonji in competition for Asuka's affection. Ichimonji originally served as Hongo's enemy, and later a hesitant ally. He disappears at the end of the movie, leaving his helmet on the road.
- Asuka Midorikawa shares the same last name as one of Hongo's professors who had worked for Shocker, Professor Midorikawa. In the original series, it is Professor Midorikawa who saves Hongo before he can be subjected to brain surgery by providing the distraction to allow Hongo to escape, only to ultimately be murdered by the Spider. Asuka also shares a similarity with Professor Midorikawa's daughter, Ruriko; both had witnessed the death of their respected loved ones (Professor Midorikawa for Ruriko, who was her father, and Katsuhiko Yano for Asuka, who was her fiancé) with their own eyes and originally thought that Hongo was to blame for it. The both of them ultimately found out the truth and forgave Hongo.
- The mysterious Great Leader of Shocker is noticeably absent from the film but made a cameo in the film sequel, Kamen Rider The Next, while Dr Shinigami and the other commanders will not appear.

== Songs ==
Opening theme

- "Let's Go!! Rider Kick" (レッツゴー！！ライダーキック, Rettsu Gō!! Raidā Kikku)
  - Lyrics: Shotaro Ishinomori
  - Composition & Arrangement: Shunsuke Kikuchi
  - Artist: Koichi Fuji

Ending theme

- "Bright! our Future"
  - Lyrics: ISSA
  - Composition: ISSA & YUKINARI
  - Arrangement: YUKINARI & UNAShinji Tanahashi
  - Artist: Da Pump

== Manga adaptation ==
The film received a manga adaptation illustrated by Tatsuya Egawa and was serialized in Tokusatsu Ace. However, it became notorious among Kamen Rider fans for its poor quality. In the 227th episode of the radio show Let's go Manga-chick with Kazuhiko Shimamoto!, Shimamoto, who has done previous works with the Kamen Rider franchise with a Kamen Rider ZO manga and a one-shot manga based on Kamen Rider Black, criticized the author's lack of motivation about the drawings as if they were preliminary drawings with no background, and the loss of composition. He also criticized the manga's editor for approving the low quality illustrations, quoting, "When I get this manuscript, I'm going to turn my desk over and not take it back".

== Sequel ==
A sequel was produced in 2007 called Kamen Rider: The Next. The film included the rider Kamen Rider V3, who had his own show in 1973 and served as a sequel to the original Kamen Rider show.
