= Erika Sawajiri =

Japanese actress, singer, and model (born 1986)

- 沢尻 エリカ
- Sawajiri at the 31st Busan International Film Festival in 2026
- Born: Erika Sawajiri (澤尻 エリカ); April 8, 1986 (age 40); Nerima, Tokyo, Japan
- Other name: Erika
- Occupations: Actress; singer; model
- Years active: 2001–2007, 2010–2020, 2024–present
- Agents: Stardust Promotion (2001–2009); Avex Group (2010–2020)
- Notable credits: Break Through!; 1 Litre no Namida; Shinobi: Heart Under Blade; Taiyo no Uta; Helter Skelter
- Spouse: Tsuyoshi Takashiro (m. 2009; div. 2013)

Erika Sawajiri (Japanese: 沢尻 エリカ, Hepburn: Sawajiri Erika; born April 8, 1986) is a Japanese actress, singer, and model. After debuting as a junior model in 2001, Sawajiri transitioned to acting in 2002 and has starred in Break Through!, Shinobi: Heart Under Blade, and 1 Litre of Tears, for all of which she received several newcomer acting awards. Sawajiri also launched a singing career through the 2006 television drama Taiyō no Uta, where her first commercially-released song of the same name was certified Million by the Recording Industry Association of Japan. She later released solo music under the name Erika.

In 2007, Sawajiri went on hiatus after her public image was affected by her controversial statements and personal relationships. She later returned to acting in 2010 and starred in Helter Skelter, for which she received a Best Leading Actress nomination at the 36th Japan Academy Film Prize.

After Sawajiri was incarcerated from her 2019 arrest for MDMA possession, she resumed her acting career in 2024 with a New National Theatre Tokyo production of A Streetcar Named Desire.

== Early life ==
Erika Sawajiri was born in Nerima, Tokyo to a Japanese father and an Algerian Kabyle mother who was raised in France, and is the youngest of three children. Her father owned 16 racehorses, including Edonokoban (エドノコバン), giving her ample opportunities to engage in horseback riding as a child. Her father disappeared from home when she was nine years old and returned when she was in her third year at junior high school, only to die from cancer that year. Her second eldest brother died in a traffic accident when she was in her first year at high school. Her eldest brother is a former actor. Her mother managed a Mediterranean restaurant where she occasionally helped.

== Career ==
In 1999, Sawajiri passed the Stardust audition after graduating from elementary school. She became part of the idol girl group Angel Eyes and began modeling for junior fashion magazines such as Cutie and Nicola. She later won the grand prize for the 2001 Seikore and became a regular on the BS news program Harajuku Launchers. In 2002, Sawajiri started her career in film as well as extending her modeling career as a gravure idol. Her first film was Mondai no nai Watashitachi.

Sawajiri became one of Fuji TV's Visual Queens in 2002. On the NTV variety show The Yoru mo Hit Parade, she became a regular from April till late June, shortly after leaving the program for the CX news program Chou VIP Fortune no Tobira from mid-June till late August. In November, she was on the CBC variety show Bijou Dokyuu and TBS show B-1. She was cast in the TBS TV drama Hotman. Her most notable role was in 1 Litre of Tears in 2005 when she portrayed a girl with the degenerative disease spinocerebellar degeneration.

Sawajiri first started her music career under the name "Kaoru Amane", the name of her character in her last drama, the TV adaptation of A Song to the Sun. The single went into number 1 in its second and fourth week. It was certified Triple Platinum for cell phone downloads of 750,000. On July 16, 2007, Erika released her debut single "Free", under the name "Erika". The single was immediately ranked on its first day as number one on the Oricon Charts. "Free" was certified Platinum for cell phone downloads of 250,000. Oricon stated that she is the only artist in 39 years to get their first two singles to hit number one since Hiroko Yakushimaru in 1983.

Sawajiri had planned to attend the 12th Busan International Film Festival on October 6, 2007, but she cancelled. Sawajiri and her mother both stated on separate occasions that she would return to Japan and make a comeback as soon as late summer 2009. In 2012, Sawajiri was originally scheduled to star in the live-action film version of Space Battleship Yamato but was replaced by Meisa Kuroki.

In 2013, Sawajiri was nominated for Best Actress in a Leading Role at the 36th Japan Academy Awards for her performance in Helter Skelter.

After Sawajiri's November 2019 arrest, she was replaced in the television drama Kirin ga Kuru with Haruna Kawaguchi. She later stated in January 2020 that she had no plans on continuing her career. In February 2020, Avex ended their contract with her.

== Personal life ==
Sawajiri dated Tsuyoshi Takashiro as early as October 2007. She returned to Japan on March 29, 2008 after nearly three months in London with Takashiro. While in London, she attended a language school and has become fluent enough in English to handle ordinary conversation. On January 20, 2009, Sawajiri married Takashiro at Meiji Shrine in Yoyogi and had registered their marriage on January 7. On December 28, 2013, at a press conference, they announced they had divorced.

=== Drug arrest and trial ===
On November 16, 2019, Sawajiri was arrested on suspicion of possessing MDMA at her home. She reportedly admitted to using drugs for the past 10 years, including marijuana, LSD and cocaine. During her criminal trial on January 31, 2020, Sawajiri pled guilty to the charges and admitted she had been using drugs since she was 19 years old. On February 6, 2020, the Tokyo District Court sentenced her to 18 months in prison, suspended for three years.

== Public image ==
During the premiere for Closed Note on September 29, 2007, Sawajiri, seemingly unhappy with the film, gave terse answers to the reporters. Subsequently, her actions were widely criticized for disrespecting her co-stars and the staff of the film. She issued an apology on her website and during her interview on Super Morning, where she also denied the rumors that she was being suspended by her management. The incident, compounded with Sawajiri's relationship with Takashiro, affected her public image greatly, leading the public to derisively nickname her "Erika-sama". She withdrew her appearance at the Busan International Film Festival because of it. She later abruptly put her acting career on hiatus and Stardust Promotion eventually dropped her as an act in 2009. On September 1, 2010, in an interview with CNN Go, Sawajiri regretted apologizing and claimed that her management had pressured her to do so. Since the incident, the phrase "None, really" (別に, Betsu ni), one of her responses to the reporters, became a viral phenomenon, and she was featured in a Snickers commercial in 2011 parodying herself.

== Filmography ==
=== Films ===
Year	Title	Role	Note	Ref.
2004	Mondai no nai Watashitachi	Maki Shintani		
2005	Break Through!	Lee Kyung-ja		
2005	Ashurajō no Hitomi	Yachi		
2005	Shinobi: Heart Under Blade	Hotarubi		
2006	The Mamiya Brothers	Naomi Honma		
2006	Sugar & Spice	Noriko Watanabe	Lead role	
2006	Ghost Train	Nana	Lead role	
2006	The Angel's Egg	Natsuki Saito		
2006	Tegami	Yumiko Iraishi		
2007	Closed Note	Kae Horii	Lead role	
2012	Helter Skelter	Ririko	Lead role	
2015	Shinjuku Swan	Ageha		
2018	Impossibility Defense	Tada		
2018	The Cat In His Arms	Saori		
2018	Eating Women	Keiko Komugita		
2018	Million Dollar Man	Towako Yasuda		
2019	No Longer Human	Shizuko Ōta		
2026	#Spread	Minami Fukushima		
2026	The Chain of Roses		Lead role	

=== Television ===
Year	Title	Role	Note	Ref.
2003	Hotman	Satsuki Akikawa		
2003	Hitonatsu no Papa e	Satsuki		
2003	NorthPoint Friends	Mami Iwasa		
2004	Sakura Saku made	Naoko Hayashi		
2004	Fuyuzora ni Tsuki wa Kagayaku	Misa Takano		
2004	Cheers: Tenko e no Oenka	Yukari Akikawa		
2004	Mumei			
2005	Aikurushii	Honoka Kizaki		
2005	1 Litre of Tears	Aya Ikeuchi	Lead role	
2005	The Winds of God	Misaki Ohara		
2006	Tenshi no Hashigo	Natsuki Saito		
2006	Taiyō no Uta	Kaoru Amane	Lead role	
2012	L et M: Watashi ga Anata o Ai suru Riyu	Eru and Emu	Lead role	
2012	Akujo ni Tsuite	Tomikoji Kimiko/Suzuki Kimiko	Lead role	
2013	Tokeiya no Musume	Ryo Miyahara	Lead role	
2014	First Class	Chinami Yoshinari	Lead role	
2014	First Class 2	Chinami Yoshinari	Lead role	
2015	Yōkoso, Wagaya e	Asuka Kandori		
2016	Ōoku	Omiyo and Ume	Lead role	
2016	Moumoku no Yoshinori-sensei: Hikari wo Ushinatte Kokoro ga Mieta	Mayumi Arai		
2017	Haha ni Naru	Yui Kashiwazaki	Lead role	
2018	The Vultures	Takako Matsudaira		
2019	Shiroi Kyotō	Keiko Hanamori		

=== Music videos ===
Year	Singer	Title	Remarks
2003	Kishidan	Secret Love Story	-
2003	Zeebra feat. Hiro	Big Big Money	-
2005	Rip Slyme	Hey! Brother	Theme song of Mamiya kyodai
2006	Kaoru Amane	A Song to the Sun (タイヨウのウタ, Taiyō no Uta)	Theme song of A Song to the Sun
2006	Kaoru Amane	Stay With Me	Insert song of A Song to the Sun
2006	Miliyah Kato	I Will	Theme song of Otoshimono
2006	SunSet Swish	Kimi ga Iru kara 君がいるから	Theme song of Tentama
2006	Hitomi Takahashi	Komorebi	Theme song of Tegami
2007	Yui	Love & Truth	Theme song of Closed Note

=== Variety shows ===
Year	Variety Show	Broadcasting Company
2001	Harajuku Ronchazu	-
2002	The Night of Hit Parade	Nihon Television
2002	Super VIP	-
2002–2003	B-1	TBS
2003–2004	Aidoru wa	-
Unknown	Mecha x2 Ikederu!	-

=== DVDs ===
Year	DVD	Publisher
2002	Cava?	Wani Book
2003	D-Splash!	-
2003	Erica	学習研究
2005	Color	For-side.com

== Publications ==
Year	Book title	Publisher
2003	P-chu!	Wani Book
2004	Erika	学習研究
2007	Erika2007	SDP

== Discography ==
=== Singles ===
Title	Year	Peak chart positions	Sales	Album
Title	Year	JPN	Sales	Album
"Free"	2007	1	119,817+	Non-album single
"Destination Nowhere"	2007	7	43,209+	Non-album single
"—" denotes releases that did not chart or were not released in that region.

=== Soundtrack appearances ===
Title	Year	Peak chart positions	Sales	Album
Title	Year	JPN	Sales	Album
"Taiyō no Uta" (as Kaoru Amane)	2007	1	488,000+	Non-album single
"—" denotes releases that did not chart or were not released in that region.

== Awards and accolades ==
Year	Award	Category	Work	Result	Ref.
2005	18th Nikkan Sports Film Awards	Best Newcomer Award	Break Through!	Won	
2005	30th Hochi Film Awards	Best Newcomer Award	Break Through!	Won	
2006	27th Yokohama Film Festival	Best New Talent	Break Through!, Shinobi: Heart Under Blade	Won	
2006	79th Kinema Junpo Award	Best Newcomer Award [Female]	Break Through!, Ashurajō no Hitomi, Shinobi: Heart Under Blade	Won	
2006	29th Japan Academy Film Prize	Best Newcomer Award [Female]	Break Through!	Won	
2006	15th Tokyo Sports Movie Award	Best Newcomer Award	Break Through!, Shinobi: Heart Under Blade	Won	
2006	2006 Elan d'or Awards	Newcomer of the Year	1 Litre of Tears	Won	
2006	43rd Golden Arrow Award	Best Newcomer Award	1 Litre of Tears	Won	
2013	36th Japan Academy Film Prize	Best Leading Actress	Helter Skelter	Nominated	
