= Hiroshi Nishitani =

Japanese film director

- Born: February 12, 1962 (age 63)
- Occupation: Film director

Hiroshi Nishitani (西谷弘) is a Japanese film director.

== Filmography ==
- Star Reformer (2006)
- Suspect X (2008)
- Amalfi: Rewards of the Goddess (2009)
- Andalucia: Revenge of the Goddess (2011)
- Midsummer's Equation (2013)
- Hirugao (2017)
- At the end of the Matinee (2019)
- The Hound of the Baskervilles (2022)
- Silent Parade (2022)
