= Kamen Rider: The Next =

- Theatrical release poster

Japanese name
- Kanji: 仮面ライダー THE NEXT
Transcriptions
- Revised Hepburn: Kamen Raidā Za Nekusuto
- Directed by: Ryuta Tasaki
- Screenplay by: Toshiki Inoue
- Based on: Kamen Rider and Kamen Rider V3 by Shotaro Ishinomori
- Produced by: Kazuo Katō; Shinichirō Shirakura; Naomi Takebe; Kōichi Yada
- Starring: Masaya Kikawada; Hassei Takano; Kazuki Kato; Miku Ishida; Erika Mori; Tomorowo Taguchi; Rie Mashiko
- Cinematography: Issei Tanaka
- Edited by: Hideaki Ōhata
- Music by: Goro Yasukawa
- Production companies: Toei Company; Toei Channel; Toei Advertising; Toei Video
- Distributed by: Toei Company, Ltd.
- Release date: October 27, 2007
- Running time: 93 minutes
- Country: Japan
- Language: Japanese

Kamen Rider: The Next (仮面ライダー THE NEXT, Kamen Raidā Za Nekusuto; Masked Rider: The Next) is a 2007 Japanese superhero film directed by Ryuta Tasaki and written by Toshiki Inoue. The film was released on October 27, 2007. The film borrows elements from the Kamen Rider V3 television series and is a sequel to the Kamen Rider: The First movie (which was a film adaptation of the original Kamen Rider series).

Actor Kazuki Kato, who had previously portrayed Daisuke Kazama/Kamen Rider Drake in Kamen Rider Kabuto, portrayed Shiro Kazami/Kamen Rider V3. Both Masaya Kikawada and Hassei Takano reprise their roles as Takeshi Hongo/Kamen Rider 1 and Hayato Ichimonji/Kamen Rider 2, respectively. It was given a PG-12 rating for its brief nudity and violence.

== Plot ==
Two years after the events of Kamen Rider the First, a strange series of bizarre and gruesome murders occur, all connected to pop star Chiharu's song "Platinum Smile". Meanwhile, Takeshi Hongo has become a high school science teacher. One student, in particular, catches his eye, a troubled girl named Kotomi Kikuma, who was best friends with Chiharu. When she and Hongo find a dying "Chiharu", they discover she is an imposter before the Shocker Inhumanoid Chainsaw Lizard arrives with six Shocker Riders to eliminate Hongo, forcing him to reveal himself as Kamen Rider 1 to Kotomi before escaping his hunters. Meanwhile, Hayato Ichimonji is slowly weakening due to his body rejecting the cybernetic enhancements that turned him into Kamen Rider 2.

The next day, Hongo saves Kotomi from a group of punks with his superhuman abilities, scaring nearby students. She asks for his help in finding Chiharu, which he accepts. They begin their investigation by locating Chiharu's older brother Shiro Kazami, the former president of the rising IT enterprise ExaStream, whose staff disappeared two months prior. Making their way to Kazami's holiday home, Hongo and Kotomi discover he is in league with Shocker. As Hongo fights Chainsaw Lizard and the Shocker Riders, Kazami joins the fray as the Shocker Inhumanoid "V3". Following a high-speed chase, V3 and the Shocker Riders defeat Hongo, but Ichimonji arrives to help Hongo escape. After discovering one of his sister's imposters, Kazami finds Hongo and Ichimonji again and reveals he was the sole survivor of a Shocker experiment involving nanobots designed to convert all humans in Japan into cyborgs that claimed his staff. The three Riders later learn Kotomi found another Chiharu imposter, who reveals the real one was disfigured by her rivals and committed suicide. Refusing to accept this, Chiharu's record label forced the girls responsible to become her stand-ins so they could release "Platinum Smile". The latest imposter runs off, but she, Chiharu's manager, and the record dealer are later killed by Chiharu's ghost.

After Kazami reveals to Hongo that Shocker's foreign branch brought a shipment of nanobots to spread across the nation, Hongo and Ichimonji intercept the convoy and battle the operation's mastermind, Scissors Jaguar. They are initially overwhelmed until Kazami joins them. Hongo and Ichimonji kill Scissors Jaguar while V3 destroys Chainsaw Lizard and the nanobots before encountering Chiharu, who had been exposed to, revived, and mutated by the nanobots into a monster. She pleads for him to end her suffering, which he reluctantly agrees to. With Chiharu's death, the "Platinum Smile" incidents seemingly end, Ichimonji leaves to spend his final moments at his favorite Ginza bar, Kazami decides to start a new life, and Hongo quits his job due to complaints about his saving Kotomi.

A post-credits scene set in a pachinko bar reveals that the "Platinum Smile" curse may not have truly ended with Chiharu claiming another victim.

== Cast ==
- Masaya Kikawada as Takeshi Hongo
- Hassei Takano as Hayato Ichimonji
- Kazuki Kato as Shiro Kazami
- Miku Ishida as Kotomi Kikuma
- Erika Mori as Chiharu Kazami Naoko Totsuka, Yukari Taniguchi,
- Gorō Naya as The Great Leader of Shocker (voice)
- Tomorowo Taguchi as Scissors Jaguar
- Rie Mashiko as Chainsaw Lizard
- Shinji Rokkaku as Yamazaki
- Takako Miki As Club Holder Young Woman
- Kyusaku Shimada as Shindou
- Yôsuke Saitô as Vice-Principal
- Katsumi Shiono as Shocker Combatmen/Shocker Riders (voice)

== Songs ==
Theme song

- "Chosen Soldier"
  - Lyrics & Artist: ISSA
  - Composition: Daisuke Imai (今井 大介, Imai Daisuke)

Insert song

- "Platinum Smile"
  - Lyrics & Artist: Riyu Kosaka
  - Composition: LOVE+HATE
