= Yurie Midori =

Japanese actress and gravure idol (born 1991)

- 緑 友利恵
- Born: 名引 友利恵; April 16, 1991 (age 35); Osaka Prefecture, Japan
- Other name: Yurie
- Occupations: Actress, Gravure idol
- Years active: 2005 -
- Website: Official profile

Yurie Midori (緑 友利恵, Midori Yurie; born April 16, 1991, in Osaka Prefecture, Japan) is a Japanese actress and gravure idol who has appeared in a number of feature films and television series. She is affiliated with Horipro. In 2017 she announced that she had changed her name and would now be known mononymously as Yurie (友利恵). Her real name is Yurie Nabiki (名引 友利恵, Nabiki Yurie).

== Biography ==
In 2005, Midori was awarded the Grand Prix at the 30th Horipro Tarento Scout Caravan Memorial Audition 2005. The same year in May, Midori's acting debut was in GyaO's internet drama, Shojo ni wa Mukanai Shokugyo.

On April 3, 2006, her gravure debut was on the cover of Young Magazine. The following year, Midori was selected for Nippon Telegenic 2007.

In addition to her acting career, she has become a certified candle artist and on January 11, 2022 launched an online business, CandLe MATE, selling artisan candles.

== Filmography ==
=== TV series ===
Year	Title	Role	Network	Other notes
2007	Ballad of a Shinigami	Fuyuko Soma	TV Tokyo	Episode 3
2008	Tadashii Ouji no Tsukuri Kata	Nami Yuki	TV Tokyo	
2009	Kamen Rider Decade	Yuri Tomoda	TV Asahi	Episodes 10 and 11
2009	Tenchijin	Osada	NHK	Episode 41
2011	Kamen Rider OOO	Suzuka Mihara	TV Asahi	Episode 31
2012	Lucky Seven	Mana Matsuura	Fuji TV	Episode 1

=== Films ===
Year	Title	Role	Other notes
2008	Someday's Dreamers	Honomi Asagi	
2010	Hanbun no Tsuki ga Noboru Sora	Miyuki Mizutani	
2011	Into the White Night	Eriko Kawashima	
2011	Gantz	Mako Yamamoto	
2012	We Were There	Mizuguchi	
2014	Hot Road	Kaori	
