= Masaya Kikawada =

Japanese actor (born 1980)

- 黄川田 雅哉
- Born: June 1, 1980 (age 45); Niiza, Saitama
- Other names: Masaya Kikawada (黄川田 将也, Kikawada Masaya) (former stage name)
- Occupation: Actor
- Years active: 1999–present
- Agent: Toyota Office
- Notable credit(s): Battle Royale II; Pretty Guardian Sailor Moon; Kamen Rider The First; Kamen Rider The Next
- Website: https://www.toyotaoffice.jp/masayakikawada/

Masaya Kikawada (黄川田 雅哉, Kikawada Masaya; born June 1, 1980) is a Japanese actor. His most prominent role has been as Takeshi Hongo in the film Kamen Rider The First and its sequel Kamen Rider The Next. He was also in Pretty Guardian Sailor Moon as Sailor Jupiter's love interest Motoki Furuhata, as well as the sequel to Battle Royale, Battle Royale 2: Requiem. He also was Yousuke the disc jockey in the movie Dear Friends, where he was reunited with Keiko Kitagawa. Furthermore, he was in the Japanese drama My Boss my Hero playing Sakaki Mikio, younger brother to the main character.

== Filmography ==
=== Film ===
- Tomie: Re-birth (2001), Shun'ichi Hosoda
- Battle Royale 2: Requiem (2003), Shintaro Makimura
- Kamen Rider The First (2005), Takeshi Hongo
- My Boss My Hero (2006), Sakaki Mikio
- Kamen Rider The Next (2007), Takeshi Hongo
- Dear Friends (2007), Yousuke the disc jockey
- Kyō Kara Hitman (2009), Dual
- Jossy's (2014)
- Hakodate Coffee (2016), Eiji
- Leaving the Scene (2019)
- Seppuku: The Sun Goes Down (2025)
- Service Oath (2026)

=== Series ===
- Toshiie and Matsu (2002), Hosokawa Tadaoki
- Pretty Guardian Sailor Moon (2004), Motoki Furuhata
- Tenchijin (2009), Honda Masashige
- Strangers 6 (2012)
- Yae's Sakura (2013), Tokio Yokoi
- Ultraman X (2015), Alien Gold "tE-rU"
- Idol x Warrior Miracle Tunes! (2017), Seitarō
- Kishiryu Sentai Ryusoulger (2019), Master Red
- Ultraman Decker (2022), Taiji Murahoshi
