= Sugar and Spice (2006 film) =

Sugar & spice: Fūmi zekka
- Film poster
- Directed by: Isamu Nakae
- Screenplay by: Fumie Mizuhashi
- Based on: Fūmi zekka by Amy Yamada
- Produced by: Toru Ota; Morio Amagi; Hirotsugu Usui
- Starring: Yūya Yagira; Erika Sawajiri; Mari Natsuki; Yo Oizumi; Bolin Chen
- Cinematography: Toyoshi Tsuda
- Edited by: Hiroshi Matsuo
- Music by: Ryo Yoshimata
- Distributed by: Toho
- Release date: September 16, 2006 (Japan)
- Running time: 125 minutes
- Country: Japan
- Language: Japanese

Sugar and Spice (Japanese: シュガー＆スパイス 風味絶佳, Hepburn: Shugā & supaisu: Fūmi zekka) is a 2006 Japanese romance film directed by Isamu Nakae and starring Yūya Yagira and Erika Sawajiri. The film features the song "Lyla" performed by Oasis.

== Plot ==
Recently graduated from high school, 17-year-old Shiro (Yūya Yagira) decides to put off college and work at a gas station instead. Shy and introspective, Shiro understands he is at a turning point of his life, but is unsure of what lies ahead. Though his parents disapprove of his decision, he has the support of his flower child grandmother (Natsuki Mari) who declares that a gas station is a romantic place for life's drifters. Surely enough, soon a new co-worker, college student Noriko (Erika Sawajiri), drifts into Shiro's life. He falls headfirst into a bittersweet first love that ushers him into the world of adulthood.

== Cast ==
- Yūya Yagira - Shiro Yamashita
- Erika Sawajiri - Noriko Watanabe
- Mari Natsuki - Grandma
- Chen Bolin - Mike
- Yo Oizumi - Gas Station Guy
- Ryō Kimura as Makkī
- Gaku Hamada as Naoki
- Mayuko Iwasa as Yoko
- Yū Aoi (cameo)

== Release ==
Sugar and Spice was released theatrically in Japan on 16 September 2006 under the sub-title What little girls are made of. It was later released on DVD in March 2007 with English subtitles.

== Reception ==
Critic Kevin Ma calls the film a "bittersweet romance that's more bitter than sweet" but surprisingly involving for a two-hour film, concluding that it is "an appealing film with photogenic stars, but a story that's hard to relate to."
