= Hero (2007 film) =

- Film poster
- Directed by: Masayuki Suzuki
- Written by: Yasushi Fukuda
- Produced by: Takashi Ishihara; Yoshimasa Genozono; Tadashi Makino; Toru Miyazawa; Kazutoshi Wadakura
- Starring: Takuya Kimura; Takako Matsu
- Release date: September 8, 2007
- Running time: 130 minutes
- Country: Japan
- Language: Japanese
- Box office: ¥8.15 billion (Japan) $2.98 million (overseas)

Hero is a 2007 Japanese feature film based on the 2001 Japanese TV series of the same name. The original series spawned a 2-hour TV special in 2006 which followed the main character, Kuryu, five years later. That special sets up the lead-in for the 2007 feature film.

The all-star cast of this film includes the original cast from the TV series; cameos by Ayase Haruka and Nakai Kiichi (from the 2006 special), as well as guests Koshiro Matsumoto, Tamori, and special guest, Korean star Lee Byung-hun.

This film mainly portrays the events that occurs in the courtroom, which was rarely done in the TV series.

The region-2 DVD (Korean subtitles version also available) was released on March 8, 2008 by Pony Canyon.

A sequel feature film, also titled Hero, was released in theatres in July 2015. The film follows Kuryu and the cast of the 2014 TV Series and features the return of Amamiya, who was inexplicably absent from the second TV series.

== Plot ==
The film begins six years after Kuryu Kohei was transferred to Ishigaki Island (in the TV series finale). We learn in the interim that he has since been transferred to Sapporo and then to a brief tenure in Yamaguchi Prefecture (the events of the 2006 Hero TV Special). Kuryu Kohei returns to the same Tokyo District Prosecutors Office from the TV series and reunites with his old workmates. The events of the film takes him to Korea, wraps up plot threads from the TV special and allows Amamiya and Kuryu to rekindle their relationship which had been in limbo since their date at the 2002 World Cup (5 years).

Kuryu prosecutes a fatal hit and run case, but runs into obstruction and interference as the chief suspect is a witness to a high profile political case. As such, Kuryu must face an elite, powerful lawyer, played by Koshiro Matsumoto. Proving his suspect guilty risks collapsing the national case. However, as always, Kuryu only cares about finding the truth and justice about his case and goes to great lengths (even travelling to Korea) to find it. While the TV episodes focused mostly on Kuryu's pre-trial investigative abilities, the film showcases Kuryu's legal skills within the courtroom, leaving Amamiya and the other co-workers to do much of the legwork.

== Cast ==
- Takuya Kimura as Kohei Kuryu
- Takako Matsu as Maiko Amamiya
- Hiroshi Abe as Mitsugu Shibayama
- Nene Otsuka as Misuzu Nakamura
- Takuzo Kadono as Yutaka Ushimaru
- Masanobu Katsumura as Tatsuo Egami
- Fumiyo Kohinata as Takayuki Suetsugu
- Norito Yashima as Kenji Endo
- Kiyoshi Kodama as Toshimitsu Nabeshima
- Koshiro Matsumoto as Issei Gamo
- Lee Byung-hun as Kang Min-woo
- Haruka Ayase as Ririko Izumitani
- Kiichi Nakai as Akihiko Takida
- Tamori as Lower House Member Renzaburo Hanaoka
- Ittoku Kishibe as Judge Kaoru Kayama

== Production notes ==
The Spanish translation displayed on the electronic translator in the final scene of the film is "約束します。離しません。" or "I promise never to leave you / let you go"

== Reception ==
It was the third highest grossing film in Japan of 2007 with ¥8.15 billion ($80.4 million) and was number one for seven successive weeks, a record only matched by another Japanese live action film in 2014, The Eternal Zero. Overseas, the film grossed $2,979,353 in South Korea, Taiwan and Hong Kong.
