= Sakuragaokachō, Shibuya =

District in Shibuya, Tokyo, Japan

Sakuragaokachō 桜丘町
- Neighborhood in Shibuya
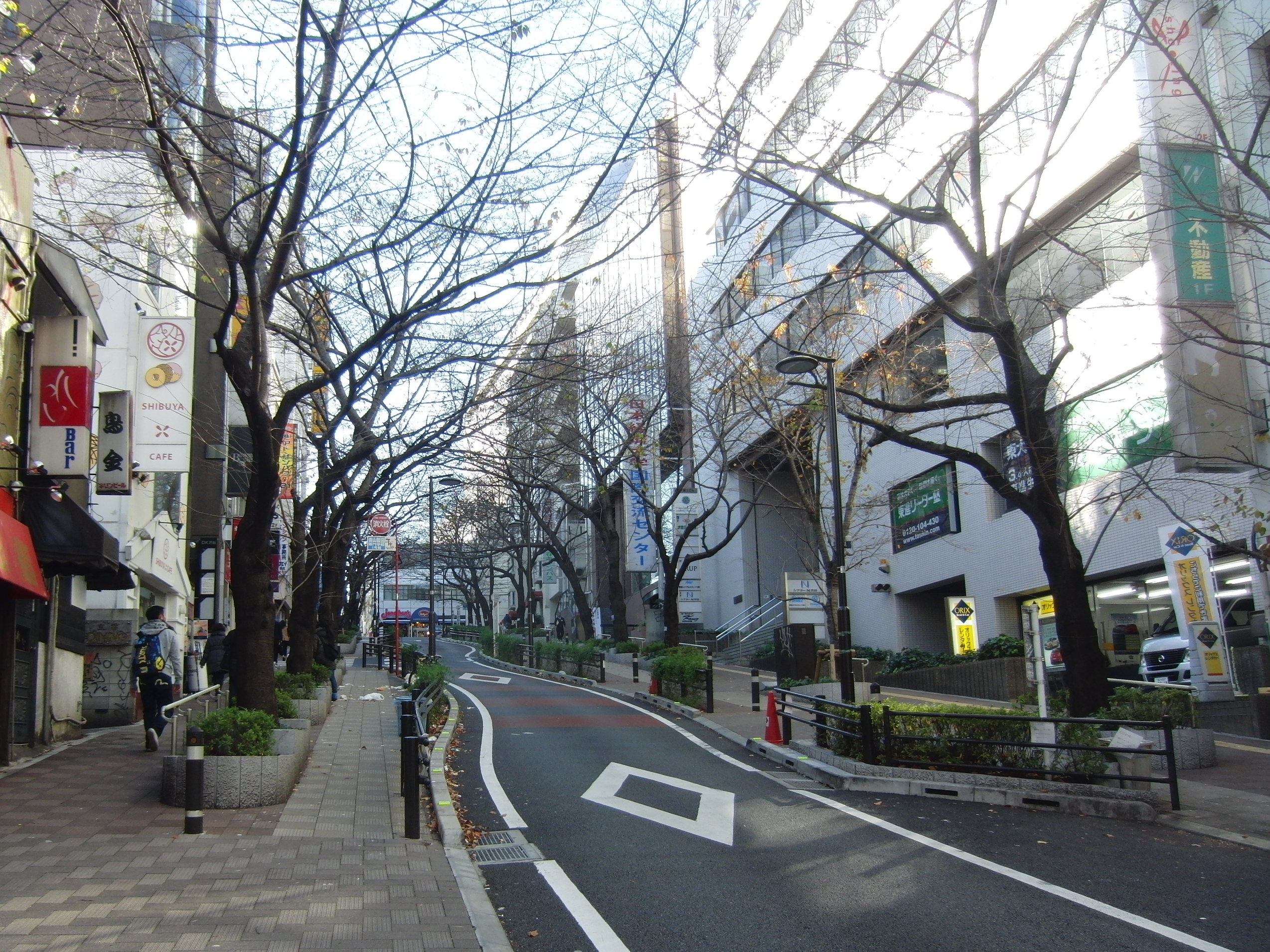
- Interactive map of Sakuragaokachō
- Country: Japan
- Prefecture: Tokyo
- Special ward: Shibuya

Population (1 October 2020)
  - Total: 1,818
- Time zone: UTC+09:00
- ZIP code: 150-0031
- Telephone area code: 03

Sakuragaokachō (桜丘町) is a district of Shibuya, Tokyo, Japan.

As of October 2020, the population of this district is 1,818. The postal code for Sakuragaokachō is 150–0031.

Cerulean Tower and the Shibuya campus of the Japan University of Economics are located here.

== Education ==
Shibuya Board of Education operates public elementary and junior high schools.

All of Sakuragaokachō is zoned to Jinnan Elementary School (神南小学校), and Shoto Junior High School (松濤中学校).
