= Pieta in the Toilet =

- Poster

Japanese name
- Kanji: トイレのピエタ
Transcriptions
- Revised Hepburn: Toire no Pieta
- Directed by: Daishi Matsunaga
- Screenplay by: Daishi Matsunaga
- Story by: Osamu Tezuka
- Produced by: Shinji Ogawa; Morio Amagi
- Starring: Yojiro Noda; Hana Sugisaki
- Cinematography: Yoshihiro Ikeuchi
- Edited by: Ryūji Miyajima
- Music by: Masamichi Shigeno
- Production companies: Cine Bazar; Iwamoto Metal Co.; Voque Ting; Yumebanchi; Bridgehead; Space Shower TV
- Distributed by: Shochiku
- Release date: June 6, 2015 (Japan)
- Running time: 120 minutes
- Country: Japan
- Language: Japanese

Pieta in the Toilet (Japanese: トイレのピエタ, Hepburn: Toire no Pieta) is a 2015 Japanese youth drama film written and directed by Daishi Matsunaga. It was released in Japan on June 6, 2015.

== Cast ==
- Yojiro Noda as Hiro Sonoda
- Hana Sugisaki

== Reception ==
On Film Business Asia, Derek Elley gave the film a 6 out of 10, calling it an "interesting drama of an offbeat friendship between a dying artist and a schoolgirl".
