= Hatsune Matsushima =

Japanese model and actress

- 松嶋初音
- Born: Noriko Matsushima; November 13, 1987 (age 38); Tokyo, Japan
- Occupations: talent; gravure model; actress
- Years active: 2004-present
- Height: 158 cm (5 ft 2 in)

Hatsune Matsushima (松嶋初音, Matsushima Hatsune; born November 13, 1987) is a Japanese gravure model, talent and actress affiliated with Harmony Promotion. She was born in Tokyo, Japan. Her real name is Noriko Matsushima, and she goes by the nickname Hachu. She has starred in a number of TV dramas, films, and internet productions. She also co-authored a book. On November 15, she announced her first pregnancy.

== Biography ==
=== History ===
In 2004, Matsushima started her career as a gravure idol while a high school student when she won the 2004 Miss Magazine (ミスマガジン) Special Jury Prize. From the start of her career was a gravure idol, she has gone by the nickname Hachu.

During October, 2005, Matsushima starred in the Tokyo-based television show "Turnout! Miniskirt Police" (出動!ミニスカポリス 全国版) as part of the 13th generation police.

In June, 2006, Matsushima played Izumu in the late-night drama "Akihabara@DEEP". Due to her role in that drama as such a strange, but loveable, character, even now she is regular topic of discussion.

After the dissolution of her prior agency, Anthem, in September, 2008, she signed on with Harmony Promotion (ハーモニープロモーション).

More recently she has started to shift away from being an idol, and has appeared on variety shows and internet programs.

=== Career and life ===
Her grandmother who lives in Sendai, Miyagi practices a form of Shamanism called Itako where it is believed followers can speak with the dead and can remove evil spirits from one's mind and body. Matsushima believes she also has these same abilities.

At the start of her career, rumors started circulating near where she rode her bike to school that there was a beautiful high school girl in the area. People would ride their bikes around the same time as her to try and see her. Hoping to make the rumors stop and make people think the rumors were exaggerated, her principal brought Matsushima in front of everyone so they could see her for themselves.

Matsushima is a former member of the Miss Magazine (ミスマガジン) Women's Football Team.

During the commentary of the drama Akihabara@DEEP she broke the news that her real name is Noriko Matsushima. She later confirmed the story on her blog.

She first started to mention that she wanted to move away from being a gravure idol on the December 24, 2006 broadcast of "Drive A Go! Go!" (ドライブ A GO!GO!).

While doing handstands and dives at the June 18, 2007 Shibuya O-crest Girls-RockPop stadium vol.17, she was warned about some nude otakus who were nearby.

Matsushima participated in the Nico Nico Douga's International Smiling Film Festival (国際ニコニコ映画祭) as a judge.

At one point Matsushima was examined for Moyamoya disease like symptoms, including disturbance of blood flow to the brain, headaches and fainting. No signs of Moyamoya disease was discovered, however she regularly sees a doctor to monitor her condition.

She likes video games and has been featured in video game magazines like Famitsu. She has used her blog to recruit Xbox friends to play online with.

On February 3, 2010, Matushima appeared in the television show "Toreazu Namanaka" where she received an e-mail from the musical day guest named "alan." Alan asked her to make a funny face. She made a face mimicking Anpanman.

In the song "Dance Sanma Court" (踊るさんま御殿), Matsushima admitted to hitting a woman with an object in the head, making her bleed, after being in a childish argument with her.

== Filmography ==
Television
Year	Film	Role	Notes
2005	Chakushin Ari	Tomoko	
2005	Anfea	Tatsui Madoka	
2006	Akihabara@DEEP	Izumu	
	Kayoubi Dorama Goorudo		
2007	Kirakira Kenshuui	Kaki Haruyama	
2007	Papa to Musume Shichinichikan		
2008	Tadashii Ouko no Tsukurikata	Haruka Shinagawa	
2008	Doyou Waido Gekijou	Megumi Kimura	
2008	Manga Kissa Toshi Densetsu Norui no Mannasan	Sayaka	
2008	Tsujitsuma		
2008	Wairudo sutoroberî (Wild Strawberry)	Guest role	

Films
Year	Film	Role	Notes
2007	Dear Friends	Emi	
2008	Akumu Tantei 2	Akiko	
2009	Teke Teke 2		

== Books ==
=== Paperback ===
Hatsune Kaidan Hatsune to Chisana Ojisan no Koto (Co-authored with Hirotsu Kihara, August 10, 2008, Kadokawa Shoden
