= Yudai Tatsumi =

Japanese actor (born 1986)

- 辰巳 雄大
- Born: 25 November 1986 (age 39); Tokyo, Japan
- Occupation: Actor
- Years active: 1998–
- Agent: Johnny & Associates
- Height: 172 cm (5 ft 8 in)

Yudai Tatsumi (辰巳 雄大, Tatsumi Yūdai; born 25 November 1986 in Tokyo) is a Japanese actor who is a member of the Johnny's Jr. unit Four-Yū. He is represented with Johnny & Associates.

== Biography ==
In 1998, Tatsumi entered Johnny & Associates when he was in elementary school 6th grade. He and Yusuke Matsuzaki participated in the same audition. In 1999, Tatsumi performed his stage debut as the young Koichi in the Koichi Domoto-starring stage Show Geki '99 Mask. He acted as a member of the Johnny's Jr. internal unit M.A.D. As a member of Four-Yū from April 2011, Tatsumi mainly works on the stage.

== Filmography ==
=== Stage ===
Run	Title	Role	Location	Notes	Ref.
6–31 Jan 1999	Show Geki '99 Mask	Yuki (young)	Nissay Theatre		
1–27 Aug 2000	Musical Big –Yume wa kanau–	Josh (young)	Tokyo International Forum Hall C	Dual lead	
26–29 May/1–5 Jun 2016	Soreiyu	Takashi Sakuragi	Umeda Arts Theater Sister Drama City/Zepp Blue Theater Roppongi		
6–11/14, 15/19–23 Apr 2017	Soreiyu	Takashi Sakuragi	Sunshine Theatre/Kitakyushu Performing Arts Center Middle Theater/Shin Kobe Oriental Theater		

=== TV dramas ===
Date	Title	Role	Network	Notes	Ref.
1999	Kowai Nichiyōbi: Shin Fumi		NTV	Episode 6	
2000	Kowai Nichiyōbi: 2000		NTV	Episode 14	
2000	Namida o fuite	Kota Fuchigami	CX		
2001	Shōnen Tire	Akira	CX	"Gypsy"	
2011	Binan desu ne	Lesson student	TBS		
2012	Piece – Kanojo no Kioku	Koji Sakata	NTV		
19, 26 Jun 2017	Kizoku Tantei	Yoshihisa Gudo	CX	Episode 10 and Final Episode	
