= Taiyō no Uta (song) =

Single by Kaoru Amane
- A-side: "Taiyō no Uta"
- B-side: "Stay with Me"
- Released: August 30, 2006
- Genre: J-pop
- Length: 4:49
- Label: Sony Music Records
- Songwriter: Maika Shiratori
- Producer: Yoshio Konno

Erika Sawajiri singles chronology
"Taiyō no Uta" (2006)

Audio sample
- "Taiyō no Uta": file; help

"Taiyō no Uta" (タイヨウのうた; lit. "A Song to the Sun") is a song recorded by Erika Sawajiri under the name Kaoru Amane. It was released as an insert song for Taiyō no Uta, a 2006 television drama adaptation of the film of the same name, of which Sawajiri starred as the aforementioned character. It was released through Sony Music Records on August 30, 2006. The single broke several records, scoring the best first-week sales of a debut single by a female solo artist, and becoming the first debut single by an actress in twelve years to top the Oricon Singles Chart, since Yuki Uchida's debut with "Tenca o Torō! (Uchida no Yabō)" (1994).

== Background ==
"Taiyō no Uta" was written by Japanese singer-songwriter and daughter of Emiko Shiratori, Maika Shiratori. The song was arranged by Junji Yayoshi and produced by Yoshio Konno. It is composed in the key of G major and set to a tempo of 84 beats per minute. Sawajiri's vocals span from G_{3} to C_{5}. Lyrically, the song describes a woman who gains hope for the future through falling in love. Shiratori used the plot of the series as inspiration for the lyrics. In 2007, she self-covered the song for her fourth studio album Hikousen.

== Chart performance ==
"Taiyō no Uta" debuted at number 2 on the Oricon Singles Chart with 150,000 copies sold, held out of the top spot by GYM's "Fever to Future". The song broke and updated several records upon its release. It recorded the best first-week sales of a debut single by a female solo artist ever, breaking Yuki Uchida's record of 131,000 copies, and became the first debut single by an actress to reach the top three in over nine years, since Ryōko Hirosue with the double A-side single "Maji de Koisuru Gobyō Mae" / "Tomadoi" (1997), which also debuted at number 2. It also marked the first top three entry by a female solo artist credited under the name of a fictional character in just shy of six years, since Miho Kanno debuted at number 3 as Shuka Hasui (蓮井朱夏) with the song "Zoo (Ai o Kudasai)".

"Taiyō no Uta" reached the top of the Oricon Singles Chart on its second week, becoming the first debut single by an actress in over eleven years, since Uchida's "Tenca o Torō! (Uchida no Yabō)", to reach the number-one position. It also became the first debut single by an actress to chart in the top three for two consecutive weeks in over sixteen years, since Rie Miyazawa's "Dream Rush" (1989). Finally, it became the first single released under the pseudonym of a fictional character, since Yui Asaka, Yuka Onishi and Yuma Nakamura's joint release as the Kazama Sisters from the Sukeban Deka III series, "Remember" (1987), to top the Oricon Singles Chart in close to nineteen years, as well as the second single overall to achieve the feat.

On its third week, "Taiyō no Uta" slid back down to number 2, dethroned by Glay's "Natsuoto" / "Hen na Yume (Thousand Dreams)", and became the first debut single by a female solo artist to chart in the top three for three consecutive weeks. The following week, the single regained the top spot, marking the first time a single had topped the Oricon Singles Chart for a second time after its first peak in over sixteen years, since the Japanese band Tama's single "Sayonara Jinrui" / "Ranchiu" and becoming only the second debut single by a female solo artist to do so, other than Akiko Kobayashi's "Koi ni Ochite (Fall in Love)" (1985). The single went on to spend three more weeks in the top ten, before falling out of the top twenty two weeks later.

"Taiyō no Uta" charted for twenty-four weeks on the Oricon Singles Chart, selling a reported total of 489,000 copies during its run. The single ranked at number 10 on the year-end chart and was the best-selling single by a female artist of 2006.

== Track listing ==
No.	Title	Writer(s)	Arranger(s)	Length
1.	"Taiyō no Uta" (タイヨウのうた, "A Song to the Sun")	Maika Shiratori	Junji Yayoshi	4:49
2.	"Stay With Me"	Mariko Nagai; Cozzi	Cozzi	4:13
3.	"Wish" (Original Instrumental)	Daisuke Kawaguchi	Kawaguchi	3:10
Total length:				12:12

First press edition CD
No.	Title	Writer(s)	Arranger(s)	Length
3.	"Taiyō no Uta" (Acoustic Version)	Shiratori	Yayoshi	4:33
4.	"Stay With Me" (Acoustic Version)	Nagai; Cozzi	Cozzi	4:01
5.	"Wish" (Original Instrumental)	Kawaguchi	Kawaguchi	3:08
6.	"Taiyō no Uta" (Instrumental)	Shiratori	Yayoshi	4:50
7.	"Stay With Me" (Instrumental)	Cozzi	Cozzi	4:14
Total length:				29:48

First press edition DVD
No.	Title	Director(s)	Length
1.	"Taiyō no Uta" (Video Clip)	Takahiro Miki

== Charts ==
Chart (2006)	Peak position
Japan Weekly Singles (Oricon)	1
Japan Monthly Singles (Oricon)	1
Japan Yearly Singles (Oricon)	10

== Certifications ==
Region	Certification	Certified units/sales
Japan (RIAJ) Physical single	2× Platinum	500,000^{^}
Japan (RIAJ) Digital	3× Platinum	750,000^{*}
Japan (RIAJ) Ringtone	Million	1,000,000^{*}
^{*} Sales figures based on certification alone.^{^} Shipments figures based on certification alone.

== See also ==
- List of best-selling singles in Japan
- List of Oricon number-one singles
