= Amalfi: Rewards of the Goddess =

- Film poster
- Directed by: Hiroshi Nishitani
- Screenplay by: Hiroshi Nishitani; Yuichi Shinpo
- Story by: Yuichi Shinpo
- Produced by: Hirotsugu Usui; Kazutoshi Wadakura
- Starring: Yūji Oda; Yūki Amami; Erika Toda; Rocco Papaleo; Kōichi Satō
- Cinematography: Hideo Yamamoto
- Edited by: Masaaki Yamamoto
- Music by: Yugo Kanno
- Distributed by: Toho
- Release date: July 18, 2009 (Japan)
- Running time: 125 minutes
- Country: Japan
- Languages: Japanese; Italian; English
- Box office: ¥3.65 billion (Japan) $169,650 (overseas)

Amalfi: Rewards of the Goddess (Japanese: アマルフィ 女神の報酬, Hepburn: Amarufi: Megami no hōshū) is a 2009 Japanese film directed by Hiroshi Nishitani. It was followed by the TV drama sequel The Diplomat Kosaku Kuroda and the film sequel Andalucia: Revenge of the Goddess.

== Premise ==
Diplomat Kōsaku Kuroda arrives in Italy to oversee security for Foreign Minister Wataru Kawagoe against a terrorist threat. However, during the Christmas holidays in Rome, Kuroda is drawn into the kidnapping of a young Japanese girl. After failed negotiations, he realizes the abduction is a cover for a larger plot against the Japanese government.

== Cast ==
- Yūji Oda as Kōsaku Kuroda
- Yūki Amami as Saeko Yagami
- Kōichi Satō as Masaki Fujii
- Erika Toda as Kanae Adachi
- Rocco Papaleo as inspector Bartolini
- Nene Otsuka as Yoshimi Haba
- Akira Onodera as Kiyofumi Kikuhara
- Shirō Sano as Michio Nishino
- Mitsuru Hirata as Wataru Kawagoe
- Masaharu Fukuyama (special appearance) as Shōgo Saeki
- Kiichi Nakai as the voice of Hiroshi Kataoka
- Sarah Brightman herself

== Production ==
A special production by Fuji TV to celebrate its 50th anniversary, Amalfi was the first Japanese movie to be shot entirely in Italy. Filming took place in Rome, Caserta, and the Amalfi coast.

== Reception ==
The film received negative reviews from critics but performed well at the box office. It was the ninth highest-grossing film in Japan in 2009.
