= Airi Toriyama =

Japanese actress and singer

Airi Toriyama 通山 愛里
- Born: June 16, 1989 (age 37); Miyazaki Prefecture, Japan
- Occupations: Actress, singer
- Years active: 2003–

Airi Toriyama (通山 愛里, Tōriyama Airi; born June 16, 1989, in Miyazaki Prefecture, Japan) is a Japanese actress and singer who is affiliated with Sony Music Entertainment Japan through Cast Corporation, until October 8, 2009.

== Filmography ==
=== TV series ===
Year	Title	Role	Network	Other notes
2008	Tadashii Ouji no Tsukuri Kata	Misaki Koshino	TV Tokyo	

=== Films ===
Year	Title	Role	Other notes
2006	Midnight Sun	Misaki Matsumae	
2007	Dear Friends	Hiroko	
2007	Gakkō no Kaidan	Yuko Kokonoe	
