= Tsuyoshi Takashiro =

Japanese DJ, filmmaker, and writer (born 1964)

Tsuyoshi Takashiro (高城剛)
- Born: August 18, 1964 (age 61); Tokyo, Japan
- Spouse: Erika Sawajiri (m. 2009; div. 2013)

Tsuyoshi Takashiro (高城 剛, Takashiro Tsuyoshi) is a Japanese DJ, filmmaker, and writer.

== Biography ==
Takashiro was born in Tokyo, Japan on August 18, 1964. At university, he received the “Tokyo International Video Biennale" prize. It was the first in his career. After that he became a filmmaker of CF and music videos.

== Works ==
=== PC software ===
- Interactive edition "Wacky Races (Japanese Title "チキチキマシーン猛レース") (CD-ROM game for Panasonic 3DO) (1994)
- Internet virtual city "Franky online" (1995)

=== Filmography ===
- video clip "National Koizumic Video/Kyōko Koizumi" (1989)
- television series banana Chips love (Fuji TV) (1991)
- television series Alphabet 2/3 (Fuji TV) (1992)
- video clip "everybody goes /Mr Children" (1994)
- Feature film "Samurai Fiction" Producer and SFX Supervisor. (1997)
- commercial film "Korea Japan FIFA World Cup" (this is 1st time joint venture all of Japanese TV station) (2002)
- Feature film "Mokkano Koibito" Producer (2002)
- Louis Vuitton + Takashi Murakami "Superflat Monogram" Producer (2003)
- commercial film The Roppongi Hills (2003)

=== Discography ===
- ”Hyper Rainbow DVD”(Def Jam Japan) (2005)
- Blaze with Barbara Tucker "Most Precious Love (DJ Takashiro Remixes)" (2006)
- Genki Rockets "Breeze" (4:20 Remix) (Q Entertainment) Remix (2007)
- King street sounds 15th Anniversary Remixed by DJ Takashiro (King street sounds)(2008)

=== Books ===
- “Takashiro Tsuyoshi no ooana ippatsu”(INFAS Publications, inc.) (1995)
- “Digital Japanese”(Kodansha) (1997)
- “Yabaize! Digital Japan”(Shueisha) 2006
- "Hikikomori Kokka Japan”(Takarajima) 2007
- “Survive! Nangoku Japan”(Shueisha) 2007
- ”70yen de hikouki ni noru houhou” (Takarajima) 2008

=== Commercials (actor) ===
- Nike Inc “Nike Air Max”
- Nippon Telegraph and Telephone
- Panasonic
- Vodafone
- Virgin Atlantic “Upper Class”
