= The Diplomat Kosaku Kuroda =

Japanese television drama series

- Genre: Action; Thriller
- Created by: Shinbo Yuichi
- Written by: Furuya Osho
- Directed by: Nishisaka Mizuki; Nagayama Kozo
- Starring: Yūji Oda; Kou Shibasaki
- Composer: Yugo Kanno
- Country of origin: Japan
- Original language: Japanese
- No. of episodes: 11

Production
- Producer: Makino Tadashi
- Production location: Japan
- Running time: Thursday 22:00

Original release
- Network: Fuji TV
- Release: 13 January – 17 March 2011

The Diplomat Kosaku Kuroda (外交官・黒田康作) is 2011 Japanese television drama starring Yūji Oda who reprised his role as Kosaku Kuroda in this sequel to Amalfi: Rewards of the Goddess (2009) with a supporting cast led by Kou Shibasaki and Kaho. South Korean actor Lee Byung-hun made a cameo as Kuroda's lawyer and childhood friend John.

== Cast ==
- Yūji Oda as Kosaku Kuroda
- Kou Shibasaki as Rikako Ogaki
- Kaho as Rui Shimomura
- Kei Tanaka as Mori Saionji
- Takahiro Nishijima as Yutaro Kimishima
- Masaomi Kondō as Shoosuke Saitou
- Lee Byung-hun as John
- Takeshi Kaga as Yosuke Ando
- Ryo Iwamatsu as Takeshikeru Yamazi
- Mahiru Konno as Tomoyo Shimomura
- Jun Miho as Kyouko Ogaki
- Koji Ookura as Yuji Kamosita
- Tetsushi Tanaka as Kazuhiko Niida
- Nana Katase as Aiko Sasaki
- Masato Hagiwara as Kichi Yuki
- Tamiyo Kusakari as Shoko Mikami
- Teruyuki Kagawa as Takeshi Shimomura
