= Yumoto =

Yumoto (written: 湯元 or 湯本) is a Japanese surname. Notable people with the surname include:

- Fumihisa Yumoto (湯本 史寿, born 1984), Japanese ski jumper
- Kazumi Yumoto (湯本 香樹実, born 1959), Japanese screenwriter and novelist
- Kenichi Yumoto (湯元 健一, born 1984), Japanese sport wrestler
- Sakura Yumoto (湯元 さくら, born 1997), Japanese artistic gymnast
- Shinichi Yumoto (湯元 進一, born 1984), Japanese sport wrestler
- Soya Yumoto (湯本 創也, born 2001), Japanese footballer

== See also ==
- Yumoto Station, a railway station in Iwaki, Fukushima Prefecture, Japan
