= Iwaki Yumoto Onsen =

Hot springs in Fukushima Prefecture, Japan

Iwaki Yumoto Onsen いわき湯本温泉
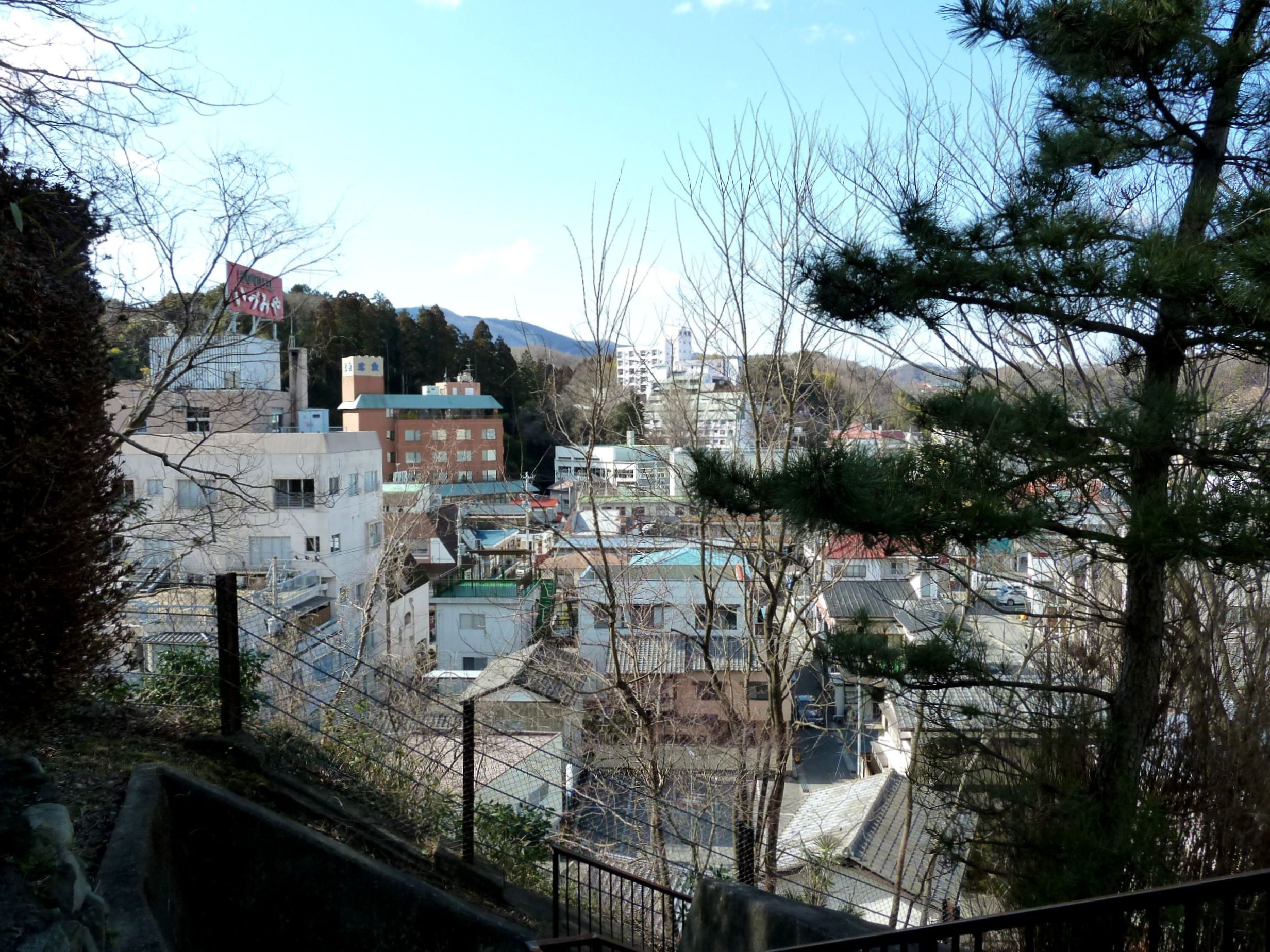
- Iwaki Yumoto Onsen

- Location within Fukushima Prefecture Location within Japan
- Interactive map of Iwaki Yumoto Onsen いわき湯本温泉
- Location: Iwaki, Fukushima, Japan
- Coordinates: 37°00′32″N 140°50′53″E
- Elevation: 0 m (0 ft)
- Type: saline
- Discharge: 5000 liters/min

Iwaki Yumoto Onsen (いわき湯本温泉) is an onsen resort in Iwaki, Fukushima Prefecture in Japan.

== History ==
Although known since the Nara period, the hot springs at Iwaki developed with borehole drilling in the Jōban Coal Fields in the Meiji period. To the west of the traditional onsen town is the Spa Resort Hawaiians.

== See also ==
- Three Ancient Springs
