= Aquamarine Fukushima =

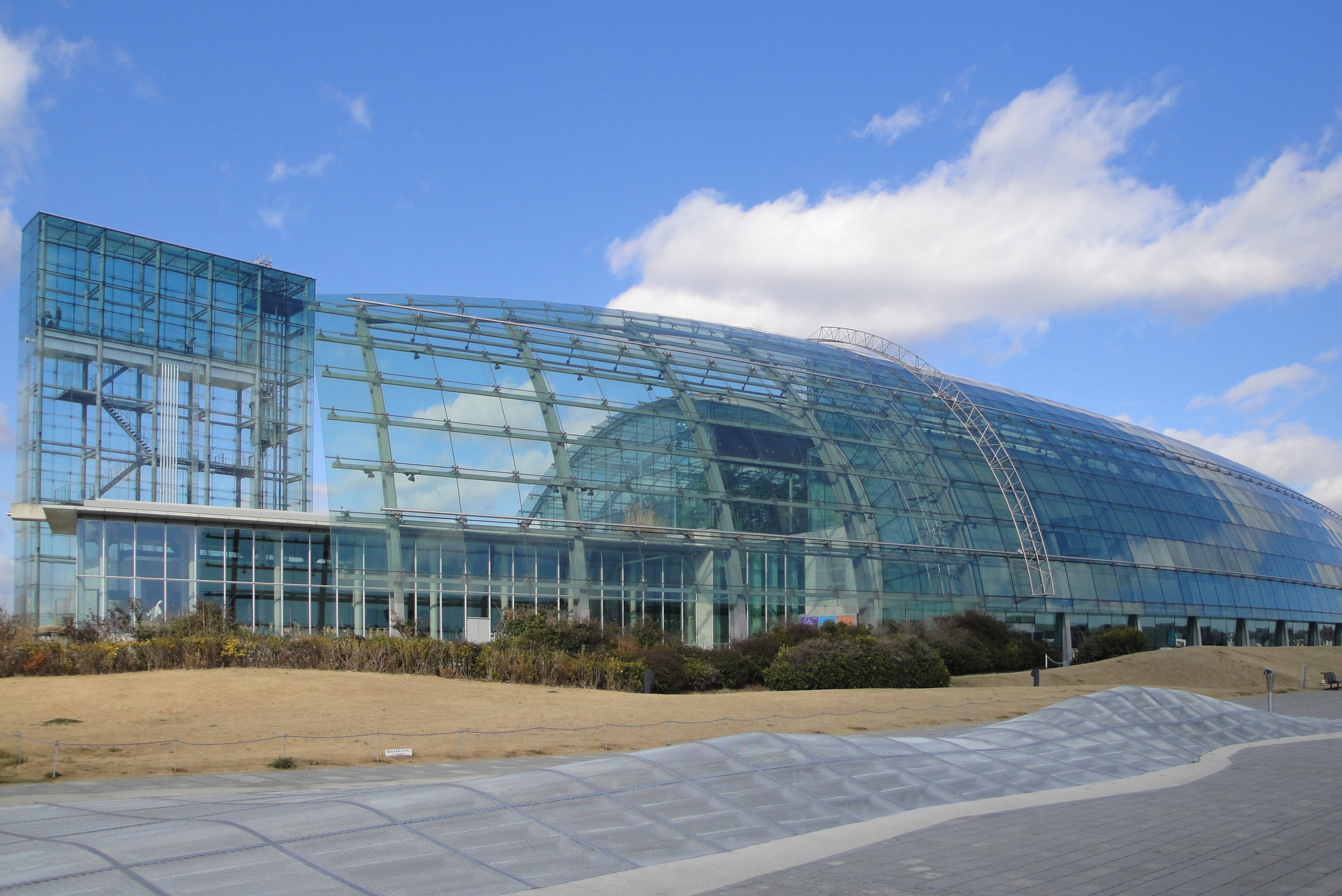
- Interactive map of Aquamarine Fukushima
- 36°56′33.9″N 140°54′05.4″E
- Date opened: 15 July 2000
- Location: Iwaki, Fukushima, Japan
- Floor space: 15,233 m^{2} (163,970 sq ft)
- No. of animals: 100,000
- No. of species: 800
- Volume of largest tank: 2,050,000 litres (542,000 US gal)
- Total volume of tanks: 3,900,000 litres (1,030,000 US gal)
- Memberships: JAZA
- Major exhibits: The Sea of tide tanks etc.
- Website: Official website

Aquamarine Fukushima (アクアマリンふくしま, Akuamarin Fukushima), officially the Marine Science Museum, Fukushima Prefecture (ふくしま海洋科学館, Fukushima Kaiyō Kagakukan), is a public aquarium located in Iwaki, Fukushima, Japan. The aquarium opened on 15 July 2000. It is the largest in the Tohoku region and focuses on environmental education. It is a member of the Japanese Association of Zoos and Aquariums (JAZA).

== History ==
In 1990, the Fukushima Prefecture Marine Recreation Advisory Committee recommended the establishment of a marine culture and learning facility in Iwaki City, and construction of the aquarium began in 1996 and opened in 2000. The nickname "Aquamarine Fukushima" was selected in 1998 from a total of 4,722 applications.

=== Great East Japan Earthquake (March 11, 2011) ===
The 2011 Tōhoku earthquake and tsunami on March 11, 2011, caused the aquarium to lose power and a 4.2 meter tsunami hit the building, flooding the entire first floor of the facility. The entire first floor of the facility was submerged. Eighty staff members evacuated to the third floor.

After that, under the direction of Director Yoshitaka Abe, the filtration system, which is a life-support system for captive animals, was operated with its own power generation system.

Many fish died, but some marine mammals and sea birds were subsequently transferred to Kamogawa Sea World, 250 kilometers (155 mi) to the south, Ueno Zoo, Tokyo Sea Life Park, Kamogawa Sea World, Izu Mito Sea Paradise, and Enoshima Aquarium. Although the main building sustained only minor damage, outside pools were washed away, and there was major damage to the electrical system (causing the death of about 90% of the animals in the aquarium).

The cranes used diesel fuel, which is a stockpiled fuel for in-house power generation equipment, for the cranes to carry them out. However, it was difficult to procure fuel and food due to the fact that the northern part of Iwaki City, where they are located, is within the 30 km radius of the Fukushima Daiichi nuclear power plant accident evacuation criteria, in addition to the blockage of the transportation network. The fishing port was paralyzed, and food for about 700 species of marine animals, including seals, crabs, amphibians, and birds, was unavailable. On March 25, it was learned that 200,000 marine animals had been wiped out when the last remaining small generator ran out of fuel and water management became impossible.

The web server in the facility was also damaged by the disaster, causing the official website to be temporarily inoperable, and the official website of Niigata City Aquarium posted the state of damage and other devastation on or around March 16.

The facility was closed after the tsunami, and reopened to the public on 15 July 2011, following restoration.

== Research and conservation ==
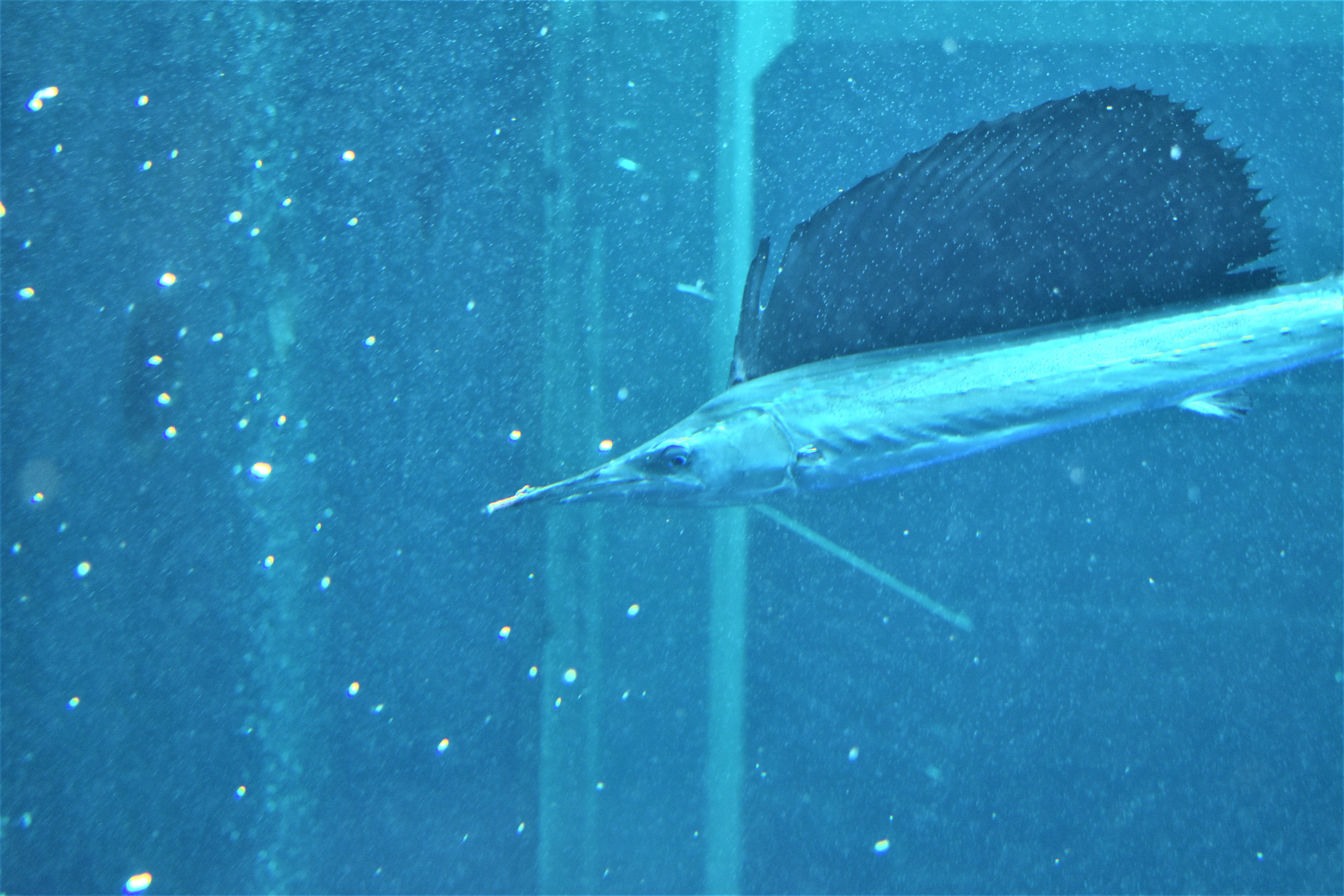
Indo-Pacific sailfish

Aquamarine Fukushima is the only aquarium that has successfully captivity Indo-Pacific sailfish for more than one week. In 2009 and 2020, aquariums succeeded in raising Indo-Pacific sailfish for two months.

They were subsequently exhibited in 2022 and 2023, both of which were kept for more than two months.

Aquariums are also focused on education about evolution. The coelacanth exhibition area holds multiple frozen specimens of West Indian Ocean coelacanth and Indonesian coelacanth.

The aquarium also successfully photographed the world's second coelacanth underwater in Indonesian waters, and in 2006 became the first aquarium in the world to successfully photograph a juvenile coelacanth underwater.

In Aquamarine Fukushima, a coelacanth robot that reproduces the movements of the coelacanth skeleton and muscles is installed.

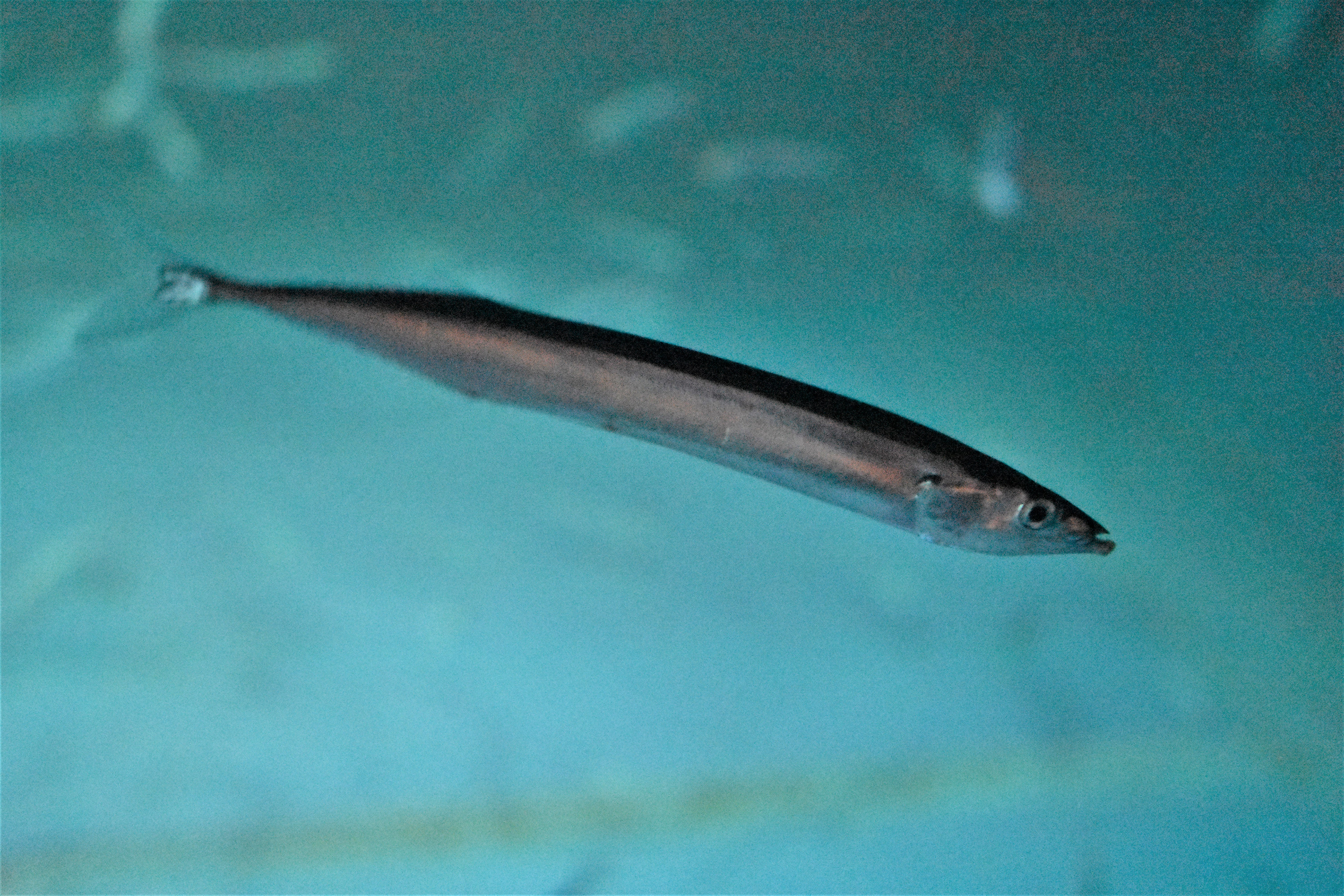
Pacific saury

Aquamarine Fukushima is dedicated to the study of saury ecology and is the only aquarium in the world to exhibit live saury. It is also the first aquarium in the world to successfully hatch saury from eggs.

The saury has no stomach and must be fed once an hour, so an automatic feeder was specially ordered so that the fish can be fed even in the middle of the night. The aquarium collects the eggs laid by the saury in the tanks, hatch them in the backyard, and return them to the tanks for display as adults, thus connecting up to eight generations of saury.

Research and conservation will be reported in Bulletin "AMF NEWS". Aquariums also have a friendly tie-up with Tokyo Sea Life Park, Niigata City Aquarium, Monterey Bay Aquarium, Palau International Coral Reef Center, Ocean Park Hong Kong, Baltimore National Aquarium.

== Exhibits ==
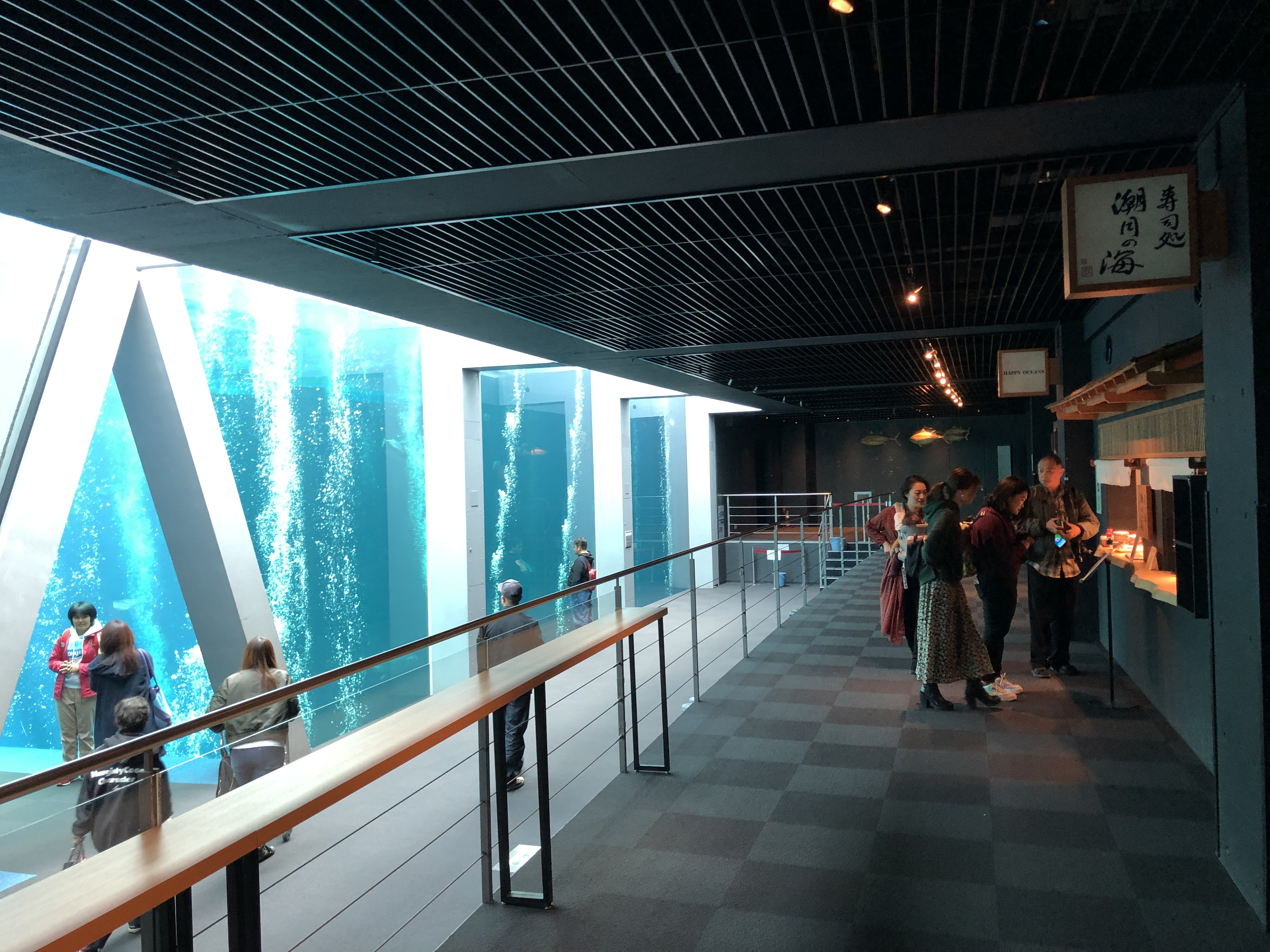
The Sea of tide tanks and SushiShop

The aquarium highlights the sea life in the Shiome Sea, where rivers flow into the sea and meet the collision of the Kuroshio and Oyashio ocean currents.

The centerpiece tank, "The Sea of tide", holds 2,050 cubic meters (540,000 U.S. gal) and contains a triangular tunnel that separates two tanks with different water temperatures (the two currents).

In the main tank, Saury and Tuna are exhibited on the Kuroshio side, and the theme is the rules of the ocean in the natural world where strong ones survive. The aquarium includes a botanical garden on the fourth floor that shows the plant life of Fukushima, and from which visitors can see the top of the main tank.

The aquarium has the world's largest touch pool of 4,500 m^{2} (48,000 sq ft). There are also a variety of experience programs such as a fishing pond where you can experience charcoal grilling and canning.

== Facilities ==
The area is as follows.

- Evolution of the sea and life
- Fukushima river and coast
- Seabirds and seabirds in the North Sea
- Oceanic Galleria
- Tropical Asian waterfront
- Coral reef sea
- Oyashio Ice Box
- Sea of tide
- Fukushima Sea-Road to the Continental Shelf-
- Friendship tie-up garden information corner
- Children's Experience Center Aquamarine Egg
- Aquamarine Uonozoki-Children's Fisheries Museum-
- BIOBIO Kappa no Sato
- Serpent's Eye Beach
- Goldfish Museum
- Exciting Satoyama / Jomon no Sato
- Kuwait-Fukushima Friendship Memorial Japanese Garden
- Denma Ship Studio

== Gallery ==
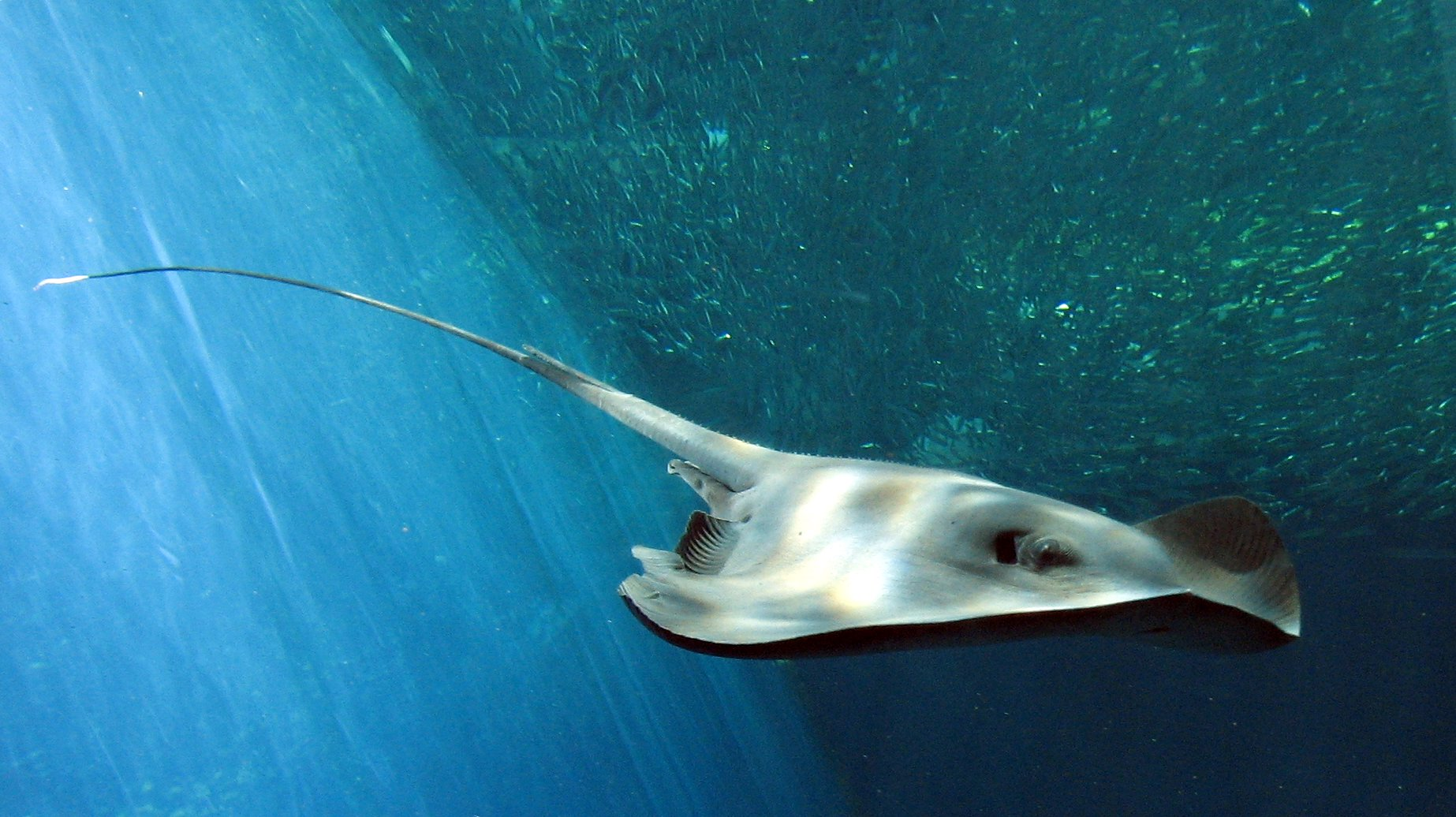

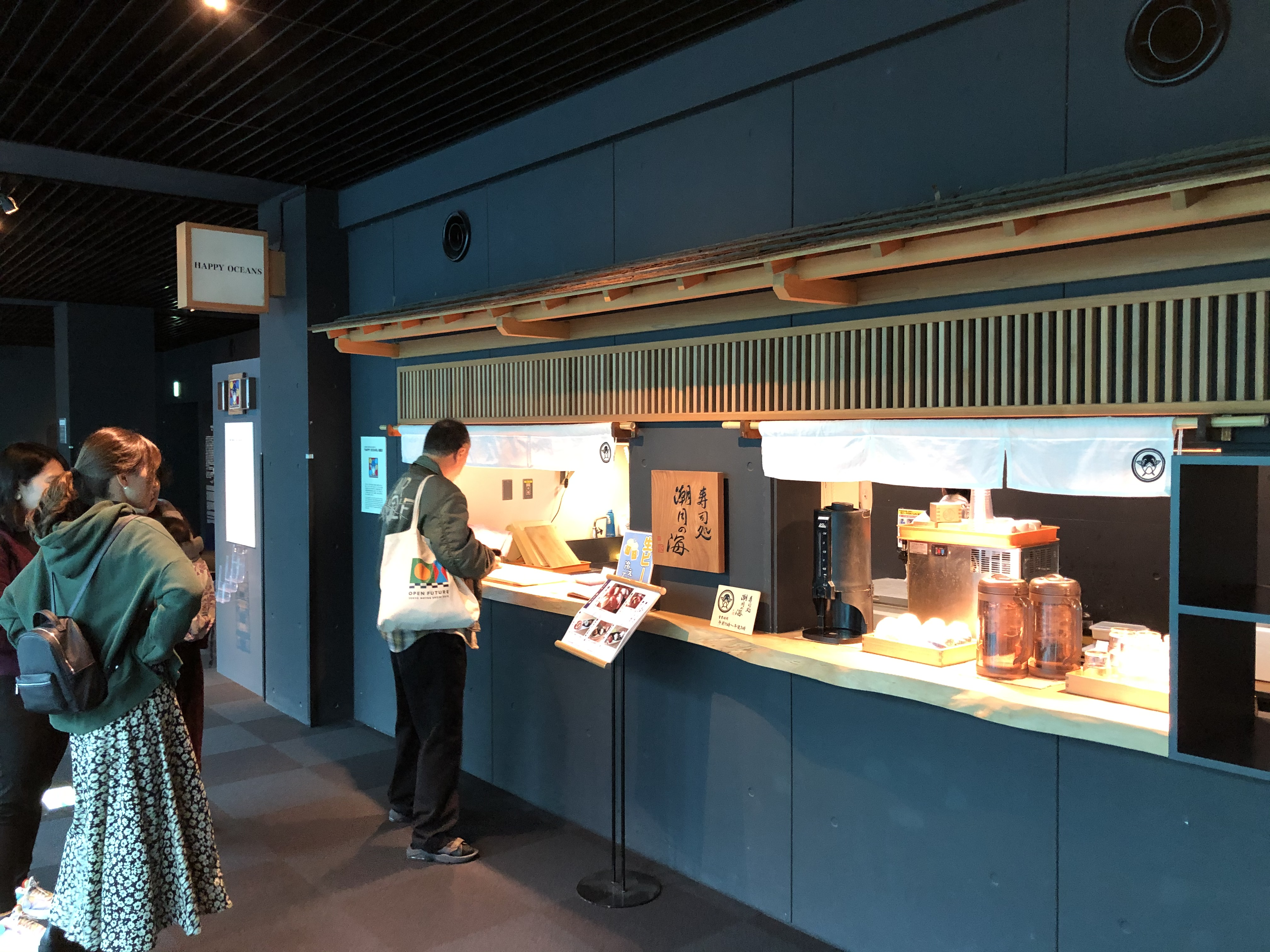

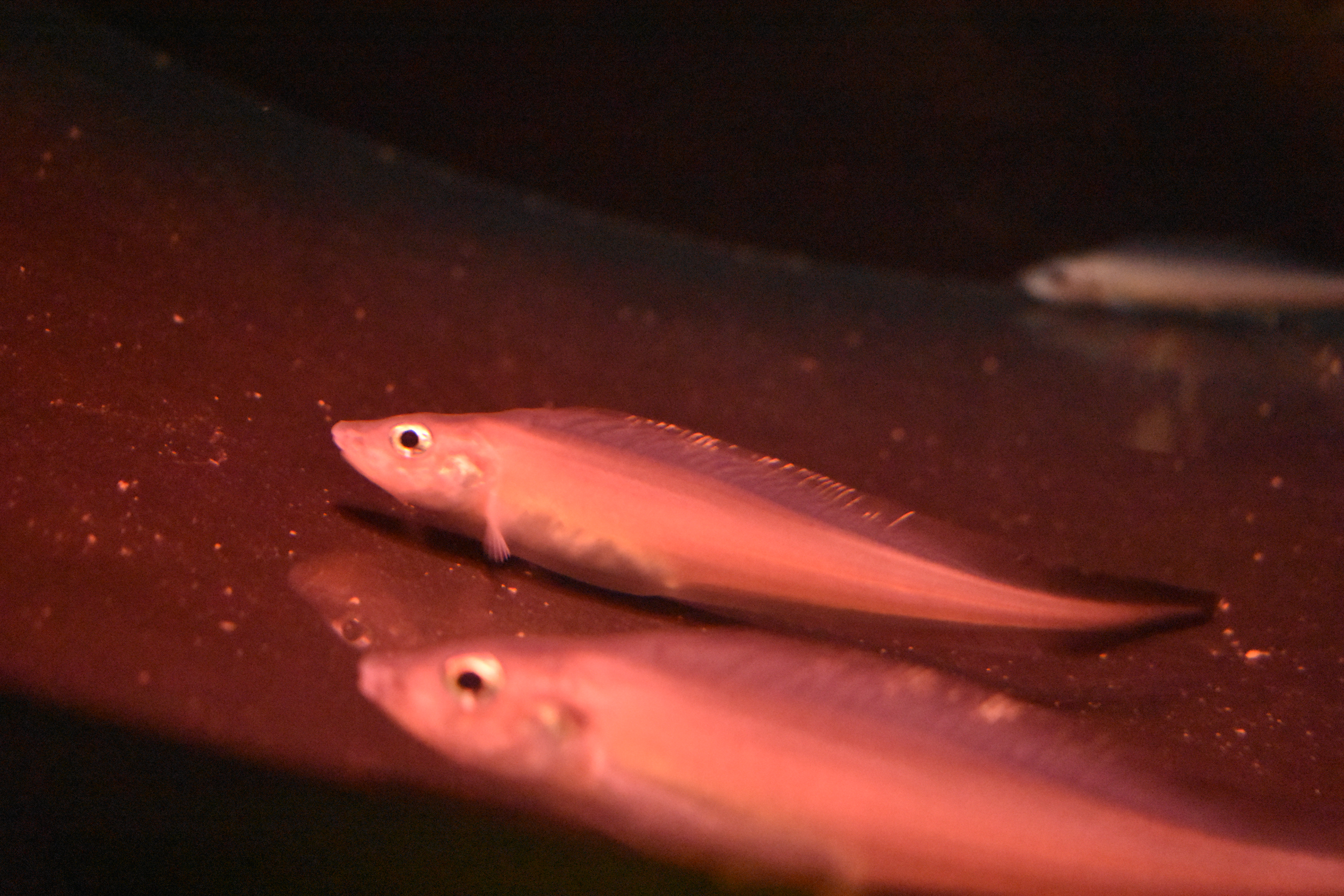

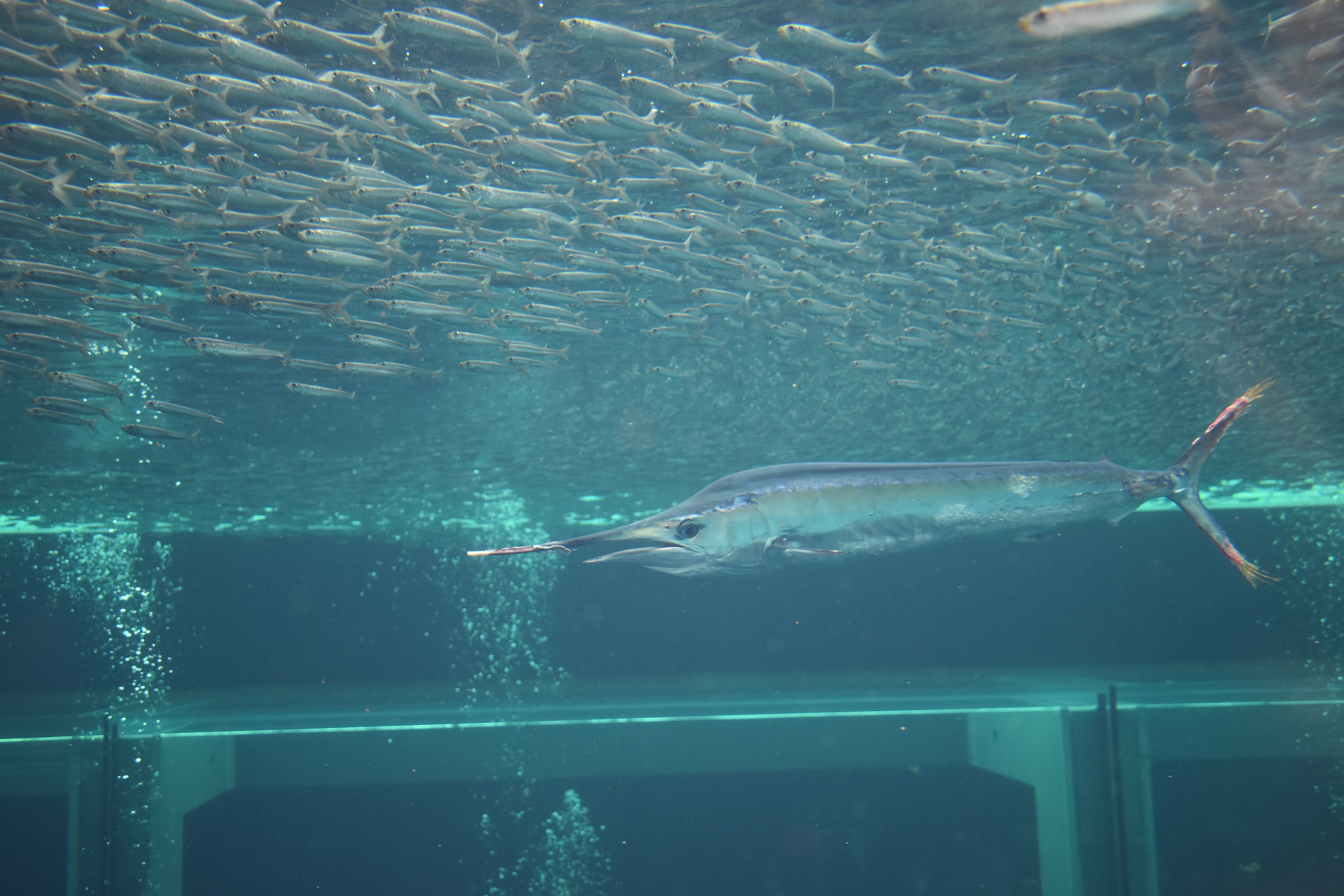

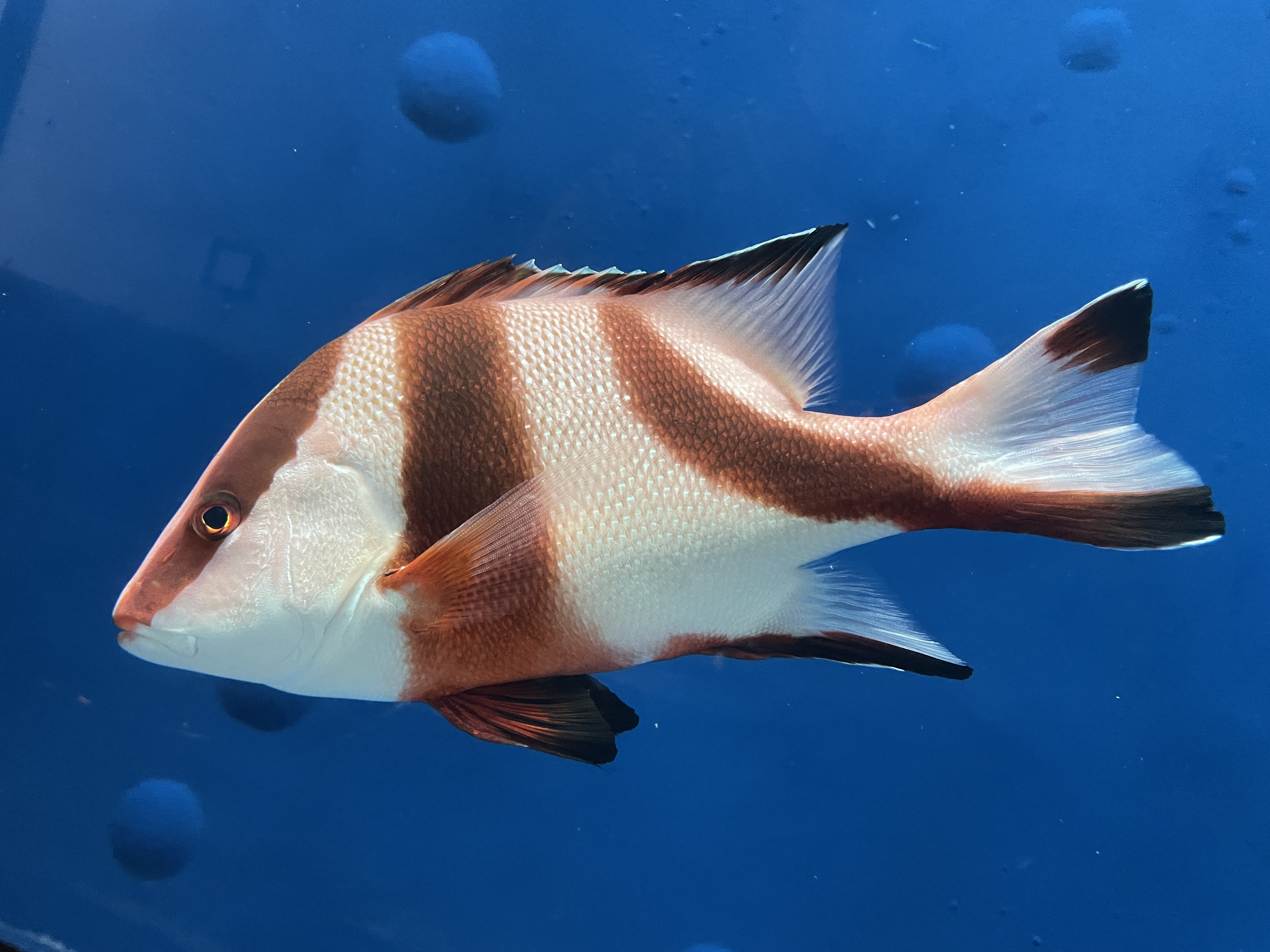

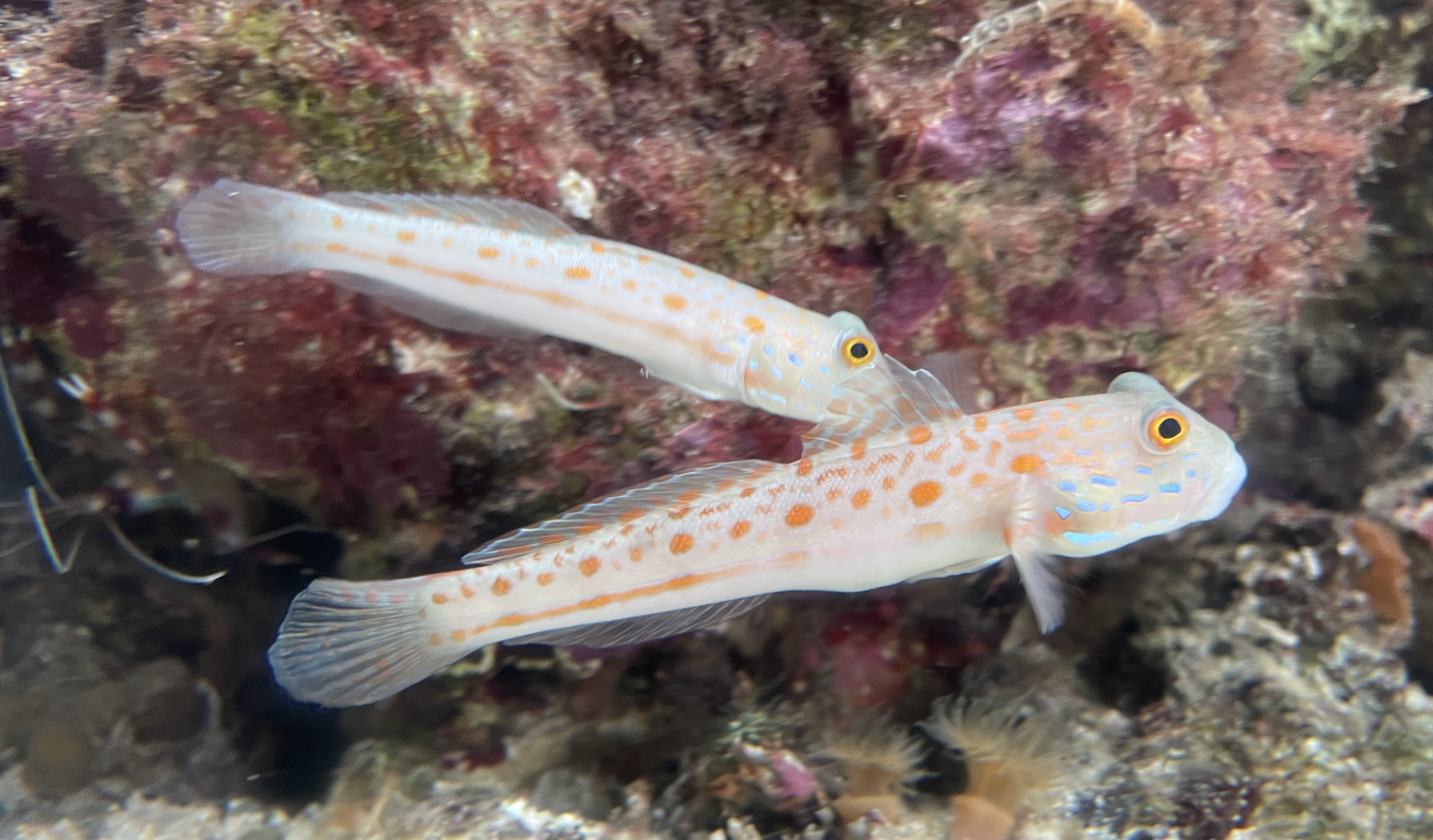

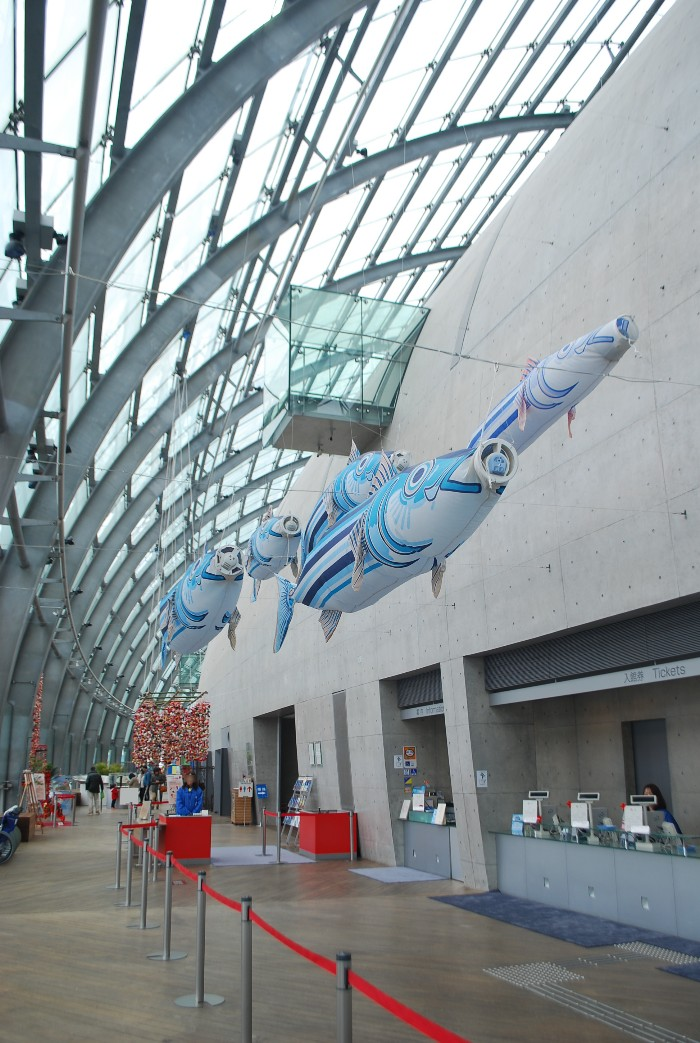

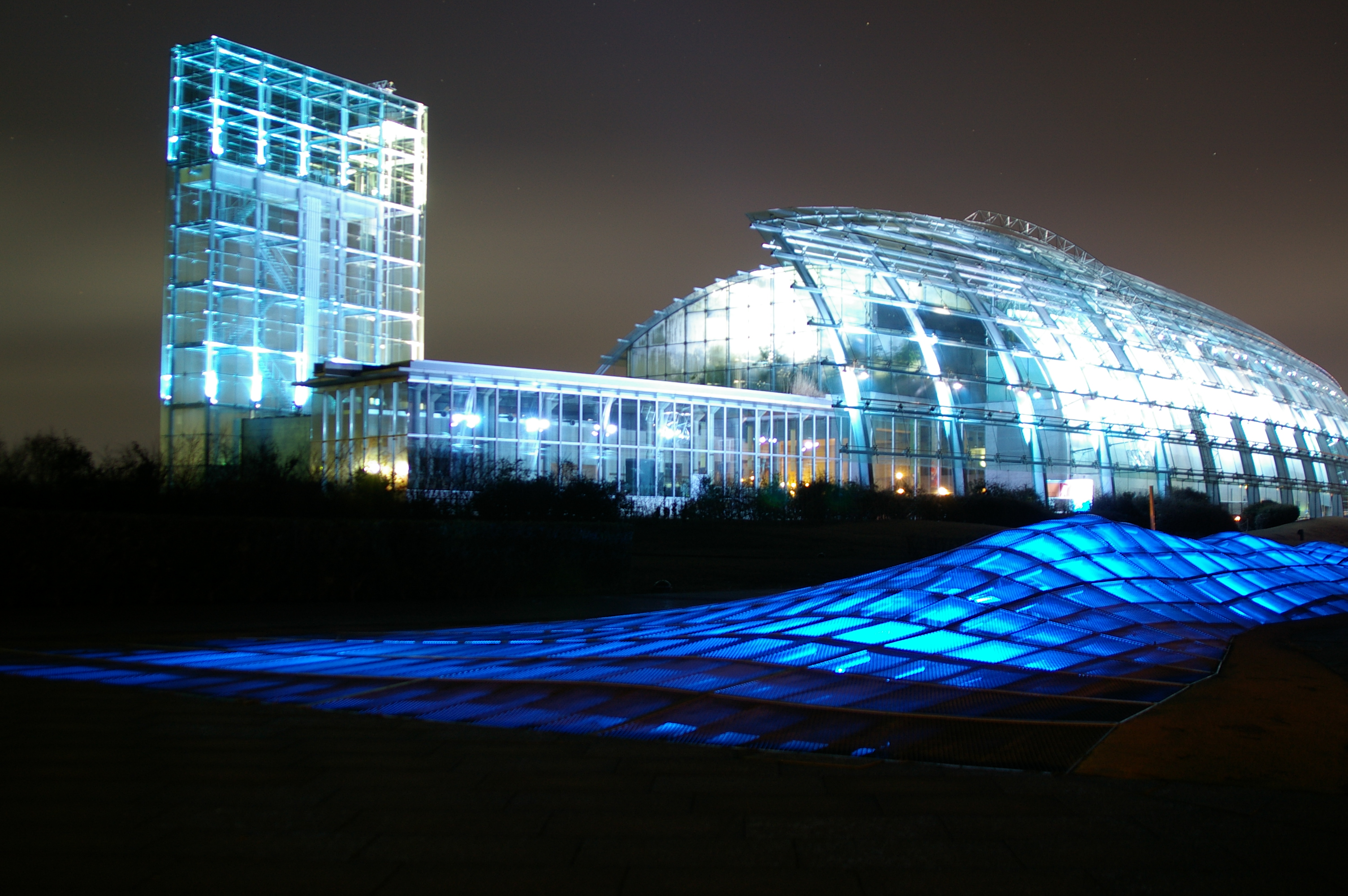

== See also ==
- Iwaki, Fukushima
- Tokyo Sea Life Park
