= Uchigō Station =

Railway station in Iwaki, Fukushima Prefecture, Japan

Uchigō Station 内郷駅
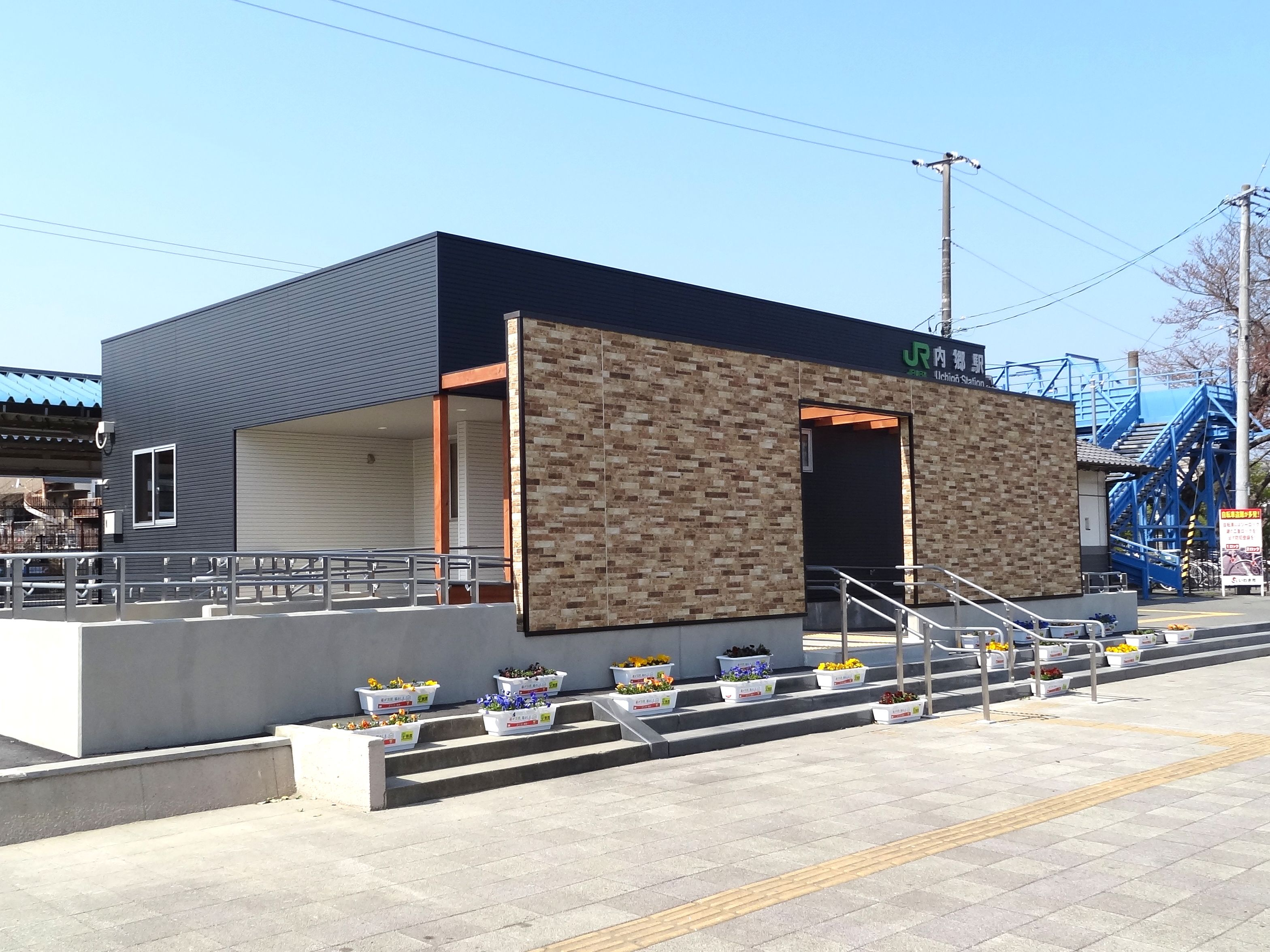
- Uchigō Station in March 2015

General information
- Location: 12 Enokishita, Uchigōtsuzura-cho, Iwaki-shi, Fukushima-ken 973-8403; Japan
- Coordinates: 37.0357°N 140.8549°E
- Operator: JR East
- Line: ■ Jōban Line
- Distance: 205.0 km from Nippori
- Platforms: 2 side platforms
- Tracks: 2

Other information
- Status: Staffed
- Website: Official website

History
- Opened: 25 February 1897
- Former names: Tsuzura (until 1956)

Passengers
- FY2018: 1,017 daily

Services
Preceding station	JR East	Following station
Yumoto towards Shinagawa	Jōban Line Local-Futsuu	Iwaki towards Sendai
Location
- Location within Fukushima Prefecture Location within Japan

Uchigō Station (内郷駅, Uchigō-eki) is a railway station on the Joban Line in the city of Iwaki, Fukushima Prefecture, Japan, operated by East Japan Railway Company (JR East).

== Lines ==
Uchigō Station is served by the Jōban Line, and is located 205.0 km from the official starting point of the line at Nippori.

== Station layout ==
Uchigō Station has two opposed side platforms connected to the station building by a footbridge. The station is staffed.

=== Platforms ===
1	■ Joban Line	for Isohara, Takahagi, Hitachi, Katsuta, Mito, Tomobe, Ishioka and Tsuchiura
2	■ Jōban Line	for Iwaki, Hirono, Tomioka, Namie, Haranomachi, Soma and Sendai

== History ==
The station opened as Tsuzura Station (綴駅) on 25 February 1897. It was renamed Uchigō Station on 20 December 1956. The station was absorbed into the JR East network upon the privatization of the Japanese National Railways (JNR) on 1 April 1987. A new station building was completed in November 2014.

== Passenger statistics ==
In fiscal 2018, the station was used by an average of 1017 passengers daily (boarding passengers only).

== Surrounding area ==
- Shiramizu Amidadō
- Ruins of the Mirokuzawa coal mine
- Uchigō Post Office

== See also ==
- List of railway stations in Japan
