= Three Ancient Springs =

Group of hot springs in Japan

The Three Ancient Springs (日本三古湯, Nihon San Kotō) is a term referring to a group of ancient onsen in Japan:

- Dōgo Onsen, Ehime Prefecture – According to the Fudoki, Prince Shōtoku visited the hot springs, then known as Iyo no yu, and built a monument.
- Shirahama Onsen, Wakayama Prefecture – Originally known as Iyo no yu or Ki no yu, the Nihon Shoki describes how the imperial family visited the hot springs in the early to mid-7th century.
- Arima Onsen, Hyōgo Prefecture – Also described in the Nihon Shoki.

The tenth century Engishiki gives a slightly different list:

- Dōgo Onsen, Ehime Prefecture
- Arima Onsen, Hyōgo Prefecture
- Iwaki Yumoto Onsen, Fukushima Prefecture
