= Nakoso Thermal Power Station =

Thermal power station in Iwaki, Fukushima, Japan

Nakoso Thermal Power Station 勿来発電所
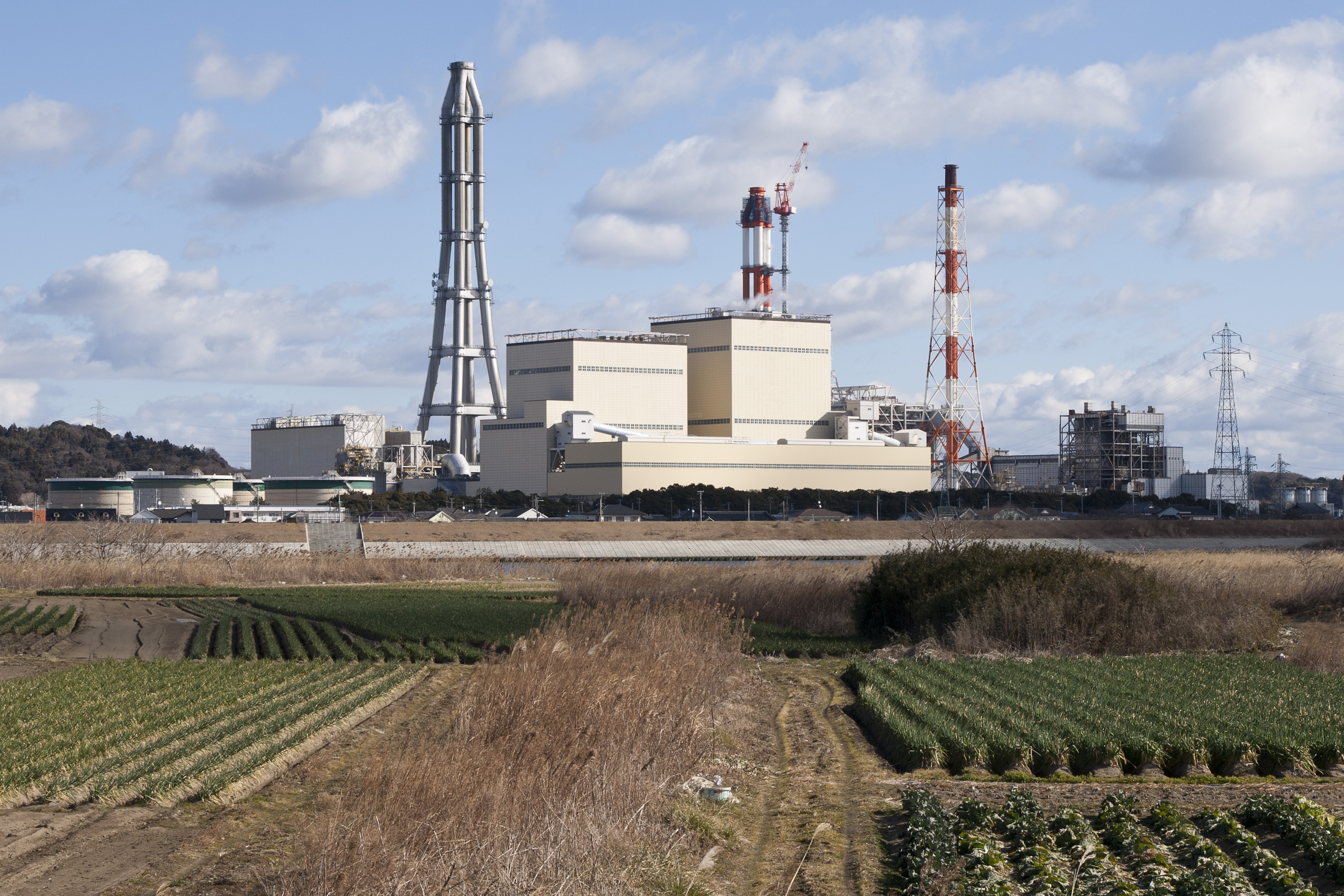
- Nakoso Thermal Power Station
- Country: Japan
- Location: Iwaki, Fukushima
- Coordinates: 36°54′39″N 140°48′51″E
- Status: Operational
- Commission date: 1957
- Owners: Jōban Joint Power Co., Ltd
- Operator: Joban Joint Power

Thermal power station
- Primary fuel: Coal

Power generation
- Units operational: 4
- Units decommissioned: 6
- Nameplate capacity: 1700 MW

External links
- Commons: Related media on Commons

The Nakoso Thermal Power Station (勿来発電所, Nakoso Karyoku Hatsudensho) is a coal-fired thermal power station operated by the Jōban Joint Power Co., Ltd. in the city of Iwaki, Fukushima, Japan. The facility is located on the Pacific coast of Honshu. The Jōban Joint Power Co., Ltd is a joint venture between Tohoku Electric, Tokyo Electric and a cooperative of coal producers in Fukushima Prefecture.

== History ==
The Jōban Joint Power Co., Ltd. was founded to provide baseline electrical power to the Tokyo Metropolis using low-grade coal from the Jōban coal fields of Fukushima Prefecture. The first two units came on line in 1957, followed by Units 3 and 4 in 1960, Unit 5 in 1961, Unit 6 in 1966 and Unit 7 in 1970. Due to increasing costs for domestic coal, Units 7 through 9 were designed to burn a mixture of carbonized sewage sludge with coal and heavy oil. Units 8 and 9 came on line in 1983. In March 2011, biomass (wood pellets) was introduced to the mixture.

A Coal Gasification Combined Cycle (IGCC) demonstration unit was constructed and tested from September 2007 to March 2013. Commercial operation began as Unit 10 in April 2013, and the institute was merged into Joban Joint Thermal Power.

Due to the age of the facilities and cost of maintenance and operation, Units 1-5 were abolished by 1987 and Unit 6 in November 2015.

Operations were temporarily suspended due to damage caused by the Tōhoku earthquake and tsunami in March 2011. At the time of the earthquake, Unit 8 was down for periodic maintenance. Most of the damage occurred at Onahama Port, which contained the wharf which was used for unloading coal, and to the coal conveyor to the power plant. Unit 9 resumed operation on June 30, 2012, Unit 8 on July 28 and Unit 7 on December 21.

On May 15, 2014, TEPCO and Joban Joint Thermal Power Co., Ltd. announced that it intended to construct a new large coal gasification combined cycle (IGCC) adjacent to this power plant as part of the Fukushima recovery project. This plant is scheduled for completion in September 2020, with a projected output of 540 MW.

== Plant details ==
| Unit | Fuel | Type | Capacity | On line | Status |
| 1 | Coal, Heavy Oil | Steam turbine | 35 MW | Nov 1957 | Decommissioned 1983, Scrapped |
| 2 | Coal, Heavy Oil | Steam turbine | 35 MW | 1960 | Decommissioned 1983, Scrapped |
| 3 | Coal, Heavy Oil | Steam turbine | 75 MW | 1960 | Decommissioned 1987, Scrapped |
| 4 | Coal, Heavy Oil | Steam turbine | 75 MW | 1960 | Decommissioned 1987, Scrapped |
| 5 | Coal, Heavy Oil | Steam turbine | 75 MW | 1961 | Decommissioned 1987, Scrapped |
| 6 | Heavy Oil | Steam turbine | 75 MW | Nov 1966 | Decommissioned 2015, Scrapped |
| 7 | Coal / Biomass | Steam turbine | 250 MW | July 1970 | operational |
| 8 | Coal / Biomass | Steam turbine | 600 MW | September 1983 | operational |
| 9 | Coal / Heavy Oil / Biomass | Steam turbine | 600 MW | December 1983 | operational |
| 10 | Coal | IGCC | 250 MW | April 2013 | operational |

== See also ==
- Energy in Japan
- List of power stations in Japan
