= Yumoto Station =

Railway station in Iwaki, Fukushima Prefecture, Japan

Yumoto Station 湯本駅
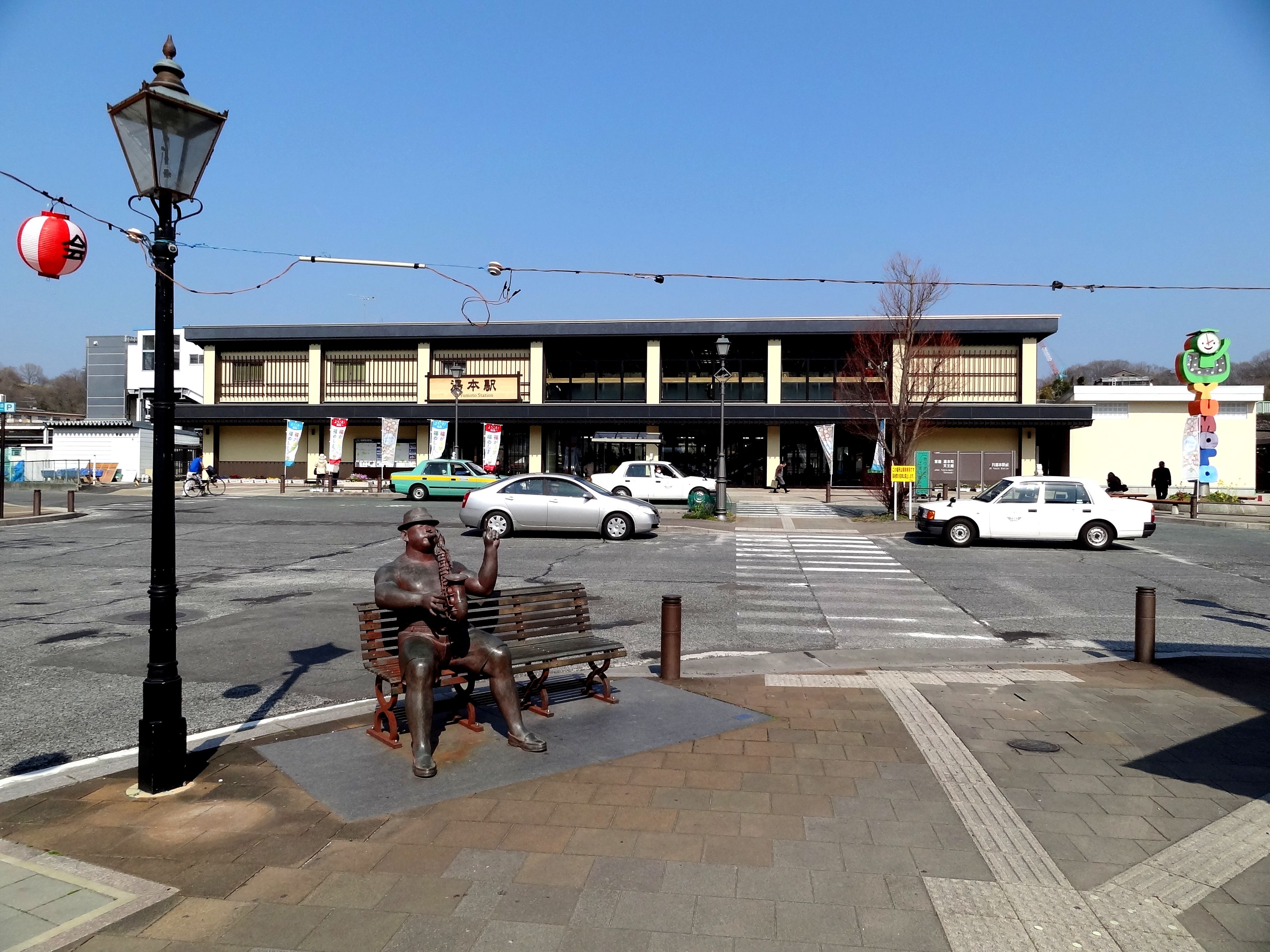
- Yumoto Station, March 2015

General information
- Location: Iwaki-Yumoto-cho Tennozaki 92, Iwaki-shi, Fukushima-ken 972-8321; Japan
- Coordinates: 37.0069°N 140.8501°E
- Operator: JR East
- Line: ■ Jōban Line
- Distance: 201.5 km from Nippori
- Platforms: 1 side + 1 island platform
- Tracks: 3

Other information
- Status: Staffed (Midori no Madoguchi )
- Website: Official website

History
- Opened: 25 February 1897; 129 years ago

Passengers
- FY2018: 2021 daily

Services
Preceding station	JR East	Following station
Izumi towards Shinagawa	Hitachi	Iwaki towards Sendai
Izumi towards Shinagawa	Jōban Line Local-Futsuu	Uchigō towards Sendai
Location
- Location within Fukushima Prefecture Location within Japan

Yumoto Station (湯本駅, Yumoto-eki) is a railway station on the Jōban Line in the city of Iwaki, Fukushima, Japan, operated by East Japan Railway Company (JR East).

== Lines ==
Yumoto Station is served by the Jōban Line, and is located 201.5 km from the official starting point of the line at Ueno.

== Station layout ==
Yumoto Station has one island platform and one side platform connected to the station building by a footbridge. The station has a Midori no Madoguchi staffed ticket office.

=== Platforms ===
1	■ Jōban Line	for Iwaki, Hirono, Tomioka, Namie, Haranomachi, Soma and Sendai
1	■ Jōban Line (Limited Express)	for Iwaki and Sendai
2	■ Joban Line	for Isohara, Takahagi, Hitachi, Katsuta, Mito, Tomobe, Ishioka and Tsuchiura
2	■ Jōban Line (Limited Express)	for Takahagi, Mito, Ueno, Tokyo and Shinagawa
3	■ Jōban Line	for Takahagi, Mito and Tsuchiura

== History ==
Yumoto Station opened on 25 February 1897. The present station building was completed in March 1967. The station was absorbed into the JR East network upon the privatization of the Japanese National Railways (JNR) on 1 April 1987. A new station building was completed in November 2014.

== Passenger statistics ==
In fiscal 2018, the station was used by an average of 2021 passengers daily (boarding passengers only).

== Surrounding area ==
- Iwaki Yumoto onsen
- Spa Resort Hawaiians
- Iwaki Coal and Fossil Museum
- Iwaki Post Office
- National Route 6

== See also ==
- List of railway stations in Japan
