= Iwaki, Fukushima =

Iwaki いわき市
- Core city
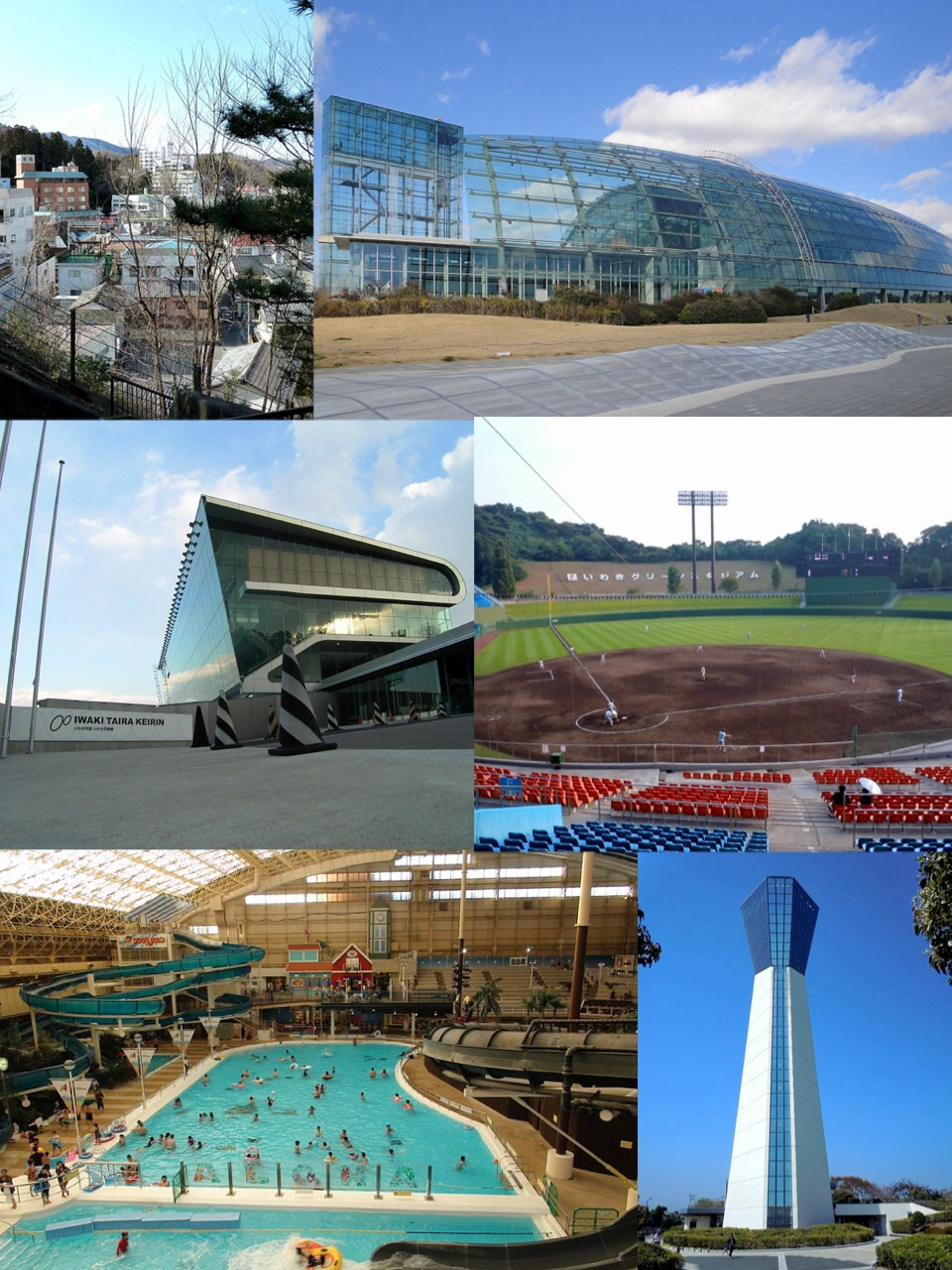
- Top: Iwaki Yumoto Onsen, Aquamarine Fukushima; Middle: Iwaki-Taira Velodrome, Iwaki Green Stadium; Bottom: Spa Resort Hawaiians, Iwaki Marine Tower

- Flag Seal

- Location of Iwaki in Fukushima Prefecture

- Coordinates: 37°3′1.8″N 140°53′15.8″E
- Country: Japan
- Region: Tōhoku
- Prefecture: Fukushima
- First official recorded: 100 AD
- As Taira city settled: June 1, 1937
- As former Iwaki and Jōban city settled: March 31, 1954
- As merger and current city name changed: October 1, 1966

Government
  - Mayor: Hiroyuki Uchida (since September 2021)

Area
  - Total: 1,232.02 km^{2} (475.69 sq mi)

Population (August 1, 2023)
  - Total: 322,019
  - Density: 261.375/km^{2} (676.958/sq mi)
- Time zone: UTC+9 (Japan Standard Time)
- Tree: Japanese Black Pine
- Flower: Azalea
- Bird: Seagull
- Fish: Greeneyes
- Phone number: 024-622-1111
- Address: 21 Umemoto, Taira, Iwaki-shi, Fukushima-ken 970-8686
- Website: Official website

Iwaki (いわき市, Iwaki-shi; Japanese pronunciation: [í.β̞ä̀.kì, ì.β̞ä́.ki̥.ɕì]) is a city located in Fukushima Prefecture, Japan. As of 1 August 2023, Iwaki had a population of 322,019 in 143,500 households, and a population density of 261 persons per km^{2}. The total area of the city is 1,232.02 square kilometres (475.69 sq mi), making it the largest city in the prefecture and the 10th largest city in Japan (2010) in terms of area. Iwaki is a designated core city, and is also one of the growing number of cities written in hiragana. The present Iwaki City started as the merger of 14 smaller municipalities on October 1, 1966. Every year, Iwaki hosts the Taira Tanabata Festival from 6–8 August.

== Geography and climate ==
The city is located at the southeastern end of Tōhoku region and borders on Ibaraki Prefecture. The city occupies around 8.9 percent of the total area of Fukushima Prefecture. The eastern part of the city is made up of 60 kilometres (37 mi) of coastline which faces the Pacific Ocean and the western part goes through the Abukuma highlands and joins up with the central part of Fukushima Prefecture. The western part is a range of mountains and forests, which occupies about 70 percent of the city. The rivers which flow to the east from the mountains have riverbeds with steep inclines that form the deep valleys of the Natsuigawa Gorge and the Shidokigawa Gorge. The flatter eastern part of the city is where most of the population is located. There are seven beaches on the coastline. Off the coast of Iwaki, the warm Kuroshio Current and the cold Oyashio Current meet and make for an abundant fishing ground. The city's flag and seal depict the meeting of these two currents. The prevailing winds from the ocean are warm and wet.

=== Neighboring municipalities ===
- North: Kawauchi, Naraha, Hirono
- West: Tamura, Ono, Hirata, Furudono
- South: Kitaibaraki (Ibaraki)

=== Climate ===
Iwaki is situated in a temperate climate zone (Köppen climate classification Cfa or humid subtropical climate) and has a moderate climate. The city's average temperature is 13.1 °C (55.6 °F) and its average annual precipitation is 1,383.0 millimetres (54.45 in). The highest recorded temperature in the city is 37.7 °C (99.9 °F), and the lowest recorded temperature is −10.7 °C (12.7 °F). The average year has 14.4 days with a high temperature over 25 °C (77 °F) and only 3.1 days with a low temperature below 0 °C (32 °F), which is smaller compared to other Japanese cities. The city is rarely hit by typhoons, and experiences only 0.7 days with more than 10 centimetres (3.9 in) of snowfall in the average year. The duration of bright sunshine is 2,058.1 hours in average year.

Climate data for Onahama, Iwaki (elevation 3.3 m, 1991–2020 normals, extremes 1910–present)
Month	Jan	Feb	Mar	Apr	May	Jun	Jul	Aug	Sep	Oct	Nov	Dec	Year
Record high °C (°F)	20.8 (69.4)	24.8 (76.6)	23.5 (74.3)	27.4 (81.3)	30.9 (87.6)	34.5 (94.1)	37.2 (99.0)	37.7 (99.9)	34.4 (93.9)	32.2 (90.0)	25.0 (77.0)	25.4 (77.7)	37.7 (99.9)
Mean maximum °C (°F)	14.2 (57.6)	16.0 (60.8)	18.4 (65.1)	22.9 (73.2)	26.0 (78.8)	28.8 (83.8)	31.3 (88.3)	33.0 (91.4)	31.0 (87.8)	26.6 (79.9)	21.7 (71.1)	17.8 (64.0)	33.8 (92.8)
Mean daily maximum °C (°F)	8.6 (47.5)	8.9 (48.0)	11.5 (52.7)	15.8 (60.4)	19.6 (67.3)	22.6 (72.7)	25.8 (78.4)	27.9 (82.2)	25.4 (77.7)	20.9 (69.6)	16.1 (61.0)	11.1 (52.0)	17.9 (64.2)
Daily mean °C (°F)	4.1 (39.4)	4.3 (39.7)	7.1 (44.8)	11.6 (52.9)	15.8 (60.4)	19.1 (66.4)	22.5 (72.5)	24.5 (76.1)	22.0 (71.6)	16.9 (62.4)	11.5 (52.7)	6.6 (43.9)	13.8 (56.8)
Mean daily minimum °C (°F)	−0.1 (31.8)	0.1 (32.2)	2.8 (37.0)	7.4 (45.3)	12.3 (54.1)	16.4 (61.5)	20.1 (68.2)	22.0 (71.6)	19.0 (66.2)	13.2 (55.8)	7.1 (44.8)	2.1 (35.8)	10.2 (50.4)
Mean minimum °C (°F)	−4.0 (24.8)	−3.9 (25.0)	−1.9 (28.6)	1.3 (34.3)	6.9 (44.4)	11.8 (53.2)	16.8 (62.2)	18.1 (64.6)	13.2 (55.8)	7.2 (45.0)	1.2 (34.2)	−2.6 (27.3)	−4.5 (23.9)
Record low °C (°F)	−9.3 (15.3)	−10.7 (12.7)	−8.5 (16.7)	−3.8 (25.2)	−0.6 (30.9)	4.8 (40.6)	9.6 (49.3)	11.6 (52.9)	7.2 (45.0)	0.8 (33.4)	−3.3 (26.1)	−7.1 (19.2)	−10.7 (12.7)
Average precipitation mm (inches)	57.3 (2.26)	54.0 (2.13)	108.4 (4.27)	125.2 (4.93)	146.1 (5.75)	149.5 (5.89)	160.7 (6.33)	122.6 (4.83)	192.3 (7.57)	193.1 (7.60)	80.3 (3.16)	51.3 (2.02)	1,440.7 (56.72)
Average precipitation days (≥ 0.5 mm)	5.1	5.8	9.9	10.8	11.9	12.6	13.4	9.7	12.2	11.2	7.6	5.9	116.2
Average relative humidity (%)	58	59	62	68	76	83	86	84	80	75	69	62	72
Mean monthly sunshine hours	193.4	180.3	191.4	192.8	193.0	150.3	151.1	183.1	144.5	147.3	162.4	179.0	2,068.6
Source: Japan Meteorological Agency

Climate data for Yamada, Iwaki (elevation 25 m, 2009–2020 normals, extremes 2009–present)
Month	Jan	Feb	Mar	Apr	May	Jun	Jul	Aug	Sep	Oct	Nov	Dec	Year
Record high °C (°F)	17.5 (63.5)	22.5 (72.5)	24.5 (76.1)	28.2 (82.8)	32.5 (90.5)	35.9 (96.6)	36.0 (96.8)	36.6 (97.9)	36.5 (97.7)	31.3 (88.3)	25.5 (77.9)	22.2 (72.0)	36.6 (97.9)
Mean daily maximum °C (°F)	8.5 (47.3)	9.0 (48.2)	12.4 (54.3)	16.9 (62.4)	21.9 (71.4)	24.1 (75.4)	27.9 (82.2)	29.4 (84.9)	26.3 (79.3)	21.3 (70.3)	16.4 (61.5)	11.2 (52.2)	18.8 (65.8)
Daily mean °C (°F)	2.9 (37.2)	3.6 (38.5)	6.8 (44.2)	11.1 (52.0)	16.5 (61.7)	19.6 (67.3)	23.5 (74.3)	24.8 (76.6)	21.4 (70.5)	16.2 (61.2)	10.6 (51.1)	5.4 (41.7)	13.6 (56.5)
Mean daily minimum °C (°F)	−2.2 (28.0)	−1.4 (29.5)	1.3 (34.3)	5.5 (41.9)	11.3 (52.3)	15.9 (60.6)	20.1 (68.2)	21.4 (70.5)	17.7 (63.9)	12.0 (53.6)	5.6 (42.1)	0.4 (32.7)	9.0 (48.2)
Record low °C (°F)	−7.2 (19.0)	−7.6 (18.3)	−4.7 (23.5)	−3.6 (25.5)	2.8 (37.0)	5.8 (42.4)	15.8 (60.4)	13.1 (55.6)	9.9 (49.8)	3.8 (38.8)	−1.9 (28.6)	−6.9 (19.6)	−7.6 (18.3)
Average precipitation mm (inches)	45.3 (1.78)	56.5 (2.22)	113.5 (4.47)	163.4 (6.43)	148.4 (5.84)	194.4 (7.65)	161.5 (6.36)	163.9 (6.45)	193.6 (7.62)	213.2 (8.39)	74.2 (2.92)	71.0 (2.80)	1,601 (63.03)
Average precipitation days (≥ 1.0 mm)	4.0	5.7	9.0	9.2	8.6	12.3	14.1	10.3	11.3	9.5	6.8	5.7	108.0
Mean monthly sunshine hours	202.9	173.2	196.4	196.2	210.6	150.0	139.9	168.6	126.5	135.7	159.8	175.5	2,047.8
Source: Japan Meteorological Agency (2009–2020 normals, extremes 2009–present)

=== Natural environment ===
- Rivers: Natsuigawa River, Samegawa River, Yoshimagawa River, Fujiwara River
- Gorges: Natsuigawa Gorge, Shidokigawa Gorge
- Mountains: Mizuishiyama, Yunodake, Futatsuyasan, Ishimoriyama
- Hot springs: Iwaki Yumoto Onsen

== Demographics ==
Per Japanese census data, the population of Iwaki has remained relatively steady over the past 60 years.

Historical population
Year	Pop.	±%
1920	210,550	—
1930	216,740	+2.9%
1940	260,653	+20.3%
1950	340,260	+30.5%
1960	345,663	+1.6%
1970	327,164	−5.4%
1980	342,074	+4.6%
1990	355,812	+4.0%
2000	360,138	+1.2%
2010	342,249	−5.0%
2020	324,313	−5.2%

== History ==
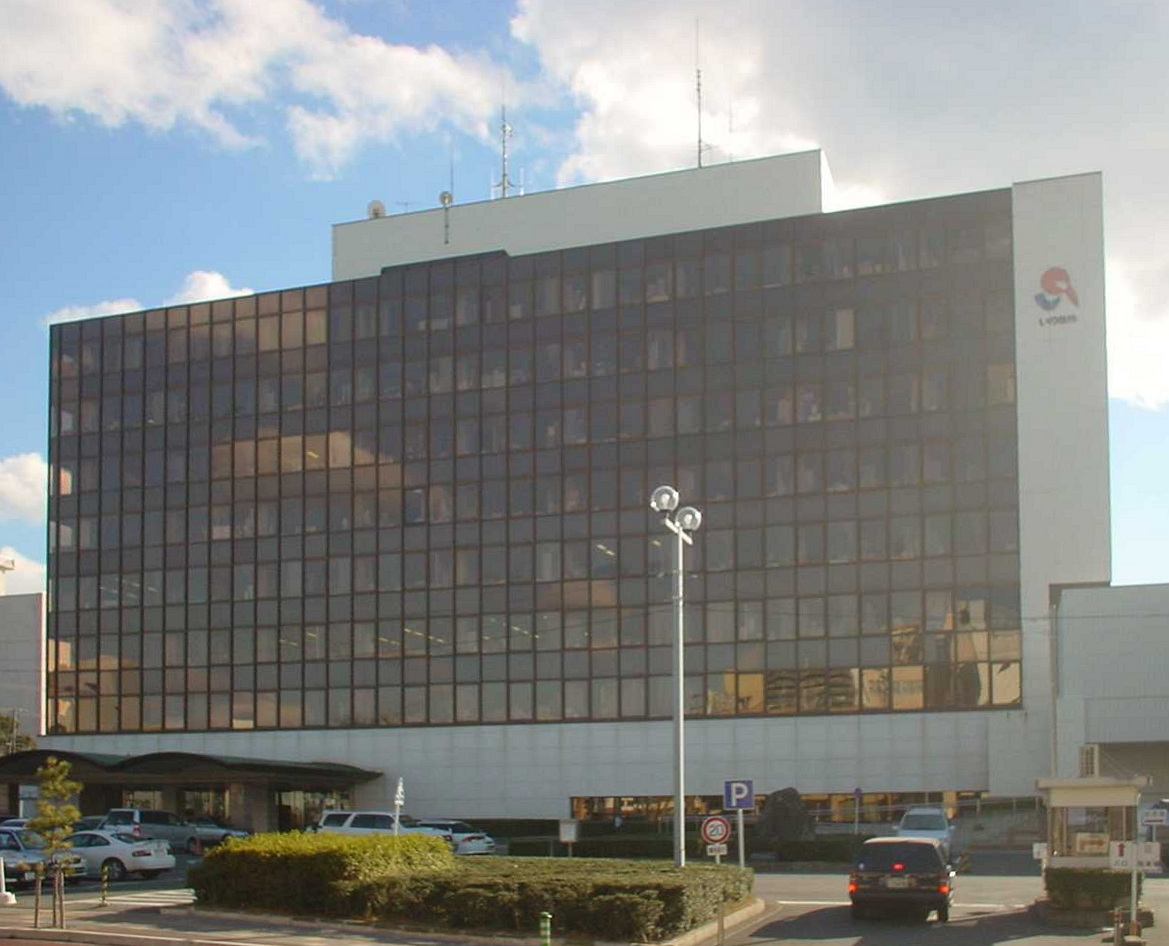
Iwaki City Hall

The area of present-day Iwaki was part of ancient Mutsu Province. The forms いわき, 石城, 岩城, 巖城, 巌城, and 磐城 are all ways of writing "Iwaki", which means "rocky castle". Under the Nara period Taika Reform of 645 AD, the central government formed "Iwaki district (磐城郡)" in the northern part of the present city and "Kikuta district (菊多郡)" in the southern part. In 653, the Iwaki district incorporated part of Taga Province and became Iwaki district (岩城評). In 718, Iwaki Province was formed, which was composed of five districts with Mutsu Province: Iwaki (岩城), Shineha, Namekata, Uta, Watari and Kikuta which was given from Hitachi Province. Shineha was the present Naraha. Namekata and Uta were the present Sōma. Watari was the present Watari, Miyagi. The area of the present Iwaki City was composed of Kikuta and Iwaki (岩城 or 磐城). The imperial government constructed the Nakoso barrier around 708 AD against possible invasion by the Emishi tribes in the north.

In the late 11th century, the Iwaki clan (岩城氏) of Hitachi Province invaded Iwaki district (磐城郡) and divided it into four districts of Yoshima, Iwasaki, Iwaki, Naraha. The clan ruled the area from the Kamakura period to the end of the Sengoku period. In 1600, Iwaki Sadataka opposed Tokugawa Ieyasu during the Battle of Sekigahara and as a result, the Iwaki clan was deposed. Torii Tadamasa was appointed as daimyō of Iwakitaira Domain under the Edo period Tokugawa shogunate, with an assessed kokudaka of 100,000 koku and constructed Iwakitaira Castle. The domain covered only a portion of what is now Iwaki city: other parts of the city were under the control of Izumi Domain (1634) and Yunagaya Domain (1670). All three domains joined the Ōuetsu Reppan Dōmei during the Bakumatsu period in support of the Tokugawa against the Satchō Alliance during the Boshin War, but following the Meiji Restoration, and the 1871 Abolition of the han system The new Meiji government created Iwakitaira Prefecture, Yunagaya Prefecture and Izumi Prefecture, which were incorporated to Iwamae (Iwasaki) Prefecture (磐前県) and to the current Fukushima Prefecture (1876). In 1896, Iwaki Bank and Taira Bank were established.

In 1897, the Japanese Government Railway filled in the inner moat of Iwakidaira Castle and built Taira Station. The Jōban coalfield, the largest coalfield in Honshū and the nearest to the Japanese capital Tokyo, was developed, and the population of Taira increased to support the exploitation of the coalfield. The Jōban Line was made for the haulage of the coal. Iwaki's fishery, forestry and agricultural sectors also developed from this time. After World War II, the Jōban coalfield was closed. The same natural hot springs that were troublesome to the coal miners were put to good use and a hot springs resort was developed Spa Resort Hawaiians.

The present city was incorporated on October 1, 1966, with the merger of 14 municipalities (5 cities, 4 towns and 5 villages). The cities were Taira (平), Uchigō (内郷), Iwaki (磐城), Nakoso (勿来), and Jōban (常磐); the towns, Yotsukura, (四倉) Tōno (遠野), Ogawa (小川) and Hisanohama (久之浜); and the five villages were Yoshima (好間), Miwa (三和), Tabito (田人), Kawamae (川前) and Ōhisa (大久). Taira was chosen as the location for the city hall and other administrative offices and continues to function as the centre of Iwaki. In April 1979, an "Iwaki Number" as an automobile number plate was introduced.

On April 1, 1999, the city was designated a core city with increased autonomy from the prefectural government.

On 11 March 2011, the city was struck by an earthquake and followed by a tsunami. By 20 May 2011, 303 were dead and 82 still missing.

== Government ==
Iwaki has a mayor-council form of government with a directly elected mayor and a unicameral city legislature of 37 members. The city contributes 10 members to the Fukushima Prefectural Assembly. In terms of national politics, Iwaki is part of the Fukushima 4th District of lower house of the Diet of Japan.

=== Mayors ===
- Transition manager Shōbē Akazu (赤津庄兵衛) 1964–
- 1st Yaichi Ōwada (大和田弥一) 1966–
- 2nd Kanemitsu Tabata (田畑金光) 1974–
- 3rd Takeo Nakata (中田武雄) 1986–
- 4th Mitsuhide Iwaki (岩城光英) 1990–
- 5th Keisuke Shike (四家啓助) 1997
- 6th Kazuo Kushida (櫛田一男) 2005–

=== Subdivisions ===
Iwaki is a decentralised city created the merger of 14 municipalities (5 cities, 4 towns and 5 villages). The cities were Taira (平), Uchigō (内郷), Iwaki (磐城), Nakoso (勿来), and Jōban (常磐); the towns, Yotsukura (四倉), Tōno (遠野), Ogawa (小川) and Hisanohama (久之浜); and the five villages were Yoshima (好間), Miwa (三和), Tabito (田人), Kawamae (川前) and Ōhisa (大久).

The central area of Iwaki is the former city of Taira, which has Iwaki City Hall, Iwaki City Lyceum, Iwaki Station, etc. Onahama and Yumoto were annexed by Iwaki in 1954, prior to the 1966 merger. Yumoto is home to Iwaki Yumoto Onsen, one of the oldest onsen in Japan, with many ryokan hotels. It is also home to Spa Resort Hawaiians, a spa resort which draws 1.5 million visitors per year and was the subject of the 2006 movie Hula Girls. Onahama is a port town where many factories, fisheries and port facilities are located. There is also an aquarium, some beaches and seaside restaurants.

There are thirteen zones (hamlets or 大字 (Ōaza)) within the city.

- Taira
- Onahama & Ena & Izumi
- Nakoso & Nishiki & Ueda
- Jōban & Yumoto
- Uchigō
- Yotsukura
- Tōno
- Ogawa
- Yoshima
- Miwa
- Tabito
- Kawamae
- Hisanohama & Ōhisa

Zone	Population	Households	Area (km^{2})	Population density (/km^{2})
Taira	99,901	38,685	109.88	909.18
Onahama	77,857	29,182	87.64	888.37
Nakoso	51,783	18,651	104.74	494.39
Jōban	35,904	13,550	48.23	744.43
Uchigō	28,214	11,462	31.62	892.28
Yotsukura	15,686	5,284	63.73	246.13
Tōno	6,404	1,913	104.53	61.26
Ogawa	7,567	2,481	112.49	67.26
Yoshima	13,597	5,319	26.69	509.44
Miwa	3,676	1,107	214.90	17.10
Tabito	2,117	713	158.07	13.39
Kawamae	1,448	509	116.44	12.43
Hisanohama, Ōhisa	5,965	1,958	52.38	113.87
Total	350,119	130,814	1,231.34	284.33

As of October 1, 2007

== Economy ==
The main foundations of economy are industry and agriculture. In particular, Iwaki is a centre for manufacturing machinery, wood based products and chemicals. The industrial production of Iwaki City is #1 in Tōhoku region. Iwaki is rich in sightseeing resources and 7.64 million tourists visit annually. Within Fukushima prefecture, the industrial and sightseeing center is Iwaki, while the political center is Fukushima city. The Nakoso Thermal Power Station, a large coal-fired thermal power station is located in Iwaki.

Statistics (2006)

- Employed population: 174,048
- Unemployed population: 121,802
- Gross production: ¥1,293,782 billion
- Number of tourists: 7,639,296

=== Major companies ===
==== Major companies with head offices in Iwaki ====
- Daio Paper Corp.; TYO1
- Joban Kosan Co., Ltd.; Spa Resort Hawaiians, TYO1
- Honeys Co., Ltd.; boutique shops, TYO1
- Nippon Kasei Chemical Company Limited, TYO1
- Maruto supermarkets
- Tōyō system; secondary battery
- Yugetsu

==== Major companies with factories in Iwaki ====
- Alps Electric Co. & Alpine Electronics; TYO1
- Arakawa Chemical Industries, Ltd; TYO1, OSE1
- S. T. Corporation (old S.T. Chemistry); TYO1
- Okamoto Industries, Inc.; TYO1
- Cleanup Corporation; TYO1
- Kureha Corporation; TYO1, OSE1
- Mazda; TYO1
- Nissan Motors; TYO1
- Organo Corp.; TYO1
- Mitsubishi Materials Corporation; TYO1
- Aska Pharmaceutical Co., Ltd.; TYO1
- Nichiha Corporation; NSE1, TYO1
- Nippon Paper Industries Co., Ltd.
- Merck KGaA; DAX
- Merck & Co.; NYSE

=== Banks ===
(As of 2007)

- Iwaki Credit Association
- Himawari Credit Association
- Toho Bank
- Fukushima Bank
- Daito Bank
- Joyo Bank
- The 77 Bank
- Tohoku Industrial Bank
- Abukuma Trust Bank
- Akita Bank
- Mizuho Bank
- National Life Finance Corporation

=== Fisheries ===
Fishery: 75,628t (2003)

=== Import and export ===
Onahama Port (2003)

Import: 5,133,727t
Export: 514,045t

== Transportation ==
Surrounded by the ocean and mountains, Iwaki is more closely connected to Mito in neighboring Ibaraki Prefecture than to the Nakadōri region of Fukushima, including Kōriyama or the prefectural capital of Fukushima). Iwaki is 75 km from Kōriyama, 150 km from Sendai and 95 km from Mito. The Jōban Line runs north and south in the city. The central station is Iwaki Station, which is also a terminus for the East Ban'etsu Line which links Iwaki to Kōriyama.

=== Railway ===
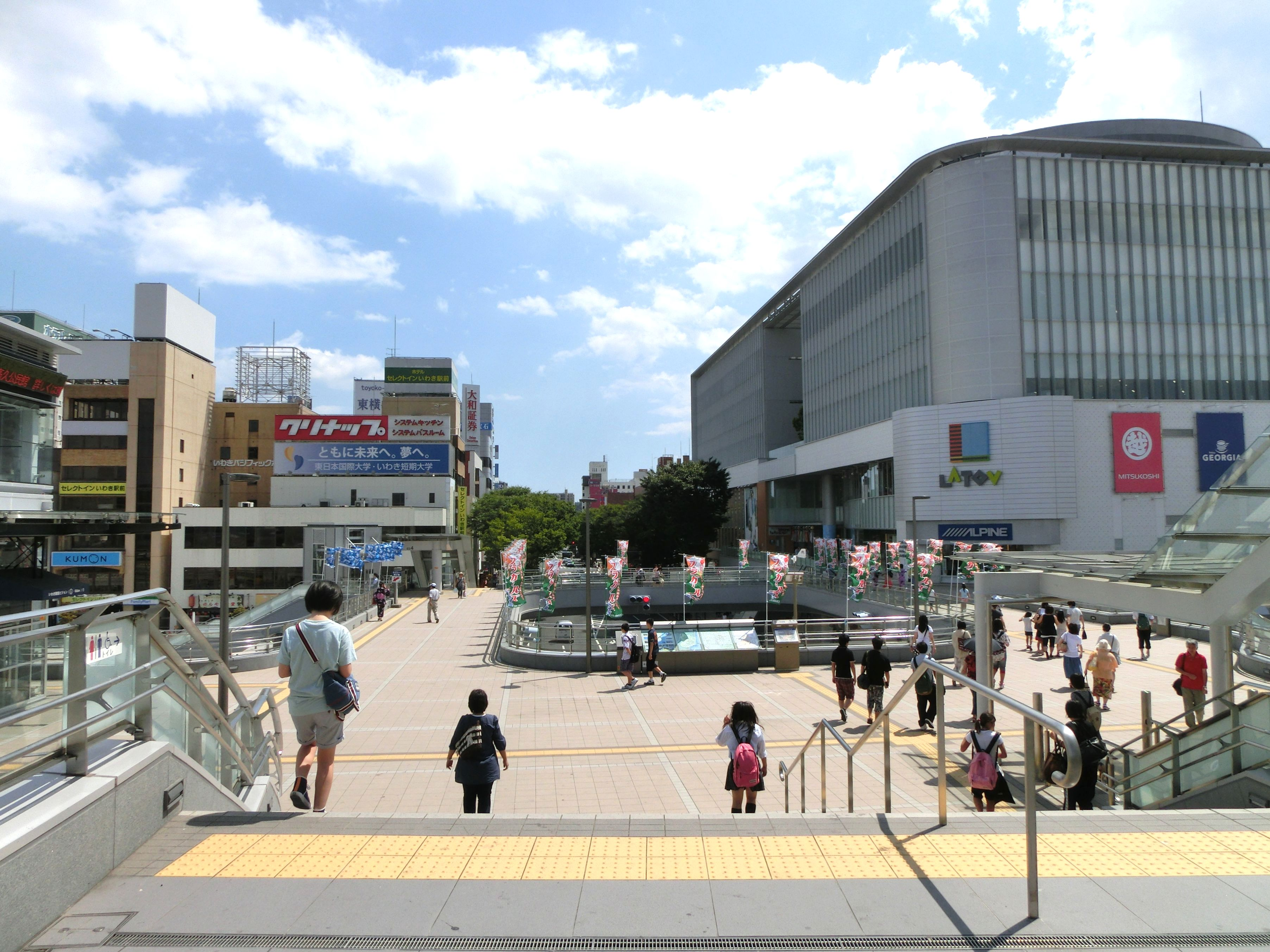
Looking south from Iwaki Station

JR East – Jōban Line

- Nakoso - Ueda - Izumi - Yumoto - Uchigō - Iwaki - Kusano - Yotsukura - Hisanohama - Suetsugi

JR East – Ban'etsu East Line

- Iwaki - Akai - Ogawagō - Eda - Kawamae

Fukushima Rinkai Railway Main Line (freight line)

- Izumi - Miyashita Freight Terminal - Onahama Freight Terminal

¤This line carries passenger only on the day of Onahama firework festival

=== Highway ===
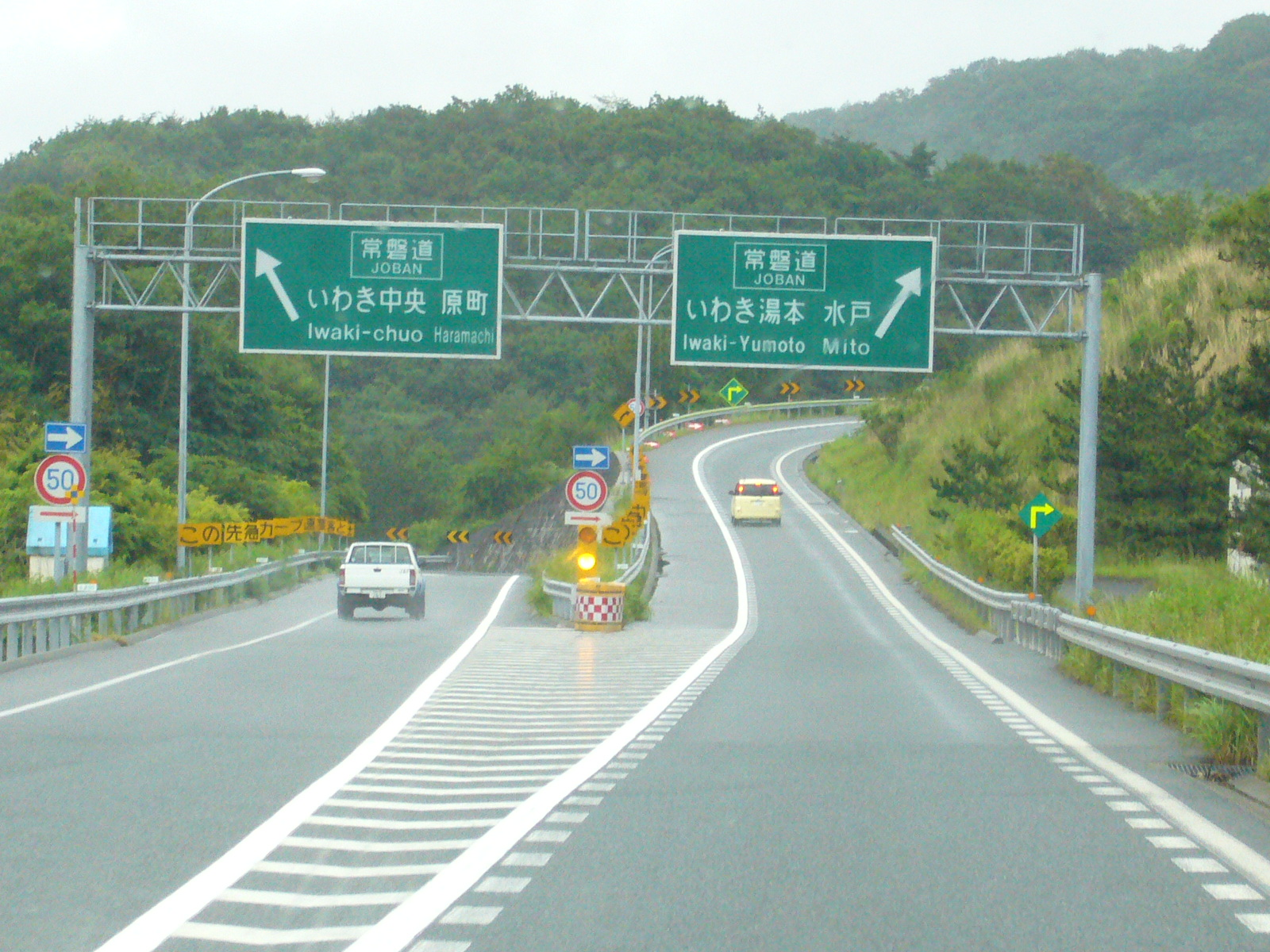
Iwaki JCT

- Jōban Expressway - Iwaki Nakoso Interchange - Iwaki Yumoto Interchange - Yunotake Parking Area – Iwaki Junction - Iwaki Chūō Interchange - Iwaki Yotsukura Interchange
- Ban-etsu Expressway - Iwaki Junction - Iwaki-Miwa Interchange
- National Route 6
- National Route 49
- National Route 289
- National Route 349
- National Route 399

=== Bus operators ===
==== City buses ====
- Shin Jōban Kōtsū

==== Highway buses ====
- Shin Jōban Kōtsū
- JR Bus Tōhoku
- JR Bus Kantō
- Tōbu Bus Central
- Fukushima Transportation
- Aizu Bus

=== Ports ===
- Onahama Port
- Nakanosaku Port
- Ena Port
- Hisanohama Port

=== Air ===
The nearest airport is Fukushima Airport which is located about 55 kilometres (34 mi) north west of the city.

=== Sport ===
Iwaki-Taira Velodrome is located within the city.

== Public institutions ==
=== Taira ===
- Iwaki City Hall (main)
- Iwaki Green Stadium
- Iwaki athletic field
- Iwaki civil pools
- Iwaki gymnasium
- Iwaki Velodrome
- Iwaki Lyceum "Alios"
- Iwaki cultural center
- Iwaki central library
- Iwaki museum
- Iwaki central park

=== Nakoso ===
- Nakoso branch office
- Iwaki Nakoso Lyceum

=== Uchigō ===
- Uchigō branch office
- Iwaki Uchigō Community Center

=== Onahama ===
- Onahama branch office
- Iwaki Onahama baseball ground
- Onahama civil pools
- Iwaki Onahama Lyceum
- Aquamarine Fukushima

=== Jōban (Yumoto) ===
- Jōban branch office
- The 21st-century forest park

Iwaki Green Stadium (capacity of 30,000)
Iwaki Green Field (soccer, rugby, football)

- Iwaki Jōban Lyceum
- Iwaki Coal and Fossils Museum

=== Others ===
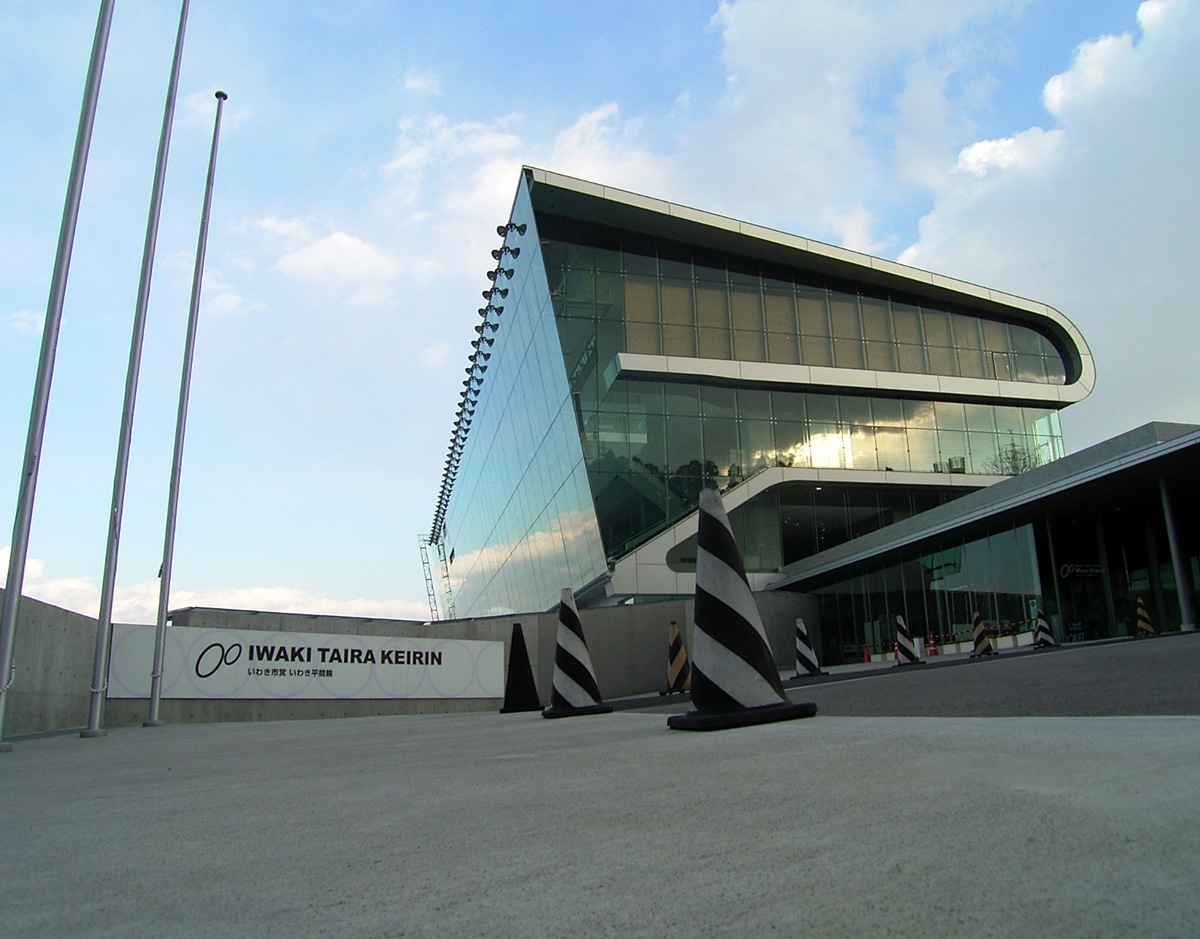
Iwaki bicycle racetrack

- Hisanohama and Ōhisa branch office
- Yotsukura branch office
- Kawamae branch office
- Ogawa branch office
- Yoshima branch office
- Miwa branch office
- Toyoma branch office
- Ena branch office
- Chūōdai service center
- Izumi branch office
- Ueda branch office
- Tabito branch office
- Tōno branch office
- Iwaki southern forest's sports park
- Kurashi no Denshōgō
- Kusano Shimpei Memorial
- Iwaki Anmonites Center

== Education ==
=== Universities and Colleges ===
- Fukushima National College of Technology
- Iryo Sosei University
- Higashi Nippon International University
- Iwaki Junior College

=== Senior high schools ===
Iwaki has 14 public high schools operated by the Fukushima Prefectural Board of Education. There is one private high school and three private combined middle/high schools. The prefecture also operates three special education schools within Iwaki.

Public (prefectural)

- Iwaki High School (磐城高等学校)
- Iwaki Sakuragaoka High School (磐城桜が丘高等学校)
- Iwaki Kōyō High School (いわき光洋高等学校)
- Iwaki Nōgyō High School (磐城農業高等学校)
- Iwaki Sōgō High School (いわき総合高等学校)
- Iwaki Kaisei High School (いわき海星高等学校)
- Iwaki Yumoto High School(いわき湯本高等学校)
- Taira Kōgyō High School (平工業高等学校)
- Taira Shōgyō High School (平商業高等学校)
- Nakoso High School (勿来高等学校)
- Nakoso Kōgyō High School (勿来工業高等学校)
- Onahama High School (小名浜高等学校)
- Yoshima High School (好間高等学校)
- Yotsukura High School (四倉高等学校)

Private

- Iwaki Shūei High School (いわき秀英高等学校)
- Shōhei High School (東日本国際大学附属昌平高等学校)
- Iwaki First High School (磐城第一高等学校)
- Iwaki Second High School (磐城第二高等学校)

=== Junior high schools ===
Iwaki has 39 public junior high schools. There are three private combined junior/senior high schools (listed above). The city also operates 67 public elementary schools.

Public (municipal)

- Taira First Junior High School (平第一中学校)
- Taira Second Junior High School (平第二中学校)
- Taira Third Junior High School (平第三中学校)
- Fujima Junior High School (藤間中学校)
- Toyoma Junior High School (豊間中学校)
- Kusano Junior High School (草野中学校)
- Akai Junior High School (赤井中学校)
- Yumoto First Junior High School (湯本第一中学校)
- Yumoto Second Junior High School (湯本第二中学校)
- Yumoto Third Junior High School (湯本第三中学校)
- Iwasaki Junior High School (磐崎中学校)
- Onahama First Junior High School (小名浜第一中学校)
- Onahama Second Junior High School (小名浜第二中学校)
- Izumi Junior High School (泉中学校)
- Ena Junior High School (江名中学校)
- Uchigō First Junior High School (内郷第一中学校)
- Uchigō Second Junior High School (内郷第二中学校)
- Uchigō Third Junior High School (内郷第三中学校)
- Ueda Junior High School (植田中学校)
- Ueda Higashi Junior High School (植田東中学校)
- Nishiki Junior High School (錦中学校)
- Nakoso First Junior High School (勿来第一中学校)
- Nakoso Second Junior High School (勿来第二中学校)
- Kawabe Junior High School (川部中学校)
- Katōno Junior High School (上遠野中学校)
- Iritōno Junior High School (入遠野中学校)
- Yotsukura Junior High School (四倉中学校)
- Ogawa Junior High School (小川中学校)
- Tabito Junior High School (田人中学校)
- Yoshima Junior High School (好間中学校)
- Nagai Junior High School (永井中学校)
- Miwa Junior High School (三和中学校)
- Misaka Junior High School (三阪中学校)
- Saiso Junior High School (差塩中学校)
- Kawamae Junior High School (川前中学校)
- Okeuri Junior High School (桶売中学校)
- Ojiroi Junior High School (小白井中学校)
- Hisanohama Junior High School (久之浜中学校)
- Tamagawa Junior High School (玉川中学校)
- Chūōdai Kita Junior High School (中央台北中学校)
- Chūōdai Minami Junior High School (中央台南中学校)

Closed schools:

- Ōno Junior High School (大野中学校) - It closed in 2023, with a final student population of three.

== Media ==
=== Television ===
- NHK Fukushima
- Fukushima Central Television (affiliated with Nippon TV)
- Fukushima Broadcasting (affiliated with TV Asahi)
- Fukushima Television Broadcasting (affiliated with Fuji)
- TV-U Fukushima (affiliated with TBS)

=== Newspapers ===
- Fukushima Mimpō (Fukushima, Mainichi)
  - Iwaki Mimpō
- Fukushima Min-Yū (Fukushima, Yomiuri)

=== Radio ===
- Sea Wave (cFM J-Wwave)

== Sister cities ==
=== Japanese sister cities ===
- (Japan) Nobeoka, Miyazaki since May 30, 1997
- (Japan) Yurihonjō, Akita, since August 10, 1986. Yurihonjō City includes old Iwaki town (岩城町), which has the same name, "Iwaki".

=== International friendship and sister cities ===
- Townsville, Queensland, Australia, sister city since August 21, 1991
- Fushun, Liaoning Province, China, friendship city since April 15, 1982
- Kauaʻi County, Hawaii, United States, sister city since 2011
  - {{flagdeco|Pakistan}} [[Wazirabad]], Pakistan

== Local attractions ==
- Iino Hachimangū Shinto shrine
- Iwaki Onahama Minato Oasis
  - Iwaki Sun Marina
  - Aquamarine Park
    - Aquamarine Fukushima, an aquarium
    - Iwaki La La Miu
    - Iwaki Day Crews
- Iwaki Marine Tower
- "Iwaki seven beaches"
- Shioyazaki lighthouse
  - Monuments of Misora Hibari

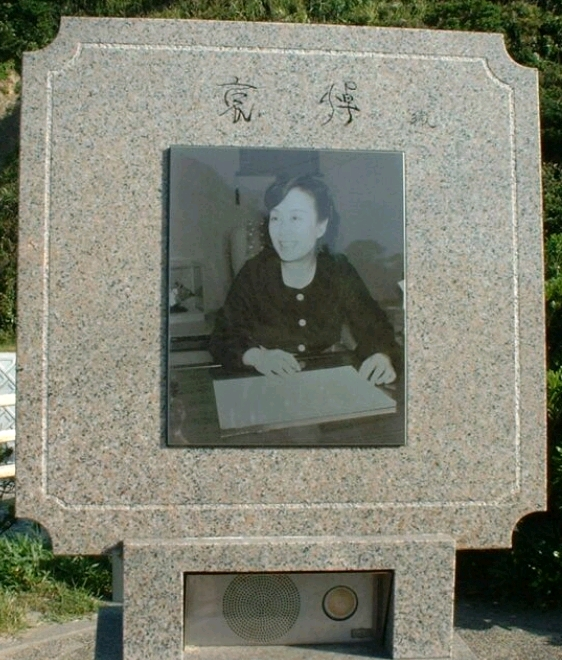
The Monument of Misora Hibari

- Setogarō, a scenic ravine, named by Kusano Shimpei
- Iwaki Yumoto Onsen, one of the three old hot springs in Japan
- Spa Resort Hawaiians, hot spring and leisure park.
- Iwaki Coal and Fossils Museum
- Nakoso Barrier, was built against Emishi in Yamato period. "Nakoso" means "Don't come over here".
- Iwaki Ammonites Center
- Shiramizu Amidadō, Buddhist temple. National Treasures of Japan.

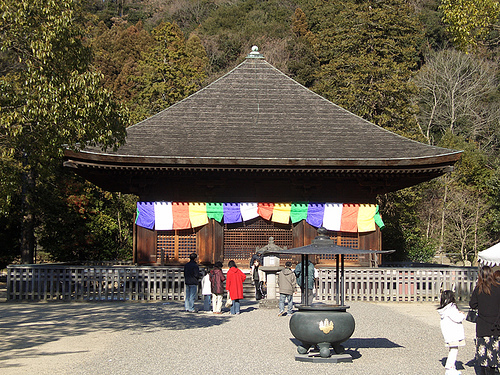
Shiramizu Amidadō

- Kurashi no Denshōgō, historical facility
- Iwaki Taira Keirin, cycle racetrack
- Kusano Simpei Memorial Hall

=== Festivals ===
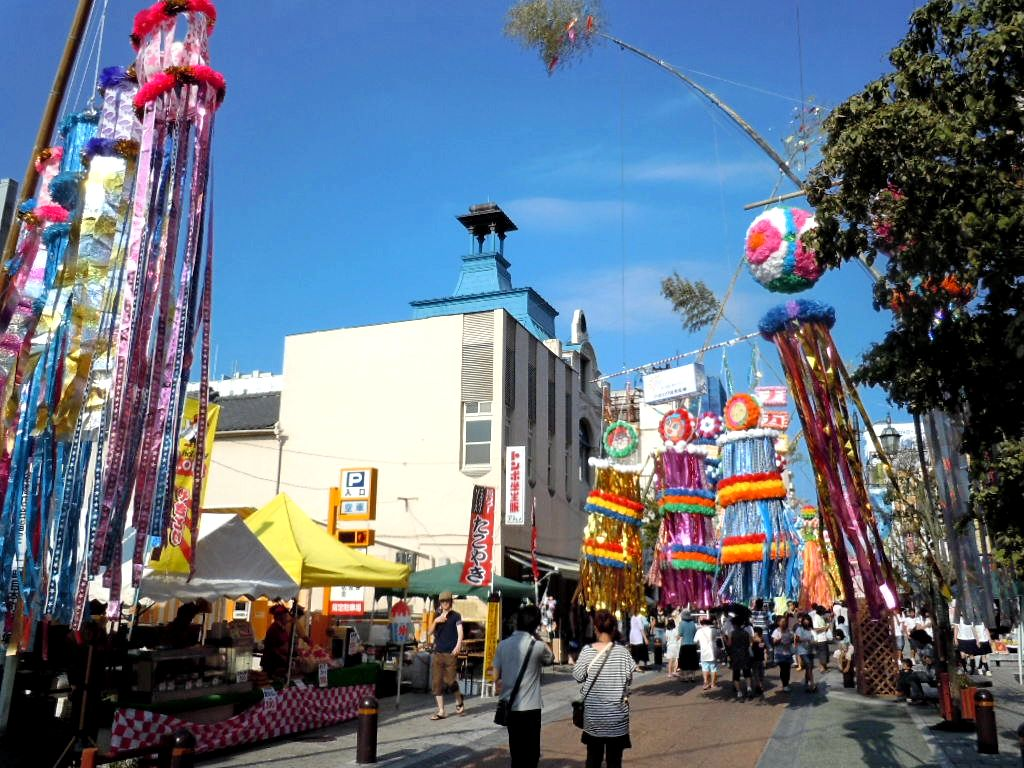
Taira Tanabata Festival, one of the most famous festivals for tanabata in Japan

- Jangara
- Iwaki Odori
- Onahama Firework Festival
- Taira Tanabata Festival

== In popular media ==
- The 2006 film Hula Girls won five awards in 2007 Japan Academy Prize

== Notable people from Iwaki ==
- Aya Okamoto, actress
- Denmei Suzuki, actor
- Ken-Ichiro Kobayashi, conductor
- Misaki Ito, actress
- Miyuki Komatsu, actress
- Noboru Kousaka, member of the House of Representatives of Japan for the Japan Socialist Party
- Rena Takeda, actress
- Shinpei Kusano, poet; famous as "poet of frogs"
- Shizuka Hangai, Paralympic judoka
- Tadashi Suzuki, discovered Futabasaurus suzukii
- Takeo Takagi, Imperial Japanese Navy Admiral
