= Iwaki Junior College =

Coordinates: 37°03′25″N 140°54′25″E

- いわき短期大学
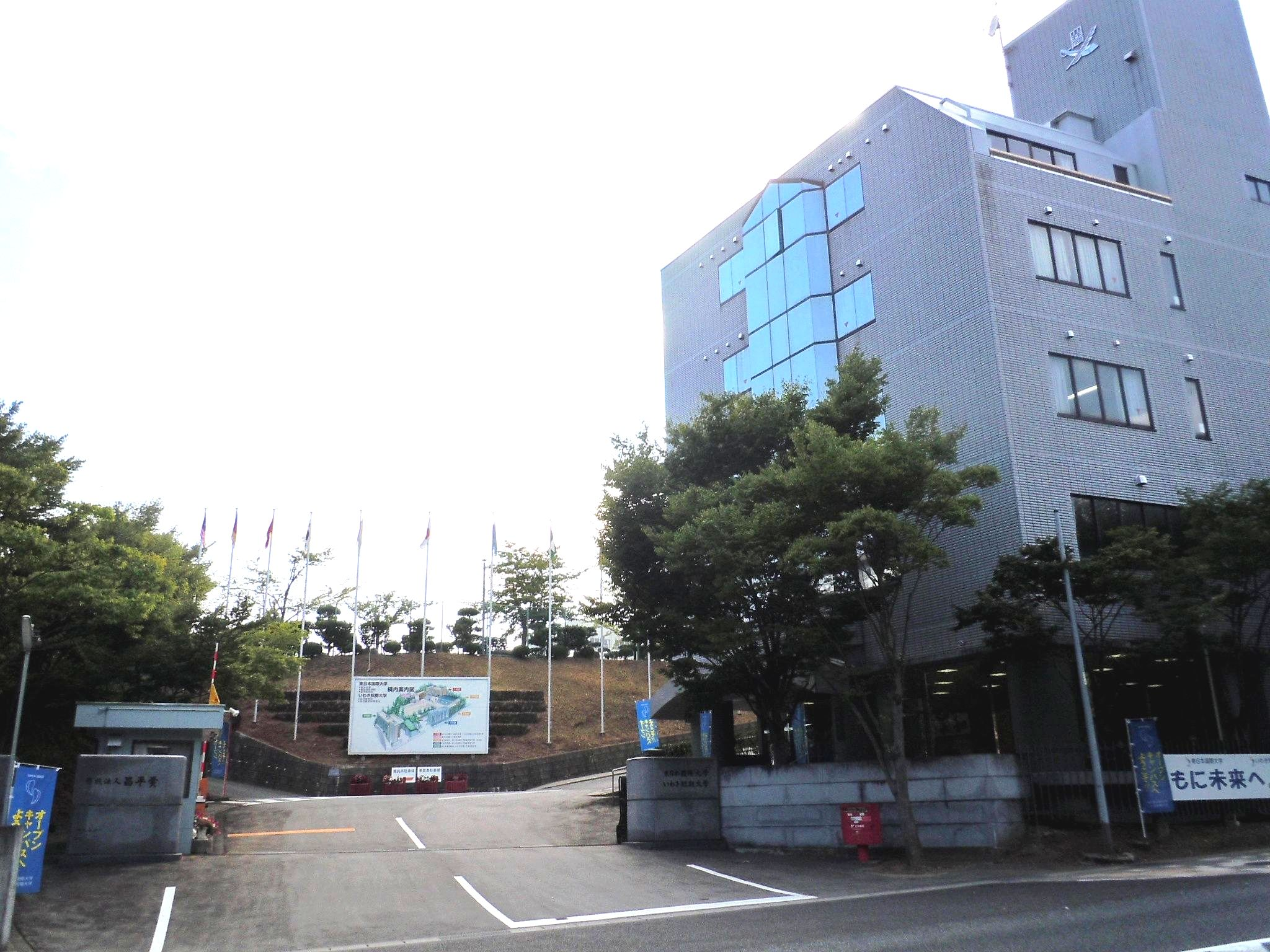
- Type: Private
- Established: 1966
- Location: Iwaki, Fukushima, Japan
- Website: Official website

Iwaki Junior College (いわき短期大学, Iwaki tanki daigaku) is a private junior college, located in the city of Iwaki, Fukushima, Japan.

== History ==
The school was established in 2007. The predecessor of the school was founded in 1966 as the Shoheiko Junior College. It changed its name to Iwaki Junior College in 1972.
