= Hula Girls =

2006 film by Lee Sang-il

- Theatrical release poster
- Directed by: Sang-il Lee
- Written by: Sang-il Lee; Daisuke Habara
- Produced by: Bong-Ou Lee; Hiroshi Kawai; Yoshiaki Hosono
- Starring: Yasuko Matsuyuki; Etsushi Toyokawa; Yū Aoi; Ittoku Kishibe; Sumiko Fuji
- Cinematography: Hideo Yamamoto
- Edited by: Tsuyoshi Imai
- Music by: Jake Shimabukuro
- Distributed by: Cinequanon
- Release dates: September 9, 2006 (TIFF); September 23, 2006 (Japan)
- Running time: 120 minutes
- Country: Japan
- Language: Japanese
- Box office: $9.5 million

Hula Girls (Japanese: フラガール, Hepburn: Fura gāru) is a 2006 Japanese comedy film directed by Sang-il Lee and co-written by Lee and Daisuke Habara, and first. Starring Yū Aoi, Yasuko Matsuyuki, Etsushi Toyokawa, Shizuyo Yamazaki, Ittoku Kishibe, Eri Tokunaga, Yoko Ikezu and Sumiko Fuji, it is based on the real-life event of how a group of enthusiastic girls take on hula dancing to save their small mining village, Iwaki, helping the formation of Joban Hawaiian Center (now known as Spa Resort Hawaiians), which was later to become one of Japan's most popular theme parks.

Hula Girls had its world premiere at the Toronto International Film Festival on September 9, 2006, and was released theatrically in Japan on September 23. The film was critically acclaimed upon release in Japan and received 12 nominations at the 2007 Japan Academy Awards, winning five awards: Best Film, Best Director, Best Screenplay, Best Supporting Actress (for Yū Aoi), and Most Popular Film. It also won two major awards at the 80th Kinema Junpo awards, including that of Best Film and Best Supporting Actress (for Aoi). Since its release in Japan, the film has been shown across theaters and film festivals worldwide. It was selected as the Japanese entry for the Best Foreign Language Film at the 79th Academy Awards, but it was not nominated.

== Plot ==
In 1965, the cold, northern coal mining town of Iwaki faces decline and crushing unemployment as cheaper oil quickly becomes the dominant energy source in Japan. To provide for its workers, the mining company develops a plan to use hot springs, which seeped into the mines, to provide heat for a "Hawaiian Center" spa resort. The plan is greeted with hostility by the conservative blue-collar miners, but the company recruits Madoka Hirayama (Matsuyuki) a down-on-her-luck dance instructor from Tokyo, to train local girls in the hula.

At first, only a small core group take the challenge. Sanae (Tokunaga) is worried that her widowed father will lose his job, and the ability to support the four kids. She convinces her lifelong best friend Kimiko (Aoi) to join her at the disastrous first meeting. After the rumor runs through attendees that they will be dancing topless, Sanae and Kimiko seem to be the only two listening to the assurances that the rumor is false, as dozens of their companions flee. The two girls are joined by Hatsuko (Ikezu), the organizer's secretary, and Sayuri (Yamazaki), a large clumsy girl.

Things go poorly as training begins, and a frustrated Hirayama nearly gives up, until the girls' enthusiasm persuades her to give the plan another try. Kimiko and her mother, Chiyo (Fuji), have an argument, which prompts the girl to leave home to stay at the school, but as training continues and local unemployment looms, some of the other girls come back and join the school.

On the day that Sanae's father is fired, he comes home to find her in Hawaiian costume and beats her. This outrages Hirayama, who attacks him. When he leaves town to search for better prospects, Sanae goes with him to take care of her siblings, after getting Kimiko, who has become the leader of the girls, to promise that she will keep going.

Crushed by the departure of her friend, Kimiko finds it impossible to maintain the focus needed in dancing but is told "the show must go on". She does not accept this until her brother (Toyokawa) tells her to see it through. She pulls herself together in time to join the publicity tour.

After a disastrous first performance in the tour, the girls come together as a team and the tour is a great success, until a mine accident in which Sayuri's father is gravely injured. Told of the accident just before the last planned performance, the troupe prepares to leave for home so they can care for their loved ones. Knowing that her father wants her to succeed, Sayuri begs for the chance to finish the tour. The bus pulls into town hours after Sayuri's father dies, and as distraught family and friends berate her, Hirayama claims responsibility for not returning immediately and prepares to leave only to be stopped by her students.

However, the imported palm trees for the resort's grand opening are threatened by cold weather. A package from Sanae arrives for Kimiko. Her mother, Chiyo, brings it to the dance studio, where she sees the skills her daughter has gained. Chiyo takes a job as a scrap collector to give her daughter the chance to live her dream. She even attends the opening night of the show, at which Kimiko wears the flower sent by Sanae.

The opening show is a great success, establishing the Joban Hawaiian Center as a tourist destination.

== Locations featured in film ==
- Fukushima Prefecture
  - Iwaki
  - Furudono, Ishikawa District
  - Spa Resort Hawaiians (actual spa resort located in Iwaki)
- Ibaraki Prefecture
  - Kitaibaraki
  - Takahagi
  - Nakaminato Station (located in Hitachinaka)

== Reception ==
=== Critical response ===
Hula Girls has an approval rating of 56% on review aggregator website Rotten Tomatoes, based on 18 reviews, and an average rating of 5.6/10. Metacritic assigned the film a weighted average score of 53 out of 100, based on 5 critics, indicating "mixed or average reviews".

=== Accolades ===
Hula Girls won several awards upon release, including five major awards at the 2007 Japan Academy Awards, including that of Best Film, Best Director, Best Screenplay, Best Supporting Actress (for Yū Aoi), and Most Popular Film. It also won Best Film and Supporting Actress award (for Aoi) at the 80th Kinema Junpō awards, held on January 9, 2007. At the 31st Hōchi Film Awards, held on November 28, 2006, it won the awards for Best Film and Supporting Actress, while at the 19th Nikkan Sports Awards, held on December 5, 2006, it won the awards for Best Film, Best Actress (for Yasuko Matsuyuki), Best Supporting Actress (for Sumiko Fuji) and Best New Talent (for Aoi). At the 61st Mainichi Film Awards, held on January 19, 2007, it won the awards for Best Supporting Actress (for Aoi) and Best Film. At the 49th Blue Ribbon Awards, it won the awards for Best Film, Best Actress (for Aoi) and Best Supporting Actress (for Sumiko Fuji). It was also chosen for Japan's entry for the 79th Academy Award for Best Foreign Language Film.

== Production notes ==
The dancers spent three months learning and becoming skilled in hula.

The character Madoka Hirayama is loosely based on Kaleinani Hayakawa, the original kumu hula at Joban, who stayed for 32 years, while also becoming the founder of the first hula school in Japan. Her work helped inspire the hula craze in Japan.

== See also ==
- Cinema of Japan
- List of submissions to the 79th Academy Awards for Best Foreign Language Film
- List of Japanese submissions for the Academy Award for Best Foreign Language Film
