= Palau International Coral Reef Center =

Research center in Koror, Palau

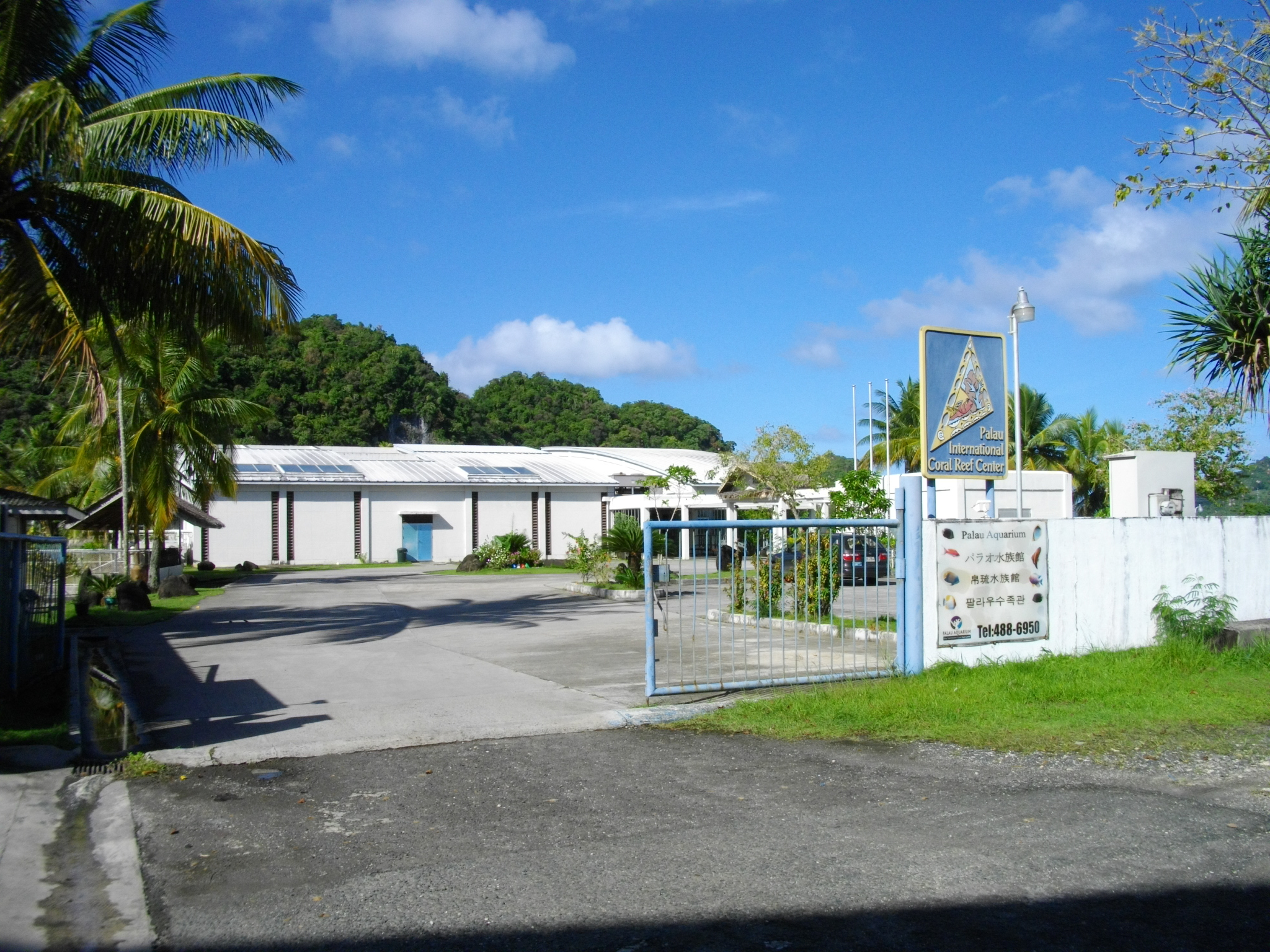
- Chair: Noah Idechong
- CEO: Yimnang Golbuu
- Location: Koror, Palau
- Coordinates: 7°20′19.4″N 134°27′59.6″E
- Interactive map of Palau International Coral Reef Center
- Website: Official website

The Palau International Coral Reef Center (PICRC) is a coral reef research center in Koror, Palau.

== Administration ==
The research center is currently headed by Yimnang Golbuu.

== Architecture ==
The center building features an aquarium, conference room, library, meeting rooms, gift shop etc.
