= Spa Resort Hawaiians =

Leisure complex in Iwaki, Fukushima, Japan

Coordinates: 36°59′37″N 140°48′59″E

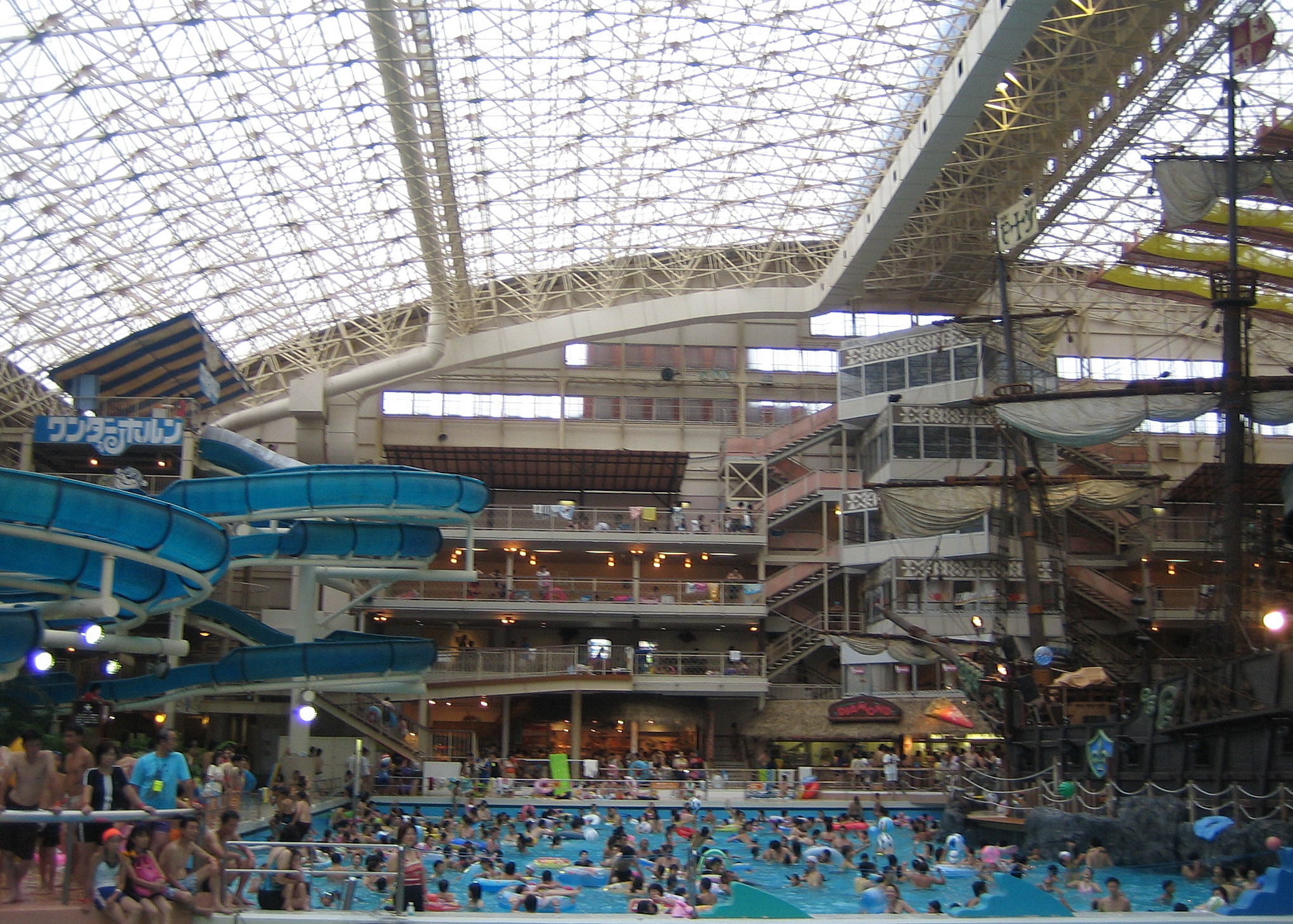
Spa Resort Hawaiians

Spa Resort Hawaiians (スパリゾートハワイアンズ), located in the city of Iwaki, Fukushima Prefecture, is a resort and theme park in Japan. It opened on January 15, 1966 as the Joban Hawaiian Center, becoming the first in the country.

== History ==
The resort was an outgrowth of the mining industry. The modern coal mining in the Joban coal field was started on the exposed areas of the coal field near the foot of the Abukuma mountains in 1883. By 1944 the Joban Mine had become Japan's largest mine due, in no small part, to the use of forced labour by Allied Prisoners of War. The Joban Tanko continued to flourish throughout the 1950s but as Japan's economy shifted from being powered by coal to oil in the 1960s, the owners realized that the mine's useful life was limited. Yutaka Nakamura, the vice president, was determined to extend the mine's life somehow, and hit upon the idea of using the area's hot springs, an inconvenience to the mines, to open a resort. He selected a Hawaiian theme.

One of the Resort's most well-known features is its dance troupe. Rather than inviting an outside troupe to perform, the company decided to create its own, and initially trained 18 employees' daughters. In the very close-knit mining community, entire families would work at the Resort. Nakamura intentionally kept the hotel small at the beginning, so the local ryokan would benefit from the increased business, and purchased as much as possible from local suppliers. Its popularity reached its peak in 1970–71, as attendance passed 1.55 million visitors per year.

In 1989, Joban Hawaiian Center received the Deming Application Prize, becoming the first leisure-industry company to win this quality control award. In 1990, it changed its name to Spa Resort Hawaiians, reflecting an increased focus on the spa facilities.

In 2004, it was the tenth most popular theme park in Japan, with 1.5 million visitors.

The resort was damaged by the 2011 Tōhoku earthquake and forced to close. While it was closed, its hula girls troupe toured Japan performing at earthquake refugee shelters and other venues. The resort reopened on 8 February 2012 with increased structural support and bigger stage for its hula girls show.

Iwaki lost 277 people from the 2011 earthquake and tsunami. Being farther from the sea, Spa Resort Hawaiians was not damaged by the initial quake and tsunami of March 11 but suffered damage from the aftershock a month later. More damaging still for the Joban Hawaiian Centre were the reactor explosions at the Fukushima Daiichi nuclear plant, which made many people reluctant to visit the resort due to the fear of radiation.

This triggered the memory of the owner of the Joban Hawaiian Centre, Mr. Saitou who accompanied the first Hula Girls all over Japan to promote the centre. He says this reputation is worse than closing the mine.

Mr. Satou has decided to revive tour of Hula Girls after 45 years to cheer people still living in shelters and to aid Fukushima's recovery.

Ex-Iwaki Hula Girls are also part of the project. They have decided to hold Japan Hula "high school" Girls Competition in Koushien, Osaka. After the quake, this project seemed to have fallen through but 13 high schools competed and moreover, they ran a campaign to raise funds for the event.

Earthquake repairs and renovations were finally completed in early 2012 and Spa Resort Hawaiians reopened completely on February 8, 2012.

== Parent company ==
Joban Kosan Co., Ltd.
- Type: Public KK
- Traded as: TYO: 9675
- Founded: 31 March 1944 (as 常磐炭礦株式会社)
- Headquarters: 〒972-8555 50 Warabidaira, Joban-Fujiwara, Iwaki, Fukushima (福島県いわき市常磐藤原町蕨平50番地), Japan
- Owners: Joban Kaihatsu (6.68%); Trust & Custody Services Bank (5.99%); The Master Trust Bank of Japan (2.52%); Sapporo Beer (2.19%); Mizuho Bank (2.15%); Meiji Yasuda Life (2.14%); Mizuho Trust Bank (2.08%); Joyo Bank (2.05%); Taiheiyo Cement (1.81%); Fuyo Generation Leasing (1.12%); Shochiku (1.07%); Furukawa Group (0.45%); Fuji Kyuko (0.41%); Okamoto (0.18%)
- Subsidiaries: Joban Seisakujo (98.0%); Joban Koun (98.1%); Kita-Ibaraki Farm (49.0%)
- Website: https://www.joban-kosan.com/

Joban Kosan is a Japanese company, which manages Spa Resort Hawaiians.

== In popular culture ==
The 2006 film Hula Girls was based on the story of the founding of the resort.

The resort is featured in the manga series Rent-A-Girlfriend, where it serves as the setting for the Paradise and My Girlfriend Arc. A collaboration between Rent-A-Girlfriend and Spa Resort Hawaiians, which celebrated the 60th anniversary of the resort, ran from September 13 to November 30, 2025. Sora Amamiya, Chizuru's Japanese voice actress, and Masayuki Akasaka, Kibe's Japanese voice actor, appeared at a special event to commemorate the collaboration on October 19. Yū Serizawa, Mini's Japanese voice actress, also promoted the collaboration on November 23. The resort promoted the fourth and fifth seasons of the anime adaptation.

The resort features heavily in the plot of the 2021 anime film Hula Fulla Dance, which was made to commemorate the tenth anniversary of the Tōhoku earthquake and tsunami.
