= Takako Matsu =

Japanese actress and pop singer-songwriter (born 1977)

- 松 たか子
- Born: Takako Fujima; June 10, 1977 (age 49); Tokyo, Japan
- Occupations: Actress; singer; songwriter
- Years active: 1993–present
- Agents: BMG Japan (1997–1998/2006–present) Universal Music Japan (1998–2005) BMG Japan (2006–2009); Ariola Japan/Sony (2009–)
- Spouse: Yoshiyuki Sahashi (m. 2007)
- Children: 1
- Parents: Matsumoto Hakuō II (father); Noriko Fujima (mother)
- Relatives: Matsumoto Hakuō I (grandfather); Nakamura Kichiemon I (grandfather); Nakamura Kichiemon II (uncle); Matsumoto Kōshirō X (older brother); Kio Matsumoto (sister); Sonoko Fujima (sister-in-law); Ichikawa Somegorō VIII (nephew); Mio Matsuda (niece); Ichikawa Danjūrō XIII (cousin)
- Musical career
- Genre: J-pop
- Website: matsutakako.jp

Takako Matsu (松 たか子, Matsu Takako) (born Takako Fujima (藤間 隆子, Fujima Takako) on June 10, 1977) is a Japanese actress and pop singer.

== Personal life ==
Matsu was born to a family of buyō and kabuki actors, including her father Matsumoto Hakuō II, her mother and businesswoman Noriko Fujima, her uncle, Nakamura Kichiemon II, her elder brother Matsumoto Kōshirō X, her sister Kio Matsumoto, and stage director Kazuhisa Kawahara. She married guitarist and record producer Yoshiyuki Sahashi on December 28, 2007. Her married name is Takako Sahashi (佐橋隆子, Sahashi Takako). She has the name of Natori of the Matsumoto school of Nippon Buyō (Japanese dancing); Shodai Matsumoto Kōka (初代 松本 幸華; "Kōka Matsumoto the First"). She chose the surname "Matsu" to honor the family. In an interview, she said she and her siblings are close to their mother.

== Career ==
Matsu starred in her stage debut Ninjō-banashi: Bunshichi Mottoi at Kabuki-za. Her first television role was in the NHK Drama Hana no Ran and starred in the NHK drama Kura. Because Shirayuri Gakuen, her high school, prohibited working in the industry, she moved to Horikoshi High School. Matsu starred in the drama Long Vacation after matriculating to college. She had a supporting role, but established in full-scale her position, because the drama was a major hit. She hosted the 47th NHK Kōhaku Uta Gassen and debuted with the single "Ashita, Haru ga Kitara". She returned to the show as a singer on the last day of the year. In an interview with NHK, Matsu recalled the incident with her musical debut. She sang karaoke which was heard by the director who suggested she gave a song. Although she declined it and was not confident enough with the song, she accepted because she saw it as "[a] chance that not everyone got".

In the same year, she starred in the drama Love Generation in a leading role. She starred in Hero. She published a photo essay book, Matsu no Hitorigoto, through Asahi Shimbun Publishers. She released "Toki no Fune" in September 2004, which was composed by Akeboshi. It is similar to the song, "A nine days' wonder", which was released after the "Toki no Fune" single. The single contained a cover of Akeboshi's "White Reply" previously recorded on her sixth album, Harvest Songs.

Matsu won the Best Actress of the Year of the 29th Hochi Film Award and the 28th Japan Academy Prize at the same time for The Hidden Blade. In July 2006, she and Takuya Kimura starred in a special one-night edition of Hero. In October 2006, Matsu and Makoto Fujita starred in a weekly drama Yakusha Damashii. Matsu left the third concert tour in May 2007 to commemorate her tenth year as a singer. In her album Cherish You, the song "Ashita Haru ga Kitara" was redone to combine her voice on her youth.

On November 27, 2014, Matsu revealed on her official website that she was pregnant with her first child. Her daughter was born on March 30, 2015, and weighed 3466 grams. On February 9, 2020, Matsu was called to join Idina Menzel, Aurora and eight more of Elsa's international dubbers to perform the song "Into the Unknown" at the 92nd Academy Awards. Every international performer sang one line of the song in a different languages, including Maria Lucia Rosenberg, Willemijn Verkaik, Carmen Sarahí, Lisa Stokke, Katarzyna Łaska, Anna Buturlina, Gisela and Wichayanee Pearklin. Matsu worked with the producers. Her third album, Sakura no Ame, Itsuka was released at Universal Music.

== Filmography ==
=== Film ===
Year	Title	Role	Notes	Ref.
1997	Tokyo Fair Weather	Mizutani		
1998	April Story	Uzuki Nireno	Lead role	
2003	9 Souls	Yuki		
2004	The Hidden Blade	Kie		
2006	Suite Dreams	Hana Takemoto		
2006	Brave Story	Wataru (voice)	Lead role	
2007	Tokyo Tower: Mom and Me, and Sometimes Dad	Mizue		
2007	Hero	Maiko Amamiya		
2008	K-20: Legend of the Mask	Yoko Hashiba		
2009	Villon's Wife	Sachi	Lead role	
2010	Confessions	Yuko Moriguchi	Lead role	
2011	Someday	Mie Orii		
2012	Dreams for Sale	Satoko Ichizawa	Lead role	
2014	The Little House	Tokiko Hirai	Lead role	
2015	Hero	Maiko Amamiya		
2017	Fireworks	Nazuna's mother (voice)		
2018	Hard-Core	Bar woman		
2018	The Miracle of Crybaby Shottan	Yoshiko		
2018	It Comes	Kotoko Higa		
2019	Masquerade Hotel	Maki Nagakura		
2020	Last Letter	Yuri Kishibeno	Lead role	
2022	The Pass: Last Days of the Samurai	Osuga		
2022	The Zen Diary	Machiko		
2025	1st Kiss	Kanna Suzuri	Lead role	
2025	On Summer Sand	Keiko		
2026	Nagi Notes	Yoriko Endo	Lead role	

=== TV dramas ===
Year	Title	Role	Notes	Ref.
1994	Hana no Ran	Tsubaki	Taiga drama	
1996	Furuhata Ninzaburō	Saki Mōri	Episode 21	
1996	Long Vacation	Ryoko Okusawa		
1996	Hideyoshi	Cha-cha	Taiga drama	
1997	Under the Same Roof	Miki Mochizuki	Season 2	
1997	Love Generation	Riko Uesugi	Lead role	
1997	Ryoma Goes	Sanako Chiba	Television film	
1998	Jinbē	Miku Takanashi		
2000	Match Making	Setsuko Nakatani	Lead role	
2001	Hero	Maiko Amamiya		
2001	Chūshingura 1/47	Aguri (Yōzen-in)	Television film	
2003	The Always the Two of Us	Mizuho Tanimachi	Lead role	
2005	Hiroshima, August 6, 1945	Shinobu Yajima	Lead role; television film	
2009–11	Clouds Over the Hill	Tami Akiyama		
2012	Man of Destiny	Yuriko Yuminari		
2014	Father's Back	Hitomiko Higuchi	Episode 1	
2017	Quartet	Maki Maki	Lead role	
2019	No Side Manager	Maki Kimishima		
2021	My Dear Exes	Towako Omameda	Lead role	
2025	Their Marriage	Nella Suzuki		
2026–27	Blossom	Yuko Fujikawa	Asadora	

=== Japanese dub ===
Year	Title	Role	Notes	Ref.
2013	Frozen	Elsa		
2015	Frozen Fever	Elsa		
2017	Olaf's Frozen Adventure	Elsa		
2018	Ralph Breaks the Internet	Elsa		
2019	Frozen II	Elsa		

=== Television ===
Year	Title	Role	Notes	Ref.
1996	The 47th Kōhaku Uta Gassen	Red team host		
1997	The 48th Kōhaku Uta Gassen	Contestant		
1999	The 50th Kōhaku Uta Gassen	Contestant		
2017	The 68th Kōhaku Uta Gassen	Contestant		

=== Video games ===
Year	Title	Voice role	Notes	Ref.
2019	Kingdom Hearts III	Elsa		

== Theater ==
- Ninjō-banashi: Bunshichi Mottoi (人情噺文七元結, Real-life story: Bunshichi paper cord for tying the hair) (Kabuki-za, 1993) - Ohisa
- Koiki na Yūrei (小粋な幽霊, a Stylish Ghost) (Shinbashi Enbujō, 1994) - Botan
- Ajisai (あぢさゐ, Hydrangea) (Shinbashi Enbujō, 1994) - Omitsu
- Taki no Shiraito (滝の白糸, the White Thread in the Waterfall) (Shinbashi Enbujō, 1994) - Kikyō
- Jyunsaihan (じゅんさいはん) (Shinbashi Enbujō, 1994) - Oume
- Man of La Mancha
  - (Aoyama Theater 1995) (Meitetsu Hall/ Aoyama Theatre, 1997) (Theater Hiten/ Aoyama Theatre, 1999) - Antonia
  - (Hakata-za/ Imperial Garden Theater, 2002), (Meitetsu Hall/ Imperial Garden Theater, 2005), (Imperial Garden Theater, 2008), (Theater Brava!, 2009) - Aldonza
- Hamlet (Ginza Cezon Theater 1995, 1998, etc.) - Ophelia
- Tengai no Hana (天涯の花) (Shinbashi Enbujō, 1999) - Tamako Taira
- The Good Person of Szechwan (New National Theater, 1999/ Akasaka ACT Theater 2001) - Shen Te/ Shui Ta
- Okepi (Aoyama Theatre, 2000) - Shinonome
- Voyage ~Senjō no Syanikusai~ (〜船上の謝肉祭〜, ~Carnival on the ship~) (Theater Cocoon, 2000) - (lead role)
- Natsu Hoteru (夏ホテル, Summer Hotel) (Parco Theater 2001) - Kaoru
- Wuthering Heights (Shinbashi Enbujō, 2002) - Catherine Earnshaw
- Mozart! (Nissei Theater; 2002) - Constanze Mozart
- Noda Map: Oil (Theater Cocoon, 2003/ Kintetsu Theater 2003) - Fuji
- Ohatsu (おはつ) (Shinbashi Enbujō, 2004) - Ohatsu
- Roningai (Aoyama Theatre, 2004) - Oshin
- Miss Saigon (Imperial Garden Theater, 2004) - Kim
- The Caucasian Chalk Circle (Setagaya Public Theater, 2005) - Gursha
- Noda Map: Fake Crime and Punishment (Theater Cocoon 2005–6, Theater Brava!, 2005–6) - Hanabusa Sanjo
- Metal Macbeth (Matsumoto Performing Arts Centre/ Aoyama Theatre/ Osaka Kosei Nenkin Kaikan, 2006) - Mrs. RandomStar
- Hibari (ひばり, Skylark) (Theater Cocoon, 2007) - Joan of Arc
- Romance (Setagaya Public Theater, 2007) - Maria Chekhova
- Sisters (Parco Theater, 2008) - Kaoru Ozaki
- Noda Map: Piper (Theater Cocoon, 2009) - Deimos
- Jane Eyre (Nissei Theater, 2009, 2012) - Jane Eyre
- Futari no Otto to Watashi no Jijou (2人の夫とわたしの事情, Family reason of my two husbands and me) (Original title: Home and Beauty) (Theater Cocoon, 2010) - Victoria
- Twelfth Night (Theater Cocoon, 2011) - Sebastian/ Viola
- Oto no Inai Sekai de (音のいない世界で, In the world without the sound) (New National Theatre, 2012–2013) - Sei
- Motto Naiteyo Flapper (もっと泣いてよフラッパー, Cry More, Flapper) (Theater Cocoon, 2014) - Trunk Jill
- Kagami no kanata wa tanaka no naka de (かがみのかなたはたなかのなかで) (New National Theatre, 2015, 2017–2018) - Keiko
- Noda Map: Gekirin (逆鱗, Wrath) (Tokyo Metropolitan Theatre, 2016) - Ningyo(Mermaid)
- Metropolis (Theater Cocoon, 2016) - Maria/ Parody
- Sekai wa hitori (世界は一人)(Tokyo Metropolitan Theatre, 2019) - Miko Tanaka/ Kazue Mori
- Noda Map: Q: A Night At The Kabuki (Tokyo Metropolitan Theatre, 2019) - Sore kara no Julie(Juliet)
- Inubito-Inujin-(イヌビト犬人)(New National Theatre, 2020) - Guide / Mazda Takeko / Petit
- Pa Lapa Pan Pan (COCOON PRODUCTION 2021+大人計画『パ・ラパパンパン』2021) - novelist for teens

== Awards and nominations ==
Year	Award	Category	Work(s)	Result	Ref.
1997	21st Elan d'or Awards	Newcomer of the Year	Herself	Won	
1997	22nd Hochi Film Awards	Best New Artist	Tokyo Fair Weather	Won	
2004	29th Hochi Film Awards	Best Actress	The Hidden Blade	Won	
2005	28th Japan Academy Film Prize	Best Actress	The Hidden Blade	Nominated	
2008	31st Japan Academy Film Prize	Best Supporting Actress	Tokyo Tower: Mom and Me, and Sometimes Dad	Nominated	
2009	34th Hochi Film Awards	Best Actress	Villon's Wife	Won	
2009	22nd Nikkan Sports Film Awards	Best Actress	Villon's Wife	Won	
2010	33rd Japan Academy Film Prize	Best Actress	Villon's Wife	Won	
2010	83rd Kinema Junpo Awards	Best Actress	Villon's Wife	Won	
2011	34th Japan Academy Film Prize	Best Actress	Confessions	Nominated	
2013	34th Yokohama Film Festival	Best Actress	Dreams for Sale	Won	
2013	36th Japan Academy Film Prize	Best Actress	Dreams for Sale	Nominated	
2017	7th Confidence Award Drama Prizes	Best Actress	Quartet	Won	
2025	38th Nikkan Sports Film Awards	Best Actress	1st Kiss	Nominated	
2026	68th Blue Ribbon Awards	Best Actress	1st Kiss	Nominated	
2026	49th Japan Academy Film Prize	Best Actress	1st Kiss	Nominated	

== Discography ==
=== Studio albums ===
- Sora no Kagami (1997)
- Ai no Tobira (1998)
- Itsuka, Sakura no Ame ni... (2000)
- A Piece of Life (2001)
- Home Grown (2003)
- Harvest Songs (2003)
- Bokura ga Ita (2006)
- Cherish You (2007)
- Time for Music (2009)
- Ashita wa Doko kara (2017)

=== Compilation albums ===
- Five Years: Singles (2001)
- Takako Matsu Single Collection 1999–2005 (2006)
- Footsteps: 10th Anniversary Complete Best (2008)

=== Live albums ===
- Takako Matsu Concert Tour Vol. 1 "A Piece of Life" (2002)
- Takako Matsu Concert Tour 2003 "Second Wave" (2004)

=== Music Video/Concert DVD ===
- film Sora no Kagami (1997)
- Film Itsuka, Sakura no Ame ni... (2000)
- MATSU TAKAKO concert tour vol.1 "a piece of life" on film (2002)
- 「tour documentary film "diary"」〜 concert tour vol.1 "apiece of life"〜 (2002)
- matsu takako concert tour 2003 "second wave" on film (2004)
- MATSU TAKAKO concert tour 2007 "I Cherish You" on film (2007)
- Takako Matsu Concert Tour 2010 "Time for Music" (2010)

== Bibliography ==
Title	Original publication date	Publisher	Category
Matsu no Hitorigoto (松のひとりごと; "Matsu's Soliloquy")	November 14, 2003 (October 7, 2009)	Asahi Shimbun Publications	Independent book (paperback)
Chichi to Musume no Ōfukushokan (父と娘の往復書簡; "Correspondence between father and daughter") (with Kōshirō Matsumoto)	October 10, 2008 (January 10, 2011)	Bungeishunjū	Independent book (paperback)
