= Maria Lucia Rosenberg =

Danish singer and musical-performer (born 1984)

Maria Lucia Heiberg Rosenberg
- Born: Maria Lucia Rosenberg; 9 February 1984 (age 42)
- Origin: Copenhagen, Denmark
- Genres: Alternative, pop rock
- Instrument: Singing
- Years active: 2001–present

Maria Lucia Heiberg Rosenberg (born 9 February 1984) is a Danish voice actress, singer, and musical-performer. She became famous when she won a record contract with the label EMI in the TV 2-program Popstars in 2003. Her debut single "Taking Back My Heart" (2004) was no. 1 on hitlisten. The album That's Just Me sold 22.000 copies.

== Career ==
She has been singing since age 8 when she started her music career with a minor role in Bugsy Malone. Her father was Per Rosenberg (d. in 2009), an elementary school teacher. Her mother is Karin Heiberg Christensen, a film editor.

Her Danish maternal grandfather, Poul Heiberg Christensen (1918–2010) was director of SAS, consul of Denmark in Munich and opponent. He was appointed Knight of the Order of the Dannebrog, First Class. Her maternal grandmother, Lucya, was Polish.

She sang some time in the band "Rosenberg," whose driving force is her father. The family home where she grew up is located in Risskov.

Maria Lucia created a career as a musical singer with leading parts in Skønheden og udyret (English: Beauty and the Beast) on the Det Ny Teater, Aladdin in Fredericia Teater (later on Copenhagen Opera House in Copenhagen) and West Side Story on Gasværket. On 8 May 2011 she was awarded Reumertprisen as singer of the year for her role in Wicked (one of two non-replicated versions of the show) on Det Ny Teater, the first musical performer to receive this prize.

She participated in the TV show Vild med Dans in 2013 and danced with Morten Kjeldgaard. In 2013 she also dubbed Elsa for the Disney film Frozen, performing the Danish version of the song "Let It Go" ("Lad det ske"), which won an Oscar on 2 March 2014. Rosenberg was chosen for the part also because she played the role of Elphaba in Wicked, which in the Broadway-version was originally played by Idina Menzel, who voices Elsa in original version. Between 2011 and 2014 Danmarks Radio held a series of concerts in different locations in Denmark where famous Disney songs were performed by DR UnderholdningsOrkestret, DR VokalEnsemblet and artists such as Stig Rossen, Annette Heick, Henrik Launbjerg, Monique, Jesper Asholt, Thomas Meilstrup and Pelle Emil Hebsgaard.

Since 2017, her partner has been the Swedish singer and producer Albin Fredy Ljungqvist. They live in Vesterbro. Their son, Per Albin Fredy, was born on 27 June 2020 at Rigshospitalet.

On 9 February 2020, her birthday, Maria Lucia was called to join Idina Menzel, Aurora and eight more of Elsa's international dubbers to perform the song “Into the Unknown” during the 92nd Academy Awards while being pregnant with Per. Every international performer sang one line of the song in a different language: Maria Lucia in Danish, Willemijn Verkaik in German, Takako Matsu in Japanese, Carmen Sarahí in Latin American Spanish, Lisa Stokke in Norwegian, Kasia Łaska in Polish, Anna Buturlina in Russian, Gisela in European Spanish and Gam Wichayanee in Thai.

In 2026 she's set to reprise her role as Elsa in the Danish production of the stage musical adaptation of Frozen, together with Anna's original Danish dubber Kristine Yde Eriksen. The Danish production is set to premier on 12 February 2026.

== Theatre ==
Year	Show	Role	Location
2005	Beauty and the Beast	Belle	Det Ny Teater
2006	West Side Story	Maria	Østre Gasværk Theater
2007	Lyset over Skagen	Marie Krøyer	Denmark Tour starting in Skagen
2008	Olsen Banden og den Russiske Juvel	Anastasia	Tivoli's concert hall
2008	The Wild Party	Kate	Gladsaxe Ny Teater
2009	Elsk mig i nat	Iben	Østre Gasværk Theater
2009	Les Misérables	Eponine	Det Ny Teater
2011	Wicked	Elphaba	Det Ny Teater
2011	Some Like It Hot	Sugar Kane	Folketeatret
2012	Chess	Florence	Aarhus Teater
2012	Elsk mig i nat	Iben	Musikhuset Aarhus
2012–2013	Aladdin	Jasmine	Fredericia Teater & Copenhagen Opera House
2013	Shrek	Fiona	Forum Copenhagen
2014	Beauty and the Beast	Belle	Det Ny Teater
2015	The Sound of Music	Maria	Det Ny Teater
2016	Pillars of the Earth	Aliena	Østre Gasværk Theater
2017	Chicago	Roxie Hart	Det Ny Teater
2017	Annie Get Your Gun	Annie Oakley	Det Ny Teater
2018/2019	Ghost	Molly	Chinateatern & Vicky Nöjesproduktion
2020	Den Skaldede Frisør	Astrid	The One and Only Company
2021	Waitress	Jenna	Det Ny Teater
2022	She Loves You	Louise	Tivolis Koncertsal, KBH & Musikhuset Aarhus
2023	Gotta Dance!		Copenhagen Opera House & Det Kongelige Teater
2023	Så som i himmelen	Gabriella	Copenhagen Opera House & Det Kongelige Teater
2026	Frozen	Elsa	Falkonersalen
2026	Olivia	Kristine	Østre Gasværk Teater

== Filmography ==
Year	Title	Role	Notes
2013	Frozen	Elsa	Danish dubbing
2015	Frozen Fever	Elsa	Danish dubbing
2016-2023	Miraculous: Tales of Ladybug & Cat Noir	Marinette Dupain-Cheng	Danish dubbing
2016	Get Santa	Såfina	Danish dubbing
2017	Olaf's Frozen Adventure	Elsa	Danish dubbing
2018	Ralph Breaks the Internet	Elsa	Danish dubbing
2019	Frozen 2	Elsa	Danish dubbing
2020	Over the Moon	Chang'e	Danish dubbing
2023	Ladybug & Cat Noir: The Movie	Marinette Dupain-Cheng	Danish dubbing

== Awards ==
- Prince Joachim and Princess Alexandra Foundation Award (2007).
- Reumertprisen (2011).
- Theatre Cup (2015).
