= Yellow Moon =

Yellow Moon may refer to:

- Yellow Moon (Neville Brothers album), 1989, or the title song
- Yellow Moon (Don Williams album), 1983, or the title song
- Yellow Moon (EP), a 2006 EP by Akeboshi, or the title song
- "Yellow Moon", a 1961 song by The Viscaynes

== See also ==
- The Yellow Moon Band, an English band
