= Lisa Stokke =

Norwegian actress and singer

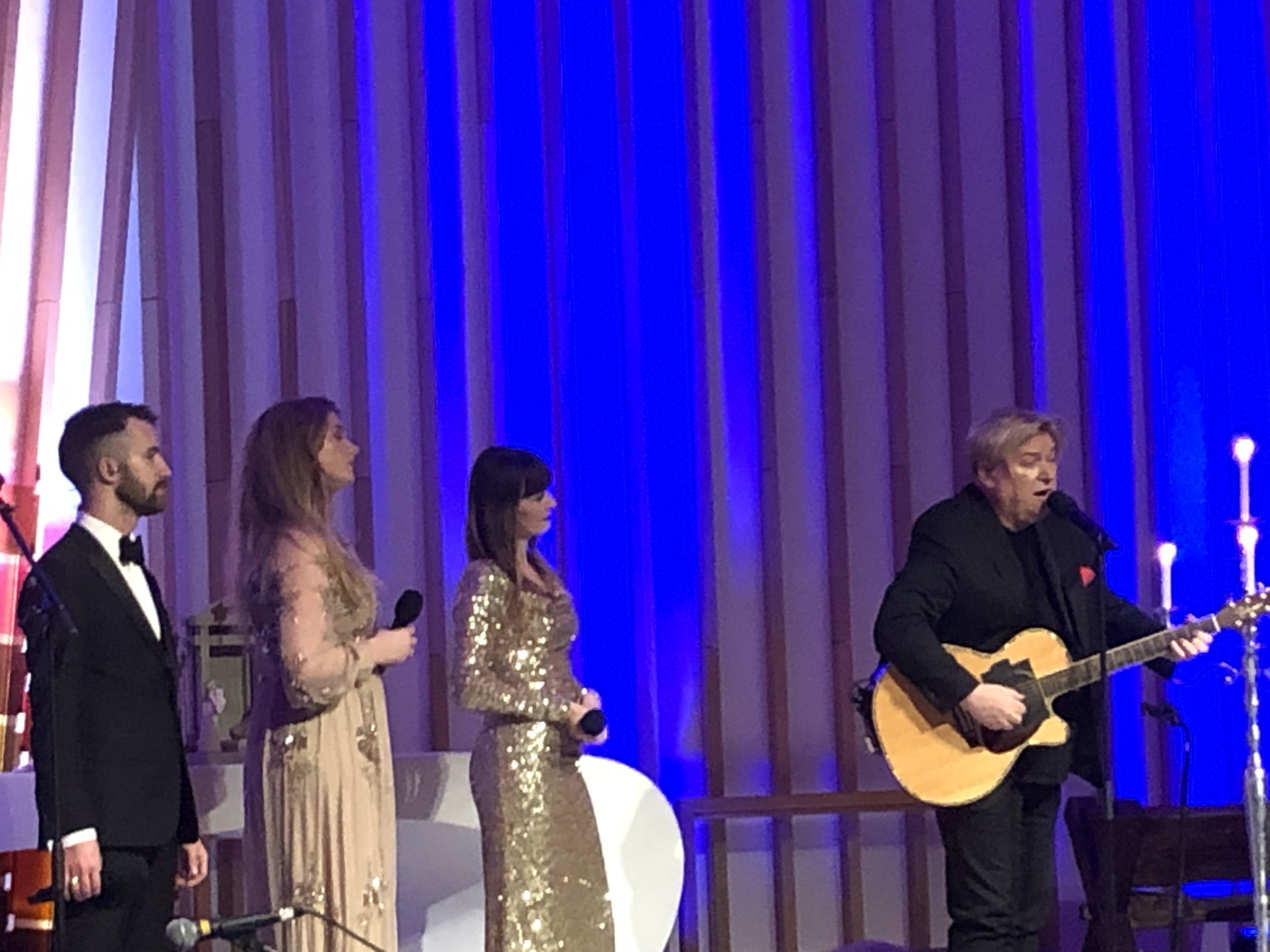
- Emil Solli-Tangen, Lise Mæland, Lisa Stokke and Jørn Hoel, in Hønefoss church, 2019.
- Born: 25 March 1975 (age 51); Tromsø, Norway
- Education: Liverpool Institute for Performing Arts
- Occupations: Actress, singer
- Years active: 1998–present
- Spouse: Tim Jolly (m. 2002)
- Children: Jasper and Tallulah

Lisa Stokke (born 25 March 1975) is a Norwegian singer and actress, active in Norway and the UK. She appeared in the original West End-staging of the musical Mamma Mia!, and appeared in Guys and Dolls and in the UK television series Jonathan Creek.

== Acting career ==
Lisa Stokke was born in the Arctic town of Tromsø in Northern Norway to a chiropractor father, Øivind Stokke (he was from Nordmøre; and died by suicide in 2004). Her American mother, Judith Rae, was born in 1949 in Arkansas, and is an artist and writer. She has an older sister, Monica. They grew up in Tromsdalen and their later parents divorced.

Stokke is from Tromsø, and was in the first class ever to graduate from LIPA, Paul McCartney's school in Liverpool, in 1998. Just four months after finishing her final exams, she was cast in the leading role of Sophie in the original West End production of the ABBA musical Mamma Mia!. She remained a part of the cast for only a year after having been on stage around 400 times. She moved on to appear in West End productions Guys and Dolls, Chess and Hard Times.

Following the success of Mamma Mia! and other stage shows Stokke has appeared in various guest roles on British and Norwegian television, musical shows and films, in addition to leading roles on stage in Norway. She appeared in one episode of the British detective series Jonathan Creek, playing Jodee Tressky in the episode "Satan's Chimney". She also starred in the Norwegian film Long Flat Balls II.

In 2010, she appeared in her own documentary series entitled Lisa Goes To Hollywood, portraying her search for a role in Hollywood. The series was broadcast on NRK.

In the Norwegian language dub of Disney's Frozen and Frozen II, she provides the voice of Elsa.

On December 2, 2018, she guest-starred in the BBC1 hit series Doctor Who in the eleventh series episode "It Takes You Away".

Stokke lives in Battersea, London, with her family. Her mother also moved to London.

== Music ==
Her performance in Mamma Mia! is included on the original cast recordings from 1999. She also contributed to the Help! I'm a Fish film soundtrack.

She released her first solo album, A Piece of Lisa in 2006.

She was the voice and singing voice of Elsa in the Norwegian dub of Frozen, Frost, she sang the Norwegian rendition of "Let it Go", "La Den Gå". In Frozen II, Frost II in Norwegian, she sang the Norwegian rendition of "Into the Unknown", "I ukjent land".

On February 9, 2020, Stokke was called to join Idina Menzel, Aurora and eight more of Elsa's international dubbers to perform “Into the Unknown” during the 92nd Academy Awards. Every international performer sang one line of the song in a different language: Maria Lucia Heiberg Rosenberg in Danish, Willemijn Verkaik in German, Takako Matsu in Japanese, Carmen Sarahí in Latin American Spanish, Stokke in Norwegian, Kasia Łaska in Polish, Anna Buturlina in Russian, Gisela in European Spanish and Gam Wichayanee in Thai.

== Other work ==
Stokke has been featured in commercials for Norwegian football betting and Ottakringer beer.

In the summer of 2005, Stokke hosted the Mandela concert, in support of the South African HIV/AIDS cause, in her hometown of Tromsø.

== Awards ==
- Citizen of Tromsø of the year (1999).
