= Katarzyna Łaska =

Kasia Łaska
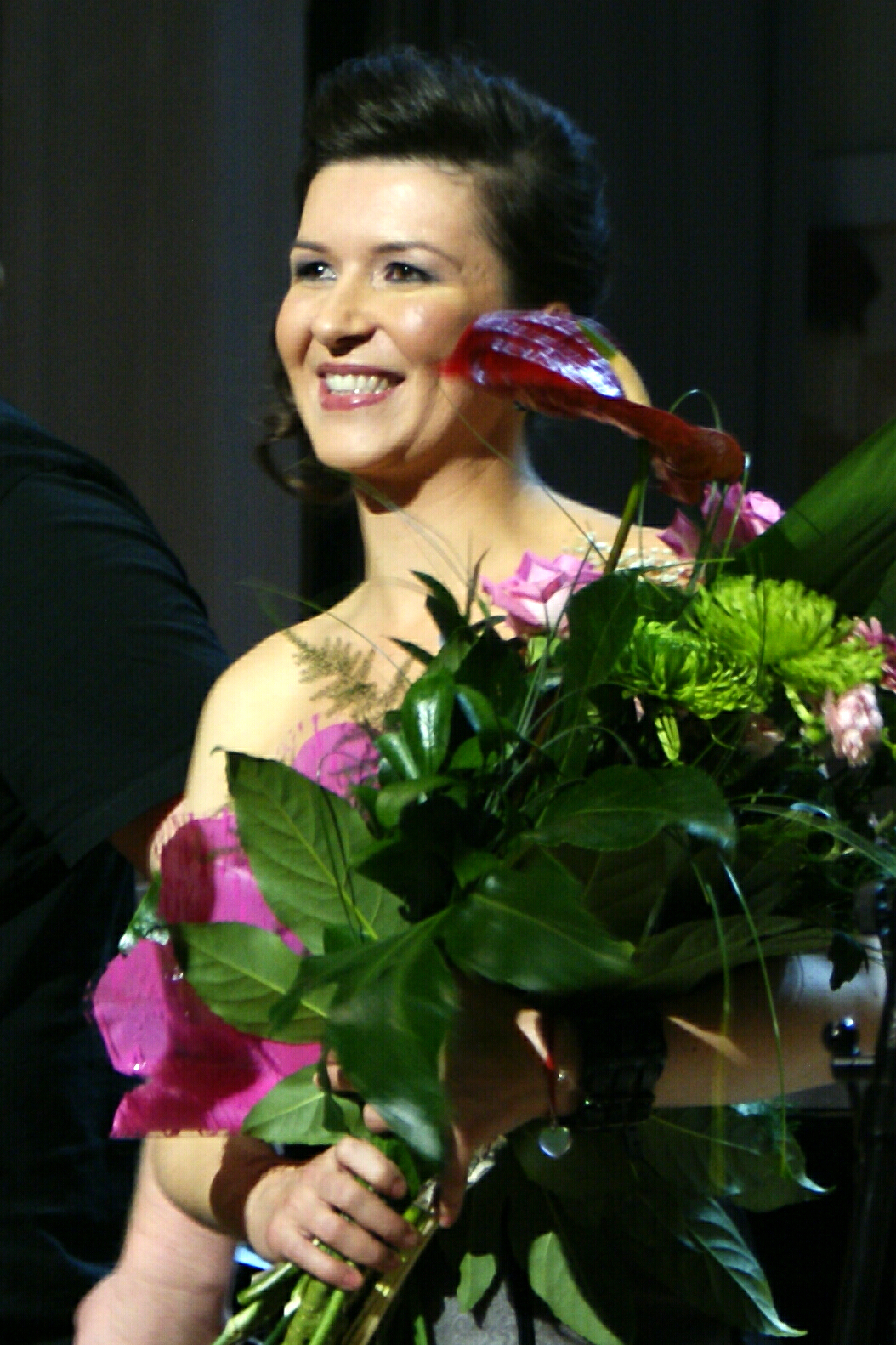
- Kasia Łaska during Jon Lord Concerto for Group and Orchestra in Warsaw – 10 November 2010.

Background information
- Born: Katarzyna Łaska; 26 May 1979 (age 47); Tomaszów Mazowiecki, Poland
- Occupations: Singer, voice actress
- Years active: 1995–present
- Website: kasialaska.com

Katarzyna Łaska (born 26 May 1979), known professionally as Kasia Łaska, is a Polish singer, who is best known from the Musical Theatre Roma where she starred in the lead role of Kim in the musical Miss Saigon, adult Wendy in the musical Peter Pan and Frenchy in the musical Grease. She also played Maria in the musical West Side Story at the Musical Theatre Capitol in Wrocław.

Łaska has also lent her voice to Polish versions of several animated films and cartoons.

Among her TV roles are Daring Do and Princess Cadance in My Little Pony: Friendship is Magic, Pearl in Steven Universe, and Katie in the Canadian cartoon Total Drama Island.

Łaska played the singing voice of Elsa, the Snow Queen in performing "Let It Go" (in Polish as "Mam tę moc") in the Disney animated film Frozen and its sequel, Frozen II where Kasia sings "Chcę uwierzyć snom", the Polish version of "Into the Unknown" made popular by Panic! At the Disco.

On 9 February 2020, Łaska was called to join Idina Menzel, Aurora and eight more of Elsa's international voiceovers to perform the song "Into the Unknown" during the 92nd Academy Awards. Every international performer sang one line of the song in different languages: Maria Lucia Heiberg Rosenberg in Danish, Willemijn Verkaik in German, Takako Matsu in Japanese, Carmen Sarahí in Latin American Spanish, Lisa Stokke in Norwegian, Łaska in Polish, Anna Buturlina in Russian, Gisela in European Spanish and Gam Wichayanee in Thai.

== Dubbing ==
- My Little Pony: Friendship is Magic – Princess Cadance
- Winx Club: The Secret of the Lost Kingdom – Musa
- Winx Club 3D: Magical Adventure – Musa
- Winx Club – Tecna (Specials 1-4, Season 3 (Nickelodeon version) and Seasons 4, 5, 6 and 7), Chimera, Digit and Mielle (ZigZap)
- Winx Club: The Mystery of the Abyss – Tecna
- H_{2}O: Just Add Water – Theme music performer, Emma (voice)
- Frozen – Elsa (singing voice)
- Steven Universe – Pearl, Yellow Pearl, Blue Pearl.
- Tweenies – Fizz
- The Backyardigans – Tasha
- High School Musical – Martha Cox
- Frozen Fever – Elsa (singing voice)
- Total Drama – Katie and Ella
- Olaf's Frozen Adventure – Elsa (singing voice)
- Spider-Man: Into the Spider-Verse & Spider-Man: Across the Spider-Verse - Rio Morales
- Frozen II – Elsa (singing voice)
- Beauty and the Beast – Background vocals
- Over the Moon – Chang'e
- The Swan Princess II: Escape from Castle Mountain - Odette [TV dubbing]

== Concerto for Group and Orchestra ==
In 2008, Kasia met Jon Lord (Deep Purple) and he asked her to sing as a soloist in his Concerto for Group and Orchestra project for the next four years. They performed together in Germany, Luxembourg, Switzerland, Brazil, Korea, United Kingdom, Bulgaria, Russia, Ukraine, Hungary, Italy, France, and in her home city Warsaw.

Kasia was a guest at the 2011 British premiere of Jon Lord Live (recorded live in 2009) from the Concerto for Group and Orchestra concert in Romania.

Jon invited Kasia to sing on his final album of Concerto for Group and Orchestra (new studio version) from Abbey Road Studios. She featured along with Steve Balsamo, Joe Bonamassa, Darin Vasilev, Bruce Dickinson (Iron Maiden), Steve Morse (Deep Purple) and Guy Pratt (Pink Floyd). The album premiered worldwide in September 2012.

In November 2013, Kasia released the first single "For my love" from her solo music project SIRLI.

== Personal life ==
For several years she was associated with the actor Mateusz Damięcki. She is currently married and has a son, Henryk (born in 2016), and lives in Warsaw.
