= Carmen Sarahí =

Mexican singer

- Born: Carmen Sarahí García Sáenz; June 29, 1981 (age 45); Nuevo Laredo, Tamaulipas, Mexico
- Genres: Pop, Rhythm and blues
- Occupation: Singer
- Instrument: vocals
- Years active: 2004–present

Carmen Sarahí García Sáenz is a Mexican singer and actress.

== Career ==
Carmen Sarahí was born in Nuevo Laredo, Tamaulipas, Mexico. She is a graduate of the Televisa Arts Education Center. She has faced soap operas such as Rubí, Rebelde, Mujer de madera, Palabra de mujer, Ni contigo ni sin ti, El Juramento (Telemundo), and programs like SOS: Sex and other secrets, Como dice el dicho, La rosa de Guadalupe and Decades, where she was part of the musical group Decadance. She was part of the Guzmán team in the program La Voz (Mexico) where he was participating in the third season, reaching the Knockouts where he was defeated by Carolina Ross.

Sarahí has recorded voices for movies and cartoons. The most well-known work - in animated films Disney, where she voiced Elsa in Frozen and Frozen II. She performed the Latin American Spanish version of the song "Let It Go" (Libre soy) from the movie Frozen and of the song "Into the Unknown" (Mucho más allá) from the movie Frozen II.

On February 9, 2020, Carmen Sarahí was called to join Idina Menzel, Aurora and eight more of Elsa's international dubbers to perform the song "Into the Unknown" during the 92nd Academy Awards. Every international performer sang one line of the song in a different language: Maria Lucia Heiberg Rosenberg in Danish, Willemijn Verkaik in German, Takako Matsu in Japanese, Carmen Sarahí in Latin American Spanish, Lisa Stokke in Norwegian, Kasia Łaska in Polish, Anna Buturlina in Russian, Gisela in European Spanish and Gam Wichayanee in Thai.

== Personal life ==
She married José Enrique Dávila on 8 November 2014. They have two children.
