= Wichayanee Pearklin =

Thai actress, singer and host (born 1989)

- วิชญาณี เปียกลิ่น
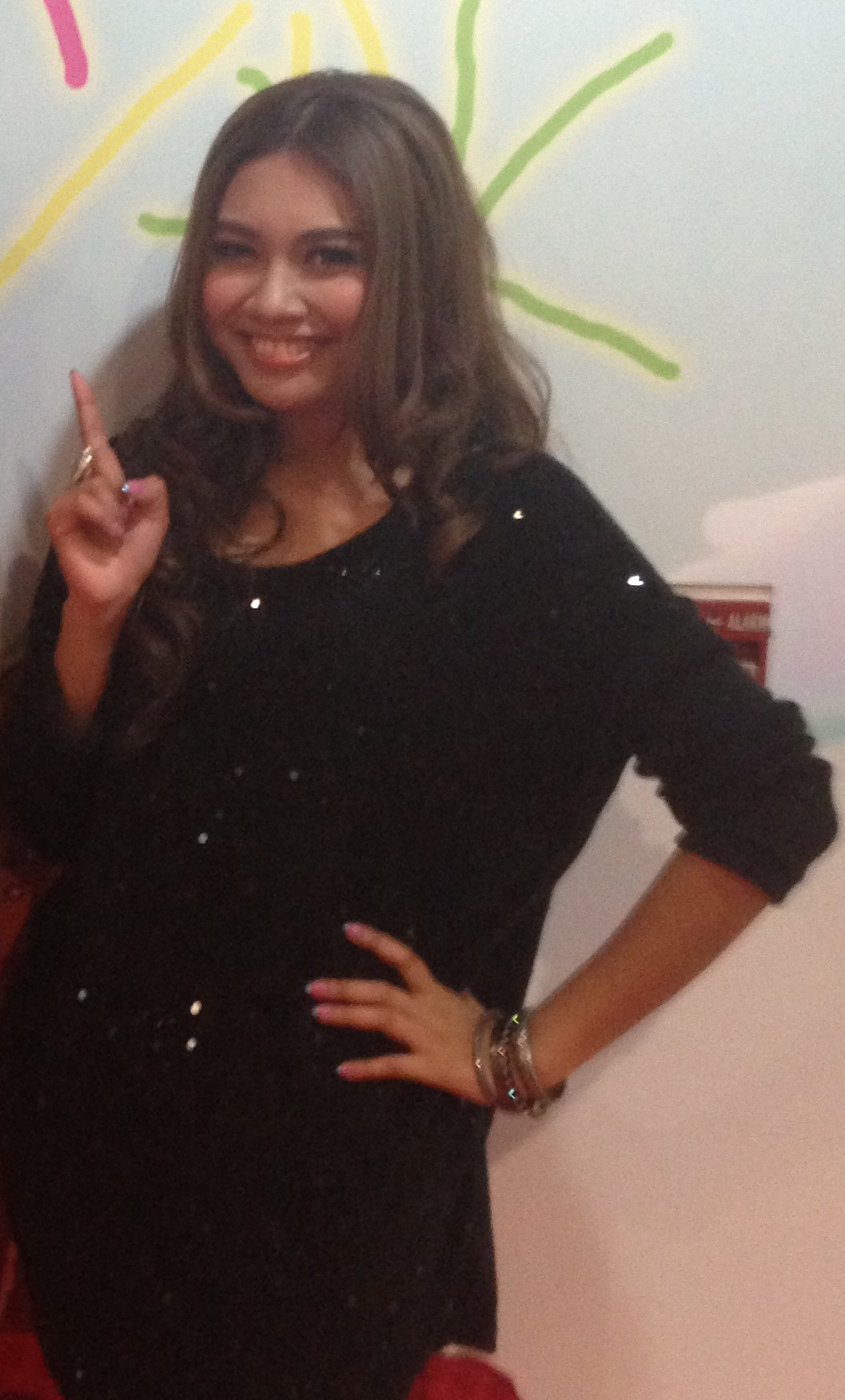
- Wichayanee in 2013
- Born: 21 September 1989 (age 37); Phatthalung, Thailand
- Other names: Gam; Gam The Star; Gam Wichayanee
- Education: Silpakorn University
- Occupations: Singer; actress; model; host; MC; YouTuber
- Years active: 2008–present
- Musical career
- Genres: Pop; R&B; jazz
- Instruments: Vocals; Piano
- Label: GMM Grammy

Wichayanee Pearklin (Thai: วิชญาณี เปียกลิ่น), also known as Gam Wichayanee, Gam The Star, or simply Gam (born September 21, 1989), is a Thai actress, singer, and television host. Wichayanee is the "Most Admired Female Singer in Modern Thai Music", according to Suan Dusit Poll in 2018, surveying Thai people around Thailand. She is also regarded by the Thai media as the "Female Artist with Outstanding Powerful Voice" or the "Powerful Diva" and has been awarded various accolades, including the National Outstanding Youth Award and Most Popular Female Artist Award. Wichayanee was firstly known to the Thai public as the first female winner who won popular votes from Thai people in The Star Season 4 (2008), the first singing talent reality show in Thailand. She is widely known for voicing Elsa and singing "Let It Go" in the Thai localization of Disney's animation film Frozen – she also voiced Elsa and sang "Into the Unknown" in the Thai version of Frozen II.

Wichayanee is recognized for her strength in singing technique, and emotional performance. She is able to sing in many genres, from pop, R&B, jazz to Thai country, and in many languages, including Thai, English, and Korean.

== Early life ==
Wichayanee was born in 1989 in Phatthalung, Thailand then moved to Phuket in 1995 to live with her younger sister Jinnapak Pearklin and her mother Yada Pearklin, who worked as a nurse. Wichayanee was able to sing when she was three years old. During the first year at her primary school, she won a singing competition for the first time, and when she was in her third year, she was selected to be a lead singer of the school's music band and practiced singing difficult Thai country songs to improve her singing skills. Her mother brought Wichayanee to participate in numerous contests in various events, where Wichayanee usually won the first prizes.

Wichayanee furthered her high school education at Satree Phuket School and joined “The Star” Season 4 in 2008. She won the talent show and signed a contract with the label Exact, under GMM Grammy, the largest media conglomerate entertainment company in Thailand. Then she began her singing career in Thai modern music. After winning The Star, she passed a direct examination to further her bachelor's degree at the Faculty of Music, Silpakorn University and graduated in 2013. Wichayanee presently lives with her sister in Bangkok while her mother is still working in Phuket.

== Entertainment career ==
Wichayanee released her first single "Kwam Pook Pan Sue Kwam Rak Mai Dai (Relationship Can't Buy Love)" in May 2008 and her first album GAM in October 2008. She first sang an original soundtrack named "Sang Lae Ngao (Light and Shadow)" for a TV drama and received a Diamond Song Award from the Ministry of Culture. In 2009, she debuted her musical play as a supporting actress in Jukebox Musical. Wichayanee was cast by Disney to voice Tiana in the Thai version of the animation The Princess and the Frog.

Wichayanee released her second album Baby It's You in 2011. In 2012 she acted in Rak/Jap/Jai The Romantic Musical where her song "Kong Tai Tee Yak Hai Jai" gained a second Diamond Song Award from the Ministry of Culture. In 2013, she joined various significant projects, including voicing the Thai version of Queen Elsa in Disney's animation film Frozen, and was selected by the Royal Thai Government to perform at the Official Ceremony Commemorating King Bhumibol Adulyadej at the Royal Thai Government House.

In 2015, Wichayanee was a television host for the first time for a variety show See Podum (Four Spades), and has been a judge and commentator in many singing talent TV programs. She was also a contestant in the Mask Singer (Thailand) Season 3 in 2017.

On 9 February 2020, Wichayanee was called to join Idina Menzel, Aurora and eight more of Elsa's international dubbers to perform the song "Into the Unknown" during the 92nd Academy Awards. Every international performer sang one line of the song in a different language: Maria Lucia Heiberg Rosenberg in Danish, Willemijn Verkaik in German, Takako Matsu in Japanese, Carmen Sarahí in Latin American Spanish, Lisa Stokke in Norwegian, Kasia Łaska in Polish, Anna Buturlina in Russian, Gisela in European Spanish and Gam in Thai.

On 19 August 2026, Channel 3 announced that Wichayanee was one of the 10 competing artists selected to compete in Thailand’s Chosen One.

== Music ==
=== Single ===
- "ความผูกพัน (ซื้อความรักไม่ได้)" (2008)

"กันเอง" - With กัน นภัทร (2011) "เมื่อสองเราได้พบกัน" (2012) "ของตายที่อยากหายใจ" - From the musical รักจับใจ เดอะโรแมนติกมิวสิคัล (2012) "กลัวความห่างไกล" - With โดม จารุวัฒน์ (2013) "เลือกได้ไหม" - With อ๋อง เขมรัชต์ (2014) "รักของฉันนั้นคือเธอ "- รวมศิลปินเดอะสตาร์ (2014) "ได้ยินไหมคำว่ารัก" (2014) "หนึ่งนาทีที่ไม่เหลือใคร" - GAM & The Angels (แก้ม, มุก, ซิลวี่, นัท เดอะสตาร์) (2015) "เรา" - 4 โพดำ (แก้ม, กัน, โดม, ตั้ม) (2016) "ฝืน" - With บูม ปรัตถกร From หาคู่ DUET (television programs) (2017) "เธอกลับมาเพื่อหมุนเข็มนาฬิกาให้เดินกลับหลัง" - 4 โพดำ (2018) "ขอบคุณกันและกัน" - 4 โพดำ (2018) "ไม่มีเธอ ไม่ตาย" (Feat. TWOPEE) (2018) "30 สิแจ๋ว"- OLAY&JOOX (2019) "รักไปทำไม" (2019) "Flame" (2023) "ไม่เหมือนตอนมีเธอ" (2024) "Share" (2025) "หัวใจปลอดภัยดี" - With Marr Team (2025)

=== Ost. ===
- 2008 (แสงและเงา) - (เงาอโศก)
- 2008 (มีแค่หัวใจ) - (สกุลกา)
- 2008 (แล้วฉันจะรักเธอได้อย่างไร) - (สกุลกา)
- 2010 (นอกสายตา (Ver. ลูกทุ่ง)) - (หัวใจพลอยโจร)
- 2010 (โทรหาครั้งสุดท้าย) - (หัวใจพลอยโจร)
- 2010 (นักร้องบ้านนอก) - (หัวใจพลอยโจร)
- 2010 (แค่คำคำเดียว) - (มาลัยสามชาย)
- 2011 (ไม่เหลืออะไรเลย) - (ตลาดอารมณ์)
- 2011 (เพิ่งรู้ตัวเอง) - (เงาพราย)
- 2013 (กามเทพ) - (มารกามเทพ)
- 2013 (อีสา) - (อีสา)
- 2014 (ที่หนึ่งในหัวใจเธอ) - (สงครามนางงาม)
- 2016 (ขอบฟ้าไม่มีจริง) - (ลายหงส์)
- 2017 (ไม่มีใครยอมใคร) (Together With Ravisrarat Pibulpanuvat) - (ชิงรัก ริษยา)
- 2017 (ใกล้แค่ลมหายใจ) - (ตะวันยอแสง)
- 2017 (น้ำตาหยดสุดท้าย) - (ล่า)
- 2017 (ทางเดินแห่งรัก) - (นางสาวไม่จำกัดนามสกุล)
- 2019 (ถ้าเลือกได้) - Krong Kam (กรงกรรม)
- 2019 (ปรุง) - (อรุณา 2019)
- 2019 Bai Mai (ใบไม้) - Bai Mai Tee Plid Plew (ใบไม้ที่ปลิดปลิว)
- 2019 (รักไปทำไม) - Song Kram Nak Pun 2 (สงครามนักปั้น 2)
- 2020 (ปลอม (FAKE)) - (เนื้อใน)
- 2021 (ได้ยินไหมคำว่ารัก) - (ทางเสือผ่าน)
- 2021 (บทเรียนของความเชื่อใจ) - Wake Up Ladies: Very Complicated (Wake Up ชะนี Very Complicated)
- 2021 (มากไปใช่ไหม) - (สองเสน่หา)
- 2021 (ขอยอม) - Game of Outlaws (เกมล่าทรชน)
- 2021 We're alright () - (กะรัตรัก)
- 2022 (ไม่อยากให้เธอจากไปไหน) - Wela Kammathep (เวลากามเทพ)
- 2022 (แค่กอด) - My Queen (รักสุดท้ายยัยจอมเหวี่ยง)
- 2022 (ฉันยังคิดถึง) - Poot Mae Nam Khong (ภูตแม่น้ำโขง)
- 2024 (ลบ) - Mini series Deep Blue สัมผัสที่เหงา
- 2024 (หยาดเพชร) -The Loyal Pin ปิ่นภักดิ์
- 2024 (ความรัก ความฝัน ความจริง) -(Song from the series ทิชา)

== Performance ==
=== Television ===
- 2008 (ความลับของ Superstar) (/Channel 5) as Gam Wichayanee (cameo)
- 2010 (หัวใจพลอยโจร) (/Channel 5) as Khan Jai
- 2014 (น่ารัก) (/Channel 5) as Chee Phong
- 2014 Songkram Nang Ngarm (สงครามนางงาม) (/One 31) as Gam Wichayanee (cameo)
- 2015 Ngao Jai (เงาใจ) (/One 31) as Tibby
- 2019 Song Kram Nak Pun Season 2 (สงครามนักปั้น Season 2) (/One 31) as Gam Wichayanee (cameo)

=== Series ===
- 2013 Club Friday The Series 2 ตอน คนดีที่เธอไม่รัก (/Green Channel) as Aum
- 2015 Wifi Society Ep. Keep in Touch รักครั้งใหม่ ไม่ปล่อยหลุดมือ (/One 31) as Kobuw
- 2016 I Was Born In the Reign of Rama IX The Series (/One 31) as Tay
- 2017 Fabulous 30: The Series (/One 31) as Yui
- 2018 Blacklist (/GMM 25) as Ms. Jinmanee
- 2022 My Sassy Princess (/One 31) as Rainbow

=== Sitcom ===
- 2015 ฮา in One ตอน นางซิน (/One 31) as Ketee

=== Theater ===
- 20

=== Film ===
- 2012 Rak/Jap/Jai The Romantic Musical as Wun
- 2025 Dream as The Fairy princess (special appearance)

== Television programs ==
=== MC ===
- 2015 4 Po Dam (2015-2018)
- 2015 YouTube:GamWichayaneeThailand

=== Director ===
- 2017 Stage Fighter (2016–2017)
- 2017 Hakoo Duet
- 2017 Diva Makeover เสียงเปลี่ยนสวย
- 2019 Top One ตัวจริงชิงหนึ่ง

=== Contestant ===
- 2008 The Star Season 4
- 2017 The Mask Singer (Thai season 3)
- 2018 Re-Master Thailand
- 2017 Rong La Neo
- 2020–2021 The Wall Song ร้องข้ามกำแพง
