= Gisela (singer) =

Spanish singer (born 1979)

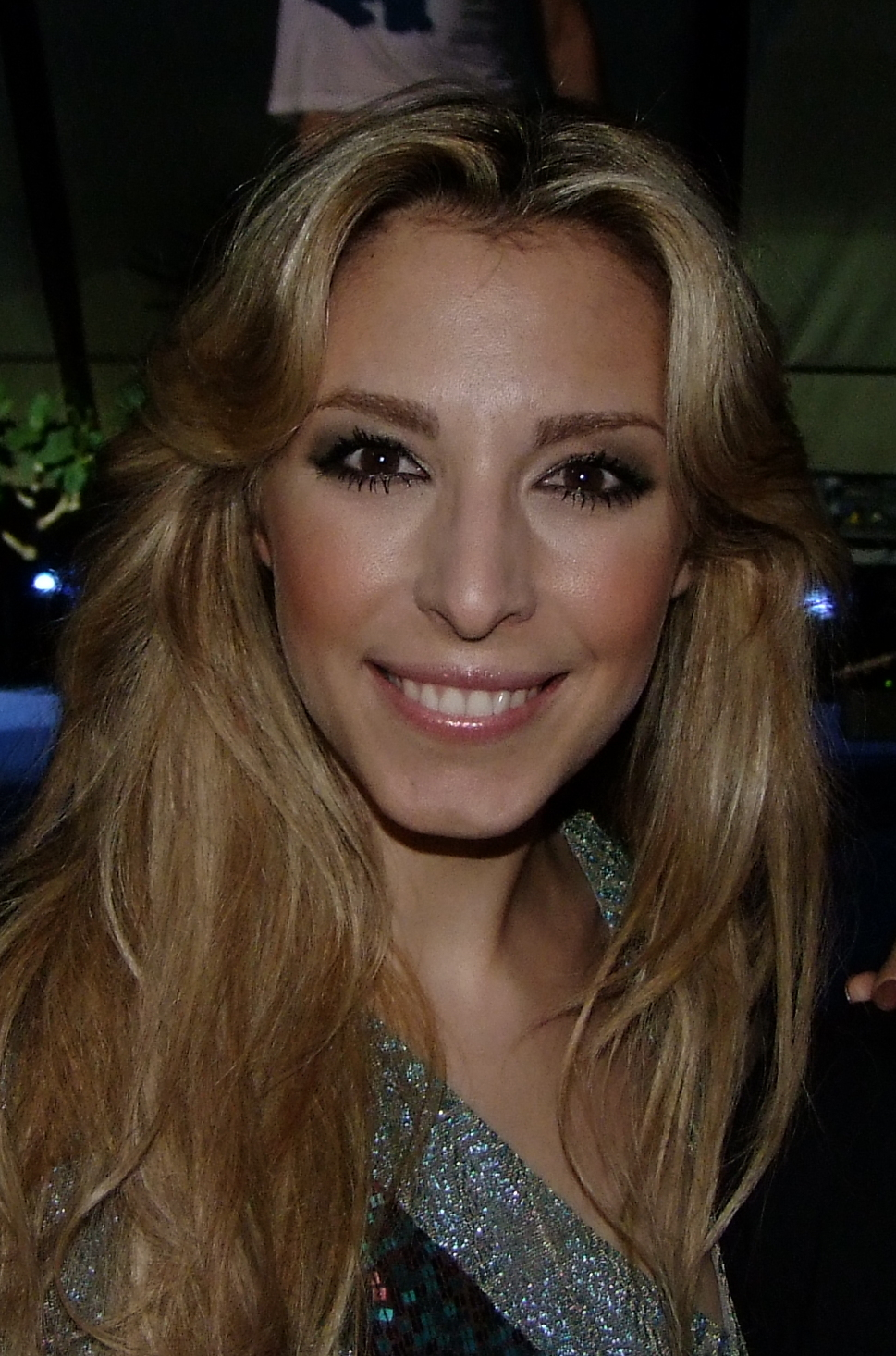
- Gisela in 2008

Background information
- Born: Gisela Lladó Cánovas; 1 January 1979 (age 47); El Bruc (Barcelona), Spain
- Genres: Latin pop
- Instrument: Vocals
- Years active: 2001–present
- Labels: Vale Music (2001–2002); Universal (2002–2005); Filmax (2006–2009); Notton Music (2010–2015); Wonderful Kids (2015)
- Website: vivegisela.com

Gisela Lladó Cánovas (born 1 January 1979), known mononymously as Gisela, is a Spanish singer. She was born in El Bruc (Barcelona), Spain, and studied journalism at the Autonomous University of Barcelona before becoming famous when she placed eighth in the first edition of Operación Triunfo in 2002. She represented Andorra in the Eurovision Song Contest 2008 with the song "Casanova", failing to qualify to the final. She is the singing voice of the Disney character Elsa in European Spanish and Catalan, and thanks to this, she performed at the 92nd Academy Awards along with other international voices of the character.

== Career ==
In 2001–02, Gisela placed eighth in the first edition of Operación Triunfo on Televisión Española (TVE). Her first album, Parte de mí, came out in Spain in 2002, selling 260,000 copies in a few weeks. That year, she was one of the backing singer for Rosa López at the Eurovision Song Contest 2002. In 2003, she won the best performer award in the 44th edition of the Viña del Mar International Song Festival with the song "Este amor es tuyo", written by Chema Purón, which also won the competition.

Her second album in 2003, Más allá has five singles, including "Más allá" (and Catalan version: "Més enllà"), the No.1 "Sola" and "Amor divino". Also in 2003, her version of Irene Cara's "What a Feeling" was included in a commercial in the United Kingdom.

Her father, Salvador Lladó Piquer (1940–2019) died of cancer in Barcelona. Her manager is her older brother, Joan.

=== Ni te lo imaginas ===
Her third album, Ni te lo imaginas, came out in 2006, under a new record label (Filmax, rather than Vale Music). There were four singles off the album, the first and the third becoming Gisela's most successful so far in her career. The first was "Turu-Turu", a pop ballad reaching No.1 in Spain on its second week. Filmax released a Special Edition version of the album, including two new songs, the first called "Mi mundo eres tú" and the second, "Viviré en tus sueños".

=== Eurovision Song Contest 2008 ===
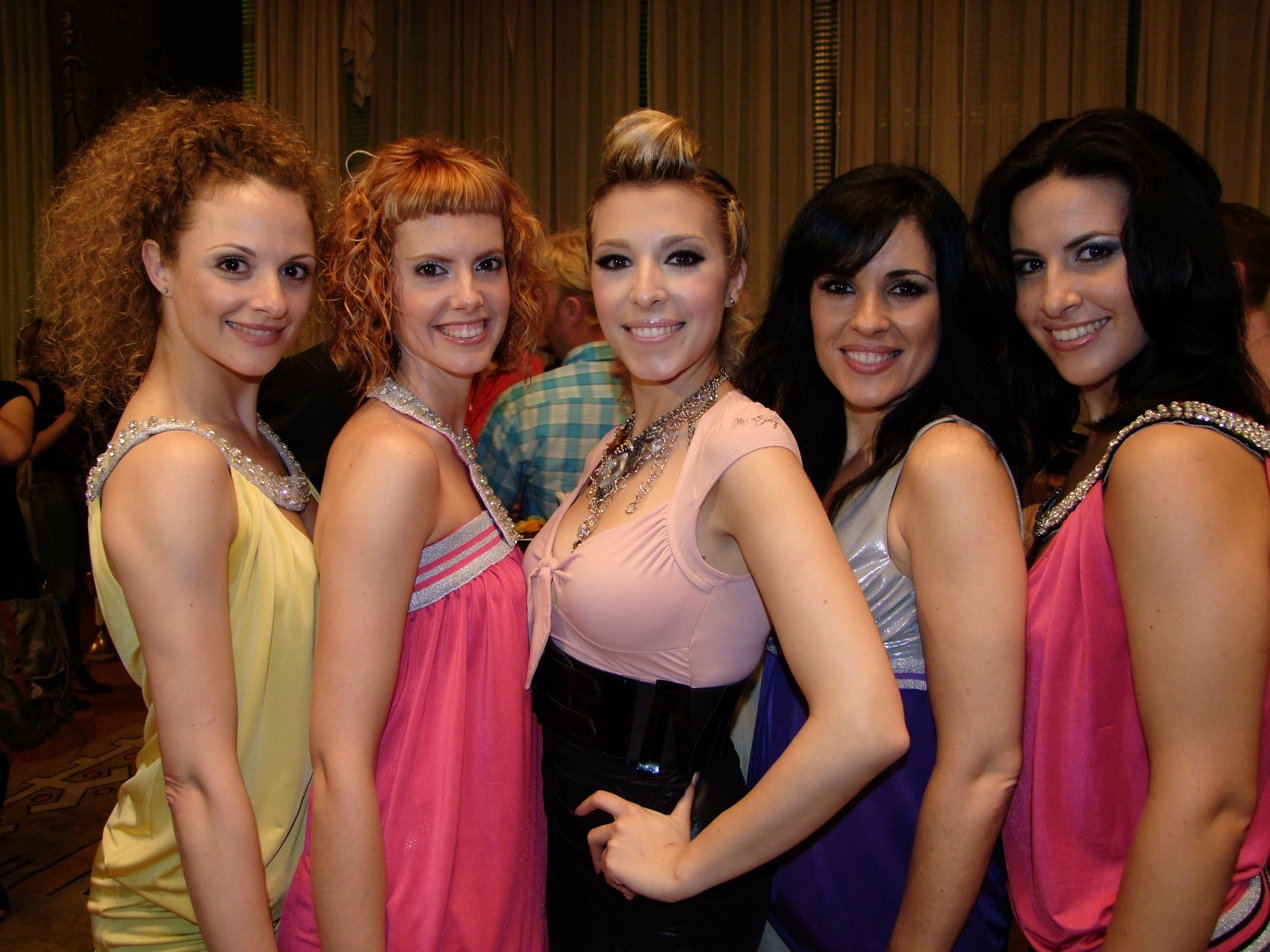
Gisela and her dancers at Eurovision welcome party in Belgrade

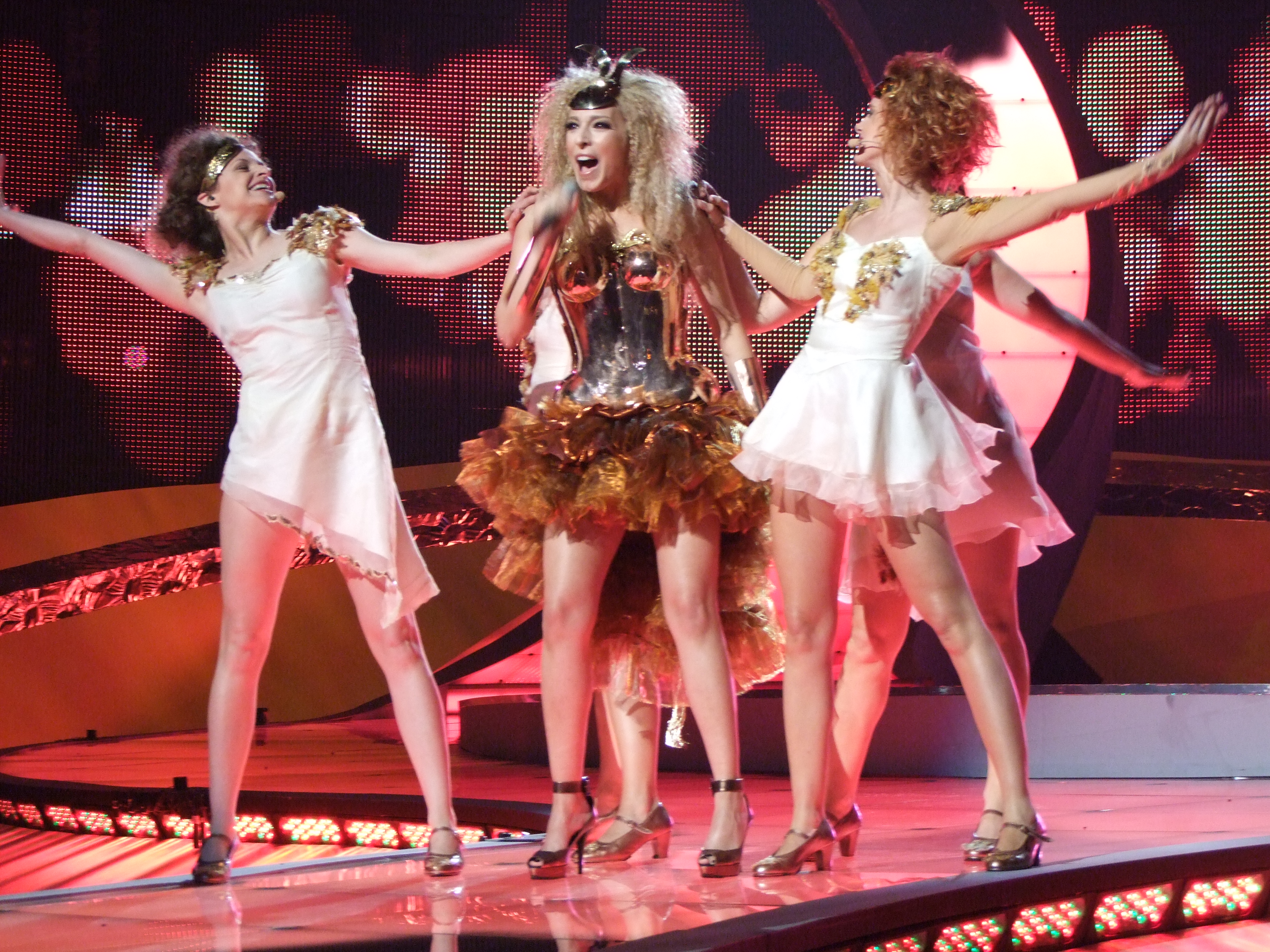
Gisela singing "Casanova" at Eurovision

In 2008, Ràdio i Televisió d'Andorra (RTVA) internally selected Gisela as its representative for the Eurovision Song Contest 2008 with the song "Casanova". She competed in the first semi-final on 20 May 2008. She failed to get through to the final, placing 16th of 19 entries with 22 points. Although this result, she still managed success on the music charts reaching No.2 in Spain.

== Filmography ==
Gisela has performed local voice roles for the Disney movies Peter Pan 2 (2002), Beauty and the Beast (2003), the singing voice of Erika in Barbie as the Princess and the Pauper (2004), the singing voice of Giselle in Enchanted (2007) in both Castilian Spanish and Catalan, the singing voice of Elsa in Frozen (2013) and in Frozen II (2019) also in Castilian Spanish and Catalan. She was also in The Hairy Tooth Fairy (2006) and its sequel (2008), Snowflake, the White Gorilla (2011) and Serie B (2012), in Castilian Spanish.

On 9 February 2020, Gisela was called to join Idina Menzel, Aurora, and eight more of Elsa's international singing voices to perform the song “Into the Unknown” during the 92nd Academy Awards. Every international performer sang one line of the song in a different language: Maria Lucia Heiberg Rosenberg in Danish, Willemijn Verkaik in German, Takako Matsu in Japanese, Carmen Sarahí in Latin American Spanish, Lisa Stokke in Norwegian, Kasia Łaska in Polish, Anna Buturlina in Russian, Gisela in European Spanish, and Gam Wichayanee in Thai.

== Musical Theatre ==
- 2002–2003 – Peter Pan, el musical
- 2004–2006 – El diluvio que viene
- 2007–2008 – Boscos Endins
- 2008–2009 – Aloma
- 2009–2010 – Grease
- 2010–2011 – Los 40 el Musical
- 2011–2013 – Érase una vez el musical / Un mundo mágico / El reino encantado
- 2012–2013 – Esta noche no estoy para nadie
- 2013–present – Gisela y el libro mágico
- 2017 – La Bella Helena
- 2017 – Nit de musicals

== Discography ==
=== Albums ===
Year	Single	Chart	Copies Sold
Year	Single	ESP	Copies Sold
2002	Parte de mí	4	x2 Platinum + 1 Gold
2003	Parte de mí [Special edition]	43	
2003	Más allá	10	x1 Gold
2006	Ni te lo imaginas	32	x1 Gold
2007	Ni te lo imaginas [Special edition]		
2010	Vivir la Navidad		+20.000
2011	Pensando en ti		+10.000

=== Singles ===
Year	Single	Chart		Album
Year	Single	ESP	UK	Album
2002	"Vida"	1	-	Parte de mi
2002	"Mil noches y una más"	4	-	Parte de mi
2002	"Ámame ahora y siempre"	10	-	Parte de mi
2002	"Este amor es tuyo"	18	-	Parte de mi
2003	"Amor divino"	10	-	Más allá / Més enllà
2003	"Más allá" / "Més enllà"	9	-	Más allá / Més enllà
2003	"Sola" / "Sola"	1	-	Más allá / Més enllà
2004	"Tengo fe"	6	-	Más allá / Més enllà
2004	"Nadie como tú"	12	-	Más allá / Més enllà
2006	"Turu Turu"	1	-	Ni te lo imaginas
2006	"Mágica la notte"	62	-	Ni te lo imaginas
2006	"Viviré en tus sueños"	8 (Spanish iTunes Chart)	-	Ni te lo imaginas
2007	"Mi mundo eres tú"	-	79	Ni te lo imaginas
2008	"Casanova"	2	69	Casanova - Single
2010	"Vivir la Navidad"	-	-	Vivir la Navidad
2011	"Él es ella"	-	-	Pensando en ti
2011	"De tarde en tarde"	-	-	Pensando en ti
2013	"Sugarwood"	-	-	
2017	"Sigue el ritmo"	10	-	

Awards and achievements
Preceded by Anonymous with "Salvem el món"	Andorra in the Eurovision Song Contest; 2008	Succeeded by Susanne Georgi with "La teva decisió (Get a Life)"
