= Marco de Goeij =

Dutch composer (born 1967)

- Born: 1967 (age 58–59); Gouda, Netherlands
- Occupation: Composer
- Years active: 1987–present

Marco de Goeij (born 1967 in Gouda) is a Dutch composer, known for having reconstructed the lost musical score for Jon Lord's Concerto for Group and Orchestra in 1999.

De Goeij studied classical guitar at the Utrecht School of the Arts, graduating in 1992. He continued to study in Paris, following lessons in modern classical music from Wim Hoogewerf, a Dutch classical guitarist and microtonalist.

In the mid-1990s, while writing an article about the Concerto for Group and Orchestra as recorded by Deep Purple with the Royal Philharmonic Orchestra, De Goeij learned that the musical score for the concerto had been missing since it was last performed in 1970. He reconstructed the score by listening to CD recordings and watching videos of live performances. When Deep Purple were performing in the Netherlands in 1998, de Goeij presented his work to Jon Lord. After the score had been completed, the reconstructed concerto was played in concert and recorded by Deep Purple with the London Symphony Orchestra in 1999. Since then, it has been played as part of a 2000–2001 world tour, and on several occasions afterwards.

Nowadays Marco de Goeij lives in Bodegraven. He is active as a composer and arranger, having written pieces for carillon, guitar, cello, pipe organ and brass. His original compositions include Dialogue (1989) for saxophone and piano, Canticles, four songs for mourning (1996) and A Rainy Day with Carillons (1997) for carillon, and two works for brass trio titled Intrada (2007) and Jazz Impromptus (2012).
