= Symphony No. 6 (Arnold) =

Symphony by Malcolm Arnold

LPO recording of Malcolm Arnold's Symphony No. 6

The Symphony No. 6, Op. 95 by Malcolm Arnold was written in 1967, and finished in July of that year.

It was premiered by the composer conducting the BBC Northern Symphony Orchestra in Sheffield in June 1968. The symphony had its London premiere on 24 September 1969 at the Royal Albert Hall. The same concert saw the premiere of Jon Lord's Concerto for Group and Orchestra. Both works were performed by the Royal Philharmonic Orchestra conducted by Malcolm Arnold. They were joined for the Concerto by Deep Purple where Jon Lord was a member.

== Music ==
It is scored for three flutes, two oboes, two clarinets, two bassoons, four horns, three trumpets, three trombones, one tuba, timpani, three percussionists (snare drum, bass drum, tenor drum, tambourine, cymbals both crash and suspended, tam-tam, tubular bells), harp and strings.

The three movements are:

1. Energico
2. Lento – Allegretto
3. Con fuoco

== Commercial recordings ==
- 1993 Vernon Handley and the Royal Philharmonic Orchestra on Conifer Records 74321-16847-2 (re-released on Decca 4765337) (first studio recording)
- 1995 Richard Hickox and the London Symphony Orchestra on Chandos Records CHAN 9385
- 2001 Andrew Penny and the RTÉ National Symphony Orchestra on Naxos Records 8.552000 (recorded January 24–25, 2000, in the presence of the composer)
- 2002 Malcolm Arnold and the Royal Philharmonic Orchestra on EMI DVD-A and SACD only (live recording from 1969, paired with the Jon Lord/Deep Purple Concerto) (Recorded by the composer)
- 2006 Vernon Handley and the London Philharmonic Orchestra on the LPO label, LPO-0013 (live recording, Royal Festival Hall, 24 September 2004)
