= Rusty Lance =

Single by Akeboshi

from the album Meet Along the Way
- Released: October 19, 2005 Japan
- Genre: J-pop, Folk
- Length: 4:38
- Label: Sony Music Entertainment Japan; ESCL-2721
- Songwriter: Yoshio Akeboshi
- Producer: Akeboshi

Rusty Lance is a single released by Japanese pop and folk musician Akeboshi. Sony Music Entertainment Japan released the single on October 19, 2005.

== Track listing ==
No.	Title	Length
1.	"Rusty Lance"	4:38
2.	"Sounds"	4:22
3.	"Writing Over the Sign"	3:02

== Personnel ==
- Yoshio Akeboshi (明星嘉男, Akeboshi Yoshio) – guitar, vocals, piano
