= Mamma Mia! Original Cast Recording =

Cast recording by Mamma Mia! musical cast
- Released: November 1, 1999
- Recorded: 1999
- Genre: Pop; cast recording
- Label: Decca (US); Polydor

Mamma Mia! Original Cast Recording is the original cast album for the ABBA-inspired stage musical of the same name. The album was released in 1999 and it reached No.56 in the UK album chart, with 2 weeks on the chart. Re-interest in this 1999 Original London Cast album caused it to reach #12 in the UK Album Chart, having charted at #16 a week earlier. It features performances by the original London cast of the musical including Lisa Stokke, Siobhán McCarthy and Hilton McRae. The album was produced by ABBA members Benny Andersson and Björn Ulvaeus.

The album featured a number of ABBA's best known songs, including the title track, "Dancing Queen", "Gimme! Gimme! Gimme! (A Man After Midnight)" and "Thank You for the Music".

== Track listing ==
=== Original release ===
1. "Overture / Prologue" - Lisa Stokke — 2:56
2. "Honey, Honey" - Lisa Stokke, Eliza Lumley, and Melissa Gibson — 2:02
3. "Money, Money, Money" - Siobhán McCarthy, Louise Plowright, Jenny Galloway, Neal Wright, and Company — 3:01
4. "Thank You for the Music" - Lisa Stokke, Hilton McRae, Paul Clarkson, and Nicholas Colicos — 3:03
5. "Mamma Mia" - Siobhán McCarthy and Company — 3:21
6. "Chiquitita" - Louise Plowright, Jenny Galloway, and Siobhán McCarthy — 2:27
7. "Dancing Queen" - Louise Plowright, Jenny Galloway, and Siobhán McCarthy — 3:44
8. "Lay All Your Love on Me" - Andrew Langtree, Lisa Stokke, and Company — 3:34
9. "Super Trouper" - Siobhán McCarthy, Jenny Galloway, Louise Plowright and Female Company — 3:56
10. "Gimme! Gimme! Gimme! (A Man After Midnight)" - Female Company — 3:34
11. "The Name of the Game" - Lisa Stokke and Nicholas Colicos — 3:22 (2:15 in the Special Edition)
12. "Voulez-Vous" - Company — 3:29
13. "Entr'acte" - Musical cast — 2:17
14. "Under Attack" - Lisa Stokke and Company — 3:11
15. "One of Us" - Siobhán McCarthy — 2:20
16. "SOS" - Siobhán McCarthy and Hilton McRae — 2:44
17. "Does Your Mother Know" - Louise Plowright, Neal Wright and Company — 3:21
18. "Knowing Me, Knowing You" - Hilton McRae — 2:42
19. "Our Last Summer" - Paul Clarkson and Siobhán McCarthy — 2:42
20. "Slipping Through My Fingers" - Siobhán McCarthy and Lisa Stokke — 3:36
21. "The Winner Takes It All" - Siobhán McCarthy — 4:08
22. "Take a Chance on Me" - Jenny Galloway and Nicholas Colicos — 3:33
23. "I Do, I Do, I Do, I Do, I Do" - Hilton McRae, Siobhán McCarthy and Company — 2:29
24. "I Have a Dream" - Lisa Stokke — 2:58

=== 5th anniversary edition ===
The album was re-released in 2004, five years after its initial release to commemorate the musical's 5th anniversary. The new edition contained the original 24 tracks, although "The Name of the Game" had been truncated, as well as three bonus tracks: the encore versions of "Dancing Queen", "Mamma Mia", and "Waterloo".

Another 5th anniversary release, which debuted in 2006, commemorates the Broadway production, which debuted in 2001.

Also included is a deluxe souvenir booklet complete with lyrics and glimpses of Donna Sheridan in international productions, and a bonus DVD that basically gives a behind-the-scenes look at the musical as well as glimpses of international productions of the musical. An additional bonus feature includes clips of the West End cast singing "Money, Money, Money" and "Dancing Queen", as well as fond memories from original Broadway cast members Joe Machota and Tina Maddigan, who play the roles of Sky and Sophie, respectively.

Bonus tracks

- "Mamma Mia" (Encore) - Company
- "Dancing Queen" (Encore) - Siobhán McCarthy, Louise Plowright, Jenny Galloway and Company
- "Waterloo" (Encore) - Siobhán McCarthy, Louise Plowright, Jenny Galloway and Company

== Cast ==
- Lisa Stokke as Sophie Sheridan
- Siobhán McCarthy as Donna Sheridan
- Louise Plowright as Tanya
- Jenny Galloway as Rosie
- Paul Clarkson as Harry
- Hilton McCrae as Sam
- Nicholas Colicos as Bill

== Reception ==
=== Weekly charts ===
Chart (2001–2021)	Peak position
Australian Albums (ARIA)	50
Austrian Albums (Ö3 Austria)	68
Belgian Albums (Ultratop Wallonia)	75
European Top 100 Albums	52
Finnish Albums (Suomen virallinen lista)	23
French Albums (SNEP)	158
German Albums (Offizielle Top 100)	63
New Zealand Albums (RMNZ)	20
Norwegian Albums (VG-lista)	35
Swedish Albums (Sverigetopplistan)	26
US Billboard 200	169
US Billboard Top Pop Catalog Albums	12

=== Year-end charts ===
Year-end chart performance for Mamma Mia! Original Cast Recording
Chart (2000)	Position
Canadian Albums (Nielsen SoundScan)	185

Chart (2001)	Position
Canadian Albums (Nielsen SoundScan)	152

Chart (2002)	Position
Canadian Albums (Nielsen SoundScan)	147

=== Accolades ===
Award Ceremony	Category	Nominee	Result
Grammy Award	Best Musical Theater Album	Benny Andersson, Björn Ulvaeus; Original Cast	Nominated
