= Concerto for Group and Orchestra =

1969 live album by Deep Purple and the Royal Philharmonic Orchestra

Live album by Deep Purple & The Royal Philharmonic Orchestra
- Released: December 1969
- Recorded: 24 September 1969
- Venue: Royal Albert Hall (London)
- Genres: Classical crossover; progressive rock
- Length: 59:26
- Labels: Tetragrammaton (US); Harvest (UK); Polydor (Canada)
- Producer: Deep Purple

Deep Purple chronology
Deep Purple (1969)	Concerto for Group and Orchestra (1969)	Deep Purple in Rock (1970)

Concerto for Group and Orchestra is a live album by Deep Purple and the Royal Philharmonic Orchestra, conducted by Malcolm Arnold. Recorded at London's Royal Albert Hall in September 1969, it consists of a concerto composed by Jon Lord, with lyrics by Ian Gillan.

== Background ==
The first full length album to feature Gillan on vocals and Roger Glover on bass, it was released on vinyl in December 1969. It was also the last Purple album distributed in the US by Tetragrammaton Records, which went defunct shortly after.

The original performance included three additional songs: "Hush", "Wring That Neck", and "Child in Time". These were added to a 2002 reissue.

Long planned by Jon Lord, the project was not very successful in the United States but helped establish Purple's reputation and image in the United Kingdom.

The 1969 performance is considered "groundbreaking" because it was the first time that a major rock band recorded a live album with a full orchestra, cementing the "then odd but today very common" relationship between heavy rock and classical music. (Note: This album by Deep Purple predated works such as Procol Harum Live: In Concert with the Edmonton Symphony Orchestra (1972), Rick Wakeman's Journey to the Centre of the Earth (1974) and Metallica's S&M concert (1999), among other relevant albums)

"I thought it was a total gimmick," observed guitarist Ritchie Blackmore. "I told Jon I'd be prepared to try it, but that I had a lot of heavy rock numbers I wanted to put on an LP, and we'd see which one took off. I didn't want to be involved with the concerto because of the novelty effect, and the press we were getting out of playing it at the Royal Albert Hall. But I said that if the next LP didn't take off, I was prepared to play with orchestras for the rest of my life."

The original score for the concerto was lost in 1970. However, it was performed again in 1999 with a recreated score and has been performed several times since.

== Original 1969 Royal Albert Hall performance ==
The piece was first performed and recorded on 24 September 1969 in the Royal Albert Hall, London, by Deep Purple and The Royal Philharmonic Orchestra, conducted by Malcolm Arnold. The programme consisted of:

No.	Title	Performer(s)	Length
1.	"Symphony No. 6, Op. 95" (Malcolm Arnold) • 1st Movement: Energico (9:19) • 2nd Movement: Lento (8:52) • 3rd Movement: Con Fuoco (7:02)	The Royal Philharmonic Orchestra	25:13
2.	"Hush" (Joe South)	Deep Purple	4:42
3.	"Wring That Neck" (Ritchie Blackmore, Nick Simper, Jon Lord, Ian Paice)	Deep Purple	13:23
4.	"Child in Time" (Blackmore, Ian Gillan, Roger Glover, Lord, Paice)	Deep Purple	12:06
5.	"Concerto for Group and Orchestra" (Jon Lord (with lyrics by Ian Gillan) • First Movement: Moderato – Allegro (19:23) • Second Movement: Andante (19:11) • Third Movement: Vivace – Presto (13:09)	Deep Purple with The Royal Philharmonic Orchestra	51:43
6.	"Parts of the Concerto's "Third Movement" (Given as an encore.)		5:53

This show was the London premiere of Malcolm Arnold's Symphony No. 6.

== Concerto ==
Concerto
- for Group and Orchestra
- by Jon Lord
- Period: Contemporary period
- Form: Concerto
- Composed: 1969
- Duration: About 50–55 minutes
- Movements: Three
- Scoring: Orchestra and group

Premiere
- Date: 24 September 1969 (UK), 25 August 1970 (US).
- Location: Royal Albert Hall, London/Hollywood Bowl, Los Angeles.
- Conductor: Malcolm Arnold/Lawrence Foster.

Concerto for Group and Orchestra is split into three movements.

First movement (Moderato – Allegro)
After an extended orchestral introduction, the group and orchestra work as separate blocks, trying to get dominance over the main theme and working as antagonists to each other. There are cadenzas for electric guitar and clarinet.
Second movement (Andante), with lyrics sung by Ian Gillan
This movement is based around two tunes that are played in various different arrangements by the orchestra and the group, individually and together. After a combined pop / blues version of the second tune, there is an organ cadenza followed by a quiet ending by the orchestra.
Third movement (Vivace – Presto)
Apart from Ian Paice's drum solo, the music combines the orchestra and group together in a "free for all". The movement alternates between 6/8 and 2/4 time signatures.

The Concerto was first performed at the Albert Hall in London on 24 September 1969 with Deep Purple and The Royal Philharmonic Orchestra conducted by Malcolm Arnold. It was performed at second time at the Hollywood Bowl on 25 August 1970, with the Los Angeles Philharmonic Orchestra conducted by Lawrence Foster, after which the score was lost.

== Releases ==
Concerto for Group and Orchestra was released on vinyl in December 1969 in the United States (Tetragrammaton) and in January 1970 in the United Kingdom (Harvest). These releases contained only the "Concerto", with the second movement broken in two-halves. Copies of the original US editions are rare as Tetragrammaton went bankrupt while the album was still being issued. In the following year, the Concerto became the only Tetragrammaton release to be reissued by Warner Bros., Deep Purple's new US label. On 4 April 1970 the Concerto was shown on British television as The Best of Both Worlds. The 1990s saw a CD release including the songs "Wring That Neck" and "Child in Time". In 2002 EMI released special edition DVD-A, SACD and two-CD sets of Concerto for Group and Orchestra, featuring the entire programme of music played that night. In 2003 a video recording of this concert was released on DVD. However, four and a half minutes of the 1st Movement are missing in this video, as it was taken straight from the BBC's 4 April 1970 broadcast of the event (see above). The edit was in the original BBC broadcast.

Concerto for Group and Orchestra

Video by Deep Purple & The Royal Philharmonic Orchestra
- Released: 4 April 1970 (TV), 6 May 2003 (DVD)
- Recorded: 24 September 1969
- Genres: Classical crossover, progressive rock
- Length: 52:30 The Best of Both Worlds
- Label: Eagle Vision

Deep Purple video chronology
Concerto for Group and Orchestra (1970)	Live in Concert 72/73 (2005)

== Track listing ==
=== Original release on vinyl ===
All lyrics are written by Ian Gillan; all music is composed by Jon Lord.

Side 1
No.	Title	Length
1.	"First Movement: Moderato – Allegro"	18:52
2.	"Second Movement: Andante Part 1"	6:35

Side 2
No.	Title	Length
1.	"Second Movement: Andante Conclusion"	12:27
2.	"Third Movement: Vivace – Presto"	15:33

=== 1990 CD ===
No.	Title	Writer(s)	Length
1.	"Wring That Neck"	Ritchie Blackmore, Nick Simper, Jon Lord, Ian Paice	12:51
2.	"Child in Time"	Blackmore, Ian Gillan, Roger Glover, Lord, Paice	12:27
3.	"First Movement: Moderato – Allegro"		19:06
4.	"Second Movement: Andante"		19:01
5.	"Third Movement: Vivace – Presto"		15:24

=== 2002 Remastered CD ===
Disc 1
No.	Title	Writer(s)	Length
1.	"Intro"		3:28
2.	"Hush"	Joe South	4:41
3.	"Wring That Neck"		13:24
4.	"Child in Time"		12:02

Disc 2
No.	Title	Length
1.	"First Movement: Moderato – Allegro"	19:21
2.	"Second Movement: Andante"	19:11
3.	"Third Movement: Vivace – Presto"	13:09
4.	"Encore: Third Movement: Vivace – Presto (Part)"	5:52

=== 2002 SACD and DVDA ===
Disc 1
No.	Title	Writer(s)	Length
1.	"Malcolm Arnold's 6th Symphony Op. 95: First Movement: Energico"	Malcolm Arnold	9:19
2.	"Malcolm Arnold's 6th Symphony Op. 95: Second Movement: Lento"	Arnold	8:51
3.	"Malcolm Arnold's 6th Symphony Op. 95: Third Movement: Con Fuoco"	Arnold	7:02
4.	"Hush"		4:41
5.	"Wring That Neck"		13:24
6.	"Child in Time"		12:02

Disc 2
No.	Title	Length
1.	"First Movement: Moderato – Allegro"	19:21
2.	"Second Movement: Andante"	19:11
3.	"Third Movement: Vivace – Presto"	13:09
4.	"Encore: Third Movement: Vivace – Presto (Part)"	5:52

- DVDA contains everything on a single dual-layered disc and also includes 3 minutes of a video preview.

== 1999 Royal Albert Hall performances ==
On 25 and 26 September 1999, thirty years after its initial performance, the Concerto was again performed in front of a live audience in the Royal Albert Hall. To make this performance possible, a new score was created by Lord with the assistance of Paul Mann and Marco de Goeij by listening to the recording and watching the video of the 1969 performance. Performers were:

- Deep Purple:
  - Jon Lord: organ
  - Steve Morse: guitar
  - Ian Gillan: vocals
  - Roger Glover: bass
  - Ian Paice: drums
- Guest vocalists:
  - Miller Anderson
  - Sam Brown
  - Ronnie James Dio
- The Steve Morse Band
  - Dave LaRue: bass
  - Van Romaine: drums
- The Kick Horns
  - Simon Clarke: alto and baritone saxophones, flute
  - Roddy Lorimer: trumpet and flugelhorn
  - Tim Sanders: tenor and soprano saxophones

- The London Symphony Orchestra, conducted by Paul Mann

The programme consisted of:

1. Four Scottish Dances (Malcolm Arnold), performed by the London Symphony Orchestra
2. "Pictured Within", performed by Jon Lord and Miller Anderson
3. "Wait A While", performed by Jon Lord and Sam Brown
4. "Sitting in a Dream", performed by Roger Glover and Ronnie James Dio
5. "Love Is All", performed by Roger Glover and Ronnie James Dio
6. "Via Miami", performed by Ian Gillan
7. "That's Why God Is Singing the Blues", performed by Ian Gillan
8. "Night Meets Light", performed by The Steve Morse Band
9. "Take It off the Top", performed by The Steve Morse Band
10. "Wring That Neck", performed by Ian Paice & The Kick Horns
11. Concerto for Group and Orchestra (Jon Lord with lyrics by Ian Gillan), performed by Deep Purple and The London Symphony Orchestra
  1. "First Movement: Moderato – Allegro" (19:23)
  2. "Second Movement: Andante" (19:11)
  3. "Third Movement: Vivace – Presto" (13:09)
12. "Ted the Mechanic", performed by Deep Purple and The London Symphony Orchestra
13. "Watching the Sky", performed by Deep Purple and The London Symphony Orchestra
14. "Sometimes I Feel Like Screaming", performed by Deep Purple and The London Symphony Orchestra
15. "Pictures Of Home", performed by Deep Purple and The London Symphony Orchestra
16. "Smoke on the Water", performed by the evening's entire ensemble

A recording of the concert was released on a double CD as Live at the Royal Albert Hall. A cut recording of the performance was also released on DVD, entitled In Concert with the London Symphony Orchestra.

== 2000–2001 tour ==
Encouraged by the success of the 1999 performances, Deep Purple took the Concerto on tour, first performing it in South America with local orchestras, then in Europe with the George Enescu Philharmonic Orchestra, in Japan with the New Japan Philharmonic Orchestra, all conducted by Paul Mann.

== 40th anniversary performance ==
On 24 September 2009 Jon Lord joined the RTÉ Concerto Orchestra in the National Concert Hall, Dublin, Ireland to celebrate the 40th anniversary of the first performance of Concerto for Group and Orchestra. Also performed, were pieces from Jon Lord's solo career and a number of Deep Purple songs including an orchestral version of Child In Time.

== Further performances ==
The score of the concerto having been recreated, groups and orchestras across the world were free to perform it:

Dates	Venue	Performers
January 2003 (3 performances)	Sydney Opera House, Australia for the Sydney Festival	George and The Sydney Symphony Orchestra
March 2003 (2 performances)	Perth, Australia	Jon Lord, George and The West Australian Symphony Orchestra
July 2006	Henley Festival, England	
7 October 2007	Malcolm Arnold Festival, Northampton, England	Jon Lord and The Royal Philharmonic Orchestra
7 October 2007	This festival in memory of the late Malcolm Arnold also included Arnold's Symphony No. 6 and Lord's Masque, a work dedicated to Arnold.	
27–29 March 2008 (3 performances)	Adelaide, Australia	Jon Lord and The Adelaide Symphony Orchestra
11–12 March 2009 (2 performances)	Bratislava, Slovakia	Jon Lord and The Slovak Radio Symphony Orchestra
2 May 2009	São Paulo, Brazil	Jon Lord and Orquestra Sinfônica Municipal de São Paulo
1 September 2009	Plovdiv, Bulgaria	Jon Lord with singers Doogie White and Kasia Łaska, Darin Vasilev (guitar), Ivaylo Zvezdomirov (bass), Venko Poromanski (drums) and Plovdiv Philharmonic Orchestra conducted by Nayden Todorov
5 November 2009	Bucharest, Romania	Jon Lord and Rousse Orchestra
16 May 2010	Newark, Delaware, United States	Brian Stone and the University of Delaware Symphony Orchestra
16 June 2010	Liverpool, United Kingdom	Jon Lord and The Royal Liverpool Philharmonic Orchestra
28 April 2011	Palermo, Italy	Jon Lord and The Vincenzo Bellini Symphony Orchestra
6 June 2011	Mulhouse, France	Jon Lord with singers Steve Balsamo, Kasia Łaska and Patrick Rondat (guitar), Patrice Guers (bass), Steve White (drums) and the Orchestre Symphonique de Mulhouse. Musical direction by Gwennolé Rufet.
21–22 November 2019	Palais Montcalm, Québec, Canada	50th anniversary performance and Canadian premiere featuring Iron Maiden lead singer Bruce Dickinson, The Paul Deslauriers Band and the Orchestre Symphonique de Québec. Musical direction by Paul Mann.
5 November 2021	Audi Aréna, Győr, Hungary	Hungarian premiere featuring Iron Maiden lead singer Bruce Dickinson, Deep Purple bassist Roger Glover, and the Győr Philharmonic Orchestra. Musical Direction by Paul Mann.
15 March–25 April 2023	Bucharest, Sofia, Sarajevo, Ljubljana, Zagreb, São Paulo, Rio De Janeiro and other cities	11-date European and Brazilian tour featuring Iron Maiden lead singer Bruce Dickinson, Orquestra Sinfônica do Estado de São Paulo (OSESP), Kaitner Z Doka (guitar), Bernhard Welz (drums), John O'Hara (Jethro Tull) (keyboards), Tanya O'Callaghan (Whitesnake) (bass) and Mario Argandoña (percussion). Musical Direction by Paul Mann.
5-6 January 2025	Tonhalle, Zurich, Switzerland	Sinfonieorchester TiFiCo with Zlatko Perica (guitar), Christoph Siegenthaler (hammond), Marina Santelli (vocals), Simon Ryf (bass), Philipp Schmid (drums). Musical Direction by Christof Brunner.

== 2012 studio version ==
In October 2012 a studio version of the Concerto for Group and Orchestra was released. The recording features the Royal Liverpool Philharmonic Orchestra conducted by Paul Mann. The soloists are Jon Lord (organ), Darin Vasilev (guitar in the 1st movement), Joe Bonamassa (guitar in the 2nd movement), Steve Morse (guitar in the 3rd movement), Steve Balsamo, Kasia Łaska, and Bruce Dickinson (vocals), Brett Morgan (drums), and Guy Pratt (bass). The orchestral parts were recorded at the Philharmonic Hall, Liverpool on 1 and 2 June 2011. The band parts were recorded in August and October 2011 and also in May 2012. The album was mixed at Abbey Road Studios in late May 2012. According to Paul Mann, Jon Lord heard the final master of the recording a few days before his death on 16 July 2012.

== Reception ==
Professional ratings
Review scores
Source	Rating
Allmusic	3/5 stars
Select	1/5 medals

=== Malcolm Arnold's views ===
In an interview for hospital radio in Huddersfield in 1970, shortly after the Royal Albert Hall performance, Arnold provided a positive take on the experience:

What strikes me about Deep Purple is their tremendous musical integrity. This is so refreshing in a commercial world. I loved working with them. They're thorough musicians. They're not trying to prove anything. They just like to play now and again with a Symphony Orchestra. They're not trying to prove any deep philosophical problem. They just want to write music that's enjoyable.

=== Ritchie Blackmore's views ===
In a 1979 interview with Sounds magazine Blackmore said:

I was not into classical music then. I was very very moody and just wanted to play very very loudly and jump around a lot. I couldn't believe we were playing with orchestras. We kept getting lumbered playing with them. We started off in '68 – this is my opinion – as a relatively competent band with a lot to say but saying it all at the same time as each other. In '69 we went into the classical stuff because it was Jon Lord's big thing to write a concerto for group and orchestra. He was very sincere, but I didn't like playing it or respect the fact that we were doing it. The orchestra was very condescending towards us, and I didn't like playing with them, so it was one big calamity onstage. But Jon was happy with it and management was happy with it because we had a press angle, which I resented very much.

In 1970 I said, 'right, we're going to make a rock and roll LP. If this doesn't succeed I'll play in orchestras for the rest of my life', because Jon wasn't too into hard rock. Luckily it took off, so I didn't have to play with orchestras any more.

I love orchestras, chamber music – unaccompanied violin is my favourite. But I respected them too much, and we just weren't in the same calibre. I'd been playing 15 years at the time, and stuck next to some dedicated violinist who's been playing for 50 years just to give an angle to the press – it's insulting. That's why it started and ended very abruptly.

== Legacy ==
The cover art of the Swedish heavy metal band Opeth's 2010 concert DVD In Live Concert at the Royal Albert Hall is intentionally similar in layout, colour and motive to that of Deep Purple's Concerto for Group and Orchestra, "underlining Opeth's longstanding love for their prog-rock roots".

== Personnel ==
- Jon Lord – organ, orchestral arrangements
- Ritchie Blackmore – guitars
- Ian Gillan – vocals
- Roger Glover – bass
- Ian Paice – drums
- Royal Philharmonic Orchestra – orchestral instruments
- Malcolm Arnold – conductor

== Charts ==
Original album (1969)

Chart (1969–1970)	Peak position
Canada Top Albums/CDs (RPM)	50
German Albums (Offizielle Top 100)	22
UK Albums (Official Charts)	26
US Billboard 200	149

Reunion performance (1999)

Chart (1999–2000)	Peak position
German Albums (Offizielle Top 100)	32
Dutch Albums (Album Top 100)	86
Swiss Albums (Schweizer Hitparade)	65

Jon Lord's studio version (2012)

Chart (2012)	Peak position
German Albums (Offizielle Top 100)	37
