= Into the Unknown (song) =

2019 song by Idina Menzel with the Norwegian singer Aurora

Single by Idina Menzel and Aurora

from the album Frozen II (Original Motion Picture Soundtrack)
- Released: November 4, 2019
- Recorded: 2019
- Genre: Show tune
- Length: 3:20
- Label: Walt Disney
- Songwriters: Kristen Anderson-Lopez; Robert Lopez
- Producers: Tom MacDougall; Dave Metzger; Kristen Anderson-Lopez; Robert Lopez

Idina Menzel singles chronology
"Small World" (2017)	"Into the Unknown" (2019)	"The Loud Mouse Song" (2022)

Aurora singles chronology
"The River" (2019)	"Into the Unknown" (2019)	"Exist for Love" (2020)

Music video (film sequence)
- "Into the Unknown" on YouTube

"Into the Unknown" is a song recorded by American actress and singer-songwriter Idina Menzel and Norwegian singer-songwriter Aurora from the 2019 Disney film Frozen 2, with music and lyrics composed by Kristen Anderson-Lopez and Robert Lopez. The song received Academy Award, Critics' Choice Movie Award, Golden Globe Award and Satellite Award nominations for Best Original Song.

== Production ==
Anderson-Lopez and Lopez, who wrote the songs for the 2013 animated film Frozen, reprised their roles for the sequel Frozen II. They also helped develop the story alongside Chris Buck, Jennifer Lee, and Marc E. Smith. Once a foundation for the story emerged, Anderson-Lopez and Lopez marked out points where songs would be used to move the story forward. The pair needed a song for a major moment for Elsa. Initially, the pair wrote a song called "I Seek the Truth" for the moment. At this point, the concept of Elsa hearing and following a mysterious voice had not been conceived yet. When this plot point was developed, the pair went back to the scene and wrote "Into the Unknown".

Menzel first sang the song in her dressing room backstage at an off-Broadway play, with Anderson-Lopez and Lopez bringing in a keyboard to provide the music.

== Context ==
A sample of the song and its refrain after which the voice can be heard vocalizing, which plays a major role in the movie's story line.

It's an anthem that kids, and adults, can really relate to – that sense of, you're being called to go do something, but you don't know what it is or where it's going to lead you ... It sort of says, "Follow your calling."

— Clark Spencer, president of Disney Animation Studios, Los Angeles Times

The song is Elsa's "flagship number", and prominently features a siren call that serves as the film's musical motif that Christophe Beck weaves throughout the film score. The call is derived from the Latin sequence Dies irae, but is delivered in a manner inspired by the Scandinavian music form kulning.

Within the narrative of the film, the song details Elsa's inner conflict over deciding whether or not to leave Arendelle and track down the source of a mysterious voice she keeps hearing.

== International versions ==
On its theater release, the movie numbered 48 dubbings worldwide, to which an Indonesian and Malay version was added the following year, with the song Into the Unknown counting 47 versions overall: Charlotte Hervieux's recording of the song was used in both French versions released in Europe and Canada, although the rest of the dubbings were independent. Among the dubbings released, a version in Tamil, Telugu and Northern Sami was recorded for the sequel, even though the first movie has never been dubbed into these languages. As it happened in Moana with a Tahitian, Māori, and Hawaiian version, the Sami version was an exceptional dubbing made specifically for the movie, given the inspiration it took from Sami culture.

As was done for Frozen, Dutch musical actress Willemijn Verkaik sang both for the Dutch and German-language version, while Spanish singer Gisela performed both the Catalan and European Spanish version.

On December 13, a multi-language video of the song featuring 29 of the 47 existing versions was published on Disney's Vevo channel. On February 9, 2020, Menzel and Aurora performed the song during the 92nd Academy Awards together with nine of the song's international singers singing in nine different languages: Maria Lucia Heiberg Rosenberg in Danish, Willemijn Verkaik in German, Takako Matsu in Japanese, Gisela in European Spanish, Carmen Sarahí in Latin American Spanish, Lisa Stokke in Norwegian, Kasia Łaska in Polish, Anna Buturlina in Russian and Gam Wichayanee in Thai.

Highlighted versions were released later than 2019

"Into the Unknown" worldwide
Language	Performer	Title	Translation
Arabic	نسمة محجوب (Nesma Mahgoub)	"في طريق مجهول" ("Fi tariq majhul")	"On an unknown path"
Modern Standard Arabic	نسمة محجوب (Nesma Mahgoub)	"داخل المجهول" ("Dakhil almajhuli")	"Inside the unknown"
Bulgarian	Надежда Панайотова (Nadezhda Panayotova)	"Към незнаен свят" ("Kŭm neznaen svyat")	"To an unknown world"
Cantonese	王嘉儀 (Sophy Wong)	"Into the unknown"	
Catalan	Gisela	"Un lloc secret"	"A secret place"
Croatian	Nataša Mirković	"U tajnovit svijet"	"To a mysterious world"
Czech	Monika Absolonová	"Do neznáma dál"	"To the unknown beyond"
Danish	Maria Lucia Heiberg Rosenberg	"Ud i ukendt land"	"Out on terra incognita"
Dutch	Willemijn Verkaik	"Een onbekend oord"	"An unknown place"
English	Idina Menzel	"Into the unknown"	
Estonian	Hanna-Liina Võsa	"Tundmatuse teel"	"On the road to the unknown"
Finnish	Katja Sirkiä	"Tuntemattomaan"	"Into the unknown"
Flemish	Elke Buyle	"Als ik je nu volg"	"If I follow you now"
French	Charlotte Hervieux	"Dans un autre monde"	"Into another world"
German	Willemijn Verkaik	"Wo noch niemand war"	"Where no one’s ever been"
Greek	Σία Κοσκινά (Sía Koskiná)	"Στ' άγνωστο να 'ρθω" ("St' áynosto na 'rtho")	"To come into the unknown"
Hebrew	מונה מור (Mona Mor)	"אל עבר הסוד" ("El ever hasod")	"Towards the secret"
Hindi	सुनिधि चौहान (Sunidhi Chauhan)	"अनजान जहाँ" ("Anjaan jahaan")	"Unknown world"
Hungarian	Nikolett Füredi	"Messze hívó szó"	"Far beckoning word"
Icelandic	Ágústa Eva Erlendsdóttir	"Inn á nýja braut"	"On a new path"
Indonesian	Mikha Sherly Marpaung	"Ke tempat yang tak dikenal"	"To an unknown place"
Italian	Serena Autieri	"Nell'ignoto"	"Into the unknown"
Japanese	松たか子 (Takako Matsu)	"イントゥ・ジ・アンノウン ～ 心のままに" ("Intū ji announ ~ Kokoro no mama ni")	"Into the unknown ~ As my heart desires"
Kazakh	Гүлсім Мырзабекова (Gúlsim Myrzabekova)	"Белгісіздікке" ("Belgisizdikke")	"Into the unknown"
Korean	박혜나 (Park Hye-na)	"숨겨진 세상" ("Sumgyeojin sesang")	"A hidden world"
Latvian	Jolanta Strikaite	"Nezināmajā"	"Into the unknown"
Lithuanian	Girmantė Vaitkutė	"Ten kur nežinia"	"Where there is uncertainty"
Malay	Mafarikha Akhir	"Ke alam baru"	"To a new world"
Mandarin Chinese (China)	胡维纳 ("Hú Wéi-Nà"; Jalane Hu)	"寻找真相" ("Xún zhǎo zhēn xiāng")	"Looking for the truth"
Mandarin Chinese (Taiwan)	蔡永淳 (Tsai Yung-Chun)	"向未知探索" ("Xiàng wèizhī tànsuǒ")	"Exploring the unknown"
Norwegian	Lisa Stokke	"I ukjent land"	"Into Unknown Lands"
Polish	Kasia Łaska	"Chcę uwierzyć snom"	"I want to believe in dreams"
Portuguese (Brazil)	Taryn Szpilman	"Minha intuição"	"My intuition"
Portuguese (Europe)	Ana Margarida Encarnação	"Muito mais além"	"So farther away"
Romanian	Dalma Kovács	"În necunoscut"	"Into the unknown"
Russian	Анна Бутурлина (Anna Buturlina)	"Вновь за горизонт" ("Vnov za gorizont")	"Beyond the horizon again"
Sámi	Marianne Pentha	"Amas mu vuordá"	"The unknown is waiting for me"
Serbian	Јелена Гавриловић (Jelena Gavrilović)	"Мени незнано" ("Meni neznano")	"Unknown to me"
Slovak	Andrea Somorovská	"Do neznáma ísť"	"Go into the unknown"
Slovene	Nuška Drašček Rojko	"Nekam daleč stran"	"Somewhere far away"
Spanish (Europe)	Gisela	"Mucho más allá"	"So farther away"
Spanish (Latin America)	Carmen Sarahí	"Mucho más allá"	"So farther away"
Swedish	Annika Herlitz	"In i en ny värld"	"Into a new world"
Tamil	சுருதி ஹாசன் (Shruti Haasan)	"இழுக்கும் மாயோள்" ("Izhukkum maayoll")	"Enchanting Squall"
Telugu	రమ్య బెహరా (Ramya Behara)	"నీ మాయవల్లో" ("Nee maaya val lo")	"Your magic trap"
Thai	วิชญาณี เปียกลิ่น (Wichayanee Pearklin)	"ดินแดนที่ไม่รู้" ("Dindaen Thi Mai Ru")	"The unknown land"
Turkish	Begüm Günceler	"Meçhule doğru"	"Into the unknown"
Ukrainian	Шаніс (Shanis)	"У незнане знов" ("U neznane znov")	"Again into the unknown"
Vietnamese	Tiêu Châu Như Quỳnh	"Nơi hư vô lạc lối"	"The lost world filled with nothingness"

== Reception ==
=== Critical reception ===
The song was presented to the public as the "Let It Go" of Frozen II. Slate argues that the song was "engineered to deliver the same euphoria of internal struggle followed by cathartic release." The Daily Telegraph suggested that it had the same catchy qualities as its predecessor but that time would tell if younger fans of the film would accept it as a hit.

=== Accolades ===
Award	Category	Result
Academy Awards	Best Original Song	Nominated
Critics' Choice Awards	Best Song	Nominated
Georgia Film Critics Association	Best Original Song	Nominated
Golden Globe Awards	Best Original Song	Nominated
Grammy Awards	Best Song Written for Visual Media	Nominated
Hollywood Critics Association	Best Original Song	Nominated
Houston Film Critics Society	Best Original Song	Nominated
Hollywood Music in Media Awards	Best Original Song	Nominated
Satellite Awards	Best Original Song	Nominated

== Personnel ==
Credits adapted from Tidal.

- Earl Ghaffari – editing
- David Boucher – mixing, recording engineer
- Andrew Page – music production
- Tom Hardisty – recording
- Kevin Harp – recording engineer
- Dave Metzger – recording arranger
- Joey Raia – recording engineer
- Gabe Guy – assistant recording engineer
- Nathan Eaton – assistant recording engineer
- Zach Hancock – assistant recording engineer
- Paul McGrath – assistant recording engineer
- Jack Mills – assistant recording engineer
- Juan Peña – assistant recording engineer
- John Prestage – assistant recording engineer
- Adam Schoeller – assistant recording engineer
- Morgan Stratton – assistant recording engineer

== Charts ==
Chart (2019–2020)	Peak position
Australia Digital Tracks (ARIA)	32
Belgium (Ultratip Bubbling Under Flanders)	15
Canada Hot 100 (Billboard)	39
Ireland (IRMA)	31
Japan Hot 100 (Billboard)	41
Malaysia (RIM)	7
New Zealand Hot Singles (RMNZ)	4
Scottish Singles Sales (Official Charts)	12
Singapore (RIAS)	5
South Korea (Gaon)	2
UK Singles (Official Charts)	19
US Billboard Hot 100	46
US Kid Digital Songs Sales (Billboard)	1
US Rolling Stone Top 100	22

== Certifications ==
Region	Certification	Certified units/sales
Australia (ARIA)	2× Platinum	140,000^{‡}
Brazil (Pro-Música Brasil)	Platinum	40,000^{‡}
Canada (Music Canada)	3× Platinum	240,000^{‡}
New Zealand (RMNZ)	Platinum	30,000^{‡}
United Kingdom (BPI)	Platinum	600,000^{‡}
United States (RIAA)	4× Platinum	4,000,000^{‡}
^{‡} Sales+streaming figures based on certification alone.

== Panic! at the Disco version ==
"Into the Unknown"

Promotional single by Panic! at the Disco

from the album Frozen II
- Published: Wonderland Music Company
- Released: November 4, 2019
- Recorded: 2019
- Genre: Pop rock; show tune; operatic pop
- Length: 3:07
- Label: Walt Disney
- Songwriters: Kristen Anderson-Lopez; Robert Lopez
- Producer: Jake Sinclair

Music video
- "Into the Unknown" on YouTube

Most dubbings played the English version, performed by American solo project Panic! at the Disco, over the end credits. However, the song numbers 12 more versions in other languages. The Japanese and Korean versions opted for two female vocalists, while the version used for the Mandarin version made for China was sung by an ensemble. The Hindi, Tamil and Telugu versions were all performed by Indian singer Nakul Abhyankar, who also dubbed Kristoff in Tamil and Telugu, and sang Weezer's version of "Lost in the Woods" into all three languages.

"Into the Unknown" (end credits version) worldwide
Language	Performer	Title	Translation
English	Panic! at the Disco	"Into the unknown"	
German	Mark Forster	"Wo noch niemand war"	"Where no one’s ever been"
Hindi	नकुल अभ्यङ्कर (Nakul Abhyankar)	"अनजान जहाँ" ("Anjaan jahaan")	"Unknown world"
Italian	Giuliano Sangiorgi	"Nell'ignoto"	"Into the unknown"
Japanese	中元みずき (Mizuki Nakamoto)	"イントゥ・ジ・アンノウン ～ 心のままに" ("Intū ji announ ~ Kokoro no mama ni")	"Into the unknown ~ As my heart desires"
Kazakh	Дәурен Оразбеков (Dauren Orazbekov)	"Белгісіздікке" ("Belgisizdikke")	"Into the unknown"
Korean	태연 (Taeyeon)	"숨겨진 세상" ("Sumgyeojin sesang")	"A hidden world"
Mandarin Chinese (China)	Super Vocal	"未知的真相" ("Wèizhī de zhēnxiàng")	"The unknown truth"
Portuguese (Europe)	Fernando Daniel	"Muito mais além"	"So farther away"
Russian	Роман Архипов (Roman Arkhipov)	"Вновь за горизонт" ("Vnov za gorizont")	"Beyond the horizon again"
Spanish	David Bisbal	"Mucho más allá"	"So farther away"
Tamil	नकुल अभ्यङ्कर (Nakul Abhyankar)	"இழுக்கும் மாயோள்" ("Izhukkum maayol")	"Deceiving enchantress"
Telugu	नकुल अभ्यङ्कर (Nakul Abhyankar)	"నీ మాయవల్లో" ("Nee maaya val lo")	"Your magic trap"

=== Personnel ===
Credits adapted from Tidal.

- Claudis Mittendorfer – mixing
- Rachel White – recording arranger
- Suzy Shinn – recording engineer
- Steve Genewick – assistant recording engineer

=== Charts ===
Chart (2019–2020)	Peak position
Australia Digital Tracks (ARIA)	36
Canada (Hot Canadian Digital Songs)	33
Ireland (IRMA)	88
Israel (Media Forest)	21
Japan Hot 100 (Billboard)	47
New Zealand Hot Singles (RMNZ)	8
Scottish Singles Sales (Official Charts)	32
Singapore (RIAS)	25
South Korea (Gaon)	118
UK Singles (Official Charts)	74
US Billboard Hot 100	98
US Kid Digital Songs Sales (Billboard)	1
US Pop Digital Songs (Billboard)	13
US Rolling Stone Top 100	87

=== Certifications ===
Region	Certification	Certified units/sales
Brazil (Pro-Música Brasil)	Platinum	40,000^{‡}
New Zealand (RMNZ)	Gold	15,000^{‡}
United Kingdom (BPI)	Silver	200,000^{‡}
United States (RIAA)	Platinum	1,000,000^{‡}
^{‡} Sales+streaming figures based on certification alone.
