= Yellow Moon (EP) =

EP by Akeboshi
- Released: Japan April 19, 2006 US 2006
- Genre: J-pop, Folk
- Length: 24:35
- Label: Sony Music Entertainment Japan

Akeboshi chronology
Rusty Lance (2005)	Yellow Moon (2006)	Colorful Drops (2007)

Yellow Moon is the fourth EP and sixth album released by Japanese pop and folk artist Akeboshi. Sony Music Entertainment Japan released the EP on April 19, 2006; Sony later released it in America under the Epic Records label. The album's title track "Yellow Moon" garnered fame as the thirteenth ending to Naruto.

== Track listing ==
No.	Title	Length
1.	"Yellow Moon (edit)"	3:44
2.	"Peruna"	3:58
3.	"One step behind the door"	3:33
4.	""Hanabi" (花火, Fireworks)"	4:07
5.	"Yellow Moon"	5:12
6.	"Deep End"	4:01

== Personnel ==
- Yoshio Akeboshi (明星嘉男, Akeboshi Yoshio) - Guitar, Vocals, Piano
- Inoue Yousui - Lyrics

== Release history ==
Region	Date	Label	Format	Catalog
Japan	April 19, 2006	Sony Music Entertainment Japan	CD	ESCL-2811
United States	2006	Epic Records	CD	ESCL-2811
