= Akeboshi =

Japanese folk singer (born 1978)

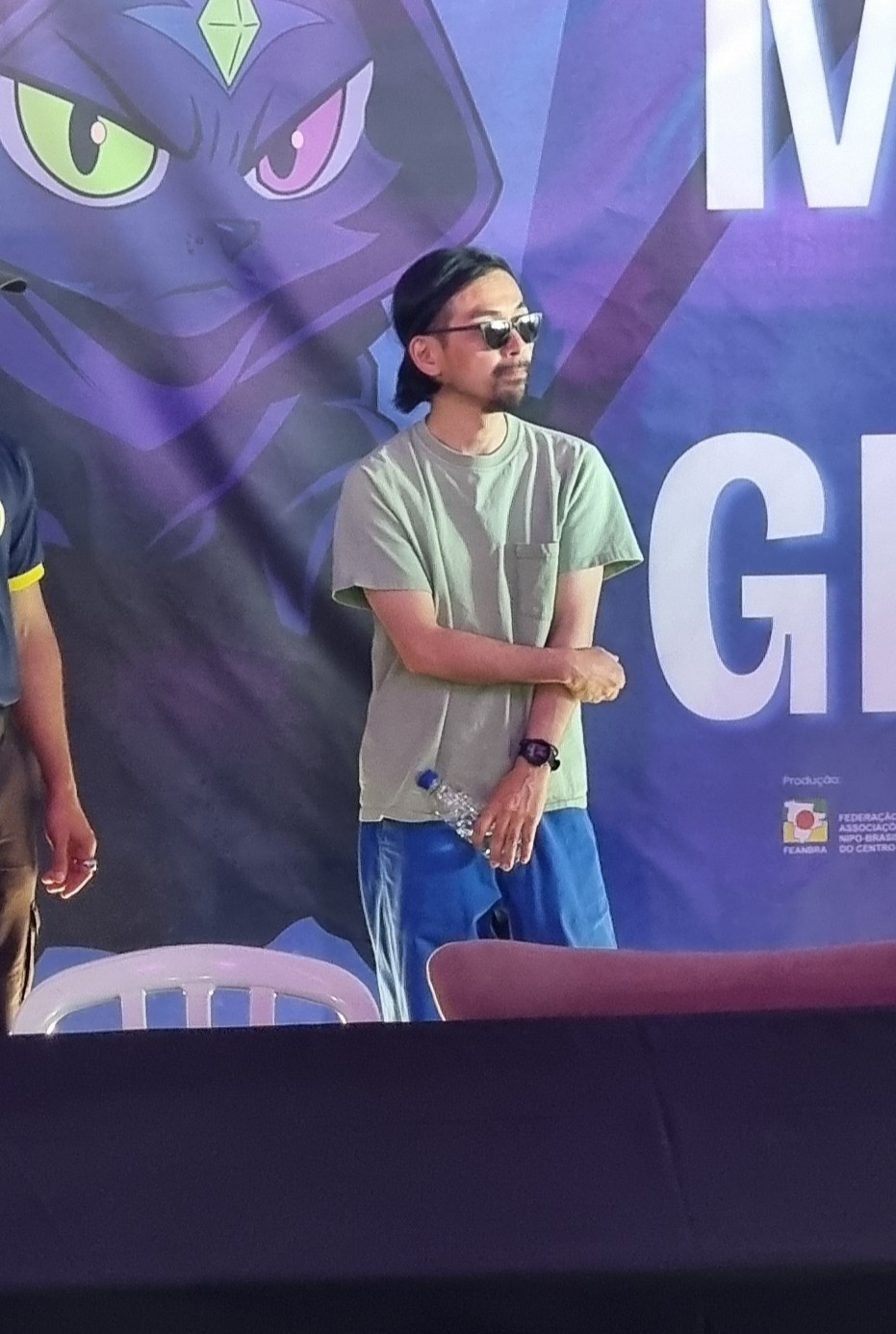

Background information
- Born: July 1, 1978 (age 48); Yokohama, Japan
- Genres: Folk; world
- Occupations: Singer, songwriter, musician
- Years active: 2001–present
- Label: Epic Records Japan
- Website: akeboshi.com

Yoshio Akeboshi (明星嘉男, Akeboshi Yoshio), mononymously known as Akeboshi (アケボシ), is a Japanese folk singer. He is mainly known for the song "Wind", used as an ending theme for the first season of the anime Naruto.

Akeboshi was born on July 1, 1978, in Yokohama. He learned to play the piano when he was three years old, later learning to play the guitar. He studied music in Liverpool, and his time there has heavily influenced his music. Before his major debut, he produced two of the songs on Matsu Takako's fourth album, A piece of life.

== Akeboshi ==
Akeboshi's debut album, Akeboshi, was released on June 22, 2005, on Epic Records Japan.

1. "Wind"
2. "Night and day"
3. "Hey there"
4. "No wish"
5. "Akikaze no uta" (秋風のうた, Song of the Autumn Wind)
6. "Haikyo no Sofa" (廃墟のソファ, Sofa in a Ruin)
7. "A nine days' wonder"
8. "White reply"
9. "Faerie punks"
10. "Morning high"
11. "Tall boy"
12. "The audience"
13. "Kamisama no shitauchi" (神様の舌打ち, God Clicks His Tongue)
14. "Toki no fune" (時の舟, Ship of Time) (Bonus Track)

Most of these tracks are taken from the mini-albums, with some re-recorded in slightly different arrangements.

== Meet Along the Way ==
Akeboshi's second album, "Meet Along the Way", was released on November 7, 2007, on the Epic Records label in Japan. The simultaneously released limited edition contains a CD with the songs "Rusty Lance," "Yellow Moon," and "Along The Line."

1. "Sky in the Pond"
2. "The Cliff"
3. "Yellow Bird"
4. "Broken bridge"
5. "Seeds"
6. "shadow of the wind"
7. "Green eyes"
8. "Village Stone"
9. "Mercury is rising"
10. "Diamond Dust"
11. "coille gan crann"
12. "Close my door"
13. "Fukurou" (フクロウ, Owl)

== Roundabout ==
Akeboshi's third album, "Roundabout", was released on June 11, 2008, on the Epic Records label in Japan. Called a "complete selection album," it contains no new songs, but does feature previously unreleased live versions of several of his best hits. The simultaneously released limited edition contains a DVD with a collection of his music videos, as well as a documentary of the time he spent in England recording "Meet Along the Way."

1. "Leaf on Leaf"
2. "Sky in the pond"
3. "One step behind the door"
4. "Along the Line"
5. "Peruna"
6. "Yellow Moon"
7. "Rusty lance"
8. "Sounds"
9. "Hey There" (Live)
10. "Seeds" (Live)
11. "Wind" (Live)
12. "A Nine Days' Wonder" (Live)

== After The Rain Clouds Go ==
This full album was released in August 2014, containing 11 songs. Prior to this, the mini album "Start Forming The Words" was released, containing some singles that were included in the full album such as Messed Up Mind, Standing On The Line, and Kumori Yozora.

1. Usual Life
2. Beat The Snow
3. Tiny Rainbow
4. Drifting Sounds
5. Fragments Of Memory
6. Meltwater
7. Kumori Yozora (曇り夜空)
8. Break The Spell
9. Muchuu De Yume No Naka (夢中で夢の中)
10. Standing On The Line
11. Messed Up Mind

== Mini-albums ==
So far, Akeboshi has released six mini-albums and one single, Rusty lance.

=== Stoned town ===
Stoned town was released August 8, 2002. The track "Wind" was used for the first Naruto ending theme.

1. "Wind"
2. "Akikaze no Uta" (Song of the Autumn Wind)
3. "No wish"
4. "Haikyo no Sofa" (Sofa in a Ruin)

=== White reply ===
White reply was released June 18, 2003. A limited-edition version was released on May 13, 2003. It contained an extra song, called "Not real".

1. "Tall boy"
2. "Morning high"
3. "White reply"
4. "Money"

=== Faerie punks ===
Faerie punks was released March 10, 2004.

1. "Hey there"
2. "Night and day"
3. "Kamisama no shitauchi" (神様の舌打ち, God Clicks His Tongue)
4. "Faerie punks"

=== Rusty lance ===
Rusty lance was released October 19, 2005. It contains 3 songs.

1. "Rusty lance"
2. "Sounds"
3. "Writing over the sign"

=== Yellow Moon ===
Yellow Moon was released April 19, 2006 with 6 songs. The title track was used for the thirteenth Naruto ending theme.

1. "Yellow Moon (edit)"
2. "Peruna"
3. "One step behind the door"
4. "Hanabi" (花火, Fireworks)
5. "Yellow Moon"
6. "Deep end"

=== Colorful Drops ===
"Colorful Drops" was released on August 22, 2007. "Along the Line" is the theme for the movie White Mexico.

1. "Along the Line"
2. "leaf on leaf"
3. "Fukurou" (フクロウ, Owl)
4. "Quiet Garden"

=== Start forming the words ===
"Start forming the words" was released on June 15, 2012.

1. "Messed up mind"
2. "Standing on the line"
3. "Kumori yozora" (曇り夜空, Cloudy Night Sky) (Studio Live ver.)
4. "Mienai kabe" (見えない壁, Invisible wall) (Studio Live ver.)

=== Koibitotachi ===
Koibitotachi (恋人たち) was released on November 3, 2015. It consists of 4 songs (a version of Akeboshi's previous song "usual life" and three original songs).

1. Usual life (Special Ver)
2. Chicken
3. Atsushi on a boat
4. Preparations for a journey

=== a little boy ===
"a little boy" was released on June 27, 2019. It contains 5 songs.

1. Buckwheat field
2. a little boy
3. Beagle Bon Voyage
4. VET in the dream box
5. I used to..

== Work with Matsu Takako ==
Matsu Takako's single, Toki no Fune, released September 2004, contains two songs composed by Akeboshi. The title track is another version of "A nine days' wonder", though the lyrics are different and there are some small changes to the melody. The song was used in the drama RUNAWAY, which is a remake of the movie The Fugitive. The single also contains a cover of "White reply".
