= Willemijn Verkaik =

Dutch singer and actress

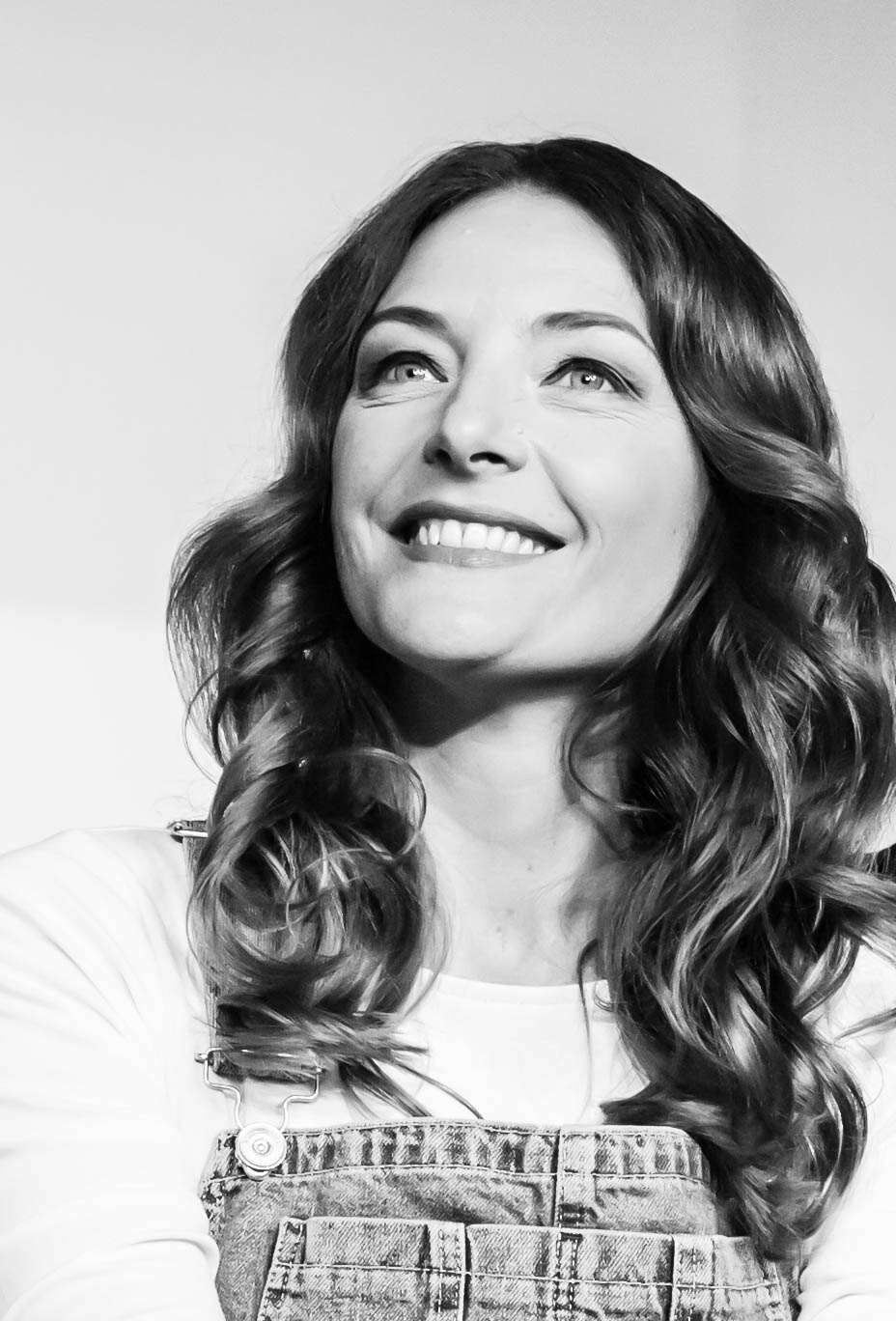
- Verkaik in 2017

Background information
- Born: 16 June 1975 (age 51); Son en Breugel, Netherlands
- Genre: Musical theatre
- Occupations: Singer, actress
- Website: www.willemijnverkaik.nl

Willemijn Verkaik (Dutch pronunciation: [ˈʋɪləmɛiɱ vərˈkɑik]; born 16 June 1975) is a Dutch singer and actress. She is best known for her stage roles in the musicals Wicked and Elisabeth, and for providing the voice of Elsa in the German version (singing only) and the Dutch version of Disney's Frozen. Verkaik is the only person to have played the role of Elphaba in the musical Wicked in three languages and more than 2,000 times – more than any other actress. Her first performance as Elphaba was in 2007, in Stuttgart, Germany, and her last performance was in 2017 in the West End in London.

Verkaik began her career singing in bands for over ten years. She moved to musical theatre, appearing in ensembles and smaller roles from 2001, and finally starring in the title role of Elisabeth (2006). This was followed by Elphaba in Wicked in several productions from 2007 to 2017, including on Broadway and in the West End. Other starring roles have included Donna in Mamma Mia! (2013), Paulina and later Pepa in Women on the Verge of a Nervous Breakdown (2014–2015 and 2019), Kala in Tarzan (2015), Molly in Ghost – Das Musical (2017–2018), Sloane in Bat Out of Hell (2018–2019), Miss Hannigan in Annie (2019–2020), Mrs. Danvers in Rebecca (2022–2023), Elsa in Frozen (2023) and Anne Hathaway in & Juliet (2024). Most of her work has been in the Netherlands and Germany, with roles in Switzerland, the US, the UK and Austria.

== Early life ==
Verkaik was born in Son en Breugel, Netherlands, on 16 June 1975, and grew up in Nuenen near Eindhoven. She graduated from the Rotterdam Conservatory.

== Career ==
Verkaik began her career singing in various pop bands for over ten years. Her first professional theatre credit was in the ensemble of the Dutch production of Elisabeth (2001). In 2004, Verkaik recorded the singing voice of Erica for the Dutch version of the animated movie Barbie as the Princess and the Pauper. In 2008, she was the Dutch voice of Lydia in Barbie & the Diamond Castle.

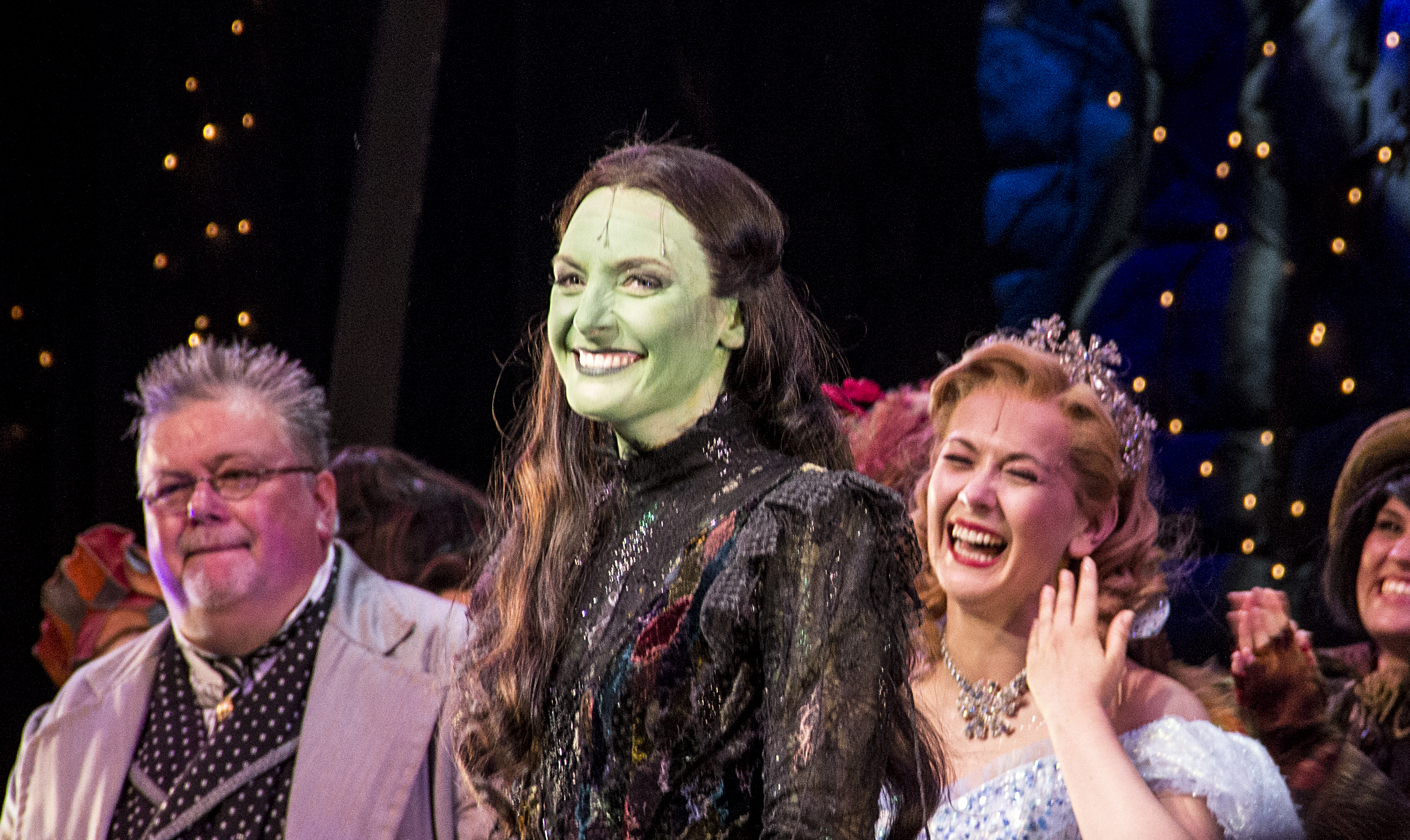
Verkaik as Elphaba in the West End production of Wicked in 2014

Her other musical theatre credits have included Elisabeth (in Holland (2001) and Thun, Switzerland (2006)), The Three Musketeers (2003), We Will Rock You (2004–2005) and Elphaba in Wicked several times; Verkaik was the only actress to have played Elphaba in three languages, She originated the role in the first German-language production, Wicked: Die Hexen Von Oz, in Stuttgart from 1 November 2007 and played the role more than 2,000 times, more than any other actress, until 29 January 2010. She played it in the Dutch-language production in Scheveningen from 6 November 2011 until 11 January 2013, and transferred to the Broadway production from 12 February 2013 to 26 May 2013.

Verkaik played the role of Donna in the Stuttgart production of Mamma Mia! from 26 July 2013 for a three-month run, before reprising the role of Elphaba in the West End Wicked from 18 November 2013. She left the production on 19 July 2014 for health reasons. She played Pauline in musical Women on the Verge of a Nervous Breakdown in the West End from 16 December 2014 until 23 May 2015. This was her first role after a surgery in 2014. She returned to Stuttgart as Kala in Tarzan from August 2015 to May 2016.

Verkaik returned to the role of Elphaba in the West End production of Wicked from 30 January to 22 July 2017. She next starred in Ghost – Das Musical in Berlin from 7 December 2017 to 7 October 2018, as Molly. She appeared as Sloane at the Metronom Theater in Bat Out of Hell from 8 November 2018 to 30 March 2019. She played Pepa in the Amsterdam production of Women on the Verge of a Nervous Breakdown from 4 July 2019 to 14 July 2019 and toured the Netherlands as Miss Hannigan in Annie from 26 November 2019 to 24 May 2020.

On 9 February 2020, Verkaik joined Idina Menzel, Aurora and eight more of Elsa's international dubbers to perform the song "Into the Unknown" during the 92nd Academy Awards. Every international performer sang one line of the song in a different language. From 2022 to 2023, she played Mrs. Danvers in Rebecca in Vienna, Austria. In 2023, she took over the role of Elsa in the German production of Frozen. She left the show to star as Anne Hathaway in & Juliet, also in Hamburg, but then returned to Frozen, and her last performance as Elsa was on 29 September 2024.

On 28 April 2026, it was announced that Verkaik would return to the Netherlands in a touring production of Next to Normal. The production premiered on 10 October 2026 and is set to close on 29 December 2026.

=== Recordings ===
Verkaik appears on Wicked's German-language cast recording and the Scott Alan albums What I Wanna Be When I Grow Up and Live, recorded at the Birdland jazz club in New York City on 30 April 2012. The CD was released on 26 June 2012. Verkaik provided the Dutch speaking and singing voice and the German singing voice of Elsa in dubs of Disney's 2013 animated movie Frozen.

== Personal life ==
She is married to musician Bart van Hoof, a saxophone player.

== Theatre ==
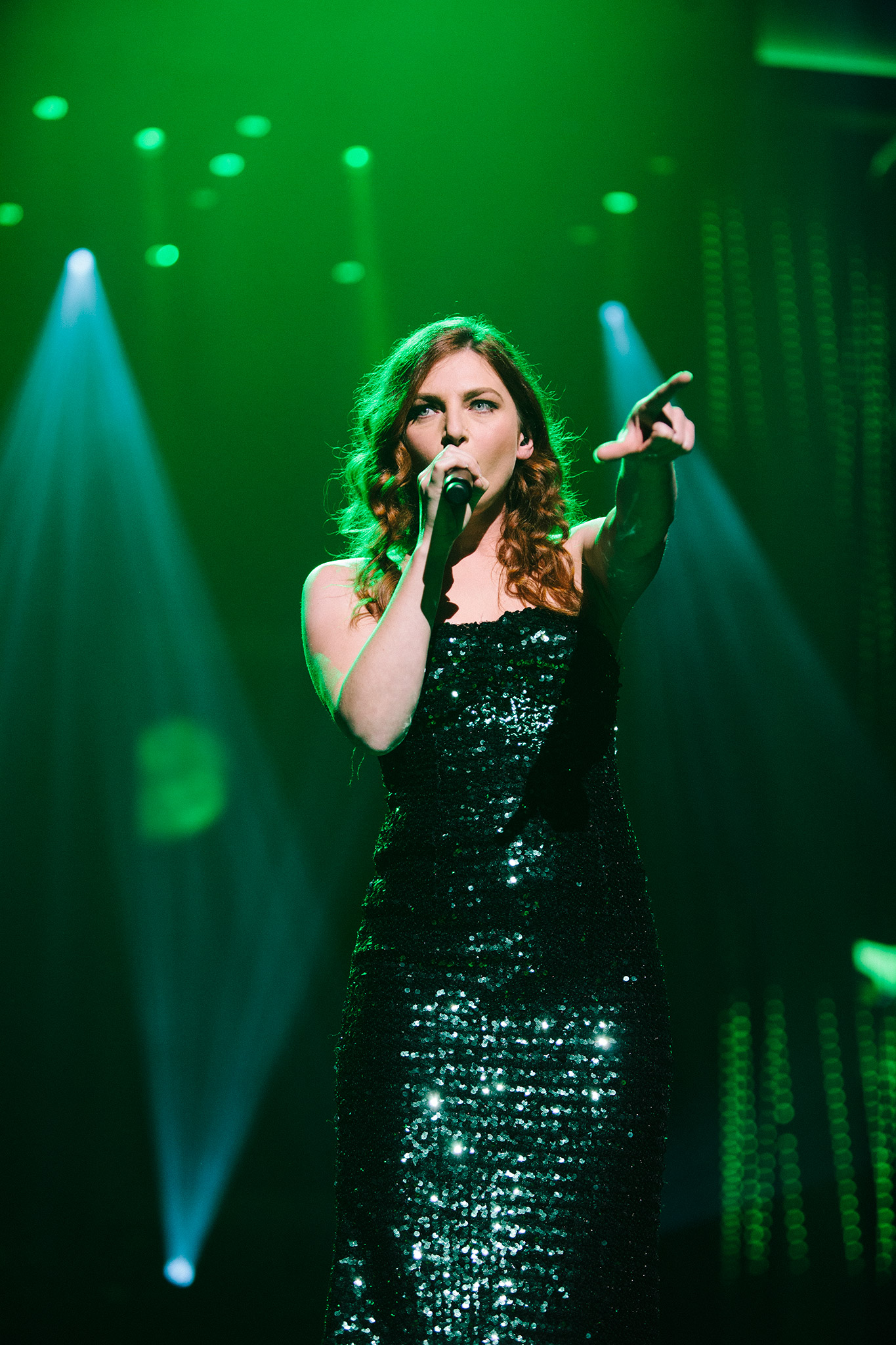
Verkaik, 2014

Show	Location	Role	Year	Ref
Elisabeth	Scheveningen, The Netherlands	Ensemble	2001	
Jeans 11	Tour, The Netherlands	Soloist	2001–2002	
The Three Musketeers	Rotterdam, The Netherlands	Ensemble / understudy Queen Anna and Milady de Winter	2003	
Eternity	Rotterdam, The Netherlands	Barbara	2004	
We Will Rock You	Cologne, Germany	Killer Queen u/s	2004–2005	
Elisabeth	Thun, Switzerland	Elisabeth	2006	
We Will Rock You	Cologne, Germany	Killer Queen	2006	
Wicked	Stuttgart, Germany	Elphaba	2007–2010	
Aida	Tecklenburg, Germany	Amneris	2009	
Wicked	Oberhausen Germany	Elphaba	2010–2011	
Wicked	Scheveningen, The Netherlands	Elphaba	2011–2013	
Wicked	New York (Broadway), United States of America	Elphaba	2013	
Mamma Mia!	Stuttgart, Germany	Donna	2013	
Wicked	London (West End), United Kingdom	Elphaba	2013–2014	
Women on the Verge of a Nervous Breakdown	London (West End), United Kingdom	Paulina	2014–2015	
Tarzan	Stuttgart, Germany	Kala	2015–2016	
Wicked	London (West End), United Kingdom	Elphaba	2017	
Ghost the Musical	Berlin, Germany	Molly	2017–2018	
Bat Out of Hell	Oberhausen, Germany	Sloane	2018–2019	
Best of Broadway	Tour, The Netherlands	-	2019	
Aida in Concert	Rosmalen, The Netherlands	Amneris	2019	
Women on the Verge of a Nervous Breakdown	Amsterdam, the Netherlands	Pepa	2019	
Annie	Tour, The Netherlands	Mrs. Hannigan	2019–2020	
Come from Away	Tour, The Netherlands	Beverly Bass, Annette	2021–2022	
Rebecca	Vienna, Austria	Mrs. Danvers	2022–2023	
Frozen	Hamburg, Germany	Elsa	2023–2024	
& Juliet	Hamburg, Germany	Anne Hathaway	2024–2025	

== Concert performances ==
- Pfingstgala (Tecklenburg, Openluchttheater, Whit Monday 2006, 2008, 2014 and 2020)
- Concert with Mark Seibert (Stuttgart, Palladium Theater, 26 May 2008)
- Benefit concert with Roberta Valentini (Oberhausen, Metronomtheatre 30 August 2010)
- Simply the Music of Scott Alan (London, New Players Theatre, 26 September 2010)
- Sommernacht des Musicals (Germany, Dinslaken, 2011, 2016 & 2025)
- Backstage with Philippe Ducloux (Essen, hall Lukas, 22 and 23 January 2011)
- Concert with Scott Alan (Hamburger Kammerspiele, 20 June 2011)
- Concert with Jason Robert Brown & Scott Alan (New York, Birdland, 22 August 2011)
- "Like Nobody Else..." concert with Alex Melcher (Oberhausen, hall Ebertbad, 31 March 2012)
- Jesus Christ Superstar in Concert – Maria (Amsterdam, DeLaMar Theater, 16 and 17 March 2015)
- Solo concert with Victoria Hamilton-Barritt and James Fox (London, Ambassadors Theatre, 25 August 2015)
- Solo concert with Stephen Schwartz (New York, 54 Below, 27 & 28 August 2015)
- From Broadway to Breda (Breda, Chassé Theatre, 15 November 2015)
- Disney in Concert (Germany, Switzerland, Austria, 2016, 2017 & 2024)
- Song and Dance of Broadway with Earl Carpenter, Siobhan Dillon, Eric Kunze, Jaime Verazin, Michelle Camaya, Daniel Gaymon, and Colby Lindeman (Tokyu Theatre Orb, Tokyo, 7–9 October 2017)
- Bevrijdingsfestival with CB Milton, Bastiaan Everink, and Noa Wildschut (Amsterdam, Amstel, 5 May 2018)
- SpaceXperience (Ziggo Dome, Amsterdam, 3 November 2018)
- Alexander Klaws – Jetzt und Hier (Kulturwerk am See, Norderstedt 7 May 2018, Filharmonie, Filderstadt, 28 May 2018 & Admiralspalast Studio, Berlin, 18 June 2018)
- Disney's Broadway Hits with Anton Zetterholm, Ava Brennan, and Shaune Scoffery (Royal Albert Hall, London, 1 & 2 March 2019)
- De Uitmarkt with René van Kooten and Stanly Burleson (2019)
- 92nd Academy Award Ceremony with nine other international Elsas (Dolby Theatre, Los Angeles, CA, U.S., February 9, 2020)
- And Now... with Mark Kuypers and Bart van Hoof (DeLaMar Theater, Amsterdam, 9 July 2020 – 25 July 2020)
- Brightest Colors (Niederrhein-Stadion, Oberhausen, August 8, 2020, July 5, 2021)
- Power Women Sessions (26 February 2021)
- Verkaik's 25th anniversary concerts in 2025: DeLaMar, Amsterdam (11–12 April), Neue Flora, Hamburg (16 June), Stage Apollo Theater, Stuttgart (23 June), and Neue Flora, Hamburg (1 September).
- Leading Ladies Tour throughout the Netherlands (November 2025 to January 2026)

== Discography ==
=== Cast recordings ===
- Jeans 11 (Jeanscompany, 2001)
- Eternity (Orkest Kon. Luchtmacht, 2003)
- Drie Musketiers (Three Musketeers) (Joop van den Ende Theaterproducties, 2003); DVD release
- We Will Rock You – Das Original Musical (Parlophone, 2005)
- Wicked, German cast recording (Stage Entertainment Germany, 2007) Two of her tracks from the album, "Solang ich dich hab" ("As Long As You're Mine") and "Gutes tun" ("No Good Deed") were included on the Broadway 5th anniversary cast recording Bonus CD (Decca Broadway, 2008) also on the Broadway 2013 Deluxe edition's 2nd CD (Decca Broadway, 2013).
- Frozen, Dutch cast recording (Walt Disney Records, 2014)
- Frozen, German cast recording (Walt Disney Records, 2014)
- Olaf's Frozen Adventure, Dutch cast recording (Walt Disney Records, 2017)
- Olaf's Frozen Adventure, German cast recording (Walt Disney Records, 2017)
- Frozen II, Dutch cast recording (Walt Disney Records, 2019)
- Frozen II, German cast recording (Walt Disney Records, 2019)
- Frozen Fever, German cast recording (Walt Disney Records, 2021)
- Frozen Fever, Dutch cast recording (Walt Disney Records, 2021)
- Rebecca (HitSquad Records, 2022)

=== Other albums ===
- Stage Entertainment Presents Part 9 (Stage Entertainment, 2007)
- Musical Gala Ludwigsburg (Sound Of Music, 2008)
- Stage Entertainment Presents Part 10 (Stage Entertainment, 2008)
- Musicalballads Unplugged – with Mark Seibert (Sound of Music, 2010)
- Superstars des Musicals – collection of 3 CDs (Sound of Music, 2010)
- Best of Musical – Gala 2010 (Stage Entertainment, 2010)
- Scott Alan: What I Wanna Be when I Grow Up (Billy-Boo Records, 2012)
- Scott Alan: Live – double CD recorded at Birdland (Billy-Boo Records, 2012)
- Let It Go: The Complete Set (From "Frozen) (Walt Disney Records, 2014)
- Disney's Grootste Hits (Walt Disney Records, 2014)
- Reflection – Kevin Tarte (Sound of Music)
- Kidszone – Zomer 2015 (Universal Music, 2015)
- Disney Magic Moments (Die Größten Disney Filmhits) (Walt Disney Records, 2016)
- Disney's Grootste Hits (Walt Disney Records, 2024)

== Filmography ==
Year	Title	Role	Notes	Ref
2004	Barbie as the Princess and the Pauper	Erika	Dutch version (voice)	
2008	Barbie & the Diamond Castle	Lydia	Dutch version (voice)	
2012	Goede tijden, slechte tijden	Elphaba	Dutch TV show	
2013	Frozen	Elsa	Dutch version (voice) German version (singing only)	
2015	Frozen Fever	Elsa	Dutch version (voice) German version (singing only)	
2016	LEGO Frozen Northern Lights	Elsa	Dutch version (voice) German version (singing only)	
2017	Olaf's Frozen Adventure	Elsa	Dutch version (voice) German version (singing only)	
2018	Ralph Breaks the Internet	Elsa	Dutch version (voice)	
2019	Frozen II	Elsa	Dutch version (voice); German version (singing only)	
2024	Wicked	Wiz-O-Mania Super Star	Dutch version (voice); German version (voice)	
