= 30th Japan Academy Film Prize =

Japanese film awards in 2007

- Date: February 16, 2007
- Site: Grand Prince Hotel New Takanawa, Tokyo, Japan
- Hosted by: Hiroshi Sekiguchi; Sayuri Yoshinaga

Highlights
- Most nominations: Love and Honor (12); Hula Girls (10)

The 30th Japan Academy Film Prize (第30回日本アカデミー賞) is the 30th edition of the Japan Academy Film Prize, an award presented by the Nippon Academy-Sho Association to award excellence in filmmaking. It awarded the best films of 2006 and it took place on February 16, 2007 at the Grand Prince Hotel New Takanawa in Tokyo, Japan.

Due to agency's policy, Takuya Kimura declined to receive the prize for Outstanding Performance by an Actor in a Leading Role.

== Nominees ==
=== Awards ===
Picture of the Year	Animation of the Year
Hula Girls; Memories of Tomorrow; Yamato; The Uchōten Hotel; Love and Honor	The Girl Who Leapt Through Time; Arashi no Yoru ni; Tales from Earthsea; Brave Story; Detective Conan: The Private Eyes' Requiem
Director of the Year	Screenplay of the Year
Lee Sang-il – Hula Girls; Junya Sato – Yamato; Tetsuya Nakashima – Memories of Matsuko; Kōki Mitani – The Uchōten Hotel; Yoji Yamada – Love and Honor	Lee Sang-il and Daisuke Habara – Hula Girls; Hakaru Sunamoto and Yuiko Miura – Memories of Tomorrow; Tetsuya Nakajima – Memories of Matsuko; Kōki Mitani – The Uchōten Hotel; Yoji Yamada, Emiko Hiramatsu, Ichirō Yamamoto – Love and Honor
Outstanding Performance by an Actor in a Leading Role	Outstanding Performance by an Actress in a Leading Role
Ken Watanabe – Memories of Tomorrow; Joe Odagiri – Sway; Satoshi Tsumabuki – Nada Sōsō; Akira Terao – The Professor's Beloved Equation; Kōji Yakusho – The Uchōten Hotel	Miki Nakatani – Memories of Matsuko; Rei Dan – Love and Honor; Masami Nagasawa – Nada Sōsō; Kanako Higuchi – Memories of Tomorrow; Yasuko Matsuyuki – Hula Girls
Outstanding Performance by an Actor in a Supporting Role	Outstanding Performance by an Actress in a Supporting Role
Takashi Sasano – Love and Honor; Takao Osawa – Metro ni Notte; Teruyuki Kagawa – Sway; Kōichi Satō – The Uchōten Hotel; Kenichi Matsuyama - Death Note	Yū Aoi – Hula Girls; Yū Aoi – Yamato; Sumiko Fuji – Hula Girls; Masako Motai – Kamome Diner; Kaori Momoi – Love and Honor
Outstanding Achievement in Music	Outstanding Achievement in Cinematography
Gabriele Roberto and Takeshi Shibuya – Memories of Matsuko; Michiru Ōshima – Memories of Tomorrow; Isao Tomita – Love and Honor; Joe Hisaishi – Yamato; Yūsuke Honma – The Uchōten Hotel	Mutsuo Naganuma – Love and Honor; Shōichi Atō – Memories of Matsuko; Yoshitaka Sakamoto – Yamato; Hideo Yamamoto – The Uchōten Hotel; Hideo Yamamoto – Hula Girls
Outstanding Achievement in Lighting Direction	Outstanding Achievement in Art Direction
Takeshi Nakasu – Love and Honor; Tarō Kimura – Memories of Matsuko; Takeshi Ōkubo – Yamato; Akira Ono – Hula Girls; Akira Ono – The Uchōten Hotel	Toshiyuki Matsumiya and Nariyuki Kondō – Yamato; Towako Kuwajima – Memories of Matsuko; Yōhei Taneda – The Uchōten Hotel; Yōhei Taneda – Hula Girls; Mitsuo Degawa – Love and Honor
Outstanding Achievement in Sound Recording	Outstanding Achievement in Film Editing
Nobuhiko Matsukage and Tetsuo Segawa – Yamato; Kazumi Kishida – Love and Honor; Junichi Shima and Tadao Tasai – Memories of Matsuko; Mitsugu Shiratori – Hula Girls; Tetsuo Segawa – The Uchōten Hotel	Yoshiyuki Koike – Memories of Matsuko; Iwai Ishii – Love and Honor; Tsuyoshi Imai – Hula Girls; Sōichi Ueno – The Uchōten Hotel; Takeo Yoneda – Yamato
Outstanding Foreign Language Film	Newcomer of the Year
Flags of Our Fathers; Crash; The Da Vinci Code; Pirates of the Caribbean: Dead Man's Chest; Hotel Rwanda	Kenta Suga – Hanada Shōnen Shi Yūrei to Himitsu no Tunnel; Muga Tsukaji – Mamiya kyodai; Mokomichi Hayami – Rough; Kenichi Matsuyama – Yamato; Yū Aoi – Hula Girls; Rei Dan – Love and Honor; Shizuyo Yamasaki – Hula Girls; Yui - Midnight Sun
Special Award from the Association	Special Award from the Chairman
Kazuyuki Suzuki (Cinema Art Special Craft)	Akira Ifukube (Music); Shohei Imamura (Director); Takahiro Tamura (Actor); Tetsurō Tamba (Actor); Takeomi Nagayama (The president of Shochiku)
Award for Distinguished Service from the Chairman	Popularity Award
Limit of Love: Umizaru Project Team	Hula Girls (Production Category); Muga Tsukaji – Mamiya kyodai (Actor Category)
Shigeru Okada Prize	
Robot Communications	
