= Memories of Tomorrow =

- Film poster
- Directed by: Yukihiko Tsutsumi
- Screenplay by: Hakaru Sunamoto; Uiko Miura
- Based on: Ashita no Kioku by Hiroshi Ogiwara
- Produced by: Jun Sakagumi; Tatsuo Kawamura
- Starring: Ken Watanabe; Kanako Higuchi; Kenji Sakaguchi; Kazue Fukiishi; Asami Mizukawa
- Cinematography: Satoru Karasawa
- Edited by: Nobuyuki Ito
- Music by: Michiru Ōshima
- Distributed by: Toei Company
- Release dates: May 13, 2006 (Japan); May 10, 2007 (United States)
- Running time: 122 minutes
- Country: Japan
- Language: Japanese
- Box office: ¥2.2 billion

Memories of Tomorrow (Japanese: 明日の記憶, Hepburn: Ashita no Kioku) is a 2006 Japanese drama film starring Ken Watanabe and Kanako Higuchi, and directed by Yukihiko Tsutsumi. The film is based on a novel of the same title published by Hiroshi Ogiwara in 2004. Toei Company released the film on May 13, 2006, in Japan, where it was a financial success. Watanabe won multiple awards for his performance in the film.

== Plot ==
The film begins by showing a scene of a man who is disabled by Alzheimer's disease, set in 2010. The story proper begins by switching back to an earlier stage in the life of the man, Masayuki Saeki, in 2004. Saeki is a brilliant and successful advertising company executive. He is shown to be a prime example of an ideal Japanese white-collar worker. Saeki is strict, well organized, hard-working, devoted to his job, and sets very high standards for himself and his subordinates. However, he is soon shocked to realize that he is failing to live up to his perfect standards. He starts inexplicably forgetting things - appointments, details of his work, and his knowledge of the layout of Tokyo. Following this, Saeki is diagnosed with Alzheimer's disease, to which he reacts with great anger, disbelief and despair. What follows through the rest of the film is a tragic, emotional and very human portrayal of the suffering and the decline of this once powerful, soaring man to that of a pitiful state that resembles a second childhood as the disease wears him down. As the years pass, Saeki's memory worsens. He leaves work, and lives at home, where he is cared for by his devoted wife, Emiko. Inevitably, tensions surface between Masayuki and his wife and daughter, and it reaches the point where Emiko's life revolves around taking care of her debilitated husband.

== Cast ==
- Ken Watanabe as Masayuki Saeki
- Kanako Higuchi as Emiko Saeki
- Kenji Sakaguchi as Naoya Ito
- Kazue Fukiishi as Rie Saeki
- Asami Mizukawa as Keiko Ikuno
- Noritake Kinashi as Shigeyuki Kizaki
- Mitsuhiro Oikawa as Takehiro Yoshida
- Eriko Watanabe as Kimiko Hamano
- Teruyuki Kagawa as Atsushi Kawamura

== Release ==
Memories of Tomorrow was released by Toei Company on May 13, 2006, in Japan. The film was a financial success, grossing ¥2.2 billion at the box office.

== Reception ==
Roger Ebert praised the film, awarding it 3.5 out of 4 stars and writing, "The movie isn’t structured like a melodrama, but reflects a slow fading of the light. There are moments of almost unbearable sadness, as in what he reveals to a nurse at the end of a tour of a nursing home. And we observe the indifference of the company where he has been a salaryman all his life: Yes, thanks for your contribution, now go quietly, please, and don’t let the clients know. Some films on Alzheimer’s attempt to show an upside. I don’t think there is an upside. At least with cancer you get to be yourself until you die."

== Awards and nominations ==
The film received eight awards and four nominations from various sources, including:

30th Japan Academy Awards

- Won: Outstanding Performance by an Actor in a Leading Role (Ken Watanabe)
- Nominated: Picture of the Year
- Nominated: Screenplay of the Year (Hakaru Sunamoto and Yuiko Miura)
- Nominated: Outstanding Performance by an Actress in a Leading Role (Kanako Higuchi)
- Nominated: Outstanding Achievement in Music (Michiru Ōshima)

80th Kinema Junpo Best Ten Awards

- Best Ten List: 8th place

31st Hochi Film Awards

- Won: Best Actor (Ken Watanabe)

28th Yokohama Film Festival

- Won: Best Supporting Actress (Kazue Fukiishi, shared with Yūko Nakamura)

49th Blue Ribbon Awards

- Won: Best Actor (Ken Watanabe)
- Won: Best Supporting Actor (Teruyuki Kagawa, also won for Sway and Deguchi no Nai Umi)
