= 28th Yokohama Film Festival =

2007 film festival in Yokohama, Japan

- Location: Kannai Hall, Yokohama, Kanagawa, Japan
- Founded: 1980
- Festival date: 4 February 2007

The 28th Yokohama Film Festival (第28回ヨコハマ映画祭) was held on 4 February 2007 in Kannai Hall, Yokohama, Kanagawa, Japan.

== Awards ==
- Best Film: Sway
- Best Actor: Teruyuki Kagawa – Sway
- Best Actress: Yū Aoi – Hula Girls, Honey and Clover
- Best Supporting Actor: Takashi Sasano – Metro ni Notte, A Hardest Night!!, Tsuribaka Nisshi 17: Ato wa Noto nare Hama to nare!, Adan
- Best Supporting Actress:
  - Yūko Nakamura – Strawberry Shortcakes
  - Kazue Fukiishi – What the Snow Brings, Tegami, Memories of Tomorrow
- Best Director: Miwa Nishikawa – Sway
- Best New Director: Takayuki Nakamura – Yokohama Mary
- Best Screenplay: Miwa Nishikawa – Sway
- Best Cinematography: Isao Ishii – Strawberry Shortcakes
- Best New Talent:
  - Kenichi Matsuyama – Death Note, Yamato, Oyayubi Sagashi
  - Yuriko Yoshitaka – Noriko's Dinner Table
- Special Jury Prize: Takayuki Nakamura – Yokohama Mary

== Best 10 ==
1. Sway
2. Hula Girls
3. Memories of Matsuko
4. What the Snow Brings
5. Kamome Shokudo
6. Yokohama Mary
7. Strawberry Shortcakes
8. It's Only Talk
9. The Professor's Beloved Equation
10. The Girl Who Leapt Through Time

runner-up: The Blossoming of Kamiya Etsuko
