= Haru's Journey =

- Cover art of DVD.

Japanese name
- Kanji: 春との旅
Transcriptions
- Revised Hepburn: Haru to no Tabi
- Directed by: Masahiro Kobayashi
- Written by: Masahiro Kobayashi
- Produced by: Muneyuki Kii; Naoko Kobayashi
- Starring: Tatsuya Nakadai; Eri Tokunaga; Hideji Ōtaki; Yūko Tanaka; Naho Toda; Teruyuki Kagawa
- Cinematography: Kenji Takama
- Edited by: Naoki Kaneko
- Music by: Junpei Sakuma
- Production companies: Hokkaido Shinbun Press; Toei Video Company; Laterna; Mainichi Shimbun; Monkey Town Productions; Sapporo Station General Development
- Distributed by: Asmik Ace
- Release date: May 22, 2010 (Japan)
- Running time: 134 minutes
- Country: Japan
- Language: Japanese

Haru's Journey (Japanese: 春との旅, Hepburn: Haru to no Tabi) is a 2010 Japanese drama film directed by Masahiro Kobayashi. It was released in Japan on 22 May. The film stars Tatsuya Nakadai as Tadao, the lead actor; Eri Tokunaga as Haru, the lead actress; Hideji Ōtaki as Shigeo Kanamoto (Tadao's brother); Teruyuki Kagawa as Shinichi Tsuda (Haru's father); Naho Toda as Nobuko Tsuda (Shinichi's wife). The film was distributed by Asmik Ace and T-Joy.

== Cast ==
- Tatsuya Nakadai as Tadao Nakai
- Eri Tokunaga as Haru Nakai
- Hideji Ōtaki as Shigeo Kanemoto
- Kin Sugai as Keiko Kanemoto
- Kaoru Kobayashi as Kinoshita
- Yuko Tanaka as Aiko Shimizu
- Chikage Awashima as Shigeko Ichikawa
- Akira Emoto as Michio Nakai
- Jun Miho as Akiko Nakai
- Naho Toda as Nobuko Tsuda
- Teruyuki Kagawa as Shinichi Tsuda

== Reception ==
The film won the 65th Mainichi Film Award for Excellence Film, and the actress Eri Tokunaga won the Sponichi Grand Prix Newcomer Award for her role in the film. Mark Schilling of The Japan Times gave the film 4 out of 5 stars.
