= List of samurai films of the 2000s =

A list of Samurai films released in the 2000s.

| Title | Director | Cast | Release date | Notes |
|---|---|---|---|---|
| Dora-heita | | | 2002 | |
| The Hidden Blade | | | 2013 | |
| The Last Samurai | | | 2003 | |
| Love and Honor | | | 2010 | |
| The Twilight Samurai | | | 2002 | |
| When the last sword is drawn | | | 2002 | |
| Zatoichi the blind Swordsman | | | 2002 | |
