= Takashi Sasano =

Japanese actor (born 1948)

- Born: 22 June 1948 (age 78); Ichinomiya, Hyōgo Prefecture, Japan
- Occupation: Actor
- Years active: 1972–present
- Known for: Departures
- Children: 4

Takashi Sasano (笹野 高史, Sasano Takashi; born June 22, 1948) is a Japanese actor.

== Career ==
Sasano has appeared in Kiyoshi Kurosawa's films Bright Future (2003) and Before We Vanish (2017). He also appeared in Amir Naderi's 2011 film Cut.

== Filmography ==
=== Film ===
- Tora-san's Island Encounter (1985)
- Final Take (1986)
- Tobu yume o shibaraku minai (1990)
- A Class to Remember (1993)
- The Geisha House (1999)
- Keiho (1999)
- Last Scene (2002)
- Bright Future (2003)
- No One's Ark (2003)
- The Hidden Blade (2004)
- Ame Yori Setsunaku (2005)
- Metro ni Notte (2006)
- Love and Honor (2006)
- Nezu no Ban (2006)
- Tsuribaka Nisshi 17 (2006)
- Adrift in Tokyo (2007)
- Kabei: Our Mother (2008)
- 10 Promises to My Dog (2008)
- Departures (2008)
- Zen (2009)
- Mt. Tsurugidake (2009)
- Dear Doctor (2009)
- Asahiyama Zoo Story: Penguins in the Sky (2009)
- Surely Someday (2010)
- About Her Brother (2010)
- Wasao (2011)
- Cut (2011)
- Hara-Kiri: Death of a Samurai (2011)
- Slapstick Brothers (2011)
- Tenchi: The Samurai Astronomer (2012)
- Thermae Romae (2012)
- 125 Years Memory (2015), Mayor Sato
- Creepy (2016)
- Golden Orchestra (2016)
- What a Wonderful Family! (2016)
- Before We Vanish (2017)
- Recall (2018)
- What a Wonderful Family! 3: My Wife, My Life (2018)
- Life in Overtime (2018)
- Masquerade Hotel (2019)
- Tora-san, Wish You Were Here (2019), Gozen-sama
- Haruka no Sue (2019)
- The 47 Ronin in Debt (2019), Ochiai Yozaemon
- They Say Nothing Stays the Same (2019)
- Labyrinth of Cinema (2020)
- Wife of a Spy (2020), Dr. Nozaki
- The Devil Wears Jūnihitoe (2020)
- Nishinari Goro's 400 Million Yen (2021)
- Riverside Mukolitta (2022)
- What to Do with the Dead Kaiju? (2022), the Minister of Finance
- Yudo: The Way of the Bath (2023)
- We Make Antiques! Osaka Dreams (2023)
- Nemesis: The Mystery of the Golden Spiral (2023)
- Immersion (2023)
- The Silent Service (2023), the prime minister Toshio Takegami
- Corpo a Corpo (2023)
- Daisuke Jigen (2023)
- The 35-Year Promise (2025)
- Boy's Wish: We Can Use Magic Once in a Lifetime (2025)
- Babanba Banban Vampire (2025)
- The Silent Service: The Battle of the Arctic Ocean (2025), Toshio Takegami
- A Light in the Harbor (2025), Sadatoshi Arakawa
- Tokyo Taxi (2025), Seiichiro Abe
- Kingdom 5: The Clash of Souls (2026), Cai Ze

=== Television ===
- Aoi (2000), Torii Mototada
- Tenchijin (2009), Toyotomi Hideyoshi
- Shinzanmono (2010)
- Man of Destiny (2012), Takeo Fukude
- Samurai Rebellion (2013)
- Keisei Saimin no Otoko Part 1 (2015), Inoue Kaoru
- Shuriken Sentai Ninninger (2015), Yoshitaka Igasaki
- Nobunaga Moyu (2016), Yoshida Kanemi
- Chiisana Hashi de (2017)
- Ishitsubute (2017)
- Brother and Sister (2018)
- Wife of a Spy (2020), Dr. Nozaki
- Love You as the World Ends (2021), Masaomi Uwajima
- Nakamura Nakazo: Shusse no Kizahashi (2021)
- My Ex-Boyfriend's Last Will (2022), Genta Murayama
- The Silent Service (2024–27), the prime minister Toshio Takegami
- Last Samurai Standing (2025)

== Awards ==
Years	Awards
2007	30th Japan Academy Prize: Best Supporting Actor for Love and Honor
2007	28th Yokohama Film Festival: Best Supporting Actor for Nezu no Ban, Tsuribaka Nisshi 17 and Metro ni Notte
