= Miwa Nishikawa =

Japanese director and screenwriter (born 1974)

- Nishikawa in 2026
- Born: July 8, 1974 (age 52); Asaminami-ku, Hiroshima, Japan
- Occupations: Film director Screenwriter

Miwa Nishikawa (西川美和, Nishikawa Miwa; born July 8, 1974 in Asaminami-ku, Hiroshima) is a Japanese director and screenwriter. Nishikawa received a degree in literature from the University of Waseda, and after working on several independent films as well as catching the eye of Hirokazu Kore-eda, her film making career took off with her first film, Wild Berries, which won the award for best screenplay at the Mainichi Film Award. In addition to her film making career, Nishikawa has also written a book titled The Long Excuse.

== Life and career ==
Nishikawa began her film career as a college student working as a staff member on Hirokazu Koreeda's 1998 film After Life. Soon afterward she was an assistant director for Yoshimitsu Morita on his 1999 thriller The Black House (黒い家, Kuroi ie). and again on Kore-eda's 2001 movie Distance. When Nishikawa went on to write and direct her first feature film, the September 2003 release, Wild Berries, Koreeda was the producer. The film won the Best New Director award at the 2004 Yokohama Film Festival, the Best New Director prize at the 13th Japanese Professional Movie Awards and the Best Screenplay Award and one of the Sponichi Grand Prize New Talent Awards at the 58th Mainichi Film Concours for 2003.

After directing a segment in the omnibus work Fiimeiru, Nishikawa wrote and directed her second feature film Sway in 2006. The film brought Nishikawa both the Best Screenplay and Best Director awards at the 28th Yokohama Film Festival and the film won First Place Best Film at the festival. In 2009, she directed her third full-length film Dear Doctor and also wrote the screenplay which she adapted from her own novel. Nishikawa won the Best Screenplay award at the 31st Yokohama Film Festival where Dear Doctor took the Best Film Award. She also took the Best Director award at the 2009 Hochi Film Awards.

Nishikawa's next film, Dreams for Sale, about a young couple engaged in a marriage fraud scheme, was released in Japan in September 2012 and was shown at various international film festivals including the Toronto International Film Festival, the Chicago International Film Festival and at the Japan Society of New York. Nishikawa travelled to San Francisco for the film's screening at the first Japan Film Festival in San Francisco in August 2013. At an interview there she lamented the state of the Japanese film industry saying that it was boring because "nobody wants to embark on a venture."

== Film career ==
At the forefront of a constantly growing ring of contemporary Japanese film makers, Nishikawa attempts to sidestep issues of gender by embracing conventional imagery, representations and style. Breaking into film under the tutelage of acclaimed auteur Hirokazu Kore-eda, Nishikawa collaborated on her first film (Wild Berries) with him using a personally written script.

=== Wild Berries (2003) ===
Miwa Nishikawa's first feature film; in collaboration with Hirokazu Koreeda, a drama as well as an ironic comedy, launched her into the limelight. Wild Berries is a story of an ordinary family that turns unstable when their frivolous son Shuji returns home after a long absence. Tomoko, the responsible daughter of the family, is a grade school teacher. As the only member of the family who has a job and a good moral sense, the family sees her new boyfriend as a savior. The action begins when Tomoko Akechi, the daughter of the family, brings her fiancé home for dinner to meet the family. The boyfriend claims he is charmed by the Akechi's Industry, but the viewer finds out that the father is unemployed and slaving for money. The senile grandfather whom every member of the family secretly detests, dies suddenly, much to everyone's relief. At the grandfathers funeral, the prodigal son Shuji makes a grand entrance, narrowly saving Yoshiro (The Father) from an angry creditor. The arrival of Shuji seems too good to be true when he is able to swiftly evade creditors with a seemingly unending flow of cash. The alienated sister Tomoko, recalls Shuji boasting about a remote patch of wild berries not too far from their house. Tomoko tries to find this patch to no avail. Reminding Shuji of this incident, he offers to show her this patch. What happens during this hike is exactly the dangerous moral predicament that Tomoko is desperate to escape.

=== Sway (2006) ===
Director and screenwriter of this film; Nishikawa, with the help of distribution companies: Bandai Visual, Eisei Gekijo, Engine Film and TV Man Union, presents her second feature film. Sway is representative of Nishikawa's likeness of the pre-straight-to-video salad days of Japanese Cinema. The Japanese film, which stars Odagiri Jo and opened on only six screens in South Korea in August 2006, set the record for an "independent" movie by pulling 300,000 admissions in only fifteen days. Playboy Photographer Yakeru Hayakawa reluctantly returns to his family's rural home for his mother's funeral. Barely anything has changed; he is still the spoiled brat, the father is still a bully, the pushover brother Minoru is still working at the gas station and Hayakawa's Ex, Chieko, is still available. The short-lived reunion sparks the affection of the brothers creating a romantic rivalry. Visiting their childhood romping ground of Hasumi Gorge, the tension gives way to confrontation on an old rickety rope bridge. Chieko favours the glitzy Hayakawa over Minoru, who pleads with her to reconsider. Chieko falters in her footing, not in her resolve. It is unclear if Chieko fell to her death or if she was pushed. In the following court case, the innocence and character of each brother stands trial leaving only one behind bars.

=== Dear Doctor (2009) ===
Nishikawa's third feature film was Dear Doctor. Dr. Ino Osamu is the primary physician in a small country village. The entire village depends upon him and his assistant, Nurse Otake, for almost anything health related. A recent medical-school graduate, Keisuke is mentored by the two and learns what his big city degree didn't teach him, the emotional connection between doctor and patient. Keisuke is impressed with Ino's relationship with his patients and aspires to emulate the same qualities. However, when the good doctor goes missing, police detectives discover that Dr. Ino's presence in the town was just as mysterious as his disappearance. Beginning with Keisuke's involvement with the country clinic, the police try to piece together this vanishing act.

=== The Long Excuse (2015) ===
The story outlines the life of a best-selling author during the year after his wife dies in a tragic accident. His loss puts him into a period of deep reflection. In his mid forties, novelist Kei Tsumura still has his good looks, and is at the peak of his popularity, appearing on television. Quitting his job to focus on writing, Kei fell on the support of his now deceased wife. Being timid yet self-absorbed provided social challenges for him. His wife Natsuko had ventured to the ski slopes one winter with Yuki Omiya, a highschool friend, when their bus plunges off the mountain killing them both. Meanwhile, Kei has taken advantage of Natsuko's absence and is in the midst of carnal pleasure at the time of the accident, leaving him guilty and grieving. Later, Kei meets with the deceased Yuki's husband Yoichi, feels a sense of familiarity, and becomes involved with helping Yoichi with his children. Kei also discovers an unsent text addressed to him on his wife's phone that reads: "I don't love you anymore. Not at all.". Kei blows up and breaks off all connection with the outside world, severing his weekly visits with Yoichi even picking a fight. Yoichi is arrested for beating up a sex worker, and when Kei bails him out, their efforts to mend what they had are useless. Kei eventually finds himself and begins to write on his and his wife's relationship; winning him a minor literary award.

=== Under the Open Sky (2020) ===
Under the Open Sky

== Writing career ==
Aside from Nishikawa's film career, her writing has expanded to the world of literature. In 2006 her second feature film, Yureru (Sway), was showcased in the Directors’ Fortnight at Cannes; she received the Yomiuri Prize for Literature (Drama & Film) for the script, and subsequently made her publishing debut by novelizing the work. Her 2009 collection of stories Kinō no Kamisama (Gods of Yesterday) was shortlisted for the Naoki Prize, and her 2015 novel Nagai iiwake (The Long Excuse) became a candidate for the Yamamoto Shūgorō Prize.

== Filmography ==
Year	Title	Role(s)		Ref.
Year	Title	Director	Writer	Ref.
2003	Wild Berries	Yes	Yes	
2006	Sway	Yes	Yes	
2009	Dear Doctor	Yes	Yes	
2012	Dreams for Sale	Yes	Yes	
2016	The Long Excuse	Yes	Yes	
2020	Under the Open Sky	Yes	Yes	
2026	Children Untold	Yes	Yes	

== Recurring collaborators ==
Work Actor	2003	2006	2009	2012	2016	2020
Work Actor	! class="nowrap ts-vertical-header " style="" | Wild Berries	Sway	Dear Doctor	Dreams for Sale	The Long Excuse	Under the Open Sky
Teruyuki Kagawa						
Tamae Andō						
Shōfukutei Tsurube II						
Chikako Hara						
Katsuya Kobayashi						

== Bibliography ==
- Gods of Yesterday (Kinō no kamisama), 2009
- The Long Excuse (Nagai iiwake), 2015

== Awards ==
Year	Film	Award	Competition
2003	Wild Berries	Best Screenplay	Mainichi Film Award
2004	Wild Berries	Best New Director	Yokohama Film Festival
2004	Wild Berries	Best New Director	13th Japanese Professional Movie Awards
2007	Sway	Best Screenplay; Best Director; Best Film	28th Yokohama Film Festival
2009	Dear Doctor	Best Screenplay; Best Film	31st Yokohama Film Festival
2009	Dear Doctor	Best Director	Hochi Film Awards
