= Suki da =

Suki da (好きだ) means "I like you" in Japanese. It may refer to:

- Suki da (song), a song by Yoasobi
- Su-ki-da, a 2005 Japanese film
