= Kazue Fukiishi =

Japanese actress and former gravure idol (born 1982)

Kazue Fukuyama
- 福山 一恵
- Born: Kazue Fukiishi (吹石 一恵); September 28, 1982 (age 43); Kashiba, Nara, Japan
- Occupation: Actress
- Years active: 1997–present
- Spouse: Masaharu Fukuyama (m. 2015)
- Children: 1

Kazue Fukiishi (吹石 一恵, Fukiishi Kazue) is a Japanese actress and former gravure idol. She won the award for best supporting actress at the 28th Yokohama Film Festival for What the Snow Brings, Tegami, and Memories of Tomorrow.

== Career ==
Fukiishi starred in Takuji Suzuki's Gegege's Wife in 2010.

She co-starred with Aoi Miyazaki, Sakura Ando and Shiori Kutsuna in Hiroshi Ishikawa's Petal Dance in 2013.

== Personal life ==
On September 28, 2015, Fukiishi's 33rd birthday, she married actor and singer Masaharu Fukuyama. Their first child was born on December 22, 2016.

== Filmography ==
=== Films ===
Year	Title	Role	Notes	Ref.
2003	Samurai Resurrection	Ohina		
2003	Ultraman Cosmos vs. Ultraman Justice: The Final Battle	Juri		
2004	One Missed Call	Natsumi Konishi		
2005	What the Snow Brings	Makie		
2006	The Letter	Asami Nakajo		
2006	Noriko's Dinner Table	Noriko	Lead role	
2006	Memories of Tomorrow	Rie Saeki		
2007	Bubble Fiction: Boom or Bust	Kaoru Miyazaki		
2008	Happy Flight	Mari Tanaka		
2010	Gegege's Wife	Nunoe Mura	Lead role	
2010	13 Assassins	Otsuya / Upashi		
2013	The Eternal Zero	Keiko Saeki		
2013	Petal Dance	Miki	Lead role	
2026	The Honest Realtor: The Movie	Sanae Michibata		

=== Television ===
Year	Title	Role	Notes	Ref.
1998	Yanchakure	Togashi Hayakawa	Asadora	
2004	Shinsengumi!	Yagi Hide	Taiga drama	
2007	The Family	Ichiko Mima		
2007	Yamada Tarō Monogatari	Kyoko Torii		
2008	Scandal	Mayuko Samejima		
2008	Rookies	Rie Mayumi		
2009	Summer for Bureaucrats	Makoto Yamamoto		
2009	Nene: Onna Taikōki	Yodo-dono	Television film	
2011	High School Restaurant	Karuka Muraki		
2012	Lucky Seven	Yuki Kirihara		
2012	Taira no Kiyomori	Maiko	Taiga drama	
2014	The Family Season	Shuko Yoshioka	Lead role	
2024	Antihero	Reiko Momose		
2026	Reboot	Hinako Goroku		

== Awards and nominations ==
Year	Award	Category	Work(s)	Result	Ref.
2007	28th Yokohama Film Festival	Best Supporting Actress	What the Snow Brings, The Letter and Memories of Tomorrow	Won	
