= List of film and television productions aired or released in 8K =

A list of film and television productions aired or released in 8K resolution. It should not include productions that were upscaled to 8K but were neither filmed digitally in 8K (or higher resolution) nor scanned from an analog format in 8K (or higher resolution).

If the year is given, it should be the year of the first release (even if that first release was not in 8K or not a digital release at all).

This list does not currently include documentaries, with the exception of those making heavy use of CGI.

== # ==
- 2001: A Space Odyssey (1968)

== A ==
- Amagi Goe (2025)
- Angel and the Badman (1947) (Note: 8K videos on YouTube might require a specific browser, like Chrome.)
- An Artist of the Floating World (2019)

== B ==
- Barber Shop with a View of the Sea (2022)
- Beauties À La Carte (2013; short film)

== C ==
- The Chorus (2013; short film)

== D ==
- The Daily Dweebs (2017; short film)
- Das Boot (2018-2023; only season 3)
- Degueyo (1966)

== G ==
- Gift of Fire (2020)
- Go with God, Gringo (1966)
- Gochisou: Ise Ebi-hen (2022)
- Gochisou: Unagi-hen (2021)

== K ==
- Kikyo – The Return (2019)
- Kore ga kyoryu okoku Nipponda! (2018; 8K version released in 2019)

== L ==
- The Little Princess (1939)
- Luna (2016; short film by Kazuma Ikeda)

== M ==
- The Mahabharata (1989)
- The Man with the Golden Arm (1955)
- The Most Dangerous Game (1932)
- My Fair Lady (1964)

== N ==
- Night of the Living Dead (1968)

== P ==
- Prehistoric Planet Immersive (2024; for VR headsets only)
- Proof of Eternity (2025; original title: Eien ni Tsuite no Shomei)

== R ==
- Royal Wedding (1951)
- Rudyard Kipling's Jungle Book (1942)

== S ==
- Sakura Note (2021; short film)
- A Star Is Born (1937)
- The Stranger (1946)
- A Stranger in Shanghai (2019)
- Submerged (2024; short film; for VR headsets only)

== T ==
- The Ten Commandments (1923)
- Three Trees (2019; short film)
- Till the Clouds Roll By (1946)
- Topper Returns (1941)

== U ==
- Untact (2020)

== W ==
- West Side Story (1961)
- Wife of a Spy (2020)
- The Wind, the Storm (2022; original title: Kazeyo, Arashiyo)

== Y ==
- Yokomizo Seishi Short Stories (2016-2025; since season 4)

== Z ==
- Zenigata Heiji (2026)

== See also ==
- 8K resolution
