= Love and Honor (2006 film) =

Love and Honor Bushi no Ichibun
- Film poster
- Directed by: Yoji Yamada
- Written by: Yoji Yamada; Eriko Hiramatsu; Ichiro Yamamoto
- Based on: The Blind Sword: Echo of Vengeance by Shūhei Fujisawa
- Produced by: Junichi Sakamoto; Takeo Hisamatsu; Hiroshi Fukazawa; Ichiro Yamamoto
- Starring: Takuya Kimura; Rei Dan; Takashi Sasano; Bandō Mitsugorō X
- Cinematography: Mutsuo Naganuma
- Edited by: Iwao Ishii
- Music by: Isao Tomita
- Distributed by: Japan Shochiku; USA Funimation
- Release dates: October 20, 2006 (Tokyo); December 1, 2006 (Japan)
- Running time: 118 minutes
- Country: Japan
- Language: Japanese
- Box office: $33,755,574

Love and Honor (Japanese: 武士の一分, Hepburn: Bushi no Ichibun; lit. "Warrior's Honor") is a 2006 Japanese film set in the Edo period. It is the final film in Yoji Yamada's acclaimed Samurai Trilogy, following Twilight Samurai (2002) and The Hidden Blade (2004).

== Plot ==
Shinnojo, a low level samurai, lives with his pretty and loyal wife Kayo. Bored with his position as a food-taster for a feudal lord, he talks about opening a kendo school open to boys of all castes. Before he can act, he becomes ill after tasting some whelk sashimi and falls into a coma. An investigation reveals that the poisoning was not a human conspiracy, but a poor choice of food out of season. After three days, he awakes but finds that the toxin has blinded him.

His uncle is asked by Shinnojo's family how the couple will survive. He laments that he no longer knows anybody with influence, and asks Kayo if she knows of anybody. She relates how Toya Shimada, the chief duty officer in the castle and a samurai of high rank, offered to help and they tell her to act upon his offer of assistance.

A message from the castle brings the good news that Shinnojo's stipend of rice will remain the same, and for life; but his interfering aunt tells him that Kayo was seen with another man. He has Tokuhei, his faithful servant, follow her. Kayo notices that she is being followed, and although Tokuhei offers to cover for her, she reveals to Shinnojo that Shimada offered to help but at a price, shown when he forced himself upon her. He then solicited additional trysts by threatening to tell Shinnojo about the first. An enraged Shinnojo divorces her and orders her out of his house.

When it is revealed to him that Shimada had nothing to do with maintaining his stipend, but that it came out of gratitude from the lord of the clan himself, Shinnojo seeks to renew his skill with the sword as a blind man to avenge the dishonor of Kayo. Through Tokuhei, he sends a message to Shimada to set up a duel, with the additional message to not underestimate him. The two samurai meet at the stables near the river to decide their destinies. In the subsequent fight Shinnojo cuts off Shimada's arm. He leaves Shimada to live a horribly disfigured life, telling Tokuhei that he has now avenged Kayo's dishonor. The next day Shinnojo is informed that the injured Shimada refused to tell anyone what had happened or who injured him in the duel. That night Shimada committed seppuku and killed himself, as a samurai cannot live with only one arm. He dies without anyone knowing of his sin against the Mimura family, his violation of Kayo, or his own dishonorable injury by a blinded man.

Tokuhei tells Shinnojo he has found a girl to work in the kitchen and cook for him. After one taste of the girl's food, Shinnojo recognizes his wife's cooking, and calls Kayo to come into the house. Shinnojo and Kayo reconcile, with an understanding that they will begin their life together anew.

== Cast ==
- Takuya Kimura - Mimura Shinnojo
- Rei Dan - Mimura Kayo
- Takashi Sasano - Tokuhei
- Nenji Kobayashi - Higuchi Sakunosuke
- Ken Ogata - Kibe Magohachiro
- Kaori Momoi - Hatano Ine
- Bandō Mitsugorō X - Shimada Toya

== Reception ==
=== Critical reception ===
Review aggregator website Rotten Tomatoes gave the film an approval rating of 81% based on 21 reviews from western critics, with an average rating of 6.8/10. The website's critical consensus reads, "The third in director in Yoji Yamada's samurai trilogy is enjoyable, intricately made and well acted."

=== Awards and nominations ===
2005 Awards of the Japanese Academy

- Best Supporting Actor - Takashi Sasano
- Best Cinematography - Mutsuo Naganuma
- Best Lighting - Takeshi Nakasu
- Nomination - Best Film
- Nomination - Best Actor - Takuya Kimura (Declined his nomination)
- Nomination - Best Actress - Rei Dan
- Nomination - Best Supporting Actress - Kaori Momoi
- Nomination - Best Director - Yōji Yamada
- Nomination - Best Screenplay - Yōji Yamada, Emiko Hiramatsu, and Ichirō Yamamoto
- Nomination - Best Editing - Iwao Ishii
- Nomination - Best Art Direction - Mitsuo Degawa
- Nomination - Best Music Score - Isao Tomita
- Nomination - Best Sound - Kazumi Kishida

2007 Blue Ribbon Awards

- Best New Actress - Rei Dan

2007 Cinemanila International Film Festival

- Nomination - International Competition - Yōji Yamada

2007 Kinema Junpo Awards

- Best Supporting Actor - Takashi Sasano also for The Hardest Night!!
- Best New Actress - Rei Dan

2007 Mainichi Film Awards

- Best Supporting Actor - Takashi Sasano also for The Hardest Night!!
- Best New Talent - Rei Dan

2007 Nikkan Sports Film Awards

- Yujiro Ishihara Award - Yōji Yamada
- Best Supporting Actor - Takashi Sasano

2007 Shanghai International Film Festival

- Best Music Score - Isao Tomita

== Film festivals ==
- Official Selection Moscow International Film Festival
- Opening Film Panorama Special Berlin International Film Festival
- Official Selection Hawaii International Film Festival

== Home media ==
The film was released on DVD by Funimation in 2008. The release contains both an English Dolby Digital 2.0 audio track and its original Japanese Dolby Digital 5.1 audio track (with English subtitles). In 2010, the film was released on Blu-ray (Region A) by Shochiku exclusively for the Japanese market, containing only a Japanese DTS-HD Master Audio 5.1 audio track and Japanese subtitles.
