= Dreams for Sale (2012 film) =

- Film poster
- Directed by: Miwa Nishikawa
- Written by: Miwa Nishikawa
- Produced by: Kayo Yoshida; Hiroko Matsuda; Kosuke Oshida; Asako Nishikawa; Hiroyuki Fujikado
- Starring: Sadao Abe; Takako Matsu; Teruyuki Kagawa; Tamae Ando; Sawa Suzuki
- Cinematography: Katsumi Yanagishima
- Edited by: Ryūji Miyajima
- Production companies: Asmik Ace; Bandai Visual; Office Shirous; Yomiuri Telecasting Corporation; Bungeishunjū; Dentsu; Eisei Gekijo; PAPADO Music Publishers; Yahoo Japan; Ennet
- Release date: September 12, 2012 (Japan)
- Running time: 137 minutes
- Country: Japan
- Language: Japanese

Dreams for Sale (Japanese: 夢売るふたり, Hepburn: Yume Uru Futari) is a 2012 Japanese comedy film, directed and written by Miwa Nishikawa. The film stars Sadao Abe and Takako Matsu as a husband and wife, in addition to Teruyuki Kagawa, Tamae Ando, Sawa Suzuki, Kana Kurashina, Tae Kimura, Yusuke Iseya, Katsuya Kobayashi, Rena Tanaka, Kyôsuke Yabe, Shōfukutei Tsurube II, Teruyuki Kagawa and Takako Matsu.

== Plotline ==
Kan and Sato, husband and wife who have just bought a restaurant as their lifelong dream, lose it overnight when it is burnt down by accident. Following the loss of their restaurant, the couple take jobs at a high class established eatery to start saving their money again for a new establishment. In a drunken state, Kan spends the night with a woman who happens to have just been paid off as the mistress of a man that dies. The woman feels sorry for Kan after hearing about his story, and gives him the money. The wife, though disturbed by hearing of her husband being unfaithful, is inspired to hatch a plan, through desperation, to pimp out the husband to obtain money to buy a new restaurant. The couple use their new work place, frequented by single women looking for partners, as a base to meet prospective victims. Their first victim is prim and proper Satsuki (Lena Tanaka), who still lives in the family home and is under enormous pressure from the family to marry, but the couple do not stop with her. The film follows the drama of the couple's misadventures and tragedy, as the couple plan to marry the husband off to a series of women, conning a series of lonely, vulnerable and weak women out of their hard earned cash, with a range of sympathy stories, with the wife often befriending the victims by posing as a sister of the husband.

The couple focus on weightlifter, Hitomi (Yuka Ebara), prostitute Kana (Tamae Ando) 31-year-old office lady Satsuki Tanahashi (Rena Tanaka) who lives with her parents, lonely office lady Reiko Mutsushima (Sawa Suzuki) and single mom Takiko Kinoshita (Tae Kimura). However, cracks appear in the plan as the husband starts to fall for some of the victims, and starts to get involved in their lives. He also starts to resents the wife's role in the plan, and the fact she does not care about the women, even though he himself is defrauding them. Though the couple accumulate money and start to put their dream kitchen together, the couple's own relationship starts to unravel due to the pressure. The husband starts to extricate himself from their lives, while sympathetic, he still takes their money. However, while removing himself from most of the victims’ lives, he starts to eventually fall for one victim in particular who has a son who he takes to, and starts to integrate himself into their life. Eventually, one of the women hires an investigator (played by Shōfukutei Tsurube II), who finds and confronts him. The husband's fraud is found out, while the wife flees and the restaurant is finished but never used.

== Cast ==
- Sadao Abe as Kanya Ichizawa
- Takako Matsu as Satoko Ichizawa
- Teruyuki Kagawa
- Tamae Ando
- Sawa Suzuki
- Kana Kurashina
- Tae Kimura
- Yusuke Iseya
- Katsuya Kobayashi
- Rena Tanaka
- Kyōsuke Yabe
- Shōfukutei Tsurube II
