= Dreams for Sale =

Dreams for Sale may refer to:

- "Dreams for Sale" (The Twilight Zone), an episode of the television series The Twilight Zone
- Dreams for Sale (2012 film), a Japanese comedy film
