= Dear Doctor (film) =

- Film poster
- Directed by: Miwa Nishikawa
- Written by: Miwa Nishikawa
- Produced by: Yoshihiro Kato
- Starring: Tsurube Shofukutei; Eita; Kimiko Yo; Haruka Igawa; Teruyuki Kagawa; Kaoru Yachigusa
- Cinematography: Katsumi Yanagishima
- Edited by: Ryūji Miyajima
- Music by: More Rhythm
- Production companies: Bandai Visual; Denner Systems
- Release date: June 27, 2009 (Japan)
- Running time: 127 minutes
- Country: Japan
- Language: Japanese

Dear Doctor (Japanese: ディア・ドクター) is a 2009 Japanese drama film directed by Miwa Nishikawa, starring Tsurube Shofukutei. It won the award for Best Film at the 31st Yokohama Film Festival. It was nominated for Best Film at the 33rd Japan Academy Film Prizes.

== Cast ==
- Tsurube Shofukutei as Dr. Osamu Ino
- Eita as Keisuke Soma
- Kimiko Yo as Akemi Otake
- Haruka Igawa as Ritsuko Torikai
- Teruyuki Kagawa as Masayoshi Saimon
- Yutaka Matsushige as Yukinari Hatano
- Ryo Iwamatsu as Yoshifumi Okayasu
- Takashi Sasano as Tokio Sone
- Kaoru Yachigusa as Kazuko Torikai
- Masaya Takahashi

== Awards and nominations ==
33rd Japan Academy Prize.

- Nominated: Best Film

34th Hochi Film Award.

- Won: Best Director - Miwa Nishikawa
