= Achilles and the Tortoise (disambiguation) =

Achilles and the Tortoise are a pair of characters that appear in Zeno's paradoxes.

Achilles and the Tortoise may also refer to:

- "What the Tortoise Said to Achilles" by Lewis Carroll
- Gödel, Escher, Bach by Douglas Hofstadter
- Achilles and the Tortoise (film), a Japanese film starring Takeshi Kitano
