= The Pearls of the Stone Man =

- Poster

Japanese name
- Kanji: 愛を積むひと
Transcriptions
- Revised Hepburn: Ai o Tsumu Hito
- Directed by: Yūzō Asahara
- Screenplay by: Takuro Fukuda; Yūzō Asahara
- Based on: The Pearls of the Stone Man by Edward Mooney, Jr.
- Produced by: Miyako Araki; Tomoko Fushimi; Takako Komatsu
- Starring: Kōichi Satō; Kanako Higuchi; Keiko Kitagawa
- Edited by: Kazuhide Ishijima
- Music by: Taro Iwashiro
- Production companies: Wowow; KDDI; The Yomiuri Shimbun Holdings; Hokkaido Television Broadcasting; TBS Television
- Distributed by: Asmik Ace Entertainment; Shochiku
- Release date: June 20, 2015 (Japan)
- Running time: 125 minutes
- Country: Japan
- Language: Japanese

The Pearls of the Stone Man (Japanese: 愛を積むひと, Hepburn: Ai o Tsumu Hito) is a 2015 Japanese drama film directed by Yūzō Asahara. It was released on June 20, 2015, in Japan. The film is an adaptation of a novel of the same name written by Edward Mooney, Jr., originally published by Sourcebooks (Naperville, Illinois). The Japanese translation is entitled Ishi o Tsumu Hito (石を積むひと), published by Shogakukan.

== Plot ==
Atsushi (Kōichi Satō) and Ryoko (Kanako Higuchi) are a married older couple. After retiring and selling their business, they decide they want to live around nature and move to Biei in Hokkaido. Atsushi isn't sure what to do with his free time, so Ryoko asks him to build a stone wall around their house. Atsushi begrudgingly agrees to do so. Soon after, Ryoko dies. In the midst of his loss, Atsushi grows closer to his estranged daughter, Satoko (Keiko Kitagawa). Atsushi continues building the stone wall, while discovering notes Ryoko left around their house. Through these things, Atsushi discovers a new purpose in his life.

== Cast ==
- Kōichi Satō
- Kanako Higuchi
- Keiko Kitagawa
- Shūhei Nomura
- Hana Sugisaki
- Hiroyuki Morisaki
- Kenta Satoi
- Yoshinori Okada
- Yō Yoshida
- Akira Emoto

== Reception ==
Hana Sugisaki won the award for Best Newcomer at the 37th Yokohama Film Festival for The Pearls of the Stone Man and Pieta in the Toilet.

Kanako Higuchi won the Best Actress award at the 40th annual Brussels International Film Festival for The Pearls of the Stone Man.
