= Eri Tokunaga (actress) =

Japanese actress

- 徳永えり
- Born: May 9, 1988 (age 37); Suita, Osaka Prefecture, Japan
- Occupation: Actress
- Years active: 2004–present
- Employer: Flamme (agency)
- Children: 1
- Website: Profile at Flammme

Eri Tokunaga (徳永えり; born May 9, 1988) is a Japanese actress.

== Filmography ==
=== Film ===
- Hula Girls (2006), Sanae Kimura
- Achilles and the Tortoise (2008), Mari Kuramochi
- Haru's Journey (2010), Haru Nakai
- Hanamizuki (2010), Minami Nakamura
- Arakawa Under the Bridge (2012), Stella
- Tsukigime Otoko Tomodachi (2018)
- Giwaku to Dance (2019)
- Rolling Marbles (2019)
- My Favorite Girl (2020)
- Rock 'n' roll Strip (2020)
- Will I Be Single Forever? (2021), Ayaka
- The Confidence Man JP: Episode of the Hero (2022)
- Popran (2022)
- Everything Will Be Owlright! (2022)
- Kumo to Saru no Kazoku (2023), Kumo
- (Ab)normal Desire (2023), Saori Nasu
- Dear Family (2024), Reiko Yanagi
- The 35-Year Promise (2025), Hiromi

=== Television ===
- Arakawa Under the Bridge (2011), Stella
- Doctor Ume (2012), Yayoi Sawada
- Amachan (2013), Natsu Amano (in younger days)
- Laugh It Up! (2017), Toki
- Love and Fortune (2018), Wako Taira
- Fruits Takuhaibin (2019)
- Shiroi Kyotō (2019)
- A Day-Off of Kasumi Arimura (2020), Ikuko Hoshi
- Love and Fortune (2018), Wako Taira
- Yell (2020)
- Zenkamono (2021)

== Awards ==
- 65th Mainichi Film Awards — Sponichi Grand Prix Newcomer Award — for Haru's Journey (春との旅)
- 20th Japanese Film Critics Awards — Best New Actress (Kazuko Komori Award) — for Haru's Journey
