= Shara (film) =

2003 film

- Directed by: Naomi Kawase
- Written by: Naomi Kawase
- Produced by: Yoshiya Nagasawa
- Starring: Kōhei Fukunaga
- Cinematography: Yutaka Yamasaki
- Edited by: Shotaru Anraku
- Release dates: 24 May 2003 (Cannes); 21 June 2003 (Japan)
- Running time: 100 minutes
- Country: Japan
- Language: Japanese

Shara (Japanese: 沙羅双樹, translit. Sharasōju), is a 2003 Japanese drama film directed by Naomi Kawase. It was entered into the 2003 Cannes Film Festival.

== Cast ==
- Kōhei Fukunaga as Shun
- Yuka Hyōdō as Yu
- Naomi Kawase as Reiko
- Katsuhisa Namase as Taku
- Kanako Higuchi as Shouko
