= Gerd Kaminski =

Austrian legal scholar (1942–2022)

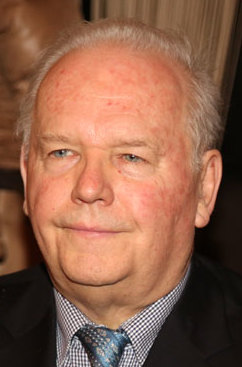
Kaminski in 2014

Gerd Kaminski (14 December 1942 – 7 August 2022) was an Austrian legal scholar and an expert in Chinese affairs.

He studied law and the Chinese language at the University of Vienna. He has been the head of the Austro-Chinese society since 1971. He has been head of the Boltzmann Institute for Chinese and Southeast Asian Research in Vienna since his habilitation in 1978. Additionally he held several guest professorships, amongst others at the State University of New York and at the Peking University. Furthermore, he was a Chinese affairs consultant to the Austrian Foreign Ministry. One of his main focuses in his studies was the conception of Chinese law. He has travelled to Asia more than 70 times und wrote more than 35 books.

Kaminski died on 7 August 2022, at the age of 79.

== Awards ==
- 2001: Grand Decoration of Honour in Gold for Services to the Province of Vienna
- 2003: PaN Personality Prize
- 2013: John Rabe Award

== Select works ==
=== As author ===
- “Bewaffnete Neutralität.“ Basteiverlag, Vienna 1971
- „Die Haltung der Volksrepublik China zum völkerrechtlichen Gebietserwerb demonstriert an den Fällen der Insel Zhenbao (Damanski) und der Diaoyu-Inseln (Senkaku-Inseln).“ Austrian China Research Institution, Vienna 1975
- „Von Österreichern und Chinesen.“ Europa-Verlag, Vienna 1980, ISBN 3-203-50744-7 (together with Else Unterrieder)
- „Der Zauber des bunten Schattens. Chinesisches Schattenspiel einst und jetzt.“ Carinthia, Carinthia 1988, ISBN 3-85378-314-7 (together with Else Unterrieder)
- „Verheiratet mit China. Die unglaubliche Geschichte einer Österreicherin in China.“ Löcker Verlag, Vienna 1997, ISBN 3-85409-288-1
- „Der Boxeraufstand. Entlarvter Mythos.“ Löcker Verlag, Vienna 2000, ISBN 3-85409-325-X
- „Hilf Himmel. Götter und Heilige in China und Europa.“ Austrian museum for folklore, Vienna 2002, ISBN 3-900359-98-9 (together with Franz Grieshofer)
- “Pestarzt in China. Das abenteuerliche Leben des Dr. Heinrich Jettmar.“ Löcker Verlag, Vienna 2010, ISBN 978-3-85409-541-5

=== As editor ===
- „Neutralität in Europa und Südostasien.“ „Wehling-Verlag“, Bonn 1979, ISBN 3-88437-010-3
- „Pandabären statt Parolen. Chinesische Zeitgeschichte in Zeugnissen chinesischer Kindermalerei.“ Europa Verlag, Vienna 1986; ISBN 3-203-50961-X
- „Aodili – Österreich-China. Geschichte einer 300-jährigen Beziehung. Katalog zur Ausstellung in Krems.“ ÖCGF, Vienna 1996, ISBN 3-9500567-0-X (together with Barbara Kreissl)
- Jakob Rosenfeld: „Ich kannte sie alle, Das Tagebuch des chinesischen Generals Jakob Rosenfeld“. Löcker Verlag, Vienna 2002, ISBN 3-85409-363-2
