= Tokyo.sora =

- Directed by: Hiroshi Ishikawa
- Starring: Yuka Itaya; Haruka Igawa; Ayano Nakamura
- Music by: Yoko Kanno
- Release date: 2002
- Running time: 127 minutes
- Country: Japan
- Language: Japanese

Tokyo.sora is a 2002 Japanese drama film directed by Hiroshi Ishikawa.

== Cast ==
- Yuka Itaya
- Haruka Igawa
- Ayano Nakamura
