= John Rabe Communication Centre =

- John Rabe Kommunikationszentrum
- Established: 2002
- Location: Heidelberg, Baden-Württemberg, Germany
- Type: Museum
- Founders: Thomas Rabe; Annette Maleika

The John Rabe Communication Centre is an information centre and museum in Heidelberg, which was founded by Thomas Rabe with the ambition of the documentation of the life of John Rabe. With the help of the diaries of John Rabe it will set a base for the communication of international understanding, particularly between China and Japan.

== Background ==
The information centre and museum was founded in 2002 in Heidelberg, Baden-Württemberg, Germany by Thomas Rabe and his wife Annette Maleika.

In 1937 in Nanjing, John Rabe saved the lives of 250,000 Chinese people of the civilian population from an attack of the imperial Japanese army.

== Ambition ==
The museum will document the events of Nanjing, especially the experiences of John Rabe. The institution serves various peace projects as a stage.

== John Rabe Award ==
Since 2009 the John Rabe Communication Centre annually awards the Peace Prize of John Rabe (John Rabe Award) to people who have worked in a special way on their own history, for international understanding and peace in the relationship with China. The first winner was the Japanese actor Teruyuki Kagawa: "The actor will be honoured, for having demonstrated the courage and the civil courage, for playing the role of HIH-Prince Asaka as a Japanese actor in the 2009 film John Rabe. This showed that the recognition of historical truth to the peoples of China and Japan is more important than ever."

The John Rabe Award 2010 was awarded at 8 November 2010 in the Chinese Culture Centre Berlin to the former director of the John Rabe House in Nanjing, Tang Daoluan as well as the Austrian Holocaust Memorial Service-founder Andreas Maislinger. As in 2009 the Award was courtesy of the Austrian company Swarovski.

Recipients

- 2009 Teruyuki Kagawa
- 2010 Tang Daoluan and Andreas Maislinger
- 2013 Richard Trappl (University of Vienna) and Gerd Kaminski (Institute for China and Southeast Asia research)
