= The Long Excuse =

- Film poster
- Directed by: Miwa Nishikawa
- Screenplay by: Miwa Nishikawa
- Based on: The Long Excuse (novel) by Miwa Nishikawa
- Produced by: Asako Nishikawa; Akihiko Yose; Tetsuo Ota; Shuichi Nagasawa; Kiyoto Matsui; Takashi Iwamura
- Starring: Masahiro Motoki; Pistol Takehara; Kenshin Fujita; Tamaki Shiratori; Keiko Horiuchi; Sosuke Ikematsu; Haru Kuroki; Maho Yamada; Eri Fukatsu
- Cinematography: Yutaka Yamazaki
- Edited by: Ryūji Miyajima
- Production company: Aoi Pro
- Distributed by: Asmik Ace
- Release date: October 14, 2016 (Japan)
- Running time: 124 minutes
- Country: Japan
- Language: Japanese

The Long Excuse (Japanese: 永い言い訳) is a 2016 Japanese drama film directed by Miwa Nishikawa and based on her novel of the same name, starring Masahiro Motoki. It depicts the well-being and uncertainty of relationships through how people who suddenly lose their families restore their lives.

== Plot ==
Sachio (Masahiro Motoki) is a noted celebrity writer from the country, who has snobbishly dismissed his background and become somewhat arrogant. He has largely fallen out of love with his wife Natsuko (Eri Fukatsu), a hairdresser. When she dies in a bus crash, he is in bed with his mistress. Despite this, he feels no guilt, which disgusts his mistress, who, already racked with guilt, leaves him.

Sachio's wife was travelling on the bus with her friend Yuki (Keiko Horiuchi), who also died in the crash. He is contacted by her husband Yoichi Omiya, a truck driver who, with his wife's death, has been left to look after two small children and is not coping. Sachio offers to help, and assists with the raising of the children. When doing it, he ponders his own lack of grief for his wife, and realises that he is dealing with his own guilt by looking after the children. Sachio is forced to reevaluate his own life, including why he didn't have children of his own.

Yoichi too finds that he had become somewhat detached from his children. When Yoichi finds a new partner, Sachio has to leave the children. He ends up writing a new book about the experience, and plays an unexpected role in the children's lives, eventually finding some closure for the loss of his wife.

== Cast ==
- Masahiro Motoki as Sachio Kinugasa
- Eri Fukatsu as Natsuko Kinugasa
- Pistol Takehara as Yoichi Omiya
- Kenshin Fujita
- Tamaki Shiratori
- Keiko Horiuchi
- Sosuke Ikematsu
- Haru Kuroki
- Maho Yamada
- Izumi Matsuoka
- Shigeyuki Totsugi
- Hideto Iwai

== Awards ==
Year	Award ceremony	Category	Recipients	Result
2016	41st Hochi Film Award	Best Picture	The Long Excuse	Nominated
2016	41st Hochi Film Award	Best Director	Miwa Nishikawa	Nominated
2016	41st Hochi Film Award	Best Actor	Masahiro Motoki	Nominated
2016	41st Hochi Film Award	Best Supporting Actor	Pistol Takehara	Nominated
2016	41st Hochi Film Award	Best Supporting Actor	Sosuke Ikematsu	Nominated
2016	29th Nikkan Sports Film Award	Best Film	The Long Excuse	Nominated
2016	29th Nikkan Sports Film Award	Best Director	Miwa Nishikawa	Nominated
2016	29th Nikkan Sports Film Award	Best Actor	Masahiro Motoki	Nominated
2016	29th Nikkan Sports Film Award	Best Supporting Actor	Pistol Takehara	Nominated
2016	29th Nikkan Sports Film Award	Best Supporting Actress	Haru Kuroki	Nominated
2017	71st Mainichi Film Awards	Best Film	The Long Excuse	Nominated
2017	71st Mainichi Film Awards	Best Director	Miwa Nishikawa	Won
2017	71st Mainichi Film Awards	Best Actor	Masahiro Motoki	Won
2017	71st Mainichi Film Awards	Best Supporting Actor	Pistol Takehara	Nominated
2017	40th Japan Academy Prize	Best Supporting Actor	Pistol Takehara	Nominated
