= Ayano Nakamura =

Japanese actress

- Born: October 23, 1980 (age 45); Tokyo, Japan

Ayano Nakamura (仲村 綾乃, Nakamura Ayano) was born October 23, 1980, in Japan. She began as child actress in the late 90s. she is mostly known from "Shall We Dance?" and "Blue."

== Film career ==
Ayano made her debut in 1996 in the film "Shall We Dance?" Where she played the daughter of the lead Sugiyama, a businessman who secretly took ballroom dancing classes.

Ayano didn't return to the film industry until 2001 where she was part of two films, one was a cameo in the horror thriller "Suicide Club" and as the support role as Chika Watanbe in "Blue". "Suicide Club" may have been filmed before "Shall We Dance?" In "Blue" she looks older. "Blue" is a lesbian relationship biography film, and Ayanos role Chika is a straight woman who tries to help her friend in the straight world.

In 2002 Ayano did her final film role in "Tokyo.Sora" or in English "Tokyo.Sky" where she played one of the six girls who try to make a breakthrough in Tokyo, but underneath the sky it's more complicated to make a dream come true. Even though the film did well in The Berlinale film festival and Cannes film festival 2002, she hasn't been seen on cinema since then.

She was also part of a web series in 2005.
