= Mt. Tsurugidake =

- DVD cover
- Directed by: Daisaku Kimura
- Screenplay by: Daisaku Kimura; Toshimasa Miyamura; Atsuo Kikuchi
- Story by: Jirō Nitta (novel)
- Starring: Tadanobu Asano; Teruyuki Kagawa; Ryuhei Matsuda; Aoi Miyazaki; Toru Nakamura; Yukiyoshi Ozawa; Hisashi Igawa; Jun Kunimura; Isao Natsuyagi; Kōji Yakusho
- Cinematography: Daisaku Kimura
- Edited by: Keiichi Itagaki
- Music by: Shin'ichirō Ikebe
- Distributed by: Toei Company
- Release date: June 20, 2009 (Japan)
- Running time: 139 minutes
- Country: Japan
- Language: Japanese

Mt. Tsurugidake (Japanese: 劒岳 点の記, Hepburn: Tsurugidake: Ten no Ki), also known as The Summit: A Chronicle of Stones to Serenity, is a 2009 Japanese drama film directed by Daisaku Kimura.

== Cast ==
- Tadanobu Asano as Shibasaki
- Teruyuki Kagawa as Uji
- Ryuhei Matsuda as Ikuta
- Yukijirō Hotaru as Kinsaku Iwamoto
- Takashi Sasano as Noriaki Okubo
- Toru Nakamura as Usui Kojima
- Aoi Miyazaki as Hatsuyo Shibazaki
- Renji Ishibashi as Sakichi Ogata
- Hirofumi Arai as Akira Ushiyam3a
- Hisashi Igawa as Nagamaru Saeki
- Kōji Yakusho as Furuta

== Awards ==
33rd Japan Academy Prize

- Won: Best Director - Daisaku Kimura
- Won: Best Supporting Actor - Teruyuki Kagawa
- Nominated: Best Film
- Nominated: Best Actor - Tadanobu Asano
