= Shuhei Fujisawa =

Japanese author (1927–1997)

Shuhei Fujisawa (藤沢 周平, Fujisawa Shūhei) (26 December 1927 – 26 January 1997) was a Japanese author, whose real name was Tomeji Kosuge. (小菅留治). Over fifty of his books were published through the course of his lifetime, including both full-length novels and short story anthologies. The focus of his writing was historical fiction. Before he became an author, he had been a business journalist and before that a high school teacher.

== Published works ==
Over 23 million of his paperbacks have been printed. His work has been adapted for both television and film. Five recent full-length films have been based on his work. Three of them directed by Yoji Yamada are

- The Twilight Samurai (2002)
- The Hidden Blade (2004)
- Love and Honor (2006).

In addition, Hana no Ato (2010) was turned into a movie and directed by Kenji Nakanishi. Kikyō was also adapted into a movie (2019).

=== Historical setting ===
The Bamboo Sword and Other Samurai Tales, a collection of eight short stories, is a work of historical fiction. The stories are set in Edo period Japan (1603-1867) and depict the lives of people from all walks of life, but revolve mainly around samurai characters. The Edo Period (1603-1867) was a 264 year period of relative peace in Japanese history. This historical period was full of political upheaval and intrigue, rivalry and betrayals. During this time, the samurai struggled to retain their sense of pride and meaning in life as they attempted to settle into mundane jobs and family life. This struggle can be seen throughout The Bamboo Sword and Other Samurai Tales and other works by Fujisawa, who always highlighted the humanity of his characters in his stories. His stories, thus, offer the reader a means to understand Japanese history and culture in a more real sense and through unflowery prose.

== Awards ==
In 1973, Fujisawa received the 69th Naoki Prize (1973上) for Ansatsu no Nenrin (Annals of Assassination). He would go on to win six further literary awards, among them the Asahi Prize in 1994.

The Twilight Samurai (2002), which was in part based on the title story, The Bamboo Sword and Other Samurai Tales, won the 2003 Japanese Academy Awards. It was also nominated for an Oscar in the Best Foreign Language Film category.

== Sources ==
- https://web.archive.org/web/20080101070758/http://www.shochikufilms.com/film/detail.php?product_code=269
