= Thomas Rabe =

German professor for gynaecology and obstetrics

Thomas N. Rabe
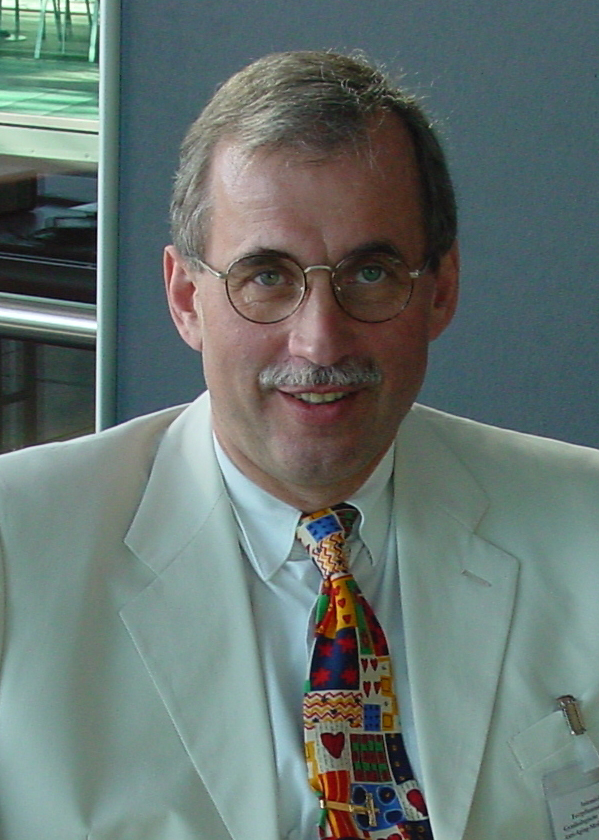
- Rabe in 2008
- Born: Thomas Nicolai Rabe; 18 February 1951 (age 75); Heidelberg, Baden-Württemberg, Germany
- Occupations: gynaecologist, lecturer
- Known for: Grandson of John Rabe
- Spouse: Annette Maleika
- Children: 3
- Parents: Otto Rabe (father); Else Ludwig (mother)
- Relatives: John Rabe (grandfather); Dora Rabe (grandmother)
- Medical career
- Field: Medicine
- Institutions: University Hospital Heidelberg; Heidelberg University School of Medicine
- Sub-specialties: gynaecology obstetrics

Thomas Nicolai Rabe (born 18 February 1951) is a German professor for gynaecology and obstetrics at the University Hospital Heidelberg. He is author of several scientific publications and reference books.

== Biography ==
Rabe earned his medical degree in Heidelberg. Since 1983 he has been a specialist in gynaecology and obstetrics. His research was focused on the steroid metabolism of the placenta, new methods of family planning, hormone therapy, and the development of computer-based teaching systems. After his professorship for gynaecology and obstetrics in 1991, he became attending physician at the university hospital and at the department for gynaecology, endocrinology, and fertility issues.

Between 1995 and 1999 Rabe was responsible for the scientific activities of the Collaborating Centres WHO (Genf) at the university's hospital for women. He also belongs to the editorial staff of several national and international trade journals.

Rabe is the son of Otto Rabe and his wife Else (née Ludwig) Rabe, therefore he is the grandson of John Rabe and advocates coming to terms with the history between China and Japan. Rabe and his wife Annette Maleika-Rabe founded the John Rabe Communication Centre in 2002, which is dedicated to continue his grandfather John Rabe's vision of peace. They have three children; two daughters Leonie and Antonia, and a son Maximilian who works alongside him at the John Rabe Communication Center to continue their family's legacy of Sino-German friendship.

In addition to his international contacts with various clinics and hospitals, Rabe is also member of the International Council at the Austrian Service Abroad.

== Awards ==
- 1996: honorary degree of the Semmelweis University, Budapest, Hungary;
- 1997: honorary degree of the Victor Babeș University of Medicine and Pharmacy, Timișoara, Romania;
- 1999: honorary degree, University Women's’ Hospital, Cluj-Napoca, Romania;
- 2002: honorary title at the Carol Davila University of Medicine and Pharmacy in Bucharest, Romania.
- 2015: honorary citizen of the City of Nanjing, China
- 2015: medal from President of China Xi Jinping as Grandson of John Rabe (2 September 2015)

== Publications (selection) ==
- Rabe T, Strowitzki T, Diedrich K (eds.) (2000). Manual on Assisted Reproduction. 2nd updated Edition. Springer Verlag Berlin, Heidelberg, New York.
- Rabe T, Runnebaum, Benno (1999) Fertility control - update and trends. Springer, Heidelberg. ISBN 3-540-64763-5 ISBN 978-3-540-64763-8
- Rabe T, Runnebaum B (eds) (1998). Fertility Control Springer, Heidelberg.
- Rabe T, Diedrich K, Runnebaum B (Eds) (1997). Assisted Reproduction - a manual. Springer-Verlag, Heidelberg ISBN 3-540-61134-7 ISBN 978-3-540-61134-9
- Runnebaum B, Rabe T, Kiesel L (1985). Future aspects in contraception: Part 1: Male contraception. MTP Press Limited, Falcon House, Lancaster, England
- Runnebaum B, Rabe T, Kiesel L (Eds.) (1991). Female contraception and male fertility regulation. Parthenon Publishing Group, Casterton Hall, Carnforth, Lancaster, England ISBN 1-85070-334-5 ISBN 978-1-85070-334-1
