= Creepy (film) =

2016 Japanese thriller film

- Poster
- Japanese: クリーピー 偽りの隣人
- Directed by: Kiyoshi Kurosawa
- Screenplay by: Kiyoshi Kurosawa; Chihiro Ikeda
- Based on: Kurīpī by Yutaka Maekawa
- Starring: Hidetoshi Nishijima; Yūko Takeuchi; Teruyuki Kagawa; Haruna Kawaguchi; Masahiro Higashide
- Cinematography: Akiko Ashizawa
- Edited by: Koichi Takahashi
- Music by: Yuri Habuka
- Production companies: Shochiku; Asmik Ace Entertainment
- Distributed by: Shochiku
- Release dates: 13 February 2016 (Berlinale); 18 June 2016 (Japan)
- Running time: 130 minutes
- Country: Japan
- Language: Japanese
- Box office: $4,721,487

Creepy (Japanese: クリーピー 偽りの隣人, Hepburn: Kurīpī: Itsuwari no Rinjin; lit. Creepy, False Neighbours) is a 2016 Japanese psychological thriller film directed by Kiyoshi Kurosawa, starring Hidetoshi Nishijima, Yūko Takeuchi, Teruyuki Kagawa, Haruna Kawaguchi, and Masahiro Higashide. Based on the 2012 novel by Yutaka Maekawa, it is about a married couple uncovering the secrets of their new, mysterious neighbor. The film had its world premiere at the 66th Berlin International Film Festival on 13 February 2016. It was released in Japan on 18 June 2016.

== Plot ==
Having resigned as a profiler following an injury, Koichi Takakura and his wife Yasuko move to a place closer to his new job as a university lecturer in criminal psychology. In an effort to be friendly, Yasuko introduces herself to their two neighbors. One of them is Mrs. Tanaka and her bed-ridden mother, who coldly reject any kind of friendship with the Takakuras. Yasuko rings the doorbell at the house of their other neighbor, who lives in-between the Takakuras and Tanakas, but there is no answer. When Yasuko goes again to leave a bag of chocolates at the middle neighbor's gate, he appears and identifies himself as Masayuki Nishino. Their initial encounter gives Yasuko a creepy impression of Nishino, as he acts strangely whenever he's around her.

While at work, Koichi becomes interested in a cold case involving the disappearance of three members of a family leaving only an unreliable witness, Saki Honda. A former police colleague of Koichi's named Nogami asks him to help investigate. While visiting the crime scene, Koichi and Nogami try to talk to Saki, but she refuses as she doesn't quite remember the events leading up to her family's disappearance. Back at home, Yasuko runs into Nishino again and he tells her he lives with his daughter, Mio, and his wife; but after saying she looks forward to meeting her, Nishino rudely dismisses her. When walking home, Koichi is confronted by Nishino who says that Yasuko is a burden. Both Koichi and Yasuko have uneasy feelings about Nishino, but they relent when he becomes friendlier and more open with his life.

At the university, Koichi and Nogami interview Saki, who says that before her family vanished, they acted in extremely bizarre ways that were much different than what they normally did. She also remembers seeing a man staring at her from the house of the family's neighbor, Mr. Mizuta. When investigating the Mizuta house, Nogami discovers five decomposing bodies wrapped in sealed plastic bags. Yasuko, when looking for their dog, Max, encounters Nishino, who flirts with her. Later, Koichi is approached by Mio, who says that Nishino is not her father, but a complete stranger. As he attempts to ask her questions, Nishino and Yasuko return home together and she runs away. Yasuko begins to act erratically, suffering from periods of sickness and emotional outbursts. As a result, Koichi grows more suspicious of Nishino, who asks Nogami to look into him. Nogami visits Nishino's house, and is invited inside. but Nogami goes down a corridor and opens a large metal door. Right as Koichi comes home, the Tanaka house explodes, and while trying to help, he notices Nishino casually watching television.

When police investigate, Koichi is told by an older lieutenant, Tanimoto, that there were three bodies in the wreckage: Tanaka, her mother, and Nogami. Puzzled, Koichi visits Saki and attempts to show her a photograph of Nishino, but she doesn't remember him. It is revealed that Nishino is an impostor; he controls Mio and her mother after apparently killing Mio's actual father and having her dispose of him in the same way as the corpses in the Mizuka house. Mio's mother is kept under control by an injection of special tranquilizers, but after Mio purposefully gives her an under-dose, the mother attacks Nishino, only to be subdued. Nishino then shoots the mother with Nogami's gun in front of Mio. Nishino then brings Yasuko down into his chamber and shows her the mother's body and forces her to help Mio dispose of the body. Koichi comes home and is startled when Mio barges in. He asks her where Yasuko is, but is interrupted by Nishino who has Yasuko's house key. Koichi assaults Nishino, but the police arrive and detain Koichi.

Tanimoto talks to Koichi and has Nishino brought to the police station. They discover Nishino has left and they both drive to Nishino's house. Tanimoto discovers the chamber, but is incapacitated by Nishino. Koichi goes into the chamber and finds Yasuko and Tanimoto, but is confronted by Nishino holding Yasuko at gunpoint. Nishino reveals to Koichi that he has effectively brainwashed Yasuko and Mio through drugs, and assures Koichi that Yasuko is his. Koichi realizes that Nishino moves from family to family, brainwashing them and eventually makes them kill each other. He manages to talk to Yasuko and berates Nishino for his crimes, but Koichi is suddenly injected by Yasuko, and they depart with Nishino, Mio, and Max.

The five of them arrive at an abandoned building, where Nishino scouts for another "home." Deeming Max unnecessary baggage, Nishino brings the drugged Koichi out from the car and urges him to kill Max. Koichi tells Nishino that "this is where you fall," and quickly turns and shoots Nishino. Free of his brainwashing, Mio celebrates with Max, and Yasuko, understanding what she and Koichi went through, breaks down in his arms.

== Cast ==
- Hidetoshi Nishijima as Koichi Takakura
- Yūko Takeuchi as Yasuko Takakura
- Teruyuki Kagawa as Nishino
- Haruna Kawaguchi as Saki Honda
- Masahiro Higashide as Nogami
- Ryōko Fujino as Mio
- Toru Baba as Matsuoka
- Takashi Sasano as Tanimoto
- Masahiro Toda as Okawa

== Production ==
The filming began on 1 August 2015, and ended on 4 September 2015.

== Release ==
The film had its world premiere at the 66th Berlin International Film Festival on 13 February 2016. It was released in Japan on 18 June 2016.

== Reception ==
On review aggregator website Rotten Tomatoes, the film holds an approval rating of 91%, based on 47 reviews, and an average rating of 7.16/10. The website's critical consensus reads, "Creepy lives up to its title with a suspenseful and thoroughly unsettling - not to mention well-acted - blend of crime procedural and domestic drama." On Metacritic, the film has received a weighted average score of 76 out of 100, based on 13 critics, indicating "generally favorable reviews".

Deborah Young of The Hollywood Reporter wrote that with Creepy, "Kiyoshi Kurosawa returns from auteurist chores to the classic horror that made him a cult name." The New York Times' critic Manohla Dargis praised the film, writing, "Creepy certainly works — looks and feels — like a horror movie, but it also has the conundrums of a detective story, the emotional currents of a domestic drama and the quickening pulse of a psychological thriller, a combination that creates a kind of destabilization." Rob Staeger of The Village Voice also praised the film and singled out Teruyuki Kagawa's performance, writing: "The performances are compelling all around, but Kagawa stands out: His Nishino, somehow as cowardly as he is sinister, recalls the oily nervousness of Peter Lorre." Chuck Bowen of Slant Magazine gave the film 3 out of 4 stars, commenting that "Creepy is a masterful work of suspense, but it ultimately remains an exercise; the film doesn't quite make the leap into the gloriously irrational realm of the empathetic and transcendent."
