= Tora-san's Island Encounter =

- Theatrical poster
- Directed by: Yoji Yamada
- Written by: Yoji Yamada; Yoshitaka Asama
- Starring: Kiyoshi Atsumi; Komaki Kurihara
- Cinematography: Tetsuo Takaba
- Edited by: Iwao Ishii
- Music by: Naozumi Yamamoto
- Distributed by: Shochiku
- Release date: December 28, 1985
- Running time: 105 minutes
- Country: Japan
- Language: Japanese

Tora-san's Island Encounter (男はつらいよ 柴又より愛をこめて, Otoko wa Tsurai yo: Shibamata yori Ai o Komete) aka Torasan, From Shibamata with Love is a 1985 Japanese comedy film directed by Yoji Yamada. It stars Kiyoshi Atsumi as Torajirō Kuruma (Tora-san), and Komaki Kurihara as his love interest or "Madonna". Tora-san's Island Encounter is the thirty-sixth entry in the popular, long-running Otoko wa Tsurai yo series.

== Synopsis ==
Tora-san's family's neighbor, Akemi, who had been married in Marriage Counselor Tora-san (1984), runs away from her husband, who is only interested in work. Tora-san follows her to Shikinejima, and attempts to bring her back to her home. In doing so he encounters a school-reunion group who are traveling to meet their elementary school teacher, which is a reference to the film Twenty-Four Eyes by Keisuke Kinoshita. Tora-san joins them and falls in love with the teacher.

== Cast ==
- Kiyoshi Atsumi as Torajirō
- Chieko Baisho as Sakura
- Komaki Kurihara as Machiko
- Jun Miho as Akemi
- Shimojo Masami as Kuruma Tatsuzō
- Chieko Misaki as Tsune Kuruma (Torajiro's aunt)
- Gin Maeda as Hiroshi Suwa
- Hidetaka Yoshioka as Mitsuo Suwa
- Hisao Dazai as Boss (Umetarō Katsura)
- Gajirō Satō as Genkō

== Critical appraisal ==
Nominations for Tora-san's Island Encounter at the Japan Academy Prize included Best Actor (Kiyoshi Atsumi), Best Director (Yoji Yamada), Best Music Score (Naozumi Yamamoto), Best Sound (Isao Suzuki and Takashi Matsumoto), Best Supporting Actress (Jun Miho), and Best Art Direction (Mitsuo Degawa). Stuart Galbraith IV judges the film an entertaining, but not outstanding entry in the Otoko wa Tsurai yo series, especially if one understands the references to Kinoshita's Twenty-Four Eyes. Kevin Thomas of the Los Angeles Times called it "one of the best" stating in his 1986 review that "Yamada achieves inTora's Island Adventure evocative moments the equal of those all-too-rare features he gets to make outside his 17-year-old series." The German-language site molodezhnaja gives Tora-san's Island Encounter four out of five stars, naming it one of the highlights of the series.

== Availability ==
Tora-san's Island Encounter was released theatrically on December 28, 1985. In Japan, the film was released on videotape in 1987 and 1996, and in DVD format in 1998, 2005 and 2008.

== Bibliography ==
=== English ===
- "OTOKO WA TSURAIYO -SHIBAMATA YORI AI O KOMETE". Complete Index to World Film.
- Otoko wa tsurai yo: Shibamata yori ai wo komete (1985) at IMDb
- Galbraith IV, Stuart (2008-05-01). "Tora-san 36: Tora-san's Island Encounter (Region 3)". DVD Talk.

=== German ===
- "Tora-San's Island Encounter" (in German). www.molodezhnaja.ch.

=== Japanese ===
- 男はつらいよ 柴又より愛をこめて (1985) (in Japanese). allcinema.net.
- "男はつらいよ 柴又より愛をこめて". Japanese Cinema Database (Agency for Cultural Affairs). Archived from the original on 2012-03-11.
- 男はつらいよ 柴又より愛をこめて (in Japanese). Japanese Movie Database.
- 男はつらいよ 柴又より愛をこめて (in Japanese). Kinema Junpo. Archived from the original on 2012-06-29.
