= Petal Dance =

2013 film by Hiroshi Ishikawa

- Directed by: Hiroshi Ishikawa
- Written by: Hiroshi Ishikawa
- Starring: Aoi Miyazaki; Shiori Kutsuna; Sakura Ando; Kazue Fukiishi
- Cinematography: Yoichi Nagano
- Edited by: Hiroshi Ishikawa
- Music by: Yoko Kanno
- Distributed by: Bitters End
- Release date: April 20, 2013
- Running time: 90 minutes
- Country: Japan
- Language: Japanese

Petal Dance (ペタル ダンス, Petaru Dansu) is a 2013 Japanese film directed by Hiroshi Ishikawa.

== Synopsis ==
The film concerns a trip taken by two women, Jinko and Motoko, and their driver, Haraki, to see Miki, an old friend now living in a psychiatric hospital after attempting suicide. Jinko and Motoko have not seen Miki in six years, and the trip becomes a meditation on their own lives and sorrows, as well as reconciliation for their guilt of not being able to help her before.

== Cast ==
- Aoi Miyazaki as Jinko
- Shiori Kutsuna as Haraki
- Sakura Ando as Motoko
- Kazue Fukiishi as Miki
- Masanobu Andō as Naoto
- Shunsuke Kazama as Kawada
- Mariko Gotō as Senpai
- Hanae Kan as Kyoko

== Reception ==
On Film Business Asia, Derek Elley gave the film a 4 out of 10, saying that the "existential road drama of four young women offers diminishing results." A review on Japan Times by Mark Schilling gave the film a rating of 3.5 out of 5.
