= Kikyo – The Return =

- 帰郷
- Directed by: Shigemichi Sugita
- Screenplay by: Masahiro Kobayashi; Shigemichi Sugita
- Based on: Kikyō by Shuhei Fujisawa
- Produced by: Tomoyuki Miyagawa
- Starring: Tatsuya Nakadai
- Cinematography: Shoji Ehara
- Music by: Takashi Kako
- Release dates: 15 October 2019 (MIPCOM); 4 November 2019 (Tokyo)
- Running time: 119 minutes
- Country: Japan
- Language: Japanese

Kikyo – The Return (Japanese: 帰郷, Hepburn: Kikyō) is a 2019 Japanese jidaigeki film directed by Shigemichi Sugita and starring Tatsuya Nakadai.

== Premise ==
The film is set during the Edo period, the first half of the 19th century. The lead character, an old gambler who has fallen ill, returns to his hometown after 30 years of traveling and sets out to help a young woman in dire straits.

== Cast ==
- Tatsuya Nakadai as Unokichi, the gambler
  - Kazuki Kitamura as younger Unokichi (in flashbacks)
- Takako Tokiwa as Okumi, the young woman
- Atsuo Nakamura as Boss Kyuzo, who became the yakuza leader in Unokichi's hometown
- Jiro Sato as Eiji
- Naoto Ogata as Okumi's husband Genta
- Isao Hashizume as Saichi
- Ayumi Tanida as Asakichi
- Aki Maeda as Oaki (in flashbacks)
- Misato Tanaka as Otoshi (in flashbacks)
- Yoshiko Mita as Okou (in flashbacks)

== Background and production ==
The film was based on a short story by Shuhei Fujisawa with the same name. It was the first 8K historical drama ever produced by the Jidaigeki Senmon Channel. It was directed by Shigemichi Sugita.

== Release ==
The film premiered worldwide at MIPCOM in Cannes on 15 October 2019. It debuted in Japan at the 32nd Tokyo International Film Festival on 4 November 2019 and was released in theaters in January 2020.

A year later, in January 2021, it was aired in 8K resolution on the NHK BS8K channel.

The film was released on DVD in Japan; a version with English subtitles is also available. A Hindi-dubbed version was released as a 3-part miniseries on the video streaming service MX Player (now Amazon MX Player).
