= What the Snow Brings =

- Kanji: 雪に願うこと
- Directed by: Kichitaro Negishi
- Screenplay by: Masato Kato
- Starring: Yūsuke Iseya; Kōichi Satō; Kyōko Koizumi; Kazue Fukiishi; Teruyuki Kagawa; Mitsuko Kusabue; Tsutomu Yamazaki
- Release dates: October 28, 2005 (Japan, festival); May 20, 2006 (Japan, theatrical)
- Running time: 112 minutes
- Country: Japan
- Language: Japanese

What the Snow Brings (雪に願うこと, Yuki ni Negau Koto) is a 2005 Japanese drama film directed by Kichitaro Negishi and based on a novel by Shō Narumi.

== Synopsis ==
Manabu Yazaki had left his family's home in Hokkaidō years before to go to Tokyo to earn a degree, start a company and get married. Now, divorced and pursued by creditors, he returns to his home and the family he has ignored for so many years. He loses the last of his money on a ban'ei horse race, a local sport where huge draft horses compete while pulling sleighs. Now broke, Manabu finds a job at the stable run by his brother Takeo. There he meets two women, Haruko, who helps Takeo run the stable, and Makie, the jockey who seems to have lost her touch. He also finds Unryu at the stable, the horse that cost him his money at the ban'ei, and who may be heading for the slaughterhouse.

== Cast ==
- Yūsuke Iseya as Manabu Yazaki
- Kōichi Satō as Takeo Yazaki
- Kyōko Koizumi as Haruko Tanaka
- Kazue Fukiishi as Makie Shudo
- Teruyuki Kagawa as Ogasawara
- Kippei Shiina (椎名桔平) as Kurokawa
- Yukiyoshi Ozawa (小澤征悦) as Sutō
- Masahiko Tsugawa as Ozeki
- Denden (でんでん) as Tamotsu Fujimaki
- Hiroshi Yamamoto (山本浩司) as Tetsuo Kato

== Release ==
What the Snow Brings played at the Tokyo International Film Festival in October 2005 and was released theatrically in Japan on May 20, 2006. In September 2007, it had a showing at the 2007 Raindance Film Festival.

== Awards ==
18th Tokyo International Film Festival

- Won: Tokyo Sakura Grand Prix
- Won: Audience Award
- Won: Best Director – Kichitaro Negishi
- Won: Best Actor: – Kōichi Satō

28th Yokohama Film Festival

- Won: Best Supporting Actress – Kazue Fukiishi

31st Hochi Film Awards

- Won: Best Director – Kichitaro Negishi

=== 2006 JRA Award ===
- Won: JRA Equine Cultural Award - Be WILD
