= Su-ki-da =

2005 Japanese romantic drama film

- Theatrical poster
- Directed by: Hiroshi Ishikawa
- Written by: Hiroshi Ishikawa
- Produced by: Hiroshi Ishikawa; Hisashi Tsuchiya
- Starring: Aoi Miyazaki; Hidetoshi Nishijima; Hiromi Nagasaku; Eita
- Cinematography: Hiroshi Ishikawa
- Edited by: Hiroshi Ishikawa
- Music by: Yoko Kanno
- Distributed by: Bitters End, Inc.
- Release dates: September 23, 2005 (New Montreal Film Festival); February 26, 2006 (Japan)
- Running time: 104 minutes
- Country: Japan
- Language: Japanese

Su-ki-da (好きだ) is a 2005 Japanese romantic drama film. The plot centers on two teenagers who deal with tragedy and then have to grow up. It was written and directed by Hiroshi Ishikawa and stars Aoi Miyazaki, Hidetoshi Nishijima, Hiromi Nagasaku, and Eita.

== Plot ==
High school student Yosuke spends most of his free time sitting near a floodgate and playing the same short tune on his acoustic guitar. He is often joined by a girl in his class, Yu. Yu hums Yosuke's tune to her older sister, who is mourning her deceased boyfriend. Yu sets up a few meetings between Yosuke and her sister. While talking with Yosuke after school, Yu kisses him, but Yosuke walks away, leaving Yu devastated. While walking to see Yosuke, Yu's sister is hit by a truck and enters a coma. Yu tells Yosuke that she wants to hear his song when he finishes it.

17 years later, Yosuke is working in music production in Tokyo. He shoos away a man interfering with an intoxicated woman lying in the street and takes her to recover in his apartment. During a break at the studio, a woman plays a few notes from the song Yosuke played in his school days and he realizes she is Yu. They go back to Yosuke's apartment and drink sake. Yu tells him that her sister is still in a coma. She starts to cry, Yosuke comforts her, and they kiss.

Yu and Yosuke visit her sister at the hospital and Yu leaves at the train station. Yosuke looks her up in the phone book and calls to say that he wants to play the finished song for her. On the way to meet her, he is stabbed by the man he shooed from the intoxicated woman. Yosuke lies in the street bleeding while Yu waits for him.

Yu visits Yosuke in the hospital and tells him she loves him. Yosuke replies that he loves her, too.

== Cast ==
- Aoi Miyazaki as Yu (young)
- Hidetoshi Nishijima as Yosuke
- Hiromi Nagasaku as Yu
- Eita as Yosuke (young)
- Sayuri Oyamada as Yu's older sister
- Maho Nonami
- Ryo Kase
- Nao Ōmori

== Production ==
The film was directed by Hiroshi Ishikawa and was his second full-length feature, after the 2003 film Tokyo.Sora. In addition to directing, Ishikawa was also the writer, editor, and cinematographer. Yoko Kanno composed the score, including Yosuke's song that plays throughout most of the film. It was shot in Tokyo, Japan.

The Japanese title Su-ki-da translates to "I love you" in English.

== Release and reception ==
Su-ki-da was premiered at the New Montreal Film Festival on September 23, 2005. It won one award, the Silver Iris for Best Director. The film was released in Japan on February 26, 2006 and was also shown at the Hong Kong International Film Festival on April 8.

Critical reviews were mixed. According to Variety's Eddie Cockrell (who viewed it at the NMFF), the film was filled with "unchecked indulgences." He criticized the director, writing that: "Jump cuts, cryptic silences, shots of various cloud formations and long takes bereft of movement are key weapons in Ishikawa's self-consciously arty arsenal, with little in the way of story or character development to engage viewers; Gus van Sant he's not."

On the other hand, DVDBeaver.com praised the film for its "heartfelt story," "excellent visuals," and "great cast." The reviewer noted its lack of dialogue but also said that "the characters' body language says more than any words could ever express."

The DVD was released in Japan on September 22, 2006, by Big Time Entertainment. It includes English and French subtitles.
