= Hiroshi Ishikawa =

Japanese film director

Hiroshi Ishikawa (石川 寛, born May 18, 1963) is a Japanese film director and writer from Ōdate. He is best known for his 2005 film, Su-ki-da (2005). He won the Silver Iris for Best Director at the New Montreal Film Festival.

== Filmography ==
- Tokyo.sora (2002)
- Su-ki-da (2005)
- Kimi no Yubisaki (Short Film) (2007)
- Petal Dance (2013)
- The Blue We Touch (2027)
