= Marriage Counselor Tora-san =

- Theatrical poster for Marriage Counselor Tora-san (1984)
- Directed by: Yoji Yamada
- Written by: Yoji Yamada; Yoshitaka Asama
- Starring: Kiyoshi Atsumi; Rie Nakahara
- Cinematography: Tetsuo Takaba
- Edited by: Iwao Ishii
- Music by: Naozumi Yamamoto
- Distributed by: Shochiku
- Release date: August 4, 1984
- Running time: 102 minutes
- Country: Japan
- Language: Japanese

Marriage Counselor Tora-san (男はつらいよ 夜霧にむせぶ寅次郎, Otoko wa Tsurai yo: Yogiri ni Musebu Torajirō) is a 1984 Japanese comedy film directed by Yoji Yamada. It stars Kiyoshi Atsumi as Torajirō Kuruma (Tora-san), and Rie Nakahara as his love interest or "Madonna". Marriage Counselor Tora-san is the thirty-third entry in the popular, long-running Otoko wa Tsurai yo series.

== Synopsis ==
In Shibamata, Tokyo, Tora-san's family prepares for a wedding. Meanwhile, the traveling Tora-san meets an old acquaintance in Iwate Province. Tora-san refuses to drink with him, afraid that the acquaintance, now settled and married, will again become attracted to Tora-san's wandering existence. Tora-san becomes attracted to a female barber, but must break off their relationship so that she too can live a secure life. She instead gets into an abusive relationship with a motorcyclist.

== Cast ==
- Kiyoshi Atsumi as Torajirō
- Chieko Baisho as Sakura
- Rie Nakahara as Fūko Kogure
- Tsunehiko Watase as Tony
- Jun Miho as Akemi
- Shimojo Masami as Kuruma Tatsuzō
- Chieko Misaki as Tsune Kuruma (Torajiro's aunt)
- Taisaku Akino
- Gin Maeda as Hiroshi Suwa
- Hidetaka Yoshioka as Mitsuo Suwa
- Hisao Dazai as Boss (Umetarō Katsura)
- Gajirō Satō as Genkō
- Chishū Ryū as Gozen-sama

== Critical appraisal ==
Stuart Galbraith IV writes that Marriage Counselor Tora-san is a better entry in the Otoko wa Tsurai yo series, though it differs considerably from other films in the series, both formally and thematically. Tora-san's wandering life is portrayed harshly, rather than light-heartedly, and his family's stable life is shown in the more positive light. Galbraith concludes, "With its darker tone and atypical structure, Tora-san's Marriage Counselor is like a breath of fresh air following a series of recent, somewhat repetitive entries." The German-language site molodezhnaja gives Marriage Counselor Tora-san three and a half out of five stars.

== Availability ==
Marriage Counselor Tora-san was released theatrically on August 4, 1984. In Japan, the film was released on videotape in 1987 and 1996, and in DVD format in 2005 and 2008.
