= Kanako Higuchi =

Japanese actress

- Born: December 13, 1958 (age 67); Kamo, Niigata, Japan
- Occupation: Actress
- Years active: 1978–present
- Spouse: Shigesato Itoi (1993–)

Kanako Higuchi (樋口 可南子, Higuchi Kanako) (born December 13, 1958) is a Japanese actress. Her credits include film, television, and radio dramas, stage, commercials, and voice roles.

Born in Kamo, Niigata, she played her first lead at age 20 in the television drama Kōrogi-bashi.

Kanako's film credits include Hokusai Manga, Bedtime Eyes, Zatoichi (1989), Casshern, Memories of Tomorrow, and Ashura no Jō Blood Gets In Your Eyes. Among her television roles are Lady Yodo in the 1987 NHK Taiga drama Dokuganryū Masamune and Hanayasha in the 1991 Taiga drama Taiheiki. She has represented the cosmetics firms KOSÉ and Kao.

She won the award for Best Supporting Actress at the 15th Hochi Film Awards for Rōningai.

She married Shigesato Itoi in 1993 and had a dog named Bouillon.

== Filmography ==
=== Films ===
- Edo Porn (Hokusai Manga) (1981)
- Manji (1983)
- Wangan Doro (1984)
- Tora-san, the Go-Between (1985)
- Bedtime Eyes (1987)
- Zatoichi (1989)
- Rōningai (1990)
- Shara (2003)
- Casshern (2004)
- Sharasoyju (2005)
- Ashurajou no Hitomi (2005)
- Memories of Tomorrow (2006)
- The Invitation from Cinema Orion (2007)
- Achilles and the Tortoise (2008)
- The Pearls of the Stone Man (2015)

=== Television ===
- Dokuganryū Masamune (1987) - Yodo-dono
- Taiheiki (1991) - Hanayasha
- Atsuhime (2008) - Oyuki

=== Japanese dub ===
- Doctor Strange (2017) - Ancient One (Tilda Swinton)
- Avengers: Endgame (2019) - Ancient One (Tilda Swinton)

== Honours ==
- Kinuyo Tanaka Award (1991)
