= Yūko Nakamura =

Japanese actress (born 1975)

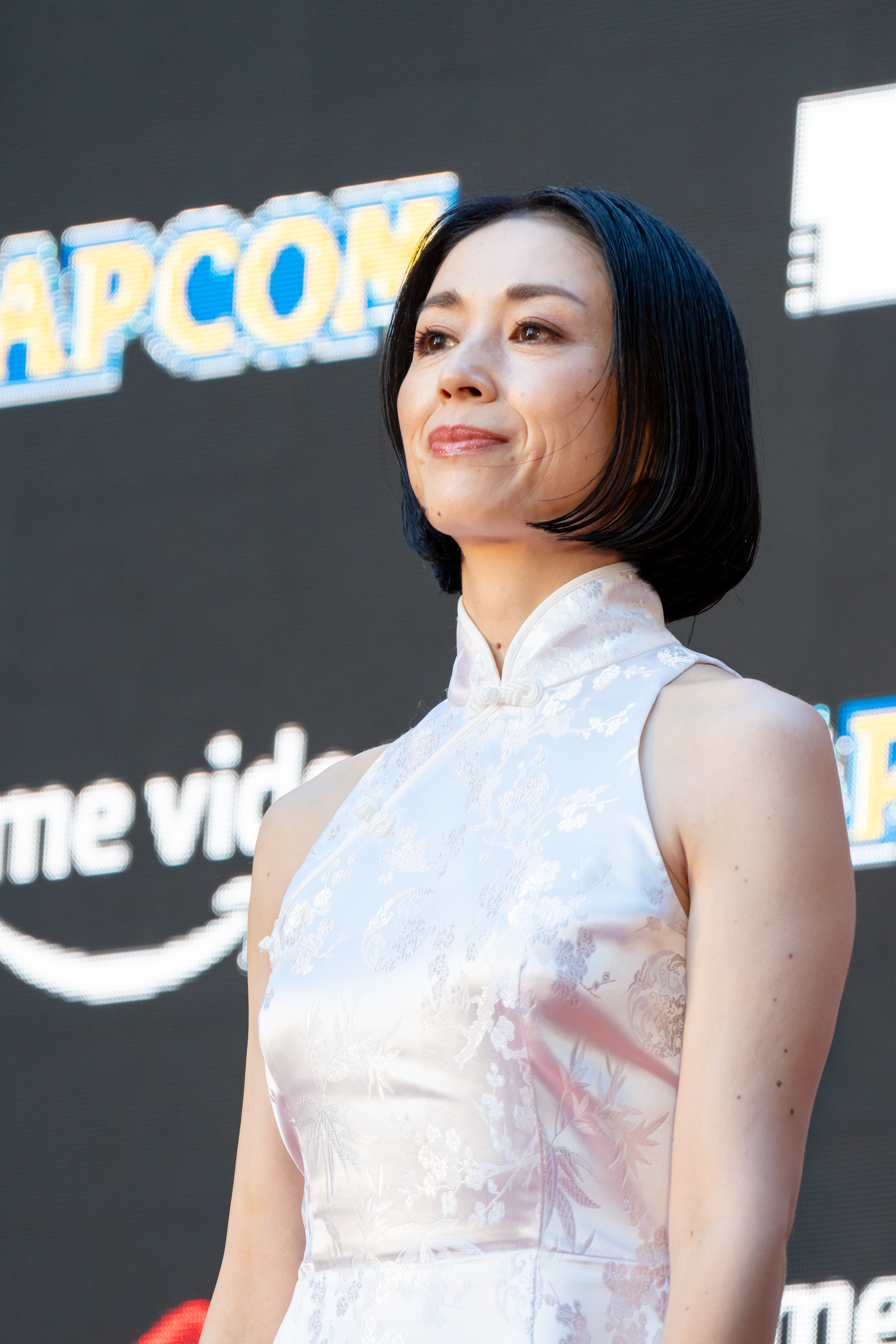
- Nakamura in 2023
- Born: 7 January 1975 (age 51); Fukui, Japan
- Occupation: Actress
- Years active: 1997–present

Yūko Nakamura (中村優子, Nakamura Yūko) is a Japanese actress, born on January 7, 1975 in Fukui, Japan. She won the award for best actress at the Buenos Aires International Festival of Independent Cinema 2001 for the film Firefly (Hotaru) and the award for best supporting actress at the 28th Yokohama Film Festival for Strawberry Shortcakes.

== Filmography ==
=== Film ===
Year	Title	Role	Notes	Ref.
2001	Firefly	Ayako Mizusawa	Lead role	
2003	Suicide Manual	Ricky		
2010	Box: The Hakamada Case	Hideko Hakamada		
2015	Our Little Sister	Yoko Asano		
2015	Fires on the Plain	Tamura's Wife		
2016	The Firefly Summers	Miyako		
2016	The Sun	Junko Okudera		
2019	Moonlit Winter	Jun Katase	South Korean film	
2022	Small, Slow But Steady			
2023	Egoist	Shizuko Saito		
2024	The Box Man			
2024	Worlds Apart	Minori Kōdai		
2026	Cry Out			
2026	A Side Character's Love Story			
2026	All the Lovers in the Night	Kaori		
2026	Satoko Always	Muramoto's wife		

=== Television ===
Year	Title	Role	Notes	Ref.
2007	Perfect Blue Sky	Kiyomi Ishihara	Asadora	
2010-2011	Carnation	Kanako Yoshizawa	Asadora	
2013	Yae's Sakura	Shiori Okesaku	Taiga drama	
2015	Mare	Shiori Okesaku	Asadora	
2017	Hokuto: Some Murderer's Conversion	Misako Hashizume		
2024	Swallows	Ririko Terao		
2026	Straight to Hell			
2026	Blossom	Maki Miyoshi	Asadora	

== Awards and nominations ==
Year	Award	Category	Work(s)	Result	Ref.
2001	Buenos Aires International Festival of Independent Cinema	Best Actress	Firefly	Won	
2007	28th Yokohama Film Festival	Best Supporting Actress	Strawberry Shortcakes	Won	
