= Jun Miho =

Japanese actress (born 1960)

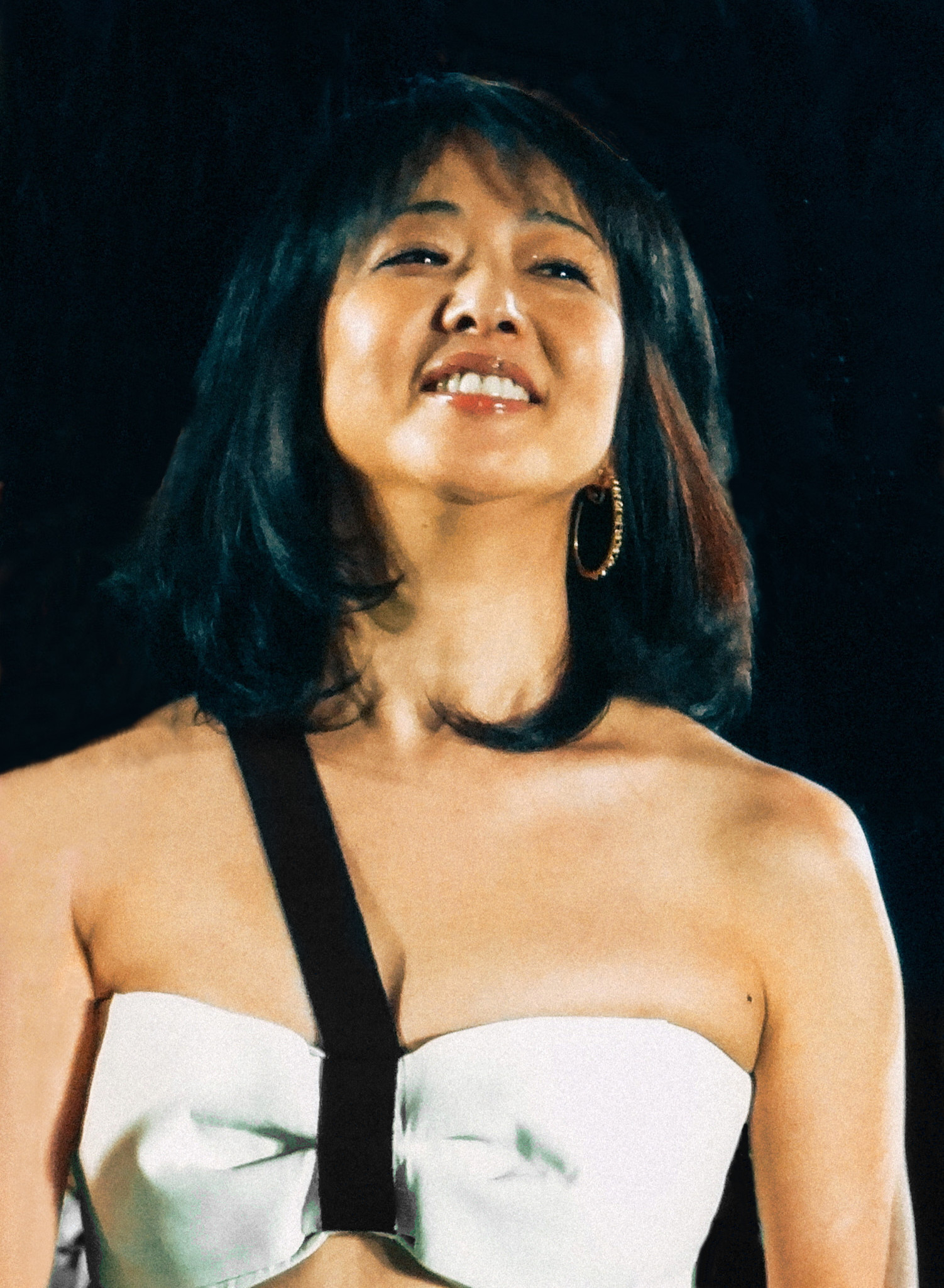
- Jun Miho at the Tokyo International Film Festival in 2013
- Born: 4 August 1960 (age 66); Shizuoka, Shizuoka, Japan
- Occupation: Actress
- Years active: 1981–present

Jun Miho (美保 純, Miho Jun; born 4 August 1960) is a Japanese actress.

== Career ==
Born in Shizuoka, Miho worked at a department store and did some topless glamour modeling before debuting in the Mamoru Watanabe directed Nikkatsu Roman Porno film Uniform Virgin Pain (Seifuku shojo no itami) in September 1981. A few months later, she appeared in another Roman Porno film, Koichiro Uno's Wet and Riding, part of a long series of films from Nikkatsu based on the erotic novels of Kōichirō Uno. In July 1982, Miho starred in the first of Nikkatsu's Pink Curtain series of films. The three episodes in the series follow a brother and sister, trying to put their lives back together after the death of their parents, who fall into an incestuous relationship. According to pink film critics Thomas and Yuko Weisser, the controversial nature of the films made Miho an "overnight sensation" and paved the way to a career in mainstream film. Miho won best newcomer awards at the Japan Academy Prize and at the Blue Ribbon Awards for the Pink Curtain series.

Moving into mainstream roles, she became a regular in the Tora-san film series, playing Akemi, the daughter of the printing shop owner. She has also appeared on television as both an actress and a commentator. A long-playing role in television was the character of Yōko Hīragi, the lawyer daughter of Public Prosecutor Shigeru Hīragi, nicknamed "Red Turnip" (Akakabu). The mystery series began with a set of feature-length TV specials beginning in April 1990 with Akakabu Kenji Funsenki (Prosecutor Red Turnip's Battle at the Court) on Asahi Broadcasting Corporation and continued with two more shows in October 1990 and February 1991. These were followed by an 11-part TV series which ran January–March 1992 and then further TV specials after the TV series ended.

== Filmography ==
=== Film ===
- Uniform Virgin Pain (制服処女のいたみ, Seifuku shojo no itami) (September 1981)
- Koichiro Uno's Wet and Riding (宇能鴻一郎の濡れて騎る, Uno Koichiro no nurete noru) (January 1982)
- Young Girls' Holding Cell (セーラー服鑑別所, Sailor-fuku kanbetsusho) (March 1982)
- Pink Curtain (ピンクのカーテン, Pinku no kaaten) (July 1982)
- Pink Curtain 2 (ピンクのカーテン２, Pinku no kaaten 2) (October 1982)
- Oh! Takarazuka! (ＯＨ！タカラズカ) (December 1982)
- Pink Curtain 3 (ピンクのカーテン３, Pinku no kaaten 3) (March 1983)
- Marriage Counselor Tora-san (1984)
- Tora-san's Forbidden Love (1984)
- Tora-san's Island Encounter (1985)
- Tora-san's Bluebird Fantasy (1986)
- Final Take (1986)
- Tora-san Goes North (1987)
- Tora-san Plays Daddy (1987)
- Yuriko's Aroma (2010)
- A Living Promise (2016)
- The Miracle of Crybaby Shottan (2016)
- Tora-san, Wish You Were Here (2019)
- For Him to Live (2019)
- Missing (2024)
- Tomorrow in the Finder (2024)
- The Boy and the Dog (2025)
- Not Me That Went Viral (2025)
- Grim Reaper Barber (2026), Midori Saeki
- Shadow Work (2026), Michiko

=== Television ===
- Natsu ni Koisuru Onnatachi (1983)
- Hanekonma (1986)
- Rokubanme no Sayoko (2000)
- Dragon Zakura (2005)
- Ultraman Mebius (2006)
- Kodai Shoujo Doguchan (2009)
- Manpuku Shoujo Dragonette (2010)
- Diplomat Kosaku Kuroda (2011)
- Amachan (2013)
- The Emperor's Cook (2015)
- 37.5°C no Namida (2015)
