= Achilles and the Tortoise (film) =

2008 Japanese film

- Film poster
- Directed by: Takeshi Kitano
- Written by: Takeshi Kitano
- Produced by: Masayuki Mori
- Starring: Beat Takeshi; Kanako Higuchi; Yurei Yanagi; Kumiko Asō
- Cinematography: Katsumi Yanagishima
- Edited by: Takeshi Kitano
- Music by: Yuki Kajiura
- Production companies: Bandai Visual; Tokyo FM; TV Asahi; WOWOW
- Distributed by: Tokyo Theatres; Office Kitano
- Release date: September 20, 2008 (Japan)
- Running time: 119 minutes
- Country: Japan
- Language: Japanese

Achilles and the Tortoise (Japanese: アキレスと亀, Hepburn: Akiresu to Kame) is a 2008 Japanese film written, directed and edited by Takeshi Kitano. The film is the third and final part of Kitano's surreal autobiographical trilogy, starting with Takeshis' and continuing with Glory to the Filmmaker!

The title Achilles and the Tortoise refers to the motion paradox by Greek philosopher Zeno of Elea, Achilles and the Tortoise.

== Plot ==
Kitano plays Machisu, who is born into a wealthy family, but loses both his parents as a child. When his father (Akira Nakao) commits suicide after the collapse of his business, Machisu's stepmother (Mariko Tsutsui) sends him to live with an aunt and uncle who mistreat him and finally send him to an orphanage. As a young man, Machisu (Yurei Yanagi) attends art school and finds his style of painting challenged by the more experimental and conceptual work turned in by his classmates. Machisu takes a job in order to pay for art school, and strikes up a friendship with a fellow co-worker, Sachiko (Kumiko Asō), who seems to grasp his artistic vision. They get married and have a daughter. As he grows older, Mashisu's obsession with contemporary art controls his whole life, leaving him insensitive of everything around him, including the death of his own daughter (Eri Tokunaga) and his wife's desertion. He tries to please the art critics, remaining penniless. He is caught up in a fire and almost dies. Losing all his previous works, he is left with a single half-burnt soda can, which he assesses at 200,000 yen and tries to sell. This ends up kicked carelessly away when his wife picks him up from the street. The film ends as they walk away together.

== Cast ==
- Beat Takeshi as Machisu
- Kanako Higuchi as Sachiko
- Yurei Yanagi as Young Machisu
- Kumiko Asō as Young Sachiko
- Akira Nakao as Machisu's father
- Mariko Tsutsui as Machisu's stepmother
- Ren Osugi as Machisu's uncle
- Susumu Terajima as Yakuza pimp
- Eri Tokunaga as Machisu's daughter
- Nao Omori as Art dealer
- Masato Ibu as Art dealer

== Release ==
The film premiered in competition at the 65th Venice Film Festival on August 28, 2008.

== Reception ==
Mark Schilling of The Japan Times gave the film 2 out of 5 stars.
