= Shōfukutei Tsurube II =

Japanese comedian (born 1951)

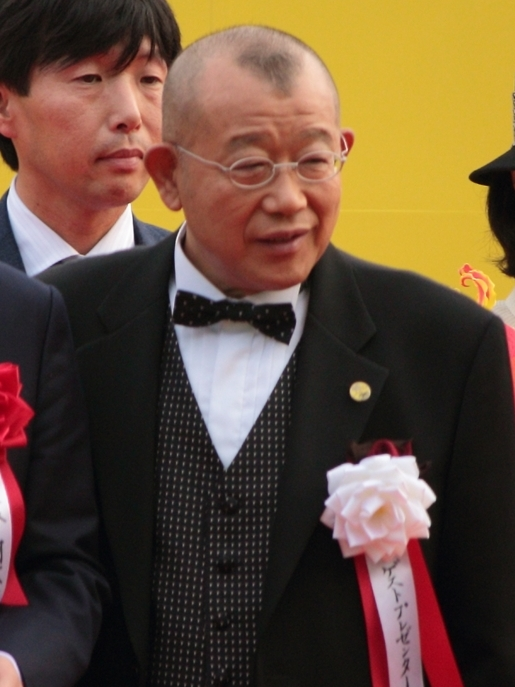
- Shōfukutei Tsurube II in 2015
- Born: Manabu Suruga; 23 December 1951 (age 74); Hirano-ku, Osaka Japan
- Occupations: Comedian, actor
- Years active: 1972–present
- Children: Taro Suruga

Shofukutei Tsurube II (笑福亭 鶴瓶 (2代目), Shōfukutei Tsurube (Nidaime)), born Manabu Suruga (駿河 学, Suruga Manabu), is a Japanese rakugo comedian and actor.

== Filmography ==
=== Film ===
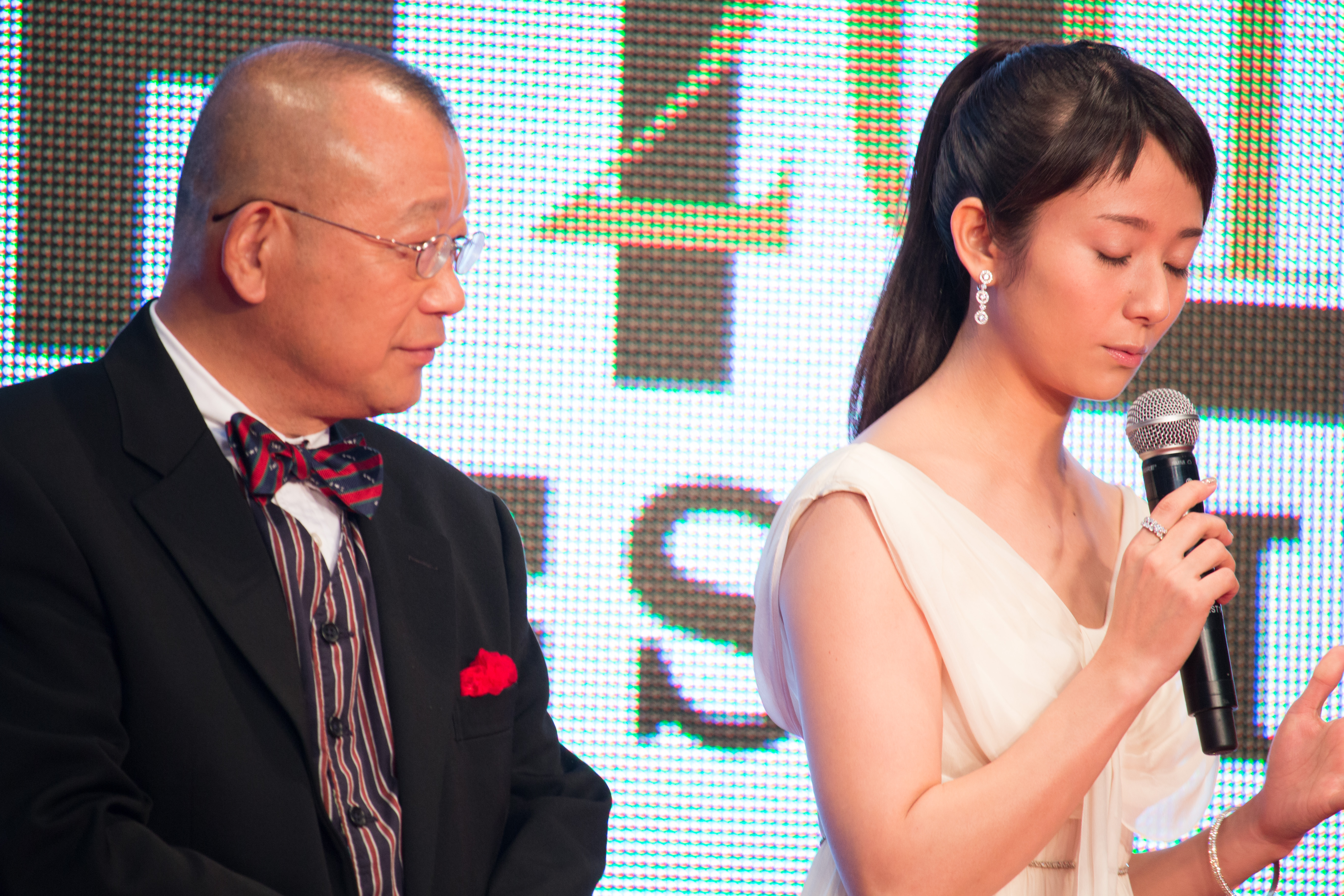
Shōfukutei Tsurube II and Fumino Kimura

- Tokyo Heaven (1990)
- Moving (1993)
- Wait and See (1998)
- Kabei: Our Mother (2008) - Senkichi
- Dear Doctor (2009) - Dr. Osamu Ino
- About Her Brother (2010) - Tetsuro
- Cape Nostalgia (2014) - Tani
- What a Wonderful Family! (2016) - doctor (cameo)
- Black Widow Business (2016) - Funayama
- Gold Medal Man (2016)
- What a Wonderful Family! 2 (2017)
- Sakura Guardian in the North (2018)
- What a Wonderful Family! 3 (2018)
- The Great War of Archimedes (2019) - Kiyoshi Ōsato
- Family of Strangers (2019) - Hidemaru Kajiki
- 99.9 Criminal Lawyer: The Movie (2021) - Ken'ichirō Kawakami
- 7 Secretaries: The Movie (2022)
- Amalock (2024) - Ryūtarō
- The 35-Year Promise (2025) - Tamotsu Nishihata

=== Television drama ===
- Hissatsu Shigotonin V Gekitouhen (1985–86) - San
- Hissatsu Masshigura! (1986)
- Furuhata Ninzaburō (Fuji TV, 1994) - Dai Banzuin
- The Family (TBS, 2007) - Watanuki
- Hanzawa Naoki (TBS, 2013) - Shin'nosuke Hanzawa
- Asa ga Kita (NHK, 2015) - Tomonobu Tamari
- Segodon (NHK, 2018) - Iwakura Tomomi
- Two Homelands (TV Tokyo, 2019) - Shūmei Ōkawa
- The Man Who Stood for Autonomy of Japan: Prime Minister Yoshida Shigeru (TV Tokyo, 2020) - Shigeru Yoshida
- Shizuka-chan and her Papa (NHK, 2022) - Junsuke Nonomura

=== Variety show ===
- Waratte Iitomo! (Fuji TV, 1987 to 2014)

=== Dubbing roles ===
- Despicable Me - Felonious Gru
- Despicable Me 2 - Felonious Gru
- Despicable Me 3 - Felonious Gru
- Minions - Felonious Gru (8 years old)
- Minions: The Rise of Gru - Felonious Gru
- Seasons - Narrator
