= Sway (2006 film) =

- Film poster
- Directed by: Miwa Nishikawa
- Written by: Miwa Nishikawa
- Produced by: Kiichi Kumagai; Hirokazu Kore-eda
- Starring: Jo Odagiri; Teruyuki Kagawa; Masatō Ibu; Hirofumi Arai; Yōko Maki
- Cinematography: Hiroshi Takase
- Edited by: Ryūji Miyajima
- Music by: Cauliflowers
- Release date: July 8, 2006 (Japan)
- Running time: 119 minutes
- Country: Japan
- Language: Japanese

Sway (Japanese: ゆれる, Hepburn: Yureru) is a 2006 Japanese mystery-drama film, directed by Miwa Nishikawa, which features sibling rivalry and a possible murder.

== Plot summary ==
Tokyo fashion photographer Takeru Hayakawa (Jo Odagiri) returns to his hometown for his mother's memorial service. His late arrival at the memorial irritates his father (Masatō Ibu), who accuses him of disrespecting his late mother and shaming their family name. Takeru's older brother Minoru (Teruyuki Kagawa) quickly intervenes and soothes their father with drinks and sympathetic comments.

Takeru and Minoru later have a conversation, which reveals Takeru's thinly veiled contempt towards Minoru for not having the strength to leave their dead-end hometown, but Minoru tells him he doesn't understand how things are and besides, he's fine with the way things are. Takeru later learns that his brother has taken over their family business, a run-down garage, and that his ex-girlfriend, Chieko (Yōko Maki), now works there as a gas attendant.

Chieko and Takeru later meet for drinks, and proceed to have a one-night stand. In the morning after, she hesitantly suggests she would be happy to follow him to Tokyo when he leaves, but he pretends he doesn't hear her.

Minoru realises something has happened between his younger brother and Chieko, and suggests they all should go for a walk along the Hasami River in the mountains where Takeru could take photographs. Chieko, believing this would buy more time with Takeru, immediately agrees. Wanting to get away from their town's mundaneness, Takeru agrees.

During the trip, Takeru distances himself from Chieko by walking ahead of her and Minoru. Whilst on a forested mountain, he takes photographs and through his viewfinder, sees Minoru and Chieko talking on a suspension bridge over a gorge. He looks away to take photographs of flowers.

On the bridge, Minoru tries to catch Chieko when she stumbles, but she recoils from his touch as she shouts at him to get away from her. They stare at each other for a few tense seconds. Minoru asks if she's leaving him for Takeru. Chieko replies that she has no interest in him, and never will.

Takeru glances back to the bridge and sees Minoru alone on the bridge, looking down to the gorge below, and realises Chieko has fallen from the bridge. The police locates Chieko's body in the gorge and arrests Minoru for murder. His father rejects the charge, insisting Minoru isn't the type to kill, but Takeru isn't so sure.

As the case proceeds during a courtroom trial, Takeru begins to doubt his testimony when he realises hidden resentment and deeply buried anger between Minoru and himself, which may have affected what he witnessed on the bridge that afternoon.

== Awards ==
Sway won the Best Film award at the 2007 Yokohama Film Festival. and the Best Film award at the 2006 Mainichi Film Awards.

== Cast ==
- Jo Odagiri - Takeru Hayakawa
- Teruyuki Kagawa - Minoru Hayakawa
- Masatō Ibu - Isamu Hayakawa (father)
- Yōko Maki - Chieko Kawabata
- Hirofumi Arai - Yohei Okajima
- Keizō Kanie - Osamu Hayakawa
- Yūichi Kimura - Akihito Maruo
- Tomorowo Taguchi - Judge
- Pierre Taki - Funaki
