= The Twilight Samurai =

2002 film

- Theatrical release poster
- Directed by: Yoji Yamada
- Written by: Yoji Yamada; Yoshitaka Asama
- Story by: Shuhei Fujisawa
- Produced by: Hiroshi Fukazawa; Shigehiro Nakagawa; Ichirō Yamamoto
- Starring: Hiroyuki Sanada; Rie Miyazawa
- Music by: Isao Tomita
- Production companies: Eisei Gekijo; Hakuhodo; Nippon Shuppan Hanbai (Nippan) K.K.; Nippon TV; Shochiku; Sumitomo Corporation
- Distributed by: Shochiku
- Release date: November 2, 2002 (Japan)
- Running time: 129 minutes
- Country: Japan
- Language: Japanese
- Box office: $10.2 million

The Twilight Samurai (Japanese: たそがれ清兵衛, Hepburn: Tasogare Seibei; lit. "Twilight Seibei") is a 2002 Japanese historical drama film co-written and directed by Yoji Yamada and starring Hiroyuki Sanada and Rie Miyazawa. Set in mid-19th century Japan, a few years before the Meiji Restoration, it follows the life of Seibei Iguchi, an impoverished, low-ranking samurai trapped in a lowly bureaucratic post. Poor, but not destitute, he still manages to lead a content and happy life with his daughters and his mother, who has dementia. Through an unfortunate turn of events, the turbulent times conspire against him.

The film was inspired by the short story "The Bamboo Sword" by Shuhei Fujisawa. The Twilight Samurai won an unprecedented 12 Japanese Academy Awards, including Best Picture, Best Director, Best Actor, Best Actress, and Best Screenplay. The Twilight Samurai was also nominated for the Academy Award for Best Foreign Language Film at the 76th Academy Awards.

== Plot ==
Low-ranking samurai and granary clerk Iguchi Seibei becomes a widower when his wife succumbs to tuberculosis. Nicknamed Tasogare ("Twilight") and frequently disrespected by his coworkers, he often runs home after finishing work to care for his elderly mother and two young daughters, Kayano and Ito, instead of socializing as is expected of him. The clan's lord makes a surprise visit and humiliates Seibei publicly for his filthy, unkempt appearance, as he spends all of his money on his family. Seibei is berated by his uncle, the head of the Iguchi family, for refusing an arranged marriage to a woman he's never met.

Seibei's childhood friend, the high-ranking Iinuma Michinojo, returns home from Kyoto. Michinojo offers Seibei a position in the emperor's guard, but Seibei refuses. He also informs Seibei that his sister Tomoe has divorced her abusive husband, Koda, the son of a samurai captain. Finding his sister at his home, the two siblings talk and reminisce before a drunken Koda confronts them outside. Koda challenges Michinojo to a duel for helping Tomoe with her divorce; Seibei offers to fight him instead with a bamboo pole, effortlessly disarming Koda of his sword and defeating him. Several days later, the clan's chief retainer Yogo tells Seibei that Koda has asked him for help to exact revenge. Before leaving, he compliments Seibei's skills.

Michinojo tells Seibei that Tomoe is willing to marry him, an offer which Seibei declines, reasoning that he does not want Tomoe to share in his poverty and fearing that she will meet the same fate as his late wife. In the middle of the night, Seibei is awoken by his supervisor, who informs him that the clan's officials have requested him. The officials explain that Yogo, who was on the losing side of the clan's succession conflict, has been disowned and refuses to commit harakiri. The officials discover that Seibei is actually the disciple of a skilled swordsman, having been trained with the kodachi. They order him to kill Yogo, promising a rise in rank and pay if he succeeds. Despite requests for time to prepare, Seibei is forced to carry out the mission the next day.

Seibei requests Tomoe's assistance with the rituals of samurai before battle, and he confesses to her that he has always loved her, even while they were both married. He asks for her hand in marriage if he returns, but she tells him that she has already accepted another proposal. Seibei arrives at Yogo's house and finds him drinking in a dark, fly-infested room. Yogo asks Seibei to allow him to run away and describes how both his wife and daughter died of tuberculosis. Seibei recounts his life story, confessing that he was forced to sell his katana to afford his wife's funeral. This angers Yogo, who believes that he is being mocked. The two duel, which ends with Seibei killing Yogo with his kodachi. Seibei limps home and is met by Kayano, Ito, and Tomoe.

Years later, Seibei's younger daughter, Ito, now elderly, visits the graves of Seibei and Tomoe. Ito explains that they married, but Seibei was killed three years later in the Boshin War while fighting on behalf of the doomed Shogunate. After his death, Tomoe took care of them until they were both married. Despite beliefs that Iguchi was an unfortunate man, she disagrees, explaining that despite his lack of ambition, he enjoyed a fulfilling and loving life.

== Cast ==
- Hiroyuki Sanada as Seibei Iguchi
- Rie Miyazawa as Tomoe Iinuma
- Nenji Kobayashi as Choubei Kusaka
- Ren Osugi as Toyotarou Kouda
- Mitsuru Fukikoshi as Michinojo Iinuma
- Hiroshi Kanbe as Naota
- Miki Itō as Kayano Iguchi
- Erina Hashiguchi as Ito Iguchi
- Reiko Kusamura as Iguchi's Mother
- Min Tanaka as Zenemon Yogo
- Keiko Kishi as Ito, as an old woman
- Tetsuro Tamba as Tozaemon Iguchi

== Reception ==
=== Box office ===
In Japan, the film grossed ¥1.2 billion ($9.57 million) in 2002, becoming the year's 16th top-grossing film at the Japanese box office. Overseas, the film grossed $593,547, including $559,765 in North America. This adds up to a total of $10,163,547 grossed worldwide.

=== Critical reaction ===
The Twilight Samurai has a rating of 99% at Rotten Tomatoes, based on 70 reviews, and an average rating of 8.1/10, and is certified as "Fresh". The website's critical consensus states, "Samurai epic as a touching drama". Metacritic gave it an overall score of 82 out of 100, based on 25 critics, indicating "universal acclaim".

Stephen Hunter of The Washington Post stated "This is an absolutely brilliant film but in a quiet way."

Roger Ebert of The Chicago Sun-Times gave it his highest rating, saying, "Seibei's story is told by director Yoji Yamada in muted tones and colors, beautifully re-creating a feudal village that still retains its architecture, its customs, its ancient values, even as the economy is making its way of life obsolete."

The second film of the trilogy, The Hidden Blade (2004), was the choice of Edward Douglas in IndieWire's 2018 list of the best Japanese films of the 21st century, but Douglas said that The Twilight Samurai came close.

=== Awards and nominations ===
The Twilight Samurai won an unprecedented 12 Japanese Academy Awards, including Best Picture, Best Director, Best Actor, Best Actress, and Best Screenplay.

The film also won the following awards:

- Award of the Japanese Academy (2003)
- Blue Ribbon Awards (2003)
- Hawaii International Film Festival (2003)
- Hochi Film Award (2002)
- Hong Kong Film Award (2004)
- Kinema Junpo Award (2003)
- Mainichi Film Concours (2003)
- Nikkan Sports Film Award (2002)
- Udine Far East Film Festival (2004)

The film also received several award nominations. The Twilight Samurai was nominated for the Academy Award for Best Foreign Language Film at the 76th Academy Awards, Japan's first in twenty-two years, losing to the French Canadian (Québec) film The Barbarian Invasions (Les Invasions barbares).

== Soundtrack ==
- Composer: Isao Tomita
- Theme song: "Kimerareta Rizumu" ("The Rhythm which is Decided"), sung by Yōsui Inoue.

== See also ==
- Cinema of Japan
- List of submissions to the 76th Academy Awards for Best Foreign Language Film
- List of Japanese submissions for the Academy Award for Best Foreign Language Film
