= The Hidden Blade =

- Theatrical poster
- Directed by: Yōji Yamada
- Written by: Yoshitaka Asama; Yōji Yamada
- Story by: Shūhei Fujisawa
- Produced by: Hiroshi Fukazawa
- Starring: Masatoshi Nagase; Takako Matsu; Yukiyoshi Ozawa
- Cinematography: Mutsuo Naganuma
- Edited by: Iwao Ishii
- Music by: Isao Tomita
- Distributed by: Shochiku
- Release date: 30 October 2004 (Japan)
- Running time: 132 minutes
- Country: Japan
- Language: Japanese
- Box office: $8,043,781

The Hidden Blade (Japanese: 隠し剣 鬼の爪, Hepburn: Kakushi ken: Oni no tsume; literally "Hidden Blade: Oni's Claw") is a 2004 film set in 1860s Japan, directed by Yoji Yamada. The plot revolves around several samurai during a time of change in the ruling and class structures of Japan. The film was written by Yamada with Yoshitaka Asama and, like its predecessor The Twilight Samurai (2002), based on a short story by Shūhei Fujisawa. The soundtrack is an original composition by Isao Tomita.

== Plot ==
The story takes place in Japan in the 1860s, a time of cultural assimilation. Two samurai, Munezo Katagiri (Masatoshi Nagase) and Samon Shimada (Hidetaka Yoshioka), bid farewell to their friend Yaichiro Hazama (Yukiyoshi Ozawa), who is to serve in Edo (present-day Tokyo) under the shogunate of that region. Though the position is desirable, Katagiri voices his concern that a man of Yaichiro’s character is likely to get into trouble. His doubts are confirmed when the married Yaichiro expresses an intention to indulge in Edo’s sensual pleasures while stationed there.

During dinner that evening, Katagiri’s mother reminds Samon of the financial hardships the family has endured since the death of her husband (who committed ritual suicide after financial improprieties were discovered on a construction project). She desires a match between Samon and Shino (Tomoko Tabata), Katagiri’s sister. Also present is Kie (Takako Matsu), the Katagiri’s housekeeper, who is literate and schooled in etiquette. In a voiceover, Katagiri hints at his affection for Kie, but then relates that around the same time Shino married Samon, Kie married a man of the merchant class and left the Katagiri household.

Three years pass, during which Katagiri's mother passes away. While walking through town, he sees Kie in a kimono shop where she assures him that she is well. Months later, however, Shino tells Katagiri that from the start of her marriage, Kie has been forced to perform all manner of duties to the point that she is little more than a slave to her new family, and that she is gravely ill. Concerned, Katagiri visits Mrs. Iseya (Sachiko Mitsumoto), Kie’s mother-in-law, and finds Kie incoherent with illness. Outraged, he demands that Kie’s husband file divorce papers, and then carries her to his own house to recover.

The changing times have forced Katagiri and his fellow samurai to learn the techniques of Western weaponry, which the elder members of the clan disdain. Word arrives from Edo that government officials thwarted an uprising against the shogun and that Yaichiro, Katagiri’s friend, was involved. After being brought back to the village in a prisoner's cage, Yaichiro is denied the honor of ritual suicide and must live out the remainder of his days in a cell. Believing that Yaichiro’s friends are complicit, Hori (Ken Ogata), the clan’s chief retainer, demands that Katagiri identify them, but he refuses, citing his honor as a samurai, and he is dismissed.

Meanwhile, Kie has since recovered and is once again Katagiri’s housekeeper. Though their fondness for one other is evident, Kie and Katagiri are keenly aware of the difference in their social class and act accordingly. Nonetheless, gossip prompts Katagiri to send Kie back to the countryside to live with her father. Shortly after, Yaichiro breaks out of prison and takes a family hostage. Hori demands that Katagiri dispatch him.

Knowing that Yaichiro is the better swordsman, Katagiri visits their former teacher (Min Tanaka), who is now a farmer, and learns a dangerous maneuver that involves turning one's back on the enemy. The next day, Katagiri arrives on the outskirts of the village and attempts to persuade Yaichiro to surrender. When the latter refuses (accusing Hori and the other leaders of incompetence), the two engage in one-to-one combat during which Katagiri uses the new technique to deliver a severe wound. Yaichiro attempts the same maneuver, but is gunned down by foot soldiers hiding in the woods. Knowing that this manner of death is a dishonor to a samurai, Katagiri is dismayed. Upon returning to the village, he encounters Yaichiro’s wife (Reiko Takashima), who reveals that she paid a visit to Hori the night before and exchanged sexual favors for his promise to keep Yaichiro alive (a promise that he never planned to keep). Bound by an oath to commit suicide should Yaichiro die, she takes her own life.

Unsure of his fealty, Katagiri approaches Hori with his treachery, to which he crudely admits. Realizing that the Hazamas were victims of a corrupt system, Katagiri avenges them by stabbing Hori in the heart with a thin blade (the technique known as “the hidden blade”, which leaves almost no trace of blood—in the original Japanese version the technique is actually called "the demon's claw/scratch" as the entry wound it leaves is so small that it appears to be caused by a nonhuman perpetrator). Katagiri buries the blade at the Hazama’s grave as a form of atonement and relinquishes his samurai status. Resolved to become a tradesman, he leaves the village for the island of Ezo (modern-day Hokkaido), but not before visiting Kie. With difference of social status no longer an obstacle, Katagiri proposes marriage and Kie accepts. The film ends as they hold hands sitting on a hilltop, envisioning their future together.

== Cast ==
- Masatoshi Nagase - Munezo Katagiri
- Takako Matsu - Kie
- Hidetaka Yoshioka - Samon Shimada
- Yukiyoshi Ozawa - Yaichiro Hazama
- Tomoko Tabata - Shino Katagiri
- Reiko Takashima - Hazama's wife
- Kunie Tanaka - Katagiri Kanbee
- Chieko Baisho - Mrs. Katagiri
- Min Tanaka - Kansai Toda
- Nenji Kobayashi - Ogata
- Ken Ogata - Chief Retainer Hori
- Hiroshi Kanbe - Naota
- Sachiko Mitsumoto - Mrs. Iseya
- Nana Saito - Bun

== Reception ==
The Hidden Blade has an 84% approval rating on Rotten Tomatoes, with the critical consensus on it stated as, "A slow and steady samurai flick a la John Ford that brings emotions and psychology to an epic-scale adventure." The film also holds a 76/100 on Metacritic based on 11 reviews.

The Hidden Blade was the choice of Edward Douglas in IndieWire's 2018 list of the best Japanese films of the 21st century. He called it "one of the best non-Kurosawa samurai films."

== Awards ==
In addition to 16 nominations, the film received the following awards:

- The Japanese Academy Award for "Best Art Direction" to Mitsuo Degawa and Yoshinobu Nishioka
- Hochi Film Award for "Best Actress" to Takako Matsu
- Mainichi Film Concours for "Best Supporting Actress" to Tomoko Tabata
