= Teruyuki Kagawa =

Japanese actor (born 1965)

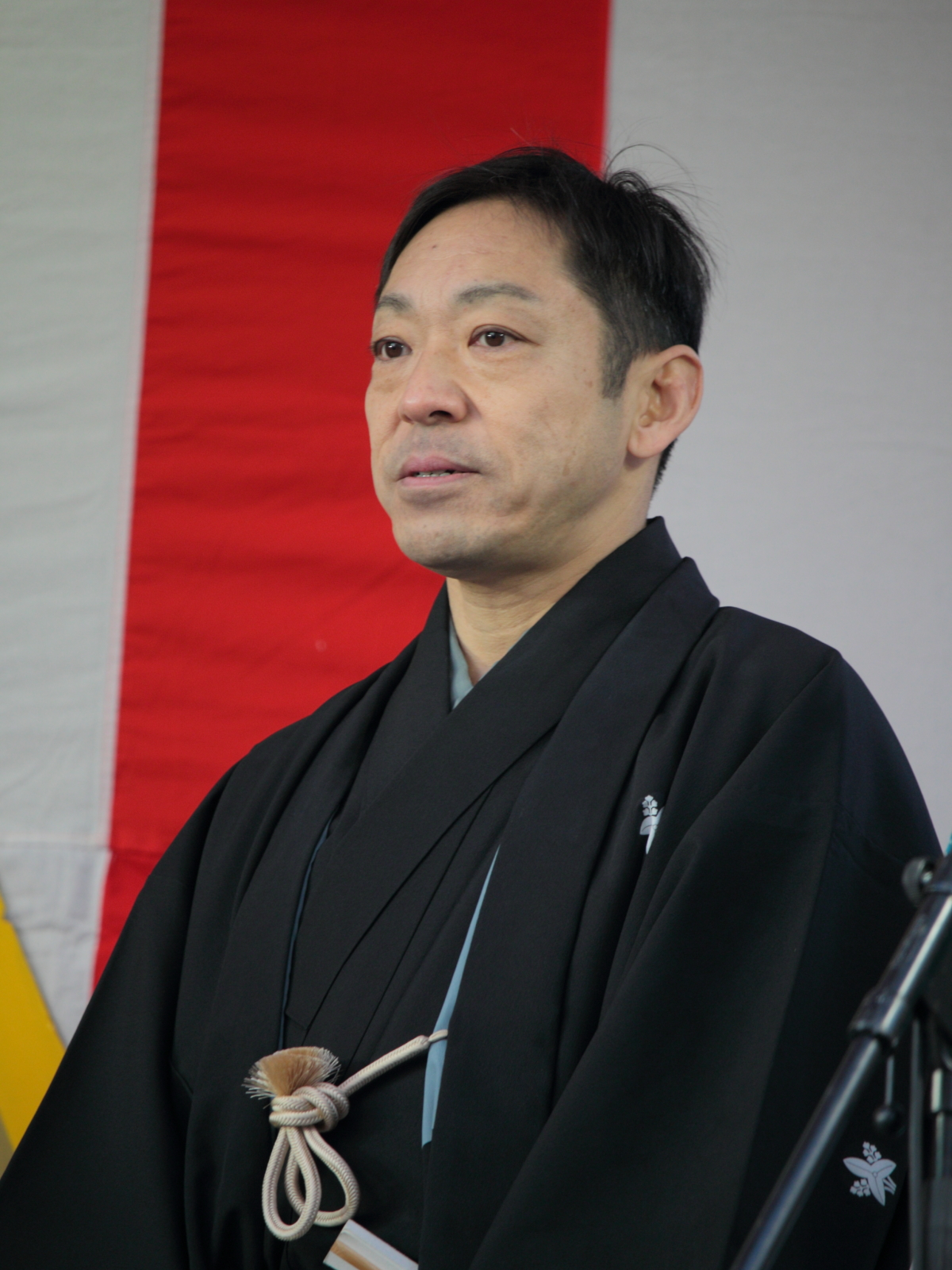
- Born: December 7, 1965 (age 60); Tokyo, Japan
- Other names: Ichikawa Chūsha IX; Master Kamakiri
- Education: University of Tokyo
- Occupation: Actor
- Years active: 1989–present
- Agent: Lotus Roots
- Children: Ichikawa Danko V (son)
- Parent(s): Ichikawa Ennosuke III (father); Yūko Hama (mother)
- Relatives: Ichikawa Danshirō II (great-great-grandfather); Ichikawa En'ō I (great-grandfather); Ichikawa Danshirō III (grandfather); Ichikawa Danshirō IV (uncle); Ichikawa Ennosuke IV (cousin)
- Website: Teruyuki Kagawa Official Site

Teruyuki Kagawa (香川 照之, Kagawa Teruyuki; born December 7, 1965) is a Japanese actor, kabuki actor (as Ichikawa Chūsha IX (九代目 市川中車, Kyūdaime Ichikawa Chūsha)), and boxing commentator. Unlike most other Kabuki actors in his family (such as his father Ichikawa En'ō II and his cousin Ichikawa Ennosuke IV) who play both male and female roles, he is a tachiyaku actor, meaning his specialty is playing male roles, as well as being known for being one of the best katakiyaku actors (i.e., kabuki actors specializing in villain roles) of the current generation of Kabuki actors.

== Biography ==
Born in 1965, his parents are kabuki actor Ichikawa Ennosuke III and cinema actress Yuko Hama. His grandmother is film actress Sanae Takasugi.

In the Kabuki world, it is common for the son of an actor to follow in his father's footsteps from a very early age, but his parents divorced in 1968 and his mother was given custody. After that, he totally lost contact with his father, and his mother refused to give him any training in the Kabuki art and he grew believing that it was "something that must not be watched". However he tried several times to meet his biological father. When he was 20, he went to one of his performances and asked if he could see him, stating that he was Ennosuke's son, but when his father's assistants reported to him the situation he refused, stating that he didn't have any son.

He graduated in social psychology at the University of Tokyo and decided to start a career in cinema.

=== Sexual assault ===
On August 24, 2022, a Japanese media outlet reported that Kagawa had forcibly touched a woman in July, 2019. Kagawa admitted to the sexual misconduct through his agency, Lotus Roots, on August 25, 2022.

== Career ==
He has twice been nominated for the Best Supporting Actor award at the Japanese Academy Awards, once for Warau Iemon and once for Kita no zeronen. He won the award for best supporting actor at the 33rd Japan Academy Prize for Mt. Tsurugidake.

== Reconciliation with his father ==
His first son Masaaki, born in 2004, showed interest in becoming a Kabuki actor. As a result, Teruyuki tried again to meet with his aged father and succeeded.

At the same time, he decided to start his own career in Kabuki at 46, an age which is extremely unusual for an actor. The only other time someone was initiated into the Kabuki world as a fully grown adult was in 1910, when Ichikawa Danjuro IX's adopted and then son-in-law Ichikawa Sansho V decided to start his career at age 28 after his adoptive father's death.

In June 2012, it was announced at their father and cousin's shūmei that he and his son would take the names of Ichikawa Chusha IX and Ichikawa Danko V.

== Filmography ==
=== Film ===
Year	Title	Role	Notes	Ref.
1998	Serpent's Path	Tatsuo Miyashita		
2000	Devils on the Doorstep	Kosaburo Hanaya	Chinese film	
2000	Suri			
2001	Man Walking on Snow	Rajuchi		
2002	Doing Time			
2003	Nuan	Yawa		
2004	Akai Tsuki			
2004	Warau Iemon			
2004	Heaven's Bookstore	Takimoto		
2004	Quill	Isamu Nii		
2005	Bashing	Hotel manager		
2005	Kita no zeronen			
2005	The Milkwoman			
2005	What the Snow Brings			
2006	Sway	Minoru Hayakawa		
2006	Memories of Tomorrow	Atsushi Kawamura		
2006	Memories of Matsuko	Norio Kawajiri		
2007	Sukiyaki Western Django	Sheriff Hoanka		
2007	Kisaragi	Ichigo Musume		
2008	Tokyo!	Hikikomori	Lead role; "Shaking Tokyo" segment	
2008	Tokyo Sonata	Ryūhei Sasaki	Lead role	
2008	20th Century Boys: Beginning of the End	Yoshitsune		
2009	20th Century Boys 2: The Last Hope	Yoshitsune		
2009	20th Century Boys 3: Redemption	Yoshitsune		
2009	John Rabe	Prince Asaka Yasuhiko	German-Chinese-French film	
2009	Snow Prince	Arima Masamitsu		
2009	Mt. Tsurugidake			
2009	Kaiji: Jinsei Gyakuten Game	Yukio Tonegawa		
2011	Tormented	Kohei		
2011	Ashita no Joe	Danpei Tange		
2011	Kaiji 2: Jinsei Dakkai Game	Yukio Tonegawa		
2011	Isoroku	Kagekiyo Munakata		
2012	Key of Life	Kondo		
2012	Rurouni Kenshin	Takeda Kanryū		
2015	Mozu	Ryōta Ōsugi		
2016	Creepy	Nishino		
2019	Whistleblower	Makoto Kitagawa		
2021	99.9 Criminal Lawyer: The Movie	Atsuhiro Sada		
2022	Doraemon: Nobita's Little Star Wars 2021	Gilmore (voice)		
2022	Roleless	Miyamatsu	Lead role	
2026	Sai: Disaster	That man	Lead role	

=== Television drama ===
Year	Title	Role	Notes	Ref.
1989	Kasuga no Tsubone	Kobayakawa Hideaki	Taiga drama	
1989	Onihei Hankachō			
1990	Wataru Seken wa Oni Bakari	Masayuki Tōyama		
2000	Aoi	Ukita Hideie	Taiga drama	
2002	Toshiie and Matsu	Toyotomi Hideyoshi	Taiga drama	
2006	Kōmyō ga Tsuji	Rokuheita	Taiga drama	
2006	Taigan no Kanojo	Narahashi Fumimasa		
2006	Unfair	Sato Kazuo		
2006	Unfair the Special - Code Breaking	Sato Kazuo		
2006	Yakusha Damashii!	Yanagisawa Mitsuharu		
2007	Shimane no Bengoshi	Akita Ryoichi		
2007	Onward Towards Our Noble Deaths	Mizuki Shigeru & Private (Second Class) Maruyama	Lead role; television film	
2009	Mr. Brain	Tanbara Tomomi		
2009–2010	Clouds Over the Hill	Masaoka Shiki		
2010	Ryōmaden	Iwasaki Yataro	Taiga drama	
2011	Diplomat Kosaku Kuroda	Takeshi Shimomura		
2012	Penance			
2013–2020	Hanzawa Naoki	Akira Ohwada	2 seasons	
2016	Montage	Akira Shōji	Mini-series	
2016	Yuriko-san no Ehon	Makoto Onodera	Lead role; television film	
2016	The Sniffer	Komukai		
2019	Everyone's Demoted	Tōru Mayama		
2021	Japan Sinks: People of Hope	Yūichi Tadokoro		
2022	Roppongi Class	Shigeru Nagaya		
2025	Sai: Disaster	That man	Lead role	

=== Other television ===
Year	Title	Notes
2021–22	The Time	Friday host

=== Video games ===
Year	Title	Role
2026	Yakuza Kiwami 3 & Dark Ties	Goh Hamazaki

== Awards ==
- Teruyuki Kagawa was honored with the John Rabe Award in 2009 by the John Rabe Communication Centre in Heidelberg and the Austrian Peace Service.
