= Yoshinaga Fujita =

Japanese novelist and screenwriter (1950–2020)

- Born: 12 April 1950; Fukui
- Died: 30 January 2020 (aged 69)
- Occupation: Novelist
- Spouse: Mariko Koike
- Writing career
- Language: Japanese
- Genre: Crime

Yoshinaga Fujita (藤田 宜永, Fujita Yoshinaga; 12 April 1950 – 30 January 2020) was a Japanese novelist and screenwriter. He was known for his works in the crime novel, adventure novel and romance novel genres.

== Biography ==
After graduating from a local middle school, Yoshinaga Fujita transferred in 1966 to the high school affiliated with Waseda University in Tokyo. While living in a rented room, he spent night after night roaming the city's entertainment districts, leading a chaotic youth. This period of his life is frankly and candidly depicted in his autobiographical novel Aisazu ni wa irarenai (愛さずにはいられない, I Cannot Help but Love). After dropping out of Waseda University, Fujita moved to France in 1973 and lived in Paris. There, he led an unsteady life without regular employment until he ran out of money and began working for an airline. After a seven-year stay, he returned to Japan in 1980. Some episodes from his time in Paris are reflected in his novel Onna (女, Femme).

After returning to Japan, he worked as a French teacher and—through his acquaintance with writer Kiyoshi Kasai, whom he had met in Paris—began translating crime fiction. He also started publishing essays in magazines. In 1985, he released his first book, Rabu songu no kigōgaku (ラブソングの記号学, The Semiotics of the Love Song). The following year, he made his literary debut with the hardboiled novel Yabō no rabirinsu (野望のラビリンス, Labyrinth of Ambitions), featuring a Japanese private detective based in Paris. Initially, he focused on crime and spy novels, often set in international locations. His early works were strongly influenced by French crime fiction, a legacy of his years in Paris.

In the 1990s, he increasingly turned to the theme of love. His style combined psychological depth with a clear narrative structure. He gained widespread attention with the novel Ai no ryōbun (愛の領分, The Territory of Love), which earned him the prestigious Naoki Prize in 2001. Fujita often incorporated autobiographical elements into his work, especially his difficult relationship with his mother, which he addressed in his novel Aisazu ni wa irarenai (愛さずにはいられない, I Cannot Help but Love). The novel is considered his most personal and explores the inner conflict of a young man who is simultaneously attracted to and repelled by women—an ambivalence rooted in his childhood. Natsuo Kirino described him in an obituary as a writer who made “anti-love” the central theme of his work.

Other well-known works include Yabō no rabirinsu (野望のラビリンス, Labyrinth of Ambitions) and Koi (恋, Love), which blend elements of classic romance narratives with thriller motifs. In his later work, Fujita developed a more nuanced storytelling style and increasingly dealt with interpersonal abysses, especially in the context of relationship conflicts.

Several of his novels were adapted into films, including Tenten (転々, Adrift in Tokyo), which was directed by Satoshi Miki and released in 2007.

== Prizes ==
- 1995: Mystery Writers of Japan Award for Kōtetsu no kishi
- 1999: Shimase Literary Prize for Love Stories for Kyūai
- 2001: Naoki Prize for Ai no ryōbun
- 2017: Yoshikawa Eiji Prize for Literature for Ōyuki monogatari

Source: World of Literary Prizes

== Selected works ==
=== Novels ===
- Rabu songu no kigōgaku (ラブ・ソングの記号学, The Semiotics of the Love Song), 1985
- Yabō no rabirinsu (野望のラビリンス, Labyrinth of Ambitions), 1986
- Kōtetsu no kishi (鋼鉄の騎士, The Knight of Steel), 1994
- Kyūai (求愛, Courtship), 1998
- Ai no ryōbun (愛の領分, The Territory of Love), 2001
- Warau kaeru (笑う蛙, The Laughing Frog), 2002
- Onna (女, Femme), 2003
- Aisazu ni wa irarenai (愛さずにはいられない, I Cannot Help but Love), 2003
- Tenten (転々, Adrift in Tokyo), 2007
- Ōyuki monogatari (大雪物語, Tales of the Great Snow), 2019

=== Screenplays ===
- Tenten (転々, Adrift in Tokyo), 2007
- Shikyū no kioku (子宮の記憶, Memories of the Womb), 2007
- Senryokugai tsūkoku (戦力外通告, Declared Unfit for Duty), 2009

== Personal life ==
From 1984 until his death from lung cancer in 2020, he was married to fellow writer Mariko Koike.
