= 34th Japan Academy Film Prize =

Japanese film award ceremony in 2011

- Date: February 18, 2011
- Site: Grand Prince Hotel New Takanawa, Tokyo, Japan
- Hosted by: Tsutomu Sekine; Takako Matsu

Highlights
- Most nominations: Villain; Confessions; 13 Assassins

The 34th Japan Academy Film Prize (第34回日本アカデミー賞) is the 34th edition of the Japan Academy Film Prize, an award presented by the Nippon Academy-Sho Association to award excellence in filmmaking. It awarded the best films of 2010 and it took place on February 18, 2011 at the Grand Prince Hotel New Takanawa in Tokyo, Japan.

== Nominees ==
=== Awards ===
Picture of the Year	Animation of the Year
Confessions; Villain; Otōto; The Lone Scalpel; 13 Assassins	The Secret World of Arrietty; Colorful; Doraemon: Nobita's Great Battle of the Mermaid King; Detective Conan: The Lost Ship in the Sky; One Piece Film: Strong World
Director of the Year	Screenplay of the Year
Tetsuya Nakashima – Confessions; Izuru Narushima – The Lone Scalpel; Takashi Miike – 13 Assassins; Yoji Yamada – Otōto; Lee Sang-il – Villain	Tetsuya Nakashima – The Lone Scalpel; Masato Katō – The Lone Scalpel; Daisuke Tengan – 13 Assassins; Yoji Yamada and Emiko Hiramatsu – Otōto; Shuichi Yoshida and Lee Sang-il – Villain
Outstanding Performance by an Actor in a Leading Role	Outstanding Performance by an Actress in a Leading Role
Satoshi Tsumabuki – Villain; Shōfukutei Tsurube – Otōto; Shinichi Tsutsumi – The Lone Scalpel; Etsushi Toyokawa – Sword of Desperation; Kōji Yakusho – 13 Assassins	Eri Fukatsu – Villain; Shinobu Terajima – Caterpillar; Takako Matsu – Confessions; Hiroko Yakushimaru – Kondo wa Aisaika; Sayuri Yoshinaga – Otōto
Outstanding Performance by an Actor in a Supporting Role	Outstanding Performance by an Actress in a Supporting Role
Akira Emoto – Villain; Renji Ishibashi – Kondo wa Aisaika; Masaki Okada – Villain; Masaki Okada – Confessions; Kōji Kikkawa – Sword of Desperation	Kirin Kiki – Villain; Yū Aoi – Otōto; Yoshino Kimura – Confessions; Yui Natsukawa – The Lone Scalpel; Hikari Mitsushima – Villain
Popularity Award	Newcomer of the Year
Takashi Okamura Tidakankan: Umi to Sango to Chiisana Kiseki (Actor Category); SP The Motion Picture Yabō-hen (Production Category)	Mana Ashida – Ghost: Mouichido Dakishimetai; Momoka Ōno – Kinako; Riisa Naka – Zebraman 2: Attack on Zebra City and Time Traveller: The Girl Who Leapt Through Time; Kento Nagayama – Soft Boy; Shohei Miura – Umizaru 3: The Last Message; Takahiro Miura – Railways
Outstanding Achievement in Music	Outstanding Achievement in Cinematography
Joe Hisaishi – Villain; Kōji Endō – 13 Assassins; Grand Funk Ink. – Beck; Isao Tomita – Otōto; Meina Co. – Kondo wa Aisaika	Nobuyasu Kita – 13 Assassins; Shōichi Atō and Atsushi Ozawa – Confessions; Kōichi Ishii – Sword of Desperation; Norimichi Kasamatsu – Villain; Masashi Chikamori – Otōto
Outstanding Achievement in Lighting Direction	Outstanding Achievement in Art Direction
Yoshi Watabe – 13 Assassins; Susumu Takakura – Confessions; Atsuki Shiihara – Sword of Desperation; Kazuhiro Iwashita – Villain; Kōichi Watanabe – Otōto	Yūji Hayashida – 13 Assassins; Towako Kuwajima – Confessions; Yōhei Taneda and Ryō Sugimoto – Villain; Hidefumi Hanatani – Ōoku; Toshiyuki Matsumiya – Sakurada Mongai no Hen
Outstanding Achievement in Sound Recording	Outstanding Achievement in Film Editing
Jun Nakamura – 13 Assassins; Kazumi Kishida – Otōto; Mitsugu Shiratori – Villain; Yasushi Tanaka – Sword of Desperation; Masato Yano – Confessions	Yoshiyuki Koike – Confessions; Iwao Ishii – Otōto; Tsuyoshi Imai – Villain; Chieko Suzaki – Sword of Desperation; Kenji Yamashita – 13 Assassins
Outstanding Foreign Language Film	Special Award from the Chairman
Avatar; Inception; Invictus; Toy Story 3; The Hurt Locker	Umetsugu Inoue (Director); Tanie Kitabayashi (Actress); Takeo Kimura (Art Director); Keiju Kobayashi (Actor); Katsumi Nishikawa (Director)
Shigeru Okada Prize	Special Award from the Association
Eizō Kyōto	Ryūzō Ueno (Fight Director); Hiroshi Kuze (Fight Director); Ryōji Matsumoto (Set Decorator); Nobuo Yajima (Special Effects Director); Teruyo Nogami (Recording and Kurosawa-gumi Production Manager)
