= Tomohiro Kaku =

Japanese actor (born 1984)

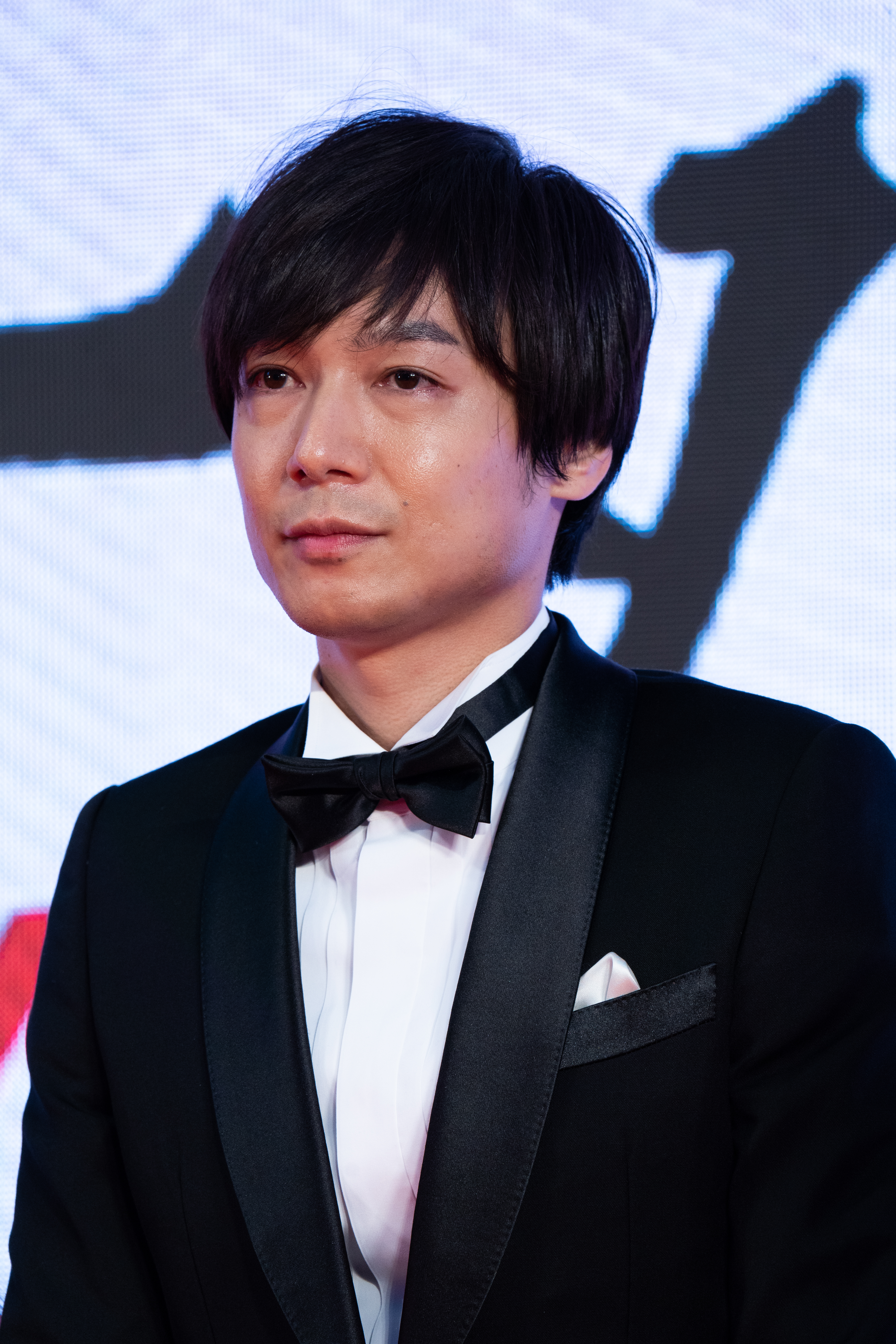
- Kaku at the 2019 Tokyo International Film Festival
- Born: September 5, 1984 (age 41); Kobe, Hyogo, Japan

Tomohiro Kaku (郭智博, Kaku Tomohiro; born September 5, 1984) is a Japanese actor.

== Filmography ==
=== TV ===
- Higurashi When They Cry (BS SkyPerfect TV, 2016) – Kyōsuke Irie
- Crow's Blood (Hulu, 2016)
- ROOKIES (TBS, 2008, ep 8 - 9)
- Hana Yori Dango (TBS, 2005)
- Medaka (Fuji TV, 2004, ep 3)
- Stand Up!! (TBS, 2003)
- Toshiie and Matsu (NHK, 2002)
- Handoku (TBS, 2001)
- Seija no Koushin (TBS, 1998)

=== Films ===
- Ju-on: The Curse 2 (2000)
- All About Lily Chou-Chou (2001)
- Fifteen (2001)
- Hana and Alice (2004) – Masashi Miyamoto
- School Days (2005)
- Rainbow Song (2006)
- Yoru no Picnic / Night Time Picnic (2006)
- Kyōfu (2010)
- Household X (2011) – Hiroaki
- The Case of Hana & Alice (2014 anime) – Asanaga-sensei
- Gantz: O (2016 CG anime film) – Jōichirō Nishi
- Mesuneko-tachi / Female Cats (2017) - Takada
- For Him to Live (2019)
