= Turtles Are Surprisingly Fast Swimmers =

2005 film by Satoshi Miki

- Theatrical release poster
- Kanji: 亀は意外と速く泳ぐ
- Revised Hepburn: Kame wa Igai to Hayaku Oyogu
- Directed by: Satoshi Miki
- Written by: Satoshi Miki
- Produced by: Akiko Sasaki; Naoki Hashimoto; Shin'ichirō Sakaguchi
- Starring: Juri Ueno; Yū Aoi; Jun Kaname; Masatō Ibu; Yutaka Matsushige
- Cinematography: Gen Kobayashi
- Edited by: Nobuyuki Takahashi
- Music by: Remioromen
- Production company: Wilco Co.
- Distributed by: Gold View Company
- Release date: July 2, 2005 (Japan)
- Running time: 90 minutes
- Country: Japan
- Language: Japanese
- Box office: $10,458

Turtles Are Surprisingly Fast Swimmers (Japanese: 亀は意外と速く泳ぐ, Hepburn: Kame wa Igai to Hayaku Oyogu), also known as Turtles Swim Faster Than Expected, is a 2005 Japanese comedy film written and directed by Satoshi Miki.

== Plot ==
Suzume Katagura is an ordinary young housewife whose husband has been sent overseas on business and calls her every day just to remind her to feed his pet turtle, Taro. She craves excitement in her life and longs to escape her mundane existence. On one occasion, she accidentally floods her apartment while filling Taro's water tank, forcing her to call a plumber. Suzume was born on the same day at the same hospital as her childhood best friend, Kujaku Ogitani, who leads a much more interesting life and still wants more, namely a husband in Paris and a house with a view of the Eiffel Tower.

While Suzume is running up a steep set of stairs on her way home, a cart filled with apples accidentally unloads. As she ducks to avoid being hit by the apples, she notices a tiny flyer advertising for spies on a nearby railing. After unsuccessfully trying to make her life more interesting, she replies to the advert and visits a ramshackle home to meet the spy masters, unemployed couple Shizuo and Etsuko Kugitani, who work for an organization that is never referred to by name. They pay her 5 million yen and inform her that her job is to remain completely boring and ordinary. She has this reiterated to her when she buys a pair of sunglasses to make herself feel more like a spy.

Suzume meets Kujaku in line for a chance to spin a wheel and win marvelous prizes—including a trip to France, hence Kujaku's excitement. While they miss out on a trip to France, they do win a fishing trip, which Suzume is more excited about than Kujaku. Suzume explains that she can never say "no" to Kujaku, because when they were young, Kujaku cut off the power in the village so that Suzume could see her childhood sweetheart, Kato, in his pajamas, electrocuting herself in the process. The fishing trip is cut short when a dead body is discovered in the water. An unnamed group takes notice of the fact that the corpse did not belong to a Japanese, and was probably a spy, which starts an investigation to recruit more spies.

Meanwhile, Suzume meets Kato, only to discover, to her horror, that he is bald. While he meets her again the next day, his son comes looking for him, takes him away, and he is never seen again. Eventually, the spies are contacted by the government of their group, who instruct them to return to their country. Suzume is told to say goodbye to all of her friends and family, as she may never see them again. However, Kujaku is missing, and the mysterious group appear outside her door.

As Suzume prepares to forsake her old life (symbolized by throwing Taro into the river), she sees Kato's son drowning in the river and instinctively rescues him. Witnesses report their statement to the news, and soon her facial composite appears all over the news. When the order is given for the spies to return, the mysterious group are already patrolling the streets, making escape impossible. To ensure her fellow spies can return safely, Suzume cuts the power in the same fashion that Kujaku did when they were young.

When the spies all finally meet at the rendezvous point, Shizuo and Etsuko tell Suzume to return to her old life, as the government has ordered her to stay out of the operation. An elderly woman on a bench (previously referred to as a "bench hag") reveals herself to be the leader of the operation, and opens a trap door beneath her bench. Suzume waves goodbye to everyone as they walk inside. When Kujaku is arrested for espionage in a prison overlooking the Eiffel Tower, after inadvertently picking up a letter exchanged between spies, Suzume sets off to rescue her friend.

== Cast ==
- Juri Ueno as Suzume Katakura
- Yū Aoi as Kujaku Ogitani
- Ryō Iwamatsu as Shizuo Kugitani
- Eri Fuse as Etsuko Kugitani
- Yutaka Matsushige as the ramen chef
- Toshifumi Muramatsu as the tofu shop owner
- Yasuhito Hida as the plumber
- Jun Kaname as Kato
- Yoshiyuki Morishita as the sweets shop owner
- Shunsuke Matsuoka as Nirayama
- Kenji Mizuhashi as the motorcycle police officer
- Yoichi Nukumizu as the hairdresser
- Nobuto Okamoto as Suzume's father
- Kyusaku Shimada as Fukushima
- Masatō Ibu as Nakanishi

== Reception ==
Emma Slawinski of Eye for Film panned the film, writing "[Turtles Are Surprisingly Fast Swimmers] is a miscellany of characters, scenes and events that studiously avoids a plot", and "There are moments of wit and the odd thoughtful comment, but they turn into dead ends; the result is disappointingly ordinary". Conversely, Kevin Gilvear of DVD Times praised it in comparison to Satoshi Miki's directorial debut In the Pool by saying "[The film] retains the kind of skewed psychological underpinnings and energy that made the former so enjoyable" and that "...thanks to a sprightly and diverse cast playing a bunch of locals with unlikely talents that we can come away with a huge smile on our face".

== Release ==
Turtles Are Surprisingly Fast Swimmers was first released in Japan on July 2, 2005. The film was later released in South Korea on October 19, 2006. It also screened in the United Kingdom at the Raindance Film Festival on October 28, 2008, and in Taiwan on November 7, 2008.
