= Confessions (2010 film) =

2010 Japanese psychological thriller film by Tetsuya Nakashima

- Theatrical release poster
- Directed by: Tetsuya Nakashima
- Written by: Tetsuya Nakashima
- Based on: Confessions by Kanae Minato
- Produced by: Minami Ichikawa
- Starring: Takako Matsu
- Cinematography: Shôichi Atô (Note: Credited as Masakazu Ato.); Atsushi Ozawa
- Edited by: Yoshiyuki Koike
- Distributed by: Toho
- Release date: 5 June 2010 (Japan)
- Running time: 106 minutes
- Country: Japan
- Language: Japanese
- Box office: $45.2 million

Confessions (Japanese: 告白, Kokuhaku) is a 2010 Japanese psychological thriller film written and directed by Tetsuya Nakashima. An adaptation of Kanae Minato's 2008 novel of the same name, the film stars Takako Matsu as a grieving high school teacher who seeks revenge after her young daughter is found dead at the school under mysterious circumstances.

The film was a critical and commercial success, receiving widespread acclaim with particular praise for its direction, screenplay, performances, cinematography, and editing. It was awarded Best Picture at the 34th Japan Academy Prize and 53rd Blue Ribbon Awards, and was shortlisted at the 83rd Academy Awards for Best Foreign Language Film. It appeared on many lists of the year's 10 best films.

== Plot ==
When her HIV-positive husband became more ill, junior high school teacher Yuko Moriguchi began bringing their four-year-old daughter Manami to school with her. One day, Manami was found dead in the school's swimming pool. Some time later, Yuko calmly announces to her undisciplined and disrespectful students that she will resign before spring break, and reveals that two students in the class (whom she dubs "Student A" and "Student B") murdered Manami.

Yuko figures out who killed Manami by finding a small purse with a bunny mascot on it among Manami's belongings, leading her to question Naoki Shimomura (Student B). A flashback shows Yuko in a shop, where she tells Manami she cannot buy the purse as she has just bought a jacket featuring the same bunny mascot; Shuya Watanabe (Student A) sees her and loudly questions why Manami cannot have the purse, irking Yuko. Shuya later visits Yuko in the school's empty science lab and admits to killing Manami before rushing to jump out of a window, pretending that he is about to kill himself out of regret, but he then mocks Yuko's plea with him not to jump by saying "just kidding".

Yuko tells her class that she will not name the students who killed Manami for the same reason that she did not tell the police: the students are minors and thus unable to be arrested due to the Juvenile Law of 1947, a fact which also allows Shuya to continue taunting her about the murder. However, she tells the class how she figured out who committed the murder, and purposely makes it extremely easy for the other students to deduct that she is referring to Shuya and Naoki. She believes that her role as a teacher makes her responsible for teaching the boys a lesson by making them atone for their actions, and thus reveals that she injected their milk cartons with the HIV-positive blood of Manami's father. The other students react with panic and immediately move away from the boys. The rest of the film switches between the aftermath of Yuko's confession and the events before the confession via first-person narratives from Yuko, Shuya, Naoki, and the boys' classmate Mizuki Kitahara.

Naoki becomes a shut-in because he believes he has contracted HIV from the contaminated milk. His mother realizes he was involved in Manami's death and plans to commit murder-suicide to free them both from the shame, but he stabs her to death in the ensuing struggle and the police arrest him. It is revealed that he did not throw Manami's corpse into the pool to make her murder look accidental as previously claimed, but knew she was simply unconscious after Shuya's botched murder attempt and threw her in anyway. Shuya later explains that his mother abused him before abandoning the family to pursue a career in science, and her abandonment made him obsessed with scientific accomplishments and experiments, ranging from creating small inventions to documenting his murder and dissection of various animals. His first public invention, an electrified anti-mugging wallet, earned him a science fair award and made the local news; however, he was kept out of the headlines by a murder case in which a young girl poisoned her parents.

Shuya upgraded the anti-mugging wallet, decided to try it out on someone, and roped in Naoki to help. They decided to test the device, which had since been installed in the bunny purse, on Manami. However, it rendered her unconscious by the pool; Shuya mistook this as having killed Manami and walked away, proud of his achievement. Naoki then threw Manami into the pool, where she drowned, making him the real killer. Yuko comments on the irony of the situation, with Shuya failing to kill someone despite wanting to and Naoki killing someone despite claiming that he did not want to. Mizuki tells Shuya that she believes Yuko lied about the contaminated milk, as it was an implausible method of HIV transmission. She confesses to him that she identifies with the girl in the poisoning case, and the two become romantically involved, but he kills her and stores pieces of her body in his fridge after a confrontation over the abandonment complex caused by his mother.

Shuya receives an email from his mother, who says she wants to see him. He travels to the university where she works, expecting to reunite with her, only to discover that she has remarried and is away on her honeymoon. Believing she has forgotten him, he plants a bomb in his school during graduation and links it to his phone, aiming to kill himself and everyone else in the school during his speech. To his surprise, the bomb does not go off when he hits the button on his phone. He then receives a call from Yuko, who reveals that she faked the email from his mother and figured out his plan by watching the video manifesto he uploaded to his website. She subsequently relocated the bomb to the office of his mother, who just returned from her honeymoon. Yuko explains that this is her ultimate revenge: causing Shuya to kill his own mother. Shuya has a breakdown in the school assembly hall as Yuko arrives, telling him that his path to redemption can begin now that she has finally had her revenge, but she then laughs and says "just kidding".

== Cast ==
- Takako Matsu as Yuko Moriguchi
- Masaki Okada as Yoshiteru Terada (Werther)
- Yoshino Kimura as Yuko Shimomura
- Yukito Nishii as Shuya Watanabe
- Kaoru Fujiwara as Naoki Shimomura
- Ai Hashimoto as Mizuki Kitahara
- Mana Ashida as Manami Moriguchi

== Reception ==
=== Box office ===
Soon after the film had started showing in 266 cinemas, it had already grossed ¥269,835,200 with 194,893 audiences, breaking the record previously held by I Give My First Love to You. It kept grossing and became the highest-grossing film for four consecutive weeks in June. It grossed over ¥3.5 billion in the 8th screening week. The gross revenue finally reached a total of ¥3.85 billion in Japan. It is ranked as the 7th highest-grossing Japanese film in 2010. The film also grossed $2,625,175 overseas in other Asian countries, bringing the worldwide total to $45,203,103.

=== Critical response ===
Confessions received a widespread positive response globally, with critics praising a variety of factors including the faithfulness of the adaptation from the book, the writing and direction, and the performances (particularly by Matsu and the child actors). The film has an approval rating of 81% on review aggregator website Rotten Tomatoes, based on 16 reviews, and an average rating of 6.6/10. Seongyong Cho of RogerEbert.com called it a "gut-chilling Japanese thriller".

One of the few negative reviews came from British critic Mark Kermode, who said that the film's stylistic choices made it "virtually impenetrable on an emotional level".

In 2022, American filmmaker Michael Mann listed the film in his top 10 favorites for the Sight and Sound poll.

=== Awards and nominations ===
The film was selected as the Japanese entry for the Best Foreign Language Film at the 83rd Academy Awards. In January 2011, it made the January shortlist and advanced to the next round of voting. In Japan, it firstly won Best Film and Best Supporting Actress at the 53rd Blue Ribbon Awards, which is one of the most prestigious national cinema awards in Japan. Then, it won the awards for Best Film, Best Director, Best Screenplay and Best Editor at the 34th Japan Academy Prize. Also, it had six nominations in 5th Asian Film Awards, which is one of the films with most nominations (with Let the Bullets Fly).

In April, the film won Best Asian Film (similar to Best Foreign Language Film, though only Asian films which have been screened in Hong Kong are admitted to join) at the 30th Hong Kong Film Awards. At the 31st Hong Kong Film Awards, the category of Best Asian Film was replaced by a new category called Best Film of Mainland and Taiwan which means that only mainland Chinese and Taiwanese films can remain to compete for such an award. Therefore, Confessions has become the last winner of Best Asian Film.

List of accolades
Award / Film festival	Category	Recipient(s)	Result
14th Puchon International Fantastic Film Festival	Jury's Special Award	Confessions	Won
35th Hochi Film Awards	Best Director	Tetsuya Nakashima	Won
84th Kinema Junpo Best 10 Film Awards	Best Film	Confessions	2nd Place
53rd Blue Ribbon Awards	Best Picture	Confessions	Won
53rd Blue Ribbon Awards	Best Supporting Actress	Yoshino Kimura	Won
34th Japan Academy Film Prize	Best Picture	Confessions	Won
34th Japan Academy Film Prize	Best Director	Tetsuya Nakashima	Won
34th Japan Academy Film Prize	Best Screenplay	Tetsuya Nakashima	Won
34th Japan Academy Film Prize	Best Performance by an Actress in a Leading Role	Takako Matsu	Nominated
34th Japan Academy Film Prize	Best Performance by an Actor in a Supporting Role	Masaki Okada	Nominated
34th Japan Academy Film Prize	Best Performance by an Actress in a Supporting Role	Yoshino Kimura	Nominated
34th Japan Academy Film Prize	Best Cinematography	Masakazu Ato, Atsushi Ozawa	Nominated
34th Japan Academy Film Prize	Best Lighting Direction	Susumu Takakura	Nominated
34th Japan Academy Film Prize	Best Art Direction	Towako Kuwajima	Nominated
34th Japan Academy Film Prize	Best Sound Recording	Masato Yano	Nominated
34th Japan Academy Film Prize	Best Film Editing	Yoshiyuki Koike	Won
5th Asian Film Awards	Best Film	Confessions	Nominated
5th Asian Film Awards	Best Director	Tetsuya Nakashima	Nominated
5th Asian Film Awards	Best Actress	Takako Matsu	Nominated
5th Asian Film Awards	Best Supporting Actor	Masaki Okada	Nominated
5th Asian Film Awards	Best Supporting Actress	Yoshino Kimura	Nominated
5th Asian Film Awards	Best Film Editor	Yoshiyuki Koike	Nominated
83rd Academy Awards	Best Foreign Language Film	Confessions	Made January shortlist
30th Hong Kong Film Awards	Best Asian Film	Confessions	Won

== See also ==
- Cinema of Japan
- List of submissions to the 83rd Academy Awards for Best Foreign Language Film
- List of Japanese submissions for the Academy Award for Best Foreign Language Film
- Sasebo slashing
