= Kanae Minato =

Japanese writer (born 1973)

- Born: 1973 (age 52–53); Innoshima, Hiroshima, Japan
- Occupation: Writer
- Writing career
- Language: Japanese
- Period: 2007–present
- Genres: Crime fiction, thriller
- Notable awards: Japanese Booksellers Award (2009); Mystery Writers of Japan Award (2012)

Kanae Minato (湊かなえ, Minato Kanae; born 1973) is a Japanese writer of crime fiction and thrillers. She is a member of the Mystery Writers of Japan and the Honkaku Mystery Writers Club of Japan. She is a 2015 recipient of the Alex Awards.

== Life ==
She started writing in her thirties. Her first novel Confessions became a bestseller and won the Japanese Booksellers Award.

In youth she was an avid fan of mystery novels of Edogawa Ranpo, Maurice Leblanc, Agatha Christie, Keigo Higashino, Miyuki Miyabe and Yukito Ayatsuji.

She has been described in Japan as "the queen of iyamisu." Iyamisu (eww mystery) is a subgenre of mystery fiction which deals with grisly episodes and the dark side of human nature. The term was created in 2006 by the mystery critic Aoi Shimotsuki. There has been an iyamisu boom in Japan since around 2012. Kanae Minato, Mahokaru Numata and Yukiko Mari are regarded as representatives of the genre in Japan. The back cover blurb of the Japanese edition of Gone Girl, published in June 2013, was "One of the best iyamisu novels from overseas."

The English edition of Minato's Confessions, published in August 2014, was described by a critic as "the Gone Girl of Japan."

Wall Street Journal selected Confessions as one of the 10 best mysteries of 2014.

== Works in English translation ==
- Confessions (original title: Kokuhaku), trans. Stephen Snyder (Mulholland Books, 2014) ISBN 9780316200929, OCLC 883146317
- Penance (original title: Shokuzai), trans. Philip Gabriel (Mulholland Books, 2017) ISBN 9780316349154, OCLC 956626339

== Awards and nominations ==
Japanese Awards

- 2007 – Shosetsu Suiri New Writers Prize: "The Priest"
- 2009 – Japanese Booksellers Award: Confessions
- 2012 – Mystery Writers of Japan Award for Best Short Story: "Umi no Hoshi"

U.S. Awards

- 2015 – Alex Award: Confessions
- 2015 – Nominee for Strand Critics Award for Best First Novel: Confessions
- 2015 – Nominee for Shirley Jackson Award for Best Novel: Confessions

== Bibliography ==
=== Standalone novels ===
- Kokuhaku (告白), 2008 (Confessions)
- Shōjo (少女), 2009 (Girls)
- Shokuzai (贖罪), 2009 (Expiation)
- Enu no Tame ni (Nのために), 2010 (For N)
- Yakō Kanransha (夜行観覧車), 2010 (The Night Ferris Wheel)
- Hana no Kusari (花の鎖), 2011 (The Chain of Flowers)
- Kyōgū (境遇), 2011 (Circumstances)
- Shirayukihime Satsujin Jiken (白ゆき姫殺人事件), 2012 (The Snow White Murder Case)
- Bosei (母性), 2012 (Motherhood)
- Kōkō Nyūshi (高校入試), 2013 (An Entrance Examination for a High School)
- Mame no Ue de Nemuru (豆の上で眠る), 2014 (Sleep on a Bean)
- Yama Onna Nikki (山女日記), 2014 (Mountain Woman Diary)
- Monogatari no Owari (物語のおわり), 2014 (The End of the Story)
- Zesshō (絶唱), 2015
- Reverse (リバース), 2015 (Reverse)
- Utopia (ユートピア), 2015
- Mirai (未来), 2018 (Future)
- Broadcast (ブロードキャスト), 2018
- Rakujitsu (落日), 2019 (Sunset)
- Kakera (カケラ), 2020 (Fragment)
- Ningen Hyōhon (人間標本), 2023
- Akeboshi (暁星), 2025 (The Star at Dawn)

=== Short story collections ===
- Ōfuku Shokan (往復書簡), 2010 (Correspondence)
- Safaia (サファイア), 2012 (Sapphire)
- Bōkyō (望郷), 2013 (Thoughts of Home)
- Poison Daughter Holy Mother (ポイズンドーター・ホーリーマザー), 2016

== TV and film adaptations ==
Japanese films

- Confessions (2010)
- Kita no Kanaria tachi (2012) (Based on her short story Niju nen go no Shukudai 二十年後の宿題)
- The Snow White Murder Case (Shirayukihime Satsujin Jiken) (2014)
- Night's Tightrope (Shōjo) (2016)
- Bokyo (Based on her short story “夢の国 Yume no Kuni” Dreamland and “光の航 Hikari no koro” Light Route)(2017)
- Motherhood (2022)

Japanese TV Movies and Series

- Kyōgū (TV Movie) (2011)
- Penance (2012) (Shokuzai)
- Kōkō Nyūshi (TV Series) (2012)
- Yakō Kanransha (TV Series) (2013)
- Hana no Kusari (TV Movie) (2013)
- N no Tame ni (TV Series) (2014)
- Josei Sakka Mysteries Utsukushiki Mitsu no Uso (TV Movie 女性作家ミステリーズ 美しき三つの嘘 Only Episode 1 Based on her short story “Moonstone” from short story “Sapphire”) (2016)
- Bokyo TV Movie Special (Based on her short story “みかんの花 Mikan no hana” Orange Flowers, “海の星 Umi no hoshi” Sea Stars and “雲の糸 Kumo no ito” Cloud Thread)(2016)
- Ōfuku shokan ~ Junen go-nen-go no hōshu (TV Movie Based on her short story 往復書簡～十五年後の補習) (2016)
- Yamaonna Nikki ~ Onnatachi wa itadaki wo mezashite (TV Series 山女日記 ～女たちは頂きを目指して～) (2016)
- Reverse (TV Series) (2017)
- Poison Daughter Holy Mother (TV Series) (2019)
- Lupin the 3rd Part 6 (TV Anime Series) (2021)
- Sunset (TV Series) (2023)

== See also ==
- Japanese detective fiction
