= Tamatama =

Tamatama （たまたま）
- Film poster
- Directed by: Mayumi Komatsu
- Written by: Mayumi Komatsu
- Starring: Yū Aoi
- Release date: October 15, 2011
- Running time: 53 minutes
- Country: Japan
- Language: Japanese

Tamatama (たまたま, Chance) is a 2011 Japanese film, a drama directed by Mayumi Komatsu.

== Cast ==
- Yū Aoi
- Kaiji Moriyama
- Niamh Shaw
