= Yutaka Matsushige =

Japanese actor (born 1963)

- 松重 豊
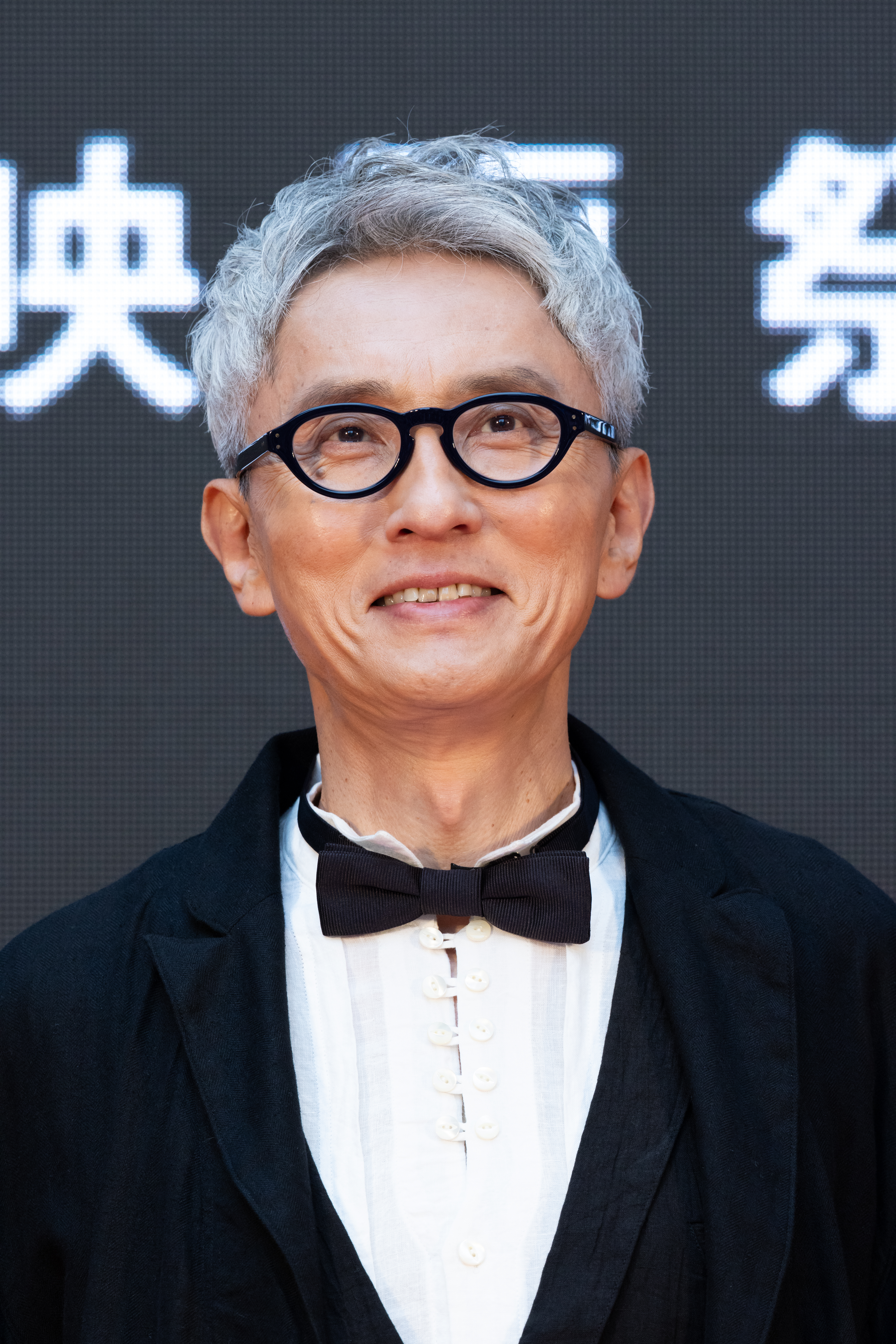
- Matsushige attending the 37th Tokyo International Film Festival in 2024
- Born: January 19, 1963 (age 63); Fukuoka, Fukuoka, Japan
- Occupation: Actor
- Years active: 1983–present

Yutaka Matsushige (松重 豊, Matsushige Yutaka; born January 19, 1963 in Fukuoka, Fukuoka Prefecture) is a Japanese actor.

== Career ==
Matsushige has appeared in the films such as EM Embalming, Adrenaline Drive, Last Life in the Universe, and Outrage Beyond.

He won the award for best supporting actor at the 31st Yokohama Film Festival for Dear Doctor in 2009.

Since 2012, he has starred in the television drama adaptation of the manga The Solitary Gourmet, and also co-wrote and directed its 2025 feature film version.

== Selected filmography ==
=== Film ===
Year	Film	Role	Notes	Ref
1992	The Guard from Underground			
1995	A Last Note	Daigoro		
1998	Ring	Yoshino		
1998	Spiral	Yoshino		
1999	Adrenaline Drive			
1999	Charisma	Nekoshima		
1999	Godzilla 2000			
1999	EM Embalming	Hiraoka		
2000	Eureka	Matsuoka		
2000	Monday	Masaki Kubo		
2001	Minna no Ie	Tall man		
2001	Red Shadow	Kamijou Takatora		
2001	The Princess Blade	Anka		
2002	Doing Time	Tall man		
2003	Last Life in the Universe	Yukio		
2003	Dragon Head			
2004	One Missed Call	Ichiro Fujieda		
2004	Blood and Bones	Nobuyoshi Ko		
2004	Lady Joker	Nishimura		
2005	Turtles Are Surprisingly Fast Swimmers	Ramen Chef		
2005	Shinobi: Heart Under Blade	Hattori Hanzō		
2006	Rough	Ami's father		
2006	Sun Scarred	Katsuya Ozaki		
2007	Like a Dragon	Makoto Date		
2007	The Insects Unlisted in the Encyclopedia	Mashima		
2007	Sukiyaki Western Django	Toshio		
2007	Adrift in Tokyo	Tomobe		
2007	Crows Zero	Ushiyama		
2008	Tokyo!			
2008	K-20: Legend of the Mask			
2009	Crows Zero 2	Ushiyama		
2009	Dear Doctor			
2010	Hanamizuki			
2010	The Lone Scalpel			
2010	Bayside Shakedown 3	Katsushige Mayuta		
2011	Phone Call to the Bar			
2012	Outrage Beyond	Shigeta		
2013	Real			
2013	The Love and Death of Kaoru Mitarai			
2013	Detective in the Bar			
2014	Seven Weeks	Haruhiko Suzuki		
2015	Miss Hokusai	Hokusai (voice)		
2015	Maestro!			
2016	Good Morning Show			
2016	Lost and Found			
2016	Museum	Kozo Sekihata		
2017	Outrage Coda	Detective Shigeta		
2017	The Last Shot in the Bar			
2018	Killing for the Prosecution	Suwabe		
2018	Dynamite Graffiti	Detective Morohashi		
2018	Love At Least	Isoyama		
2018	Cafe Funiculi Funicula			
2018	Flea-picking Samurai			
2019	Samurai Shifters			
2019	Kono Michi	Tekkan Yosano		
2019	The Hikita's Are Expecting!	Kunio Hikita	Lead role	
2020	Threads: Our Tapestry of Love	Tomita		
2020	Good-Bye			
2020	Our 30-Minute Sessions	Fujio Yoshii		
2020	The Voice of Sin	Yōsuke Mizushima		
2020	Independence of Japan	Fumimaro Konoe		
2021	What Happened to Our Nest Egg!?	Akira Gotō		
2021	The Supporting Actors: The Movie	Himself		
2021	Inu-Oh	Tomona's Father (voice)		
2022	The Confidence Man JP: Episode of the Hero	Tanba		
2022	What to Do with the Dead Kaiju?	Noboru Yamikumo		
2022	The Last 10 Years	Matsuri's father		
2022	Tsuyukusa	Gorō Shinoda		
2022	Drive into Night	Kim		
2023	Familia	Aoki		
2023	Dreaming in Between	Ishida		
2024	18×2 Beyond Youthful Days	Nakazato	Taiwanese-Japanese film	
2024	Last Mile	Yasuo Kamikura		
2024	Cloud			
2024	Faceless			
2025	The Solitary Gourmet	Gorō Inogashira	Lead role and director	
2025	Scarlet	Cornelius (voice)		
2026	Bayside Shakedown: N.E.W	Katsushige Mayuta		

=== Television ===
Year	Title	Role	Notes	Ref
1997	Mōri Motonari	Kikkawa Motoharu	Taiga drama	
2001	Hojo Tokimune	Sha Taro	Taiga drama	
2007	Byakkotai	Yamamoto Kakuma	Miniseries	
2009–2014	Midnight Diner	Ryu Kenzaki	3 seasons	
2012–2022	Solitary Gourmet	Gorō Inogashira	Lead role; 10 seasons	
2012	Man of Destiny	Shuichi Tsukasa		
2013	Yae's Sakura	Yamamoto Gonpachi	Taiga drama	
2014	Ashita, Mama ga Inai	Kawashima		
2014	Shinigami-kun	Shunin		
2014	Hero	Kenzaburō Kawajiri	Season 2	
2014	Zainin no Uso	Kazuya Kamoshita	Miniseries	
2015	Dr. Rintarō	Eisuke Hasumi		
2015	Death Note	Sōichirō Yagami		
2016	Sleepeeer Hit!	Yasuki Wada		
2016	Totto TV	Wang-san		
2016	Mikaiketsu Jiken: File. 05	Yūsuke Yoshinaga	Docudrama	
2017	Hagoku	Ōtasaka	Television film	
2017	The Aristocrat Detective	Yamamoto		
2017	Tsuribaka Nisshi	Gorō Inogashira	Season 2	
2017	Akira and Akira	Kōzō Yamazaki		
2017–2021	The Supporting Actors	Himself	Lead role; 3 seasons	
2018	Unnatural	Yasuo Kamikura		
2019	Ieyasu, Edo wo Tateru	Ina Tadatsugu	Miniseries	
2019	Shiroi Kyotō	Professor Ugai	Miniseries	
2019	Idaten	Ryotaro Azuma	Taiga drama	
2020	Ashita no Kazoku	Shunsaku	Television film	
2021	Bullets, Bones and Blocked Noses	Ryūmon	Miniseries	
2021–2022	Come Come Everybody	Kyomuzō Ban	Asadora	
2022	A Day-Off of Ryunosuke Kamiki		Episode 6	
2023	What Will You Do, Ieyasu?	Ishikawa Kazumasa	Taiga drama	
2025	K-foodie meets J-foodie	Himself	Netflix original food show	

=== Japanese dub ===
Year	Title	Role	Ref
2016	The Good Dinosaur	Butch	
2019	How to Train Your Dragon: The Hidden World	Grimmel the Grisly	
