= Yū Aoi =

Japanese actress and model (born 1985)

- 蒼井 優
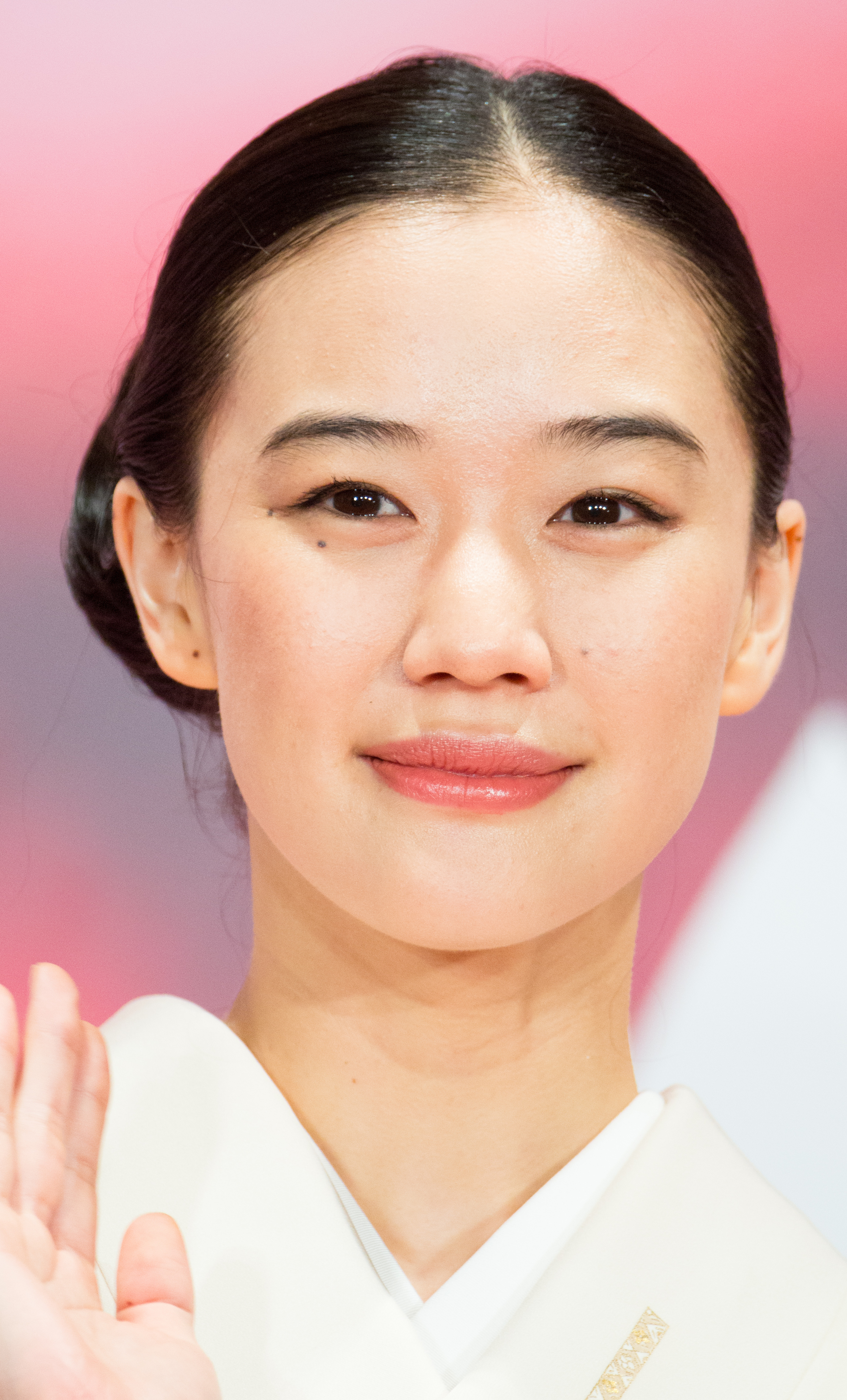
- Aoi at the 2017 Tokyo International Film Festival
- Born: Yū Natsui; August 17, 1985 (age 41); Kasuga, Fukuoka, Japan
- Other name: Yu Yamasato (after marriage)
- Occupations: Actress; model
- Years active: 1999–present
- Agent: Itoh Co.
- Spouse: Ryota Yamasato (m. 2019)
- Children: 1
- Website: itoh-c.com/artist/aoi

Yu Aoi (蒼井 優, Aoi Yū; born August 17, 1985) is a Japanese actress and model. She made her film debut as Shiori Tsuda in Shunji Iwai's 2001 film All About Lily Chou-Chou. She subsequently portrayed Tetsuko Arisugawa in Hana and Alice (2004), also directed by Iwai, Kimiko Tanigawa in the hula dancing film Hula Girls and Hagumi Hanamoto in the 2006 live-action adaptation of the Honey and Clover manga series.

She has won numerous awards for her performances on screen, including the Japan Academy Prize and Kinema Junpo Awards for best supporting actress in 2007 for Hula Girls and Rookie of the Year for continued performances in the field of Films in Media and Fine Arts by the Ministry of Education, Culture, Sports, Science and Technology of Japan in 2009.

== Early life ==
Aoi was born on August 17, 1985, in Fukuoka Prefecture, Japan. She moved to Tokyo in junior high school and lived in Kasai, Edogawa ward.

== Career ==
=== Early career ===
Yu Aoi made her stage debut as Polly in the 1999 rendition of Annie, followed by her appearance as a regular on TV Tokyo's Oha Suta (The Super Kids Station) in 2000. A year later, she debuted in Shunji Iwai's All About Lily Chou-Chou playing Shiori Tsuda alongside Hayato Ichihara, Shugo Oshinari, Miwako Ichikawa, and Ayumi Ito. Aoi would later work in Ao to Shiro de Mizuiro and Gaichu with friend Aoi Miyazaki. With her first roles on the small and big screen came TV commercials and endorsements for Sony, Yamaha, DoCoMo, Toshiba and Coca-Cola.

In 2003, commemorating the 30th anniversary of Kit Kat in Japan, Shunji Iwai shot a series of short films starring Yu Aoi and Anne Suzuki, which later was expanded into the feature film called Hana & Alice, which earned Aoi the Best Actress award at the Japanese Professional Movie Award.

=== 2005–2007 ===
In 2005, Aoi played her first lead on the big screen in Letters from Kanai Nirai, which was sold in Korea with the alternate title of Aoi Yu's Letter due to her popularity. She also had supporting roles in the Satoshi Miki film Turtles Swim Faster than Expected starring Juri Ueno, and Yamato with Shido Nakamura and Kenichi Matsuyama. This supporting role would earn her one of her double-nomination as Best Supporting Actress at the 2007 Japanese Academy Award. She won against herself for her work as Kimiko Tanikawa in the Japanese hit Hula Girls, which was sent to the Academy Awards as the Japanese official selection that year.

To this date, her role as the hula dancing girl from small town Iwaki remains her most successful role yet, earning her a dozen awards as Best Actress and Best Supporting Actress, alongside her other smaller roles that year as Hagu in Honey & Clover, and Kana Sato in the Shunji-Iwai-produced and Nirai-Kanai-directed Rainbow Song. Aoi also lent her voice to play Shiro in the animated film Tekkon Kinkreet, the adaptation to the Taiyō Matsumoto manga, Black and White, directed by Michael Arias.

During these years, she made commercials for Nintendo, Canon, Shiseido Cosmetics, Shueisha Publishing, Kirin Beverage and continued endorsing DoCoMo. Aoi also released two photobooks with Yoko Takahashi as photographer, and distributed by Rockin'on: Travel Sand in 2005 and Dandelion in 2007.

In 2007, she participated in the live-action adaptation of the manga series Mushishi alongside Joe Odagiri, as well as WOWOW's Don't Laugh at My Romance, Welcome to the Quiet Room with Yuki Uchida, and going back to the stage to play Desdemona in a rendition of Shakespeare's Othello. For these last two roles, Aoi lost 7 kg for her role as eating disorder patient, Miki.

=== 2008–present ===
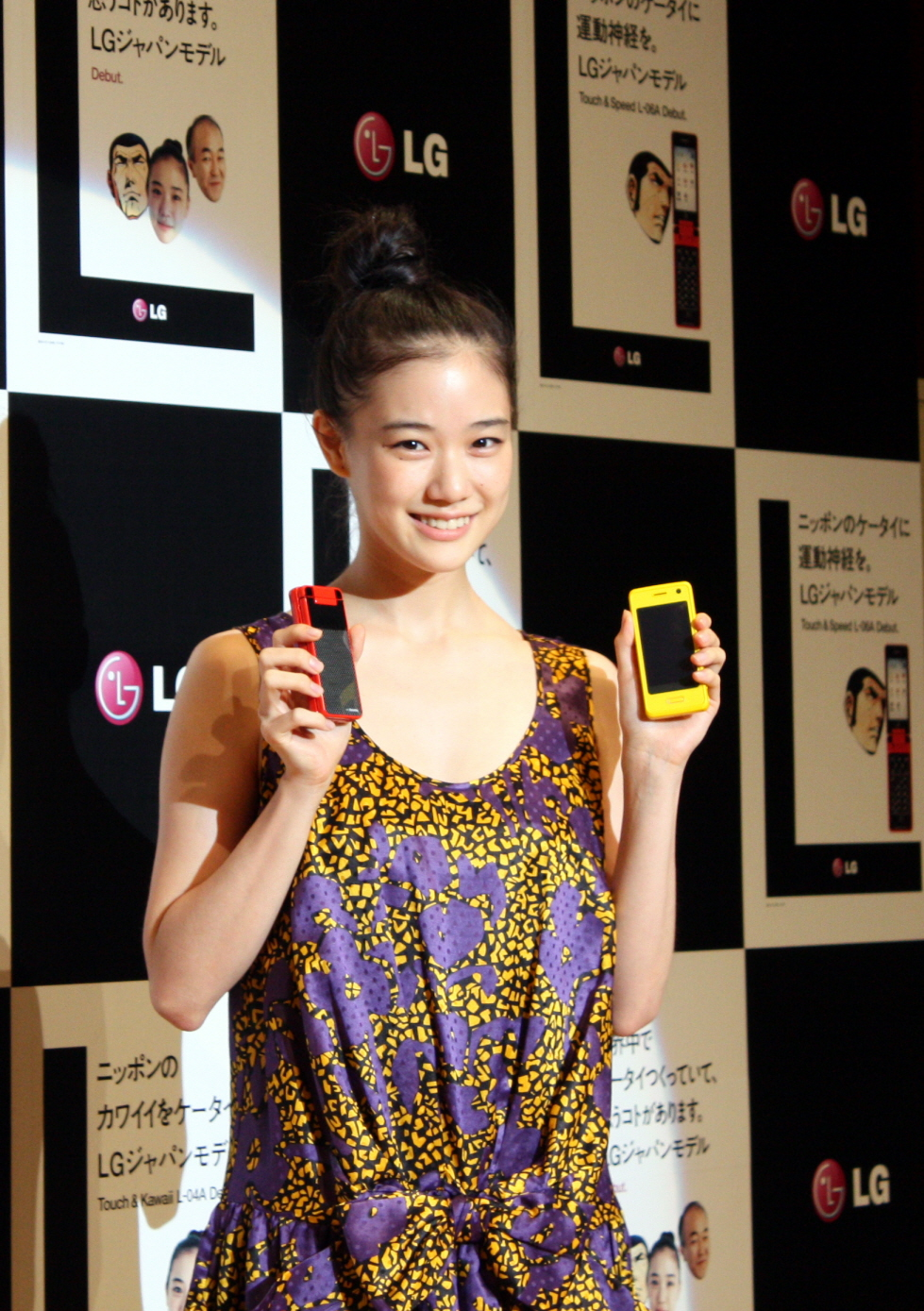
Yu Aoi at the LG exhibition fair in 2009

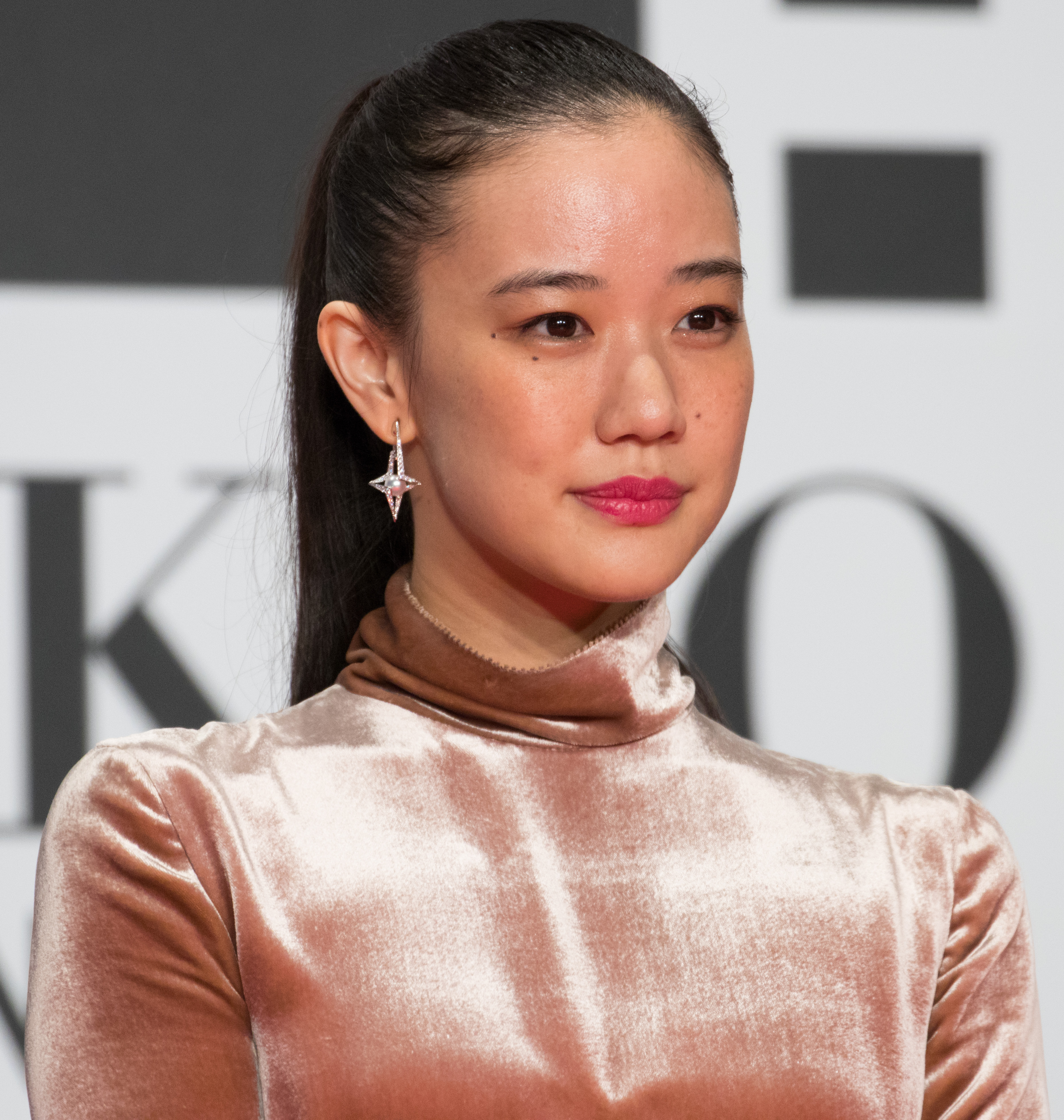
Yu Aoi at the 2016 Tokyo International Film Festival

Aoi began 2008 with the release of Don't Laugh at My Romance, which earned her a nomination as Best Supporting Actress at the Asian Film Awards 2009. She appeared in the experimental drama Camouflage (aka. Aoi Yu x 4 Lies), in which she collaborated with four different directors exploring the theme of lies. The series lasted for 12 episodes, and included work with Ryō Kase, Yoichi Nukumizu, Shoko Ikezu, Nobuhiro Yamashita, and Yuki Tanada.

A couple of months later, NTV signed Aoi to play her first TV leading role as Handa Sen in the live-action adaptation of Shota Kikuchi's manga series Osen, which aired until the end of June with ten episodes.

Next, Aoi released One Million Yen Girl written and directed by Camouflage director Yuki Tanada, and also released by WOWOW. This was her latest leading film role since Nirai Kanai in 2005. She briefly participated in the Japanese World-War-II-jury-themed film Best Wishes for Tomorrow, as well as the international Tokyo! - a three-short-film collection by Michel Gondry, Leos Carax, and Bong Joon Ho.

In 2009, The Ministry of Education, Culture, Sports, Science and Technology of Japan named Yu Aoi Rookie of the Year in the field of Films in Media and Fine Arts, citing her work in her film debut in All About Lily Chou Chou, until her work in One Million Yen Girl. Later that year, Aoi provided the voice of Ikechan in the film Ikechan and Me, a live-action adaptation of the picture book of the same name by Rieko Saibara, as well as playing supporting roles in Honokaa Boy and Yoji Yamada's Ototo. The following year Aoi starred in Ryūichi Hiroki's 2010 film The Lightning Tree. She later appeared in Vampire, Rurouni Kenshin, and Kiyoshi Kurosawa's 2012 television drama Penance.

== Personal life ==
Aoi married comedian Ryota Yamasato on June 3, 2019. On February 10, 2022, they announced that she was pregnant with their first child and due in the summer. On August 10, 2022, Yamasato revealed that Aoi had given birth to their daughter.

== Filmography ==
=== Film ===
Year	Title	Role	Notes	Ref(s)
2001	All About Lily Chou-Chou	Shiori Tsuda		
2002	Kinema Tōri no Hitobito	Hikari		
2002	Harmful Insect	Natsuko Yamaoka		
2002	Hashire! Kettamashin: Wedding Kyosō Kyoku	Lead	Musical	
2003	Worst by Chance	Harada's girlfriend		
2003	1980	Rika Hashiba		
2004	Hana and Alice	Tetsuko "Alice" Arisugawa	Lead role	
2004	Mask de 41	Haruka Kuramochi		
2004	Sea Cat	Miya Noda		
2005	Tetsujin 28: The Movie	Mami Tachibana		
2005	Turtles Swim Faster Than Expected	Kujaku Ogitani		
2005	Letters from Nirai Kanai	Fuki Asato	Lead role	
2005	Shining Boy & Little Randy	Emi Murakami		
2005	Henshin	Kei Hamura		
2005	Jukai	Harumi		
2005	Yamato	Taeko		
2006	Honey and Clover	Hagumi Hanamoto		
2006	Hula Girls	Kimiko Tanikawa		
2006	Tekkon Kinkreet	White (voice)		
2006	Rainbow Song	Kana Sato		
2006	Sugar and Spice		Cameo	
2007	Mushishi	Tanyu		
2007	Welcome to the Quiet Room	Miki		
2008	Sex Is No Laughing Matter	En-Chan		
2008	Best Wishes for Tomorrow	Kazuko Moribe		
2008	One Million Yen Girl	Suzuko Sato	Lead role	
2008	Tokyo!	Pizza delivery girl	Segment Shaking Tokyo	
2009	Honokaa Boy	Kaoru		
2009	Good Bye, My Secret Friend	Ikechan (voice)		
2010	About Her Brother	Koharu Takano		
2010	Flowers	Rin	Lead role	
2010	The Lightning Tree	Yū	Lead role	
2010	Redline	Sonoshee (voice)		
2011	Patisserie Coin de rue	Natsume Usuba	Lead role	
2011	Vampire	Mina		
2011	By Chance	Traveler	Lead role	
2012	Fukushima Hula Girls	Narration		
2012	Rurouni Kenshin	Megumi Takani		
2013	Tokyo Family	Noriko Mamiya		
2013	Space Pirate Captain Harlock	Miime (voice)		
2014	Rurouni Kenshin: Kyoto Inferno	Megumi Takani		
2014	Rurouni Kenshin: The Legend Ends	Megumi Takani		
2014	Climbing to Spring	Ai Takazawa		
2015	The Case of Hana & Alice	Tetsuko "Alice" Arisugawa (voice)	Lead role	
2015	Journey to the Shore	Tomoko		
2016	Over the Fence	Satoshi Tamura		
2016	Japanese Girls Never Die	Haruko Azumi	Lead role	
2016	What a Wonderful Family!	Noriko Mamiya		
2017	What a Wonderful Family! 2	Noriko Hirata		
2017	Tokyo Ghoul	Rize Kamishiro		
2017	Mixed Doubles	Yo		
2017	Birds Without Names	Towako	Lead role	
2018	What a Wonderful Family! 3: My Wife, My Life	Noriko Hirata		
2018	Penguin Highway	Lady (voice)		
2018	Killing	Yū		
2019	Miyamoto	Yasuko Nakano		
2019	A Long Goodbye	Fumi Higashi	Lead role	
2019	Children of the Sea	Ruka's mother (voice)		
2019	They Say Nothing Stays the Same	A geisha		
2020	Romance Doll	Sonoko	Lead role	
2020	Ora, Ora Be Goin' Alone	Young Momoko		
2020	Wife of a Spy	Satoko Fukuhara	Lead role	
2021	Rurouni Kenshin: The Final	Megumi Takani		
2022	Dr. Coto's Clinic 2022	Mina Nakai	Cameo	
2023	Sylvanian Families the Movie: A Gift from Freya	Teri Chocolate (voice)		
2025	Soreike! Anpanman: Chapon no Hero!	Chapon (voice)		
2025	How Dare You?	Keiko		
2025	Meets the World	Yuki		
2025	Tokyo Taxi	Sumire (young)		
2027	In My Father's Room	Satomi Hashima	Lead role	

=== Television ===
Year	Title	Role	Notes	Ref(s)
2001	Ao to Shiro to Mizuiro	Kimiko Shiina	TV movie	
2002	Ukiwa - Shōnen-tachi no Natsu	Miyuki Yamashita	TV movie	
2002	Shin Zukkoke Sanningumi	Megumi		
2003	High School Teacher	Mami Ezawa		
2003	Engimono	Koyomi	Mini-series	
2003	14 Months	17-year-old Yūko Igarashi		
2004	Ichiban Taisetsu na Dēto Tokyo no Sora- Shanghai no Yume	Kaori		
2004	Yo ni mo Kimyō na Monogatari: Kako kara no Nikki	Yurie Kotajima	Short drama	
2004	Nanako and Nanao: The Day They Became Sister and Brother	Nanako	Lead role; TV movie	
2005	Tiger & Dragon	Risa		
2005	Twenty-Four Eyes	Kotoe Katagiri	TV movie	
2005	Trilogia: Bitter Sweet	Sayaka	Lead role; short drama	
2006	Dr. Coto's Clinic 2006	Mina Nakai		
2008	Camouflage	Chika / Makoto/ Umeko / Suzuko	Lead role	
2008	Osen	Sen Handa	Lead role	
2010	Ryōmaden	Omoto	Taiga drama	
2012	Penance	Sae Kikuchi	Mini-series	
2013	Galileo Season 2	Atsuko Kanbara	Episode 8	
2013	Mottomo Tooi Ginga	Akane	Mini-series	
2014	Mozu Season 2	Shiori Nanami		
2014	All About My Siblings	Azusa		
2015	Stitch! Perfect Memory	Tila-3000 (voice)	TV special	
2017	Dr. Rintarō	Yumeno		
2017	Hello, Detective Hedgehog	Setsuko Kawai		
2018	Miyamoto kara Kimi e	Yasuko Nakano		
2020	Wife of a Spy	Satoko Fukuhara	Lead role; TV movie	
2021	Shikatanakatta to Iute wa Ikan no desu	Fusako Torii	TV movie	
2023	Boogie Woogie	Reiko Yamato	Asadora	
2025	Asura	Takiko	Lead role	
2026	Human Vapor	Kyoko Kono	Lead role	
2026	Until the T-shirt Dries	Sakiko	Lead role	

=== Stage ===
- Zipang Punk: Goemon Rock III (2014), Silver Cat Eyes

== Awards and nominations ==
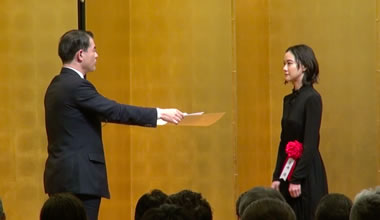
Aoi receiving the New Artist Award from the Arts Encouragement Prize in 2019

Year	Award	Category	Work(s)	Result	Ref.
2005	14th Japan Film Professional Awards	Best Actress	Hana and Alice	Won	
2006	31st Hochi Film Awards	Best Supporting Actress	Hula Girls, Honey and Clover	Won	
2006	19th Nikkan Sports Film Awards	Best Newcomer	Hula Girls	Won	
2007	26th Zenkoku Eiren Awards	Best Supporting Actress	Hula Girls	Won	
2007	31st Elan d'or Awards	Newcomer of the Year	Herself	Won	
2007	61st Mainichi Film Awards	Best Supporting Actress	Hula Girls, Rainbow Song, Honey and Clover	Won	
2007	80th Kinema Junpo Awards	Best Supporting Actress	Hula Girls, Rainbow Song, Honey and Clover	Won	
2007	49th Blue Ribbon Awards	Best Actress	Hula Girls, Honey and Clover	Won	
2007	28th Yokohama Film Festival	Best Actress	Hula Girls, Honey and Clover	Won	
2007	30th Japan Academy Film Prize	Best Supporting Actress	Hula Girls	Won	
2007	30th Japan Academy Film Prize	Best Supporting Actress	Yamato	Nominated	
2007	30th Japan Academy Film Prize	Newcomer of the Year	Hula Girls	Won	
2009	3rd Asian Film Awards	Best Supporting Actress	Don't Laugh at My Romance	Nominated	
2010	23rd Nikkan Sports Film Awards	Best Supporting Actress	About Her Brother	Won	
2011	34th Japan Academy Film Prize	Best Supporting Actress	About Her Brother	Nominated	
2011	5th Asian Film Awards	Best Supporting Actress	About Her Brother	Nominated	
2014	37th Japan Academy Film Prize	Best Supporting Actress	Tokyo Family	Nominated	
2014	8th Asian Film Awards	Best Supporting Actress	Tokyo Family	Nominated	
2017	42nd Hochi Film Awards	Best Actress	Birds Without Names	Won	
2017	30th Nikkan Sports Film Awards	Best Actress	Birds Without Names	Won	
2018	39th Yokohama Film Festival	Best Actress	Birds Without Names	Won	
2018	60th Blue Ribbon Awards	Best Actress	Birds Without Names	Nominated	
2018	41st Japan Academy Film Prize	Best Actress	Birds Without Names	Won	
2018	91st Kinema Junpo Awards	Best Actress	Birds Without Names	Won	
2018	12th Osaka Cinema Festival	Best Actress	Birds Without Names	Won	
2018	12th Asian Film Awards	Best Actress	Birds Without Names	Nominated	
2019	32nd Nikkan Sports Film Awards	Best Actress	A Long Goodbye, Miyamoto	Nominated	
2020	Elle Cinema Awards 2020	Elle Best Actress	Wife of a Spy and others	Won	
2020	74th Mainichi Film Awards	Best Actress	Miyamoto	Nominated	
2020	74th Mainichi Film Awards	Kinuyo Tanaka Award	Herself	Nominated	
2020	62nd Blue Ribbon Awards	Best Actress	A Long Goodbye	Nominated	
2020	33rd Nikkan Sports Film Awards	Best Actress	Wife of a Spy	Nominated	
2021	40th Zenkoku Eiren Awards	Best Actress	Wife of a Spy	Won	
2021	75th Mainichi Film Awards	Best Actress	Wife of a Spy	Nominated	
2021	63rd Blue Ribbon Awards	Best Actress	Wife of a Spy	Nominated	
2021	15th Asian Film Awards	Best Actress	Wife of a Spy	Won	
2026	49th Japan Academy Film Prize	Best Supporting Actress	Tokyo Taxi	Nominated	
