= Household X =

- DVD cover
- Directed by: Kōki Yoshida
- Written by: Kōki Yoshida
- Produced by: Mayumi Amano
- Starring: Kaho Minami; Tomorowo Taguchi; Tomohiro Kaku
- Cinematography: Takayuki Shida
- Edited by: Ryō Hayano; Kōki Yoshida
- Music by: Hiroko Sebu
- Release dates: July 29, 2010 (Pia Film Festival); September 24, 2011 (Japan)
- Running time: 90 minutes
- Country: Japan
- Language: Japanese

Household X (Japanese: 家族X, Hepburn: Kazoku X), also known as Family X, is a 2010 Japanese film directed by Kōki Yoshida. It was shown at the Forum section of the 61st Berlin International Film Festival.

== Cast ==
- Kaho Minami
- Tomorowo Taguchi
- Tomohiro Kaku
