= Anne Suzuki =

Japanese actress (born 1987)

- 鈴木 杏
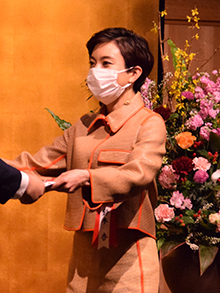
- Suzuki at an award ceremony in 2021
- Born: April 27, 1987 (age 39); Setagaya, Tokyo, Japan
- Occupation: Actress
- Years active: 1995–present

Anne Suzuki (鈴木 杏, Suzuki An; born April 27, 1987) is a Japanese actress.

== Career ==
Suzuki co-starred in Shunji Iwai's Hana and Alice with Yū Aoi. She voiced the title character Ray Steam in Katsuhiro Otomo's animated film Steamboy.

Suzuki played a supporting role in Andrew Lau and Alan Mak's Initial D, a film based on the Japanese comic series. She co-starred in Ryuichi Hiroki's yakuza film The Egoists with Kengo Kora.

Suzuki has also appeared in films such as Takashi Yamazaki's Returner (2002), Takahisa Zeze's Moon Child (2003), and Yoshimitsu Morita's Tsubaki Sanjuro (2007).

She previously mentioned that she expressed interest, for a collaboration with Emily Blunt and Felicity Jones.

== Filmography ==
=== Film ===
- Snow Falling on Cedars (1999), Young Hatsue Imada
- Juvenile (2000)
- Pokémon 4Ever (2001) Miku (Diana in the English dub)
- Returner (2002) – Milly
- Moon Child (2003)
- The Blue Light (2003)
- 9 Souls (2003)
- Steamboy (2004) – Ray Steam (voice)
- Hana and Alice (2004), Hana Arai
- Initial D (2005), Natsuki Mogi
- Hanging Garden (2005)
- Tsubaki Sanjuro (2007)
- Glory to the Filmmaker! (2007)
- Kissho Tennyo (2007)
- Himizu (2011)
- Mahoro Ekimae Tada Benriken (2011)
- The Egoists (2011), Michiko
- Helter Skelter (2012)
- The Ravine of Goodbye (2013)
- The Case of Hana & Alice (2015), Hana Arai (voice)
- Ashita ni Kakeru Hashi (2018), Miyuki
- Ride or Die (2021), Yu Nagasawa
- Yokaipedia (2022), Itsuki's mother
- All That Exists (2027), Hitomi Naito

=== Television ===
- Lost Man Found (2022), Hitachi
- Ōoku: The Inner Chambers (2023), Hiraga Gennai
- What Will You Do, Ieyasu? (2023), Ohatsu
- The Hot Spot (2025), Hazuki Nakamura
