= The Case of Hana & Alice =

Japanese anime film

- Film poster
- Directed by: Shunji Iwai
- Written by: Shunji Iwai
- Produced by: Shunji Iwai; Tomohiko Ishii
- Starring: Yū Aoi; Anne Suzuki
- Cinematography: Chigi Kanbe
- Edited by: Shunji Iwai
- Music by: Shunji Iwai; Hekuto Pascal
- Production companies: Steve N' Steven (animation); Rockwell Eyes (production)
- Release date: February 20, 2015 (Japan)
- Running time: 99 minutes
- Country: Japan
- Language: Japanese

The Case of Hana & Alice (Japanese: 花とアリス殺人事件, Hepburn: Hana to Arisu Satsujin Jiken; lit. "Hana and Alice's Murder Case") is a Japanese rotoscoped youth drama film written, directed, edited, co-scored and co-produced by Shunji Iwai. It is the prequel to Iwai's 2004 live-action film Hana and Alice. The film was released on February 20, 2015. A manga adaptation by Dowman Sayman was serialized on Shogakukan's Yawaraka Spirits web magazine from February 16 to July 27, 2015.

== Plot ==
Fourteen-year-old Tetsuko "Alice" Arisugawa moves into the neighborhood of Fujiko with her divorced mother. While moving into her new home, Alice notices a girl her age spying on her from the neighboring house, and finds a stash of tests with bad grades in her own bedroom closet. At her new school, her teacher, Ms. Ogino, assigns her one of two desks that strangely do not get dusted, and that sit on top of letters written on the floor. Her fellow students keep talking about an evil spirit named Judas with "four wives". A heavily made-up student named Mutsu "Moo" Mutsumi accuses her of releasing the spirit, and leads the class in an elaborate ceremony to reseal it.

Later on, Moo admits to Alice that she was playacting. The previous year's class had a story of a boy named Judas that had four wives until one killed him via anaphylaxis. Moo originally sat in Judas's desk and was teased for it, but she thwarted the bullying by embracing the story, pretending to have been possessed by and then freed from Judas, and changing her look to resemble a witch. Moo notes that the only remaining student with firsthand knowledge of the story is Hana Arai, who has been held back because she was absent too often. At home, Alice looks closer at the tests and finds they belong to "Kotaro Yuda". She realizes that Yuda is the "Judas" from the story, and that Hana is the girl from next door.

Alice sneaks into Hana's house and confronts her about the story. Hana tells her she does not know if Kotaro Yuda is really dead. But she knows Kotaro's father, and drafts Alice into a plan to trick him into revealing Kotaro's fate. The next day, Alice goes to the corporation where Kotaro's father works, but botches the plan, spending the day with one of his coworkers instead. She eventually catches up to Hana, who knows where the Yudas live. They spy on the home, waiting for Kotaro, but lose track of time and miss the last train home. They take shelter underneath a truck, and Hana tells the whole truth to Alice: Kotaro had been a long time crush of Hana's. Hana would always give him a Kit Kat bar for Valentine's Day, but Kotaro never reciprocated. The previous year, Hana had given him a made-up marriage certificate to show her feelings for him, but Kotaro then went on to hand out his own marriage certificates to other girls in the class. An angry Hana then stuck a bee down Kotaro's shirt. Right when Kotaro announced to the class that he was moving away, the bee stung him, leaving him writhing in pain on the floor. Hana overheard students speculate that Kotaro could die of anaphylactic shock, and the fear that she might have killed him drove her to stop going to school.

The next morning Hana wakes up early to continue spying. Alice barely avoids getting run over by the truck she was sleeping under, but panics when she mistakenly believes Hana is still stuck on the bottom of the truck. In the ensuing confusion, Hana and Alice run into Kotaro Yuda, apparently fine. Alice forces Hana to confront Kotaro, who tells her that he knew she put that bee in his shirt, and will never forget the pain. Hana takes comfort in Kotaro's words as an indication that he loves her.

Days later, Alice's new school uniform arrives, and Hana feels able to put her old uniform on and return to school.

== Voice cast ==
- Yū Aoi as Tetsuko "Alice" Arisugawa (有栖川 徹子 Arisugawa Tetsuko, アリス Arisu)
- Anne Suzuki as Hana Arai (荒井 花 Arai Hana)
- Ryo Katsuji as Kotaro Yuda (湯田光太郎 Yuda Kōtarō)
- Haru Kuroki as Ogino Satomi
- Tae Kimura as Yuki Sakaki (ballet teacher)
- Sei Hiraizumi as Kenji Kuroyanagi (黒柳健次 Kuroyanagi Kenji) (Alice's father)
- Shoko Aida as Kayo Arisugawa (有栖川 加代 Arisugawa Kayo) (Alice's mother)
- Ranran Suzuki as Mutsu Mutsumi
- Tomohiro Kaku as Tomonaga (朝長先生 Tomonaga-sensei)
- Midoriko Kimura as Tomomi Arai (荒井友美 Arai Tomomi) (Hana's mother)

== Release ==
The film was licensed and released direct-to-video in the United Kingdom and Ireland by Anime Limited in Japanese with English subtitles and in the United States and Canada by GKIDS.

== Reception ==
Andrew Osmond of Anime News Network gave the film an overall grade of B+ and said that "despite its aesthetic issues and a meandering start, Hana & Alice is a highly likable film about hugely likable teens."

The film won the Bronze Audience Award for best animated feature film at the 19th Fantasia International Film Festival.
