= Hana and Alice =

Hana & Alice
- Film poster
- Directed by: Shunji Iwai
- Written by: Shunji Iwai
- Produced by: Shunji Iwai
- Starring: Anne Suzuki; Yū Aoi; Tomohiro Kaku
- Cinematography: Noboru Shinoda
- Edited by: Shunji Iwai
- Music by: Shunji Iwai
- Production company: Rockwell Eyes
- Distributed by: Toho
- Release date: March 13, 2004 (Japan)
- Running time: 135 minutes
- Country: Japan

Hana and Alice (Japanese: 花とアリス, Hepburn: Hana to Arisu) is a 2004 Japanese teen romance film by director Shunji Iwai. The film, shot on HD digital video by the director of photography, Noboru Shinoda, who shared a longstanding working relationship with Shunji Iwai, concerns the life of two girls, the titular Hana (Anne Suzuki) and Alice (Yū Aoi), and the stress placed on their friendship as they move into high school.

It was theatrical released in Japan in 2004. It moved into theaters in other Asian territories later in 2004 and 2005, and into western film festivals, such as New York Asian Film Festival and Seattle International Film Festival.

== Plot ==
Yū Aoi dancing in Hana and Alice

When Alice develops a crush on a stranger at the train station, she offers her best friend, Hana, the stranger's "half brother," Masashi. Hana declines, but after watching Masashi from a distance, she develops feelings for him. She stalks him by travelling on his regular train throughout the winter.

During the spring, Hana and Alice enroll at Masashi's high school. Hana learns that Masashi is a member of the story-telling club, which prompts her to join. As she continues to track him secretly, she witnesses him crash into a garage door, which leaves him unconscious. As he awakes, he finds Hana leaning over him. She reveals that a blow to Masashi's head has given him a case of amnesia and that she is his girlfriend. Hana and Masashi soon hang out as a couple while she continues deceiving him about their relationship. Alice becomes involved with Hana's lies by pretending she is Masashi's ex-girlfriend. Alice, in the meanwhile, gets scouted for a modelling job and succeeds in getting in. She also tries to reconnect with her father.

Through a series of events, a love triangle unexpectedly develops between Hana, Alice and Masashi, when Masashi falls in love with Alice, who he still believes is his ex. Masashi eventually learns of Hana's lie about his amnesia and reacts accordingly, which tests Hana and Alice's friendship. Alice proceeds to audition for a modelling job for the front page of a magazine cover. To prove her worth, she performs a ballet routine that impresses the casting director. The final shot finds Hana and Alice giggling at Alice's front cover photo.

== Cast ==
- Anne Suzuki - Hana Arai (荒井 花 Arai Hana)
- Yū Aoi - Tetsuko "Alice" Arisugawa (有栖川 徹子 Arisugawa Tetsuko, アリス Arisu)
- Tomohiro Kaku - Masashi "Mr. Miya" Miyamoto (宮本 雅志 Miyamoto Masashi)
- Shoko Aida - Kayo Arisugawa (有栖川 加代 Arisugawa Kayo) (Alice's mother)
- Hiroshi Abe - Boyfriend of Alice's mother
- Sei Hiraizumi - Kenji Kuroyanagi (黒柳健次 Kuroyanagi Kenji) (Alice's father)
- Takao Osawa - Ryo Taguchi (リョウ･タグチ Ryō Taguchi) (Fashion Photographer)
- Ryōko Hirosue - Fashion Shoot Coordinator
- Tae Kimura - Ballet Teacher
- Ayumi Ito - Cameo
- Mika Kano - Cameo (as herself)

== Production ==
Director Shunji Iwai was the director, producer, screenplay author and composer for the film.

== Awards ==
- Best Actress: Yū Aoi, 2005 - Japanese Professional Movie Award

== Release ==
Hana and Alice was released in Japan on March 13, 2004. The film was shown at the Seattle International Film Festival on June 8, 2005. A prequel, The Case of Hana & Alice, was released in February 2015.

== Footnotes ==
=== Bibliography ===
- Galbraith IV, Stuart (2008). The Toho Studios Story: A History and Complete Filmography. Scarecrow Press. ISBN 978-1461673743.
