= Psychiatrist Irabu series =

Japanese media franchise

- Cover of the first Japanese edition of In the Pool, the first tankōbon of the Psychiatrist Irabu stories

精神科医・伊良部シリーズ (Seishinkai Irabu shirīzu)
- Genre: Psychological
- Other book
- Written by: Hideo Okuda
- Published by: Bungeishunjū
- English publisher: Stone Bridge Press (In the Pool)
- Imprint: Bunshun Bunko (bunkobon)
- Magazine: All Yomimono
- Original run: August 2000 – January 2006
- Volumes: 3
- Live-action film

In the Pool
- Directed by: Satoshi Miki
- Written by: Satoshi Miki
- Music by: Osamu Sakaguchi
- Released: May 21, 2005
- Runtime: 101 minutes
- Live-action television film

Kūchū Buranko
- Directed by: Shōsuke Murakami
- Produced by: Shizuo Sekiguchi; Fumi Hashimoto
- Written by: Hiroshi Hashimoto
- Studio: Kyōdo Television
- Released: May 27, 2005
- Live-action television film

Kūchū Buranko
- Directed by: Masahiko Kawahara
- Produced by: Yukio Yoshimura
- Written by: Yutaka Kuramochi
- Music by: Masahiro Hasegawa
- Studio: Atelier Duncan
- Released: July 11, 2008
- Runtime: 130 minutes
- Anime television series

Welcome to Irabu's Office
- Directed by: Kenji Nakamura
- Produced by: Masato Jōno; Kōji Yamamoto; Takashi Washio
- Written by: Manabu Ishikawa
- Music by: Hideharu Mori
- Studio: Toei Animation
- Licensed by: AU: Siren Visual; NA: AnimEigo
- Original network: Fuji TV (Noitamina)
- Original run: October 15, 2009 – December 24, 2009
- Episodes: 11

The Psychiatrist Irabu series (精神科医・伊良部シリーズ) is a series of short stories by the Japanese writer Hideo Okuda that features the fictional psychiatrist Dr. Ichirō Irabu (伊良部 一郎, Irabu Ichirō).

The stories were originally published in the literary magazine All Yomimono from August 2000 to January 2006 and later collected in three tankōbon: In the Pool (イン・ザ・プール, In za Pūru), Kūchū Buranko (空中ブランコ, "Flying trapeze") and Chōchō Senkyo (町長選挙, "Mayoral election"). Of these, Kūchū Buranko is particularly acclaimed, having won Okuda the 131st Naoki Prize (given for a book published in the first half of 2004). However, as of January 2011, only In the Pool has been published in English, though the other collections have been published in other languages, including German and French.

Works in other media based on the stories include a feature film, television drama, stage play and animated television series.

== Premise ==
Ichiro Irabu (伊良部 一郎) is a psychiatrist of the Irabu General Hospital. He is pale-skinned, overweight and is overzealous in administering injections to patients. An unreasonable and rather immature person, he ignores Yamashita's plights while challenging him to mid-air trapeze flying due to his self-proclaimed "light-weightedness" in the story "Kūchū Buranko". During his student days, he frequently misunderstood his lectures. Treated as a general nuisance at the School of Medicine, he entered pediatrics soon after graduation. However, due to claims of tantrums and quarrels with child patients, he switched to psychiatry instead. Doubts remain about his actual grades.

== Stories and characters ==
=== Kūchū Buranko ===
"Kūchū Buranko" (空中ブランコ, "Flying Trapeze"; January, 2003 All Yomimono)
Kōhei Yamashita (山下 公平, Yamashita Kōhei) is a member of a circus troupe of seven years and is the leader of a flying trapeze team. Both of his parents are also members. After suffering repeated failures on the trapeze act, he visits a psychiatrist on his wife's and fellow members' advice. Because of his failure during an act, he believes his partner is harassing him. He has been played by Masato Sakai in the television drama, Kenji Sakamoto in the stage play and Toshiyuki Morikawa in the animated series.
"Harinezumi" (ハリネズミ, "Hedgehog"; July, 2003 All Yomimono)
Seiji Ino (猪野 誠司, Ino Seiji) is an underboss of the yakuza "Kioi family" from Shibuya. He suffers from such serious trypanophobia that he cannot use chopsticks and must instead use a spoon at meals. He takes a psychiatric test on his common-law wife's advice.
Gifu no Zura (義父のヅラ; "The wig of the father-in-law") (the first publishing "All Yomimono", October, 2003 issue)
Tatsuro Ikeyama (池山 達郎) is a university lecturer and is a doctor of neurology working in a university-affiliated hospital. His father-in-law is Dean of the School of Medicine, which could potentially aid in his future employment prospects. He was also classmate of Irabu's during their college days. He has a type of neurosis that compels him to force any place of tidiness into disarray. This disorder is so strong that, with just one glance at his father-in-law's wig, Ikeyama becomes agonized by the impulse of wanting to strip it off his head. Originally published in the All Yomimono with the title Kyōju no Zura (教授のヅラ; "The wig of the professor").
Hot Corner (ホットコーナー; "Third base") (the first publishing "All Yomimono", April, 2003 issue)
Shinichi Bando (坂東 真一) is a pro-baseball player and a ten-year veteran third baseman. He suffered from yips and leaves his first team by pretending to have an injured right shoulder.
"Joryū Sakka" (女流作家, "Chick Lit Writer"; January, 2004 All Yomimono)
Aiko Hoshiyama (星山 愛子) is a popular novelist known for her stories, which "express the subtleties of the hearts of today's urban men and women." While working on her newest story, she becomes ill at ease with writing new material. After relapsing into a continuous state of compulsive vomiting from which she had previously been cured, she consults psychiatry.

== Adaptations ==
=== Film ===
In the Pool (イン・ザ・プール; stylized as IN THE POOL) is a 2005 feature film directed by Satoshi Miki, based on three of the stories by Hideo Okuda collected in the book of the same name, which stars Suzuki Matsuo as Irabu, Joe Odagiri as Tetsuya Taguchi and Seiichi Tanabe as Kazuo Ōmori. It was released in cinemas in Japan on May 14, 2005.

=== Television drama ===
Kūchū Buranko (空中ブランコ) is a 2005 one-off television drama based primarily on the story of the same name by Hideo Okuda, which stars Hiroshi Abe as Irabu. It was produced by Fuji Television and broadcast by them on May 27, 2005.

Cast

- Ichiro Irabu (Hiroshi Abe)
- Mayumi (Yumiko Shaku)
- Kohei Yamashita (Masato Sakai)
- Hiromi Yasukawa (Hitomi Satō)
- Seiji Ino (Kenichi Endō)
- Elly (Sachiko Kokubu)
- Uchida (Seiji Iinuma)
- Yoshimatsu (Yutaka Matsushige)

Staff

- Planning: Akihiro Arai, Kenichiro Yasuhara (Fuji Television)
- Script: Hiroshi Hashimoto
- Producer: Shizuo Sekiguchi, Fumi Hashimoto (Kyodo Television)
- Direction: Masanori Murakami (Kyodo Television)
- Production: Fuji Television, Kyodo Television

=== Play ===
Kūchū Buranko (空中ブランコ) is a 2008 play by Yutaka Kuramochi based on the story of the same name by Hideo Okuda. The original production by theatre company Atelier Duncan was directed by Masahiko Kawahara and ran for 21 performances from April 20 to May 5, 2008, at the Tokyo Metropolitan Art Space, then toured for the remainder of the month starting in Kōchi, Kōchi on the 8th and ending in Kamisu, Ibaraki on the 29th. The original cast included Hiroyuki Miyasako as Dr. Irabu, Eriko Satō as Mayumi, Kenji Sakamoto as Kōhei Yamashita, Yumiko Takahashi and Takashika Kobayashi, with supporting roles performed by, among others, the male idols Takashi Nagayama as Haruki, Ryūji Kamiyama and Ire Shiozaki and members of the G-Rockets acro troupe. It was produced with Dentsu and sponsored by Dentsu and TV Asahi.

A video recording was made, which premiered on July 11, 2008, on the television station WOWOW and has since been rebroadcast several times and released on DVD-Video on October 24, 2008.

=== Anime ===
Welcome to Irabu's Office (空中ブランコ, Kūchū Buranko) is a 2009 Japanese animated television series of 11 episodes based on the psychiatrist Irabu stories by Hideo Okuda, produced at Toei Animation under the series direction of Kenji Nakamura for Fuji Television's noitamina programming block. Though ostensibly an animated series, its visuals are more specifically a mélange of traditional animation with rotoscoped or otherwise processed live-action video and other imagery. Manabu Ishikawa's series composition adapts the stories to be set in Tokyo during about one week from December 17 to Christmas (corresponding with the original broadcast, which concluded on Christmas Eve) and for the chief characters of each story to appear also as supporting players in each other's narratives.

The plot of each episode follows a common thread. Irabu is consulted by a patient suffering from a psychological problem or a problem for which other medical approaches have been exhausted. Each of the patients' heads is morphed into an animal head in some scenes after Mayumi administers the vitamin shot to them. Each patient somehow ties into one another; for example, the first patient meets the second and seventh patients the first episode.

The series won the Pulcinella award for Best Television Series in the "Young Adults" (14–17 years) division at the 2010 Cartoons on the Bay international animation festival in the province of Genoa, Italy. The jury of that year, presided over by Gary Goldman, commended it as a "unique representation of the complex inner world of adolescents." Noted animation blogger Benjamin Ettinger found it to be lacking in interest in the animation itself. In his opinion, the extreme eclecticism of the visual design was no substitute for the finely crafted world of Nakamura and character designer and chief animation director Takashi Hashimoto's earlier Ayakashi: Samurai Horror Tales and Mononoke. However, the series was still highly enjoyable thanks to excellence on the part of Nakamura and the episode directors. The series highlighted the incorporation of real-life gravure idol Yumi Sugimoto as Mayumi as a welcome subversion of moe.

On July 31, 2026, AnimEigo announced at Otakon they had licensed the anime series for a North American Blu-ray release with an brand new English dub in 2027.

Staff

- Screenplay: Manabu Ishikawa, Isao Murayama, Tomoko Taguchi
- Art design: Shoji Tokiwa
- Color setting: Rumiko Nagai
- CG director: Nobuhiro Morita
- Photography director: Kazuhiro Yamada
- Sound director: Yukio Nagasaki
- Music: Hideharu Mori
- Assistance of the direction: Kimitoshi Chioka

Theme songs

- Opening theme: "Upside Down" by Denki Groove
- Ending theme: "Shangri-La (Y.Sunahara 2009 Remodel)" by Denki Groove

==== Characters ====
Ichiro Irabu (伊良部 一郎, Irabu Ichirō)
Voiced by: Yūji Mitsuya as Big & Middle Irabu
Voiced by: Romi Park as Little Irabu
Dr. Irabu is the son of the founder of the Irabu General Hospital. Irabu is a psychiatrist with a care-free, eccentric, and childlike personality. He changes appearance throughout scenes. In his first form, he is slightly overweight and wears bright clothes under his labcoat with a large green bear head that can change expression to suit his. "Middle Irabu" is slimmer, wearing more normal attire. In this form, he has long blond hair, red glasses, and a pair of green bear ears. His personality in this form is notably effeminate. His final form is "little Irabu" (him as a boy), with an oversized lab coat, and shorts instead of trousers. He is quite mellow in this form but can become ecstatic.
Irabu has a strange angle to his line of medicine, insisting that all of his patients have a vitamin shot (having a fetish for injections) and insisting that his patients face their problems head on. He is seen by other psychiatrists as childish and even obscene, although his unorthodox method of treatment seem to work.
Mayumi (マユミ)
Performed by: Yumi Sugimoto
A sullen nurse who serves as Irabu's assistant. She wears a somewhat revealing nurse's uniform and uses her sex appeal to distract patients while giving injections; she is always deadpan. In the episode "Friends," it is revealed that she enjoys being alone because she finds it easier and that she prefers men who are lone wolves like her. She does not have a cell phone but uses one at the end of episode 6 to contact Yuta, the patient from the "Friends" episode.
Fukuitchi (福井っち)
A psychiatrist who is not part of the storyline but frequently halts scenes and pops in via a door-like cut from the stopped picture to briefly provide medical commentary.
Kohei Yamashita (山下 公平, Yamashita Kōhei)
Performed by: Toshiyuki Morikawa
An aerialist who suddenly fails repeatedly.
Tetsuya Taguchi (田口 哲也, Taguchi Tetsuya)
Performed by: Takahiro Sakurai
A public servant at the ward office who has a persistent erection due to emotional issues, both at work and with his ex-wife.
Junichi Hoshiyama (星山 純一, Hoshiyama Jun'ichi)
Performed by: Shin-ichiro Miki
A romance novelist suffering from obsessive-compulsive disorder and severe writer's block.
Shinichi Bando (坂東 真一, Bandō Shin'ichi)
Performed by: Daisuke Namikawa
A pro-baseball player troubled with the yips, brought on by a younger, popular contender for his spot.
Tatsuro Ikeyama (池山 達郎, Ikeyama Tatsurō)
performed by: Hiroaki Hirata
A college lecturer and doctor of neurology. He has compulsive urges to do destructive and strange things.
Yuta Tsuda (津田 雄太, Tsuda Yūta)
Performed by: Miyu Irino
A high school student with a mobile phone addiction.
Seiji Ino (猪野 誠司, Ino Seiji)
Performed by: Hiroki Takahashi
He is a yakuza with a phobia of edges.
Yoshio Iwamura (岩村 義雄, Iwamura Yoshio)
Performed by: Mitsuo Iwata
Self-diagnosed obsessive-compulsive.
Hiromi Yasukawa (安川 ヒロミ, Yasukawa Hiromi)
Performed by: Wataru Hatano
An actor worried about his self-image.
Mitsuo Tanabe (田辺 満男, Tanabe Mitsuo)
Performed by: Ryotaro Okiayu
A representative director chairman of a newspaper publishing company.
Hideo Tsuda (津田 秀雄, Tsuda Hideo)
Performed by: Tōru Furuya
Assistant Manager of the Paramedic Department at Irabu General Hospital and the father of Yuta Tsuda.
