= What to Do with the Dead Kaiju? =

- Film poster
- Directed by: Satoshi Miki
- Written by: Satoshi Miki
- Produced by: Hiroko Furukubo; Yuta Nakai; Yasushi Sutô; Umihiko Yamao
- Starring: Ryosuke Yamada; Tao Tsuchiya; Gaku Hamada
- Cinematography: Haruyuki Takada
- Edited by: Takashi Tominaga
- Music by: Kōji Ueno
- Production company: Toei Company
- Distributed by: Toei Company; Shochiku
- Release date: 4 February 2022 (Japan)
- Running time: 115 minutes
- Country: Japan
- Language: Japanese

What to Do with the Dead Kaiju? (Japanese: 大怪獣のあとしまつ, lit. 'Aftermath of the Giant Monster') is a 2022 Japanese comedy-drama kaiju film written and directed by Satoshi Miki, starring Ryosuke Yamada, Tao Tsuchiya and Gaku Hamada. It is the first co-production between film studios Toei Company and Shochiku.

== Story ==
The great kaiju that struck fear to Japan has died. The public cheers and is relieved. The carcass is nicknamed "Hope" for the various potentials it could have. However, the carcass rots as it lays there, and fears of an explosion arise. Thus, in order to dispose of the body, the young men and women of the Tokumutai take on the dangerous disposal, as the fate of Japan hinges on their success.

== Cast ==
- Ryosuke Yamada as Arata Obinata
- Tao Tsuchiya as Yukino Amane
- Gaku Hamada as Masahiko Ame
- Joe Odagiri as Ryo 'Blues' Aoshima
- Toshiyuki Nishida as Kan Nishiotachime
- Hidekazu Mashima as Seiichiro Shikishima
- Eri Fuse as Sayuri Renbutsu
- Seiji Rokkaku as Hiroto Sugihara
- Toshihiro Yashiba as Manabu Takenaka
- Yoshiki Arizono as Murasaki Kawanishi
- SUMIRE as Yamaneko Kunugi
- Kenzo Ryu as Tsukuru Michio
- Megumi as Yuko Amaguri
- Ryo Iwamatsu as Bokudo Ioroi
- Yōji Tanaka as Hayato Nakajima
- Gin Pun Chou as Yukino's mother
- Kyusaku Shimada as Wataru Nakagaichi
- Takashi Sasano as Jiro Zaizen
- Rinko Kikuchi as Sen Masago
- Fumi Nikaido as Sayoko
- Shota Sometani as Denki Mukogawa
- Yutaka Matsushige as Noboru Yamikumo
- Taisei Kido as Suda

== Production ==
In 2006, Satoshi Miki expressed interest in producing a film about an operation to dispose of a kaiju corpse; in particular, he wanted to feature Daiei Film's Gamera. At that time, the project was not greenlit. Years later, Miki proposed a project about Kamen Rider series antagonist Shocker to Toei, referencing Joker and other similar productions as influences on his vision. As it was not approved, he instead submitted an alternative pitch based on the aforementioned ideas from 2006, which became the basis for What to Do with the Dead Kaiju?.

== Release ==
What to Do with the Dead Kaiju? was released in Japan on 4 February 2022 and on Blu-ray and DVD on 13 July.

== Reception ==
The film has received negative reviews from both critics and audiences. On the review aggregation website Rotten Tomatoes, the film holds an approval rating of 29% based on 7 reviews, with an average rating of 4.7/10. Japanese audiences took to social media and dubbed the film "The Devilman of the Reiwa Era", referring to another tokusatsu movie that was received poorly.

Kyle Anderson of Nerdist gave the film a rating of 3.5/5 and wrote that it "deftly straddles the line between satire/parody and legitimate disaster film."

Whang Yee Ling of The Straits Times rated the film 2 stars out of 5 and wrote that despite its "promising" premise, the film is "at once hectic and plodding" and "fares no better even as a parody of Japan's political inertia and bureaucracy."

James Hadfield of The Japan Times rated the film 2 stars out of 5 and wrote that while Fuse "gets the balance just right" and Hamada "has obvious fun playing a villain for a change", the film "seems oblivious to whether any of the ideas it flings against the wall are sticking."

Christopher Stewardson of Our Culture Mag rated the film 2 stars out of 5 and wrote that despite the "solid" first 10 minutes, it "loses itself to clumsy comedy and contrived endings."

Yuichi Maeda criticized the film on a J-CAST interview. He stated that audiences would expect a more dramatic political and military thriller similar to Shin Godzilla, only to be met with unfunny gags and a screenplay with little to no realism. Hinataka on Netlabo shared similar sentiments, comparing the movie unfavorably to Don't Look Up.
