= The Lone Scalpel =

- Film poster
- Directed by: Izuru Narushima
- Screenplay by: Masato Katō
- Based on: A novel by Toshihiko Ogane
- Produced by: Masashi Yagi; Kazuhito Amano
- Starring: Shinichi Tsutsumi; Yui Natsukawa; Hisashi Yoshizawa; Katsuhisa Namase; Akira Emoto
- Cinematography: Junichi Fujisawa
- Edited by: Hideaki Ohata
- Music by: Goro Yasukawa
- Distributed by: Toei Company
- Release dates: February 2010 (Yubari International Fantastic Film Festival); June 5, 2010 (Japan)
- Running time: 125 minutes
- Country: Japan
- Language: Japanese

The Lone Scalpel (Japanese: 孤高のメス, Hepburn: Kokō no Mesu) is a 2010 Japanese medical drama film directed by Izuru Narushima. The film was nominated for Best Picture at the 34th Japan Academy Prize.

== Cast ==
- Shinichi Tsutsumi as Dr. Toma
- Yui Natsukawa as Ryoko Nakamura
- Hisashi Yoshizawa
- Noriko Nakagoshi
- Yutaka Matsushige
- Hiroki Narimiya as Nakamura's adult son
- Kenichi Yajima
- Mitsuru Hirata
- Kimiko Yo
- Katsuhisa Namase
- Akira Emoto

== Reception ==
Critics praised Shinichi Tsutsumi's "always excellent" acting and Yui Natuskawa's "superbly modulated performance". Others criticized the story: "Though somewhat melodramatic, and with a highly convoluted story rife with subplots, the film has enough intensity to keep its momentum going."
