= Satoshi Miki =

Japanese film director

- 三木 聡
- Born: 9 August 1961 (age 65); Yokohama, Kanagawa, Japan
- Education: Keio University
- Occupations: Director, screenwriter
- Years active: 1981–present
- Spouse: Eri Fuse

Satoshi Miki (三木 聡, Miki Satoshi; born 9 August 1961) is a Japanese film director and screenwriter. He has directed and written many films from 1981 to present day.

== Works ==
=== Films ===
Year	Title	Role	Notes	Source
2004	68 Films	Director		
2005	In the Pool	Director, Screenwriter		
2005	Turtles Are Surprisingly Fast Swimmers	Director, Screenwriter		
2006	Damejin	Director, Screenwriter		
2007	The Insects Unlisted in the Encyclopedia	Director, Screenwriter		
2007	Adrift in Tokyo	Director, Screenwriter		
2009	Instant Swamp	Director, Screenwriter		
2013	It's Me, It's Me	Director, Screenwriter		
2018	Louder! Can't Hear What You're Singin', Wimp!	Director, Screenwriter		
2022	What to Do with the Dead Kaiju?	Director, Screenwriter		
2022	Convenience Story	Director, Screenwriter		

=== Television ===
Year(s)	Title	Role	Notes	Source
1997	Downtown no Gottsu Ee Kanji	Writer		
