= Otōto (2010 film) =

- Film poster
- Directed by: Yoji Yamada
- Written by: Yoji Yamada; Emiko Hiramatsu
- Produced by: Suketsugu Noda; Hiroshi Fukasawa; Kenichi Tamura; Ichirō Yamamoto
- Starring: Sayuri Yoshinaga; Tsurube Shofukutei; Yū Aoi
- Cinematography: Masashi Chikamori
- Edited by: Iwao Ishi
- Music by: Isao Tomita
- Production companies: Shochiku; Sumitomo Corporation; TV Asahi; Hakuhodo DY Media Partners; Eisei Gekijo; Denner Systems; Nippon Shuppan Hanbai (Nippan) K.K.; Tokyo FM; Yahoo! Japan; Yomiuri Shimbun; Asahi Broadcasting Corporation; Nagoya Broadcasting Network; Kinoshita Komuten
- Distributed by: Shochiku
- Release date: January 30, 2010 (Japan)
- Running time: 126 minutes
- Country: Japan
- Language: Japanese
- Box office: $19,969,473

Otōto (Japanese: おとうと; lit. "Younger Brother") is a 2010 drama film by Yoji Yamada. The first screening of this film outside Japan was at the closing ceremony of the 60th Berlin Film Festival in 2010.

== Plot ==
The story unfolds as the young Koharu, the daughter of a pharmacist in a modest neighborhood of Tokyo, is about to marry the son of a prestigious family. Before the event, everybody is anxious that Tetsuro, the younger brother of Koharu's mother, Ginko, might attend the wedding ceremony. Tetsuro is seen as the black sheep of the family, and though he has lived with the family for quite some time after the death of Koharu's father, Ginko and Koharu are embarrassed by his childish behavior and drunkenness.

At first, everybody is relieved that Tetsuro has not come to the wedding. But he turns up at the reception in a loaned kimono and starts drinking heavily and causing a ruckus. During the event, he reveals his special relationship to Koharu: Her father asked him to name her, something he is still particularly proud of as every other endeavor in his life failed miserably.

Afterwards, the family is forced to apologize formally to the groom's family, and the oldest brother of Ginko and Tetsuro severs all ties with his younger brother. After letting Tetsuro stay with her for a short time, Ginko lends him money to go back to Osaka.

Tetsuro's behavior casts a shadow over his niece Koharu's marriage, and soon she has to move in with her mother again. Even Ginko's patience with her brother comes to an end when she is forced to reimburse a lover of his who had entrusted him with her savings which he has gambled away. Now even Ginko severs her ties with Tetsuro and does not want to hear from him anymore. The next time he visits her, Ginko and Koharu throw him out.

Having gotten a divorce, Koharu tries to get her life back together, and she starts a new relationship with a shy carpenter from the neighborhood.

Finally, Ginko―who has secretly filled a missing person report―gets the news that Tetsuro has been hospitalized in Osaka. Despite his misbehavior, she is deeply worried and visits him in Osaka, learning that he is terminally ill with lung cancer and living in a hospice. Despite his illness, Tetsuro has lost neither his sense of humor nor his childish character, and Ginko is moved to see him being merry among the other patients and the staff of the hospice who have learned to enjoy his character.

Tetsuro predicts his own day of death, telling Ginko that the Buddha told him in a dream.

When the day draws closer, Ginko gets the news that Tetsuro's health is deteriorating. She hurries to Osaka and finds him as cheerful as ever, even tricking her into giving him a drink through his feeding tube. When his death gets closer, Koharu arrives as well and finally forgives her uncle on his deathbed.

Some time later, Koharu makes preparations for her upcoming wedding with the shy carpenter. Around the dinner table Ginko's senile mother-in-law suggests inviting Tetsuro, and Koharu and Ginko agree, moved to tears by their memories.

== Cast ==
- Sayuri Yoshinaga as Ginko
- Tsurube Shofukutei as Tetsuro
- Yū Aoi as Koharu
- Ryō Kase as Akira
- Haruko Kato as Kinuyo Takano
- Takashi Sasano as Maruyama

== Background ==
Kon Ichikawa had made a film of the same name, Otōto, based on a novel by Aya Koda, in 1960, which won a Special Distinction Award at the Cannes Film Festival the following year.

== Film festivals ==
Film Festival	Date of ceremony	Category	Participants/Recipients	Result
34th Japan Academy Prize	18 February 2011	Best Film	Otōto	Nominated
34th Japan Academy Prize	18 February 2011	Best Director	Yoji Yamada	Nominated
34th Japan Academy Prize	18 February 2011	Best Male Actor	Tsurube Shofukutei	Nominated
34th Japan Academy Prize	18 February 2011	Best Female Actor	Sayuri Yoshinaga	Nominated
34th Japan Academy Prize	18 February 2011	Best Female Accompanying Actor	Yū Aoi	Nominated
34th Japan Academy Prize	18 February 2011	Best Music	Isao Tomita	Nominated
34th Japan Academy Prize	18 February 2011	Best Cinematography	Masashi Chikamori	Nominated
34th Japan Academy Prize	18 February 2011	Best Lighting	Takakazu Watanabe	Nominated
34th Japan Academy Prize	18 February 2011	Best Sound Effects	Kazumi Kishida	Nominated
34th Japan Academy Prize	18 February 2011	Best Editing	Iwao Ishi	Nominated
