= Rainbow Song =

- Film poster
- Directed by: Naoto Kumazawa
- Written by: Ami Sakurai; Miyuki Saito; Aminosan
- Produced by: Shunji Iwai; Toshihiro Kitta
- Starring: Hayato Ichihara; Juri Ueno; Yū Aoi; Kuranosuke Sasaki
- Cinematography: Massayuki Fuji; Shinichi Tsunoda
- Edited by: Naoto Kumazawa
- Music by: Hiroaki Yamashita
- Distributed by: Toho
- Release dates: October 21, 2006 (Tokyo International Film Festival); October 28, 2006 (Japan)
- Running time: 117 minutes
- Country: Japan
- Language: Japanese

Rainbow Song (Japanese: 虹の女神, Hepburn: Niji no Megami) is a 2006 Japanese film by director Naoto Kumazawa and produced by Shunji Iwai (who also co-wrote the screenplay under pseudonym Aminosan). Kumazawa had worked with Iwai before, having directed the making-of documentary for Swallowtail Butterfly.

== Plot ==
Tomoya Kishida (Hayato Ichihara) is working as a staffer in a television studio when he hears about the death of his close friend, Aoi Sato (Juri Ueno). This sparks his recollection of the events in life they shared from meeting at a record store, shooting a short film as part of their university film club, to saying their last goodbyes. The movie moves through their times together. They initially meet while Kishida is stalking Aoi's friend. Initially repelled by the awkward Kishida, Aoi uses Kishida in a student film. They make the film together, and Aoi is forced to step in as the lead, whereupon she kisses Kishida. They eventually spend a lot of time together and start to get close, until Aoi decides to go overseas. Kishida gets a job at the television studio, while Aoi leaves to further her career and broaden her horizons. Though in love with each other, neither had the courage to confess their feelings before it was too late.

== Cast ==
- Hayato Ichihara as Kishida Tomoya
- Juri Ueno as Sato Aoi
- Yū Aoi as Sato Kana
- Ami Suzuki as Kubo Sayumi
