= Adrift in Tokyo =

Tenten
- DVD cover
- Directed by: Satoshi Miki
- Screenplay by: Satoshi Miki
- Based on: Tokyo Stroll by Yoshinaga Fujita
- Produced by: Shoichiro Ohmura; Akihiko Yose; Nobuaki Shimohashi; Tetsuji Hayashi
- Starring: Joe Odagiri; Tomokazu Miura; Kyōko Koizumi; Yuriko Yoshitaka
- Cinematography: Sôhei Tanikawa
- Edited by: Nobuyuki Takahashi
- Music by: Osamu Sakaguchi
- Production company: Stylejam; Geneon Entertainment
- Release date: 10 November 2007 (Japan)
- Running time: 101 minutes
- Country: Japan
- Language: Japanese

Adrift in Tokyo (Japanese: 転々, Hepburn: Tenten) is a 2007 Japanese film written and directed by Satoshi Miki, based on the novel Tokyo Stroll by Yoshinaga Fujita.

== Synopsis ==
Fumiya Takemura is a law major in his eighth year at university. He has over 800,000 yen in debt and no way to pay it back. Aiichiro Fukuhara, a debt collector, offers to write off Takemura’s debt in exchange for accompanying Fukuhara on a walk around Tokyo. Takemura is also told that he will be given 1 million yen in reward. Although he feels suspicious, since he has nothing to lose, he accepts Fukuhara's proposal and the two begin their walk.

As they go for a walk, their past is gradually revealed. Takemura was abandoned by his parents when he was young. Therefore, Takemura doesn’t have any memory of being taken out by his parents for fun. Fukuhara suggests that they visit some places that hold Takemura's memories, and they go to the place where Takemura used to live, but it is a vacant lot. When they visit a nearby tatami mat shop, because Takemura's father once slept with the owner's wife, the owner renews his anger. They also go to a place where the girl, who had a crush on Takemura when he was an elementary school student, is "cos-playing" and meet her.

Meanwhile, a few days ago Fukuhara beat his wife, accidentally causing her death, and the body is being left lying on the bed in their home. Fukuhara's final destination on his walk is the Metropolitan Police Department, where he is thinking of turning himself in. Takemura advises him that he will not be eligible for a reduction in his sentence if he does not turn himself in before the body is discovered, but Fukuhara does not rush to turn himself in. Fukuhara beat his wife because he found out that she had been hunting for young men in the Shibuya area. The two also visit several places that are memorable to Fukuhara and his wife. Fukuhara also says that curry and rice would be his last meal before going into prison. Takemura suggests to Fukuhara that he run away without turning himself in, but Fukuhara does not listen.

The two visit Makiko and stay at Makiko’s house for a few days. Fukuhara was once asked to pretend to be a relative of the bride at a wedding, and Makiko played a role of Fukuhara's wife then. In the house, there is a photo of the fake couple at the wedding reception. As Makiko's real niece, Fufumi, is always hanging out at Makiko's house, Fukuhara plays Makiko's husband and Takemura plays their son in front of Fufumi. When Makiko is alone with Takemura, she says that she heard that Fukuhara had a son who died shortly after birth.

Then, at Fukuhara's request, Makiko makes curry and rice for dinner. Realizing that Fukuhara has finally made up his mind to turn himself in the next day, Takemura loses his appetite.

The next day, the two continue their walk. As they approach the Metropolitan Police Department, Fukuhara walks alone towards the entrance of the Department, and the film comes to an end.

The film is based on the original novel by the 125th Naoki Prize winner Yoshinaga Fujita.

== Cast ==
- Joe Odagiri as Fumiya Takemura
- Tomokazu Miura as Aiichiro Fukuhara
- Kyōko Koizumi as Makiko
- Yuriko Yoshitaka as Fufumi

== Festivals ==
- Udine Far East Festival 2008
- New York Asian Film Festival 2008
- Neuchâtel International Fantasy Film Festival 2008
- Fantasia Festival 2008
- Raindance Film Festival 2008
- Toronto Reel Asian International Film Festival 2008 – Closing Film
- Ottawa International Film Festival

== Awards ==
- Fantasia International Film Festival: Best Script (Satoshi Miki); Special Mention (Jo Odagiri and Tomokazu Miura)
- Kinema Junpo Awards: Best Supporting Actor (Tomokazu Miura)

== International Release ==
- Japan : November 10, 2007
- Canada : Montreal : April 10, 2009 – (DÉRIVE À TOKYO) Toronto : May 1, 2009 & Vancouver : May 22, 2009
