= Library War: The Wings of Revolution =

2012 Japanese animated film by Takayuki Hamana

- Theatrical release poster
- Kanji: 図書館戦争 革命のつばさ
- Revised Hepburn: Toshokan Sensō: Kakumei no Tsubasa
- Directed by: Takayuki Hamana
- Screenplay by: Kenji Konuta
- Based on: Library Revolution by Hiro Arikawa
- Produced by: Takashi Watanabe; Izumi Murakami
- Starring: Marina Inoue; Tomoaki Maeno; Issey Ogata; Akira Ishida; Tatsuhisa Suzuki; Miyuki Sawashiro; Kanji Suzumori; Megumi Han
- Cinematography: Kōji Tanaka
- Edited by: Junichi Uematsu; Yoshinori Murakami
- Music by: Yugo Kanno
- Production company: Production I.G
- Distributed by: Kadokawa Pictures
- Release dates: June 5, 2012 (Tokyo); June 16, 2012 (Japan)
- Running time: 105 minutes
- Country: Japan
- Language: Japanese
- Box office: ¥210 million (US$2.63 million)

Library War: The Wings of Revolution (Japanese: 図書館戦争 革命のつばさ, Hepburn: Toshokan Sensō: Kakumei no Tsubasa) is a 2012 Japanese animated film adapting Library Revolution, the fourth and final volume of Library War light novel series by Hiro Arikawa, and a sequel to Library War (2008). Produced by Production I.G and distributed by Kadokawa Pictures, the film is directed by Takayuki Hamana from a script written by Kenji Konuta. The film follows the Library Defense Force protecting a novelist, who becomes the target of the Media Betterment Committee due to the resemblance of his book to a recent terror attack.

The anime film adaptation was confirmed in June 2011. Hamana and Konuta joined the staff in December 2011. The voice cast of the anime series confirmed their return to reprise their roles for the film in February 2012, with Issey Ogata and Megumi Han joining them the following month.

Library War: The Wings of Revolution had an early screening in Tokyo on June 5, 2012, and was widely released in Japan on June 16. The film grossed ¥210 million at the box office.

== Plot ==
A terrorist attack has taken place at the Tsuruga Nuclear Power Plant, resulting in the swift passage of an anti-terrorism bill that gives the Media Betterment Committee (MBC) and other agencies additional jurisdiction. While on a date, Iku Kasahara and Atsushi Dojo are called back to the Kanto Library Base to protect Kurato Tōma, the author of Nuclear Peril which has a plotline similar to the recent terrorist attack and who is currently a wanted man by the MBC. After purchasing eyewear as part of Tōma's disguise, Kasahara and Dojo encounter Kiyoka Kojima, a bookstore staff who was also saved by Dojo in the past. The Library Defense Force (LDF) files a lawsuit, with Tōma as the plaintiff, against the MBC at the Tokyo District Court. The court rules in favor of the plaintiff, causing the MBC to file an appeal at a high court. One night, members of the Future Library Committee attempt to abduct Tōma but are apprehended by Mikihisa Komaki and Hikaru Tezuka. Asako Shibasaki then tells Hikaru that she is going to deal with his brother Satoshi.

Tōma is moved from the Kanto Library Base to Kazuichi Inamine's estate. Meanwhile, Shibasaki proposes to Satoshi to become the voice of anti-censorship in the National Diet in exchange for her overlooking his recent plot to abduct Tōma. A few days before the high court's verdict on the appeal, MBC agents infiltrate Inamine's estate, but Kasahara and Dojo manage to bring Tōma back to the Kanto Library Base. On the day of the verdict, the high court rules in favor of the appeal, resulting in the lawsuit being brought to the Supreme Court of Japan. During a meeting, Kasahara suggests Tōma seek asylum, which is then approved by the LDF as a last resort if they fail to win the lawsuit.

On the day of the verdict, the Supreme Court rules that Tōma is to be prohibited from writing for five years. Kasahara, Dojo, and other members of the LDF attempt to transport Tōma to the Dutch embassy, but they are blocked by the MBC. Kasahara, Dojo, and Tōma proceed on foot toward the American embassy, during which Dojo gets shot in the leg by an MBC agent. Dojo is brought to Kojima's workplace at the Books Kinokuniya store to recuperate, while Kasahara and Tōma proceed to the consulates found in Osaka. On their way, Tōma tells Kasahara that he is going to write a fairy tale about a troubadour being saved by two bluebirds from oppression to perform music that is not approved by a king.

Kasahara and Tōma arrive near the British Consulate-General, but they are caught by MBC agents. The LDF arrives after receiving Kasahara's coded message about their location, giving her and Tōma time to proceed next to the American consulate, where they are blocked by MBC's huge reinforcements. As the two are about to get caught, a diplomat from the British consulate arrives to save Tōma and accept his asylum after receiving a call from the LDF. The recent incident has garnered the attention of the international community, condemning the Media Betterment Act. One week later, Kasahara visits Dojo in a hospital, where they affirm their love. A year after the revision of the act prohibiting the use of weapons, Kasahara, now married to Dojo, overlooks the recruits in the LDF as their instructor.

== Voice cast ==
- Marina Inoue as Iku Kasahara
- Tomoaki Maeno as Atsushi Dojo
- Miyuki Sawashiro as Asako Shibasaki
- Akira Ishida as Mikihisa Komaki
- Tatsuhisa Suzuki as Hikaru Tezuka
- Kanji Suzumori as Ryusuke Genda
- Haruo Satō as Kazuichi Inamine
- Ryōta Akazawa as Akiya Ogata
- Hiroyuki Yoshino as Satoshi Tezuka
- Rie Tanaka as Maki Orikuchi
- Unshō Ishizuka as Mitsumasa Hikoe
- Yōji Ueda as Takeshi Enoki
- Kana Ueda as Marie Nakazawa
- Megumi Han as Kiyoka Kojima
- Yūsuke Koide as Rikudō Mark Ingram
- Issey Ogata as Kurato Tōma

== Production ==
In June 2011, an anime film based on Library War light novel series by Hiro Arikawa was first reported to be in the works through a pamphlet advertising new releases from Kadokawa Shoten. It would adapt the light novel's fourth and final volume, Library Revolution, after the first three volumes were animated as the 2008 television series Library War. Takayuki Hamana and Kenji Konuta were respectively announced as the director and screenwriter of the film in December 2011, with Production I.G as its animation studio. In February 2012, Kadokawa Pictures listed the film to their slate of works scheduled for release that year, with its title revealed as Library War: The Wings of Revolution. That month, the voice cast of the anime series were set to reprise their roles, including Marina Inoue as Iku Kasahara, Tomoaki Maeno as Atsushi Dojo, Tatsuhisa Suzuki as Hikaru Tezuka, Miyuki Sawashiro as Asako Shibasaki, Akira Ishida as Mikihisa Komaki, and Kanji Suzumori as Ryusuke Genda. The trailer that was released in March 2012 confirmed Issey Ogata and Megumi Han joining the cast, with their respective roles later confirmed as Kurato Tōma and Kiyoka Kojima. Additionally, Base Ball Bear lead vocalist Yūsuke Koide was confirmed to be voicing Rikudō Mark Ingram. The voice recording session began by the end of March 2012.

== Music ==
The orchestral recording of the music that would be used for Library War: The Wings of Revolution, led by its composer Yugo Kanno, began in early March 2012. Later that month, Base Ball Bear was revealed to be performing the theme song for the film titled "First Love" (初恋, Hatsukoi). The film's original soundtrack was released by EMI Music Japan on June 13, 2012.

Library War: The Wings of Revolution – Original Soundtrack track listing
No.	Title	Length
1.	"Library War: The Wings of Revolution"	2:48
2.	"Censorship"	3:08
3.	"Opening Title"	1:40
4.	"Personal Bodyguard"	1:09
5.	"Author Hunt"	1:55
6.	"Chamomile Flower"	0:21
7.	"Groundless Fear"	0:16
8.	"Bluebird"	0:51
9.	"In Silence"	1:39
10.	"Inamine Residence"	2:13
11.	"Repressive Hand"	0:51
12.	"Enemy Inspection"	1:35
13.	"Hino Nightmare Survivor"	1:06
14.	"The Prince of Memories"	1:55
15.	"Memories of That Day"	1:06
16.	"Please Write Another Great Book!"	1:16
17.	"What the Hell..."	0:51
18.	"Raid on the Inamine Residence"	4:14
19.	"Each Thoughts"	0:32
20.	"Media vs. Betterment Act"	2:24
21.	"Black Shadow"	0:50
22.	"Unprecedented Escape Plan"	1:09
23.	"Execute Operation"	2:24
24.	"At This Rate..."	1:00
25.	"Can I Go from Here Alone?"	2:32
26.	"So Noisy!"	0:29
27.	"The Story of an Old Troubadour"	1:58
28.	"I Promise to Protect You"	0:43
29.	"In Front of the Consulate General"	0:32
30.	"Beyond Midōsuji"	1:18
31.	"Two Determined People"	1:15
32.	"Instructor!"	1:31
33.	"Parting Kiss"	0:38
34.	"Kiyoka's Thoughts"	0:51
35.	"Never Run Away from What You "Like""	1:16
36.	"First Love (Theatrical Trailer Edit)"	2:47
Total length:		53:03

== Marketing ==
The trailer for Library War: The Wings of Revolution was released on March 9, 2012. By early May 2012, the Japanese black tea brand Nittoh Tea began selling their Daily Club tea bag product with packaging featuring the characters of the film at FamilyMart stores in Japan. By late that month, Books Kinokuniya stores began selling the four Library War light novel volumes with different cover illustrations each featuring different Kinokuniya stores in the background as part of the bookstore chain's collaboration with the film.

== Release ==
=== Theatrical ===
Library War: The Wings of Revolution held a preview screening at Kadokawa Cinema Shinjuku in Tokyo on June 5, 2012, and was released in Japan on June 16. The film was screened at the Waterloo Festival for Animated Cinema in Canada on November 17, 2012.

=== Home media ===
Library War: The Wings of Revolution was released on Blu-ray and DVD in Japan on January 25, 2013. The Blu-ray special edition is bundled with The Knights of Bluebird (青い鳥の騎士たち), the picture book depicted in the film, written by Arikawa. The film was aired on Wowow on May 3, 2013, and on BS12 TwellV on November 22, 2020.

== Reception ==
Library War: The Wings of Revolution grossed ¥210 million (US$2.63 million) in Japan. In the first two days since its release, the film earned ¥39 million (US$490,079) and debuted tenth place at the box office.
