= Ai Iwamura =

Japanese actress

Ai Iwamura (岩村愛, Iwamura Ai, born March 4, 1984), also known as Aiko Iwamura (岩村愛子, Iwamura Aiko) is a Japanese actress.

Iwamura is best known for her role as Mai in Battle Royale. She also fulfills some "stand-in" roles as Izumi Kanai, Noriko Nakagawa, Hirono Shimizu, and Haruka Tanizawa. Iwamura also stars as Mai in Battle Royale II: Requiem. She also voiced MarineAngemon in the anime Digimon Tamers.

== Filmography ==
=== TV anime ===
2012

- JoJo no Kimyō na Bōken as Woman (Part 1: Ep02)
