= Ai Maeda =

Ai Maeda may refer to these Japanese actresses and singers:

- Ai Maeda (voice actress) (born 1975), in the Digimon and Sailor Moon Crystal anime series
- Ai Maeda (actress) (born 1983), film and voice actress in Battle Royale and Kino's Journey respectively
