= Nanami Ohta =

Japanese actress (born 1993)

Nanami Ohta (大田ななみ, Ōta Nanami; born October 8, 1993) is a Japanese actress.

Ohta is known for her role as Hitoe Takeuchi in the film Battle Royale II: Requiem. Ohta also filled a minor role in the film Battle Royale: Special Version as one of Mitsuko Souma's childhood friends.

Ohta is one of many actresses who starred as Chibiusa in the Sailor Moon musical.
