= We Can't Change the World. But, We Wanna Build a School in Cambodia. =

2011 Japanese film by Kenta Fukasaku

- Promotional release poster
- Directed by: Kenta Fukasaku
- Based on: 僕たちは世界を変えることができない。 by Kota Hada
- Starring: Osamu Mukai, Tōri Matsuzaka, Tasuku Emoto, Masataka Kubota
- Cinematography: Kazuhiro Suzuki
- Production companies: Toei, Central Arts
- Distributed by: Toei
- Release date: September 23, 2011 (Japan)
- Running time: 126 minutes
- Country: Japan
- Language: Japanese
- Box office: US$$3,334,273

We Can't Change the World. But, We Wanna Build a School in Cambodia. (僕たちは世界を変えることができない。 But, We Wanna Build a School in Cambodia.) is a 2011 Japanese drama film based on the autobiographical novel by Kota Hada. The film was directed by Kenta Fukasaku, and it stars Osamu Mukai, Tōri Matsuzaka, Tasuku Emoto and Masataka Kubota as the main characters.

The film was released in Japanese cinemas on 23 September 2011. It grossed a total of US$3,334,273 over its four-week theatrical run in the Japanese box office.

== Plot ==
Kota is a medical school student who is doing badly for his examinations. He feels that something is missing in his life, but he is not sure what it is. One day, he chance upon a pamphlet asking for help with building schools for children in Cambodia, Kota decides to recruit his friends to complete the task.

However, in order to build the school, they will have to raise 1.5 million yen by themselves. The group go down to work, finding sponsors and recruiting volunteers. They also plan to organize club parties as their fund-raising activity. All seems smooth going as they found an IT company that was willing to sponsor them, and got many interested people to help out. Kota also meets Kaori, a nursing student who studies at the same school, whom Kota starts to feel attracted to. After an unconvincing appeal for donations at their first fund-raising party, Kaori suggested that the group visit Cambodia to feel the situation for themselves.

The group took up the advice and booked a flight to Cambodia. There, they were surprised with what they saw. After visiting a hospital for patients suffering from AIDS and a museum dedicated to the victims of Khmer Rouge, their spirit sank. In particular, Mitsuru was so affected by the experience that he had to return to Japan early. After they toured tourist sights, they proceeded to the village where their school would be built. Suddenly, they saw a group of children wading through an uncleared minefield to welcome them. They were also shocked to see the rundown state of the existing village school. In spite of that, they were cheered by the positive spirit that the children there displayed.

Upon their return to Japan, they discovered that the company that was sponsoring them was implicated in an insider trading scandal and their donation boxes were also vandalized frequently. Furthermore, many of their volunteers quit after they were unhappy with the decision to impose strict fund-raising targets. Kota himself was facing relationship problems with Kaori and deteriorating results. As such became demoralized about the project and started shutting himself at home.

This changed when a Cambodian child he met sent him a letter written in Japanese. He felt hope again, and their fund-raising activities gained momentum. In the end, they managed to raise the 1.5 million yen in the three fund-raising party, and thus the school could be built. The group was then invited to the school's opening ceremony, Before the ceremony, Kota noticed that the child who wrote to him was not present at the school. He was told that because the minefield had been cleared recently, farmland was available to the boy's family and the boy had to farm. Kota immediately went to persuade the boy's parents. Eventually, after he took the hoe and tilled the land in desperation, he managed to convince the boy's family to let him attend the village school. As such, all of the members received a warm reception by the students of the school.

== Cast ==
- Osamu Mukai as Kota Tanaka
- Tōri Matsuzaka as Mitsuru Honda
- Tasuku Emoto as Tadashi Shibayama
- Masataka Kubota as Masayuki Yano
- Eri Murakawa as Kaori Kubo
- Mei Kurokawa as Runa
- Noriko Eguchi as Nao Shino
- Masaya Kikawada as the IT company president
- Lily Franky as the bar master
- Hiroshi Abe as Professor Kondo

== Production ==
=== Filming ===
Filming of We Can't Change the World. But, We Wanna Build a School in Cambodia. first took place in Tokyo from 17 October 2010. Filming then took place in Cambodia during mid-November 2010.
