= Night Fly =

EP by Ai Maeda
- Released: Japan March 16, 2005
- Genre: J-pop, R&B
- Length: 27:40
- Label: Pony Canyon

Night Fly is the first mini-album released by Japanese actress and Japanese pop artist Ai Maeda. Pony Canyon released the CD on March 16, 2005. The album's title track "the Beautiful World" was used as the ending to Kino no Tabi, the track titled "Hajimari no Hi" (始まりの日) was used as ending theme for the first animated film "Kino's Journey: In Order to Do Something –Life Goes On– (何かをするために―life goes on.― Nanika o Suru Tame ni –life goes on.–)".

== Track listing ==
CD
No.	Title	Lyrics	Music	Arranged by	Length
1.	"Natsu No Owari (夏の終わり End of Summer)"	Hiroko	TANATONOTE	Takefumi Haketa	4:43
2.	"Cleansing"	Hiroko	Takefumi Haketa	Takefumi Haketa	4:39
3.	"Night Flight"	Hiroko	TANATONOTE	Takefumi Haketa	4:07
4.	"Yasashii Tsuki (やさしい月 Mon-friendly)"	Ai Maeda	Ōyagi Nobuyuki	Takefumi Haketa	4:39
5.	"Hajimari No Hi(はじまりの日 Day begins)"	Watanabe Momo	Ryo Sakai	Ryo Sakai	4:43
6.	"the Beautiful World"	K. Sawa Shigure, Watanabe Momo	Ryo Sakai	Ryo Sakai	4:41

== Release history ==
Region	Date	Label	Format	Catalog
Japan	March 16, 2005	Pony Canyon	CD	PCCG-00676
