= Asahiyama Zoo Story: Penguins in the Sky =

- Theatrical release poster
- Directed by: Masahiko Tsugawa
- Written by: Koshimizu Yasuhiro
- Produced by: Tadahisa Sakamoto; Hisao Nabeshima
- Starring: Toshiyuki Nishida; Ai Maeda; Yūki Amami; Akira Emoto
- Cinematography: Yūdai Katō
- Edited by: Shinji Tanaka
- Music by: Ryudo Uzaki; Haseo Nakanishi
- Distributed by: Kadokawa Pictures
- Release date: February 7, 2009 (Japan)
- Running time: 112 minutes
- Country: Japan
- Language: Japanese

Asahiyama Zoo Story: Penguins in the Sky (Japanese: 旭山動物園物語 ペンギンが空をとぶ, Hepburn: Asahiyama dōbutsuen: Pengin ga sora o tobu) is a 2009 Japanese film directed by Masahiko Tsugawa.

== Story ==
Based on the true story of Asahiyama Zoo in Hokkaido, the northernmost zoo in Japan. The unpopular zoo welcomes a new zoo keeper, young Yoshida (Yasuhi Nakamura), who has more affection for insects than people after years of being bullied at school when he was young. Yoshida soon realizes that Asahiyama Zoo is facing a financial crisis and the zoo director Takizawa has been doing everything in his power to save the zoo from closing down.

Moved by Takizawa's passion, Yoshida and other zoo keepers came to share the zoo director's belief that one's dreams can come true, and together they tackle this seemingly impossible task of revitalizing Asahiyama. A breakthrough arrives in the form of "Behavioral Exhibition," a method that is pioneered by Ashiyama's zoo keepers and which eventually makes the zoo renowned throughout the world.

== Cast ==
- Toshiyuki Nishida as Zoo Director Kanji Takizawa
- Yasuhi Nakamura as Tsuyoshi Yoshida
- Ai Maeda as Makoto Ogawa
- Keiko Horiuchi as Sanae Ikeuchi
- Takashi Sasano as Saburō Isogai
- Zen Kajiwara as Tokuya Mitamura
- Hisako Manda as Hatoko Hiraga
- Sansei Shiomi as Genta Tobe
- Naomasa Musaka as Teruo Mitani
- Hiroyuki Nagato as Keisuke Nirasaki
- Ittoku Kishibe as Seinosuke Yanagihara
- Akira Emoto as Itsurō Usui
- Mitsuru Fukikoshi
- Yūki Amami
- Taro Ishida
- Houka Kinoshita
- Akaji Maro
- Junichi Haruta

== Staff ==
- Director: Masahiko Makino
- Writer: Koshimizu Yasuhiro
- Music: Ryudo Uzaki, Haseo Nakanishi
- Committee members Producers: Kadokawa Pictures, NTT DoCoMo, Japan Film Fund
- Distributor: Kadokawa Pictures

== Theme Song ==
「夢になりたい」("I want to dream") 谷村新司 Tanimura Shinji (songwriter: Tanimura Shinji Arrangement: Yoshiharu Setoya)
