= Takayo Mimura =

Japanese actress (born 1985)

Takayo Mimura (三村恭代, Mimura Takayo; born September 25, 1985 in Ibaraki, Japan) is a Japanese actress.

Mimura is best known for her role as Kayoko Kotohiki in Battle Royale.

She also appears as a supporting role in Linda Linda Linda.
