= List of Library War episodes =

Library War DVD cover of volume 1 released in Japan.

The episodes of the Japanese anime series Library War are directed by Takayuki Hamana and animated and produced by Production I.G. Based on a series of light novels by Hiro Arikawa, it tells the story of a future Japan that needs libraries and their Library Team Defense Forces to protect books and stop censorship at the hands of the Media Betterment Committee, a special censorship agency established by the Japanese government.

The series premiered in Japan on April 10, 2008, on Fuji TV's Noitamina programming block and ran until June 26, 2008. Kadokawa released the series to five DVD compilations, each containing three episode except for the first two, which contained two each. The third volume contained an unaired episode and was released as an original video animation. The DVDs were released between August 6 and December 3, 2008.

Two pieces of theme music are used for the episodes: one opening theme and one ending theme. The anime's opening theme is "Atashi no Machi, Ashita no Machi" (あたしの街, 明日の街) by Hitomi Takahashi. The ending theme is "Changes" by Base Ball Bear.

== Episode listing ==
No.	Title	Original release date
1	"My Prince Charming is in the LDF"; Transliteration: "Waga Ōjisama wa Toshotai ni Ari" (Japanese: 我ガ王子様ハ図書隊ニアリ)	April 10, 2008
In 1989, the Japanese government passed the Media Betterment Act to protect the youth from being influenced by negative materials in the media. To counter this, local governments throughout the country establish "Library Defense Forces" to prevent Media Betterment Act agents from infringing on people's rights to access media deemed as banned material. A civilian, Iku Kasahara, had been accosted by an MBA agent who attempts to take away a banned book from her, but is saved by an LDF agent. Inspired, Kasahara decides to join in the Library Defense Force.
2	"Library Task Force"; Transliteration: "Raiburarī Tasuku Fōsu" (Japanese: 図書特殊部隊(ライブラリー·タスクフォース))	April 17, 2008
Kasahara gets into a rivalry with fellow LDF soldier Hikaru Tezuka, the best of the new recruits. His excellence dents Kasahara's confidence even though she receives help from Asako, her studious roommate, to improve her librarian skills. Kasahara and Tezuka mend their relationship and become friends after Media Betterment Act special forces operatives launch a raid on the Kantō library to locate some banned books. The two are able to secure the books and drive away the MBA commandos.
3	"Odawara Battle"; Transliteration: "Odawara Kōbōsen" (Japanese: 小田原攻防戦)	April 24, 2008
When an Odawara, Kanagawa museum dedicated to media information is closed after the death of its curator and owner, MBA special forces launch another operation to seize the museum and collect banned material from inside. However, Kantō LDF units mobilize to protect the facility and hold off the MBA forces from entering the museum. Kasahara is assigned to escort Kazuichi Inamine, a known backer of the Freedom of the Libraries Law and the commanding officer of various LDF units, to a memorial ceremony instead of participating in the operation when she and Inamine's party are accosted by unknown men.
4	"Rescue the Book General"; Transliteration: "Tosho Shireikan o Dakkai Seyo" (Japanese: 図書司令官ヲ奪回セヨ)	May 1, 2008
Kasahara and Inamine are taken hostage by a pro-MBA faction known as the Bakushukai, resulting in a hostage rescue operation planned by Ryusuke and Dojo. Kasahara manages to inform them of her location by a hidden message and the removal of Inamine's prosthetic leg. Kasahara reveals to Dojo that she will not quit from the LDF and plans to be way better than him. However, things do not look too good for Kasahara when she is given a letter from her parents who plan to visit her at the base.
5	"Parental Disturbance Strategy"; Transliteration: "Ryōshin Kakuran Sakusen" (Japanese: 両親攪乱(かくらん)作戦)	May 8, 2008
Kasahara tries to keep her real job as a Defense member a secret from her parents so that she is not forced to quit and return home. She tries to enlist the aid of her friends and superiors to help facilitate her parents' tour of the Kanto Library Base, but the true danger of this job is revealed when Kasahara accidentally catches a thief in the library. Her mother is worried sick and is trying to dissuade her from continuing but her father takes her side and says they should respect Kasahara's decision.
6	"Library Corps Refrain from Firing"; Transliteration: "Toshotai wa Happō Sezu" (Japanese: 図書隊ハ発砲セズ)	May 15, 2008
Kasahara, along with Lt. Komaki, are on a mission to transport a rare, valuable book back known as the "Book of Prophecy" (a reference to Fahrenheit 451) to the base, when they are attacked by the Media Betterment Act troops. One of the troopers fires at Komaki, injuring him, which causes Kasahara to reprimand the shooter telling him, he had no right to shoot in a neutral territory and that she would punch him for violating the agreement. Komaki escapes with Kasahara despite his injury and takes temporary refuge in a stationary train. They are eventually caught, during which time, Komaki mentions how Dojo as a trainee, punched an MBA trooper who fired a shot at a child, leading to a fist fight between the two factions. At this point, Komaki and Kasahara are rescued by Dojo and his troops. Komaki mentions to Kasahara, that despite everything, Dojo learns from his mistakes, and that is something Kasahara must consider learning from Dojo. Kasahara comes back to the dormitory and sees the twenty missed messages on her cell from a very worried Shibasaki.
7	"Reference of Love"; Transliteration: "Koi no Refarensu" (Japanese: 恋ノ情報探索(レファレンス))	May 22, 2008
Shibasaki begins having meetings with a man named Hikaru Asahina regarding the Library Force and the library where Shibasaki is employed. Kasahara becomes interested in this, and believes Shibasaki to be involved in a relationship. Kasahara becomes angry at Sunagawa from the Library Future Planning Committee after he posts a strongly-opinionated review on one of her favorite books. Tezuka's older brother is the leader of the Library Future Planning Committee, and when Tezuka meets with him, his older brother tries to get him to join the Committee, but Tezuka refuses. Asahina tells Shibasaki over dinner that he can silence some reports of the library where she works of unjustly disposing of certain books, but after getting advice from Kasahara, decides to do nothing. The report is leaked to the media, and it starts a frenzy, and Sunagawa accuses Kasahara of being his accomplice in the disposing of the books.
8	"Satoshi Tezuka's Schemes"; Transliteration: "Sakudō Seshi wa Tezuka Satoshi" (Japanese: 策動セシハ手塚慧(さとし))	May 29, 2008
Kasahara gets interrogated by officials of the LDF's Administration Faction due to Sunagawa's claims. Hikaru thinks that his brother, Satoshi, is influencing the Administrative Faction officials to put pressure on Kasahara and the entire LDF in order for Hikaru to defect to his Library Planning Committee. When Satoshi invites Kasahara for dinner and tells her that the LDF must surrender and disband, she tells him that she would not support his idea, even though he tells her that he would use her as a tool to pressure Hikaru even more. In the end, Dojo comes to see Kasahara despite getting wet in the rain. Due to Dojo's presence and his actions, Satoshi decides to end his interference with the Administration Faction's plans to grill Kasahara further.
9	"Here Comes the Promotion Test"; Transliteration: "Shōnin Shiken, Kitaru" (Japanese: 昇任試験, 来タル)	June 5, 2008
Kasahara, Shibasaki, and Tezuka participate in the required promotion tests for librarians. During her time spent on studying, Kasahara panics when she thinks about how the one who saved her during her time as a high school student was Dojo himself. This revelation cripples her concentration to study until Dojo assists her by helping her prepare for the test. In the end, she passes the exams with Shibasaki and Tezuka as well. Kasahara gives Dojo some Chamomile essence oil as a means of showing her gratitude before Dojo asks her to take him to the shop where she obtained the oil so as to try some Chamomile tea.
10	"Explosion of Backing Home"; Transliteration: "Satogaeri, Boppatsu" (Japanese: 里帰リ, 勃発)	June 12, 2008
The library task force is sent out to train a peace-loving library in Ibaraki Prefecture where there will be a prefectural art exhibition. There, being the first woman in the task force, Kasahara is constantly bullied by others during the mission. They even go as far as calling up Kasahara's mother and informing her of Kasahara's activities. Kasahara and her mother eventually reach an understanding. Kasahara strikes back at the members of the Affairs Department and inspires Defense members to stand up to them as well.
11	"Struggle to the Death! The Defense of Ibaraki Prefectural Exhibition"; Transliteration: "Shitō! Ibaraki Kenten Keibi" (Japanese: 死闘!茨城県展警備)	June 19, 2008
Tezuka gets information from his brother that the Media Betterment Act agents will only fight at the art exhibition for a single day, which helps the Library Corps prepare for the assault. Three hours before the exhibition opens, MBA task force units comes crashing in and the defense force holds them back even after the MBA agents try to storm the barricade with full force. Their aggression forces LDF soldiers and officers to kill them, breaking their own policy of using firearms to pin them down. MBA personnel retreat after Kasahara angrily fires at them. A lone MBA agent shoots Genda as he stands in front of the piece of art work the Library Corps was defending before unarmed LDF soldiers apprehend him. At the same time, the head of the Ibaraki library Commander Akiko Sugahara tries to destroy some implicating evidence against her. When Dojo attempts to interfere, he gets shot in the arm and caught in the resulting fire as Kasahara looks on after detaining the head librarian.
12	"The Library is for Who's Sake?"; Transliteration: "Toshokan wa Dare ga Tame ni" (Japanese: 図書館ハ誰ガタメニ)	June 26, 2008
Public criticism on the LDF, due to the massive MBA casualties, begins to grow against the LDF until Kasahara is ambushed by a reporter. Kasahara tells the reporter that the people should not be oppressed due to the MBA and their pro-censorship activities. Due to this, public criticism against the LDF dies down and instead, support grows thanks to pro-LDF media and Tezuka's older brother works in the background to eliminate anti-LDF bias. Dojo is diagnosed with agnosia due to his injuries in the Ibaraki shootout, but later recovers. Inamine decides to step down due to the discovery of radical elements in the MBA that were responsible for undermining the Mito Library Base. Genda has been promoted by the LDF's Administrative Faction as the Kantō LDF base's second commanding officer.
13	"Situation Love Handicap"; Transliteration: "Otome no Tactics" (Japanese: 恋ノ障害)	October 1, 2008 (OVA)
A man slides up to Kasahara in the library and reaches to molest her, but Kasahara flips him and detains him. When the team discovers that he picked Kasahara because of a hearing device, Komaki uncharacteristically chews the pervert out. Shibasaki and Kasahara later see Komaki meet up with a hearing-impaired girl named Marie who Komaki is in a close friendship with. However, Komaki is arrested by the MBC for an apparent violation of privacy, because he recommended a book about a hearing-impaired girl to Marie. Kasahara and Dojo clash when discussing tactics on how to rescue Komaki and if Marie should be involved. Kasahara brings Marie in anyway and she single-handedly regains her voice and pressures MBC officers to release Komaki, who realizes that he has fallen for Marie.
