= Aki Maeda =

Japanese actress and singer (born 1985)

Aki Maeda 前田 亜季
- Born: 11 July 1985 (age 41); Tokyo, Japan
- Education: Hosei University
- Occupations: Actress, singer, model
- Years active: 1992–present
- Agent: Alpha Agency
- Labels: WEA Japan, King Records
- Relatives: Ai Maeda (sister)
- Musical career
- Genre: Japanese Pop
- Instrument: Vocals
- Years active: 1998–2000
- Website: Official Site

Aki Maeda (前田 亜季, Maeda Aki; born July 11, 1985) is a Japanese actress and singer. She has an older sister named Ai Maeda.

She is perhaps best known in the west for her role as Noriko Nakagawa in the controversial 2000 film Battle Royale, which she reprised for its sequel Battle Royale II: Requiem. She graduated from Hosei University in 2008.

== Filmography ==
=== Films ===
- Gamera 2: Attack of Legion (1996)
- School Ghost Stories 2 (1996), Nanako Imai
- School Ghost Stories 3 (1997), Mayuko Fujii
- Pride (1998), Kimie Tōjō
- Gamera 3: Revenge of Iris (1999), young Ayana Hirasaka
- Battle Royale (2000)
- High School Girl's Friend (2001)
- Godzilla, Mothra and King Ghidorah: Giant Monsters All-Out Attack (2001)
- Genji: A Thousand-Year Love (2002)
- Battle Royale II: Requiem (2003)
- Out of This World (2004)
- Linda Linda Linda (2005), Kyoko
- Harami (2005)
- Saikano (2006)
- Romance of Darkness (2006)
- Aokigahara (2012)
- I Never Shot Anyone (2020)
- A Madder Red, (2021)
- Kawa no Nagare ni (2021)
- Frontline: Yokohama Bay (2025)
- Our Journey for 50 Years (2026), Mari
- The Specials (2026), Riko
- 4 Outs: Back to the Ballgame (2026), Michiko Yagami

=== Television ===
- Aoi, Sadako (2000)
- Fūrin Kazan, Ritsu (2007)
- Gochisōsan, Sakurako Muroi (2013)
- Shinya Shokudō, Sachiko's Sister (2014)
- Kuroshoin no Rokubei (2018), Tenshō-in Atsuhime
- The Return (2020)
- Mt. Fuji Erupts: Are We Prepared? (2026), Miyoko Omuro

=== Anime ===
- Cosmic Baton Girl Comet-san, Comet (2001)
- The Cat Returns, Yuki (2002)

== Discography ==
=== Studio albums ===
  - 1999: Winter Tales
  - 2000: Boys be... original soundtrack
  - 2005: we are PARAN MAUM -- Paran Maum (as drummer)
  - 2005: Linda Linda Linda original soundtrack (as drummer of Paran Maum)

=== Singles ===
  - 1999: Gomen Ne
  - 2000: Daijōbu (part of the Boys be... original soundtrack)
  - 2000: Genki no SHOWER (This song can also be found on the original Japanese Yu-Gi-Oh! anime soundtrack.)

=== Awards ===
  - 2001: Newcomer of the Year, Awards of the Japanese Academy: Battle Royale
