= Black Rat (film) =

2010 Japanese horror film

- English-language poster
- Directed by: Kenta Fukasaku
- Written by: Futoshi Fujita
- Produced by: Wakana Kanno; Jun Kubo
- Starring: Misaki Yonemura; Hiroya Matsumoto; Rina Saito
- Distributed by: Avex Management
- Release date: June 5, 2010 (Tokyo)
- Running time: 76 minutes
- Country: Japan
- Language: Japanese

Black Rat (Japanese: クロネズミ, Hepburn: Kuronezumi) is a 2010 Japanese slasher film directed by Kenta Fukasaku. It stars Misaki Yonemura, Hiroya Matsumoto, and Rina Saito. The film's plot follows six high school students who receive mysterious messages asking them to meet in a classroom at midnight, after which they are targeted by a figure wearing a schoolgirl uniform and a rat mask.

== Plot ==
High school student Asuka dies by suicide by jumping from the rooftop of her school wearing a rat mask. Forty-nine days later, six of Asuka's classmates—Misato, Kengo, Takashi, Ryota, Ryota's girlfriend Saki, and Kanako—receive text messages reading "Please come to classroom 3B at midnight tonight. I'll be waiting. Asuka". That night, Takashi, Ryota, Saki and Kanako gather in classroom 3B. At midnight, a figure wearing a schoolgirl uniform and a rat mask arrives. She writes the names of the six students on a chalkboard. Communicating through text written on notebook pages, she declares "Let's start the vengeance", and crosses Kengo's name off. She brings a blood-covered Kengo into the room, and announces that she will kill them.

Before Asuka's death, Asuka suggested to her six classmates that they perform a modern version of a traditional rat-themed dance for their school's cultural festival. Though Misato is supportive, the others are reluctant and are repelled by a rat mask Asuka had crafted for the performance. In the present, the masked figure drags Takashi outside and kills him with a metal baseball bat.

Kanako attempts to escape but is attacked by the figure with an electroshock weapon. Kanako awakens to find herself restrained to a chair. Her attacker challenges her to attain 100 points in a round of karaoke. It is revealed that, aside from Misato, Kanako and the other classmates had skipped Asuka's dance practice to do karaoke. When Misato and Asuka found them, they derided Asuka for always smiling. In the present, Kanako achieves a score of 52 points, and the figure electrocutes her to death.

Misato goes up to the rooftop, where she is confronted by the figure. Inside the school, Ryota and Saki encounter another person in a rat mask, armed with an axe. Ryota knocks off their mask to reveal Kengo. On the roof, the figure attacks Misato, and she trips her assailant down the stairs, causing them to land fatally on their own blade. Their mask is shed, revealing them to be Asuka's older sister Akane. After Asuka's suicide, Akane met with Kengo and enlisted him to help her get revenge on the others. In the present, Ryota dons the rat mask and bludgeons Kengo.

Saki, who had thrown Asuka's rat mask in the garbage in front of Asuka and Misato, encounters Misato, who is now wearing the mask. In the past, Kengo suggested to Ryota that Ryota should "clear things up with Asuka", but Ryota preferred to be with Saki. Misato asks Saki why she "stole her friend's boyfriend", and kills Saki with an axe. Ryota attempts to escape on his motor scooter, but the vehicle explodes, killing him. Misato sits down on the steps as emergency vehicles arrive.

== Cast ==
- Misaki Yonemura as Misato
- Hiroya Matsumoto as Ryota
- Rina Saito as Asuka
- Makoto Sakamoto as Takashi
- Rihoko Shimomiya
- Haruka Shimizu (清水春香)
- Mika Shimizu (清水美香)

== Release ==
Black Rat was screened on 5 June 2010 at the Human Trust Cinema Shibuya in Tokyo, Japan. The screening was accompanied by a stage greeting event, with director Kenta Fukasaku and actors Misaki Yonemura, Hiroya Matsumoto, Rina Saito, Makoto Sakamoto, and Rihoko Shimomiya present.
