= Kenta Fukasaku =

Japanese filmmaker and screenwriter (born 1972)

- Born: September 15, 1972 (age 52); Tokyo, Japan
- Occupation(s): Film director, screenwriter
- Parents: Kinji Fukasaku (father); Sanae Nakahara (mother)

Kenta Fukasaku (深作 健太, Fukasaku Kenta; born September 15, 1972) is a Japanese filmmaker and screenwriter. He is the son of film director Kinji Fukasaku and actress Sanae Nakahara.

== Biography ==
He made his writing debut in the popular Japanese cult film Battle Royale, which his father directed. He wrote the screenplay to the sequel, Battle Royale II: Requiem, and took over directing when his father died of cancer. The film was released in Japan during the winter of 2003.

In 2005, he directed a film called Under the Same Moon (同じツキみている, Onaji tsuki o miteiru) which starred Battle Royale's Tarō Yamamoto. His adaptation of the manga Sukeban Deka was released in 2006, under the title Yo-Yo Girl Cop. He also directed horror film X-Cross.

== Filmography ==
=== Actor ===
- The Challenge (1982)

=== Screenwriter ===
- Battle Royale (2000)
- Battle Royale II: Requiem (2003)

=== Director ===
- Battle Royale II: Requiem (2003)
- Under the Same Moon (2005)
- Yo-Yo Girl Cop (2006)
- X-Cross (2007)
- Rebellion: The Killing Isle (2008)
- Black Rat (2010)
- We Can't Change the World. But, We Wanna Build a School in Cambodia. (2011)
- My Summertime Map (2013)
- Ken to Merii: Ameagari no Yozora ni (2013)
