= Toire no Hanako-san (film) =

1995 Japanese horror film

Hanako-san of the Toilet
- Promotional release poster

Japanese name
- Kanji: トイレの花子さん
Transcriptions
- Revised Hepburn: Toire no Hanako-san
- Directed by: Jōji Matsuoka
- Written by: Takuro Fukuda; Jōji Matsuoka
- Produced by: Haruo Umekawa
- Starring: Takayuki Inoue; Ai Maeda; Yuka Kōno; Etsushi Toyokawa; Nene Ohtsuka
- Cinematography: Norimichi Kasamatsu
- Edited by: Yoshiyuki Okuhara
- Music by: Kuniaki Yagura; Kimitaka Matsumae
- Distributed by: Shochiku
- Release date: July 1, 1995 (Japan)
- Running time: 95 minutes
- Country: Japan
- Language: Japanese

Toire no Hanako-san (Japanese: トイレの花子さん) (English: Hanako-san of the Toilet), also known as School Mystery or Phantom of the Toilet, is a 1995 Japanese horror film directed by Jōji Matsuoka. Based on the Japanese urban legend of Hanako-san, the ghost of a young girl who haunts school bathrooms, the film stars Takayuki Inoue, Ai Maeda, Yuka Kōno, Etsushi Toyokawa, and Nene Ohtsuka.

== Plot ==
On her first day at a new school, a young transfer student named Saeko Mizuno is seen leaving the last stall in the girls' bathroom. Students at the school believe that a young girl named Hanako-san committed suicide in that stall, and that her ghost remains there. Since the students who believe in the Hanako-san legend avoid using that stall, rumors begin to spread that Mizuno is actually Hanako-san herself. Many of the students also believe that Hanako-san is responsible for a series of child homicides which have been occurring in the area around the school, and so they assume that Mizuno has come to their school in search of victims. The real murderer decapitates the school goat one day, which raises further suspicions against Mizuno, since she was the one appointed to feed the animal that day.

Wanting to see if Mizuno truly is Hanako-san, Mizuno's classmates decide to lock her in the last stall in the girls' bathroom overnight, surmising that, if she is still there in the morning, she must not be Hanako-san. Unbeknownst to Mizuno's classmates, the child killer is lurking around the school, and he eventually confronts Mizuno and one of her friends. The real Hanako-san appears, and is revealed to be a benevolent ghost. She summons a mob of students to the school, and they surround the killer, preventing him from escaping until the police and other adults arrive.

== Cast ==
- Takayuki Inoue as Takuya Sakamoto
- Ai Maeda as Natsumi Sakamoto
- Yuka Kōno as Saeko Mizuno
- Etsushi Toyokawa as Yuji Sakamoto
- Nene Ohtsuka as Yuriko Suzuki
- Chiaki Kuriyama as Little Child

== Critical reception ==
In his book Flowers from Hell: The Modern Japanese Horror Film, author Jim Harper writes: "Although it's difficult to imagine American or European parents allowing their offspring to watch a film in which young children are terrorized by a serial killer, Toire no Hanako-san is easily the best of the Japanese horror movies aimed at pre-teen audiences."
