= Linda Linda Linda =

2005 film by Nobuhiro Yamashita

- Theatrical release poster
- Directed by: Nobuhiro Yamashita
- Written by: Kōsuke Mukai; Wakako Miyashita; Nobuhiro Yamashita
- Produced by: Hiroyuki Negishi; Yuji Sadai; Haruo Okamoto
- Starring: Bae Doona; Aki Maeda; Yu Kashii; Shiori Sekine
- Cinematography: Yoshihiro Ikeuchi
- Edited by: Ryūji Miyajima
- Music by: James Iha
- Production companies: Bitters End; Covers&Co; VAP
- Distributed by: Bitters End
- Release date: July 23, 2005
- Running time: 114 minutes
- Country: Japan
- Language: Japanese
- Box office: $503,780

Linda Linda Linda (Japanese: リンダ リンダ リンダ, Hepburn: Rinda Rinda Rinda) is a 2005 Japanese comedy drama film directed by Nobuhiro Yamashita. It stars Bae Doona, Aki Maeda, Yu Kashii, and Shiori Sekine as teenage girls who form a band to cover songs by the Japanese punk rock band the Blue Hearts. It was rereleased in 4K restoration in 2025.

== Plot ==
Three days before their high school cultural festival, a school band need to find a replacement after their singer quits. They ask the first girl who walks by, Son, a Korean exchange student who is not fluent in Japanese. They call themselves Paranmaum and decide to cover Blue Hearts songs, including "Linda Linda".

The girls learn their parts. Son practices at a karaoke parlor, and Kyoko talks to her crush, Kazuya. The next day, the girls begin practicing early at school. Kyoko arrives late and they miss their time slot. However, Kei calls her ex-boyfriend, Maezano, and arranges time in his studio. They leave late at night to return to school and continue practicing through the night.

The girls help during the festival. Kei practices her guitar parts and talks to her rocker friend Takako. Son is supposed to help with the Japan–Korea culture exchange, but daydreams about the band. Kyoko sells crepes and Nozomi falls asleep on her bass guitar in a classroom.

Kei and Kyoko wake up Nozomi and fetch Son. Son rebuffs a confession of love from a schoolmate, Makihara. Over dinner at Nozomi's house, the girls reminisce and persuade Kyoko to talk to her crush, Kazuya, before the performance the next day. At school, they practice until early morning.

On the day of the performance, Paranmaum returns to the studio to practice. Exhausted, they fall asleep. Kei dreams about being celebrated and performing for the Ramones and Pierre Taki at the Nippon Budokan.

At the festival, the band's friends Moe and Takako perform "The Water Is Wide", "Subarashii Hibi (Wonderful Days)" by Unicorn, and "Furaibo (Wanderer)" by Happy End. Kei is woken by Kyoko's phone when Kazuya calls to ask where she is. The band rushes back to school in a taxi through the rain.

Kyoko meets Kazuya while the band sets up minutes before their performance. When Kyoko arrives, the band performs "Linda Linda" and "Owaranai Uta" to an excited crowd.

== Cast ==
- Bae Doona as Son, a Korean exchange student and the vocalist of Paranmaum
- Aki Maeda as Kyoko Yamada, the drummer of Paranmaum
- Yuu Kashii as Kei Tachibana, the guitarist of Paranmaum
- Shiori Sekine as Nozomi Shirakawa, the bassist of Paranmaum
- Takayo Mimura as Rinko Marumoto, the former vocalist of the girls' band
- Shione Yukawa as Moe Imamura, the former guitarist of the girls' band
- Yuko Yamazaki as Takako Nakajima, Kei's rocker friend
- Kenichi Matsuyama as Makihara, a schoolboy who has a crush on Son
- Katsuya Kobayashi as Kazuya Oe, Kyoko's crush
- Keisuke Koide as Abe, the leader of the school music club
- Lily as Kei's mother
- Masaki Miura as Tomoki Maezono, Kei's ex-boyfriend
- Masahiro Komoto as Koyama, the teacher in charge of the music club

== Soundtrack ==
The soundtrack was released on July 20, 2005. The original instrumental tracks were composed by James Iha of the Smashing Pumpkins. The vocal tracks include Paranmaum (the band from the film) singing covers of the Blue Hearts songs "Linda Linda", "Boku no Migite (My Right Hand)" and "Owaranai Uta (Never Ending Song)". Kashii and Maeda learned to play their instruments specially for this movie. There are also two songs by Base Ball Bear (the band Shiori Sekine belongs to in reality); they are "Sayonara Nostalgia" and "April Mirage". These two songs can be heard playing in the "crêpe shop" scenes featuring Kyoko and Oe Kazuya. Shione Yukawa (who plays Moe Imamura in the movie) and Yuko Yamazaki (from the band me-ism) also perform a few songs on stage at the festival itself. The band, Paranmaum (Korean for "the Blue Hearts"), released a CD single in Japan and South Korea, We Are Paranmaum.

== Release ==
The first US release, from Viz Media, was on November 10, 2006. An English-subtitled DVD was released on May 8, 2007. In 2025, the 4K restoration of Linda Linda Linda premiered at the Tribeca Festival on June 8 and was released in cinemas in Japan on August 22, and thereafter in other countries.

== Reception ==
On the review aggregator website Rotten Tomatoes, 83% of 12 critics' reviews are positive, with an average rating of 7/10. Metacritic, which uses a weighted average, assigned Linda Linda Linda a score of 74 out of 100, based on six critics, indicating "generally favorable" reviews. It was David Ehrlich's choice for IndieWire's 2018 list of the best Japanese films of the 21st century. He wrote that it was less profound than films such as Spirited Away (2001), Millennium Actress (2001), and Nobody Knows (2004), but "euphorically fun [...] so rich, so charismatic, and so damn catchy, you'll be itching to show it to all your friends". Reviewing the rerelease in 2025, the New York Times critic J. Hoberman praised Linda Linda Linda as "sweet but uncloying" and wrote that its "unobtrusive filmmaking is worthy of attention".
