= Gamera 3: Revenge of Iris =

1999 film by Shūsuke Kaneko

- Theatrical release poster

Japanese name
- Kanji: ガメラ3 邪神〈イリス〉覚醒
Transcriptions
- Revised Hepburn: Gamera Surī Irisu Kakusei
- Directed by: Shusuke Kaneko
- Written by: Kazunori Itō; Shusuke Kaneko
- Produced by: Miyuki Nanri; Naoki Sato; Tsutomu Tsuchikawa
- Starring: Shinobu Nakayama; Ai Maeda; Yukijiro Hotaru
- Cinematography: Junichi Tozawa
- Edited by: Isao Tomita
- Music by: Kow Otani
- Production company: Daiei Film
- Distributed by: Toho
- Release date: March 6, 1999 (Japan)
- Running time: 108 minutes
- Country: Japan
- Language: Japanese
- Box office: $15 million

Gamera 3: Revenge of Iris (ガメラ3 邪神〈イリス〉覚醒, Gamera Surī Irisu Kakusei; lit. 'Gamera 3: Evil God Iris Awakens') (Note: Also known as Gamera 3: Awakening of Irys) is a 1999 Japanese kaiju film directed by Shusuke Kaneko, with special effects by Shinji Higuchi. Produced by Daiei Film and distributed by Toho, the film is the 11th entry in the Gamera film series, as well as the third film in the franchise's Heisei period, serving as a sequel to the 1996 film Gamera 2: Attack of Legion .

The film stars Ai Maeda as Ayana Hirasaka, a young girl who forms a psychic bond with a parasitic creature known as Iris that feeds upon the hatred that she feels for the giant turtle monster Gamera, who had unwittingly killed Ayana's parents and cat. The film also features Shinobu Nakayama and Ayako Fujitani reprising their roles as Mayumi Nagamine and Asagi Kusanagi, respectively. Hirofumi Fukuzawa portrays Gamera, while Akira Ohashi, who played Gamera in the previous film, portrays Iris.

Gamera 3: Revenge of Iris was screened at the 1999 Toronto International Film Festival, and received the Mainichi Film Concours award for Best Sound Recording in Japan. The film received generally positive reviews, with the film's special effects being lauded, and with many praising it as being one of the best entries in the Gamera film series.

However its popularity and tragic plot especially the portrayal of Gamera to be an unintentional threat to humanity also caused downward effects on the franchise indirectly, resulting in cancellations of subsequent projects (including sequels to the Heisei trilogy and the 2006 film Gamera the Brave respectively), taking 17 years for Kadokawa Corporation to produce Gamera Rebirth (2023), the first major installation since Gamera the Brave.

A documentary video about the film's production entitled GAMERA1999 was directed by Masayuki and Hideaki Anno.

== Plot ==
Three years have passed since Gamera defeated the Legion, (Note: As depicted in Gamera 2: Attack of Legion. (1996)) and the world is once again plagued by the Gyaos, which have now evolved into Hyper Gyaos. Mayumi Nagamine, noted ornithologist, returns to aid the Japanese government in addressing this threat. At the bottom of the Pacific Ocean, a graveyard of Gamera fossils is found. Meanwhile, two government agents, occultist Mito Asakura and Kurata Shinya, are working with a different agenda, with Asakura believing Gamera to be an evil spirit. At Shibuya, Gamera fights and kills a pair of attacking Hyper Gyaos with little regard for humans, resulting in around 20,000 people being killed in the crossfire. Following the incident, the Japanese government orders Gamera's destruction.

Meanwhile, a teenage girl named Ayana Hirasaka, whose parents were inadvertently killed by Gamera during his previous battle with Super Gyaos in 1995, (Note: As depicted in Gamera: Guardian of the Universe. (1995)) discovers a stone egg sealed within the temple of Asuka. The egg hatches a tentacled mutant creature known as the “Ryu-sei-cho”, who Ayana names "Iris" after her deceased pet cat. Ayana forms a link with Iris through an orichalcum magatama amulet, and plans to raise Iris to take vengeance against Gamera. However, as Iris grows larger, he attempts to absorb her. Ayana's classmate, Tatsunari Moribe, manages to free her from Iris's cocoon with a sacred dagger, but Iris later massacres and consumes half the citizens of Asuka, subsequently growing into his adult form.

The JGSDF attempts to destroy Iris, but fails after Iris flies toward Kyoto, where Ayana has been taken by Asakura and Kurata, who plan to use Ayana to summon Iris. En route, Iris attempts to kill two JASDF F-15J Eagle pilots tasked with intercepting the monster, but Gamera comes to the rescue and engages Iris in battle. Gamera is struck and slowed down by a Patriot surface-to-air missile launcher, inadvertently allowing Iris to escape. At Kyoto Station, Nagamine and Asagi Kusanagi, a teenager once psychically linked with Gamera, attempt to extract Ayana out of Kyoto, when a typhoon hits the city. Kurata speculates that Gamera was engineered as humanity's guardian, and can be charged with humanity's collective "mana", and theorizes Iris was similarly created to defeat Gamera so the Gyaos could wipe out the human race. While rejecting Kurata's misanthropy, Nagamine and Asagi think his theory explains how Gamera got the energy he used to defeat Legion.

Iris makes his way to Kyoto Station, continuing his duel with Gamera. Iris impales Gamera with one of his tentacles and severely damages the station concourse, killing Asakura and Kurata. Moribe briefly distracts Iris with the dagger, but Iris ultimately absorbs Ayana. From within Iris's body, Ayana experiences his memories, realizing her hatred and anger motivated him. As she has this epiphany, Gamera plunges his hand into Iris' chest, pulling Ayana free and robbing Iris of his human link. As Asagi rescues Nagamine, Iris impales Gamera's hand and begins processing his DNA. Gamera blasts off his injured arm, absorbing Iris's fireballs and forming a fiery plasma fist, which he drives into Iris, destroying him.

Setting a comatose Ayana down, Gamera awakens her with a roar after Nagamine and Asagi fail to revive her, leaving her mystified by Gamera's forgiveness. As a swarm of Hyper Gyaos begins to converge on Japan, the JSDF recognises that Gamera is on the side of humanity and pledge to fight the swarm alongside him. Asagi states that despite the fact she no longer shares a psychic link with Gamera, she knows he will fight to the end. As the swarm approaches, Gamera defiantly roars at the center of Kyoto.

== Cast ==
- Shinobu Nakayama as Mayumi Nagamine, an ornithologis who is intrigued by Gamera and forms a partnership with Asagi and one of the film's main protagonists.
- Ai Maeda as Ayana Hirasaka, a tormented young schoolgirl whose parents were unintentionally killed by Gamera's previous feud with Super Gyaos and one of the film's main protagonists.
  - Aki Maeda portrays Ayana in the flashback.
- Ayako Fujitani as Asagi Kusanagi, Gamera's former human companion, who sacrificed their bond during his fight with Legion and the film's secondary protagonist.
- Senri Yamasaki as Mito Asakura, a sadistic woman who believes that Gamera is an evil spirit bent on destruction.
- Toru Tezuka as Shinya Kurata, a mysterious man who claims to be a descendant of the advanced civilization that created Gamera and Gyaos.
- Yuu Koyama as Tatsunari Moribe, classmate of Ayana whose family has long guarded the shrine where the Iris entity was imprisoned.
- Takasaki Nayami as Takoshi, the colonel of the Japanese Self-Defense Force.
- Hakosaki Sato as the general of the Japanese Self-Defense Force.
- Kenji Soto as Dr. Sato
- Yukijirō Hotaru as Osako, former Fukuoka police officer.
- Yūsuke Kawazu as Akio Nojiri
- Hirotarō Honda as Masaaki Saitō
- Masahiko Tsugawa as the lieutenant general of Japan Air Self-Defense Force.
- Kei Horie as Shigeki Hinohara, Ayana's cousin.
- Yukie Nakama as the female camper who got killed by Iris
- Norman England as a man running at Kyoto Station
- Hirofumi Fukuzawa as Gamera, the titular turtle-like monster and one of the film's main protagonists.
- Akira Ohashi as Iris, a mutant Gyaos that must feed on bodily fluids to survive and the film's main antagonist.
  - Ohashi also portrays Gamera in the flashback.

== Production ==
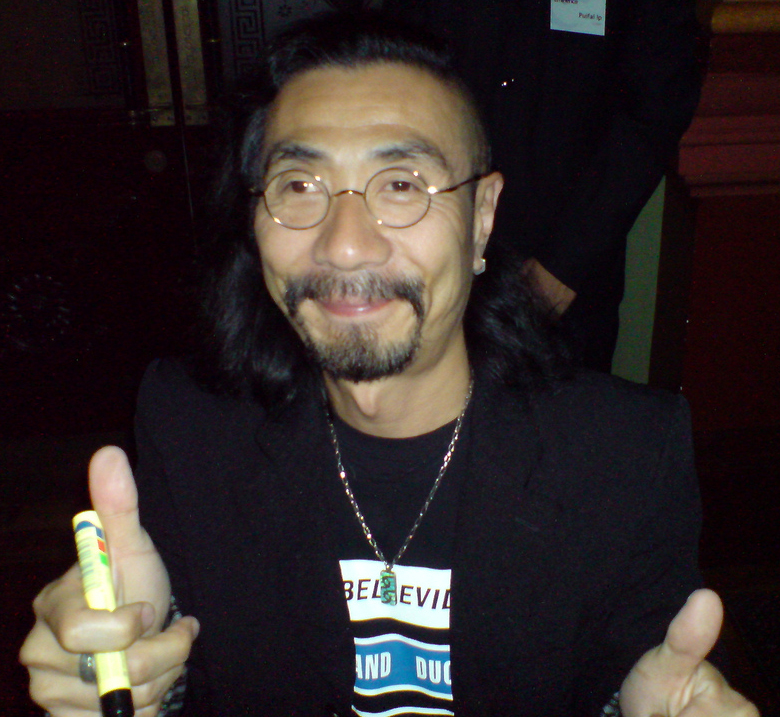
Composer Kow Otani (pictured) has composed the music for all three Gamera films directed by Shusuke Kaneko.

Its production was delayed and the film plot was intentionally designed as a horror because of box office results of 1995 and 1996 films, declined popularity of kaiju genre, and contrasting popularity of horror films among children at that time where especially Ring and Ghosts at School and Honto ni atta kowai hanashi franchises had influences on Gamera 3: Revenge of Iris.

Many members of the crew who worked on Gamera 3: Revenge of Iris had previous work in the Gamera film series. Director Shusuke Kaneko directed both Gamera the Guardian of the Universe (1995) and Gamera 2: Attack of Legion (1996). Gamera 3 marks the first Gamera film that Kaneko had screenwriting credits on as he co-wrote the film with Kazunori Ito who had previously written the previous two 1990s Gamera films. The music composer Kow Otani and special effects director Shinji Higuchi was also a regular with the series, previously working on both films.

The final draft of the film included several references to previous non-Gamera films by Daiei Film such as the 1962 Daiel film The Whale God (Killer Whale) where a scene for Gamera to encounter a pair of North Pacific right whales was planned.

The plot for Gamera to sacrifice his right arm was inspired by the 1972 film One-Armed Boxer.

== Release ==
Gamera 3: Revenge of Iris was released in Japan on March 6, 1999. The film grossed over $15,000,000 on its release. The film had its North American premiere at G-Fest in 1999 and was also shown at the 1999 Toronto Film Festival. The film did not have a wide release in North America and was released direct-to-video on DVD on June 10, 2003, by ADV Films. The film was released on Blu-ray by Mill Creek Entertainment on September 27, 2011.

Gamera 3: Revenge of Iris was followed up by Gamera the Brave directed by Ryuta Tasaki in 2006. The film's plot ignores the events of the three films directed by Kaneko.

== Reception ==
According to A.D. Vision in 2000, the film was "hailed by fans and critics alike as the greatest giant monster film ever made". In Japan, Gamera 3: Revenge of Iris won the award for Best Sound Recording at the 54th Mainichi Film Concours ceremony.

Western reviewers praised the film as one of the best in the Gamera series, commenting on the special effects in the film. Variety stated the film was "somewhat more elaborate" and "grittier and hipper" than Gamera the Guardian of the Universe (1995) and Gamera 2: Attack of Legion (1996) as well stating that the monster Gamera appeared "more threatening". Variety also described the special effects in the film as "good by model/miniature/animated standards" but felt that were not up to the standards of American special effects. The San Francisco Chronicle felt the film's plot was similar to an episode of The X-Files and praised the special effects in the film opining that "The special effects are terrific, although the monsters still look like guys in rubber suits. Fans of the genre wouldn't have it any other way."

Film critic Tom Mes referred to the film as the best Gamera film to date, opining that the film "delivers everything a movie about huge, fighting, city-stomping monsters should have: excitement, slam-bang action sequences, beautifully designed creatures, and yes, even stunning special effects" Time felt that the film was stronger than Gamera 2: Attack of Legion, stating the film is stronger "because it has much less Gamera; there's only so much character richness, let alone fun, to be found in shell, teeth, eyes, claws, scales, etc. But the movie has thrills for those who need 'em. Toward the end, a young scientist faces Iris and his doom and, a moment before he dies, screams like a cheerleader at his own immolation: "Oh boy, is this scary? Yes!" I second that notion."

== Legacy ==
Continuation of the series after Gamera 3: Revenge of Iris was cancelled as afore-mentioned, however the plot of the scrapped "G4" was later re-used for the 2003 independent film, GAMERA 4-TRUTH by Shinpei Hayashiya.

In 2023, critically acclaimed filmmaker Takashi Yamazaki stated that Godzilla's destruction in his film Godzilla Minus One are inspired by Shinji Higuchi's special effects from Gamera 3: Revenge of Iris. That same year, Gamera 3 director Shusuke Kaneko revealed his plans to make a new Gamera film at a screening of his film Godzilla, Mothra and King Ghidorah: Giant Monsters All-Out Attack (2001), which he attended with Yamazaki. Kaneko joked that "Maybe Gamera will attack Pearl Harbor"; Yamazaki responded to Kaneko by saying "I want to see Gamera 4. If you call me, I'll help you out a bit!".

== See also ==
- List of films featuring giant monsters
- List of Japanese films of 1999
- List of science fiction films of the 1990s
- Godzilla: King of the Monsters (2019 film)
