= Haruka Suenaga =

Japanese actress

- 末永 遥
- Born: July 22, 1986 (age 39); Kanagawa, Japan
- Occupation: Actress
- Years active: 1991–present
- Height: 162 cm (5 ft 4 in)
- Spouse: Hiroshi Izumi (m. 2014)
- Children: 2

Haruka Suenaga (末永 遥, Suenaga Haruka; born July 22, 1986) is a Japanese actress. At a young age, she began making TV appearances on Oha Suta and was part of the Oha-Girls. She has done some commercials for Glico. One of her most notable roles was Sakura Nishihori/Bouken Pink in the Super Sentai series GoGo Sentai Boukenger.

== Personal life ==
On February 22, 2014, Suenaga announced that she had married Olympic judo medalist Hiroshi Izumi.

== Filmography ==
=== Movies ===
- Rex Kyouryuu monogatari (1993)
- Nihon-ichi Mijikai "Haha" e no tegami (1995)
- Kokkuri (1997)
- Battle Royale II: Requiem (2003)
- GoGo Sentai Boukenger the Movie: The Most Powerful Precious(2006)
- GoGo Sentai Boukenger vs. Super Sentai (2007)
- Life (2007)
- Juken Sentai Gekiranger vs. Boukenger (2008)
- Shibatora (2008) as Rika Machida
