= Ai Maeda (actress) =

Japanese actress, singer and model (born 1983)

- 前田 愛
- Born: October 4, 1983 (age 42); Tokyo, Japan
- Education: Aoyama Gakuin University
- Occupations: Singer, actress, model
- Years active: 1993–present
- Agent: Granpapa Production
- Spouse: Nakamura Kankurō VI (m. 2009)
- Children: 2
- Relatives: Aki Maeda (sister)
- Musical career
- Genres: Japanese Pop, R&B
- Instrument: Vocals
- Label: Pony Canyon
- Website: granpapa.com/1251277177523/

Ai Maeda (前田 愛, Maeda Ai; born October 4, 1983 in Tokyo) is a Japanese actress, singer and model.

== Biography ==
Maeda is notable for performing Shiori Kitano in the 2003 film Battle Royale II: Requiem, as well as for voicing the title role in the anime series Kino's Journey (for which she also performed a theme song to the series, "The Beautiful World"). Her younger sister is Aki Maeda. Ai Maeda came into the spotlight when she was only 8 years old, appearing in a McDonald's commercial. From there her career started off. She modeled along with her sister Aki Maeda when they were young until she was 16/17 years old, when she starred in many movies and TV series.

Maeda is skilled in the piano, Tate (fighting battles on the movie set) and the English language (Ai studied abroad in Canada for a year in 2000). She starred in the 3-D Ghost horror film Shock Labyrinth 3D, which was directed by Takashi Shimizu.

She is a graduate of Aoyama Gakuin University (Faculty of Economics, International Politics and Communications).

On October 28, 2009, Maeda married Kabuki actor Nakamura Kankurō VI and they have two sons.

== Career ==
- 1993: Debuted in a McDonald's commercial together with her sister Aki Maeda. She was in her fourth year of primary school.
- 1994: Ai and Aki joined the manager firm "Crayon".
- 1994 April: Became a regular cast of the show Appare-Sanma Sensei.
- 1997: Changed manager to "Granpapa".
- 1997: Formed the group "Pretty Chat" with Maya Hamaoka, Yuuka Nomura and Ayako Omura, releasing a single album "Wake up girls".
- 2003: On her 20th birthday she voiced her first anime Kino no Tabi.

== Filmography ==
Year	Title	Role	Note
1995	Toire no Hanako-san	Natsumi Sakamoto	
1998	Belle Epoque		
1998	Shinsei Toire no Hanako-san	Satomi Kurahashi	
1999	Gamera 3: Revenge of Iris	Ayana Hirasaka	
2000	Battle Royale	Shiori Kitano	Voice role
2001	Godzilla, Mothra and King Ghidorah: Giant Monsters All-Out Attack	Twin girl	
2003	Battle Royale II: Requiem	Shiori Kitano	
2003	Gūzen nimo saiaku na shōnen	Female college student	
2004	Kino's Journey: In Order to Do Something –Life Goes On–	Kino	Voice role
2005	Azumi 2: Death or Love	Chiyo	
2005	Gokudō no onna-tachi: Jōen		
2006	Death Note 2: The Last Name	Ayako Yoshino	
2006	God's Left Hand, Devil's Right Hand	Yoshiko	
2006	Kamyu nante shiranai	Kiyoko Hisada	
2006	Nihon Chinbotsu	Nurse	
2006	Taitei no Ken		
2007	Kino's Journey: Country of Illness -For You-	Kino	Voice role
2007	Saiban'in -Eraba re, soshite miete kita mono	Emi Onuma	
2007	The Yakiniku Movie Bulgogi	Yakiniku Battle Royale Reporter	
2009	Asahiyama Zoo Story: Penguins in the Sky	Makoto Ogawa	
2009	The Shock Labyrinth	Rin	
2010	King Game		
2010	Nanase Futatabi: The Movie	Mayumi Ruri	
2010	Wakiyaku Monogatari	Sakura	

== Discography ==
=== Mini-albums ===
- Night Fly [2005.03.16]

=== Singles ===
- the Beautiful World

The title track was used in Kino's Journey ending theme
