= Kanji Suzumori =

Japanese voice actor

Kanji Suzumori (鈴森 勘司, Suzumori Kanji; born April 1, 1974) is a Japanese voice actor from Aichi, Japan and is attached to Office Kaoru.

== Voice roles ==
- Shaman King (2001), Free Day; Silver Horn
- Strawberry Eggs (2001), Girl (ep 12)
- Chobits (2002), Bamboo Pole Seller (ep 15); Salaryman (ep 1)
- The Twelve Kingdoms (2002), Man 1 (Ep 4)
- Darker than Black (2007), Man (ep 21)
- Noramimi (2008), Shigeru's Father (ep 11); Yocchan's Father (ep 6)
- Shigofumi: Letters from the Departed (2008), Store keeper (ep 4)
- Stitch! (2008), Mr. Suzuki
- Toshokan Sensō (2008), Ryusuke Genda
- The Tower of Druaga: The Aegis of Uruk (2008), Ambu
- Naruto: Shippuden (2009), Tetsuru; Taiseki; Tsukushi; Ginji
- Umi Monogatari (2009), Tabata-san
- Cat Planet Cuties (2010), Endō
- Appleseed XIII (2011), Reese
- Mushibugyo (2013), Tokugawa Yoshimune

Unknown date

- Adult Education ~Shinshi Choukyou~ as Adachi

=== Dubbing ===
==== Live-action ====
- Moon, Thompson (Benedict Wong)

==== Animation ====
- Chuggington, Harrison
- T.U.F.F. Puppy, Chief
