= Koushun Takami =

Japanese author and journalist

Kōshun Takami 高見 広春
- Born: 高見宏治 (Takami Hiroharu); 10 January 1969 (age 57); Amagasaki, Hyōgo, Japan
- Education: Osaka University
- Occupations: Author, journalist
- Writing career
- Language: Japanese
- Genres: Fiction, journalism
- Notable work: Battle Royale

Kōshun Takami (高見 広春, Takami Kōshun; born 10 January 1969) is a Japanese author and journalist. He is best known for his 1999 novel Battle Royale, which was later adapted into two live-action films, directed by Kinji Fukasaku, and four manga series.

Takami was born on 10 January 1969 in Amagasaki, Hyōgo Prefecture near Osaka and grew up in the Kagawa Prefecture of Shikoku. After graduating from Osaka University with a degree in literature, he dropped out of Nihon University's liberal arts correspondence course program. From 1991 to 1996, he worked for the news company Shikoku Shimbun, reporting on various fields including politics, police reports, and economics.

Kōshun Takami was born Hiroharu Takami (高見宏治, Takami Hiroharu). His new given name is a play on word on his original one. Hiroharu is a homophone of ''large spring''. The author then adopted the kanjis 広春 (large spring) and used their on'yomi pronunciation to form his new name: Kōshun.

Battle Royale was completed after Takami left the news company. It was rejected in the final round of the 1997 literary competition Japan Grand Prix Horror Novel, due to its controversial content depicting Junior High School children forced to kill one another. When finally published in April 1999, it went on to become a bestseller, and only a year later was made into both a manga and a feature film.

The novel was translated into English by Yuji Oniki and published by Viz Media in 2003. An expanded English edition was later published by Haika Soru, a division of Viz Media, in 2009. The first manga also began being released in English in 2003, by Tokyopop, with the last volume published in 2006. As well as being critically acclaimed, the Battle Royale series has become infamous not only in Japan, but around the world and has earned cult status.

Since Battle Royale, Takami has not released any work.
