= Base Ball Bear =

Japanese rock band

- Also known as: BBB, Bebobe
- Origin: Tokyo, Japan
- Genres: Alternative rock; Pop rock; New wave
- Years active: 2001—present
- Labels: Blitz Pia Records (2003–2005); EMI Music Japan (2006–2013); EMI Records Japan (2013–2019); Victor Entertainment (2019–present)
- Members: Yūsuke Koide; Shiori Sekine; Daisuke Horinouchi
- Past members: Shōhei Yuasa
- Website: baseballbear.com

Base Ball Bear is a Japanese rock band from Tokyo that made its major debut in 2006 with EMI Music Japan. Although assembled in autumn 2001, the band formally began in 2002, and started off with self-produced releases.

Their style influences include Japanese indie rock bands Number Girl and Supercar, and British rock bands such as Oasis. They have been noted for the "nostalgic" feel of band leader Yūsuke Koide's lyrics, often about teenage life and memories. Base Ball Bear are also known for their contributions to the soundtrack of the movie Linda Linda Linda (in which bassist Shiori Sekine had a leading role) and performing the themes to the anime series Toshokan Sensō, Ōkiku Furikabutte and Gintama.

The band, initially named Planet, was formed for a one-time performance at a high school culture festival, but decided to continue due to how well-received they were and the fun they had at the festival. The name Planet had likely come from the Supercar song of the same name, and the band's current name also derives partially from a song name. Koide had thought of Japanese singer Chocolat's song "Base Ball and Elvis Presley" and suggested the name "Base Ball". Guitarist Shohei Yuasa thought it would be better if one more word was added to it, and the rest of the band agreed, eventually settling on the word "bear".

In 2016, the band announced the departure of Shohei Yuasa and that they would continue with 3 members.

== History ==
=== Formation and early years ===
Koide originally assembled the band in 2001 under the name "Planet," to perform at their high school's fall festival. They performed covers of the songs OOYeah!! and OOKeah!! by the band Supercar. Following their festival performance, they decided to continue with the band as a hobby.

In March 2002, the band formally assembled. In April they began sending demo tapes to record labels, whereupon they were advised by Toshiba EMI to change their name. They eventually chose "Base Ball Bear," the name under which they performed their first gig at Shimokitazawa Garage that July. Throughout the rest of the year, they continued playing in the Shibuya and Shimokitazawa areas of Tokyo as their fan base began to grow.

In November 2003, Base Ball Bear signed with Blitz Pia Records, an independent label. They immediately released their first mini-album Yūgata Generation on 26 November. The band released its first single, Yume is Vision, in April of the following year. It was the first of the band's songs to be accompanied by a music video, which was created in collaboration with Yūki, a Japanese fashion magazine model and Base Ball Bear fan. The band spent the rest of 2004 practicing and writing new songs, some of where were featured on compilation CDs.

The band released its first full-length album, High Color Times, on 16 March 2005, and started playing concerts to sold-out crowds in larger venues. Also, Shiori Sekine was cast in one of the lead roles in the film Linda Linda Linda, which featured some of the band's music.

=== Major debut and increasing popularity ===
Base Ball Bear signed with EMI Music Japan in January 2006, and immediately released an introductory album, Band B ni Tsuite, on 12 January. Although they had previously released another version of Band B ni Tsuite on 14 October 2005, this new release included one new song and other remastering. They then played on the "Nyakunyaku Nannyo Summer Tour" with Chatmonchy and Snowkel and released their first major album, C, on 29 October.

Their first solo tour "Live by the C" took place in the spring of 2007. Over the course of the year, they released four more singles, as well as their second major album, Jūnanasai. Their live performances included the Rock in Japan Festival, another round on the "Nyakunyaku Nannyo Summer Tour", and the "B-Pop High School Tour".

In 2008, the band went on a solo tour called "17-sai Kara Yattemasu Tour" that ran from the middle to the end of March. Their first single of the year, Changes, was released on 8 May 2008, and was the ending theme to the Production I.G anime series Toshokan Sensō. The band then made its first appearance on the popular music program Music Station on 9 May and performed Changes on the show. Base Ball Bear also performed a two-day show at Shibuya C.C. Lemon Hall in late September.

In January 2009, they released their eighth single Love Mathematics and a compilation album Kanzenban Band B ni Tsuite containing all their indies songs. Following the releases, the band went on a tour called "Live Mathematics Tour 2009" starting in March. They also held a show named "Hibiya Nonfiction" at Hibiya Open-Air Concert Hall on 27 June. With a total of four singles in 2009, the band closed out the year by releasing their third album (What Is The) Love & Pop? in September and achieving ninth place on the Oricon Weekly Albums Chart. It was their first album to reach the top ten, and they held a five-venue tour at Zepp halls to promote the album.

Base Ball Bear managed their first solo concert at the Nippon Budokan on 3 January 2010, titled "Live;(This Is The) Base Ball Bear".

=== Departure of Shohei Yuasa ===
In 2016, also the band's 10th anniversary of debut and their 15th year together, it was announced that guitarist Shohei Yuasa would be leaving the band. According to their management agency, since mid-February that year, Yuasa had been uncontactable and did not turn up at the studio when they were scheduled for production work. He then declared his intention through a third party that he was unable to continue his activities in Base Ball Bear. After that, the staff and members tried to contact Yuasa directly for several days but no one managed to reach him.

On 27 February, Base Ball Bear went through with a scheduled appearance at a festival with the remaining 3 members, announcing that Yuasa could not participate as he was not well. However, with the band's own tour "Live By The C2" due to kick off on 5 March, the agency had no choice but to make the decision public on 2 March that it would be difficult for them to continue as four. The tour would instead have ex-Doping Panda member Yutaka Furukawa perform as a support guitarist.

To this, the band's members and staff felt unable to comprehend the situation and expressed regret. Vocalist Koide said that they had spent more than half their lives together and it was "very regretful" that Yuasa would leave the band. Horinouchi said it was "vexing" because he had believed the band would be 4 members "for 20 or even 30 years." Having taken for granted that they would always be four, he could not understand why this had happened and "even feels anger." Bassist Sekine said that she was "extremely bewildered at first by this sudden development", and that she had never thought about anyone leaving. She expressed that she was uneasy that something precious to her had "crumbled", but no matter what she wanted to continue Base Ball Bear, and Koide and Horinouchi felt the same.

== Band members ==
Current

- Yūsuke Koide (小出 祐介, Koide Yūsuke)
  - Born 9 December 1984, in Edogawa, Tokyo
  - Vocalist and guitarist
  - Primary lyricist and composer of the band's music
- Shiori Sekine (関根 史織, Sekine Shiori)
  - Born 8 December 1985, in Saitama Prefecture (youngest member)
  - Bassist and backing vocalist
  - The only female member and had no experience playing bass before joining
  - Also bassist of Paranmaum band from the 2005 movie Linda Linda Linda
- Daisuke Horinouchi (堀之内 大介, Horinouchi Daisuke)
  - Born 17 January 1985, in Tokyo
  - Drummer and chorus

Past

- Shōhei Yuasa (湯浅 将平, Yuasa Shōhei)
  - Born 16 April 1984, in Chiba Prefecture
  - Guitarist
  - Favorite artists include Thee Michelle Gun Elephant and Sly & the Family Stone

== Discography ==
=== Self-produced works ===
| Title | Release Date |
|---|---|
| Mae: Front (前－front－, Front: Front) Track list: 1. My Generation (マイジェネレーション); 2. Wave; 3. November; JHS (ノーベンバー；JHS); 4. Pureway; 5. Sky High (スカイハイ) | 2002-07 |
| Ushiro: Back (後－back－, Back: Back) Track list: 1. Hope; 2. Rainpark; 3. Evilway; 4. 89; 5. Boy | 2002-07 |
| Change Up (チェンジアップ) Track list: 1. Change Up (チェンジアップ) | 2002-09 |
| White Twilight (ホワイトワイライト) Track list: 1. White Twilight (ホワイトワイライト); 2. November: JHS (ノーベンバー：JHS); 3. Planetarium (プラネタリウム); 4. Slogan (スローガン); 5. My Generation (マイジェネレーション) (acoustic version) | 2002-10 |
| School Life (スクールライフ) Track list: 1. School Life (スクールライフ) | 2002-11 |
| HR Track list: 1. HR; 2. School Life (スクールライフ); 3. Slogan (スローガン) | 2003-03 |
| Yume Is Vision Track list: 1. Yume Is Vision (Dream Is Vision) | 2003-06 |
| Yume/Sayonara Track list: 1. Yume Is Vision (Dream Is Vision); 2. Sayonara-Nostalgia (Goodbye Nostalgia) | 2003-10 |

=== Indies ===
==== Singles ====
| Title | Release Date |
|---|---|
| Yume Is Vision Track list: 1. Yume Is Vision (Dream is Vision); 2. Kimi no Speed-kan (君のスピード感 Your Sense of Speed); 3. Tokyo Pyramid (東京ピラミッド); 4. Doppelgänger Graduation (ドッペルゲンガー・グラジュエーション) | 2004-07-07 |
| B Beginning!! Split single with Japanese band Bacon. Track list: 2. April Mirage; 4. Tragic Heroine | 2004-12-24 |

==== Albums ====
| Title | Release Date |
|---|---|
| Yūgata Generation (夕方ジェネレーション, Evening Generation) Track list: 1. Sayonara-Nostalgia (Goodbye Nostalgia); 2. Tsuyogari Shōjo (つよがり少女 Show-of-Force Girl); 3. Metamorphosis Massaichū (メタモルフォーぜ真っ最中 Right in the Middle of Metamorphosis); 4. Binetsu Boy (微熱ボーイ Low Fever Boy); 5. Sunset-KI･RE･I (Sunset: Beau-Ti-Ful); 6. Yūgata Generation (夕方ジェネレーション Evening Generation); 7. Boy Meets Girl | 2003-11-26 |
| High Color Times Track list: 1. Gokusaishiki Imagination (極彩色イマジネイション A Vivid Imagination); 2. April Mirage; 3. Kūhi Ganbō (空飛願望 Aspiring to Fly); 4. Himawari no Jūnigatsu (向日葵の12月 Sunflower's December); 5. Shirayuki no Kanojo (白雪の彼女 Snow White Girl); 6. Umi ni Naritai (海になりたい I Want to Become the Sea); 7. Aimai Memories (Unclear Memories); 8. Satellite Town ni te (サテライト・タウンにて In Satellite Town); 9. Kimi Iro no Machi (君色の街 A Town of Your Color); 10. Kage Nai Futari (翳ない2人 A Shadowless Couple); 11. Kareshi Kanojo no Kankei (彼氏彼女の関係 Boyfriend-Girlfriend Relationship); 12. High Color Times | 2005-03-16 |
| Band B ni Tsuite (バンドBについて, About Band B) Exclusively sold at live venues. Track list: 1. Crazy for You no Kisetsu (CRAZY FOR YOUの季節 The Season I'm Crazy for You); 2. Gokusaishiki Imagination (極彩色イマジネイション A Vivid Imagination); 3. Satellite Town ni te (サテライト・タウンにて In Satellite Town); 4. Kareshi Kanojo no Kankei (彼氏彼女の関係 Boyfriend-Girlfriend Relationship); 5. Yume is Vision (Dream is Vision); 6. Yūgata Generation (夕方ジェネレーション Evening Generation); 7. Sayonara-Nostalgia (Goodbye Nostalgia); 8. Girl of Arms | 2005-10-14 |

==== Various artist compilations ====
| Title | Release Date |
|---|---|
| Hi-Style vol.7 Grip: 9. Shōjo to Nue (少女と鵺 A Girl and a Nue) (demo version) | 2004 |
| Suteki Compilation (素敵コンピレイション, Wonderful Compilation): 9. Sayonara-Nostalgia | 2004-01-21 |
| D Seldom Sono 9 (D★SELDOM其9, D Seldom No.9) 2-8. Sayonara-Nostalgia | 2004-07-28 |
| Linda Linda Linda Original Movie Soundtrack: 7. April Mirage; 9. Sayonara-Nostalgia | 2005-07-20 |

=== Major label ===
==== Singles ====
| # | Title | Release Date | Oricon Weekly Peak Position | Weeks on Chart |
|---|---|---|---|---|
| 1 | Electric Summer Track list: 1. Electric Summer; 2. Good Bye; 3. Sayonara-Nostalgia (Goodbye Nostalgia) (Last Summer version) | 2006-06-21 | #41 | 5 |
| 2 | Stand by Me Track list: 1. Stand by Me; 2. Tenkū Lonely Hearts (天空Lonely Hearts Lonely Hearts in the Ether); 3. Boy Meets Girl (Live) | 2006-10-04 | #26 | 4 |
| 3 | Dakishimetai (抱きしめたい, I Want to Hold You) Track list: 1. Dakishimetai (抱きしめたい I Want to Hold You); 2. Kareshi Kanojo no Kankei [Atarashii Kankei ver.] (彼氏彼女の関係[新しい関係 ver.] Boyfriend-Girlfriend Relationship [New Relationship ver.]) | 2007-04-04 | #26 | 6 |
| 4 | Dramatic (ドラマチック) Track list: 1. Dramatic (ドラマチック) - opening theme to the anime Ōkiku Furikabutte; 2. Tōmei Nijūrokuji (透明26時 2 A.M. Clarity); 3. Yūgata Generation [Atarashii Yūgata ver.] (夕方ジェネレーション [新しい夕方ver.] Evening Generation [New Evening ver.]) | 2007-05-16 | #13 | 16 |
| 5 | Manatsu no Jōken (真夏の条件, Midsummer Essential) Track list: 1. Manatsu no Jōken (真夏の条件 Midsummer Essential); 2. Gokusaishiki Imagination [Atarashii Imagination ver.] (極彩色イマジネイション [新しいイマジネイションver.] A Vivid Imagination [New Imagination ver.]) | 2007-07-18 | #26 | 3 |
| 6 | Aishiteru (愛してる, I Love You) Track list: 1. Aishiteru (愛してる I Love You); 2. Casual Love (カジュアル・ラヴ); 3. Aishiteru [Karaoke ver.]; 4. Aishiteru [Shiori Rockets ver.] (愛してる [史織ロケッツ ver.]) | 2007-10-31 | #22 | 3 |
| 7 | Changes Track list: 1. Changes - ending theme for Toshokan Sensō; 2. Summer Anthem; 3. Fiction Once More; 4. Dramatic to Eresama (ドラマチックとエレサマ Dramatic and Electric Summer) (Live from Countdown Japan 07/08 at Galaxy Stage) | 2008-05-08 | #10 | 9 |
| 8 | Love Mathematics Track list: 1. Love Mathematics; 2. School Girl Fantasy; 3. Wakamono no Yukue (String Graduation Version) (若者のゆくえ(弦楽グラデュエーションver.) The Direction of Youth) | 2009-01-07 | #5 | 4 |
| 9 | Kamigami Looks You (神々LOOKS YOU, Gods Are Looking At You) Track list: 1. Kamigami Looks You (神々LOOKS YOU Gods Are Looking At You) - theme of the movie Kamogawa Horumo; 2. Image Club; 3. Boys May Cry | 2009-04-15 | #10 | 5 |
| 10 | Breeeeze Girl Track list: 1. Breeeeze Girl; 2. Breeeeze Girl II; 3. Love Mathematics (Shibuya-kai "True Love" Remix) (LOVE MATHEMATICS (渋谷会"TRUE LOVE"REMIX)) | 2009-06-25 | #7 | 5 |
| 11 | Stairway Generation Track list: 1. Stairway Generation - theme of Gintama; 2. User Unknown; 3. Ren'ai Hakusho (恋愛白書 White Paper of Romance) | 2009-08-05 | #9 | 6 |
| 12 | Yoakemae (Before Dawn) Track list: 1. Yoakemae (Before Dawn); 2. Fragile Baby | 2011-06-29 | #17 | 3 |
| 13 | Short Hair Track list: 1. Short Hair; 2. Ido feat.Ryohu | 2011-08-31 | #17 | 3 |
| 14 | Tabibito In The Dark/Slow Motion wo Mou Ichido Part.2 (Tabibito In The Dark/スローモーションをもう一度 part.2, Traveller in the Dark/Slow Motion Again Part 2) Track list: 1. Tabibito In The Dark (Traveller in the Dark); 2. Slow Motion wo Mou Ichido Part.2 (スローモーションをもう一度 part.2 Slow Motion Again Part 2) | 2011-10-05 | #15 | 3 |
| 15 | Perfect Blue Track list: 1. Perfect Blue; 2. Ainoshitai (アイノシタイ); 3. Typical Girl | 2013-02-13 | #11 | 4 |
| 16 | Fanfare ga Kikoeru/Senkou_hanabi (ファンファーレがきこえる/senkou_hanabi, I Can Hear the Fanfare/Sparklers) Track list: 1. Fanfare ga Kikoeru (ファンファーレがきこえる I Can Hear the Fanfare); 2. Senkou_hanabi (Sparklers); 3. Fanfare ga Kikoeru (Karaoke Version); 4. Senkou_hanabi (Karaoke Version) | 2013-11-27 | #28 | 3 |
| 17 | "Sore tte, for Dare?" Part 1 (「それって、for 誰?」part.1, "Who is that for?" Part 1) Track list Disc 1: 1. "Sore tte, for Dare?" Part 1 (「それって、for 誰?」part.1 "Who is that for?" Part 1); 2. "Sore tte, for Dare?" Part 1 (Instrumental); 3. Album News Flash; Disc 2: 1. Live Audio of Hibiya Nonfiction IV 2015.6.13 | 2015-08-05 | #25 | 3 |
| 18 | Bunkasai no Yoru (文化祭の夜, Night of the Cultural Festival) Track list Disc 1: 1. Bunkasai no Yoru (文化祭の夜 Night of the Cultural Festival); 2. Bunkasai no Yoru (Instrumental); 3. Album News Flash; Disc 2: 1. 5th Album "Nijūkyusai" Instrumental Ver | 2015-09-02 | #33 | 3 |
| 19 | Fushigi na Yoru (不思議な夜, Strange Night) Track list Disc 1: 1. Fushigi na Yoru (不思議な夜 Strange Night); 2. Fushigi na Yoru (Instrumental); 3. Album News Flash; Disc 2: 1. Hard Disk de no Nagai Nemuri kara Ima Mezameta Rare Track Shū (ハードディスクでの永い眠りから今めざめたレアトラック集 Collection of Rare Tracks Now Awaken from a Long Sleep in the Hard Disk) Demo Track Compilation | 2015-10-07 | #21 | 3 |

==== Digital download releases ====
| # | Title | Release Date |
|---|---|---|
| 1 | Senkou_hanabi | 2013-07-24 |

==== Albums ====
| # | Title | Release Date | Oricon Weekly Peak Position | Weeks on Chart |
|---|---|---|---|---|
| 1 | C Track list: 1. Crazy for You no Kisetsu (CRAZY FOR YOUの季節 The Season I'm Crazy for You) (album version); 2. Girl Friend; 3. Matsuri no Ato (祭りのあと After the Festival); 4. Electric Summer; 5. Swimming Girl (スイミングガール); 6. You're My Sunshine no Subete (You're My Sunshineのすべて You're All of My Sunshine); 7. Girl of Arms; 8. Death to Love (DeathとLove Death and Love); 9. Stand by Me; 10. Last Dance (ラストダンス); 11. She is Back | 2006-11-29 | #28 | 8 |
| 2 | Jūnanasai (十七歳, Age 17) Track list: 1. Jūnanasai (17才 Age 17); 2. Dramatic (ドラマチック); 3. Dakishimetai (抱きしめたい I Want to Hold You); 4. Heaven's Door Girls (ヘヴンズドアー･ガールズ); 5. Aishiteru (愛してる I Love You); 6. Seventeen Romance; 7. Futatsu no Sekai (Two Worlds); 8. Manatsu no Jōken (真夏の条件 Midsummer Essential); 9. Aoi Haru.com (青い春.虚無 Youth, Nothingness); 10. Wink Sniper; 11. Kyōsōkyoku (協奏曲 Concerto); 12. Kidzuite Hoshii (気付いてほしい I Want You to Notice) | 2007-12-05 | #15 | 8 |
| 3 | (What Is The) Love & Pop? Track list: 1. Stairway Generation; 2. SOSOS; 3. Changes (album version); 4. Kamigami Looks You (神々LOOKS YOU Gods Are Looking At You); 5. Love Letter from Heart Beat; 6. White Twilight (ホワイトワイライト); 7. Breeeeze Girl; 8. Love Mathematics; 9. Simaitai; 10. Umi ni Naritai part.2 (海になりたい part.2 I Want To Be The Sea Part 2); 11. Lemon Squash Kankaku (レモンスカッシュ感覚 Lemon Squash Sensation); 12. Love & Pop (ラブ & ポップ); with hidden track Ashita wa Ashita no Ame ga Furu (明日は明日の雨が降る Tomorrow's Rain Will Fall Tomorrow) | 2009-09-02 | #9 | 7 |
| 3.5 | Cypress Girls Track list: 1. Jūjika You and I (十字架You and I The Cross of You and I); 2. Band Girl's Spiral Days; 3. Shine On You Cypress Girl; 4. Beautiful Wall (DUB); 5. Kamiawanai; 6. Kimino-me (+Ichiro Yamaguchi from Sakanaction); 7. Lemon Tāju (檸檬タージュ Lemon Montage); 8. Project Blue | 2010-09-29 | #10 | 3 |
| 3.5 | Detective Boys Track list: 1. Kuchibiru Detective (クチビル・ディテクティヴ Lips Detective) - collaboration with Acco from Chatmonchy and Ryohu; 2. Transfer Girl; 3. Boyfrien°C; 4. Lovesick; 5. White Room; 6. Hoshi ga Hoshii (星がほしい I Want the Stars); 7. Utatterunda Baby. (歌ってるんだBaby. Baby I'm Singing.) [1+1: new1 ver.]; 8. Tokyo (東京) | 2010-09-29 | #11 | 4 |
| 4 | Shinkokyū (新呼吸, New Breath) Track list: 1. Shinchō (深朝 Early Morning); 2. Dubbing Days (ダビングデイズ); 3. School Zone; 4. Tenkōsei (転校生 Transfer Student); 5. Slow Motion wo Mou Ichido (スローモーションをもう一度 Slow Motion Again); 6. Short Hair; 7. Tabibito In The Dark (Traveller in the Dark); 8. Hikarina (ヒカリナ); 9. Yozora Nibun no Ichi (夜空1/2 Night Sky 1/2); 10. Kodoku no Synthesizer; 11. Yoakemae (Hontou_no_yoakemae ver.) (Before Dawn (Real Before Dawn ver.)); 12. Shinkokyū (新呼吸 New Breath) | 2011-11-09 | #5 | 5 |
| 5 | Nijūkusai (二十九歳, Age 29) Track list: 1. Nansai (何才 How Old?); 2. Ambivalent Dancer (アンビバレントダンサー); 3. Fanfare ga Kikoeru (ファンファーレがきこえる I Can Hear the Fanfare) (Album Mix); 4. Ghost Town; 5. Yellow; 6. Sonna ni Suki Janakatta (そんなに好きじゃなかった I Didn't Like You That Much); 7. The Cut feat. Rhymester (Album Mix); 8. Hakobune (方舟 Ark); 9. The End; 10. Erai Hito (ERAい人 Remarkable Person); 11. Scramble (スクランブル); 12. Under the Star Light; 13. Perfect Blue (Album Mix); 14. Hikarigoke (光蘚 Luminous Moss) (Album Mix); 15. Maō (魔王 Devil King); 16. Canary (カナリア) | 2014-06-04 | #8 | 5 |
| 6 | C2 Track list Disc 1: 1. "Sore tte, for Dare?" Part 1 (「それって、for 誰?」part.1 "Who is that for?" Part 1); 2. Kobosanai de Shadow (こぼさないでShadow Don't Spill Over, Shadow); 3. Utsukushii no sa (美しいのさ It's Beautiful); 4. Aishiteru (曖してる Being Ambiguous); 5. Bunkasai no Yoru (文化祭の夜 Night of the Cultural Festival); 6. Rain Maker (レインメーカー); 7. Doushiyou (どうしよう What Should I Do); 8. Kashika (カシカ Visualisation); 9. Holy Lonely Mountain (ホーリーロンリーマウンテン); 10. Human; 11. Fushigi na Yoru (不思議な夜 Strange Night); 12. "Sore tte, for Dare?" Part 2 (「それって、for 誰?」part.2 "Who is that for?" Part 2); Disc 2: 1. Album "C2" (Instrumental Ver.); Disc 3: 1. 1st Album "C2" (2015 Remastered) | 2015-11-11 | #14 | 4 |
| 7 | C3 | 2020-01-22 | #16 | 1 |

==== Mini-albums ====
| # | Title | Release Date | Oricon Weekly Peak Position | Weeks on Chart |
|---|---|---|---|---|
| 1 | Girl Friend Track list: 1. Girl Friend; 2. Black Sea; 3. City Dance; 4. 4D Kaiwai (4D界隈 4D Neighbourhood) | 2006-04-12 | #113 | 2 |
| 2 | Hatsukoi (初恋, First Love) Track list: 1. Hatsukoi (初恋 First Love) - theme for the film Library War: The Wings of Revolution; 2. Bokura no Frai Awei (ぼくらのfrai awei Our Fly Away); 3. Kimi wa Nonfiction (君はノンフィクション You Are Nonfiction); 4. 60-Minute Live Track From "Tour Shinkokyū" (2012/5/20 @ Zepp Tokyo) | 2012-07-11 | #9 | 4 |
| 3 | The Cut Track list: 1. The Cut - collaboration with Rhymester; 2. Strange Dancer (ストレンジダンサー); 3. Koisuru Kankaku (恋する感覚 The Sensation of Falling in Love) - guest vocals from Kana Hanazawa; 4. 64-Minute Live Track From "Band B no Yukue Tour" (2013/4/25 Akasaka Blitz & 4/28 Sapporo Cube Garden) | 2013-06-26 | #18 | 4 |

==== Live albums ====
| # | Title | Release Date | Oricon Weekly Peak Position | Weeks on Chart |
|---|---|---|---|---|
| 1 | 1235 Track list Disc 1: 1. Gokusaishiki Imagination (極彩色イマジネイション); 2. Swimming Girl (スイミングガール); 3. Kareshi Kanojo no Kankei (彼氏彼女の関係); 4. School Girl Fantasy; 5. Dakishimetai (抱きしめたい); 6. Shōjo to Nue (少女と鵺); 7. Labyrinth e no Timing (ラビリンスへのタイミング); 8. White Twilight (ホワイトワイライト); 9. Jūnanasai (17才); 10. Aishiteru (愛してる); 11. Sayonara-Nostalgia; Disc 2: 1. Lemon Squash Kankaku (レモンスカッシュ感覚); 2. Breeeeze Girl; 3. Manatsu no Jōken (真夏の条件); 4. Umi ni Naritai (海になりたい); 5. Love Mathematics; 6. Changes; 7. Girl Friend (Encore); 8. Last Dance (ラストダンス) (Encore) | 2010-03-17 | #34 | 3 |

==== Best-of albums ====
| # | Title | Release Date | Oricon Weekly Peak Position | Weeks on Chart |
|---|---|---|---|---|
| 1 | Kanzenban "Band B ni Tsuite" (完全版「バンドBについて」, Complete Version "About Band B") Track list Disc 1: 1. Sayonara-Nostalgia (Goodbye Nostalgia); 2. Tsuyogari Shōjo (つよがり少女 Show-of-Force Girl); 3. Metamorphosis Massaichū (メタモルフォーぜ真っ最中 Right in the Middle of Metamorphosis); 4. Binetsu Boy (微熱ボーイ Low Fever Boy); 5. Sunset-KI･RE･I (Sunset: Beau-Ti-Ful); 6. Yūgata Generation (夕方ジェネレーション Evening Generation); 7. Shōjo to Nue (少女と鵺 A Girl and a Nue); 8. Yume Is Vision (Dream is Vision); 9. Kimi no Speed-kan (君のスピード感 Your Sense of Speed); 10. Tokyo Pyramid (東京ピラミッド); 11. Doppelgänger Graduation (ドッペルゲンガー・グラジュエーション); 12. Tragic Heroine; Disc 2: 1. Gokusaishiki Imagination (極彩色イマジネイション A Vivid Imagination); 2. April Mirage; 3. Kūhi Ganbō (空飛願望 Aspiring to Fly); 4. Himawari no Jūnigatsu (向日葵の12月 Sunflower's December); 5. Shirayuki no Kanojo (白雪の彼女 Snow White Girl); 6. Umi ni Naritai (海になりたい I Want to Become the Sea); 7. Aimai Memories (Unclear Memories); 8. Satellite Town ni te (サテライト・タウンにて In Satellite Town); 9. Kimi Iro no Machi (君色の街 A Town of Your Color); 10. Kage Nai Futari (翳ない2人 A Shadowless Couple); 11. Kareshi Kanojo no Kankei (彼氏彼女の関係 Boyfriend-Girlfriend Relationship); 12. High Color Times; 13. Labyrinth e no Timing (ラビリンスへのタイミング Timing to the Labyrinth) | 2009-01-07 | #10 | 4 |
| 2 | Band B no Best (バンドBのベスト, Best of Band B) Track list Disc 1: 1. Crazy for You no Kisetsu (CRAZY FOR YOUの季節 The Season I'm Crazy for You); 2. Girl Friend; 3. Electric Summer; 4. Stand by Me; 5. Matsuri no Ato (祭りのあと After the Festival); 6. Dakishimetai (抱きしめたい I Want to Hold You); 7. Dramatic (ドラマチック); 8. Manatsu no Jōken (真夏の条件 Midsummer Essential); 9. Aishiteru (愛してる I Love You); 10. Jūnanasai (17才 Age 17); 11. Changes; Disc 2: 1. Love Mathematics; 2. Kamigami Looks You (神々LOOKS YOU Gods Are Looking At You); 3. Breeeeze Girl; 4. Stairway Generation; 5. Kimino-me; 6. Kuchibiru Detective (クチビル・ディテクティヴ Lips Detective); 7. Yoakemae (Hontou_no_yoakemae ver.) (Before Dawn (Real Before Dawn ver.)); 8. Short Hair; 9. Tabibito In The Dark (Traveller in the Dark); 10. Hatsukoi (初恋 First Love); 11. Wakamono no Yukue (若者のゆくえ The Direction of Youth) (Original Version) | 2013-02-13 | #6 | 5 |

==== Various artist compilations ====
| Title | Release Date |
|---|---|
| Rock and Sympathy -Tribute to The Pillows-: 4. Funny Bunny (cover) | 2014-02-26 |

=== Video releases ===
==== Live DVDs ====
| Title | Release Date | Oricon Weekly Peak Position | Weeks on Chart |
|---|---|---|---|
| Live;(This Is The) Base Ball Bear. Nippon Budoukan 2010.01.03 Track list: 1. Dramatic (ドラマチック); 2. SOSOS; 3. Yume is Vision; 4. Changes; 5. Love Letter from Heart Beat; 6. Heaven's Door Girls (ヘヴンズドアー・ガールズ); 7. Tsuyogari Shōjo (つよがり少女); 8. 4D Kaiwai (4D界隈); 9. White Twilight (ホワイトワイライト); 10. Girl of Arms; 11. Wink Sniper; 12. Simaitai; 13. Sayonara-Nostalgia; 14. Breeeeze Girl; 15. Stairway Generation; 16. Umi ni Naritai Part.2 (海になりたいpart.2); 17. Crazy for You no Kisetsu (CRAZY FOR YOUの季節); 18. Love Mathematics; 19. Electric Summer; Encore: 1. Yūgata Generation (夕方ジェネレーション); 2. Boy Meets Girl; Double Encore: 1. Matsuri no Ato (祭りのあと) | 2010-03-17 | #19 | 3 |
| 10th Anniversary Tour (This Is The) Base Ball Bear part.2 "Live Shinkokyū" Track list: 1. Yūgata Generation (夕方ジェネレーション); 2. Stairway Generation; 3. Electric Summer; 4. Yoakemae; 5. Fragile Baby; 6. Short Hair; 7. Girl Friend; 8. Boyfrien°C; 9. Wink Sniper; 10. Tenkōsei (転校生); 11. Jūjika You and I (十字架You and I); 12. Swimming Girl~Umi ni Naritai~Umi ni Naritai Part.2 (スイミングガール～海になりたい～海になりたいpart.2); 13. Shinkokyū (新呼吸); 14. Changes; 15. Love Mathematics; 16. Crazy for You no Kisetsu (CRAZY FOR YOUの季節); Encore: 1. Kuchibiru Detective (クチビル・ディテクティヴ); 2. Tabibito In The Dark; 3. Matsuri no Ato (祭りのあと) | 2012-04-04 | #11 | 2 |
| Hibiya Nonfiction III (日比谷ノンフィクションIII) Track list: 1. Breeeeze Girl; 2. Perfect Blue; 3. Girl Friend; 4. Jūnanasai (17才); 5. Kareshi Kanojo no Kankei (彼氏彼女の関係); 6. Ainoshitai (アイノシタイ); 7. Aishiteru (愛してる); 8. Boys May Cry; 9. Short Hair; 10. Kimi wa Nonfiction (君はノンフィクション); 11. Simaitai; 12. Manatsu no Jōken (真夏の条件); 13. Yoakemae; 14. Tabibito In The Dark; 15. Umi ni Naritai Part.2 (海になりたいpart.2); 16. Love Mathematics; Encore: 1. High Color Times; 2. Matsuri no Ato (祭りのあと); Double Encore: 1. Changes; Bonus Disc 2 (Limited Edition only): 1. [2009-06-27 "Hibiya Nonfiction" @ Hibiya Open-Air Concert Hall] Image Club, Labyrinth e no Timing, Kidzuite Hoshii, Breeeze Girl, High Color Times; 2. [2010-06-19 "Hibiya Nonfiction Part.2" Day 1 @ Hibiya Open-Air Concert Hall] Lemon Squash Kankaku, Electric Summer; 3. [2010-06-19 "Hibiya Nonfiction Part.2" Day 2 @ Hibiya Open-Air Concert Hall] - School Girl Fantasy; 4. Base Ball Bear Members' Audio Commentary | 2013-11-27 | #15 | 2 |

==== Music video compilations ====
| Title | Release Date | Oricon Weekly Peak Position | Weeks on Chart |
|---|---|---|---|
| Eizōban "Band B ni Tsuite" Dai-Ikkan (映像版「バンドBについて」第一巻, Video Edition "About Band B" First Volume) | 2010-03-17 | #32 | 2 |
| Eizōban "Band B ni Tsuite" Dai-Nikan (映像版「バンドBについて」第二巻, Video Edition "About Band B" Second Volume) | 2011-11-09 | #9 | 2 |

==== Other releases ====
- Band B ni Tsuite (バンドBについて About Band B) (2006-01-12)
  - Special introducing album limited to 5000 copies.
  - This is the same as the indies release except for track eight "Girl of Arms", which was replaced by "Labyrinth e no Timing" as track two for this release.
- Yoakemae no Yoakemae (2011-04-07)
  - Limited edition single only sold at live venues on the band's "Base Ball Bear 10th Anniversary 'Sayonara-Nostalgia Tour'".
  - Contains live performance audio recordings of two songs, "Yoakemae" and "Changes".

=== Other collaborative works ===
==== Yusuke Koide only ====
- Shiho Nanba "Kodona no Kaidan" (こどなの階段, The Stairs of a Child to Adult) (2011-06-15)
  - Lyricist
- Shiho Nanba "Shōjo, Futatabi" (少女、ふたたび, Young Girl, Once Again) (2012-03-07)
  - Lyricist
- Becky "15 ~Spring Flag~" (2012-06-27)
  - Co-lyricist and composer
- Okamoto's "Aoi Tengoku" (青い天国, Blue Heaven) (2012-07-18)
  - Co-lyricist with Okamoto's
- Chocolat "Kaze" (風邪, A Cold)(2012-12-05)
  - Lyricist and composer
- Mai Endo "Today is the Day"(2013-07-31)
  - Co-lyricist with copywriter Hikaru Arashida, composer
- Tokyo Girls' Style "Partition Love" (2013-09-25)
  - Lyricist and composer
- Yasuyuki Okamura w Yusuke Koide "Ai wa Oshare Janai" (愛はおしゃれじゃない, Love Isn't Fashionable) (2014-04-02)
  - Vocalist and lyricist

==== As Base Ball Bear ====
- iLL "Utatterunda Baby" (歌ってるんだBaby, Baby I'm Singing) (2010-06-23)
  - Co-lyricist and co-composer with Koji Nakamura, vocals
- Hyadain "23:40 feat. Base Ball Bear" (23時40分 feat. Base Ball Bear) (2013-01-13)
  - Arrangement and guest vocals

== Media appearances ==
=== Film ===
- Linda Linda Linda (2005) - Sekine as Nozomi Shirakawa
- Library War: The Wings of Revolution (2012) - Koide as Rikudō Mark Ingram (voice acting)

=== Television ===
- Base Ball Bear no Base Ball Variety (Space Shower TV)
- Base Ball Bear no Base Ball Variety 2 (Space Shower TV)
- Base Ball Bear no Base Ball Variety 3 (Space Shower TV)
- Base Ball Bear no Base Ball Variety 4 (Space Shower TV)

=== Radio ===
- Base Ball Bear no All Night Nippon R (JOLF, 2 December 2006, 3 March 2007)
- Base Ball Bear no Soft Ball Dōkō-kai (JFN, 2009)
- School of Lock "Bebobe Locks!" (TFM, 2009–present)

== See also ==
- Chatmonchy
- Snowkel
- Sakanaction
- Okamoto's
- Yurina Kumai
- Tsubasa Honda
