= Battle Royale (film) =

2000 Japanese film by Kinji Fukasaku

- Theatrical release poster

Japanese name
- Kana: バトル・ロワイアル
Transcriptions
- Revised Hepburn: Batoru Rowaiaru
- Directed by: Kinji Fukasaku
- Screenplay by: Kenta Fukasaku
- Based on: Battle Royale by Koushun Takami
- Produced by: Masao Sato; Masumi Okada; Teruo Kamaya; Tetsu Kayama
- Starring: Tatsuya Fujiwara; Aki Maeda; Tarō Yamamoto; Chiaki Kuriyama; Kou Shibasaki; Masanobu Andō; Beat Takeshi
- Cinematography: Katsumi Yanagishima
- Edited by: Hirohide Abe
- Music by: Masamichi Amano
- Production company: Battle Royale Production Committee
- Distributed by: Toei Company
- Release dates: October 30, 2000 (Tokyo); December 16, 2000 (Japan)
- Running time: 113 minutes
- Country: Japan
- Language: Japanese
- Budget: $4.5 million
- Box office: $30.6 million

Battle Royale (Japanese: バトル・ロワイアル, Hepburn: Batoru Rowaiaru) is a 2000 Japanese dystopian action film directed by Kinji Fukasaku and written by Kenta Fukasaku, based on the 1999 novel of the same name by Koushun Takami. The film stars Tatsuya Fujiwara, Aki Maeda, Tarō Yamamoto, Chiaki Kuriyama, Kou Shibasaki, Masanobu Andō, and Beat Takeshi. Set in a dystopian Japan, it follows a class of junior high school students forced by the government to fight one another to the death as part of a compulsory survival program.

Battle Royale premiered at the Tokyo International Film Festival on October 30, 2000 before its theatrical release by Toei Company on December 16. Its depiction of violence involving schoolchildren provoked considerable controversy, particularly over its R15+ classification, and attracted criticism from Japanese politicians. The film subsequently faced restrictions on distribution in several countries, while concerns over potential controversy and litigation delayed its official release in the United States for more than a decade. Produced on a budget of $4.5 million, it grossed approximately $30.6 million worldwide.

The film was the last to be completed by Kinji Fukasaku, who died in January 2003 while working on its sequel, Battle Royale II: Requiem. The sequel was subsequently completed by his son Kenta and released later that year.

Battle Royale received generally positive reviews from critics and developed an international cult following, particularly through its home video releases. It has since been recognised as an influential work in the development and popularisation of the battle royale genre, in which a group of participants compete against one another until only one remains. Its premise has been widely adopted in subsequent films, literature and video games.

== Plot ==
Following a recession, an authoritarian Japanese government passes an act to curb juvenile delinquency by selecting a junior high school class at random to participate in a yearly 'game' called Battle Royale. Junior high schooler Shuya Nanahara struggles to process his father's suicide. His friend Yoshitoki Kuninobu stabs their teacher Kitano, who subsequently resigns. Shuya's classmate, Noriko Nakagawa, secretly keeps Kuninobu's knife.

One year later, Shuya's class fall asleep on a school bus, having been gassed, and awaken on a remote island. Kitano explains that they were chosen to participate in the annual Battle Royale; they have three days to fight to the death until a victor emerges. Explosive collars will kill uncooperative students or those within prohibited areas. Each student is provided rations, a map, supplies, and a random weapon. Kitano then kills two of the students, including Kuninobu. Twelve students die within the first six hours, four by suicide.

Mysterious, abused loner Mitsuko Souma and sadistic transfer student Kazuo Kiriyama become the most ruthless players. Shogo Kawada, another transfer student, spares Shuya after killing Kyoichi Motobuchi, while Shuya accidentally kills Tatsumichi Oki. Basketball player Shinji Mimura recruits Keita Iijima and Yutaka Seto to help him hack into the computer system to disrupt the program and convert a truck into a fire-bomb to destroy the perimeter.

Amid shifting loyalties and violent confrontations, Shuya promises to keep Noriko safe, as Kuninobu had feelings for her. They are eventually rescued by Kawada, who reveals that he won a previous Battle Royale at the cost of his girlfriend, who sacrificed herself when they were the final two remaining. He volunteered for the current Battle Royale game to avenge her by winning and killing those in charge. Kiriyama eventually attacks and wounds Shuya with his Uzi, but Shuya is saved by Sugimura.

Shuya awakens in the island's lighthouse, bandaged by Yukie Utsumi. Five other girls are hiding there, having made a pact to not participate in the game. Yuko Sakaki, having witnessed Shuya accidentally kill Oki, attempts to poison his food. However, another girl, Yuka, eats it, leading to a confrontation between the group, which results in a shootout. All but Yuko are killed; guilt-ridden, she jumps to her death. Shuya reunites with Noriko and Kawada, and the trio sets out to find Mimura. Later, Sugimura is killed by Kayoko Kotohiki, and he professes his love for her before he dies. Mitsuko kills her before she is killed by Kiriyama.

Mimura's group successfully infiltrate the computer system and prepare to destroy the school. Kiriyama arrives and kills them, but Mimura detonates the truck with explosives, injuring and blinding Kiriyama. When the trio arrives at the base, Kawada engages in a shootout with Kiriyama. Kiriyama's Uzi injures Kawada, while Kawada manages to detonate Kiriyama's collar.

On the final day, the trio awakens on the shore. Kawada, aware of the collars' internal microphones, feigns killing Shuya and Noriko. Believing Kawada has won, Kitano sends the soldiers off the island and brings him into the base. He realizes that Kawada hacked the system months beforehand and had disabled Shuya and Noriko's tracking devices. Shuya and Noriko enter the control room, and Kitano unveils a painting of the massacred class, depicting Noriko as the victor. He explains that he was unable to bear the hostility from his students, having been rejected by his own daughter, and that, because Noriko never disrespected him, he views her as a daughter. He asks her to kill him, but Shuya shoots him after he threatens them. After a final phone conversation with his daughter, Kitano succumbs to his wounds. The trio leaves the island on a boat, but Kawada dies from his injuries. Some time later, Noriko gives Shuya the knife that Kuninobu had used to injure Kitano. Shuya and Noriko are declared fugitives by the Japanese government, last seen on the run toward Shibuya Station.

== Cast ==
- Tatsuya Fujiwara as Shuya Nanahara
- Aki Maeda as Noriko Nakagawa
- Tarō Yamamoto as Shogo Kawada
- Chiaki Kuriyama as Takako Chigusa
- Kou Shibasaki as Mitsuko Souma
- Masanobu Andō as Kazuo Kiriyama
- Beat Takeshi as Kitano
- Takashi Tsukamoto as Shinji Mimura
- Sousuke Takaoka as Hiroki Sugimura
- Eri Ishikawa as Yukie Utsumi
- Hitomi Hyuga as Yuko Sakaki
- Yukihiro Kotani as Yoshitoki Kuninobu
- Sayaka Ikeda as Megumi Eto
- Takayo Mimura as Kayoko Kotohiki
- Sayaka Kamiya as Satomi Noda
- Yutaka Shimada as Yutaka Seto
- Minami as Keiko Onuki
- Yūko Miyamura as Training Video Girl

== Production ==
=== Casting ===
Roughly 6,000 actors auditioned for the film, which was narrowed down to 800 potential cast members. These finalists were subjected to a six-month period of physical fitness training under the supervision of the director, Kinji Fukasaku, who eventually cast 42 out of the 800.

Despite the characters being junior high school students, Aki Maeda, Yukihiro Kotani, Takayo Mimura, and Yukari Kanasawa were the only four who were aged 15 to 16 years old. The other members of the cast had all graduated from secondary education, and Tarō Yamamoto and Masanobu Andō were the oldest among the actors, aged 25.

The actor-director-comedian Takeshi Kitano (also known as Beat Takeshi) was cast in the role of the teacher. His casting served several purposes. As one of the most popular Japanese celebrities of the last few decades, both domestically and internationally, he helped draw a large audience to the film. He was also a game show presenter known for hosting popular Japanese game shows such as Takeshi's Castle (1986–1990), adding a sense of realism to the film's extreme game show concept.

=== Creative process ===
Kinji Fukasaku stated that he decided to direct the film because the novel it was adapted from reminded him of his time as a 15-year-old munitions factory worker during World War II. At that time, his class was made to work in a munitions factory. In July 1945, the factory came under artillery fire from US Navy warships. The children could not escape, so they dove under each other for cover. The surviving members of the class had to dispose of the corpses. At that point, Fukasaku realised that what he had been taught in school about World War II was a "pack of lies", and he developed a burning hatred of adults in general that he maintained for a long time afterwards.

Beat Takeshi told a documentary crew during filming that he believes "an actor's job is to satisfy the director ... I move the way I'm told to. I try to look the way I'm told to. I don't know much about the emotional side", before adding, "Mr. Fukasaku told me to play myself. I did not really understand, but he told me to play myself, as I ordinarily would! I'm just trying to do what he tells me."

When asked in an interview with The Midnight Eye, if the film is "a warning or advice to the young," Kinji Fukasaku responded by describing the words "warning" and "advice" as "sounding very strong to me" as if they were actions that one tries to accomplish; therefore, the film would not be "particularly a warning or advice." Fukasaku explained that the film, which he describes as "a fable," includes themes such as juvenile crime(s), which in Japan "are very much real modern issues." Fukasaku said that he did not have a lack of concern or a lack of interest; he used the themes as part of his fable. When the interviewer told Fukasaku that he asked the question specifically because of the word "run" in the concluding text, which the interviewer described as "very positive", Fukasaku explained that he developed the concept throughout the film. Fukasaku interpreted the interviewer's question as having "a stronger meaning" than "a simple message." He further explained that the film simply contains his "words to the next generation", so the viewer should decide whether to take the words as advice or as a warning.

=== Music ===
The film score for Battle Royale was composed, arranged, and conducted by Masamichi Amano, performed by the Warsaw Philharmonic Orchestra, and features several pieces of Western classical music along with Amano's original compositions. The choral movement used in the film's overture and original trailer is "Dies Irae" from Giuseppe Verdi's Requiem.

The song used during the end credits, "Shizuka na Hibi no Kaidan o" by the rap rock band Dragon Ash, is not included in either the Japanese or French edition of the soundtrack.

Battle Royale Original Soundtrack

Soundtrack album by Masamichi Amano and the Warsaw Philharmonic Orchestra
- Released: December 20, 2000
- Recorded: October 5–6, 2000
- Genres: Classical, soundtrack
- Length: 71 minutes
- Labels: Project-T; Cultural Publications

Track listing

Battle Royale Original Soundtrack
| No. | Title | Length |
|---|---|---|
| 1. | ""Requiem" (Verdi) ~ Dies irae" (「レクイエム」(ヴェルディ)~プロローグ) | 6:38 |
| 2. | "Millennium Education Reform Act (BR Act)" (新世紀教育改革法(BR法)) | 3:01 |
| 3. | "Teacher" (戦慄の教師) | 3:28 |
| 4. | "The Game Begins" (ゲーム開始) | 4:27 |
| 5. | "Memory" (施設の想い出) | 2:45 |
| 6. | "Kiriama e Mitsuko Theme" (殺戮者たち) | 3:32 |
| 7. | "Radetzky March (Strauss)" (ラデツキー行進曲(J.シュトラウス1世)) | 1:43 |
| 8. | "Ceux Qui Ont Pris Goût Au Jeu Et Ceux Qui Ont Abandonné" (ゲームに乗った者,そして降りた者) | 4:37 |
| 9. | "Blue Danube Waltz (Strauss)" (美しく青きドナウ(J.シュトラウス2世)) | 1:21 |
| 10. | "Escape" (七原と典子の逃避行) | 1:46 |
| 11. | "Nanahara and Noriko Friendship" (友情~盗聴) | 2:15 |
| 12. | "Auf dem Wasser zu singen" (水の上で歌う(シューベルト)) | 2:36 |
| 13. | "Kawada's Theme" (悲しみの勝利者) | 2:18 |
| 14. | "Kiriyama Attacks" (桐山の襲撃) | 4:30 |
| 15. | "Mimura's Determination" (三村の決意) | 1:13 |
| 16. | "Utsumi and Nanahara ~ Poison Medicine" (幸枝と七原~毒薬) | 5:29 |
| 17. | "The War of the Girls, without Faith nor Law" (少女たちの仁義無き戦い) | 4:28 |
| 18. | "Reunion" (再会) | 2:09 |
| 19. | "death Mitsuko Air from Orchestral Suite No. 3 in D Major (Bach)" (G線上のアリア(バッハ)) | 2:32 |
| 20. | "THE THIRD MAN" (THE THIRD MAN) | 3:33 |
| 21. | "Teacher and Students / Final Battle" (教師と生徒/ファイナル・バトル) | 1:56 |
| 22. | "Bitter Victory" (苦い勝利) | 2:17 |
| 23. | "A New Journey" (新たなる旅立ち) | 2:17 |

== Release ==
=== Premiere and theatrical release ===
The film was presented at the 13th Tokyo International Film Festival on October 30 2000, ahead of its commercial release.. Battle Royale was theatrically released in Japan by Toei Company on December 16, 2000, with an R15+ classification. The film's classification and depiction of violence involving schoolchildren attracted criticism from Japanese politicians before its opening. It was subsequently distributed internationally, although its American release was delayed by Toei's reluctance to license the film to a US distributor.

=== Festival screenings and international distribution ===
The film screened in the main program of the International Film Festival Rotterdam in 2001, where it was billed as its European premiere. The film also received a screening at the Pacific Film Archive in Berkeley, California, in January 2002.

The film was also shown at the Edinburgh International Film Festival in 2001 as part of its Late Night Romps programme. It appeared at the Sitges Film Festival that year. The film's German premiere took place at the Nippon Connection festival in Frankfurt on April 18, 2002.

The original 113-minute theatrical cut began its first commercial US theatrical run at the Cinefamily Theater in Los Angeles on December 24, 2011. The initially planned nine-day engagement was extended by six days. Further screenings took place at US universities and cinemas in 2012, including the IFC Center in New York City, where an engagement began on May 25. The film was also screened at the Projection Booth Theatre in Toronto.

For the film's 25th anniversary, Lionsgate Films partnered with Iconic Events for a US theatrical re-release on October 12–13 and 15, 2025.

=== Special edition ===
By February 2001, Fukasaku was preparing an extended version of the film; in an effort to reach younger viewers who had been excluded by the original film's age classification. Following the original film's commercial success, Fukasaku prepared a revised version, Battle Royale: Special Edition (バトル・ロワイアル 特別篇). The 122-minute cut combined footage omitted during the original editing process with newly filmed scenes and revised visual effects. The additional material developed the students' relationships and included an expanded basketball sequence. The revised version was released theatrically in Japan on April 7, 2001.

The Special Edition was released on DVD by Toei Video on May 21, 2002.

=== 3D theatrical re-release ===
The film was released to theaters in 3D in Japan on November 20, 2010. Fukasaku's son and the film's screenwriter, Kenta Fukasaku, oversaw the conversion. The 3D version was also screened at the Glasgow Film Festival on April 24, 2011. Anchor Bay Entertainment planned to release the 3D version in the United States sometime in 2011, but the release was cancelled.

== Home media ==
=== Limited edition release ===
Arrow Video released the film on Blu-ray and DVD in a limited-edition version in the United Kingdom on December 13, 2010, as a three-disc collector's edition set, featuring both cuts of the film. The DVD version was limited to 5,000 copies. The Blu-ray version was initially being released as limited to 5,000 copies, but due to the large volume of pre-orders, it was increased to 10,000 copies. The limited-edition Blu-ray is region-free, meaning it can play on Blu-ray players worldwide. The DVD is also region-free.

In April 2021, Arrow Video released a new limited edition Blu-ray and Ultra HD Blu-ray boxset featuring both cuts of the film in a new 4K restoration, as well as both cuts of the sequel on Blu-ray.

=== United States release ===
For a decade, Toei refused to sell the film to a United States distributor because they worried that the film would get involved in legal troubles in the United States. Eventually, Toei agreed to sell the film's United States rights to Anchor Bay Entertainment in 2010.

An official DVD and Blu-ray edition of the film and its sequel was released in North America on March 20, 2012, by Anchor Bay Films. The film is available in a standard edition featuring the two films and a 4-disc Complete Collection that features both the Special Edition (labelled the Director's Cut) and the theatrical version of the first film, the sequel, and a disc of behind-the-scenes material.

Both cuts of the film will be released on Ultra HD Blu-ray by Lionsgate Limited in the U.S. on December 9. 2025.

== Reception ==
=== Box office ===
During the first weekend, it grossed ¥212 million ($1.8 million). It went on to domestically gross ¥3.11 billion ($28.9 million), making it the third highest-grossing Japanese film of 2001, after the anime films Spirited Away and Pokémon 4Ever.

In the United Kingdom, the film sold 56,758 tickets (including 56,182 tickets in 2001 and 576 tickets from later limited re-releases by 2017), equivalent to a box office gross revenue of approximately £236,910 ($305,614).

In seven other European countries, the film sold 156,676 tickets (including 113,220 tickets in France and 43,456 tickets in six other European countries) between 2001 and 2017, equivalent to a box office gross revenue of approximately €877,386 ($991,446).

The film also grossed $339,954 in South Korea, Chile, and Argentina, in addition to $26,099 in Taiwan. This brings the film's estimated worldwide gross revenue to approximately $30,560,744 in these thirteen countries (equivalent to $52 million adjusted for inflation in 2018).

=== Critical reception ===
On the review aggregator website Rotten Tomatoes, 92% of 50 critics' reviews are positive, with an average rating of 7.7/10. The website's consensus reads: "Battle Royale is a controversial and violent parable of adolescence, heightening teenage melodrama with life-or-death stakes." Metacritic assigned the film a weighted average score of 81 out of 100 based on seven critics, indicating "universal acclaim". Robert Koehler of Variety commented, "Given the most basic characters to work with, the mostly teen cast attacks the material with frightening gusto, and Fujiwara dutifully invokes the voice of inner moral conflict. Production is exceedingly handsome and vigorous, offering no sign that Fukasaku is slowing down." He stated that, "returning to his roots as Japan's maestro of mayhem, Kinji Fukasaku has delivered" one of "his most outrageous and timely films", comparing it to "the outrage over youth violence" that Stanley Kubrick's A Clockwork Orange "generated in early-'70s Britain" and featuring some of "the most startling scenes of mayhem since the movies of the wild and bloody '70s." Jason Korsner of BBC News gave Battle Royale four out of five stars, stating that it is "a heart-stopping action film, teaching us the worthy lessons of discipline, teamwork, and determination, but wrapping them up in a deliberately provocative, shockingly violent package." BBC users gave the film five out of five stars. Almar Haflidason of BBC also gave the film five out of five stars. In a review for Empire, critic Kim Newman gave the film four stars out of five. He compared it to Lord of the Flies in how it makes audiences "wonder what they would do in the same situation", but wrote that Battle Royale gives "even harder choices for its school-uniformed characters." He concluded that "Some will be uncomfortable or appalled, and the mix of humour and horror is uneasy, but this isn't a film you'll forget easily. And, seriously, what would you do?"

The Guardian critic Peter Bradshaw gave the film four stars in September 2001, choosing it as the best film of the week. He praised Takeshi Kitano's performance as the teacher and some of the scenes as "a stunningly proficient piece of action film-making, plunging us into a world of delirium and fear." He notes that, among "the hail of bullets and the queasy gouts of blood, troubling narratives of yearning and sadness are played out. It is as if the violence of Battle Royale is not a satire of society at all but simply a metaphor for the anguish of adolescent existence." He concluded that, while some "will find the explicit violence of this movie repulsive", it "is a film put together with remarkable confidence and flair. Its steely candor and weird, passionate urgency make it compelling." Bryant Frazer of Deep Focus gave it a B+ rating and called it "a vicious take-off on reality TV that turns a high-school milieu dominated by cliques and childish relationships into a war zone." British critic Jonathan Ross stated that "if you want to catch a wildly original and super-cool slice of entertainment before it gets remade and ruined by the Americans, then I suggest you try hard not to miss it" and concluded that "it's a wildly imaginative example of just what can be achieved in a teen movie." In 2009, filmmaker Quentin Tarantino praised Battle Royale as one of his favorite films, stating that, "If there's any movie that's been made since I've been making movies that I wish I had made, it's that one."

There has been renewed interest in the film following its 2012 Blu-ray release in the United States. Chris Nashawaty of Entertainment Weekly rates the film an "A" grade, positing that the examination of the students' different motives for survival or subversion of the Program is a "sick blast". A.O. Scott of The New York Times gave the film a positive review, stating "[the] expertly choreographed scenes of mayhem are at once comical and appalling, and [Fukasaku's] young cast embraces the melodramatic extremity of the story with impressive conviction", adding that Battle Royale "is in many ways a better movie [than The Hunger Games] and in any case a fascinating companion, drawn from a parallel cultural universe. It is a lot uglier and also, perversely, a lot more fun." Entertainment critic Cary Darling describes Battle Royale as "tense, tragic and timely ... a modern-day horror story imbued with an electric sense of drama and dread." Alexandra Cavallo of the Boston Phoenix writes, "Battle Royale is The Hunger Games not diluted for young audiences," while giving the film three stars out of four. Jeffrey M. Anderson of Combustible Celluloid gave the film 4 out of 5 stars, calling it a "gloriously sick and twisted story" and claiming that it is "endlessly entertaining, by turns gory and hilarious, disturbing and exciting." In the Chicago Sun-Times, Roger Ebert's Australia correspondent Michael Mirasol praised Battle Royale for its "thoughtful characterisation" that is "lavished upon all the students" and concluded that it is an "intensely violent fable aimed at a young audience, but with true feeling, intelligence, and respect." Jake Mulligan of The Suffolk Voice gave it five out of five stars, stating that "the influence of "Royale" on works as disparate as "Kill Bill" and "The Hunger Games" cannot be measured" and describing Battle Royale as "Provocative, funny, violent, and aided by a script that somehow gives equal attention to most of the students while also displaying the well-thought-out minutia behind the narrative."

R.L. Shaffer of IGN gave the film a score of 8 out of 10, taking "a moment to thank The Hunger Games for reminding us how awesome Battle Royale really is" and concluding that Battle Royale is "a masterpiece of mayhem, violence and unfettered teen melodrama." J. Hurtado of Twitch Film noted that many "reviews of Battle Royale focus on the violence, which is extreme to be sure, and not so much on the humanity of the film." He stated that "cranking up that already elevated hormonal level of emotional hysteria by throwing these students into a real life-or-death situation is incredibly effective" and that "the story of Battle Royale is the story of those teenage years and just how wrong we all were about the extent of our emotional turmoil." DVD Talk gave the original theatrical cut of the film 4.5 out of 5 stars and 4 out of 5 stars for the Director's Cut, concluding that it gives "a glimpse into what might very well happen should the rules of society, such as they are, ever do crumble to the point where it's everyone for themselves. There's enough black humor here and enough tense action that the film never quite feels bleak or depressing (though it does come close), but most importantly, it makes you think." Devon Ashby of CraveOnline gave the film a score of 8.5 out of 10, referring to it as "Japanese legend Kinji Fukasaku's adolescent shooting spree opus" and "a compassionate and technically accomplished masterpiece." Brent McKnight of PopMatters gave the film a score of 9 out of 10, describing it as "savage, sharp, satirical, and brutally funny" and "a bleak commentary on humanity and society."

Film critics Robert Davis and Riccardo de los Rios praised the film's narrative structure. They commented that in adapting a story such as Battle Royale, which requires a suspension of disbelief to go along with its "far-fetched" story, Fukasaku instead turns conventional rules of screenwriting on its head. Instead of focusing on the detail of the premise of a near future where school kids kill one another, "the filmmakers dispense with premise in a short series of title cards". As the last film to be fully directed by Fukasaku, the Directory of World Cinema refers to Battle Royale as "perhaps the finest cinematic swansong ever conceived."

=== Social and political interpretations ===
An interpretation of the film is that it represents Japanese generational attitudes that are creating social, political and economic divides between the young and old. Fukasaku himself has stated: "The children who have grown up and witnessed what happened to the adults' anxiety became heightened as well. So I set Battle Royale within this context of children versus adults."

=== Accolades ===
At the 2001 Japanese Academy Awards, Battle Royale was nominated for nine awards, including Picture of the Year, and won three of them. The film was nominated for two awards from international film festivals but failed to win.

Awards
| Award | Category | Recipient(s) | Outcome |
|---|---|---|---|
Japanese Academy Awards
| Japanese Academy Awards | Picture of the Year | Battle Royale | Nominated |
| Japanese Academy Awards | Director of the Year | Kinji Fukasaku | Nominated |
| Japanese Academy Awards | Screenplay of the Year | Kenta Fukasaku | Nominated |
| Japanese Academy Awards | Actor of the Year | Tatsuya Fujiwara | Nominated |
| Japanese Academy Awards | Outstanding Achievement in Music | Masamichi Amano | Nominated |
| Japanese Academy Awards | Outstanding Achievement in Sound Recording | Kunio Ando | Nominated |
| Japanese Academy Awards | Outstanding Achievement in Film Editing | Hirohide Abe | Won |
| Japanese Academy Awards | Popularity Award | Battle Royale | Won |
| Japanese Academy Awards | Newcomer of the Year | Tatsuya Fujiwara and Aki Maeda | Won |
Blue Ribbon Awards
| Blue Ribbon Awards | Best Film | Kinji Fukasaku | Won |
| Blue Ribbon Awards | Best New Actor | Tatsuya Fujiwara | Won |
| Yokohama Film Festival | Best Supporting Actress | Kou Shibasaki | Won |
| San Sebastián Horror & Fantasy Film Festival | Audience Award for the Best Feature Film | Kinji Fukasaku | Won |
| Sitges Film Festival | Best Film | Kinji Fukasaku | Nominated |

== Controversies ==
Fukasaku originally opposed the R15+ rating given by the Eiga Rinri Kanri Iinkai (Eirin) because of Fukasaku's experiences as a teenager, the novel's use of 15-year-olds, and the fact that many of the actors were around fifteen years of age. After he submitted an appeal and before Eiga Rinri Kanri Iinkai could rule on the appeal, members of the National Diet said that the film harmed teenagers; the Diet members also criticised the film industry ratings, which were a part of self-regulation by the Japanese film industry. Fukasaku dropped the appeal to appease the Japanese Diet in hopes they would not pursue increasing film regulation further. Fukasaku criticized the ruling since the film was already blocked from people under 16 years of age.

The film was labeled "crude and tasteless" by members of the National Diet and other government officials after it was screened for them before its general release. Fukasaku stated that the Diet members had preconceived biases, making them unable to understand the points of the film. The film created a debate over government action on media violence. At one point, director Kinji Fukasaku gave a press statement directed at the age group of the film's characters, saying, "You can sneak in, and I encourage you to do so." Many conservative politicians used the film to blame popular culture for a youth crime wave. Ilya Garger of Time magazine said that Battle Royale received "free publicity" and received "box-office success usually reserved for cartoons and TV-drama spin-offs." Critic Tadao Sato remarked that the film would not have achieved the popularity it had without the political firestorm, stating, "Seeing the film is becoming a sort of resistance against politicians." The Japanese reaction to the film in the early 2000s has been compared to the British outrage over A Clockwork Orange in the early 1970s. Fukasaku stated that he felt discomfort with it, even though publicity increased due to the controversy.

Critics note the relation of Battle Royale to the increasingly extreme trend in Asian cinema and its similarity to reality television.

The creators of the sequel postponed the release of the DVD (originally scheduled for June 9, 2004) to later that year because of the Sasebo slashing, in which the killer had read Battle Royale.

For eleven years, the film was never officially released in the United States or Canada, except for screenings at various film festivals. The film was screened to a test audience in the U.S. during the early 2000s, not long after the Columbine High School massacre, resulting in a negative reaction to the film's content. According to the book Japanese Horror Cinema, "Conscious of the Columbine syndrome, which also influenced the reception of The Matrix (1999), much of the test audience for Battle Royale condemned the film for its 'mindless' and gratuitous violence in terms very reminiscent of the British attitude towards Sam Peckinpah's Straw Dogs (1971) on its initial release."

No North American distribution agreement for the film had ever been reached due to myriad corporate and legal concerns on the parts of both the Japanese Toei Company, Ltd. and prospective North American studios, despite mutual interest. It was said in 2005 by a representative of a prospective U.S. distributor that Japanese executives from the Toei Company were advised by American lawyers who attended test screenings in the early 2000s that "they'd go to jail" had the film been mass-released in the United States at the time. In the company's best interests, Toei attached prohibitive rules, costs, and legal criteria to any possible North American distribution deal. Toei representative Hideyuki Baba stated that the reason for "withholding distribution" in North America was "due to the picture's contents and theme." A representative for a prospective US distributor criticised Toei for expecting a wide release rather than a limited art house run, noting that "in the US it will never get past the MPAA ratings board, and the major theater chains will never play it un-rated. If you cut it enough to get an R rating, there'd be nothing left."

In April 2013, the film was banned in Germany, but subsequently the ban was lifted following an objection by the German distributor Capelight Pictures.

== Legacy ==
In 2009, Quentin Tarantino listed Battle Royale as one of his favorite films since he began directing in 1992. That same year, Moviefone included it in the top three of its "50 Best Movies of the Decade" list. Jon Condit of Dread Central called it "one of the best movies [he's] ever seen." Bloody Disgusting ranked the film fifteenth in its list of the "Top-20 Horror Film of the Decade", with the article calling the film "a go-for-break extravaganza: fun, provocative, ultra-violent, and bound to arouse controversy (which it did) ... the film [is] more than just an empty provocation; it builds character through action, a method all good filmmakers should seek to emulate." In 2010, Empire ranked Battle Royale #235 and #82 on their lists of "The 500 Greatest Movies of All Time" and "The 100 Best Films of World Cinema," respectively. Time magazine included the film in its list of Top 10 Ridiculously Violent Movies. In 2012, The Independent included it in its "10 best sports movies ever made" list. Complex magazine ranked it #47 in its list of The 50 Best Action Movies of All Time.

=== Sequel ===
Kinji Fukasaku, who directed the first film, began work on a sequel, entitled Requiem, but died of prostate cancer on January 12, 2003, after shooting only one scene with Takeshi Kitano. His son, Kenta Fukasaku, directed the rest of the film, which was released on May 18, 2003.

Unlike the first film, the sequel is not adapted from a novel but was based on an original screenplay written by Kenta Fukasaku. The plot revolves around the survivor Shuya Nanahara leading a terrorist rebellion, but was controversial for its provocative anti-American sentiments and criticised for being inferior to the original.

=== Remake plans ===
In June 2006, Variety reported that New Line Cinema, with producers Neal H. Moritz and Roy Lee, intended to produce a new adaptation of Battle Royale. Several Web sites echoed the news, including Ain't It Cool News, which claimed the remake would be "an extremely Hard R—serious-minded Americanisation of Battle Royale." New Line tentatively set a release date of 2008.

The next month, The New York Times reported on an Internet backlash against the remake. Through the article, Lee assured fans of his respect for the original work, claiming, "This is the one I'm going to be the most careful with." He stated that, despite earlier concerns, the film would not be toned down to PG or PG-13, the characters would remain young teenagers, and that it would draw elements equally from the novel, the original film, and the manga. The reporter noted that "the hubbub ... was at least slightly premature [as] New Line hasn't yet purchased the remake rights."

Following the Virginia Tech massacre in April 2007, Lee claimed that prospects for the remake had been "seriously shaken." While he remained willing to proceed, he stated, "we might be a little more sensitive to some of the issues." The reporting article noted that New Line still had not secured remake rights; its spokeswoman claimed "no news" when asked about progress on any deal.

Maclean's, Movie City News, and The Wall Street Journal have pointed out that the 2008 novel The Hunger Games and its subsequent 2012 film adaptation have similar themes, with some criticizing it as a "rip-off." Hunger Games author Suzanne Collins maintains that she "had never heard of that book until [her] book was turned in" and that she was advised by her editor not to read it so as not to get "that world in [her] head." The New York Times also reports that "the parallels are striking enough that Collins's work has been savaged on the blogosphere as a baldfaced ripoff," but goes on to state that "The authors share an interest in the mechanisms of state control, but their agendas clearly diverge" and "there are enough possible sources for the plot line that the two authors might well have hit on the same basic setup independently."

In March 2012, Roy Lee reported that a remake of Battle Royale would no longer be possible due to the release of The Hunger Games, stating, "Audiences would see it as just a copy of Games—most of them wouldn't know that 'Battle Royale' came first. It's unfair, but that's reality." However, he stated that he might return to the film in ten years to "develop a "Battle Royale movie for the next generation."

=== Television adaptation ===
During the summer of 2012, The CW had been in discussion with Hollywood representatives about the possibility of adapting Battle Royale into a television series. According to a spokesperson, the talks were only preliminary, but if a deal could be reached, the network would acquire rights to Koushun Takami's underlying novel, then unpack and expand on it for an hour-long dramatic series. Joyce Jun, a Hollywood attorney representing U.S. rights to the title, stated that "there is no deal in place". A CW spokesman confirmed only there had been some discussion but declined to comment further.

== Cultural impact ==
The film, especially with its DVD releases, drew a large global cult following and became a cultural phenomenon. Quentin Tarantino considers Battle Royale to be one of the most influential films in recent decades. The film has been highly influential in global popular culture, inspiring numerous works of battle royale genre fiction in a number of different media across the world.

=== Film and television ===
Since its release, the film has had an influence on filmmakers such as Quentin Tarantino, most notably his Kill Bill films; the character Gogo Yubari, played by Chiaki Kuriyama, resembles the character she plays in Battle Royale, Takako Chigusa. Battle Royale has also been referenced in the 2004 zombie comedy film Shaun of the Dead, where Edgar Wright and Simon Pegg made sure a big Battle Royale poster is prominently displayed in Shaun's living room. Despite not being officially released in the United States for a long time, Battle Royale has often been referenced in American pop culture, ranging from Tarantino's films to the rock band The Flaming Lips' use of footage from the film as a backdrop for its Yoshimi Battles the Pink Robots tour, along with references in Hollywood films such as Jason Reitman's Thank You for Smoking (2005) and Juno (2007) and American television shows such as Lost and Community. In Wrong Turn 2: Dead End, one of the characters (Matthew Currie Holmes as Michael "M" Epstein) wears a Battle Royale shirt.

Maggie Lee of Reuters describes Battle Royale as the "film that pioneered the concept of the teen death game", citing its influence on films such as Kaiji (2009) and Hideo Nakata's The Incite Mill (2010), both of which starred Tatsuya Fujiwara (who played Battle Royale's protagonist Shuya Nanahara) in the leading roles. V.A. Musetto of the New York Post compared it to The Condemned (2007), which the critic called "a bad rip-off" of Battle Royale as well as The Most Dangerous Game.

Critics have also noted the influence of Battle Royale on other films, such as the 2008 film Kill Theory, the 2009 film The Tournament, and The Hunger Games trilogy. Battle Royale has also drawn comparisons to films such as Gamer (2009), Kick-Ass (2010), and The Belko Experiment (2016). Other examples of "battle royale" films include The Purge series (2013), Assassination Nation (2018), Ready or Not (2019), and The Hunt (2020). The South Korean Netflix original series Squid Game (2021) was also influenced by Battle Royale.

=== Comics, manga and anime ===
Battle Royale has drawn comparisons to the Gantz franchise of manga (2000), anime (2004) and films (2011). Btooom! (2009 debut) features a variation of the battle royale theme.

The film has also influenced the creation of the Marvel Comics series Avengers Arena. The series' logo also mirrors that of the logo used in the Battle Royale movie.

=== Video games and visual novels ===
The genre of battle royale video games, in which players compete to be the last one standing in a shrinking battlefield, was inspired by and took its name from the film. The genre became popular in the late 2010s and includes games such as PlayerUnknown's Battlegrounds, Fortnite Battle Royale, ARMA 3, H1Z1: King of the Kill, Knives Out, Rules of Survival, Garena Free Fire, Apex Legends, Realm Royale, Call of Duty: Black Ops 4's "Blackout" game mode, and Call of Duty: Warzone.

The film's title also refers to the battle royale genre of visual novels, revolving around a similar narrative premise. Examples include the Fate/stay night series (2004 debut), Dies irae (2007), and the Zero Escape series (2009 debut). The Danganronpa series (2010 debut) is also notably influenced by the film, with its scenario writer Kazutaka Kodaka citing the film as an influence. Battle Royale has also drawn comparisons to Square Enix's The World Ends with You (2007).

== See also ==
- Cinema of Japan
- List of cult films
