= Keiko Inoue =

Keiko Inoue may refer to:

- Keiko Toda, actress
- Keiko Onuki, Battle Royale character
