= Battle royal =

Fight involving three or more combatants

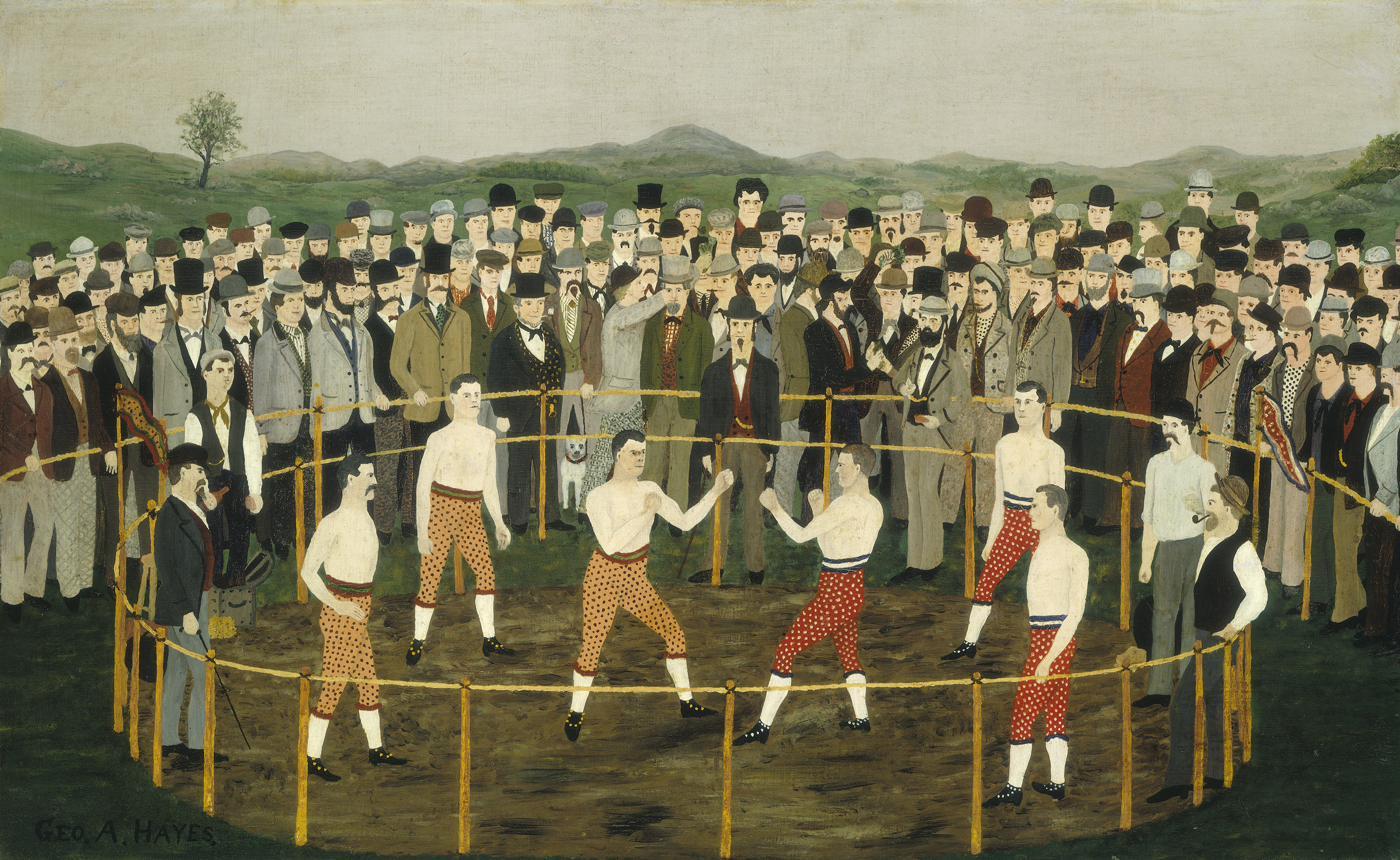
Bare Knuckles, 19th century oil painting by George A. Hayes

A battle royal (pl. battles royal or battle royals, also battle royale) traditionally refers to a fight involving many combatants, usually conducted under either boxing or wrestling rules, where the winner is the one who registers the most wins. In recent times, the term has been used more generally to refer to any fight involving large numbers of people who are not organized into factions. Within combat sports and professional wrestling, the term has a more specific meaning.

Outside sports, the term battle royale has taken on a new meaning in the 21st century, from Koushun Takami's 1999 Japanese dystopian novel Battle Royale and its 2000 film adaptation of the same name, referring to a fictional narrative genre and/or mode of entertainment also known as death games and killing games, where a select group of people is instructed to hunt and kill one another in a large arena until there is only one survivor.

== Sports ==
=== Historical uses ===
In 18th century England, bare-knuckle boxing conducted according to Jack Broughton's rules included matches involving eight fighters. Referred to as "Broughton's Battle Royals", these events were spoofed in political cartoons of the era. The practice eventually fell out of favor in the United Kingdom, but it continued in the American colonies. Lower-class white people who lived in the backcountry practiced "free-for-all" as well as rough-and-tumble fighting. The practice also spread to enslaved people in America via their abductors and enslavers, who forced the enslaved into mass fights as a form of entertainment. In a similar vein, Frederick Douglass wrote that practices such as allowing slaves to hunt animals for sport on holidays, as well as consume alcohol and participate in other leisurely activities, were "among the most effective in the hands of the slaveholder in keeping down the spirit of insurrection."

After the American Civil War, the battle royal became even more popular, but the events were also increasingly considered shameful and disreputable. Promoters of boxing events arranged for brutal free-for-alls with few rules, generally between black boxers. The audience for these spectacles was almost always white, unlike the pre-war entertainment within the enslaved communities. A battle royal was a frequent opening event for boxing and wrestling shows from 1870 to 1910. They originated and were most popular in the Southern United States but eventually spread to the North. However, the events fell out of favor, especially in the North. In New York, the State Athletic Commission banned battles royal in 1911. They continued in the South from the 1910s to the 1950s but with less popularity. The 1952 novel Invisible Man by Ralph Ellison contains a depiction of a battle royal. By the 1960s, battles royal had been banned in the South.

The battle royal was a way for an aspiring boxer to get noticed, and successful battle royal champions gained enough prestige to participate in more respectable boxing matches. Jack Johnson, Joe Gans, and Beau Jack are three successful boxers who started out in battles royal.

=== Professional wrestling ===
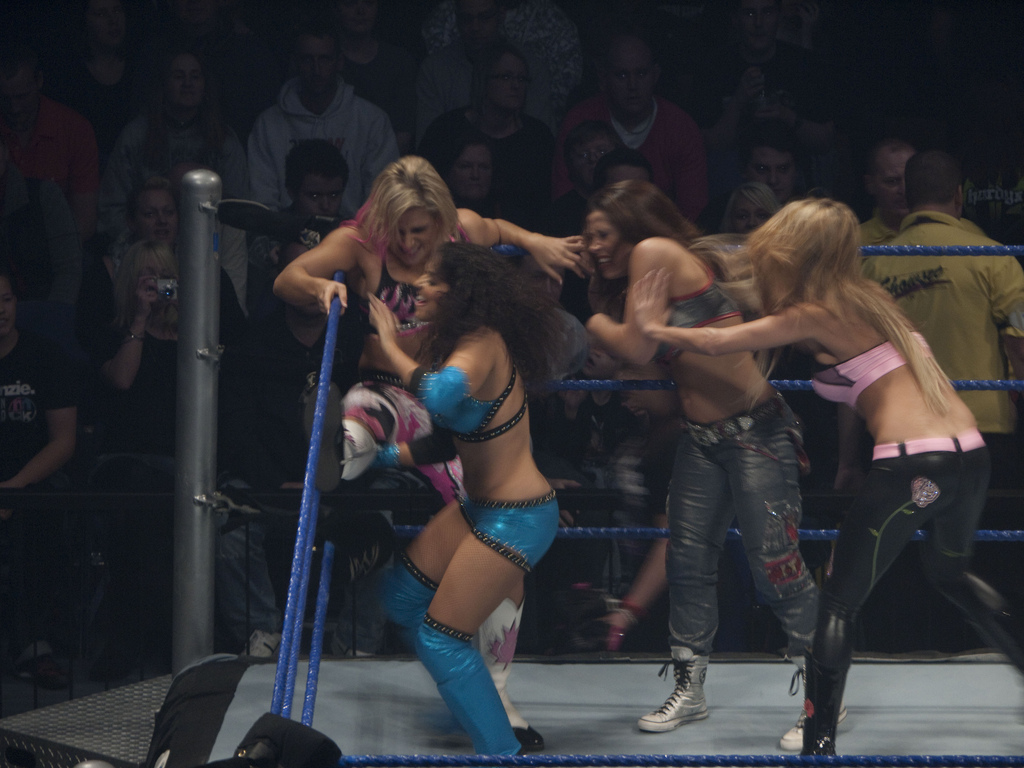
WWE wrestlers competing in a battle royal in 2009

In professional wrestling, the battle royal is a match involving anywhere between four and sixty wrestlers that takes place entirely inside the ring—a wrestler is eliminated when someone scores a pin against them or knocks them out, but there are rarely submissions. Some promotions allow over-the-top rope eliminations or enforce them exclusively, notably battles royal in the WWE, including in their annual Royal Rumble. Battle royals are often used to determine the top contender for a championship or to fill vacant championships.

World Championship Wrestling was known for having the largest battle royal in wrestling, held annually at their WCW World War 3 pay-per-view events. The three-ring, sixty-wrestler events consisted of all sixty wrestlers parading to the ring (usually without formal introductions to save time) and beginning to fight at the bell. Once the number of wrestlers in each ring was down to a number suitable for a single ring, the wrestlers would all move to the designated "Ring #1" out of the three and fight until there was a winner. The winners of the four World War 3 battles royal were Randy Savage, The Giant, Scott Hall, and Kevin Nash.

World Championship Wrestling also held an event called Battlebowl in which 20 men started in one ring and would have to throw the others into a second ring. From that ring, they would be thrown to the floor for elimination. The last man in ring one would rest until one was left in ring two. Those two men would battle until one man was left and declared the winner. In 1991, Sting won the match after it came down to him and Lex Luger. Every year thereafter, Battle Bowl took place with only one ring and a normal battle royal. The entrants were decided through tag-team matches consisting of randomly selected partners, where the winning team would advance to the BattleBowl, called a "Lethal Lottery" by WCW, due to the potentiality of rivals being forced to work as a team.

Numerous variations of the battle royale also exist, including:

- World Wrestling Entertainment's Royal Rumble: an over-the-top-rope elimination match that starts with two competitors and adds a new competitor every two minutes, usually up to a total of thirty entrants, with the final remaining competitor being the winner.
- Total Nonstop Action Wrestling's Gauntlet for the Gold: an over-the-top-rope elimination match in which the final two competitors face off in a singles match.
- Tag Team Battle Royal: a standard battle royal in which teams of two, three, or four combatants compete for group victory. Variations have been used in both WCW and TNA.
- All Elite Wrestling's Royal Rampage: an over-the-top-rope elimination match that involves two rings and, as of 2022, twenty competitors. It was loosely based on WCW's World War 3 matches.

== Battle royale genre ==
In the 21st century, the 2000 Japanese film Battle Royale, itself based on the 1999 novel of the same name, redefined the term "battle royale" in popular culture. The term "battle royale" has since been used to refer to a fictional narrative genre where a select group of people is instructed to kill one another until there is one survivor. The "battle royale" phenomenon became especially popular in the 2010s. Battle Royale set out the basic rules of the genre, including players being forced to kill each other until there is a single survivor and the need to scavenge for weapons and items. The "battle royale" concept first gained mainstream popularity in Japan, where Battle Royale inspired a wave of manga, anime, and visual novel works during the 2000s, before the concept gained global mainstream popularity in the 2010s.

There are a number of popular battle royale video games, films, manga, anime, and visual novels. Along with the Battle Royale franchise itself, other examples of battle royale films include The Big Brawl (1980), Mean Guns (1997), The Hunger Games franchise (2008), The Purge (2013), Assassination Nation (2018), and The Hunt (2020). Battle Royale inspired television series include the Japanese TV series Alice in Borderland (2020) as well as the South Korean show Squid Game (2021). Popular examples of battle royale games include PlayerUnknown's Battlegrounds (2017), Fortnite Battle Royale (2017), Rules of Survival (2017), Garena Free Fire (2017), Call of Duty: Black Ops 4 (2018), Apex Legends (2019), Call of Duty: Warzone (2020), and Fall Guys: Ultimate Knockout (2020).

Along with the Battle Royale manga (2000 debut), other examples of battle royale manga, anime, and tokusatsu, include Gantz (2000 debut), Kamen Rider Ryuki (2002 debut), Basilisk (2003 debut), Bokurano (2003 debut), the Fate/stay night franchise (2005 debut), Future Diary (2006 debut), Deadman Wonderland (2007 debut), Btooom! (2009 debut), the Danganronpa franchise (2010 debut), Magical Girl Raising Project (2012 debut), Darwin's Game (2012 debut), Kamen Rider Geats (2022 debut), and No.1 Sentai Gozyuger (2025 debut).

Examples of battle royale visual novel games include the Fate/stay night series (2004 debut), Dies irae (2007), the Zero Escape series (2009 debut), and the Danganronpa series (2010 debut). In-universe battle royale video games were depicted in Btooom!, and in the Phantom Bullet (Gun Gale Online) arc of the light novel series Sword Art Online (2010 in print) as the "Bullet of Bullets" tournament.

== See also ==
- Gladiators
- King of the Hill (game)
- Melee
