= Battle Royale (novel) =

1999 novel by Koushun Takami

- First edition cover, as published by Ohta Publishing
- Author: Koushun Takami
- Translator: Yuji Oniki (2003 edition); Nathan Collins (2014 edition)
- Language: Japanese
- Genre: Dystopian; Horror
- Publisher: Ohta Publishing
- Publication date: April 1999
- Publication place: Japan
- English publication date: February 26, 2003 by Viz Media
- Media type: Print (Paperback)
- Pages: 666
- ISBN: 4-87233-452-3

Battle Royale (Japanese: バトル・ロワイアル, Hepburn: Batoru Rowaiaru) is a Japanese dystopian horror novel by journalist Koushun Takami. Battle Royale is the first and only novel from Takami and was originally completed in 1996 but was not published until 1999. The book tells the story of junior high school students who are forced to fight each other to the death in a program run by a fictional fascist, totalitarian Japanese government known as the Republic of Greater East Asia.

The dystopian novel was previously entered into the 1997 Japan Horror Fiction Awards but was eventually rejected in the final round due to concerns over its depictions of students killing each other. Upon publication in 1999, the novel became a surprise bestseller.

In 2000, one year after publication, Battle Royale was adapted into a manga series, written by Takami himself, and a feature film. The film was both controversial and successful, becoming one of the year's highest-grossing films as well as prompting condemnation by Japan's National Diet. The film spawned a sequel, and two more brief manga adaptations were also created.

== Plot ==
Map of Okishima Island, seen inside the cover of the 2003 English translation

Battle Royale takes place in a fictional fascist Japan in the year 1997. The state, known as the Republic of Greater East Asia (大東亜共和国, Dai Tōa Kyōwakoku), arose after an alternate World War II where Japan emerged victorious, and a rebellion was put down by the combined military and police forces. The government controls everything, alongside an unnamed dictator with a strong cult of personality, able to bend the whims of the populace. Anything "immoral" – such as rock music – is banned unless it beautifies the government.

The government has established a military program, the Battle Experiment No. 68 Program (戦闘実験第六十八番プログラム, Sentō Jikken Dai Rokujū Hachi Ban Puroguramu), wherein fifty randomly selected classes of third-year junior high school students are kidnapped, dropped into a remote location, and forced to kill one another until only one student of each class remains. Ostensibly, it is to help the government and its military research survival skills and battle readiness – in actuality, it is meant to instill terror and distrust in all of Japan's citizens to curb any attempts at rebellion by showcasing the government's power and ability to target citizens' families and preying on the fear of being killed by a friend.

A group of students from Shiroiwa Junior High School (城岩中学校, Shiroiwa Chūgakkō), a school in the fictional Kagawa Prefecture town of Shiroiwa, prepare for a field trip. Among them are wannabe rock star Shuya Nanahara, whose father was killed by the regime; Noriko Nakagawa, the demure crush of Shuya's best friend; Shogo Kawada, a quiet, tough young transfer student; and sociopathic prodigy Kazuo Kiriyama and the beautiful yet unhinged Mitsuko Souma. En route, they are gassed unconscious – the "field trip" was a ruse for the Program.

They awake in a classroom on a small, vacated island, surrounded by troops, and wearing metal collars around their necks. A teacher, psychopathic sadist Kinpatsu Sakamochi, briefs the students: the class has been chosen to participate in the Program. The students are also given a time limit. If twenty-four hours pass without someone being killed, then all of the collars will be detonated simultaneously, and there will be no winner. It is mentioned that only 0.5% of Programs end in this fashion. The students are issued survival packs and a random weapon/tool and sent out onto the island individually. While most students receive guns and knives, some acquire relatively useless items like boomerangs, dartboard darts, or a fork. Hiroki Sugimura finds a radar device that tracks nearby students, and Toshinori Oda receives a bulletproof vest.

To make sure the students obey the rules and kill each other, the metal collars around their necks track their positions. They will explode if they attempt to remove the collars or linger in "Forbidden Zones": randomly chosen areas of the map that increase in number over time, re-sculpting and shrinking the battlefield and forcing the students to move around. The collars secretly transmit sound back to the game organizers, allowing them to hear the students' conversations, root out escape plans, and log their activities.

The students desperately fight amongst each other for survival, with mentally ill bullies Mitsuko and Kiriyama killing many. Shuya takes Noriko under his wing after his best friend is killed, believing that he has a duty to honor his fallen friend by protecting his crush. Shogo – who is revealed to be the winner of a previous Battle Royale and hopes to put an end to the Program – avoids the fighting, joining with Shuya. Shuya's friend, athlete Shinji Mimura, attempts to hack the system running the Program and bomb the building where Sakamochi and the other personnel overseeing the Program are stationed, but is killed by Kiriyama.

Eventually, halfway through the third day, only Shogo, Shuya, Noriko and Kiriyama remain, with Kiriyama set on hunting down the trio. After a frantic car chase, Kiriyama is finally gunned down. Shuya and Noriko are held at gunpoint by Shogo, who criticizes them over being so naive as to trust anyone in the Program; the collars record gunshots and Shuya and Noriko flatlining.

Declared the winner by Sakamochi, Shogo is escorted to his transport off the island, surrounded by soldiers. Sakamochi, however, reveals that he knows Shuya and Noriko are alive and that his supposed execution of Noriko and Shuya was a ruse after he found a way to disable their collars and attempts to kill Shogo. Shogo kills him as a hidden Shuya and Noriko hijack the boat and kill the soldiers on board. As the boat sails towards the mainland, Shogo succumbs to his wounds sustained during the fight with Kiriyama and dies, but not before thanking Shuya and Noriko for being his friends.

On the advice of Shogo, Shuya and Noriko escape to the mainland and plan to flee to a democratic America, pursued by the government.

== Characters ==
- Shuya Nanahara – An orphan whose parents were killed for taking part in anti-government activities. Shuya is a self-proclaimed "rock star," listening to and playing rock 'n' roll music in spite of the ban on the genre. After the death of his best friend Yoshitoki Kuninobu, he vows to protect Kuninobu's crush, Noriko Nakagawa, in his stead.
- Noriko Nakagawa – A quiet, reserved girl who teams up with Nanahara from the beginning and becomes a sort of love interest. She is shot in the leg by a soldier before the Program starts.
- Shogo Kawada – A transfer student from Kobe that is one year older than the rest of the class and covered in scars. He is a loner and, unbeknownst to his classmates, won the Program the previous year. He teams up with Nanahara and Nakagawa with a plan to escape the island together.
- Kazuo Kiriyama – The leader of delinquents, who is also the smartest and one of the most athletic students in the class. He's emotionless due to damage suffered in an accident while in utero, leading to a partial lobotomy. He actively takes part in the Program, killing his fellow students remorselessly.
- Mitsuko Souma – The beautiful leader of a female gang. Having been sexually abused several times as a child, Souma actively takes part in the Program, using her sexuality to kill her male classmates.
- Kinpatsu Sakamochi – The government official in charge of supervising this year's Program. He is stocky, with long hair reaching his shoulders, and ruthless.

== Background ==
=== Origin ===
In the 1990s, Koushun Takami came up with the original story concept for Battle Royale after having a dream. Takami stated in 2009:

I was lying in my futon, half asleep, half awake, and I got the mental image of a teacher from a school drama I saw on TV long ago. He said, “All right class, listen up.” [...] “Now today, I’m going to have you kill each other!” The image of him grinning as he spoke was so vivid, I laughed, but was also terrified. [...] And with just that, I knew I had something to write about.

— Koushun Takami (2009)

He came up with the title Battle Royale after discussing his story concept with his friends, who said it sounded like a reimagined pro-wrestling battle royal match. Takami then took an interest in the social aspect of a battle royal match, such as how former enemies work together in order to defeat a stronger foe and particularly how former allies betray each other for their own glory. For the worldbuilding, he was inspired by his upbringing in 1960s Japan, when large groups of revolutionaries fought back against police brutality. His depiction of a totalitarian fascist government was also influenced by his favourite Stephen King novel, The Long Walk (1979), which is about a walking contest organized by a totalitarian government.

=== Publication ===
Cover of the first English-language edition

Takami completed Battle Royale when he stopped working as a journalist in 1996. The story was rejected in the final round of the 1997 Japan Horror Fiction Awards (ja:日本ホラー小説大賞), which took place in March 1998, because of its controversial content. Masao Higashi, who took part in the award's preliminary selection committee, later suspected this was due to its backdrop of students killing each other being too reminiscent of the Kobe child murders committed the previous year. Battle Royale was first published in April 1999 by Ohta Publishing. In August 2002, it was released in a revised, two-part bunkobon by Gentosha.

Takami describes the characters as possibly all being "kind of alike", being "all the same" despite differing appearances and hobbies, and being static characters. Takami used these descriptions in contrast to the manga adaptation he wrote, with Masayuki Taguchi illustrating, which he believes has a more diverse and well-developed cast.

Battle Royale was translated into English by Yuji Oniki and released in North America by Viz Media on February 26, 2003. An expanded edition with a revision of Oniki's translation and an afterword by Takami was published on November 17, 2009, by Haikasoru, a division of Viz Media. This version also included an interview with the director of the book's film adaptation, Kinji Fukasaku. Viz released a new translation by Nathan Collins on April 1, 2014, under the title Battle Royale: Remastered. They also published The Battle Royale Slam Book: Essays on the Cult Classic by Koushun Takami on the same day, which includes essays on the details of the novel and the controversies surrounding it as well as its adaptations written by science-fiction, horror, and thriller authors such as Brian Keene, John Skipp, and Catherynne M. Valente.

== Adaptations ==
=== Manga ===
A manga adaptation, written by Takami and illustrated by Masayuki Taguchi, was serialized in Akita Shoten's Young Champion from 2000 to 2005. It was collected into fifteen tankōbon volumes, and published in North America by Tokyopop from 2003 to 2006.

A second manga, Battle Royale II: Blitz Royale, ran in Young Champion from 2003 to 2004. Written and illustrated by Hiroshi Tomizawa, it was collected into two tankōbon volumes.

In 2011, a two chapter spin-off manga titled Battle Royale: Angels' Border was drawn by Mioko Ohnishi and Youhei Oguma (each drawing one chapter). It focuses on the six girls who holed up in the lighthouse, was published in Young Champion and later combined into one tankōbon volume on January 20, 2012. The single volume was published in North America by Viz Media on June 17, 2014.

=== Feature films ===
Battle Royale was adapted into a 2000 feature film of the same name, directed by Kinji Fukasaku and written by his son Kenta Fukasaku. The film was also controversial and successful, with it being condemned by members of Japan's National Diet on grounds of it being harmful to the youth, yet becoming one of the year's highest-grossing films. It was followed in 2003 by Battle Royale II: Requiem.

In June 2006, Variety reported that New Line Cinema, with producers Neal Moritz and Roy Lee, intended to produce a new American film adaptation of Battle Royale. However, New Line never secured remake rights and, following the Virginia Tech shooting in April 2007, Lee stated that prospects for the project had been "seriously shaken." In 2012, Lee stated a remake would no longer be possible due to the release of the film adaptation of The Hunger Games, which has been criticized for its similarities to Battle Royale, stating, "Audiences would see it as just a copy of Games — most of them wouldn't know that Battle Royale came first. It's unfair, but that's reality." However, he stated that he might return to the film in ten years to "develop a Battle Royale movie for the next generation."

=== Theater ===
In 2012, the Sipat Lawin Ensemble and two other college theater groups in the Philippines, made an unofficial loose adaptation of the novel into a live-action performance called Battalia Royale, which had its debut at the Cultural Center of the Philippines. Performances were also held at an abandoned high school in Quezon City.

=== Television ===
On July 26, 2012, the Los Angeles Times reported that The CW Television Network had been in discussions with Hollywood representatives about the possibility of turning Battle Royale into an American television show. According to a spokesperson, the talks were only preliminary, but if a deal could be reached, the network would acquire rights to Koushun Takami's novel, then expand on it for an hourlong dramatic series. Joyce Jun, a Hollywood attorney representing U.S. rights to the title, states that "there is no deal in place." A CW spokesman only confirmed there had been some discussion, declining to comment further.

At the Television Critics Association winter press tour on January 13, 2013, CW president Mark Pedowitz stated "At this time, we're not planning to do anything with Battle Royale." He clarified that the reports stemmed from one phone call he made to see if the rights to the book were available and also noted that his interest in the novel predated the 2012 Aurora, Colorado, shooting and the Sandy Hook Elementary School shooting.

== Reception ==
Upon publication in 1999, Battle Royale became a best-seller in Japan. The original Japanese novel sold more than 1 million copies, before being translated into nearly a dozen languages.

The novel was entered into the 1997 Japan Horror Fiction Awards, but was eventually rejected in the final round with no winner that year. All three members of the final round's selection committee that year admitted Battle Royale was the best work, but declined to award it due to its controversial content. Hiroshi Aramata said that while it was the best nominee in terms of "story, structure, and subject matter," he felt it was too much of a Kinpachi-sensei parody and suspected its content would cause problems. Katsuhiko Takahashi felt that although it was the superior work as far as its construction as a novel, giving the award to a story about students killing each other at "this time" would hurt the reputation of the competition. Mariko Hayashi said that while she believed it was the best of the four novels, it was like reading an "unpleasant near-future manga" and "No matter how squarely it might be horror or how interesting it might be, I'm not so sure we should be writing stories like this." In 2001, Kōji Ōnuma wrote Battle Royale: Kyokugenshinri Kaisekisho (バトル・ロワイアル 極限心理解析書, Batoru Rowaiaru Kyokugenshinri Kaisekisho; roughly "Battle Royale: Analysis of Extreme Psychology"), a dissertation that explores the themes of the book.

Battle Royale has been critically acclaimed abroad. In Entertainment Weekly, writer Stephen King included it as one of the seven books in his 2005 summer reading list, after it was recommended to him by novelist Kelly Braffet (writer of Josie and Jack). King described Battle Royale as "an insanely entertaining pulp riff that combines Survivor with World Wrestling Entertainment. Or maybe Royale is just insane." He also notes that it has some similarities to his own novel The Long Walk. He concludes the brief review with a "No prob," as "Takami's Springsteen-quoting teenagers are fond of saying."

David N. Alderman, writing for the Red Room site, gave Battle Royale a score of 4½ out of 5 stars, stating that the "story itself is brilliant. Touted as being extremely controversial, especially for the time it was released, the book opens up all sorts of doors to conversations and thoughts about psychology, murder, survival, love, loyalty, and moral ground." While noting that those who "cringe at slash and hack" should "steer away from this" since "it is a bit gory," he states that it is "definitely worth the read" and concludes that it has "touches of romance, and definitely some great moral themes to spark off in-depth conversations with others." Complete Review gave the novel a B rating, describing it as "a perfectly fine thriller, with a fun premise, quite well drawn-out." In The Journal of the Lincoln Heights Literary Society, Tom Good praises the novel, concluding that, as "a pulp-fiction horror tale, Battle Royale delivers plenty of thrills, action, suspense and fun."

== Legacy ==
Since its release, the novel and its film adaptation have had an influence on later works. These include filmmakers such as Quentin Tarantino, most notably his Kill Bill films; the character Gogo Yubari, played by Chiaki Kuriyama, is similar to the character she plays in the Battle Royale film, Takako Chigusa. V.A. Musetto of the New York Post also compared it to The Condemned, which the critic called "a bad rip-off" of Battle Royale as well as The Most Dangerous Game. Critics have also noted the influence of Battle Royale on other later works, such as the 2008 film Kill Theory, the 2009 film The Tournament, and the 2016 film The Belko Experiment, and have noted similarities with the novel and film franchise The Hunger Games. The manga, anime and film franchise Gantz and the 2007 video game The World Ends with You have both been compared to Battle Royale.

The 2008 American young adult novel The Hunger Games by Suzanne Collins has been accused of being strikingly similar to Battle Royale in terms of the basic plot premise. While Collins maintains that she "had never heard of that book until her book was turned in", Susan Dominus of The New York Times reports that "the parallels are striking enough that Collins's work has been savaged on the blogosphere as a baldfaced ripoff," but argued that "there are enough possible sources for the plot line that the two authors might well have hit on the same basic setup independently." The general consensus in the time since has been one of amicable controversy, especially since the release of The Hunger Games film adaptation. Battle Royale author Takami said he appreciated fans "standing up" for his book, but stated that he thinks "every novel has something to offer," and that if "readers find value in either book, that's all an author can ask for."

The 2012 comic Avengers Arena has a similar plot to Battle Royale. Additionally, the cover of its first issue bears a homage to the Battle Royale film poster; featuring the main characters posed in the same manner and a similarly designed logo.

The novel and especially its film adaptation have been influential in global popular culture, inspiring numerous works of fiction in a number of different media, particularly in East Asia and the Western world. Since the film's release, the term "battle royale" has been used to refer to a fictional narrative genre and/or mode of entertainment inspired by the film, where a select group of people are instructed to kill each off until there is a triumphant survivor. The "battle royale" phenomenon has become especially popular in the 2010s. A video game genre with the same name became popular in the 2010s, with games such as PlayerUnknown's Battlegrounds, Fortnite Battle Royale, and Apex Legends setting player-count records. Other works focused on the doubt and mistrust among a group of people in a "murder game", such as the Saw film series, The Cube, and games in the Danganronpa series.

In 2021, Squid Game creator Hwang Dong-hyuk cited Battle Royale, particularly the manga version, as an inspiration behind the hit Netflix show.

== See also ==
- The Most Dangerous Game, a 1924 short story about a big game hunter who is hunted down by another hunter on an isolated island
- Lord of the Flies, a 1954 survival novel with a similar setting
- The Long Walk, a 1979 dystopian novel about contest
- The Hunger Games, a 2008 dystopian novel with a similar premise
