= Battle Royale (manga) =

Japanese manga series

- Cover of the first manga volume

バトル・ロワイアル (Batoru rowaiaru)
- Genre: Science fiction, thriller
- Manga
- Written by: Koushun Takami
- Illustrated by: Masayuki Taguchi
- Published by: Akita Shoten
- English publisher: NA: Tokyopop (former); Yen Press (current)
- Magazine: Young Champion
- Original run: 2000 – 2005
- Volumes: 15
- Manga

Battle Royale II: Blitz Royale
- Written by: Hitoshi Tomizawa
- Published by: Akita Shoten
- Original run: December 21, 2003 – May 27, 2004
- Volumes: 2
- Manga

Battle Royale: Angels' Border
- Written by: Koushun Takami
- Illustrated by: Mioko Ohnishi; Youhei Oguma
- Published by: Akita Shoten
- English publisher: NA: Viz Media
- Magazine: Young Champion
- Original run: February 22, 2011 – August 9, 2011
- Volumes: 1
- Manga

Battle Royale: Enforcers
- Written by: Koushun Takami
- Illustrated by: Yukai Asada
- Published by: Akita Shoten
- English publisher: NA: Viz Media
- Magazine: Bessatsu Young Champion
- Original run: February 1, 2022 – present
- Volumes: 5

Battle Royale (Japanese: バトル・ロワイアル, Hepburn: Batoru Rowaiaru) is a Japanese manga series written by Koushun Takami and illustrated by Masayuki Taguchi. It is based on Takami's novel of the same name, telling the story of a class of junior high school children who are forced to fight each other to the death. It was serialized by Akita Shoten in Young Champion from 2000 to 2005, and later combined into 15 tankobon volumes, which were released in English by Tokyopop from 2003 to 2006. In October 2007, a special edition of the manga began being released.

The manga follows the plot of the novel fairly closely, but expands on the backstory of each of the students. Much like the plots of the novel and film adaptation, the manga is noted for its intense and gory violence. The Tokyopop English adaptation of the manga makes several changes to the plot, such as claiming that "[The] Program" is a reality TV show and changing the time setting of the story by almost 10 years; both changes are contradicted in later volumes.

== Plot ==
Set in a near-future authoritarian Japan, each year a randomly selected junior high school class is forced to participate in a government-sanctioned survival program. Shiroiwa Junior High's Class B is taken to a remote island under the pretense of a school trip and fitted with explosive collars that will detonate if they attempt escape or break the rules. Armed with random weapons and given three days, the forty-two students must kill one another until only one survivor remains.

The narrative follows multiple perspectives among the class and expands their background, giving context to their character. Shuya Nanahara, driven by a sense of justice, resolves to resist the game and protect others, alongside the compassionate Noriko Nakagawa. They are aided by Shogo Kawada, a transfer student and former survivor of the Program who understands the system's brutality. Other students pursue different paths: the resourceful Shinji Mimura attempts to undermine the government from within; Hiroki Sugimura clings to loyalty and unspoken love; the traumatized Mitsuko Souma embraces ruthless self-preservation shaped by her past; and the emotionless psychopath Kazuo Kiriyama methodically hunts his classmates without hesitation.

== Characters ==
- Shuya Nanahara (七原 秋也, Nanahara Shūya) is a Japanese student and one of the three main protagonists. Shuya, who is nicknamed "Shu", lives in the fictional town Shiroiwa in Kagawa Prefecture.
- Noriko Nakagawa (中川 典子, Nakagawa Noriko) is the main female protagonist of the series. She is one of the class of third-year students in Shuya's school. Noriko has a crush on Shuya, whom she admired for his music and song-writing.
- Shogo Kawada (川田 章吾, Kawada Shōgo) is a transfer student and the winner of a previous Program. At the very beginning he meets Shuya and Noriko and joins up with the two of them.
- Kazuo Kiriyama (桐山 和雄, Kiriyama Kazuo) is the main antagonist, who tries to win the Program (using a coin-toss to decide whether or not he plays), killing the most students in the class making him the largest threat. It is later mentioned he had been in a car crash at a young age (where he witnessed his mother's death), causing brain damage and resulting in a lack of emotions and regret.
- Mitsuko Souma (相馬 光子, Souma Mitsuko) is the secondary antagonist, considered one of the most beautiful girls in the program, she is also the most deranged, and the female with the most kills, succeeding in using her feminine wiles and ability to feign emotions to manipulate then kill her classmates. It is later revealed that these psychological issues stem from her father leaving after her parents divorced, and the subsequent sexual abuse she received from her new stepfather as well as physical abuse from her own mother.

== Development ==
=== Writing style ===
At first the creators of the original version of the Battle Royale manga kept the story close to the original Japanese novel. As publication increased, Taguchi took increasing liberties with the story. Takami said that he looked forward to new installments of Taguchi's story and Taguchi said that he more strongly cared about the characters. Takami liked how Taguchi distributed the time among characters; Takami said that in the manga the characters changed and grew as the story progressed, unlike in the original novel. Taguchi said that in the manga version he modeled most of Takami's characters after people he personally knew. Takami describes Taguchi's stance as closer to his own than the stance of Kinji Fukasaku, the director of the film. Takami describes the manga as containing the feeling of "a general, nonjudgmental love for humans".

=== Art style ===
Taguchi said that many people describe his art style as "reminiscent of gekiga, or that it's realistic". Taguchi disagrees with the descriptions, instead characterizing faces in his works as "manga faces" since he feels that it is "really easy to put my own emotions into the faces". Taguchi said that when he shows sadness in characters, he locates the characters' eyebrows "down as far as possible". Takami describes Taguchi's art as "directly descended from Osamu Tezuka" and "manga-esque". Takami described the style as "easy to overlook" because the art contains "clean lines". Takami believed that the art style fit the Battle Royale story. In the beginning Taguchi said that he felt that all of the characters had to "look like middle school students". Taguchi said that as the story progressed for many of the characters he began to draw them "more naturally" and add "specific expressions for certain things they would say". Takami describes the newer style as "more grown-up looking".

=== English-language adaptation ===
An English-language release of the collected volumes, published in the United States, Canada, and United Kingdom by Tokyopop was extensively rewritten by Keith Giffen, whose script does not completely follow the original manga.

Their adaptation mentions several dates that change the time the story is set in by almost 10 years. It uses the line "in the near future", but on Shogo Kawada's profile, it references the 2005 "program"; he says his last program was a year ago, leading to the assumption that the manga sets the story in 2006. In volume one of the English-language version, Shinji Mimura and the news channel reporter mentions the 2007 record of three days, seven hours and twenty-two minutes. In volume 14, Kamon refers to the 2009 program. None of these dates are mentioned in the original Japanese version.

But the major difference between the Japanese and Tokyopop version is that Giffen rewrote the BR program as a reality TV show, rather than keeping it in tune with the BR act, which leaves plot holes through the manga, especially in volume 15. This can be partially attributed to the fact that when Tokyopop had released volume 1, the Japanese version was only up to volume 9 at that point, thereby not giving Tokyopop or Giffen ample material to prove that their rewrite would backfire.

According to Tokyopop editor Mark Paniccia, in the Newsarama article:

'For adapting the work, Giffen was given a tight Japanese-to-English translation of the story, but his assignment was by no means just to tweak a translation. "I told him to do what he felt he had to do", Paniccia said. "I told him to Giffenize it."'

To which Giffen responds:

'"It's a good story that Takami is telling", Giffen said. "What I do is go in and make bad scenes that much worse. I loved the movie of Battle Royale, and also love the manga. I just wanted to do it right. I wanted to do justice to it, and I knew I couldn't get away with doing a straight translation, because it would be horrifyingly bad."'

In April 2006, Tim Beedle, a former associate editor of the English version Battle Royale, stated on the Tokyopop Messageboard the reasoning behind the decision to have a fairly loose adaptation:

'Prior to starting work on the first volume of Battle Royale, its editor (Mark Paniccia, who has since left Tokyopop) made a decision to hire Keith Giffen, a well-known American comic book writer, to provide a much looser adaptation than usual. He made this decision for a variety of reasons, but two seemed to be more prominent than the rest. First, due to BR's extreme content and M rating, it was going to be a tough sell. (Some of the large chains refuse to carry M-rated books.) Hiring a known writer could help compensate for this by driving sales. Second, more than any other book we were publishing at the time, BR had the potential to find a crossover audience in the direct market among American comic book readers, who often are adverse to trying manga.'

The plot changes to turn the BR program into a reality show sponsored by the government held similarities to Suzanne Collins' 2008 novel The Hunger Games. John Green pointed out that the premise of the novel is "nearly identical". Although Collins maintains that she "had never heard of that book until [her] book was turned in", The New York Times reports that "the parallels are striking enough that Collins's work has been savaged on the blogosphere as a baldfaced ripoff", but that "there are enough possible sources for the plot line that the two authors might well have hit on the same basic setup independently".

Tokyopop released an "Ultimate Edition" of Battle Royale which consisted of 5 omnibus novels, with each novel having over 600 pages. The first volume was released on December 15, 2007, and the fifth and last on February 10, 2009. The Ultimate Edition has bonus features that consist of color pages, character sketches, weapon details, and Q&As with the author, Koushun Takami.

=== Other adaptations ===
Conrad Editora from Brazil began publishing a Portuguese version at the tail end of 2006. It follows the original 15-volume format, and does not adapt the Giffen "Reality Show" version (although the cover of the first edition mentions the reality show). It was cancelled after 12 volumes in 2007, but returned in 2011. Editorial Ivrea from Argentina published a Spanish version.

== Chapters ==
The following titles reflect the English-language version.

No.	Original release date	Original ISBN	English release date	English ISBN
1	November 29, 2000	978-4-253-14668-5	May 13, 2003	978-1-59182-314-8
Chapter 1: The Worst Game in History; Chapter 2: Best Friend; Chapter 3: Shinji Mimura; Chapter 4: The Oath; Chapter 5: Other Side of the Door; Chapter 6: Yoshio Akamatsu; Chapter 7: Trust; Chapter 8: Mitsuko Souma
We are introduced to the main characters and how the class was kidnapped and sent to the island. Most of this volume in set in the classroom and Yonemi Kamon's instructions about the program. Mr. Hayashida, the class teacher, is killed before the Program begins for resisting. Kamon shoots and kills Yoshitoki Kuninobu for attacking him after he, Kamon, says that he raped Anna Ryoko, the caretaker of the orphaned Shuya and Yoshitoki. Kamon also kills Fumiyo Fujiyoshi by throwing a knife in her head while she whispers during class. After the event begins, Yoshio Akamatsu kills Mayumi Tendo who is discovered by Shuya. Shuya knocks out Yoshio when he threatens Noriko and runs off and settles in the woods for the night. Yoshio is killed off by Kazushi Niida and finally, Megumi Eto, hiding in the residential area, is killed by Mitsuko Souma by slicing her neck open.
2	November 29, 2000	978-4-253-14669-2	July 15, 2003	978-1-59182-315-5
Chapter 9: Kazuo Kiriyama (Part One); Chapter 10: Kazuo Kiriyama (Part Two); Chapter 11: Treasure; Chapter 12: Those Who Come Forth; Chapter 13: Shogo Kawada; Chapter 14: Nightmare; Chapter 15: Conditions; Chapter 16: The Right Thing To Do; Sidestory: Energy
In this volume we are introduced to Kazuo Kiriyama and his gang. It is revealed, that due to Kazuo's apparent sociopathy, he determines whether to play the game by the flick of a coin. This inevitably begins his killing spree, including his entire gang, Izumi Kanai, and Yukiko and Yumiko. Sakura Ogawa and Kazuhiko Yamamoto commit suicide. Tatsumichi Oki attacks Shuya but kills himself by accident; Kyoichi Motobuchi also attacks Shuya but is killed by Shogo. Shuya and Noriko meet Shogo Kawada and team up to find more friends.
3	April 19, 2001	978-4-253-14670-8	November 10, 2003	978-1-59182-316-2
Chapter 17: Past; Chapter 18: Odds; Chapter 19: Problem Child; Chapter 20: Acceptance; Chapter 21: Forfeiture; Chapter 22: Battle Plan; Chapter 23: The Ultimate Team; Chapter 24: Takako Chigusa; Side Story: Fallen Angel
This volume is mainly about Shinji Mimura, when he finds close friend Yutaka Sato and begins his plan to defeat the program via implanting a worm into The Program's main computers. We also meet Yoshimi Yahagi and Yoji Kuramoto. later it introduces Takako Chigusa and Kazushi Niida.
4	July 12, 2001	978-4-253-14671-5	December 9, 2003	978-1-59182-317-9
Chapter 25: Honor; Chapter 26: Bond; Chapter 27: Respect and Affection; Chapter 28: Insanity; Chapter 29: The Right Answer; Chapter 30: Persuasion; Chapter 31: Everybody's Thoughts; Chapter 32: Secret Weapon
This volume continues Takako's fight with Niida, Niida is killed but Mitsuko kills Takako, Hiroki finds her dying body and she dies in his arms. Shinji is disheartened to discover that his plan has failed, yet it is discovered that the prodigy had a back-up plan by the way of his beloved, deceased Uncle and a well hidden Aunt. It shows some of Shogo's past with Keiko. Until it comes to Kaori Minami and Hirono Shimizu in a gunfight, Kaori shoots Hirono in the arm (she escapes) and Kaori is killed by Shogo.
5	November 8, 2001	978-4-253-14672-2	January 13, 2004	978-1-59182-318-6
Chapter 33: Rouse; Chapter 34: Last Girl Standing; Chapter 35: Trap; Chapter 36: Thirst; Chapter 37: Existence; Chapter 38: Set Up; Chapter 39: Anxiety; Side Story: Man of Justice
The volume It also continues Hirono's escapades until she is shoved into a well by Toshinori Oda and drowns. Shuya, Noriko and Shogo are staying in a nearby house while Noriko is resting from a wound.
6	April 4, 2002	978-4-253-14678-4	March 2, 2004	978-1-59182-418-3
Chapter 40: Sworn Friend; Chapter 41: Flower of Courage; Chapter 42: Parting; Chapter 43: Raid; Chapter 44: Hard Change; Chapter 45: Rescue; Chapter 46: Encounter; Chapter 47: Departure
This volume shows Shuya's fight with Kazuo, Hiroki Sugimura saves Shuya's life by jumping in the ocean with him from the crazed Kazuo. Hiroki then finds Yukie Utsumi and her gang who offer to help the unconscious Shuya (having received bullet wounds from Kazuo). Shogo runs away with Noriko away from the battle
7	August 8, 2002	978-4-253-14679-1	July 1, 2004	978-1-59182-419-0
Chapter 48: Bug; Chapter 49: Firing; Chapter 50: Demolition; Chapter 51: Team; Chapter 52: Versus; Chapter 53: Explosion; Chapter 54: Bonds; Chapter 55: Trajectory
In this volume, Shinji's plan is about to succeed, but they are distracted by Keita Iijima. Shinji argues with him (and accidentally kills him) Kazuo shows up and kills Yutaka. Shinji is shot multiple times in the upper body as well as his ankle making his guts spill out. Shinji then realises he must blow up the shed with Kazuo inside to get rid of the gun shooting menace. However Kazuo hid in a tractor and kills Shinji.
8	December 12, 2002	978-4-253-14680-7	August 3, 2004	978-1-59182-420-6
Chapter 56: Sixth Sense; Chapter 57: Unfortunate; Chapter 58: Liars; Chapter 59: Soap Opera; Chapter 60: Allure; Chapter 61: Sorceress and the Bullet; Chapter 62: Split Personalities; Chapter 63: Traumatic Games
In this volume, Mitsuko Souma bumps into Tadakatsu Hatagami and Yuichiro Takiguchi who capture her. Later on Yuichiro talks to Mitsuko and she realises that, unlike the other guys she's known, he does not want to sleep with her. Mitsuko finds a moment of solace with Takaguchi. But when Mitsuko tries to kill Tadakatsu after kissing him, he escapes and tries to shoot her, Yuichiro saves her by taking the bullet, Mitsuko finishes off Tadakatsu and rapes Yuichiro's dying body and kills him. We also get to learn a little about Mitsuko's troubled past.
9	March 27, 2003	978-4-253-14819-1	October 5, 2004	978-1-59182-865-5
Chapter 64: The Well; Chapter 65: Toshinori Oda; Chapter 66: Surviving; Chapter 67: From Afar; Chapter 68: Confession; Chapter 69: Doubt; Chapter 70: Crevice; Chapter 71: Collapse
In this volume, Hiroki continues his search for Kayoko Kotohiki, until he finds Toshinori, Kazuo shows up and kills Toshinori while Hiroki escapes. Later, Shuya wakes up in the lighthouse in the care of girls (one of them, Yuko Sakaki, witnessed the death of Tatsumichi Oki who was accidentally killed by Shuya) and sees Shuya as a "Demon Boy" due to her sensitive nature and belief in the lord and the Devil. Yuko poisons some stew that is meant for Shuya to get rid of him, but one girl, Yuka Nakagawa tastes it and dies, this is when the girls become panicked and Satomi Noda shoots all her friends (except Yuko) but she is finished off by the dying Haruka Tanizawa. Shuya hears the gunshots and runs to the kitchen.
10	July 24, 2003	978-4-253-14820-7	December 7, 2004	978-1-59182-866-2
Chapter 72: Yuko Sakaki; Chapter 73: Wish; Chapter 74: Reparation; Chapter 75: Funeral; Chapter 76: Rain; Chapter 77: Bleak Reunion; Chapter 78: Message; Chapter 79: Faith
Shuya finds all the girls' corpses and discovers the depressed Yuko. She runs to the top of the Lighthouse and commits suicide by jumping off but not before finding her faith again and forgiving Shuya. Shuya gathers the bodies together and laments their deaths and leaves. While on his way back to Noriko and Shogo, he stumbles across mentally deranged Mizuho Inada (she thinks she's in some kind of fantasy world). Shuya pleads with her, but to no avail, ignores Mizuho's gun shooting and clears off. He finds the bodies of Keita, Yutaka and Shinji and breaks down into tears while clutching Shinji's body, though an inscribed dying message telling Shuya to "Take the shot" from his deceased friend raises his spirits. Shuya is then reunited with Noriko and Shogo, Mizuho creates a shrine to speak to her God, but she is killed by Kazuo.
11	November 20, 2003	978-4-253-14821-4	February 8, 2005	978-1-59182-946-1
Chapter 80: Encounter; Chapter 81: The Tidings of Happiness; Chapter 82: Limits; Chapter 83: The Devil's Tactics; Chapter 84: Truth and Untruth; Chapter 85: Proposal; Chapter 86: Violent Fist; Chapter 87: Devil of Nothingness
Most of this volume is focused on Hiroki and Kayoko (he finds her) and we learn about how they first met. They both travel together to find Shuya until Kiriyama arrives. Although Hiroki manages to disarm him, Kiriyama seems to have learned from their previous encounters and quickly adapts to Hiroki's melee style.
12	March 25, 2004	978-4-253-14822-1	April 12, 2005	978-1-59532-446-7
Chapter 88: Despair; Chapter 89: Awakening; Chapter 90: Transcendental; Chapter 91: Copy; Chapter 92: Inversion; Chapter 93: Promise; Chapter 94: Incubation; Chapter 95: Reason
This volume continues the battle between Hiroki and Kiriyama, and Kiriyama gains the final advantage with his bulletproof vest from Toshinori in Vol 9. The injured Hiroki tells Kayoko to save herself but she refuses to leave and stays to die with him.
13	July 29, 2004	978-4-253-14823-8	July 12, 2005	978-1-59532-644-7
Chapter 96: Closed Off Future; Chapter 97: Natural Born Killers; Chapter 98: Magic Tool; Chapter 99: Where The Gun Points; Chapter 100: The Identity of the Heart; Chapter 101: Rejection; Chapter 102: Going Home; Chapter 103: The Thinking Heart
Mitsuko finds Kazuo and they both get into a gunfight, with Kazuo's kevlar giving him the edge once again. In desperation Mitsuko tries to seduce Kazuo but she is repeatedly shot and killed. Later on, Shogo's last nightmare in the program with Keiko is revealed as well as how she was killed.
14	January 13, 2005	978-4-253-14824-5	November 8, 2005	978-1-59182-343-8
Chapter 104: The Right Path; Chapter 105: The Final Battle; Chapter 106: Death Race; Chapter 107: The Pursuit; Chapter 108: Magician; Chapter 109: Hit; Chapter 110: God's Child; Chapter 111: Wishes
Most of this volume is a car chase between Shuya's gang and Kazuo, it ends in a gunfight and Noriko shoots Kazuo in the face (however he is not dead) and we learn about Kazuo's past and the origin of his psychopathic nature
15	April 20, 2005	978-4-253-14825-2	April 11, 2006	978-1-59816-203-5
Chapter 112: Cause and Effect; Chapter 113: Destiny; Chapter 114: Determination; Chapter 115: One's Last Moment; Chapter 116: Deception; Chapter 117: Inference; Chapter 118: Counterattack; Chapter 119: Hope
In this last volume, the battle between the three heroes and Kazuo finally comes to an end. With the visions and remembrance of his dead classmates, Shuya finds the will to protect Noriko and shoots Kiriyama dead. In the American adaption of the manga, Kazuo tells Shuya he can "feel again" before dying. Shogo seems to betray the two lovebirds, until an attack on the winners boat shows that Shogo's plan to defeat The Program has succeeded. Shogo kills Kamon and eventually dies of gunshot wounds from the battle with Kiriyama. Noriko and Shuya meet up with Shinji's aunt who helps them get to the boat, where they can begin their new life in New York City.

== Battle Royale II: Blitz Royale ==
Battle Royale II: Blitz Royale (BRII ブリッツ ロワイアル, BRII Burittsu Rowaiaru) was inspired by the film Battle Royale II: Requiem. While the author of the original novel, Koushun Takami, is given the "original work" credit, the story and art are by Hitoshi Tomizawa.

Like the earlier Battle Royales, a class of middle school students are picked to compete in fights to the death on an island until there is only one left.

The manga follows the point of view of Girl #10 Makoto Hashimoto (橋本真恋人, Hashimoto Makoto), an unlucky girl who fears that her class will be chosen to participate in "the program", a mysterious event that forces students to kill each other. Makoto attends Shikanotoride Junior High School.

After the encouragement of her best friend Itou Yamamoto and her mother she decides to face the chances. Her fears are supposedly put to rest when word spreads that all 50 Programs had already been executed in the year making them 100% unlikely to participate. Arriving at their field trip in one piece, Makoto begins to forward all her nervousness into getting a boy she likes: Nomura.

As the field trip kicks off, the girls sneak into one of the boys' rooms, specifically Nomura's. While Itou takes advantage of the smuggled Vodka Nomura breaks the ice between himself and Makoto by asking her out, however, their romance is cut short when a boy runs in alerting the presence of their teacher. The girls hide inside the sleeping bags of the other boys which Nomura takes the chance of to feel Makoto's breast. Right when they believe the coast is clear, they are assaulted by a group of Navy soldiers who begin to forcefully push the students around which involves Nomura getting the end of a gun smashed in his face.

The students are all held captive by the government, and brought to a room where a man in a military uniform, Hoshou Takagi, stands to address the students of the new Navy Exclusive version of the Program. While the students are recovering from the sudden announcement, the intoxicated Itou is grabbed by the hair and has her long locks forcefully shaved off. As Makoto rushes to her friends side she meets the end of a gun, and her father's talisman is ripped from her neck.

From this point the story becomes much darker, the students are sent to a non-aggressive defence school and forced to dispose of corpses. They are then gassed in a shower chamber, dressed in full military attire (complete with collar).

When given the chance to rebel against the government, Makoto declines causing Nomura to become aggravated calling her "Chicken Shit". However, when Boy #3 Mitsugu Kawasaki gets the same opportunity, he takes it but as he turns his gun to the soldier he becomes the first victim of the new program and has his collar detonated before all his classmates, killing him.

It is later revealed that Mitsugu is the brother of the winner from the first Battle Royale.

The volume ends with Makoto as the solo female survivor and solemnly swearing that she will not let another class experience what she and her class went through while watching another new generation of teenagers arrive on the island, implying that a new Program is about to begin.

=== Volume list ===
No.	Release date	ISBN
1	December 18, 2003	978-4-253-14861-0
2	May 27, 2004	978-4-253-14862-7

== Battle Royale: Angels' Border ==
Battle Royale: Angels' Border is written by Koushun Takami and illustrated by Mioko Ohnishi and Youhei Oguma (each drawing one chapter). Set within the continuity of the original Battle Royale novel, it contains two side stories about the girls that hole up in the lighthouse. The first episode follows the point of view of Haruka Tanizawa. The second one is devoted to Chisato Matsui and Shinji Mimura. It was published in Young Champion in 2011, and later combined into one tankōbon volume on January 20, 2012. The single volume was published in North America by Viz Media on June 17, 2014.

In the first episode, Haruka reveals through narration that she had recently realized that she is a lesbian and has romantic feelings for her best friend, Yukie Utsumi. However, she did not have a chance to come out before her class was pulled into the Program, and she struggles with her feelings while she, Yukie, and the others are hiding in the lighthouse. She wants to be close to Yukie, but at the same time knows that Yukie has a crush on Shuya Nanahara, whom the girls rescue after his near-fatal escape from Kazuo Kiriyama. Haruka also admires Yukie for her leadership, as her friend keeps the group together by reminding them that they all share their hope.

Each chapter of the episode concludes with a flash-forward to the events that lead the girls to turn on each other and the tragedy that results. The episode concludes with the injured Haruka's final act of fatally wounding Satomi Noda, who had killed Chisato and Yukie. Haruka dies when Satomi returns fire a final time before crumpling dead on the floor.

The second episode is primarily told in a flashback to the previous school year. Chisato has a chance encounter with Shinji on the train back to Shiroiwa, and after an incident with a surly passenger, the two hop off the train early and spend time together. Shinji takes Chisato on an impromptu date, and the two get to know one another. However, they come to a shared realization that they should not associate too closely with one another. Shinji's uncle was killed by agents of the government for engaging in anti-government activities, and Chisato's older brother, while suspected and subsequently cleared of the same, committed suicide. Because of these family ties, Shinji and Chisato speculate that the authorities may accuse them of conspiring against the government if they spend too much time together, and so they keep apart while maintaining strong places in their hearts for each other.

Like the first episode, each chapter of the second episode concludes with events that lead to the deaths of Shinji and Chisato. The ending also provides an explanation for why Chisato steps toward the gun on the table when Satomi threatens her and the others; an act that went without explanation or elaboration in the novel. Chisato's intent is to take the gun and throw it out of a window in order to show Satomi that she is not a threat. Only after it is too late does Chisato realize her mistake; Satomi reads Chisato's movement as aggressive, and kills her. As Chisato dies, she apologizes to Shinji for her failure.

No.	Original release date	Original ISBN	English release date	English ISBN
	January 20, 2012	978-4-253-14315-8	June 17, 2014	978-1-421-57168-3

== Battle Royale: Enforcers ==
Battle Royale III: Enforcers is written by Koushun Takami and illustrated by Yukai Asada. It began serialization in Akita Shoten's Bessatsu Young Champion magazine in February 2022. The series is also licensed in North America by Viz Media as Battle Royale: Enforcers.

== Legacy ==
According to its director, Hwang Dong-hyuk, the 2021 South Korean television show Squid Game was influenced by the manga version of Battle Royale.

== See also ==
- List of comics based on fiction
- Squid Game
