= List of Battle Royale characters =

List of characters in the manga Battle Royale

The following is a list of characters that appear in the novel, manga and film versions of Battle Royale.

== Primary characters ==
=== Shuya Nanahara ===
- Assigned weapon: Army Knife (novel and manga); Pot lid (film)

Boy #15 Shuya Nanahara (七原 秋也, Nanahara Shūya; romanized as "Shuuya" by Tokyopop) has witnessed a good deal of troubling events throughout his life. His father was killed by the government for struggling against the regime, and his mother died while he was in third grade. When the rest of his family rejected him, Shuya was put in an orphanage. He is willing to trust others, not wanting to take part in the Battle Royale program. He tries several times to rally fellow students in an attempt to escape, but fails. Consequently, he narrowly escapes death at the hands of his classmates on several occasions. Shuya is a self-proclaimed "rock star", listening to and playing rock 'n' roll music in spite of the ban on the genre, and his favorite artist is Bruce Springsteen. After the death of his best friend Yoshitoki, he vows to protect Yoshitoki's crush, Noriko. Shuya survives the contest and escapes. In the manga version he emigrates to the United States.

In the English manga, he has the nickname "Shu."

In the original novel, Shuya develops an anger and feels remorseless when he kills soldiers on the boat. In the manga, Masayuki Taguchi altered Shuya's personality so the characters could differentiate themselves, as he believed the serialization of the manga requires more of this aspect than other mediums such as novel and film. Taguchi described Shuya as developing a justice-oriented personality like "the character of a shōnen manga." As Taguchi developed Shuya's pacifistic characteristic, he decided to change the ending and allow for Shuya to spare the soldiers in the boat. Taguchi somewhat felt that Shuya pulled him into the story.

In the film, many of Shuya's characteristics are highly pruned, such as his love for Bruce Springsteen and rock 'n' roll music. However, in the film, he is still an extremely caring individual who desires for his classmates to halt their violence upon each other. In the end, after killing the administrator of the current Battle Royale, Kitano, he and Noriko become fugitives and are wanted by the government.

In the sequel to the film, Shuya becomes a terrorist, leading an army of youths who have either lost a family member or survived a Battle Royale, and declares war on all adults who support and administrate the Battle Royale Act. This forces the government to initiate a new BR Act, called BR II, which sends a single 9th grade class to a terrorist base in order to terminate the threats, with the targeted terrorist being Shuya.

Shuya's men spares few of those sent to his base, killing many of the students and earning the ire of the students who were their friends. Shuya takes the remaining soldiers as prisoners, constantly attempts to persuade them to join his cause, although he is often met with contempt, as the few remaining students in the class refuse to forgive him for the deaths of their comrades.

Eventually, a student named Takuma Aoi allies himself with the terrorist after Shuya offends the United States with a video encouraging the youth of all countries bombed by the US to rise up and rebel, which, in turn, forces the US government to bomb the base. Shuya and Aoi fend off the soldiers sent to storm the base, just long enough for them and their allies to escape while the base is bombed to ashes.

Shuya and Aoi reunite with their allies in Afghanistan and go their separate ways. In the films, Shuya is portrayed by Tatsuya Fujiwara.

Kills: Tatsumichi Oki (accident); Unspecified number of soldiers (novel); Kitano (film); Kazuo Kiriyama (manga)

=== Noriko Nakagawa ===
- Assigned weapon: Boomerang (novel and manga); Binoculars (film)

Girl #15 Noriko Nakagawa (中川 典子, Nakagawa Noriko) is the story's primary female character and Shuya's first companion, as well as, ultimately, his love interest. She is a quiet, reserved girl who is considered cute by Shuya. In the novel and manga, she is shot in the lower leg for attempting to help Yoshitoki Kuninobu; in the film, she is shot in the arm, although this wound is an accident. In both versions she falls ill and is treated for her fever by Shogo and Shuya at a pharmacy. Although she does not realize it, she manages to keep Shuya sane, and she is the only other person besides Shuya to survive the game. While innocent at heart, she is profoundly philosophical and inspires hope in Shuya and Shogo, and everything she says is true in the broader context of the novel. It is she who kills Kazuo Kiriyama, with the one and only bullet she fires during the course of the game (there is some confusion over this scene in the novel, as Shogo then shoots Kiriyama again and takes credit for the murder; the general consensus is that he is trying to spare Noriko the lifelong guilt of having killed someone). In the English-language version of the manga, after the game, her family supposedly rejects her (as her brother has been abducted by the police as a means to get her family to help look for her), so she emigrates to the United States with Shuya. In the film, teacher Kitano cares for Noriko, wishing her to win the game and reveals a picture of her as the victor when she, Nanahara and Kawada break into the school. He even goes into the island to look for her, giving her an umbrella in the rain. Shuya has commented that she wrote the best compositions in Literature class; as a result, when she speaks from her heart, her words are described as being "like poetry".

Aki Maeda portrays Noriko in the film adaptations.

Kills: Kazuo Kiriyama (novel), Unspecified number of soldiers (novel)

=== Shogo Kawada ===
- Assigned weapon: Remington Arms M31 sawed-off shotgun (novel); Remington Arms M32 Shotgun (manga); Franchi SPAS-12 (film)

Boy #5 Shogo Kawada (川田 章吾, Kawada Shōgo), portrayed as a loner within the class ranks, is a transfer student. He is put in Class B about two months before the program takes place. He is the winner of the current program (pretending to kill Shuya and Noriko) and a previous program which he participated in some three years prior. He allies himself with Shuya and Noriko, telling them he knows a way to escape from the island and the entire Battle Royale program. Noriko and Shuya frequently doubt his trustworthiness, but these doubts turn out to be unfounded, as Shogo reveals that he deliberately transferred to the school in hopes of being in the selected class. He is on a mission to avenge the death of his girlfriend, who died during the last program they played in. He along with Noriko and Shuya defeat Kiriyama. He helps overturn the program, helping Shuya and Noriko to escape, but he succumbs to his wounds and dies. In all versions he is the final participant to die.

In the novel, Shogo is described as having "the body of a middleweight boxing champion". In the manga he is also very muscular. He also is the only student with facial hair. Shogo has a distinct scar underneath his left eye caused from a knife wound when he won the program, the previous year. In the novel, Shuya also noted he saw Shogo had multiple gunshot scars all over his torso from when they would change in gym class.

In the manga flashbacks, his father was a doctor and ran a small poorly equipped local hospital. His father was self-employed and Shogo would occasionally help out, this is how he was able to treat Noriko's wounds with such expertise. His father was killed by the government, when he tried to protest Shogo's entering of the program. Shogo also had long hair in the flashbacks, as opposed to the present when he has it completely buzzed.

Koushun Takami describes Kawada as a "Young Champion-esque character" (the manga version of Battle Royale was serialized in Young Champion) and recalled that a person told him that Masayuki Taguchi's version of Shogo Kawada "looks like Bancho Kiyohara," referring to the Yomiuri Giants baseball player Kazuhiro "Bancho" Kiyohara. Readers of Young Champion ranked Kawada first in a character popularity poll. Taguchi felt that timing contributed to the ranking as a Kawada-centered story appeared at the time of the poll. Takami felt that Kawada would have received first place even if a Kawada-centered story had not appeared on the same pages as the poll.

Shogo is portrayed by Tarō Yamamoto in the film adaptation.

Kills: Kyoichi Motobuchi; Kinpatsu Sakamochi (novel); Kaori Minami (manga), Kazuo Kiriyama (film); Yonemi Kamon (manga)

Killed by: Kazuo Kiriyama, Nature (post-game)

=== Kazuo Kiriyama ===
- Assigned weapon: Knife (novel); Ingram MAC-10 machine pistol (manga); Paper fan (film)

Boy #6 Kazuo Kiriyama (桐山 和雄, Kiriyama Kazuo) is the player who kills the most students in the game.

In the novel and manga, Kiriyama is a sociopath with the mind of a genius and the inability to feel emotion, due to brain damage from a car crash in his childhood (in utero in the novel) that led to partial lobotomy. He is slender and handsome, with slicked back hair (which was initially styled by his gang member Mitsuru Numai, who idolises Kazuo) which he never changes the style of because he can't be bothered to. He came from a rich family, but in the manga profile and the novel it is suggested he is an illegitimate child. Kiriyama has a great intuitive grasp of everything, enabling him to not only do outstanding schoolwork, but also to master normally time-consuming skills such as painting, playing the violin, and various martial arts at a rapid rate. However, due to his emotionless state, he tends to set them aside after attaining mastery, and then losing interest in them moments afterwards. This quick intuitive grasp allowed Kazuo to be the first student to master the mechanics of the Program. In the manga, he also plucked out an abusive gym teacher's eyeball and crushed it with it still connected by the optic nerve, just to see the color of the liquid within. He was also the only male student not to fall for Mitsuko Souma's charms. Kiriyama is also shown to have a high tolerance for pain, such as when, after killing Mitsuko, he cuts his arm open and tapes the muscles that control his index finger back so as to permanently pull said finger back into a position that allows him to fire at a much more rapid rate.

During his time in school, Kiriyama became the leader of his own gang, consisting of Mitsuru Numai, Hiroshi Kuronaga, and Ryuhei Sasagawa. Despite their loyalty, he has no attachment to any of them and murders all of them during the Program. Kiriyama participates in the Program not out of necessity (as with most students), but only because he had nothing better to do, and succeeds in killing many of his classmates (fourteen total, fifteen if Shogo Kawada is counted, amounting to the most kills of all students), only to ultimately be killed in the end. In the novel, Noriko shoots Kiriyama in the head once, and then Shogo shoots him in the head again; at that point Shogo tells her that he killed Kiriyama to spare Noriko the guilt of murder. In the manga, Shuya ultimately kills Kiriyama by shooting him in the neck, though Kiriyama was able to regain his emotions from an earlier shot in the face, and moments before his death, he tells Shuya that he can feel again.

In the film, Kiriyama, not from Shiroiwa Junior High School Class 3-B, voluntarily joins the Battle Royale program for his own entertainment. Unlike his novel and manga counterparts, he displays emotion and takes enjoyment in killing students. Kiriyama is also depicted as mute and never speaks during the course of the film. In this adaption, the "Kiriyama family" gang members from the novel and manga, led by Numai instead, thought Kiriyama was in the league with Kitano, and tried to bully him to confess, but were killed by him. Shogo ultimately kills him by shooting and detonating his collar.

Kiriyama is portrayed by Masanobu Andō in the film adaptation. Gained weapons- Colt Python, 2 hand grenades, Uzi

Kills: Hiroshi Kuronaga, Ryuhei Sasagawa, Izumi Kanai, Mitsuru Numai, Yumiko Kusaka, Yukiko Kitano,(film), Yutaka Seto, Toshinori Oda, Mitsuko Soma, Shogo Kawada (post-game); Shinji Mimura, Mizuho Inada (novel and manga); Keita Iijima (film); Kayoko Kotohiki, Hiroki Sugimura (manga)±

Killed by: Shogo Kawada (film); Shuya Nanahara (manga); Noriko Nakagawa (novel)

=== Mitsuko Souma ===
Mitsuko Souma as she appears in the manga.

- Assigned weapon: Kama (Sickle) (novel, manga, and film)

Girl #11, Mitsuko Souma (相馬 光子, Sōma Mitsuko) is beautiful and seductive on the outside yet inside, she's a hollow shell, having been left permanently damaged after suffering physical and sexual abuse from her stepfather. She is said to be one of the most beautiful girls in school with her angelic face, shapely body, and seductive smile which is referred to in the novel as her "fallen angel's smile." She uses her sexuality to her advantage throughout the series. Similar to Kazuo Kiriyama, Mitsuko suffers from childhood trauma, and she is the leader of her own gang, which consists of Hirono Shimizu and Yoshimi Yahagi. She manages to kill a total of six (seven in the novel) students, becoming the second most dangerous opponent in the Program, before she finally gets killed by Kazuo Kiriyama.

In the novel, Mitsuko is abused by several individuals during her childhood. When she was nine years old, her mother took her to an old building in a run-down neighborhood. In the building, three men paid her mother to gang rape her and videotaped the events. When Mitsuko told a teacher what had happened, instead of getting the help she was looking for, the teacher raped her in the reading room after school. Mitsuko's friend at the time witnessed the rape and spread a rumor around school that resulted in the teacher getting fired. Mitsuko's mother tried to take her again to be raped for money, but Mitsuko accidentally killed her mother. She cleaned up the scene to make it look like a robbery gone wrong, and afterwards she sat on a swing in the park. She was then taken to live with distant relatives where their child harassed Mitsuko. When the child was hospitalized after falling off of their roof, the mother wrongly accused Mitsuko of pushing the child, but Mitsuko was defended by the father who began taking advantage of her shortly after. Being repeatedly violated in her youth shaped Mitsuko into a manipulative young woman with a twisted child's psyche. In the novel, she managed to kill seven students, the last of which (Kayoko Kotohiki) she kills seconds before Mitsuko was killed by Kiriyama.

In the manga, it was revealed that as a child, Mitsuko's biological father divorced his wife and eventually fled the country altogether, intending to protect her and young Mitsuko from the government. This left young Mitsuko completely heartbroken. Before he left, her father gave her a Magical Emily ring because he knew that she wanted to have one and also so that she could have something to remember him by. Mitsuko would later treasure the Ring and use it as a possible source of comfort even during the Program. Some time later, and when Mitsuko was nine years old, she then met her stepfather who ended up giving her a doll which was the only time he'd ever really shown her kindness along with the promise that they would be a family. Shortly after that, things changed as he then began subjecting both Mitsuko and her mother to all forms of abuse. In time, the damage was too much for even Mitsuko's mother to take and she too began abusing her own young daughter, presumably by physically assaulting her while her stepfather also subjected young Mitsuko to sexual abuse. Eventually, the horrific abuse Mitsuko had gone through left her damaged for life. By the time she became a teenager, Mitsuko turned into a manipulative young woman with a twisted sense of right and wrong. She also developed a habit of regularly seducing men, drugging them before having sex with them and then robbing them. She also made a deal with a local criminal to have her stepfather killed but the criminal ended up killing both Mitsuko's stepfather and mother before Mitsuko called the police on the unnamed criminal. In the English manga, she's nicknamed "Hardcore Souma" presumably due to her good looks. She uses much of her sexuality in the manga and often seduces men before having sex with them and later ends up either drugging them and stealing their money or just hurting them which she began doing during her tenure on the Program. During the Program, Mitsuko also becomes a killing machine who kills her classmates one by one as she seeks to win the game, including her former "friend", Yoshimi Yahagi. Prior to the Program, Mitsuko is feared by her female classmates and is the head of a girl gang. Her designated weapon is a sickle or a kama which she wields with incredibly lethal skill although she is seen using a gun with great skill. She also uses her good looks and body to seduce her male classmates so that she can catch them off-guard.

Due to her emotional abuse, she has a twisted idea of sex, thinking that it is the solution to everything, which led her to rape a wounded Yuichiro Takiguchi, thinking it would make him feel better. She became upset when he said that it hurt him, and thinking that he was rejecting her, she killed him. She later came across Kazuo Kiriyama, another student who similarly to Mitsuko had been responsible for the majority of the deaths during the Program and almost immediately, the two engaged in a gunfight. Having been shot in her right arm, Mitsuko then attempted to seduce him by stripping completely naked, a tactic she had used on other men in the past. However, due to his sociopathic behavior, Kiriyama did not fall for her act and proceeded to injure Mitsuko by regularly shooting her in random parts of her body which left her in agony and caused her to remember various moments of her life. Her childlike personality seizing control, Mitsuko began calling for her father while repeatedly saying "Magical Tool". Kiriyama then proceeded to end Mitsuko's life by shooting her through the face which destroyed her nose and eventually resulted in her death seconds later with her final thoughts being composed of her calling for her biological father and that he'd promised not to leave her.

In the extended version of the film, a flashback portrayed a young Mitsuko returning home from school. At home she found her mother severely drunk, along with an unknown man who had paid Ms. Souma to molest her daughter. Mitsuko, in self-defense, quickly pushed him down the stairs - the act happened to break his neck, instantly killing him.

In both the extended and standard versions of the film, she is depicted more to have been a socially awkward, anxiously vain outcast and loner with no friends who, upon provision of a lethal weapon and one very lucky encounter with a bitter classmate, broke down to desperation, madness and highly potentiated, wanton homicidality under the pressure of both the Program and her own mental disorders than the hyper-criminal, deeply feared school bully of the novel or manga (on the bus, a schoolgirl loudly and repeatedly, though not maliciously, disturbs her nap–Mitsuko says and does nothing; a scene depicting another female character being harassed by three female classmates at Shiroiwa High School does not see Souma as a perpetrator; additionally, she is herself terrorized at gunpoint by another female student, having "always pissed [the student] off". She is also invariably referred to by classmates in the film simply as "Mitsuko", her given name, and never "Souma", her familial Japanese "first" name; this likely reflects a class-wide attitude of disrespect and dismissal toward her). She is gunned down with her own firearm by Kazuo Kiriyama in a particularly violent sequence, dying completely alone as a "loser"–which she "just didn't want to be... anymore." Her total of six killings made her by far the deadliest permanent classmate in 3-B. It was rumored that she slept with a few guys at school and stole Hirono Shimizu's boyfriend; in the manga and film Mitsuko is the last girl to die.

She is played by Ko Shibasaki in the film, her "breakout" role. Shibasaki went on to become a major film/TV actress, J-pop star and model in Japan and throughout East Asia.

Kills: Megumi Eto, Takako Chigusa, Tadakatsu Hatagami, Yuichiro Takiguchi; Kayoko Kotohiki (novel and film); Hirono Shimizu (film); Yoji Kuramoto, Yoshimi Yahagi (novel and manga)

Killed by: Kazuo Kiriyama

=== Shinji Mimura ===
- Assigned weapon: Beretta 92 (novel, manga, and film)

Boy #19 Shinji Mimura (三村 信史, Mimura Shinji) uses his intellect to invent escape plans.

The novel describes Shinji as having "short hair" and wearing an "intricately designed [sic] earring" on his left ear. Shinji, the first-string shooting guard in basketball had the nickname "The Third Man." Shuya and Shinji became friends after the two performed well as a team during the second-year class basketball competition. The novel states that Shinji and Shuya had equal athletic skills, although Shinji would proclaim that he is more talented. Shinji's grades in subjects other than mathematics and the English language "weren't great." Instead Shinji has an "incredible" scope of real-world knowledge, "mature, way beyond his peers" views, and knowledge of information from outside of the Greater Republic of East Asia. The novel states that Shinji is "not arrogant."

In the novel and manga, his first plan is to hack into the government's computer and disable their collars, and then bomb the school. He is unsuccessful at hacking into the computer, since he discusses his plan with his friend Yutaka Seto, and the conversation is transmitted through his collar back to the teacher, who puts a stop to that plan. Shinji then attempts to bomb the building where the Program's staff is bunkered in, a plan which fails after a slight disruption that results in Shinji killing Keita Iijima. In the ensuing confusion, Kazuo shows up and kills Yutaka. When Kazuo enters the farm coop where Shinji and Yutaka were hiding in, Shinji detonates the bomb in the coop in an attempt to kill Kazuo. Despite the resulting explosion, Kazuo survives and guns down Shinji. In a series of flashbacks, it was also revealed that Shinji's uncle was a spy who taught him many things including how to hack systems and also how to make a bomb from items scattered around the island. His uncle later died although Shinji suspects that he was murdered by the government for being a spy. His manga profile also states that although he's sexually active, Shinji has displayed traits of misogyny. Shinji viewed Takako Chigusa, Mitsuko Souma and Sakura Ogawa as the prettiest girls in the class.

In the film, Mimura meets with Iijima and Yutaka immediately. Mimura discovers that his collar is bugged early on, so they plot to bomb the school. They nearly succeed, but Kiriyama discovers the group and kills Yutaka and Iijima. As Kiriyama fires on him, Mimura detonates the group's bomb, killing him and blinding Kiriyama, unintentionally catalyzing the events that would lead to Kiriyama's death at the hands of Shogo. He also survives much longer in the film than in any other adaption, dying moments before Shogo kills Kiriyama at the film's climax.

Shinji is portrayed by Takashi Tsukamoto in the film adaptation.

Kills: Keita Iijima (novel and manga); self (film)

Killed by: Kazuo Kiriyama (novel and manga); self (film)

=== Hiroki Sugimura ===
- Assigned weapon: Tracking device homed in to collar's frequencies (novel, manga, and film)

Boy #11 Hiroki Sugimura (杉村 弘樹, Sugimura Hiroki) spends most of the program time looking for Kayoko Kotohiki, the girl he loves, and his best friend, Takako Chigusa.

The novel describes Hiroki as "reserved" and as having a "tall, lanky body." Hiroki "projected toughness" because he studied martial arts. Hiroki has a "shy" demeanor and does not socialize that much with the other boys. The novel stated that people who began to "know [Hiroki] a little" discovered that Hiroki "turned out to be nice." Hiroki enjoys reading Chinese poetry; because the Greater Republic of East Asia considers China to be "part of our homeland," translations of Chinese books are easy to find in Japan.

In the manga, Hiroki is said to be the tallest boy in the class (5"11 in manga profiles). He has long dark hair & a slightly effeminate face. He and Kiriyama engage in battle three times (more than any of the other characters); however Kiriyama always seems to come out on top. When he encounters Kiriyama for the third and final time, they engage in an intense bloody fight. Hiroki tries his best and is able to draw blood, but for the most part Kazuo is able to predict all his moves. In the process, Hiroki loses three fingers, all of his fingernails, one eye, and is hit many times. He is initially saved from death by Kazuo leaving him to target Kayoko, who has a gun: this allows him to steal Kazuo's Uzi machine gun and hit him three times in the chest and once in the arm. Hiroki and Kayoko both assume that he is dead. Kayoko comes over to comfort Hiroki in a loving moment, but Kazuo arises. Hiroki notices too late, as he remembers that Oda had a bulletproof vest and Kazuo took it. Before he can reach for the gun, Kazuo shoots him in the stomach. Hiroki tells Kayoko to run, but she stays with him. Kazuo then shoots Kayoko in the back of the head, killing her, and proceeds a second later to kill Hiroki by shooting him in the face. They die in each other's arms.

In the manga flashbacks, we see Hiroki being bullied at a very young age, thus his reason for taking up martial arts. Another flashback shows him falling in love with Kayoko's "beauty & grace" when watching her from afar during her flower arrangement classes, his martial arts teacher made the remark "she'd be good for you" leaving Hiroki red and embarrassed.

When he finds Takako, she is near death, and he comforts her. In the novel and film Kayoko becomes frightened and fatally injures Sugimura. In the manga, Kayoko decides to travel with him. However, they are both soon killed by Kiriyama.

Koushun Takami, author of the novel and co-author of the manga version of Battle Royale (with Masayuki Taguchi), said that the manga version emphasizes Sugimura's fear of being "violent."

In the film adaptation, Hiroki is portrayed by former actor Sousuke Takaoka.

Killed by: Kayoko Kotohiki (novel and film); Kazuo Kiriyama (manga)

=== Takako Chigusa ===
- Assigned weapon: Ice pick (novel and manga); Jackknife (film)

Girl #13 Takako Chigusa (千草 貴子, Chigusa Takako) is an athletic girl (the fastest sprinter on the track team) and the most beautiful girl in the school.

Takako is described as a little fierce- yet aristocratic-looking with upward-curved eyes, a sharp chin, a well-defined nose, a well-formed mouth and arched eyebrows. Her long hair has orange streaks running through it and she enjoys wearing jewellery such as bracelets, rings and earrings, much to the opposition of her teachers. Takako is known for being the prettiest girl in her class and is described so by several students, including Shuya Nanahara, Shinji Mimura and Kayoko Kotohiki. She is very close with Hiroki Sugimura, her only friend in the class since her best friend, a girl called Kahoru Kitazawa, goes to another school. Takako is a very gifted athlete, her 200m track record is the second best in the history of the prefecture. On the island, she is approached by Kazushi Niida, a boy she despises because of his immaturity and the fact that he spread a rumour of him going out with Takako. When she refuses to team up with him, he threatens to rape her and attacks her. She gouges out his eyes and crushes his penis and scrotum, finally killing him with her issued ice pick. In the novel, Takako then notices Mitsuko standing nearby and talks with her for a short time where the latter confesses that she was always a little envious of Takako because of her beauty and her being "a better girl". Mitsuko then shoots her three times in the back and leaves her for dead. Severely wounded, she is found by Hiroki a while later. She tells him that he has become "quite a stud." He compliments her back but as she thanks him, she dies in his arms.

In the film she is approached by Niida and attacks him after he shoots her in the face with his crossbow when Takako refuses to sleep with him, scarring her beautiful face. This a relatively easier fight than in any version as Niida merely runs away after Takako threatens him. She then pulls out her knife and briefly chases him before stabbing him in the back, the crotch, and finally in the chest, killing him. As soon as Takako gets up from Niida's corpse she sees Mitsuko pointing a gun at her and runs through the woods while Mitsuko chases her, firing four shots to her back before letting Takako run away. Takako manages to hold out until sundown before succumbing to her wounds, where Hiroki finds her, she compliments him and tells him to stay with her before she dies in his arms.

The manga version presents a significantly more violent fight on Niida's part, giving him a better chance of actually killing Takako before he dies. Niida calls Takako "Robobitch" several times during their encounter which is the name she is referred to by some students due to her cold and arrogant attitude. In the manga, after Takako kills Niida, Mitsuko is standing behind her and fatally shoots her in the back before walking away. Later, she is found by Hiroki while dying. It is hinted that Takako may have been in love with Hiroki, asking him if they could have been more than friends. When he does not respond, she realizes that he has a crush on someone else and tells him a "secret," telling him that he was her most precious friend, only to die in his arms.

Takako is played by Chiaki Kuriyama in the film. Kuriyama's character in the film Kill Bill is based on her portrayal of Takako.

Kills: Kazushi Niida

Killed by: Mitsuko Souma

=== Yukie Utsumi ===
- Assigned weapon: Browning Hi-Power (novel and manga); Smith & Wesson .357 Magnum revolver (film)

Girl #2 Yukie Utsumi (内海 幸枝, Utsumi Yukie) is an intelligent, caring girl and Haruka Tanizawa's best friend. In the novel she is a member of a non-distinct group of girls referred to by the novel as "the neutrals". Yukie has natural leadership skills and is a model student, as well as being the female class representative. She, like several other girls in her class, has a crush on Shuya Nanahara whom she met in elementary school in April on a rainy day while trying to organize the volleyball and little league teams in the gym. She and Haruka worked well together on the volleyball team and Yukie was the setter. She was held in high regard by most of her classmates, as both Shinji Mimura and the proud Takako Chigusa considered her to be trustworthy. She was often a better leader than the male class representative Kyoichi Motobuchi, this is shown especially in the Program.

During the game, she gathers Haruka and several other girls and hides in an abandoned lighthouse. Hiroki delivers an injured Shuya and brings him in. Yukie admits that she is in love with him, and in the manga she kisses him. Another girl, Yuko Sakaki, is suspicious of Shuya (she witnessed Oki's accidental death and assumed Shuya meant to kill him while holding a very strong belief in the fact that Shuya is a demon). Yuko decides to poison his food, but the food meant for him is instead eaten by Yuka Nakagawa, who quickly dies. As a result, the girls become paranoid and turn on each other and the resulting bloodbath and carnage results in Yuko being the only survivor. In the novel and manga, Yukie is gunned down by Satomi when she fires a warning shot. Yukie is the thirtieth to die. Her manga profile states that she was likely to be eliminated mid-way to late into the Program, depending on the number of allies she had.

In the film, Yukie comes up with the plan to gather as many of the girls as possible together, and have them think things through and try to work out a way off of the island. She manages to get Haruka Tanizawa, Yuka Nakagawa, Satomi Noda, Chisato Matsui, and Yuko Sakaki, and they lock themselves in a lighthouse. After Hiroki Sugimura delivers an injured Shuya Nanahara to the lighthouse after an encounter with Kiriyama, Yukie takes care of him and dresses his wounds; she also convinces the other girls to let him stay. When Shuya awakens, Yukie tells him who has died while he was out, stating that Mizuho Inada, Kaori Minami, Yuichiro, Tadakatsu, and Toshinori died. After Yukie tells Shuya who's hiding with her, she asks him about the incident with Oki as Yuko witnessed it. Shuya firmly claims that it was an accident and also tells Yukie about Shogo Kawada's plan to escape from the island.

Shortly afterward, Yukie tells him that she knows everything about him and then asks if he knows what that means which he is confused by. She brushes it off and tells him that it's lunch time and she will bring him his food. Yukie later announces to the other girls that Shuya is awake and in good condition. She tells Haruka to get Yuka from watch and she tries to calm Satomi and Yuko down as they are scared of what may happen in the days to come. After Yuka joins the group, Yukie gathers the girls to tell them of Kawada's plan and suddenly Yuka dies from the food that was poisoned by Yuko. Satomi freaks out and blames Chisato, who then pins the blame on Haruka, all while Yukie tries to calm everyone down. Chisato accuses Yukie of poisoning the food to run off with Shuya and, just before she goes for her gun, she is killed by Satomi. Horrified, Yukie grabs her gun and shoots at Satomi, while Haruka joins in. The three girls get into a violent gun fight and all three fall, with Haruka killed. Satomi gets back up to finish off Yuko but decides not to and while she laments about not seeing the next day, she is shot by a dying Yukie.

Shortly after she kills Satomi, Yukie laments the lack of trust of her friends (In the Japanese version, her final word is "baka" meaning "moron", "fool" and/or "idiot").

Yukie is portrayed by Eri Ishikawa in the film adaptation.

Kills: Satomi Noda (film)

Killed by: Satomi Noda

== Supporting male characters ==
=== Yoshio Akamatsu ===
- Assigned weapon: Crossbow (novel, manga, and film)

Boy #1 Yoshio Akamatsu (赤松 義生, Akamatsu Yoshio) is the first student to leave the school where they are briefed in all versions of the series.

Yoshio Akamatsu is one of the class of third-year students at the fictional Shiroiwa Junior High School. A large boy who performs poorly in sports, Yoshio is frequently bullied, particularly by his classmate Ryuhei Sasagawa. Yoshio is said to be 180 cm tall in the novel (about 5'11"). He is a timid, quiet student, who is often paranoid about being mistreated by his peers. In the manga, a flashback of Yoshio being asked for help with a video game by Shuya Nanahara can be seen. Shuya had told Yoshio that he considered him a friend.

In all versions, after killing girl #14 Mayumi Tendo, Yoshio trips down a small hill during his attempt to kill Nanahara, blinded by fear of his own death. He rises in a huff to find Kazushi Niida standing nearby. Kazushi then shoots Yoshio with an arrow from his own crossbow. The book says that Kazushi shoots him in the back of the neck accidentally after panicking. In the film, Kazushi shoots Yoshio in the heart instead of the neck after panicking. In the manga, the attack is deliberate and is done by Kazushi Niida: when Yoshio awakens, he panics and looks for his crossbow. However, Kazushi shoots him in the side of the head, killing him instantly.

Yoshio is portrayed by Shin Kusaka in the film adaptation.

Kills: Mayumi Tendo

Killed by: Kazushi Niida

=== Keita Iijima ===
- Assigned weapon: Kitchen knife (novel and manga); Jutte (film)

In the novel and manga, Boy #2 Keita Iijima (飯島 敬太, Iijima Keita) is a loner who is a former friend of Shinji Mimura. The two have had a falling out, due to Keita's refusing to help fight the street gang harassing Shinji, in his spite of losing a bet, though Iijima is also said to be a coward, which Shinji refused to take into account. When Keita wishes to join Yutaka Seto and Shinji, Shinji points a gun at Keita and tells him to leave. Shinji fires the gun in an attempt to scare him off, but accidentally hits and kills him. This begins a chain of events which leads to the ultimate failure of Mimura's plan. In the manga, Keita is known to vomit in disgust when he sees something revolting, such as when Kazuo Kiriyama plucks out the eyeball of a gym teacher and crushes it in front of everyone, and when Yonemi Kamon shows the class the decaying corpse of Masao Hayashida.

In the film, Iijima is shown to be laughing at inappropriate times---in the beginning, Kitano demands to know what was funny, to which he gave no answer. Iijima is still Mimura's friend, and he travels with Mimura and Yutaka. In the end Kazuo Kiriyama kills Iijima and Yutaka, but Iijima's last words were that they will be together when they escape.

Killed by: Shinji Mimura (novel and manga); Kazuo Kiriyama (film)

=== Tatsumichi Oki ===
- Assigned weapon: Hatchet (novel and film); Machete (manga)

Boy #3 Tatsumichi Oki (大木 立道, Ōki Tatsumichi; Romanized Ooki in the English manga) cracks under the pressure of the situation in all versions of Battle Royale.

In the manga, Oki is a new student. Oki is a member of the school's handball team. After the game starts, he goes insane and attempts to kill Shuya and Noriko. After a fall with Shuya, his weapon becomes lodged in his face, killing him instantly (the film version shows him walking for several seconds before falling dead on the ground). Yuko Sakaki witnesses the fall, and believes Shuya to be deliberately responsible for Oki's death, leading to her attempted murder of Shuya and the subsequent lighthouse massacre.

Killed by: Self (accident)

=== Toshinori Oda ===
- Assigned weapon: Bulletproof vest (novel, manga, and film)

Boy #4 Toshinori Oda (織田 敏憲, Oda Toshinori) In the English manga, he is nicknamed "Froggy" for his appearance.

In the novel and manga, Toshinori attempts to kill Hirono Shimizu by strangulation while she is drinking water from the well. She then shoots him twice in the stomach, though she is unaware he is wearing a bulletproof vest. He sneaks up on her again, strangling Hirono with his belt (in the manga, pushing her into the well where she drowns), Toshinori takes her gun & hides in the area. Later he encounters Hiroki Sugimura, with his back to Toshinori, he tries the same stealth tactic, this time wearing a bikers helmet, though Hiroki's senses danger due to his training in martial arts, he dodges the gunshots and he somersaults into the air, attacking Toshinori, breaking his index finger. The two have a very brief meeting, because Kazuo Kiriyama ambushes the both of them, Hiroki flees and manages to escape, while Toshinori plays dead, though still gripping his gun. Toshinori attempts to launch his own ambush, planning to catch Kazuo off guard. However Kazuo picks up on this and easily dodges jumping over his gunfire, he then launches a counter-attack and shoots Toshinori in the groin many times, killing him. In the novel Kiriyama shoots into Toshinori's helmet.

In the film he never encounters Hirono or Sugimura, instead introduced riding a bike to escape Kiriyama, who "kills" him; Oda begins laughing in victory when Kiriyama leaves. His victory is quickly cut short when he sees Kiriyama brandishing a wakizashi and is beheaded; Kiriyama then picks up the head, places a hand grenade inside Toshinori's mouth and throws it into Shogo's hideout.

In the novel and manga, little more than an ugly rich kid (his father owning a successful produce company) with high views of himself, Toshinori sets out to preserve his talents with the violin. Toshinori loathes the students in his class, calling them the 'vulgar masses'. He hates Shuya because Shuya is handsome and plays rock music, which Toshinori has a great disdain for. He is incredibly jealous of Kazuo Kiriyama, who is both richer and more skilled with the violin than he is.

Kills: Hirono Shimizu (novel and manga)

Killed by: Kazuo Kiriyama

=== Yoshitoki Kuninobu ===
- Assigned weapon: None (killed before Program begins)

Boy #7 Yoshitoki Kuninobu (国信 慶時, Kuninobu Yoshitoki) is Shuya's best friend. He is cheerful and does not lose his temper easily. In the Japanese version, he's the only character aside from Noriko who calls Shuya by his first name. He is killed by Kamon/Sakamochi/Kitano before the game begins.

In the novel and manga, after Sakamochi/Yonemi Kamon reveals that he has raped Yoshitoki's guardian (orphanage overseer) who protested about her two charges being involved in the Program, Yoshitoki lashes out at the teacher in a fit of rage. Showing hatred for a government official is illegal, so Sakamochi orders him to be fired at by the government men standing nearby. He is shot on the left side of the mouth which knocks out most of his teeth and severs his tongue. It leaves him with the inability to speak. He is left to bleed and die before Sakamochi decides to put him out of his misery and shoot him in the head, killing him. In the manga he is shot in the face personally by Kamon, who later executes him as a mercy killing. Later on in the manga Shuya revealed that Yoshi's parents had gotten divorced when he was very young and his mother had then abandoned him, prompting Yoshi to be taken into care where he eventually met Shuya and the two ended up developing a strong friendship. Earlier on, he tells Shuya he has a crush on Noriko. Because of this Shuya does his very best to protect Noriko from danger.

In the film, Yoshitoki had stabbed Kitano in the buttocks at school, leading to Kitano's resignation. When the children appear for the program, after Kitano kills Fumiyo and Noriko is shot in the chaos, Yoshitoki attacks Kitano. In revenge, Kitano slashes Yoshitoki's buttocks. After Yoshitoki argues and fights with Kyoichi Motobuchi, Kitano detonates Yoshitoki's collar.

Yoshitoki is portrayed by Yukihiro Kotani in the film adaptation.

Killed by: Several soldiers (novel); Kitano/the detonation of his collar (film); Yonemi Kamon (manga). He is one of the few characters to be killed by a different character in each version of Battle Royale, though this is merely due to each version having their own "teacher".

=== Yoji Kuramoto ===
- Assigned weapon: Dagger (novel); Box Cutter (manga); Rope (film)

Boy #8 Yoji Kuramoto (倉元 洋二, Kuramoto Yōji) is a quiet boy, who is the novel is described as having "latin" looks. He is in a relationship with Yoshimi Yahagi. In the manga, they first met at a cinema.

In the novel and manga, during the program they have a dispute (Yoji claiming he never loved her) and then reconcile, only to both be killed shortly thereafter by Mitsuko. In the film the two commit suicide by hanging.

Kills: self (film)

Killed by: Mitsuko Souma (novel and manga); self (film)

=== Hiroshi Kuronaga ===
- Assigned weapon: Paper fan (Novel and Manga); Knife (film)

In the novel and manga, Boy #9 Hiroshi Kuronaga (黒長 博, Kuronaga Hiroshi) is a member of Kiriyama's street gang. After being told by Kiriyama to meet with the other gang members at a certain point on the island, he, along with the other gang members, are killed by Kiriyama. He is one of the shortest boys in the class and was described as quiet but arrogant, through he was less aggressive than the others.

In the film, he is in a group of students who bully Kiriyama; he dies with the rest of the group.

Killed by: Kazuo Kiriyama

=== Ryuhei Sasagawa ===
- Assigned weapon: Ingram MAC-10 (novel); SG 552 Commando (manga); Uzi submachine gun (film)

In the novel and manga, Boy #10 Ryuhei Sasagawa (笹川 竜平, Sasagawa Ryūhei) is a member of Kiriyama's street gang with long blond hair. He is noted as the loudest and most arrogant member of the gang and was extremely grateful to Kazuo, after he pulled some strings to stop his younger brother from being arrested by the cops. He frequently bullies Yoshio and is best friends with Hiroshi. After being told by Kiriyama to meet with the other gang members at a certain point on the island, he, along with the other gang members, is killed by Kiriyama.

In the film, he is in a group of students who bully Kiriyama; he dies with the rest of the group. He is the one who pointed his gun at Kiriyama's head before he spits at him, causing Ryuhei to temporarily losing concentration and allowing Kiriyama to grab his gun to kill him and his group.

Killed by: Kazuo Kiriyama

=== Yutaka Seto ===
- Assigned weapon: Fork (novel, manga, and film)

Boy #12 Yutaka Seto (瀬戸 豊, Seto Yutaka), the class clown and the shortest boy, allies with Shinji Mimura and helps him gather the materials for the bomb plan. In the film Keita Iijima is also part of his group.

In the novel, Yutaka likes Izumi Kanai, and wants revenge on the program for her death. This is part of his motivation in helping Shinji execute his plan.

In the manga, Yutaka has a crush on Fumiyo Fujiyoshi. Yonemi Kamon killed Fumiyo Fujiyoshi, therefore he feels especially motivated to help Shinji, calling the bomb they intend to make "Fumiyo's revenge".

In the manga, while preparing the finishing touches to their bomb, Yutaka accidentally shines a flashlight outside, this later attracts Keita Iijima to the farmhouse where they are hiding. After Shinji accidentally kills Keita, Yutaka loses his trust in Shinji, but the two reconcile after Yutaka considers the numerous times Shinji has forgiven him for his mistakes (such as misplacing the pulley needed to transport the bomb). Shinji embraces him & the two share a friendly hug, but Kazuo Kiriyama unexpectedly ambushes both of them. Yutaka is shot numerous times in the side of the head before he has time to react. Yutaka collapses while Shinji runs into the farmhouse for cover, having been severely injured himself. When Yutaka lies of the ground almost dead he sheds a tear, at which point Kazuo shoots him once more in the head, killing him.

In his flashbacks in the manga, Yutaka meets Shinji when he is being bullied by some older thugs in an alley. Shinji mistakes Yutaka for being "a little kid", but Yutaka corrects him and says they are in the same year, which shocks Shinji. Shinji then continues to take down the two thugs, and learns after Yutaka got into a fight because he was protecting a helpless puppy. Shinji deeply admires sticking up for the weak, and the two become best friends.

In the film, Yutaka mistakes Kazuo for Shuya upon seeing him; he is fatally shot along with Keita and Shinji (though not before Shinji detonates the bomb in a failed attempt to kill Kazuo).

Killed by: Kazuo Kiriyama

=== Yuichiro Takiguchi ===
- Assigned weapon: Aluminum baseball bat (novel); S&W Model 629 Performance Center (manga); Machete (film)

Boy #13 Yuichiro Takiguchi (滝口 優一郎, Takiguchi Yūichirō), an otaku, is very naïve and a bit too friendly. He hides with his friend Tadakatsu and has a crush on Mitsuko.

In the novel, when Mitsuko attempts to kill Tadakatsu, they capture her. Yuichiro sympathizes with Mitsuko, going so far as to take a bullet meant for her. Mitsuko, shocked by his genuine kindness, shows him more compassion than any other, holding his body and even giving him a genuine kiss. She comforts Yuichiro before shooting him in the stomach thrice to quickly put him out of his misery. In this version, Mitsuko actually felt some compassion towards Yuichiro and only killed him so he didn't die slowly.

In the manga, when Yuichiro takes the bullet for her, Mitsuko responds by trying to have sex with him, hysterically believing that sex would stop his pain. When he screams at her to stop, she drives her scythe into his throat just as he reaches climax, believing that he betrayed her trust by saying it hurt.

In the film, he and Tadakatsu are seen nude, stabbed to death while Mitsuko, putting on her clothes, leaves the area, implying that she seduced them to lower their guard and struck when they were most oblivious.

Killed by: Mitsuko Souma

=== Kazushi Niida ===
- Assigned weapon: Shamisen (novel and manga); Coathanger (film)

Boy #16 Kazushi Niida (新井田 和志, Niida Kazushi) is a sleazy, awkward boy.

In the novel he is a member of the soccer (football) team. Kazushi kills Yoshio after finding him unconscious (which, in the English manga, he took thrill and exhilaration in doing), and then comes upon Takako Chigusa. In the manga, aside from desiring to rape Takako Chigusa, he attempts to shoot her when she runs from him. A vicious fight ensues, and ends with Kazushi being impaled with one of his own arrows. In the novel, Takako gouges out Kazushi's eyes, crushes his genitals, and viciously stomps on his throat before thrusting an ice pick into his mouth. In the film, he also tries to force Takako to join him, as well as persuade her to sleep with him. While arguing, he accidentally fires an arrow at her, scraping and scarring her flawless face. She retaliates and chases him, repeatedly stabs him in the genitals and chest, resulting in his death.

Kills: Yoshio Akamatsu

Killed by: Takako Chigusa

=== Mitsuru Numai ===
- Assigned weapon: Walther PPK (novel); Walther P99 (manga); Colt Python (film)

In the novel and manga, Boy #17 Mitsuru Numai (沼井 充, Numai Mitsuru) is Kiriyama's loyal second-in-command in the street gang. He was an aggressive classmate who had bullied a number of other students during flashbacks such as Yoshio Akamatsu. After Kiriyama passes a note and tells the gang to meet him at the "southernmost end of this rock" which is the reef on a battle royale map. Mitsuru happens to stumble upon the dead bodies of his fellow gang members (along with Izumi, an innocent bystander). He is betrayed by Kazuo, who tells Mitsuru he has decided upon a coin flip to play the programme. Mitsuru opens fire, Kazuo dodges easily and unloads many of his own rounds, most of them hitting Mitsuru in the face. He dies almost instantly.

In his Flashback sequence, in both the novel and manga, he is shown as having an alcoholic father and living in a broken home. He had an obsession with becoming strong but this misguided him into bullying. On one occasion he was bullying Ryuhei Sasagawa in the school library, but was then surrounded by three older bullies who mercilessly beat him up, breaking two of his fingers and knocking out some of his teeth. Kazuo Kiriyama saves him and beats up the bullies. From that moment on Mitsuru was indebted to Kazuo and became his most loyal servant. Numai's manga profile stated that he had a chance of winning should Kiriyama be eliminated early on.

In the film he is the leader of the students who bully Kiriyama; he dies with the group.

Killed by: Kazuo Kiriyama

=== Tadakatsu Hatagami ===
- Assigned weapon: S&W M19 (novel); Aluminum baseball bat (manga and film)

Boy #18 Tadakatsu Hatagami (旗上 忠勝, Hatagami Tadakatsu) is a tall, athletic boy who is friends with Yuichiro. The two hide together.

In the novel, Tadakatsu played on the baseball team. Shuya was Tadakatsu's friend. The two stopped seeing each other after Shuya quit baseball and began playing the guitar, which was highly discouraged in the Greater Republic of East Asia. Tadakatsu's mother had an "uptight" attitude against guitar playing.

In the novel and manga, he captures Mitsuko after she attacks them. After Yuichiro releases Mitsuko, she seduces Tadakatsu by taking off her bra in an attempt to kill him. They start to have sex and make out. At this point Mitsuko attempts to kill him by slicing his jugular vein with a razor while they are kissing, however due to his amazing reflexes he developed while being in the baseball team, he narrowly avoids death, only receiving a small cut. Tadakatsu chases a topless Mitsuko with his gun, and accidentally shoots Yuichiro when he jumps in front of her. While Tadakatsu is distracted by this, Mitsuko throws her kama into his shoulder. In the novel she then smashes his head with his bat, killing him. In the manga the kama also hits his eye, and head, causing his death.

In the film, he and Yuichiro are seen stabbed dead and nude in an area while Mitsuko is leaving.

Killed by: Mitsuko Souma

=== Kyoichi Motobuchi ===
- Assigned weapon; Smith & Wesson Model 36 . Chief special (novel and manga); S&W Model 19 (film)

Boy #20 Kyoichi Motobuchi (元渕 恭一, Motobuchi Kyōichi) is an intelligent but stuck-up student. He is the class representative and the son of a government official, which made him mistakenly think that he could not be selected for a Battle Royale because of his father's station. When he was selected for the Program, he cried that there must be a mistake, to which the teacher talked about equality, and that Kyoichi is no different from anyone else. Driven insane by his desire to live and to please his father, Kyoichi attacks Shuya, but has his arm blown off by Shogo, who continues to blow a hole in his stomach, killing him.

Killed by: Shogo Kawada

=== Kazuhiko Yamamoto ===
- Assigned weapon: Colt Python (novel and manga); Headband (film)

Boy #21 Kazuhiko Yamamoto (山本 和彦, Yamamoto Kazuhiko) is Sakura's longtime boyfriend. The novel describes Kazuhiko and Sakura as "the most intimate couple in the class."

After reuniting, the two have a talk and eventually decide not to play the game at all. They soon die when they throw themselves off a cliff, landing into the ocean and drowning. In the novel and manga, the two jump when they hear a person approaching; the person approaching is revealed to be Yukie, who only wants to help them, and is distraught at seeing them die.

Masayuki Taguchi, creator of the manga version, felt that he fully grasped how to portray the suicide of Sakura and Kazuhiko.

Killed by: Self (jumping off a cliff).

== Supporting female characters ==
=== Mizuho Inada ===
- Assigned weapon: Double-bladed knife (novel); .44 Auto Mag pistol (manga); Kitchen knife (film)

Girl #1 Mizuho Inada (稲田 瑞穂, Inada Mizuho) spends most of her time living in a fantasy world, thinking of herself as a beautiful warrior. On the island, due to the intense and bloody circumstances, her mind breaks down and she begins to actually believe in the fantasy. She is best friends with Kaori Minami and Megumi Eto. Toshinori Oda referred to the three girls as "daydreamers".

In the novel, while believing she is an enlightened warrior for the god Ahura Mazda, she creeps behind Kazuo in an attempt to stab him; he shoots her in the shoulder and head without even looking backwards. This is her only appearance in the novel. In this version of the story she is the last girl to die.

In the manga, she attacks Shuya, who tries to persuade her to join them to escape the island, but due to her damaged mentality, she keeps shooting at him until her gun runs out of bullets. At this point, Shuya finally gives up as Mizuho changes the cartridge, and Shuya escapes. After that, she succumbs to her delusional world, and believes it to be a reality. She creates an overly elaborate shrine to her fictitious god, believing that it would save her from any harm, and Kiriyama kills her while she is worshipping there. Her manga profile states that she could win depending on how deep she succumbed to her delusions.

In the film she and Kaori say goodbye to each other at the beginning of the Program and are shown to have joined forces; they are later seen stabbed to death next to a life preserver. The two had killed one another.

Kills: Kaori Minami (film)

Killed by: Kazuo Kiriyama (novel and manga); Kaori Minami (film)

=== Megumi Eto ===
- Assigned weapon: Diving knife (novel and manga); Stun gun (film)

Girl #3 Megumi Eto (江藤 惠, Etō Megumi; romanized Etou in the manga) is a shy girl who is close friends with Mizuho Inada and Kaori Minami, and in the film she is Noriko Nakagawa's best friend. In the novel and manga, she hides in an abandoned house. She tries to use her cellular phone to call her parents, but the teacher answers instead.

In the novel, Megumi ends the call and hears Mitsuko enter the house. Sakamochi, the teacher, calls again, alerting Mitsuko to Megumi's presence. In the manga, Megumi crushes her phone with her hand, and after hearing someone break into the house, becomes frightened. Wishing the person to be one of her friends, her luck fails as Mitsuko discovers the phone.

In the novel and manga, Mitsuko tells Megumi that she is scared, as well, and wants to team up with her. Megumi, overjoyed believes her, but Mitsuko instead slits her throat (in the manga her nape is slit instead), revealing that she had been lying the whole time and is actually playing to win. Mitsuko then remarks that red isn't really Megumi's colour before leaving the house altogether. Megumi is the fifth student to die in the manga.

In the film Megumi, who is a photographer, has a crush on Mimura. Megumi takes refuge inside an abandoned house when Mitsuko enters the house and intimidates Megumi. Mitsuko compares their weapons and takes Megumi's stun gun. When she seems to be handing the stun gun back to Megumi, Mitsuko begins to attack her and a brief chase happens. Mitsuko places her weapon next to Megumi's throat before slashing her throat open.

Megumi is often bullied (especially by Hirono Shimizu). In the film, after Megumi is killed and Hirono confronts Mitsuko, Hirono defends Megumi as well as her friend Yoshimi.

Killed by: Mitsuko Souma

=== Sakura Ogawa ===
- Assigned weapon: pen knife (novel); Unspecified in manga and film

Girl #4 Sakura Ogawa (小川 さくら, Ogawa Sakura) is one of the most attractive girls in the class, and Kazuhiko's longtime girlfriend. The novel describes Sakura and Kazuhiko as "the most intimate couple in the class."

She and Kazuhiko meet on the island and decide to kill themselves by jumping off a cliff. Before she left the class room she secretly gave a note to Kazuhiko to meet at the northern peak, only Shuya notices.

In the novel and manga, Yukie witnesses their deaths, and is very upset.

Masayuki Taguchi, creator of the manga version, felt that he fully grasped how to portray the suicide of Sakura and Kazuhiko.

Killed by: Self (jumping off a cliff).

=== Izumi Kanai ===
- Assigned weapon: Time bombs (novel and manga); Hand grenades x2 (film)

Girl #5 Izumi Kanai (金井 泉, Kanai Izumi) is a student.

In the novel, Izumi is a girl who is part of a non-distinct group of girls referred to by the novel as "the neutrals." Izumi's father is a town representative. The novel describes her as a "preppy."

In the novel and the Japanese version of the manga, Izumi happens to be in the area where the "Kiriyama Family" meets. Kiriyama is uncertain as to fight the teacher or kill them all, so he flips a coin to decide. He then kills them all. In the novel she happens to be in the area. In the English manga Ryuhei and Hiroshi capture Izumi and bring her to be raped.

In the film she is with a group of students who bully Kiriyama; she is the last of the group to be killed. She survived the first wave of bullets from the submachine gun, begged Kiriyama to spare her, but he killed her with a second wave.

Also in the book, Yukata (Shinji's best friend) has a crush on her and is dismayed when she is one of the first to be killed.

Killed by: Kazuo Kiriyama

=== Yukiko Kitano ===
- Assigned weapon: Darts and dartboard (novel and manga); Megaphone (film and manga)

Girl #6 Yukiko Kitano (北野 雪子, Kitano Yukiko) is a feminine, domesticated girl who likes to bake cakes for her best friend Yumiko. She has a crush on Shuya. On the island, she and Yumiko decide to use Yumiko's megaphone to call the other students and discuss things as a group. However, this attracts the attention of Kazuo Kiriyama, who quickly kills both of them. In the novel she dies after Yumiko, the only variation of Battle Royale that she died after Yumiko. Despite her surname is the same as the teacher's in the film, they are not related.

Killed by: Kazuo Kiriyama

=== Yumiko Kusaka ===
- Assigned weapon: Hand grenades x2 (novel and manga); Wakizashi (film)

Girl #7 Yumiko Kusaka (日下 友美子, Kusaka Yumiko) is an athletic tomboy and Yukiko's best friend. She has a crush on Shuya, but does not want to admit it to Yukiko, since Yukiko likes him, too. On the island, she and Yukiko decide to use her megaphone to call the other students and discuss things as a group. However, this attracts the attention of Kazuo Kiriyama, who quickly dispatches both of them, although Yumiko isn't completely dead. In the film Kiriyama places the megaphone to Yumiko who begins wailing into the megaphone as he shoots her on the ground. In the manga he does the same, but doesn't make her scream into the megaphone. In the novel she dies before Yukiko because of her wounds from the gunshots.

Killed by: Kazuo Kiriyama

=== Kayoko Kotohiki ===
- Assigned weapon: S&W Model 59 (novel); S&W Model 19 (manga); Glock 17 with stainless slide (film)

Girl #8 Kayoko Kotohiki (琴弾 加代子, Kotohiki Kayoko) is a playful, energetic girl who is a member of a tea ceremony class. She is unaware that Hiroki Sugimura has a crush on her. She hides during most of the game, avoiding confrontation, until Hiroki finds her.

In the novel and film, the frightened Kayoko shoots Sugimura, who tells her that he loves her as he dies. Kayoko is obviously distressed by Sugimura's last words and begins sobbing over her actions. Afterwards Mitsuko kills Kayoko, commenting that Kayoko should have understood Sugimura's words.

In the manga, Hiroki Sugimura after a long desperate search finally is reunited with her. She initially threatens to kill him if he does not turn away and leave her. But he manages to make her see sense, and the two travel together with the intent of meeting back with Shuya, Shogo and Noriko. However they are ambushed by Kazuo Kiriyama. When Hiroki is about to be killed, Kayoko, inexperienced with guns, fires a couple of shots which manage to distract Kazuo, failing to hit him. Though this gives the injured Hiroki time to steal Kazuo's sub machine gun, he then fires at Kazuo hitting him many times, once in the arm and three times in the torso. They assume he is dead. However Kazuo was wearing a bulletproof vest, and when Sugi and Kayoko are sharing a loving moment, Kazuo stands over the couple and continues to shoot first Kayoko then Hiroki in the head. They die instantly in each other's arms.

In Kayoko's flashbacks, she meets Hiroki in school when he is trying to look after a stray kitten, but has no idea what to do. Kayoko mentions she has a pet cat at home and offers to take it in, and the two form a friendship. Kayoko admitted that before she properly spoke to Hiroki she was afraid of him, because he practiced martial-arts and thought he was a bad person.

Kills: Hiroki Sugimura (novel and film)

Killed by: Mitsuko Souma (novel and film); Kazuo Kiriyama (manga)

=== Yuko Sakaki ===
- Assigned weapon: Telescoping spring baton and Potassium cyanide (novel and film); hydrocyanic acid (manga)

Girl #9 Yuko Sakaki (榊 祐子, Sakaki Yūko; ES, FR, NL) is a troubled girl with big ears, who witnesses Oki's accidental death and blames Shuya for it, often referring to him as a demon. Later, she joins up with several other girls and hides in an abandoned lighthouse. When the girls find Shuya and bring him in, she poisons his food. The food, however, is instead eaten by Yuka Nakagawa, who quickly dies. The girls soon turn on each other and kill each other in a violent gun fight. Yuko survives this confrontation.

In the novel, her alcoholic and abusive father died in the hands of a yakuza, which led her family to be able to live in peace, but the abuse still left Yuko nightmares, and left her terrified of gore and violence. In the manga, it is clear that Yuko has an extremely high paranoia level (Shuya pointed out that she was crying when everyone awakened on the island). After witnessing Mitsuru and Tadakatsu in Class 3-B fight, she refused to go to school for a while, and locked herself in her room. Her mother, Kaori Sakaki (榊 かおり, Sakaki Kaori), and father, Soichiro Sakaki (榊 宗一郎, Sakaki Sōichirō), try to comfort her, but she closes her door on her father's fingers and realizes that anyone could be violent. In the English-language adaptation of the manga, she is a Buddhist, and sometimes saw a psychiatrist named Dr. Chiodo and a pastor named Pastor Min.

In the novel and manga, Yuko runs from Shuya. When she gets to the top of the lighthouse, her foot slips, and she falls. Shuya catches her and tries to pull her up, despite his severe injuries. Yuko realizes that Shuya is responsible for saving her life, even though he suffers agonizing pain, and this leads her to realise that he is good after all; her friends died in vain. Yuko pries her hand free from the bars, and falls to her death. Yuko dies thirty-third in the manga. Her manga profile states that she had a very high chance of suicide and was likely to be killed early on, somewhat ironically since she ranked ninth place when she died.

In the film, Yuko hears Shuya struggling with the door after he hears loud noises. Yuko opens the door and realizes she was responsible for her friends' deaths, and apologizes to Shuya (acknowledging that he is as much a victim in the game as she and her friends were) before proceeding to commit suicide by jumping off the lighthouse.

Kills: Yuka Nakagawa (accident); herself

Killed by: herself

=== Hirono Shimizu ===
- Assigned weapon: S&W Model 10 (novel and manga); M1911 pistol (film)

Girl #10 Hirono Shimizu (清水 比呂乃, Shimizu Hirono) is a rebellious girl.

In the manga and novel, she is a girl with short, spiked hair who was part of Mitsuko's gang of bad girls, which got her involved with drugs, prostitution, and larceny.

On the island, Hirono gets into a gunfight with Kaori, which Shuya bravely attempts to quell. In the novel, Hirono shoots Kaori dead and runs away. In the manga, she expresses interest in Shuya's offer to join him in finding a way out of the Program, but runs away after Kaori shoots her in the shoulder.

In the novel and manga, Hirono uses her entire water supply to treat her wounds. However, she suffers from sepsis, and becomes severely dehydrated. When she tries to get water from a well, she is attacked by Toshinori Oda. She shoots him and leaves him for dead. However, it is soon revealed that he is wearing a bulletproof vest, and gets up to attack her again. In the novel he strangles Hirono with a belt. In the manga Toshinori pushes Hirono down the well, where she drowns during a final dream in which she climbs out, her dehydration gone, and finds Shuya and company who deactivate and remove her collar and tell her there is a way to escape the game. Her body is later discovered by Hiroki Sugimura who mourns her. Her manga profile states that she had a chance of winning should Mitsuko be eliminated.

In the film, Hirono confronts Mitsuko. Hirono accuses Mitsuko of killing Megumi, Yoshimi, and Yoji, pimping Yoshimi, and stealing Hirono's boyfriend while Mitsuko had sexual intercourse with other men. Hirono then mercilessly beats Mitsuko until Mitsuko uses her stun gun to take Hirono's gun; once Mitsuko takes Hirono's gun, she fatally shoots Hirono two times in the back as Hirono runs away.

Kills: Kaori Minami (novel)

Killed by: Toshinori Oda (novel and manga); Mitsuko Souma (film)

=== Haruka Tanizawa ===
- Assigned weapon: Spatula (novel); Stun baton (manga); Browning Hi-Power (film); Hammer (Angels' Border)

Girl #12 Haruka Tanizawa (谷沢 はるか, Tanizawa Haruka) is Yukie's best friend. The novel describes Haruka, a member of a non-distinct group of girls referred to by the novel as "the neutrals," as "exceptionally tall." She is also captain of the school volleyball team.

She hides with Yukie and several other girls in an abandoned lighthouse. However, soon they turn against each other, and kill each other in a violent gun fight. Haruka does not participate until Satomi kills Yukie, and is shot several times in the side when grabbing her friend's gun. She finishes Satomi off by shooting her in the eye, while she herself lay dying. Haruka dies thirty-seconds later. In the film Haruka does not kill Satomi.

Kills: Satomi Noda (novel and manga)

Killed by: Satomi Noda

=== Mayumi Tendo ===
- Assigned weapon: Nunchaku (novel and manga); Boxing gloves (film)

Girl #14 Mayumi Tendo (天堂 真弓, Tendō Mayumi) is an attractive girl who is friends with Izumi Kanai and Yukie's gang. She is quickly killed by Yoshio as she exits the school. Perched on the roof, he shoots her dead. In the novel she gets an arrow to the back, while in the manga she receives an arrow through the head. In both the manga and novel Mayumi's corpse is the first object encountered by Shuya outside of the school. In the film Mayumi receives an arrow through her neck and dies shortly after she asks Shuya about the arrow.

Killed by: Yoshio Akamatsu

=== Yuka Nakagawa ===
- Assigned weapon: CZ 75 (novel); Luger P08 pistol (manga); Micro-uzi (film)

Girl #16 Yuka Nakagawa (中川 有香, Nakagawa Yūka) is a chubby, cheerful girl who hides in an abandoned lighthouse with Yukie Utsumi, Haruka Tanizawa, Chisato Matsui, Yuko Sakaki and Satomi Noda. They then find Hiroki holding Shuya, who is injured. They take in Shuya and prepare a stew. Yuko, however, thinks Shuya intentionally killed Tatsumichi Oki, even though it was an accident. While Yuko is preparing soup for Shuya, she slips potassium cyanide into it. Yuka says that she will have a taste of the soup, and dies after eating the poisoned food meant for Shuya. This sparks a gunfight and eventual massacre between the girls in the lighthouse. Although Yuka has the same surname as Noriko, the two have no relation to one another as "Nakagawa" is a very common surname in Japan.

Killed by: Yuko Sakaki (accident)

=== Satomi Noda ===
- Assigned weapon: Uzi submachine gun (Novel and Manga); Remington Model 870 (Movie)

Girl #17 Satomi Noda (野田 聡美, Noda Satomi) is a model student. Satomi wears wire-rimmed glasses which the novel says fits her "calm, intelligent face."

Satomi was one of the girls who joins Yukie Utsumi and her group at the lighthouse. Her designated weapon was an Uzi submachine gun in all versions, which she uses to kill all of her friends. As soon as she left the school Satomi joined the group of girls that Yukie Utsumi put together. In the film, Satomi moans about only living until the next day. Yukie comforts her, telling her that she will find a way out of the scenario.

After Yuko Sakaki tries to poison Shuya Nanahara, but accidentally kills Yuka Nakagawa, the girls suspect each other, thinking that one of themselves is the murderer. Satomi realizes she should kill her friends since she has the chance to and win the program. She was the first one to become panicked enough to grab her gun and points it at her friends. Satomi kills Chisato Matsui, Yukie Utsumi, and Haruka Tanizawa in all versions but the details vary.

In the novel and manga, Satomi shoots Chisato three times in the back first after she goes for Yuka's gun. Satomi claims afterwards that Chisato was guilty of poisoning Yuka and that Chisato's murder was in self-defence. Yukie rejects this, saying that Satomi killed Chisato because she just wanted to. Satomi gets ready to shoot Haruka because Haruka told Yukie to kill her. While Satomi's back is turned, Yukie points her gun at Satomi, and hesitates because she only wants to disarm her. This gives Satomi the chance to turn around and fatally shoot Yukie. Haruka dives for Yukie's gun but Satomi shoots her too. Thinking that Haruka is dead, Satomi turns to Yuko, the last girl standing. In the manga she encourages Yuko to join her, and that she will protect her. In the novel she also says that Yuko is 'different'. Haruka then uses the last of her energy to shoot Satomi in the head, killing her. In the novel, Satomi's Uzi goes off as she falls, almost tearing off Haruka's neck.

In the film, Satomi shoots Chisato dead, then ends up in a gunfight with Yukie and Haruka. Satomi successfully kills Haruka and mortally wounds Yukie, but sustains injuries herself. As in the other versions, Satomi speaks her last words, of mercy, to Yuko. However, in the film Yukie shoots Satomi dead before dying herself, not Haruka.

At three kills, Satomi has the third-highest number of victims in The Program, behind Mitsuko and Kiriyama.

Kills: Chisato Matsui, Yukie Utsumi, Haruka Tanizawa

Killed by: Haruka Tanizawa (novel and manga); Yukie Utsumi (film)

=== Fumiyo Fujiyoshi ===
- Assigned weapon: None (killed before Program begins)

Girl #18 Fumiyo Fujiyoshi (藤吉 文世, Fujiyoshi Fumiyo) is the quiet, caring nurse's aid. She's caught whispering during the presentation, and the teacher, angered at Fumiyo disobeying him throws a knife into her forehead which kills her as a result. In the novel and manga, she is the second student to be killed, while she is the first to die in the film. She is good friends with Yukie Utsumi, and in the bus she's seen bullying with Kayoko Kotohiki. In the manga, Yutaka has a crush on her, and named Shinji's plan "Fumiyo's Revenge".

Killed by: Kinpatsu Sakamochi (novel); Kitano (film); Yonemi Kamon (manga). Fumiyo is one of the few characters to be killed by a different person in each version, though this is due to a new "teacher" in every version.

=== Chisato Matsui ===
- Assigned weapon: IMI Desert Eagle (novel); Luger 9mm (manga); Walther PPK (film)

Girl #19 Chisato Matsui (松井 知里, Matsui Chisato) is one of Yukie's friends. The novel describes Chisato, a member of a non-distinct group of girls referred to by the novel as "the neutrals," as "always quiet and withdrawn." Chisato is a petite girl with long hair. She had a crush on Shinji Mimura and in the Manga, she and Yuka were apparently "Boy crazy".

Chisato was one of the girls who teamed up with Yukie Utsumi and the others at the lighthouse. She cooked the meal, along with Haruka Tanizawa, which made the others suspicious of her when Yuka Nakagawa was poisoned. When the girls all became paranoid and panicked, Satomi Noda grabbed the uzi, and when Chisato moved to get Yuka's gun, Satomi shot her three times in the back. In the manga, after Satomi begins accusing Chisato of poisoning the food, Chisato becomes increasingly paranoid, believing that everyone is going to side with Satomi. Chisato grabs Yuka's gun, thinking that the others will have to listen to her if she has it, however, when she points it at Satomi, Satomi responds by shooting Chisato in the stomach with the machine gun, killing her instantly. In the film, she also accuses Yukie of poisoning the meal in order to run off with Shuya Nanahara alone before grabbing a gun.

Killed by: Satomi Noda

=== Kaori Minami ===
- Assigned weapon: SIG P230 (novel); SIG P226 (manga); Pickaxe (film)

Girl #20 Kaori Minami (南 佳織, Minami Kaori) is a fan of various pop idols, especially of Junya Kenzaki. She is friends with Megumi and Mizuho, although Mizuho's fantasy games annoy her. On the island, Kaori finally loses her sanity after accidentally killing a kitten, and she gets into a gunfight with Hirono. She then ends up shooting Hirono in the arm. After trying to kill Shuya, Shogo kills her by shooting her in the head with his shotgun. In the novel, Kaori is distracted by Shuya during her gunfight with Hirono, allowing Hirono to shoot her in the head.

In some of the flashbacks in the manga, she is constantly bullied by Mitsuko's gang; gang members usually steal her money. Other students label her "pizza face" to insult her due to her acne problem that she was sensitive to; during the program she goes insane because of this and often chants out the sentence, "No more pizza face!".

In the film, she says goodbye to Mizuho Inada after her name is called, promising they will still be friends. The two are later shown to have joined forces, but are seen stabbed to death next to a life preserver. The two killed each other.

Kills: Mizuho Inada (film)

Killed by: Hirono Shimizu (novel); Mizuho Inada (film); Shogo Kawada (manga). She is one of the few characters to be killed by a different person in every version of Battle Royale.

=== Yoshimi Yahagi ===
- Assigned weapon: M1911 pistol (novel and manga); Plastic hammer (film)

Girl #21 Yoshimi Yahagi (矢作 好美, Yahagi Yoshimi) is a rebellious girl with long, wavy hair. Yoshimi is in a relationship with Yoji Kuramoto, whom she met while watching a movie.

Yoshimi Yahagi is one of the class of third-year students at the fictional Shiroiwa Junior High School. She was a member of an all-girl gang headed by Mitsuko Souma, along with Hirono Shimizu. Yoshimi used to regularly steal from and torment her classmates. She often singled Kaori Minami out of the girls. Yoshimi is described in the novel as one of the more urban girls in Shiroiwa; she never saw a sickle before in her life.

In the manga during flashbacks, Mitsuko and her gang prostitute themselves to get money. At this point Yoshimi is a virgin and upon mentioning this, two of the male clients continue to rape her. Even Mitsuko doesn't treat her very nice and manipulates Yoshimi frequently. So when she meets Yoji by chance while watching an emotional movie to which Yoji is crying, and he treats her with care and affection, she falls for him.

In the novel and manga, Yoshimi is thrilled when she manages to meet up with Yoji, but is shocked when he attacks her. They talk briefly, and Yoji starts to realize that he could not kill Yoshimi because he loves her. Before they could do anything, Mitsuko appears and kills Yoji; in the novel, Mitsuko stabs Yoji's head with her sickle, while in the manga, she picks up Yoshimi's gun and shoots him through the head. Afterward, Yoshimi is then killed when Mitsuko shoots her in the eye. In the novel she attempts to stop Mitsuko from removing her scythe from Yoji's head and attacks her before she is in turn shot by Mitsuko. Her manga profile states she had potential for a "dark horse" win.

In the film version, Yoshimi and Yoji hang themselves rather than participate in the Program.

Masayuki Taguchi, creator of the manga version, did not model his version of Yoshimi after any particular person. Taguchi said that he listened to many women and felt that they had a "unique outlook on life." Koushun Takami, author of the original Battle Royale novel, liked how Taguchi expanded Yoshimi's backstory. Takami described the manga version of the meeting between Yoshimi and Yoji as "standing strongly on its own."

Kills: herself (film)

Killed by: Mitsuko Souma (novel and manga); herself (film)

== Other characters ==
=== Kinpatsu Sakamochi ===
In the novel version Kinpatsu Sakamochi (坂持 金発, Sakamochi Kinpatsu) is a government employee who is the administrator of the current Battle Royale program. Sakamochi briefs the students on the rules of the Program. He is a vile and sadistic man, as he kills two students for misbehavior. In the end, he was killed by Shogo Kawada. His name is a play on the character Kinpachi Sakamoto (坂本 金八 Sakamoto Kinpachi) from the Japanese TV drama San nen B-gumi Kinpachi-sensei.

=== Kitano ===
In the film version, Kitano (キタノ) is the head instructor of the program. He is less sadistic than Sakamochi and Kamon.

He leaves his initial job at Shiroiwa Junior High School after Yoshitoki stabs him. Kitano returns as the instructor of the Battle Royale program and kills both Fumiyo and Yoshitoki.

Kitano seems to have some sort of affection for Noriko, whom he considers a respectful student much unlike the rest of her class. At one point in the movie, he saves her life from Mitsuko Souma by scaring Mitsuko. Afterwards, he then gives her his umbrella telling her "not to catch a cold". After Shogo Kawada is declared the winner, Kitano orders the military to leave the island and to not bother to check for the bodies of Shuya Nanahara and Noriko. When Shogo arrives to meet Kitano, Kitano reveals that he knew Shogo had deactivated Shuya's and Noriko's collars and then threatens to kill him. Shuya and Noriko both burst into the classroom in time. Kitano then reveals a painting he had created with all the other students dead, and Noriko triumphant. He tells her that he wishes to die, and he would prefer to die with her. He then threatens the trio with a gun once more and orders them to shoot him, or he would shoot them. Shuya promptly shoots him with a machine gun; Kitano rises and fires his gun (which turns out to be a harmless water gun). Shocked by the fake gun, Shuya accidentally lets loose another volley and Kitano falls down. Kitano rises again once more to answer his cell phone. After hanging up angrily on his daughter, tossing the phone to the floor, shooting it with a real gun and then eating the last of Noriko's cookies (complimenting the cookies while doing so) Kitano dies.

In the film adaptations, Kitano is portrayed by Takeshi Kitano.

=== Yonemi Kamon ===
In the manga version, Yonemi Kamon (嘉門 米美, Kamon Yonemi) is a government employee who is the administrator of the current Battle Royale program. Kamon briefs the students on the rules of Battle Royale. He is a vile and sadistic man, as he kills two students for misbehaving, and then orders the rest of the class to write lines, each stating that they will kill a certain student's name, all the while making cruel and sick jokes. He is also overtly lecherous. He also claims to have killed parents who objected to their children's placement in the program, as well as having raped Yoshitoki's guardian. Kamon himself bet 20,000 yen on Kazuo Kiriyama as the winner. When Yonemi tries to kill the winner, Shogo, for breaking the rules and saving Shuya and Noriko, Shogo stabs Yonemi in the neck with a pencil, killing him.

=== Keiko Onuki ===
Keiko Onuki (大貫 慶子, Ōnuki Keiko) is Shogo Kawada's girlfriend from his previous school in Kobe; Keiko was in Shogo's class when the two were in a Battle Royale.

In the novel, Shogo loses track of Keiko; Shogo believes that Keiko felt afraid of him. Shogo later discovered Keiko dead. In the manga, Shogo and Keiko meet. When Keiko seemingly points her gun towards Shogo, Shogo kills her; he later discovered that Keiko had aimed at a person behind him. In the film, Shogo and Keiko are the last two in the game. The injured players notice that their collars are about to explode. Keiko shoots Shogo to entice him to shoot her fatally; before Keiko dies she smiles and says arigatou (Thank you). Shogo, the survivor of that game, wonders why Keiko smiled at that point.

In the novel and manga versions of Battle Royale Shogo carries a bird call Keiko had given him, and uses it as a signal should any of the main group get lost or, in the case of Sugimura, succeed in finding Kayoko let them know he found her. This is later exploited by Kazuo Kiriyama after Sugimura and Kayoko are killed. Shogo also carries a photo of him and Keiko in all versions.

=== Ryoko Anno ===
Ryoko Anno (安野 良子, Anno Ryōko) is the superintendent of the Charity House, a Catholic orphanage. She acts as guardian to Yoshitoki and Shuya. In the manga and novel, the teacher (Sakamochi in the novel, Yonemi in the manga) says that he raped her when she objected to her charges being selected for the program. Yoshitoki becomes enraged upon hearing this and charges at Sakamochi/Kamon before he is gunned down and killed.

In the last volume of the manga, Shuya revisits the orphanage in secret without Ryoko knowing he is still alive. There he sees that she has formed a romantic relationship with a man. He tells himself he is pleased for her, before leaving on a ship to America.

Ryoko Anno is not mentioned in the film version.

=== Masao Hayashida ===
Masao Hayashida (林田 昌朗, Hayashida Masao) is the teacher of Class 3-B at Shiroiwa Junior High School. He is executed when he pleads for the lives of the 3-B students and his corpse is left to decay for a while before being shown to his former class by their new "teacher" who tells them that this is the fate that befalls those who would defy the Program. He is nicknamed "Dragonfly" because of his glasses.

=== Tahara, Nomura, and Kondo ===
Privates Tokihiko Tahara (田原 時彦, Tahara Tokihiko), Nomura (野村), and Kondo (近藤, Kondō) are, in the novel version, soldiers enforcing the Program. Tahara, described as "the frivolous one," shoots Noriko in the leg. The soldiers are killed by Shuya and Shogo in the end. They are named after characters in Kinpachi Sensei.

=== Kenichiro Sakaguchi ===
Kenichiro Sakaguchi (坂口 健一郎, Sakaguchi Ken'ichirō) was the gym teacher of Shiroiwa Junior High School, and he only appeared in the manga adaptation. He was formerly an Olympic judo participant, and has high skills in the martial arts, calling himself the "Jaguar" in arrogance. This arrogance, along with his abusive methods of "teaching" his students, made him highly despised by everyone in school. In the English translation, Sugimura had trouble remembering his name due to his dislike for the teacher. Sakaguchi would brutally beat up Sugimura in a judo match, despite knowing that Sugimura refused to fight back in pride, instead making it look like his student was weak. Sakaguchi then got humiliated by Mimura when the latter took his belt and dropped his pants, making him a laughing stock. Then Sakaguchi would suddenly pick on Kiriyama for reading a book about judo in class; Sakaguchi got defeated in the first round and was humiliated again, so he hit Kiriyama hard in the face in round two. This turned out to be a mistake, as Kiriyama used the third round to pop out Sakaguchi's right eyeball out of its socket. Sakaguchi screamed in pain and begged for mercy and help, but was ignored as Kiriyama crushed the eye while it was still connected via the retina, while everyone else refusing to help due to hating Sakaguchi and fearing Kiriyama. Horrified and traumatized by this torture, Sakaguchi resigned immediately, and Kazuo Kiriyama became infamous from that point on.

In the manga, Sakaguchi challenges Sugimura because of his dislike for Chinese martial arts. But because it is a judo match, Sugimura cannot strike; therefore Sakaguchi won throwing him to the floor in brutal fashion.

=== Mai ===
In the film version Mai (FR) is the smiling girl who survived the previous program. She appears in the sequel, Battle Royale II.

=== Kazumi Shintani ===
Kazumi Shintani (新谷 和美, Shintani Kazumi), a tall, plump girl in his music club.

== Battle Royale II primary characters ==
=== Takuma Aoi ===
Boy #1 in Battle Royale II, Takuma Aoi (青井 拓馬, Aoi Takuma) (nicknamed Taku (タク)) is a delinquent from Shikanotoride Middle School. He, along with his entire class, gets chosen to participate in the revised Battle Royale system, wherein a class would have to charge into a terrorist base under orders to kill the leader of said terrorists.

As each and every one of his friends gradually die during the game, Taku begins to show a much more brutal, cold side, and, eventually, he confronts the terrorist his entire class was sent to kill: Shuya Nanahara, who disarms them and attempts to persuade them to join his cause. Taku initially shrugs off any of Shuya's persuasions, but, in the end, realizes that Shuya, like him, is fighting merely to honor his dead friends.

Taku finally allies himself with Shuya by the end, and, as Japanese/US soldiers raid the island, they evacuate their allies off the island. In a final ditch effort, Taku and Shuya charge as the island is bombarded by missiles. Luckily, Shuya and Taku survive, and reunite with their allies in Afghanistan, and go their separate ways.

Takuma is portrayed by Shugo Oshinari.

=== Shiori Kitano ===
Shiori Kitano (キタノシオリ, Kitano Shiori), Girl #4, is the daughter of Kitano. Upon learning of her father's death, she goes on a quest for vengeance, signing up for the revised Battle Royale Act, in order to finally slay her father's killer, terrorist Shuya Nanahara.

Eventually, she, like Aoi, allies herself with Shuya when she finally realizes the meaning behind her father's last words to her ("If you hate someone, be prepared for the consequences").

She is killed by soldiers (and the then followed gunwounds), but before she dies, she laments on how she never recognized Kitano as her father.

Shiori is portrayed by Ai Maeda.

Killed by: Random Japan/US-Soldier, Nature

=== Nao Asakura ===
Nao Asakura (淺倉 なお Asakura Nao) Girl #1; teamed with Taku. She was the co-manager of the rugby team (along with Motomura) and loves Aoi. She managed to survive until the very end.

=== Kyoko Kakei ===
Kyoko Kakei (筧 今日子 Kakei Kyōko) Girl #3; teamed with Osamu. She was belonged to the tennis club. She has a strong and cool personality and makes fun of the boys since her three brothers are smart. She survives until the very end and takes then care of a baby from one of the Wild-Seven Members. She is in love with Aoi.

=== Mayu Hasuda ===
Mayu Hasuda (蓮田 麻由 Hasuda Mayu) Girl #13; teamed with Yasuaki. She is one of the class representatives. She is very healthy, athletic, and bright. She managed to survive until the very end.

=== Risa Shindo ===
Risa Shindo (新藤 理沙 Shindō Risa) Girl #8; teamed with Naoki. She is the class president who has high grades and a strong reputation. She was best friends with Honami Totsuka since elementary school. She managed to survive until the very end.

=== Haruya Sakurai ===
Haruya Sakurai (桜井 晴哉 Sakurai Haruya) Boy #5; teamed with Haruka Kuze and is the brother of Wild-Seven member Saki. He managed to survive until the very end.

=== Osamu Kasai ===
Osamu Kasai (葛西 治虫 Kasai Osamu) Boy #3; teamed with Kyoko Kakei. He's a shy student who's very secretly in love with his teammate (incidentally). Eventually he could be considered the "nerd" of the class, hence the shyness (with girls) and that he wears glasses.

Finally, at the end of the movie, where the surviving students and Wild Seven-Members escape through the tunnel, he confesses his love towards Kyoko, who doesn't really reciprocate.

Killed by: Grenade-explosion, which he self triggered, together with a Wild Seven-Member, in order to destroy the main part of the headquarters to stop the moving up soldiers (in the end)

=== Shintaro Makimura ===
Shintaro Makimura (槇村 慎太郎 Makimura Shintarō) Boy #15; teamed with Kazumi Fukuda. One of the students who dies before the game even starts, together with Kazumi, hence they're in a team. He's one of the best (or at least a very good) friend with Taku, who had tried to save him by ordering him "to cross the line".

Killed by: "Military Thug of Takeuchi"

=== Ryo Kurosawa ===
Ryo Kurosawa (黒澤 凌 Kurosawa Ryō) Boy #4; teamed with Shiori. The Rebel-Leader of Shikanotoride Middle School. He has invaded the headquarters of the Wild Seven, but once they're in, he gets mad and start shooting around, ended up shot in the head by Saki.

Killed by: Saki

=== Haruka Kuze ===
Haruka Kuze (久瀬 遥 Kuze Haruka) Girl #5; teamed with Haruya. She was suffered from congenital diabetes and she is secretly in love with Taku, which she reveals to him later in the film, right before her death.

Killed by: The missiles from the government (was hit by the collapsed ceiling)

=== Supporting characters ===
Male students

==== Shûgo Urabe ====
Shûgo Urabe (卜部 秀悟 Urabe Shūgo) Boy #2; teamed with Miki Ikeda. One of the best friends of Taku. After Miki get killed by her collar (because of panicking) he wanted to solo-battle the Wild Seven, but just after a few shots he received a headshot.

Killed by: Random Wild Seven-Member (Saki?)

==== Masami Shibaki ====
Masami Shibaki (柴木 雅美 Shibaki Masami) Boy #6; teamed with Nozomi Sagisawa. He was a transfer student from Kansai and belongs to the rugby club. He managed to survive 'till the [[EMP]] was activated and the collars were since then turned off. But when the Japanese/American Army attacked, he get shot by several soldiers and died from the gunwounds on a metal-stair in the headquarters.

Killed by: Random Japan/US-Soldier

==== Tetsuya Shimura ====
Tetsuya Shimura (志村 鉄也 Shimura Tetsuya) Boy #7; teamed with Sanae Shioda. He lost his father in terrorism and hangs out with the members of Schwartz Katze. He is a fan of military stuff. Died in order to rescue his teammate, who lost her mind and tried to escape from the island.

Killed by: A grenade fired from a Wild Seven-Member

==== Naoki Jô ====
Naoki Jô (城 直輝 Jô Naoki) Boy #8; teamed with Risa Shindô. He was belonged to the baseball club until his mother died in terrorism. He was the second-in-command of Schwartz Katze. He has invaded the headquarters with the others, but then died in a "shooting spree" with the Wild Seven Members.

Killed by: Random Wild Seven-Member

==== Masakatsu Taguchi ====
Masakatsu Taguchi (田口 正勝 Taguchi Masakatsu) Boy #9; teamed with Honami Totsuka. He was a huge fan of baseball and friends with Rena Niimi. Somehow(?) he ran into a landmine and ended up hanging legless off a timber from a ruin. There he died, too, and triggered the alarm of Honami's collar. After both died, his dead body fell from the timber and triggered a chain reaction of landmines connected by strings, so all other had to flee.

Killed by: Landmine(?) followed shortly after bleeding to death

==== Jun Nanami ====
Jun Nanami (名波 順 Nanami Jun) Boy #10; teamed with Yûko Natsukawa. His older brother died in terrorist attacks. He hangs out with the members of Schwartz Katze and a boy who loves old rock. He has invaded the headquarters with the others, but then died in a "shooting spree" with the Wild Seven Members.

Killed by: Random Wild Seven-Member

==== Tatsuhiko Hasegawa ====
Tatsuhiko Hasegawa (長谷川 達彦 Hasegawa Tatsuhiko) Boy #11; teamed with Rena Nîmi. He was a local boy who is an ace striker in the soccer club and was popular with junior girls. He was (accidentally) hit by a landmine-explosion, after Masakatsu's dead body triggered a chainreaction.

Killed by: Landmine-Chain

==== Shôta Hikasa ====
Shôta Hikasa (日笠 将太 Hikasa Shôta) Boy #12; teamed with Maho Nosaka. He was a local boy who kept to himself and had found it hard to make friends but luckily, he was friends with Yosuke Miyadai (his only friend). During the program, he has invaded with the others the headquarters, but then died in a "shooting spree" with the Wild Seven Members.

Killed by: Random Wild Seven-Member

==== Yasuaki Hosaka ====
Yasuaki Hosaka (保坂 康昭 Hosaka Yasuaki) Boy #13; teamed with Mayu Hasuda. He is a weakling and introvert who associates with Maho Nosaka. He wants to be a doctor in the future. He has invaded with the others the headquarters, but then died in a "shooting spree" with the Wild Seven Members.

Killed by: Random Wild Seven-Member

==== Kenji Maezono ====
Kenji Maezono (前薗健二 Maezono Kenji) Boy #14; teamed with Ryôko Hata. He was a jock whose father died in terrorism and hangs out with the members of Schwartz Katze. He was (accidentally) hit by a Landmine-explosion, too, after Masakatsu's dead body triggered a chainreaction.

Killed by: Landmine-Chain

==== Kiyoshi Minamoto ====
Kiyoshi Minamoto (皆本 清 Minamoto Kiyoshi) Boy #16; teamed with Shiho Matsuki. He was a local boy who was good at his athletic ability but, doesn't do well in academics. Also dies after the game-start, when he overreacts to the shooting of the Wild Seven and jumps off the boat, getting away from his partner and thus, leading his collar to explode.

Killed by: Collar explosion.

==== Yôsuke Miyadai ====
Yôsuke Miyadai (宮台 陽介 Miyadai Yôsuke) Boy #17; teamed with Yôka Mifune. He was a local boy who belongs to the baseball team but, dropped out. He's currently a ghost member due to his tired personality and friends with Shota Hikasa. Also, he likes Mayu Hasuda. He's the first victim after the game-start, before everyone reach the island.

Killed by: Random Wild Seven-Member (Saki?)

==== Wataru Mukai ====
Wataru Mukai (向井 渉 Mukai Wataru) Boy #18; teamed with Asuka Motomura. He also was part of the rugby team, and dies when Mifune's collar explodes, blowing up the boat where they all were.

Killed by: Boat explosion (caused by Mifune's collar detonation).

==== Tatsurô Morishima ====
Tatsurô Morishima (森島 達郎 Murishima Tatsurô) Boy #19; teamed with Ayane Yagi. He was a local boy who is the son of Komyoji Temple. He is kind to the girls but, he doesn't seem to be interested in women. He's the 4th boy to die in the game.

Killed by: Random Wild Seven-Member (Saki?)

Female students

==== Miki Ikeda ====
Miki Ikeda (池田 美希 Ikeda Miki) Girl #2; teamed with Shûgo. A small girl who is very timid and frightful of participating in the game. She is constantly being comforted by her friends and classmates. After arriving on the island, and after the ammunition was dropped, she ran into a forbidden zone and peed herself in fear. Though her classmates encouraged her to escape the zone, she fearfully ran off into the fields and her collar detonated.

Killed by: the detonation of her collar

==== Nozomi Sagisawa ====
Nozomi Sagisawa (鷺沢 希 Sagisawa Nozomi) Girl #6; teamed with Masami. She's been afraid of death since her father died in an accident in front of her when she was three. She belonged to the tennis club. She managed to survive until the [[EMP]] was activated and the collars were turned off. Prior to this, during the assault of the Wild Seven stronghold, Sagisawa is accidentally shot by Takuma. She succumbs to the injury and dies encouraging her friends to survive.

Killed by: Gunwounds, Nature

==== Sanae Shioda ====
Sanae Shioda (汐田 早苗 Shioda Sanae) Girl #7; teamed with Tetsuya. She was abused when she was little. She belonged to the track and field club and she has a boyfriend whose younger than her. After entering the island, she lost her mind under the never-ending fire from the Wild Seven-Members and wanted "to get home". In that attempt, to put the boat back in the ocean her teammate Tetsuya tried to bring her back, but was hit by a grenade and was, in the end, shot. The Death by "collar-detonation" was averted by a Wild Seven-Member, who shot Sanae before the collar could explode.

Killed by: Random Wild Seven-Member (Saki?)

==== Honami Totsuka ====
Honami Totsuka (戸塚 保奈美 Totsuka Honami) Girl #9; teamed with Masakatsu. She belonged to the tennis club and she is the captain. Best friends with Risa Shindo. After Masakatsu died on "his timber", her alarm set off and she died shortly afterwards, spraying all surrounding with blood.

Killed by: the detonation of her collar

==== Yûko Natsukawa ====
Yûko Natsukawa (夏川 結子 Natsukawa Yūko) Girl #10; teamed with Jun. She was a local girl who is the daughter of the restaurant owner. She's also the manager of the soccer club. After Jun gets shot in the "shooting spree" that happened in the headquarters-hall, her collar (and almost all collars of the others, too) set off, but although Shuya ordered then to activate the [[EMP]], it came too late, and her collar went off, killing her.

Killed by: the detonation of her collar

==== Rena Niimi ====
Rena Niimi (新見 麗奈 Niimi Rena) Girl #11; teamed with Tatsuhiko. She was harassed at her old school due to her anime voice and being dumb. Friends with Miki Ikeda and Ryoko Hata. She was hit by that landmine-chain.

Killed by: Landmine-Chain

==== Maho Nosaka ====
Maho Nosaka (野坂 真帆 Nosaka Maho) Girl #12; teamed with Shôta. She was learned aikido since elementary school. She was stubborn and temperamental and hangs out with Yasuaki Hosaka. After invaded the headquarters of the Wild Seven she gets really mad, tried to bring forth Shuya Nanahara in an attempt to kill him and (finally) end the game. But the others tried to moderate her and, in the end, she starts a "shooting spree" against every Wild Seven-Member there and then, gets shot.

Killed by: Random Wild Seven-Member

==== Ryôko Hata ====
Ryôko Hata (波多 量子 Hata Ryôko) Girl #14; teamed with Kenji. She is an introvert who immerses herself in fantasy. She wants to be a writer in the future. She was hit by that landmine-chain.

Killed by: Landmine-Chain

==== Kazumi Fukuda ====
Kazumi Fukuda (福田 和美 Fukuda Kazumi) Girl #15; teamed with Shintarô. In some way, the female "Rebel-Leader" of Shikanotoride. Together with her teammate she also gets killed before the game even starts.

Killed by: the detonation of her collar after the shooting of Shintarô.

==== Shiho Matsuki ====
Shiho Matsuki (松木 志穂 Matsuki Shiho) Girl #16; teamed with Kiyoshi Minamoto. She is an honor student who despises the delinquents. She has a good terms too with Hibiki Yano. Her partner, Kiyoshi who jumps off the boat out of panic and dies by collar detonation (due to the partner's distance rule); before Shiho's collar start to beep, she's killed when Mifune's collar explosion blows up their boat.

Killed by: Boat explosion (caused by Mifune's collar detonation).

==== Yûka Mifune ====
Yûka Mifune (三船 夕佳 Mifune Yūka) Girl #17; teamed with Yôsuke. A kleptomaniac who tried to gain her mother's attention, and was in change transferred to Shikanotoride, Mifune hangs out with Kazumi and Ai as part of the delinquent girls, but doesn't feel a particular friendship towards them. She was killed after her collar detonates (due to her partner's death), causing the boat she was in to explode, and killing everybody else aboard.

Killed by: Collar explosion (due to Yosuke's death).

==== Asuka Motomura ====
Asuka Motomura (本村 明日香 Motomura Asuka) Girl #18; teamed with Wataru. She was the rugby team co-manager, Nao's best friend and Shintaro's girlfriend. She was shot in the eyes during the boat landing; blind, calling Nao for help, she is killed when Mifune's collar detonation blows up their boat.

Killed by: Boat explosion (caused by Mifune's collar detonation).

==== Ayane Yagi ====
Ayane Yagi (八木 綾音 Yagi Ayane) Girl #19; teamed with Tatsurô. In the past, she was sexually assaulted by her elementary school teacher; she was a member of the basketball team, and was friends with Kana Yuki. During the boat landing, Ayane was shot by the Wild Seven-Sniper, and ultimately killed when the boat she was aboard explodes.

Killed by: Boat explosion (caused by random Wild Seven-Member (Saki?))

==== Ai Yazawa ====
Ai Yazawa (矢沢 愛 Yazawa Ai) Girl #20; teamed with Hibiki Yano. She was Kazumi's second in command among the delinquent girls. Ai was killed when her boat is blown up by a random Wild Seven Sniper.

Killed by: Boat explosion (caused by random Wild Seven Sniper (Saki?))

==== Hibiki Yano ====
Hibiki Yano (谷野 響 Yano Hibiki) Girl #21; teamed with Ai. Abused as a child, Hibiki grew timid, weak and panicked easily (as she was shown screaming during the landing scene, with her classmates trying to calm her down); she was friends with Eri Yoshiyama, and both of them died when a random Wild Seven Sniper blows up their boat.

Killed by: Boat explosion (caused by random Wild Seven Sniper (Saki?))

==== Kana Yûki ====
Kana Yûki (夕城 香菜 Yūki Kana) Girl #22; teamed with Eri Yoshiyama. Grown by her grandfather in a farm, thus she was an animal lover. Kana was a member of the basketball team and friends with Ayane Yagi, but for some reason, she regrets being in Shikanotoride. She was killed during the landing mission, when a random Wild Seven Sniper blows up her boat.

Killed by: Boat explosion (caused by random Wild Seven-Member (Saki?))

==== Eri Yoshiyama ====
Eri Yoshiyama (善山 絵里 Yoshiyama Eri) Girl #23; teamed with Kana. Member of the volleyball team, friends with Hibiki Yano. She used to be an honor student and a bully, until the girl she bullied committed suicide; that's why she's always protecting Hibiki. Eri was killed when a random Wild Seven Sniper blows up her boat.

Killed by: Boat explosion (caused by random Wild Seven-Member (Saki?))
