= List of Japanese films of 2000 =

== Highest-grossing films ==
Rank	Title	Gross
1	Pokémon 3: The Movie	¥4.85 billion
2	Whiteout	¥4.20 billion
3	Doraemon: Nobita and the Legend of the Sun King	¥3.05 billion

== List of films ==
A list of films released in Japan in 2000 (see 2000 in film).

Title	Director	Cast	Genre	Notes
Battle Royale	Kinji Fukasaku	Tatsuya Fujiwara	Thriller	
Brother	Takeshi Kitano	Beat Takeshi, Omar Epps, Claude Maki	Crime	
Cardcaptor Sakura Movie 2: The Sealed Card	Morio Asaka		Animation	
Case Closed: Captured in Her Eyes	Kanetsugu Kodama		Animation	
Chaos	Hideo Nakata	Miki Nakatani, Masato Hagiwara, Ken Mitsuishi	Mystery-thriller	
Crayon Shin-chan: The Storm Called The Jungle	Keiichi Hara		Animated	
Dead or Alive 2: Birds	Takashi Miike	Show Aikawa, Riki Takeuchi	Crime	
Doki Doki Wildcat Engine	Hiroshi Nishikiori		Animated	
Dora-Heita	Kon Ichikawa	Kōji Yakusho, Yuko Asano, Bunta Sugawara	Comedy	
Doraemon: A Grandmother's Recollections	Ayumu Watanabe		Animated	
Doraemon: Nobita and the Legend of the Sun King	Tsutomu Shibayama		Anime	
Escaflowne	Kazuki Akane	Maaya Yamaguchi, Tomokazu Seki	Anime	
Eureka	Shinji Aoyama	Kōji Yakusho, Ken Mitsuishi, Yutaka Matsushige	Drama	
Godzilla vs. Megaguirus	Masaki Tezuka	Misato Tanaka, Shosuke Tanihara, Masato Ibu	Science fiction, action	
Gojoe	Gakuryu Ishii	Tadanobu Asano, Masatoshi Nagase	Action	
GTO: The Movie				
The Guys from Paradise	Takashi Miike	Kōji Kikkawa, Nene Otsuka, Kenichi Endō, Tsutomu Yamazaki	Crime	Japanese-Filipino co-production
Isn't She Great	Andrew Bergman	Bette Midler, Nathan Lane, David Hyde Pierce		American-British-German-Japanese co-production
Isola	Toshiyuki Mizutani	Yoshino Kimura, Yu Kurosawa, Ken Ishiguro	Horror	
Ju-on	Takashi Shimizu	Yurei Yanagi, Chiaki Kuriyama, Takako Fuji	Horror	Direct-to-video release.
Ju-on 2	Takashi Shimizu	Yuuko Daike, Makoto Ashikawa, Kahori Fuji	Horror	Direct-to-video release
Juvenile	Takashi Yamazaki			
Keizoku: Unsolved Mysteries - Beautiful Dreamer	Yukihiko Tsutsumi	Kiyoshi Nakajo, Atsuro Watanabe, Nanako Okochi		
GoGoV: Sudden Shock! A New Warrior!				
GoGoV vs. Gingaman				
Like a Flowing River	Yasushi Akimoto	Mitsuko Mori, Kunie Tanaka, Yoshiko Kuga		
Mononoke hime in U.S.A.	Toshikazu Sato	Hayao Miyazaki	Documentary	
Nagai Yume	Higuchinsky	Shuuji Kashiwabara, Masami Horiuchi, Eriko Hatsune	Horror	Television film
Off-Balance	Shin Togashi			
One Piece: The Movie		Mayumi Tanaka, Kazuya Nakai, Akemi Okamura, Kappei Yamaguchi	Animation	First One Piece movie.
Pikachu & Pichu	Kunihiko Yuyama		Animated	
Pokémon 3: The Movie	Kunihiko Yuyama		Anime	
Pyrokinesis	Shusuke Kaneko	Akiko Yada, Hideaki Itō, Ryuji Harada	Horror	
Ring 0: Birthday	Tsuruta Norio	Yukie Nakama, Seiichi Tanabe, Yoshiko Tanaka	Horror	
Sad and Painful Search: Office Lady Essay	Tarō Araki	Emi Kawana, Yumi Yoshiyuki	Pink	Best Film, Pink Grand Prix
Senrigan	Manabu Iso	Miki Mizuno, Hitomi Kuroki, Toshirou Yanagiba		
Sunday's Dream	Yōichirō Takahashi			Screened at the 2000 Cannes Film Festival
Titan A.E.	Don Bluth, Gary Goldman	Matt Damon, Bill Pullman, John Leguizamo, Nathan Lane, Janeane Garofalo, Drew Barrymore	Animated science fiction action-adventure	
Tomie: Replay	Tomijiro Mitsuishi	Mai Hosho, Sayaka Yamaguchi, Yosuke Kubozukai	Horror	
Uzumaki	Higuchinsky	Eriko Hatsune, Fhi Fan, Hinako Saeki	Horror	
Versus	Ryuhei Kitamura	Tak Sakaguchi, Hideo Sakaki	Action, horror	

== See also ==
- 2000 in Japan
- 2000 in Japanese television

== Footnotes ==
=== References ===
- Galbraith IV, Stuart (2008). The Toho Studios Story: A History and Complete Filmography. Scarecrow Press. ISBN 978-1461673743.
- Kalat, David (2007). J-horror: The Definitive Guide to The Ring, The Grudge and Beyond. Vertical. ISBN 978-1932234084.
