= SF series =

The SF series is a feature and short films concept by Japanese director Hiroyuki Nakano.

== Episodes ==
- 1998.08: SF・サムライ・フィクション, feature film (a.k.a. Samurai Fiction, a.k.a. SF: episode 1)
- 2001.06: SF・Stereo Future, feature film (a.k.a. Stereo Future)
- 2002.XX: SF・Sweet Female, short film
- 2003.03: SF・Sonic Four, short film
- 2003.03: SF・Short Films, short films compilation
- 2003.06: SF Short Films 2 Round:2 Splash Dance, short film (a.k.a. Splash Dance)

== Trivia ==
French and German subtitled versions of the first SF episode (Samurai Fiction) were broadcast in Europe on July 20, 2000, on the French-German public channel Arte ¹. The movie was broadcast a second time circa 2005.
