= All Time Super Best =

Compilation album by Tomoyasu Hotei
- Released: December 7, 2005
- Studio: IRc2 Studio (Tokyo); Angel Studio (London)
- Genre: Rock
- Length: 71:32
- Label: EMI
- Producer: Tomoyasu Hotei

Tomoyasu Hotei chronology
Monster Drive (2005)	All Time Super Best (2005)	Soul Sessions (2006)

All Time Super Best is a compilation album by Tomoyasu Hotei.

It commemorates the 25th anniversary of his first performance on stage as Boøwy in 1981. Therefore, it features work from his entire career, spanning three decades. His solo work, such as Russian Roulette is accompanied with tracks such as Be My Baby and Bad Feeling, which were hits with his bands Complex and Boøwy respectively. It also includes yet another version of his now internationally prolific Battle Without Honor or Humanity.

All music is composed by Tomoyasu Hotei.

No.	Title	Lyrics	Length
1.	"Bad Feeling (25 Years Anniversary Version)"	Kyosuke Himuro, Makoto Takahashi	4:59
2.	"Be My Baby (25 Years Anniversary Version)"	Kōji Kikkawa	4:52
3.	"Saraba Seishun no Hikari (Unplugged Version)"	Tomoyasu Hotei	4:54
4.	"Thrill (Punky Version)"	Yukinojo Mori	4:58
5.	"Beat Sweet (25 Years Anniversary Version)"	Kyosuke Himuro	4:30
6.	"Bambina (Bambina Go! Go! Version)"	Yukinojo Mori	4:42
7.	"Lonely Wild (Orchestral Version)"	Tomoyasu Hotei	6:41
8.	"Poison (Sexy Jazz Version)"	Yukinojo Mori	4:59
9.	"Song for Us (25 Years Anniversary New Song)"	Kō Machida	4:03
10.	"Battle Without Honor or Humanity (Samurai Mix)"	[Instrumental]	6:04
11.	"Russian Roulette"	Tomoyasu Hotei	4:02
12.	"Nocturne No. 9"	Tomoyasu Hotei	4:28
13.	"Destiny Rose"	Yukinojo Mori	4:08
14.	"Love Junkie"	Yukinojo Mori	4:03
15.	"Identity (New Mix)"	Tomoyasu Hotei	4:41
