= Uzumaki =

Japanese manga series by Junji Ito

- First tankōbon volume cover

うずまき
- Genre: Dark fantasy; Psychological horror; Supernatural
- Manga
- Written by: Junji Ito
- Published by: Shogakukan
- English publisher: NA: Viz Media
- Magazine: Big Comic Spirits
- English magazine: NA: Pulp
- Original run: January 19, 1998 – August 30, 1999
- Volumes: 3
- Anime television series
- Directed by: See episodes
- Produced by: Maki Terashima-Furuta; Haruyasu Makino
- Written by: Aki Itami
- Music by: Colin Stetson
- Studio: Fugaku (#1, 4); Akatsuki (#2–3)
- Licensed by: The Cartoon Network, Inc.; Netflix (streaming) (Note: Asian territories)
- English network: CA: Adult Swim; US: Adult Swim (Toonami)
- Original run: September 29, 2024 – October 20, 2024
- Episodes: 4
- Live-action film
- Uzumaki (2000)
- icon

Uzumaki (うずまき; lit. 'Spiral') is a Japanese manga series written and illustrated by Junji Ito. Debuting as a serial in Shogakukan's weekly seinen manga magazine Big Comic Spirits from 1998 to 1999, the chapters were compiled into three bound volumes published from August 1998 to September 1999. In March 2000, Shogakukan released an omnibus edition, followed by a second omnibus version in August 2010. In North America, Viz Media serialized an English-language translation of the series in its monthly magazine Pulp from February 2001 to August 2002. Viz Media then published the volumes from October 2001 to October 2002, with a re-release from October 2007 to February 2008, and published a hardcover omnibus edition in October 2013.

The series tells the story of the denizens of Kurouzu-chō (黒渦町), a fictional town plagued by a supernatural curse involving spirals. The story for Uzumaki originated when Ito attempted to write a story about people living in a very long terraced house, and he was inspired to use a spiral shape to achieve the desired length. Ito believes the horror of Uzumaki is effective due to its subversion of symbols that are typically portrayed positively in Japanese media, and its theme of protagonists struggling against a mysterious force stronger than themselves.

Uzumaki continues to receive critical acclaim, often regarded as Ito's magnum opus. The manga has received generally positive reviews from English-language critics. It was nominated for an Eisner Award in 2003, and placed in the Young Adult Library Services Association's list of the "Top 10 Graphic Novels for Teens" in 2009.

In 2000, the manga was adapted into two video games for the WonderSwan and a Japanese live-action film directed by Higuchinsky. An anime television miniseries adaptation co-produced by Production I.G USA and Adult Swim aired from September to October 2024 in the United States on Adult Swim's Toonami programming block.

== Plot ==
Uzumaki follows a high-school student, Kirie Goshima (五島桐絵); her boyfriend, Shuichi Saito (斎藤秀一); and the citizens of the small, quiet Japanese town of Kurouzu-cho (黒渦町, Black Vortex Town), which is enveloped by supernatural events involving spirals. As the story progresses, Kirie and Shuichi witness how the spiral curse affects the people around them, causing the citizens to become either obsessed with or paranoid about spirals, including transforming them into grotesque monsters such as contorting their bodies, making pregnant women act like mosquitoes, raising the dead, and mutating most of the citizens into snails. The curse also progressively affects Kurouzu's environment. Among other things, it causes smoke from cremations to form spirals in the sky, turns the abandoned lighthouse into a hot furnace while making whoever looks at it walk in circles, creates whirlwinds and whirlpools, and warps vegetation into spiral patterns.

Shuichi becomes reclusive after both of his parents die from the horrific psychological and physical powers of the spirals, but he also gains the ability to detect when the spiral curse is taking place, although he is often dismissed until the next paranormal effects of the curse become obvious. Eventually, Kirie is affected by the curse as well, when her hair begins to curl into an unnatural spiral pattern, drains her life energy to hypnotize the citizens, and chokes her whenever she attempts to cut it off. Shuichi can cut her hair and save her. As the community begins to break down, the curse continues to plague the town until a series of typhoons conjured by the curse destroys most of its structures. The only remaining buildings are ancient abandoned row houses, which the citizens are forced to move into.

The curse's power increases dramatically, resulting in loud sounds or sudden movements generating whirlwinds. Kirie and Shuichi gather everyone to devise a plan to escape Kurouzu, but when they attempt to escape, their efforts are unsuccessful. After returning to the town, they discover that several years have passed since they left, as time speeds up away from the spiral. The other citizens expanded the row houses until they connected into a single structure, forming a labyrinthine spiral pattern. Almost everyone in the town has been mutated by the curse due to them being forced into the overcrowded rowhouses, with their bodies twisting into spiral arrangements. Kirie and Shuichi decide to search for Kirie's parents, which brings them to the center after many days of walking through the labyrinth which leads them directly to Dragonfly Pond, which has drained to reveal a spiral staircase.

When they begin walking down the steps, Shuichi is hurled down into the pit by a mutated citizen, with Kirie descending the stairs to find him. She slips and falls, but survives after her fall is broken by a whirlwind, landing on countless bodies making up the ground of a vast, ancient city consisting entirely of spiral patterns in various arrangements. As Kirie looks for Shuichi, she finds her parents twisted and petrified, resembling stone statues, along with many other citizens of Kurouzu who have met the same fate. Then, she hears Shuichi call for her and goes to him. Both are overwhelmed by the ancient spirals surrounding them. Shuichi points out how it seems as though the strange assortment of structures has a will of its own. Noticing that the petrified citizens of Kurouzu are all facing the spiral city, Shuichi determines that this is the true source of the curse; the sentient city has periodically expanded on its own, and is cursing the land above.

Shuichi urges Kirie to leave without him as he can no longer walk and the curse should be over soon, but she replies that she does not have the strength and wishes to stay with him. The two embrace with their bodies twisting and intertwining together, signifying their acceptance of the never-ending curse. At the same time, a stone tower in the shape of a drill bit rises out of the city and breaches the surface, forming the centerpiece of the abandoned town. As Shuichi and Kirie lie together, Kirie notes that the curse ended at the same time it began, for just as time speeds up away from the center, it freezes at the center. The spiral's curse is eternal, and all the events will repeat when a new Kurouzu is built where the previous one lies.

== Characters ==
Kirie Goshima
Voiced by: Uki Satake (Japanese); Abby Trott (English)
Shuichi Saito
Voiced by: Shin-ichiro Miki (Japanese); Robbie Daymond (English)
Yasuo Goshima
Voiced by: Toshio Furukawa (Japanese); Doug Stone (English)
Chizuko Goshima
Voiced by: Shino Kakinuma (Japanese); Dorothy Elias-Fahn (English)
Mitsuo Goshima
Voiced by: Yuko Sanpei (Japanese); Laura Stahl (English)
Toshio Saito
Voiced by: Takashi Matsuyama (Japanese); Aaron LaPlante (English)
Yukie Saito
Voiced by: Mika Doi (Japanese); Mona Marshall (English)
Azami Kurotani
Voiced by: Mariya Ise (Japanese); Cristina Vee (English)
Tokuo Katayama
Voiced by: Katsutoshi Matsuzaki (Japanese); Max Mittelman (English)
Okada
Voiced by: Wataru Hatano (Japanese); Kaiji Tang (English)
Kazuki Tsumura
Voiced by: Tatsumaru Tachibana (Japanese); Sean Chiplock (English)
Ikuo Yokota
Voiced by: Kōichi Tōchika (Japanese); Jonah Scott (English)
Shiho Ishikawa
Voiced by: Ami Fukushima (Japanese); Erica Mendez (English)
Kazunori Nishiki
Voiced by: Yūto Uemura (Japanese); Khoi Dao (English)
Yoriko Endo
Voiced by: Satomi Hanamura (Japanese); Brianna Knickerbocker (English)
Mitsuru Yamaguchi
Voiced by: Kappei Yamaguchi (Japanese); Erik Scott Kimerer (English)
Kyoko Sekino
Voiced by: Yoko Hikasa (Japanese); Jenny Yokobori (English)
Keiko Nakayama
Voiced by: Shiori Koshikawa (Japanese); Amber Lee Connors (English)
Wakabayashi
Voiced by: Yūji Ueda (Japanese); Stephen Fu (English)
Pregnant Woman L
Voiced by: Sumi Shimamoto (Japanese); Larissa Gallagher (English)
Chie Maruyama
Voiced by: Ai Kobayashi (Japanese); Courtney Lin (English)
Tanizaki
Voiced by: Satoshi Mikami (Japanese); Patrick Seitz (English)
Butterfly Tribe Leader
Voiced by: Yuto Nakano (Japanese); Kirk Thornton (English)
Takemoto
Voiced by: Yukito Soma (Japanese); Brent Mukai (English)

== Development ==
Junji Ito's initial desire was to create a story about strange changes that would occur to people living in a very long, traditional Japanese terraced house. This story would have been based on Ito's personal experience living in such a house as a child. During the process of finding a way to draw such a long building, Ito was inspired by the shape of a mosquito coil and decided he could make the building long by having it spiral. Ito has noted that the spiral is a "mysterious pattern" and described writing Uzumaki as an attempt to learn the secrets of the spiral. Ito sought inspiration by methods such as staring at spirals, researching spirals, creating spiral patterns by draining water from bath tubs, eating foods with spiral patterns, and raising snails. Looking back on the series in 2006, Ito stated that while he was still uncertain what the spiral stood for, he thought it might be representative of infinity.

Uzumaki was influenced by the positive representation of spirals in media, which inspired Ito to subvert them to create horror, stating: "Usually spiral patterns mark character's cheeks in Japanese comedy cartoons, representing an effect of warmth. However, I thought it could be used in horror if I drew it a different way." The story in which Kirie's hair is cursed by the spiral reflects a recurring theme in Ito's work in which a heroine's hair has a life of its own. Ito uses this imagery because it lends itself well to horror due to its association with the Japanese feminine ideal (Yamato nadeshiko), as well as the unnerving flowing motions of long hair, which he describes as snakelike. Ito also noted that horror writer H. P. Lovecraft was one of his inspirations when creating Uzumaki, stating that the gradual development of the spiral curse was patterned on Lovecraft's storytelling and that "Lovecraft's expressionism with regard to atmosphere greatly inspires my creative impulse."

== Media ==
=== Manga ===
Written and illustrated by Junji Ito, Uzumaki was serialized in Shogakukan's seinen manga magazine Big Comic Spirits from January 19, 1998, to August 30, 1999. (Note: It finished in the magazine's 39th issue of 1999, released on August 30 of that same year) Shogakukan compiled the chapters into three bound volumes and published them from August 29, 1998, to September 30, 1999. To celebrate the release of the live-action film, the manga series was released in an omnibus volume in March 2000, with an additional "lost" chapter. Shogakukan released another omnibus edition on August 30, 2010, with the same content and additional commentary from Masaru Sato.

In North America, Viz Media serialized an English-language translation of the series in its monthly magazine Pulp from the February 2001 issue to the August 2002 issue. It published volumes of the series from October 2001 to October 2002. Viz Media re-released the series with new covers from October 2007 to February 2008, and published the omnibus volume in hardcover with twelve color pages on October 13, 2013. The series has also been translated into other languages, such as Spanish, French, Brazilian Portuguese, Polish, Swedish, Mandarin, Korean, and Serbian.

No.	Original release date	Original ISBN	English release date	English ISBN
1	August 29, 1998	4-09-185721-3	October 28, 2001 (1st ed.); October 16, 2007 (2nd ed.)	978-1-56-931714-3 (1st ed.); 1-4215-1389-7 (2nd ed.)
1. "The Spiral Obsession Part 1" (うずまきマニア: その1, Uzumaki Mania: So no Ichi); 2. "The Spiral Obsession Part 2" (うずまきマニア: その2, Uzumaki Mania: So no Ni); 3. "The Scar" (傷跡, Kizuato); 4. "The Firing Effect" (窯変, Yōhen); 5. "Twisted Souls" (ねじれた人びと, Nejireta Hitobito); 6. "Medusa" (巻髪, Maki Kami); Afterword
2	February 26, 1999	4-09-185722-1	July 28, 2002 (1st ed.); December 18, 2007 (2nd ed.)	978-1-59-116033-5 (1st ed.); 1-4215-1390-0 (2nd ed.)
7. "Jack-in-the-Box" (びっくり箱, Bikkuri-Bako); 8. "The Snail" (ヒトマイマイ, Hitomaimai); 9. "The Black Lighthouse" (黒い灯台, Kuroi Tōdai); 10. "Mosquitoes" (蚊柱, Kabashira); 11. "The Umbilical Cord" (臍帯, Saitai); 12. "The Storm" (台風1号, Taifū Ichi-gō); Afterword
3	September 30, 1999	4-09-185723-X	October 28, 2002 (1st ed.); February 19, 2008 (2nd ed.)	978-1-59-116048-9 (1st ed.); 1-4215-1391-9 (2nd ed.)
13. "The House" (鬼のいる長屋, Oni no Iru Nagaya); 14. "Butterflies" (蝶, Chō); 15. "Chaos" (混沌, Konton); 16. "Erosion" (続・混沌, Zoku・Konton); 17. "Escape" (脱出, Dasshutsu); 18. "The Labyrinth" (迷路, Meiro); 19. "Completion" (遺跡, Iseki); Lost chapter: "Galaxies" (銀河, Ginga) (Note: The chapter was not included in the original Japanese release but in the subsequent omnibus editions. It was included in the third volume in North America.); Afterword

=== Video games ===
Two video games were developed and published by Omega Micott for the Bandai WonderSwan. The first, Uzumaki: Denshi Kaiki Hen (うずまき 〜電視怪奇篇〜, Spiral – Television Mystery), was released on February 3, 2000, and is a visual novel retelling the events of the manga. Kirie Goshima's actor, Eriko Hatsune makes a special appearance. The second game, titled Uzumaki: Noroi Simulation (うずまき 〜呪いシミュレーション〜, Spiral – Curse Simulation), was released on March 4, 2000, and is a simulation game. Players are tasked by the Uzumaki Sennin (うずまき仙人; Spiral Master) to spread the spiral curse. The objective is to spread the curse across the town and find hidden objects to gain more "Spiral Power" and progress the story. The title also includes a mini-game involving one of the snail-human hybrids.

=== Live-action film ===
On February 11, 2000, a live-action adaptation of Uzumaki was released in Japan. Directed by Higuchinsky, it featured Eriko Hatsune as Kirie Goshima, Shin Eun-kyung as Chie Maruyama, Fhi Fan as Shuichi Saito, Keiko Takahashi as Yukie Saito, Ren Osugi as Toshio Saito, and Hinako Saeki as Kyoko Sekino. The film consists of four parts ("A Premonition", "Erosion", "Visitation", and "Transmigration"), and as a result of being produced before the manga's conclusion, uses a different ending than the manga.

=== Anime ===
At 2019's Crunchyroll Expo, a 4-episode anime television miniseries adaptation was announced. The miniseries is co-produced by Production I.G USA and Adult Swim's in-house production arm Williams Street. The anime is directed by Hiroshi Nagahama, with Colin Stetson composing the music. It premiered on Adult Swim's Toonami programming block before its Japanese premiere. This is the fourth time that Cartoon Network, as an entire network, was directly involved in the production of a Japanese anime, with The Big O II, IGPX (both the 2005 micro-series and 2006 anime), and the FLCL sequels, all receiving some form of animated production that was backed by the network. Creative director Jason DeMarco stated that as of March 25, 2020, production was still in progress, and that the COVID-19 pandemic had no effect on production. In an interview with Ito, he speaks of Hiroshi Nagahama in respect calling him "quite talented". He also said that being faithful to his original manga made him "quite happy". Ito confirmed that the screenplay of the series was finished since he checked. He said "Four episodes are way shorter than the original manga. They did a good job of rearranging the series. For example, someone who dies early on now plays an important role later on. They did a fantastic job of crafting things together like that. The screenwriter is a very talented individual." The anime is produced entirely in black and white.

On June 10, 2020, the anime's official Twitter account presented some pictures of storyboards. On July 22, 2020, the official Twitter announced the Japanese voice cast. On July 26, 2020, Adult Swim reran the same teaser trailer during its Adult Swim Con and presented an interview with series director Nagahama. In addition to this, it was confirmed that the series was being moved back a year from its originally planned 2020 release. On July 29, 2020, the Japanese voice cast officially started recording. A second teaser video was posted on June 15, 2021, with comments from director Hiroshi Nagahama describing how the pandemic forced the team to "restructure" their plan for the anime from scratch. The video also confirmed that the anime would be delayed again to October 2022.

In June 2022, Corus Entertainment confirmed through a press release that the series would also be broadcast on Adult Swim in Canada. Later that same month, the anime was once again delayed indefinitely at the request of the production staff. In 2023, Ari Aster and Lars Knudsen's company Square Peg was revealed to be involved with producing the series. On July 22, 2023, during Adult Swim's "Toonami on the Green" panel at San Diego Comic-Con, the network debuted a new clip from the series. Despite it not unveiling any release timeframe at the end, Jason DeMarco later stated on Twitter that the series would premiere later in 2023, although that did not happen. The series premiered in Japanese with English subtitles on September 29, 2024, and its English dub premiered on October 4 of the same year. Netflix announced on October 25, 2024, that the series is set to be streamed on the platform in Asia by the end of the year.

The series was originally announced as being animated by Drive by producer Maki-Terashima Furuta. In July 2023, some articles mentioned that it was being produced by both Drive and Akatsuki. However, when the series premiered in September 2024, Drive's name was not included in the credits. Animation production for the first episode was instead credited to planning and production company Fugaku. The second and third episodes were credited as being produced at Akatsuki; however, Nagahama was only credited for the storyboards, with Yuji Moriyama credited as director in his place. The fourth and final episode credits neither Nagahama nor Moriyama as director, and omits the title entirely.

No.	Title	Series director	Episode director (Note: This row is for "episode directors" (or processing directors) rather than the overall "series director" of an episode. According to Sohtome, the "assistant director" credit is being used as an equivalent to "episode director" in the first episode.)	Storyboarder	Original release date (Note: Adult Swim premiered the series in its original Japanese subbed format before the English dub)	English dub air date
1	"Episode 1"	Hiroshi Nagahama	Kouichirou Sohtome	Hiroshi Nagahama	September 29, 2024	October 4, 2024
Shuichi Saito tells his girlfriend Kirie Goshima that his father, Toshio, has become obsessed with spirals to the point of madness. Kirie sees for herself when she returns home and sees Toshio insanely demanding her potter father, Yasuo, make a spiral pattern pottery for him. Later at school, Kirie and classmate Azami Kurotami discuss Azami's crescent-shaped forehead scar, which seems to attract boys to her. After class, Kirie introduces Azami to Shuichi, but she startles Shuichi and he runs off with Kirie. Later, Kirie delivers her father's finished pottery to Toshio. But Toshio now claims he can become a spiral, and shows he can twist his tongue into a spiral, frightening Kirie away. Meanwhile, Azami runs into Shuichi and admits that she is now infatuated with him because, unlike other boys, he was repelled by her scar. Shuichi points out that her scar has now turned into a spiral, and warns her that the town is infecting her with a curse. Sometime later, Shuichi and his mother Yukie arrive home, only to discover that Toshio had contorted his entire body into a long spiral crammed inside a tub, killing himself in the process. Later, the smoke from Toshio's cremation forms a spiral and then an image of his face, driving Yukie so insane as to require hospitalization. Back at school, Kirie discovers a classmate, Tokuo Katayama, also has a large spiral pattern on his back. After school, she runs into Azami again and discovers that her spiral scar has grown into a vortex that has consumed half her head. Later, Azami tricks Okada, a classmate who has a crush on her, into bringing Shuichi to her. The vortex then grows uncontrollably, swallowing Okada whole, and then devouring the rest of Azami's body.
2	"Episode 2"	Yuji Moriyama	Taiki Nishimura	Hiroshi Nagahama	October 6, 2024	October 11, 2024
Katayama morphs into a giant snail with a spiral shell. His parents refuse to believe this has happened, and so Katayama has to live in a chicken coop at the school. A fellow student, Tsumura, also morphs into a giant snail. He mates with Katayama, and then they disappear, leaving a pile of eggs. The teacher, Mr. Yokota, destroys the eggs, but days later he himself turns into a giant snail. Elsewhere, fellow students Kazunori Nishiki and Yoriko Endo love each other even though their families are feuding. They secretly meet in an abandoned rowhouse, where they stumble upon two mating snakes who have twisted their bodies together. With help from Kirie and Shuichi, they ultimately decide to elope and try to flee the town, but their families corner them on the beach. Kazunori and Yoriko then decide to twist their own bodies together just like the snakes, and they crawl off into the ocean. During this time, Kirie's own hair comes to life and takes the form of large spirals. The spirals mesmerize everyone except Shuichi. They even inspire one student, the class clown Mitsuru Yamaguchi, to try to impress Kirie with a dangerous stunt that causes his death. Another student, Kyoko Sekino, grows so jealous of Kirie that her own hair comes to life, and the two girls' hair has a battle. During the battle, Shuichi can free Kirie by snipping off all her long hair. Later, the light from an abandoned lighthouse starts working again, causing some people to walk in spirals. Kirie's brother Mitsuo and some of his friends go explore the lighthouse. Kirie rushes inside to rescue them, only to find burnt bodies along the spiral staircase. She finds the boys at the top, where the Fresnel lens has warped into a spiral pattern. Then she realizes that the heat from the bright light was what burned the other people to death. Kirie, Mitsuo, and her friends desperately run down the stairway trying to escape the activating light. At the cemetery, the light makes Yamaguchi's body rise from his grave in a jump scare, just like his signature "jack in the box" prank.
3	"Episode 3"	Yuji Moriyama	Shigeki Awai	Hiroshi Nagahama	October 13, 2024	October 18, 2024
Kirie is admitted to the town's hospital for her burns. Also at the hospital, Toshio appears to Yukie in the form of a millipede, wanting to crawl into the spiral that is already in her ear, her cochlea. Repeated visits drive Yukie to fatally stab herself in the ear. At the same time, spiral-shaped swarms of mosquitoes have been biting women about to give birth, including Kirie's cousin Keiko. The following night, Kirie wakes up and discovers that the pregnant women are using manual hand drills to drain and suck the blood of patients. The women try to kill Kirie, but she uses Shuichi's mosquito repellent to disperse them. Sometime later, Kirie and Shuichi discover that the newborn babies can talk, all wanting to return to the womb. As an act of defiance, they regenerate their placenta from their umbilical cords, which take the form of mushrooms loaded with blood. The now deranged obstetrician has been feeding the mushrooms to patients, and has sewn Keiko's baby back into her womb. Keiko attacks the doctor and Kirie for their blood; she kills the doctor, but Kirie escapes. Soon after, Kirie leaves the hospital for home, only to discover that her father Yasuo has developed his own obsession with spirals. Yasuo repeatedly makes pottery filled with spirals and images of Shuichi's parents. Later, Shuichi hears the spirits of his parents calling out from Yasuo's kiln, and he destroys it. A typhoon descends upon the town, and Kirie hears it calling her name. Shuichi claims that the typhoon has fallen madly in love with Kirie. The typhoon ultimately sucks both of them up into its eye, depositing them on the shore of a pond before dispersing. Kirie's family takes refuge in one of the old roadhouses. A friend, Mr. Wakabayashi, informs the family that their neighbors are an old lady and her son, who suffers from a strange malady. Days later, the son dies. Kirie goes to investigate and finds her son covered with spiral-shaped spikes. Wakabayashi sneaks into the old room to spy on Kirie, but the spikes appear on him now. A crazed Wakabayashi covered in long spikes attacks Kirie, but is killed by flying debris from a second typhoon. In the end, Yamaguchi's corpse randomly appears, jumping thanks to the car suspension spring inside his torso.
4	"Episode 4"	N/A (Note: A series director was not credited for episode 4)	Wu Hao, Daisuke Sato, Kouichirou Sohtome, Shinrai & Studio Massket (Note: Three episode directors credited in the opening telop, five credited in the ending telop)	Hiroshi Nagahama	October 20, 2024	October 25, 2024
In the aftermath of the second typhoon, Kurouzu-cho is hit by four more typhoons. Chie Maruyama leads a news crew to investigate, but a whirlwind kills her crew. Kirie and Mitsuo spot her and explain that the slightest motion or sound now generates deadly whirlwinds. But moving slowly has also been causing people to morph into giant snails. They take Chie back to the rowhouse where their family has taken refuge, but the others kick her family and Shuichi out for bringing a new person in. The group then finds a gang cooking snail people for food. In a fight with the gang, Yasuo gets pushed and is swept up in a whirlwind. Kirie, Shuichi, and Chie leave Mitsuo with Chizuko to search for Yasuo. They meet a group that tells them all efforts to escape the town through the roads or by sea have failed. They journey to the rowhouses on the outskirts, only to find them so packed with people that their bodies have twisted into one big knot. These people now only care about expanding their rowhouses. They return to Mitsuo only to learn that another whirlwind swept Chizuko away. The whole group then makes a futile attempt to escape through the mountains. During that time, Mitsuo turns into a snail person. Kirie, Shuichi, and Chie help Mitsuo escape from being eaten. The trio returns to Kurouzu-cho and finds that many years have passed since they left. The rowhouses now form one giant spiral leading to Dragonfly Pond; Shuichi theorizes that this was the original design of the rowhouses. They rush to the Pond hoping to find Kirie's parents, but the people inside the rowhouses pull Chie in. When Shuichi and Kirie reach the pond, everybody else suddenly disappears. They find a descending stairwell in place of the pond and walk in. But a spiral-inflicted person pulls Shuichi off the stairs, and Kirie also falls off due to the stairs being broken. At the bottom, Kirie finds a giant temple made of spirals. The remains of all the people surround the temple, including those of her parents. Kirie finds Shuichi, but both are now too exhausted to fight the spiral curse anymore. Their own bodies twist together, and a giant drill rises and closes the stairwell, ending the curse. In a post-credits scene, new people rebuild Kurouzo-cho over the ruins of the old town, but signs of the spiral curse returning appear.

== Reception ==
Uzumaki was nominated for an Eisner Award in the category of "Best U.S. Edition of Foreign Material" in 2003. The Young Adult Library Services Association chose the first volume for its list of the "Top 10 Great Graphic Novels for Teens" in 2009. The manga was also included on its list of the 53 "Great Graphic Novels for Teens". Viz Media's Deluxe edition ranked No. 172 in Diamond's Top 300 Graphic Novels in October 2013 with a total of 784 copies sold. IGN placed Uzumaki at #2 under their "Top 10 Horror/Thriller Manga" list. About.com's Deb Aoki placed Uzumaki in her list of recommended horror manga, describing it as a classic of the genre. Uzumaki appeared in 1001 Comics You Must Read Before You Die (2011), and the reviewer wrote that it reminded him of the works of H.P. Lovecraft. MyM magazine praised the manga, calling it "one of the scariest manga series around."

In Manga: The Complete Guide (2007), Jason Thompson gave Uzumaki three and a half stars, and wrote that, taken as a whole, the manga succeeds as "an elegant and sometimes blackly humorous story of dreamlike logic and nihilism." Thompson featured the manga again in his House of 1000 Manga blog, praising it for its originality, in that it revolved around "a certain nightmarish, fatalistic way of looking at the world". ComicsAlliance author and comic artist Sara Horrocks also praised the manga, stating "What makes Uzumaki such a strong work is how precise it is in its mechanics. It is meticulous in the way that a curse might be."

For the first volume, Theron Martin from Anime News Network gave it a 'B', praising the art style and character designs, including Viz Media's new cover design. He stated, however, that "some of the attempts at horror get too preposterous for their own good." Greg Hackmann of Mania gave it an A, praising both its "well-honed" art and Ito's ability to form an effective overarching plot out of Uzumaki's loosely connected substories. Barb Lien-Cooper of Sequential Tart gave it a 7 out of 10, stating "The art is clean and simple. It works to help maintain the paranoia. The tone and pacing of this story are also just right. Altogether, one of the better horror stories I've read this year." Ken Haley of PopCultureShock gave it an 'A' and praised Ito's effective use of body horror, though he noted that some of the curse's effects were more humorous than frightening.

For the second volume, Lien-Cooper gave it 8 out of 10 stating, "What astounds me about Junji Ito's work is its deceptive simplicity and its flawless execution." Sheena McNeil, also from Sequential Tart, instead gave it a 9 out of 10, citing the novel effects of the curse Ito invented. Hackmann, however, gave it a 'B', explaining that "Unfortunately, this shift in story format is largely a failed experiment: with the overarching escape storyline put on hiatus, a good number of these disconnected episodes degenerate into simple, 'lookit, weird stuff happening' horrorfests that lack much of the creative spark exhibited throughout the first Uzumaki collection."

When reviewing the third and final volume, Haley again gave it an 'A', praising Junji Ito for providing answers to questions previously asked but not answered in a heavy or mundane form. Lien-Cooper gave the conclusion a 6 out of 10, and criticized the ending as nonsensical and the expanded background given in "Galaxies" as uninteresting.
