= Tomoyasu Hotei =

Japanese musician (born 1962)

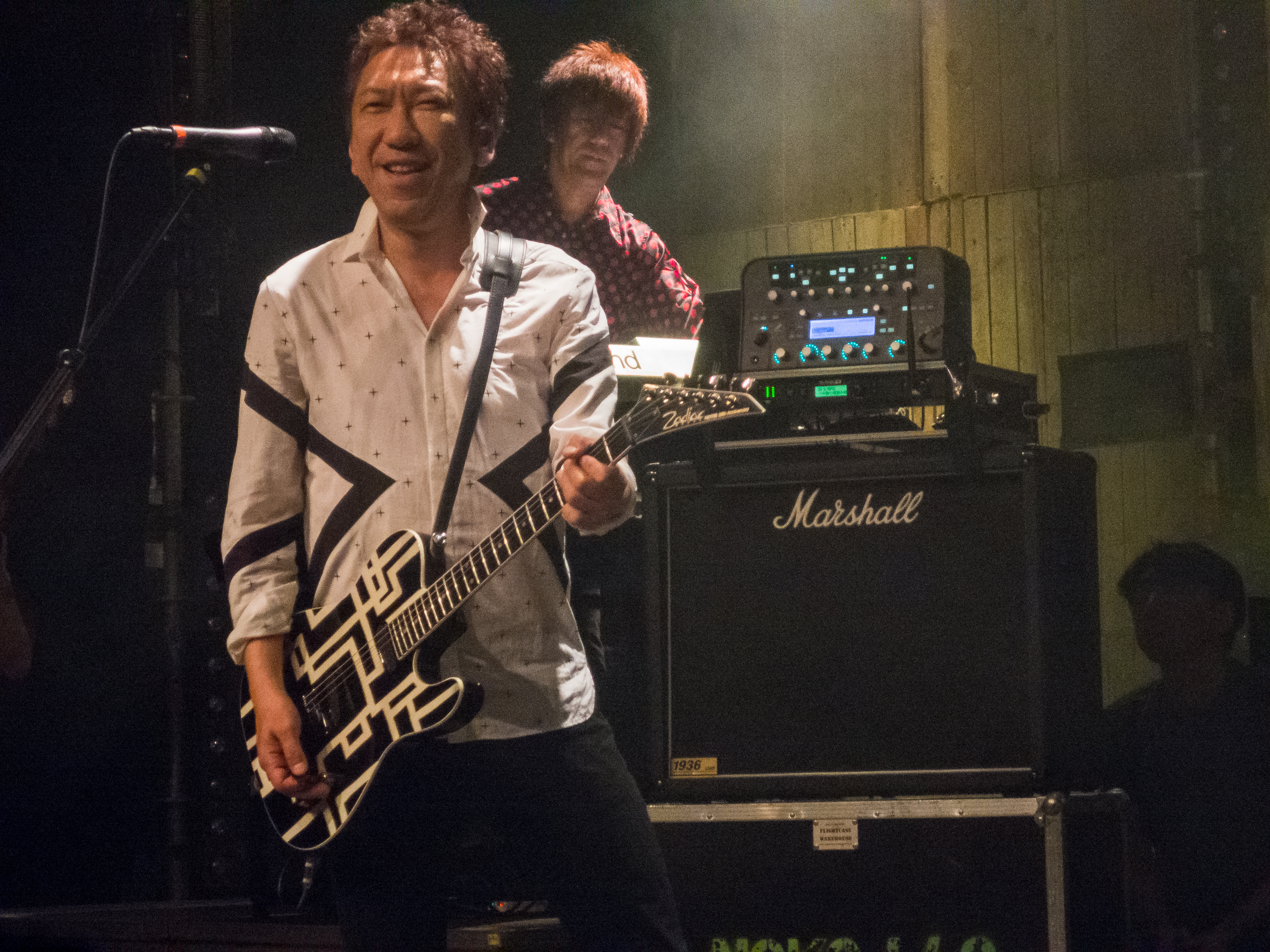
- Hotei at the 2017 Paaspop festival in Schijndel, Netherlands

Background information
- Born: Tomoyasu Hotei (布袋 寅泰, Hotei Tomoyasu); February 1, 1962 (age 64); Takasaki, Gunma, Japan
- Genre: Rock
- Occupations: Musician; singer; songwriter; composer; record producer; actor
- Instruments: Guitar; vocals; bass; drums; keyboards
- Years active: 1977–present
- Labels: Universal Music Japan; Spinefarm
- Formerly of: Boøwy; Complex
- Website: hotei.com

Tomoyasu Hotei (布袋 寅泰, Hotei Tomoyasu; born February 1, 1962), also known simply as Hotei (/ˈhoʊteɪ/ HOH-tay), is a Japanese musician, singer-songwriter, composer, record producer and actor. With a career spanning more than 40 years, Hotei claims record sales of over 40 million copies and has collaborated with artists from around the world. Hotei first rose to prominence in the 1980s as the guitarist for Boøwy, one of Japan's most popular rock bands, before starting a solo career.

In 2003, he was ranked number 70 on HMV's list of the 100 most important Japanese pop acts. He ranked second in a 2011 poll on who the Japanese people thought was the best guitarist to represent Japan. An iconic artist in his native Japan, he moved to London in 2005 and continues to perform and release music globally. Hotei's song "Battle Without Honor or Humanity" has been featured in numerous films, commercials, video games, and events, including Quentin Tarantino's feature film Kill Bill.

== Early life ==
Hotei was born to a Korean father and a Russian-born Japanese mother. He first began playing the guitar in junior high school. Inspired by a poster of T. Rex frontman Marc Bolan, he stole money from his mother's purse and bought a Stratocaster at fourteen years old. His first band, Blue Film, finished runners up in a school contest to Death Penalty, a band led by Kyosuke Himuro. Hotei was expelled shortly before graduation, because, when warned about his long hair he replied "Jesus had long hair!"

== Career ==
=== Boøwy (1981–1988) ===
After being expelled from high school, Hotei traveled to Tokyo. He became better acquainted with Kyosuke Himuro and they decided to hold auditions for a new band, which in 1981 became the six-member Bōi (暴威; lit. "Tyranny"). After changing their name to Boøwy, they released their first album Moral in 1982. They then became a quartet and went on to become major stars in Japan, releasing six studio albums in six years, and even playing the Marquee Club in London in 1985. In 1986 they released their first million-selling album, Beat Emotion. In 1988, the year they broke up, they became the first male artists to have three number-one albums within a single year on the Oricon chart. In 2003, HMV ranked Boøwy at number 22 on their list of the "100 Most Important Japanese Pop Acts".

=== Auto-Mod, solo career and Complex (1982–2012) ===
While in Boøwy, Hotei and drummer Makoto Takahashi were also members of Auto-Mod from 1982 to 1984. They released their first album Requiem in August 1983. Hotei also contributed significantly to their second album, Deathtopia, but left the band before its January 1985 release.

After the 1988 break up of Boøwy, Hotei released his debut solo album Guitarhythm that year via EMI Records, and established himself as a solo artist. Throughout the 1990s Hotei's profile continued to grow in Japan, with regular album releases supported by major tours and with Hotei writing songs and producing for other artists, including collaborations with both Japanese and international artists. Hotei also made two albums with Koji Kikkawa as Complex, both of which went to number one in the national charts. Guitarhythm is currently his only album sung completely in English. Hotei has recorded most of his albums outside of Japan, largely in Europe, including in London, Berlin, and Montreux.

Hotei has recorded with many foreign musicians, including playing on The Stranglers Hugh Cornwell's 1993 solo album, on stage with David Bowie at the Nippon Budokan in 1996, and at the closing ceremony of the 1996 Summer Olympics with Michael Kamen. He later recorded Guitar Concerto with Kamen. He has worked with Andy Mackay of Roxy Music, guitarist Chris Spedding and Mike Edwards of Jesus Jones. Hotei also sometimes tours Europe, including at a number of major festivals. His regular drummer in recent years, Zachary Alford, has previously played with Bruce Springsteen and David Bowie. Hotei's 1998 album Supersonic Generation, recorded in part with Apollo 440 and Ofra Haza, was released in 14 European countries.

In addition to many bestselling solo albums, Hotei composed and performed the score for Hiroyuki Nakano's Samurai Fiction, as well as starring in the film. He composed three tracks for the American film Fear and Loathing in Las Vegas together with Ray Cooper. Hotei's best known song "Battle Without Honor or Humanity" was used in Quentin Tarantino's feature film Kill Bill, the PlayStation 2 version of Dance Dance Revolution SuperNova and Michael Bay's feature film Transformers. Hotei recorded a cover of John Lennon's "Happy Xmas (War Is Over)" for Merry Axemas: A Guitar Christmas, an instrumental guitar Christmas album featuring tracks from guitarists including Richie Sambora, Jeff Beck, Joe Perry, Eric Johnson, Steve Vai and Steve Morse.

Hotei collaborated with Char for the 2006 single "Stereocaster". The following year he, Char and Brian Setzer held a short joint tour.

On July 30 and 31, 2011, Hotei and Kikkawa reunited as Complex for two nights at the Tokyo Dome. All proceeds were donated to aid the victims of the 2011 Tōhoku earthquake and tsunami.

On February 1, 2012, Hotei performed a concert at the Saitama Super Arena to celebrate his 50th birthday. His Boøwy and Auto-Mod bandmate Makoto Takahashi appeared as a special guest and together they played Boøwy's "Justy" and "No. New York". Hotei made his directorial debut in April 2012, with the stage play Psychedelic Pain, which was written by Yukinojo Mori and for which Hotei wrote the music. On May 8, it was announced that Hotei would move to London in June, in hopes of starting an international career.

=== Relocating to London and international focus ===
==== 2012–2014 ====
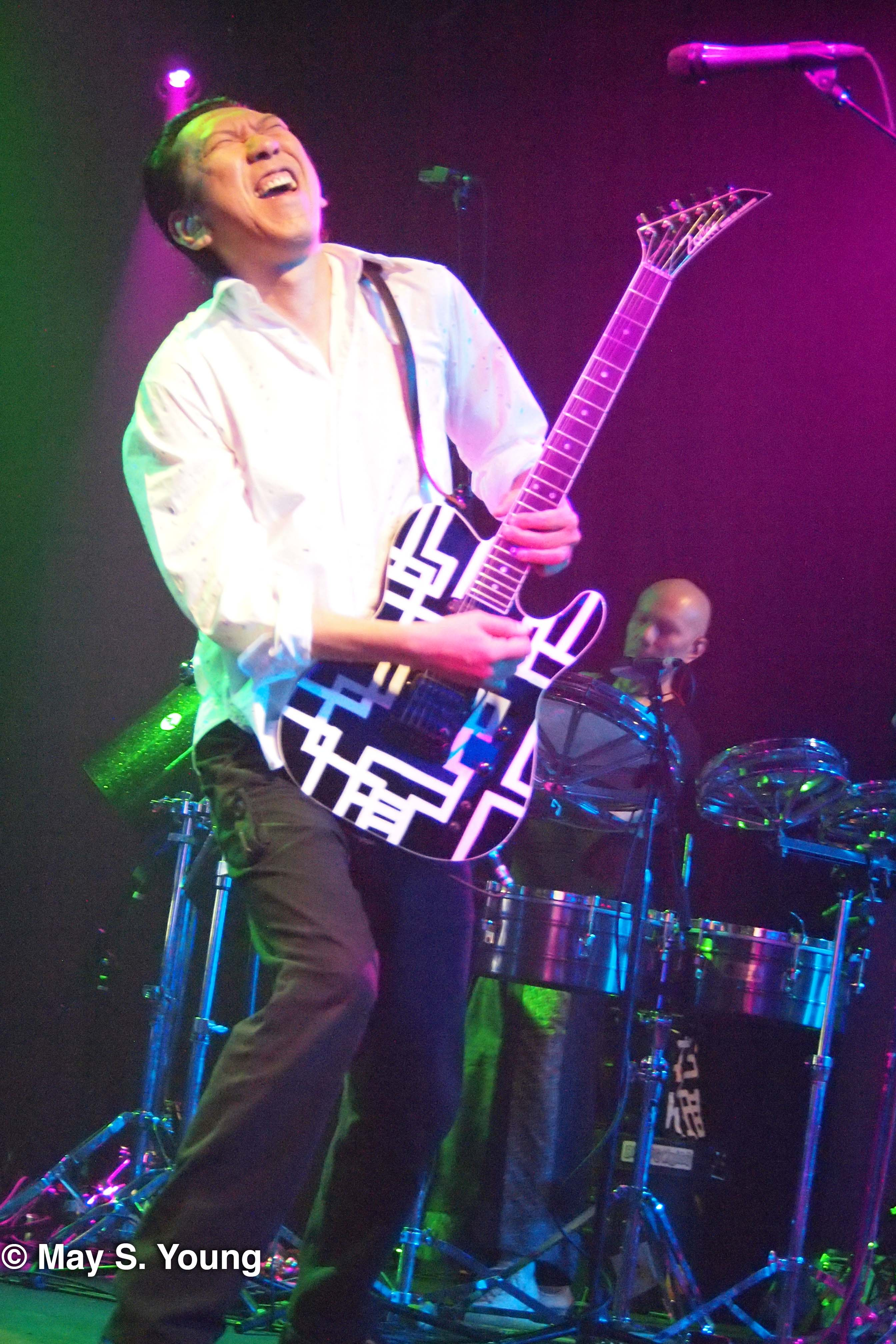
Hotei performing in New York City, 2013

After years of spending a great deal of time in the UK, Hotei and his family relocated fully to London in June 2012, primarily for Hotei to pursue his dream of an international career. Hotei played his first major show in the UK in December 2012 at The Roundhouse in London. In November 2013 Hotei played 2 headline shows, first at Shepherd's Bush Empire in London, and then at the Highline Ballroom in New York. In an interview with the Financial Times, Hotei commented, "Last year I turned 50...time goes quickly, it's my last chance to try and get my dream. I want to play all over the world."

On March 6, 2014, Hotei joined The Rolling Stones on stage during the final show of their tour in Japan. He was a surprise guest at their Tokyo Dome concert, playing the song "Respectable" before a crowd of 53,000 fans. Hotei's most famous song "Battle Without Honor or Humanity" was selected for a nationwide TV commercial in the UK for Buxton Water's "Naturally Pumped Up" campaign. The campaign launched in June 2014, with plans to run for six months.

Joined by band members Zachary Alford (drums), Tony Grey (bass), and Toshiyuki Kishi (keyboard/programming), Hotei played a series of private shows and summer festivals during June, July, and August 2014. This included appearances at England's Cornbury Festival, Switzerland's Montreux Jazz Festival, and the UK's Y Not Festival. An earlier warmup gig was held at The Lexington in London, and Hotei was also invited to perform solo as a special guest of Lord March during the Goodwood Festival of Speed. Live4Ever covered the Y Not Festival, describing Hotei as "undoubtedly the coolest man on site during his afternoon set on the main stage, performing instrumental sections fit for several people in his ability to flick between technically staggering solos and crunching guitar chords whilst jumping around the stage like an excitable Duracell rabbit."

During a brief trip back to Japan, Hotei played four sold-out shows at the Blue Note Tokyo in late August, and also performed at a private party for the launch of the new Lamborghini Huracán automobile. Hotei wrote and performed the theme song, "Trick Attack (Theme of Lupin The Third)", to the 2014 live-action film adaptation of the Lupin III manga. After spending much of the year writing and recording with a variety of collaborators, the album New Beginnings was released in Japan on October 1, 2014, the title a reflection of the new chapter in Hotei's career, after relocating to London. Iggy Pop contributed lyrics and vocals to two tracks on the album and Vula Malinga vocals to one.

==== 2015–2016 ====
Hotei's released the single "How The Cookie Crumbles" featuring Iggy Pop on vocals in June, the first single to be released from his forthcoming second English-language solo album Strangers, which was released by Spinefarm Records/Universal Music on October 16, 2015. It was his first album to be released globally outside Japan. It includes several songs released on New Beginnings. In addition to Pop, it also features Richard Kruspe from Rammstein, Matthew Tuck from Bullet for My Valentine, Noko and Shea Seger. The album release was accompanied by a performance at Islington Assembly Hall in London, with special guests Seger and Gary Stringer from British rock band Reef.

Hotei celebrated his 35th anniversary in music in 2016, which included 57 live shows in Japan in a variety of different venues, from small clubs to major arenas, and finishing with a 35-song performance at the Nippon Budokan in Tokyo on December 30. As well as his anniversary, Hotei continued to work internationally to support his Strangers album. In February 2016, Hotei performed showcases at Paradiso/Amsterdam, La Boule Noir/Paris and Cassiopeia/Berlin, with Noko on bass and Cliff Hewitt on drums. In July 2016 he performed live in Los Angeles for the first time, selling out The Troubadour, and also returned to Highline Ballroom in New York. A third single was released from the album, "Move It" featuring Richard Kruspe was released in April 2016, and a fourth, "Walking Through The Night" featuring Iggy Pop, was released in November.

Hotei contributed guitar to Zucchero Fornaciari's song "Ti voglio sposare" for the Italian singer's Black Cat album, which was released in April 2016, beginning a series of collaborations between the two artists which included Zucchero's first ever performances in Tokyo in May 2016, accompanied by Hotei, at an event organized by the Italian Embassy in Tokyo, and Hotei's first ever live appearance in Italy, at Zucchero's record-breaking Verona Arena run of dates, in September.

==== 2017–2018 ====
In February 2017 Hotei joined Fornaciari on stage at the Sanremo Music Festival in Italy and returned to Arena di Verona in May for two more performances. In April 2017 Hotei completed his first tour of Europe, performing in 8 cities in Germany, Switzerland, Netherlands, and Belgium over 2 weeks, including Paaspop Festival in the Netherlands. In May 2017 Hotei was special guest at Zucchero's first ever headline show in Tokyo with his own band. Hotei also performed his first headline live shows in Asia outside of Japan, in Taipei and Hong Kong.

Having completed the album in July, with recording largely taking place again in London, Hotei released his 17th solo album Paradox worldwide on October 25, 2017. It is his first Japanese-language album since Come Rain Come Shine almost five years earlier. The album was launched with three lyric videos, for the songs "Dreamers are Lonely", "Amplifire" and "Hitokoto". Hotei completed the Paradox tour in Japan in December 2017. His song "Kill to Love You" featuring Matthew Tuck from British heavy metal band Bullet for My Valentine was used in the UK trailers for Russian action movie Attraction in December 2017 and January 2018.

Hotei did an exclusive live streaming performance from British Grove Studios in London on March 24, for a NTT phone app. The one hour performance at 1pm was able to be watched live in Japan at 10pm and available for a few weeks thereafter. Hotei continued his live collaborations with Zucchero Fornaciari, joining him at two arena shows in Turin and Milan in January 2018, and then for two shows in Piazza San Marco, in Venice in July, for the Wanted - Un'altra storia Tour. Hotei collaborated again with the Hokuto no Ken franchise in September, for their 35th anniversary, with a new single called "202X", which was accompanied by an animated video and a second song "Boombastic".

On October 20, 2018, Hotei performed his first headline show in London for three years, at a special concert at Shepherd's Bush Empire, featuring his largest band presentation in the West, including a horn section, backing vocalists and featuring special guest Zucchero. The concert was again filmed for streaming by NTT in Japan. Hotei also toured again in Europe, with a return to Brussels and Zurich and his first headline show in Milan, which also featured Zucchero as special guest. Hotei ended 2018 with his first tour of Japan that was not tied in with an album release. The Tonight I'm Yours Tour featured a repertoire from Hotei's entire career and visited 18 Japanese cities. He performed live on Kohaku Uta Gassen on December 31 in Tokyo, his second performance on the major New Year's Eve TV show.

==== 2019–present ====
Hotei released his 18th solo studio album, Guitarhythm VI in May 2019, 10 years after Guitarhythm V. It features collaborations with Man With A Mission, Cornelius, keyboard player Mike Garson, and Hotei's former Boøwy bandmates Tsunematsu Matsui and Makoto Takahashi. The album was preceded by three singles in the month before its release, with lead single "Give It To The Universe" becoming Hotei's fastest streamed track up to that point. A nationwide summer Guitarhythm VI tour followed the album release, with Hotei using a UK rhythm section for the first time for a Japanese tour - Steve Barney (drums) and Mark Neary (bass). In September Hotei was special guest at two shows for the all star SAS band in Portsmouth and London UK, sharing the stage with Roger Taylor, Spike Edney and Justin Hawkins amongst others. Hotei reprised his GuitarRhythm Tour in Japan in December.

On November 25, 2020, Hotei released the collaborative album Soul to Soul, which features collaborations with his fellow Japanese Kazuya Yoshii and Glim Spanky, as well as international acts like Carlinhos Brown, Marc Lavoine, Calogero and Yang Kun.

== Personal life ==
Hotei has been married twice. He married singer Kumiko Yamashita in January 1986; they divorced in November 1997. He has been married to singer and actress Miki Imai since June 1999. They have a daughter (born July 26, 2002).

Although based in London, Hotei travels frequently between Japan and the UK for concert tours, recording, and event appearances. In February 2013, BBC World News ran a feature on Hotei and his recent life in London.

On June 14, 2007, Hotei allegedly assaulted his friend and punk rock singer Kō Machida. The incident happened when the two men got into an argument about a band they planned on forming together. Machida filed a police report on the 18th, and Hotei was ordered to pay a fine of 300,000 yen on October 1.

== Equipment ==
Hotei's best-known guitar is the TE-HT, a signature model developed in collaboration with Japanese manufacturer Fernandes Guitars around 1985, during his time with BOØWY. Conceived as a futuristic take on a Telecaster-style guitar, the instrument is distinguished by its angular headstock and hand-painted geometric pattern, which became closely associated with Hotei's visual identity.

The original TE-HOTEI “MAIN” guitar was used by Hotei during his work with BOØWY and subsequently with COMPLEX and as a solo artist. Over the years, it was modified, including the replacement of its neck and bridge with components made by Zodiacworks; the guitar's original body is among the few original components retained. Fernandes also marketed commercial versions of the signature design, including models in its TE-HT series.

In the early 1990s, Hotei used a TE-HT fitted with a Sustainiac system, first employing it during the recording of his album Guitarhythm II and later in live performances, including the 1991 Guitarhythm Reprise tour. Another Fernandes instrument associated with Hotei is a double-neck TE-HT, featuring two six-string necks and different pickup configurations; the instrument was later rebuilt by Zodiacworks.

Hotei has also used guitars by other manufacturers. His instruments include a Zemaitis Custom Deluxe “Wild”, a Fender Custom Shop Telecaster used in the music video for “Bambina”, and a Taylor Hot Rod Hotei Signature Model.

== Discography ==
=== Singles ===
- "Dancing with the Moonlight" (April 3, 1989)

Released only in the UK in two mixes on 12" inch and 7" inch vinyl.

- "Deja-vu" (December 12, 1990), Oricon Singles Chart Peak Position: #2
- "Beat Emotion" (June 29, 1991) #1
- "You" (December 4, 1991) #12
- "Lonely Wild" (July 22, 1992) #5
- "Saraba Seishun no Hikari" (さらば青春の光, July 28, 1993) #8
- "Surrender" (サレンダー, March 30, 1994) #2
- "Bara to Ame" (薔薇と雨, December 14, 1994) #13
- "Poison" (January 25, 1995) #2
- "Thrill" (スリル, October 18, 1995) #1
- "Last Scene" (ラストシーン, January 24, 1996) #3
- "Inochi wa Moyashitsukusu tame no Mono" (命は燃やしつくすためのもの, May 24, 1996) #13
- "Circus" (October 23, 1996) #3
- "Change Yourself!" (August 1, 1997) #6
- "Thank You & Good Bye" (January 28, 1998) #9
- "Bambina" (バンビーナ, April 16, 1999) #2
- "Nobody is Perfect" (May 12, 1999) #10
- "Vampire" (August 30, 2000) #8
- "Love Junkie" (October 25, 2000) #11
- "Born to Be Free" (January 1, 2001) #14
- "Russian Roulette" (February 6, 2002) #9
- "Destiny Rose" (October 17, 2002) #8
- "Nocturne No.9" (August 27, 2003) #13
- "Another Battle" (アナザー・バトル, June 30, 2004) #17
- "Identity" (February 23, 2005) #21
- "Back Streets of Tokyo" (August 23, 2006) #19

A collaboration with Brian Setzer.

- "Stereocaster" (November 8, 2006) #17

A collaboration with Char.

- "Still Alive" (August 4, 2010) #20
- "Promise" (May 18, 2011) #10
- "Don't Give Up!" (December 5, 2012) #16
- "Wuthering Heights" (嵐が丘, March 5, 2013) #17
- "How the Cookie Crumbles" (June 15, 2015)

UK and Europe only single, featuring Iggy Pop.

- "8 Beat no Silhouette" (8 BEATのシルエット, April 6, 2016) #13
- "Move It" featuring Richard Kruspe (April 2016)
- "Walking Through the Night" featuring Iggy Pop (November 2016)
- "Dreamers are Lonely" (October 2017)
- "Kill to Love You" (January 2018)
- "202X / Boombastic" (September 19, 2018) #15
- "Thanks a Lot" (April 2019)
- "Clone" (May 2019)
- "Give It To The Universe" (May 2019)

=== Studio albums ===
- Guitarhythm (October 5, 1988), Oricon Albums Chart Peak Position: #2
- Guitarhythm II (September 27, 1991) #1
- Guitarhythm III (September 23, 1992) #2
- Guitarhythm IV (June 1, 1994) #2
- King & Queen (February 28, 1996) #1
- Supersonic Generation (April 29, 1998) #4
- Fetish (November 29, 2000) #8
- Scorpio Rising (March 6, 2002) #6
- Doberman (September 26, 2003) #9
- Monster Drive (June 15, 2005) #10
- Soul Sessions (December 6, 2006) #15
- Ambivalent (October 24, 2007) #10
- Guitarhythm V (February 18, 2009) #5
- Come Rain Come Shine (February 6, 2013) #5
- New Beginnings (October 1, 2014) #4
- Strangers (October 16, 2015) #12 (Japanese edition)
- Paradox (October 25, 2017) #7
- Guitarhythm VI (May 29, 2019) #3
- Soul to Soul (November 25, 2020) #15

=== Compilations albums ===
- Guitarhythm Forever Vol. 1 (February 17, 1995) #1
- Guitarhythm Forever Vol. 2 (February 17, 1995) #2
- Greatest Hits 1990–1999 (June 23, 1999) #1
- Tonight I'm Yours / B-Side Rendez-vous (January 26, 2000, two albums) #4
- All Time Super Best (December 7, 2005) #5
- All Time Super Guest (August 17, 2011) #5
- 51 Emotions -the best for the future- (June 22, 2016) #5

=== Live albums ===
- Guitarhythm Active Tour 91-92 (April 8, 1992) #2
- Guitarhythm Wild (April 28, 1993) #3
- Space Cowboy Show (March 19, 1997) #3
- Space Cowboy Show Encore (April 25, 1997) #8
- Rock the Future Tour 2000-2001 (March 22, 2001) #15
- Tomoyasu Hotei Live in Budokan (December 26, 2002) #18
- Monster Drive Party!!! (September 14, 2005) #25
- MTV Unplugged (June 27, 2007) #38
- Climax Emotions -Live at Budokan- (June 28, 2017) #17

=== Soundtracks ===
- Beautiful Noise (1993)
- Fear and Loathing in Las Vegas (1998)
- SF Samurai Fiction (July 29, 1998) #29
- New Battles Without Honor and Humanity (新・仁義なき戦い/そしてその映画音楽, November 29, 2000) #41
- KT -Original Motion Picture Soundtrack- (May 22, 2002)
- Kill Bill Vol. 1 (2003)
- Electric Samurai (March 30, 2004) #24
- Lupin III (2014)
- Demon City (2025)

=== Other albums ===
- Battle Royale Mixes (December 24, 1996)

Limited release.

- Guitar Concerto (June 1, 1998) #14

Collaboration with Michael Kamen.

- Battle Royale Mixes II (July 23, 1998) #18

Limited release.

- Guitarhythm Box (December 24, 2008) #52

Contains Guitarhythm I, II, III, IV, a preview of V, and a live DVD.

- Modern Times Rock'N'Roll (Party Mix) (November 25, 2009)

iTunes Store limited digital download.

- Modern Times Rock'N'Roll (December 23, 2009) #12

Cover album of Western hits. Also released as a limited quantity USB flash drive on the same day.

- Hotei Memorial Super Box (February 1, 2012) #23

=== Other work ===
- Wired (June 21, 1993)
- Sputnik: The Next Generation (1996)
- Arena (1996)
- Merry Axemas: A Guitar Christmas (1997)
- "Gessekai" (May 13, 1998)
- Tribute Spirits (May 1, 1999)
- "Hot Chocolate" (January 25, 2006)

A single by Rip Slyme. Appears on "Battle Funkastic ~Rip Slyme VS Hotei~", a mash-up of Hotei's "Battle Without Honor or Humanity" and Rip Slyme's "Funkastic".

- Grace (September 14, 2007)
- Circus (March 16, 2011)
- "All You Need Is Love" (March 7, 2012)

A charity single by Japan United with Music, composed of many different Japanese artists, for recovery from the 2011 Tōhoku earthquake and tsunami. Performs one of the guitar solos.

- "Saraba, Itoshiki Kanashimitachi yo" (November 21, 2012)
- "Back in Love Again" (December 19, 2012)
- Japonism (October 21, 2015)
- What Happens Next (February 24, 2015)
- Black Cat (April 2016)

=== Home videos ===
- Guitarhythm (July 11, 1989)
- Guitarhythm Active Tour '91-'92 (March 25, 1992)
- Guitarhythm Wild (June 16, 1993)
- Serious Clips (July 27, 1994)
- Guitarhythm Serious! Climax (May 17, 1995)
- Cyber City Never Sleep (May 24, 1996)
- H (October 9, 1996)
- Space Cowboy Show (April 25, 1997)
- Space Cowboy Show Encore (1997)

Only given to those who bought Space Cowboy Show on both VHS and DVD.

- SSG Live "Rock the Future" (October 7, 1998)
- Greatest Video 1994-1999 (July 16, 1999)
- Tonight I'm Yours (May 16, 2000), Oricon DVDs Chart Peak Position: #8
- Rock the Future Tour 2000-2001 (May 16, 2001) #23
- Hotei Live Jukebox (July 25, 2001) #18
- Live in Budokan (July 29, 2003)
- Beat Crazy Presents Live @ AX (May 21, 2003) #31
- Doberman DVD (November 3, 2003) #38
- The Live! Doberman (June 30, 2004) #8
- Top Runner Full Version (March 30, 2005) #56

Limited release.

- Monster Drive Party!!! (September 14, 2005) #12
- All Time Super Clips (May 15, 2006) #21
- All Time Super Best Tour (June 26, 2006) #7
- Hotei presents "Super Soul Sessions" Brian Setzer vs Hotei vs Char (June 27, 2007) #12
- MTV Unplugged (June 27, 2006) #26
- Hotei and The Wanderers Funky Punky Tour 2007-2008 (April 23, 2008) #19
- Tōdai-ji+G.V. / Time and Space (November 25, 2009) #15

Limited release.

- Hotei+Tōdai-ji Tomoyasu Hotei Special Live -Fly into your Dream- (November 25, 2009)
- Guitarhythm V Tour (November 25, 2009) #154
- 30th Anniversary Anthology I "Souseiki" (September 14, 2011) #3
- 30th Anniversary Anthology II "Ifuu Doudou" (September 14, 2011) #2
- 30th Anniversary Anthology III "Ichigo Ichie" (December 9, 2011) #14
- We Are Dreamer ~50th Birthday Special Celebration Gig~ (February 1, 2012) #10
- Hotei Live In London- Electric Samurai- Live at O2 Shepherd's Bush Empire (August 27, 2014) #53
- Tomoyasu Hotei Japan Tour 2014 -Into the Light- (June 10, 2015) #19
- Hotei Jazz Trio Live at Blue Note Tokyo (June 10, 2015) #36

== Filmography ==
- SF Samurai Fiction as Rannosuke Kazamatsuri (1998)
- New Battles Without Honor and Humanity as Tochino Masatatsu (also known as Another Battle, 2002)
- Red Shadow Akakage as Rannosuke Kazamatsuri (2001)
- Akai Tsuki as Colonel Osugi (2004)
- The Smashing Machine as himself (2025)

== Video games ==
- Stolen Song (Sony Computer Entertainment, May 21, 1998 for PlayStation; Toshiba EMI, July 8, 1998 for Windows 95)

== In popular culture ==
- His cover of "Immigrant Song" is the entrance theme for New Japan Pro-Wrestling wrestler Togi Makabe, who uses it as a tribute to legendary wrestler Bruiser Brody who used the original version of "Immigrant Song" as his entrance theme.
- "Battle Without Honor or Humanity" was featured in the American movies S.W.A.T., Kill Bill, The Mitchells vs. the Machines, Transformers, Hotel for Dogs, and Team America: World Police, and in the games Dance Dance Revolution SuperNova and Pop'n Music Carnival 13. It also made an appearance in a first season episode of My Name Is Earl, and has been used in a variety of automobile ad campaigns worldwide. It is also the intro theme used during the Colin Cowherd radio show syndicated in the United States via ESPN Radio. The song was also used in the trailer for the PlayStation 3 game Gran Turismo HD. It is also used in the World Series of Poker Mobile Game
- "Russian Roulette" was featured in an opening video of the PS2 game Onimusha 2: Samurai's Destiny.
- "Bambina," "Russian Roulette," and "Nocturne no. 9" were featured in Konami's Guitar Freaks mixes 4/3 and 8/7, and Drummania V, respectively.
- "Thrill" was featured in the video game Osu! Tatakae! Ouendan and "Bambina" was featured in its sequel.
- "Identity" was used in the Japanese TV commercial for the Nintendo GameCube video game Star Fox Assault.
- "Bambina," "Thrill" and "Battle Without Honor or Humanity" were included as Rocksmith 2014 downloadable-content.
- "Thrill" is used by Japanese wrestler Danshoku Dino as his entrance theme song.
