= Masanobu Ando =

Japanese actor

- 安藤 政信
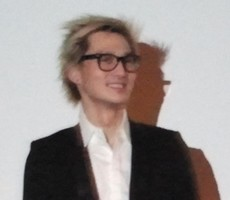
- Ando in 2011
- Born: May 19, 1975 (age 51); Kawasaki, Kanagawa, Japan
- Occupations: Actor, Director
- Years active: 1994–present
- Known for: Kids Return, Battle Royale
- Children: 2

Masanobu Ando (安藤 政信, Andō Masanobu; born May 19, 1975) is a Japanese actor.

Ando has appeared in films such as Takeshi Kitano's Kids Return (1996), Kinji Fukasaku's Battle Royale (2000), Takashi Miike's Sukiyaki Western Django (2007), and Chen Kaige's Forever Enthralled (2008). He also appears in Tsai Ming-liang's award-winning film No No Sleep (2015), in a series of statically filmed urban scenes without dialogue.

== Career ==
When Masanobu Ando completed school his direction towards a specific career path was not immediately concrete. In 1994 he was approached by a talent scout on the street and was offered an acting role, which began a new journey for Ando and his acting career. Ando's career took off after starring in his first film, Takeshi Kitano's Kids Return (1996), which became one of Kitano's most successful films in Japan. He played the role of Shinji, a high school student who gave up school to pursue boxing with his best friend. Ando became a popular young actor in Japan during the late 1990s, but his career slowed down in the 2000s, when he took fewer roles and was only in one or two films per year. He is most famous in the West for his psychopath-killer role of Kazuo Kiriyama in Kinji Fukusaku's Battle Royale (2000), a blockbuster dystopia film, which managed to be one of the most famous blood and gore films of the decade.

In 1998 he visited Russia to film for a Japanese show, Seinen wa Kouya wo Mezasu, where he travelled from Vladivostok to Khabarovsk along the Trans-Siberian Railway. Ando co-starred in Takashi Miike's Big Bang Love, Juvenile A with Ryuhei Matsuda. He played a supporting role in Shinya Tsukamoto's Nightmare Detective. Ando also appeared in Katsuhito Ishii's Smuggler. He has taken part in the Toronto Film Festival.

Around 2016, the twentieth anniversary of his entry into the film industry, Ando made a comeback and starred in several films, including Sailor Suit and Machine Gun: Graduation, Gonin Saga, and Sadako vs. Kayako.

== Personal life ==
Ando is married and has two children.

== Filmography ==
=== Film ===
- Rex: A Dinosaur's Story (1993)
- Kids Return (1996), Shinji
- Innocent World (1998)
- Adrenaline Drive (1999), Satoru Suzuki
- Poppoya (1999), Toshiyuki Yoshioka
- Monday (2000), Mitsuo Kondo, the dead man
- Space Travelers (2000), Makoto Fujimoto ("Black Cat")
- Battle Royale (2000), Kazuo Kiriyama, otoko 6-ban
- Transparent: Tribute to a Sad Genius (2001), Kenichi Satomi
- Red Shadow (2001), Akakage
- Drive (2002), Kodama Makato
- Karaoke Terror (2003), Sugioka
- Tokyo 10+01 (2003), Fake
- Short Films (2003)
- Sonic Four: Peace Vibe (2003)
- 69 (2004), Tadashi "Adama" Yamada
- Black Kiss (2004), Tatsuo Sorayama
- Synesthesia (2005), Takashi Nohara
- Aegis (2005), Don-chol
- Big Bang Love, Juvenile A (2006), Shiro Kazuki
- Green Mind, Metal Bats (2006), Ishioka
- Crickets (2006), Taichi
- Strawberry Shortcakes (2006), Kikuchi
- Nightmare Detective (2006), Detective Wakamiya
- Sakuran (2006), Seiji
- Sukiyaki Western Django (2007), Yoichi
- Forever Enthralled (2008), Ryuichi Tanaka
- The Butcher, the Chef and the Swordsman (2010)
- Seediq Bale (2011, part 1, 2), Genji Kojima, Constable at Tonbara clan
- Smuggler (2011), Spine
- R-18 Bungaku-sho Vol.1: Jijojibaku no Watashi (2013), Yamura
- Petal Dance (2013), Naoto
- No No Sleep (2015, Short)
- Gonin Saga (2015), Seiji Shikine
- Le coeur régulier (2016), Jiro
- Sadako vs. Kayako (2016), Spiritual Medium Kyozo
- A Flower Aflame (2016), Yasunori Ochi
- Sailor Suit and Machine Gun: Graduation (2016), Hajime Gakuto
- Still Life of Memories (2018), Haruma
- Lenses on Her Heart (2018), Yuji Kiba
- Code Blue the Movie (2018), Hiroki Shinkai
- Day and Night (2019), Kenichi Kitamura
- The Fable: The Killer Who Doesn't Kill (2021), Suzuki
- Zokki (2021)
- Rurouni Kenshin: The Beginning (2021), Takasugi Shinsaku
- The Setting Sun (2022), Jiro Uehara
- My Brother, The Android and Me (2022)
- Thousand and One Nights (2022), Yōji
- Rohan at the Louvre (2023), Ryūnosuke Tatsumi
- The Yin Yang Master Zero (2024), Heguri no Sadafumi
- Stay Mum (2024), Yasuo Inukai
- City Hunter (2024), Hideyuki Makimura

=== Television ===
- My Friend's Lover (1997), Tomoya Kashiwagi
- When the Saints Go Marching In (1998), Ren Takahara
- Blue Days (1998), Juri Sawaki
- Seinen wa Kouya o Mezasu (1999, TV Movie), Jun
- Gakko no Kaidan: Haru no Noroi Special (2000, TV Movie), Satô (segment "Kyôfu shinrigaku nyûmon")
- Higashino Keigo Mysteries (2012), Bito Shigehisa / Akiyama Yuichi
- Code Blue (2017)
- Your Turn to Kill (2019)
- Awaiting Kirin (2020–21), Shibata Katsuie
- Ship of Theseus (2020)
- The Sun Stands Still: The Eclipse (2020)
- Fishbowl Wives (2022), Takuya
- House of the Owl (2024), Ichiro Ogami
- Passing the Reins (2025), Hiroshi Hironaka
- Song of the Samurai (2026), Tanaka Shinbei
- Shadows of the Ten Ninja (2026), Sanada Yukimura

== Awards ==
- 1996: Hochi Film Award – Newcomer Award (Kids Return)
- 1996: Golden Arrow Award – Newcomer Award (film) (Kids Return)
- 1996: Nikkan Sports Film Award – Best Newcomer (Kids Return)
- 1996: Japanese Movie Critics Awards – Best Newcomer (Kids Return)
- 1996: Kinema Junpo Award – Best New Actor (Kids Return)
- 1997: Japan Academy Prize – Newcomer of the Year (Kids Return)
- 1997: Mainichi Film Awards – New Talent Award (Kids Return)
- 1997: Tokyo Sports Film Award – Best Newcomer (Kids Return)
- 1997: Yokohama Film Festival – Best New Talent (Kids Return)
