= Natsuki Katō =

Japanese actress, singer, and model (born 1985)

- 加藤夏希
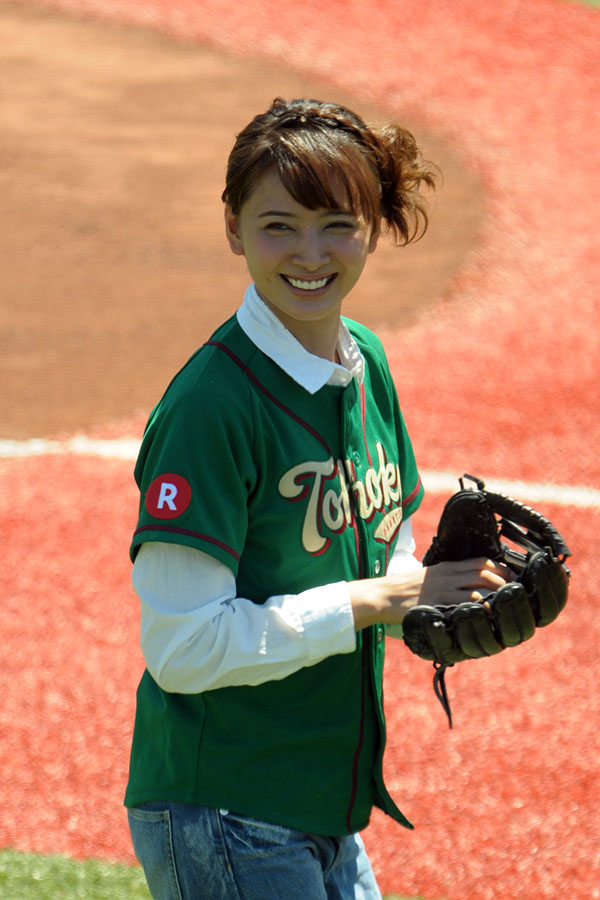
- Katō in 2014
- Born: July 26, 1985 (age 41); Yurihonjo, Akita Prefecture, Japan
- Occupations: Actress; singer; model
- Years active: 1999–present
- Spouse: Unknown (m. 2014)
- Children: 4

Natsuki Katō (加藤 夏希, Katō Natsuki; born July 26, 1985 in Yurihonjo, Akita Prefecture) is a Japanese actress, singer and former fashion model, regularly appearing on television in various roles.

== Career ==
In November 2010, Akita Prefecture chose her as one of the two official PR-Ambassadors, along with Nozomi Sasaki, with the purpose of creating a better image for the prefecture.

== Personal life ==
Katō is known for being a fan of anime and manga.

On June 6, 2014, Katō announced on her blog that she has married a non-celebrity man. Their wedding ceremony was held on March 16, 2015. On March 12, 2016, during the Kobe Collection 2016 SPRING/SUMMER fashion event, she announced her first pregnancy. They had their first daughter in July 7, 2016, then their first son in February 2019, and finally their second son in January 2021. On January 10, 2024, Katō announced through her official social media account that she and her husband are expecting their fourth child. On May 28, she gave birth to her second daughter.

== Filmography ==
=== Film ===
Year	Title	Role	Notes
1999	Moero!! Robocon VS Ganbare!! Robocon	Robina	
2001	Eko Eko Azarak 4	Misa Kuroi	
2001	Stacy	Eiko	
2001	Sekai no Owari to Iu Na no Zakkaten	Izumi Kanai	
2002	Lament of the Lamb	Chizuna Takashiro	
2002	Tokyo 10+01	Coco	
2002	Kamen Rider Ryuki: Episode Final	Miho Kirishima (Kamen Rider Femme)	
2003	Battle Royale II: Requiem	Saki Sakurai	
2003	Gun Crazy 4: Requiem for a Bodyguard	Miki Miyamoto	
2008	Hana yori Dango Final: The Movie	Shigeru Okawahara	
2008	The Monster X Strikes Back/Attack the G8 Summit	Sumire Sumidagawa	
2008	Osaka Hamlet	Yuka Akashi	
2009	Goemon	Dancer	
2010	Pokémon: Zoroark: Master of Illusions	Rioka (voice)	
2011	Paradise Kiss	Kaori Asou	
2011	Red Tears	Sayoko Mitarai	
2012	Musashino-sen no Shimai	Ranko Midorikawa	
2015	Tsunagaru	Aiko	
2026	The Convenience Store	Kaho Saruwatari	

=== Television ===
Year	Title	Role	Notes
1999–2000	Moero!! Robocon	Robina / Natsuki	
2000	Wakareru 2-ri no jiken-bo	Makoto Nanami	
2000	Abarenbo Shogun		
2002	Hungry Heart: Wild Striker	Miki Tsujiwaki (voice)	
2005	Go! Go! Heaven!	Sachiko Koboyashi / Julia	
2005	Onegai My Melody	Kanade Yumeno (voice)	
2005	Aim for the Ace!		
2007	Hana yori Dango 2	Shigeru Okawahara	
2007	Sushi Ōji!	Umi Minamoto	
2008	4 Shimai Tantei Dan	Ayako Sasamoto	
2009	Ochaberi	Hiromi Kanda	Ep. 15
2009	Real Clothes	Ryo Sasaki	
2010	Moyasimon: Tales of Agriculture	Haruka Hasegawa	
