= Pandōra =

- Directed by: Takashi Miike
- Music by: Koji Kikkawa
- Release date: 2002
- Country: Japan

Pandōra (パンドーラ) is a 2002 music video directed by Takashi Miike.

== Cast ==
- Seizo Fukumoto
- Koji Kikkawa

== Reception ==
Reviewer Panos Kotzathanasis of Asian Movie Pulse wrote that "the production values are quite higher than what we usually come across in the category, particularly in the samurai part" and that "Kikkawa and Seizo Fukumoto as the leader of the villains add even more coolness to the production", concluding that "this is a work solely addressed to fans of either Miike or Kikkawa, but I feel that no one will be disappointed watching the music video."
