= No No Sleep =

2015 film directed by Tsai Ming-liang

- Film poster
- 無無眠
- Directed by: Tsai Ming-liang
- Produced by: David Cao
- Starring: Masanobu Andō; Lee Kang-sheng
- Cinematography: Liao Pen-Jung
- Edited by: Lei Chen-Ching
- Production company: Youku.com (China)
- Distributed by: Youku.com (China)
- Release date: 21 April 2015
- Running time: 34 minutes
- Country: China/Taiwan/Hong Kong
- Language: None

No No Sleep (traditional Chinese: 無無眠; simplified Chinese: 无无眠; pinyin: Wu wu mian) is a 2015 mainland China—Taiwan—Hong Kong short film by Taiwanese film director Tsai Ming-liang, winning Best Director at the Taipei Film Awards in 2015. It features Taiwanese actor Lee Kang-sheng and Japanese actor Masanobu Andō, and includes non-sexual full-frontal male nudity.

== Plot ==
No No Sleep consists of a series of scenes filmed with a static camera and without dialogue in a variety of urban locations, such as train tracks, a subway train, a bath-house and a sleep chamber.

== See also ==
- List of Chinese films of 2015
- Nudity in film (East Asian cinema since 1929)
