= Emperor (2012 film) =

2012 film by Peter Webber

- Theatrical release poster
- Directed by: Peter Webber
- Written by: Vera Blasi; David Klass
- Based on: His Majesty's Salvation by Shiro Okamoto
- Produced by: Russ Krasnoff; Gary Foster; Yoko Narahashi; Eugene Nomura
- Starring: Tommy Lee Jones; Matthew Fox; Eriko Hatsune; Toshiyuki Nishida; Masatoshi Nakamura; Kaori Momoi; Colin Moy
- Cinematography: Stuart Dryburgh
- Edited by: Chris Plummer
- Music by: Alex Heffes
- Production companies: Krasnoff Foster Productions; United Performers' Studio
- Distributed by: Roadside Attractions (United States); Shochiku (Japan)
- Release dates: September 14, 2012 (TIFF); March 8, 2013 (United States); July 27, 2013 (Japan)
- Running time: 105 minutes
- Countries: United States; Japan
- Languages: English; Japanese
- Box office: $14.9 million

Emperor is a 2012 American-Japanese historical drama film directed by Peter Webber. Tommy Lee Jones and Matthew Fox star in lead roles as General Douglas MacArthur and Brigadier General Bonner Fellers respectively.

== Plot ==
Brigadier General Bonner Fellers is sent to Japan as a part of the Allied occupation force after World War II, tasked with arresting Japanese war criminals, including former Prime Minister Hideki Tojo. He's also seeking his former Japanese girlfriend, Aya Shimada, with the assistance of his Japanese interpreter and driver, Takahashi.

Tojo is arrested, but the Supreme Commander for the Allied Powers, General Douglas MacArthur, informs Fellers that Emperor Hirohito is being shielded from war crimes trials, to prevent a Japanese revolt, despite loud American calls he should pay personally for Japan's war crimes. MacArthur gives Fellers ten days to investigate the Emperor to decide the occupation force's next steps. Fellers and his staff interrogate the high-profile Japanese officials who advised Emperor Hirohito at the start of the war. Fumimaro Konoe, the former prime minister, gives no conclusive evidence of the Emperor's complicity in starting the war. Kōichi Kido, Lord Keeper of the Privy Seal, reneges on a meeting with Fellers, fearing retribution. Teizaburō Sekiya, a member of the Privy Council, gives no evidence exonerating the Emperor.

Takahashi informs Fellers that Aya's Tokyo apartment was bombed, and investigates her hometown, Shizuoka. Fellers recalls his 1940 visit to Tokyo when he reunited with Aya, then an English teacher; she returned to Japan after her father's death. Fellers immediately travels to Shizuoka and orders Takahashi to find a list of the dead. Fellers recalls his visit to Aya's uncle, General Kajima, for help with a paper on the mindset of the Japanese soldier. Kajima insists that Japan would win a war against the US, because of the Japanese soldier's sense of duty to the Emperor.

Kido arrives unexpectedly to offer testimony about the Supreme Council's deadlock over the question of surrendering and how Hirohito recorded a broadcast offering surrender to thwart the radical militarists in the Imperial Army. Before the recording could be broadcast, the militarists attempted a coup and attacked the Imperial Palace. The Emperor and Kido survived and transmitted the recording. Because all the other witnesses committed suicide and all records were destroyed, Fellers is left with only Kido's testimony, claiming that although the Emperor's role is primarily ceremonial, Hirohito had been critical in ending the war. Fellers visits General Kajima, who explains the Japanese people's selflessness and strong devotion to cultural values drives them to both great sacrifice and unspeakable crimes. Kajima can't speak to the Emperor's guilt, but confirms his role in ending the war. He gives Fellers a box of folded letters from Aya addressed to him and confirms she had died in an Allied bombing raid. Heartbroken, Fellers leaves to go talk to MacArthur about keeping Hirohito as emperor for the Japanese people.

Fellers concludes the Emperor's guilt or innocence cannot be known, but his role in ending the war was undeniably significant. MacArthur is displeased by his report's lack of conclusive evidence. Fellers argues the Emperor should be exonerated as the Allies have already agreed to keep him as the head of state. Fellers arranges a meeting between MacArthur and the Emperor, and confesses to MacArthur his role in diverting Allied bombers from Shizuoka for personal reasons. MacArthur dismisses it because it cost no American lives. When Emperor Hirohito arrives, he offers himself to be punished alone in Japan's stead. MacArthur states he has no intention of punishing Japan or Hirohito, and wishes only to discuss collaboration regarding Japan's reconstruction. As Fellers leaves, he imagines a life with Aya that could no longer happen, and takes his translator out for a drink.

== Cast ==
- Matthew Fox as Brigadier General Bonner Fellers
- Tommy Lee Jones as General Douglas MacArthur
- Eriko Hatsune as Aya Shimada
- Masayoshi Haneda as Takahashi
- Colin Moy as Major General Richter
- Masatoshi Nakamura as Prince Konoe, former Prime Minister
- Isao Natsuyagi as Teizaburō Sekiya, member of the Privy Council
- Masatō Ibu as Kōichi Kido, Lord Keeper of the Privy Seal
- Takatarō Kataoka as Emperor Hirohito
- Shōhei Hino as General Hideki Tojo, former Prime Minister
- Toshiyuki Nishida as General Kajima

== Production ==
Principal photography began shooting in January 2012 in New Zealand.

Scenes used were shot on location at RNZAF Base Whenuapai and some Air Force personnel used as extras for the movie.

== Release ==
The film premiered at the 2012 Toronto International Film Festival and saw a limited release by Roadside Attractions in the United States on March 8, 2013. Producer Gary Foster, Matthew Fox and Tommy Lee Jones attended a Japanese premiere along with several Japanese actors and actresses on July 18, 2013, preceding its opening in the cinemas nationwide in Japan on July 27.

== Reception ==
On the review aggregator website Rotten Tomatoes, 31% of 89 critics' reviews are positive, with an average rating of 5.2/10. The website's consensus reads: "Despite a typically strong performance from Tommy Lee Jones, Emperor does little with its fascinating historical palate, and is instead bogged down in a clichéd romantic subplot." Metacritic, which uses a weighted average, assigned the film a score of 48 out of 100, based on 33 critics, indicating "mixed or average" reviews.

== See also ==
- The Sun, Alexander Sokurov's 2005 film on the same subject
