= Red Shadow (film) =

2001 film by Hiroyuki Nakano

- Film poster
- Directed by: Hiroyuki Nakano
- Screenplay by: Hiroshi Saito; Masatoshi Kimura
- Based on: Kamen no Ninja Akakage by Mitsuteru Yokoyama
- Starring: Masanobu Andō; Megumi Okina; Kumiko Asō; Jun Murakami; Naoto Takenaka
- Cinematography: Hideo Yamamoto
- Music by: Toshiyuki Kishi
- Backgrounds by: Akira Naitō
- Production companies: Toei Company, Ltd.; Kadokawa Shoten; h.m.p; Tube Entertainment; Dentsu; Toei Video
- Distributed by: Toei Company, Ltd.
- Release date: 11 August 2001 (Japan)
- Running time: 108 minutes
- Country: Japan
- Language: Japanese
- Box office: 700 million yen

Red Shadow (Japanese: RED SHADOW 赤影, Hepburn: Reddo Shadō Akakage) is a 2001 Japanese samurai film directed by Hiroyuki Nakano. The film stars Masanobu Andō in the title role and features a guest star appearance of Tomoyasu Hotei, returning from the 1998 spin-off and virtual prequel Samurai Fiction. The film is loosely based on the 1960s manga Kamen no Ninja Akakage.

== Plot ==
In 1545, the world was in the Warring States period. The servants surpassed the lord and defeated them frequently, and the Sengoku daimyo repeated fierce battles and were devoted to trade-in.

Among the ninjas who served them was a group of ninjas called the "Kage Clan". They serve the Sengoku daimyo Hidenobu Togo, and while faithfully performing all missions to unify the world, they make weapons and armor with metal that is stronger than any substance called "invincible steel" and meet mysterious ninjutsu. However, after a long time, the "invincible steel" dissipates and the number of people who can use the technique gradually decreases, and the legitimate successors of the Kage clan are the three people, Akakage, Aokage, and Asuka, who remain under the white shadow who is the leader. It was only leaving the young man. And I felt a big gap with the lesson passed down from generation to generation to the clan, "Working as a shadow for a peaceful world with light" to Togo, and the minds of Akakage and others began to get lost.

== Cast ==
- Masanobu Andō - Akakage
- Megumi Okina - Koto-Hime
- Kumiko Asō - Asuka
- Jun Murakami - Aokage
- Naoto Takenaka - Shirokage
- Fumiya Fujii - Ranmaru
- Shuhei Mainoumi - Rikimaru
- Kei Tani - Roushi
- Ryoko Shinohara - O-Rin
- Kitarō - Roushi, Mura no chourou
- Denden - Bonnobei
- Masahiko Tsugawa - Tougou Hidenobu, Sengoku Daimyou
- Yutaka Matsushige - Kamijou Takatora
- Alina Kabaeva - Olga, Circus no shoujo

== Reception ==
Mark Schilling of The Japan Times stated that "There is not a dull moment in the film." but also that there was "unfortunately, not much in the way of real thrills or laughs, which The Seven Samurai and Yojimbo manage to have, despite the lack of cool computer graphics", and that "One day, maybe, Nakano will get around to filming a movie".
