= Nagai Yume =

Manga short story by Junji Ito

長い夢
- Genre: Horror; Science fiction
- Manga
- Written by: Junji Ito
- Published by: Asahi Sonorama
- Magazine: Nemuki
- Published: January 1997
- Live-action television film
- Directed by: Higuchinsky
- Written by: Higuchinsky, Kyoichi Nanatsuki
- Music by: Zuntata
- Studio: KTV, Omega Micott, TV Asahi
- Released: 2000
- Runtime: 58 minutes

Nagai Yume (長い夢; lit. "Long Dream") is a short story by manga author Junji Ito, originally published as part of the Junji's Screaming Comics short series in January 1997 issue of Nemuki and collected in The Junji Ito Horror Comic Collection volume 1. A one-hour Japanese television drama adaptation was broadcast in 2000. The adaptation was directed by Higuchinsky, whose film adaptation of Ito's Uzumaki had been released earlier the same year. The story was also adapted in the second segment of the second episode of the anime Junji Ito Collection.

== Plot ==
Dr. Kuroda, a celebrated neurosurgeon, expresses severe doubt when a patient named Tetsuro Mukoda admits himself to the hospital, complaining of lengthening dreams. Kuroda's assistant, Dr. Yamauchi, believes there may be some truth to Mukoda's complaints. Another patient at the hospital, Mami Takeshima, who was admitted for treatment for a benign tumor, begins experiencing a heightened fear of death and has a harrowing encounter with Mukoda, who wanders the halls at night, too afraid to sleep.

Though he continues to believe Mukoda's symptoms are just hallucinations, Dr. Kuroda agrees to admit him and decides to observe and study his symptoms in detail. Using an EEG machine, Kuroda discovers that when Mukoda sleeps, there are brief moments when he enters rapid eye movement sleep for just a few seconds at a time. During this period, his brainwaves become erratic and his eyes thrash about wildly, only to suddenly stop. In that brief moment of REM, he is in the depths of his condition.

With each passing night, the perceived length of Mukoda's dreams steadily increases. As his dreams continue to lengthen, Mukoda begins to experience amnesia when he wakes up, often having to be reminded by Kuroda as to why he was at the hospital. He also confides to Kuroda that many of his dreams are extremely unpleasant, such as spending an entire year as a soldier hiding from an enemy force. Mukoda's mannerisms and intonation begin to change, speaking as if he were a person from a different century, and he becomes pale and gaunt as his illness worsens. Eventually, his body begins to undergo mutations as his dreams become several millennia long within his mind, actively evolving whilst still alive.

The psychological effects of his condition have also only continued to worsen, to the point that he can no longer differentiate his dreams from reality. Believing that Takeshima is his wife from within the dream world, a severely mutated Mukoda, suffering from psychosis, accuses Kuroda of trying to interfere in their 'relationship' when he wakes up. Shoving the doctor aside, Mukoda runs to Takeshima's room with Kuroda in hot pursuit. Terrified, Takeshima accuses Mukoda of being death, before Kuroda manages to intervene. Mukoda comes to his senses and asks, "What happens to the man who awakens from an eternal dream?"

Mukoda's mutations continue to worsen, and eventually, he barely resembles a human at all. One night, while Kuroda continues to study him, Mukoda enters REM sleep again and finally experiences an eternal dream. Kuroda, who had himself fallen asleep due to fatigue, awakens to see the result; with his spirit fleeing his body, Mukoda crumbles away into dust, leaving behind strange red crystals.

=== Manga ending ===
Shortly afterward, Takeshima confides to Yamauchi that her fear of death is lessening but that she is starting to experience long dreams. Believing that the illness Mukoda suffered from is contagious, Yamauchi consults Kuroda on the matter, who reveals that he had been using the crystals he obtained from Mukoda's remains on Takeshima in secret, having realized they were the secret to Mukoda's condition. Yamauchi is horrified by this, arguing that it desecrates the souls of the dying, but Kuroda reasons that humanity will have no reason to fear death if they have the option of having eternal dreams instead.

=== Film ending ===
In the television drama, the conclusion of the story continues beyond Mukoda's demise, and is significantly different from the ending of the story on which it is based.

After Takeshima begins to display the same symptoms of Mukoda's condition, Yamauchi voices his concerns of a potential contagion to Kuroda, who brushes him off, arguing that Takeshima is his patient. A few days later, one of the hospital's nurses, Miyama, informs Yamauchi that she had seen Kuroda entering Takeshima's room late at night, locking the door behind him. That night, Miyama is brutally stabbed to death. Yamauchi attempts to resuscitate her, only for Takeshima to arrive, covered in blood and brandishing a knife. Takeshima had suffered a similar psychotic break to Mukoda, and had killed Miyama while still believing that she was in a dream, one where Miyama had prevented her from entering into a relationship with Kuroda.

With his efforts to investigate the cases of the lengthening dreams interfered with by Kuroda, Yamauchi takes matters into his own hands and takes the key to Kuroda's office. Searching for evidence that may provide insight on the disturbing events that have unfolded, he finds a set of videotapes surrounding the case, and then discovers Kuroda's dark secrets. By testing the crystals from Mukoda's brain on Takeshima, Kuroda intends to find a way to enter the dream world, trying to reunite with the spirit of his deceased lover and former patient, Kana Sakurai, who died from an accidental overdose of phenobarbital administered by Kuroda during her treatment at the hospital, a few years before the events of the film. Kuroda, having experienced visions involving Kana throughout the film, has also been surreptitiously administering the chemical crystals to himself.

Kuroda suddenly appears in the office, and Yamauchi, horrified by what he has just learned, asks Kuroda why he would do such a thing. Kuroda reasons that humanity never needs to fear death again if they have the option to go into an eternal dream. Disgusted, Yamauchi replies that this would desecrate the spirits of the dying. Kuroda breaks down and reveals that despite taking the crystals, he is now unable to dream at all. Yamauchi comments on the poetic irony of the situation and prepares to leave, only for Kuroda to bludgeon him to death with a framed photograph of Kana. After a final encounter with Kana's spirit, who bids him farewell, the Doctor turns around to find that horrifyingly, the whole incident has been captured on a set of cameras. By administering the crystals to himself, he has now become infected by whatever caused Mukoda and Takeshima's condition.

Beset by powerful delusions and hallucinations, Kuroda descends into madness (all documented on the cameras), before suddenly waking up in a hospital bed to find Yamauchi - his death having been just another hallucination - and three other doctors taking notes. Much like how Mukoda had been seen scrawling gibberish onto the walls of his room on the ward, Kuroda had repeatedly written Kana's name on the wall multiple times. After Yamauchi asks if Kuroda is feeling okay, the doctor-turned-patient looks down at his mutated hands and breaks down in tears as he finally goes insane, bearing mutations similar to those Mukoda had displayed.

== Characters ==
- Doctor Kuroda: A celebrated neurosurgeon and the story's protagonist. He initially believes Mukoda's symptoms to be hallucinations, but is soon confounded by the increasingly-bizarre dreams Mukoda presents.
- Doctor Yamauchi: Kuroda's assistant and close friend, Yamauchi expresses concern towards Mukoda's condition.
- Tetsuro Mukoda: A young man complaining of increasingly long dreams, Mukoda wanders the hallways of his hospital at night, afraid to sleep. Over the ensuing days, he begins to physically mutate, as if he had really lived the amount of time he spent in his dreams, and loses an entire lifetime of memories every time he dreams as well, resulting in bizarre psychological manifestations of his condition. Mukoda eventually experiences an endless dream and shatters into pieces, leaving behind red crystals which Kuroda attempts to treat Mami Takeshima with.
- Mami Takeshima: A patient admitted to the hospital with a benign tumour, Takeshima has an intense and irrational fear of death, and is repeatedly terrified by Mukoda during his nightly wanderings around the hospital. She is later treated for her irrational fears by Kuroda using the crystals left after Mukoda died, and begins experiencing lengthening dreams as a result.
- Kana Sakurai: Appearing exclusively in the TV Drama, Kana was in a relationship with Kuroda. Much like Mami, Kana was admitted to hospital with a benign tumour, but accidentally died after an overdose of phenobarbital during treatment, leaving Kuroda grief-stricken.
