= Tokyo 10+01 =

TOKYO 10+01
- Japanese DVD cover featuring Snake
- Directed by: Higuchinsky
- Written by: Higuchinsky
- Produced by: Kazunori Okada; Hirohiko Yabe
- Starring: EDDIE; Natsuki Kato; Masanobu Andō; Kiyohiko Shibukawa (Kee); Eisuke Sasai
- Cinematography: Higuchinsky
- Music by: Masashi Yatabe
- Distributed by: KSS Films
- Release date: August 3, 2002
- Running time: 70 minutes
- Country: Japan
- Language: Japanese

TOKYO 10+01, also informally known as Tokyo Eleven, is a Japanese film directed by Higuchinsky that was released in 2003. To date it has not been officially released outside Japan, although it has been unofficially subtitled in English and German and released on DVD with Region 0 coding.

TOKYO 10+01 is heavily influenced by the 2000 Japanese film Battle Royale, to which it makes numerous references. The plot involves eleven strangers who are forced to play a game with a set time limit or face death. Each assigned a number from 1 through 11, they are fitted with bracelets containing poisonous hypodermic needles as opposed to Battle Royale's explosive collars. Whenever a player dies, a death announcement naming them and stating how many players remain is flashed onscreen. Two actors who respectively portrayed characters in both Battle Royale and its 2003 sequel, Battle Royale II: Requiem, also appear in TOKYO 10+01: Masanobu Andō, who played the character Kazuo Kiriyama in Battle Royale, and Natsuki Kato, who played the character Saki Sakurai in Battle Royale II. Kato's appearance alongside Ando in this regard is largely coincidental however, as Battle Royale II was released eleven months after TOKYO 10+01.

== Plot ==
In Neo Tokyo in 2XXX A.D., eleven strangers, each with various criminal backgrounds, awaken in a deserted warehouse where they are confronted by the mysterious Mr. K, the manager of the Black Papillon Foundation. They are told that they have been brought together to participate in a game conceived of by The Baron, the leader of the organization, in which they have to reach his mansion within eleven hours. The reward for this is 300 million yen and the chance to start their lives over by also expunging their criminal records. Each participant is fitted with a bracelet on their left wrists which has a timer indicating how much time is left in the game, and an alarm system. The latter is triggered when "hunters", who work for the Black Papillon Foundation and are armed with non-lethal laser guns which will knock the participants out of the game when they are shot, come within 50 meters. The bracelets also contain hypodermic needles which will inject the wearers with a lethal poison if they attempt to take the bracelets off or time runs out, thus forcing them all to play the game or face death.

Mr. K's black butterfly tattoo on his left wrist, which all of The Baron's children have. This is also the logo of the Black Papillon Foundation, and is featured in the film's title sequence.

Unarmed and after being divided into three teams, the game starts. The first indication that things are not what they seem occurs shortly into the game when Big Mac is shot and killed by some hunters, revealing that the players must now try to survive against opponents with real firearms. The three teams then split up and pursue separate routes. Fake manages to get hold of a gun that Snake stole from a hunter and thus take control of his team. The team of Jingi, Oolong and Jasmine encounters hunters after emerging from a tunnel, whom they fight and defeat, but are also killed. Ace, Micro, and Tall succeed in hotwiring a car thanks to Micro's technical expertise, but Ace is killed by a hunter. Fake decides to kill a member of his team, but the arrival of some hunters and Coco's quick thinking result in his apparent demise, while Prince is shot and falls to his death. Micro meanwhile succeeds in deactivating the dead Ace's bracelet, revealing a black butterfly tattoo on his wrist that both he and Tall also have. Hunters soon arrive however and kill them during an ensuing car chase. Coco and Snake manage to evade additional hunters, but Coco is wounded. With less than an hour left in the game and when the two are alone, she reveals why she hates men, but that she is glad that men like Snake exist. She gives him her compact as a token of remembrance before taking a bullet meant for him fired by Fake. Snake then confronts Fake with the revelation that except for him (Snake), all of the participants in the game have a black butterfly tattoo on their wrists, marking them as The Baron's children although they had different mothers. Fake is soon killed by a hunter and after slipping his bracelet off, Snake reaches The Baron's mansion as the last player left.

Here he is greeted by Mr. K, and it is revealed that the two colluded in order to enable Mr. K to take over the Black Papillon Foundation, while Snake would be delivered the man with a crescent-shaped scar on his forehead who killed his parents years ago. Believing this man to be The Baron, Snake confronts him only to find him dead and no scar on his forehead. Mr. K then shoots Snake and reveals that he himself is also one of The Baron's children, making him the eleventh player in the game and explaining the film's title. Mr. K rigged the game set up by his father by adding actual deaths as a factor to kill off his siblings, and he also turns out to be the very man with the crescent-shaped scar who Snake seeks vengeance against. Mr. K then apparently shoots and kills Snake. Snake however, survives his wounds and later that night infiltrates a bizarre costume party that Mr. K is attending. He confronts and kills Mr. K, revealing that his life was saved by Coco's compact which he had in his jacket pocket and deflected a potentially fatal bullet just before he himself is shot and killed by Mr. K's bodyguards.

== Cast ==
- EDDIE as Snake: the leader of a major civilian riot that wrecked the Tokyo Tower in a battle with police
- Natsuki Kato as Coco: a misandrist assassin with a penchant for Coco Chanel products
- Masanobu Andō as Fake: an artist skilled at counterfeiting paintings with no original talent
- Hitomasa Matsuzawa as Prince: a drag queen and pickpocket who steals from his car dealership customers
- Kiyohiko Shibukawa (as Kee) as Jingi: an archaic yakuza who extorts from video rental stores
- Miki Waterhouse as Oolong and Aya Waterhouse as Jasmine: twin Chinese illegal immigrants with a circus background
- Kenichi Honma as Ace: a casino blackjack manager and chronic cheater
- Kei Getsu as Tall: a professional pachinko player who cheats to win
- Yuuta Takayanagi as Micro: a child prodigy and Internet criminal
- Yuuta Sakamoto as Big Mac: a skilled practitioner of dine and dash and a fast runner despite his size
- Eisuke Sasai as Mr. K: the manager of the Black Papillon Foundation, who oversees the game
- Yoshiyuki Arashi as The Baron: the leader of the Black Papillon Foundation
- Makiko as Video Girl: the TOKYO 10+01 counterpart of Battle Royale's "Big Sister"

== Theme song ==
"Wipe Out" by the Japanese alternative rock/punk band The Salinger is heard during the end credits and at various times in the movie. Lead singer EDDIE plays Snake.
