= Complex (band) =

Japanese rock duo

- Origin: Japan
- Genres: Rock, pop rock
- Years active: 1988–1990, 2011, 2024
- Labels: Toshiba EMI, Eastworld
- Members: Kōji Kikkawa; Tomoyasu Hotei

Complex was a Japanese rock duo composed of guitarist Tomoyasu Hotei and singer Kōji Kikkawa. They released their self-titled debut in 1989, along with their first single and video, "Be My Baby". After a tour to promote the album, they released its follow-up, Romantic 1990, followed by a live album, 19901108 a year later.

The concert immortalized on the 19901108 CD and video turned out to be their last. They broke up sometime after the show, and in an interview Hotei said that the experience of Complex ended his friendship with Kikkawa (equating it to a divorce) and that he thought the whole thing was "a mistake". To date, neither Hotei nor Kikkawa has elaborated on the reason behind the band's breakup.

Following the band's breakup, both Hotei and Kikkawa continued their solo careers.

The band's label Toshiba EMI released a greatest hits compilation called Complex Best in 1998, and a DVD re-issues of their video catalog, which are currently out of print.

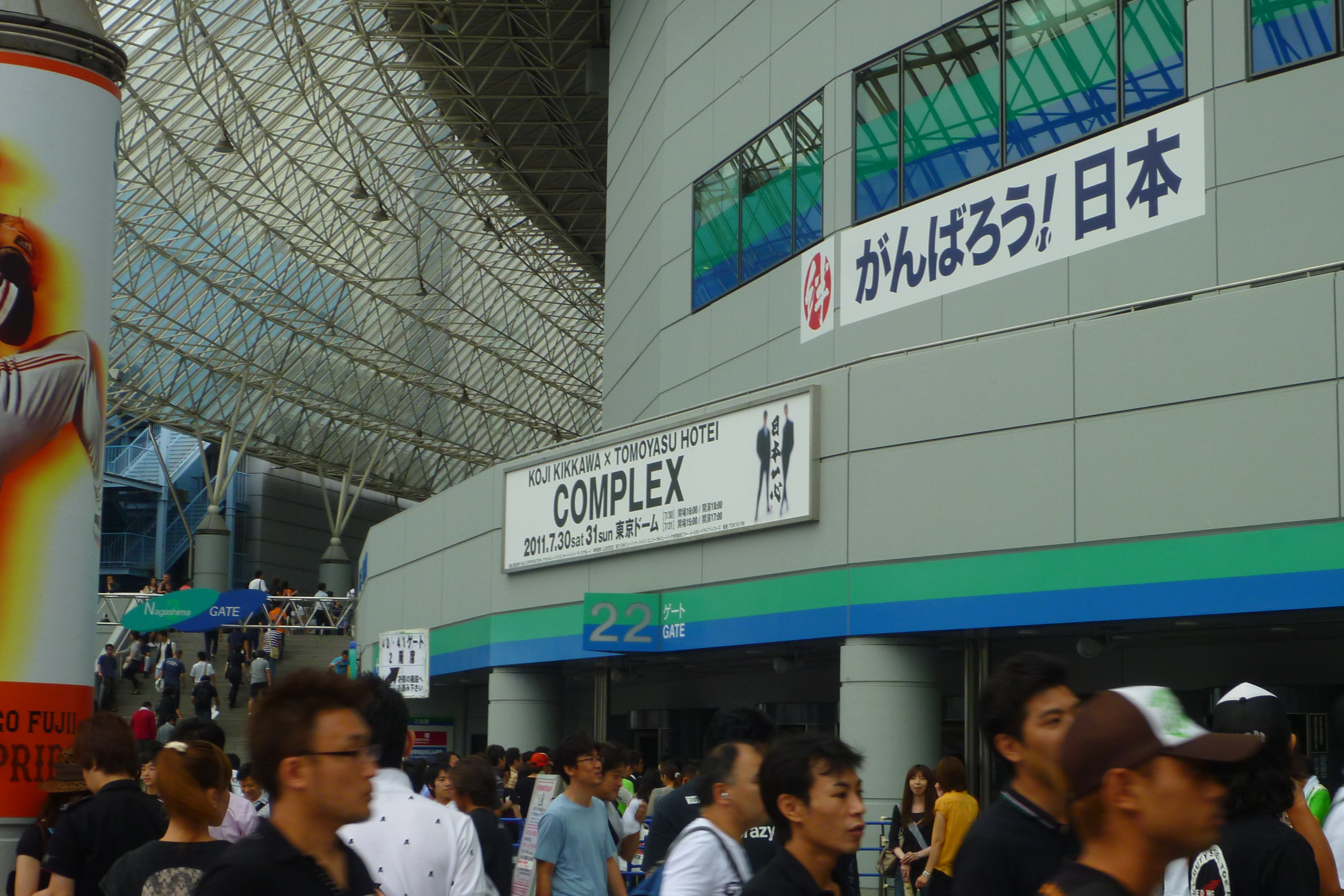
The Tokyo Dome on July 31, 2011, the day of their second reunion show.

On April 28, 2011, it was announced that after 21 years, Kikkawa and Hotei would reunite for a Complex show on July 30 and 31st at the Tokyo Dome. All proceeds were donated to aid the victims of the Tōhoku earthquake and tsunami. The performance was released on CD, DVD and Blu-ray in 2012. On May 15, 2024, Complex returned to the Tokyo Dome for a second time, this time to raise money for the victims of the 2024 Noto earthquake.

== Discography ==
=== Albums ===
- Complex (April 26, 1989)

All lyrics are written by Kōji Kikkawa, except "Clockwork Runners" by Tomoyasu Hotei; all music is composed by Hotei, except where noted. All songs arranged by Hotei.

No.	Title	Music	Length
1.	"Pretty Doll"	Kikkawa	4:00
2.	"Crash Complexion"		4:32
3.	"Don't Stop my Love" (恋をとめないで Koi wo Tomenai de)		3:44
4.	"Can't Stop the Silence"		4:37
5.	"Their Another Twilight" (2人のAnother Twilight Futari no Another Twilight)		4:01
6.	"Imagine Heroes"	Kikkawa	3:23
7.	"Clockwork Runners"		4:19
8.	"Be My Baby"		4:07
9.	"Back Alley Venus" (路地裏のVENUS Rojiura no Venus)	Kikkawa	4:13
10.	"Rambling Man"		3:20
11.	"I Don't Want You" (そんな君はほしくない Sonna Kimi wa Hoshikunai)		4:46
12.	"Cry for Love"	Kikkawa	5:45
Total length:			51:01

- Romantic 1990 (April 18, 1990)

All lyrics are written by Kōji Kikkawa, except where noted; all music is composed by Tomoyasu Hotei, except "Modern Vision" by Kikkawa. All songs arranged by Hotei.

No.	Title	Lyrics	Length
1.	"Romantica"	instrumental	2:05
2.	"Propaganda"	Hotei	3:52
3.	"Love Charade"		5:47
4.	"1990"		5:24
5.	"Blue"	Kikkawa, Hotei	5:30
6.	"Modern Vision"		4:23
7.	"The Wall"	Hotei	3:40
8.	"No More Lies"		4:00
9.	"Good Savage"		3:18
10.	"Half Moon"	instrumental	2:15
11.	"Dragon Crime (East & West)"		5:16
12.	"Majestic Baby"		4:03
13.	"After the Rain (Bloody China)" (AFTER THE RAIN (朱いChina) After the Rain (Akai China))		5:48
Total length:			55:28

- 19901108 (January 23, 1991, live album)
- Complex Best (February 6, 1998, compilation album)

=== Singles ===
- "Be My Baby" (April 8, 1989)

All lyrics are written by Kōji Kikkawa, except "Clockwork Runners" by Tomoyasu Hotei; all music is composed by Hotei. All songs arranged by Hotei.

No.	Title	Length
1.	"Be My Baby"	4:08
2.	"Clockwork Runners" (時計じかけの走者達 Tokei Jikake no Sōsha-Tachi)	4:13
3.	"Be My Baby" (Montserrat Mix)	4:03
Total length:		12:32

- "1990" (March 14, 1990)

All lyrics are written by Kōji Kikkawa; all music is composed by Tomoyasu Hotei, except "Just Another Day" by Kikkawa. All songs arranged by Hotei.

No.	Title	Length
1.	"1990"	4:50
2.	"Just Another Day"	3:52
Total length:		8:47

=== Videos ===
- Be My Baby
- Complex Tour '89
- Romantic
- Romantic Extra
- 19901108

== In popular culture ==
- Koda Kumi covered "Be My Baby" in her 2010 cover album Eternity: Love & Songs.
- The band was referenced as a pun in episode 24 of Mr. Osomatsu.
- In 2016, the song "Be My Baby" went viral in Japan via an edit featuring Abe Nana and Sato Shin of the Cinderella Girls subseries of Bandai Namco Entertainment's popular Idolmaster franchise.
