= Eriko Hatsune =

Japanese actress (b. 1982)

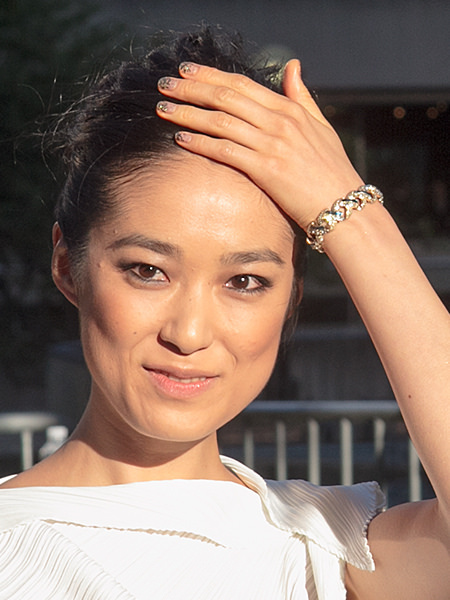
- Hatsune in 2012
- Born: March 24, 1982 (age 43); Tokyo, Japan
- Occupation: Actress
- Years active: 1998–present
- Height: 1.70 m (5 ft 7 in)

Eriko Hatsune (初音映莉子, Hatsune Eriko) is a Japanese actress. Her career began in 1998, when she appeared in several television commercials. At the age of 18, she played the female lead in the 2000 film Uzumaki. She also had a leading role in the 2012 film Emperor.

== Works ==
=== Film ===
Year	Title	Role	Director(s)	Notes
2000	Uzumaki	Kirie Goshima	Higuchinsky	
2000	Oshikiri	Mio	Zenboku Sato	
2000	The Hanging Balloons	Unknown	Issei Oda	
2001	CROSS	Unknown	Mika Omori	
2002	Bom!	Kyoko	Tsutomu Kashima	
2006	Have a Nice Day	Unknown	Kenji Yamauchi	Segment: "Please, Wake Up"
2007	Apartment 1303	Yukiyo Sugiuchi	Ataru Oikawa	
2007	Creep	Unknown	Kō Sakai	
2010	Norwegian Wood	Hatsumi	Tran Anh Hung	
2011	Being Mitsuko	Mitsuko Shinozaki	Kenji Yamauchi (2)	
2012	Girls for Keeps	Unknown	Yoshihiro Fukagawa	
2012	Emperor	Aya Shimada	Peter Webber	
2013	Gatchaman	Naomi / Berg Katze	Toya Sato	
2014	All-Round Appraiser Q: The Eyes of Mona Lisa	Misa Ryusenji	Shinsuke Sato	
2014	25 NIJYU-GO	Johnny Wong's Woman	Tsutomu Kashima (2)	
2017	Moon and Thunder	Yasuko	Hiroshi Ando	
2018	The Lies She Loved	Unknown	Kazuhito Nakae	
2019	We Are Little Zombies	Kuriko Eguchi	Makoto Nagahisa	
2024	A Complete Unknown	Toshi Seeger	James Mangold	

=== Television ===
Year	Title	Role	Notes
1999	Labyrinth	Miwa Kurasawa	All episodes
2000	From the Heart	Chihiro Nishizaki	All episodes
2000	Long Dream	Kana Sakurai	Television film
2000	Match Point!	Unknown	All episodes
2001	Love Is Justice	Asami	Episode: "1.8"
2002	Transparent	Ito Keiko	All episodes
2006	A Symphony of Us	Ruriko Iwamizawa	6 episodes
2010	Iryū: Team Medical Dragon	Kitagawa Hibiki	9 episodes
2011	Control: Criminal Psychology	Azuma Yumika	2 episodes
2011	Sunshine	Keiko Miyashita	11 episodes
2012	Victory After Defeat - Shigeru Yoshida: The Man Who Created Postwar Japan	Keiko Hino	Episode: "#1.1"
2015	Find Me	Unknown	All episodes
2017	Dr. Storks	Toko Takayama	3 episodes

=== Stage ===
Year	Title	Role	Venue
2015	Under Execution, Under Jailbreak	Woman	The Galaxy Theatre (Shinagawa)

=== Video Games ===
Year	Title	Role	Notes
2003	Drakengard	Furiae	Voice

== Notes ==
=== References ===
- Kalat, David (2007). J-horror: The Definitive Guide to The Ring, The Grudge and Beyond. Vertical. ISBN 978-1932234084.
