= Higuchinsky =

Ukrainian-born film director

- Born: Akihiro Higuchi; 1969; Ukraine
- Occupation: Film director

Akihiro Higuchi (born 1969), also known by the alias Higuchinsky, is a Ukrainian-born film director known for directing the 2000 film Uzumaki, an adaptation of the manga of the same name by Junji Ito. Higuchinsky also directed Long Dream, a 2000 television film adaptation of Nagai Yume, another story by Ito. Additionally, Higuchinsky directed the 2003 film Tokyo 10+01, and helmed an episode of a television series adaptation of the manga Eko Eko Azarak.

== Bibliography ==
- Edwards, Matthew (2017). Twisted Visions: Interviews with Cult Horror Filmmakers. McFarland & Company. ISBN 978-1476663760.
