= Kōji Kikkawa =

Japanese musician (born 1965)

- 吉川晃司
- Born: August 18, 1965 (age 61); Fuchū, Hiroshima, Japan
- Occupations: Singer; musician; actor
- Years active: 1984–present
- Musical career
- Genres: J-pop; kayōkyoku; rock
- Instruments: Vocals; guitar
- Label: SMS Records (1984–1988); Toshiba EMI (1989–1996); Polydor (1997–1999); kitty mme (2000); Tokuma Japan (2002–2008); Universal Music Japan (2009–2012); Warner Music Japan (2012–present)
- Member of: Ooochie Koochie
- Formerly of: Complex
- Website: www.kikkawa.com

Kōji Kikkawa (吉川 晃司, Kikkawa Kōji; born August 18, 1965) is a Japanese singer, musician and actor. His most recent album is 2022's Over the Nine.

Kōji was born in Hiroshima and his music career began on February 1, 1984, with "Monica" (later remade in Cantonese sung by Leslie Cheung) and he won eight music awards in the same year. After taking a short break in 1988, he came back as a lead singer in the band Complex with Tomoyasu Hotei (former guitarist of Boøwy) and "Be My Baby" was released. Complex remained as one of the most popular bands in Japan until 1990, when it was announced that Complex had disbanded.

After "Complex", Kōji released series of hit singles such as "Setsunasa O Korosenai", "Kiss Ni Utarete Nemuritai" and "Boy's Life". Kōji completed a "20th Anniversary Tour" at Budokan on February 1, 2005.

In 2006 he recorded "One World," the theme for the 2006 motion picture Kamen Rider Kabuto: God Speed Love. More recently, he had teamed up with popular Japanese DJ TWINS to release a single "Juicy Jungle". Also, DJ TWINS had released an album with remixes of several of Kōji's previous hits.

With this new sound-disco revisit, Kōji redefined himself like he does year after year. Throughout all his career, it could be considered that Kōji had outgrown from an idol to an artiste that explore the music boundary. He writes his own songs, produced and arranged his own albums and also played most of the instruments in it. He had just released a remix album of his old hits-titled-DISCO K2. In April 2007, a new single "BABY JANE" was released.

He portrayed Sokichi Narumi/Kamen Rider Skull in the Kamen Rider W franchise from 2009 to 2010, and sung "Nobody's Perfect," Skull's theme.

In 2011, Kōji and Tomoyasu Hotei reunited as Complex for two concerts at the Tokyo Dome to benefit victims of the Tohoku earthquake and tsunami. The duo had not performed together as Complex for almost 21 years.

In 2017, Koji's single "SAMURAI ROCK" was used theme for the J-Sports broadcast of 2017 World Baseball Classic.

In 2024, 13 years later, Kikkawa and Hotei reunited again for another Complex benefit concert at the Tokyo Dome, this time to benefit the victims of the 2024 Noto earthquake.

In 2025, Kikkawa formed the unit Ooochie Koochie with Tamio Okuda.

== Filmography ==
=== Film ===
Year	Title	Role	Notes	Ref.
1984	Sukanpin Walk	Yuji Tamikawa	Lead role	
1985	You Gotta Chance	Yuji Tamikawa	Lead role	
1986	Take It Easy	Yuji Tamikawa	Lead role	
1988	Shatterer	Koichi Honda	Lead role	
2000	The City of Lost Souls	Fushimi		
2000	The Guys from Paradise	Kōhei Hayasaka	Lead role	
2004	Lady Joker	Shuhei Handa		
2005	Until the Lights Come Back	Gingi		
2007	Three for the Road	Seijuro		
2008	The Glorious Team Batista	Kyoichi Kiryu		
2009	Kamen Rider × Kamen Rider W & Decade: Movie War 2010	Sokichi Narumi		
2010	Kamen Rider × Kamen Rider OOO & W Featuring Skull: Movie War Core	Sokichi Narumi		
2010	Wararaifu!!	Shuichi's Dad		
2010	Sword of Desperation	Hayatonosho Obiya		
2012	Rurouni Kenshin	Udō Jin-e		
2015	Blowing in the Winds of Vietnam	Himself		
2016	Dangerous Cops: Final 5 Days	Kyoichi Garcia		
2016	The Top Secret: Murder in Mind	Kiyotaka Kainuma		
2019	A Town and a Tall Chimney	Yoshinosuke Kihara		
2023	Kingdom 3: The Flame of Destiny	Pang Nuan		
2024	Doraemon: Nobita's Earth Symphony	Maestro Vento (voice)		
2024	Kingdom 4: Return of the Great General	Pang Nuan		
2025	Trillion Game: The Movie	Kazuki Kedōin		

=== Television ===
Year	Title	Role	Notes	Ref.
2009	Tenchijin	Oda Nobunaga	Taiga drama	
2010	Kamen Rider W	Sokichi Narumi		
2010	Sunao ni Narenakute	Ryōsuke Nakajima		
2013	Yae's Sakura	Saigō Takamori	Taiga drama	
2013	Gifū Dōdō!! Kanetsugu to Keiji	Narrator		
2015–18	Downtown Rocket	Michio Zaizen	2 seasons	
2017–18	Guardian of the Spirit	Jiguro		
2018	Black Lecture Hall's Rokubee	Rokubee Montoya	Lead role	
2019	MAGI Tensho Keno Shonen Shisetsu	Oda Nobunaga		
2020	Detective Yuri Rintaro	Yuri Rintaro	Lead role	
2022	DCU: Deep Crime Unit	Atsushi Nariai		
2022–23	Maiagare!	Mamoru Ōkōchi	Asadora	
2023	Trillion Game	Kazuki Kedōin		
2024	Acma: Game	Seiji Oda		

=== Music video ===
Year	Title	Notes	Ref.
2002	Pandoora		

Preceded by The Good-Bye, Sayuri Iwai, Yasuko Kuwata	Shinjuku Music Festival for Gold Prize; 1984 (with : Yukiko Okada)	Succeeded by Shigeyuki Nakamura, Minako Honda
