= Hinako Saeki =

Japanese actress (born 1977)

- Born: February 16, 1977 (age 49); Yamatokoriyama, Nara, Japan
- Occupation: Actress
- Years active: 1994–present
- Website: http://www.nifty.com/hinako/

Hinako Saeki (佐伯 日菜子, Saeki Hinako) is a Japanese actress who was born on February 16, 1977, in Nara, Japan. Probably her best-known role was as Sadako Yamamura in Spiral, the 1998 sequel to the horror film Ring.

She has also appeared in a handful of other popular Japanese horror films including Uzumaki (2000) which was based on a Junji Ito manga of the same name, and Eko Eko Azaraku: Misa the Dark Angel (1998). In addition, she played a featured role as the character Colonel in Mamoru Oshii's Assault Girls (2009). She also portrayed in Ultraman X as the Underground Woman/Ryoko Mabuse.

She is also familiar in China for her role as Sadako in the sequel to the Hong Kong TV drama series, My Date with a Vampire II.

== Personal life ==
She was previously married to football player Daisuke Oku, though that marriage ended in divorce. He died in a traffic collision on October 17, 2014.

== Filmography ==
=== Films ===
- It's a Summer Vacation Everyday (1994)
- A Quiet Life (1995)
- Eko Eko Azaraku: Misa the Dark Angel (1998)
- Spiral (1998) as Sadako Yamamura
- Uzumaki (2000)
- Assault Girls(2009)
- Aesop's Game (2019)
- Kamaishi Ramen Monogatari (2023)
- Nightmare Resort (2023)
- Confetti (2024)
- Stigmatized Properties: Possession (2025)

=== Television ===
- Eko Eko Azarak (1997)
- My Date with a Vampire II (2000) as Sadako
- Sand Whale and Me (2017) as KFC
