= Hiroyuki Nakano =

Japanese film director (born 1958)

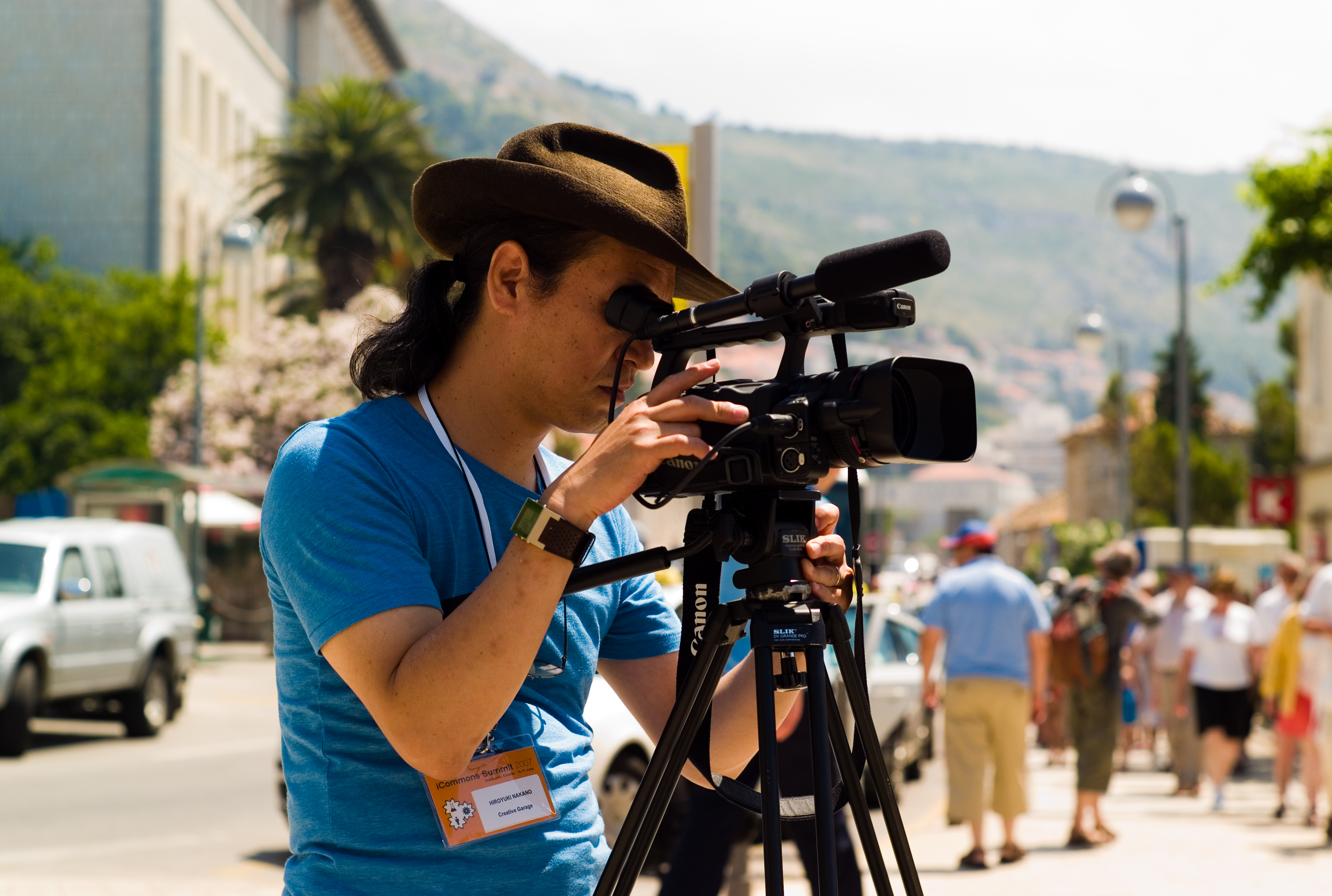
Hiroyuki Nakano in Croatia at iCommons Summit 2007

Hiroyuki Nakano (中野裕之, Nakano Hiroyuki; born 1958 in Fukuyama, Hiroshima, Japan) is a Japanese film director.

== Filmography ==
- Watching People (1989)
- Spiritual Earth: Aloha Wave (1995)
- Samurai Fiction (1998)
- Pop Group Killers (2000)
- Red Shadow (2001)
- Stereo Future (2001)
- Slow Is Beautiful (2003)
- Return (2003)
- Tajomaru (2009)
- FOOL COOL ROCK (2014)

== Music videos ==
- Groove Is in the Heart by Deee-Lite (1990)
