= Sousuke Takaoka =

Japanese actor (born 1982)

- 高岡蒼佑
- Born: Sousuke Takaoka; 8 February 1982 (age 44); Tokyo, Japan
- Occupations: Boxer; Martial Artist; actor (formerly)
- Years active: 1999–2020
- Agents: Flying Box (2001 - 2006) Stardust Promotion (2006 - 2011) NowHere; (2011 - 2020)
- Spouse: Aoi Miyazaki (m. 2007; div. 2011)

Sousuke Takaoka (高岡蒼佑, Takaoka Sōsuke; born February 8, 1982) is a Japanese former actor, known for his break-out performance in the controversial movie Battle Royale.

== Career ==
His break-out performance was in the controversial movie Battle Royale, in which he played the pacifistic Hiroki Sugimura (Boy #11). Takaoka then moved from muted heroics to active anti-heroism in portrayals of the grittier side of teenage violence, such as in Concrete. The film was based on the events of Junko Furuta's sadistic murder by four youths in 1988.

In 2006, for his role as the introspective Honda in Spring Snow, Takaoka gained a Best Supporting Actor nomination at the Blue Ribbon Awards, a Japanese film event judged by critics.

Takaoka quit acting in 2020 and is now working as a martial artist. He also took part-time jobs such as a trash collector and at an izakaya prior to his martial arts career.

== Public image ==
In July 2011, Takaoka made headlines and attracted much controversy for several comments against the airing of Korean dramas on Japanese television. He stated on Twitter "I used to be indebted to Fuji TV in the past, but now I'm suspicious that they may actually be a Korean network. I'm questioning about what country I'm in as well. It offends me. If anything related to Korea is on broadcast, I just turn the TV off. It troubles me because I feel like I am being brainwashed", and "Since we're in Japan, I would like to see Japanese programs. I get scared every time I hear the word, 'Hallyu'". His comments resulted in a strong public backlash due to his previous role as a Zainichi Korean in the film Break Through! as well as public protests against the airing of Korean dramas against Fuji TV. Due to the controversy about his statements, he was reportedly dropped from his agency following his tweets, and his marriage to Aoi Miyazaki, whom he stated shared his views, was reportedly in jeopardy. However, he later apologized for his statements and retracted his claims of Miyazaki sharing his views.

== Personal life ==
On June 15, 2007, he married fellow actress Aoi Miyazaki, after being in a relationship for seven years. In December 2011, the couple had announced that they were divorcing. On August 3, 2020, he announced his retirement from acting. In 2021, he then became a boxer.

He also has a YouTube channel and uploads vlogs, as well as highlights from his boxing tournaments.

== Filmography ==
- Battle Royale as Hiroki Sugimura (2000)
- Akashia no michi (2001)
- Red Shadow (2001)
- Blue Spring (2001)
- Blue as Manabu Mizuuchi (2002)
- 17-sai (2003)
- Spirit (2004)
- Concrete as Tatsuo Oosugi (2004)
- Break Through! as An-sung Lee (2004)
- Tetsujin 28: The Movie (2005)
- Spring Snow as Shigekuni Honda (2005)
- Sugar and Spice as Yano (2006)
- How to Become Myself (Ashita no watashi no tsukurikata) as Hiroyuki Tamura (2007)
- Heat Island (Hîto Airando) (2007)
- Crows Zero as Izaki Shun (2007)
- Roulette in the Blue Sky (Aozora no ruretto) (2007)
- GS Wonderland (2008)
- Rookies the Movie: Graduation (Rookies: Sotsugyô) (2009)
- Crows Zero 2 (Kurôzu zero II) (2009)
- Be Sure to Share (Chanto Tsutaeru) (2009)
- Saru Lock The Movie (2010)
- Sankaku (2010)
- Zatoichi: The Last (2010)
- 13 Assassins (2010)
- What a Wonderful Life!! (Wararaifu!!) (2011)
- Bokura ga Ita as Masafumi Takeuchi (2012)
- Dare to Stop Us as Nagisa Oshima (2018)
- Silent Night (2025)

== TV ==
- Taiyō no Kisetsu (2002) (Season of the Sun) (2002)
- Proof of the Man (Ningen no Shomei) (Fuji TV / 2004)
- Slow Dance (Fuji TV / 2005)
- Tokyo Tower (2007)
- Kaze no hate (NHK / 2007)
- Mop Girl (Moppu Gāru) (TV Asahi / 2007)
- The Negotiator (TV Asahi / 2008)
- Rookies (TBS / 2008)
- Saru Lock (NTV / 2009)
- Real Clothes (Riaru kurôzu) (Fuji TV / 2009)
- The Negotiator 2 (Koshonin 2) (TV Asahi / 2009)

== Theatre work ==
Takaoka is also a stage actor and appeared in The Lieutenant of Inishmore (Wee Thomas) by Martin McDonagh in June 2006.

- Pilgrim (2003)
- Bent (2004)
