= List of Olympic venues in rowing =

For the Summer Olympics, there are 28 venues that have been or will be used for rowing. These venues have occurred at lakes, rivers, shipping canals, and their own specialized courses. The first specialized course took place at 1932 and would serve as a model for other Olympic venues, most notably in 1972, 1976, 1980, 2000, 2004, 2008 and 2012.

Games	Venue	Other sports hosted at venues for those games	Capacity	Ref.
1900 Paris	Seine	Swimming, Water polo	Not listed.	
1904 St. Louis	Creve Coeur Lake	None	Not listed.	
1908 London	Henley Royal Regatta	None	Not listed.	
1912 Stockholm	Djurgårdsbrunnsviken	Diving, Modern pentathlon (swimming), Swimming, Water polo	Not listed.	
1920 Antwerp	Brussels–Scheldt Maritime Canal	None	Not listed.	
1924 Paris	Bassin d'Argentuil	None	2,216	
1928 Amsterdam	Sloten	None	2,230	
1932 Los Angeles	Long Beach Marine Stadium	None	17,000	
1936 Berlin	Berlin-Grünau Regatta Course	Canoeing	19,000	
1948 London	Henley Royal Regatta	Canoeing	Not listed.	
1952 Helsinki	Meilahti	None	12,763	
1956 Melbourne	Lake Wendouree	Canoeing	14,300	
1960 Rome	Lake Albano	Canoeing	10,000	
1964 Tokyo	Toda Rowing Course	None	8,300	
1968 Mexico City	Virgilio Uribe Rowing and Canoeing Course	Canoeing	17,600	
1972 Munich	Regattastrecke Oberschleißheim	Canoeing (sprint)	41,000	
1976 Montreal	Notre Dame Island	Canoeing	27,000	
1980 Moscow	Krylatskoye Sports Complex Canoeing and Rowing Basin	Canoeing	21,600	
1984 Los Angeles	Lake Casitas	Canoeing	4,680	
1988 Seoul	Han River Regatta Course/Canoeing Site	Canoeing	25,000	
1992 Barcelona	Lake of Banyoles	None	4,500	
1996 Atlanta	Lake Lanier	Canoeing (sprint)	17,300	
2000 Sydney	Sydney International Regatta Centre	Canoeing (sprint)	20,000	
2004 Athens	Schinias Olympic Rowing and Canoeing Centre	Canoeing (sprint)	14,000	
2008 Beijing	Shunyi Olympic Rowing-Canoeing Park	Canoeing (slalom and sprint), Swimming (marathon)	37,000	
2012 London	Dorney Lake	Canoeing (sprint)	30,000 maximum	
2016 Rio de Janeiro	Lagoa Rodrigo de Freitas	Canoeing (sprint)	14,000	
2020 Tokyo	Sea Forest Waterway	Canoeing (sprint)	24,000	
2024 Paris	Vaires-sur-Marne Nautical Stadium	Canoeing (slalom and sprint)	24,000	
2028 Los Angeles	Long Beach Marine Stadium	Canoeing (sprint)	Not listed.	
2032 Brisbane	TBD	Canoeing (sprint)	14,000	

== Gallery of venues ==
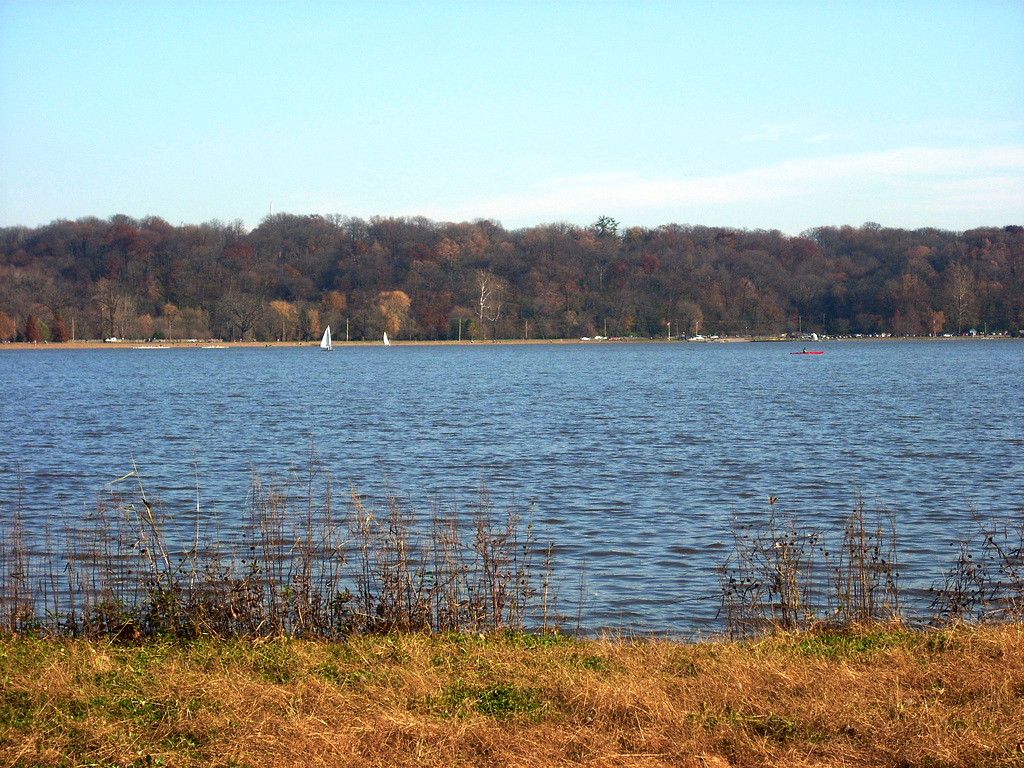
Creve Coeur Lake hosted rowing at the 1904 Summer Olympics in St. Louis.

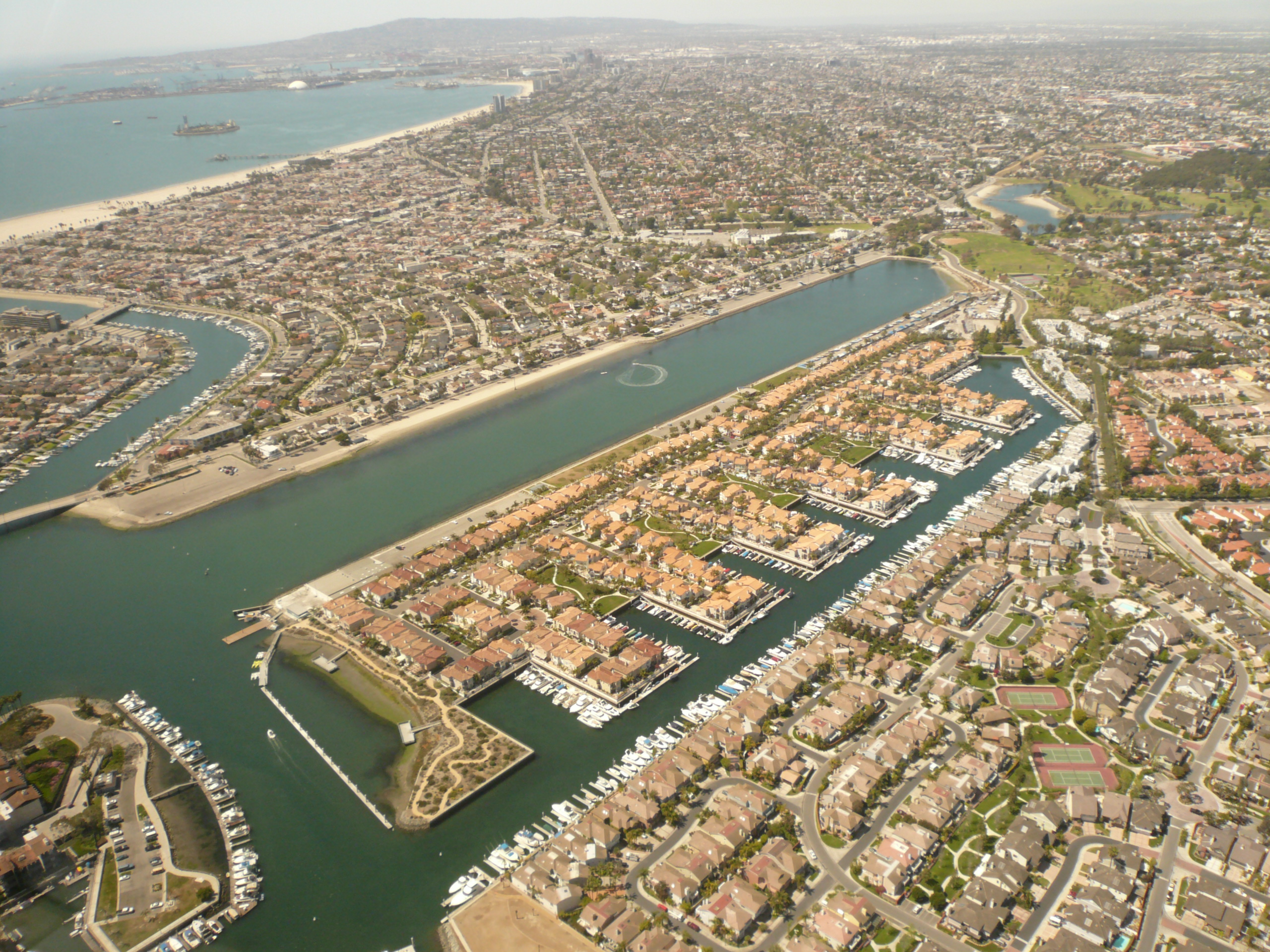
The Long Beach Marine Stadium hosted rowing at the 1932 Summer Olympics in Los Angeles and will host rowing once again at the 2028 Summer Olympics.

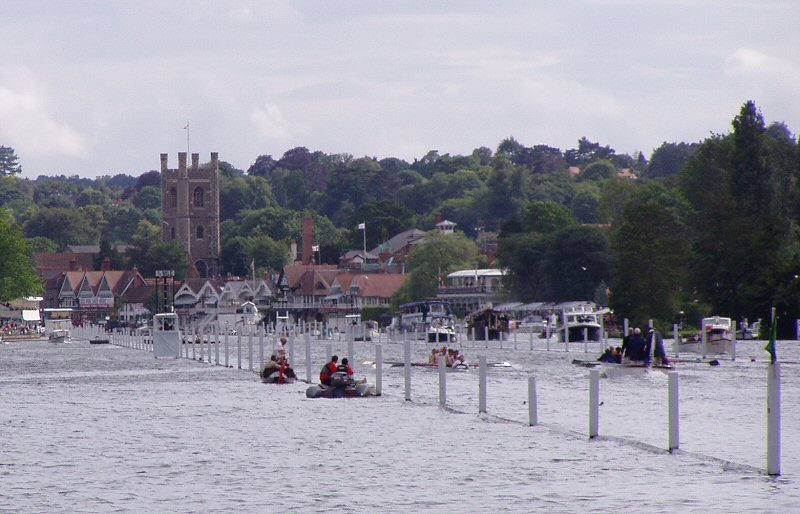
Henley Royal Regatta hosted rowing at the 1948 Summer Olympics in London.

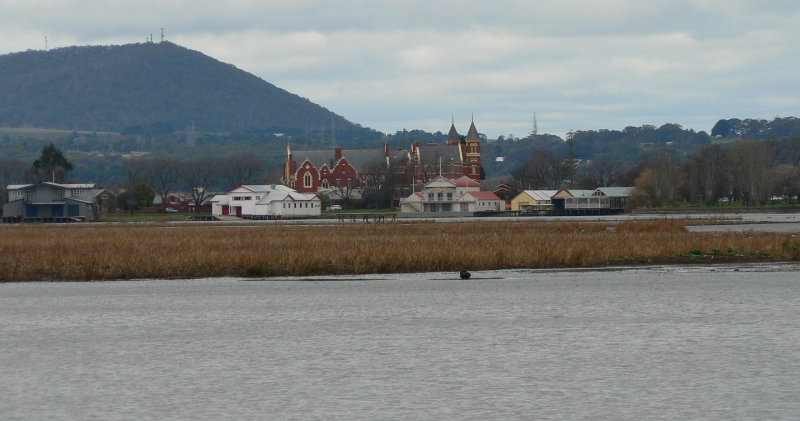
Lake Wendouree hosted rowing at the 1956 Summer Olympics in Melbourne.

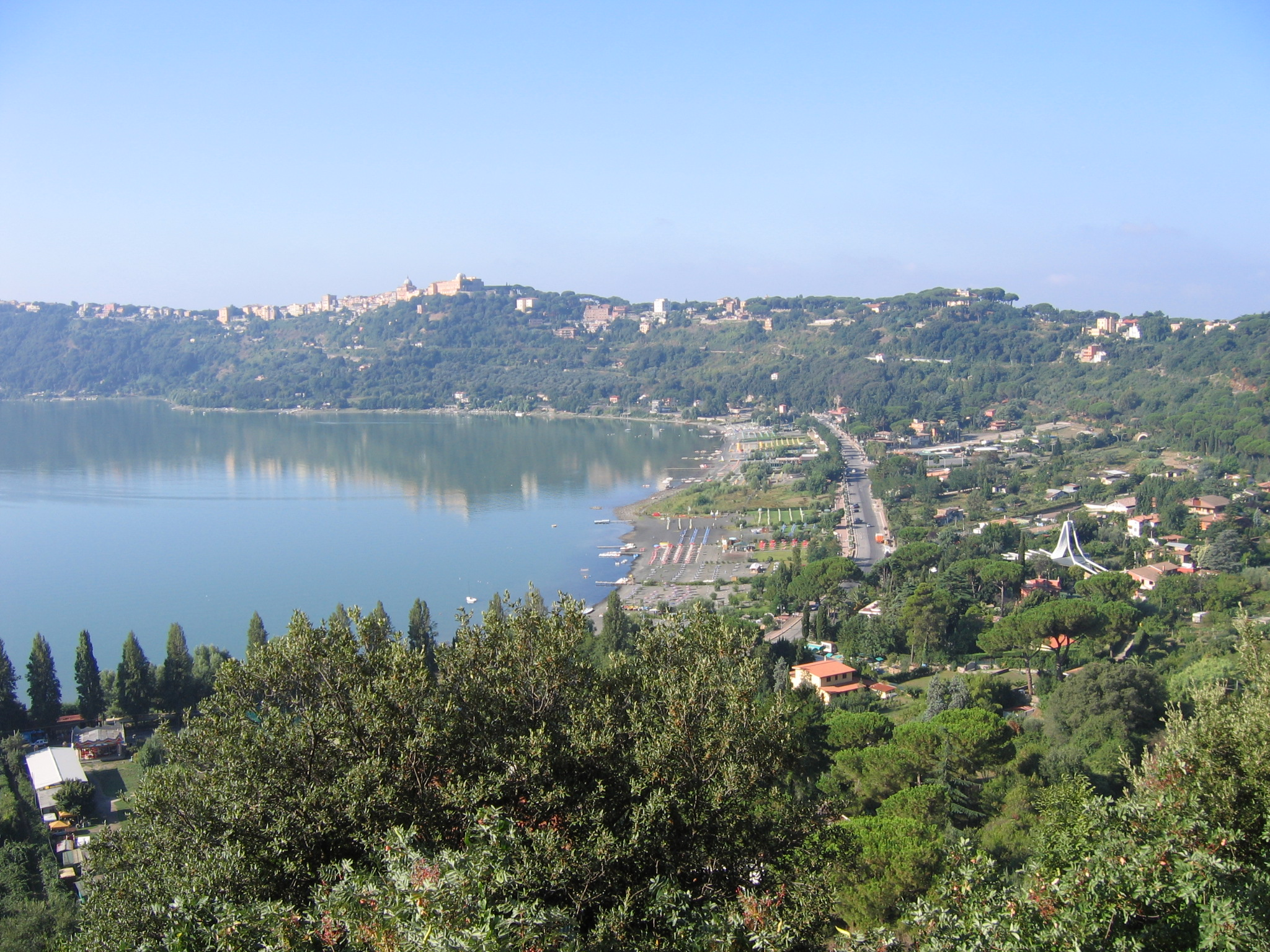
Lake Albano hosted rowing at the 1960 Summer Olympics in Rome.

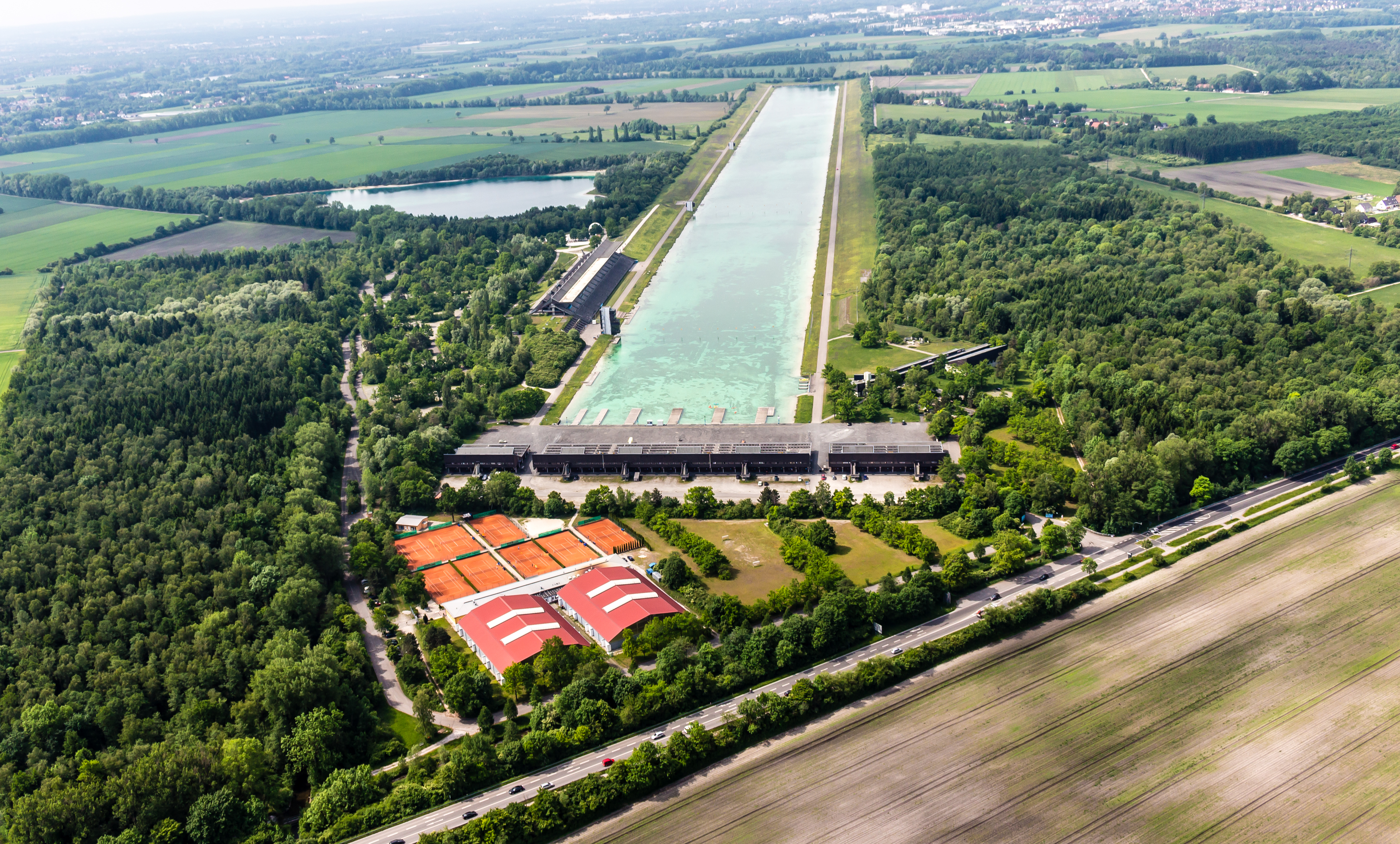
Oberschleißheim Regatta Course hosted rowing at the 1972 Summer Olympics in Munich

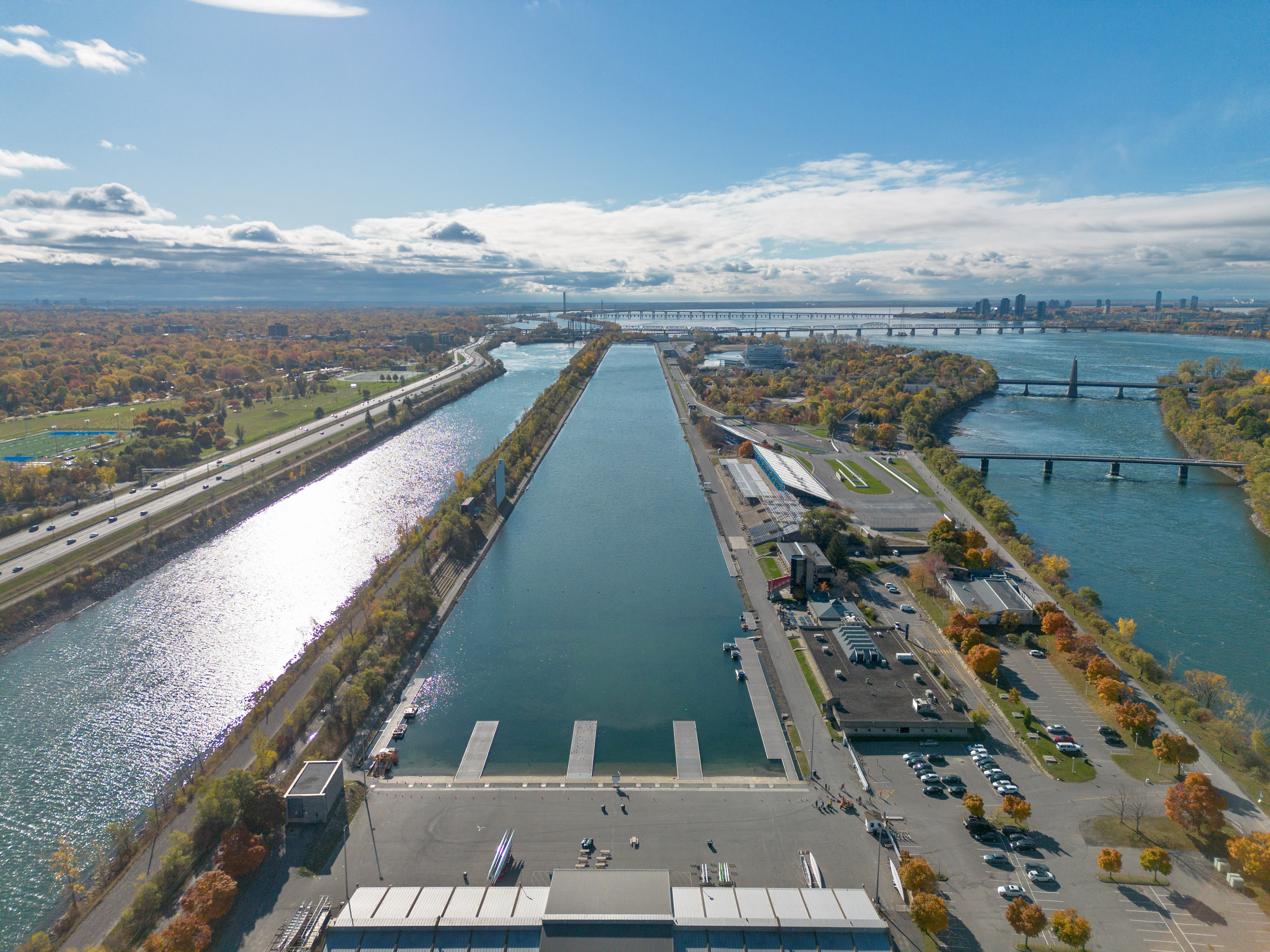
Notre Dame Island hosted rowing at the 1976 Summer Olympics in Montreal.

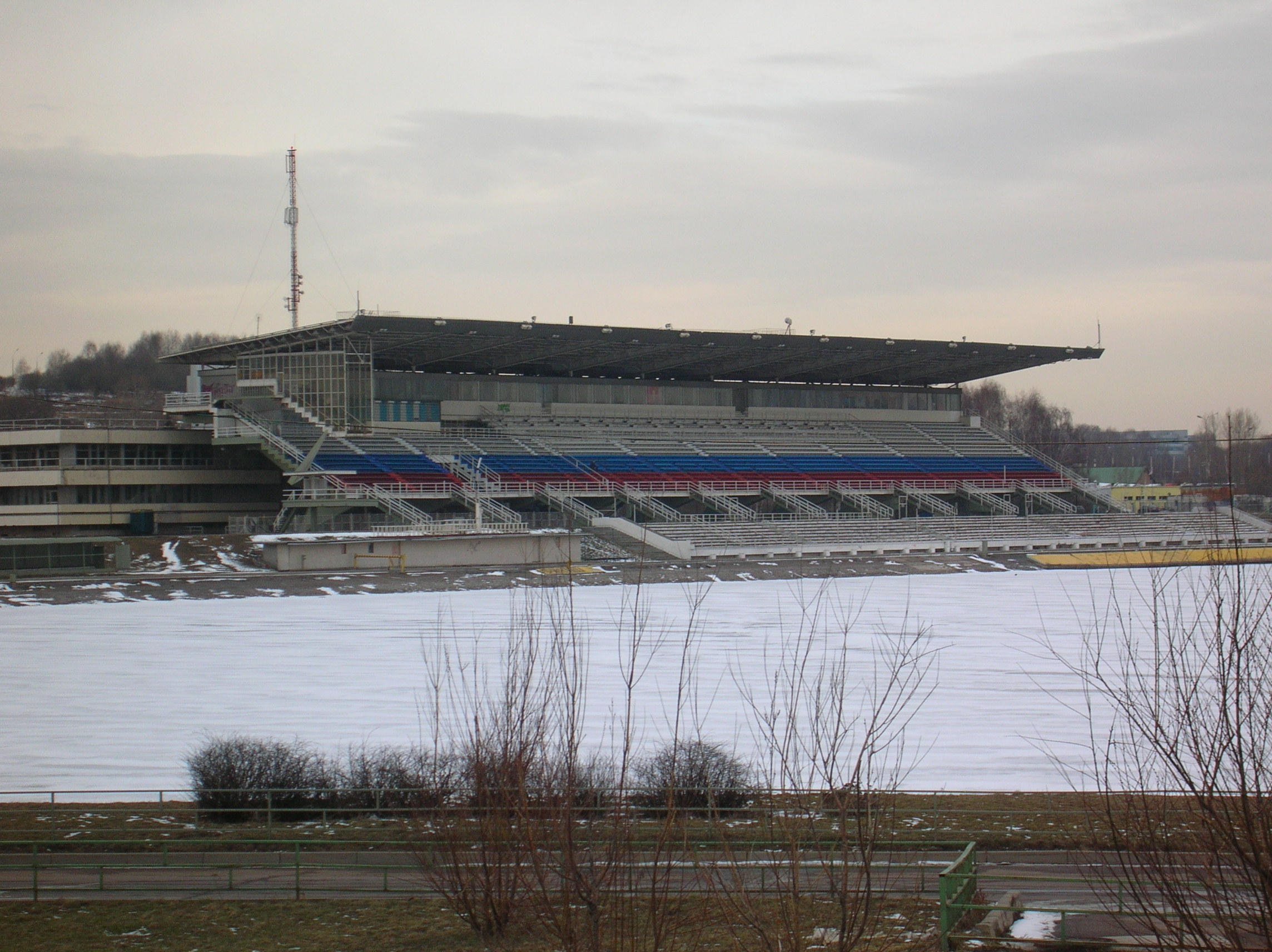
Krylatskoye Rowing Canal hosted rowing at the 1980 Summer Olympics in Moscow.

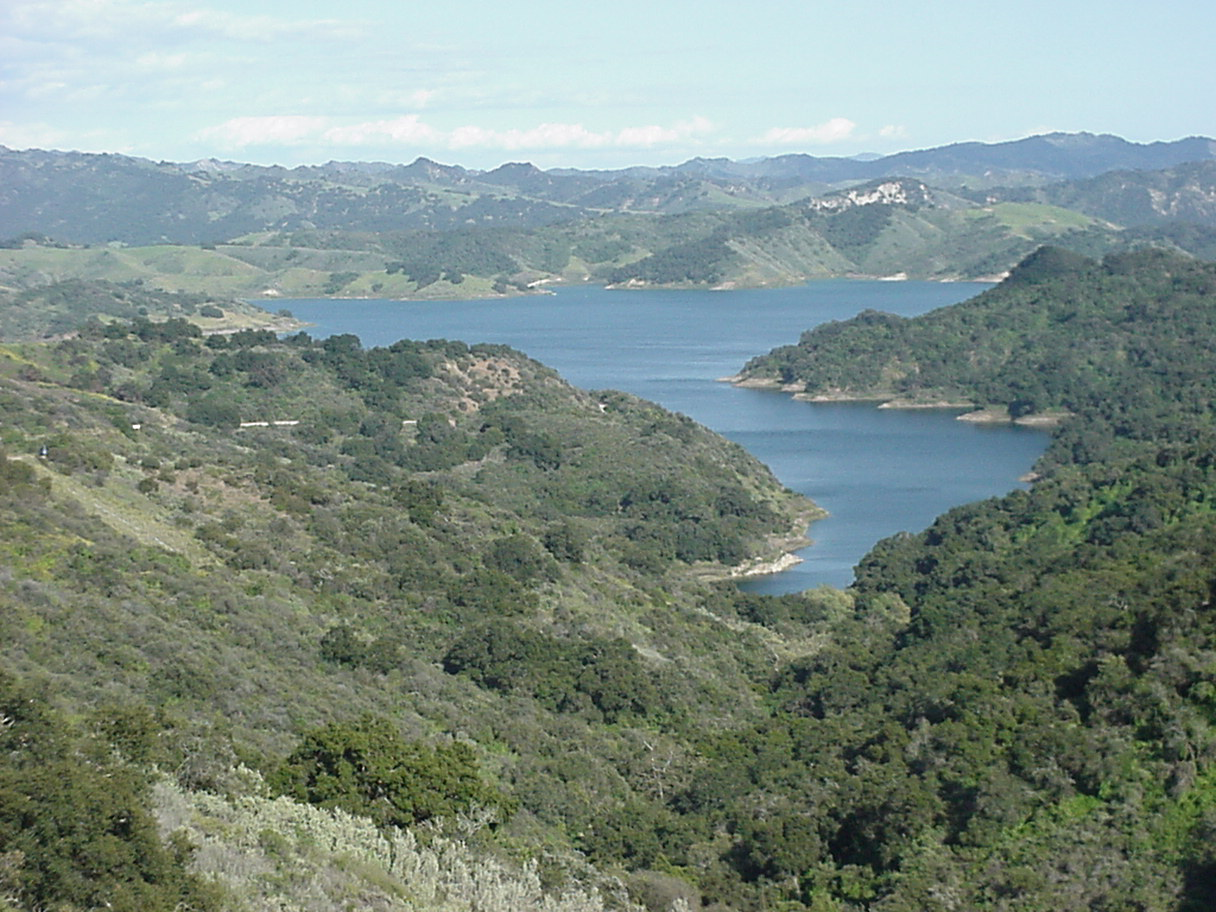
Lake Casitas hosted rowing at the 1984 Summer Olympics in Los Angeles.

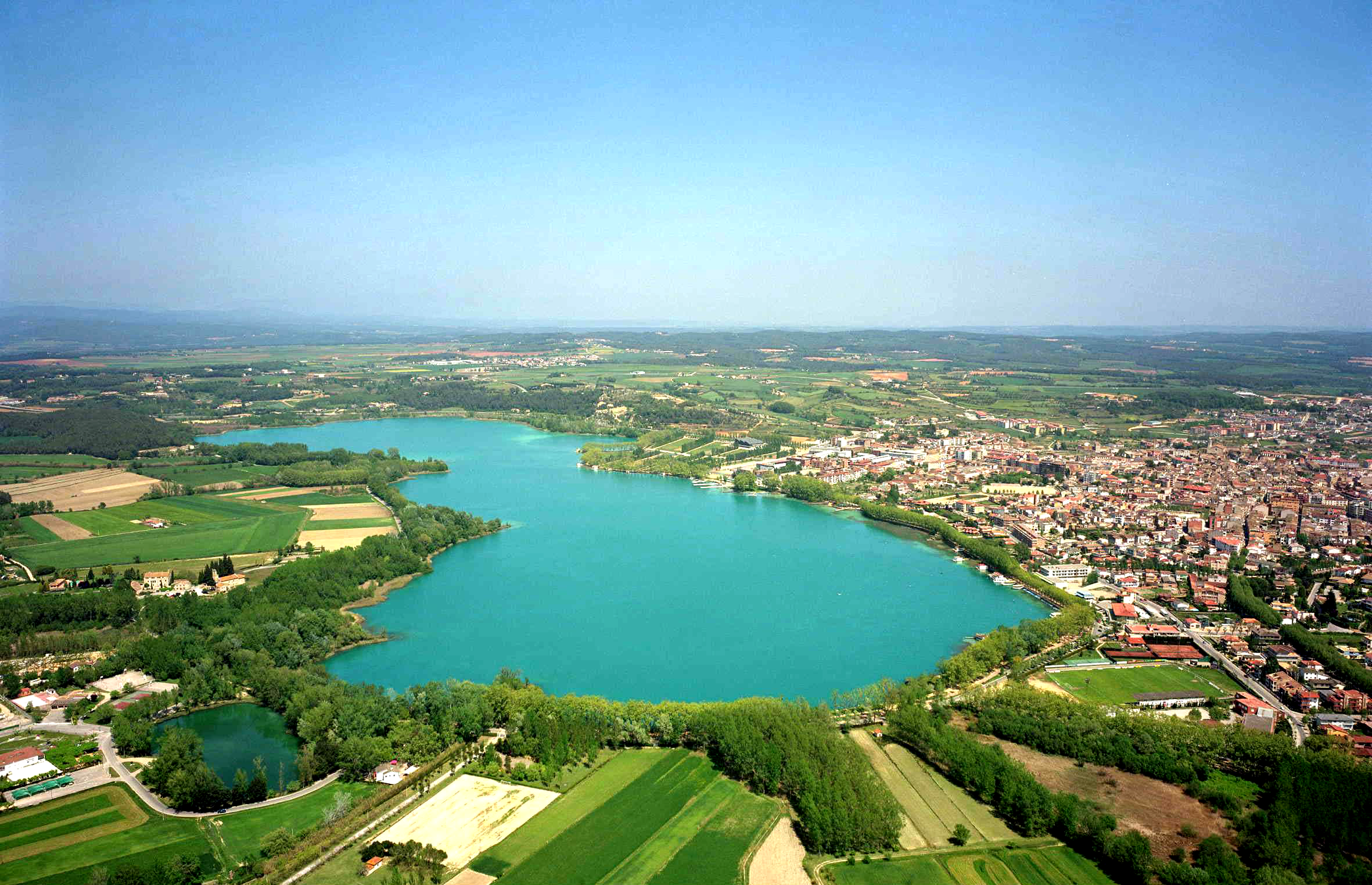
Lake of Banyoles hosted rowing at the 1992 Summer Olympics in Barcelona.

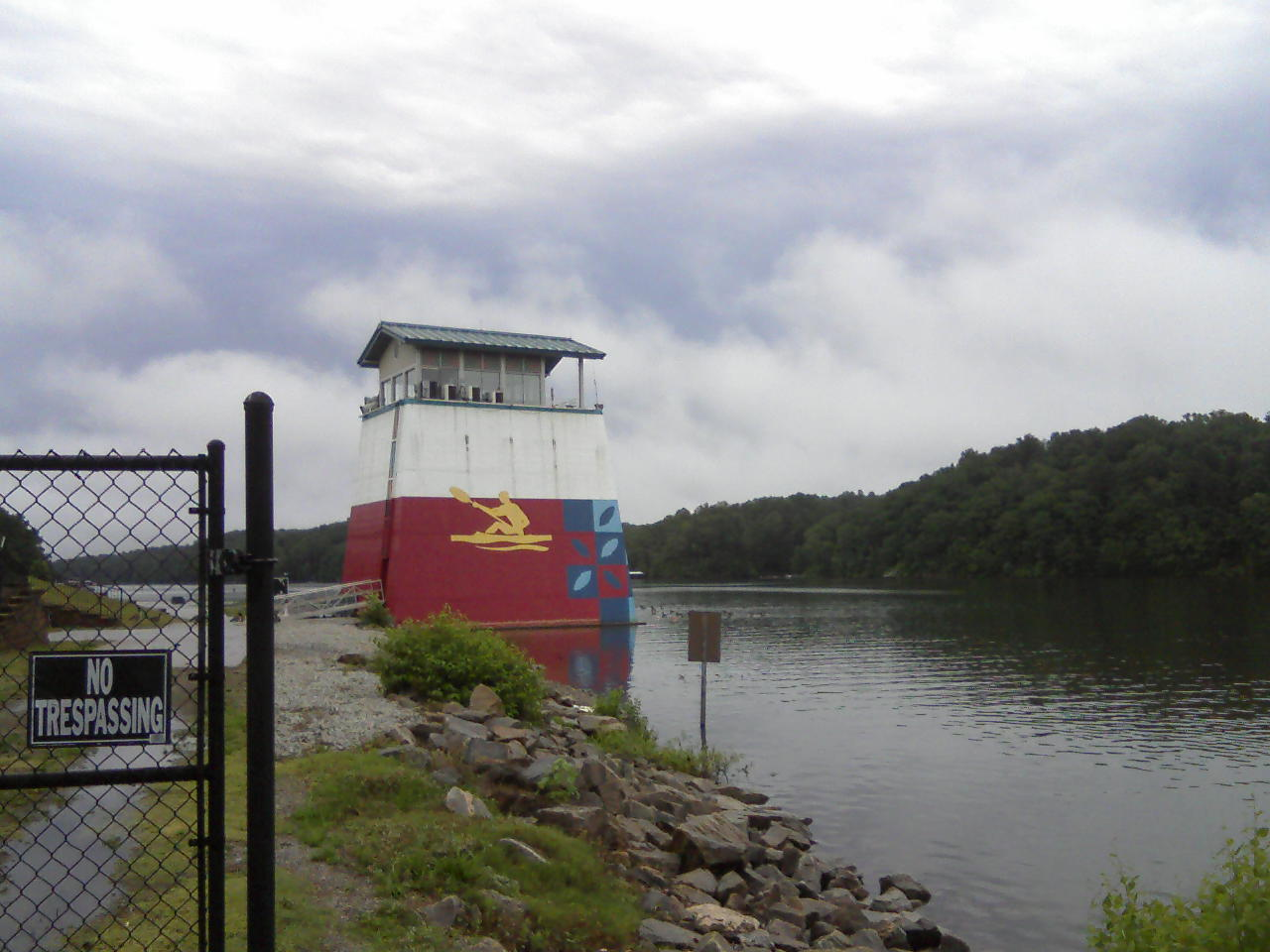
Lake Lanier hosted rowing at the 1996 Summer Olympics in Atlanta.

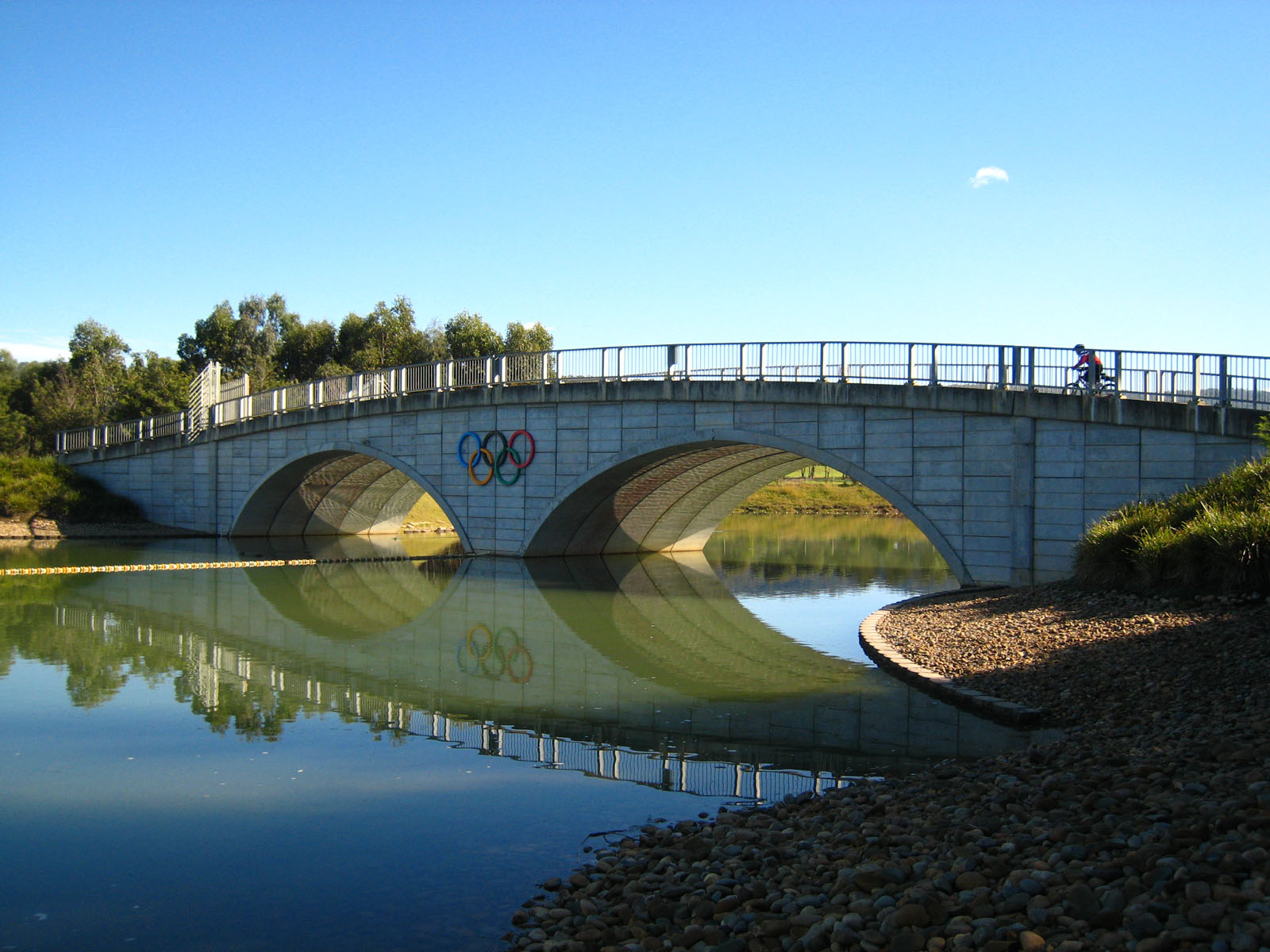
Sydney International Regatta Centre hosted rowing at the 2000 Summer Olympics.

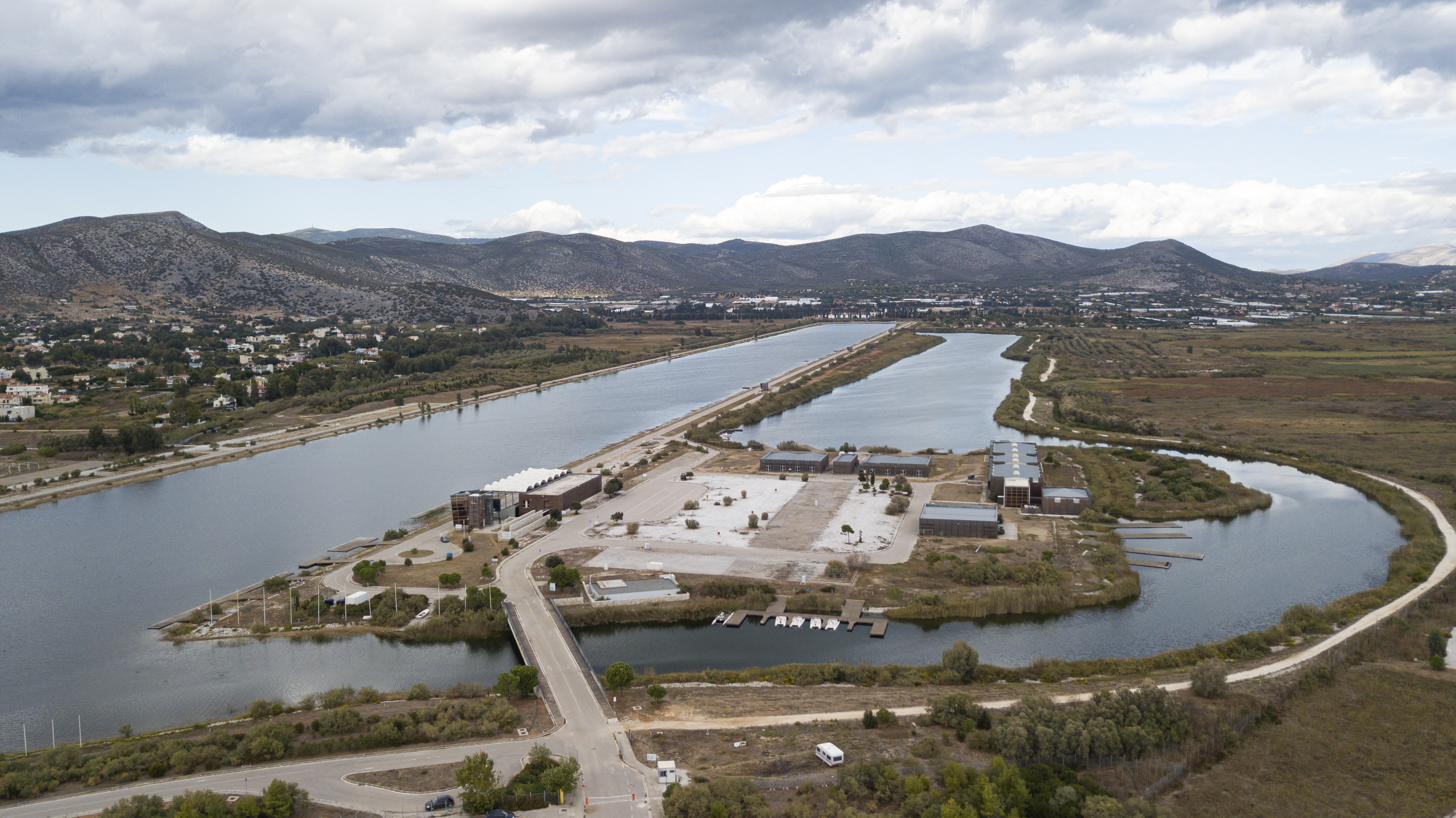
Schinias Olympic Rowing and Canoeing Centre hosted rowing at the 2004 Summer Olympics in Athens.

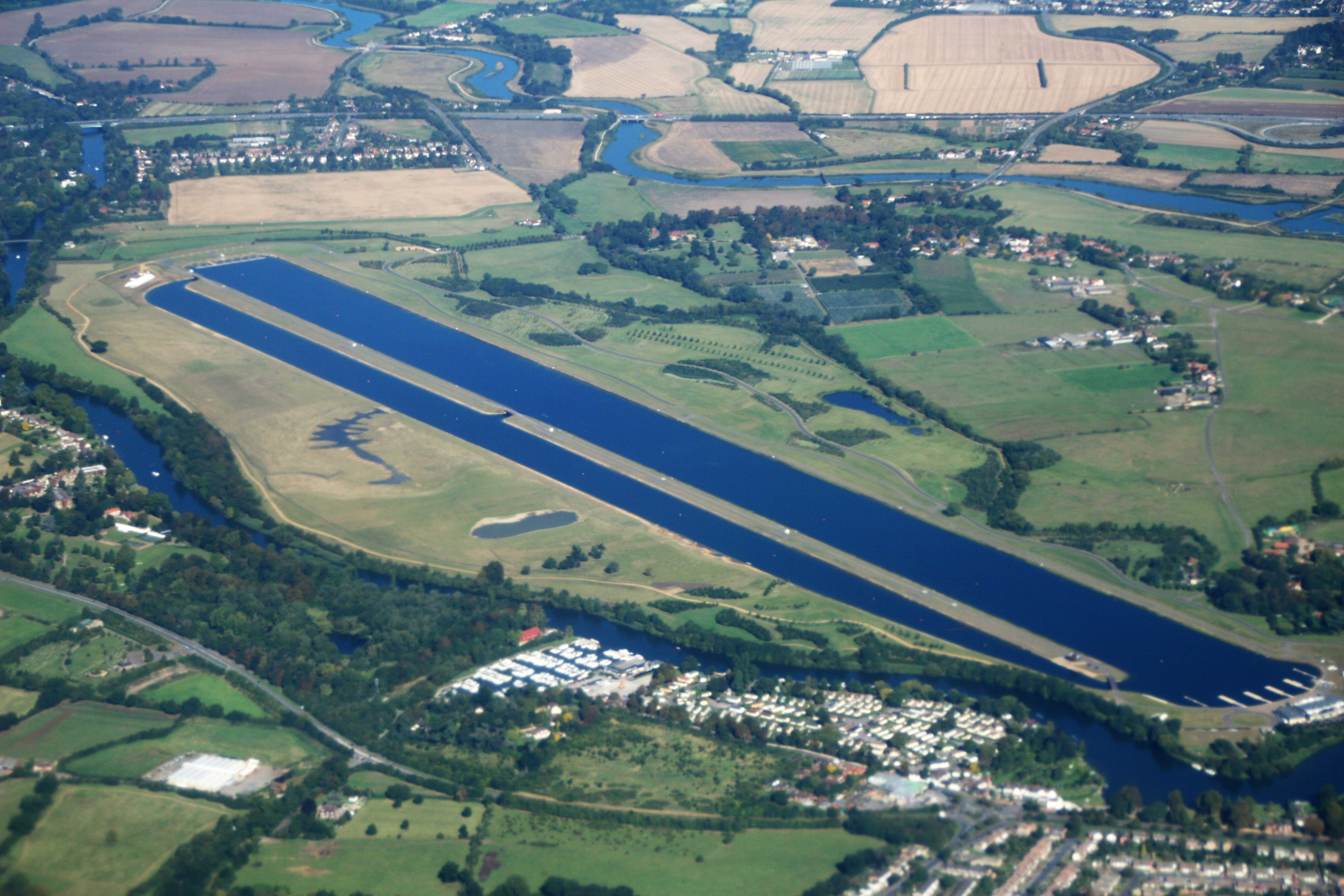
Dorney Lake hosted rowing at the 2012 Summer Olympics in London.

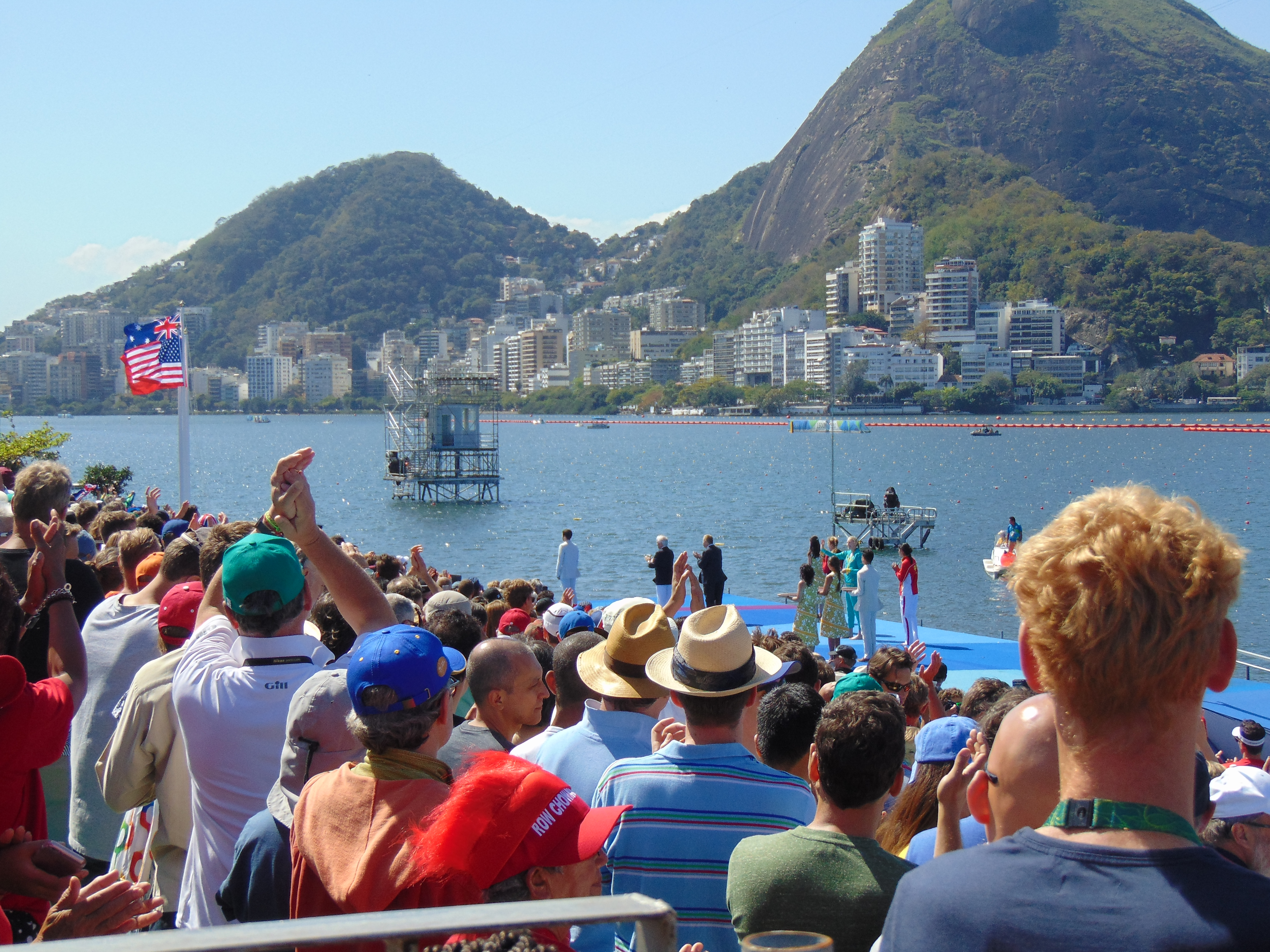
Rodrigo de Freitas Lagoon hosted rowing at the 2016 Summer Olympics in Rio de Janeiro.
