= Wakasu =

Island in Kōtō, Tokyo, Japan

Coordinates: 35°37′N 139°50′E

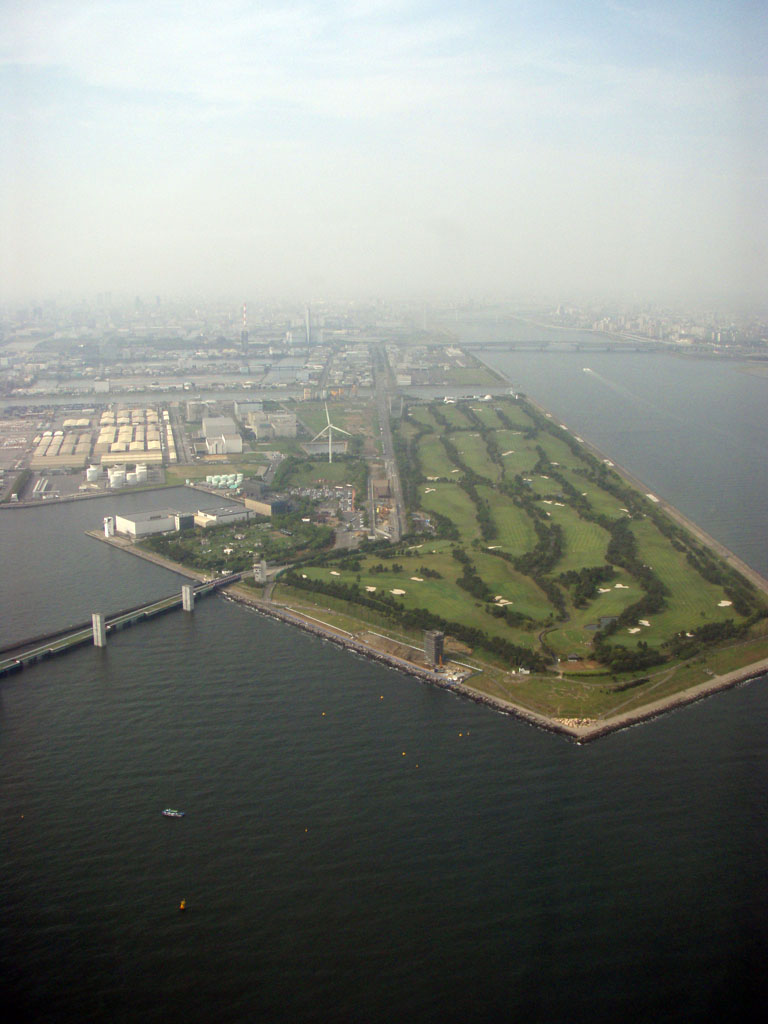
Wakasu Seaside Park

Wakasu (若洲, Wakasu) also known as Wakasu Island, is an island located in Kōtō, Tokyo. It is located south of Shin-Kiba and is connected to a new unnamed island to the south by the Tokyo Gate Bridge.

The island is often associated with the 1989 murder of Junko Furuta, a high school student whose body was located there in a metal drum and completely encased in concrete. The perpetrators were four teenage boys.

== Details ==
Wakasu, like many other areas of Tokyo, is reclaimed land. Save for the camping ground, Wakasu was constructed on a base of incinerator bottom ash remains from garbage, a form of land reclamation common in Japan.

Roughly half of the island is an industrial zone, while the other half contains the Wakasu Seaside Park, Wakasu Golf Course, and a popular camping ground. There is also a large wind turbine located nearby the golf course. The 18-hole golf course and the campground attract many people from all over Tokyo.

Wakasu was planned to be the venue for sailing events at the 2020 Summer Olympics, but the yachting instead took place in Enoshima, Kanagawa Prefecture.

Wakasu is the location where the body of Junko Furuta, the victim of the "1989 concrete-encased high school girl murder case", was discovered after her murder.

== Schools ==
Koto Ward Board of Education operates public elementary and junior high schools.

Minamisuna Elementary School (南砂小学校) is the zoned public elementary school for Wakasu.

Minamisuna Junior High School (南砂中学校) is the zoned public junior high school for Wakasu.
