= Concrete (film) =

2004 Japanese film based on the murder case of Junko Furuta

- Promotional poster
- Directed by: Hiromu Nakamura
- Release date: 3 July 2004 (Japan)
- Country: Japan
- Language: Japanese

Concrete (コンクリート, Konkurīto) also released as Schoolgirl in Cement is a 2004 independently produced Japanese film directed by Hiromu Nakamura. The film is based on the case of the murder of Junko Furuta and it deals as much with the social factors that produced Furuta's four assailants as it does with Furuta's suffering at their hands.

The film involves four boys who kidnap a girl named Misaki. The boys rape, torture, and murder her in a similar manner to the manner of the boys who killed Junko Furuta.

Many people protested the film's release before it even premiered, and it was eventually relegated to specialty theater showings and a DVD release.

== Plot ==
Tatsuo Ōsugi, a troubled working class teenager who frequently assaults his mother for divorcing his father and neglecting him, decides to join the yakuza to raise money for his future marriage with Kayoko Matsuyama after suffering burnout from his low-paying jobs. Despite initially wanting to leave, he is given the opportunity to start a small gang called the Ryujin gang. He then recruits many of his friends to commit crimes like robbery and eventually, rape to please his seniors.

One night, they see a high school student named Misaki going home on her bike. She is knocked over by one of the boys and Tatsuo pretends to take her home. When Misaki tries to go home by herself, Tatsuo reveals his true nature and threatens to burn her house down if she speaks up. Misaki is silenced as she is raped in a hotel and brought to the house of Takao Matsuyama, their friend and Kayoko's brother.

There, the boys insert foreign objects into her vagina, beat her and force her to lie to her parents over the phone that she is staying at her friend's house. Despite the horrific abuses, Misaki finds the courage to escape the house twice, with the help of Takao's mother in the second instance, but is caught and punished by having her leg doused in lighter fluid and burned. Tatsuo punishes Takao's mother by beating her, and threatens the other boys with murder if they express sympathy with Misaki, or help her escape.

After several more instances of abuse, which leaves her incontinent and dehydrated, Misaki begs the boys for water. Tatsuo, however, taunts her and fatally injures her by beating her further and dropping a barbell on her stomach. The gang then leaves the house to relax at a sauna while the dying Misaki expresses her last wish to "stay strong".

After returning from the sauna, the gang discovers that Misaki has succumbed to her injuries, after she is unresponsive to Tatsuo putting a lit cigarette near her nose. He decides to cover up the murder by getting a concrete drum from his old job and burying her body in it. The drum is placed in the open fields.

Eventually, all of the boys are arrested. A detective who had met Tatsuo in one of his prior arrests angrily calls him a "demon seed" for trying to minimize his role in Misaki's murder, by claiming that he did not intend to kill her and only killed one person. The site where Misaki's body is found has now become a gravesite for Misaki as the audience hears her, via a voiceover, asking whether people realize "how precious life is". The film ends with an illusion of a crying Tatsuo in a dark room, as he fails to make a mangled bird fly from his hand.

== Cast ==
- Sousuke Takaoka as Tatsuo Oosugi (大杉辰夫, Ōsugi Tatsuo), the main perpetrator
- Miki Komori as Misaki (美咲), victim of Tatsuo and his gang
- Mika Mifune as Kayoko Matsuyama (松山 佳代子, Matsuyama Kayoko), Tatsuo's girlfriend
- Katsuya Kobayashi as Hiroaki Ozaki (尾崎弘明, Ozaki Hiroaki), Tatsuo's co-perpetrator
- Ryoji Tsuge as Tomomi Ikeda (池田 智巳, Ikeda Tomomi), Tatsuo's co-perpetrator
- Kensuke Mano as Takao Matsuyama (松山 隆男, Matsuyama Takao), Tatsuo co-perpetrator and Kayoko's brother. His house is used as the kidnapping house and the other three force him to do so.
