= Saru Lock =

Japanese manga by Naoki Serizawa

- Cover of the first manga volume

猿ロック (Saru Rokku)
- Genre: Action, Comedy
- Manga
- Written by: Naoki Serizawa
- Published by: Kodansha
- Magazine: Weekly Young Magazine
- Original run: 2003 – 2009
- Volumes: 22
- Television drama
- Directed by: Maeda Tetsu, Tsukamoto Renpei
- Produced by: Amago Daisuke
- Written by: Fukuda Yuichi
- Music by: Yoshioka Shoji
- Original network: NNS (ytv)
- Original run: July 23, 2009 – October 15, 2009
- Episodes: 13
- Live-action film
- Directed by: Tetsu Maeda
- Released: February 27, 2010
- Manga

Saru Lock Reboot
- Written by: Naoki Serizawa
- Published by: Shōnen Gahōsha
- Magazine: Young King Bull
- Original run: October 4, 2018 – June 1, 2026
- Volumes: 10
- Manga

Saitō – Heaven's Crow Fūun Risshi
- Written by: Naoki Serizawa
- Published by: Shōnen Gahōsha
- Magazine: Young King Bull
- Original run: November 4, 2020 – June 4, 2021
- Volumes: 1

Saru Lock (Japanese: 猿ロック, Hepburn: Saru Rokku; trans. Monkey Lock) is a Japanese manga series written and illustrated by Naoki Serizawa. It was adapted into a television drama in 2009 and a live action film in 2010.

A reboot series titled Saru Lock Reboot was serialized in Shonen Gahosha's Young King Bull magazine from October 2018 to June 2026. A spin-off manga series titled Saitō – Heaven's Crow Fūun Risshi was serialized in the same magazine from November 2020 to June 2021.

== Plot ==
Yataro Sarumaru, nicknamed "Saru", is an average high school boy who daydreams about idols but otherwise has no luck with girls. While working with his father, a locksmith in Asakusa, Tokyo, he has gained exceptional skills to pick just about any lock. Using his exceptional skills, Yataro then finds himself solving various mysterious cases, while also trying his luck with the girls.

== Adaptations ==
=== Television drama ===
==== Cast ====
- Hayato Ichihara – Yataro Sarumaru (Saru)
- Sousuke Takaoka – Yamada Jiro
- Sei Ashina – Mizuhara Ritsuko
- Watabe Gota – Yamamoto Kenji

=== Live-action film ===
==== Plot ====
Mayumi (Manami Higa) enlists the help of Yataro Sarumaru (Hayato Ichihara) to open a bank safe deposit box. This results in Yataro fleeing from the police who are in hot pursuit.

==== Cast ====
- Hayato Ichihara – Yataro Sarumaru (Saru) – is a "genius" locksmith who may have cool hands, but is in a perpetual lather, particularly about the opposite sex.
- Manami Higa – Mayumi Shinozaki
- Sousuke Takaoka – Yamada Jiro
- Sei Ashina – Mizuhara Ritsuko
- Watabe Gota – Yamamoto Kenji
- Manami Konishi – Eiko Mizuki

== Reception ==
By March 14, 2010, the film had made US$3,101,844 at the box office.
