= Tokyo Gate Bridge =

Tokyo Gate Bridge 東京ゲートブリッジ
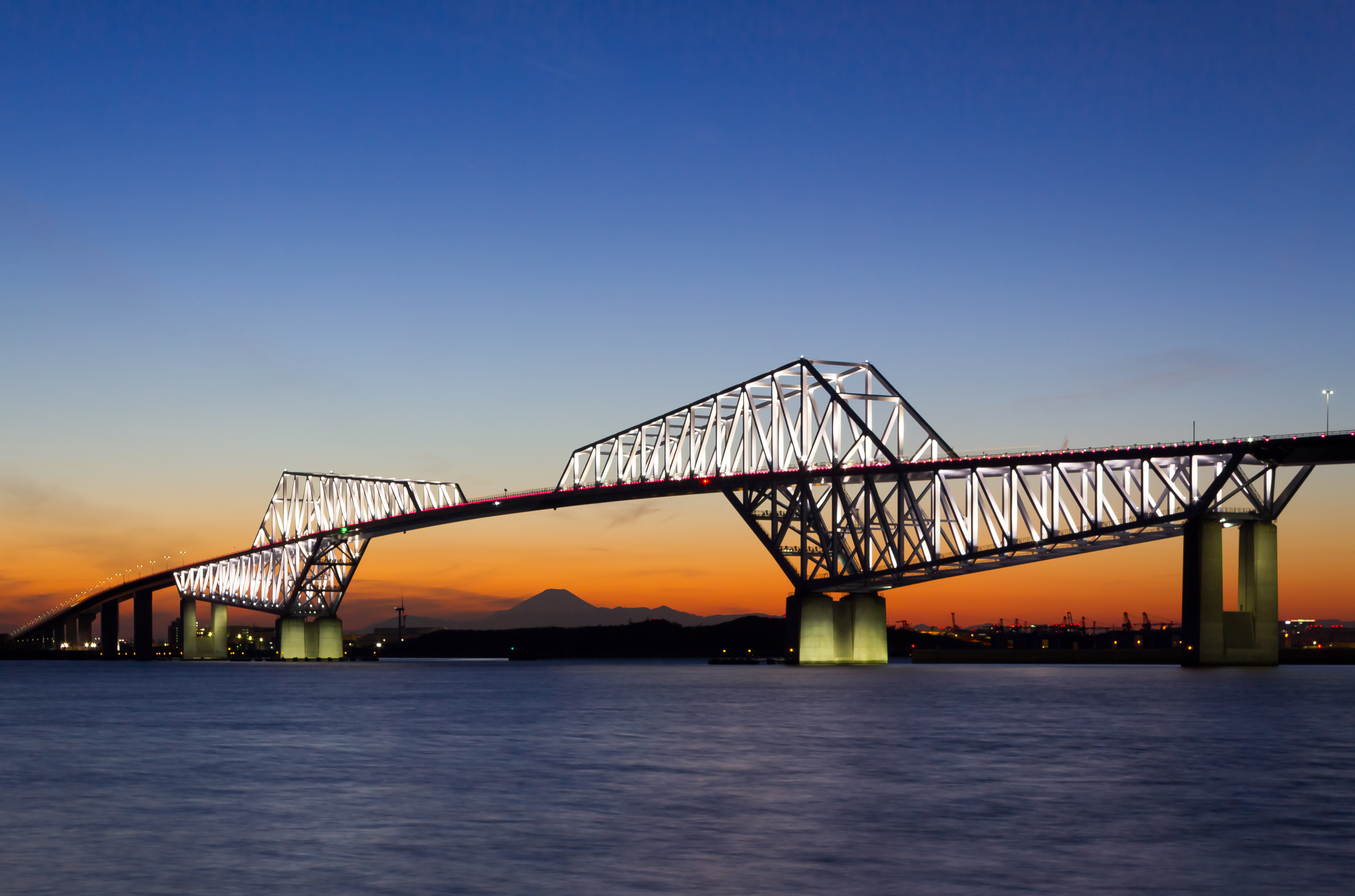
- Tokyo Gate Bridge, January 2015
- Coordinates: 35°36′41″N 139°49′38″E
- Carries: Road traffic (4 lanes), pedestrians
- Crosses: Tokyo Bay
- Locale: Kōtō City (Tokyo, Japan), between Chubo and Wakasu artificial islands)

Characteristics
- Design: cantilever bridge
- Total length: 2,618 m (8,589 ft) including approaches
- Width: 21 m (69 ft)
- Height: 87.8 m (288 ft)
- Longest span: 440 m (1,440 ft)
- No. of spans: 3
- Clearance below: 54.6 m (179 ft)

History
- Construction start: 2002
- Construction end: 2011
- Opened: 2012

Statistics
- Toll: None

Tokyo Gate Bridge (東京ゲートブリッジ, Tōkyō Gēto Burijji) is a truss cantilever bridge across Tokyo Bay in Kōtō, Tokyo, Japan. It opened on 12 February 2012 with an estimated total construction cost of 113 billion yen for the Stage II section of highway including the bridge.

== History ==
Part of a new four-lane highway ringing Tokyo, construction began in 2002 and was scheduled for completion in 2011, but the opening to traffic was delayed until 2012. With the provisional name of Tokyo Bay Waterfront Bridge (東京港臨海大橋, Tōkyōwan Rinkai Ōhashi) the public was asked for suggestions. From the 12,223 received, "Tokyo Gate Bridge" was chosen and officially announced on 15 November 2010.

== Design ==
The design fulfils the requirement to be high enough to allow large ships to pass underneath, but low enough not to interfere with air traffic to the nearby Haneda Airport. It is a double cantilever bridge, which means that the truss sections from either side can be completed in balance, and then joined by the addition of the relatively short central span. The resemblance of the bridge to two monsters facing off has given it the nickname of 'Dinosaur Bridge' (恐竜橋, Kyōryū-bashi)

== Gallery ==
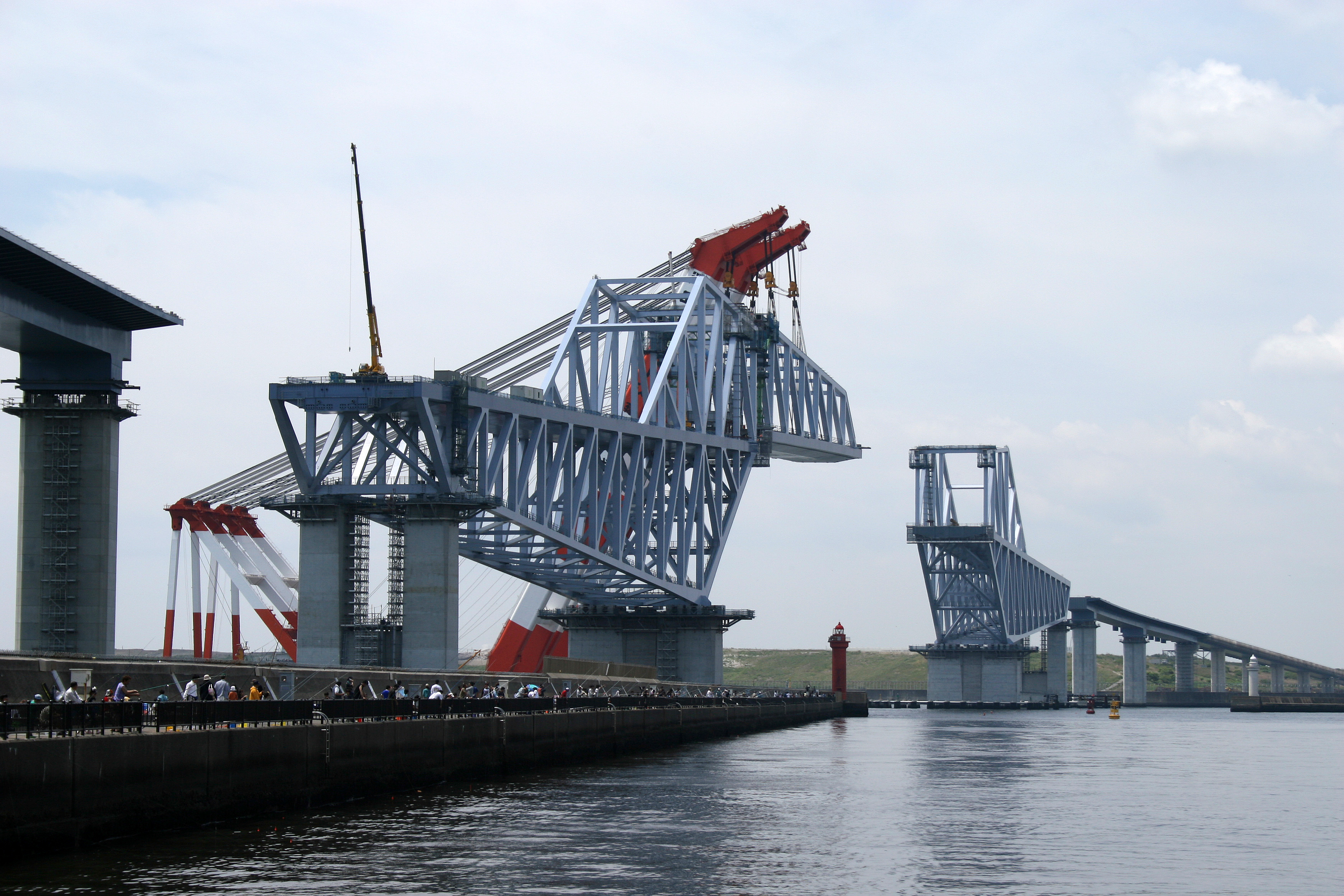
Tokyo Gate Bridge under construction (May 2010)

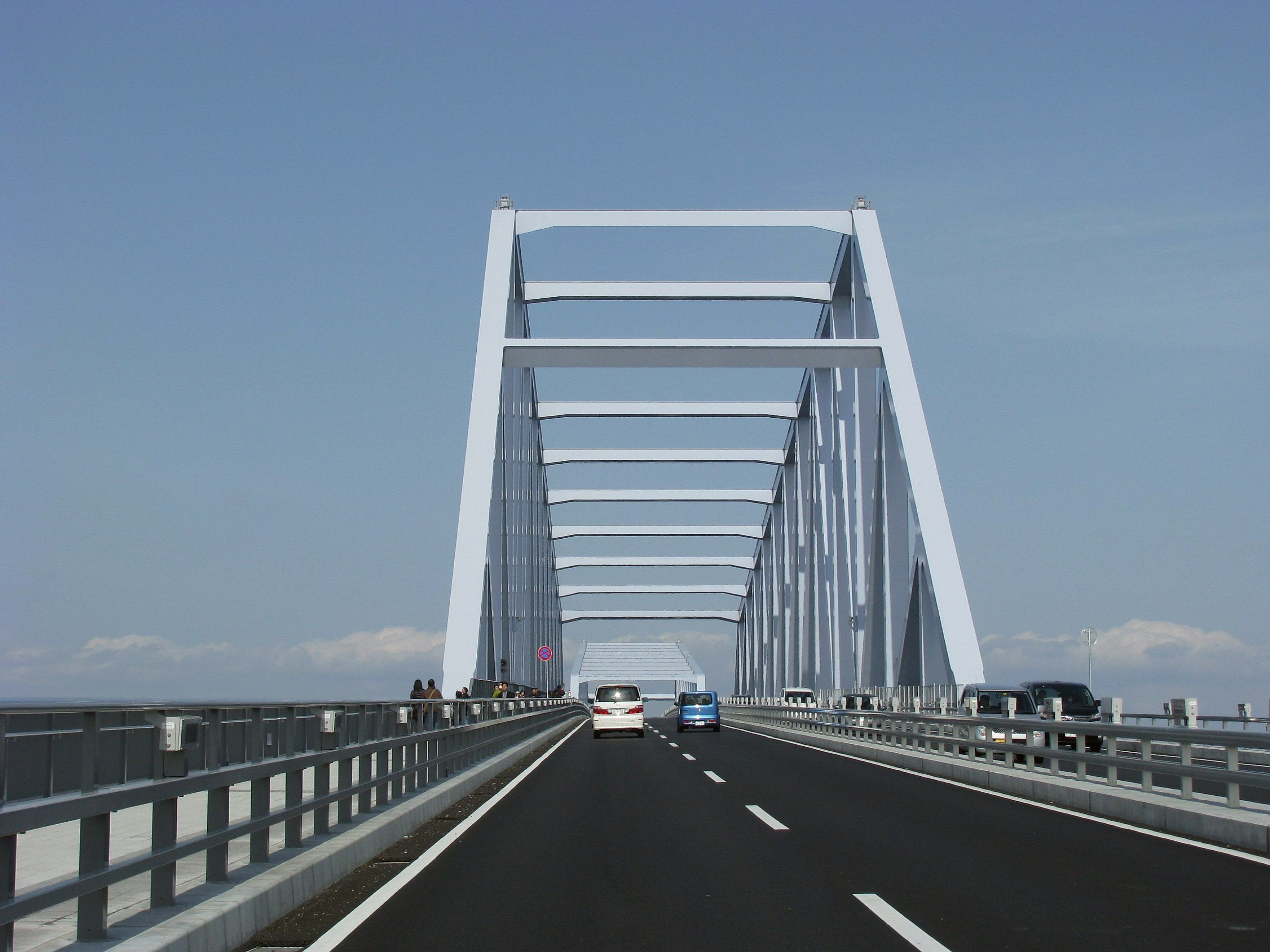
The bridge as seen from the roadway

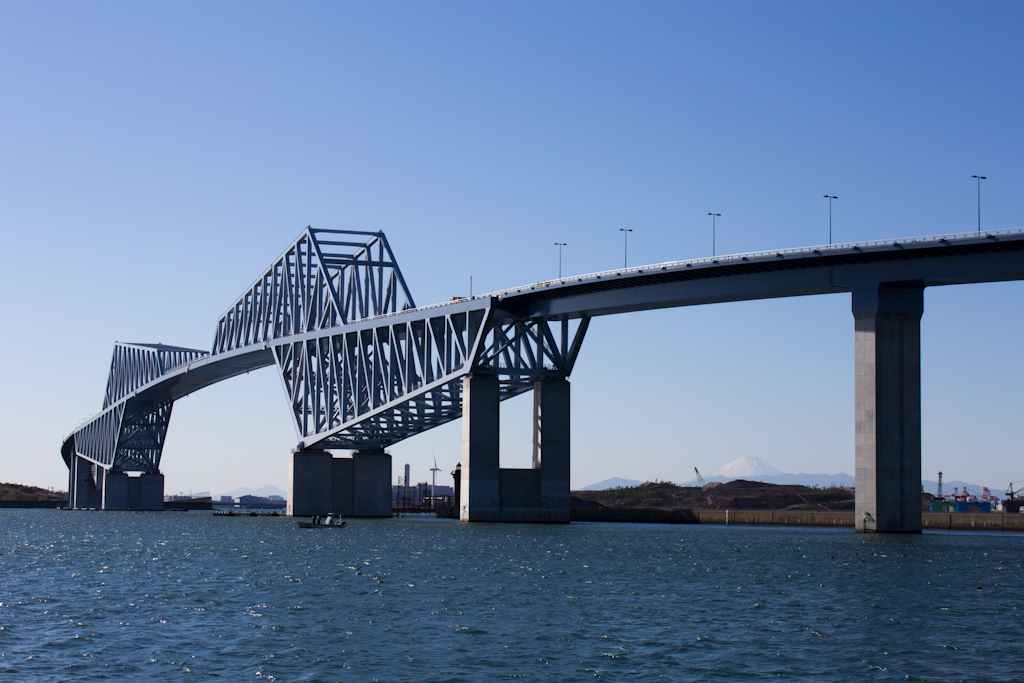
The main span of the bridge

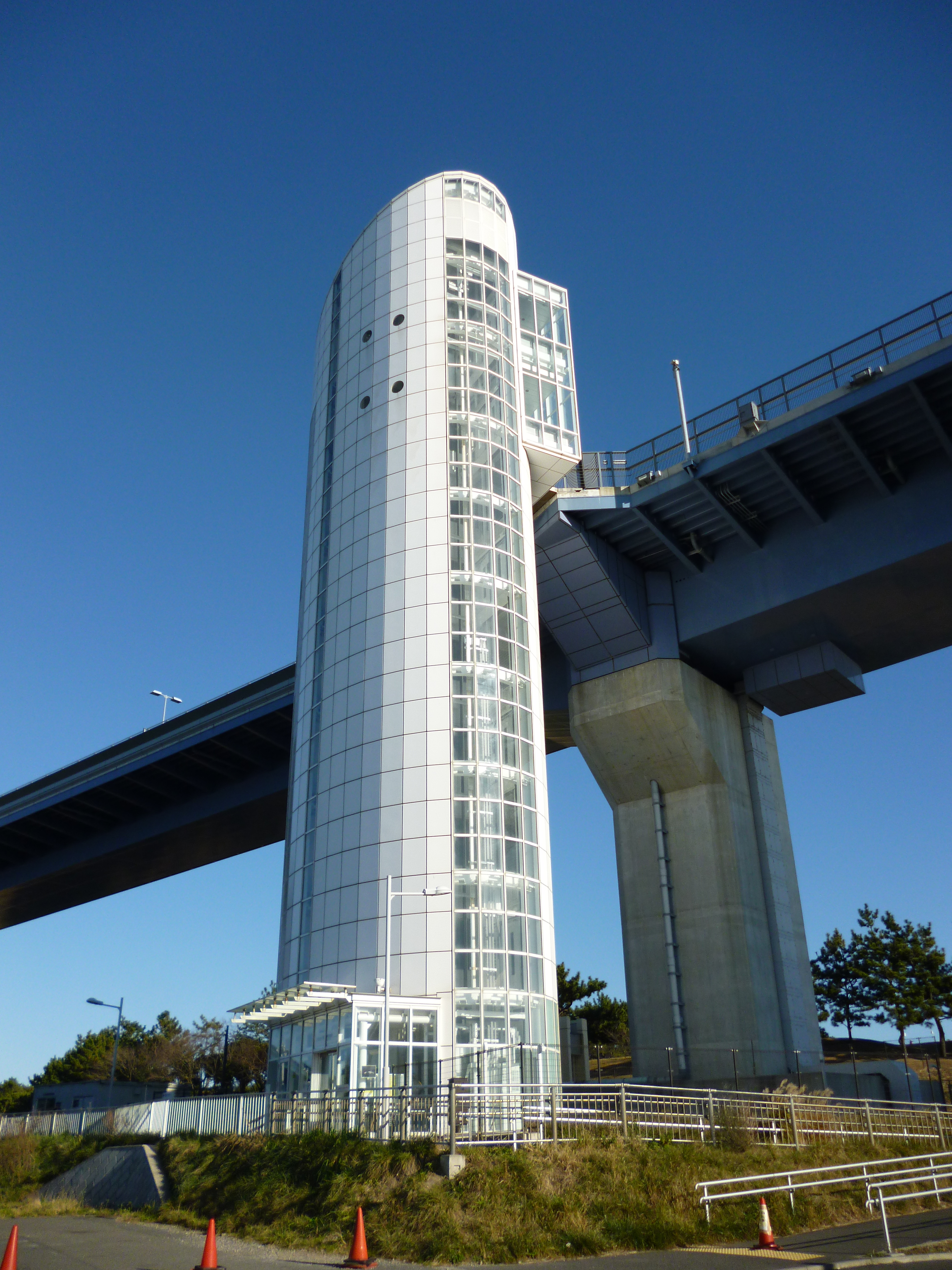
Elevator system for sightseeing

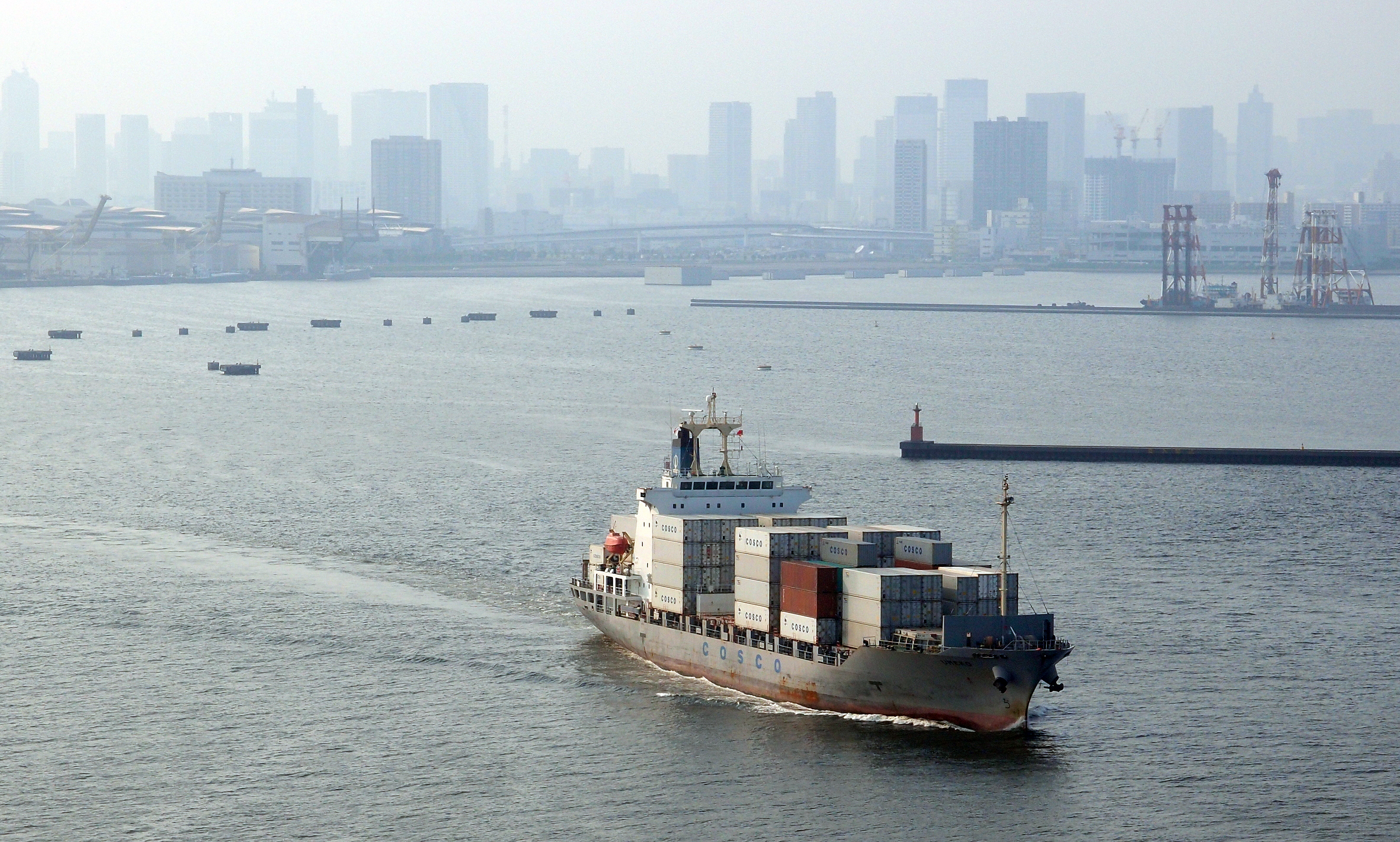
Tokyo port seen from the bridge

== Others ==
Visitors can take an elevator to the sidewalk on this bridge and walk on the sidewalk from Wakasu to Central Breakwater. But, you can only take an elevator to the sidewalk and the ground from Wakasu Gate, because Central Breakwater Gate is closed, so you cannot take an elevator to sidewalk and ground from Central Breakwater.

If you want to only see the bridge, you go to Wakasu Seaside Park and Central Breakwater.

== Access ==
The bridge can be accessed using the Wakasu Seaside Park Bus stop which 木31 - Shin-Kiba Station（Toei Bus passes through. The Central Breakwater Bus stop can also be used, which 波01 - Tokyo Teleport Station（Toei Bus）passes through. ※From Central Breakwater gate you cannot walk on the bridge.
