= Central Breakwater =

Artificial islands in Tokyo Bay, Japan

Coordinates: 35.5999121°N 139.8097697°E

Map

The Central Breakwater (中央防波堤, Chūō bōhatei) is a breakwater and artificial island located in Tokyo Bay, adjacent to the Tokyo Gate Bridge.

== History ==
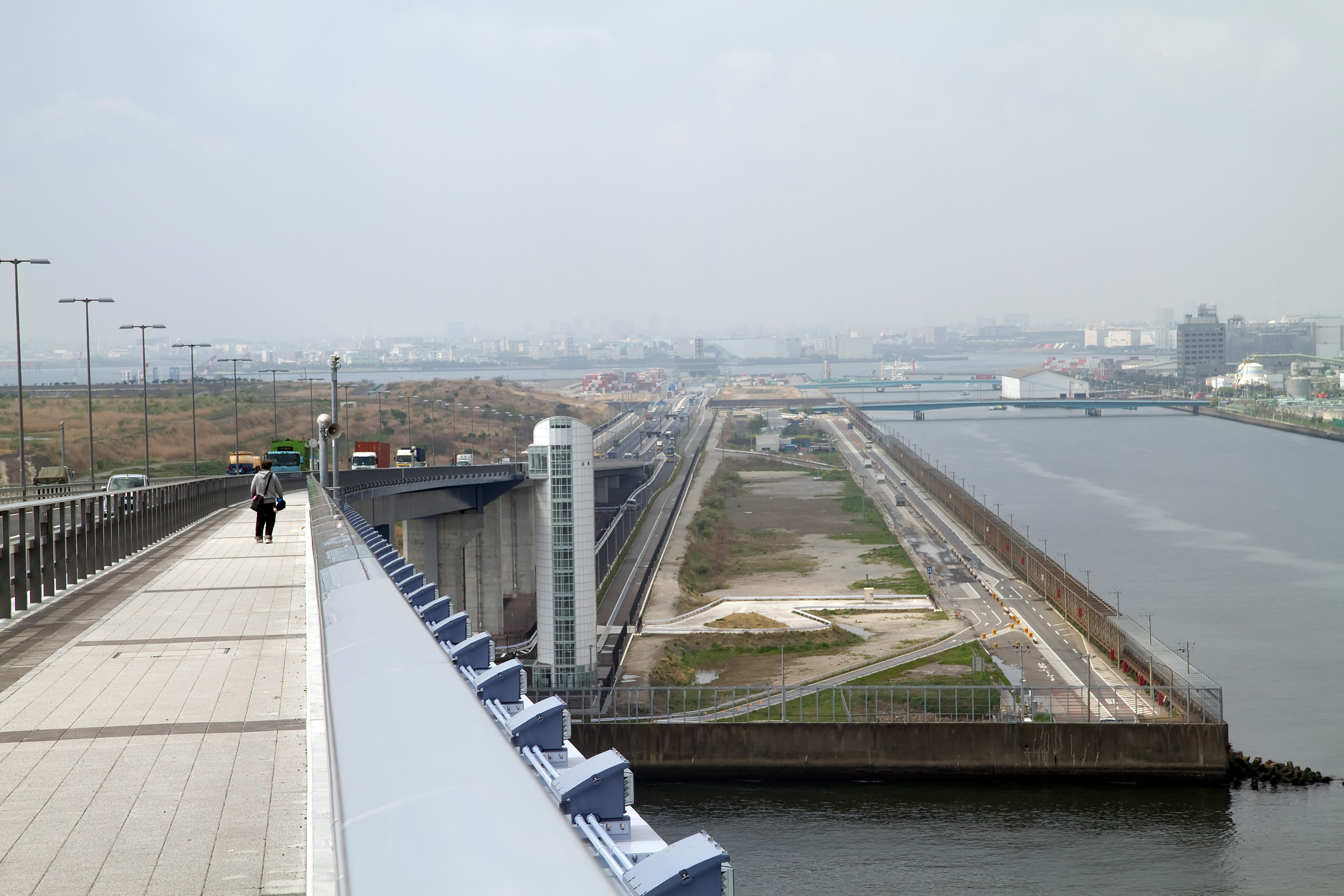
Central Breakwater seen from the Tokyo Gate Bridge

The Central Breakwater was first constructed in 1973 and has been used as a site for waste disposal from Tokyo since then, forming two artificial islands in Tokyo Bay known as the Inner Landfill (内側埋立地) and the Outer Landfill (外側埋立地). The islands had a combined area of 377 hectares in 2011 and are expected to ultimately reach an area of 989 hectares.

=== Jurisdiction dispute ===
Jurisdiction over the Central Breakwater islands was disputed between the special wards of Koto and Ota for 4 decades. Under Japanese law, any boundary dispute may be submitted to the prefectural government (in this case, the Tokyo metropolitan government) for resolution; a similar dispute with regard to the nearby Odaiba and Ariake area was resolved in 1982 by splitting the area between the three special wards that claimed it. Koto has argued that the garbage used to create the landfill was hauled through Koto and that making the island part of the special ward would repay residents for their trouble, while Ota has argued that the site of the breakwater was historically used by Ota-based nori cultivators, and that the island should be managed in coordination with nearby Haneda Airport (which is part of Ota). The dispute is mainly considered an issue of brand image; jurisdiction over the island offers little practical benefit to the special wards, as fixed asset taxes on real estate are collected by the metropolitan government.

On October 3, 2019 Tokyo District Court ruled 79.3% of the Central Breakwater landfills to Kōtō Ward and 20.7% to Ōta Ward for multiple decades. Ota Ward stated that it won't appeal the ruling. Thus the 40 year dispute was closed.

From December 17 to January 31, 2020 the public made 532 proposals for the town name of the west side to be incorporated in Ota Ward. On 1 June 2020, Reiwajima (令和島) became the official name. The east side of Koto Ward uses the name Sea Forest (海の森) which they were accustomed to.

=== 2020 Summer Olympics ===
The Central Breakwater was one of the planned venues for the 2020 Summer Olympics. The Inner Landfill would have hosted the Sea Forest Cross-Country Course for equestrian events, while the Outer Landfill would have hosted the Sea Forest Mountain Bike Course but was eventually moved to Izu, Shizuoka. The waterway between the two islands, named Sea Forest Waterway, was used for rowing and kayaking events. The venues were planned to be maintained as recreational areas after the Games.
