= Murder of Junko Furuta =

1989 murder of Japanese high school girl

Junko Furuta
- 古田 順子
- Furuta in 1988
- Born: 18 January 1971; Misato, Saitama, Japan
- Died: 4 January 1989 (aged 17); Adachi, Tokyo, Japan
- Cause of death: Murder (traumatic shock)
- Body discovered: 29 March 1989; Wakasu, Kōtō, Tokyo, Japan

Junko Furuta (Japanese: 古田 順子, Hepburn: Furuta Junko; 18 January 1971 – 4 January 1989) was a 17-year-old Japanese high school student who was abducted, raped, tortured, and murdered. Her abuse was mainly perpetrated by four male teenagers—Hiroshi Miyano (18), Jō Ogura (17), Shinji Minato (16), and Yasushi Watanabe (17)—and took place over a 40-day period starting on 25 November 1988.

In Japan, the case is known as the "concrete-encased high school girl murder case" (女子高生コンクリート詰め殺人事件, joshikōsei konkurīto-zume satsujin jiken), as her body was discovered inside of a concrete-filled drum. The prison sentences served by the perpetrators ranged from 7 to 20 years. The brutality of the case shocked Japan, and it is said to be the worst case of juvenile crime in the country's post-war history, and furthermore, it was the last heinous crime in Japan of the Shōwa era.

== Background ==
Furuta was born on 18 January 1971 and grew up in Misato, Saitama Prefecture, where she lived with her parents, older brother, and younger brother. At the time of her murder, she was a 17-year-old senior at Yashio-Minami High School. She worked a part-time job at a plastic molding factory from October 1988 to save up money for a planned graduation trip. Furuta accepted a job at an electronics retailer, where she planned on working after graduation. Furuta was well liked by her classmates and teachers, having high grades and infrequent absences. According to her friends, she dreamed of becoming an idol singer.

The perpetrators of the murder were four male teenagers: Hiroshi Miyano (宮野裕史, Miyano Hiroshi; 18 years old), Jō (Note: Some sources attest his first name as "Yuzuru", an alternate reading of the kanji 譲.) Ogura (小倉譲, Ogura Jō; 17), Shinji (Note: Some sources attest his first name as "Nobuharu", an alternate reading of the kanji 伸治.) Minato (湊伸治, Minato Shinji; 16), and Yasushi Watanabe (渡邊恭史, Watanabe Yasushi; 17), who in court documents were referred to as "A", "B", "C", and "D", respectively. Tetsuo Nakamura and Koichi Ihara, both 16, were referred to as "E" and "F". The four main perpetrators had each dropped out of high school in the summer of 1988 and became involved in organized crime as chinpira (low-ranking yakuza).

They began using Minato's family home in Adachi, Tokyo, as a hangout. Beginning in October, they engaged in crimes including theft (purse snatching and car theft), assault, and rape. On 8 November, the group abducted a 19-year-old woman in Adachi and gang raped her in a hotel there. On 27 December, during Furuta's captivity, the group abducted another 19-year-old woman in Adachi, and gang-raped her in a motel there.

== Kidnapping and abuse ==
Murder of Junko Furuta
- Native name: 女子高生コンクリート詰め殺人事件
- Location: Misato, Saitama, Japan (abduction); Adachi, Tokyo, Japan (confinement and murder)
- Date: 25 November 1988 – 4 January 1989
- Attack type: Abduction, rape, torture, murder
- Victim: Junko Furuta
- Perpetrators: Hiroshi Miyano (now Hiroshi Yokoyama); Jō Ogura (later Jō Kamisaku); Shinji Minato; Yasushi Watanabe
- Verdict: Guilty on all counts
- Convictions: Abduction for the purpose of sexual assault; Confinement; Rape; Assault; Murder; Abandonment of a corpse
- Sentence: Miyano: 20 years in prison (served 20); Ogura: 5–10 years in prison (served 10); Minato: 5–9 years in prison (served 9); Watanabe: 5–7 years in prison (served 7)

On the evening of 25 November 1988, Miyano and Minato rode around Misato on their motorcycles with the intention of robbing and raping local women, and spotted Furuta, who was on her way home from her part-time job. Acting on Miyano's orders, Minato kicked Furuta off her bicycle and fled the scene. Miyano, under the pretense of witnessing the attack by coincidence, approached Furuta and offered to walk her home. After further gaining her trust, Miyano walked Furuta to a nearby warehouse and threatened her, telling her that he was a yakuza member and that he would spare her only if she followed his orders.

That night, Miyano took Furuta by taxi to a hotel in Adachi, where he raped her. He later called Minato's house and bragged to Ogura about the rape, after which Ogura told him not to let Furuta leave. In the early morning hours of 26 November, Miyano took Furuta to a park near the hotel, where Ogura, Minato, and Watanabe were waiting. They told her they knew where she lived, and that the yakuza would kill her family if she attempted to escape. Minato agreed to allow Furuta to be confined in a room on the second floor of his house in Adachi for the purpose of gang raping her. Furuta was held captive for 40 days.

On 27 November, Furuta's parents filed a missing-person report with the police about her disappearance. During this period, on three separate occasions between late November and around December 16 of the same year, the kidnappers, including Miyano, had Furuta telephone her home and say things such as, "I ran away from home, so please do not file a missing-person report," and "Please withdraw the missing-person report," in an attempt to prevent authorities from searching for her whereabouts. When Minato's parents were present at the house where she was being confined, Furuta was forced to act as his girlfriend. Around the same time, Shinji Minato's mother happened to discover that Furuta was at her home and telephoned Furuta's family using a false name. Although Furuta's parents attempted to trace the identity behind the false name by making telephone calls to various places, their efforts proved fruitless. Eventually, they had no significant leads as to Furuta's whereabouts and continued to endure days. The group dropped this pretense when it became clear that Minato's parents would not report them to the police. The parents later claimed that they did not intervene because they were afraid of their son, who had been increasingly violent toward them.

On the night of 28 November, Miyano and the others, along with Nakamura and Ihara, gang raped Furuta, after which Miyano shaved her pubic hair with a razor and used a match to burn her genital area. In early December, as punishment for an escape attempt, the group repeatedly punched Furuta in the face, and Miyano burned her ankles with a lighter. They forced Furuta to dance to music while naked, masturbate in front of them, and stand on the balcony in the middle of the night with little clothing, and inserted objects into her vagina and anus, including a metal rod and a bottle.

They forced her to drink large amounts of alcohol, milk, and water, smoke two cigarettes at once, and inhale paint thinner fumes. In one attack in the middle of December, Furuta was beaten by the group, on the pretext that Miyano had stepped on a puddle of her urine, after which he burned her thighs and hands several times with lighter fluid. From around this time, Furuta, unable to bear the repeated assaults, would sometimes plead to be killed by her captors.

Throughout the rest of December, the severity of Furuta's abuse continued to escalate. By the end of the month she was severely malnourished after being fed only small amounts of food, and eventually only milk. Due to her injuries, she became unable to walk to the downstairs toilet, and was confined to the room's floor in a state of extreme weakness. Her appearance was disfigured by the beatings, with her face swollen to the point of unrecognizability, and her wounds had started to emit a foul odor.

== Murder and investigation ==
On 4 January 1989, after losing money in a game of mahjong the night before, Miyano decided to take his anger out on Furuta. He ignited a candle and dripped hot wax on her face, placed two shortened candles on her eyelids, and forced her to drink her own urine. Furuta was lifted and kicked, fell onto a stereo unit, and began a fit of convulsions.

To prevent them from being stained with blood, the group covered their hands in plastic bags before beating her with their fists and an iron exercise ball, and dropped the ball on her abdomen several times. Miyano poured lighter fluid on Furuta and set her on fire; she made weak attempts to put herself out, but soon stopped moving. The assault lasted for about two hours, after which Furuta died at 10 a.m.

Less than 24 hours after her death, Minato's brother called to tell him that Furuta appeared to be dead. Afraid that their crime would be discovered, the group wrapped Furuta's body in a blanket and placed it in a large travel bag, then put the bag in a metal drum and filled it with wet concrete. At around 8:00 p.m. on 5 January, the group drove to a vacant lot near a construction site on the island of Wakasu in Kōtō, Tokyo, and dumped the drum there.

In early 1989, Miyano and Ogura were arrested for kidnapping and gang raping a 19-year-old woman in December 1988. When police interrogated Miyano, he wrongly believed that Ogura had already confessed to Furuta's murder and that the police were aware of this, so he told them where to find her body. The police were initially puzzled by his confession, as they were questioning him about a different gang-rape. The drum containing Furuta's body was recovered on 29 March, and she was identified via fingerprints. Minato, Watanabe, Minato's brother, Nakamura, and Ihara were also arrested.

== Trial and reaction ==
In July 1990, all were found guilty and sentenced by the Tokyo District Court for abduction for the purpose of sexual assault, confinement, rape, assault, murder, and abandonment of a corpse. All four appealed. In July 1991, three were re-sentenced to longer terms by the Tokyo High Court.

- Hiroshi Miyano was originally sentenced to 17 years in prison, and re-sentenced to 20 years, the longest sentence typically given in Japan short of life imprisonment, which had been sought by the prosecution. Miyano's parents sold their family home and paid Furuta's parents ¥50 million (about US$350,000; $850,000 today) in compensation, which their son's defense presented as a mitigating circumstance. A court-ordered psychological evaluation at the trial established that Miyano had a learning disability that "did not impair his brain function, but delayed his emotional development". After his release in 2009, he changed his last name to "Yokoyama". He reportedly boasted about his yakuza connections and involvement in pyramid schemes. In 2013, Yokoyama was arrested on suspicion of bank fraud and placing scam phone calls, but remained silent and was not charged.
- Jō Ogura was sentenced to five to ten years in prison. He was released in 1999, changed his last name to "Kamisaku", and began working in an IT position. In 2000, Kamisaku married a Chinese woman and moved to Chiba Prefecture, but divorced after a few years and returned to his mother's home in Saitama. He lost his job after his past became known to his colleagues, and again became involved in the yakuza. In 2004, Kamisaku was arrested for assaulting Takatoshi Isono, a 27-year-old acquaintance whom he thought was involved with a girlfriend. He shoved Isono into the trunk of a car and drove him to his mother's bar in Misato, where he assaulted him for four hours. Kamisaku was sentenced to four years in prison for the crime. After his release in 2009, he relied on welfare and lived alone in an apartment in Saitama, where he died in an accident on 16 July 2022, at age 51 —‌while on psychiatric medication, Kamisaku collapsed, got his head stuck between the toilet bowl and tank, and choked on his vomit.
- Shinji Minato was originally sentenced to five to six years in prison, and re-sentenced to five to nine years. His parents and brother were not charged. After his release in 1998, Minato moved in with his mother. In 2018, Minato, then unemployed, was arrested on suspicion of attempted murder, after striking a 32-year-old man in the shoulder with a metal baton and slashing his neck with a knife on a street in Kawaguchi, Saitama, during a dispute over a vehicle parking spot. In 2019, Minato was sentenced to one year and six months in prison, suspended with probation for three years.
- Yasushi Watanabe was originally sentenced to three to four years in prison, and re-sentenced to five to seven years. He appealed the verdict to the Supreme Court of Japan. His appeal was denied in July 1992. He was released in 1996, and lived in an apartment with his mother in Tokyo. By 2005, Watanabe had developed a neurodegenerative disease, but did not have money to treat it. He died in May 2021, at age 49.
- Tetsuo Nakamura and Koichi Ihara, who also raped Furuta but did not participate in her murder, were released from juvenile detention by 2000.

=== Reactions ===
From the time the case was first reported in the media, the Tokyo Metropolitan Police Department (the investigating body) received many calls and letters from the general public demanding that the perpetrators be severely punished, including by life imprisonment or with the death penalty. The Tokyo Public Prosecutors Office, which had sought life imprisonment for Miyano during the trial, was criticized for not seeking life sentences for the other perpetrators, nor seeking the death penalty. The Tokyo District Court also received numerous calls and letters which criticized the perceived lightness of its sentencing.

A majority of legal professionals surveyed by the Asahi Shimbun newspaper said that the sentences were appropriate based on precedent. In the Nagoya couple murder case of 1988, for example—‌a case which drew comparisons to the Furuta case—‌the Nagoya District Court had sentenced the main defendant, a 19-year-old male, to death, and a second defendant, a 17-year-old male, to life imprisonment in June 1989, despite the death sentence being commuted to life imprisonment in 1996.

Hiroshi Itakura, a professor of law at Nihon University, commented that the difference in sentencing was explained by the difference in the number of victims (two in the Nagoya case, versus one in the Furuta case). Under the "Nagayama standard", the death penalty in Japan is rarely applied in cases with one victim. Itakura also stated that the prosecution in the Nagoya murder case had demonstrated clear premeditation, while in the Furuta case the intent to murder was more uncertain.

==== Reaction from the victim's family ====
According to the Tokyo High Court, the victim's parents and other bereaved family members expressed profound anger and grief over the crime and strongly demanded severe punishment for the defendants. In his testimony before the court, Furuta's father also expressed his profound distrust and dissatisfaction, stating emotionally that the sentences imposed on the defendants by the original judgment were far too lenient.

On March 29, 1989, the drum can containing Furuta's body was finally discovered. When her father viewed the body the following day, it had decomposed to such an extent that even her own parents could scarcely recognize her immediately. Overwhelmed by grief, Furuta's mother fell ill and, as of the time of the proceedings, continued to receive outpatient treatment in a psychiatric department.

=== Real-name disclosure of the offenders ===
Under the Juvenile Act, Article 61 prohibits the publication of any information that could identify a juvenile who has been referred to family court proceedings or a person prosecuted for a crime committed while they were a juvenile, including the names of individuals involved, school names, and place names. However, Shukan Bunshun, published by Bungeishunju shortly after the incident, identified the juvenile perpetrators involved in the case by their real names. The report was handled by journalist Masahiko Katsuya and edited by editor-in-chief Toshinori Hanada.

In an interview published in the April 30, 1989 morning edition of The Asahi Shimbun, Shukan Bunshun editor-in-chief Toshinori Hanada explained that the magazine had initially referred to the perpetrators anonymously in its first article. However, as the editorial team conducted further reporting for the second article and learned more about the brutality of the crime, some members began arguing that the perpetrators' real names should be published. Hanada stated, "Beasts have no human rights." Regarding the readers' reactions, Hanada said that he had honestly expected stronger opposition, but was surprised that the magazine received only about two complaints. In contrast, it received dozens of letters praising the decision, with readers expressing sentiments such as, "Thank you for doing this." He added that he wanted to ask those who raised human rights concerns, "Could you say the same thing in front of the victim's parents?"

Shūkan Shinchō refrained from publishing the real names of the boys at the time of the incident, stating that "there were unclear aspects regarding which members of the perpetrator group had carried out which acts." However, Shūkan Shinchō also published a feature article in its April 13, 1989 issue, reporting that "there are claims that the parents of C, who provided the location where the victim was confined, were members of the Japanese Communist Party." In response, the Japanese Communist Party acknowledged in its official newspaper, Shimbun Akahata, that the parents in question were party members. A series of feature articles examining the parents' handling of the matter was subsequently published in Shimbun Akahata.

== Aftermath ==
Furuta's funeral was held on 2 April 1989. During the ceremony, one of her friends named Kana Miyashita delivered a eulogy written by her classmates, which stated:

Jun-chan, welcome home. I never dreamed we would meet again like this. You were in so much pain, weren’t you? You suffered so much, didn't you? I'm upset with myself that I went on living, unaware of what was happening. You were always so gentle and cheerful, Jun-chan. The matching red happi we made for the cultural festival looked wonderful on you. I'll never forget that. We will absolutely not let Jun-chan's death be in vain. We, too, as first-year working adults, will do our best to help create a peaceful society where such horrifying crimes no longer happen, and where everyone can live their days in peace. And whenever we face hardships of our own, we will remember you, Jun-chan, and how you tried with all your strength to keep living without giving up. The principal even brought your diploma. Thanks to this, all 47 of us in Class 3-8 were able to graduate. Jun-chan... there's no more pain or suffering now. Rest peacefully. Farewell, Jun-chan.

== See also ==
- 1995 Okinawa rape incident – Rape of a Japanese girl by US servicemen
- Concrete – 2004 Japanese film based on the case
- Hello Kitty murder case – 1999 murder in Hong Kong
- List of kidnappings
- List of solved missing person cases: 1950–1999
