= 37th Japan Academy Film Prize =

Japanese film awards in 2014

- Date: March 7, 2014
- Site: Grand Prince Hotel New Takanawa, Tokyo, Japan
- Hosted by: Toshiyuki Nishida; Kirin Kiki

Highlights
- Most nominations: The Great Passage; Like Father, Like Son; Tokyo Family (12)

The 37th Japan Academy Film Prize (第37回日本アカデミー賞) is the 37th edition of the Japan Academy Film Prize, an award presented by the Nippon Academy-Sho Association to award excellence in filmmaking. It awarded the best films of 2013 and it took place on March 7, 2014 at the Grand Prince Hotel New Takanawa in Tokyo, Japan.

== Nominees ==
=== Awards ===
Picture of the Year	Animation of the Year
The Great Passage; The Devil's Path; A Boy Called H; Like Father, Like Son; Tokyo Family; Ask This of Rikyu	The Wind Rises; The Tale of Princess Kaguya; Space Pirate Captain Harlock; Puella Magi Madoka Magica the Movie: Rebellion; Lupin the 3rd vs. Detective Conan: The Movie
Director of the Year	Screenplay of the Year
Yuya Ishii – The Great Passage; Hirokazu Koreeda – Like Father, Like Son; Kazuya Shiraishi – The Devil's Path; Kōki Mitani – The Kiyosu Conference; Yoji Yamada – Tokyo Family	Kensaku Watanabe – The Great Passage; Hirokazu Koreeda – Like Father, Like Son; Izumi Takahashi and Kazuya Shiraishi – The Devil's Path; Kōki Mitani – The Kiyosu Conference; Yoji Yamada and Emiko Hiramatsu – Tokyo Family
Outstanding Performance by an Actor in a Leading Role	Outstanding Performance by an Actress in a Leading Role
Ryuhei Matsuda – The Great Passage; Ichikawa Ebizō XI – Ask This of Rikyu; Isao Hashizume – Tokyo Family; Masaharu Fukuyama – Like Father, Like Son; Ken Watanabe – Unforgiven	Yōko Maki – The Ravine of Goodbye; Aya Ueto – A Tale of Samurai Cooking; Machiko Ono – Like Father, Like Son; Aoi Miyazaki – The Great Passage; Kazuko Yoshiyuki – Tokyo Family
Outstanding Performance by an Actor in a Supporting Role	Outstanding Performance by an Actress in a Supporting Role
Lily Franky – Like Father, Like Son; Joe Odagiri – The Great Passage; Satoshi Tsumabuki – Tokyo Family; Pierre Taki – The Devil's Path; Ryuhei Matsuda – The Detective Is in the Bar; Lily Franky – The Devil's Path	Yōko Maki – Like Father, Like Son; Yū Aoi – Tokyo Family; Machiko Ono – The Detective Is in the Bar; Miki Nakatani – Ask This of Rikyu; Kimiko Yo – A Tale of Samurai Cooking
Popularity Award	Newcomer of the Year
Masayasu Wakabayashi – Seven Days of Himawari and Her Puppies (Actor Category); Midsummer's Equation (Production Category)	Shioli Kutsuna – Unforgiven and Before the Vigil; Haru Kuroki – The Great Passage and Sougen no Isu; Dan Mitsu – Amai Muchi; Kokone Hamada – Oshin; Gō Ayano – The Story of Yonosuke and Natsu no Owari; Masaki Suda – The Backwater; Gen Hoshino – Blindly in Love and Why Don't You Play in Hell?; Tatsuki Yoshioka – A Boy Called H
Outstanding Achievement in Music	Outstanding Achievement in Cinematography
Joe Hisaishi – The Wind Rises; Taro Iwashiro – Ask This of Rikyu; Kiyoko Ogino – The Kiyosu Conference; Junichi Matsumoto, Takashi Mori and Takeshi Matsubara – Like Father, Like Son; Takashi Watanabe – The Great Passage; Joe Hisaishi – The Tale of Princess Kaguya and Tokyo Family	Norimichi Kasamatsu – Unforgiven; Mikiya Takimoto – Like Father, Like Son; Masashi Chikamori – Tokyo Family; Takeshi Hamada – Ask This of Rikyu; Junichi Fujisawa – The Great Passage
Outstanding Achievement in Lighting Direction	Outstanding Achievement in Art Direction
Kōichi Watanabe – Unforgiven; Norikiyo Fujii – Like Father, Like Son; Kiyoto Andō – Ask This of Rikyu; Tatsuya Osada – The Great Passage; Kōichi Watanabe – Tokyo Family	Takashi Yoshida – Ask This of Rikyu; Yōhei Taneda and Kimie Kurotaki – The Kiyosu Conference; Katsumi Nakazawa – A Boy Called H; Mitsuo Harada – The Great Passage; Mitsuo Harada and Ryo Sugimoto – Unforgiven
Outstanding Achievement in Sound Recording	Outstanding Achievement in Film Editing
Hirokazu Katō – The Great Passage; Kazumi Kishida – Tokyo Family; Tetsuo Segawa – The Kiyosu Conference; Yutaka Tsurumaki – Like Father, Like Son; Nobuhiko Matsukage – Ask This of Rikyu	Shinichi Fushima – The Great Passage; Iwao Ishii – Tokyo Family; Sōichi Ueno – The Kiyosu Conference; Hirokazu Koreeda – Like Father, Like Son; Kazunobu Fujita – Ask This of Rikyu
Outstanding Foreign Language Film	Special Award from the Chairman
Les Misérables; 3 Idiots; Captain Phillips; Django Unchained; Gravity	Nagisa Oshima (Director); Etsuko Takano (Iwanami Hall Manager, President of Equipe de Cinema); Kumagai Hideo (Lighting Technician); Rentarō Mikuni (Actor); Isao Natsuyagi (Actor)
Special Award from the Association	Special Award of Honour from the Association
Akane Shiratori (Scriptwriter); Akira Fukuda (Costume Designer); Harumi Yoshida (Sceneshifter)	Ken Takakura (Actor)

== Films with multiple nominations ==
The following films received multiple nominations:
Note: Incomplete.

Nominations	Film
12	The Great Passage
12	Like Father, Like Son
12	Tokyo Family
9	Ask This of Rikyu
