= 35th Yokohama Film Festival =

2014 film festival in Yokohama, Japan

- Location: Yokohama, Kanagawa, Japan
- Founded: 1980
- Festival date: 2014

The 35th Yokohama Film Festival (第35回ヨコハマ映画祭) was held in 2014 in Yokohama, Kanagawa, Japan.

== Awards ==
- Best Film: - The Devil's Path
- Best Director: Azuma Morisaki - Pecoross' Mother and Her Days
- Yoshimitsu Morita Memorial Best New Director:
  - Kazuya Shiraishi - The Devil's Path
  - Ryōta Nakano - Capturing Dad
- Best Screenplay: Hirokazu Koreeda - Like Father, Like Son
- Best Cinematographer: Takeshi Hamada - Pecoross' Mother and Her Days
- Best Music: Gorō Yasukawa - The Devil's Path, Hello, My Dolly Girlfriend, Amai Muchi, Human Trust, etc...
- Best Actor: Masaharu Fukuyama - Like Father, Like Son, Midsummer's Equation
- Best Actress: Yōko Maki - The Ravine of Goodbye
- Best Supporting Actor: Lily Franky - The Devil's Path, Like Father, Like Son
- Best Supporting Actress:
  - Fumi Nikaidō - Why Don't You Play in Hell?, Mourning Recipe, The Brain Man
  - Makiko Watanabe - Capturing Dad and Nobody's Perfect, etc...
- Best Newcomer:
  - Ayaka Miyoshi - Leaving on the 15th Spring, Good Morning Everyone!
  - Gen Hoshino - Why Don't You Play in Hell?, Blindly in Love
  - Haru Kuroki - The Great Passage, A Chair on the Plains, Flower of Shanidar, etc...

== Best 10 ==
1. The Devil's Path
2. The Great Passage
3. Pecoross' Mother and Her Days
4. Like Father, Like Son
5. The Story of Yonosuke
6. The Ravine of Goodbye
7. Why Don't You Play in Hell?
8. Unforgiven
9. The Backwater
10. Capturing Dad

runner-up: The Vortex of Love
