= 8th Asian Film Awards =

2014 edition of award ceremony

- Date: 27 March 2014
- Site: Macau

Highlights
- Best Film: The Grandmaster
- Most awards: The Grandmaster (7)
- Most nominations: The Grandmaster (11)

The 8th Asian Film Awards are the 2014 edition of the Asian Film Awards. The ceremony was held in Macau.

== Winners and nominees ==
Winners are listed first and highlighted in bold.

Best Film	Best Director
**The Grandmaster** (Hong Kong) / (China); No Man's Land (China); The Great Passage (Japan); The Lunchbox (India); Snowpiercer (South Korea) / (United States) / (France); Stray Dogs (France) / (Taiwan)	**Wong Kar-wai – The Grandmaster** (Hong Kong) / (China); Joon-ho Bong – Snowpiercer (South Korea) / (United States) / (France); Anthony Chen – Ilo Ilo (Singapore); Hirokazu Koreeda – Like Father Like Son (Japan); Tsai Ming-liang – Stray Dogs (France) / (Taiwan)
Best Actor	Best Actress
**Irrfan Khan – The Lunchbox** (India); Masaharu Fukuyama – Like Father Like Son (Japan); Lee Kang-sheng – Stray Dogs (France) / (Taiwan); Tony Leung Chiu-Wai – The Grandmaster (Hong Kong) / (China); Song Kang-ho – The Attorney (South Korea)	**Zhang Ziyi – The Grandmaster** (Hong Kong) / (China); Eugene Domingo – Barber's Tales (Philippines); Han Hyo-joo – Cold Eyes (South Korea); Paw Hee-ching – Rigor Mortis (Hong Kong); Yōko Maki – The Ravine of Goodbye (Japan)
Best Newcomer	Best Supporting Actor
**Jiang Shuying – So Young** (China); Babyjohn Choi – The Way we Dance (Hong Kong); Yim Si-wan – The Attorney (South Korea); Misaki Kinoshita – The Backwater (Japan); Keita Ninomiya – Like Father Like Son (Japan)	**Huang Bo – No Man's Land** (China); Mark Chao – So Young (China); Jung Woo-sung – Cold Eyes (South Korea); Joe Odagiri – The Great Passage (Japan); Satoshi Tsumabuki – Tokyo Family (Japan)
Best Supporting Actress	Best Screenwriter
**Yeo Yann Yann – Ilo Ilo** (Singapore); Yū Aoi – Tokyo Family (Japan); Mavis Fan – Will You Still Love Me Tomorrow? (Taiwan); Kim Young-ae – The Attorney (South Korea); Fumi Nikaidō – Why Don't You Play in Hell? (Japan)	**Ritesh Batra – The Lunchbox** (India); Bong Joon-ho and Kelly Masterson – Snowpiercer (South Korea) / (United States) / (France); Li Qiang – So Young (China); Kensaku Watanabe – The Great Passage (Japan); Wong Kar-wai, Zou Jingzhi and Xu Haofeng – The Grandmaster (Hong Kong) / (China)
Best Cinematographer	Best Production Designer
**Philippe Le Sourd – The Grandmaster** (Hong Kong) / (China); Kim Byeong-seo and Yeo Kyung-bo – Cold Eyes (South Korea); Liao Pen Jung, Shong Woon Chong and Lu Qing Xin – Stray Dogs (France) / (Taiwan); Man-Ching Ng – Rigor Mortis (Hong Kong); Aziz Zhambakiyev – Harmony Lessons (Kazakhstan) / (Germany) / (France)	**William Chang and Alfred Yau Wai Ming – The Grandmaster** (Hong Kong) / (China); Hao Yi – No Man's Land (China); Hisao Inagaki – Why Don't You Play in Hell? (Japan); Ken Mak – Young Detective Dee: Rise of the Sea Dragon – (Hong Kong) / (China); Ondřej Nekvasil – Snowpiercer (South Korea) / (United States) / (France)
Best Composer	Best Editor
**Shigeru Umebayashi and Nathaniel Mechaly – The Grandmaster** (Hong Kong) / (China); Zeke Khaseli and Yudhi Arfan – What They Don't Talk About When They Talk About Love (Indonesia); Ehsaan Noorani, Shankar Mahadevan and Loy Mendonsa – Run Milkha Run (India)	**Shin Min-kyung – Cold Eyes** (South Korea); William Chang, Benjamin Courtines and Poon Hung Yiu – The Grandmaster (Hong Kong) / (China); Du Yuan – No Man's Land (China); Junichi Ito – Why Don't You Play in Hell? (Japan); David Richardson – Rigor Mortis (Hong Kong)
Best Visual Effects	Best Costume Designer
**Jeong Seong-jin – Mr. Go** (South Korea) / (China); Shuji Asano – Real (Japan); Pierre Buffin – The Grandmaster (Hong Kong) / (China); Enoch Chan – Rigor Mortis (Hong Kong); Kim Wook and Park Soo Young – Young Detective Dee: Rise of the Sea Dragon – (Hong Kong) / (China)	**William Chang – The Grandmaster** (Hong Kong) / (China); Catherine George – Snowpiercer (South Korea) / (United States) / (France); Pik Kwan Lee and Bruce Yu – Young Detective Dee: Rise of the Sea Dragon – (Hong Kong) / (China); Shim Hyun-sub – The Face Reader (South Korea)
