= Mitsutoshi Tanaka =

Japanese film director, commercial director

- 田中光敏
- Born: 24 September 1958 (age 68); Urakawa, Hokkaido, Japan
- Education: Osaka University of Arts
- Occupations: Film director, commercial director
- Years active: 1981–present
- Organization: Creators' Union
- Works: Godai - The Wunderkind; 125 Years Memory; Blossoms Bloom; Ask This of Rikyu; Castle under Fiery Skies; The Boat to Heaven; Kewaishi
- Awards: Kinema Junpo Best Ten; Japan Academy Film Prize
- Website: www.c-union.co.jp/m-tanaka

Mitsutoshi Tanaka (田中光敏; born 24 September 1958 in Urakawa, Hokkaido) is a Japanese film and commercial director. He is president and CEO of Osaka-based film production firm Creators' Union and widely known for award-winning feature films such as Godai - The Wunderkind (2020), 125 Years Memory (2015), Blossoms Bloom (2014) and Ask This of Rikyu (2013). He has received numerous awards, including the Kinema Junpo Best Ten Readers' Choice Award for Best Japanese Director for his period drama Godai - The Wunderkind and the Japan Academy Film Prize as Excellent Director for the Japanese-Turkish co-production 125 Years Memory.

== Career ==
After graduating from the Osaka University of Arts Department of Visual Concept Planning in 1981, Tanaka worked with Dentsu Eigasha (now Dentsu Tec) and TV Man Union. He established Osaka-based film production firm Creators' Union in 1984 and has served as the company's president and CEO since that time. He was appointed Dean of the Osaka University of Arts Department of Visual Concept Planning in 2022 where he has been teaching as a professor since 2014. He has been a visiting fellow with the Wakayama University Center for Tourism Research since 2017.

As a commercial director he has been working in various areas such as promotional videos, TV commercials and music videos and has received many awards, including the All Japan Radio & Television Commercial Confederation Award, the Japan Commercial Broadcasters Association Award and the Japan Industrial Film Competition Prize. His works include tourism promotion videos for Awara and Mihama municipalities, TV commercials for Honda Motor and Panasonic and music videos for Yi-Fang Wu and The Pipettes. He has directed several TV dramas, most notably the 1993 Japanese-Chinese co-production The Land of the Three Kingdoms for TV Osaka.

His first theatrical feature Kewaishi was released in 2001. The period drama was an official selection at the Shanghai International Film Festival and won the Award for Best Screenplay at the Tokyo International Film Festival. He became widely known for award-winning works such as Godai - The Wunderkind (2020), 125 Years Memory (2015), Blossoms Bloom (2014), Ask This of Rikyu (2013) and Castle under Fiery Skies (2009). He has received numerous awards, including the 94th Kinema Junpo Best Ten Readers' Choice Award for Best Japanese Director for his film Godai - The Wunderkind, the 39th Japan Academy Film Prize as Excellent Director for 125 Years Memory, the Best Director Award at the 1st Asia International Film Festival in Taipei for Blossoms Bloom and the Best Director Award at the 2014 Osaka Cinema Festival for Ask This of Rikyu.

Tanaka was appointed as Tourism Ambassador of his hometown Urakawa, Hokkaido in 2010, Honorary Director of the Kushimoto Turkish Museum in 2016 and Tourism Ambassador of Awara, Fukui in 2017. In 2016 he received the Governor's Award of Wakayama Prefecture and the Mayor's Award of Kushimoto Municipality.

== Feature films and film awards ==
2001: Kewaishi (化粧師)

Period drama based on a manga by Shotaro Ishinomori

- Official selection at the 5th Shanghai International Film Festival
- Best Screenplay Award at the 14th Tokyo International Film Festival

2003: The Boat to Heaven (精霊流し, Shoro Nagashi)

Adaptation of Masashi Sada's autobiographical novel of the same name

- 21st Japanese Cinema Reconstruction and Promotion Award
- 46th Blue Ribbon Award for Best Supporting Actor

2009: Castle Under Fiery Skies (火天の城, Katen no Shiro)

Period drama based on Kenichi Yamamoto's novel of the same name about Azuchi Castle

- 33rd Japan Academy Film Prize for Excellent Art Direction

2013: Ask This of Rikyu (利休にたずねよ, Rikyu ni Tazuneyo)

Period drama based on Kenichi Yamamoto's award-winning novel of the same name

- Best Director Award at the 2014 Osaka Cinema Festival
- Best Artistic Contribution Award at the 37th Montréal World Film Festival
- 37th Japan Academy Film Prize for Best Art Direction, Excellent Film, Excellent Leading Actor, Excellent Supporting Actress, Excellent Music, Excellent Cinematography, Excellent Editing, Excellent Sound Recording, Excellent Lighting
- 30th Fumiko Yamaji Cultural Award

2014: Blossoms Bloom (サクラサク, Sakura Saku)

Family drama based on Masashi Sada's short story of the same name

- Official selection at the 38th Montréal World Film Festival
- Awards for Best Director, Best Actress, Best Music at the 1st Asia International Film Festival in Taipei

2015: 125 Years Memory (海難1890, Kainan 1890)

A call for world peace based on two historical events

- Canadian premiere screening at the 2016 Toronto Japanese Film Festival
- 39th Japan Academy Film Prize for Best Art Direction, Best Sound Recording, Excellent Film, Excellent Director, Excellent Leading Actor, Excellent Screenplay, Excellent Music, Excellent Cinematography, Excellent Editing, Excellent Lighting
- VFX-JAPAN Award 2017 for Excellent Motion Picture

2020: Godai - The Wunderkind (天外者, Tengaramon)

Biographical story of Tomoatsu Godai, the influential entrepreneur of the Meiji era (starring Haruma Miura as Godai)

- Official selection at the 24th Shanghai International Film Festival
- 94th Kinema Junpo Best Ten Readers' Choice Award for Best Japanese Film, Best Japanese Director
- 34th Nikkan Sports Yujiro Ishihara Film Prize Fans' Choice Award for Best Film, Best Actor
- 13th Tokyo Shimbun Film Award
