= Ryo Sugimoto =

Japanese production designer (born 1976)

- Born: Japan
- Occupation: Production designer

Ryo Sugimoto

Japanese name
- Kanji: 杉本亮
- Kana: スギモト・リョウ
Transcriptions
- Romanization: Ryo Sugimoto

Ryo Sugimoto is a Japanese art director. Born in 1976. He is the Representative Director and President of “ROJI Co., Ltd.”. In 1997, he apprenticed under production designers Yohei Taneda and Mitsuo Harada as an art assistant. After working as a set designer on films such as "Bokoku no Aegis" (2005) and "Tokyo Tower: Mom and Me, and Sometimes Dad" (2007), he made his debut as a production designer (art director) on the 2007 film "Chameleon", directed by Junji Sakamoto.Since then, he has served as production designer (art director) on numerous productions.

He was an art director for "BABEL" (2007), directed by Alejandro Gonzalez Iñarritu, which won “the 59th Artistic Directors Society Award” for production design in 2007. In 2011, he won the Excellence in Art Direction Award at “the 34th Japan Academy Film Awards” for the film "Villain"(released September 2010), directed by Lee Sang-il. In 2014, he won the Excellence in Art Direction Award at “the 37th Japan Academy Film Awards” for the film "Unforgiven"(released September 2013), also directed by Lee Sang-il. In 2019, he won the Craft Award at “the 2019 59th ACC TOKYO CREATIVE AWARD” for the "Sumitomo Mitsui Card Company, Limited ‘Thinking Man Series’". In 2026, he won the Excellence in Art Direction Award at “the 49th Japan Academy Film” Prize for the film "SUZUKI=BAKUDAN" (released October 31, 2025), directed by Akira Nagai.

Recent projects include Akira Nagai's "Love Is Like After the Rain" (released May 2018), Director Chen Sicheng's "Detective Chinatown 3" (released Jan. 2020), Director Keishi Ōtomo's "Eiri" (released Feb. 2020), Director Kouki Mitani's "Someone Is Watching" (streamed Sept. 2020), Director Nobuhiro Doi's "I Fell in Love Like A Flower Bouquet" (released Jan. 2021), Akira Nagai's "Character" (released June 2021), Ayuko Tsukahara's "1st Kiss" (released February 7, 2025), Genki Kawamur's "Exit 8" (released August 29, 2025), and Junji Sakamoto's "Teppen no Mukou ni Anata ga Iru" (released August 29, 2025), among others.

In addition, he is active in a wide range of fields, including commercials, music videos, and interior design.

== Filmography ==
- 2001 "9 Souls" / Toshiaki Toyoda: Film director / Art director
- 2001 "KT (film)" / Junji Sakamoto: Film director / Art director
- 2003 "Lost in Translation" / Sofia Coppola: Film director / Art director
- 2003 "KONO YO NO SOTOE CLUB-SHINCHUGUN" / Junji Sakamoto: Film director / Art director
- 2004 "69" / Lee Sang-il: Film director / Art director
- 2005 "Bokoku no Aegis" / Junji Sakamoto: Film director / Art director
- 2006 "Silk" / Chae Soo-bin: Film director / Art director
- 2007 "Midnight Eagle" / Izuru Narushima: Film director / Art director
- 2007 "Tokyo Tower: Mom and Me, and Sometimes Dad" / Joji Matsuoka: Film director / Art director
- 2007 "BABEL" / Alejandro González Iñárritu: Film director / Art director
- 2007 "Chameleon" / Junji Sakamoto: Film director / Production designer
- 2008 "KANKI NO UTA" / Jōji Matsuoka: Film director / Art director
- 2008 "Map of the sounds of Tokyo" / Isabel Coixet: Film director / Production designer
- 2008 "Ultra miracle love story" Satoko Yokohama: Film director / Production designer
- 2009 "Midnight Diner (Movie)" / Jōji Matsuoka: Film director / Art director
- 2009 "Kenta & Jun & Kayo-chan no Kuni" / Tatsushi Ōmori: Film director / Production designer
- 2010 "Villain" / Lee Sang-il: Film director / Production designer
- 2011 "The Monster Club" / Toshiaki Toyoda: Film director / Production designer
- 2011 "Gaiji Keisatsu" / Kentarō Horikirizono: Film director / Production designer
- 2012 "Unforgiven" / Lee Sang-il: Film director / Production designer
- 2012 "The Wolverine" / James Mangold: Film director / JPN Art director
- 2013 "A Bolt from the Blue" / Gekidan Hitori: Film director / Production designer
- 2016 "If Cats Disappeared from the World" / Akira Nagai: Film director / Art director
- 2017 "AMY SAID" / Taishi Muramoto: Film director / Production designer
- 2017 "I hear Blue Hearts" / Lee Sang-il: Film director / Production designer
- 2018 "Love Is Like After the Rain" / Akira Nagai: Film director / Production designer
- 2018 "UTA-MONOGATARI -CINEMA FIGHTERS project- FUNKY" / Yuuya Ishii: Film director / Production designer
- 2020 "Detective Chinatown 3" / Chen Sicheng: Film director / Production designer
- 2020 "Eiri" / Keishi Ōtomo: Film director / Production designer
- 2020 "DAREKA GA, MITEIRU" / Kouki Mitani: Film director / Art director
- 2021 "I Fell in Love Like A Flower Bouquet" / Nobuhiro Doi: Film director/ Art director
- 2021 "Character" / Akira Nagai: Film director / Art director
- 2025 "1ST KISS" / Ayuko Tsukahara: Film director / Art director
- 2025 "Exit 8" / Genki Kawamura: Film director / Art director
- 2025 "Teppen no Mukou ni Anata ga Iru" / Junji Sakamoto: Film director / Art director
- 2025 "SUZUKI=BAKUDAN" / Akira Nagai: Film director / Art director

== Interior design ==
- "Bar Salon de Shimaji" / Bar / Japan, Nishiazabu, Minato-ku / Designer
- "Bar El Laguito" / Bar / Japan, Arakicho, Shinjuku-ku / Yotsuya 3-chome / Designer
- "BAR ENISI" / Bar / Japan, Kitamachi, Nerima-ku / Designer
- "Bar DICE" / Bar / Japan, Ginza, Chuo-ku / Designer
- "STAR BAR" / Bar / Japan, Ginza, Chuo-ku / Designer
- "BILLY" / Bar / Japan, Arakichō, Shinjuku-ku / Shinjuku Golden Gai / Designer
- "Ne Plus Ultra -Ginza-" / Bar / Japan, Ginza, Chuo-ku / Designer
- "Bar Jusakon" / Bar / Japan, Minami-ku, Sagamihara-shi, Kanagawa / Designer
- "Bar HAGURUMA" / Bar / Japan, Wakamiya-cho, Shinjuku-ku / Kagurazaka / Designer
- "Bar La Hulotte" / Bar / Japan, Motomabu, Minato-ku / Designer
- "-Fish Market lunch- TOTOKICHI" / Washoku / Japan, Shinjuku 3-chome, Shinjuku-ku / Designer
- "Ne Plus Ultra -Roppongi-" / Bar / Japan, Roppongi, Minato-ku / Designer
- "Le Parrain -2-" / Bar / Japan, Shinjuku 3-chome, Shinjuku-ku / Assistant designer
- "Wine Bar Fleur Blanc" / Wine Bar / Japan, Shinjuku 3-chome, Shinjuku-ku / Assistant designer
