= Kenichi Takitō =

Japanese actor (born 1976)

- 滝藤 賢一
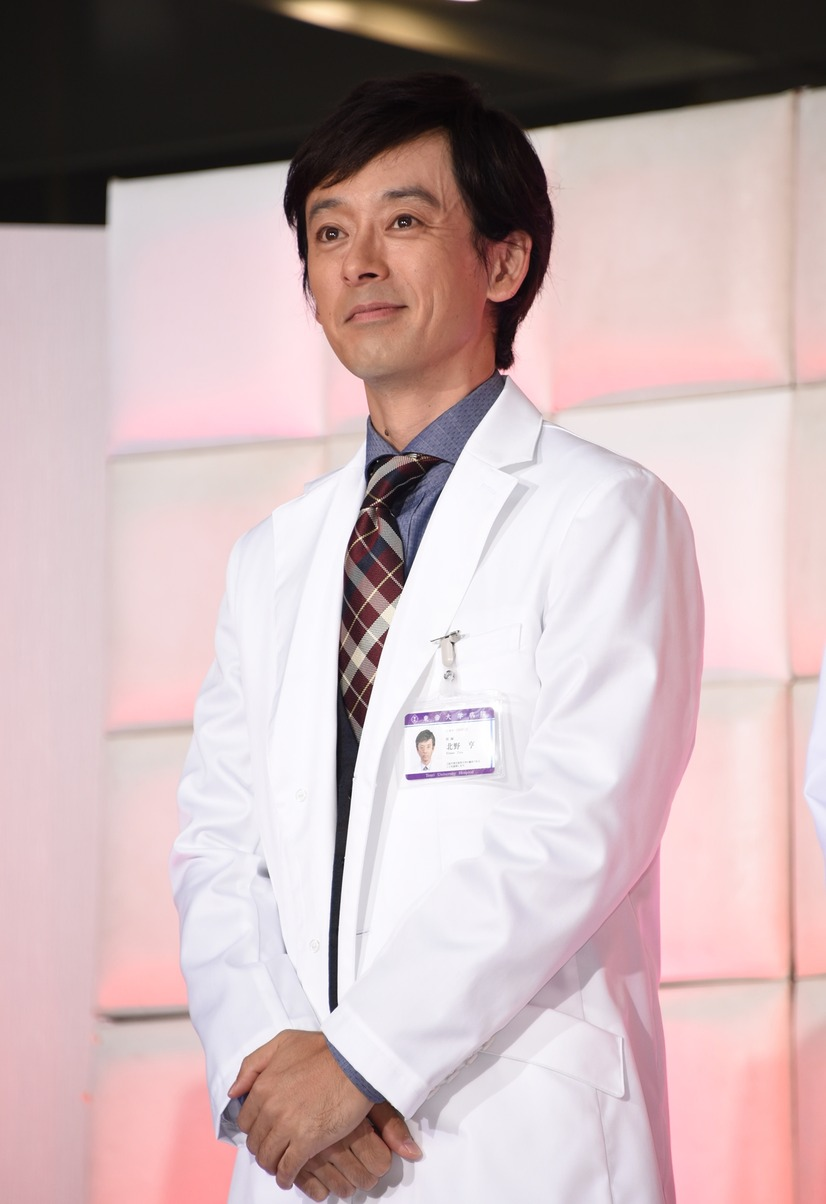
- Born: November 2, 1976 (age 49); Nagoya, Aichi, Japan
- Occupation: Actor
- Years active: 1998–present
- Agent: Agent Office Tact
- Children: 4

Kenichi Takitō (滝藤 賢一, Takitō Ken'ichi; born November 2, 1976 in Nagoya) is a Japanese actor.

== Career ==
Takitō belonged to Tatsuya Nakadai's acting academy and theater troupe Mumeijuku from 1998 to 2007.

== Filmography ==
=== Films ===
- Godzilla: Tokyo S.O.S. (2003)
- Climber's High (2009), Shusaku Kanzawa
- Fish Story (2009), A rapist
- Golden Slumber (2010)
- Wandering Home (2010)
- Lesson of the Evil (2012)
- Seiji: Riku no Sakana (2012), Makoto
- Bayside Shakedown: The Final (2012), Wang Mingcai
- Unforgiven (2013), Yasaburō Himeji
- Rurouni Kenshin: Kyoto Inferno (2014), Hoji Sadojima
- Love’s Whirlpool (2014), A salaryman
- Rurouni Kenshin: The Legend Ends (2014), Hoji Sadojima
- Bilocation (2014)
- 64: Part I (2016), Akama
- 64: Part II (2016), Akama
- The Inerasable (2016), Naoto
- Scoop! (2016), Baba
- Sekigahara (2017), Toyotomi Hideyoshi
- Enokida Trading Post (2018)
- The Blood of Wolves (2018), Daisuke Saga
- Rainbow Days (2018)
- Kamen Rider Heisei Generations Forever (2018), Futaros (voice)
- The 47 Ronin in Debt (2019)
- Show Me the Way to the Station (2019)
- Shadowfall (2019)
- First Love (2019)
- The Confidence Man JP: Episode of the Princess (2020)
- The Night Beyond the Tricornered Window (2021)
- Remain in Twilight (2021)
- Last of the Wolves (2021), Daisuke Saga
- The Way of the Househusband (2022), Torajiro
- Natchan's Little Secret (2023)
- Don't Call It Mystery: The Movie (2023), Wataru Kariatsumari
- The Young Strangers (2024)
- The Hotel of My Dream (2024)
- The Girl Who Sees (2025), Mamoru Yotsuya
- Frontline: Yokohama Bay (2025), Miyata
- Stigmatized Properties: Possession (2025), Yamanaka
- Purehearted (2025), Jin'yu Senaha
- Samurai Vengeance (2026), Sagara Yosaburo
- I Don't Know You(2026), Zen'ichi Machimura
- A Distant Neighborhood (2026), Yoshio Nakahara
- The Village of Eight Gravestones (2026), Hisaya Tajimi and Yozo Tajimi
- Bayside Shakedown: N.E.W (2026), Wang Mingcai

=== Television ===
- Bio Planet WoO (2006)
- Bloody Monday (2008), Shirota
- Ryōmaden (2010), Komatsu Tatewaki
- Doctor Ume (2012)
- Amachan (2013)
- Naoki Hanzawa (2013), Naosuke Kondo
- Border (2014), Suzuki
- Sleepeeer Hit! (2016)
- Yūsha Yoshihiko (2016), Robin
- The Supporting Actors (2017), Himself
- Black Leather Notebook (2017), Tōru Murai
- Border 2 Redemption (2017), Suzuki
- Half Blue Sky (2018)
- Boys Over Flowers Season 2 (2018), Iwao Kaguragi
- Miss Sherlock (2018), Inspector Gentaro Reimon
- Princess Jellyfish (2018), Mejiro Juon
- Awaiting Kirin (2020–21), Ashikaga Yoshiaki
- The Way of the Househusband (2020), Torajiro
- The Supporting Actors 3 (2021), Himself
- Love You as the World Ends (2021), Koki Shuto
- Friendship: Seiji Hirao and Shinya Yamanaka (2023), Shinya Yamanaka
- YuYu Hakusho (2023), Elder Toguro
- The Tiger and Her Wings (2024), Kōshirō Takigawa
- Queen of Mars (2025), Kitamura

=== Anime ===
- Sushi & Beyond: What the Japanese Know About Cooking (2015), Toshi
- Kanashiki Debu Neko-chan (2021), Maru

=== Stage ===
- The Merry Wives of Windsor (2001), Bardolph
- Death of a Salesman (2002), Stanley

=== Video games ===
- Judgment (2018), Kazuya Ayabe

=== Dubbing ===
- Alice Through the Looking Glass, Time (Sacha Baron Cohen)
- Miles Ahead, Miles Davis (Don Cheadle)
