= Scoop! =

- Poster
- Directed by: Hitoshi Ōne
- Screenplay by: Hitoshi Ōne
- Produced by: Akihiro Yamauchi; Ryūji Ichiyama; Yasuhiro Masaoka; Wataru Takano
- Starring: Masaharu Fukuyama; Fumi Nikaidō; Yō Yoshida; Kenichi Takitō; Lily Franky
- Cinematography: Gen Kobayashi
- Edited by: Yasuyuki Ozeki
- Music by: Hiroshi Kawanabe
- Distributed by: Toho
- Release date: October 1, 2016 (Japan)
- Running time: 120 minutes
- Country: Japan
- Language: Japanese
- Box office: ¥156.1 million

Scoop! is a 2016 Japanese suspense comedy drama film directed by Hitoshi Ōne and starring Masaharu Fukuyama. It was released in Japan by Toho on October 1, 2016.

== Cast ==
- Masaharu Fukuyama as Shizuka Miyakonojō
- Fumi Nikaidō as Nobi Namekawa
- Yō Yoshida as Sadako Yokokawa
- Kenichi Takitō as Baba
- Lily Franky as Charagen
- Takumi Saito
- Shinya Tsukamoto
- Ren Ishikawa

== Reception ==
The film was fourth placed on its opening weekend in Japan, with 127,542 admissions and ¥156.1 million in gross.
