= Haru Kuroki =

Japanese actress (born 1990)

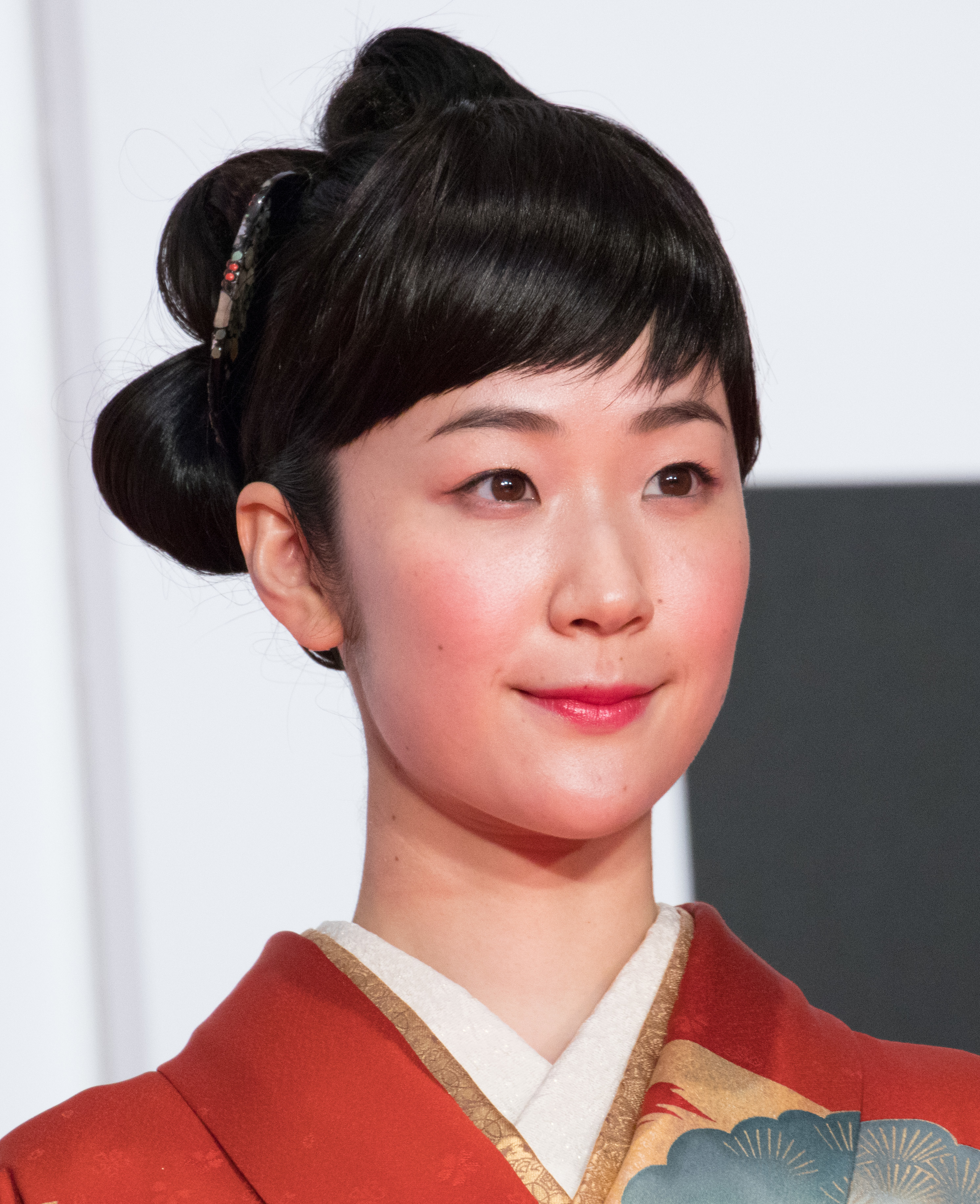
- Kuroki at the 2016 Tokyo International Film Festival
- Born: March 14, 1990 (age 36); Takatsuki, Osaka, Japan
- Occupation: Actress
- Years active: 2010–present

Haru Kuroki (黒木 華, Kuroki Haru; born March 14, 1990) is a Japanese actress. She won the Silver Bear for Best Actress for her performance in the film The Little House.

== Filmography ==
=== Film ===
Year	Title	Role	Notes	Ref.
2011	Tokyo Oasis	Yasuko		
2012	Wolf Children	Yuki (voice)		
2012	Bungo: Sasayaka na Yokubō	Ayako		
2013	A Chair on the Plains	Yayoi Toma		
2013	The Great Passage	Midori Kishibe		
2013	The Flower of Shanidar	Kyoko Mitsuki	Lead role	
2013	Don't Lose Heart	Young Shizuko Shibata		
2014	The Little House	Taki Nunomiya		
2014	Silver Spoon	Ayame Minamikujō		
2015	A Stitch of Life	Yōko		
2015	The Case of Hana & Alice	Ogino (voice)		
2015	The Curtain Rises	Misako Yoshioka		
2015	Solomon's Perjury Part 1: Suspicion	Emiko Moriuchi		
2015	Solomon's Perjury Part 2: Judgement	Emiko Moriuchi		
2015	The Boy and the Beast	Young Ichirōhiko (voice)		
2015	Nagasaki: Memories of My Son	Machiko Sata		
2016	A Bride for Rip Van Winkle	Nanami Minakawa	Lead role	
2016	Emiabi no Hajimari to Hajimari	Natsumi		
2016	The Long Excuse	Fukunaga		
2016	Fueled: The Man They Called Pirate	Hatsumi Ogawa		
2017	To Each His Own	Miki Igarashi		
2017	Lear of the Beach	Nobuko		
2018	Mirai	Mirai (voice)		
2018	Samurai's Promise	Satomi Sakashita		
2018	Every Day a Good Day	Noriko	Lead role	
2018	The Antique	Shioriko Shinokawa	Lead role	
2018	It Comes	Kana Tahara		
2018	Million Dollar Man	Masako Ōkura		
2020	My Sweet Grappa Remedies	Wakabayashi-chan		
2020	The Asadas	Wakana Kawakami		
2020	Under the Stars	Shōko		
2021	Sensei, Would You Sit Beside Me?	Sawako	Lead role	
2022	Noise	Kana Izumi		
2022	The Last 10 Years	Kikyō		
2023	Ichikei's Crow: The Movie	Chizuru Sakama		
2023	The Village	Misaki		
2023	Okiku and the World	Okiku	Lead role	
2023	Kyrie	Fumi Teraishi		
2023	Fly On	Eri		
2024	Gold Boy	Kaori Amuro		
2024	18×2 Beyond Youthful Days	Yukiko	Taiwanese-Japanese film	
2024	Hakkenden: Fiction and Reality	Omichi		
2024	Aimitagai	Azusa	Lead role	
2025	Gosh!!			
2026	The Brightest Sun	Tamie		
2026	Magical Secret Tour	Kiyoe		
2026	F(r)iction	Mera		
2026	The Day After Sunday	Mai	Lead role	
2027	Sins of Kujo: The Movie	Kanako Kujo		

=== Television ===
Year	Title	Role	Notes	Ref.
2012–2013	Jun and Ai	Chika Tanabe	Asadora	
2013	Mahoro Ekimae Bangaichi	Yukari Miyamoto	Episode 8	
2013	Legal High 2	Jane Honda		
2013	Tales of the Unusual: Autumn 2013	Haruka Nagamine	Short drama	
2014	Hanako and Anne	Kayo Ando	Asadora	
2014	Hanako and Anne spin-off: Asaichi no Yomesan	Kayo Ando	Television film	
2014–16	Gou Gou, The Cat	Minami	2 seasons	
2015	Murder on the Orient Express	Sayuri Miki	Two-part television special	
2015	The Emperor's Cook	Toshiko Takahama		
2016	Sanada Maru	Ume	Taiga drama	
2016	Sleepeeer Hit!	Kokoro Kurosawa	Lead role	
2017	Mio Tsukushi Ryōri-chō	Mio	Lead role	
2018	Segodon	Ito Iwayama	Taiga drama	
2019	Nagi's Long Vacation	Nagi Ōshima	Lead role	
2020	Cold Case Season 3		Episode 7	
2021	Ichikei's Crow: The Criminal Court Judges	Chizuru Sakama		
2022	Modern Love Tokyo	Tamami Sakurai (voice)	Lead role; episode 7	
2023	Worst to First: A Teen Baseball Miracle	Kanako Yamazumi		
2024	Dear Radiance	Minamoto no Tomoko	Taiga drama	
2026	The Light We Cast	Matsuri Hoshino	Lead role	

== Awards and nominations ==
Year	Award	Category	Nominated work(s)	Result	Ref.
2013	5th Tama Movie Awards	Best New Actress	A Chair on the Plains, The Great Passage and The Flower of Shanidar	Won	
2013	26th Nikkan Sports Film Awards	Best Newcomer	A Chair on the Plains and The Great Passage	Won	
2014	37th Japan Academy Film Prize	Newcomer of the Year	A Chair on the Plains and The Great Passage	Won	
2014	23rd Tokyo Sports Film Awards	Best Newcomer	A Chair on the Plains and The Great Passage	Won	
2014	56th Blue Ribbon Awards	Best Newcomer	A Chair on the Plains, The Great Passage, and The Flower of Shanidar	Won	
2014	87th Kinema Junpo Awards	Best New Actress	A Chair on the Plains, The Great Passage and others	Won	
2014	35th Yokohama Film Festival	Best New Actress	A Chair on the Plains, The Great Passage and others	Won	
2014	23rd Japanese Movie Critics Awards	Best Newcomer	A Chair on the Plains	Won	
2014	64th Berlin International Film Festival	Silver Bear for Best Actress	The Little House	Won	
2015	38th Japan Academy Film Prize	Best Supporting Actress	The Little House	Won	
2015	8th Tokyo Drama Awards	Best Actress	The Emperor's Cook	Won	
2016	39th Japan Academy Film Prize	Best Supporting Actress	Nagasaki: Memories of My Son	Won	
2016	89th Kinema Junpo Awards	Best Supporting Actress	Nagasaki: Memories of My Son, The Curtain Rises and Solomon's Perjury	Won	
2017	59th Blue Ribbon Awards	Best Actress	A Bride for Rip Van Winkle	Nominated	
2017	40th Japan Academy Film Prize	Best Actress	A Bride for Rip Van Winkle	Nominated	
2017	11th Asian Film Awards	Best Actress	A Bride for Rip Van Winkle	Nominated	
2017	26th Japanese Professional Movie Awards	Best Actress	A Bride for Rip Van Winkle	Won	
2017	32nd Takasaki Film Festival	Best Supporting Actress	Lear of the Beach	Won	
2018	60th Blue Ribbon Awards	Best Supporting Actress	Lear of the Beach	Nominated	
2018	31st Nikkan Sports Film Awards	Best Actress	Every Day a Good Day and The Antique	Nominated	
2019	73rd Mainichi Film Awards	Best Actress	Every Day a Good Day	Nominated	
2019	61st Blue Ribbon Awards	Best Actress	Every Day a Good Day	Nominated	
2019	42nd Japan Academy Film Prize	Best Actress	Every Day a Good Day	Nominated	
2019	12th Tokyo Drama Awards	Best Supporting Actress	Weakest Beast	Won	
2020	13th Tokyo Drama Awards	Best Actress	Nagi's Long Vacation	Won	
2020	33rd Nikkan Sports Film Awards	Best Supporting Actress	The Asadas	Nominated	
2021	63rd Blue Ribbon Awards	Best Supporting Actress	The Asadas	Nominated	
2021	44th Japan Academy Film Prize	Best Supporting Actress	The Asadas	Won	
2023	36th Nikkan Sports Film Awards	Best Supporting Actress	The Village and others	Nominated	
2024	78th Mainichi Film Awards	Best Actress	Okiku and the World	Nominated	
2024	45th Yokohama Film Festival	Best Actress	Okiku and the World	Won	
2024	66th Blue Ribbon Awards	Best Supporting Actress	The Village and others	Nominated	
