= Satoru Matsuo =

Japanese actor

- 松尾 諭
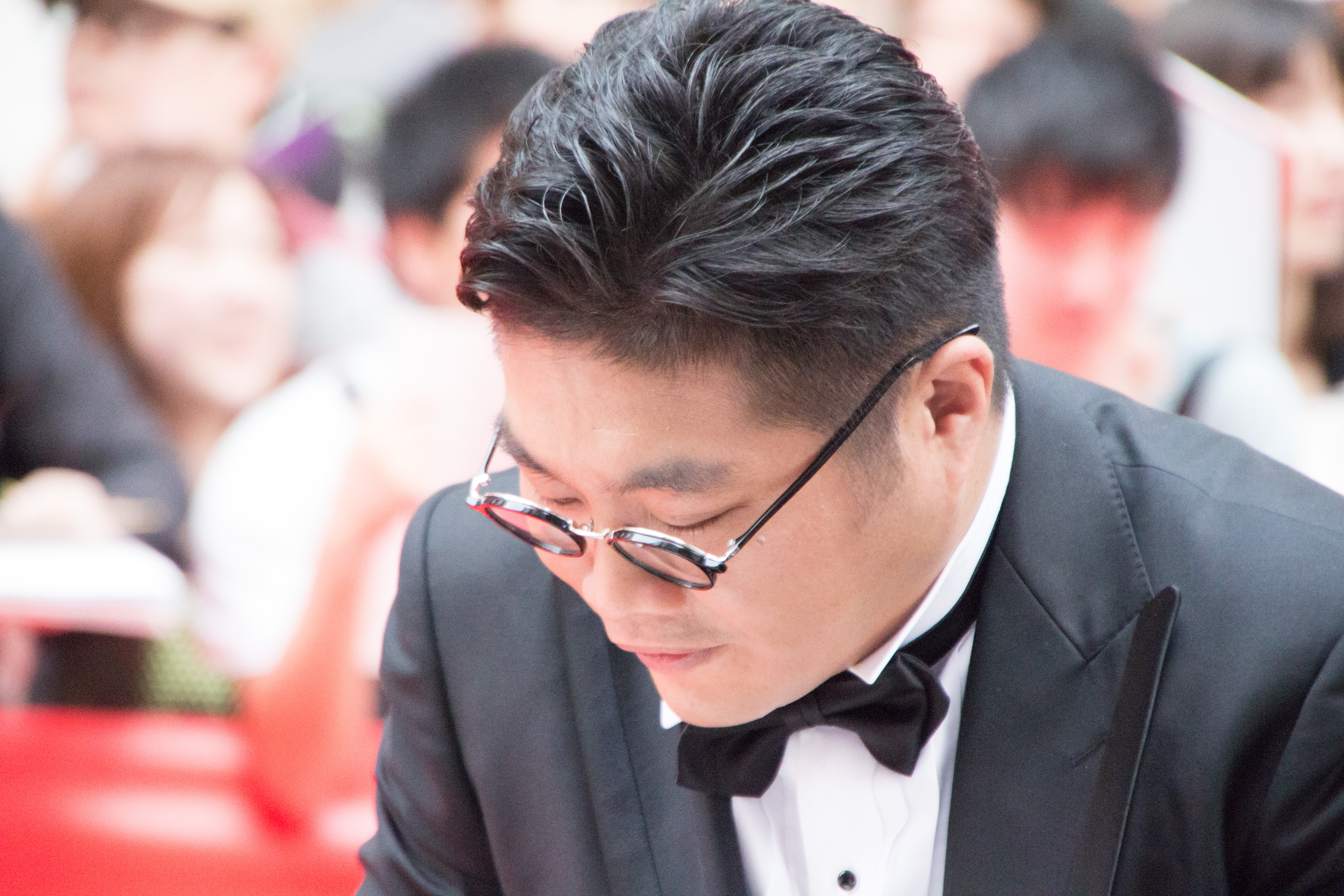
- Born: December 7, 1975 (age 50); Amagasaki, Hyogo Prefecture, Japan
- Occupation: Actor
- Years active: 2000 - present
- Website: 松尾 諭｜FMG

Satoru Matsuo (松尾 諭, Matsuo Satoru; born December 7, 1975) is a Japanese actor and voice actor, known for starring in Shin Godzilla, Attack on Titan, and Attack on Titan: End of the World. A television series based on Matsuo's life titled Lost Man Found was released in 2022.

== Filmography ==
=== Film ===
Year	Title	Role	Notes	Ref(s)
2000	Not Forgotten	Japanese soldier		
2010	SP: The Motion Picture	Takafumi Yamamoto		
2011	SP: The Motion Picture II	Takafumi Yamamoto		
2015	Attack on Titan	Sannagi		
2015	Attack on Titan: End of the World	Sannagi		
2016	Shin Godzilla	Shūichi Izumi		
2020	Food Luck	Tatsuya Furuyama		
2022	Ox-Head Village			
2022	Cherry Magic! the Movie	Kusumoto		
2023	We Make Antiques! Osaka Dreams			
2024	Amalock			
2024	Sana: Let Me Hear	Nakamura		
2024	11 Rebels			
2025	Teki Cometh			
2025	Bullet Train Explosion	Masayoshi Goto		
2025	The Last Man: The Movie – First Love	Yoshiharu Manome		
2026	Guilt			

=== Television ===
Year	Title	Role	Notes	Ref(s)
2005	Train Man	Thespa		
2007–08	SP	Takafumi Yamamoto		
2010–11	Teppan	Tōru Nakaoka	Asadora	
2011	Tenchijin	Sakurai Yoshiharu	Taiga drama	
2017	Bloom	Jirō Mashiko	Asadora	
2018	Warotenka	Shirō Kawakami, Ririko's partner	Asadora	
2020	Yell	Renpei Suzuki	Asadora	
2022	Lost Man Found	Himself		
2022–23	Maiagare!	Yoshiharu Mochizuki	Asadora	
2023	A Day-Off of Hana Sugisaki	Tsubakihara		
2023	The Last Man: The Blind Profiler	Yoshiharu Manome		
2024	Tokyo Swindlers			
2025	Last Samurai Standing			
2026	Brothers in Arms	Osawa Jirozaemon	Taiga drama	
2026	Grass for My Pillow	Seiichiro Sakai	Television film	

=== Dubbing roles ===
Title	Role	Voice dub for	Notes	Ref(s)
Godzilla: King of the Monsters	Officer Barnes	O'Shea Jackson Jr.		
