= Attack on Titan (film) =

2015 Japanese film by Shinji Higuchi

- Theatrical release poster
- Directed by: Shinji Higuchi
- Screenplay by: Yūsuke Watanabe; Tomohiro Machiyama
- Based on: Attack on Titan by Hajime Isayama
- Produced by: Minami Ichikawa; Akihiro Yamauchinv; Yoshihiro Sato
- Starring: Haruma Miura; Hiroki Hasegawa; Kiko Mizuhara; Kanata Hongō
- Cinematography: Shoji Ehara
- Edited by: Yusuke Ishida
- Music by: Shirō Sagisu
- Production company: Toho Pictures
- Distributed by: Toho
- Release dates: 14 July 2015 (Part I Grauman's Egyptian Theatre); 1 August 2015 (Part I Japan); 19 September 2015 (Part II Japan)
- Running time: 98 minutes (Part I); 87 minutes (Part II)
- Country: Japan
- Language: Japanese
- Box office: $46 million (Note: This is the combined worldwide box office total for both parts. Part I grossed US$30.8 million and Part II grossed US$15.2 million.)

Attack on Titan (Japanese: 進撃の巨人, Hepburn: Shingeki no Kyojin) is a 2015 Japanese post-apocalyptic action film based on the manga of the same name by Hajime Isayama. The film is directed by Shinji Higuchi, written by Yūsuke Watanabe and Tomohiro Machiyama and stars Haruma Miura, Hiroki Hasegawa, Kiko Mizuhara, Kanata Hongō, Takahiro Miura, Nanami Sakuraba, Satoru Matsuo, Shu Watanabe, Ayame Misaki, Rina Takeda, Satomi Ishihara, Pierre Taki and Jun Kunimura.

In the film, Eren Jaeger and his childhood friends Mikasa Ackerman and Armin Arlert join the Survey Corps, a military corporation to fight gigantic humanoids called the Titans after their hometown is attacked by a Colossal Titan. The film is split into two parts, with the first part released in Japan on 1 August 2015 and the second part (subtitled End of the World) released on 19 September that year.

The film received mixed to somewhat negative reviews from critics, who praised the Titans designs and the B-movie style, but criticized the script and deviations from the source material.

== Plot ==
=== Part 1 ===
One hundred years ago, the Titans appeared and decimated most of humanity. To stop their advance, humanity built a series of walls and continued to live in peace. In the present day village of Monzen, Eren expresses to his friends, Armin and Mikasa, his desire to leave the confines of the Outer Wall and see the outside world. After a failed attempt to approach the wall, Souda, the captain of the Garrison, explains to them that the military is assembling a scouting regiment to explore beyond the walls. However, the wall is suddenly attacked by the Colossal Titan. The wall is breached and Titans enter the village, eating people and regenerating when injured. When Mikasa tries to rescue a baby, she is separated from Eren, and is presumed killed.

Two years later, Eren and Armin enter the Scout Regiment, along with Sasha, Jean, and others. The team, led by Military Police Commander Kubal, move out into one of the towns of the Outer Wall. The group is then attacked by Titans but are saved by Captain Shikishima and Mikasa, who survived the attack from two years ago and is now part of the Scouts. Mikasa refuses to talk to Eren, acting like he is a stranger for no reason. Eren eventually confronts Mikasa and she reveals to him that the experience made her realize the world is cruel. After realizing that Mikasa and Shikishima are most likely together, Eren is once again devastated.

When more Titans surprise them, Kubal retreats, leaving the Scouts to fend for themselves. Lil, who had just lost her lover, sacrifices herself. Jean attempts to convince Eren to flee, but Eren chooses to fight back before losing his arm in the process. Eren manages to save Armin from being eaten but at the cost of his own life. Though crushed by Eren's death, Mikasa fights until she runs low on fuel and comes face-to-face with the same Titan that ate Eren. However, a Titan emerges from within it and begins battling the other Titans. Souda and Mikasa realize that the Titan is Eren. After he starts to collapse, Mikasa frees Eren from his Titan shell.

=== Part 2 ===
Years before, a young Eren is forcibly injected with an experimental serum by his father, but soon after Eren's mother discovers this, a military police squad break in, taking Eren's parents and burning the place. Eren survives with the help of Souda. In the present, Eren is captured by Kubal and his squadron, believing he is a threat to humanity. Mikasa does nothing to defend him. Armin and Souda try to persuade Kubal to spare Eren's life, but Souda is killed. Before Eren is executed, a Titan busts in, killing Kubal and his squadron, takes Eren, but spares Mikasa and her comrades.

Eren awakens in a mysterious bunker with Shikishima, who reveals the origins of the Titans as a military experiment gone wrong that soon developed into a virus that turned people into Titans and decimated humanity. Shikishima plans to launch a coup against the corrupted government who has been oppressing its people with the walls and with fear of the Titans. Eren learns that Shikishima has stockpiled some of the pre-Titan War weapons, and agrees to help.

Hange, Mikasa and the others retrieve an undetonated bomb in Eren's hometown with the hopes of using it to seal the outer wall. They encounter Shikishima's troops and reunite with Eren. However, Shikishima attempts to recruit them into his coup, revealing that he plans to use the dud bomb not to seal the wall but to blow up the capital and let the Titans overtake everything, freeing humanity. Realizing that more innocent lives would be shed, Eren stands against Shikishima. As they fight, Sannagi sacrifices himself to bring down a nearby tower that falls on the weapon stockpile, blowing it up while the others escape with the bomb. However, Shikishima reappears on the truck and stabs himself revealing himself to be the Titan that took Eren earlier. The gang attack Shikishima, who smashes Eren into a wall, but Eren transforms into his Titan form and defeats Shikishima. Titan Eren climbs the wall and plants the bomb, reverting to his human form while Armin sets the fuse.

Having survived the earlier attack, Kubal wants the group to give up Eren and return to the interior, but they refuse. Kubal shoots Armin, but is shot by Sasha and falls, transforming into the Colossal Titan which actually breached the outer wall in part 1. Mikasa and Jean try to jump on the Colossal Titan's back. The bomb does not go off, so Mikasa tries to get the bomb fuse working again, but is confronted by Shikishima. Eren tries to break into the Colossal Titan's nape but is knocked down. Shikishima sacrifices himself by transforming into a Titan and lodging the bomb into the Colossal Titan's mouth. The detonation successfully closes the hole in the wall and Eren and Mikasa stand at the top of the wall overlooking the ocean.

In a post-credits scene, footage of the battle with the Colossal Titan is analyzed, in Shikishima's bunker, by an off-screen character, who says that Eren and Mikasa's unpredictability is what makes them "fascinating".

== Cast ==
Character	Actor	English Dub Voice Actor	Note	Ref(s)
Eren Jaeger	Haruma Miura	Bryce Papenbrook	A young man who dreams of one day leaving the walls.	
Mikasa Ackerman	Kiko Mizuhara	Trina Nishimura	Eren's childhood friend. It was thought that she had been killed in the initial wall breach at Monzen, but she reappears as part of the Scout Regiment under Shikishima.	
Shikishima	Hiroki Hasegawa	Jason Liebrecht	The captain of the Scout Regiment.	
Armin Arlert	Kanata Hongō	Josh Grelle	Eren's childhood friend. He has an interest in mechanical stuff.	
Jean Kirstein	Takahiro Miura	Mike McFarland	A soldier who gets into a scuffle with Eren.	
Sasha Braus	Nanami Sakuraba	Ashly Burch	A soldier who enjoys food, especially potatoes. She uses a long bow.	
Sannagi	Satoru Matsuo	Cris George	A soldier who uses an axe to cut the heels of the Titans.	
Fukushi	Shu Watanabe	James Chandler	One of the soldiers.	
Hiana	Ayame Misaki	Felecia Angelle	One of the female soldiers. It is later revealed she joined the Scouts in order to provide for her daughter. She appeared to have had a crush on Eren and attempted to seduce him. Later, she is eaten by a titan.	
Lil	Rina Takeda	Tia Ballard	One of the female soldiers, she and another soldier are a couple.	
Souda	Pierre Taki	Cris George	A former captain in the Garrison when the walls are breached at Monzen.	
Hange Zoe	Satomi Ishihara	Jessica Calvello	The weapons chief and a leader in the Scout Regiment. She typically wears goggles and first appears where she demonstrates the omni-directional mobility gear.	
Kubal	Jun Kunimura	R. Bruce Elliott	The director in the military forces.	

Some characters that were featured in the original manga and anime were dropped due to the film's setting having been changed from one primarily influenced by Germany to an obvious analogue to Japan. The character voices for the Funimation English dub are the same as those in the anime.

== Production ==
=== Development ===
The film was announced in October 2011, with a planned release date in 2013 and in December of the same year it was announced that it would be a live action film and that Tetsuya Nakashima would direct. In December 2012 it was announced that Nakashima had left as director because of creative differences. Originally, the filmmakers wanted to make the film very faithful to the source material, but author Hajime Isayama suggested numerous changes (such as introducing new and different characters, and changing the setting to Japan) to make the films standalone, because "the story has already been told", while also introducing new elements that would later be used in the manga.

=== Filming ===
Principal photography was expected to start in 2014 and the film was now expected to be released in 2015. A car commercial featuring the Titans and directed by Higuchi was also announced and broadcast in January 2014 on Nippon TV, reaching more than 5 million views on YouTube in four days. Haruma Miura was revealed as part of the cast in April and in July it was announced that there would be two films. The first images of the actors in character were revealed in November.

=== Music ===
Shirō Sagisu composed and scored an original motion-picture soundtrack, which compiled into one whole soundtrack. The theme songs of the films are "Anti-Hero" and "SOS", respectively, both performed by Sekai no Owari. The film's soundtrack goes under the name "Attack on Titan (Shinji Higuchi's Original Motion Picture Soundtrack)".

All music is composed by Shirō Sagisu.

No.	Title	Length
1.	"Le soleil d'or"	1:55
2.	"War Song"	3:20
3.	"Masterplan (Metalopera)"	5:21
4.	"God Have Mercy"	4:17
5.	"Rise Up (Rhythmetal)"	5:09
6.	"Manicure"	2:03
7.	"Boule de cristal (Piano)"	2:57
8.	"For the Dead"	3:40
9.	"Die Die Die Die!"	3:39
10.	"Temper the Wind"	4:14
11.	"Orchestre (Lent)"	3:57
12.	"Deuxième ouverture"	3:49
13.	"Rise Up"	4:04
14.	"War, Politics and Power"	5:17
15.	"Attack of Titans"	2:37
16.	"Orchestre (Géant à l'est)"	5:25
17.	"ATM (Rhythmetal)"	4:36
18.	"Orchestra (Apogée)"	5:52
19.	"Golden Sun"	5:01
20.	"Boule de cristal (Épilogue d'orchestre)"	2:24
Total length:		79:30

== Release ==
The first film was released in Japan on 1 August 2015. It was released by Madman Entertainment in Australia and New Zealand on 27 August 2015. Funimation Entertainment has licensed the rights for both films in North America, Central America, and South America and hosted the world premiere of the first film on 14 July at Grauman's Egyptian Theatre in Los Angeles, California. Director Shinji Higuchi and stars Haruma Miura and Kiko Mizuhara attended the red carpet premiere. Funimation had announced its screening dates for the films. Attack on Titan: Part 1 screened in a limited engagement beginning on 30 September 2015 and Attack on Titan: Part 2 screened three weeks later on 20 October 2015. The second part, entitled End of the World, was released on 19 September 2015. It was released on 1–7 October for Australia and New Zealand. The second film did poorly at the Japanese box office, relative to the first part - the first film made $4.8 million in its opening week at the Japanese box office, and the second did $2.7 million.

For its DVD and Blu-ray release in the United States, which included English dubs of both films, Part 1 was released on 4 October 2016 and Part 2 released on 6 December 2016.

=== Novelization ===
A novelizations of the films called Attack on Titan: End of the World, written by Touji Asakura was released in Japan on 23 September 2015, and in the United States on 22 November 2016.

=== Marketing ===
A teaser trailer was released in March 2015 and a trailer was released in April. Another trailer was released in June, which revealed that the film will be given an IMAX release in Japan and internationally.

== Reception ==
=== Box office ===
Part I was number-one on its opening weekend, with US$5.1 million. It was the seventh highest-grossing Japanese made film at the Japanese box office in 2015, with ¥3.25 billion (US$27 million). and the 17th highest-grossing film at the Japanese box office for that year. Part II underperformed at the box-office, having grossed ¥2.1 billion less than the total gross of the first film within first three weeks of release. Combined, the films have grossed ¥4.93 billion ($46 million).

=== Critical reception ===
On Rotten Tomatoes, 47% of critics have given Attack on Titan: Part 1 a positive review based on 15 reviews, with an average rating of 6.3/10. 50% of critics have given Part 2 a positive review based on 8 reviews, with an average rating of 6/10.

Lee Edmund of South China Morning Post wrote, "One of the most perversely original fantasy movies in recent memory, this adaptation of a Japanese manga series is a schizophrenic mix of genres." Hope Chapman of Anime News Network praised the film, stating, "Outstanding and immersive aesthetic unlike any other horror movie, swiftly paced and gripping start to finish, sharp script with heavy thematic undertones, holds up completely as its own work of art divorced from the source material." Derek Elley of Film Business Asia gave it a 7 out of 10 rating and called it "a trash-horror fantasy that's a big-budget B picture."

Other critics gave more mixed reviews to the film. Piera Chen of The Hollywood Reporter called the film "a visually refreshing blockbuster", noting that the character work film was, "undermined by hackneyed characterizations". The Guardian writer Chris Michael was also mixed on the film, calling the acting, "self-conscious and dreadful", but praising the effects and the B-movie feel of the production.

In a more negative review, Brian Ashcraft of Kotaku criticized the film for its changes from the anime, which he felt made the film worse, and described the opening scenes as "painfully melodramatic, badly acted, and wrought with corny dialogue". IGN writer Miranda Sanchez also gave the film a negative review, calling it, "a lesser version of the existing story", and criticizing the simplification of key characters.

==== Response from the creators ====
SFX artist Yoshihiro Nishimura and director Shinji Higuchi responded to some critics, with Nishimura responding to unfavourable comparisons of the film's special effects with Hollywood's standards thus: "I'm sorry, but deciding what movies to see based on their budget, and comparing everything to Hollywood, that's like how some people feel secure buying Okame natto when they go to the supermarket". Higuchi referenced one critic of the film's characters, saying "who's the idiot who gave this guy an early release of the film?!"

=== Technical difficulties ===
Attack on Titan: Part 1 received criticism from San Francisco, Ohio, Kentucky, Texas, and Wisconsin theater attendees due to a subtitle ("I've been waiting for this day!") freezing in the first ten minutes of the film and continued to stay frozen for a majority of the film due to a software problem. As a consequence, Funimation announced that they would hardsub Part 2 and all future releases. However, others have reported the subtitles working properly in other theaters. Funimation has reported that fewer than 2% of theaters have been affected by the freeze.

=== Russia bans ===
In July 2021, the Oktyabrsky District Court in Saint Petersburg banned the film along with some Happy Tree Friends, Mortal Kombat Legends: Scorpion's Revenge, based on anime, claiming that the film "can harm children’s mental health and spiritual and moral development."

== Remake ==
In January 2017, it was reported that Warner Bros. was in negotiations to secure the film rights to the Attack on Titan franchise. Harry Potter film series producer David Heyman would be on board to produce a proposed two-film project that would remake the 2015 Japanese live-action film adaptations. However, the following day, a Kodansha representative denied this report, but said there were other projects in negotiations. In October of the same year, Warner Bros. finalized a deal with Kodansha. It was announced that Andy Muschietti will direct the Attack on Titan live action remake, along with Heyman, Masi Oka, and Barbara Muschietti (the director's sister) to produce. However, in November 2023, Muschietti left the project due to scheduling conflicts.

The directors that are being considered are Louis Leterrier, David Yates, Gore Verbinski, Guy Ritchie, Michael Sarnoski and Takashi Yamazaki.

== Other media ==
Actor Satoru Matsuo's experience as a cast member in the film was depicted in the 2022 biographical television series Lost Man Found, where he was portrayed by David Chen.
