= Godai Tomoatsu =

Godai Tomoatsu 五代友厚
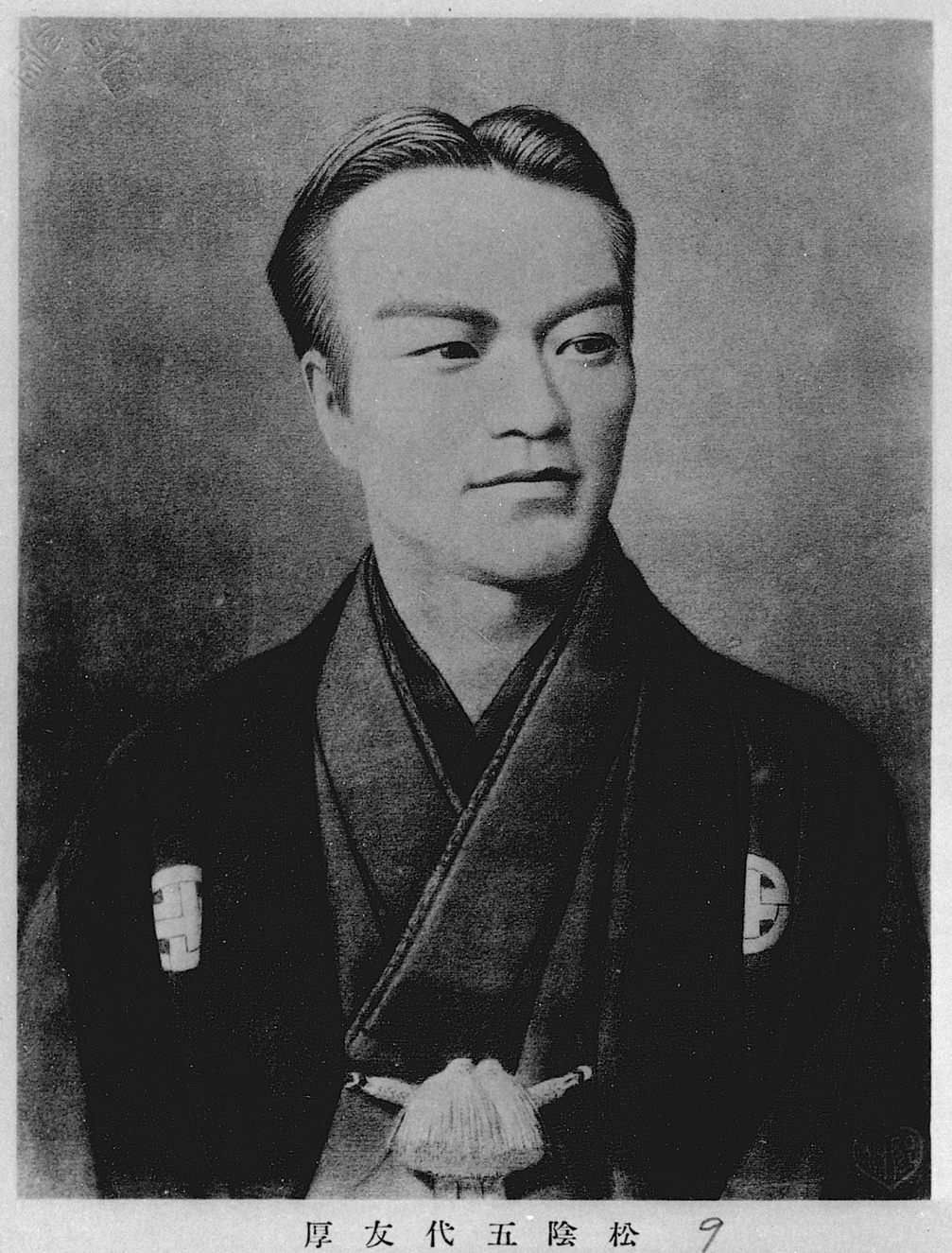
- Born: February 12, 1836; Kagoshima, Satsuma Domain, Japan
- Died: September 25, 1885 (aged 49)

Godai Tomoatsu (五代 友厚; February 12, 1836 – September 25, 1885) was one of the Satsuma students of 1865 who were smuggled out of Bakumatsu period Japan to study in Great Britain. He returned to become Japan's leading entrepreneur of the early Meiji period.

== Early life ==
Godai was born in Satsuma domain (in what is now part of Kagoshima city, Kagoshima Prefecture), and was sent by the domain to study naval science and technology at the Kaigun Denshujo in Nagasaki. At the outbreak of the Anglo-Satsuma War of 1864, he was appointed captain of the Ten’yū Maru. Along with Matsuki Koan, he was taken prisoner by the Royal Navy when his ship was captured. Released, he was forced to hide, as some in Satsuma suspected him of betraying them to England. During his hiding, he drafted a plan for a program of military expansion underpinned by open foreign trade. His plan included sending sixteen men and an interpreter to study in London. He himself was, naturally, one of 15 students to be sent to Great Britain to study at the University College, London in defiance of the Tokugawa bakufu's official national seclusion policy.

== Bakumatsu period ==
In 1865 Godai made contact with Thomas Glover who steered negotiations with the Platt textile machinery giant in Oldham, Lancashire, England. This visit led to the establishment of the Kagoshima Mill in Satsuma in 1867 - reputed to be Japan's first modern factory. Manchester engineers spent a year in Kagoshima to supervise building, factory production and the training of local workers. The Manchester Seven - as they became known had a special White Mansion constructed for their comfort and is today a museum. Godai's UK visit also included the Manchester Chamber of Commerce - reputed to have inspired the foundation of the pioneering Osaka Chamber and Industry.

Godai later returned to Europe to negotiate with the Comte des Cantons Charles Montblanc (1832–1893) to establish a joint venture commercial enterprise for the development of Satsuma's natural resources in exchange for European weapons and manufactured goods. This French–Satsuma trading company attracted French investment into the Satsuma domain to establish a steamship shipyard and textile (silk) spinning factories and to send promising students from Satsuma overseas. Its existence also allowed Satsuma to participate as if it were an independent country in the Paris Exhibition of 1867, much to the consternation of the Tokugawa-government representatives. At the same time, Godai used his contacts to purchase the latest warships to equip the Satsuma in preparation with the growing conflict to overthrow the Tokugawa regime.

== Meiji statesman ==
After the Meiji Restoration, Godai became a San'yo (junior councilor), and used his foreign experience to defuse a number of incidents created against foreigners by xenophobic ex-samurai. He resigned from government service in 1869, and turned his full attention to business. Basing himself in Osaka, he created several major joint stock companies involved in international trade, commerce and shipping, which he operated simultaneously. Godai went on to found the Osaka Chamber of Commerce and the Osaka Stock Exchange.

He also participated in the Osaka Conference of 1875, which attempted to hold together the fragile coalition of feudal domains which dominated the early Meiji government.

Godai was later implicated in the Hokkaido Colonization Office Scandal of 1881, which brought down the administration of Prime Minister Kuroda Kiyotaka.

== Commemoration ==
A biographical drama film titled Godai - The Wunderkind by Japanese film director Mitsutoshi Tanaka was released in 2020, starring Haruma Miura as Godai.

== Bibliography ==
- Broad, Geoffrey. "Japan and the North West of England" Greater Manchester Centre for Japanese Studies, 1997, ISBN 1-900748-00-2
- Cobbing, Andrew (1998). The Japanese Discovery of Victorian Britain. London: RoutledgeCurzon. ISBN 1-873410-81-6.
- Cobbing, Andrew (2000). The Satsuma Students in Britain: Japan's Early Search for the essence of the West. Richmond: Routledge. ISBN 1-873410-97-2.
- Sagers, John. Origins of Japanese Wealth and Power Reconciling Confucianism and Capitalism, 1830-1885. Macmillan, New York 1995. ISBN 1-4039-7111-0
