= Fumi Nikaido =

Japanese actress and model (born 1994)

Fumi Nikaidō
- 二階堂 ふみ
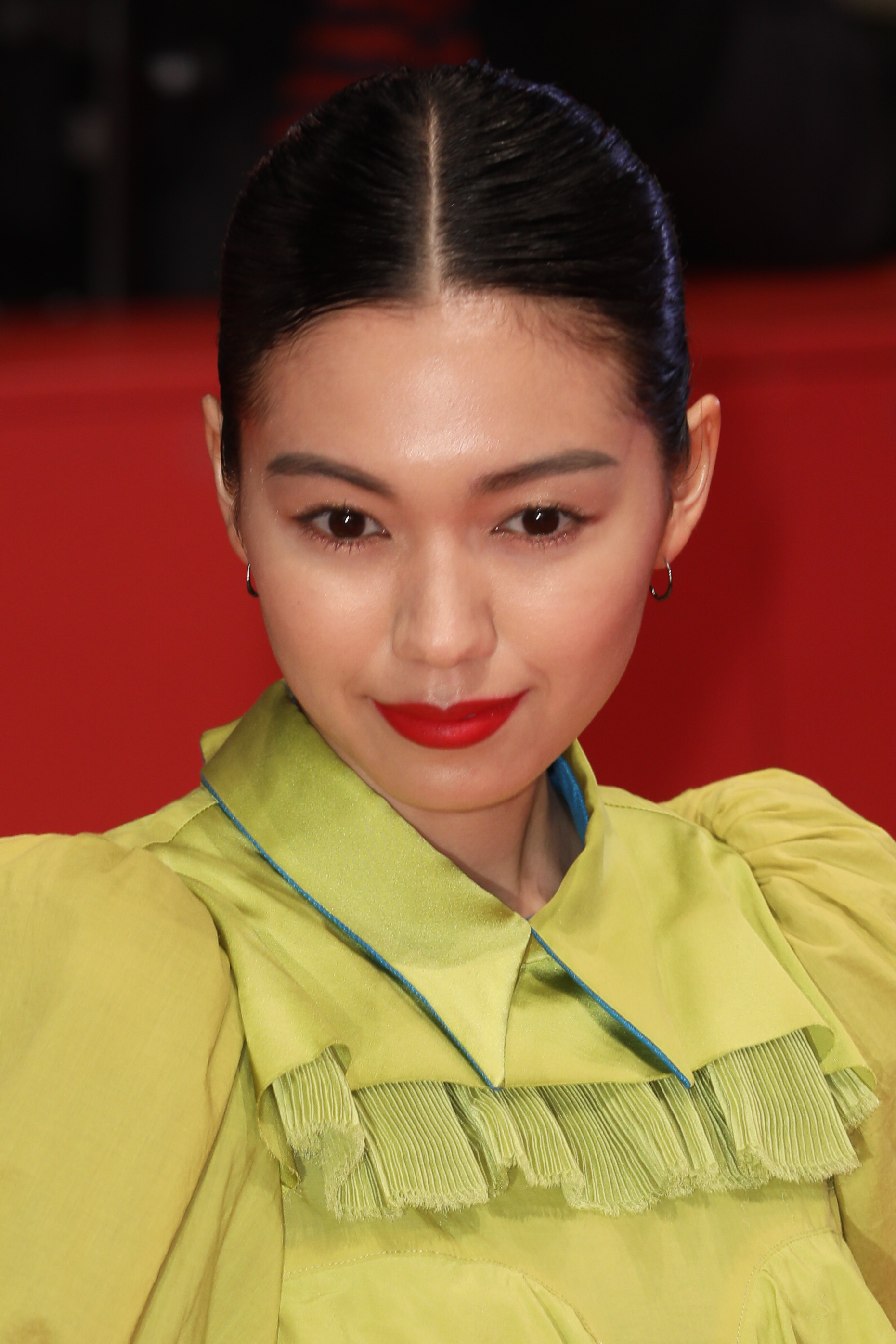
- Nikaidō at the 2018 68th Berlin International Film Festival
- Born: 21 September 1994 (age 32); Naha, Okinawa, Japan
- Occupation: Actress
- Years active: 2009–present
- Agent: Sony Music Artists
- Spouse: Kazunori Kaneko (m. 2025)

Fumi Nikaidō (二階堂 ふみ, Nikaidō Fumi; born 21 September 1994) is a Japanese actress.

== Career ==
Nikaidō starred in Koji Yakusho's film Toad's Oil. She and Shota Sometani received the Marcello Mastroianni Award for Best Young Actor and Actress Award for their work in Shion Sono's Himizu at the 68th Venice International Film Festival in 2011. In 2014, she was introduced in Variety as an "Int'l Star You Should Know" and New York Asian Film Festival named her as an "International Rising Star".

== Personal life ==
Nikaidō was born in Naha, Okinawa. In August 2025, she announced her marriage to comedian Kazunori Kaneko, who is ten years her senior.

=== Philanthropy ===
In 2015, after getting a pet ferret, she became interested in animal welfare and environmental protection. In 2018, she became a pescatarian. In 2023, she contributed to sustainable fashion by launching a coat made from kapok (a plant-based material), which uses no animal-derived materials.

== Filmography ==
=== Film ===
Year	Title	Role	Notes	Ref.
2009	Toad's Oil	Hikari		
2011	Himizu	Keiko Chazawa	Lead role	
2013	Why Don't You Play in Hell?	Michico		
2014	Au Revoir L'Ete	Sakuko	Lead role	
2014	My Man	Hana Kusarino	Lead role	
2014	The World of Kanako	Nami Endo		
2015	This Nation's Sky	Satoko	Lead role	
2016	Kako: My Sullen Past	Kako	Lead role	
2016	Someone	Rika		
2016	Wolf Girl and Black Prince	Erika Shinohara	Lead role	
2016	Scoop!	Nobi Namekawa		
2018	Inuyashiki	Shion Watanabe		
2018	River's Edge	Haruna Wakakusa	Lead role	
2019	No Longer Human	Tomie Yamazaki		
2019	Little Miss Period	Tomie Yamazaki	Lead role	
2019	Fly Me to the Saitama	Momomi Dan'noura	Lead role	
2020	Tezuka's Barbara	Barbara	Lead role	
2020	Threads: Our Tapestry of Love	Toshiko Yamada		
2022	What to Do with the Dead Kaiju?	Sayoko		
2023	Fly Me to the Saitama: From Biwa Lake with Love	Momomi Dan'noura	Lead role	
2023	The Moon	Yōko		
2025	A Pale View of Hills	Sachiko	British-Japanese film	
2026	Children Untold	Fumiko Sone	Lead role	
2026	The Secret Battlefield	Sayuri Ujita		
2026	Vivant: The Movie	Kaoru Nogi		
TBA	Funky Forest: The Second Contact			

=== Television ===
Year	Title	Role	Notes	Ref.
2011	The Tempest	Omoedo		
2012	Future Diary	Megumi Fuwa		
2012	Taira no Kiyomori	Taira no Tokuko	Taiga drama	
2013	Woman: My Life for My Children	Shiori Uesugi		
2014	Gunshi Kanbei	Lady Chacha	Taiga drama	
2014	Henshin	Megumi Hamura		
2015	Mondai no Aru Restaurant	Yumi Nitta		
2016	Lost ID	Sanae Kuramoto		
2016	Teacher Gappa	Aiko Muramoto	Lead role; television film	
2017	Shiawase no Kioku	Fuyuka Tsushima	Television film	
2017	Sumu Sumu	Herself		
2017	Frankenstein's Love	Tsugumi Tsuguru		
2018	Segodon	Aikana	Taiga drama	
2018	In This Corner of the World	Rin Shiraki		
2019	Strawberry Night Saga	Reiko Himekawa	Lead role	
2020	Yell	Oto Sekiuchi	Asadora	
2021	Promise Cinderella	Hayame Katsuragi	Lead role	
2023–26	Vivant	Kaoru Yuzuki	2 seasons	
2024	Eye Love You	Yuri Motomiya	Lead role	
2024–present	Shōgun	Lady Ochiba	American television series; 2 seasons	
2025	Simulation: Defeat in the Summer of 1941	Sayuri Ujita	Miniseries	
2025	Pray Speak What Has Happened	Rika Koda		

=== Dubbing ===
- The Addams Family - Wednesday Addams
- The Addams Family 2 - Wednesday Addams

=== Others ===
- 71st NHK Kōhaku Uta Gassen (2020), the red team captain

== Awards and nominations ==
Year	Award	Category	Work(s)	Result	Ref.
2011	68th Venice International Film Festival	Marcello Mastroianni Award for Young Actress	Himizu	Won	
2013	36th Japan Academy Film Prize	Newcomer of the Year	Himizu, Lesson of the Evil	Won	
2013	13th New York Asian Film Festival	Rising Star Award	My Man	Won	
2014	8th Asian Film Awards	Best Supporting Actress	Why Don't You Play in Hell?	Nominated	
2014	35th Yokohama Film Festival	Best Supporting Actress	Why Don't You Play in Hell?, Mourning Recipe	Won	
2014	56th Blue Ribbon Awards	Best Supporting Actress	Why Don't You Play in Hell?, Brain Man	Won	
2015	38th Japan Academy Film Prize	Best Actress	My Man	Nominated	
2015	39th Elan d'or Awards	Newcomer of the Year	Herself	Won	
2020	62nd Blue Ribbon Awards	Best Actress	Fly Me to the Saitama	Nominated	
2020	43rd Japan Academy Film Prize	Best Actress	Fly Me to the Saitama	Nominated	
2020	43rd Japan Academy Film Prize	Best Supporting Actress	No Longer Human	Nominated	
2021	24th Nikkan Sports Drama Grand Prix	Best Supporting Actress	Yell	Won	
2023	36th Nikkan Sports Film Awards	Best Supporting Actress	The Moon	Won	
2023	48th Hochi Film Awards	Best Supporting Actress	The Moon	Won	
2024	78th Mainichi Film Awards	Best Supporting Actress	The Moon	Nominated	
2024	66th Blue Ribbon Awards	Best Supporting Actress	The Moon	Nominated	
2024	97th Kinema Junpo Awards	Best Supporting Actress	The Moon	Won	
2025	38th Nikkan Sports Film Awards	Best Supporting Actress	A Pale View of Hills	Nominated	
2026	80th Mainichi Film Awards	Best Supporting Performance	A Pale View of Hills	Nominated	
2026	39th Nikkan Sports Film Awards	Best Supporting Actress	Children Untold and The Secret Battlefield	Pending	
