= Twisted Justice =

- Poster
- Japanese: 日本で一番悪い奴ら
- Directed by: Kazuya Shiraishi
- Screenplay by: Junya Ikegami
- Story by: Yoshiaki Inaba
- Produced by: Seiichi Tanaka; Shinichi Takahashi
- Starring: Gō Ayano; Young Dais; Yukio Ueno; Haruna Yabuki; Kumi Takiuchi; Pierre Taki; Nakamura Shidō II
- Cinematography: Takahiro Imai
- Edited by: Hitomi Kato
- Music by: Goro Yasukawa
- Distributed by: Toei; Nikkatsu
- Release date: June 25, 2016 (Japan)
- Running time: 135 minutes
- Country: Japan
- Language: Japanese
- Box office: US$3 million

Twisted Justice (Japanese: 日本で一番悪い奴ら, Hepburn: Nihon de Ichiban Warui Yatsura) is a 2016 Japanese crime comedy-drama film directed by Kazuya Shiraishi and written by Junya Ikegami. It was released in Japan by Toei and Nikkatsu on June 25, 2016.

== Cast ==
- Gō Ayano as Yoichi Moroboshi
- Young Dais
- Yukio Ueno
- Haruna Yabuki
- Kumi Takiuchi
- Ryuzō Tanaka
- Minosuke
- Tomoya Nakamura
- Katsuya
- Ayumu Saitō
- Munetaka Aoki as Kuribayashi
- Takayuki Kinoshita
- Takuma Otoo as Kuniyoshi
- Pierre Taki as Murai
- Nakamura Shidō II as Kuroiwa

== Reception ==
On its opening weekend at the Japanese box office, the film was eight-placed in both admissions, with 51,950, and in gross, with US$701,406. On its second weekend it remained in eighth place in admissions and also in gross with US$493,179. On its third weekend, it dropped to ninth place by admissions and to tenth place by gross, with US$329,629. As of July 10, 2016, the film had grossed US$$2.98 million in Japan.

James Hadfield of The Japan Times gave the film two and a half stars out of five, saying the film "is a shade off" and that "the director has attempted to fashion a blackly comic caper from a story that would probably have benefitted from a grittier approach."
