= Pierre Taki =

Japanese musician and actor (born 1967)

- ピエール瀧
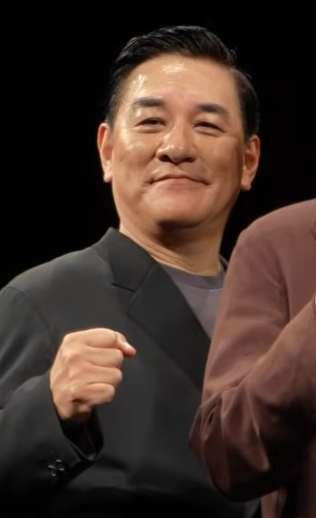
- Taki at the premiere of Tokyo Burst: Crime City in 2026
- Born: Masanori Taki; April 8, 1967 (age 59); Aoi-ku, Shizuoka, Shizuoka
- Occupations: Musician; actor
- Years active: 1986–present
- Musical career
- Genre: Synth-pop
- Label: Ki/oon
- Member of: Denki Groove

Masanori Taki (瀧 正則, Taki Masanori; born April 8, 1967), better known by his stage name Pierre Taki (ピエール瀧, Piēru Taki), is a Japanese musician and actor. He is the front man for synthpop group Denki Groove, which consists of himself and Takkyu Ishino. As of 2001 he was involved in an exhibit called Prince Tongha with Hideyuki Tanaka in New York City. He also frequently appears as an actor in film and on television.

== Filmography ==
=== Films ===
- Red Shadow (2001)
- 1980 (2003)
- Survive Style 5+ (2004)
- Linda Linda Linda (2005)
- Lorelei: The Witch of the Pacific Ocean (2005)
- Sway (2006)
- Rainbow Song (2006)
- Ten Nights of Dreams (2007)
- 10 Promises to My Dog (2008)
- One Million Yen Girl (2008)
- School Days with a Pig (2008)
- Rakugo Story (2010)
- The Floating Castle (2012)
- The Devil's Path (2013), Sudō
- Like Father, Like Son (2013)
- Parasyte: Part 1 (2014)
- Attack on Titan (2015)
- Twisted Justice (2016)
- Shin Godzilla (2016)
- Rage (2016)
- Fueled: The Man They Called Pirate (2016), Fujimoto
- Outrage Coda (2017), Hanada
- The Blood of Wolves (2018), Ginji
- Sunny/32 (2018)
- A Gambler's Odyssey 2020 (2019)
- Miyamoto (2019)
- Samurai Shifters (2019)
- Romance Doll (2020), Kaoru Kubota
- Zokki (2021)
- September 1923 (2023), Shinjirō Sunada
- Horizon (2024)
- Bullet Train Explosion (2025)
- Hero's Island (2025), Kishaba
- A Light in the Harbor (2025), Yuto Otsuka
- New Group (2026), the principal
- Tokyo Burst: Crime City (2026)

=== Television ===
- Amachan (2013)
- Gunshi Kanbei (2014), Hachisuka Koroku
- Daddy Sister (2016), Sōkichi Morita
- Rikuoh (2017), Kenji Obara
- The Naked Director (2019), Wada
- Idaten (2019), Shinsaku Kurosaka
- Sanctuary (2023), Enshō-oyakata
- House of Ninjas (2024), Zensuke Omi
- Tokyo Swindlers (2024)
- Human Vapor (2026), Mamoru Sakamoto

=== Animation ===
- Hakaba Kitarō (2008), Trump Omoi (eps. 4–5)
- Super Crooks (2021), Gladiator
- The Last Blossom (2025), Housenka

=== Video games ===
Year	Title	Role	Notes	Console	Source
2005	WTF: Work Time Fun	N/A	Game director	PlayStation Portable	
2006	Siren 2	Takeaki Misawa		PlayStation 2	
2008	The Last Guy	N/A	Game director	PlayStation 3	
2018	Judgment	Kyohei Hamura	Later patched out and replaced	PlayStation 4	
2019	Kingdom Hearts III	Olaf	Later patched out and replaced	PlayStation 4, Xbox One	

=== Dubbing ===
Title	Role	Voice dub for	Notes	Source
Frozen	Olaf	Josh Gad		
Kubo and the Two Strings	Beetle/Hanzo	Matthew McConaughey		

== Legal issues ==
In March 2019, Taki was arrested on suspicion of cocaine use and his latest video game, Judgment, was withdrawn from sale by the publisher, Sega. His appearance has been removed in the Western release. He was later released on bail on April 4, 2019. After he admitted to using cocaine, the Tokyo District court sentenced him to eighteen months in prison, suspended for three years.

His voice acting roles were also replaced such as Olaf from Frozen. Home video releases of Frozen were removed in Japan.

Since then, Shunsuke Takeuchi became the new Japanese dub voice of Olaf.
