= Tokyo Swindlers =

2024 Japanese television series

- Promotional release poster

Japanese name
- Kanji: 地面師たち
Transcriptions
- Revised Hepburn: Jimenshitachi
- Genre: Crime drama; Thriller
- Based on: Tokyo Swindlers by Ko Shinjo
- Written by: Hitoshi One; Ko Shinjo
- Directed by: Hitoshi One
- Starring: Go Ayano; Etsushi Toyokawa
- Theme music composer: Takkyu Ishino
- Country of origin: Japan
- Original language: Japanese
- No. of seasons: 1
- No. of episodes: 7

Production
- Producers: Yoshida Kenichi; Miyake Harue
- Production locations: Tokyo, Japan
- Cinematography: Ato Shoichi; Morishita Shigeki
- Running time: 38-67 minutes
- Production companies: Nikkatsu Corporation; Booster Project

Original release
- Network: Netflix
- Release: July 25, 2024 – present

Tokyo Swindlers (Japanese: 地面師たち, Hepburn: Jimenshitachi) is a Japanese television series directed and written by Hitoshi One. Produced by Nikkatsu Corporation and Booster Project for Netflix, and stars Go Ayano and Etsushi Toyokawa. The series premiered worldwide on July 25, 2024.

== Cast ==
- Go Ayano as Takumi Tsujimoto
- Etsushi Toyokawa as Harrison Yamanaka
- Kazuki Kitamura as Takeshita
- Eiko Koike as Reiko
- Pierre Taki as Goto
- Shota Sometani as Nagai
- Izumi Matsuoka as Natsumi Kawai
- Kaito Yoshimura as Kaede
- Anthony as Orochi
- Satoru Matsuo as Sunaga
- Taro Suruga as Maki
- Makita Sports as Hayashi
- Elaiza Ikeda as Detective Kuramochi
- Lily Franky as Detective Tatsu
- Koji Yamamoto as Takashi Aoyagi

== Production ==
In February 2024, The series was announced on Netflix. It is based on Ko Shinjo's 2019 novel Tokyo Swindlers. The filming of the series concluded in 2023.

In November 2026, Netflix announced that the series had been renewed for a second season, due to premiere in 2027.

== Reception ==
James Hadfield writing for The Japan Times rated the series 3 stars (out of 5). Daniel Hart of Ready Steady Cut assigns the series 3.5 stars. Jenny Nixon of Common Sense Media gave the series a four out of five stars. Jan Lee of The Straits Times gave the series a rating of 4/5 stars.

On the review aggregator website Rotten Tomatoes, 100% of 6 critics' reviews are positive, with an average rating of 7.3/10. Joel Keller of Decider and Graeme Blundell of The Australian reviewed the series.
