= Ask This of Rikyu =

- Poster
- Directed by: Mitsutoshi Tanaka
- Screenplay by: Eriko Komatsu
- Based on: Rikyu ni tazuneyo by Kenichi Yamamoto
- Starring: Ichikawa Ebizō XI; Miki Nakatani; Ichikawa Danjūrō XII; Yūsuke Iseya
- Cinematography: Takeshi Hamada
- Edited by: Kazunobu Fujita
- Music by: Taro Iwashiro
- Distributed by: Toei
- Release date: 7 December 2013 (Japan)
- Running time: 123 minutes
- Country: Japan
- Language: Japanese
- Box office: ¥664 billion (US$6.36 million)

Ask This of Rikyu (Japanese: 利休にたずねよ, Hepburn: Rikyū ni tazuneyo) is a 2013 Japanese biographical film directed by Mitsutoshi Tanaka and based on a novel by Kenichi Yamamoto. This film won the Best Artistic Contribution Award at the 37th Montréal World Film Festival, the Best Director Award at the 2014 Osaka Cinema Festival, the 30th Fumiko Yamaji Cultural Award, and the 37th Japan Academy Film Prize in nine categories, including Best Art Direction, Excellent Film and Excellent Leading Actor.

== Cast ==
- Ichikawa Danjūrō XIII as Sen no Rikyū, a legendary Japanese tea master from Sakai, Osaka.
- Miki Nakatani as Souon, Rikyū's wife
- Ichikawa Danjūrō XII as Takeno Jōō, a reputed Japanese tea master, merchant and Rikyū's master. (Note: Takeno Jōō's actor, Ichikawa Danjūrō XII is the late real-life father of Rikyū's actor, Ichikawa Ebizō XI, who is currently known as Ichikawa Danjūrō XIII.)
- Yūsuke Iseya as Oda Nobunaga, a legendary Japanese daimyō, Rikyū's first employer and Japan's first "Great Unifier"
- Nao Ōmori as Toyotomi Hideyoshi, a legendary Japanese daimyō, Rikyū's second employer/close confidant-turned enemy and Japan's second "Great Unifier"
- Clara Lee as a Gyu-soo (Note: Alternatively written as Gyu-su.) (Korean: 규수), a noblewoman from Joseon (daughter of a Yangban) who was sold to Japan and falls in love with the male protagonist, Rikyu. (Note: Although in the novel it is said that she was from Goryeo, both the movie and the news sites (both from Japan and South Korea) reveal that she is actually a noblewoman from Joseon, daughter of a high-ranking aristocrat (or Yangban, the highest caste in the Joseon caste system) who was sold to Japan after a political conflict (this is especially important if we take into account that the main character of both the movie and the novel, Sen no Rikyū, was born years after the fall of Goryeo).)

== Reception ==
The film earned ¥664 billion (US$6.36 million) in the month after being released. The film made its Los Angeles premiere at LA Eigafest 2014.
