= Lily Franky =

Japanese illustrator, writer and actor (born 1963)

- Franky at the Toronto International Film Festival in 2026
- Born: Masaya Nakagawa; 4 November 1963 (age 63); Fukuoka, Japan
- Other name: Elvis Woodstock
- Occupations: Actor, writer, illustrator, designer, musician, lyricist, photographer, essayist
- Years active: 1980s–present

Masaya Nakagawa (中川 雅也, Nakagawa Masaya; born November 4, 1963), known professionally as Lily Franky (リリー・フランキー, Rirī Furankī), is a Japanese illustrator, writer, and actor. He has appeared in more than 40 films since 2001.

== Career ==
In 2016, Franky received the Cut Above Award for Outstanding Performance in Film at Japan Cuts: Festival of New Japanese Film in New York.

== Filmography ==
=== Television ===
| Year | Title | Role | Notes | Ref. |
|---|---|---|---|---|
| 1995–96 | Shitamachi Ninjō Gekijō | | | |
| 2010 | Code Blue | | Season 2 | |
| 2010 | Ryomaden: The Legend | Kawada Shōryō | Taiga drama | |
| 2016 | Crow's Blood | Undertaker | Cameo | |
| 2017 | Million Yen Women | Tatsuyuki | | |
| 2017 | Silver and Gold | Ginji Hirai | | |
| 2017 | Hello, Detective Hedgehog | Minami | | |
| 2019 | Idaten | Taketora Ogata | Taiga drama | |
| 2019 | Natsuzora: Natsu's Sky | Kazusada Mogi | Asadora | |
| 2019 | Two Homelands | Kōki Hirota | Television film | |
| 2019 | The Naked Director | Takei | | |
| 2019 | Terrace House: Tokyo 2019–2020 | Himself | Cameo | |
| 2020 | A Day-Off of Kasumi Arimura | Himura | Episode 3 | |
| 2022 | He's Expecting | Eiichi Hiyama | | |
| 2023 | What Will You Do, Ieyasu? | Hisamatsu Toshikatsu | Taiga drama | |
| 2023 | The Makanai: Cooking for the Maiko House | Ren | | |
| 2024 | Tokyo Swindlers | Tatsu | | |
| 2024 | What Comes After Love | Takuto Aoki | Episode 2, 3 | |
| 2024–25 | Omusubi | Narrator | Asadora | |
| 2025 | Who Saw The Peacock Dance in the Jungle? | Haruo Yamashita | | |
| 2026 | Until the T-shirt Dries | Koji Miyauchi | | |

=== Film ===
| Year | Title | Role | Notes | Ref. |
|---|---|---|---|---|
| 2001 | Blind Beast vs Killer Dwarf | | | |
| 2008 | All Around Us | Kanao Satō | | |
| 2011 | We Can't Change the World. But, We Wanna Build a School in Cambodia. | The bar master | | |
| 2013 | Like Father, Like Son | Yūdai Saiki | | |
| 2013 | The Devil's Path | Sensei | | |
| 2013 | Yellow Elephant | | | |
| 2014 | As the Gods Will | Homeless man/God | | |
| 2015 | Our Little Sister | Sen-ichi Fukuda | | |
| 2015 | Yakuza Apocalypse | Genyō Kamiura | | |
| 2015 | The Boy and the Beast | Hyakushūbō (voice) | | |
| 2015 | Three Stories of Love | | | |
| 2015 | Fires on the Plain | | | |
| 2015 | Bakuman | Sasaki | | |
| 2016 | After the Storm | Yamabe | | |
| 2016 | Scoop! | Charagen | | |
| 2016 | The Shell Collector | | Lead role | |
| 2016 | The Top Secret: Murder in Mind | | | |
| 2016 | Blank13 | Kōji's father | | |
| 2016 | While the Women Are Sleeping | Iizuka | | |
| 2016 | A Double Life | Professor Shinohara | | |
| 2016 | Satoshi: A Move for Tomorrow | Nobuo Mori | | |
| 2016 | My Dad and Mr. Ito | Mr. Ito | | |
| 2017 | Tornado Girl | | | |
| 2017 | A Beautiful Star | Jūichirō Ōsugi | Lead role | |
| 2017 | Perfect Revolution | Kuma | Lead role | |
| 2017 | The Last Shot in the Bar | | | |
| 2018 | Miko Girl | | | |
| 2018 | Sunny | Oda | | |
| 2018 | Laplace's Witch | Zentarō Uhara | | |
| 2018 | Shoplifters | Osamu Shibata | Lead role | |
| 2018 | The Gun | | | |
| 2019 | Sea of Revival | Onodera | | |
| 2020 | Town Without Sea | | | |
| 2020 | Ainu Mosir | Okada | | |
| 2020 | Not Quite Dead Yet | Hino | | |
| 2021 | Kiba: The Fangs of Fiction | | | |
| 2021 | It's a Flickering Life | | | |
| 2021 | Every Trick in the Book | Maeda | | |
| 2021 | When the Curry Is Ready | Ken'ichi | | |
| 2022 | Cottontail | Kenzaburō | British-Japanese film | |
| 2022 | Prior Convictions | Fumio Tōyama | | |
| 2022 | The Last 10 Years | Kajiwara | | |
| 2022 | A Mother's Touch | | | |
| 2023 | Bad City | Wataru Gojō | | |
| 2023 | Call Me Chihiro | Utsumi | | |
| 2023 | Undercurrent | Michio Yamasaki | | |
| 2023 | Analog | Tamiya | | |
| 2023 | Wheels and Axle | | | |
| 2024 | The Parades | Michael | | |
| 2024 | Harbin | Itō Hirobumi | South Korean film | |
| 2025 | 1st Kiss | Ichiro Tenma | | |
| 2025 | Renoir | Keiji | | |
| 2026 | Fujiko | Sasaki | | |
| 2026 | Mr. Nelson, Did You Kill People? | Kuroi | | |
| 2026 | Diary of a Mad Old Man | Utsugi | Lead role; American film | |
| 2027 | Diamonds in the Sand | Yoji | Lead role | |

=== Japanese dubbing ===
| Year | Title | Role | Notes | Ref. |
|---|---|---|---|---|
| 2016 | Song of the Sea | Conor / Mac Lir | | |
| 2018 | My Life as a Courgette | Raymond | | |
| 2022 | The Bears' Famous Invasion of Sicily | Old Bear | | |

== Awards and nominations ==
| Year | Award | Category | Work(s) | Result | Ref. |
|---|---|---|---|---|---|
| 2009 | 51st Blue Ribbon Awards | Best Newcomer | All Around Us | Won | |
| 2009 | 18th Japanese Movie Critics Awards | Best Newcomer | All Around Us | Won | |
| 2013 | 26th Nikkan Sports Film Award | Best Supporting Actor | The Devil's Path and Like Father, Like Son | Won | |
| 2014 | 87th Kinema Junpo Awards | Best Supporting Actor | The Devil's Path and Like Father, Like Son | Won | |
| 2014 | 35th Yokohama Film Festival | Best Supporting Actor | The Devil's Path and Like Father, Like Son | Won | |
| 2014 | 23rd Japanese Movie Critics Awards | Best Supporting Actor | The Devil's Path and Like Father, Like Son | Won | |
| 2014 | 37th Japan Academy Film Prize | Best Supporting Actor | Like Father, Like Son | Won | |
| 2014 | 37th Japan Academy Film Prize | Best Supporting Actor | The Devil's Path | Nominated | |
| 2016 | 41st Hochi Film Award | Best Supporting Actor | After the Storm, Scoop! and Satoshi: A Move for Tomorrow | Nominated | |
| 2016 | 29th Nikkan Sports Film Award | Best Supporting Actor | After the Storm and Scoop! | Nominated | |
| 2017 | 59th Blue Ribbon Awards | Best Supporting Actor | Satoshi: A Move for Tomorrow and Scoop! | Won | |
| 2017 | 40th Japan Academy Film Prize | Best Supporting Actor | Scoop! | Nominated | |
| 2019 | 73rd Mainichi Film Awards | Best Actor | Shoplifters | Nominated | |
| 2019 | 61st Blue Ribbon Awards | Best Actor | Shoplifters | Nominated | |
| 2019 | 28th Tokyo Sports Film Award | Best Actor | Shoplifters | Won | |
| 2019 | 42nd Japan Academy Film Prize | Best Actor | Shoplifters | Nominated | |
