= The Devil's Path =

- The Original Japanese Poster.
- Directed by: Kazuya Shiraishi
- Written by: Izumi Takahashi; Kazuya Shiraishi
- Produced by: Yoshinori Chiba
- Starring: Takayuki Yamada; Lily Franky; Pierre Taki
- Cinematography: Takahiro Imai
- Edited by: Hitomi Kato
- Music by: Goro Yasukawa
- Distributed by: Nikkatsu
- Release dates: August 23, 2013 (The World Film Festival); September 21, 2013 (Japan)
- Running time: 128 minutes
- Country: Japan
- Language: Japanese

The Devil's Path (Japanese: 凶悪, Hepburn: Kyōaku) is a 2013 Japanese crime drama film directed by Kazuya Shiraishi, starring Takayuki Yamada, Lily Franky, and Pierre Taki.

The film was inspired by serial murder case which involved the Ryoji Goto and Shizuo Mikami.

== Cast ==
- Takayuki Yamada as Shuichi Fujii
- Lily Franky as Takao Kimura
- Pierre Taki as Junji Sudo
- Chizuru Ikewaki as Yoko Fujii
- Kazuko Shirakawa as Yurie Ushiba
- Katsuya Kobayashi as Kuniyuki Igarashi
- Ryotaro Yonemura as Kenichi Sasaki
- Izumi Matsuoka as Shizue Tono
- Yu Saito as Yoshimasa Hino
- Jitsuko Yoshimura as Kazuko Fujii
- Boo Jiji as Satoru Ushiba
- Nozomi Muraoka as Rie Shibakawa

== Reception ==
Film Business Asia's Derek Elley gave the film a rating of 7 out of 10. Kwenton Bellette of Twitch Film criticized the film.

The film has been nominated for several awards at the 37th Japan Academy Prize, including for Picture of the Year.
