= Blindly in Love =

Japanese comedy drama film

- Film poster
- 箱入り息子の恋
- Directed by: Masahide Ichii
- Screenplay by: Masahide Ichii; Takahiro Tamura
- Story by: Max Mannix
- Produced by: Yumiko Takebe; Chikako Nakabayashi; Jason Gray; Ken Isaacs
- Starring: Gen Hoshino; Kaho; Sei Hiraizumi; Ryoko Moriyama; Ren Osugi
- Cinematography: Daisuke Soma
- Edited by: Chieko Suzaki
- Music by: Ren Takada
- Production company: Kino Films
- Release dates: 28 April 2013 (Jeonju International Film Festival); 8 June 2013 (Japan)
- Running time: 117 minutes
- Country: Japan
- Language: Japanese

Blindly in Love (Japanese: 箱入り息子の恋, Hepburn: Hakoiri Musuko no Koi) is a 2013 Japanese comedy drama film, directed by Masahide Ichii. The film was released on 8 June 2013, in Japan.

== Plot ==
35-year-old Kentaro (Gen Hoshino) is a social misfit, living a socially isolated existence with his parents, and his pet frog. He has never dated a girl, and his parents are desperate for him to live his life and meet someone. He holds a modest job in city hall, but doesn't socialise with his workmates. In addition, Kentaro doesn't have any friends, and is generally socially inept and inexperienced at life He hasn't had a promotion in 13 years, and barely talks to people at work. His parents go to a parental matchmaking event, hoping to find a woman to introduce to their son, however only one other group of parents speak to them, Akita Imai (Ren Osugi) and his wife (Hitomi Kuroki). They exchange profiles of their children, and the show a photo of their daughter Imai, who is clearly beautiful. Kentaro's parents are impressed by the photo, however, when Akita reads Kentaro's profile he is unimpressed. The only photo they have of Kentaro is blurry. They leave Kentaro's parents there, rejecting him.

After the failed meeting, Imai's mother and Imai are out shopping, when it starts to rain. It is revealed that Imai is in fact, blind. She leaves her daughter momentarily to get the car, and coincidentally, Kentaro sees her. He offers his umbrella to her, not realising she is blind. When they get home Imai looks at the umbrella and realises it is the same name as was the matchmaking man they rejected for their daughter.

Without telling her husband, she arranges to meet. Imai's mother sees the fact that he doesn't socialise with the workmates and spend a lot of time at work as a good thing, as her successful president husband spends too much time at work and neglects family life.

All four parents and the two children meet at a restaurant. Here it is revealed to Kentaro and his parents than Imai is blind, which they had not known. However, Akita is rude to Kentaro about how unsuccessful he is, and both Kentaro's parents get up to leave in disgust and the treatment of him. Kentaro stays silent, and finally speaks up, only to asks Imai what she wants, and it becomes evident no one has asked her about her own thoughts. Imai is interested in him, but Akita blocks any connection between the two.

Ignoring her husband, Imai's mother sets them up on a date, and they start a relationship. Kentaro starts to show Imai a few places around town, and gets her a bit more confident in her surroundings, and they start to like each other. However, after 2 months Akita accidentally discovers the relationship, which Imai's mother has kept secret. He turns up and starts fighting with Kentaro, in the meantime, Imai has wondered on to the road and is just about to be hit by a car. Kentaro saves her, but he is hit by the car himself.

Kentaro ends up in hospital, and the relationship is over. He continues his life, and one day sees her walking down the street. He follows her into the same restaurant he introduced her to, and realises he still has feelings for her, however misses out on the chance to speak to her. Finally he reveals he loves her, and runs to her house. He climbs up on her verandah, sneaks into her house, and they have sex. However, Imai's parents hear the noise, and burst in to the room, where Akita attacks a naked Kentaro. While they are fighting, Kentaro is pushed off the verandah, and ends up in hospital again.

Once again, Kentaro is in hospital, and he sends love letters to Imai, and they appear to be in love once more.

== Cast ==
- Gen Hoshino as Kentaro Amanoshizuka
- Kaho as Naoko Imai
- Sei Hiraizumi as Toshi Amanoshizuka
- Ryoko Moriyama as Kentaro's mom
- Ren Osugi as Akita Imai
- Hitomi Kuroki as Naoko's mom
- Honoka Ishibashi as Kentaro's co-worker

== Production ==
The film premiered on 28 April 2013, at the Jeonju International Film Festival, and was produced by Kino Films.

== Awards ==
- 2013 (14th) Jeonju International Film Festival - April 25-May 3, 2013 - Cinema Palace *World Premiere
- 2013 (37th) Montreal World Film Festival - August 22-September 2, 2013 - Focus on World Cinema
- 2014 (27th) Tokyo International Film Festival - October 23–31, 2014 - Special Program
- 2015 (15th) Nippon Connection - June 2–7, 2015 - Nippon Cinema *German Premiere
