= Kazuya Shiraishi =

Japanese filmmaker (born 1974)

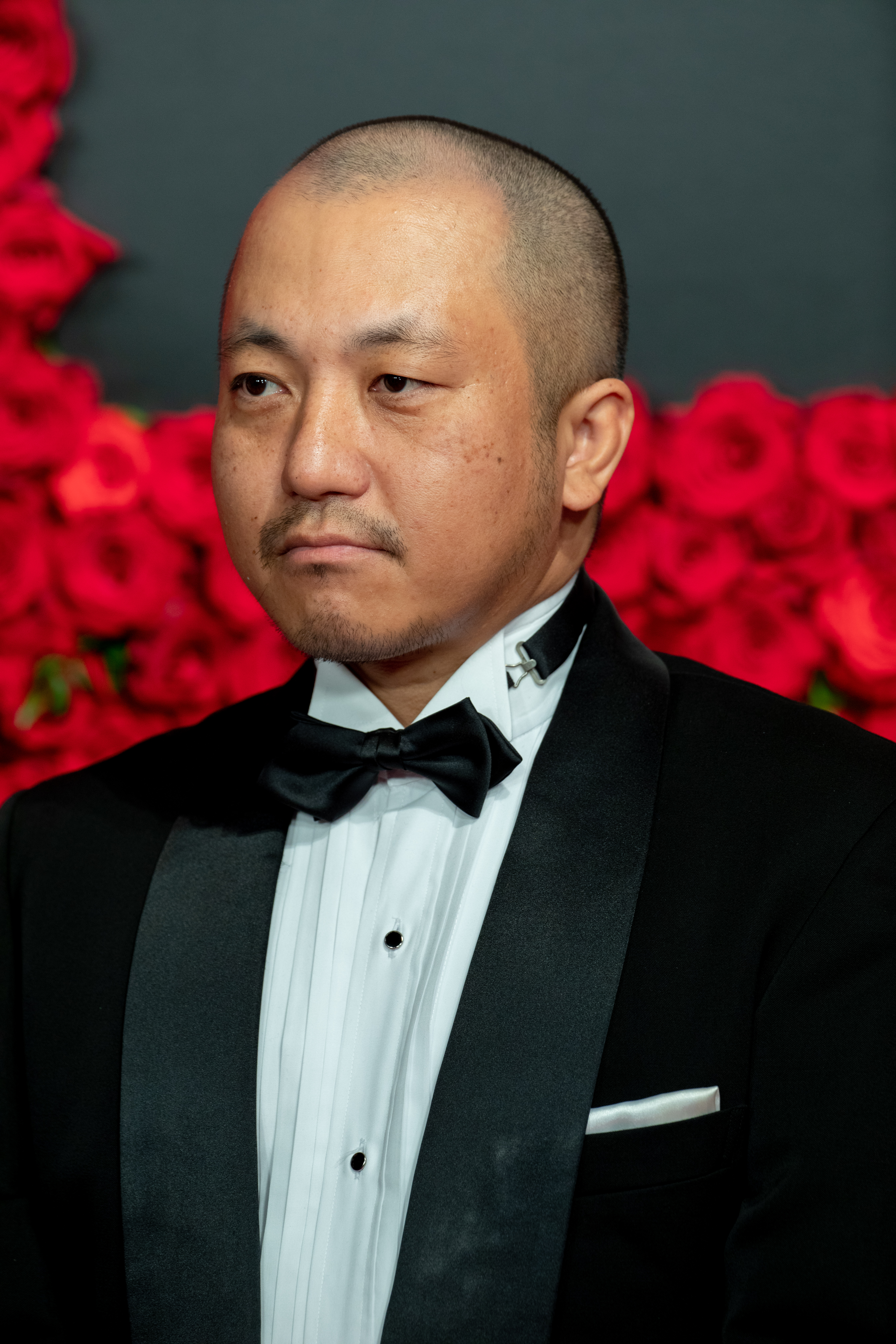
- Shiraishi at the 31st Tokyo International Film Festival in 2018
- Born: December 17, 1974 (age 51); Asahikawa, Japan
- Occupations: Film director, television director
- Years active: 2009–present

Kazuya Shiraishi (白石 和彌, Shiraishi Kazuya; born December 17, 1974 in Asahikawa, Hokkaido) is a Japanese filmmaker.

== Works ==
=== Film ===
Year	Title	Director	Writer	Notes	Ref.
2010	Lost Paradise in Tokyo	Yes	Yes		
2013	The Devil's Path	Yes	Yes		
2016	Twisted Justice	Yes			
2016	Dawn of the Felines	Yes	Yes		
2017	Birds Without Names	Yes			
2018	Sunny/32	Yes			
2018	The Blood of Wolves	Yes			
2018	Dare to Stop Us	Yes			
2019	Sea of Revival	Yes			
2019	A Gambler's Odyssey 2020	Yes	Yes		
2019	One Night	Yes			
2021	Last of the Wolves	Yes			
2022	Shin Ultraman			Cameo appearance	
2022	Lesson in Murder	Yes			
2024	Bushido	Yes			
2024	11 Rebels	Yes			
2026	Bye Bye Love: Detective Is in the Bar	Yes			

=== TV series ===
Year	Title	Notes	Ref.
2011	The Book of Human Insects		
2015	Spooky Romantics	Eps. 5 and 6	
2017	Hibana: Spark	Eps. 3 and 4	
2022	Kamen Rider Black Sun	Series director	
2024	The Queen of Villains	Series director	
