= Tokyo Family =

- Film poster
- Directed by: Yōji Yamada
- Screenplay by: Yōji Yamada; Emiko Hiramatsu
- Produced by: Kazutaka Akimoto; Takashi Yajima; Hiroshi Fukazawa
- Starring: Isao Hashizume; Kazuko Yoshiyuki; Masahiko Nishimura; Tomoko Nakajima; Satoshi Tsumabuki
- Cinematography: Masashi Chikamori
- Edited by: Iwao Ishii
- Music by: Joe Hisaishi
- Distributed by: Shochiku
- Release date: January 19, 2013 (Japan)
- Running time: 146 minutes
- Country: Japan
- Language: Japanese
- Box office: ¥1.56 billion (US$15.2 million)

Tokyo Family (Japanese: 東京家族, Hepburn: Tōkyō Kazoku) is a 2013 Japanese drama film directed by Yōji Yamada. It is a remake of Yasujirō Ozu's Tokyo Story (1953).

== Plot ==
Elderly couple Shukichi and Tomiko Hirayama travel from their home on Ōsakikamijima island to Tokyo to visit their adult children. They first stay with their eldest son Koichi, a doctor, and attend a family gathering. Koichi plans to take them sightseeing in Yokohama the following day, but cancels when called to a medical emergency.

The couple then stays with their daughter Shigeko, whose home doubles as a hair salon. Despite the cramped space, Shigeko's husband Kuzo welcomes Shukichi, taking him to a public bathhouse. Their younger son Shoji later shows his parents around Tokyo, though he evades questions about his future during lunch.

Shigeko arranges for her parents to stay at a luxury hotel in Yokohama using a client's connections. Finding little to occupy themselves, they return after one night instead of the planned two. When Shigeko says they cannot stay with her that evening due to a neighborhood meeting, the couple separates for the night.

Shukichi stays with his old friend Sanpei Numata. After visiting another friend's home to offer incense, Sanpei invites Shukichi drinking. Despite warnings from Koichi about his health, a frustrated Shukichi drinks heavily and becomes intoxicated, eventually staying at Shigeko's home where he vomits in her salon.

Tomiko visits Shoji's apartment and meets his fiancée, Noriko Mamiya. The two women bond warmly. The next day, the couple reunites at Koichi's home. While Shukichi nurses a hangover, Tomiko is delighted about Shoji's relationship. However, as she prepares to visit grandson Isamu's room, Tomiko collapses on the stairs.

Despite hospital treatment, Tomiko falls into a coma and dies the following morning. Shoji and Noriko accompany Shukichi and Tomiko's body back to the island for the funeral, though Noriko worries she is not accepted by the family. After the funeral, Shoji and Noriko remain to care for Shukichi. Before returning to Tokyo, Shukichi thanks Noriko for her kindness, entrusts her with Tomiko's watch as a keepsake, and asks her to take care of his son.

== Cast ==
- Isao Hashizume as Shukichi Hirayama
- Kazuko Yoshiyuki as Tomiko Hirayama
- Masahiko Nishimura as Koichi
- Tomoko Nakajima as Shigeko
- Satoshi Tsumabuki as Shoji
- Yui Natsukawa as Fumiko
- Yū Aoi as Noriko Mamiya
- Ryuichiro Shibata as Minoru
- Ayumu Maruyama as Isamu
- Narumi Kayashima as Kyoko Hattori
- Nenji Kobayashi as Sanpei Numata
- Jun Fubuki as Kayo

== Reception ==
The film grossed ¥1.56 billion (US$15.2 million) at the Japanese box office. Film Business Asia's Derek Elley gave the film a rating of 4 out of 10.
