= The Great Passage =

- Theatrical release poster

Japanese name
- Kanji: 舟を編む
Transcriptions
- Revised Hepburn: Fune o Amu
- Directed by: Yuya Ishii
- Written by: Kansaku Watanabe
- Based on: The Great Passage by Shion Miura
- Produced by: Tomoo Tsuchii; Kimitaka Goka; Fumitsugu Ikeda; Yasuyuki Iwanami
- Starring: Ryuhei Matsuda; Aoi Miyazaki; Joe Odagiri; Kaoru Kobayashi; Go Kato
- Cinematography: Junichi Fujisawa
- Edited by: Shinichi Fushima
- Music by: Takashi Watanabe
- Production companies: Filmmakers; Little More Co.
- Distributed by: Shochiku
- Release date: 13 April 2013 (Japan)
- Running time: 133 minutes
- Country: Japan
- Language: Japanese

The Great Passage (Japanese: 舟を編む, Hepburn: Fune o Amu) is a 2013 Japanese drama film directed by Yuya Ishii, starring Ryuhei Matsuda as a dictionary editor. It is based on the best-selling novel by Shion Miura. The film won several awards, including the Japan Academy Prize for Picture of the Year, and also received several nominations. It was selected as the Japanese entry for the Best Foreign Language Film at the 86th Academy Awards, but it was not nominated.

== Plot ==
Mitsuya Majime (Ryuhei Matsuda) is an unsuccessful and introverted publishing salesman. But his love of reading and dedication, as well as a post-graduate degree in linguistics, catches the eyes of Masashi Nishioka (Joe Odagiri) and Kouhei Araki (Kaoru Kobayashi), dictionary editors in his company who are seeking a replacement for Araki himself, as his wife is sick and he would like to spend more time looking after her.

With Majime on the editing team, the group plans to produce a new dictionary called "Daitokai" (The Great Passage/大渡海) which would bridge the gap between people and the sea of words and would take years to complete.

Back at his home, the Sou-Un-Sou Rooming House, Majime meets Kaguya Hayashi (Aoi Miyazaki), his landlady's granddaughter who has just returned from culinary school. He is struck by her beauty. Upon discovering this, the chief editor Matsumoto (Go Kato) asks Majime to write the definition for the word "Love".

== Cast ==
- Ryuhei Matsuda as Mitsuya Majime
- Aoi Miyazaki as Kaguya Hayashi
- Joe Odagiri as Masashi Nishioka
- Kaoru Kobayashi as Kohei Araki
- Go Kato as Tomosuke Matsumoto
- Haru Kuroki as Midori Kishibe
- Misako Watanabe as Take
- Chizuru Ikewaki as Remi Miyoshi
- Shingo Tsurumi as Murakoshi
- Hiroko Isayama as Kaoru Sasaki
- Kaoru Yachigusa as Chie Matsumoto
- Kazuki Namioka as Editor
- Kumiko Asō as Actress

== Reception ==
=== Critical response ===
The Great Passage received generally favorable reviews from critics. Yvonne Teh of South China Morning Post gave the film 4 and a half out of 5 stars. James Hadfield of Time Out Tokyo gave the film 4 out of 5 stars, saying "Yuya Ishii's tale of a dictionary maker in love is genuinely charming." Screen International's Mark Adams writes that, "The film pays affectionate – and even old-fashioned – tribute to the world of words and dictionaries, while also finding space for a tender and slow-paced romance that would be out-of-step for a contemporary story." Gary Goldstein of Los Angeles Times gave the film a favorable review, noting that "it's the power of words to enlighten and connect us that remains the constant and gives this charming film its special place on the shelf."

=== Accolades ===
Awards
Award	Date of ceremony	Category	Recipients and nominees	Result
Blue Ribbon Awards	February 11, 2014	Best Film		Nominated
Blue Ribbon Awards	February 11, 2014	Best Director	Yuya Ishii	Nominated
Blue Ribbon Awards	February 11, 2014	Best Actor	Ryuhei Matsuda	Nominated
Blue Ribbon Awards	February 11, 2014	Best Supporting Actor	Joe Odagiri	Nominated
Blue Ribbon Awards	February 11, 2014	Best Supporting Actress	Haru Kuroki	Nominated
Blue Ribbon Awards	February 11, 2014	Best New Actor	Haru Kuroki	Won
Hochi Film Award	December 18, 2013	Best Film		Won
Hochi Film Award	December 18, 2013	Best Actor	Ryuhei Matsuda	Won
Hochi Film Award	December 18, 2013	Best Supporting Actress	Chizuru Ikewaki	Won
Japan Academy Prize	March 7, 2014	Best Film		Won
Japan Academy Prize	March 7, 2014	Best Director	Yuya Ishii	Won
Japan Academy Prize	March 7, 2014	Best Screenplay	Kansaku Watanabe	Won
Japan Academy Prize	March 7, 2014	Best Actor	Ryuhei Matsuda	Won
Japan Academy Prize	March 7, 2014	Best Actress	Aoi Miyazaki	Nominated
Japan Academy Prize	March 7, 2014	Best Supporting Actor	Joe Odagiri	Nominated
Japan Academy Prize	March 7, 2014	Best Music	Takashi Watanabe	Nominated
Japan Academy Prize	March 7, 2014	Best Cinematography	Junichi Fujisawa	Nominated
Japan Academy Prize	March 7, 2014	Best Lighting	Tatsuya Osada	Nominated
Japan Academy Prize	March 7, 2014	Best Art	Mitsuo Harada	Nominated
Japan Academy Prize	March 7, 2014	Best Sound Recording	Hirokazu Katou	Won
Japan Academy Prize	March 7, 2014	Best Editing	Junichi Fushima	Won
Japan Academy Prize	March 7, 2014	Best Newcomer	Haru Kuroki	Nominated
Mainichi Film Award	January, 2014	Best Film		Won
Mainichi Film Award	January, 2014	Best Director	Yuya Ishii	Won
Mainichi Film Award	January, 2014	Best Actor	Ryuhei Matsuda	Won
Mainichi Film Award	January, 2014	Best Art Direction		Won

== See also ==
- Cinema of Japan
- List of submissions to the 86th Academy Awards for Best Foreign Language Film
- List of Japanese submissions for the Academy Award for Best Foreign Language Film
