= Why Don't You Play in Hell? =

- Directed by: Sion Sono
- Written by: Sion Sono
- Starring: Jun Kunimura; Shinichi Tsutsumi; Fumi Nikaidō; Tomochika; Hiroki Hasegawa; Gen Hoshino
- Cinematography: Hideo Yamamoto
- Edited by: Jun'ichi Itô
- Music by: Sion Sono
- Production companies: Bitters End; Gansis; King Record Co. T-Joy
- Distributed by: King Record Co. and T-Joy (Japan); Drafthouse Films (United States)
- Release date: September 2013
- Running time: 129 minutes
- Country: Japan
- Language: Japanese
- Box office: $1,200,000

Why Don't You Play in Hell? (地獄でなぜ悪い, Jigoku de naze warui; literally What's so bad about hell?) is a 2013 Japanese film directed, written and scored by Sion Sono.

The movie is an action film based on a screenplay written by Sono fifteen years earlier. North American distributor Drafthouse Films announced its acquisition before it made its world premiere at the 2013 Venice Film Festival, planning a 2014 release in theatres and VOD after its premiere at the 2013 Toronto International Film Festival. At Toronto the film won the People's Choice Award in the Midnight Madness section. It won the Audience Award at L’Étrange Festival in Paris the same year after a screening that was its French premiere. Its main theme is the song of the same name, self-produced and written by film cast member Gen Hoshino.

== Plot ==
Three teenagers who are passionate about cinema, including wannabe director Hirata, meet a young thug named Sasaki who they see as a potential Japanese Bruce Lee. They welcome Sasaki into their movie-making club, the "Fuck Bombers", mentored by an elderly projectionist who specializes in 35mm film.

In the meantime, a yakuza war rages. Boss Muto grapples with the assassins of a rival gang who invaded his home to attack his wife. To defend herself, she kills almost all of them and ends up in prison. The only survivor, Ikegami, has a brief encounter with Mitsuko, the 10-year-old daughter of Muto and child star of a toothbrush commercial. Escaping from the crime scene and covered in blood, Ikegami is filmed by the enthusiastic Fuck Bombers. Muto's yakuza clan defeats the rival group by killing their boss. Ikegami becomes the defeated clan's new boss and proposes a truce. He turns his gang headquarters into a castle inspired by samurai films, with all the criminals wearing kimonos. Meanwhile, Hirata leaves a prayer to the God of Cinema at a small shrine in the hopes that one day the Fuck Bombers will make a movie that will be remembered forever.

Ten years pass and their mission seems to have failed: the Fuck Bombers film club has not made a memorable film and the projectionist has died. Sasaki, feeling hopeless and depressed about having not made a successful movie, abandons his friends. Meanwhile, the war between Muto's yakuza and Ikegami's yakuza has continued. Mitsuko, now an actress, has run away from her current project, a film whose production impressed Muto's wife (Mitsuko's mother), who is about to be released from prison; she has always wanted her daughter to become a famous actress, while Mitsuko has been feeling that her roles have been beneath her and wants to quit the business. While being chased, Mitsuko hides in a phone booth and runs into Koji, who has been in love with her since he saw her commercial on TV as a child. Mitsuko doesn't know him, but she hires him to be her "lover" for a day to help hide her, and drags him along into her violent adventures.

Muto is informed by the director of Mitsuko's movie that they cannot wait for her any longer, and that they have hired a replacement actress. In the meantime, Muto's men capture Mitsuko and Koji. Muto, convinced that Koji is the man Mitsuko ran away from the set with, tries to kill Koji. Mitsuko convinces her father to spare Koji by telling him that Koji is a movie director and the only director who could film her properly. Muto decides to use Koji to make his own movie for his wife, starring his daughter. Muto rents his own film equipment and builds a set with his subordinates. One of them suggests that, to kill two birds with one stone, the film could be built around their inevitable confrontation with Ikegami.

Koji, feeling overwhelmed by the impossible task before him, escapes. He finds himself in front of the same shrine used by the Fuck Bombers ten years ago, where he is captured again by the yakuza. This causes him to vomit so profusely that it reveals the prayer left and signed by Hirata. Koji and Mitsuko decide to find Hirata to help Koji direct the movie. Though they give Koji and his two camera people (the other original Fuck Bombers) few details about the project, Hirata immediately agrees to direct when he learns they have money and 35mm film. Hirata rekindles his friendship with Sasaki and meets the rest of Muto's yakuza, who have now become a semi-professional movie crew. Hirata also convinces Ikegami, who is lost in an irrational love for Mitsuko, to collaborate with this cinematic operation. Ikegami, still entranced by Mitsuko and remembering when he met the Fuck Bombers 10 years ago, accepts the offer. Hirata insists, for dramatic purposes, that all men are armed only with katanas.

The fight begins, with full camera, lighting, and sound crews amid the action. Hirata treats the fight as a movie sequence, and yells "Cut!" when he wants a different angle on the action; the yakuza pause their fighting in these moments and take direction from Hirata, even while injured or dying. In the massacre, Muto is decapitated and Koji's hand is chopped off. Koji and Mitsuko confess their mutual love before a katana is lodged in his head. As revenge for the death of his boss, one of Muto's men shoots Ikegami with a gun, and the massacre gets out of control as the rival yakuza clans begin shooting each other. The steadycam and trolley operator begin shooting everyone without distinction, but they both die behind the camera. Suddenly the police arrive and kill Koji, Ikegami, Mitsuko, and then Sasaki. While the police slaughter the remaining survivors, Hirata gets up from the pile of corpses and begins to retrieve all the rolls of film from the cameras scattered around Ikegami's castle. Hysterical and covered with blood, he runs through the streets, shouting "Fuck Bombers!" and "We have the movie!" He imagines the cine-club being re-opened and the cast and crew coming back to life (though all bearing evidence of their injuries) for the premiere of the film, which is titled "Why Don't You Play in Hell?". The audience applauds wildly. Back in reality, Hirata runs through the streets shouting "Fuck Bombers" until a voice (presumably Sion Sono's) yells to cut, and some crew members can be seen emerging in the background.

== Cast ==
- Jun Kunimura as Muto
- Shinichi Tsutsumi as Ikegami
- Fumi Nikaidō as Mitsuko Muto
- Tak Sakaguchi as Sasaki
- Tomochika as Shizue
- Hiroki Hasegawa as Hirata
- Gen Hoshino as Koji

== Reception ==
At Metacritic, which assigns a normalized rating out of 100 to reviews from mainstream critics, the film has received an average score of 68, based on 11 reviews.

RogerEbert.com described the film as "a characteristically slippery mix of naive optimism, and gross-out, midnight-movie humor.'
