= Unforgiven (2013 film) =

2013 film by Lee Sang-il

- Film poster
- 許されざる者
- Directed by: Sang-il Lee
- Written by: Sang-il Lee
- Based on: Unforgiven (1992 film) by David Peoples
- Produced by: Suguru Kubota; Shinichi Takahashi
- Starring: Ken Watanabe
- Cinematography: Norimichi Kasamatsu
- Edited by: Tsuyoshi Imai
- Music by: Taro Iwashiro
- Production companies: Nikkatsu; Office Shirous; Warner Bros. Pictures
- Distributed by: Warner Bros. Pictures
- Release dates: 6 September 2013 (Venice); 13 September 2013 (Japan)
- Running time: 135 minutes
- Country: Japan
- Languages: Japanese; Ainu

Unforgiven (Japanese: 許されざる者, Hepburn: Yurusarezaru Mono) is a 2013 Japanese jidaigeki film written and directed by Sang-il Lee. It is a Japanese-language remake of Clint Eastwood's 1992 western Unforgiven, starring Ken Watanabe in the lead role, along with Kōichi Satō, Akira Emoto, Yuya Yagira, Shioli Kutsuna, and Jun Kunimura.

The plot closely follows the original 1992 film, but shifts the setting from the American Wild West to Japan's Hokkaido frontier during the early Meiji period. Jubei Kamata (Watanabe), a former samurai, is approached by an old associate to help claim the bounty on two men who have disfigured a prostitute.

The film was screened in the Special Presentation section at the 2013 Toronto International Film Festival. The film also made its US debut as the opening film for LA EigaFest 2013. It was also presented in 2014 in the Palm Springs International Film Festival (World Cinema Now category) and out of competition in the 70th Venice International Film Festival.

== Plot ==
Shortly after the start of the Meiji era, Jubei Kamata, a former samurai under the Tokugawa Shogunate who fought against the Imperial government, flees from Imperial cavalrymen on the northern Japanese island of Hokkaido. Jubei kills his pursuers and disappears but remains infamous as "Jubei the Killer".

Years later, in a frontier town, a pair of brothers, Sanosuke and Unosuke Hotta, beat and disfigure a prostitute while visiting a brothel. The town's senior lawman, an ex-samurai named Ichizo Oishi, lets the brothers go with only minor chastisement and a fine instead of dispatching them to Sapporo to face justice. The other prostitutes pool their money to put a bounty on the two brothers.

This draws in several men, including Kingo Baba, a former comrade of Jubei's. Another bounty hunter, Masaharu Kitaoji, arrives with a young writer who believes him to be an honorable warrior. Kitaoji draws the attention of Oishi, who demands he hand over his swords as they are banned in the town. Confronted by armed lawmen, Kitaoji has to accept, but is then beaten and humiliated by Oishi. The following day, Oishi sends him away, but the writer, Himeji, stays behind to write about Oishi instead when he reveals the truth about Kitaoji. Kingo tracks Jubei down to a small farm, where he lives in poverty with his two children. Kingo convinces a reluctant Jubei to help him earn the bounty so he can provide for his family. On the way, they are joined by Goro Sawada, a brash young half-Ainu hunter who claims to have killed five men already.

When the trio arrive at the town, Oishi finds and recognises Jubei at the inn. He taunts, beats, and scars Jubei, but doesn't kill him. Kingo and Goro are upstairs with the prostitutes and escape unharmed. After recuperating with the help of the prostitutes, the three men track down one of their targets and kill him in a brief shootout. Jubei delivers the killing blow after Kingo is unable to do so himself. After this, Kingo admits that he doesn't have the stomach for killing any longer, gives Jubei his old rifle, and leaves. Jubei and Goro return to the town to kill the second target. Jubei sends Goro in to kill the man while he uses an outhouse. After a scuffle in which Goro is unable to shoot the man, he instead stabs him with an Ainu knife, an experience that traumatizes him as he has never actually taken a life before.

Although Jubei and Goro escape, Oishi and his deputies find Goro's knife and are able to track down Kingo, who is killed after a night of brutal torture. Jubei learns of his friend's death when the scarred prostitute, Natsume, delivers the bounty. Sober for years, he drinks the last of Goro's liquor and returns to the town to exact revenge. Before he leaves, he orders Goro and Natsume to deliver his share of the bounty to his children and look after them.

Jubei returns to the inn, where he finds Kingo's body put on public display. Inside, he finds the lawman and his posse drinking. Jubei shoots the innkeeper dead for displaying Kingo outside, and tries to shoot Oishi as well before the gun runs out of bullets. He then draws his sword and a fight breaks out as a broken lantern starts a fire inside the inn. Despite being wounded several times, Jubei is able to kill Oishi and several of his men, and the survivors flee. He orders Himeji, who witnessed the battle, to write exactly about what he saw. However, Jubei knows that the Japanese authorities would be particularly harsh if they found out that Goro, who is half-Ainu, had been involved in the killing of two Japanese men, not to mention the women who hired them to carry out the act. He therefore demands that Himeji leave Goro and the prostitutes out of the account, ensuring that he alone will carry the blame for killing Oishi and the brothers. As Jubei walks out, he sees the prostitutes have taken down Kingo's body. He tells his old friend to wait for him in hell and rides out of town alone with the inn burning behind him.

Having returned to Jubei's farm, Natsume contemplates settling down there with Goro and helping him raise Jubei's children. She is hopeful that one day Jubei might return. He is last seen walking alone aimlessly in the snow, somewhere in Hokkaido.

== Cast ==
- Ken Watanabe as Jubei Kamata, a former samurai and impoverished farmer, known as "Jubei the Killer" for his violent past, who reluctantly comes out of retirement to collect a bounty on the Hotta brothers so he can feed his family. He is the equivalent character to William Munny from the original 1992 film.
- Kōichi Satō as Ichizo Oishi, a former samurai who now serves the Imperial government as a police commander in a rural Hokkaido town. He is cynical and ruthless, has little tolerance for those he perceives to be troublemakers, and bans the carrying of weapons in his town by anyone except him and his officers. He is the equivalent character to Sheriff “Little Bill” Daggett.
- Akira Emoto as Kingo Baba, a retired samurai who fought with Jubei and recruits him to collect the large bounty on the Hotta brothers. However, he eventually gives up on the hunt when he can't bring himself to kill one of the brothers, and is eventually arrested and tortured to death by Oishi for refusing to give up his friend. He is the equivalent character to Ned Logan.
- Yūya Yagira as Goro Sawada, a half-Ainu wanderer who joins Jubei and Kingo, claiming to be a hardened killer who has already taken five lives. This turns out to be a lie, and when Goro actually does kill one of the brothers, the experience traumatizes him and he swears never to kill again. He and Natsume are eventually left to care for Jubei's children while he flees from the law. He is the equivalent character to The Schofield Kid.
- Shioli Kutsuna as Natsume, a young prostitute disfigured by the Hotta brothers. After she brings Jubei the bounty owed for his services, he asks her to stay with Goro and take care of his children as he is wanted for murder. She is the equivalent character to Delilah Fitzgerald.
- Eiko Koike as Okaji, the leader of the prostitutes who arranges for the bounty on the Hotta brothers. She is the equivalent character to Strawberry Alice.
- Jun Kunimura as Masaharu Kitaoji, a former samurai who comes to claim the bounty on the Hotta brothers, bringing along a writer who is working on a biography that praises Kitaoji as a selfless hero. Oishi confronts Kitaoji, beats him severely, and exposes him as a shameless self-promoter, before sending him out of town in disgrace. He is the equivalent character to English Bob.
- Yukiyoshi Ozawa as Sanosuke Hotta, one of the two men who disfigured Natsume. He is the equivalent character to Quick Mike.
- Takahiro Miura as Unosuke Hotta, one of the two men who disfigured Natsume. He is the equivalent character to Davey Bunting.
- Kenichi Takitō as Yasaburo Himeji, a young writer hired by Kitaoji to write his biography, who initially believes everything Kitaoji tells him as he has no real knowledge of the samurai. When Oishi reveals the truth, Himeji abandons Kitaoji and plans to write a new biography for Oishi. After seeing him die at the hands of Jubei, the samurai orders Himeji to inform the Imperial authorities that he killed Oishi and the two brothers to protect Goro and his children. He is the equivalent character to W.W. Beauchamp.
- Yoshimasa Kondo as Kihachi, an innkeeper and brothel owner. Jubei kills him when he finds Kingo's corpse on display outside the inn. He is the equivalent character to Skinny Dubois.
- Go Jibiki as Hirata

== Production ==
Filming took place between mid-September to late November 2012. All filming took place in Hokkaido, Japan.

== Reception ==
The film holds a "fresh" rating of 94% on Rotten Tomatoes based on 17 reviews, with an average score of 6.60/10.
