= Like Father, Like Son (2013 film) =

2013 film by Hirokazu Kore-eda

- Film festival poster
- Directed by: Hirokazu Kore-eda
- Written by: Hirokazu Kore-eda
- Produced by: Kaoru Matsuzaki; Hijiri Taguchi
- Starring: Masaharu Fukuyama
- Cinematography: Mikiya Takimoto
- Edited by: Hirokazu Kore-eda
- Music by: Shin Yasui
- Distributed by: Amuse; Fuji Television Network; GAGA Corporation
- Release dates: 18 May 2013 (Cannes); 28 September 2013 (Japan)
- Running time: 120 minutes
- Country: Japan
- Language: Japanese
- Box office: $31.1 million

Like Father, Like Son (Japanese: そして父になる, Hepburn: Soshite Chichi ni Naru) is a 2013 Japanese drama film written, directed and edited by Hirokazu Kore-eda, starring Masaharu Fukuyama in his first role as a father. It premiered on 18 May 2013 at the 2013 Cannes Film Festival, where it was nominated for the Palme d'Or. After the screening, the audience welcomed the film with a ten-minute standing ovation, and director Kore-eda and Fukuyama were moved to tears. In a 25 May 2013 ceremony, it won the Jury Prize and a commendation from the Ecumenical Jury. The award sparked a significant response in Japan, and the national theatrical release was brought forward by a week, on 28 September 2013.

The film was also shown at the 2013 Toronto International Film Festival, and won both the Rogers People's Choice Award at the 2013 Vancouver International Film Festival and the Wuaki. TV Audience Award at the 2013 San Sebastián International Film Festival.

== Plot ==
Ryōta Nonomiya is a successful architect who is focused so much on work that he neglects his wife, Midori, and son, Keita. Upon his return home one day, Midori tells him that the hospital where Keita was born urgently needs to speak to them, and Ryōta senses trouble. After arriving at the hospital, the couple learn that their biological son Ryūsei was switched with Keita at birth, and after DNA tests prove the error, they must now make a life-changing decision to either keep Keita, the boy they raised as their own son, or exchange him for their biological son.

Ryōta and Midori soon meet with the other couple, Yukari and Yūdai Saiki, small-town folks who lack the money and drive that Ryōta possesses, but who have a better understanding of the importance of child and parent bonds. They share photos, and for the first time, Ryōta and Midori see their biological son, Ryūsei. After several meetings, they decide to exchange children for one Saturday. As the Saiki family has two other children, Ryōta suggests that he and Midori permanently take both boys, offending the other couple.

Both couples sue the hospital responsible for the mistake. During court proceedings, a nurse admits that she deliberately switched the babies; as a newlywed struggling to raise her stepchildren, she grew envious of the Nonomiyas' happiness and spitefully switched the children. Because the statute of limitations has expired, she cannot be charged for the crime.

After several more meetings, they finally decide to exchange children permanently. All four parents have difficulty accepting the loss of their previous sons, and the absence of the parents they used to know causes both boys to shut down emotionally, culminating in Ryūsei running away from the Nonomiyas' home and returning to the Saikis'. Ryōta picks up Ryūsei and brings him back home.

The Nonomiyas receive their share of the payout from the lawsuit, plus additional money from the nurse as an apology. Ryōta goes to the nurse's apartment to return the money and berate her for ruining his family, prompting her stepson to intervene to defend her.

Ryōta and Midori begin to bond with Ryūsei, who is also warming up to them. However, while going through the photos on his camera, Ryōta discovers a cache of photos of himself, mostly sleeping, that Keita took, and he breaks down crying.

Ryōta and Midori visit the Saiki family with Ryūsei, but Keita runs away from Ryōta. While following him, Ryōta apologizes to Keita for his failures as a father, and the two make amends. The film ends with the two returning to the Saikis', and both families entering the home.

== Cast ==
- Masaharu Fukuyama as Ryōta Nonomiya
- Machiko Ono as Midori Nonomiya
- Keita Ninomiya as Keita Nonomiya
- Shôgen Hwang as Ryūsei Saiki
- Yōko Maki as Yukari Saiki
- Lily Franky as Yūdai Saiki
- Jun Fubuki as Nobuko Nonomiya
- Isao Natsuyagi as Ryōsuke Nonomiya
- Jun Kunimura as Kazushi Kamiyama
- Kirin Kiki as Riko Ishizeki

== Themes and analysis ==
As pointed out by Nathan Southern of AllMovie, the film confronts two distant kinds of Japanese families coming from different social backgrounds and reflects opposing conceptions that coexist in contemporary Japanese society. These two families, as Mark Kermode notes on The Observer, are faced with the dilemma of retaining the children they have raised, on the basis of the bonds built with them over six years, or swap them and start over for the sake of blood lineage continuity.

Southern emphasizes Ryōta's transformation in dealing with this difficult choice: he is first convinced to make the swap, believing that the affinities with his biological son will emerge increasingly evident in the future. However, after several encounters with the Saiki family and the confrontations with Yūdai, who advises him not to neglect his family life, and after discovering photographs of him shot by Keita while he was asleep, he acknowledges his emotional bond with him.

Southern recalls two key sequences of the film, commenting that "Kore-eda has a poet's eye for human nuance": in the first scene, where Ryōta reviews Keita's snapshots, he remarks that Ryōta "discover[s] a part of himself that he never knew existed"; in the second one, where the two families casually pose together for a group photo, he witnesses how "we can see the differences not merely between the clans—one rigid and ascetic, one loose, emotionally free, and unrestricted—but between traditional and more modern Japanese conceptions of family."

David Cirone of J-Generation brings up the personal theme of balancing social norms with individual freedom, noting that Ryōta is "torn between his own expectations, those of his wife and family, and the mixed suggestions of those around him who all seem to know what's best for him and the children."

== Reception ==
=== Box office ===
In the opening weekend, the film topped the national ranking with 253,370 spectators and grossing ¥313.3 million. The film maintained the first position for two consecutive weeks, with 1,168,204 spectators and a box office revenue of ¥1.35 billion ($13.87 million in 2013) in the first 13 days, including pre-release days. It exceeded a revenue of ¥3 billion on 11 November, the 49th day of release, an uncommon achievement for an art film.

The final domestic box office revenue reported in January 2014 was ¥3.2 billion ($30 million).

=== Critical response ===
Like Father, Like Son received mostly positive reviews. On the film review aggregator website Rotten Tomatoes, it holds an 87% approval score, with an average rating of 7.6/10 based on 102 reviews. The site's consensus reads, "Sensitively written, smartly directed, and powerfully performed, Like Father, Like Son uses familiar-seeming elements to tell a thought-provoking story." Metacritic gives the film a score of 73 out of 100, based on reviews from 33 critics, indicating "generally favorable reviews".

Andrew Chan of the Film Critics Circle of Australia writes, "Essentially, Like Father, Like Son is one of those rare films that keep the audience totally engaged, thoroughly profound, fully emoted and ultimately refreshing. In the scale of perfect cinema, this stands quite close." On the website of The American Spectator, Eve Tushnet wrote that the film "has some of the striking Kore-eda trademarks: the extraordinary acting from the children; the symmetrical framing and musical pacing; and the shifts between long shots in which all the people look tiny and child's-eye shots where all the people look huge." Andrew Schenker of Slant Magazine wrote a lukewarm review, praising the cinematography but also saying, "The film scores all of its thematic points early [and] unfolds among fairly ordinary lines, hitting all of the expected moments, and simply waiting out the time until Ryota realizes the inevitable folly of his decision."

The film was the choice of Candice Frederick in IndieWire's 2018 list of the best Japanese films of the 21st century.

== Remake ==
In 2013, DreamWorks Pictures acquired remake rights to Like Father, Like Son after the film caught the eye of Steven Spielberg at Cannes. Chris and Paul Weitz were slated to direct but the project did not go forward. In 2020, an English-language version was reported to be in early development at Focus Features, with Lulu Wang to direct and playwright Sarah Ruhl to write.
