= 33rd Japan Academy Film Prize =

Japanese film awards in 2010

- Date: March 5, 2010
- Site: Grand Prince Hotel New Takanawa, Tokyo, Japan
- Hosted by: Tsutomu Sekine; Tae Kimura

The 33rd Japan Academy Film Prize (第33回日本アカデミー賞) ceremony was held on March 5, 2010, by the Japan Academy Film Prize Association to honor its selection of the best films of 2009. NTV broadcast the event, which took place at the Grand Prince Hotel New Takanawa in Tokyo, Japan. The nominations for the Awards were announced on December 22, 2009.

== Nominees ==
=== Awards ===
Picture of the Year	Animation of the Year
The Unbroken; Dear Doctor; Mt. Tsurugidake; Villon's Wife; Zero Focus	Summer Wars; Doraemon: The New Record of Nobita's Spaceblazer; Oblivion Island: Haruka and the Magic Mirror; Detective Conan: The Raven Chaser; Evangelion: 2.0 You Can (Not) Advance
Director of the Year	Screenplay of the Year
Daisaku Kimura – Mt. Tsurugidake; Miwa Nishikawa – Dear Doctor; Kichitaro Negishi – Villon's Wife; Setsurō Wakamatsu – The Unbroken; Isshin Inudo – Zero Focus	Miwa Nishikawa – Dear Doctor; Takuya Nishioka – The Unbroken; Yōzō Tanaka – Villon's Wife; Isshin Inudo and Kenji Nakazono – Zero Focus; Daisaku Kimura, Atsuo Kikuchi, Toshimasa Miyamura – Mt. Tsurugidake
Outstanding Performance by an Actor in a Leading Role	Outstanding Performance by an Actress in a Leading Role
Ken Watanabe – The Unbroken; Tadanobu Asano – Villon's Wife and Mt. Tsurugidake; Nao Omori – Hagetaka; Shōfukutei Tsurube – Dear Doctor	Takako Matsu – Villon's Wife; Aoi Miyazaki – Shonen Merikensack; Haruka Ayase – Oppai Volleyball; Bae Doona – Air Doll; Ryōko Hirosue – Zero Focus
Outstanding Performance by an Actor in a Supporting Role	Outstanding Performance by an Actress in a Supporting Role
Teruyuki Kagawa – Mt. Tsurugidake; Masato Sakai – General Rouge no Gaisen; Tetsuji Tamayama – Hagetaka; Eita – Dear Doctor; Tomokazu Miura – The Unbroken	Kimiko Yo – Dear Doctor; Kyōka Suzuki – The Unbroken; Miki Nakatani – Zero Focus; Tae Kimura – Zero Focus; Shigeru Muroi – Villon's Wife
Outstanding Achievement in Music	Outstanding Achievement in Cinematography
Shin'ichirō Ikebe – Mt. Tsurugidake; Kōji Ueno – Zero Focus; Norihito Sumitomo – The Unbroken; Shūto Mukai – Shonen Merikensack; Takashi Yoshimatsu – Villon's Wife	Daisaku Kimura – Mt. Tsurugidake; Takahide Shibanushi – Villon's Wife; Takahiro Tsutai – Zero Focus; Mutsuo Naganuma – The Unbroken; Katsumi Yanagishima – Dear Doctor
Outstanding Achievement in Lighting Direction	Outstanding Achievement in Art Direction
Takayuki Kawabe – Mt. Tsurugidake; Tatsuya Osada – Villon's Wife; Yoshitake Hikita – Zero Focus; Takeshi Nakasu – The Unbroken; Eiji Onoshita – Dear Doctor	Yōhei Taneda and Kyōko Yauchi – Villon's Wife; Fumio Ogawa – The Unbroken; Yukiharu Seshimo – Zero Focus; Yoshinobu Nishioka and Takashi Yoshida – Katen no Shiro; Katsuhiro Fukuzawa and Takaichi Wakamatsu – Mt. Tsurugidake
Outstanding Achievement in Sound Recording	Outstanding Achievement in Film Editing
Kenichi Ishidera – Mt. Tsurugidake; Kiyoshi Kakizawa – Villon's Wife; Hiromichi Koori – The Unbroken; Junichi Shima – Zero Focus; Mitsugu Shiratori and Hirokazu Katō – Dear Doctor	Takao Arai – The Unbroken; Keiichi Itagaki – Mt. Tsurugidake; Sōichi Ueno – Zero Focus; Akimasa Kawashima – Villon's Wife; Ryūji Miyajima – Dear Doctor
Outstanding Foreign Language Film	Newcomer of the Year
Gran Torino; Slumdog Millionaire; Changeling; The Wrestler; Red Cliff: Part II	Masaki Okada – Honokaa Boy, I Give My First Love to You, Jūryoku Piero; Hiro Mizushima – Drop; Junpei Mizobata – Threads of Destiny; Daichi Watanabe – Shikisoku Zenereishōn; Nana Eikura – April Bride; Mirai Shida – Dare mo Mamotte Kurenai; Airi Taira – 20th Century Boys
Award for Distinguished Service from the Chairman	Special Award of Honour from the Association
Tsuribaka Nisshi series (Toshiyuki Nishida, Rentarō Mikuni)	Hisaya Morishige
Special Award from the Chairman	Special Award from the Association
Gengon Nakaoka (Lighting); Shūe Matsubayashi (Director); Yoshirō Muraki (Art Director)	Sumiko Haneda (Documentary Writer); Yukio Hokari (Sound Effect); Kiyoshi Matsushita; Takashi Matsuda (Costume)
Popularity Award	
Amalfi: Rewards of the Goddess (Production Category); Haruka Ayase – Oppai Volleyball (Actor Category)	
