= Index of Japan-related articles (F) =

This page lists Japan-related articles with romanized titles beginning with the letter F. For names of people, please list by surname (i.e., "Tarō Yamada" should be listed under "Y", not "T"). Please also ignore particles (e.g. "a", "an", "the") when listing articles (i.e., "A City with No People" should be listed under "City").

== F ==
- F&C Asset Management
- F-Zero

== Fa ==
- Famicom Disk System
- Fancy Lala
- Fanservice
- Fat Man
- Fatal Fury

== Fc ==
- FCI

== Fe ==
- February 26 incident
- Feel My Heart
- Feudalism

== Fi ==
- Fifth generation computer
- Fighter (Dungeons & Dragons)
- Final Fantasy (series)
- Final Fantasy (video game)
- Final Fantasy II
- Final Fantasy III
- Final Fantasy III (Nintendo DS)
- Final Fantasy IV
- Final Fantasy V
- Final Fantasy VI
- Final Fantasy VII
- Final Fantasy VIII
- List of Final Fantasy VII terms
- Final Fantasy IX
- Final Fantasy X
- Final Fantasy X-2
- Final Fantasy XI
- Final Fantasy Anthology
- Final Fantasy Chronicles
- Final Fantasy Crystal Chronicles (series)
- Final Fantasy Legend
- Final Fantasy Origins
- Final Fantasy Tactics
- Final Fantasy Tactics Advance
- Final Fantasy: The Spirits Within
- Final Fight
- Final Lap
- Fire balloon
- Fire Emblem
- First Kurushima-Kaikyo Bridge
- Fist of the North Star
- Five kings of Wa
- Five Mountain System

== Fl ==
- Flag of Japan
- FLCL

== Fo ==
- Foreign relations of Japan
- Foreign-born Japanese
- Tsuguharu Foujita
- Four Heavenly Kings
- Four Hitokiri of the Bakumatsu
- Four-character idiom

== Fr ==
- Freeters
- Freeza
- Front Mission
- Fruits Basket

== Fu ==
- Mitsuo Fuchida
- Hakuyō Fuchikami
- Fuchū, Hiroshima (city)
- Fuchū, Hiroshima (Aki)
- Fuchū, Tokyo
- Fudaishi
- Fuefuki, Yamanashi
- Kinji Fukasaku
- Fuji
- Fuji Bank
- Fuji District, Shizuoka
- Fuji Heavy Industries, Ltd.
- Fuji Rock Festival
- Fuji Television
- Fuji-Hakone-Izu National Park
- Fuji, Saga
- Fuji, Shizuoka
- Fujieda, Shizuoka
- Fujifilm
- Fujihashi, Gifu
- Kano Fujihira
- Fujii Sadakazu
- Fujiidera, Osaka
- Fujikawa, Shizuoka
- Fujiko Fujio
- Fujimi, Saitama
- Alberto Fujimori
- Fujimoto Kazuko
- Shinichi Fujimura
- Fujinomiya, Shizuoka
- Masayuki Fujio
- Fujioka
- Fujioka, Aichi
- Fujioka, Gunma
- Fujioka, Tochigi
- Kōsuke Fujishima
- Fujisawa, Kanagawa
- Tōru Fujisawa
- Fujita Airlines
- Tokiyasu Fujita
- Fujitsu
- Fujitsu District, Saga
- Fujiwara family
- Fujiwara no Michinaga
- Fujiwara no Mototsune
- Fujiwara no Yoshifusa
- Fujiyoshida, Yamanashi
- Kyoko Fukada
- Fukagawa, Hokkaidō
- Fukaya, Saitama
- Fukayasu District, Hiroshima
- Fuke-shū
- Fukiage, Kagoshima
- Fukube, Tottori
- Fukuchiyama, Kyoto
- Fukuda Eiko
- Takeo Fukuda
- Fukude, Shizuoka
- Fukudomi, Saga
- Fukue, Nagasaki
- Fukue, Yamaguchi
- Fukui Prefecture
- Fukui, Fukui
- Toshihiko Fukui
- Fukuishi Kannon
- Fukuma, Fukuoka
- Fukuoka, Fukuoka
- Fukuoka, Gifu
- Fukuoka Airport
- Fukuoka Daiei Hawks
- Fukuoka Prefecture
- Masanobu Fukuoka
- Fukuroi, Shizuoka
- Fukusaki, Hyogo
- Fukushima Prefecture
- Fukushima, Fukushima
- Fukushima, Hokkaidō
- Mizuho Fukushima
- Fukushima Prefecture
- Fukushima Yasumasa
- Fukutomi, Hiroshima
- Fukuyama, Hiroshima
- Fukuyama, Kagoshima
- Fukuyama congenital muscular dystrophy
- Masaharu Fukuyama
- Yoshiki Fukuyama
- Fukuzawa Yukichi
- Full contact karate
- Fullmetal Alchemist
- Full Metal Panic!
- Funabashi, Chiba
- Funai District, Kyoto
- Funakoshi Gichin
- Funao, Okayama
- Funaoka, Tottori
- Funo, Hiroshima
- Furano, Hokkaidō
- Furanui
- Furigana
- Yasuo Furuhata
- Furukawa, Miyagi
- Fuse, Shimane
- Fushigi Yūgi
- Fussa, Tokyo
- Futaba Channel
- Futabatei Shimei
- Futami District, Hiroshima
- Futami, Ehime
- Futami, Mie
- Futanari
- Futon
- Futtsu, Chiba
- Fuwa District, Gifu
