= Tae Kimura =

Japanese actress (born 1971)

- 木村 多江
- Born: March 16, 1971 (age 55); Tokyo, Japan
- Occupation: Actress
- Years active: 1995—present
- Agent: Yūgō Jimusho

Tae Kimura (木村 多江, Kimura Tae; born March 16, 1971) is a Japanese actress. She won the Best Actress award at the 32nd Japan Academy Prize for All Around Us.

== Biography ==
Kimura starred in Ryosuke Hashiguchi's All Around Us. Her performance in the film was described by Jason Gray as "one of the most accurate portrayals of someone suffering from depression I've ever seen."

She co-starred in Isshin Inudo's Zero Focus with Miki Nakatani and Ryōko Hirosue, and starred in Makoto Shinozaki's Tokyo Island.

She appeared in Miwa Nishikawa's Dreams for Sale.

== Filmography ==
=== Films ===
- Hana and Alice (2004)
- Infection (2004) – 2nd nurse
- All About My Dog (2005)
- Densha Otoko (2005)
- Oh! Oku (2006)
- Kaidan (2007)
- All Around Us (2008)
- Shizumanu Taiyō (2009)
- Zero Focus (2009)
- Tokyo Island (2010)
- Yoake no Machi de (2011)
- Dreams for Sale (2012)
- Monsterz (2014)
- The Case of Hana & Alice (2015)
- Have a Song on Your Lips (2015)
- Gold Medal Man (2016)
- Kōfuku no Alibi (2016)
- Cat Collector's House (2017)
- Yurigokoro (2017)
- Homecoming (2017), Sayoko
- Good-Bye (2020), Shizue Tajima
- Not Quite Dead Yet (2020)
- The Supporting Actors: The Movie (2021), Herself
- Your Turn to Kill: The Movie (2021)
- Cottontail (2022), Akiko
- Prior Convictions (2022), Emma Miyaguchi
- My Home Hero: The Movie (2024), Kasen Tosu
- 90 Years Old – So What? (2024), Mariko Kikkawa
- The Final Piece (2025), Yoshiko Karasawa
- The Last Man: The Movie – First Love (2025)
- This Is I (2026), Hatsue
- Mr. Osomatsu: Project Slackers (2026), Matsuyo Matsuno
- Never After Dark (2026)
- First Voice (2026), Yuriko Miyamoto

=== Television ===
- Ring: The Final Chapter (1999)
- Hōjō Tokimune (2001), Takako
- Unfair (2006)
- Masshiro (2015)
- Antarctica (2011), Furutachi Ayako
- Taira no Kiyomori (2012), Hotoke Gozen
- Daddy Sister (2016), Kimiko Kohashi
- Your Turn to Kill (2019), Sanae Enomoto
- 24 Japan (2020), Rikka Shidō
- Involvement in Family Affairs (2022), Kumi Miyama
- Last Man:The Blind Profiler (2023), Deborah Jean Hongō
- What Will You Do, Ieyasu? (2023), Nabe
- My Home Hero (2023), Kasen Tosu
- The Last Man: The Blind Profiler (2023)
- Alice in Wonderful Kitchen (2024), Makiko Gojō
- House of Ninjas (2024), Yoko Tawara
- Happy Kanako's Killer Life (2025), Kanako's mother
