= Shigeru Muroi =

Japanese actress (born 1958)

- Born: October 22, 1958 (age 67); Namerikawa, Toyama, Japan
- Occupation: Actress
- Years active: 1979–present

Shigeru Muroi (室井 滋, Muroi Shigeru; born October 22, 1958 in Namerikawa, Toyama Prefecture) is a Japanese actress. She won the award for Best Supporting Actress at the 19th Hochi Film Awards for Izakaya Yūrei. She is known for her role as Reiko Onda on Yappari Neko ga Suki series. she also starred in two television drama series Shinryounaikai Ryoko and Koritsuku Natsu in late 90's.

== Filmography ==
=== Film ===
- Something Like It (1981) – Aya
- Burst City (1982)
- Female Prisoner: Cage (1983) – Miwa
- Koisuru Onnatachi (1986)
- Leave My Girl Alone (1986)
- Bu Su (1987) – Ponta
- Bakayaro! I'm Plenty Mad (1988) – Nanako Sakisaka
- Izakaya Yūrei (1994) – Shizuko
- Whisper of the Heart (1995) – Asako Tsukishima (voice)
- Tsuribaka Nisshi 8 (1996)
- Nodo Jiman (1999) – Reiko Akagi (Suzuko Fujimoto)
- Villon's Wife (2009) – Miyo
- No Longer Human (2010) – Kotobuki
- The Little House (2014) – Sadako
- A Living Promise (2016) – Yoshiko Nishimura
- Day and Night (2019)
- Angry Rice Wives (2021)
- Jigoku no Hanazono: Office Royale (2021)
- The Sound of Grass (2021)
- 7 Secretaries: The Movie (2022) – Satsuki Wanibuchi
- Familia (2023)
- Strangers in Kyoto (2025) – Tamaki Shibusawa
- Happy End (2025) – narrator
- Bridge of Avidya (2025) – Misae

=== Television ===
- Mujaki na Kankei (1984) – Masae Fujita
- Uchi no Ko ni Kagitte... (1984) – Mr. Kosaka's lover
- Uchi no Ko ni Kagitte... 2 (1985) – Sakie
- Kinpachi-sensei Season 3 (1988) – Machi Tahara
- Yappari Neko ga Suki (1988-1990) - Reiko Onda
- Gift (1997) – Naomi Koshigoe
- Shinryounaikai Ryoko (1997) - Ryoko Mochizuki
- Koritsuku Natsu (1998) - Natsuki Oikawa
- AIBOU Season 2 (2003–2004) – Ryōko Mitsumine
- The Great Horror Family (2004) – Yuko Imawano
- 14-sai no Haha (2006) – Shizuka Kirino
- 4 Shimai Tantei Dan (2008) – Miyamoto Kazuyo
- Samurai High School (2009) – Kyoko Kamei
- Bartender (2011) – Sanae Suwa
- Jin (2011) – Otose
- Renai Neet: Wasureta Koi no Hajimekata (2012) – Hiromi Amamiya
- Doctor-X: Surgeon Michiko Daimon (2012) – Kaneko Terayama
- Hanako and Anne (2014) – Fuji Ando
- Shizumanu Taiyō (2016)
- 7 Secretaries (2020) – Satsuki Wanibuchi

=== Japanese dub ===
- Benny the Hunchback (1999) – Boujee
- Finding Nemo (2003) – Dory
- Finding Dory (2016) – Dory

== Awards and nominations ==
Year	Award	Category	Work	Result	Ref.
1994	19th Hochi Film Award	Best Supporting Actress	Izakaya Yūrei	Won	
1994	37th Blue Ribbon Awards	Best Supporting Actress	Izakaya Yūrei	Won	
1994	49th Mainichi Film Awards	Best Supporting Actress	Izakaya Yūrei	Won	
1994	68th Kinema Jumpo Awards	Best Supporting Actress	Izakaya Yūrei	Won	
1995	18th Japan Academy Film Prize	Best Supporting Actress	Izakaya Yūrei	Won	
1999	23rd Japan Academy Film Prize	Best Actress	Nodo Jiman	Nominated	
2009	33rd Japan Academy Film Prize	Best Supporting Actress	Villon's Wife	Nominated	
2015	36th Matsuo Performing Arts Award	Excellence Award (Television)		Won	
