= Zero Focus =

1961 Japanese film

- Theatrical poster
- ゼロの焦点
- Directed by: Yoshitaro Nomura
- Written by: Shinobu Hashimoto; Yoji Yamada
- Based on: Zero no shōten by Seicho Matsumoto
- Produced by: Ichinosuke Hozumi
- Starring: Yoshiko Kuga
- Cinematography: Takashi Kawamata
- Edited by: Yoshiyasu Hamamura
- Music by: Yasushi Akutagawa
- Production company: Shochiku
- Distributed by: Shochiku
- Release date: 19 March 1961 (Japan)
- Running time: 95 minutes
- Country: Japan
- Language: Japanese

Zero Focus (ゼロの焦点, Zero no shōten) is a 1961 Japanese crime drama film directed by Yoshitarō Nomura, and co-written by Shinobu Hashimoto and Yoji Yamada. It is based on the novel of the same name by Seichō Matsumoto. A remake of the film was released in 2009.

== Plot ==
One week into newlywed Teiko Uhara's marriage, her husband, ad agency manager Kenichi, leaves on a short business trip to Kanazawa and doesn't return. With a pair of old photographs she found among his belongings, Teiko travels across Japan to search for him, first with the help of her husband's employer, later on her own. After a series of mysterious deaths, including a reception girl of the agency's Kanazawa branch, who turns out to be Kenichi's common law wife, and Kenichi's alleged suicide, all clues lead to Sachiko Murota, wife of a wealthy business partner of her husband. Teiko confronts Mrs. Murota and blames her for murdering Kenichi and everyone who knew of her past as a prostitute in the post-war era. Yet, as Mrs. Murota's confession reveals, the truth is even more complex than that.

== Cast ==
- Yoshiko Kuga as Teiko Uhara
- Hizuru Takachiho as Sachiko Murota / Emmy
- Ineko Arima as Hisako Tanuma / Sally
- Koji Nambara as Kenichi Uhara / Masuzaburo Sone
- Kō Nishimura as Sōtarō Uhara
- Yoshi Katō as Gisaku Murota
- Sadako Sawamura as Sōtarō's wife
- Takanobu Hozumi as Mr. Honda

== Awards ==
- 1961 Blue Ribbon Award for Best Supporting Actress (Hizuru Takachiho)

== Legacy ==
Seicho Matsumoto's novel was again adapted in 2009 by Isshin Inudō with Ryōko Hirosue as Teiko Uhara.
