= Michel Muller =

French actor, screenwriter and director (born 1966)

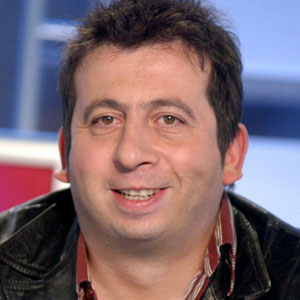
- Born: 9 September 1966 (age 60); Vienna, Austria
- Occupations: Actor, comedian
- Years active: 1994–2017

Michel Muller (born 9 September 1966) is a French actor, comedian, screenwriter and director. He is most recently known for playing Charles VIII of France in the television series The Borgias.

== Biography ==
Michel Muller was born 1966 in Vienna, Austria. He left graduate school to pursue a career in entertainment. He started as a one-man show performer, performing in theaters across France. He appeared in various French television series and in minor film roles. In 2001, he starred in Wasabi, alongside Jean Reno and Ryōko Hirosue.

During the 2000s, he enjoyed success as a comedian, specializing in dark humor.

He won a Genie Award for Best Supporting Actor in 2007 for his role in The Little Book of Revenge (Guide de la petite vengeance).

In 2011, he appeared in seven episodes of The Borgias.

== Filmography ==
=== Film ===
Year	Title	Role	Notes
1998	La voie est libre	Station clerk	
1998	Train of Life	Yossi	
1998	American Cuisine	Tax inspector	
1999	Asterix & Obelix Take on Caesar	Malosinus	
1999	Comme un poisson hors de l'eau	Désiré	
1999	Recto/Verso	Joël	
2000	Taxi 2	Pregnant Woman's Husband	
2000	Deep in the Woods	Le policier	
2001	Wasabi	Maurice 'Momo'	
2003	Fanfan la Tulipe	Tranche Montagne	
2003	Mean Spirit	Simon Variot	
2004	Les Dalton	Bank director	
2005	La vie de Michel Muller est plus belle que la vôtre	As himself	Also director
2005	La vie est à nous !	La Puce	
2006	The Little Book of Revenge (Guide de la petite vengeance)	Robert	Genie Award for Best Performance by an Actor in a Supporting Role
2008	Leur morale... et la nôtre	Bricol	
2009	The High Life	Félix	
2009	Tragédie Grouick		Short film

=== Television ===
Year	Title	Role	Notes
1994	La colline aux mille enfants	Hugo	Television movie
2007	Hénaut président	Hénaut	
2007	Confidences		Miniseries
2009	Suite noire	Assureur	Episode: Vitrage à la corde.
2010	En chantier, monsieur Tanner!	Jeff	Television movie
2011	Les petits meurtres d'Agatha Christie	Jean-Charles Humbert	Episode: Cinq petits cochons.
2011	The Borgias	Charles VIII of France	Episodes: The French King; Death, on a Pale Horse; The Art of War; Nessuno (Nobody).
2016	Republican Gangsters	Gérard Balleroy	TV Series (6 Episodes)
