= Kōnokawa Station =

Railway station in Iyo, Ehime Prefecture, Japan

S07 Kōnokawa Station 高野川駅
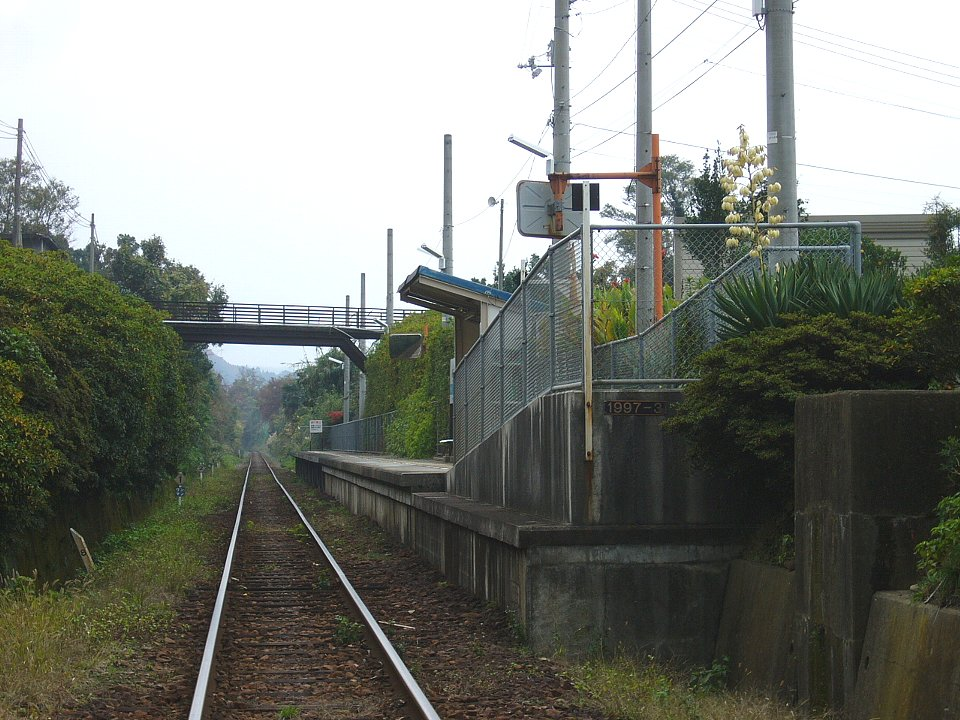
- Kōnokawa Station, December 2006

General information
- Location: Futamicho Konokawa, Iyo City, Ehime Prefecture 799-3201; Japan
- Coordinates: 33°42′06″N 132°39′32″E
- Operator: JR Shikoku
- Line: Yosan Line
- Distance: 213.9 km (132.9 mi) from Takamatsu
- Platforms: 1 side platform
- Tracks: 1

Construction
- Structure type: At grade
- Cycle facilities: Bike shed
- Accessible: Yes - ramp to platform

Other information
- Status: Unstaffed
- Station code: S07

History
- Opened: 1 February 1963; 63 years ago

Passengers
- FY2019: 70

Services
Preceding station	JR Shikoku	Following station
Iyo-Kaminada S08 towards Uwajima	Yosan Line via Iyo-Nagahama	Mukaibara U06 S06 towards Takamatsu
Location
- Location within Ehime Prefecture Location within Japan

Kōnokawa Station (高野川駅, Kōnokawa-eki) is a passenger railway station located in the city of Iyo, Ehime Prefecture, Japan. It is operated by JR Shikoku and has the station number "S07".

== Lines ==
Kōnokawa Station is served by the JR Shikoku Yosan Line and is located 213.9 km from the beginning of the line at Takamatsu. Only Yosan Line local trains stop at the station and the eastbound trains stop at Matsuyama. Connections with other services are needed to travel further east of Matsuyama on the line.

== Layout ==
The station consists of a side platform serving a single track. There is no station building, only a simple shelter for waiting passengers. A ramp leads down to the platform from the access road which is on a higher level.

== History ==
Japanese National Railways (JNR) opened the station as an added stop on the existing Yosan Line on 1 February 1963. With the privatization of JNR on 1 April 1987, control of the station passed to JR Shikoku.

== Surrounding area ==
- Japan National Route 378

== See also ==
- List of railway stations in Japan
