= Iyo-Kaminada Station =

Railway station in Iyo, Ehime Prefecture, Japan

S08 Iyo-Kaminada Station 伊予上灘駅
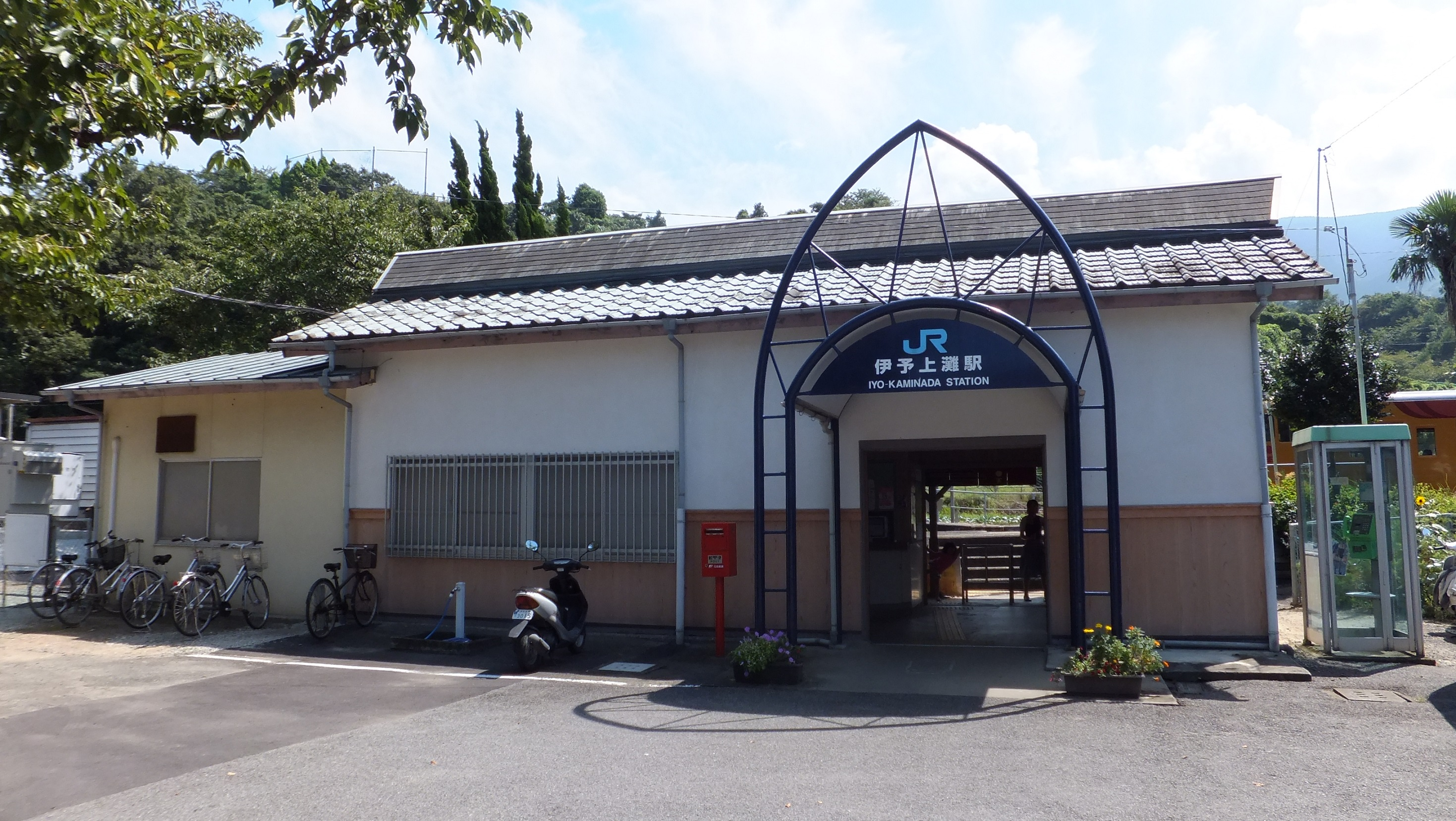
- Iyo-Kaminada Station in 2015

General information
- Location: Futamicho Takagishi, Iyo City, Ehime Prefecture 799-3207; Japan
- Coordinates: 33°41′01″N 132°38′00″E
- Operator: JR Shikoku
- Line: Yosan Line
- Distance: 217.1 km (134.9 mi) from Takamatsu
- Platforms: 2 side platforms
- Tracks: 2 + 1 siding

Construction
- Structure type: At grade
- Parking: Available
- Accessible: No - level crossing with steps needed to access opposite platform

Other information
- Status: Unstaffed
- Station code: S08

History
- Opened: 1 December 1932; 93 years ago

Passengers
- FY2019: 170

Services
Preceding station	JR Shikoku	Following station
Shimonada S09 towards Uwajima	Yosan Line via Iyo-Nagahama	Kōnokawa S07 towards Takamatsu
Location
- Location within Ehime Prefecture Location within Japan

Iyo-Kaminada Station (伊予上灘駅, Iyo-Kaminada-eki) is a passenger railway station located in the city of Iyo, Ehime Prefecture, Japan. It is operated by JR Shikoku and has the station number "S08".

== Lines ==
Iyo-Kaminada Station is served by the JR Shikoku Yosan Line and is located 217.1 km from the beginning of the line at Takamatsu. Only Yosan Line local trains stop at the station and the eastbound trains stop at Matsuyama. Connections with other services are needed to travel further east of Matsuyama on the line.

== Layout ==
The station consists of two side platforms serving two tracks. A station building, which is unstaffed, serves as a waiting room. The platforms are linked by a level crossing at either end. A siding branches off the track on the side of the station building. Parking is available at the station forecourt. There is a public telephone callbox outside the station building.

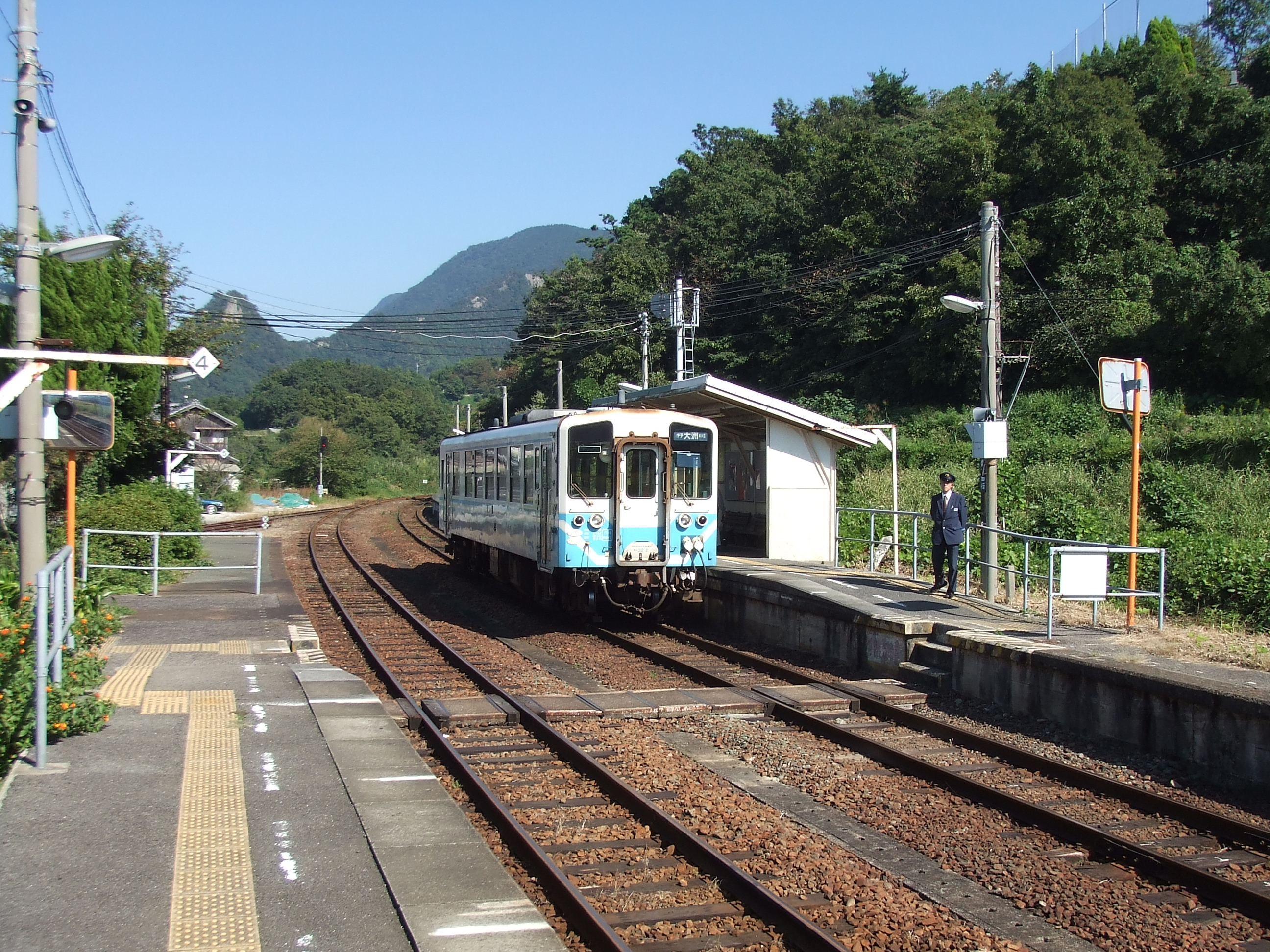
A view of the platforms looking in the direction of Matsuyama. The branch siding can be seen to the left. The level crossing with steps is just in front of the train.

== History ==
Iyo-Kaminada Station was opened on 1 December 1932 as the terminus of the Yosan line which had been extended westwards from Iyoshi. It became a through-station on 9 June 1935 when the line (renamed the Yosan Mainline on 1 August 1932) was further extended to Shimonada. At that time the station was operated by Japanese Government Railways (JGR), later becoming Japanese National Railways (JNR). With the privatization of JNR on 1 April 1987, control of the station passed to JR Shikoku.

== Surrounding area ==
- Nadamachi Beach
- Futami Seaside Park
- Museum of the setting sun
- Japan National Route 378

== See also ==
- List of railway stations in Japan
