= Fujioka =

Fujioka may refer to:

- Fujioka, Aichi, a former town located in Nishikamo District, Aichi, Japan
- Fujioka, Gunma, a city in Gunma, Japan
- Fujioka, Tochigi, a former town located in Shimotsuga District, Tochigi, Japan

== People ==
- Fujioka (surname)
