= Iyo, Ehime =

Iyo 伊予市
- City
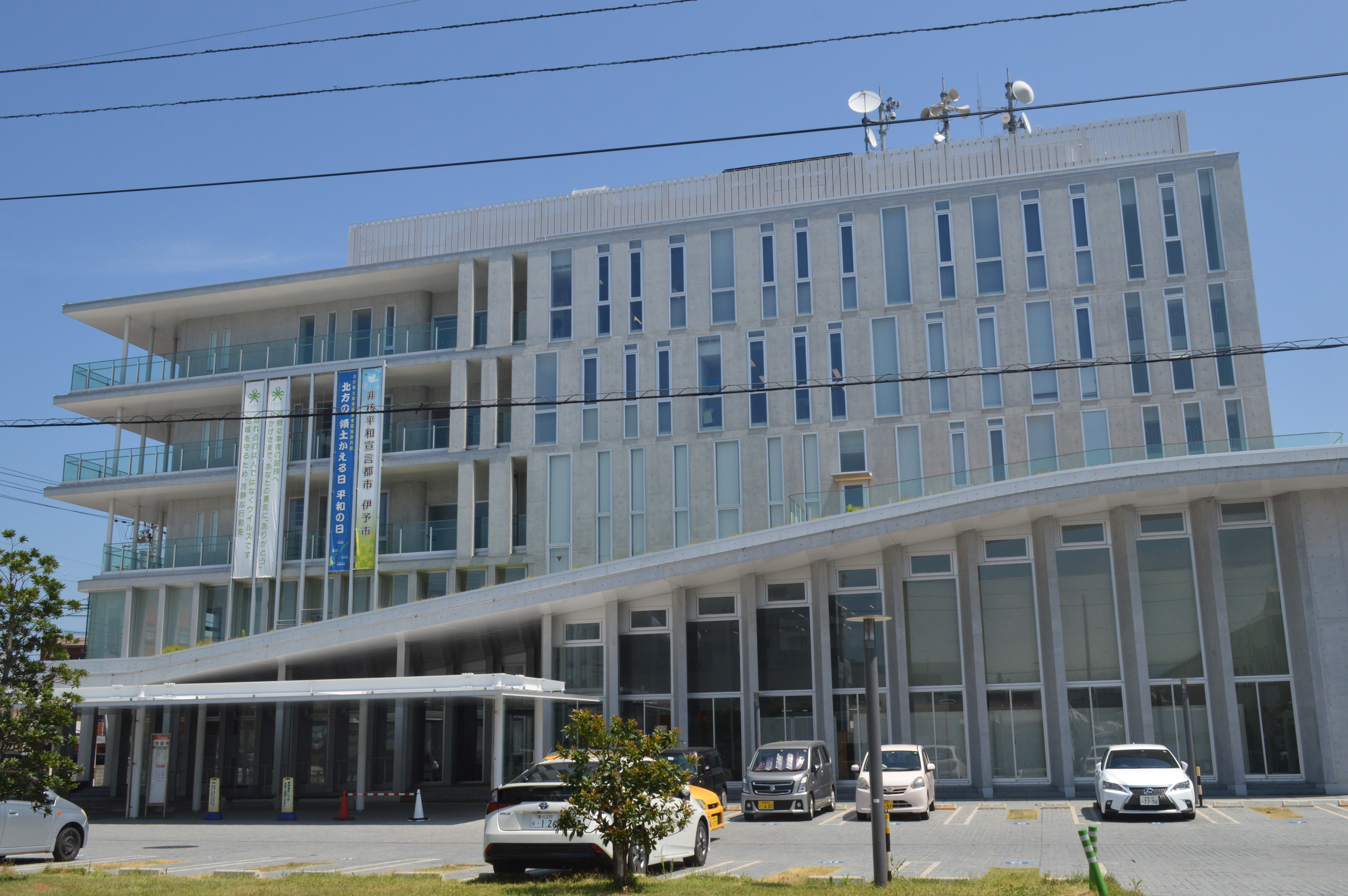
- Iyo City Hall

- Flag Seal

- Interactive map of Iyo
- Location in Japan
- Coordinates: 33°45′N 132°42′E
- Country: Japan
- Region: Shikoku
- Prefecture: Ehime

Government
  - Mayor: Kuninori Takechi

Area
  - Total: 194.44 km^{2} (75.07 sq mi)

Population (August 31, 2022)
  - Total: 35,888
  - Density: 184.57/km^{2} (478.04/sq mi)
- Time zone: UTC+09:00 (JST)
- City hall address: 820 Kominato, Iyo-shi, Ehime-ken 799-3193
- Website: Official website
- Symbols
- Flower: Rapeseed blossom (Brassica napus)
- Tree: Metasequoia

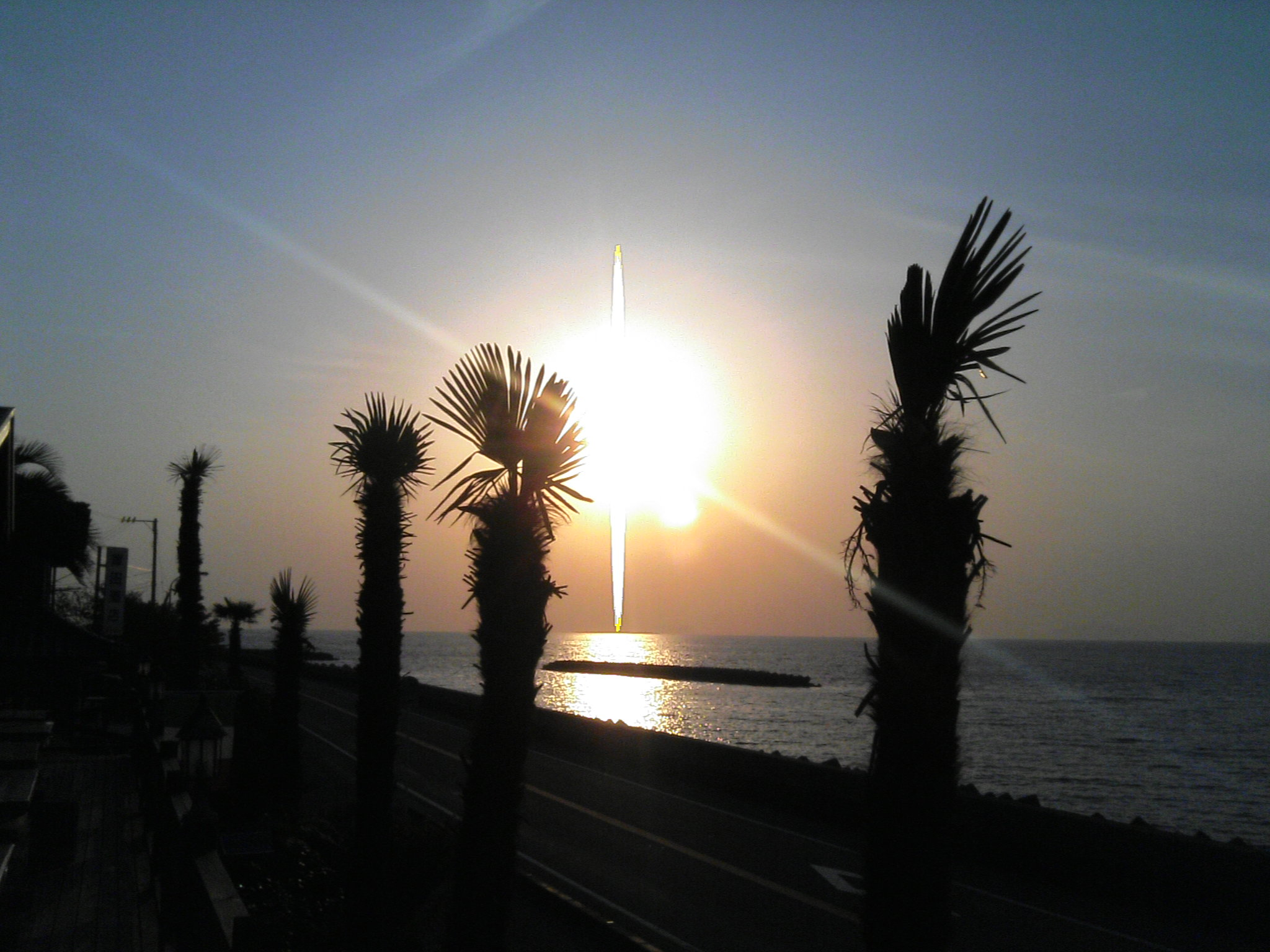
The sunset seen from the scenic Futami coast

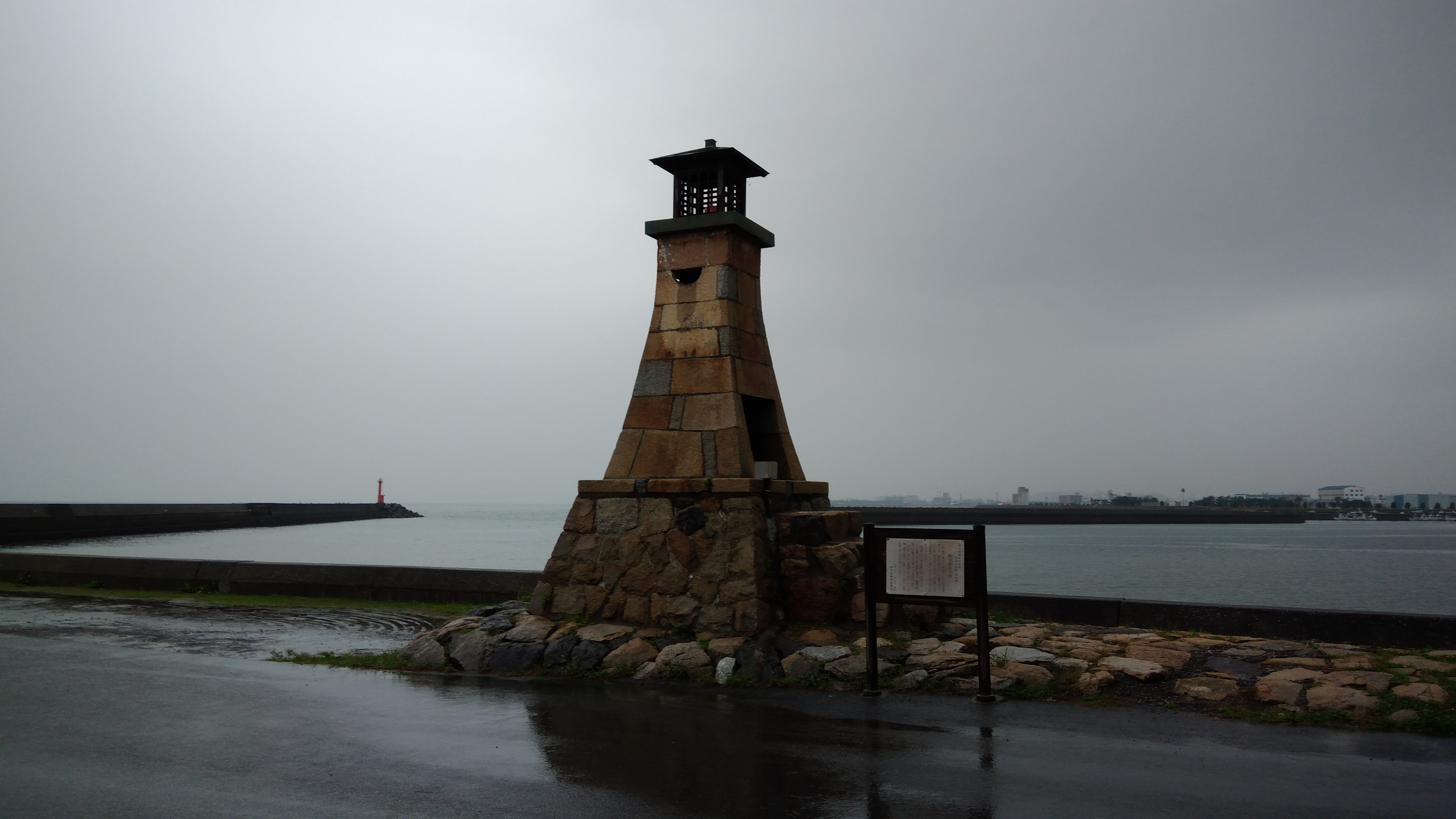
Goshikihama Park Lighthouse

Iyo (伊予市, Iyo-shi; Japanese pronunciation: [í.jò̞, ì.jó̞.ɕì]) is a city located in Ehime Prefecture, Japan. As of 31 March 2022, the city had an estimated population of 35,888 in 16169 households and a population density of 180 persons per km^{2}. The total area of the city is 194.44 square kilometres (75.07 sq mi).

== Geography ==
Iyo is situated in the center of Ehime, approximately ten kilometers southwest of the prefectural capital of Matsuyama. The western portion of the city, from Gunchū in the north down to Futami's Shimonada in the south, hug the coast of the Inland Sea, nestled in the southwestern section of the Dogo Plain. The southeastern portion of the city enters into the mountains in the interior of the prefecture, and the Nakayama area in particular is quite mountainous.

=== Neighbouring municipalities ===
Ehime Prefecture

- Masaki to the north
- Tobe to the east
- Uchiko and Ōzu to the south

=== Climate ===
Iyo has a humid subtropical climate (Köppen Cfa) characterized by warm summers and cool winters with light snowfall. The average annual temperature in Iyo is 15.2 °C. The average annual rainfall is 1770 mm with September as the wettest month. The temperatures are highest on average in August, at around 26.1 °C, and lowest in January, at around 4.5 °C.

== Demographics ==
Per Japanese census data, the population of Iyo has decreased slowly since the 1950s.

Historical population
Year	Pop.	±%
1920	37,394	—
1930	39,638	+6.0%
1940	39,469	−0.4%
1950	52,614	+33.3%
1960	49,106	−6.7%
1970	42,612	−13.2%
1980	42,843	+0.5%
1990	41,516	−3.1%
2000	40,505	−2.4%
2010	38,017	−6.1%
2020	35,133	−7.6%

== History ==
Iyo is part of ancient Iyo province. While archaeological artifacts show that the Iyo area has been settled since at least as far back as the Yayoi period (300 BC to 250 AD), the origins of the present city of Iyo can be traced back to the year 1635, when the Matsuyama han ceded the territory including Iyo to the Ōzu Domain. The port at Gunchū, the heart of present-day Iyo, became the main commercial port for Ōzu Domain and the surrounding community flourished. The town of Gunchū was established with the creation of the modern municipalities system on December 15, 1889.

On January 1, 1955, the town of Gunchū was merged with the villages of Kita-yamasaki, Minami-yamasaki and Minami-iyo to form the city of Iyo. On April 1, 2005, Iyo absorbed the towns of Nakayama and Futami (both from Iyo District), raising its population to over 40,000 and nearly quadrupling its area. The seal of the city of Iyo incorporates the red of the sunset of Futami, the green of Nakayama, and the blue of the original Iyo city seal.

== Government ==
Iyo has a mayor-council form of government with a directly elected mayor and a unicameral city council of 18 members. Iyo contributes one member to the Ehime Prefectural Assembly.

In terms of national politics, the city is part of Ehime 3rd district of the lower house of the Diet of Japan. Prior to 2022, the city was part of Ehime 4th district.

== Economy ==
Iyo houses the national headquarters for Marutomo and Yamaki, food manufacturing companies that specialize in dried Bonito flakes. Other main products include mikan and Nakayama chestnuts and other fruits and vegetables. In addition, Futami has had some success in making its sunset a local tourist draw, creating a seaside park, a sunset museum and an annual sunset concert at its Shimonada Station.

== Education ==
Iyo has nine public elementary schools and four public middle schools operated by the city government. The city has one public high school operated by the Ehime Prefectural Board of Education.

== Transportation ==
=== Railways ===
Shikoku Railway Company - Yosan Line

- Minami-Iyo - Iyo-Yokota - Torinoki - Iyoshi - Mukaibara - Kōnokawa - Iyo-Kaminada - Shimonada - Kushi

Iyotetsu Gunchū Line

- Shinkawa - Gunchū - Gunchū Port

=== Highways ===
- Matsuyama Expressway
- National Route 56
- National Route 378

== Notable individuals from Iyo ==
- Masanobu Fukuoka
- Daichi Kamada
