= Blooming Again =

- Author: Ranzō Ōta
- Original title: 死に花 (Shinibana)
- Language: Japanese
- Publication date: 2003
- Publication place: Japan

Blooming Again (死に花, "Shinibana") is a 2003 novel by Ranzō Ōta. It has been adapted into a film by Isshin Inudo in 2004.

== Film Adaptation ==
- Blooming Again directed by Isshin Inudo, a Toei production in 2004, it stars Tsutomu Yamazaki. Hisaya Morishige and Takuya Fujioka made their final film appearance in the film.

Blooming Again
- Directed by: Isshin Inudo
- Screenplay by: Hirotoshi Kobayashi, Isshin Indo
- Based on: Shinibana
- Starring: Tsutomu Yamazaki
- Cinematography: Naoki Kayano
- Edited by: Hirohide Abe
- Music by: Yoshikazu Suo
- Distributed by: Toho
- Release date: May 8, 2004 (Japan)
- Running time: 120 minutes
- Country: Japan
- Language: Japanese

=== Cast ===
- Tsutomu Yamazaki as Makoto Kikushima
- Ken Utsui as Kōtarō Inō
- Yukio Aoshima as Yoshio Nagaike
- Kei Tani as Shōji
- Isamu Nagato as Rokubei Sakiyama
- Takuya Fujioka as Kinzō Genda
- Asei Kobayashi as Shujirō Akahoshi
- Chieko Matsubara as Suzuko Asuka
- Haruko Katō as Sadako Tōyama
- Hisaya Morishige as Rokusaburō Aoki
