= The Little Book of Revenge =

- French: Guide de la petite vengeance
- Directed by: Jean-François Pouliot
- Written by: Ken Scott
- Produced by: Roger Frappier; Luc Vandal
- Starring: Marc Béland; Michel Muller; Gabriel Gascon; Pascale Bussières
- Cinematography: Allen Smith
- Edited by: Dominique Fortin
- Music by: Benoît Charest
- Distributed by: TVA Films
- Release date: November 17, 2006
- Running time: 105 minutes
- Country: Canada
- Language: French
- Budget: $7,100,000

The Little Book of Revenge (French: Guide de la petite vengeance) is a Genie nominated French language Canadian film released in 2006.

== Plot ==
Bernard, an accountant in a jewelry store, plots revenge against his abusive employer, Monsieur Vendôme, with the help of his friend Robert.

== Cast ==
- Marc Béland : Bernard
- Michel Muller : Robert
- Gabriel Gascon : Vendôme
- Pascale Bussières : Sandrine
- Alice Morel-Michaud : Lili
- Marie-Christine Adam : Damaris

== Reaction ==
The film earned four Genie Award nominations: Best Achievement in Direction, Best Motion Picture, Best Performance by an Actor in a Supporting Role and for Best Original Screenplay.
