= Minami-Iyo Station =

Railway station in Iyo, Ehime Prefecture, Japan

U02-1 Minami-Iyo Station 南伊予駅
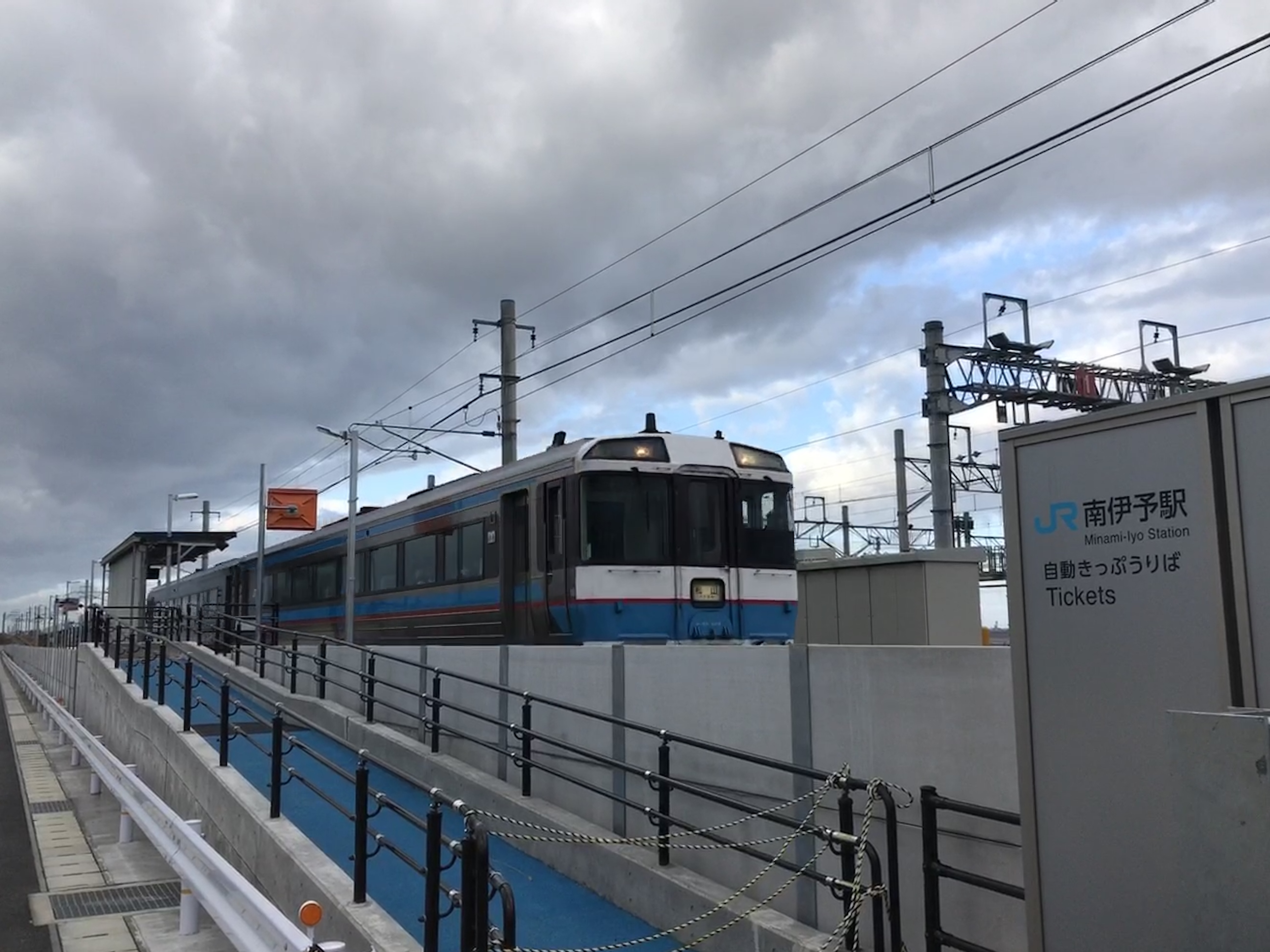
- A train stopped at Minami-Iyo Station before its opening (January 2020).

General information
- Location: Kamimitani, Iyo City, Ehime Prefecture 799-3104; Japan
- Coordinates: 33.777639°N 132.738611°E
- Operator: JR Shikoku
- Line: Yosan Line
- Distance: 201.9 km (125.5 mi) from Takamatsu
- Platforms: 1 side platform
- Tracks: 1

Construction
- Structure type: At grade

Other information
- Status: Unstaffed
- Station code: U02-1

History
- Opened: 14 March 2020; 6 years ago

Services
Preceding station	JR Shikoku	Following station
Iyo-Yokota U03 towards Uwajima	Yosan Line	Kita-Iyo U02 towards Takamatsu
Location
- Location within Ehime Prefecture Location within Japan

Minami-Iyo Station (南伊予駅, Minami-Iyo-eki) is a passenger railway station located in the city of Iyo, Ehime Prefecture, Japan. It is operated by JR Shikoku and has the station number "U02-1".

== Lines ==
Minami-Iyo Station is served by the JR Shikoku Yosan Line and is located 201.9 km from the beginning of the line at Takamatsu. Only Yosan Line local trains stop at the station bound for Matsuyama, Iyo-Ōzu and Uwajima.

== Layout ==
The station consists of a side platform serving a single track. The platform is equipped with a weather shelter and a "tickets corner", a small shelter housing an automatic ticket vending machine. A ramp leads up to the platform from the access road.

== History ==
On 26 November 2018, JR Shikoku announced the planned construction of the station, as part of a modernization project in the Matsuyama area. The station name comes from an old village that used to be in the area.

The station opened on 14 March 2020, at a cost of 170 million yen. A new Matsuyama Freight Terminal was also built next to the station.

== Surrounding area ==
- Japan Freight Railway (JR Freight) Matsuyama Freight Station
- Matsumae Town National Athletic Memorial Hockey Park
- Iyo City Iyo Junior High School
- Iyo Municipal Iyo Elementary School

== See also ==
- List of railway stations in Japan
