= Wasabi (film) =

2001 film

- French film poster
- Directed by: Gérard Krawczyk
- Written by: Luc Besson
- Produced by: Luc Besson
- Starring: Jean Reno; Ryōko Hirosue; Michel Muller; Carole Bouquet
- Cinematography: Gerard Stérin
- Edited by: Yann Hervé
- Music by: Éric Serra; Julien Schultheis
- Production companies: EuropaCorp; JVC; Samitose Productions; TF1 Films; Canal+
- Distributed by: EuropaCorp Distribution (France); JVC (Japan)
- Release date: 31 October 2001
- Running time: 94 minutes
- Countries: France; Japan
- Languages: French; Japanese
- Budget: $18 million
- Box office: $10.4 million

Wasabi is a 2001 action comedy film directed by Gérard Krawczyk and written and produced by Luc Besson. An international co-production of France and Japan, the film stars Jean Reno, Michel Muller and Ryōko Hirosue. In France, it was released as Wasabi, la petite moutarde qui monte au nez ("Wasabi, the little mustard that gets right up your nose").

The film gets its title from a scene where the protagonist, Hubert Fiorentini (Reno), eats a whole serving of wasabi at a Japanese restaurant without flinching.

== Plot ==
A drag queen, dancing provocatively to the enjoyment of other nightclub patrons, is abruptly hit in the face by Hubert Florentini (Reno), a commissaire of the French Police. Florentini drags her out of the club in handcuffs, assaulting other patrons who come too close to free her or attempt to hinder his exit. Unfortunately, one of these patrons includes the chief's son.

Florentini is chastised for the violent and unorthodox methods that he uses to accomplish his goals and is put on paid leave from the force. Despite his success and his seemingly enjoyable lifestyle of fighting crime, playing golf, and being the object of a beautiful woman's (Bouquet's) attentions, he has been unable to forget his one true love, Miko, a Japanese spy he met 19 years prior. Upon receiving news of her death, he is summoned to Japan by her lawyer, Ishibashi (Haruhiko Hirata) for the reading of her will.

Ishibashi informs Florentini that he has inherited the guardianship of Yumi (Hirosue), a fiery, adorable and eccentric Japanese/French teenage girl over whom he has custody until she reaches adulthood in two days (the age of adulthood in Japan being 20). Yumi, who was led to believe she was the result of her mother's rape and subsequent abandonment, hates her unknown father. Florentini realizes Yumi is his daughter, but does not tell her as she would probably flee from him.

Florentini uncovers evidence that Miko was the victim of foul play. He discovers that Miko had stolen a small fortune from the yakuza, a fortune now destined for Yumi upon reaching adulthood. Florentini summons the help of Momo (Michel Muller), a former intelligence colleague living in Tokyo. He helps Florentini with further investigations into Miko's death and in guarding Yumi from the yakuza by supplying him with two metal suitcases of weapons. The yakuza try to attack Yumi in an arcade, but Florentini, who has been observing their positions, kills all of them.

Later, Yumi discovers that Florentini is her father as she is captured by the yakuza. As they take her away and prepare to execute Florentini, he uses golf balls to knock out his would-be executioners and knock out the rest in mêlée combat. With the help of former intelligence colleagues, Florentini and Momo free Yumi from her kidnappers when they attempt to withdraw money from Yumi's bank account by replacing the bank's staff and customers with their own men. During the rescue attempt a gunfight breaks out and all of the yakuza are killed by Florentini single-handedly without any casualties to the good guys.

Following the ordeal, Florentini takes a flight back to France, having promised Yumi he would be back in a month. But just before the plane takes off, a group of customs officers enter the cabin with two familiar metal suitcases in hand, asking for their owner.

== Cast ==
- Jean Reno as Hubert Fiorentini
- Ryōko Hirosue as Yumi Yoshimido (Nihongo: 吉堂由美, Yoshi dō Yumi)
- Michel Muller as Maurice "Momo"
- Carole Bouquet as Sofia
- Ludovic Berthillot as Jean-Baptiste #1
- Yan Epstein as Jean-Baptiste #2
- Michel Scourneau as Van Eyck
- Christian Sinniger as Squale
- Jean-Marc Montalto as Olivier
- Alexandre Brik as Irène
- Fabio Zenoni as Josy
- Véronique Balme as Betty
- Jacques Bondoux as Del Rio
- Yoshi Oida as Takanawa (Nihongo: 高輪, Takanawa)
- Haruhiko Hirata as Ishibashi (Nihongo: 石橋, Ishibashi)
- Yuki Sakai as Miko
- Kinshiro Oyama as Japanese commissionaire
- KEE as Ryuichi
- Hiroko Maki as Atsuko Nakano
- Edilberto Ruiz as Guacamole

== Production ==
The film was shot in Tokyo, Japan.

== Reception ==
Wasabi was met with mixed reviews, with a 44% approval rating on Rotten Tomatoes based on 41 reviews. The website's critics consensus reads, "Jean Reno's efforts aren't enough to add dramatic ballast to Wasabi's bursts of kinetic – yet frustratingly hollow – action." Roger Ebert gave the film one-and-a-half out of four stars, commenting that "Reno does what he can in a thankless situation, the film ricochets from humor to violence and back again, and Ryoko Hirosue makes us wonder if she is always like that." On Metacritic, the film holds a score of 53 out of 100, based on reviews from 15 critics, indicating "mixed or average reviews".

Despite some exhibitor expectations, it only opened in second place at the French box office, behind American Pie 2, with a gross of 18.6 million Francs ($2.7 million) for the week. It reached number one in its second week with a gross of 9.4 million Francs. It grossed $6.7 million in France and $10.4 million worldwide.
