= Nakayama, Ehime =

Dissolved municipality in Ehime prefecture, Japan

Nakayama (中山町, Nakayama-chō) was a town located in Iyo District, Ehime Prefecture, Japan.

As of 2003, the town had an estimated population of 4,256 and a density of 56.43 persons per km^{2}. The total area was 75.42 km^{2}.

On April 1, 2005, Nakayama, along with the town of Futami (also from Iyo District), was merged into the expanded city of Iyo.
