= Fujioka (surname) =

Fujioka (written: 藤岡) is a Japanese surname. Notable people with the surname include:

- Takuya Fujioka (藤岡 琢也, born 1930), Japanese actor
- Jūkei Fujioka (藤岡 重慶, born 1933), Japanese actor
- Chihiro Fujioka (藤岡 千尋, born 1959), Japanese video game designer and composer
- Dean Fujioka (born 1980), Japanese musician and actor
- Hiroshi Fujioka (藤岡 弘, born 1946), Japanese actor
- John Fujioka (1925–2018), American actor
- Manami Fujioka (藤岡 麻菜美, born 1994), Japanese women's basketball player
- Nobukatsu Fujioka (藤岡 信勝, born 1943), Japanese professor of education at Tokyo University
- Shuhei Fujioka (potter) (藤岡 周平, born 1947), Japanese potter
- Takahiro Fujioka (藤岡 貴裕, born 1989), Japanese baseball player
- William T. Fujioka (born 1953), American county executive
- Yoshiaki Fujioka (藤岡 好明, born 1985), Japanese baseball player
- Yudai Fujioka (藤岡 裕大, born 1993), Japanese baseball player

== Fictional characters ==
- Fujioka (Minami-ke) (藤岡), a character in the manga series Minami-ke
- Haruhi Fujioka (藤岡 ハルヒ), a character in the manga series Ouran High School Host Club
