= All About My Dog =

- Film poster
- Directed by: Isshin Inudo; Hideki Kuroda; Yoshio Kuroda; Satoshi Nagai; Shinsuke Sato; Tetsuhisa Yazu; Atsushi Sanada
- Written by: Akira Nagai; Shinsuke Sato; Keita Yamada
- Produced by: Takashige Ichise
- Starring: Shido Nakamura; Yūki Amami; Misaki Ito; Aoi Miyazaki
- Music by: S.E.N.S.; Satoru Shionoya; coba
- Production companies: Aozora Investments; Dentsu; Geneon Entertainment; IMJ Entertainment; Kadokawa Shoten; Oz Company; Nikkatsu; Entertainment Farm
- Distributed by: Xanadeux
- Release date: 19 March 2005 (Japan)
- Running time: 96 minutes
- Country: Japan
- Language: Japanese

All About My Dog (Japanese: いぬのえいが, Hepburn: Inu no Eiga) is a 2005 Japanese anthology drama film consisting of interwoven shorts about dogs. The film's various short stories are directed by Isshin Inudo, Hideki Kuroda, Yoshio Kuroda, Satoshi Nagai, Shinsuke Sato, Tetsuhisa Yazu and Atsushi Sanada. The "Marimo" section, directed by Sanada, is particularly popular in Internet memes.

The film was followed by a sequel titled Happy Together: All About My Dog in 2011.

== Cast ==
- Shido Nakamura as Kentarō Yamada
- Yūki Amami as Miharu
- YosiYosi Arakawa as Koro's voice
- Noriko Eguchi
- Randy Goins as an Interviewer
- Misaki Ito as Misaki Shiratori
- Jiei Kabira as Masao
- Tae Kimura as Kaori's Mother
- Soichiro Kitamura as Yamamura
- Manami Konishi as Kaori
- Aoi Miyazaki as Mika
- Nozomi Ōhashi
- Otoha as Tomomi
- Shiro Sano
- Ryuta Sato as Katsuhiko
- Katsumi Takahashi
- Yoji Tanaka as Kentarō Maruyama
- Eriko Watanabe
- Hinano Yoshikawa
