= Mujaki na Kankei =

- 無邪気な関係
- Country of origin: Japan
- Original language: Japanese
- No. of seasons: 1
- No. of episodes: 13

Original release
- Network: TBS

Mujaki na Kankei (無邪気な関係) is a 1984 Japanese television drama series.

== Cast ==
- Shingo Tsurumi
- Mari Ishihara
- Kei Satō
- Shigeru Muroi
