= Kushi Station =

Railway station in Iyo, Ehime Prefecture, Japan

S10 Kushi Station 串駅
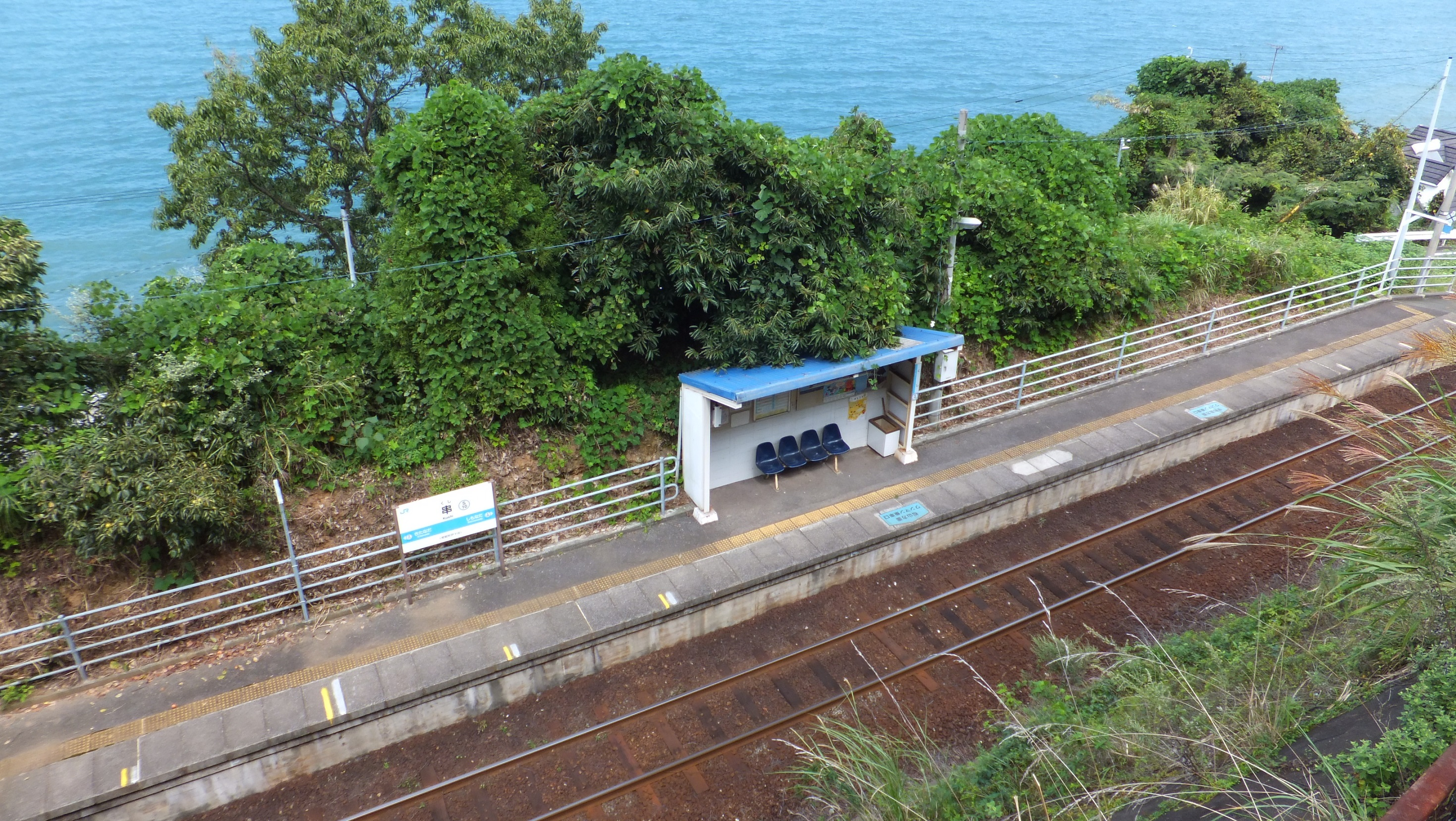
- Kushi Station in 2015

General information
- Location: Futamichokushi, Iyo City, Ehime Prefecture 799-3312; Japan
- Coordinates: 33°38′50″N 132°33′46″E
- Operator: JR Shikoku
- Line: Yosan Line
- Distance: 225.0 km (139.8 mi) from Takamatsu
- Platforms: 1 side platform
- Tracks: 1

Construction
- Structure type: At grade (sidehill cut)
- Cycle facilities: Bike shed
- Accessible: No - steep slope leads up to platform

Other information
- Status: Unstaffed
- Station code: S10

History
- Opened: 1 February 1963; 63 years ago

Passengers
- FY2019: 10

Services
Preceding station	JR Shikoku	Following station
Kitanada S11 towards Uwajima	Yosan Line via Iyo-Nagahama	Shimonada S09 towards Takamatsu
Location
- Location within Ehime Prefecture Location within Japan

Kushi Station (串駅, Kushi-eki) is a passenger railway station located in the city of Iyo, Ehime Prefecture, Japan. It is operated by JR Shikoku and has the station number "S10".

== Lines ==
The station is on the older, original branch of the Yosan Line which runs along the coast and is located 225.0 km from the beginning of the line at Takamatsu. Only local trains stop at the station and the eastbound trains terminate at Matsuyama. Connections with other services are needed to travel further east of Matsuyama on the line.

== Layout ==
Kushi Station consists of a side platform serving a single track on a sidehill cut. There is no station building, only a simple shelter for waiting passengers. A steep access road leads up to the platform from the main road. A bike shed is provided at the base of the access road.

== History ==
Japanese National Railways (JNR) opened the station as an added stop on the existing Yosan Line on 1 October 1964. With the privatization of JNR on 1 April 1987, control of the station passed to JR Shikoku.

== Surrounding area ==
- Japan National Route 378

== See also ==
- List of railway stations in Japan
