= Zatoichi and the Chess Expert =

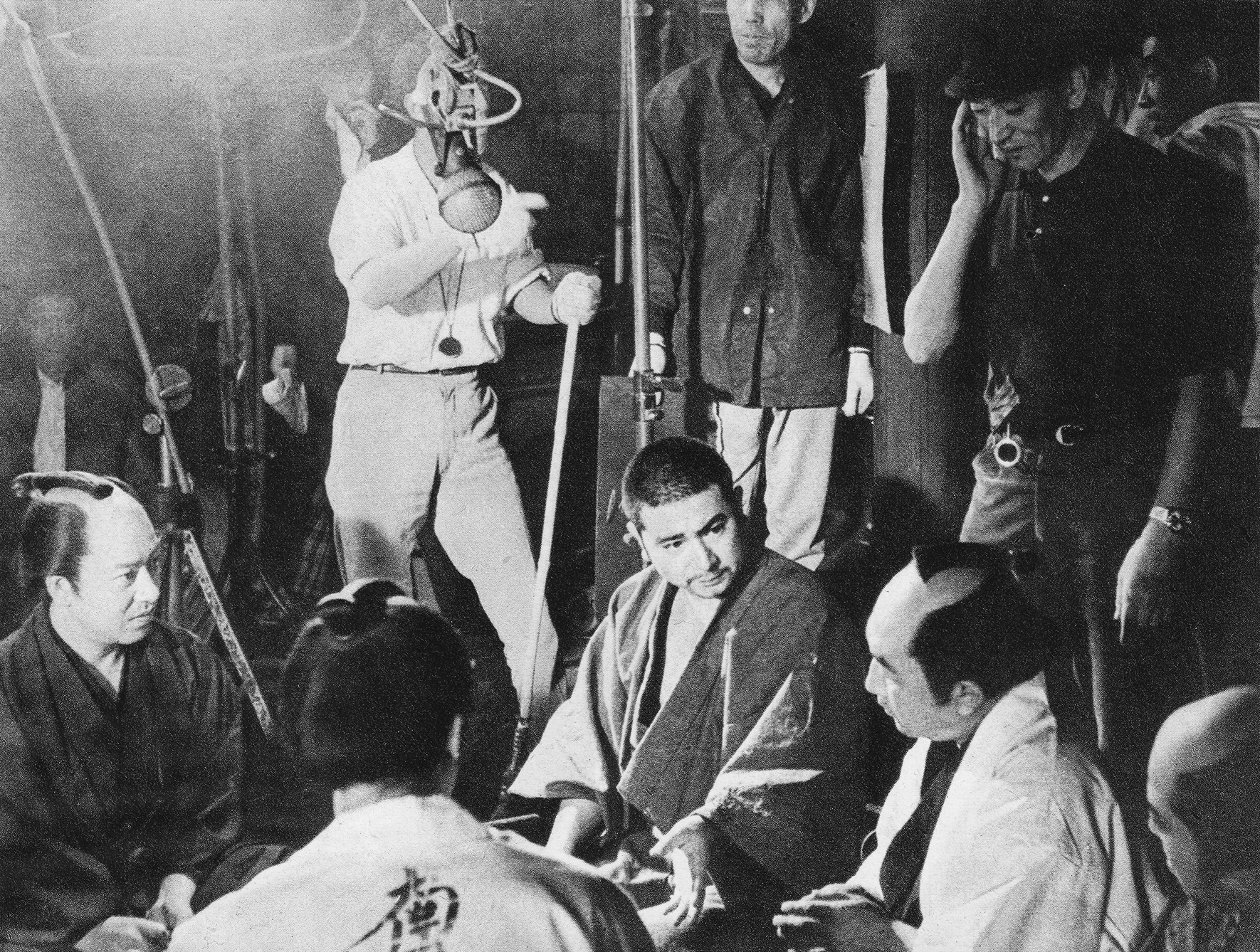
- The filming site of the movie "Zatoichi and the Chess Expert".Shintaro Katsu is under the screen center and the person in the upper right of the screen is the director Kenji Misumi.

Japanese name
- Kanji: 座頭市地獄旅
Transcriptions
- Revised Hepburn: Zatōichi jigoku-tabi
- Directed by: Kenji Misumi
- Written by: Daisuke Ito
- Based on: Zatoichi by Kan Shimozawa
- Produced by: Hisashi Okuda
- Starring: Shintaro Katsu; Mikio Narita
- Cinematography: Chikashi Makiura
- Edited by: Kanji Suganuma
- Music by: Akira Ifukube
- Production company: Daiei Studios
- Release dates: 24 December 1965 (Japan); 4 October 1968 (New York)
- Running time: 87 minutes
- Country: Japan
- Language: Japanese

Zatoichi and the Chess Expert (座頭市地獄旅, Zatōichi jigoku-tabi) is a 1965 Japanese chambara film directed by Kenji Misumi and starring Shintaro Katsu as the blind masseur Zatoichi. It was originally released by the Daiei Motion Picture Company (later acquired by Kadokawa Pictures).

Zatoichi and the Chess Expert is the twelfth episode in the 26-part film series devoted to the character of Zatoichi. It has also been known as Showdown for Zatoichi and Zatoichi's Trip to Hell.

== Plot ==
On a boat trip to Honshu island, Zatoichi (Katsu) makes the acquaintance of Jumonji (Narita), an expert shogi (Japanese chess) player and swordsman. Once on Honshu, a group of men that had tried to cheat Zatoichi at dice try to take revenge upon him- only for Ichi to turn the tables on them in the tussle. However, Miki, the niece of a woman named Otane, is injured in the confusion, compelling Ichi to go to great lengths to procure the medicine needed to cure her injury. When she recovers, the child sincerely thanks him, leaving him overwrought with emotion.

The four travel to Hakone to use hotsprings to help in healing Miki. After arriving, further guests arrive- including a young lord named Sasagara, his sister Kume, and their retainer Roppei, the only one who could identify the man who killed their father, over a heated game of shogi. When Otane admits to her growing feelings for Ichi, he reveals that he still harbors feelings for a woman of the same name that he once loved, who is now dead. Despite his suspicions, Zatoichi remains silent, until Roppei is found dead- having been strangled with a length of wire while engaged in prayer. This, combined with the discovery of a fishing float at the scene of the killing, further implicates Jumonji. However, Ichi continues to "observe" Jumonji through their shogi games, with the latter having won two of their three games. When The brother and sister reveal a particular quirk of the man who killed their father- rubbing his nose and snapping his finger- Ichi is all but certain of his new friend's guilt in the two murders.

As Zatoichi and Jumonji escort Otane and Miki on their trip, the two men begin a verbal game of shogi, with each move escalating the tension between the two of them. Eventually, the moment of "checkmate" comes- when Jumonji confronts Ichi, only for Zatoichi to reveal the fishing float from the scene of the murder. The two engage in a duel- with Zatoichi telling Otane to get Miki away from the carnage- and Ichi critically wounds Jumonji. Though he stops from killing the man, when Sasagara and Kume arrive to enact vengeance upon him. In the confusion, Zatoichi departs- with Sasagara and Kume bowing respectfully to him, and Miki calling out to thank him.

As he walks away, upon hearing Miki, Zatoichi softly returns her earlier thanks- saying "arigato".

== Cast ==
- Shintaro Katsu as Zatoichi
- Mikio Narita as Jumonji
- Chizuru Hayashi as Kume
- Kaneko Iwasaki as Otane
- Gaku Yamamoto as Sagawa
- Tatsuo Endo as yakuza boss
- Takuya Fujioka as Sunpachi
- Taro Marui as Roppei
- Rokko Toura as crippled yakuza

== Reception ==
From contemporary reviews, Howard Thompson of The New York Times wrote that the film "has considerably more juice than its predecessor", adding that "[t]he settings, especially the natural panoramas, and the costumes are fetching in quite lovely color. Mr. Katsu performs, as before, with beguiling, wily simplicity. There is an excellent, sinuous performance by Mikio Narita as an expert shogi player and no mean swordsman himself. Chizu Hayashi is a pretty, earnest heroine and little Gaku Yamamoto, as her chirpy daughter, is cute." Thompson also said "[t]he movie is a Western in being unabashedly melodramatic with most of the cards stacked, clipping along in a straight line through some pictorial backgrounds and with virtue triumphant." "Beau." of Variety stated that the film "has enough bloodletting for the kids and enough saccharine romantics (Zatoichi is courted by the teary-eyed wife of one of his conquests) for the ladies. But without art for addicts of Akira Kurosawa and with those shivering subtitles for the mass audience, it has no commercial future in this country."
