= Gift (1997 Japanese TV series) =

- promotional poster of Gift
- Starring: Takuya Kimura (木村拓哉); Shigeru Muroi (室井滋)
- Country of origin: Japan
- No. of episodes: 11

Production
- Running time: 52 min. each episode

Original release
- Network: Fuji TV
- Release: 16 April – 25 June 1997

Gift (ギフト, Gifuto) is a drama that aired on Fuji TV. It first aired in Japan from April 16, 1997 to June 25, 1997 every Wednesday. It features music by Bryan Ferry (main theme song) and Howard Jones (ending theme song). It raised several issues in Japanese society, due to its casual use of a butterfly knife and its resulting violence.

== Cast ==
- Takuya Kimura as Hayasaka Yukio/Mizoguchi Takehiro
- Shigeru Muroi as Koshigoe Naomi
- Mitsuko Baisho as Inspector Sakuhara
- Masayuki Imai as Norasanei
- Satomi Kobayashi as Hoshikawa Juliet
- Ryoko Shinohara as Akiyama Chiaki
- Kaori Momoi as Dr. Ika
- Tsuyoshi Kusanagi as cameo (ep 7)
