= Futami, Ehime =

Dissolved municipality in Ehime prefecture, Japan

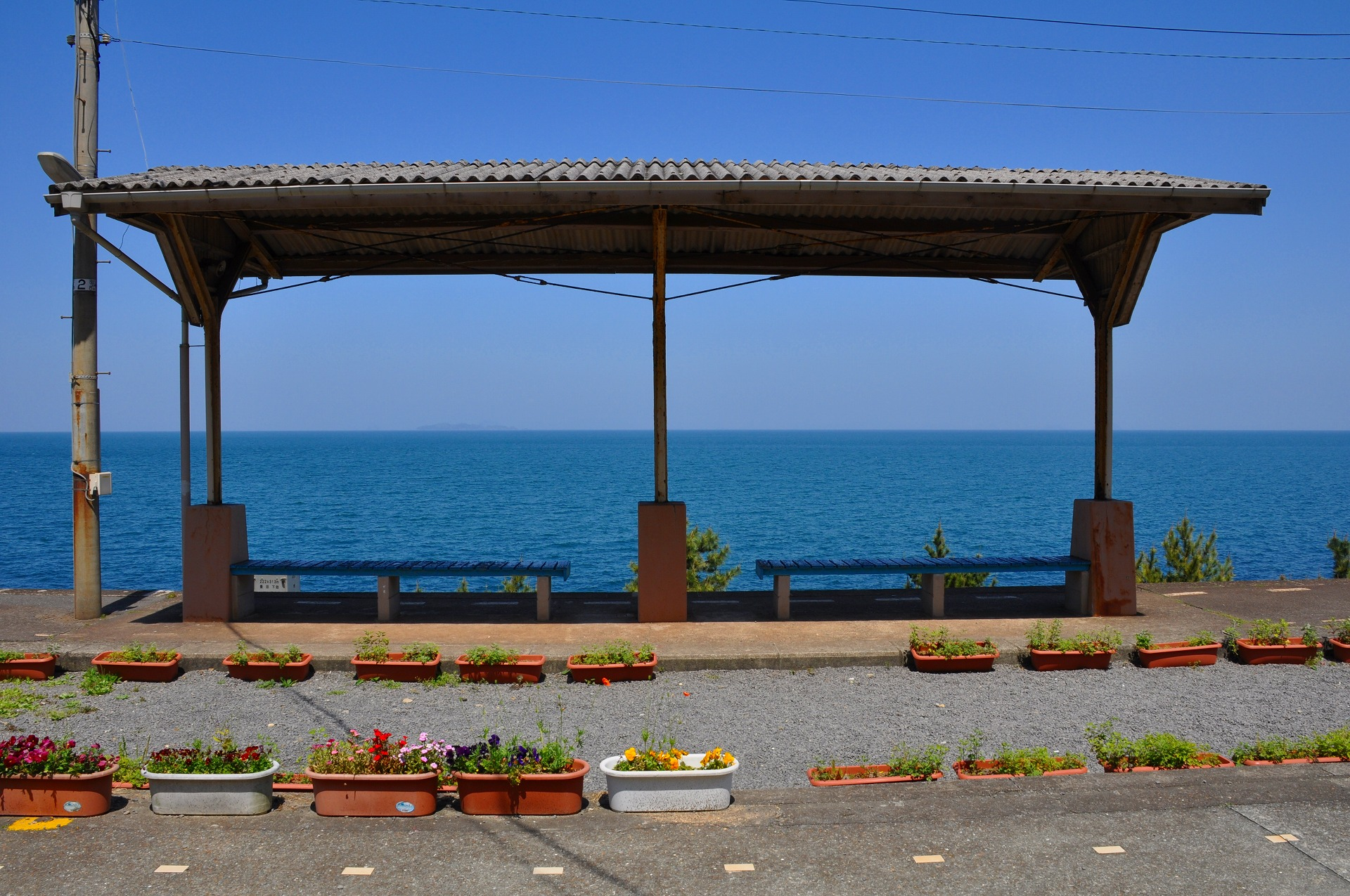
Shimonada station in Futami

Futami (Japanese: 双海町, Hepburn: Futami-chō) was a town located in Iyo District, Ehime Prefecture, Japan.

As of 2003, the town had an estimated population of 5,202 and a density of 83.67 persons per km^{2}. The total area was 62.17 km^{2}.

On April 1, 2005, Futami, along with the town of Nakayama (also from Iyo District), was merged into the expanded city of Iyo.
