= All Around Us =

- Original Japanese poster.
- Directed by: Ryōsuke Hashiguchi
- Written by: Ryōsuke Hashiguchi
- Produced by: Eiji Watanabe; Seigo Fukada
- Starring: Lily Franky; Tae Kimura
- Cinematography: Shogo Ueno
- Edited by: Ryōsuke Hashiguchi
- Music by: Akeboshi
- Production companies: SIGLO; Bitters End; Amuse Soft Entertainment; Eisei Gekijo; Hakuhodo DY Media Partners
- Release date: June 7, 2008 (Japan)
- Running time: 140 minutes
- Country: Japan
- Language: Japanese

All Around Us (Japanese: ぐるりのこと。, Hepburn: Gururi no koto) is a 2008 Japanese drama film directed by Ryōsuke Hashiguchi and starring Lily Franky and Tae Kimura.

== Cast ==
- Lily Franky
- Tae Kimura
- Mitsuko Baisho
- Susumu Terajima
- Tamae Ando
- Minori Terada
- Akira Emoto
- Norito Yashima
- Seiichi Tanabe
- Ryo Kase
- Reiko Kataoka
- Hirofumi Arai

== Reception ==
Todd Brown of Twitch Film called All Around Us "[a]t once sweepingly panoramic and microscopically intimate", adding that "Hashiguchi's fourth feature parallels the pains and struggles of the married couple at its center with the changes in Japan itself, touching on such major events as the 1990s economic collapse, the 1995 Tokyo subway sarin gas attacks, and others."

== Awards and nominations ==
51st Blue Ribbon Awards

- Won: Best Actress - Tae Kimura
- Won: Best New Talent - Lily Franky

33rd Hochi Film Award

- Won: Best Director - Ryōsuke Hashiguchi

32nd Japan Academy Prize: Best Actress (Tae Kimura)
