= Shiranui-ryū =

Traditional school of Japanese martial arts

Shiranui-ryū (不知火流) is a traditional school of Japanese martial arts. It was created by Kawakami Gensai in the 1860s, following his study of swordsmanship under the instructor Todoroki Buhē. Shiranui-ryū was characterized by high speed. Kawakami Gensai was its only practitioner as he was executed in 1872.

== Fictional Portrayal ==
In the manga and anime Rurouni Kenshin, the sword style of Himura Kenshin (himself loosely based on Kawakami Gensai), the Hiten Mitsurugi-ryū (飛天御剣流, lit. "Flying Heaven's Honorable Sword Style") is loosely based on Shiranui-ryū; both styles are characterized by high-speed attacks.
