= Shimonada Station =

Railway station in Iyo, Ehime Prefecture, Japan

S09 Shimonada Station 下灘駅
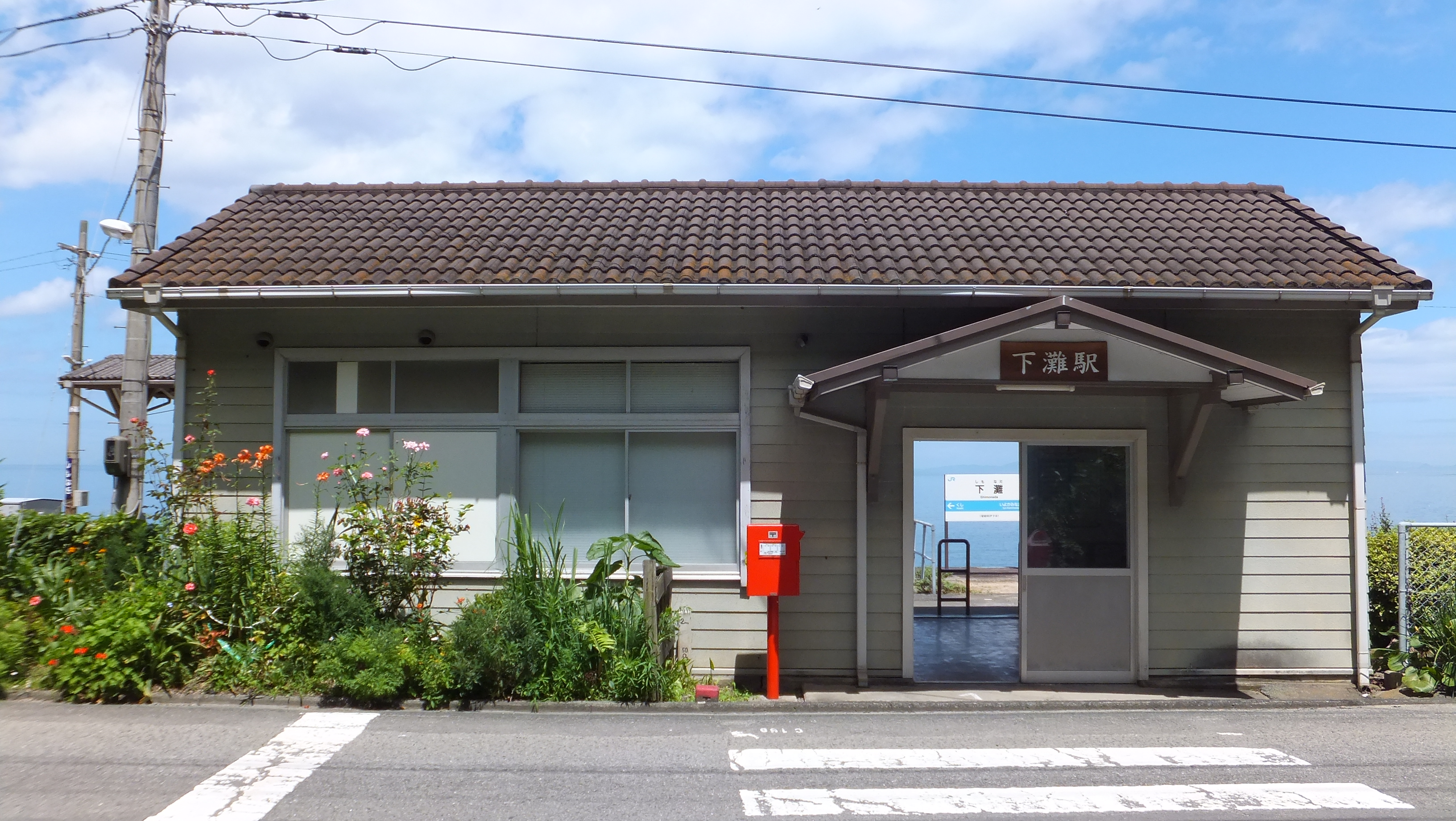
- Shimonada Station in 2015

General information
- Location: Ohkubo, Futamicho, Iyo City, Ehime Prefecture 799-3312; Japan
- Coordinates: 33°39′18″N 132°35′21″E
- Operator: JR Shikoku
- Line: Yosan Line
- Distance: 222.4 km (138.2 mi) from Takamatsu
- Platforms: 1 side platform
- Tracks: 1

Construction
- Structure type: At grade
- Accessible: Yes - ramp to platform

Other information
- Status: Unstaffed
- Station code: S09

History
- Opened: 9 June 1935; 91 years ago

Passengers
- FY2019: 78

Services
Preceding station	JR Shikoku	Following station
Kushi S10 towards Uwajima	Yosan Line via Iyo-Nagahama	Iyo-Kaminada S08 towards Takamatsu
Location
- Location within Ehime Prefecture Location within Japan

Shimonada Station (下灘駅, Shimonada-eki) is a passenger railway station located in the city of Iyo, Ehime Prefecture, Japan. It is operated by JR Shikoku and has the station number "S09".

The station has been featured on the Seishun 18 Ticket promotional poster 3 times, making it very popular with photographers and tourists.

== Lines ==
Shimonada Station is served by the JR Shikoku Yosan Line and is 222.4 km from the beginning of the line at Takamatsu. It is located on the older, original branch of the line which runs along the coast of the Seto Inland Sea. As most limited express services use the newer and shorter Uchiko branch from Mukaibara to Iyo-Ōzu , Shimonada is mainly served by local trains. The eastbound local services end at Matsuyama. Connections with other services are needed to travel further east of Matsuyama on the line. The tourist train Iyonada Monogatari runs on the coastal branch and makes a stop at Shimonada to allow passengers to take in and photograph the scenic views. One train times its arrival at sunset to catch the view of setting sun over the Seto Inland Sea. However passengers do not leave the train at this station and no new passengers are taken on.

== Layout ==
The station consists of a side platform serving a single track. An unstaffed station building serves as a waiting room. A ramp leads to the platform where a shelter is provided. There are traces of a track bed on the other side of the platform, indicating that it was once an island serving two tracks.

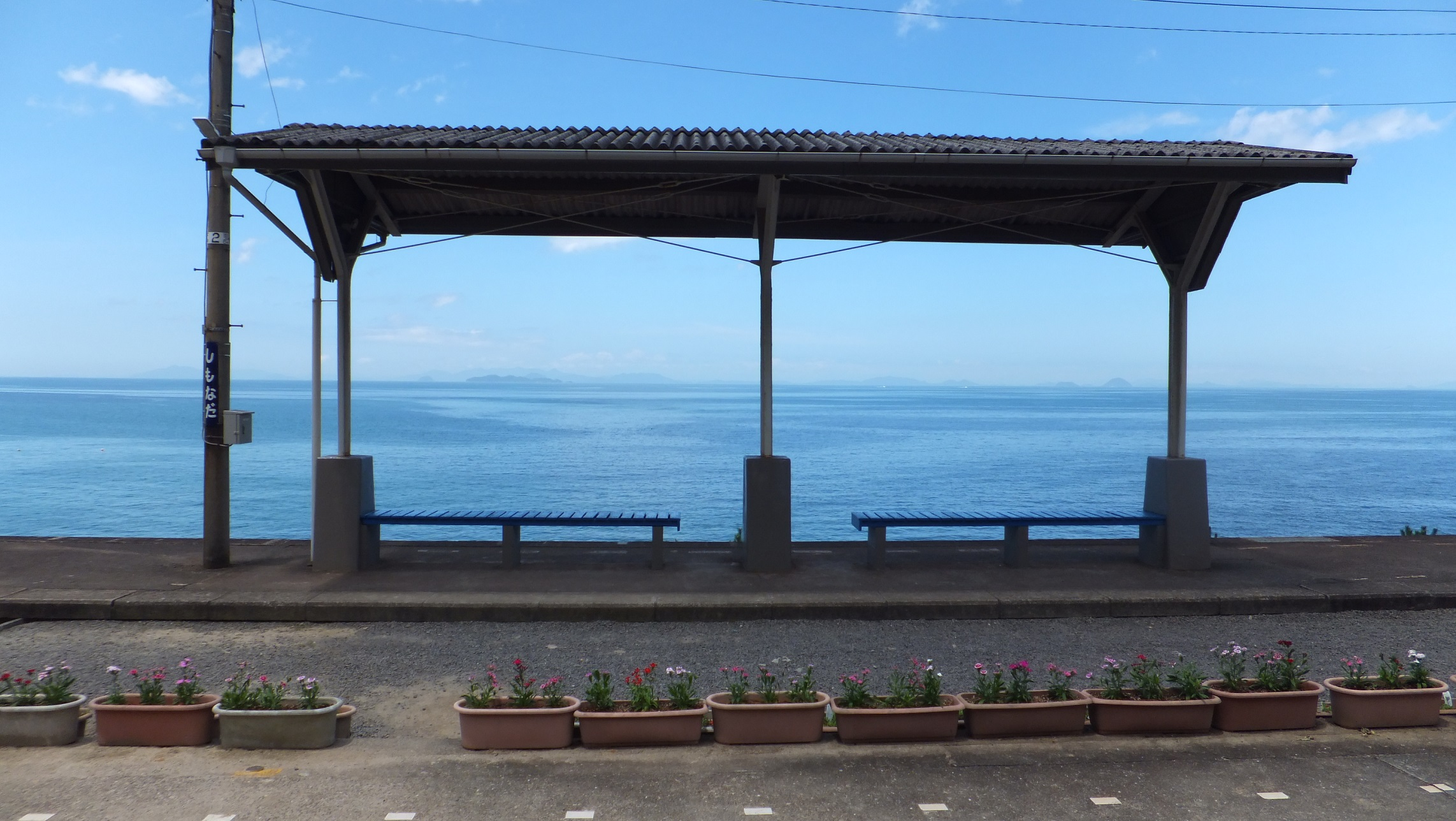
A scene commonly featured in travel magazines: the platform, with its shelter, with its unobstructed view of the Seto Inland Sea.

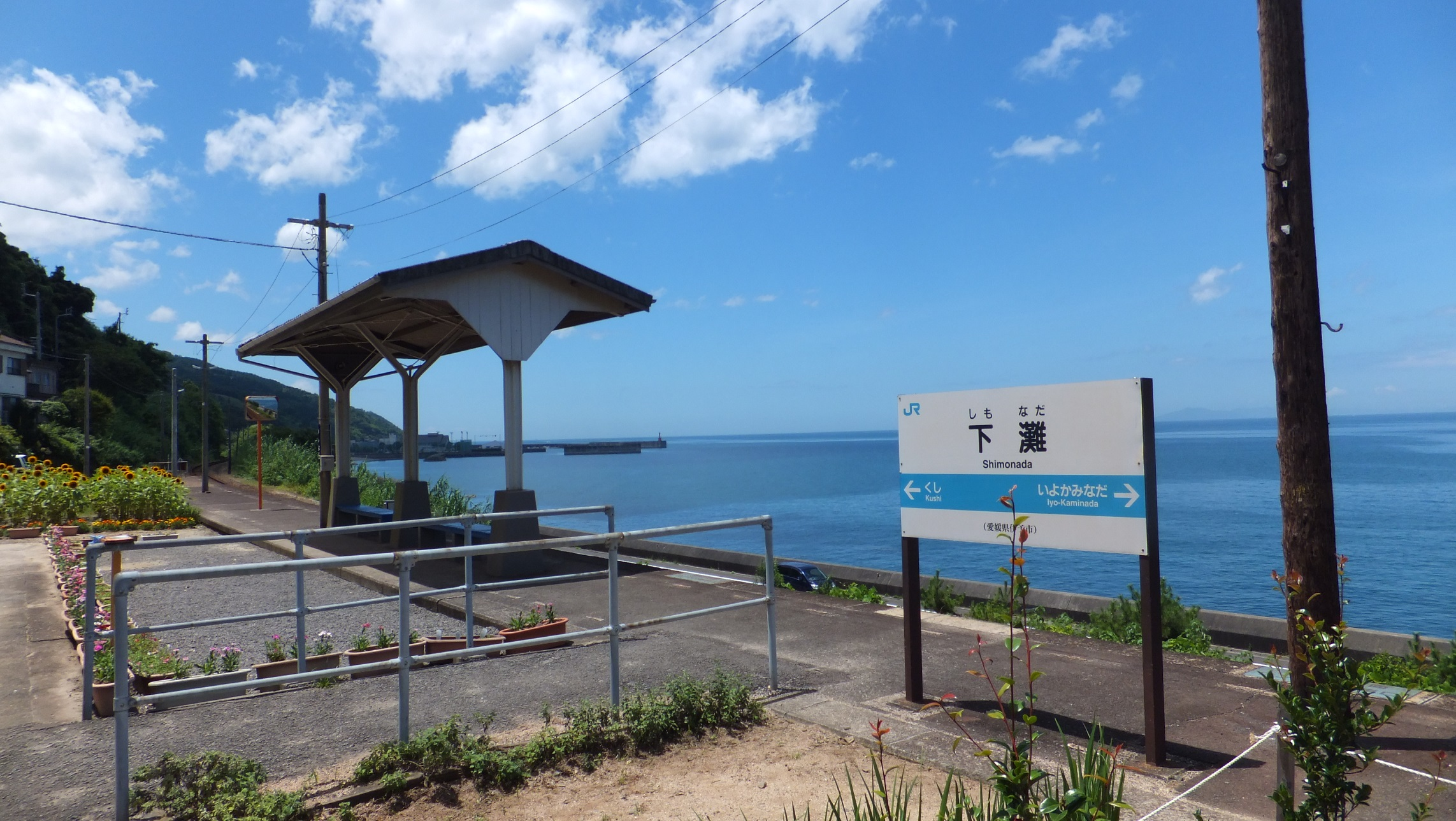
The ramp from the waiting room to the platform.

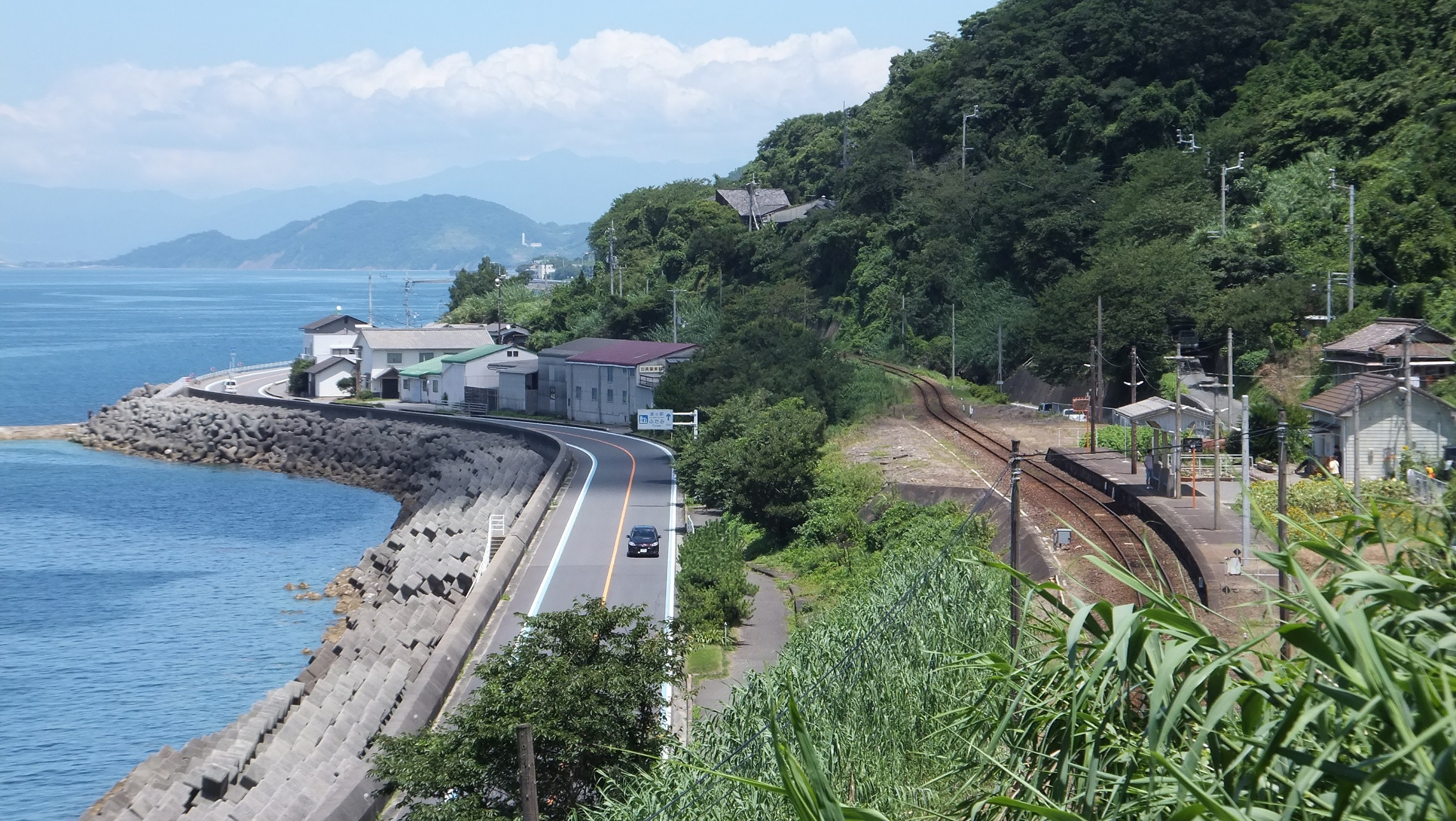
Shimonada from a high vantage point. Note the kink in the track, indicating that there were once two tracks serving the station.

== History ==
Shimonada Station was opened on 9 June 1935 as the terminus of the then Yosan Main Line which had been extended westwards from Iyo-Kaminada. It became a through-station just a few months later on 6 October 1935 when the line was extended to Iyo-Nagahama. At that time the station was operated by Japanese Government Railways (JGR), later becoming Japanese National Railways (JNR). With the privatization of JNR on 1 April 1987, control of the station passed to JR Shikoku.

== Surrounding area ==
- Iyo City Hall Shimonada Branch
- Iyo Municipal Shimonada Elementary School

== See also ==
- List of railway stations in Japan
