= Ryōsuke Hashiguchi =

Japanese film director (born 1962)

- Born: Nagasaki, Japan
- Occupation: Film director

Ryōsuke Hashiguchi (橋口亮輔, Hashiguchi Ryōsuke; born 13 July 1962) is a Japanese film director particularly known for projects concerning LGBT community issues. He won the award for Best Director at the 24th Yokohama Film Festival for Hush! and at the 33rd Hochi Film Award for All Around Us.

== Filmography ==
Year	English title	Original title	Notes
1981	Fa	ファ Fa	director; short film, 4 minutes
1985	Whistling...1985	ヒュルル…1985 Hyururu...1985	director; writer; actor; producer
1989	A Secret Evening	夕辺の秘密 Yūbe no himitsu	director; writer; actor 1994 Tokyo International Lesbian & Gay Film Festival title: Secret in the Evening
1993	A Touch of Fever	二十才の微熱 Hatachi no binetsu	director; writer
1995	Like Grains of Sand	渚のシンドバッド Nagisa no Shindobaddo	director; writer; actor
2001	Hush!	ハッシュ!	director; writer
2008	All Around Us	ぐるりのこと。 Gururi no koto	director; writer
2013	Zentai	ゼンタイ Zentai	director; writer
2013	Sunrise Sunset	サンライズ・サンセット Sanraizu sansetto	director; writer
2015	Three Stories of Love	恋人たち Koibito-tachi	director; writer
2024	With Mother	お母さんが一緒 Okaasan ga Issho	director; writer
