= Fukuishi Kannon =

Buddhist temple in Sasebo, Nagasaki, Japan

Coordinates: 33.1606°N 129.7340°E

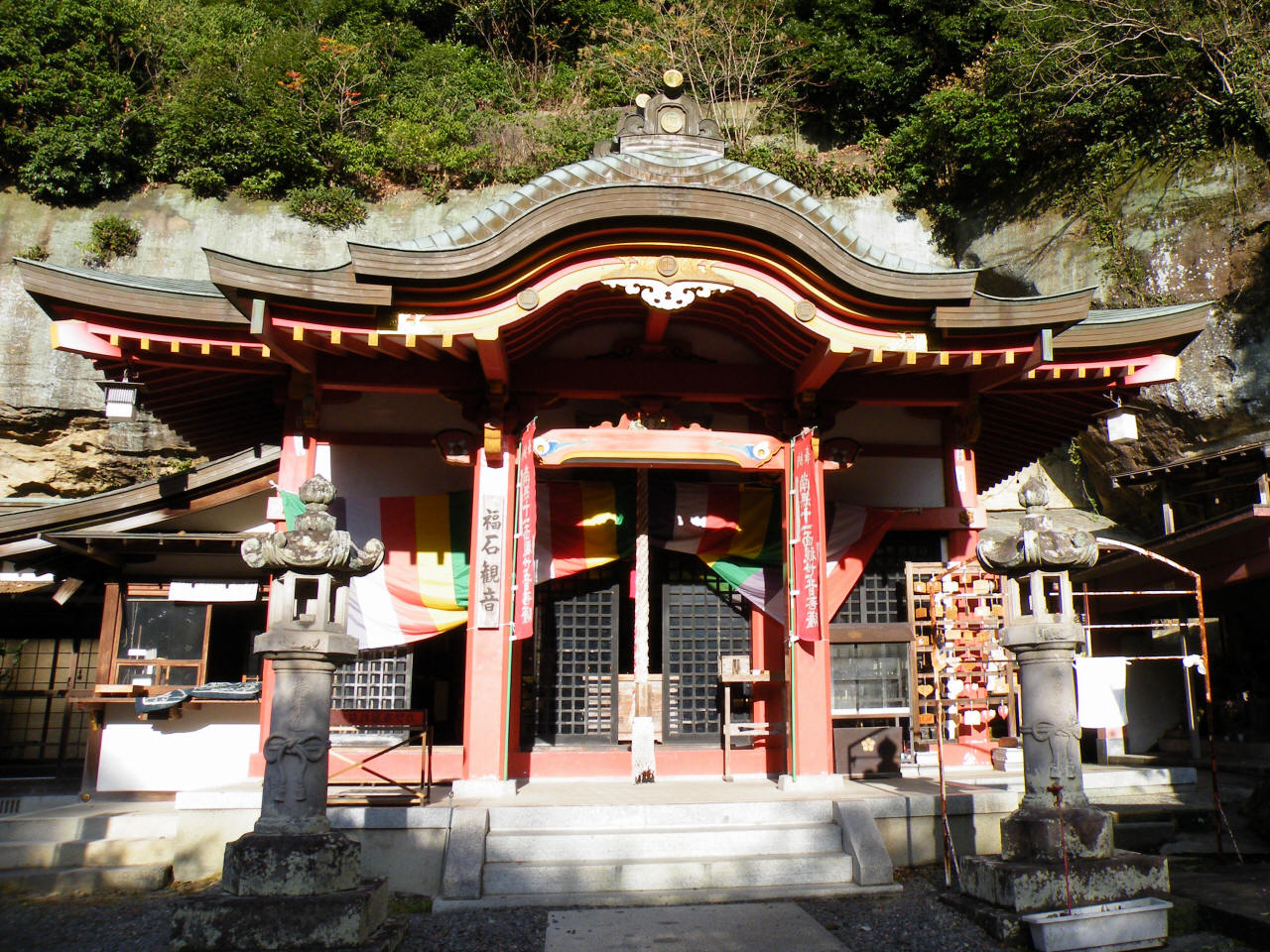
Main Hall

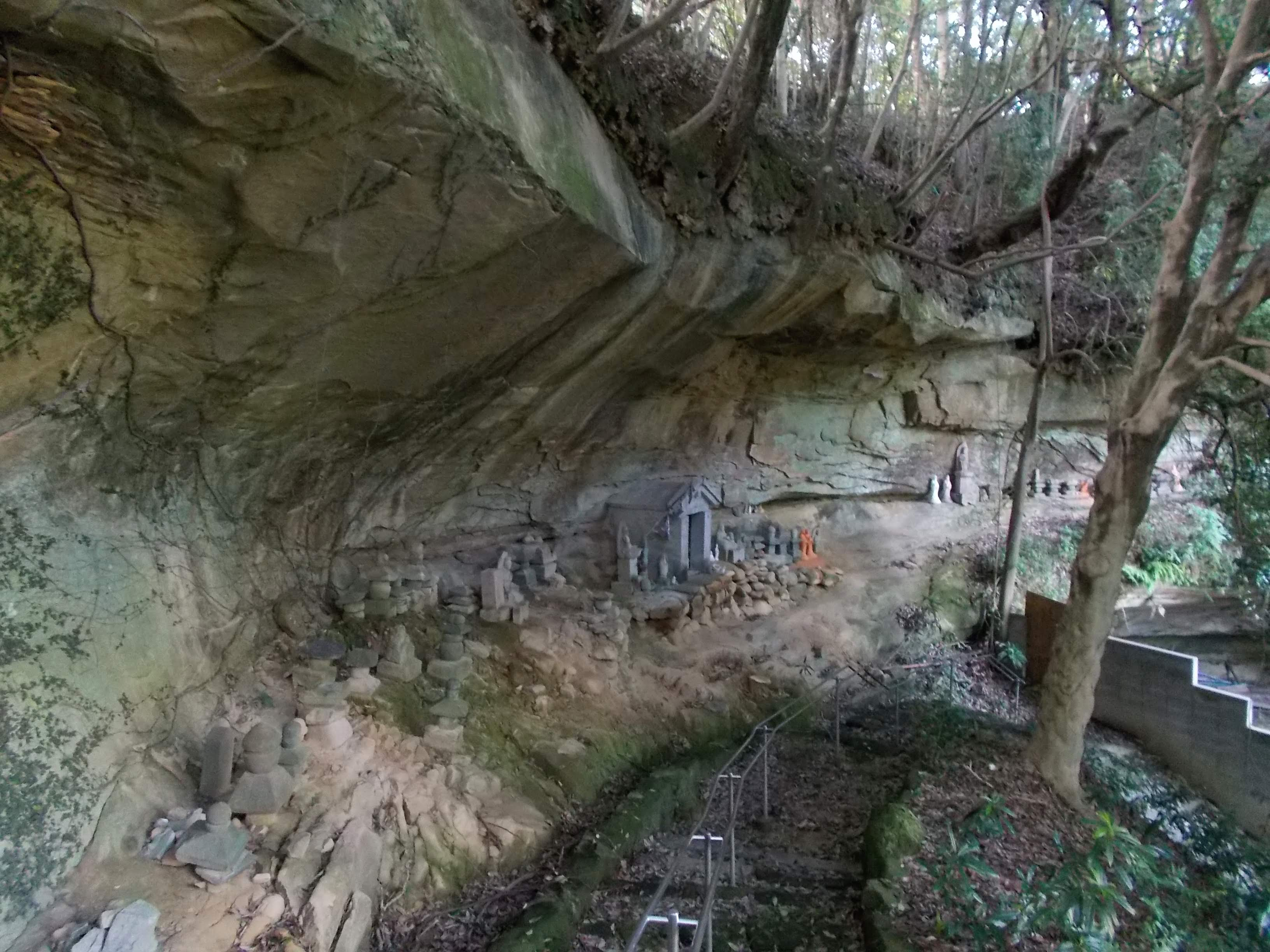
The 500 Rakan Cave

Fukuishi Kannon (福石観音) is a Buddhist temple of the Shingon-shū Chizan-ha in Sasebo, Nagasaki, Japan. Its honorary sangō prefix is Fukuishisan (福石山).

== History ==
The official name is Seigan-ji, but it is popularly known as Fukuishi Kannon. The temple was founded in the early 8th century. The present main hall was built in 1785 by Matsuura Seizan, the feudal lord of Hirado Domain who donated land to kannon temple there.

== The Eleven-faced Kannon ==
The Statue of the Eleven Faced Kannon (or the Goddess of Mercy) is 2 meters (6 ft 7 in) tall and it is said that it was carved by a priest known as Gyōki. It is one of the seven famous kannon statues on Kyushu.

== The 500 Rakan Cave ==
The cave of mount Fukuishi is a huge cave of sandstone made by erosion of water with a mouth of approximately 60 centimeters and height of 4 meters (13 ft). According to the temple story, in the early 9th century, Kūkai, a monk who was beloved Gyōki, died on February 2, 749. He enshrined 500 arhat statues in the cave. Many rakan statues disappeared in the long history after that, Matsuura Seizan of the 9th lord who helped rebuild the temple in 1788. Many of them were dissipated after the World War II and now only 142 bodies have been left.

== The Fukuishi Kannon Sennichi Festival ==
The Fukuishi Kannon Sennichi Festival is held between August 8 and 11 every year. There is the public exhibition of religious objects from this temple, usually relics or statuary, that are normally not on display.
