= Zero Focus (2009 film) =

- Theatrical release poster
- Directed by: Isshin Inudō
- Written by: Kenji Nakazono; Isshin Inudo
- Starring: Ryōko Hirosue; Miki Nakatani; Tae Kimura; Hidetoshi Nishijima; Takeshi Kaga
- Cinematography: Takahiro Tsutai
- Edited by: Soichi Ueno
- Music by: Kōji Ueno
- Distributed by: Toho
- Release date: November 14, 2009 (Japan)
- Running time: 131 minutes
- Country: Japan
- Language: Japanese

Zero Focus (Japanese: ゼロの焦点, Hepburn: Zero no Shōten) is a 2009 Japanese film directed by Isshin Inudō. It was nominated for Best Film at the 33rd Japan Academy Prize. It is a remake of the 1961 film of the same name, itself based on a novel by Seichō Matsumoto.

== Cast ==
- Ryōko Hirosue as Sadako Ubara
- Miki Nakatani as Sachiko Murota
- Tae Kimura as Hisako Tanuma
- Hidetoshi Nishijima as Kenichi Ubara
- Takeshi Kaga as Gisaku Murota
- Tetta Sugimoto as Sotaro Ubara
- Hiromi Sakimoto as Toru Narumi
- Toru Nomaguchi as Yoshio Honda
- Fukumi Kuroda as Yasuko Jojo
- Hirotarō Honda as Aoki
- Yoshie Ichige as Kinue Itane

== Awards and nominations ==
33rd Japan Academy Prize.

- Nominated: Best Film
- Nominated: Best Director - Isshin Inudō
- Nominated: Best Actress - Ryōko Hirosue
