= Takuya Fujioka =

Japanese actor (1930–2006)

- Born: 4 September 1930; Himeji, Hyōgo Prefecture, Japan
- Died: 20 October 2006 (aged 76)
- Occupation: Actor
- Years active: 1959–2006

Takuya Fujioka (藤岡琢也, Fujioka Takuya; 4 September 1930 – 20 October 2006) was a Japanese actor. He is most famous for playing the role of Daikichi Okakura on the television drama series Wataru Seken wa Oni Bakari.

Fujioka attended Kwansei Gakuin University but dropped out because of illness. His first starring role in the film was in the Gambare Nihondanji.

He died of chronic kidney disease on 20 October 2006 at the age of 76. His final film appearance was in The Blooming Again, released in 2004.

== Filmography ==
=== Films ===
- Zatoichi and the Chess Expert (1965) as Sunpachi
- Gamera vs. Barugon (1966) as Doctor.Satō
- Yakuza (893) gurentai (1966)
- Zatoichi the Outlaw (1967) as Zatō Sanji
- Freshman Wakadaishō (1969) as Fujiwara
- Kaoyaku (1971) as Kurihara
- New Battles Without Honor and Humanity: Last Days of the Boss (1974) as Yonemoto
- The Gate of Youth (1975) as Coal mine owner
- Yakuza Graveyard (1976) as Sugi
- Mount Hakkoda (1977) as Monma
- Yatsuhakamura (1977) as Doctor.Hisano
- The Fall of Ako Castle (1978) as Ōno Kurobei
- Moonlight Mask (1981) as Detective Matsuda
- Imperial Navy (1981) as Shigeru Fukudome
- The Highest Honor (1982) as Matsumoto
- Tora-san's Song of Love (1983) as Kitamura
- Urusei Yatsura 2: Beautiful Dreamer (1984) as Mujyaki (voice)
- Ruten no umi (1990) as Chigusa
- Blooming Again (2004) as Kinzo Genda

=== Television drama ===
- Akō Rōshi (1964) as Sezaemon Oishi
- Momotarō-zamurai (1977) as Yonosuke
- Taiyō ni Hoero! (1973–86) Semi-regular as Kangorō Samejima
- Kasuga no Tsubone (1989) as Toyotomi Hideyoshi
- Wataru Seken wa Oni Bakari (1990–2005) as Daikichi Okakura

=== Japanese dub ===
- The Bad News Bears (1982 TV Asahi edition) as Morris Buttermaker (Walter Matthau)
- Bozo: The World's Most Famous Clown(1960) as Bozo.
