= Villon's Wife =

- Original Japanese poster
- Directed by: Kichitaro Negishi
- Written by: Yōzō Tanaka
- Cinematography: Takahide Shibanushi
- Edited by: Akimasa Kawashima
- Music by: Takashi Yoshimatsu
- Production companies: Fuji TV; PAPADO Inc.; Shinchosha; Japan Film Broadcasting Corp.
- Distributed by: Toho
- Release date: October 10, 2009 (Japan)
- Running time: 114 minutes
- Country: Japan
- Language: Japanese

Villon's Wife (Japanese: ヴィヨンの妻 〜桜桃とタンポポ〜, Hepburn: Viyon no tsuma – ōtō to tanpopo) is a 2009 Japanese drama film directed by Kichitaro Negishi. It is based on the 1947 short story of the same name by Osamu Dazai.

== Synopsis ==
Sachi is the long-suffering wife of popular novelist Otani in post-World War II Japan. Brilliant but self-destructive, Otani spends his days drinking, running up debts, and looking for inspiration with other women. A visit from Miyo and Kichizo, the owners of the tavern which Otani frequents, informs Sachi that her husband has run up a fortune in debts and has stolen money from them. To pay off the debt, Sachi becomes a waitress at the bar, where her beauty and warmth bring in new customers. While working at the bar, she meets a young laborer, Okada, who falls in love with her. Also on hand are Sachi's old boyfriend, Tsuji, and her husband's mistress, Akiko. Though increasingly empowered by her new independence, Sachi retains her allegiance to her husband.

== Cast ==
- Takako Matsu as Sachi
- Tadanobu Asano as Otani
- Shigeru Muroi as Miyo
- Masatō Ibu as Kichizo
- Ryōko Hirosue as Akiko
- Satoshi Tsumabuki as Okada
- Shinichi Tsutsumi as Tsuji
- Ken Mitsuishi
- Mirai Yamamoto

== Release ==
The film premiered at the Montreal World Film Festival in September 2009 and was released theatrically in Japan on 10 October 2009.

It was released in New York in July 2010 and had its UK premiere in December 2010.

=== Home media ===
Villon's Wife was released on DVD in Japan in April 2010 and in Hong Kong in May 2010.

== Awards ==
2009 Montreal World Film Festival

- Best Director: Kichitaro Negishi

33rd Japan Academy Prize

- Best Actress: Takako Matsu
- Best Art Direction: Yohei Taneda and Kyōko Yauchi

34th Hochi Film Award

- Best Actress: Takako Matsu

2010 Kinema Junpo Award

- Best Actress: Takako Matsu

23rd Nikkan Sports Film Award

- Best Actress: Takako Matsu
