= Shizumanu Taiyō =

- Theatrical release poster
- Kanji: 沈まぬ太陽
- Directed by: Setsurō Wakamatsu
- Screenplay by: Takuya Nishioka
- Based on: Shizumanu Taiyō by Toyoko Yamasaki
- Produced by: Taiichi Inoue; Kazunori Okada; Sadao Ochi; Kiichi Iguchi
- Starring: Ken Watanabe; Tomokazu Miura
- Cinematography: Mutsuo Naganuma
- Edited by: Takao Arai
- Music by: Norihito Sumitomo
- Production company: Kadokawa Pictures
- Distributed by: Toho
- Release date: 24 October 2009 (Japan)
- Running time: 202 minutes
- Country: Japan
- Language: Japanese
- Budget: ¥2.8 billion

Shizumanu Taiyō (Japanese: 沈まぬ太陽; lit. The Never-Setting Sun) is a 2009 Japanese drama film directed by Setsurō Wakamatsu. It is also known as The Unbroken in the United States.

Shizumanu Taiyō is based on a novel by Toyoko Yamasaki which centers on Hajime Onchi, an employee of "NAL," a large national airline. The first part of the novel focuses on Onchi's activity as the chairman of the employees' union in the 1960s; his reward for fighting for better working conditions for the staff is a series of postings abroad, to Pakistan, Iran, and finally Kenya, a destination to which the company does not even fly. The second and third parts of the novel take place in 1985 and chronicle the crash of a jumbo jet and its aftermath within the company.

The events portrayed in the story are based upon actual events that took place at Japan Airlines. The character of Onchi is based upon JAL labor organizer and author Hirotaro Ogura, and the pivotal crash portrayed in the novel is based closely upon the crash of Japan Air Lines Flight 123 (up to having the same flight number and taking place at the same location, date and time). Several politicians and JAL executives portrayed in the story are also based on real-world counterparts. JAL objected strongly to both the novel and the film, stating that they were defamatory to the airline and disrespected the victims of the actual Flight 123. The novel claims to be a work based upon real-life events, while the film claims to be entirely a work of fiction.

The cast of the film includes Ken Watanabe as Onchi, with Kōji Ishizaka, Kyōka Suzuki, Yasuko Matsuyuki and Tomokazu Miura in supporting roles. The violinist Diana Yukawa, whose father died in the real-world crash of JAL Flight 123, was involved in the music for the film.

The film's premiere was on 24 October 2009 in Ginza. Its theme song, "Little Prayer", was performed by Yukawa.

== Cast ==
- Ken Watanabe as Hajime Onchi
- Tomokazu Miura as Shiro Gyoten
- Teruyuki Kagawa as Kazuo Yagi
- Kyōka Suzuki as Ritsuko Onchi
- Erika Toda as Junko Onchi
- Gō Katō as the prime minister Yasushi Tonegawa (based on Yasuhiro Nakasone)
- Nenji Kobayashi as the deputy prime minister Takemaru (based on Shin Kanemaru)
- Tōru Shinagawa as Issei Ryuzaki (based on Ryūzō Sejima)
- Kōji Ishizaka as Masayuki Kunimi
- Tae Kimura as Natsuko Suzuki
- Yasuko Matsuyuki as Miki Mitsui

== Awards and nominations ==
34th Hochi Film Awards

- Won: Best Film
- Won: Best Actor - Ken Watanabe

33rd Japan Academy Prize

- Won: Best Film
- Won: Best Actor - Ken Watanabe
