= Isshin Inudo =

Japanese film director (born 1960)

- 犬童 一心
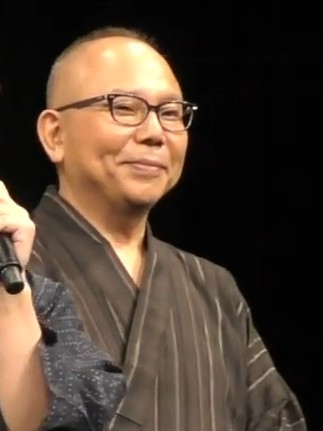
- Born: 24 June 1960 (age 66); Tokyo, Japan
- Occupation: Film director

Isshin Inudo (犬童 一心, Inudō Isshin; born 24 June 1960) is a Japanese film director.

== Career ==
Inudo began making films on his own in high school, with one of his works being selected for the 1979 Pia Film Festival. After attending Tokyo Zokei University, he found work at Asahi Promotions where he began directing television commercials, including some award winning ones. He made his feature-length film debut in 1995 with Futari ga Shabette iru, which earned him the Directors Guild of Japan New Directors Award. Josee, the Tiger and the Fish (2003) earned him the Minister of Education New Director Award for Fine Art.

== Filmography ==
=== Director ===
- Kibun wo kaete (1979, short film)
- Aka-suika ki-suika (1982)
- Natsu ga ippai no monogatari (1983)
- Nanimo kamo 100 kai mo iwaretakoto (1985)
- Roido yori (1988)
- Kingyo no isshou (1993)
- Futari ga Shabette Iru, aka Two People Talking (1995)
- Across a Gold Prairie (1999)
- Josee, the Tiger and the Fish (2003)
- Blooming Again (2004)
- Te wo nigiru dorobou no hanashi (2004)
- Densetsu no wani Jeiku, aka Tracing Jake (2004)
- All About My Dog (2005)
- Touch (2005)
- House of Himiko (2005)
- Yellow Tears (2006)
- Bizan (2007)
- Gou Gou, the Cat (2008)
- Zero Focus (2009)
- Bukatsudō (2010, miniseries)
- Azamijō no lullaby (2010, TV series) - 2 episodes
- The Floating Castle (2012)
- Irodori himura (2012, miniseries) - 1 episode
- Dark System: Koi No Ohza Ketteisen (2014, miniseries) - 1 episode
- Miracle: Devil Claus' Love and Magic (2014)
- Gou-Gou Datte Neko de Aru (2014-2016, TV series) - 9 episodes
- To Give a Dream (2015, miniseries) - 4 episodes
- Sora ni sumu (2016)
- The Cat in Their Arms (2018)
- Seijo Story: 60 Years of Making Films (2019, documentary)
- Samurai Shifters (2019)
- The Bucket List, aka Way to Find the Best Life (2019)
- The Unnameable Dance (2021, documentary)
- Haw (2022)

=== Writer ===
- Osaka Story (1999)
- Yomigaeri (2002) - Co-writer
- Sailor Zombie (2014, TV series)

=== Actor ===
- Ready Made (1982)
- Shin Godzilla (2016) - Ancient Organism Scholar
- Labyrinth of Cinema (2019) - Yamanaka
