= Ryōko Hirosue =

Japanese actress and singer (born 1980)

- 広末 涼子
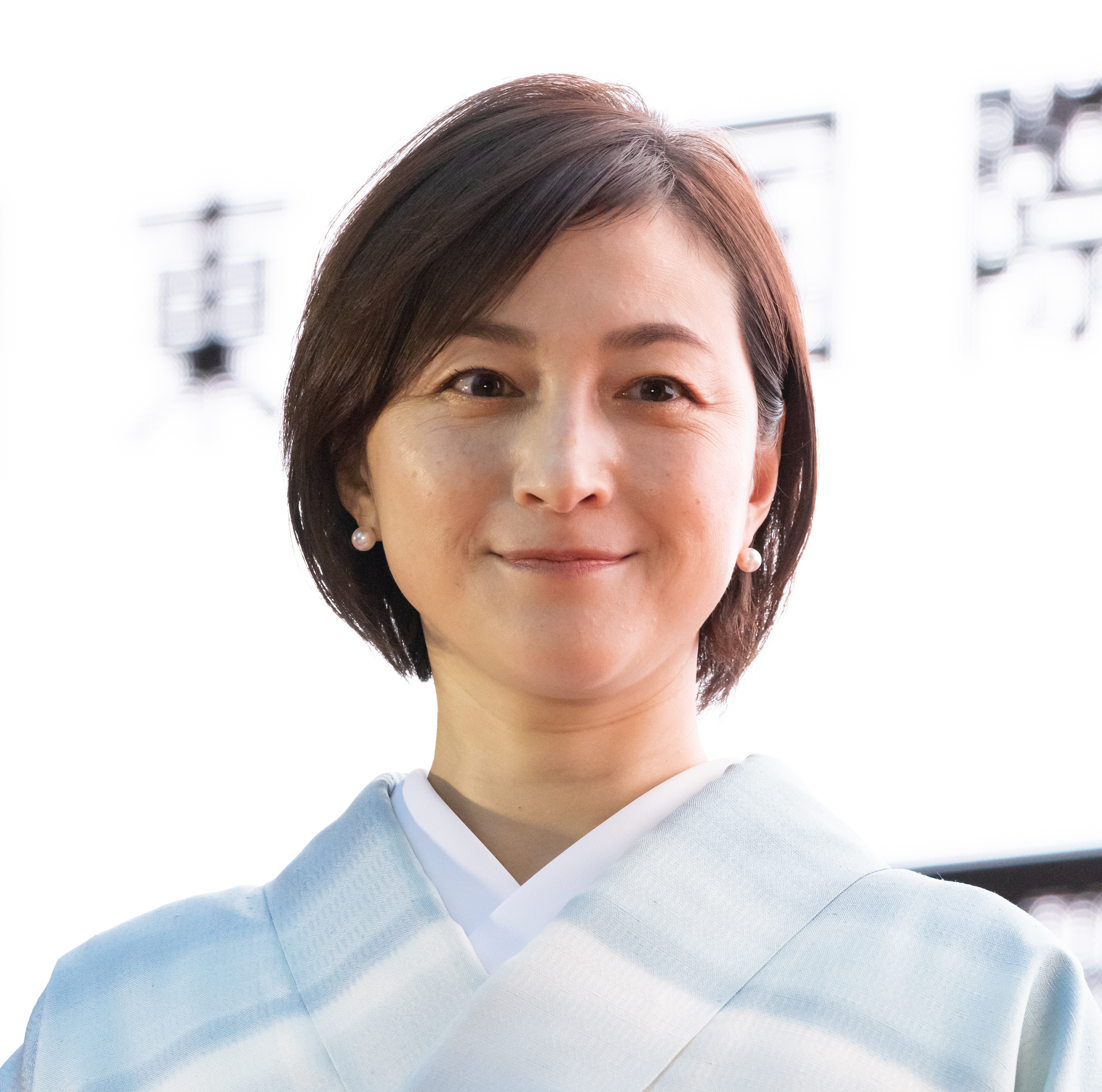
- Hirosue in 2022
- Born: 18 July 1980 (age 46); Yokohama, Kanagawa Prefecture, Japan
- Occupations: Actres; singer
- Years active: 1994–2023; 2024–2025; 2026–present
- Spouses: Takahiro Okazawa (m. 2003; div. 2008); Jun Izutsu (m. 2010; div. 2023)
- Children: 3
- Musical career
- Genre: J-pop
- Instrument: Vocals
- Label: Warner Music Japan

Ryōko Hirosue (広末 涼子, Hirosue Ryōko; born 18 July 1980) is a Japanese actress and singer, best known to international audiences for her roles in the Luc Besson-produced Wasabi (2001) and the Academy Award-winning Japanese film Departures (2008). She also starred in the 2008 comedy series Yasuko to Kenji.

== Early life ==
Hirosue was born in Yokohama, Kanagawa Prefecture and grew up in Kōchi city, Kōchi prefecture, Japan. She joined the "P&G" cosmetic model competition at age 14 and made her television debut the following year singing on the program, TK Music Camp. She made her television drama debut and is well known for her work as a spokesmodel for NTT DoCoMo. She studied at Waseda University but did not graduate.

== Career ==
=== 1995–2000: Beginnings ===
Hirosue made her television debut in 1995 at age 15 in Fuji TV's Heart ni S. She was also named "Best Newcomer" at the 10th Television Drama Academy Awards the same year when she starred in Fuji TV's comedy series Shota no Sushi. In 1997, she appeared in the finale of medical drama Hoshi no Kinka and the special episode of Odoru Daisousasen before making her breakthrough performance in Fuji TV's comedy series Beach Boys, where she was awarded "Best Supporting Actress" at the 14th Television Drama Academy Awards. Hirosue also made her film debut in the same year when she appeared in 20-seki Nostalgia which won her critical acclaim. She was awarded the Sponichi Grand Prize New Talent Award at the Mainichi Film Awards, Best New Talent at the Yokohama Film Festival and perhaps most importantly, the Newcomer of the Year award at the 21st Japanese Academy Awards.

In 1998, Hirosue reprised her role in the special episode of Beach Boys while also appearing in four other television dramas in the same year. In 1999, she returned to the big screen in Poppoya and Himitsu. Her performances in both films won her much praise from award-giving bodies of Japan and she received two nominations at the 23rd Japanese Academy Awards for Best Actress (for Himitsu) and Best Supporting Actress (for Poppoya). Her international profile also increased when she received the Best Actress prize for her performance in Himitsu at the 30th Sitges - Catalan International Film Festival.

She returned prominently to television in 2000 playing Yuki Katase in the drama Summer Snow, which won 5 awards at the 26th Television Drama Academy Awards including "Best Supporting Actress" and "Best Drama" before showing off her comedic chops in TBS's Oyaji. The latter role again won her "Best Supporting Actress" at the 27th awards ceremony.

=== 2001–2005: Hollywood debut and international breakthrough ===
In 2001, Hirosue made her international film debut in the French Film Wasabi written by Luc Besson and directed by Gérard Krawczyk. Not being able to speak French for her role, she had to learn her lines phonetically. She also reunited for the fourth time on television with her frequent co-star Yutaka Takenouchi (they starred together in Long Vacation, Beach Boys and Seikimatsu no Uta) in Fuji TV's romantic comedy series Dekichatta Kekkon, starring as an expectant couple who did not know each other well before their one-night stand leading to the planning of a shotgun wedding. The series also starred Hiroshi Abe who won Best Supporting Actor at the 30th Television Drama Academy Awards.

In 2002, Hirosue appeared in the film Renai Shashin and the low-rated television drama Ai Nante Irane Yo, Natsu before capping the year in the family drama series Otousan. She reunited with her Summer Snow lead co-star, Tsuyoshi Dōmoto, in 2003's romance series Moto Kare. Her portrayal as the initially flippant ex-girlfriend, Makoto Saeki, won her "Best Supporting Actress" yet again at the 38th Television Drama Academy Awards.

Hirosue married model Takahiro Okazawa on December 2003. And gave birth to her first child in 2004. Her marriage and new motherhood decreased her workload and she only made one appearance in 2004 in the film Hana and Alice and one appearance on 2005's Fuji TV's romance drama Slow Dance.

=== 2006–2023: Continued success, Shukan Bunshun report, and hiatus ===
Hirosue returned to film and television in 2006 by appearing in three television dramas, a TV movie and a film. In 2007, she co-starred for the third time with Hiroshi Abe (her fellow actor in Dekichatta Kekkon and Haruka Naru Yakusoku) in the film Bubble Fiction: Boom or Bust. She also appeared in two TV movies, Mama ga Ryori o Tsukuru Wake, broadcast by Fuji TV, and Long Wedding Road!, which was broadcast by TBS. Hirosue also made a guest appearance in the third episode, "Rattles", of the detective series Galileo.

She had a supporting role in NTV's comedy series Yasuko to Kenji in 2008.

She portrayed Mika Kobayashi opposite Masahiro Motoki in the 2008 Japanese film Departures, which won the 81st Academy Awards Best Foreign Language Film.

In 2009, she is starring in the remake of the mystery film Zero Focus and the adaptation to film of the novel Villon's Wife by Osamu Dazai.

She co-starred in the 2010 film Flowers with Yū Aoi, Kyōka Suzuki, Yūko Takeuchi, Rena Tanaka and Yukie Nakama.

In 2016, Hirose started Fuji TV series Naomi and Kaneko is based Hideo Okuda's novel with same name.

In June 2023, after her affair was exposed by the tabloid magazine Shukan Bunshun, she announced she would retire from the entertainment industry.

=== 2024–2025: Resumption of activities, going independent, and second hiatus ===
In February 2024, she resumed her entertainment activities by leaving her agency and going independent.

On April 8, 2025, Hirosue was arrested after causing a traffic accident on an expressway in Shizuoka Prefecture and injuring a nurse at the hospital to which she had been transported. On April 16, she was released from custody. Displaying signs of psychological instability, her agency announced on May 2 that she had been diagnosed with bipolar disorder and hyperthyroidism, and that she would suspend all entertainment activities and receive treatment under medical supervision. In late July 2025, NHK quoted sources saying that Hirosue and the nurse had reached an out-of-court settlement, while police voluntarily continued their investigation. In December 2025, prosecutors moved for summary judgment against Hirosue for the automobile accident, while declining to pursue action over the alleged injury to the nurse. The following month, Hirosue was fined ¥700,000 (US$4,470) for negligent driving. She then took a second hiatus to reflect on herself regarding these events and learn from them.

=== 2026–present ===
On April 1, 2026, Hirosue announced she would be resuming her career again.

== Personal life ==
She married Okazawa Takahiro in December 2003. The marriage ended in early 2008. On 9 October 2010 she married Jun Izutsu, a candle artist. They met in Haiti in March 2010 participating in earthquake relief efforts. Her cousin Kazuya Mimura is a former member of the House of Representatives in Japan.

She has three children. She gave birth to her first son in April 2004, second son on 10 March 2011 and a daughter on 17 July 2015.

On 7 June 2023, Shūkan Bunshun reported that Hirosue was allegedly having an extramarital affair with married Michelin star chef Shusaku Toba, after the two were spotted entering the Cerulean Tower Tokyo Hotel together. This was later confirmed by Hirosue herself through her official social media account apologizing on the incident. Her agency announced her divorce with Jun Izutsu on 26 July 2023. She holds custody of her three children as their guardian.

== Filmography ==
=== Film ===
| Year | Title | Role | Notes | Ref. |
|---|---|---|---|---|
| 1999 | Poppoya | Yukiko Sato | | |
| 1999 | Himitsu | Monami / Naoko | Lead role | |
| 2001 | Wasabi | Yumi Yoshimido | French film | |
| 2007 | Bubble Fiction: Boom or Bust | Mayumi Tanaka | Lead role | |
| 2008 | Departures | Mika Kobayashi | | |
| 2009 | Zero Focus | Teiko Ubara | Lead role | |
| 2009 | Villon's Wife | Akiko | | |
| 2012 | Key of Life | Kanae Mizushima | | |
| 2014 | Lingering Spirits | Yuko Kasahara | | |
| 2014 | Nutcracker Fantasy | Queen Morphia (voice) | | |
| 2014 | Snow on the Blades | Shimura Setsu | | |
| 2015 | Hana's Miso Soup | Chie Yasutake | Lead role | |
| 2017 | Mixed Doubles | Yayoi Yoshioka | | |
| 2022 | The Confidence Man JP: Episode of the Hero | Namiko Nirayama | | |
| 2022 | The Hound of the Baskervilles: Sherlock the Movie | Roko Fukura | | |
| 2022 | 2 Women | Shōko Shiraki | | |
| 2023 | Hard Days | Misako Kudō | | |

=== Television ===
| Year | Title | Role | Notes | Ref. |
|---|---|---|---|---|
| 1996 | Long Vacation | Takako Saito | | |
| 1997 | Beach Boys | Makoto Izumi | | |
| 1997 | Sekai de Ichiban Papa ga Suki | Tami Nakamachi | | |
| 1998 | Summer Snow | Yuki Katase | | |
| 1998 | When the Saints Go Marching In | Arisu Tsuchiya | | |
| 1999 | Lipstick | Ai Hayakawa | | |
| 2000 | Oyaji | Suzu | | |
| 2001 | Shotgun Marriage | Chiyo Kotani | Lead role | |
| 2003 | My Ex | Makoto Saeki | | |
| 2005 | Slow Dance | Mino Koike | | |
| 2007 | Galileo | Yayoi Kanzaki | Episode 3 | |
| 2010 | Ryōmaden | Hirai Kao | Taiga drama | |
| 2022 | Riding a Unicorn | Sachi Haneda | | |
| 2023 | Ranman | Hisa Makino | Asadora | |

== Theater ==
Theater performances
| Year | Title | Role | Notes | Ref. |
|---|---|---|---|---|
| 2012–13 | Bring Me My Chariot of Fire | Lee Soon-woo | | |

== Discography ==
=== Albums ===
- Arigato! (1997)
- Private (1999)

=== Singles ===
- "Maji de Koisuru Gobyōmae" (1997)
- "Daisuki!" (1997)
- "Wind Prism" (1997)
- "Jeans" (1998) (featuring B-side "Private")
- "Summer Sunset" (1998)
- "Tomorrow" (1999)
- "Kajitsu" (2000)

=== Compilations and live albums ===
- Winter Gift 98 (1998)
- RH Singles &... (1999)
- RH Debut Tour 1999 (1999)
- Super Idol Series (Fukada Kyoko vs Hirosue Ryoko) (2000)
- RH Remix (2001)
- Hirosue Ryoko Perfect Collection (2002)

== Photobooks ==
- R (1996)
- H (1996)
- No Make (1998)
- FLaMme (1998)
- Le Secret (1999)
- Relax (1999)
- Ryoko Hirosue CF Special (1999)
- Happy 20th Birthday (2000)
- Teens 1996–2000 (2000)
- Newyork RH Avenue 2003 (2003)
- Triangle Photographs (2009)

== Awards and nominations ==
| Year | Nominee / work | Award | Result |
|---|---|---|---|
| 1998 | 20th Century Nostalgia | Awards of the Japanese Academy: Newcomer of the Year | Won |
| 1998 | 20th Century Nostalgia | Mainichi Film Concours: Sponichi Grand Prize New Talent Award | Won |
| 1998 | 20th Century Nostalgia | Yokohama Film Festival: Best New Talent | Won |
| 1998 | 20th Century Nostalgia | Osaka Film Festival: Best New Talent | Won |
| 1999 | – | Nikkan Sports Film Awards: Best New Talent | Won |
| 2000 | Himitsu | Sitges - Catalan International Film Festival: Best Actress | Won |
| 2000 | Himitsu | Awards of the Japanese Academy: Best Actress | Nominated |
| 2000 | Poppoya | Awards of the Japanese Academy: Best Supporting Actress | Nominated |
| 2008 | Departures | Awards of the Japanese Academy: Best Actress | Nominated |
| 2008 | Departures | Yokohama Film Festival: Best Supporting Actress | Won |
| 2009 | Zero Focus | Awards of the Japanese Academy: Best Actress | Nominated |
| 2013 | Key of Life | Blue Ribbon Awards: Best Supporting Actress | Won |
| 2022 | 2 Women and The Hound of the Baskervilles | Nikkan Sports Film Awards: Best Supporting Actress | Nominated |
| 2022 | 2 Women | Hochi Film Awards: Best Supporting Actress | Nominated |
| 2023 | 2 Women | Mainichi Film Awards: Best Supporting Actress | Nominated |
| 2023 | 2 Women and The Hound of the Baskervilles | Blue Ribbon Awards: Best Supporting Actress | Nominated |
| 2023 | 2 Women, The Hound of the Baskervilles and others | Kinema Junpo Awards: Best Supporting Actress | Won |
