= List of Japanese films of 2014 =

A list of Japanese films that were released in 2014.

== Highest-grossing films ==
The following is a list of the 10 highest-grossing Japanese films at the Japanese box office during 2014, according to the Motion Picture Producers Association of Japan.

| Rank | Title | Gross |
|---|---|---|
| 1 | The Eternal Zero | ¥8.76 billion |
| 2 | Stand by Me Doraemon | ¥8.38 billion |
| 3 | Rurouni Kenshin: Kyoto Inferno | ¥5.22 billion |
| 4 | Thermae Romae II | ¥4.42 billion |
| 5 | Rurouni Kenshin: The Legend Ends | ¥4.35 billion |
| 6 | Lupin the 3rd vs. Detective Conan: The Movie | ¥4.26 billion |
| 7 | Detective Conan: Dimensional Sniper | ¥4.11 billion |
| 8 | Doraemon: New Nobita's Great Demon—Peko and the Exploration Party of Five | ¥3.58 billion |
| 9 | When Marnie Was There | ¥3.53 billion |
| 10 | Pokémon the Movie: Diancie and the Cocoon of Destruction | ¥2.91 billion |

== Film releases ==
=== January – March ===
| Opening | | Title | Cast and crew | Details | Genre(s) | Ref(s) |
|---|---|---|---|---|---|---|
| J A N U A R Y | 10 | Wake Up, Girls! – Seven Idols | Director: Yutaka Yamamoto; Cast: Mayu Yoshioka, Airi Eino, Minami Tanaka, Yoshino Aoyama, Nanami Yamashita | Based on a light novel. | Musical | |
| J A N U A R Y | 17 | Black Butler | Director: Kentaro Otani, Keiichi Sato, Choi Dong-hoon; Cast: Hiro Mizushima, Ayame Gōriki, Yuka, Mizuki Yamamoto | Based on a manga. | Historical, Fantasy, Action | |
| J A N U A R Y | 24 | Genome Hazard | Director: Kim Sung-soo; Cast: Hidetoshi Nishijima, Kim Hyo-jin, Yōko Maki, Yuri Nakamura | Based on a novel. | Thriller, Action | |
| J A N U A R Y | 25 | The Idolmaster Movie: Beyond the Brilliant Future! | Director: Atsushi Nishigori; Cast: Eriko Nakamura, Akiko Hasegawa, Asami Imai | Based on a video game. | Drama, Musical | |
| J A N U A R Y | 25 | The Little House | Director: Yoji Yamada; Cast: Takako Matsu, Haru Kuroki, Hidetaka Yoshioka, Satoshi Tsumabuki, Chieko Baisho | Based on a novel. | Historical, Drama | |
| F E B R U A R Y | 1 | Haganai | Director: Takurō Oikawa; Cast: Kōji Seto, Kie Kitano, Mio Otani, Sayu Kubota, Aki Asakura, Sara Takatsuki | Based on a manga. | Drama, Romance | |
| F E B R U A R Y | 1 | I Just Wanna Hug You | Director: Akihiko Shiota; Cast: Keiko Kitagawa, Ryo Nishikido, Yusuke Kamiji, Takumi Saitoh, Aya Hirayama | | Drama, Romance | |
| F E B R U A R Y | 8 | Buddha 2 | Director: Toshiaki Komura; Cast: Sayuri Yoshinaga, Hidetaka Yoshioka, Ken'ichi Matsuyama | Based on a manga. | Historical, Fantasy | |
| F E B R U A R Y | 8 | Tiger & Bunny: The Rising | Director: Yoshitomo Yonetani; Cast: Hiroaki Hirata, Masakazu Morita, Minako Kotobuki, Go Inoue | Based on an anime. | Drama, Action, Mecha | |
| F E B R U A R Y | 8 | Bodacious Space Pirates: Abyss of Hyperspace | Director: Tatsuo Satō; Cast: Mikako Komatsu, Kana Hanazawa, Shizuka Itō, Masaya Matsukaze | Based on a light novel. | Action, Sci-fi | |
| F E B R U A R Y | 8 | The Tale of Nishino | Director: Nami Iguchi; Cast: Yutaka Takenouchi, Machiko Ono, Riko Narumi, Fumino Kimura | Based on a novel. | Drama | |
| F E B R U A R Y | 15 | The Mole Song: Undercover Agent Reiji | Director: Katsushi Sakurabi; Cast: Toma Ikuta, Eita, Tsubasa Honda, Shinichi Tsutsumi | Based on a manga. | Comedy, Action | |
| F E B R U A R Y | 22 | Girl's Blood | Director: Koichi Sakamoto; Cast: Yuria Haga, Asami Tada, Ayame Misaki, Rina Koike | Based on a novel. | Action | |
| F E B R U A R Y | 22 | Giovanni's Island | Director: Mizuho Nishikubo; Cast: Masachika Ichimura, Yukie Nakama, Kanako Yanagihara, Yūsuke Santamaria, Kōta Yokoyama | Based on a novel. | Historical, Drama | |
| F E B R U A R Y | 22 | Kamen Teacher | Director: Kentaro Moriya; Cast: Taisuke Fujigaya, Aya Ōmasa, Takumi Saitoh, Fuma Kikuchi, Jesse Lewis | Based on a manga. | Action, Drama | |
| M A R C H | 1 | Kiki's Delivery Service | Director: Takashi Shimizu; Cast: Fūka Koshiba, Ryōhei Hirota, Machiko Ono, Hiroshi Yamamoto, Miho Kanazawa | Based on a novel. | Romance | |
| M A R C H | 1 | Love's Whirlpool | Director: Daisuke Miura; Cast: Sosuke Ikematsu, Mugi Kadowaki, Kenichi Takitō, Eriko Nakamura, Hirofumi Arai | Based on a novel. | Romance | |
| M A R C H | 7 | Silver Spoon | Director: Keisuke Yoshida; Cast: Kento Nakajima, Alice Hirose, Tomohiro Ichikawa, Haru Kuroki, Ryuhei Ueshima | Based on a manga. | Drama, Comedy | |
| M A R C H | 8 | Doraemon: New Nobita's Great Demon—Peko and the Exploration Party of Five | Director: Shinnosuke Yakuwa; Cast: Wasabi Mizuta, Megumi Ōhara | Based on a manga. | Children's | |
| M A R C H | 8 | Puzzle | Director: Eisuke Naito; Cast: Kaho, Shuhei Nomura, Kazuya Takahashi, Saori Yagi | Based on a novel. | Horror, Mystery | |
| M A R C H | 15 | Pretty Rhythm All Star Selection: Prism Show Best Ten | Director: Masakazu Hishida; Cast: Kana Asumi, Sayuri Hara, Azusa Enoki, Madoka Yonezawa, Satomi Akesaka | Based on a manga. | Musical | |
| M A R C H | 15 | Pretty Cure All-Stars New Stage 3: Eien no Tomodachi | Director: Kouji Ogawa; Cast: Megumi Nakajima, Megumi Han, Hitomi Nabatame, Minako Kotobuki, Mai Fuchigami | Based on an anime. | Fantasy, Action | |
| M A R C H | 15 | Sekai-ichi Hatsukoi: Yokozawa Takafumi no Baai | Director: Chiaki Kon; Cast: Takashi Kondō, Katsuyuki Konishi, Yukari Tamura, Shinnosuke Tachibana | Based on a manga. | Romance | |
| M A R C H | 21 | In His Chart 2 | Director: Yoshihiro Fukagawa; Cast: Sho Sakurai, Aoi Miyazaki, Tatsuya Fujiwara | Based on a novel. | Drama | |
| M A R C H | 29 | The Snow White Murder Case | Director: Yoshihiro Nakamura; Cast: Mao Inoue, Gou Ayano, Misako Renbutsu | Based on a novel. | Drama, Crime | |

=== April – June ===
| Opening | | Title | Cast and crew | Details | Genre(s) | Ref(s) |
|---|---|---|---|---|---|---|
| A P R I L | 5 | Sakurasaku ~Blossoms Bloom~ | Director: Mitsutoshi Tanaka; Cast: Naoto Ogata, Kaho Minami, Masato Yano, Karen Miyama, Tatsuya Fuji | Based on a novel. | Drama | |
| A P R I L | 5 | Walk Together | Director: Masaki Miyamoto; Cast: Ryota Ozawa, Noriko Iriyama, Aoba Kawai, Naomi Nagashima | Based on a novel. | Drama | |
| A P R I L | 12 | L DK | Director: Taisuke Kawamura; Cast: Ayame Goriki, Kento Yamazaki, Rei Okamoto, Miho Shiraishi | Based on a manga. | Romance | |
| A P R I L | 18 | Detective Conan: Dimensional Sniper | Director: Kōbun Shizuno; Cast: Minami Takayama, Wakana Yamazaki | Based on a manga. | Mystery | |
| A P R I L | 18 | Crayon Shin-chan: Intense Battle! Robo Dad Strikes Back | Director: Wataru Takahashi; Cast: Cast: Yumiko Kobayashi, Miki Narahashi, Toshiyuki Morikawa | Based on a manga. | Comedy | |
| A P R I L | 26 | Heaven's Lost Property Final: Eternal My Master | Director: Hisashi Saitō; Cast: Soichiro Hoshi, Saori Hayami, Mina, Tatsuhisa Suzuki | Based on a manga. | Fantasy | |
| A P R I L | 26 | Thermae Romae II | Director: Hideki Takeuchi; Cast: Cast: Hiroshi Abe, Aya Ueto, Kazuki Kitamura, Riki Takeuchi | Based on a manga. | Comedy | |
| M A Y | 2 | Akumu-chan | Director: Noriyoshi Sakuma; Cast: Keiko Kitagawa, Manatsu Kimura, Fumiyo Kohinata, Gackt | Based on a novel. | Fantasy, Comedy | |
| M A Y | 10 | Wood Job! | Director: Shinobu Yaguchi; Cast: Shōta Sometani, Masami Nagasawa, Hideaki Itō, Yuka | Based on a novel. | Comedy | |
| M A Y | 10 | LIVE | Director: Noboru Iguchi; Cast: Yūki Yamada, Ito Ōno, Yūki Morinaga, Mari Iriki | Based on a novel. | Horror, Mystery | |
| M A Y | 17 | Flower and Snake: Zero | Director: Hajime Hashimoto; Cast: Maiko Amano, Noriko Hamada, Rina Sakuragi | Based on a film series. | Drama, Thriller | |
| M A Y | 17 | Recently, My Sister Is Unusual | Director: Yuki Aoyama; Cast: Tenka Hashimoto, Yukichi Kobayashi, Mayu, Mika Yano | Based on a light novel. | Comedy, Romance | |
| M A Y | 23 | Kotodama – Spiritual Curse | Director: Masayuki Ochiai; Cast: Ayano Konishi, Miyu Yamabe, Hitomi Arai | Based on a television series. | Horror | 。 |
| M A Y | 24 | A Bolt from the Blue | Director: Hitori Gekidan; Cast: Yo Oizumi, Ko Shibasaki, Hitori Gekidan, Takashi Sasano, Morio Kazama | Based on a novel. | Drama, Comedy drama | |
| M A Y | 24 | Kikaider Reboot | Director: Ten Shimoyama; Cast: Jingi Irie, Kazushige Nagashima, Aimi Satsukawa, Yuto Ikeda, Ryuji Harada | Based on a television series. | Sci-fi, Action | |
| M A Y | 31 | Samurai Pirates | Director: Kenichi Omori; Cast: Kyoka Shibata, Masaki Izawa, Wakana Aoi | Based on a novel. | Historical, Drama | |
| M A Y | 31 | All-Round Appraiser Q: The Eyes of Mona Lisa | Director: Shinsuke Sato; Cast: Haruka Ayase, Tori Matsuzaka, Eriko Hatsune, Pierre Deladonchamps | Based on a novel. | Drama, Mystery | |
| J U N E | 7 | Jossy's | Director: Yuichi Fukuda; Cast: Mirei Kiritani, Mina Fujii, Mitsuki Takahata, Kasumi Arimura, | Based on a manga. | Superheroes, Comedy | |
| J U N E | 7 | Persona 3 The Movie: No. 2, Midsummer Knight's Dream | Director: Tomohisa Taguchi; Cast: Akira Ishida, Megumi Toyoguchi, Kōsuke Toriumi, Rie Tanaka | Based on a video game. | Dark fantasy, Action | |
| J U N E | 14 | Climbing to Spring | Director: Daisaku Kimura; Cast: Shinichi Tsutsumi, Yūya Yagira | Based on a novel. | Drama | |
| J U N E | 14 | My Man (2014 film) | Director: Kazuyoshi Kumakiri; Cast: Fumi Nikaidō, Tadanobu Asano, Kengo Kora, Mochika Yamada, Moroka Moro | Based on a novel. | Fantasy, Drama | |
| J U N E | 14 | Sweet Poolside | Director: Daigo Matsui, Luc Besson; Cast: Kenta Suga, Yuiko Kariya, Shota Matsuda, Mitsuki Tanimura, Takayuki Kinoshita | Based on a novel. | Drama, Romance | |
| J U N E | 14 | My Hawaiian Discovery | Director: Koji Maeda; Cast: Nana Eikura, Rin Takanashi, Kōji Seto, Ryo Kase, Sosuke Ikematsu | | Drama | |
| J U N E | 21 | Samurai Hustle | Director: Katsuhide Motoki; Cast: Kuranosuke Sasaki, Kyoko Fukada, Tsuyoshi Ihara, Yasufumi Terawaki, Yusuke Kamiji | Based on a novel. | Historical, Comedy | |
| J U N E | 21 | Saint Seiya: Legend of Sanctuary | Director: Keiichi Sato; Cast: Kaito Ishikawa, Ayaka Sasaki, Kenshō Ono, Nobuhiko Okamoto | Based on a manga series. | Fantasy, Action | |
| J U N E | 28 | Gaki Rock | Director: Yūji Nakamae; Cast: Taiko Katono, Kōki Maeda, Yōsuke Kawamura, Ryōji Nakamura | Based on a manga. | Drama, Musical, Youth | |
| J U N E | 28 | Doreiku: Tokyo Slaves | Director: Sakichi Sato; Cast: Sayaka Akimoto, Kanata Hongō, Hikaru Ōsawa, Yūki Yamada | Based on a novel. | Drama, Thriller | |
| J U N E | 28 | Ju-On: The Beginning of the End | Director: Masayuki Ochiai; Cast: Nozomi Sasaki, Sho Aoyagi, Reina Triendl, Miho Kanazawa | Based on a franchise. | Horror | |

=== July – September ===
| Opening | | Title | Cast and crew | Details | Genre(s) | Ref(s) |
|---|---|---|---|---|---|---|
| J U L Y | 4 | Ao Oni | Director: Daisuke Nibayashi; Cast: Anna Iriyama, Kenta Suga, Seika Furuhata | Based on a video game. | Horror, Action | |
| J U L Y | 4 | The World of Kanako | Director: Tetsuya Nakashima; Cast: Kōji Yakusho, Nana Komatsu, Satoshi Tsumabuki, Joe Odagiri, Fumi Nikaidō | Based on a novel. | Drama, Thriller | |
| J U L Y | 12 | Say I Love You | Director: Asako Hyuga; Cast: Haruna Kawaguchi, Sota Fukushi, Rima Nishizaki, Tasuku Nagase, Rika Adachi | Based on a manga. | Romance, Youth | |
| J U L Y | 12 | K: Missing Kings | Director: Shingo Suzuki; Cast: Daisuke Namikawa, Daisuke Ono, Kenjiro Tsuda, Mikako Komatsu, Tomokazu Sugita | Based on an anime. | Drama, Action, Sci-fi | |
| J U L Y | 19 | Pokémon the Movie: Diancie and the Cocoon of Destruction | Director: Kunihiko Yuyama, Mikinori Sakakibara; Cast: Rica Matsumoto, Ikue Ōtani, Masachika Ichimura | Based on a video game. | Fantasy, Action | |
| J U L Y | 19 | The Torture Club | Director: Kōta Yoshida; Cast: Noriko Kijima, Haruna Yoshizumi, Yuki Mamiya | Based on a manga. | Comedy, Thriller | |
| J U L Y | 19 | When Marnie Was There | Director: Hiromasa Yonebayashi; Cast: Sara Takatsuki, Kasumi Arimura, Hana Sugisaki, Hitomi Kuroki, Ryoko Moriyama | Based on a novel. | Drama | |
| J U L Y | 26 | Still the Water | Director: Naomi Kawase; Cast: Nijiro Murakami, Jun Yoshinaga, Tetta Sugimoto, Miyuki Matsuda | | Drama, Science fantasy | |
| A U G U S T | 1 | Rurouni Kenshin: Kyoto Inferno | Director: Keishi Ōtomo; Cast: Takeru Satoh, Emi Takei, Munetaka Aoki, Yū Aoi | Based on a manga. | Historical, Action | |
| A U G U S T | 8 | Stand by Me Doraemon | Director: Takashi Yamazaki, Ryūichi Yagi; Cast: Wasabi Mizuta, Satoshi Tsumabuki, Yumi Kakazu, Tomokazu Seki, Subaru Kimura | Based on a manga. | Drama, Sci-fi | |
| A U G U S T | 8 | Space Brothers #0 | Director: Ayumu Watanabe; Cast: Hiroaki Hirata, KENN, Miyuki Sawashiro, Masayuki Katō | Based on a manga. | Comedy, Sci-fi | |
| A U G U S T | 16 | Hot Road | Director: Takahiro Miki; Cast: Rena Nōnen, Hiroomi Tosaka, Yoshino Kimura, Yukiyoshi Ozawa, Ryohei Suzuki | Based on a manga. | Drama, Action | |
| A U G U S T | 23 | New Initial D the Movie | Director: Masamitsu Hidaka, Tomohito Naka; Cast: Mamoru Miyano, Hiroaki Hirata, Maaya Uchida, Hiroshi Tsuchida | Based on a manga. | Action | |
| A U G U S T | 23 | Over Your Dead Body | Director: Takashi Miike; Cast: Ichikawa Ebizō XI, Ko Shibasaki, Hideaki Itō, Miho Nakanishi, Maiko | | Horror, Dark fantasy | |
| A U G U S T | 30 | Little Forest | Director: Junichi Mori; Cast: Ai Hashimoto, Takahiro Miura, Mayu Matsuoka, Yoichi Nukumizu | Based on a manga. | Fantasy, Drama | |
| A U G U S T | 30 | Lupin the 3rd (film) | Director: Ryuhei Kitamura; Cast: Shun Oguri, Issey Takahashi, Jerry Yan, Meisa Kuroki, Tetsuji Tamayama, Gō Ayano, Tadanobu Asano | Based on a manga. | Action, Comedy | |
| S E P T E M B E R | 6 | A Record of Sweet Murder | Director: Kōji Shiraishi; Cast: Yeon Je-wook, Kim Kkot-bi, Tsukasa Aoi, Ryotaro Yonemura, Park Jeong-yoon | Based on a novel. | Horror, Thriller | |
| S E P T E M B E R | 6 | Sister Game | Director: Rikya Imaizumi; Cast: Tomoya Maeno, Momoko Tani, Kayo Satoh, Yukie Kawamura | Based on a manga. | Romance | |
| S E P T E M B E R | 13 | Rurouni Kenshin: The Legend Ends | Director: Keishi Ōtomo; Cast: Takeru Satoh, Emi Takei, Munetaka Aoki, Yū Aoi | Based on a manga. | Historical, Action | |
| S E P T E M B E R | 13 | Lady Maiko | Director: Masayuki Suo; Cast: Mone Kamishiraishi, Hiroki Hasegawa, Sumiko Fuji, Tomoko Tabata, Tamiyo Kusakari | Based on a novel. | Drama, Comedy drama, Musical | |
| S E P T E M B E R | 13 | Cardfight!! Vanguard: The Movie | Director: Shin Itagaki, Takashi Motoki; Cast: Tsubasa Yonaga, Takuya Satō, DAIGO, Suzuko Mimori | Based on a novel. | Action, Youth | |
| S E P T E M B E R | 20 | Snow on the Blades | Director: Setsurō Wakamatsu; Cast: Kiichi Nakai, Hiroshi Abe, Ryōko Hirosue, Masahiro Takashima | Based on a novel. | Historical, Drama | |
| S E P T E M B E R | 26 | Fatal Frame: The Movie | Director: Mari Asato; Cast: Ayami Nakajō, Aoi Morikawa, Fujiko Kojima, Karen Miyama | Based on a video game. | Horror | |
| S E P T E M B E R | 27 | Mother | Director: Kazuo Umezu; Cast: Kataoka Ainosuke VI, Kimie Shingyōji | Based on a manga. | Horror | |
| S E P T E M B E R | 27 | Danger Dolls | Director: Shunsuke Tada; Cast: Rumi Hanai, Rina Takeda, Kayano Masuyama, Nana Seino | Based on a television series. | Action, Space opera, Sci-fi | |

=== October – December ===
| Opening | | Title | Cast and crew | Details | Genre(s) | Ref(s) |
|---|---|---|---|---|---|---|
| O C T O B E R | 4 | A Samurai Chronicle | Director: Takashi Koizumi; Cast: Kōji Yakusho, Junichi Okada, Maki Horikita, Mieko Harada, Shinobu Terajima | Based on a novel. | Historical, Drama | |
| O C T O B E R | 11 | Close Range Love | Director: Naoto Kumazawa; Cast: Tomohisa Yamashita, Nana Komatsu, Nozomu Kotaki, Asami Mizukawa, Hirofumi Arai | Based on a manga. | Drama, Romance | |
| O C T O B E R | 11 | Cape Nostalgia | Director: Izuru Narushima; Cast: Ayaka Nanase, Hana Sugisaki, Yō Taichi | Based on a novel. | Drama, Comedy drama | |
| O C T O B E R | 18 | Tada's Do-It-All House: Disconcerto | Director: Tatsushi Ōmori; Cast: Eita, Ryuhei Matsuda, Tasuku Emoto, Manami Honjō, Reiko Kataoka | Based on a novel. | Drama, Comedy | |
| O C T O B E R | 25 | Oh Brother, Oh Sister! | Director: Masafumi Nishida; Cast: Osamu Mukai, Hairi Katagiri, Mizuki Yamamoto, Kumiko Asō | Based on a novel. | Comedy | |
| O C T O B E R | 31 | Bayblues: 25 Years and 354 Days | Director: Tomohiro Takayama; Cast: Kazuki Namioka, Tamiyasu Cho, Natsumi Ogawa, Eri Ishida | Based on a novel. | Comedy | |
| N O V E M B E R | 1 | Clover | Director: Takeshi Furusawa; Cast: Emi Takei, Tadayoshi Okura, Kento Nagayama, Natsuna Watanabe | Based on a manga. | Drama, Romance | |
| N O V E M B E R | 8 | 0.5 mm | Director: Marino Ando; Cast: Sakura Ando, Akira Emoto, Mayu Matsuoka, Yūko Tanaka, Toshio Sakata, Mitsuko Kusabue, Masahiko Tsugawa | Based on a novel. | Drama | |
| N O V E M B E R | 8 | Twilight: Saya in Sasara | Director: Yoshihiro Fukagawa; Cast: Yui Aragaki, Yo Oizumi, Aoi Nakamura, Rila Fukushima | Based on a novel. | Drama, Comedy drama | |
| N O V E M B E R | 15 | Expelled from Paradise | Director: Seiji Mizushima; Cast: Rie Kugimiya, Shin-ichiro Miki, Hiroshi Kamiya, Megumi Hayashibara, Minami Takayama | | Sci-fi, Action | |
| N O V E M B E R | 15 | As the Gods Will | Director: Takashi Miike; Cast: Sota Fukushi, Shōta Sometani, Takayuki Yamada, Mitsuru Fukikoshi | Based on a manga. | Horror, Comedy | |
| N O V E M B E R | 15 | Pale Moon (film) | Director: Daihachi Yoshida; Cast: Rie Miyazawa, Sosuke Ikematsu, Satomi Kobayashi, Yuko Oshima, Seiichi Tanabe | Based on a novel. | Crime, Thriller | |
| N O V E M B E R | 22 | Hibi Rock | Director: Yu Irie; Cast: Shūhei Nomura, Fumi Nikaidō, Tomoya Maeno, Daiichi Watanabe | Based on a manga. | Comedy, Musical | |
| N O V E M B E R | 22 | Miracle: Devil Claus' Love and Magic | Director: Isshin Inudo; Cast: Masaki Aiba, Nana Eikura, Han Hyo-joo, Toma Ikuta, Mantaro Koichi | Based on a novel. | Drama, Comedy, Romance | |
| N O V E M B E R | 29 | Parasyte: Part 1 | Director: Takashi Yamazaki; Cast: Shōta Sometani, Eri Fukatsu, Sadao Abe, Ai Hashimoto | Based on a manga. | Horror, Action | |
| D E C E M B E R | 6 | Space Battleship Yamato 2199: Odyssey of the Celestial Ark | Director: Makoto Bessho; Cast: Daisuke Ono, Eriko Nakamura, Aya Hisakawa, Masato Kokubun, Yuuya Chikaki | Based on a manga. | Sci-fi, Space opera | |
| D E C E M B E R | 6 | The Last: Naruto the Movie | Director: Tsuneo Kobayashi; Cast: Junko Takeuchi, Nana Mizuki, Jun Fukuyama, Chie Nakamura, Showtaro Morikubo | Based on a manga. | Fantasy, Action | |
| D E C E M B E R | 13 | Aikatsu! The Movie | Director: Ryuichi Kimura; Cast: Tsubasa Honda, Masahiro Higashide, Izumi Fujimoto, Yua Shinkawa, Ryo Yoshizawa | Based on a video game. | Romance, Youth | |
| D E C E M B E R | 13 | Ao Haru Ride | Director: Takahiro Miki; Cast: Ryo Narita, Yuina Kuroshima | Based on a manga. | Romance | |
| D E C E M B E R | 20 | The Vancouver Asahi | Director: Yuya Ishii; Cast: Satoshi Tsumabuki, Kazuya Kamenashi, Ryo Katsuji, Yusuke Kamiji | Based on a novel. | Historical, Sports | |
| D E C E M B E R | 20 | Yo-kai Watch: The Movie | Director: Shigeharu Takahashi, Shinji Ushiro; Cast: Haruka Tomatsu, Tomokazu Seki, Etsuko Kozakura, Romi Park, Yūki Kaji | Based on a video game. | Fantasy, Action | |
| D E C E M B E R | 27 | Princess Jellyfish | Director: Taisuke Kawamura; Cast: Rena Nōnen, Masaki Suda, Azusa Babazono, Rina Ōta | Based on a manga. | Comedy | |

== See also ==
- 2014 in Japan
- 2014 in Japanese television
- List of 2014 box office number-one films in Japan
