= 38th Japan Academy Film Prize =

Japanese film awards in 2015

- Date: February 27, 2015
- Site: Grand Prince Hotel New Takanawa, Tokyo, Japan
- Hosted by: Toshiyuki Nishida; Yōko Maki

Highlights
- Best Picture: The Eternal Zero
- Most awards: The Eternal Zero (9)
- Most nominations: Cape Nostalgia (13)

The 38th Japan Academy Film Prize (第38回日本アカデミー賞) is the 38th edition of the Japan Academy Film Prize, an award presented by the Nippon Academy-Sho Association to award excellence in filmmaking. It awarded the best films of 2014 and it took place on February 27, 2015 at the Grand Prince Hotel New Takanawa in Tokyo, Japan.

== Nominees ==
=== Awards ===
Picture of the Year	Animation of the Year
The Eternal Zero; Pale Moon; The Little House; A Samurai Chronicle; Cape Nostalgia	Stand by Me Doraemon; When Marnie Was There; Giovanni's Island; Detective Conan: Dimensional Sniper; Buddha 2: Tezuka Osamu no Buddha - Owarinaki Tabi
Director of the Year	Screenplay of the Year
Takashi Yamazaki – The Eternal Zero; Takashi Koizumi – A Samurai Chronicle; Izuru Narushima – Cape Nostalgia; Katsuhide Motoki – Samurai Hustle; Daihachi Yoshida – Pale Moon	Akihiro Dobashi – Samurai Hustle; Masato Katō and Teruo Abe – Cape Nostalgia; Kaeko Hayafune – Pale Moon; Takashi Yamazaki and Tamio Hayashi – The Eternal Zero; Yoji Yamada and Emiko Hiramatsu – The Little House
Outstanding Performance by an Actor in a Leading Role	Outstanding Performance by an Actress in a Leading Role
Junichi Okada – The Eternal Zero; Hiroshi Abe – Cape Nostalgia; Kuranosuke Sasaki – Samurai Hustle; Kiichi Nakai – Snow on the Blades; Kōji Yakusho – A Samurai Chronicle	Rie Miyazawa – Pale Moon; Sakura Ando – 0.5 mm; Chizuru Ikewaki – The Light Shines Only There; Mao Inoue – The Snow White Murder Case; Fumi Nikaidō – My Man; Sayuri Yoshinaga – Cape Nostalgia
Outstanding Performance by an Actor in a Supporting Role	Outstanding Performance by an Actress in a Supporting Role
Junichi Okada – A Samurai Chronicle; Hiroshi Abe – Snow on the Blades; Hideaki Itō – Wood Job!; Shōfukutei Tsurube – Cape Nostalgia; Haruma Miura – The Eternal Zero	Haru Kuroki – The Little House; Yuko Oshima – Pale Moon; Satomi Kobayashi – Pale Moon; Yūko Takeuchi – Cape Nostalgia; Sumiko Fuji – Lady Maiko
Popularity Award	Newcomer of the Year
Junichi Okada – The Eternal Zero (Actor Category); Rurouni Kenshin (Production Category)	Mone Kamishiraishi – Lady Maiko; Nana Komatsu – The World of Kanako; Rena Nōnen – Hot Road; Sosuke Ikematsu – Pale Moon, Love's Whirlpool, Our Family; Hiroomi Tosaka – Hot Road; Sota Fukushi – In the Hero, As the Gods Will, Say "I Love You".
Outstanding Achievement in Music	Outstanding Achievement in Cinematography
Yoshikazu Suo – Lady Maiko; Takashi Kako – A Samurai Chronicle; Naoki Satō – The Eternal Zero; Joe Hisaishi – The Little House; Gorō Yasukawa – Cape Nostalgia	Kōzō Shibasaki – The Eternal Zero; Shōji Ueda and Hiroyuki Kitazawa – A Samurai Chronicle; Shigumamakoto – Pale Moon; Masashi Chikamori – The Little House; Mutsuo Naganuma – Cape Nostalgia
Outstanding Achievement in Lighting Direction	Outstanding Achievement in Art Direction
Nariyuki Ueda – The Eternal Zero; Hideaki Yamakawa – A Samurai Chronicle; Keita Nishio – Pale Moon; Kōichi Watanabe – The Little House; Takaaki Miyanishi – Cape Nostalgia	Anri Jōjō – The Eternal Zero; Fumio Ogawa – Snow on the Blades; Tadashi Sakai – A Samurai Chronicle; Mitsuo Degawa and Daisuke Sue – The Little House; Yutaka Yokoyama – Cape Nostalgia
Outstanding Achievement in Sound Recording	Outstanding Achievement in Film Editing
Kenichi Fujimoto – The Eternal Zero; Osamu Onodera – Snow on the Blades; Akihiko Kaku and Masahito Yano – Pale Moon; Kazumi Kishida – The Little House; Kenichi Fujimoto – Cape Nostalgia; Masato Yano – A Samurai Chronicle	Ryūji Miyajima – The Eternal Zero; Hideto Aga – A Samurai Chronicle; Iwao Ishii – The Little House; Hideaki Ōhata – Cape Nostalgia; Takashi Satō – Pale Moon
Outstanding Foreign Language Film	Special Award from the Chairman
Frozen; Interstellar; Jersey Boys; Fury; Godzilla	Akira Suzuki (Editor); Norifumi Suzuki (Director); Fujio Morita (Cinematographer); Yoshiko Yamaguchi (Actress); Bunta Sugawara (Actor)
Special Award from the Association	
Kazumi Ōsaka (Decorator); Tsuneo Soga (Hairdresser); Masashi Tara (Sound Technician)	
