= List of drama films of the 2010s =

This is a list of drama films of the 2010s.

== 2010 ==
- 127 Hours
- Black Bread
- Black Swan
- Certified Copy
- Curitiba Zero Grau
- The Disappearance of Haruhi Suzumiya
- The Fighter
- For Colored Girls
- Harry Potter and the Deathly Hallows – Part 1
- How To Train Your Dragon
- Kandahar
- The King's Speech
- My Name Is Khan
- The Social Network
- Winter's Bone
- Yuriko's Aroma

== 2011 ==
- 50/50
- Albert Nobbs
- Answers to Nothing
- The Artist
- The Descendants
- Extremely Loud & Incredibly Close
- The Girl with the Dragon Tattoo
- Harry Potter and the Deathly Hallows – Part 2
- The Help
- Hugo
- I Melt with You
- The Ides of March
- The Iron Lady
- Margin Call
- Melancholia
- Moneyball
- My Week with Marilyn
- One Day
- Real Steel
- Shame
- The Strange Thing About the Johnsons
- Take Shelter
- Toomelah
- The Tree of Life
- War Horse
- Warrior

== 2012 ==
- All Apologies
- Anna Karenina
- Arbitrage
- Argo
- Beasts of the Southern Wild
- Chasing Mavericks
- Cloud Atlas
- The Dark Knight Rises
- Django Unchained
- End of Watch
- Flight
- Get the Gringo
- Good Deeds
- Hitchcock
- The Hunger Games
- The Impossible
- Jack Reacher
- Killing Them Softly
- The Kirishima Thing
- Life of Pi
- Lincoln
- The Lucky One
- Magic Mike
- The Master
- Moonrise Kingdom
- Mud
- No
- The Odd Life of Timothy Green
- People Like Us
- The Perks of Being a Wallflower
- Promised Land
- Rock of Ages
- A Royal Affair
- The Sessions
- Silver Linings Playbook
- Smashed
- Sparkle
- Sue, Mai & Sawa: Righting the Girl Ship
- Trouble with the Curve
- The Unspeakable Act
- Won't Back Down
- The Words

== 2013 ==
- 42
- At Any Price
- Avenged
- The Best Plan Is No Plan
- The Bling Ring
- Blue Jasmine
- Bozo
- Devdas
- El hijo de Hernández
- Endless Love
- Feed Me
- Fruitvale Station
- The Great Gatsby
- The House at the End of Time
- Locke
- Now You See Me
- Nymphomaniac
- The Place Beyond the Pines
- Romeo & Juliet
- Temptation: Confessions of a Marriage Counselor
- These Final Hours
- Trance
- The Ultimate Task
- Veer!
- Walking with Dinosaurs
- White Rabbit
- The Wolf of Wall Street

== 2014 ==
- The Atticus Institute
- The Babadook
- The Badger Game
- Bitter Love
- Body
- The Boundary
- Buzzard
- Cape Nostalgia
- Climbing to Spring
- Close Range Love
- The Corpse of Anna Fritz
- Dark Was the Night
- Digging Up the Marrow
- The Drop
- Echoes
- Forever Love
- Forever Young
- The Galaxy on Earth
- A Girl Walks Home Alone at Night
- God's Pocket
- Honeymoon
- Head Full of Honey
- House Keeping
- How to Train Your Dragon 2
- The Imitation Game
- The Intruders
- Late Phases
- Maps to the Stars
- The Mirror
- Monsters: Dark Continent
- My Man
- Pale Moon
- Perfect Beyond
- Pride
- The Quiet Hour
- (Sex) Appeal
- Sorry, I Love You
- Tokyo Tribe
- The Two Faces of January
- The Vancouver Asahi
- The Vatican Tapes
- Where the Devil Hides
- Whiplash
- Who Is Undercover
- Who Moved My Dream
- Wonderful World End
- Z Nation

== 2015 ==
- 10 Days in a Madhouse
- 12 Citizens
- Anomalisa
- April Fools
- Attack on Titan
- Bare
- The Big Short
- Biri Gal
- The Boy
- The Case of Hana & Alice
- C'est si bon
- Daughter of God
- Digging Up the Marrow
- Ex Machina
- Excess Flesh
- The Revenant
- Families
- Faults
- Hangman
- He Never Died
- The Hitch-Hiker
- The House on Pine Street
- Jogo de Damas
- Kakekomi
- Kaze ni Tatsu Lion
- Komban
- La La La at Rock Bottom
- The Lead Singer and Dancer and His Woman
- Lost in Wrestling
- Lost River
- Lotus Code
- Maestro!
- Moor
- Mountain Cry
- One & Two
- The Queens
- Reichsführer-SS
- San Andreas
- Scratch
- The Sisterhood of Night
- Spotlight
- Victor Frankenstein
- Voice from the Stone
- The Witch
- The Woman in Black: Angel of Death

== 2016 ==
- Aozora Yell
- Tenshi ni I'm Fine
- South of 8

== 2017 ==
- Bully
- Logan
- Love All You Have Left
- Octav
- Rings

== 2018 ==
- I Can Only Imagine
- Revolt
- Giant Little Ones

== 2019 ==
- Bombshell
- Waves

== See also ==
- List of drama films of the 1990s
- List of drama films of the 2020s
