= Thermae Romae (film) =

- Teaser poster
- Directed by: Hideki Takeuchi
- Written by: Shōgo Mutō
- Produced by: Chihiro Kameyama; Minami Ichikawa; Atsushi Terada; Hirokazu Hamamura
- Starring: Hiroshi Abe; Aya Ueto; Kazuki Kitamura; Riki Takeuchi; Kai Shishido; Takashi Sasano; Masachika Ichimura
- Cinematography: Kazunari Kawagoe
- Edited by: Hiroshi Matsuo
- Music by: Norihito Sumimoto
- Production companies: Fuji Television; Toho; Dentsu; Enterbrain
- Distributed by: Toho
- Release dates: April 28, 2012 (JPN); September 6, 2012 (TIFF)
- Running time: 108 minutes
- Country: Japan
- Language: Japanese
- Box office: $75.4 million

Thermae Romae is a 2012 live-action film adaptation of Japanese manga Thermae Romae, which was produced by Fuji TV and it released on April 28, 2012. A second film, Thermae Romae II, was released in 2014.

== Plot ==
During the reign of Hadrian, architect and thermae engineer Lucius Modestus laments the squalid and crowded state of Roman Baths. While submerging himself in a bath, he discovers a hidden tunnel leading to a modern Japanese bathhouse. He believes the bathhouse to be the slaves' private bath, but is invigorated by the modern conveniences he finds there: running taps, a painting of Mount Fuji, and refrigerated drinks, the latter of which brings him to tears of joy as he is transported back to Rome. Inspired, he begins to install similar features into Roman baths. When he is teleported to Japan a second time, he finds himself in a private bathroom, where he meets Satsuki Odate, a 28-year-old Japanese woman and aspiring manga artist. He is transported back to Rome as he cries after accidentally spraying his eyes with an aerosol.

Lucius is invited to the villa of Emperor Hadrian, who commissions him to construct a private bath. After teleporting to Satsuki's workplace, a bathroom showroom, Lucius cries as he uses an automatic bidet. Hadrian is impressed by the jacuzzi Lucius builds for him. Lucius falls into a depression after discovering his wife's affair with his best friend, but returns to Hadrian's employ to create a habitat for a Nile crocodile the Emperor believes to be the reincarnation of his deceased lover Antinous. Satsuki, having returned to her rural hometown after being fired, shows a coin Lucius gave her in exchange for information about her local zoo to a professor friend of her grandfather. He confirms it to be a genuine Roman coin, and carbon-dates a toga Lucius had discarded to the First Century. Satsuki is enamoured with Lucius and begins learning Latin.

Hadrian explains to Lucius that he plans to make Ceionius his heir, and commissions Lucius to build a bath in his name. While visiting the site, Lucius is attacked by an envious architect and falls into a well, where he is transported to Satsuki. She heals his wounds in an onsen, but the two fall into the water and are both transported back to Rome. Ceionius tries to assault Satsuki, but Antoninus defends her. Abhorred by Ceionius' behaviour, Lucius refuses to build Ceionius a bath, incurring Hadrian's wrath. Satsuki explains to Lucius that if Hadrian does not make Antoninus his heir over Ceionius, he will be remembered as a foolish and ill-tempered emperor. Hoping to preserve his Hadrian's good name, Lucius consents to build a medical bath on the banks of the Danube for soldiers' use.

The bath restores the soldiers' morale. Lucius tells Hadrian it was Antoninus' idea to restore his place in the line of succession. Satsuki confesses her feelings to Lucius and, although he does not return her feelings, he thanks her for supporting him in his efforts. As she cries, she begins to disappear as she is transported back to the present day; Lucius comforts her by saying they will meet again as "all roads lead to Rome".

Back in Japan, Satsuki successfully pitches a Manga series based on her experiences to a publisher. As she walks over a bridge in Tokyo, she is happy to find Lucius as he emerges from the water.

== Cast ==
- Hiroshi Abe as Lucius
- Aya Ueto as Mami Yamakoshi
- Kazuki Kitamura as Ceionius
- Riki Takeuchi as Tateno
- Kai Shishido as Antoninus
- Takashi Sasano as Shūzo Yamakoshi
- Masachika Ichimura as Hadrian
- Midoriko Kimura as Yumi Yamakoshi
- Katsuya as Marcus

== Reception ==
As of July 29, the film had a box office gross of US$74,091,903. It was the second highest-grossing domestic film at the Japanese box office in 2012 and, as of January 5, 2015, is the 95th highest-grossing film in Japan, with ¥5.98 billion.

Hiroshi Abe won Outstanding Performance by an Actor in a Leading Role for the film at the 36th Japan Academy Film Prize presentation. Thermae Romae also received a nomination for Mitsuo Harada's art direction at the same awards.

Thermae Romae earned HK$1,498,789 at the Hong Kong box office.

The film had its North American premiere in September 2012 at the Toronto International Film Festival.
