= List of samurai films of the 2010s =

A list of Samurai films released in the 2010s.

Title	Director	Cast	Release date	Notes
13 Assassins			2010	
47 Ronin			2013	
Hara-Kiri: Death of a Samurai			2011	
The Last Ronin			2010	
Snow on the Blades			2010	
Sword of Desperation			2010	
Unforgiven			2013	
Zatoichi the Last			2010	
