= Kyoko Nakajima =

Japanese writer

- 中島 京子
- Born: March 23, 1964 (age 62); Suginami, Tokyo, Japan
- Education: Tokyo Woman's Christian University
- Occupations: Novelist, essayist
- Writing career
- Language: Japanese
- Genres: Fiction, essay
- Notable works: Chiisai ouchi (小さいおうち); Tsuma ga shiitake datta koro (妻が椎茸だったころ); Katazuno (かたずの)
- Notable awards: Naoki Prize; Izumi Kyōka Prize for Literature; Shibata Renzaburo Prize; Kawai Hayao Story Prize

Kyoko Nakajima (中島 京子, Nakajima Kyōko; born March 23, 1964) is a Japanese writer. She has won the Naoki Prize, Izumi Kyōka Prize for Literature, Shibata Renzaburo Prize, Kawai Hayao Story Prize, and Chuo Koron Literary Prize, and her work has been adapted for film.

== Early life and education ==
Kyoko Nakajima was born in Suginami, Tokyo, Japan to parents who worked as university professors and translators of French literature. Her father was a professor at Chuo University, while her mother was a professor at Meiji University. Nakajima attended Tokyo Woman's Christian University.

== Career ==
After graduating from university, she worked for several years in publishing as an editor at Ray, Cawaii!, and other lifestyle magazines. In 1996 she quit her job to spend a year in the United States, and upon her return to Japan in 1997 she began a new career as a freelance writer.

While Nakajima worked on projects for clients, she was also working on several fiction manuscripts of her own. Her debut novel Futon, which refers to work of the same name by Katai Tayama, was published in 2003 and immediately nominated for the 2003 Noma Literary New Face Prize, but did not win. Around the time that Futon was published, Nakajima's father was diagnosed with dementia. For over a decade, until his death in 2013, Nakajima helped take care of her father while producing her novels and essays. She later drew on this experience to write her 2015 novel Nagai owakare (The Long Goodbye).

Nakajima followed Futon with two more novels and six short story collections, and in 2009 she received a grant from the University of Iowa Center for Asian and Pacific Studies to support a residency at the International Writing Program. In 2010 her novel Chiisai ouchi (The Little House) received the 143rd Naoki Prize, one of Japan's highest literary honors. It was later adapted into the 2014 film Chiisai Ouchi, directed by Yoji Yamada and starring Haru Kuroki.

Subsequent work received several more awards. Tsuma ga shiitake datta koro (When My Wife was a Shiitake) won the 42nd Izumi Kyōka Prize for Literature in 2014. Katazuno (One-Horn) won both the 2015 Shibata Renzaburo Prize and the 2015 Kawai Hayao Story Prize, while Nagai owakare (The Long Goodbye) won the 2015 Chuo Koron Literary Prize. In 2017 Darf Publishers acquired the rights to the English translation of Chiisai ouchi.

Nakajima regularly writes opinion essays on culture and politics for Mainichi Shimbun. In 2017, in response to media coverage of the Me Too movement, Nakajima revealed her own experiences with sexual harassment in the publishing industry.

== Writing style ==
Nakajima bases many of her settings and characters on her own personal experiences, such as caring for a parent with dementia, as in Nagai owakare, or dealing with a youthful sibling, as in Kirihatake no endan. Ian McCullough MacDonald, one of Nakajima's English translators, describes her writing as "deceptively simple prose."

== Recognition ==
- 2010 143rd Naoki Prize (2010上) for Chiisai ouchi (The Little House)
- 2014 42nd Izumi Kyōka Prize for Literature for Tsuma ga shiitake datta koro (When My Wife Was a Shiitake)
- 2015 Shibata Renzaburo Prize for Katazuno (One-Horn)
- 2015 Kawai Hayao Story Prize for Katazuno (One-Horn)
- 2015 Chuo Koron Literary Prize for Nagai owakare (The Long Goodbye)

== Film adaptations ==
- Chiisai Ouchi (The Little House), 2014

== Bibliography ==
=== Books in Japanese ===
- Futon, Kodansha, 2003, ISBN 9784062118934
- Itō no koi (Ito's Love), Kodansha, 2005, ISBN 9784062127776
- Tsua 1989 (Tour 1989), Shueisha, 2006, ISBN 9784087748123
- Koko Makkarīna no tsukue, Shueisha, 2006, ISBN 9784087460339
- Heisei daikazoku (One Big Family in the Heisei Era), Shueisha, 2008, ISBN 9784087712032
- E/N/Ji/N (Misanthropus), Kadokawa Shoten, 2009 ISBN 9784048739306
- Jochutan (Maids' Tales), Asahi Shinbun, 2009, ISBN 9784022506276
- Eruninyo (El Niño), Kodansha, 2010, ISBN 9784062166416
- Kirihatake no endan, Shueisha, 2010, ISBN 9784087465624
- Noronoro aruke, Bungeishunju, 2012, ISBN 9784163816302
- Tsuma ga shiitake datta koro (When My Wife was a Shiitake), Kodansha, 2013, ISBN 9784062185134
- Katazuno (One-Horn), Shueisha, 2014, ISBN 9784087715705
- Nagai owakare (The Long Goodbye), Bungeishunju, 2015, ISBN 9784163902654
- Pasutisu : otona no arisu to sangatsu usagi no ochakai (Pastis), Chikuma Shobo, 2016, ISBN 9784480804556
- Kanojo ni kansuru jūnishō(12 Chapter About Her), Chuo Koron Shinsha, 2016, ISBN 9784120048449
- Gosuto (Ghost), Asahi Shimbun, 2017, ISBN 9784022514837
- Yasashii neko(Kind Cat), Chuo Koron Shinsha, 2021, ISBN 9784120054556

=== Selected works and books in English ===
- "Go, Japanese!" Granta 114, March 15, 2011
- "Things Remembered and Things Forgotten," English trans. Ian McCullough MacDonald, Granta 127, April 24, 2014
- "When My Wife Was a Shiitake," English trans. Ginny Tapley Takemori, Words Without Borders, March 2015 issue
- "The Little House'', English trans. Ginny Tapley Takemori, Darf Publishing, 2019
- "Things Remembered and Things Forgotten," trans. Ginny Tapley Takemori and Ian McCullough MacDonald, Sort Of Books 2021

== See also ==
- List of Japanese women writers
