= Repatriation of Japanese from South Sakhalin and the Kuril Islands =

After World War II, there was a mass repatriation of the Japanese, Ainu, and, to some extent, the Korean population of the Southern Sakhalin and the Kuril Islands, which were ceded to the USSR from Japan. Japan did not accept mixed Japanese-Korean families. Between 1946 and 1966 (in two stages), approximately 283,320 people wished to repatriate from the Sakhalin Oblast to Japan, including over 8,000 prisoners of war and approximately 17,000 Japanese residents of the Kuril Islands. Before the end of the war, approximately 142,000 people either left Karafuto voluntarily or were evacuated by the Japanese authorities before their capitulation to the USSR. This right to remain was exercised by some members of mixed Japanese-Korean and Japanese-Slavic families, as well as numerous individuals of Korean nationality who had been rendered stateless as a result of the Japanese government's unilateral denunciation of its obligations to residents of the former Japanese Korea. Written statements expressing their desire to remain in the USSR were submitted by 469 adult citizens of Japan, and 187 children under the age of 16 also remained with them. At the same time, individuals suspected of sabotage and damage to property were immediately deported. During the repatriation, complaints, instances of abuse of power, bribery, and other forms of local corruption were noted.

== Background ==
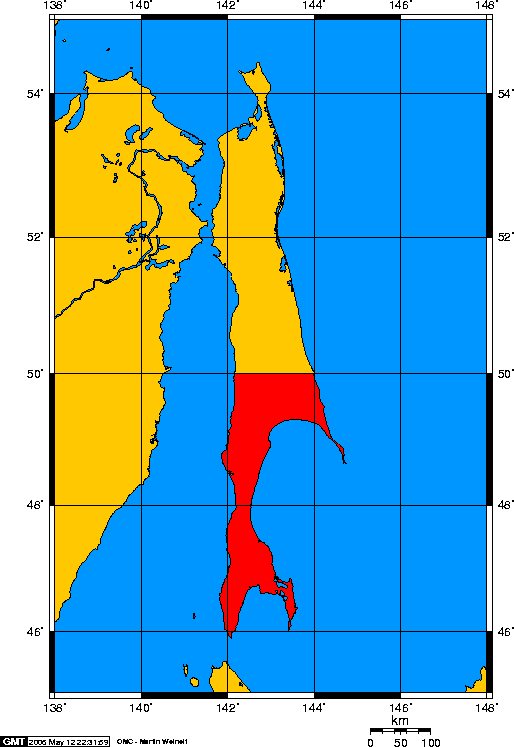
Over 260,000 people were repatriated from the former Karafuto to Japan by Soviet authorities. Approximately 142,000 left the island before the end of the Soviet-Japanese War.

Before the arrival of the Russians and Japanese, southern Sakhalin and the Kuril Islands were inhabited by the Ainu. In the 17th century, reports of the islands' existence began to reach Russia and Japan. From the 18th to the first half of the 19th century, the two countries actively explored the islands, but concluded no treaties or agreements. Finally, in 1855, the two countries signed the Treaty of Shimoda, which defined the border between Russia and Japan on the Kuril Islands at the Vries Strait, while Sakhalin remained undivided. In 1875, the Treaty of Saint Petersburg was signed, granting the Kuril Islands north of the Vries Strait to the Japanese Empire, while Sakhalin became part of the Russian Empire.

Until the early 20th century, the Kuril Islands were inhabited primarily by the Ainu, who were engaged in fishing. Active Japanese settlement of the islands began before the Russo-Japanese War and continued until the end of World War II. By 1945, the civilian population of the Kuril Islands (Chishima rettō) was approximately 18,000 people, employed in fishing.

Southern Sakhalin was ceded to Japan following Russia's defeat in the Russo-Japanese War. After acquiring this territory, Japan actively colonized it. While the population in 1907 was 48,000, by 1925 it was over 200,000, and by 1941, the prefecture's population exceeded 400,000. The prefecture's population was employed in the fishing, coal, pulp and paper, forestry, and transportation industries.

== World War II ==
In the final stages of World War II, the USSR entered military action against Japan, with whom it had maintained a policy of neutrality until 8 August 1945. During the Yalta and Potsdam Conferences, the Allies confirmed the USSR's rights to the southern part of Sakhalin and the Kuril Islands. On 11 August 1945, Soviet troops began the South Sakhalin Offensive Operation, and on 18 August, the Kuril islands Landing Operation. By 1 September, military operations had concluded, and South Sakhalin and all the Kuril Islands came under the jurisdiction of the USSR.

== Repatriation of the Japanese population ==
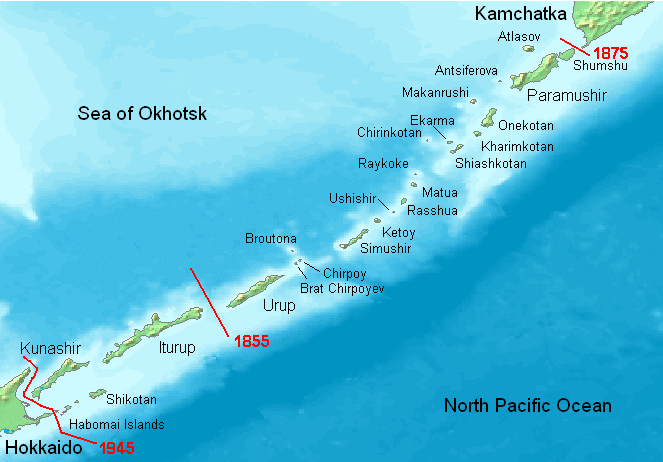
About 17,000 people were repatriated from the Kuril Islands to Japan after the end of the war.

In January 1946, Douglas MacArthur, Commander-in-Chief of the US occupation forces in Japan, issued two directives: the first ordered the repatriation of Japanese citizens from Southern Sakhalin and the Kuril Islands, while the second stipulated that the Southern Kuril Islands were excluded from Japanese jurisdiction. This served as the basis for the repatriation of Japanese citizens from Southern Sakhalin and the Kuril Islands.

According to the NKVD and NKGB of the USSR from 26 January 1946, 391,000 people lived in Southern Sakhalin before the outbreak of hostilities, of which 286,000 lived in 14 cities and 105,000 in rural areas. With the onset of hostilities, approximately 40,000 people (women and children) were evacuated to Hokkaido. According to the Sakhalin Regional Committee, more than 102,000 people left the island before the end of the war. Hundreds of villages were abandoned, and approximately 70,000 refugees accumulated in the cities in the south of the island. They were returned to their permanent places of residence within two months, but tens of thousands more remained in the forests and mountains, hiding from Soviet troops. According to data from the USSR Ministry of Internal Affairs from 22 October 1946, 339,986 people were registered in southern Sakhalin—65,400 Russians and 274,586 Japanese, Koreans, Chinese, and Ainu. The repatriation took place in two stages: the first (October 1946 – May 1948) involved the deportation of the civilian population, while the second (1957–1960) involved the deportation of specialists.

A schedule for the deportation of the Japanese population was approved for each district for the entire repatriation period, with two weeks' notice of departure. Repatriates were being transported at a rate of 30,000 per month. Immediately before being sent to Hokkaido, they were delivered to Transit Camp No. 379 in Kholmsk. From there, they were transferred to Camp No. 380 in Nakhodka, and from there, aboard Soviet, American, and Japanese ships, to Japan. Lists of repatriates were compiled at enterprises and institutions, reviewed by local councils, the Ministry of Internal Affairs, and the Ministry of State Security, and then approved by repatriation commissions. Upon departure, civilians were allowed to take with them up to 100 kg of personal belongings per head of household, 50 kg per family member, and up to 1,000 yen. Prisoners of war were allowed to take with them personal belongings equal to their carry-on baggage, up to 200 yen for soldiers, and 500 yen for officers. In addition, they were allowed to take personal financial documents payable in Japan, but were prohibited from exporting Japanese and Soviet currency and gold.

Due to Japanese sabotage, Soviet authorities accelerated deportations: notification of departures was given no earlier than 24 hours in advance, monetary settlements were prepared secretly and carried out without delay, and people who aroused Soviet suspicion were deported immediately.

=== Eviction procedure ===
The order of deportation was as follows:

- Business managers and owners, officials, some intellectuals, and employees with family members in Japan who had been deported at the beginning of the war
- Workers in factories, workshops, stock exchange employees, and companies
- Farmers and rural employees
- Doctors, teachers, engineers, and other specialists, and clergy

In June and July 1949, all Japanese citizens were deported from Sakhalin Oblast, except those who submitted written statements expressing their unwillingness to leave. After the repatriation of the majority of willing Japanese citizens was completed by 10 June 1949, 469 former adult Japanese citizens, along with 187 children under 16, expressed their desire to remain on the island. It is noteworthy that the number of Japanese who voluntarily remained in the USSR (656 people) was almost twice the number of Russian old settlers who wished to remain in Karafuto in 1905 (although, proportionally to the entire Russian population in 1905, 1% of Russians decided to remain under Japanese rule, while of the Japanese in 1945, only 0.16% expressed a desire to remain under Soviet rule). In addition, 287 convicted or repressed Japanese continued to remain on Sakhalin, the last of whom was to serve a prison sentence until 1974. For example, the Japanese owners of a pasta factory in Yuzhno-Kurilsk wished to remain, having submitted a statement of allegiance to Soviet power. Japanese citizens in mixed Japanese-Korean and Japanese-Slavic marriages often wished to remain in the USSR. Some people also did not leave due to health reasons. Between 1946 and 1949, 272,335 Japanese civilians and 8,303 prisoners of war were repatriated from the region. Between 1957 and 1959 and 1964 and 1966, 2,682 former Japanese citizens who, for various reasons, did not leave in the first stage were sent home.

=== The remaining ===
The fates of the Japanese who remained in Russia have unfolded in various ways. For example, in 2004, Sokichi Nishiyama (died in 2005) was elected mayor of the Tomarinsky District, the first ethnic Japanese to ever hold such a position in Russia. Sokichi was born in the village of Koni, Honto County, Karafuto Prefecture (later Shebunino, Nevelsky District, Sakhalin Oblast), to a large farming family (Sokiti's parents moved to Sakhalin from "greater" Japan in 1936), where he was the seventh child. After the annexation of South Sakhalin to the USSR in August–September 1945, Sokichi's parents refused to evacuate to Japan and remained on the island. After serving in the army, Nishiyama graduated from the Yuzhno-Sakhalinsk State Pedagogical Institute with a degree in geography teaching and taught in schools on Sakhalin.

== Repatriation of the Korean population ==
The Korean population found itself in a more difficult situation. The issue of returning to South Korea, where the majority of Koreans originated, was particularly pressing. After the Soviet occupation of southern Sakhalin, over 47,000 Koreans remained on the island. Japan no longer considered Koreans its subjects, and returning to Korea was also impossible. Korea was devastated and divided. After the formation of the DPRK in 1948, North Korean consuls campaigned among Sakhalin Koreans for new DPRK citizenship and subsequent resettlement to the North. In 1958–1959, 6,346 people accepted DPRK citizenship, of whom 5,096 moved to the North. Soviet citizenship was granted to 6,414 people. However, the "transition" became increasingly difficult with each passing year; the DPRK authorities insisted on issuing North Korean passports to all Sakhalin Koreans. The overwhelming majority remained stateless because they wanted to move to South Korea, with which the USSR had no diplomatic relations.

== Consequences ==
Japanese repatriates from Karafuto and the Kuril Islands mostly headed to nearby Hokkaido. They simply lacked the resources for longer journeys. The massive influx of repatriates to Hokkaido forced Japan to begin importing American foodstuffs to supply the northern island, making the Japanese economy dependent on the United States. In the Sakhalin Oblast, the mass exodus of the Japanese population, most of whom wished to live within Japan's borders, caused an acute labor shortage. In response, Soviet authorities initiated the process of granting Soviet citizenship to the remaining ethnic Koreans.

== Settlement by Soviet population ==
As Japanese nationals and North Korean citizens were repatriated, Soviet citizens arrived in southern Sakhalin and the Kuril Islands. While there were 70,000 Soviet residents by October 1946, by 1949 their number had already increased to over 450,000. Along with addressing the complex challenges of settling and developing the region's economy, social issues were also being actively addressed. Between 1946 and 1948 alone, 584 schools, 101 kindergartens, 8 specialized secondary schools, more than 570 medical and cultural institutions, over 600 stores, bakeries, and cafeterias, and many other social institutions were built and opened. Housing construction was also actively underway.

== In art ==
=== Cinema ===
- Giovanni's Island

=== In fiction ===
- Blue Sea, White Steamboat (Синее море, белый пароход) a novel by Gennady Mashkin

== See also ==
- Japanese prisoners of war in the Soviet Union
- Evacuation of Finnish Karelia
- Evacuation of East Prussia
