= Kyō no Kira-kun =

Manga

- Cover of the first manga volume

きょうのキラ君
- Genre: Drama, Romance
- Manga
- Written by: Rin Mikimoto
- Published by: Kodansha
- Magazine: Bessatsu Friend
- Original run: 13 January 2012 – 11 August 2014
- Volumes: 9
- Live-action film
- Directed by: Taisuke Kawamura
- Released: 25 February 2017

Kyō no Kira-kun (きょうのキラ君; "Today's Kira-kun") is a Japanese shōjo manga series written and illustrated by Rin Mikimoto. It is published by Kodansha on Bessatsu Friend. The first volume was published on 13 January 2012. A live-action adaptation was released on February 25, 2017.

== Plot ==
Ninon Okamura is an introverted high schoolgirl who cannot talk with anyone other than her parents and Kansai dialect-speaking pet parrot, Sensei, due to the trauma of being bullied when she was in elementary school. However, her life changes when her mother requests her to befriend her next-door neighbor and classmate, Yuiji Kira, who suffers from a heart disease and likely only has one year left to live. Ninon encourages Kira to abandon his lewd lifestyle and instead fill his life with happiness, vowing to always remain on his side. The two become fast friends and ultimately fall for each other, though both are aware that their relationship likely has no future.

In the meantime, Ninon and Kira's relationship is rocked by several events, including Kira's brief relationship with the school nurse, Mio Shitara, who seeks solace after her fiancé's death; Kira's estrangement from his tsundere friend Kazuhiro Yabe who once became the ringleader of Ninon's bullies until he humbles himself and falls in love with her; as well as Kira's ambiguous relationship with Rei Uchida, although she is revealed to be testing Ninon's resolve, as she does not like indecisive people, and later befriends her after the misunderstanding is cleared. Yabe and Rei later develop feelings for each other and become a couple.

As time goes on, Kira's illness grows worse and he must travel overseas for medication that can cure it. While his illness ultimately subsides after several tense months, the Kira family is left in great debt and have to move to Osaka to find work, separating Kira from Ninon just as the two are reunited. Meanwhile, Sensei grows a tumor and loses his ability to talk, ultimately dying a few months after Kira's return. Ninon's depression is prevented, though, with a video recorded by Sensei telling her to lift her head and move on with her life.

Several years afterward, Ninon and Kira are shown visiting Tokyo Tower with their son, who speaks in the Kansai dialect.

== Characters ==
Ninon Okamura (岡村 ニノン, Okamura Ninon)
Played by: Marie Iitoyo
The series' main protagonist. Ninon is part-French through her mother; her name alludes to ninon, a French word for woven fabric. She is a beautiful but introverted high school student who is unable to talk to anyone except her own parents and talking pet parrot, Sensei, due to a history of bullying that left a scar on her forehead, which she initially hides using her bangs. However, she is able to open up when she is tasked by her mother to keep an eye on her neighbor and classmate, Yuiji Kira, who is sick of a heart disease. Through time, Ninon eventually falls in love with him, a feeling that is reciprocated, yet is forced to watch him endure through his sickness until he is successfully treated overseas. However, just as Kira has returned for her, Sensei develops a tumor, an illness that he does not recover from. She is encouraged by Sensei's pre-recorded video, though, to keep her spirits up and temporarily lets Kira go to support his father in Osaka. In the epilogue, it is shown that Ninon and Kira are married and have a son who speaks in the Kansai dialect, just like Sensei.
Yuiji Kira (吉良 ゆいじ, Kira Yuiji)
Played by: Taishi Nakagawa
Ninon's next-door neighbor and classmate, Kira is sick of a heart disease that gives him only a short life expectancy, a chance that is further reduced by his initially lewd and daring lifestyle. Due to this, he feels lonely and likes to retreat at Tokyo Tower, until Ninon approaches and encourages him to fill his life with happiness, even if it may be short. Since then, he becomes close to Ninon and eventually falls for her, but is constantly reminded that his short life means that Ninon will eventually be left to grieve for him. Despite his "cool" exterior, Kira is actually very emotional and prone to cry, especially whenever Ninon puts up a brave face to face her concern about his illness. Later, Kira discovers a way to cure his disease overseas, which, while long and winding, does indeed cure him, although it leaves his family in great debt, forcing him to work in Osaka and separating him from Ninon yet again for a while. In the epilogue, Kira is seen visiting Tokyo Tower with Ninon and their son.
Sensei (先生)
Ninon's talking pet parrot who becomes her constant companion and friend. He was discovered by Ninon dying at the streets after being abused by a human and attacked by crows before he was subsequently rushed to a veterinarian. A few days after, Sensei suddenly gained the ability to talk; with it, he promised to Ninon that he will always accompany her no matter what. Ninon disguises him as a doll towards her classmates for most of the series, though his secret is eventually found out by Kira and Yabe. Sensei is flamboyant and speaks in the Kansai dialect. He is also jealous of Ninon's friendship and eventual romantic relationship with Kira. Near the end of the series, Sensei develops a tumor and loses his ability to talk. This illness ultimately leads to his death. He manages to create a pre-recorded video for Ninon beforehand, telling her to move forward and be compassionate as well as not grieve for him anymore.
The film adaptation cuts Sensei's role, instead relegating him to an ordinary parrot who constantly praises Ninon with "You're awesome!". He also lives all the way to the end of the film.
Kazuhiro Yabe (矢部 和弘, Yabe Kazuhiro)
Played by: Shōno Hayama
Kira's best friend who is in the same class as Ninon and Kira. Back when he was in middle school, he was bullied for being an otaku who has an interest in drawing manga, but was saved by Kira, who helped him break through his shy attitude. Yabe then transformed into a tsundere individual and would express constant mood swings and sentiments that are contrary to what he usually feels. At first, he bullies Ninon due to her introverted nature, but in the process has his friendship with Kira broken when the latter stands up for her. Despite this, he tries to make amends with Kira and develops feelings for Ninon, though he ultimately wants her and Kira to be happy by staying together. Later, Yabe also takes an interest in Rei, though the two's difficult personalities send their relationship through a rocky path before solidifying at the end. In the epilogue, it is shown that Yabe has successfully send his manga to a publisher after several failed attempts.
In the film adaptation, Yabe is considerably calmer and does not bully or fall in love with Ninon like in the manga.
Rei Uchida (内田 澪, Uchida Rei)
Played by: Yuna Taira
A friend of Kira who was hospitalized in the same ward in middle school. She later enrolled in the same school as Ninon and Kira, but took the separate science program. She is elegant and beautiful but is quiet, sneaky, and somewhat a sociopath, having a hobby of bullying people whom she thinks do not speak up enough; this attitude costs her her chance to make friends. While she has no feelings for Kira, Rei at first pretends to be his ex-girlfriend to Ninon and bullies her into breaking up with him, but when Ninon shows resolve on her relationship, she apologizes and congratulates her. Rei is later shown to be one of Ninon's best friends and slowly develops a relationship with Yabe, though it goes a rocky path due to both parties' difficult personalities. Later, she transfers to a different school to accommodate her singing commitments, becoming a record-selling artist by the epilogue.
The film adaptation changes Rei's surname to "Yahagi" (矢作). Unlike in the manga, she studies in a separate high school from Ninon, Kira, and Yabe since the very beginning.
Tiara (ティアラ)
Played by: Kōki Okada
Kira's cross-dressing father. He is left a single father after his wife died giving birth to Kira, only to find out that his son has an illness that gives him only several years of life expectancy. To pay for Kira's medication, he works at an okama bar while putting up a drag and donning the name "Tiara". Tiara is friends with Ninon's mother and is the one who requests Ninon to befriend Kira and make him happy. Later, Tiara is forced to sell his house and find work in Osaka to pay for Kira's overseas medication, which separates the Kira family from the Okamura family for several years.
In the film adaptation, Kira's father does not crossdress or work at an okama bar, instead appearing to be an ordinary office worker.
Mio Shitara
A young nurse who works at Ninon and Kira's school. She lost her fiance due to an accident, sending her into a depressed state enough for her to seek solace on Kira, even though she is fully aware about his illness and the fact that their relationship grew on shallow grounds. The two ultimately decide to amicably end their relationship while celebrating Kira's 17th birthday.
Shitara does not appear in the film adaptation.
Takahiro (岡村 隆弘, Okamura Takahiro) and Kanon Okamura (岡村 かのん, Okamura Kanon)
Played by: Ken Yasuda (Takahiro) and Rieko Miura (Kanon)
Ninon's parents. Takahiro is a bespectacled "ordinary man" who is said to look so mesmerizing whenever he takes out his glasses once per year. Kanon, meanwhile, is half-French and a cosplay otaku, frequently dressing up in stereotypical anime/manga personalities, such as a maid, schoolgirl, and miko. Kanon is friends with Tiara and is requested by him to inform Ninon to befriend Kira. She fully supports their growing relationship, but it is revealed that her husband is kept in the dark and initially rejects it, although his daughter and Kira are able to court him into accepting.
Hyakuta and Ikigoma
Ninon's classmates and later friends. The two are initially distant with Ninon thanks to her introverted attitude, but when she opens up, the three quickly befriend. The two support Ninon's relationship with Kira and are somewhat jealous of her friendship with Rei.
The two do not appear in the film adaptation.
Yuki Yabe
Yabe's older sister who works as a manager at a modeling company. Yuki is shown to hilariously repress and intimidate Yabe all the time and likes to give him orders, such as washing her hair every morning and buying supplies.
Yuki does not appear in the film adaptation.

== Reception ==
Volume 1 reached the 25th place on the Japanese weekly manga chart, and, as of 15 January 2012, has sold 18,537 copies. Volume 2 reached the 23rd place and, as of 15 April 2012, has sold 27,310 copies. Volume 3 reached the 15th place and, as of 23 September 2012, has sold 61,839 copies. Volume 4 reached the 16th place and, as of 20 January 2014, has sold 74,504 copies. Volume 5 also reached the 16th place and, as of 21 April 2013, has sold 74,825 copies. Volume 6 reached the 14th place and, as of 22 September 2013, has sold 78,396 copies. Volume 7 reached the 19th place and, as of 19 January 2014, has sold 83,417 copies. Volume 8 reached the 9th place and, as of 25 May 2014, has sold 84,396 copies.

== Film adaptation ==
A live-action adaptation was released on February 25, 2017. It is directed by Taisuke Kawamura and stars Taishi Nakagawa as Kira and Marie Iitoyo as Ninon.

== See also ==
- Kin Kyori Renai, another manga series by the same author
