= Love's Reach =

Japanese manga series by Rin Mikimoto

近キョリ恋愛 (Kin Kyori Renai)
- Manga
- Written by: Rin Mikimoto
- Published by: Kodansha
- English publisher: NA: Kodansha USA (digital)
- Magazine: Bessatsu Friend
- Original run: 2008 – 2011
- Volumes: 10
- Television drama

Kin Kyori Ren'ai ～Season Zero～
- Original network: Nippon Television
- Original run: July 19, 2014 – October 11, 2014
- Episodes: 12
- Live-action film

Close Range Love
- Directed by: Naoto Kumazawa
- Released: October 11, 2014

Love's Reach (近キョリ恋愛, Kin Kyori Ren'ai) is a Japanese comedy romance shōjo manga series written and illustrated by Rin Mikimoto. It was adapted into a Japanese television drama that aired on Nippon Television from July 19 to October 11, 2014 and into a live action film that was released on October 11, 2014, in Japan.

== Characters ==
- Haruka Sakurai (Tomohisa Yamashita)
- Yuni Kururugi (Nana Komatsu)
- Ikuhaba (Nozomu Kotaki)
- Kikuko Nanami (Mizuki Yamamoto)
- Mirei Takizawa (Asami Mizukawa)
- Akachi (Hirofumi Arai)

== Film adaptation ==
A film adaptation was released in 2014. The film has been number one at the Japanese box office for two weeks and has grossed ¥475 million.

== See also ==
- Kyō no Kira-kun, another manga series by the same author
