= Isoroku (film) =

- Theatrical release poster
- Directed by: Izuru Narushima
- Written by: Yasuo Hasegawa; Kenzaburō Iida
- Produced by: Shōhei Kotaki
- Starring: Kōji Yakusho; Hiroshi Abe; Bandō Mitsugorō X
- Music by: Taro Iwashiro
- Production companies: Bandai Visual; Toei Company; Kinoshita Komuten; Watanabe Entertainment; Toei Video; TV Asahi; Hisashi Spirits; SBI Holdings; Broad Media Studio; Asahi Di Kay; Yoshida Masaki Office; Di Complex; Food Discovery; Ennet; Niigata Broadcasting; Niigata Sogo Television; Niigata Television Network 21; Yomiuri Shimbun Holdings; Sanyo Steel Industry; Aoi Corporation; Destiny
- Distributed by: Toei Company
- Release date: 23 December 2011 (Japan)
- Running time: 140 minutes
- Country: Japan
- Language: Japanese
- Box office: $17,041,086

Isoroku (Japanese: 聯合艦隊司令長官 山本五十六 -太平洋戦争70年目の真実-, Hepburn: Rengō Kantai Shirei Chōkan Yamamoto Isoroku: Taiheiyō Sensō Nanajū-nenme no Shinjitsu; lit. "Combined Fleet Commander Isoroku Yamamoto: Truth of the Pacific War 70 Years Ago") is a 2011 Japanese biographical film about Isoroku Yamamoto, the Imperial Japanese Navy's (IJN) Marshal Admiral and the commander-in-chief of the Combined Fleet during World War II. Other English home media titles of the film are The Admiral, and Admiral Yamamoto. English titles not used in home video releases are Yamamoto Isoroku, the Commander-in-Chief of the Combined Fleet and Admiral Isoroku.

== Plot ==
Isoroku Yamamoto is a great naval strategist who climbs up the ranks in the Imperial Japanese Navy. He is against many of the Imperial Japanese Army's decisions, opposing the signing of the Tripartite Pact with Germany and Italy in 1939 and attempts to prevent the impending conflict with the United States amid World War II. Marked for death by radical Japanese nationalists for his outspoken opposition to any attack on the United States, and causing disdain from Japanese war hawks such as newspaper editor Kagekiyo Munakata and military officials. He was educated in the United States, aware of its strengths, and thought a war would be futile. His superiors increasingly pressured him to plan for a full-scale war with the US. Yamamoto was conflicted by his principles and duties. The Japanese military establishment entangles Yamamoto in the war and orders him to prepare the attack on Pearl Harbor. Yamamoto was obligated to carry out the orders as the commander-in-chief of the Japanese Imperial Navy's Combined Fleet. In addition to his direct subordinates feeling increasingly compelled by the ever more desperate war situation to sacrifice themselves in actions, Yamamoto also bonds with a trio of pilots from an A6M Zero aerial battalion prior to the attack on Pearl Harbor; through the attack and then Battle of Midway, the trio dwindled to just a single survivor, who later takes part in the unsuccessful defense against the American ambush of Yamamoto's Mitsubishi G4M during Operation Vengeance. The film ends with Yamamoto's death as his transport is shot down.

== Cast ==
- Kōji Yakusho as Admiral Isoroku Yamamoto
- Hiroshi Tamaki as newspaper reporter Toshikazu Shindo
- Toshirō Yanagiba as Admiral Shigeyoshi Inoue
- Hiroshi Abe as Rear Admiral Tamon Yamaguchi
- Shunji Igarashi as pilot Koichi Makino
- Kenji Kawahara as pilot Keiji Arima
- Masahiro Usui as pilot Takashi Saeki
- Eisaku Yoshida as Yoshitake Miyake
- Takeo Nakahara as Vice Admiral Chūichi Nagumo
- Ikuji Nakamura as Vice Admiral Matome Ugaki
- Bandō Mitsugorō X as Vice Admiral Teikichi Hori
- Mieko Harada as Reiko Yamamoto
- Asaka Seto as Shizu Taniguchi
- Rena Tanaka as Yoshie Kanzaki
- Masatō Ibu as Admiral Osami Nagano
- Akira Emoto as Prime Minister Mitsumasa Yonai
- Kippei Shiina as Captain Kameto Kuroshima
- Nobuko Miyamoto as Kazuko Takahashi
- Teruyuki Kagawa as newspaper editor Kagekiyo Munakata

== Filming ==
The making of the film lasted four years. Koji Yakusho, the lead actor, was reportedly the only actor considered for the role of Yamamoto, and the film would have been canceled if he turned it down. Yakusho was offered the role in the summer of 2009, and accepted the role in the winter of 2010. The production staff declared it intended to present an image of "what a Japanese leader should be".

The film was supervised by renowned historical scholar-writer Kazutoshi Hando. The war movie intended to show the real life of Gensui Yamamoto, Commander-in-Chief of the Combined Fleet. It is a literary work. The award-winning director was Izuru Narushima.

The film was theatrically released in Japan on 308 screens nationwide, the box office revenue reaching ¥150,787,300. The film was viewed by 124,972 people in the first two days of 24 and 25 December 2011. It first appeared in the audience movie ranking (according to the box office news agency), coming in second place.

In September 2012, more than half a year after its release in Japan, the film was specially invited to be screened at the 36th Montreal World Film Festival.

Under the supervision of Hando, he focused on the accuracy of the film's depiction, even including the tableware used aboard ship. Ingenuity has been devised to depict personality and humanity, including scenes in which it is shown that Yamamoto liked water steamed buns (Mizumanju) and the traditional Japanese dessert Shiruko, personal details not dealt with in other works.

At the time of shooting, the Ministry of the Navy's government building (commonly known as red brick building) did not exist, so the main building of the Ministry of Justice, which has a similar appearance, was used for the location.

== Music ==
Theme song "Makoto"
Song- Kei Ogura (Universal Music Group) / Lyrics- Kei Ogura / Composition-Takeo Kato, Masaru Suezaki Exhibition / Arrangement-Takeo Kato
Love theme "For whom the bell rings"
Song- Maki Changu (Vap) / Lyrics / Composition- Maki Changu / Arrangement- Jun Sato

== Reception ==
Rob Schwartz from Metropolis described the film as a "well-paced and well-acted work", which "is not a bad watch for those interested in a Japanese view of the war". Schwartz further noted that unlike the 1968 film of the same name, which "was a piece of propaganda", the 2011 film "doesn’t fall into that trap". Ronnie Scheib from Variety characterised the film as "Izuru Narushima's well-crafted, rather old-fashioned and unquestioning elegy" to Yamamoto, which "succeeds where many biopics fail in fully integrating the private man and the public figure". At the 36th Japan Academy Film Prize, Fumio Hashimoto won an award for Outstanding Achievement in Sound Recording. Kōji Yakusho was nominated for Outstanding Performance by an Actor in a Leading Role.

== Manga ==
The manga version was serialized in "Grand Jump" (Shueisha), which was first published on 16 November 2011, from the first issue to the 17th issue (released on 18 July 2012). Supervision: Kazutoshi Hando, Drawing: Rem Sakakibara.
