= Masachika Ichimura =

Japanese actor (born 1949)

- 市村 正親
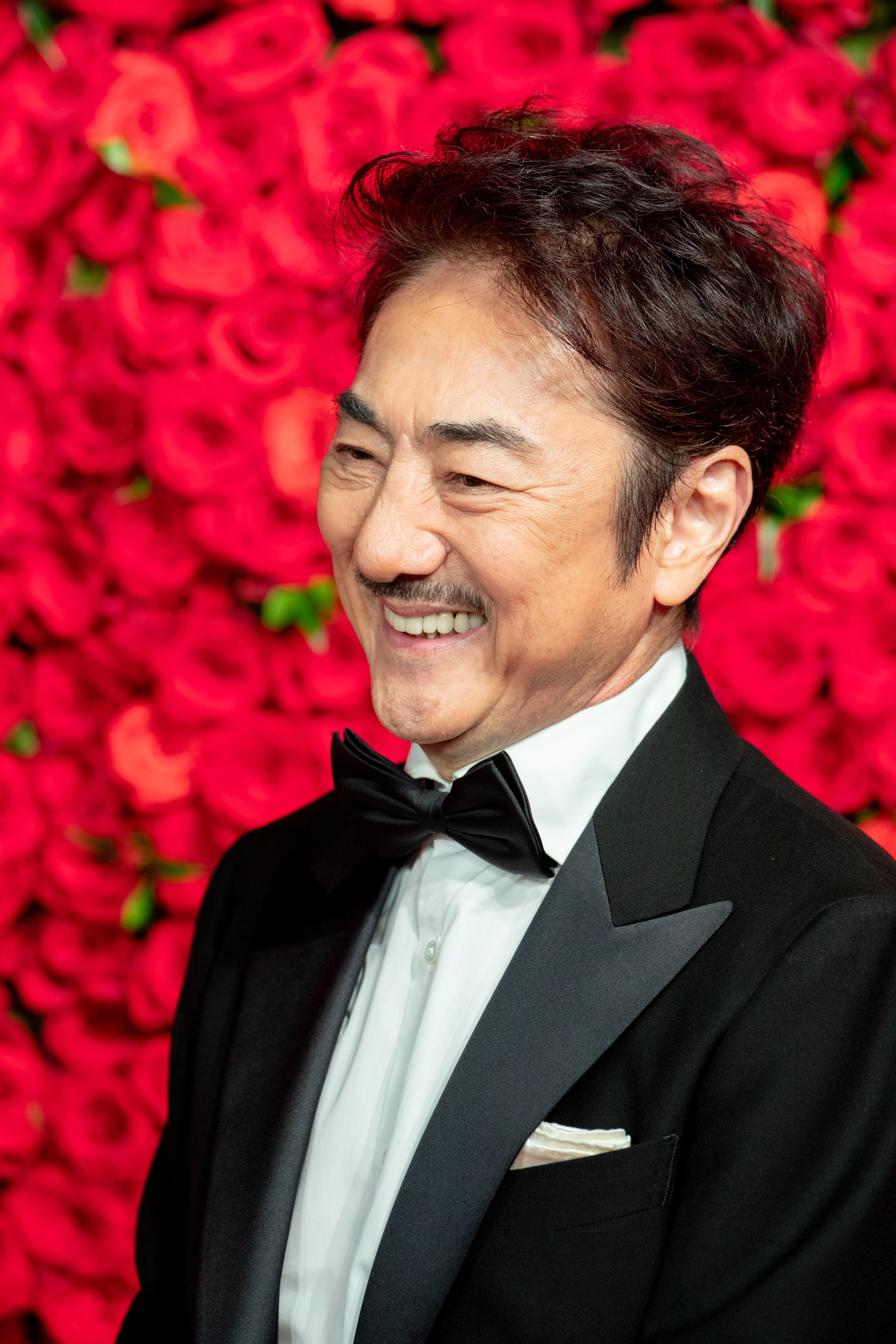
- Masachika Ichimura at the Opening Ceremony of the 2018 Tokyo International Film Festival
- Born: January 28, 1949 (age 77); Kawagoe, Saitama, Japan
- Occupation: Actor
- Years active: 1973–present

Masachika Ichimura (市村 正親, Ichimura Masachika; born January 28, 1949) is a Japanese actor. He was born in Kawagoe, Saitama and studied at the Theater Art College in Tokyo after graduating high school. He has also done voice acting work, with some of his roles being Mewtwo from the Pokémon franchise and Jack Skellington in the Japanese dub of The Nightmare Before Christmas.

== Career ==
In 1973, he made his debut as an actor with Jesus Christ Superstar and, since then, became one of the top actors of Shiki Theatre Company. He appeared in various musical plays, such as West Side Story, Equus, Cats, Evita, and The Phantom of the Opera, and played the role of Shylock in The Merchant of Venice.

In 1990, he left the company and signed up for Horipro. In February 2001, he reprised the role of Mewtwo in Super Smash Bros. Melee. In 2013, he played the role of Tokugawa Ieyasu in Anjin: The Shogun and The English Samurai in London.

In 2014, he cancelled his performance in Miss Saigon because of initial stomach cancer; in November of the same year, he finished treatment and returned to the theatre industry.

As of 2022, Ichimura was the longest running performer to play The Engineer in Miss Saigon, playing the role for 30 years from 1992 until 2022. In 2022, Ichimura also reached over 900 performances playing The Engineer in the Japanese production of Miss Saigon.

== Filmography ==
=== Films ===
- The Hotel Venus (2004) - Venus
- Thirteen Assassins (2010) - Kitō Hanbei
- A Ghost of a Chance (2011) - Tsukutsuku Abe
- The Floating Castle (2012) - Toyotomi Hideyoshi
- For Love's Sake (2012) - Shōgo Saotome
- Thermae Romae (2012) - Hadrian
- Thermae Romae II (2014) - Hadrian
- The Kodai Family (2016) - Shigemasa Kōdai Jr.
- The Stand-In Thief (2017)
- Baragaki: Unbroken Samurai (2021) - Honda Kakuan
- And So the Baton Is Passed (2021)
- Daughter of Lupin the Movie (2021)
- Bushido (2024) - Chōbei
- A Conviction of Marriage (2024) - Kannami
- A Light in the Harbor (2025) - Tomoyuki Tanabe
- New Interpretation of the End of Edo Period (2025) - Jiro Koishikawa, the storyteller

=== Television dramas ===
- Shishi no Jidai (1980) - Okonogi Kyōhei
- Furuhata Ninzaburō (1999) - Nao Kuroikawa
- HR (2002) - Masachika Jin'no
- Mayonaka no Andersen (2002)
- Suna no Utsuwa (2004) - Yuzuru Asō
- Order Made (2004)
- My Boss My Hero (2006) - Kichi Sakaki
- Bambino! (2007) - Tekkan Shishido
- Hatachi no Koibito (2007) - Fūta Suzuki
- Gō (2011) - Akechi Mitsuhide
- Young Black Jack (2011) - Dr. Jotaro Honma
- Beppinsan (2016) - Shigeo Asada
- Ieyasu, Edo wo Tateru (2019) - Tokugawa Ieyasu
- Everyone's Demoted (2019) - Hideki Fujita
- Doctor-X: Surgeon Michiko Daimon (2019) - Nicholas Tange
- Nakamura Nakazo: Shusse no Kizahashi (2021) - Ichikawa Danjūrō IV

=== Musicals ===
- Jesus Christ Superstar - King Herod
- West Side Story - Bernardo
- Equus - Alan
- A Chorus Line - Paul
- Carousel - Jigger Craigin
- She Loves Me - Georg Nowack
- Cats - Rum Tum Tugger
- The Phantom of the Opera - Erik, The Phantom of the Opera
- Tanz der Vampire - Professor Abronsius
- Miss Saigon - The Engineer
- Candide - Dr. Pangloss/the narrator Voltaire
- Two Gentlemen of Verona - Thurio
- Fiddler on the Roof - Tevye
- You're a Good Man, Charlie Brown - Snoopy
- Evita - Che
- Never on Sunday - Ilya
- Kiss of the Spider Woman - Molina
- Cyrano: The Musical - Cyrano de Bergerac
- Scrooge - Scrooge
- Dirty Rotten Scoundrels - Freddy Benson
- Sweeney Todd - Sweeney Todd
- La Cage aux Folles - Albin/Zaza
- Love Never Dies - Erik, the Phantom of the Opera
- Oliver - Fagin
- Mozart! - Leopold

=== Plays ===
- The Merchant of Venice - Shylock
- Anjin: The Shogun and The English Samurai - Tokugawa Ieyasu
- Yukio Ninagawa's Macbeth - Macbeth

=== Theatrical animation ===
- Jack and the Beanstalk (1974) - Jack
- A Journey Through Fairyland (1985) - Michael
- Pokémon: The First Movie (1998) - Mewtwo
- Giovanni's Island (2014) - Tatsuo Senō
- Doraemon: Nobita's Space Heroes (2015) - Ikaros
- Mewtwo Strikes Back: Evolution (2019) - Mewtwo
- Birthday Wonderland (2019) - Hippocrates
- Scarlet (2025) - Amlet

=== Television animation ===
- Pokémon: Mewtwo Returns (2000) - Mewtwo
- Pocket Monsters (2020) - Mewtwo

=== Original video animation (OVA) ===
- Final Fantasy VII: Advent Children (2005) - Red XIII

=== Video games ===
- Super Smash Bros. Melee (2001) - Mewtwo
- Kingdom Hearts (2002) - Jack Skellington
- Kingdom Hearts: Chain of Memories (2004) - Jack Skellington
- Kingdom Hearts II (2005) - Jack Skellington
- Professor Layton and the Miracle Mask (2011) - Bronev Reinel
- One Piece: Unlimited World Red (2013) - Patrick Redfield
- Professor Layton and the Azran Legacy (2013) - Bronev Reinel
- Nioh (2017) - Tokugawa Ieyasu

=== Dubbing ===
- The Nightmare Before Christmas (1993) - Jack Skellington
- Strings (2004) - Kahro
- The Man Who Invented Christmas (2018) - Ebenezer Scrooge
- Minions: The Rise of Gru (2022) - Wild Knuckles
- The Lord of the Rings: The War of the Rohirrim (2024) - Helm Hammerhand

=== Puppetry ===
- Sherlock Holmes (2014) - Jonathan Small

== Honors ==
- Medal with Purple Ribbon (2007)
- Order of the Rising Sun, 4th Class, Gold Rays with Rosette (2019)
