= Hiroshi Abe (actor) =

Japanese model and actor (born 1964)

- 阿部 寛
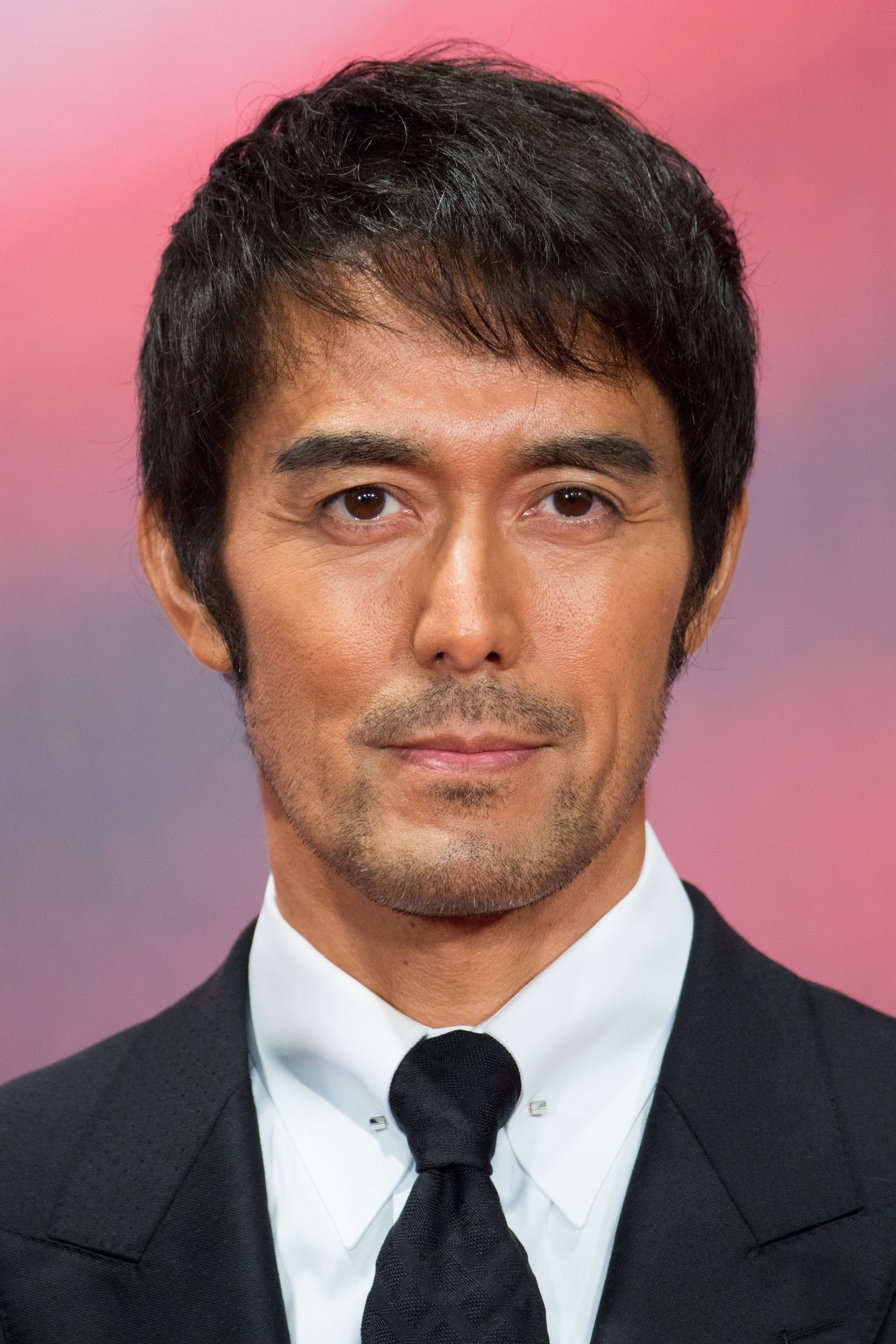
- Abe in 2017
- Born: 22 June 1964 (age 62); Yokohama, Kanagawa, Japan
- Occupations: Actor, model
- Years active: 1983–present
- Height: 189 cm (6 ft 2 1/2 in)
- Children: 2

Hiroshi Abe (阿部 寛, Abe Hiroshi; born June 22, 1964) is a Japanese model and actor. He is known for his roles in TRICK and Godzilla 2000: Millennium.

== Biography ==
=== Modelling period ===
Abe was born on June 22, 1964 in Yokohama as the youngest in a family of three children. He attended Yokohama Mitsuzawa elementary school, then Yokohama City Matsumoto Junior High School, then Kanagawa Prefectural Hakusan High School. After retaking the university entrance examinations, he attended the Department for Electrical Engineering in the Faculty of Science and Technology of Chuo University in Tokyo and graduated with a degree in electrical engineering. In 1985, while in college, he applied to the "Shueisha 3rd Nonno Boyfriend Award" and won the championship because his sister recommended the award. Following that, at university, he was a charismatic model for magazines such as Men's Non-no and Nonno. He later transitioned from modelling into acting.

=== Unfavourable times ===
He made his debut as an actor in the movie Haikara-San: Here Comes Miss Modern (1987) - in which he co-starred with Yoko Minamino, a popular idol of the time whom Abe himself was a fan of, and received an autograph. He also released an album in 1988 as a pop idol. After that year he mainly worked as an actor, but because of his title and appearance as a model he was given only secondary and mundane roles (he said he was "riding with a Ferrari"). Furthermore, there was the problem that it was difficult to take a double shot with a woman because of his height. Gradually, the work in drama decreased, and he suffered from a big feeling of impatience. He was not blessed with work for three years and made a living from pachinko. Around this time he started ancient martial arts which led to later work. Also he invested in an apartment. Due to the decline in real estate values as a result of the bursting of the bubble economy, and the decline in his popularity, he was left with a large debt. He was the target of the variety show What is that person now? which searched for "the celebrity that once dominated the world". According to his book, when he heard that Ken Takakura starred in the NHK drama Chihoru's Elegy in 1992, he wanted to appear even in an unnamed bit part, and he tried to get it even though it was a small part.

=== Turning point ===
In 1993, he starred as a bisexual detective director in Atami Murder Case Monte Carlo Illusion written and directed by Kohei Tsuka. In 1994, he co-starred in Shinoidare (directed by Tatsuoki Hosono) with Koji Yakusho and received the Special Award at the Japanese Professional Movie Awards in combination with film Kyouju Luger P08. Starting with playing the role of the talented Rōjū Matsudaira Norisato in the 1995 NHK Taiga drama Hachidai Shogun Yoshimune, the number of appearances in historical dramas increased over time, especially in the Taiga dramas Genroku Ryoran(1999), Musashi (2003), Yoshitsune (2005), and Tenchijin (2009).

=== Another breakthrough ===
In 2000, he secured a leading role in the drama TRICK, in which he co-starred with Yukie Nakama, he played the role thoroughly and used many photographs of his modelling era as self-deprecation material. In addition, he starred in the movie The Summer of the Ubume which was based on the novel of the same name written by Natsuhiko Kyogoku, and as a result, he help working on postwork of Natsuhiko Kyogoku's book Hyakki Tsurezure Bukuro - Ame which is also inspired by the movie. He wrote his impressions of appearing in this movie.

His performance in the TV drama The Man Who Can't Get Married won the FNS Good Work Grand Prize in 2006.

Popular at the time of the economy bubble, he appeared in the movie Bubble Fiction: Boom or Bust released in 2007.

He took the voicing role of Kenshiro for the animated movie Fist of the North Star: The Legends of the True Savior released on March 11, 2006.

In 2009, Abe won the Best Actor award in the 63rd Mainichi Film Award for his performances in Still Walking and Aoi Tori. Abe also starred in Hideki Takeuchi's Thermae Romae. He then played a supporting role in Hirokazu Kore-eda's I Wish.

== Website ==
Abe's personal website is famous in Japan for its simplicity and retro design, as well as for loading very fast. It is used for benchmarking newly released production such as consoles and hardwares.

== Filmography ==
=== Films ===
- Haikara-San: Here Comes Miss Modern (1987)
- YAWARA! (1989)
- Spirit Warrior (1990)
- Orochi, the Eight-Headed Dragon (1994)
- Moon Over Tao (1997)
- Hissatsu! Shamisenya no Yuji (1999)
- Godzilla 2000: Millennium (1999)
- Tokyo Raiders (2000)
- Crazy Lips (2000)
- Blood Sucking Space (2001)
- Rush! (2001)
- Platonic Sex (2001)
- Trick (2002)
- Hana and Alice (2004)
- Hotel Venus (2004)
- Survive Style 5+ (2004)
- My Lover is a Sniper: The Movie (2004)
- Hasami Otoko (2004)
- Ubume no Natsu (2005)
- Legend of Raoh: Chapter of Fierce Fighting (2006), Kenshiro (voice)
- Trick 2 (2006)
- The Ode to Joy (2006)
- Forbidden Siren (2006)
- Bubble Fiction: Boom or Bust (2007)
- Legend of Yuria (2007), Kenshiro (voice)
- Hero (2007)
- Taitei no Ken (2007)
- Legend of Raoh: Chapter of Fierce Fight (2007), Kenshiro (voice)
- Happy Ever After (2007)
- Team Batista no Eikō (2008)
- Chocolate (2008)
- Legend of Toki (2008), Kenshiro (voice)
- Mōryō no Hako (2008)
- Hidden Fortress: The Last Princess (2008)
- Still Walking (2008)
- The Blue Bird (2008)
- Zero: Legend of Kenshiro (2008), Kenshiro (voice)
- Elevator to the Gallows (2010)
- I Wish (2011)
- A Ghost of a Chance (2011)
- A Yell from Heaven (2011)
- Isoroku (2011), Tamon Yamaguchi
- The Wings of the Kirin (2012), Kyōichirō Kaga
- Thermæ Romæ (2012)
- Crow's Thumb aka Karasu no Oyayubi (2013)
- Before the Vigil (2013)
- Trick The Movie: Last Stage (2014)
- Thermae Romae II (2014)
- Zakurozaka no Adauchi (2014)
- Cape Nostalgia (2014)
- Everest: Kamigami no Itadaki (2016), Jōji Habu
- After the Storm (2016), Ryōta
- A loving husband (2017), Yōhei Miyamoto
- Shippu Rondo (2017), Kazuyuki Kuribayashi
- Umibe No Ria (2017)
- Legend of the Demon Cat (2017), Nakamaro
- Sakura Guardian in the North (2018)
- The Crimes That Bind (2018), Kyōichirō Kaga
- Flea-picking Samurai (2018), Kobayashi Hironoshin
- The Garden of Evening Mists (2019), Nakamura Aritomo
- In the Wake (2021), Seiichirō Tomashino
- Hokusai (2021), Tsutaya Jūzaburō
- Tombi: Father and Son (2022), Yasuo Ichikawa
- Offbeat Cops (2022)
- Showtime 7 (2025)
- Candle Stick (2025), Nohara
- Not Me That Went Viral (2025), Taisuke Yamagata
- Sukiyaki (2026), Nabeyama
- The Potentials (2026), Akira Baba
- Vivant: The Movie (2026), Mamoru Nozaki
- A List for Tomorrow (2027), Taro Egawa
- Hara o Kukutte (2027)

=== TV series ===
- Unmeitōge (1993), Yagyu Jubei
- Glorious Yorujuro (1996–1997), Yorujūrō
- Honeymoon Divorce (1997), Takuya Kitamura
- Yasha (2000), Ken Kurosaki
- Trick (2000–2003), Jirō Ueda
- Hero (2001), Mitsugu Shibayama
- Antique (2001), Chikage Kobayakawa
- Midnight Rain (2002), Shunsuke Izumida
- My Little Chef (2002), Kensaku Tachibana
- The Last Lawyer (2003)
- Rika (2003), Takao Homma
- Musashi (2003), Gion Tōji
- Wedding Planner (2003), Jun Okonogi
- Smile (2003), Reijirō Sakurai
- Fugitive: Runaway (2004), Ryūji Mineshima
- At Home Dad (2004), Kazuyuki Yamamura
- Yoshitsune (2005), Taira no Tomomori
- Dragon Zakura (2005), Kenji Sakuragi
- Kekkon Dekinai Otoko (2006), Shinsuke Kuwano
- Change (2008), Katsutoshi Nirasawa
- Tenchijin (2009), Uesugi Kenshin
- Clouds Over the Hill (2009–2011), Akiyama Yoshifuru
- Shiroi Haru (2009), Haruo Sakura
- Shinzanmono (2010), Kyōichirō Kaga
- Going My Home (2012), Tsuboi Ryota
- Downtown Rocket (2015), Kōhei Tsukuda
- The Sniffer (2016), Hanaoka
- Downtown Rocket Season 2 (2018), Kōhei Tsukuda
- Mada Kekkon Dekinai Otoko (2019), Shinsuke Kuwano
- Dragon Sakura (Dragon Zakura 2) (2021), Kenji Sakuragi
- DCU: Deep Crime Unit (2022), Masayoshi Niina
- Because We Forget Everything (2022), M
- What Will You Do, Ieyasu? (2023), Takeda Shingen
- Vivant (2023–2026) – Mamoru Nozaki
- News Anchor (2025), Soichi Shindo
- Last Samurai Standing (2025), Gentosai Okabe

== Accolades ==
Year	Award	Category	Notable Work	Result	Ref.
1995	Japanese Professional Movie Awards	—N/a	Kyouju Luger P08	Won	
2009	Mainichi Film Awards	Best Actor	Aruitemo Aruitemo & Aoi Tori	Won	
2012	55th Blue Ribbon Awards	Best Actor	Thermæ Romæ, Karasu no oyayubi and The Wings of the Kirin	Won	
2013	36th Japan Academy Film Prize	Best Actor	Thermæ Romæ	Won	
2015	38th Japan Academy Film Prize	Best Actor	Cape Nostalgia	Nominated	
2015	38th Japan Academy Film Prize	Best Supporting Actor	Snow on the Blades	Nominated	
2016	3rd Kyoto International Art and Film Festival	Toshiro Mifune Award	Himself	Won	
2016	9th Tokyo Drama Awards	Best Actor	Downtown Rocket	Won	
2022	45th Japan Academy Film Prize	Best Supporting Actor	In the Wake	Nominated	
2022	21st New York Asian Film Festival	Star Asia Award	Himself	Won	
2022	35th Nikkan Sports Film Awards	Best Actor	Tombi: Father and Son and Offbeat Cops	Won	
2022	47th Hochi Film Awards	Best Actor	Tombi: Father and Son and Offbeat Cops	Nominated	
2023	16th Asian Film Awards	Asian Film Excellence Award	Himself	Won	
