= Curitiba Zero Grau =

2010 film directed by Eloi Pires Ferreira

- Directed by: Eloi Pires Ferreira
- Written by: Altenir Silva
- Starring: Jackson Antunes; Katia Drummond; Rodrigo Ferrarini
- Cinematography: Celso Kava
- Edited by: Fernando Severo
- Release date: 4 October 2010
- Running time: 105 minutes
- Country: Brazil
- Language: Portuguese

Curitiba Zero Grau is a 2010 Brazilian drama film directed by Eloi Pires Ferreira and starring Jackson Antunes.

== Plot ==
In the cold city of Curitiba, four men spend their days in transit: one is a bus driver, the other is a catador (Paper Collector), the third works as an automobile merchant and the last one is a Motorcycle courier. The fate of these anonymous intersects in the heart of the city.

== Cast ==
- Jackson Antunes
- Katia Drummond
- Rodrigo Ferrarini
- Camila Hubner
- Diego Kozievitch
- Enéas Lour
- Stephanie Mattanó
- Olga Nenevê
