= Kazuki Kitamura =

Japanese actor (born 1969)

- 北村 一輝
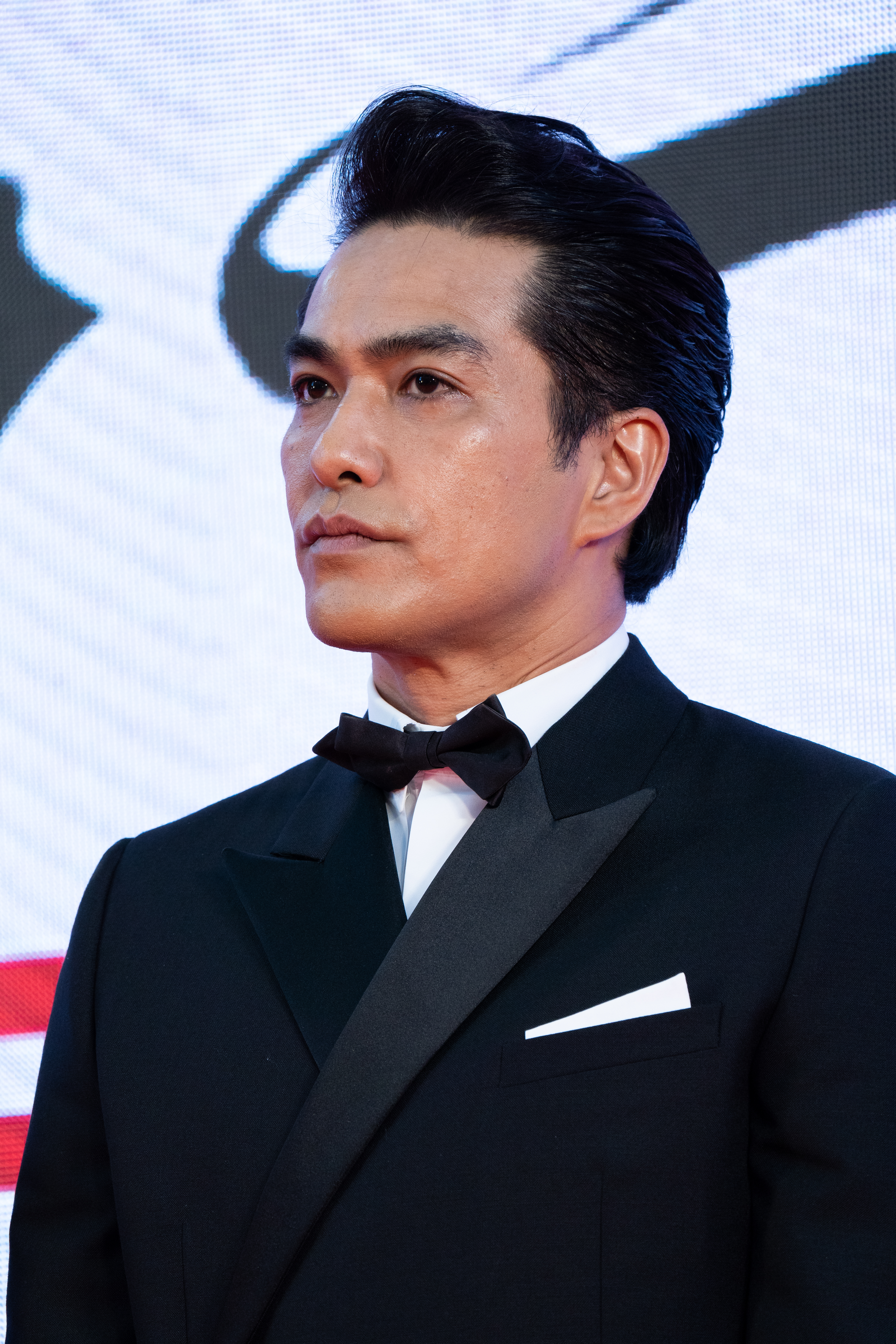
- Kitamura in 2019
- Born: Yasushi Kitamura (北村 康); July 17, 1969 (age 57); Higashisumiyoshi-ku, Osaka, Japan
- Occupation: Actor
- Years active: 1991–present
- Agent: From First Production
- Notable work: Ley Lines; 14-sai no Haha; Yakuza: Like a Dragon; Tenchijin
- Spouses: Unknown (m. 1993; div. 2012); Unknown (m. 2019)
- Children: Shousei Kitamura
- Website: www.from1-pro.jp/KitamuraKazuki/

Kazuki Kitamura (北村 一輝, Kitamura Kazuki; born July 17, 1969) is a Japanese film and television actor who won the award for best supporting actor at the 21st Yokohama Film Festival for Minazuki, Kyohansha and Kanzen-naru shiiku as well as the Cut Above Award for Excellence in Film at Japan Cuts: Festival of New Japanese Film in New York in 2014.

== Personal life ==
In 1993, Kitamura married a non-celebrity woman. In 1994, their only child, actor Shousei Kitamura, was born. In 2012, Kitamura confirmed through his agency that he had divorced his wife of nineteen years.

On December 27, 2019, he announced his second marriage, again to a non-celebrity woman.

== Selected filmography ==
=== Film ===
- Yuki no Concerto (1991)
- The Way to Fight (1996), Kubo
- Tenzen Shoujo Man (天然少女 萬) (1996)
- Young Thugs: Innocent Blood (岸和田少年愚連隊 血煙り純情篇) (1997), Sada
- Onibi (鬼火) (1997), Hideyuki Sakata
- Mukokuseki no otoko: Chi no shûkaku (1997)
- Romantikku mania (1997), Ujiie
- The Eel (1997)
- Joker (1998), Hisao
- Andromedia (アンドロメディア) (1998), Sada
- Kanzen-naru shiiku (1999), Tsuda
- Kyohansha (1999), Yasuharu Nishikawa
- Kaizokuban Bootleg Film (海賊版) (1999), Yoji
- Ley Lines (日本黒社会 LEY LINES) (1999), Ryuichi
- Minazuki (1999), Akira
- Dead or Alive (DEAD OR ALIVE 犯罪者) (1999)
- Freeze Me (フリーズ・ミー) (2000), Noboru Hirokawa
- Himawari (2000), Shinji Sasahara
- Swing Man (2000), Kazuki Kitaoka
- Kishiwada Shōnen Gurentai: Yakyudan (2000)
- Rendan (2001), Ohsawa
- Man-hole (2001), Shin'ichi Yoshioka
- Turn (2001), Kakizaki Kiyotaka
- Chinpira (2001)
- Bastoni: The Stick Handlers (2002)
- Onna kunishuu ikki (2002)
- Jam Films (2002) (segment "The Messenger - Requiem for the Dead")
- Yurusarezaru mono (2003)
- Azumi (2003), Kanbê Inoue
- 9 Souls (2003), Tamori
- Kanzen-naru shiiku: Onna rihatsushi no koi (2003), Kenji
- Kill Bill: Volume 1 (2003), Boss Koji / Crazy 88
- Sky High (スカイハイ劇場版) (2003)
- The Man In White (許されざる者) (2003)
- Kyô no dekigoto (2003), Surfer
- Kill Bill: Volume 2 (2004), Boss Koji / Crazy 88
- Kill Bill: The Whole Bloody Affair (2004), Boss Koji / Crazy 88
- Kaidan Shin Mimibukuro: Gekijōban (2004) (segment "Omoi!")
- Blood and Bones (血と骨) (2004), Yoshio Motoyama
- Godzilla: Final Wars (ゴジラ FINAL WARS) (2004), The Controller of Planet X
- Atarashii kaze - Wakaki hi no Yoda Benzo (2004), Benzo Yoda
- Azumi 2: Death or Love (あずみ2 Death or Love) (2005), Kanbê Inoue
- Sengoku Jieitai 1549 (戦国自衛隊1549) (2005), Shichibe Iinuma
- Nureta akai ito (2005), Shigeru
- Maze (2006)
- So-Run Movie (2006)
- Tokyo Friends: The Movie (東京フレンズ The Movie) (2006)
- Hanada Shōnen-shi (花田少年史 幽霊と秘密のトンネル) (2006), Masahiko Sawai
- Oh! Oku (大奥) (2006), Chojuro Kaneko
- Yakuza: Like a Dragon (2007), Kazuma Kiryu
- Maiko Haaaan!!! (2007), Doctor
- Kaze no sotogawa (2007)
- Dôsôkai (2008)
- Jirochô sangokushi (2008)
- Suspect X (2008), Shunpei Kusanagi
- Donjū (2009), Chi Edajima
- Eo-ddeon bang-moon (2009)
- Killer VirginRoad (2009), Michio Keizan
- Acacia (2009)
- Space Battleship Yamato (2010)
- Kaibutsu-kun (2011), Sunil
- Speed Angels (2011), Asano / Onidaka
- Thermae Romae (2012), Ceionius
- Bakugyaku Familia (2012), Yuji natsume
- Nihon no higeki (2012)
- Yokai Ningen Bem (2012), Akinori Natsume
- Night People (2013), Shinji
- Jongeun Chingoodeul (2013), Tatsuya
- Midsummer's Equation (2013), Shunpei Kusanagi
- Ataru The First Love & The Last Kill (劇場版 Ataru The First Love & The Last Kill) (2013), Shunichi Sawa
- SPEC: Close (2013, part 1, 2)
- The Trick Movie: The Last Stage (2014)
- Killers (2014), Nomura
- The Raid 2 (2014), Ryuichi
- Samurai Cat (2014), Madarame Kyutaro
- Thermae Romae II (2014), Ceionius
- Man From Reno (2014), Akira
- Parasyte: Part 1 (2014), Takeshi Hirokawa
- Parasyte: Part 2 (2015), Takeshi Hirokawa
- Neko zamurai: Minami no shima e iku (2015), Kyutaro Madarame
- AIBOU: The Movie IV (2017)
- Blade of the Immortal (2017), Sabato Kuroi
- The 8-Year Engagement (2017), Shibata
- The Scythian Lamb (2018), Katsushi sugiyama
- Color Me True (2018), Ryunosuke Shundo
- Last Winter, We Parted (2018), Yoshiki Kobayashi
- Pretty Cure Super Stars! (2018), Usobakka (voice)
- Million Dollar Man (2018), Momose
- The Battle: Roar to Victory (2019), Yasukawa Jiro
- Rurouni Kenshin: The Final (2021), Tatsumi
- Rurouni Kenshin: The Beginning (2021), Tatsumi
- Signal the Movie (2021), Takeshi Ōyama
- The Supporting Actors: The Movie (2021), himself
- The Great Yokai War: Guardians (2021), Watanabe no Tsuna
- Silent Parade (2022), Shunpei Kusanagi
- Hell Dogs (2022), Tsutomu Toki
- Zom 100: Bucket List of the Dead (2023), Gonzo Kosugi
- From the End of the World (2023)
- Fly Me to the Saitama: From Biwa Lake with Love (2023)
- Don't Lose Your Head! (2024), Tokugawa Tsunayoshi
- Let's Go Karaoke! (2024), yakuza boss
- Gold Boy (2024)
- The Yin Yang Master Zero (2024), Koremune no Korekuni
- Muromachi Outsiders (2025), Nawa
- Sham (2025), lawyer Norio Yamato
- They Call Him OG (2025), Yakuza leader Kazao
- Golden Kamuy: The Abashiri Prison Raid (2026), Shirosuke Inudō
- Yakushima's Illusion (2026), Ryoji
- Samurai Vengeance (2026), Sakube
- Never Guilty (2026), Daisaku Kimizuka
- Okinawa Confidential (2027), Shoji Gushiken

=== Television ===
- Kiseki no Hito (奇跡の人) (1998)
- Border (1999)
- Cinderella wa Nemuranai (2000)
- Limit: Moshimo Wagako Ga (リミットもしも,わが子が...) (2000), Grey Won
- Kamisama no Itazura (神様のいたずら) (2000), Shōta Honma
- Hojo Tokimune (北条時宗) (2001, Taira no Yoritsuna)
- Suiyoubi no Jouji (水曜日の情事) (TV Movie), Shōgo Okino
- Kaidan Hyaku Monogatari (怪談百物語) Episode 11 (2002), Shinzaburō
- Haru Ranman (春ランマン) (2003), Joji Manabe
- Tantei Kazoku (探偵家族) (2003), Kōsuke Kanda
- Ōoku (大奥) (2003), Tokugawa Iesada
- Team Medical Dragon (医龍-Team Medical Dragon-) (Fuji TV, 2006), Gunji Kirishima
- Night King (夜王～YAOH～) (TBS, 2006), Seiya
- Densha Otoko Deluxe (2006), Maesono
- Akihabara@DEEP (アキハバラ@DEEP) (2006), Takeshi Nakagomi
- Mother at Fourteen (2006), Hatano
- Bambino! (2007), Reiji Yona
- Galileo (2007), Shunpei Kusanagi
- Team Medical Dragon 2 (2007), Gunji Kirishima
- Tenchijin (2009), Kagekatsu Uesugi
- Yokai Ningen Bem (2011), Akinori Natsume
- Galileo 2 (2013), Shunpei Kusanagi
- Hirugao (2014), Osamu Katō
- Kindaichi Case Files SP 2 - Gate of Jail Private School Murder Case (2014), Takayuki Ujie
- Hamon (2015), Yasuhiko Kuwahara
- Yamegoku: Yakuza Yamete Itadakimasu (2015), Kakeru Mikajima
- Ishitsubute (2017)
- Signal (2018)
- Folklore "Tatami" (2018)
- Ōoku the Final (2019), Tokugawa Muneharu
- Scarlet (2019–20)
- The Return (2020), Jōji Kawahara
- North Light (2020)
- Heaven and Hell: Soul Exchange (2021), Mitsuo Kawahara
- Okehazama (2021), Oda Nobuhide
- The Forbidden Magic (2022), Shunpei Kusanagi
- Born to Be On Air! (2023), Kanetsugu Matō
- Tokyo Swindlers (2024)
- Golden Kamuy: The Hunt of Prisoners in Hokkaido (2024), Shirosuke Inudō
- La Grande Maison Tokyo Special (2024), Sosuke Akashi
- Unbound (2025), Motoori Norinaga
- The Scent of the Wind (2026), Shin'emon Ichinose
- The Shogunate Rebel (2027), Torii Yōzō

=== Dubbing ===
- Aladdin (2019), Jafar (Marwan Kenzari)
