= Close Range Love (film) =

- Film poster
- 近キョリ恋愛 (Kinkyori Renai)
- Directed by: Naoto Kumazawa
- Written by: Yukiko Manabe
- Based on: Kin Kyori Renai by Rin Mikimoto
- Starring: Tomohisa Yamashita; Nana Komatsu; Asami Mizukawa; Hirofumi Arai
- Cinematography: Hiroo Yanagida
- Music by: Gorou Yasukawa
- Distributed by: Toho
- Release date: October 11, 2014
- Running time: 118 minutes
- Country: Japan
- Language: Japanese
- Box office: US$9.8 million (Japan)

Close Range Love (近キョリ恋愛, Kin Kyori Ren'ai) is a 2014 Japanese romance film directed by Naoto Kumazawa and an adaptation of the manga series of the same name.

== Plot ==
Kururugi Yuni is a high school prodigy who has a difficult time expressing herself. And whilst having top grades in all her subjects, she isn't doing so well in English and so her English class teacher, Haruka Sakurai gives her temporary private one on one English lessons.

But when the guardian of Yuni who is also the schools maths teacher, Kazuma Akechi, notices the differences in Yuni's behaviour, he decideds to put a stop to the tutoring.

With the encouragement of her only friend, Nanami Kikuko, Yuni realises that she has fallen in love with her teacher, Sakurai who also happens to be admired by every girl in school. Every time Yuni has the chance to express the way she feels to Sakurai, she isn't able to do so.

But finally, Yuni musters up the courage to confess to her teacher and tries to do so by using a notebook that reads "I hate you teacher but I also like you. What should I do?" while hiding under his desk in class. Sakurai sees her and purposely drops a pen. While bending down to pick the pen, he leans towards her before kissing her.

Trying to keep it a secret, Sakurai doesn't know that the new homeroom teacher of Yuni's class, Mirei Takizawa, who is being shown around, coincidentally sees the incident between them.

When a co-teacher introduces Mirei to Sakurai, Sakurai is surprised to see his childhood friend again. Mirei tells Sakurai what she saw and that she still has feelings for him. But things develop further between Yuni and Sakurai when Mirei tries to stop their relationship by taking a photo of Sakurai and Yuni hugging each other as she passes them. Mirei shows the photo to Akechi when he asks for Mirei's help to keep an eye on her as he is concerned about her strange behavior which leads to Akechi confronting Sakurai and asking him to leave Yuni as she has given up her dreams of going to her dream college for Sakurai. Akechi asks Sakurai to encourage her to study abroad which he is reluctant to do but does out of care for Yuni.

Heartbroken when Sakurai cuts ties between the two of them, Yuni decides to follow her dreams. However she is unable to forget him after leaving to study at the University of California and she soon returns to Japan to confront him again. The two of them finally reconcile at the beach where they had their first date.

== Cast ==
- Tomohisa Yamashita as Haruka Sakurai
- Nana Komatsu as Yuni Kururugi
- Asami Mizukawa as Mirei Takizawa
- Nozomu Kotaki as Ryu Matoba
- Mizuki Yamamoto as Kikuko Nanami
- Hirofumi Arai as Kazuma Akechi
- Kazuma Sano as Saki Sato
- Seika Furuhata as Mei Yoshida

== Development ==
The trailer and poster for the film were released on October 6, 2014. Japanese band Sakanaction performed the film's theme song, "Hasu no Hana".

== Reception ==
Close Range Love grossed US$9,812,922 at the Japanese box office. It also held the number one spot in the Japanese box office for three weeks.
