= List of 2014 box office number-one films in Japan =

This is a list of films which placed number one at the weekend box office in Japan for the year 2014.

== Number-one films ==
†	This implies the highest-grossing movie of the year.

#	Date	Film	Gross	Notes
1	January 5, 2014	The Eternal Zero	$5,070,839	
2	January 12, 2014	The Eternal Zero	$4,487,809	
3	January 19, 2014	The Eternal Zero	$3,839,599	
4	January 26, 2014	The Eternal Zero	$3,664,012	
5	February 2, 2014	The Eternal Zero	$3,270,906	
6	February 9, 2014	The Eternal Zero	$1,675,375	
7	February 16, 2014	The Mole Song: Undercover Agent Reiji	$2,772,177	
8	February 23, 2014	The Mole Song: Undercover Agent Reiji	$2,305,155	
9	March 2, 2014	The Hobbit: The Desolation of Smaug	$3,077,274	
10	March 9, 2014	The Hobbit: The Desolation of Smaug	$1,595,766	
11	March 16, 2014	Frozen †	$7,531,463	
12	March 23, 2014	Frozen †	$8,530,751	
13	March 30, 2014	Frozen †	$8,569,604	
14	April 6, 2014	Frozen †	$8,238,087	
15	April 13, 2014	Frozen †	$8,286,116	
16	April 20, 2014	Frozen †	$8,046,563	
17	April 27, 2014	Frozen †	$7,558,540	
18	May 4, 2014	Frozen †	$11,037,689	
19	May 11, 2014	Frozen †	$7,259,605	
20	May 18, 2014	Frozen †	$7,951,805	
21	May 25, 2014	Frozen †	$6,868,097	
22	June 1, 2014	Frozen †	$7,462,133	
23	June 8, 2014	Frozen †	$5,781,224	
24	June 15, 2014	Frozen †	$3,847,904	
25	June 22, 2014	Frozen †	$3,567,345	
26	June 29, 2014	Frozen †	$2,705,427	
27	July 6, 2014	Maleficent	$6,777,176	
28	July 13, 2014	Maleficent	$5,967,979	
29	July 20, 2014	Maleficent	$4,735,780	
30	July 27, 2014	Godzilla	$4,992,630	
31	August 3, 2014	Rurouni Kenshin: Kyoto Inferno	$5,771,723	
32	August 10, 2014	Stand by Me Doraemon	$7,519,092	
33	August 17, 2014	Stand by Me Doraemon	$6,854,429	
34	August 24, 2014	Stand by Me Doraemon	$4,681,835	
35	August 31, 2014	Stand by Me Doraemon	$4,995,636	
36	September 7, 2014	Stand by Me Doraemon	$3,556,721	
37	September 14, 2014	Rurouni Kenshin: The Legend Ends	$8,566,043	
38	September 21, 2014	Rurouni Kenshin: The Legend Ends	$3,841,218	
39	September 28, 2014	Rurouni Kenshin: The Legend Ends	$2,538,814	
40	October 5, 2014	Rurouni Kenshin: The Legend Ends	$1,616,576	
41	October 12, 2014	Close Range Love	$1,657,742	
42	October 19, 2014	Close Range Love	$1,157,339	
43	October 26, 2014	Close Range Love	$1,031,273	
44	November 2, 2014	The Expendables 3	$1,608,196	
45	November 9, 2014	Beauty and the Beast	$997,140	
46	November 16, 2014	As the Gods Will	$1,550,277	
51	December 21, 2014	Yo-Kai Watch: Tanjō no Himitsu da Nyan!	$13.6 million	

== Highest-grossing films ==
International film Japanese film

Highest-grossing films of 2014
Rank	Title	Gross
1	Frozen	¥25.48 billion ($240.5 million)
2	The Eternal Zero	¥8.76 billion ($82.68 million)
3	Stand by Me Doraemon	¥8.38 billion ($79.1 million)
4	Maleficent	¥6.54 billion ($61.73 million)
5	Rurouni Kenshin: Kyoto Inferno	¥5.22 billion ($49.27 million)
6	Thermae Romae II	¥4.42 billion ($41.72 million)
7	Rurouni Kenshin: The Legend Ends	¥4.35 billion ($41.06 million)
8	Lupin the 3rd vs. Detective Conan: The Movie	¥4.26 billion ($40.21 million)
9	Detective Conan: Dimensional Sniper	¥4.11 billion ($38.79 million)
10	Doraemon: New Nobita's Great Demon—Peko and the Exploration Party of Five	¥3.58 billion ($33.79 million)

== See also ==
- List of Japanese films of 2014
