= El hijo de Hernández =

- Directed by: Lorenzo M. Ponce de León
- Written by: Frédéric Conrod
- Produced by: Frédéric Conrod
- Starring: Juan Penalva; Antonio Sarrió; Roxanne Rodríguez; Guglia Rivera; Kathleen Zamon
- Cinematography: Lorenzo M. Ponce de León and Lamise Mansur
- Edited by: Lorenzo M. Ponce de León and Catalina Pire Schmidt
- Music by: Sergio Canteros
- Release date: 12 April 2013
- Running time: 77 minutes
- Countries: Spain; United States
- Language: Spanish

El hijo de Hernández is an American-made 2013 Spanish feature-length drama film directed by Lorenzo M. Ponce de León and is based on the novel El hijo de Hernández by Frédéric Conrod, and starring Juan Penalva, Antonio Sarrió, Roxanne Rodríguez, Guglia Rivera, and Kathleen Zamon. It was created alongside the author of the book and shot in Madrid and Castilla-La Mancha, Spain, when the actual setting of the book and film is undisclosed. The narrative is set almost entirely in the desert. Ponce de León describes the film as "The precise balance between theatre and cinema giving viewers both a cinematic experience and the sensations of sitting in a theatre watching actors on a stage."

== Cast ==
- Juan Penalva as Miguel
- Antonio Sarrió as Don Álvaro
- Roxanne Rodríguez as Marcela / Polica del Desierto
- Guglia Rivera as Linda
- Kathleen Zamon as Mujer Alemana / Difunta Correa

== Production ==
Produced through MADRID_CREAcción y Teatro Lírico de Las Muñecas in Madrid, El hijo de Hernández was financed through a scholarship awarded by Florida Atlantic University. Filming started on 14 June 2012 in Madrid. The film's entire shooting lasted approximately three weeks and included shooting a music video based on the song El hijo de Hernández by El Cuarteto de Nos.

== Release ==
The film was released to a private audience on 12 April 2013 in Living Room Theaters in Boca Raton, Florida.
