= Izuru Narushima =

Japanese scriptwriter and film director (1961–2026)

Izuru Narushima (成島 出, Narushima Izuru; 1961 – 24 August 2026) was a Japanese scriptwriter and film director from Yamanashi Prefecture. In 2011, his film Rebirth was awarded the Japanese Academy Prize for best picture. Born in 1961, Narushima died from lung cancer on 24 August 2026, at the age of 65.

== Filmography ==
=== As director ===
- The Hunter and the Hunted (2004)
- Fly, Daddy, Fly (2005)
- Midnight Eagle (2007)
- Love Fight (2008)
- The Lone Scalpel (2010)
- Isoroku (2011)
- Rebirth (2011)
- A Chair on the Plains (2013)
- Cape Nostalgia (2014)
- Solomon's Perjury 1: Suspicion (2015)
- Solomon's Perjury 2: Judgment (2015)
- To Each His Own (2017)
- Good-Bye (2020)
- A Morning of Farewell (2021)
- Familia (2023)
- Father of the Galactic Railroad (2023)
- 52-Hertz Whales (2024)
