= The Little House (2014 film) =

- Original Japanese Poster.
- Directed by: Yoji Yamada
- Screenplay by: Yoji Yamada; Emiko Hiramatsu
- Based on: Chiisai Ouchi by Kyoko Nakajima
- Produced by: Hiroyuki Saitō; Hiroshi Fukazawa; Tadashi Ohsumi
- Starring: Takako Matsu; Haru Kuroki; Hidetaka Yoshioka; Satoshi Tsumabuki; Chieko Baisho; Takataro Kataoka
- Cinematography: Masashi Chikamori
- Edited by: Iwao Ishii
- Music by: Joe Hisaishi
- Distributed by: Shochiku
- Release date: January 25, 2014 (Japan)
- Running time: 136 minutes
- Country: Japan
- Language: Japanese
- Box office: ¥123 million (US$1.19 million)

The Little House (Japanese: 小さいおうち, Hepburn: Chiisai Ouchi) is a 2014 Japanese drama film directed by Yoji Yamada and based on a novel by Kyoko Nakajima. It was released in Japan on 25 January 2014.

== Plot ==
The film is set in the 1930s and 1940s in Japan. It is narrated from the memoirs of Taki Nunomiya as an old woman. In 1930, she left Yamagata for Tokyo as an indentured servant to work as a housemaid.

== Cast ==
- Takako Matsu
- Haru Kuroki
- Hidetaka Yoshioka
- Satoshi Tsumabuki
- Chieko Baisho
- Takataro Kataoka
- Kazuko Yoshiyuki
- Yui Natsukawa
- Nenji Kobayashi
- Fumino Kimura
- Yukijirō Hotaru
- Takashi Sasano
- Hidetaka Yoshioka - Itakura
- Shigeru Muroi
- Tomoko Nakajima
- Isao Hashizume

== Reception ==
The film was in competition for the Golden Bear at the 64th Berlin International Film Festival, where Haru Kuroki won the Silver Bear for Best Actress.

Two days after being released it had grossed ¥123 million (US$1.19 million) at the Japanese box office.
