= Snow on the Blades =

- Poster
- 柘榴坂の仇討
- Directed by: Setsurō Wakamatsu
- Screenplay by: Hironobu Takamatsu; Yasuo Hasegawa; Kenzaburō Iida
- Story by: Jirō Asada
- Produced by: Shohei Kotaki; Yoshihiro Kato; Masamitsu Haga; Manabu Inoue; Yumiko Takebe; Hikaru Tani; Kanjiro Sakura
- Starring: Kiichi Nakai; Hiroshi Abe; Ryōko Hirosue; Nakamura Kichiemon II
- Cinematography: Tokushō Kikumura
- Edited by: Hirohide Abe
- Music by: Joe Hisaishi
- Distributed by: Shochiku
- Release date: September 20, 2014 (Japan)
- Running time: 119 minutes
- Country: Japan
- Language: Japanese

Snow on the Blades (Japanese: 柘榴坂の仇討, Hepburn: Zakurozaka no Adauchi) is a 2014 Japanese jidaigeki film directed by Setsurō Wakamatsu. It is based on a short story by Jirō Asada. It was released on September 20, 2014.

== Cast ==
- Kiichi Nakai as Kingo Shimura
- Hiroshi Abe as Jūbei Sahashi
- Ryōko Hirosue as Setsu Shimura
- Masahiro Takashima as Shinnosuke Naitō
- Sei Matobu
- Eisaku Yoshida
- Yuria Kizaki
- Masane Tsukayama
- Tatsuya Fuji
- Nakamura Kichiemon II as Naosuke Ii

== Reception ==
The film received four nominations at the 38th Japan Academy Prize: Outstanding Performance by an Actor in a Leading Role (Kiichi Nakai), Outstanding Performance by an Actor in a Supporting Role (Hiroshi Abe), Outstanding Achievement in Art Direction (Fumio Ogawa) and Outstanding Achievement in Sound Recording (Osamu Onodera).
