= Giovanni's Island =

2014 Japanese animated film

- Theatrical release poster
- Directed by: Mizuho Nishikubo
- Screenplay by: Shigemichi Sugita; Yoshiki Sakurai
- Story by: Shigemichi Sugita
- Produced by: Yoshiki Sakurai; Tomoyuki Miyagawa
- Starring: Masachika Ichimura; Yukie Nakama
- Cinematography: Yumiko Nakata
- Edited by: Junichi Uematsu
- Music by: Masashi Sada
- Production company: Production I.G
- Distributed by: Warner Bros. Pictures
- Release date: February 22, 2014 (Japan)
- Running time: 102 minutes
- Country: Japan
- Language: Japanese
- Box office: $342,838

Giovanni's Island (Japanese: ジョバンニの島, Hepburn: Jobanni no Shima) is a 2014 Japanese animated historical drama film directed by Mizuho Nishikubo and produced by Production I.G and co-produced and presented by the Japan Association of Music Enterprises. The film was released on February 22, 2014, in Japan and North America on March 22, 2014, in New York International Children's Film Festival. GKIDS licensed the film for release in North America and released it on Blu-ray and Digital on February 21, 2023.

The film makes frequent allusions to Kenji Miyazawa's Night on the Galactic Railroad, and borrows the name in its title from that of the book's protagonist.

== Plot ==
The story follows two brothers, Junpei and Kanta, who live on the island of Shikotan with their grandfather, a fisherman, and their father, the head of the firefighting force of the village. Following Japan's defeat in World War II and the invasion of the islands by the Soviet Red Army, the family is forced to move to the stables while the Russian commander's family, among them the commander's daughter Tanya, move into the main house. At school, Russian children occupy half the building, and Tanya and the other Russian kids begin to mingle with the Japanese children at recess. After a playground jostle makes Junpei bump into Tanya, they become friends and the two brothers are subsequently invited to Tanya's house for dinner. The brothers' uncle, Hideo, asks Junpei to light signal fires at night so that he can make trips to the main island for rations as they are running low on rice. Meanwhile, their father, Tatsuo, with the help of their school teacher, Sawako, secretly supplies the rest of the village with foodstuff from the Dawn Corps' emergency stores. When Hideo finds out about this, he tries to smuggle the food to sell outside the island, but gets caught instead. Tatsuo rushes to the cave where the Dawn Corps' supplies are kept and gets arrested.

On September 25, 1947, the Japanese on the island are made to assemble at the harbor, to be sent to the Japanese mainland. Junpei and Kanta set out with Sawako, while their grandfather chooses to stay behind, determined to spend his last moments on the sea. The three are reunited with Hideo while boarding the ship, and arrive a few days later at an internment camp in Maoka, in western Karafuto (Sakhalin), where they wait for the ship that will take them to the mainland. Hideo finds out that Tatsuo is alive and at another internment camp on the other side of the mountains "just a stone's throw away". Kanta, taking his words literally, sets out to meet his father, aided by Junpei. Sawako and Hideo track the two down the next day, and to Hideo's surprise, Sawako decides to visit Tatsuo's camp as well. The four of them drive to a pillbox where they spend the night, but in the morning they spot Soviet soldiers who've managed to track them down, and Hideo runs ahead as a decoy while Sawako and the children make their escape.

The trio are able to make their way to the internment camp holding Tatsuo, where they have a tearful farewell, with Tatsuo promising he'll find a way to reunite with them no matter what. However, as they try to return, Kanta suddenly falls extremely ill and they are caught by the camp guards. The warden arranges for the trio to be sent back to the harbor by truck, but Kanta succumbs to his illness en route. Junpei and Sawako reunite with Hideo at the harbor where they line up to board the ship back to Japan. Junpei keeps talking to Kanta about the story of the "Night on the Galactic Railroad" to fool the guards into thinking Kanta is still alive so they won't dispose of his body. As he talks, Junpei has a vision of Kanta's spirit riding a ghostly train up into the stars.

56 years later, Sawako and Junpei return to Shikotan and pay their respects at Tatsuo and Kanta's graves. Junpei's school holds a graduation ceremony for those who never managed to have it, and a blonde girl, Tanya's granddaughter, approaches Junpei at dinner. She hands him a notebook, containing one of Junpei's sketches of Tanya, and Junpei gives her his old copy of "Night on the Galactic Railroad" in return. Junpei is saddened to learn that Tanya had died a year earlier. The Russian hosts then begin to play music and the partygoers, both Russian and Japanese, begin to dance. Tanya's granddaughter invites Junpei to dance with her, and the scene morphs to the spirits of Shikotan's original residents dancing with each other among the stars.

== Cast ==
- Masachika Ichimura as Tatsuo Senō (瀬能 辰夫, Senō Tatsuo)
- Yukie Nakama as Sawako (佐和子)
- Kanako Yanagihara as Micchan (みっちゃん, Mitchan)
- Yūsuke Santamaria as Hideo (英夫)
- Kōta Yokoyama as Junpei Senō (瀬能 純平, Senō Junpei)
- Junya Taniai as Kanta Senō (瀬能 寛太, Senō Kanta)
- Polina Ilyushenko as Tanya (ターニャ, Tānya)
- Saburo Kitajima as Genzō Senō (瀬能 源三, Senō Genzō)
- Hiroshi Inuzuka as Chief
- Kaoru Yachigusa as Sawako (Present)
- Tatsuya Nakadai as Junpei Senō (Present)

== Festival history ==
- 17th New York International Children's Film Festival (2014) / Official Competition
- 21st Stuttgart Festival of Animated Film (2014) / AniMovie Competition
- 54th Zlin International Film Festival for Children and Youth (2014) / Official Selection
- 38th Annecy International Animated Film Festival (2014) / Official Competition
- 36th Moscow International Film Festival (2014) / Official Selection
- 18th Fantasia International Film Festival (2014) / Official Selection
- 18th Puchon International Fantastic Film Festival (2014) / Official Selection
- 62nd Melbourne International Film Festival (2014) / Official Selection
- 22nd Tokyo Kinder Film Festival (2014) / Official Competition
- 4th Sakhalin International Film Festival (2014) / Closing Film
- 13th Nueva Mirada Film Festival (2014) / Official Competition
- 46th Sitges Film Festival (2014) / Official Competition
- 38th Portland International Film Festival (2015) / Official Selection
- 13th Imaginaria Film Festival (2015) / Official Selection

== Reception ==
The review aggregator Rotten Tomatoes reported an approval rating of 75%, based on 8 reviews.

== Awards ==
- Jury Distinction, 38th Annecy Animation Film Festival (2014)
- Satoshi Kon Award, 18th Fantasia Film Festival (2014)
- Audience Award, 18th Fantasia Film Festival (2014)
- Jury Special Mention, 13th Nueva Mirada (2014)
- Jury Award, 5th Scotland Loves Animation (2014)
- Children's Jury Prize, 31st Chicago Int'l Children's Film Festival (2014)
- Adult Jury Prize, 31st Chicago Int'l Children's Film Festival (2014)
- Excellence Award, 18th Japan Media Arts Festival (2014)
- Best Animation Film, 69th Mainichi Film Awards (2014)
- Jury Award, 13th Imaginaria Film Festival (2015)

== See also ==
- Kuril Islands dispute
- Repatriation of Japanese from South Sakhalin and the Kuril Islands
