= Pale Moon (film) =

2014 film

- Poster
- Directed by: Daihachi Yoshida
- Based on: Kami no Tsuki by Mitsuyo Kakuta
- Starring: Rie Miyazawa; Sosuke Ikematsu; Satomi Kobayashi; Yuko Oshima
- Cinematography: Makoto Shiguma
- Release dates: October 2014 (Tokyo International Film Festival); November 15, 2014 (Japan)
- Running time: 126 minutes
- Country: Japan
- Language: Japanese

Pale Moon (紙の月, Kami no Tsuki) is a 2014 Japanese crime drama film directed by Daihachi Yoshida and based on a novel by Mitsuyo Kakuta.

== Plot ==
In Japan, in the post- bubble recession of the 1990s, a forty-year-old bank employee, Rika Umezawa, begins an extramarital affair with a university student, Kōta Hirabayashi. The young man's financial difficulties, due to the university fees he has to pay, push the woman to constantly extort money from the bank where she works. Taking a liking to it, she begins to use the clients' money for evenings out in luxury restaurants and five-star hotels. However, the situation ends up getting out of hand, causing her to fall into a vortex of lies and deceit.

== Cast ==
- Rie Miyazawa
- Sosuke Ikematsu
- Satomi Kobayashi
- Yuko Oshima
- Seiichi Tanabe
- Yoshimasa Kondo
- Renji Ishibashi

== Reception ==
It will be in competition at the 27th Tokyo International Film Festival. Rie Miyazawa was nominated for the Asian Film Award for Best Actress at the 9th Asian Film Awards.
