= Thermae Romae II =

- Poster
- Directed by: Hideki Takeuchi
- Based on: Thermae Romae by Mari Yamazaki
- Starring: Hiroshi Abe; Aya Ueto; Kazuki Kitamura; Takashi Sasano
- Release date: April 26, 2014 (Japan)
- Running time: 112 minutes
- Country: Japan
- Language: Japanese
- Box office: ¥4.42 billion (Japan) $271,666 (overseas)

Thermae Romae II (テルマエ・ロマエＩＩ) is a 2014 Japanese comedy film directed by Hideki Takeuchi and based on the manga series Thermae Romae by Mari Yamazaki.

== Synopsis ==
Some time later, Mami's manga about Lucius is published and becomes popular enough for a movie to be produced about it. She visits the set and meets the actor playing Lucius. Suddenly, the real Lucius appears out of a nearby well, calling the actor an impostor.

== Cast ==
- Hiroshi Abe
- Aya Ueto
- Kazuki Kitamura
- Takashi Sasano
- Anthony Ripoll
- Katsuya
- Akebono Tarō
- Kotoōshū Katsunori

== Reception ==
The film has grossed ¥4.42 billion in Japan.
