= Cape Nostalgia =

- Poster
- Directed by: Izuru Narushima
- Screenplay by: Teruo Abe; Masato Katō
- Based on: Niji no Misaki no Kissaten by Akio Morisawa
- Produced by: Sayuri Yoshinaga; Riuko Tominaga; Ryo Kawata; Arimasa Okada; Hiroshi Furukawa
- Starring: Sayuri Yoshinaga; Hiroshi Abe; Yūko Takeuchi; Tsurube Shōfukutei
- Cinematography: Mutsuo Naganuma
- Edited by: Hideaki Ohata
- Music by: Goro Yasukawa
- Distributed by: Toei Company
- Release dates: August 29, 2014 (Montréal World); October 11, 2014 (Japan)
- Running time: 117 minutes
- Country: Japan
- Language: Japanese
- Box office: ¥512 million (Japan)

Cape Nostalgia (Japanese: ふしぎな岬の物語, Hepburn: Fushigi na misaki no monogatari) is a 2014 Japanese drama film directed by Izuru Narushima. It was released on October 11. The film is based on the novel Niji no Misaki no Kissaten (Japanese: 虹の岬の喫茶店, Hepburn: Teahouse of the Rainbow Cape) by Akio Morisawa.

== Cast ==
- Sayuri Yoshinaga
- Hiroshi Abe
- Yūko Takeuchi
- Shōfukutei Tsurube II

== Reception ==
The film has grossed ¥512 million at the Japanese box office.
