= List of Japanese films of 2012 =

== Highest-grossing films ==
Rank	Title	Gross
1	Brave Hearts: Umizaru	¥7.33 billion
2	Thermae Romae	¥5.98 billion
3	Bayside Shakedown: The Final	¥5.97 billion
4	Evangelion: 3.0 You Can (Not) Redo	¥5.30 billion
5	Wolf Children	¥4.22 billion

== List of films ==
A list of Japanese films that are released in the Japanese box office in 2012.

The film A Letter to Momo became the first anime film to be screened at the Warsaw International Film Festival. The 2012 films Ai to Makoto and 11.25 Jiketsu no Hi: Mishima Yukio to Wakamono-Tachi will be screened in the 2012 Cannes Film Festival.

Opening	Title	Director	Cast	Genre	Notes	Ref
7 January	Magic Tree House	Hiroshi Nishikiori	Mana Ashida, Keiko Kitagawa	Anime	Based on a children fantasy series	
7 January	Quartet!	Junichi Mimura	Mahiro Takasugi, Ayame Goriki	Drama		
7 January	Ryūjin Mabuyer The Movie Nanatsu no Mabui	Tomoki Sano	Shintaro Yamada	Tokusatsu	Based on a television series	
7 January	Tibetan Dog	Masayuki Kojima	Houko Kuwashima, Jiro Hiramiki	Anime		
14 January	Gekkō no Kamen	Itsuji Itao	Itsuji Itao, Tadanobu Asano, Satomi Ishihara	Drama	Inspired by the story Sokotsu Nagaya	
14 January	Hasami	Fujiro Mitsuishi	Chitsuru Ikewaki	Drama		
14 January	Himizu	Sion Sono	Shōta Sometani Fumi Nikaidō	Drama	Entered into the 68th Venice International Film Festival	
14 January	Robo-G	Yaguchi Shinobu	Mickey Curtis, Yoshitaka Yuriko	Drama		
21 January	.hack//The Movie	Hiroshi Matsuyama	Nanami Sakuraba	Anime	Based on a video game	
21 January	Always Sanchōme no Yūhi '64	Takashi Yamazaki	Hidetaka Yoshioka, Koyuki, Shinichi Tsutsumi, Hiroko Yakushimaru	Drama	Based on a manga	
21 January	Kaizoku Sentai Gokaiger vs. Space Sheriff Gavan: The Movie	Shojiro Nakazawa	Ryota Ozawa, Yuki Yamada, Mao Ichimichi	Tokusatsu		
27 January	Documentary of AKB48: Show must go on	Eiki Takahashi	Members of the group AKB48	Documentary	Sequel to a 2011 documentary	
28 January	Inu no Kubiwa to Koroke to	Seiki Nagahara	Kenta Kamakari, Masaya Nakamura	Drama		
28 January	Shiawase no Pan	Yukiko Mishima	Yo Oizumi, Tomoyo Harada	Drama		
28 January	Tempest 3D	Yoshiyuki Yoshimura	Yukie Nakama, Shosuke Tanihara	Drama	Continuation of a television series	
28 January	The Wings of the Kirin	Nobuhiro Doi	Hiroshi Abe, Yui Aragaki, Junpei Mizobata, Rena Tanaka		Based on a novel	
4 February	Arakawa Under the Bridge	Ken Iizuka	Kento Hayashi, Mirei Kiritani	Drama	Based on a manga	
4 February	Berserk Golden Age Arc I: Egg of the Supreme Ruler	Toshiyuki Kubooka	Hiroaki Iwanaga, Takahiro Sakurai, Toa Yukinari	Anime	Based on a manga	
4 February	Mameshiba Ichirō 3D	Toru Kamei	Jiro Sato	Drama		
4 February	Nihon Retto	Keizo Ideta	NA	Documentary		
4 February	Shinobido	Toshiyuki Morioka	Aimi Satsukawa, Hatsunori Hasegawa	Drama	Based on a theme park attraction	
4 February	Tokyo Playboy Club	Yosuke Okuda	Nao Ōmori, Ken Mitsuishi, Asami Usuda			
11 February	51 (Wuyi): Sekai de Ichiban Chīsaku Umareta Panda	Shiohama Masayuki	NA	Documentary		
11 February	Dragon Age: Dawn of the Seeker	Fumihiko Sori		Anime; Fantasy	Based on a video game	
11 February	Gyakuten Saiban	Miike Takashi	Hiroki Narimiya, Mirei Kiritani, Takumi Saito	Legal drama	Based on a video game	
11 February	Kitsutsuki to Ame	Shuichi Okita	Shun Oguri, Kōji Yakusho	Drama	Screened at the 2011 Tokyo International Film Festival	
11 February	Hayabusa: Harukanaru Kikan	Tomoyuki Takimoto	Ken Watanabe	Drama	Based on the true story of the Hayabusa spacecraft	
11 February	Life Is Dead	Kōsuke Hishinuma	Atsushi Arai, Higarino, Shintarō Akutsu	Supernatural	Based on a manga	
11 February	Utahime	Yoshiko Hoshida	Hitomi Kuroki, Tae Kimura, Shizuyo Yamazaki, Miki Maya	Drama	Based on a novel	
18 February	Afro Tanaka	Daigo Matsui	Shota Matsuda, Nozomi Sasaki		Based on a manga	
18 February	Ikiterumono wa Inainoka	Gakuryu Ishii	Shota Sometani	Doomsday		
18 February	POV: Norowareta Film	Norio Tsuruta	Mirai Shida, Haruna Kawaguchi	Horror		
18 February	Seiji: Riku no Sakana	Yūsuke Iseya	Hidetoshi Nishijima, Mirai Moriyama, Nae Yūki, Masahiko Tsugawa	Drama	Based on a novel	
25 February	Love Police	Yoshihiro Sakata	Takashi Yoshimura, Yosuke Oochi	Comedy		
25 February	Zombie Ass	Noboru Iguchi	Arisa Nakamura, Mayu Sugano	Horror		
28 February	Koun no Tsubo	Michihito Ogawa	Keiko Toda, Hosshan	Drama		
3 March	Doraemon: Nobita to Kiseki no Shima ~Animal Adventure~	Kōzō Kusuba		Anime	17th film in the Doraemon film series	
3 March	Liar Game: Saisei	Hiroki Matsuyama	Shota Matsuda, Mikako Tabe	Drama	Sequel to the film Liar Game: The Final Stage	
10 March	Fly: Heibon na Kiseki	Masahiro Kondo	Kazutoyo Koyabu, Saki Aibu, Yoichi Nukumizu	Drama		
10 March	Henge	Ohata Hajime	Kazunari Aizawa, Aki Morita	Horror		
10 March	Okaeri Hayabusa	Katsuhide Motoki	Tatsuya Fujiwara, Anne Watanabe, Tomokazu Miura	Drama	Based on the true story of the Hayabusa spacecraft	
10 March	River	Ryūichi Hiroki	Misako Renbutsu	Drama	Based on real events	
17 March	Bokura ga Ita (Part 1)	Solanin	Toma Ikuta, Yuriko Yoshitaka	Drama	Based on a manga	
17 March	Ghostwriter Hotel	Hiroaki Ito	Tsuyoshi Abe	Horror		
17 March	Ouran High School Host Club		Haruna Kawaguchi, Yusuke Yamamoto, Mariko Shinoda	Drama	Based on a manga; similar to the 2011 television drama based on the same manga	
17 March	Pretty Cure All Stars: NewStage Mirai no Tomodachi	Jyunji Shimizu	Misato Fukuen, Asami Tano	Anime	Part of the Pretty Cure All Stars film series	
17 March	Strike Witches	Kazuhiro Takamura	Misato Fukuen, Saori Eto	Anime	Based on a mixed-media project	
17 March	Tanemaku Tabibito	Toshi Shioya	Takanori Jinnai, Rena Tanaka	Drama		
24 March	Bokutachi Kyukou: A Ressha de Ikou	Yoshimitsu Morita	Kenichi Matsuyama, Eita	Drama		
24 March	Salvage Mice	Ryuta Tasaki	Mitsuki Tanimura, Julia Nagano, Seiya Osada	Action		
24 March	Ultraman Saga	Hideki Oka	DAIGO, Takeshi Tsuruno, Taiyo Sugiura	Tokusatsu		
31 March	Ano Sora no Ao	Tao Nashimoto	Masei Nakayama, Mikie Hara, Maki Aizawa	Drama		
31 March	Aoi Sora Shiroi Kumo	Shusuke Kaneko	Hikari Mori	Drama		
31 March	Ashita ni Kakeru Ai	Hideyuki Katsuki	Alex Ru, Sayaka Ichii	Drama	Collaboration with China to commemorate the 40th anniversary of the Japan-China friendship	
7 April	Atsuhime Number 1		Rika Ishikawa, Yuko Nakazawa	Drama		
7 April	Kotoko	Shinya Tsukamoto	Cocco, Shinya Tsukamoto	Horror		
7 April	Ramen Samurai	Naoki Segi	Dai Watanabe, Sayaka Yamaguchi, Yasuaki Kurata	Drama	Debuted at the 2011 Tokyo International Film Festival	
7 April	Red Tears	Takanori Tsujimoto	Natsuki Kato, Yuma Ishigaki, Yasuaki Kurata	Horror	Debuted at the 2011 Tokyo International Film Festival	
7 April	SPEC: Ten	Yukihiko Tsutsumi	Erika Toda, Ryo Kase	Drama	Continuation of a television drama series	
7 April	Totecheeta Chiquitita		Kosuke Toyohara, Chieko Matsubara, Shono Hayama, Jurina	Drama	Developed under the Fukushima Film Project	
7 April	Watashi no Ojisan	Tatsuoki Hosono	Katsunori Takahashi, Saki Terashima	Romance	Based on a novel	
14 April	Crayon Shin-chan: Arashi o Yobu! Ora to Uchū no Princess	Tsutomu Mizushima	Keiji Fujiwara, Satomi Koorogi	Anime	Based on a manga	
14 April	Detective Conan: 11 Hitome no Sutoraikā	Kobun Shizuno	Minami Takayama	Anime	Based on a manga	
14 April	Donzumari Benki	Haruhi Oguri	Nahana, Kuniaki Nakamura, Keiko Sugawara	Drama		
21 April	A Letter to Momo	Hiroyuki Okiura	Karen Miyama, Yuka, Toshiyuki Nishida,	Anime	Entered into the 2011 Toronto International Film Festival	
21 April	Bokura ga Ita (Part 2)	Solanin	Toma Ikuta, Yuriko Yoshitaka	Drama	Based on a manga	
21 April	Kamen Rider × Super Sentai: Super Hero Taisen	Osamu Kaneda	Masahiro Inoue, Ryota Ozawa	Tokusatsu		
21 April	Monsters Club	Toshiaki Toyoda	Eita, Yōsuke Kubozuka	Horror	Screened at the 2011 Toronto International Film Festival	
21 April	Sentimental Yasuko	Kei Horie	Azusa Okamoto	Drama	Adapted from a stage play of the same name	
21 April	X Game 2	Masashi Yamada	Aika Ota, Natsumi Hirajima	Horror	sequel to the 2010 film X Game	
28 April	Home: Itoshi no Zashiki Warashi	Seiji Izumi	Yutaka Mizutani	Drama	Based on a novel	
28 April	Thermae Romae		Hiroshi Abe, Aya Ueto, Masachika Ichimura	Comedy	Based on a manga	
28 April	Chronicle of My Mother	Masato Harada	Kōji Yakusho, Aoi Miyazaki, Kirin Kiki	Drama		
5 May	Uchū Kyōdai		Shun Oguri, Masaki Okada		Based on a manga	
12 May	Kono Sora no Hana	Nobuhiko Obayashi	Yasuko Matsuyuki	Drama	Based on the Nagaoka Fireworks festival	
12 May	Potechi	Yoshihiro Nakamura	Gaku Hamada, Fumino Kimura, Nao Omori	Drama	Based on a short story	
12 May	Rent a Neko	Naoko Ogigami	Mikako Ichikawa	Drama		
12 May	Sadako 3D	Tsutomu Hanabusa	Satomi Ishihara, Koji Seto	Horror	Uses characters from the Ring Trilogy	
19 May	Niji-Iro Hotaru: Eien no Natsu Yasumi	Kōnosuke Uda	Akashi Takei, Ayumi Kimura	Anime	Based on a novel	
26 May	Girl	Yoshihiro Fukagawa	Karina, Kumiko Asō		Based on a novel	
26 May	Kotsutsubo	Jiro Nagae	Natsumi Matsubara, Rurika Yokoyama, Ai Shinozaki, Yusuke Yamada	Horror	Based on a novel	
26 May	Mada, Ningen	Jumpei Matsumoto	Masato Tsujioka, Manabu Ueyama	Drama		
26 May	My House	Yukihiko Tsutsumi	Itou Takao, Eri Ishiida	Drama	Based on a novel	
2 June	11:25 The Day He Chose His Own Fate	Kōji Wakamatsu	Arata Iura	Drama		
2 June	Blood-C: The Last Dark	Naoyoshi Shiotani	Nana Mizuki, Kenji Nojima	Anime	Based on a manga	
2 June	Gaiji Keisatsu	Kentarō Horikirizono	Atsuro Watabe, Kim Kang-woo, Yōko Maki	Mystery	Based on a novel	
2 June	The Final Judgement	Masaki Hamamoto	Kota Miura, Umali Thilakarathne	Action	Based on a novel	
9 June	Hotaru no Hikari	Hiroshi Yoshino	Haruka Ayase, Naohito Fujiki	Drama	Continuation of a television series of the same name	
9 June	Michi: Hakuji no Hito	Banmei Takahashi	Yu Yoshizawa, Bae Soo-Bin	Drama	Based on a true story	
9 June	Signal: Getsuyobi no Ruka	Masaaki Taniguchi	Azusa Mine	Romance		
16 June	Ai to Makoto	Miike Takashi	Tsumabuki Satoshi, Takei Emi	Drama	Based on a manga	
16 June	Library War: The Wings of Revolution	Takayuki Hamana	Marina Inoue, Tomoaki Maeno	Anime	Based on a light novel	
16 June	Karappo	Shogo Kusano	Naoya Shimizu, Airi Taira	Drama	Debuted at the 4th Okinawa International Movie Festival	
23 June	Berserk Golden Age Arc II: The Battle for Doldrey	Toshiyuki Kubooka	Hiroaki Iwanaga, Takahiro Sakurai	Anime	Based on a manga	
23 June	Love: Masao Kun Ga Iku!	Kentaro Otani	Shingo Katori, Ryōko Hirosue, Riko Narumi	Drama		
30 June	Rinjo: Gekijoban	Hajime Hashimoto	Masaaki Uchino	Mystery	Continuation of the television series Rinjo	
7 July	Gusukobudori no Denki	Gisaburo Sugii		Anime	Based on a novel	
7 July	Kono Sora no Hana	Nobuhiko Obayashi	Yasuko Matsuyuki	Drama	Based on the Nagaoka Fireworks festival	
7 July	Soreike! Anpanman Yomigaere Bananajima	Hiroyuki Yano	Yoshino Kimura	Anime	Characters from the Anpanman series	
7 July	Soup: Umarekawari no Monogatari	Yukichi Ootsuka	Katsuhisa Namase	Supernatural		
13 July	Umizaru 4: Brave Hearts	Eiichiro Hasumi	Riisa Naka, Hideaki Itō	Action	Part of the Umizaru film series	
14 July	Chihiro Iwasaki: 27-sai no Tabidachi	Tomoko Kana	Tetsuko Kuroyanagi	Documentary	A documentary about the illustrator Chihiro Iwasaki	
14 July	Helter Skelter	Mika Ninagawa	Erika Sawajiri	Drama	Based on a manga	
14 July	Kueki Ressha	Nobuhiro Yamashita	Mirai Moriyama, Kengo Kora, Atsuko Maeda	Romance	Based on a novel	
14 July	Kyurem vs. the Sacred Swordsman: Keldeo	Kunihiko Yuyama	Rica Matsumoto, Aoi Yūki, Mamoru Miyano	Anime		
14 July	Magical Girl Lyrical Nanoha The Movie 2nd A's	Keizou Kusakawa	Yukari Tamura, Nana Mizuki	Anime; Fantasy		
14 July	Paikaji Nankai Sakusen	Toru Hosokawa	Sadao Abe	Drama	Based on a novel	
21 July	The Wolf Children Ame and Yuki	Mamoru Hosoda	Aoi Miyazaki, Takao Osawa	Anime		
28 July	Eight Ranger	Yukihiko Tsutsumi	members of the group Kanjani Eight	Drama	Based on popular skit by Kanjani Eight	
28 July	Girigiri no Onnatachi	Yukihiko Tsutsumi	Miho Fujima, Yuko Nakamura, Makiko Watanabe	Drama	Screened at the 2011 Tokyo International Film Festival	
28 July	Road to Ninja: Naruto the Movie	Hayato Date	Junko Takeuchi	Anime	Commemoration of the 10th Anniversary of Naruto animation	
4 August	Kazoku no Kuni	Yang Yong-Hi	Arata, Sakura Ando, Yang Ik-june	Drama	Based on the director's own experience	
4 August	Another	Takeshi Furusawa		Horror	Based on a novel	
11 August	Kikoeteru, Furi wo Sita Dake	Kaori Imaizumi	Hana Nonaka	Drama	Screened at the 62nd Berlin International Film Festival	
11 August	The Kirishima Thing	Daihachi Yoshida	Ryunosuke Kamiki, Masahiro Higashide	Drama		
11 August	Jewelpet the Movie: Sweets Dance Princess	Hiroaki Sakurai	Ayaka Saito, Aya Hirano, Nozomi Sasaki	Anime		
18 August	Fairy Tail the Movie: Phoenix Priestess	Masaya Fujimori	Aya Hirano, Tetsuya Kakihara	Anime	Based on a manga	
25 August	Afterschool Midnighters	Kyohitoshi Take	Koichi Yamadera	Anime		
25 August	Anata e	Yasuo Furuhata	Ken Takakura	Drama	Based on a draft left behind by the late producer Seichi Ichiko	
25 August	Ai Ore!	Sakurako Fukuyama	Karam, Ito Ono, Yūta Furukawa	Romance	Based on a manga	
25 August	Rurouni Kenshin	Keishi Otomo	Takeru Sato, Emi Takei	Drama	Based on a manga	
25 August	Ushijima the Loan Shark	Masatoshi Yamaguchi	Takayuki Yamada		Based on a manga	
1 September	I'm Flash!	Toshiaki Toyoda	Tatsuya Fujiwara, Ryuhei Matsuda	Drama		
1 September	Haizai: Kamisama No Iu Toori	Shuhei Fukunaga, Masahiro Izuo	Motoki Ochiai, Rie Tomosaka	Drama		
1 September	Himitsu no Akko-chan	Yasuhiro Kawamura	Haruka Ayase, Masaki Okada	Romance	Based on a manga	
1 September	Hitori Kakurenbo	Yasutaka Miyuki	Misato Nonaka, Taiyo Ayukawa	Horror	Based on an urban legend	
7 September	Bayside Shakedown: The Final	Katsuyuki Motohiro	Yūji Oda, Eri Fukatsu, Toshirō Yanagiba, Yūsuke Santamaria	Drama	Continuation of the Bayside Shakedown series	
8 September	Bakugyaku Famiglia	Kazuyoshi Kumakiri	Yoshimi Tokui, Kento Hayashi	Drama	Based on a manga	
8 September	Yume Uru Futari	Miwa Nishikawa	Takako Matsu, Sadao Abe	Drama		
15 September	Jinsei, Irodori	Osamu Minorikawa	Kazuko Yoshiyuki	Drama		
15 September	Kagi Dorobou no Method	Kenji Uchida	Masato Sakai, Teruyuki Kagawa, Ryōko Hirosue	Yakuza		
15 September	Tenchi Meisatsu	Yōjirō Takita	Junichi Okada	Drama	Based on the story of Shunkai Shibukawa	
22 September	Bingo	Yopei Fukuda	Kazuki Shimizu, Sakiko Matsui	Drama	Based on a novel	
22 September	The Boy Inside	Tetsu Maeda	Masaki Suda, Tori Matsuzaka	Drama	Based on a manga	
22 September	Gekijō-ban Tiger & Bunny -The Beginning	Yonetani Yoshitomo	Hirata Hiroaki, Morita Masakazu	Anime	Based on an anime series	
29 September	Muse no Kagami	Yuichi Fukuda	Rino Sashihara	Drama	Based on a NTV television series of the same name	
29 September	Asura	Keiichi Sato	Masako Nozawa, Megumi Hayashibara	Anime	Based on a manga	
6 October	Atarashii Kutsu wo Kawanakucha	Eriko Kitagawa	Miho Nakayama Osamu Mukai	Romance	Filmed in Paris	
6 October	Kuro Neko Rushi	Toru Kamei	Muga Tsukaji, Megumi Yasu	Drama		
6 October	Puella Magi Madoka Magica (Part 1)	Akiyuki Shinbo	Aoi Yuki, Chiwa Saito	Anime		
6 October	Beyond Outrage	Takeshi Kitano	Toshiyuki Nishida	Yakuza	Sequel to the 2010 film Outrage	
6 October	Tsunagu	Yuichiro Hirakawa	Tori Matsuzaka, Kirin Kiki	Drama	Based on a novel	
13 October	Hitotsu no Uta			Romance	Screened at the 2012 Tokyo International Film Festival	
13 October	Koi ni Itaru Yamai			Drama	Screened at the 62nd Berlin International Film Festival	
6 October	Puella Magi Madoka Magica (Part 2)	Akiyuki Shinbo	Aoi Yuki, Chiwa Saito	Anime		
13 October	Shiritsu Bakaleya Koko	Kubota Takashi	Members of AKB48 and Johnny's Jr.	Drama	Continuation of NTV television series of the same name	
13 October	Tabi no Okurimono	Tetsu Maeda	Yu Yamada, Kiyoshi Maekawa, Wakako Sakai	Drama		
20 October	Land of Hope	Sion Sono	Isao Natsuyagi, Naoko Otani, Jun Murakami	Drama	International film collaboration	
20 October	Fuse Teppō Musume no Torimonochō	Masayuki Miyaji		Anime		
20 October	Space Sheriff Gavan: The Movie		Yuma Ishigaki, Kenji Ohba	Tokusatsu		
27 October	009 Re:Cyborg	Kenji Kamiyama	Mamoru Miyano	Anime	Based on the manga Cyborg 009	
27 October	Tabi no Okurimono: Ashita e	Tetsu Maeda	Kiyoshi Maekawa, Wakako Sakai, Yu Yamada	Drama		
27 October	A Terminal Trust	Masayuki Suo	Tamiyo Kusakari, Kōji Yakusho	Drama	Based on a novel	
2 November	Nobo no Shiro	Shinji Higuchi, Isshin Inudo	Kōichi Satō, Hiroki Narimiya, Mana Ashida	Period	Based on a novel	
3 November	Kita no Kanariatachi	Junji Sakamoto	Sayuri Yoshinaga	Drama	Based on the novel Oufuku Shokan	
3 November	Ogon O Daite Tobe	Kazuyuki Izutsu	Satoshi Tsumabuki, Tadanobu Asano	Thriller	Based on a novel	
10 November	Lesson of the Evil	Miike Takashi	Hideaki Itō	Mystery	Based on a novel	
10 November	Neraware Gakuen	Ryosuke Nakamura (director)		Anime	Based on a science fiction novel	
10 November	Yukuefumei	Koji Kawano	Riho Takagi	Horror		
17 November	Evangelion 3.0	Hideaki Anno		Anime	Third film in the Rebuild of Evangelion film series	
17 November	Sono Yoru no Samurai	Masaaki Akahori	Masato Sakai, Takayuki Yamada	Drama	Based on a 2007 stage play	
23 November	Karasu no Oyayubi	Tadafumi Itō	Hiroshi Abe, Shoji Murakami, Satomi Ishihara		Based on a novel	
23 November	Tsunahiichatta!	Nobuo Mizuta	Mao Inoue, Keiko Matsuzaka	Drama	Inspired by actual events	
8 December	Kyo, Koi wo Hajimemasu	Takeshi Furusawa	Emi Takei, Tori Matsuzaka	Romance	Based on a manga	
15 December	Good Morning Everyone!	Toru Yamamoto	Yo Oizumi, Kumiko Asō, Ayaka Miyoshi	Drama		
15 December	One Piece: Film Z	Tatsuya Nagamine	Mayumi Tanaka, Kazuya Nakai, Akemi Okamura	Anime	Part of the One Piece film series	
15 December	Yōkai Ningen Bem		Kazuya Kamenashi, Anne Watanabe	Drama	Based on a manga; continuation of a 2011 television drama	
22 December	Odayaka na Nichijo	Nobuteru Uchida	Kiki Sugino, Yukiko Shinohara	Drama		
22 December	Ōoku: Emonnosuke Tsunayoshi Hen	Fuminori Kaneko	Hideaki Itō	Drama	Based on a manga	
	Gothicmade	Mamoru Nagano	Maria Kawamura, Nozomu Sasaki	Anime		
	Graffreeter Toki	Kenichi Fujiwara	Rie Kitahara	Comedy	Inspired by a manga	
	Kamihate Shōten	Tatsuya Yamamoto	Reiko Takahashi	Drama	Screened at the 47th Karlovy Vary International Film Festival	
	Little Maestro	Toshiro Saiga	Kasumi Arimura, Yumiko Shaku	Drama		
	Tenjo no kaze	Yann Kung	Sachiko Fukumoto, Honoka, J.C. Chan, Tsuyoshi Hayashi	Drama	Okinawa and China collaboration	
