= 36th Japan Academy Film Prize =

Japanese film awards in 2013

- Date: March 8, 2013
- Site: Grand Prince Hotel New Takanawa, Tokyo, Japan
- Hosted by: Tsutomu Sekine; Mao Inoue

Highlights
- Best Picture: The Kirishima Thing
- Most nominations: Chronicle of My Mother (12)

The 36th Japan Academy Film Prize (第36回日本アカデミー賞) is the 36th edition of the Japan Academy Film Prize, an award presented by the Nippon Academy-Sho Association to award excellence in filmmaking. It awarded the best films of 2012 and it took place on March 8, 2013 at the Grand Prince Hotel New Takanawa in Tokyo, Japan.

== Nominees ==
=== Awards ===
Picture of the Year	Animation of the Year
The Kirishima Thing; Anata e; A Chorus of Angels; The Floating Castle; Chronicle of My Mother	Wolf Children; Evangelion: 3.0 You Can (Not) Redo; A Letter to Momo; Friends: Mononoke Shima no Naki; One Piece Film: Z
Director of the Year	Screenplay of the Year
Daihachi Yoshida – The Kirishima Thing; Isshin Inudo and Shinji Higuchi – The Floating Castle; Junji Sakamoto – A Chorus of Angels; Masato Harada – Chronicle of My Mother; Yasuo Furuhata – Anata e	Kenji Uchida – Key of Life; Takeshi Aoshima – Anata e; Kōhei Kiyasu and Daihachi Yoshida – The Kirishima Thing; Machiko Nasu – A Chorus of Angels; Masato Harada – Chronicle of My Mother
Outstanding Performance by an Actor in a Leading Role	Outstanding Performance by an Actress in a Leading Role
Hiroshi Abe – Thermae Romae; Masato Sakai – Key of Life; Mansai Nomura – The Floating Castle; Mirai Moriyama – Kueki Ressha; Kōji Yakusho – Isoroku; Kōji Yakusho – Chronicle of My Mother	Kirin Kiki – Chronicle of My Mother; Tamiyo Kusakari – A Terminal Trust; Erika Sawajiri – Helter Skelter; Takako Matsu – Dreams for Sale; Sayuri Yoshinaga – A Chorus of Angels
Outstanding Performance by an Actor in a Supporting Role	Outstanding Performance by an Actress in a Supporting Role
Hideji Ōtaki – Anata e; Teruyuki Kagawa – Key of Life; Kengo Kora – Kueki Ressha; Kōichi Satō – Anata e; Kōichi Satō – The Floating Castle; Mirai Moriyama – A Chorus of Angels	Kimiko Yo – Anata e; Shinobu Terajima – Helter Skelter; Ryōko Hirosue – Key of Life; Hikari Mitsushima – A Chorus of Angels; Aoi Miyazaki – Chronicle of My Mother
Popularity Award	Newcomer of the Year
Yuko Oshima – Yamikin Ushijima-kun (Actor Category); The Kirishima Thing (Production Category)	Emi Takei – Rurouni Kenshin, Ai to Makoto, Kyō, Koi o Hajimemasu; Fumi Nikaidō – Himizu and Lesson of the Evil; Ai Hashimoto – The Kirishima Thing, Home Itoshi no Zashikiwarashi, Another; Shōta Sometani – Himizu and Lesson of the Evil; Changmin (TVXQ) – Ōgon o Idaite Tobe; Masahiro Higashide – The Kirishima Thing; Tori Matsuzaka – Tsunagu, The Wings of the Kirin, Kyō, Koi o Hajimemasu
Outstanding Achievement in Music	Outstanding Achievement in Cinematography
Ikuko Kawai – A Chorus of Angels; Kōji Ueno – The Floating Castle; Joe Hisaishi – Tenchi: The Samurai Astronomer; Harumi Fūki – Chronicle of My Mother	Daisaku Kimura – A Chorus of Angels; Akiko Ashizawa – Chronicle of My Mother; Motonobu Kiyoku and Shōji Ehara – The Floating Castle; Takeshi Hamada – Tenchi: The Samurai Astronomer; Junichirō Hayashi – Anata e
Outstanding Achievement in Lighting Direction	Outstanding Achievement in Art Direction
Takashi Sugimoto – A Chorus of Angels; Hidenori Nagata – Chronicle of My Mother; Takashi Sugimoto – The Floating Castle; Kiyoto Andō – Tenchi: The Samurai Astronomer; Yūki Nakamura – Anata e	Norihiro Isoda and Nariyuki Kondō – The Floating Castle; Mitsuo Harada – Thermae Romae; Kyōko Heya – Tenchi: The Samurai Astronomer; Kyōko Yauchi – Anata e; Hidemitsu Yamazaki – Chronicle of My Mother
Outstanding Achievement in Sound Recording	Outstanding Achievement in Film Editing
Fumio Hashimoto – Isoroku; Osamu Onodera – Tenchi: The Samurai Astronomer; Junichi Shima – A Chorus of Angels; Junichi Shima – The Floating Castle; Tsutomu Honda – Anata e; Shōwa Matsumoto and Masato Yano – Chronicle of My Mother	Mototaka Kusakabe – The Kirishima Thing; Sōichi Ueno – The Floating Castle; Junichi Kikuchi – Anata e; Yūjin Harada – Chronicle of My Mother; Shinichi Fushima – A Chorus of Angels
Outstanding Foreign Language Film	Special Award from the Chairman
The Intouchables; Argo; The Dark Knight Rises; The Girl with the Dragon Tattoo; Skyfall	Kaneto Shindo (Director and Scriptwriter); Fumio Hashimoto (Recording Technician); Mitsuko Mori (Actress); Isuzu Yamada (Actress); Kōji Wakamatsu (Director)
Special Award from the Association	Award for Distinguished Service from the Chairman
Okayasu Promotion (Negative Film Editing); Sanyō Henshūshitsu (Negative Film Editing); Toshio Sugawara (Fight Director); Masao Baba (Art Management); Masae Miyamoto (Costume)	Work for Bayside Shakedown series
Shigeru Okada Prize	Special Award of Honour from the Association
Central Arts	Yoji Yamada (Director)
