= 34th Yokohama Film Festival =

2013 film festival in Yokohama, Japan

- Location: Yokohama, Kanagawa, Japan
- Founded: 1980
- Festival date: 2013

The 34th Yokohama Film Festival (第34回ヨコハマ映画祭) was held in 2013 in Yokohama, Kanagawa, Japan.

== Awards ==
- Best Film: - The Kirishima Thing
- Best Director: Daihachi Yoshida - The Kirishima Thing
- Yoshimitsu Morita Memorial Best New Director:
  - Masaaki Akahori - The Samurai That Night
  - Yang Yong-hi - Our Homeland
- Best Screenplay: Kenji Uchida - Key of Life
- Best Cinematographer: Ryūto Kondō - The Kirishima Thing
- Best Actor: Hiroshi Abe - Thermae Romae
- Best Actress: Takako Matsu - Dreams for Sale
- Best Supporting Actor: Takayuki Yamada - The Samurai That Night, The Floating Castle, Lesson of the Evil
- Best Supporting Actress: Sakura Ando - Ai to Makoto, The Samurai That Night
- Best Newcomer:
  - Masataka Kubota - The Cowards Who Looked to the Sky, Hasami
  - Ai Hashimoto - The Kirishima Thing, Another, Until the Break of Dawn, Home: The House Imp
  - Azusa Mine - Signal: Getsuyōbi no Ruka
- Examiner Special Award: Wolf Children director Mamoru Hosoda and production team
- Special Grand Prize: Nobuhiko Obayashi

== Best 10 ==
1. The Kirishima Thing
2. Key of Life
3. Casting Blossoms to the Sky
4. A Terminal Trust
5. Wolf Children
6. Himizu
7. Our Homeland
8. Dreams for Sale
9. Oretachi Kyūkou A Ressha de Ikou
10. The Cowards Who Looked to the Sky, Chronicle of My Mother

runner-up: Ai to Makoto
