= Japan Academy Film Prize for Picture of the Year =

Japanese film award

- Awarded for: Best feature film of Japan
- Country: Japan
- Presented by: Japan Academy Film Prize Association
- First award: 1978
- Website: http://www.japan-academy-prize.jp/

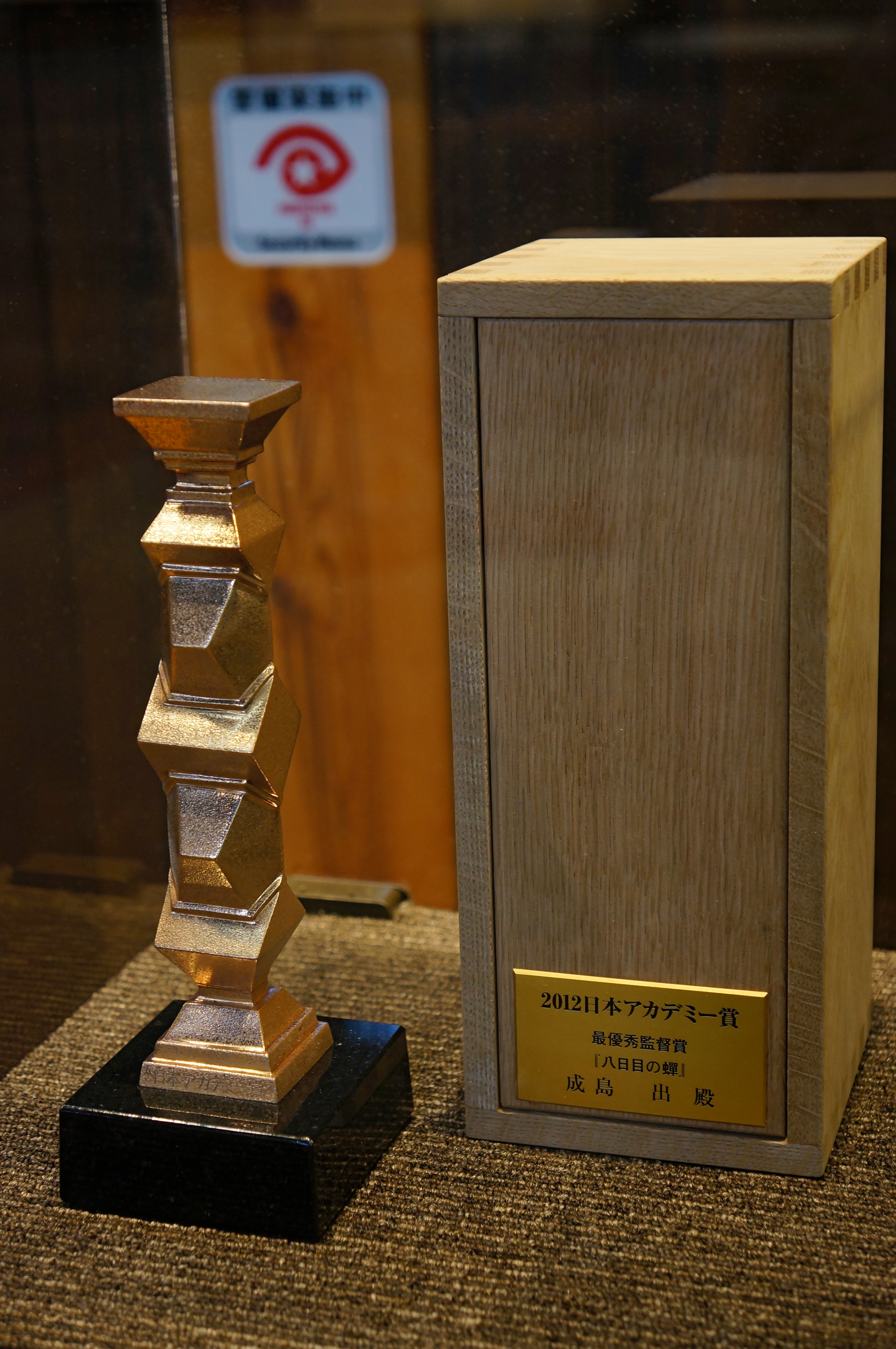
Trophy of the Japan Academy Prize

The Japan Academy Film Prize for Picture of the Year is a film award given to the best film at the annual Japan Academy Film Prize.

Nr.	English title	Japanese title	Director(s)
1st (1978)	The Yellow Handkerchief	幸福の黄色いハンカチ	Yoji Yamada
2nd (1979)	The Incident	事件	Yoshitarō Nomura
3rd (1980)	Vengeance Is Mine	復讐するは我にあり	Shōhei Imamura
4th (1981)	Zigeunerweisen	ツィゴイネルワイゼン	Seijun Suzuki
5th (1982)	Station	駅 STATION	Yasuo Furuhata
6th (1983)	Fall Guy	蒲田行進曲	Kinji Fukasaku
7th (1984)	The Ballad of Narayama	楢山節考	Shōhei Imamura
8th (1985)	The Funeral	お葬式	Juzo Itami
9th (1986)	Gray Sunset	花いちもんめ	Shunya Itō
10th (1987)	House on Fire	火宅の人	Kinji Fukasaku
11th (1988)	A Taxing Woman	マルサの女	Juzo Itami
12th (1989)	The Silk Road	敦煌	Junya Sato
13th (1990)	Black Rain	黒い雨	Shōhei Imamura
14th (1991)	Childhood Days	少年時代	Masahiro Shinoda
15th (1992)	My Sons	息子	Yoji Yamada
16th (1993)	Sumo Do, Sumo Don't	シコふんじゃった。	Masayuki Suo
17th (1994)	A Class to Remember	学校	Yoji Yamada
18th (1995)	Crest of Betrayal	忠臣蔵外伝 四谷怪談	Kinji Fukasaku
19th (1996)	A Last Note	午後の遺言状	Kaneto Shindo
20th (1997)	Shall We Dance?	Shall we ダンス?	Masayuki Suo
21st (1998)	Princess Mononoke	もののけ姫	Hayao Miyazaki
22nd (1999)	Begging for Love	愛を乞うひと	Hideyuki Hirayama
23rd (2000)	Poppoya	鉄道員	Yasuo Furuhata
24th (2001)	After the Rain	雨あがる	Takashi Koizumi
25th (2002)	Spirited Away	千と千尋の神隠し	Hayao Miyazaki
26th (2003)	The Twilight Samurai	たそがれ清兵衛	Yoji Yamada
27th (2004)	When the Last Sword Is Drawn	壬生義士伝	Yōjirō Takita
28th (2005)	Half a Confession	半落ち	Kiyoshi Sasabe
29th (2006)	Always Sanchōme no Yūhi	ALWAYS 三丁目の夕日	Takashi Yamazaki
30th (2007)	Hula Girls	フラガール	Sang-il Lee
31st (2008)	Tokyo Tower: Mom and Me, and Sometimes Dad	東京タワー 〜オカンとボクと、時々、オトン〜	Joji Matsuoka
32nd (2009)	Departures	おくりびと	Yōjirō Takita
33rd (2010)	The Unbroken	沈まぬ太陽	Setsuro Wakamatsu
34th (2011)	Confessions	告白	Tetsuya Nakashima
35th (2012)	Rebirth	八日目の蝉	Izuru Narushima
36th (2013)	The Kirishima Thing	桐島、部活やめるってよ	Daihachi Yoshida
37th (2014)	The Great Passage	舟を編む	Yuya Ishii
38th (2015)	The Eternal Zero	永遠の0	Takashi Yamazaki
39th (2016)	Our Little Sister	海街diary	Hirokazu Kore-eda
40th (2017)	Shin Godzilla	シン・ゴジラ	Hideaki Anno and Shinji Higuchi
41st (2018)	The Third Murder	三度目の殺人	Hirokazu Kore-eda
42nd (2019)	Shoplifters	万引き家族	Hirokazu Kore-eda
43rd (2020)	The Journalist	新聞記者	Michihito Fujii
44th (2021)	Midnight Swan	ミッドナイトスワン	Eiji Uchida
45th (2022)	Drive My Car	ドライブ・マイ・カー	Ryusuke Hamaguchi
46th (2023)	A Man	ある男	Kei Ishikawa
47th (2024)	Godzilla Minus One	ゴジラ-1.0	Takashi Yamazaki
48th (2025)	A Samurai in Time	侍タイムスリッパ―	Jun'ichi Yasuda
49th (2026)	Kokuho	国宝	Sang-il Lee
