= Kamikaze Taxi =

- Film poster
- Directed by: Masato Harada
- Written by: Masato Harada
- Produced by: Akio Nanjo; Kazunori Okada; Narihiko Yoshida; Susumu Tanaka; Yoshinori Moniwa
- Starring: Kōji Yakusho; Kazuya Takahashi; Reiko Kataoka; Takeshi Caesar; Mickey Curtis; Taketoshi Naito
- Cinematography: Yoshitaka Sakamoto
- Edited by: Hirohide Abe
- Music by: Masahiro Kawasaki
- Production company: Pony Canyon
- Release date: April 25, 1995 (Japan)
- Running time: 185 minutes (Japanese home video cut); 169 minutes (Japanese theatrical cut); 140 minutes (international cut)
- Country: Japan
- Language: Japanese

Kamikaze Taxi (Japanese: 復讐の天使, Hepburn: Fukushu no Tenshi; lit. Angel of Vengeance) (also released and stylized as KAMIKAZE TAXI in Japan) is a 1995 Japanese action crime film written and directed by Masato Harada.

The film was released in Japan on April 25, 1995 and shown at the 1995 London Film Festival. Mickey Curtis won the 1996 Kinema Junpo Award for Best Supporting Actor for his work in the film.

== Premise ==
Tatsuo (Kazuya Takahashi), an up-and-coming yakuza gangster, sends his prostitute and girlfriend Renko to service corrupt senator Domon (Taketoshi Naito). The politician has a taste for torture and beats her. When Renko protests her treatment, she is killed in front of Tatsuo by crime boss Animaru (Mickey Curtis). Tatsuo seeks revenge for her killing. He and his gang vandalize Domon's house and steal 2 million dollars hidden in his safe. In retaliation, Tatsuo's bosses put a hit out on them. Tatsuo flees in a taxi driven by Peruvian-Japanese Kantake (Kōji Yakusho). Kantake has recently returned to Japan after living in South America for decades. He is struggling to cope with poverty and the prejudices of native-born Japanese. As they flee, Tatsuo plans a "kamikaze" mission to kill his bosses and Domon. The relationship between Tatsuo and Kantake unexpectedly deepens as Tatsuo gets closer to his goal.

== Cast ==
- Kōji Yakusho as Kantake
- Kazuya Takahashi as Tatsuo
- Reiko Kataoka as Renko
- Kenichi Yajima as Ishida
- Mickey Curtis as Animaru
- Taketoshi Naito as Domon
- Toshi Shioya as Near-death experience lecturer
- Tomorowo Taguchi as Chaplin impersonator
- Chika Nakagami as Renko
- Toshie Negishi as Loud-mouthed taxi passenger
- Takeshi Caesar
- Eiji Ôki
- Isako Saneyoshi
- Miyako Takagi
- Tetsu Watanabe

== Production ==
The soundtrack for Kamikaze Taxi was composed by Masahiro Kawasaki. To represent Yakusho's Peruvian-Japanese taxi driver character, director Harada had Kawasaki listen to tapes of Peruvian music to come up with a similar sound. Kawasaki ultimately used Peruvian pipes in the creation of his score.

== Release ==
Kamikaze Taxi was released in Japan on April 25, 1995. The film was also shown at the 1995 London Film Festival.

Originally intended for the home video market, the film was distributed in that format in a 185 minute cut split into two parts. This was edited down to 169 minutes for the Japanese theatrical release. Kamikaze Taxi was further edited to 140 minutes for its international release.

== Reception ==
Time Magazine stated that "The narrative is overly long (160 minutes) and lacks cohesion. But the film has an epic lunacy, a satiric darkness. Its neon-lit nightscapes and vivid brutality dance, shock--and leave the viewer both riveted and repulsed." Variety also commented on the film's length, noting "Though the film could easily lose a quarter of an hour from a self-indulgent sequence in a group-therapy clinic, there's actually very little slackness during the 170-minute running time."

== Awards ==
Mickey Curtis won the 1996 Kinema Junpo Award for best supporting actor for his work in the film. The film was also listed at No. 8 in Kinema's Best Ten list for 1995. In addition, Reiko Kataoka won the 15th Yokohama Film Festival Best Newcomer Award for her performance.
