= Re-Main =

Japanese anime television series

- Key visual
- Genre: Sports (Water polo)
- Created by: Masafumi Nishida; Bandai Namco Arts; MAPPA
- Anime television series
- Directed by: Masafumi Nishida (Note: Chief director (総監督).); Kiyoshi Matsuda
- Written by: Masafumi Nishida
- Music by: Kana Utatane
- Studio: MAPPA
- Licensed by: Crunchyroll: SA/SEA: Medialink
- Original network: ANN (TV Asahi)
- Original run: July 4, 2021 – October 3, 2021
- Episodes: 12
- icon

Re-Main (stylized in all caps) is an original Japanese anime television series animated by MAPPA directed by Kiyoshi Matsuda, and written by Masafumi Nishida. The series aired from July to October 2021 on TV Asahi's NUMAnimation block.

== Plot ==
During Winter of his third middle school year, water polo star Minato Kiyomizu got caught in an accident and has been in coma ever since. Exactly 203 days later, Minato regained his consciousness, but lost three years of his memories. Due to a certain reason, he decided to go back to water polo, but has no memories of his skill, let alone the sports' rules. Thus, Minato's efforts to catch up on what he has lost begins.

== Characters ==
=== Yamanami High School ===
Minato Kiyomizu (清水 みなと, Kiyomizu Minato)
Voiced by: Yūto Uemura (Japanese); Robbie Daymond (English)
Minato was a water polo prodigy during his middle school days. During ninth grade, he made a bet with a fellow water polo athlete, Chinu Kawakubo, that if he could become Japan's top water polo athlete, she would go out with him. If Minato lost, he would pay eleven thousand yen (actually ten thousand, but with tax). Due to an accident, he ends up forgetting his memories of the past three years, including that of the bet and his water polo experience. After a chance encounter with Chinu, she offers him another chance: Minato has to go back to water polo and become Japan's top athlete or pay her double their original bet. He lives with his mother, father and little sister, Asumi who he's very close with. They run a small denim shop which doubles as their house.
Eitarō Oka (岡 栄太郎, Oka Eitarō)
Voiced by: Koutaro Nishiyama (Japanese); Caleb Yen (English)
Minato's junior in middle school who claims to know well about Minato. He's chasing Minato to his current high school just to see him in water polo again and is knowledgeable about the sport. It is revealed that past Minato barely knows him well; Eitarō lied and decided to quit the water polo club upon discovering that Minato isn't a water polo genius. After Minato convinced Eitarō that Minato is just a hard worker not a genius, Eitarō decided to continue water polo and supports Minato.
Jō Jōjima (城島 譲, Jōjima Jō)
Voiced by: Subaru Kimura (Japanese); Mark Allen Jr. (English)
A third year student and the captain of Yamanami High's water polo club. He was the sole member until Minato and others joined.
Chinu Kawakubo (川窪 ちぬ, Kawakubo Chinu)
Voiced by: Lynn (Japanese); Sarah Roach (English)
Shūgo Amihama (網浜 秀吾, Amihama Shūgo)
Voiced by: Soma Saito (Japanese); David Matranga (English)
Shūgo is a fast swimmer who started to swim to beat his older brother, who revealed to be Riku Momosaki. After Riku switched into water polo, Shūgo decided to stop anything related to swimming before Jō and others recruited him.
Takekazu Ejiri (江尻 武一, Ejiri Takekazu)
Voiced by: Makoto Furukawa (Japanese); Billy Kametz (English)
Yutaka Babayaro Inomata (猪俣 ババヤロ 豊, Inomata Babayaro Yutaka)
Voiced by: Tasuku Hatanaka (Japanese); Lee George (English)
A mixed-race member who makes sweets. He joined the team after hearing Minato's speech about his memory loss and expectations people have about him, and feeling moved as a result.
Yoshiharu Ushimado (牛窓 善晴, Ushimado Yoshiharu)
Voiced by: Daisuke Hirose (Japanese); Y. Chang (English)
A member who speaks in really small voice. He initially joined the club as a result of peer pressure from his boisterous classmates, but gradually warmed up to everyone, and gained self-confidence through his experiences in the team.

=== Shogakukan High School ===
Keita Kakihana (垣花 慶太, Kakihana Keita)
Voiced by: Taku Yashiro (Japanese); Brandon McInnis (English)
Riku Momosaki (百崎 陸, Momozaki Riku)
Voiced by: Yuma Uchida (Japanese); Jonah Scott (English)
Kōki Toguchi (渡久地 光輝, Toguchi Kōki)
Voiced by: Shun Miyazato (Japanese); Jordan Dash Cruz (English)
Akimitsu Bizen (備前 昭充, Bizen Akimitsu)
Voiced by: Hikaru Midorikawa (Japanese); Brian Mathis (English)

=== Rikka Academy ===
Takeshi Toyama (富山 健, Toyama Takeshi)
Voiced by: Natsuki Hanae (Japanese); Kyle Igneczi (English)
Akihisa Fukui (福井 晃久, Fukui Akihisa)
Voiced by: Mahiro Takasugi (Japanese); Jessie James Grelle (English)
Norimichi Ishikawa (石川 則道, Ishikawa Norimichi)
Voiced by: Yoshitsugu Matsuoka (Japanese); Aleks Le (English)

== Production and release ==
The series was announced on March 4, 2021. It was directed by Kiyoshi Matsuda, written by Masafumi Nishida, who also served as the chief director and sound director, with Kaori Futō providing the original character designs, Shiho Tanaka adapting the designs for animation, and music composed by Kana Utatane. It aired from July 4 to October 3, 2021, on TV Asahi's NUMAnimation block. Enhypen performed the series' opening theme song "Forget Me Not", while Shugo Nakamura performed the series' ending theme song "Kowareta Sekai no Byōshin wa". Funimation licensed the series. Medialink has licensed the series in Southeast Asia and South Asia, and is streaming it on their Ani-One YouTube channel, iQIYI, and Bilibili.

On September 24, 2021, Funimation announced that the series would receive an English dub, which premiered the following day. Following Sony's acquisition of Crunchyroll, the series was moved to Crunchyroll.

== Episode list ==
No.	Title (Note: All English title are taken from Funimation.)	Directed by	Written by	Storyboarded by	Original release date
1	"Sorry, Who Are You?"; Transliteration: "Gomennasai, Dare Desu ka" (Japanese: ごめんなさい、誰ですか)	Kiyoshi Matsuda; Kōki Aoshima	Masafumi Nishida	Kiyoshi Matsuda	July 4, 2021 (Note: This episode aired at 1:40 a.m. JST, 10 minutes after the original air time on TV Asahi.)
After being hospitalized for 203 days following a car accident, Minato Kiyomizu awakens from a coma, having lost his memories of the past three years—including his time playing water polo in middle school, a period during which his team won the nationally renowned Momotaro Cup. After four months of rehabilitation, Minato is discharged from the hospital and learns that his three teammates from middle school (Keita Kakihana, Koki Toguchi, and Riku Momosaki) matriculated to Shogakukan High School and managed to win Inter-Highs in their first year. While reading about Shogakukan, Minato is approached by Eitarō Oka, an old friend whom Minato does not remember. Eitarō declares his plan to enroll in the same high school in which Minato enrolls so that they can play water polo together. After eight months of intense study, Minato is admitted to Yamanami High School. On the first day, water polo captain Jō Jōjima recognizes Minato and chases him in hopes of recruiting him for the team. As Minato hides, he is spotted by an attractive girl named Chinu Kawakubo, who kisses him on the cheek.
2	"I'm No Prodigy"; Transliteration: "Boku wa Tensai Ja nai" (Japanese: 僕は天才じゃない)	Kōki Aoshima	Masafumi Nishida	Shigeyuki Miya	July 11, 2021
Chinu explains that she kissed Minato because of a deal they'd made before Minato won the Momotaro Cup; she had agreed to kiss him if he could become Japan's best middle-school water polo player. However, Chinu reveals that there was a second half of the deal: she'd promised to start dating Minato if he became Japan's best high-school player, though he agreed to pay her 220,000 yen if he was unable to fulfill this goal. Hearing this, Minato decides to get back into the sport and work toward being the best. Jō uses the story of Minato's previous successes in water polo to attract new members to the club, but all but two boys in the crowd of interested students disperse after learning Minato has lost his memories of how to play. The two remaining boys, Yutaka Inomata and Yoshiharu Ushimado, agree to join the water polo team. Additionally, a student named Takekazu Ejiri expresses interest in joining, though he asks to be assigned the position of keeper, which Jō says he has already assigned to himself. To decide who gets the position, Takekazu and Jō compete in a penalty shootout with Minato as the shooter. While Minato seems initially unskilled, he demonstrates slight potential during the contest but pulls a muscle before the shootout can conclude. After witnessing Jō's remarkable skill, Takekazu becomes discouraged and prepares to resign from the team, though Jō ultimately convinces him to stay. As the episode concludes, Jō announces plans to recruit ace swimmer Shugo Amihama right before the team subsequently discovers that Amihama has already signed up for the track team.
3	"But, Give Us a Hendy"; Transliteration: "Demo Hende Kudese" (Japanese: でもへんでくでせ)	Yasunori Gotō	Masafumi Nishida	Masayuki☆Miyaji	July 25, 2021 (Note: This episode aired at 2:00 a.m. JST, 30 minutes after the original air time on TV Asahi.)
After discovering that Amihama hasn't actually signed up for the track team and is only sampling a variety of clubs, Minato suggests that he try the water polo club since they still need a seventh member; but Amihama vehemently refuses before walking off. The team attempts various antics to convince Amihama to join, only for their persistence to anger him even more. To get them to stop asking him to join, Amihama challenges the team to a race with the stipulation that they must leave him alone if he wins. Though Amihama allows the team a 20-second head start, he still manages to outpace them and claim victory.
4	"This Ain't Looking Good..."; Transliteration: "Nanka Yabai ka mo......" (Japanese: なんかヤバいかも……)	Kōnosuke Uda	Masafumi Nishida	Shigeyuki Miya	August 1, 2021 (Note: This episode aired at 1:35 a.m. JST, 5 minutes after the original air time on TV Asahi.)
At the team's insistence, Amihama reveals his reason for disliking water polo is that he always wanted to beat his brother at a sport; but after his brother quit swimming, the only sport at which Amihama's skill rivaled his, Amihama quit swimming as well and has refused to get back in the water. After an incensed exit by Amihama, Minato's former teammates Keita, Koki, and Riku visit Yamanami High and meet Minato's new team. Just as the team laments having failed to secure a seventh member, Amihama reappears and says he's now interested in joining the team—revealing that Riku is actually his brother and that he now wants to be a part of Yamanami's water polo team so that he can have a chance of defeating Riku at a sport. The Yamanami team begins practicing, even as the captain of the neighboring Rikka Gakuen Academy's team dismisses them as non-threatening. When the Yamanami team enjoys a moment of bonding, Jō reveals that he has arranged a practice match against another team for the upcoming weekend (a feat accomplished in part due to Chinu's requesting it of Rikka Gakuen's captain). At the last minute, however, the Rikka Gakuen High School team withdraws; and the Junior High team plays in their stead, a strategy by the High School team to prevent Yamanami from seeing their ability before an official match. Despite a seeming advantage in size, Yamanami's members find it difficult to keep up with the Rikka Gakuen juniors.
5	"Dude, That's Scary!!!"; Transliteration: "Iya Kowai wa!!!" (Japanese: いや怖いわ！！！)	Tomoko Hiramuki	Masafumi Nishida	Kiyoshi Matsuda	August 8, 2021 (Note: This episode aired at 1:45 a.m. JST, 15 minutes after the original air time on TV Asahi.)
Rikka Gakuen's juniors emerge victorious in the match against Yamanami, leading Minato to lament his perceived uselessness to the team. Eitarō begins contemplating whether he should quit the team, and he later reveals to Minato that he lied about having been Minato's friend in middle school. In truth, Eitarō always looked up to Minato but was too nervous to talk to him; and he thought that with Minato's memories gone, if he could convince Minato that the two were friends, he would finally have a chance at being friends with—and playing alongside—a gifted water polo player, so long as they no longer played at Shogakukan, where Eitarō reasoned he would never be taken off the bench since there were so many other talented players. Minato visits Akimitsu Bizen, coach of the Shogakukan team, to ask what it was that made him such a good player in middle school. Coach Bizen reveals that contrary to popular belief, what really made Minato exceptional was his perseverance and determination to get better, showcased by his habit of recording and rewatching his practices on DVDs, all of which are still in his room. Relieved at the prospect that sheer willpower and determination—not natural talent—was what made him good before, Minato reasons he can accomplish such a feat again. After revealing this to Eitarō, Minato convinces him not to quit the team.
6	"Hey! Look This Way!"; Transliteration: "Hai, Kotchi Muite" (Japanese: はい、こっち向いて)	Nao Miyoshi	Masafumi Nishida	Shigeyuki Miya	August 15, 2021
One month into the formation of their group, the Yamanami water polo team holds a lock-in training camp during which the members bond with each other. Amihama reveals that his parents are divorced, and Minato reveals that he is somewhat apprehensive about the possibility that getting back his old memories might cause him to forget the new memories that he's made. As the training camp continues, Ushimado begins to grow disheartened, feeling that he's dragging down the rest of the team due to his seeming lack of athletic ability. However, after seeing the way the rest of the team tries to find ways to encourage him, Ushimado resolves to try to improve, as well as not to be so hard on himself. As the camp ends, Jō reveals that Yamanami's team is slated to face off against both Rikka Gakuen and Shogakukan in July prefectural tournament. Two days later, Minato catches up with Chinu and thanks her for pushing him to continue pursuing water polo, declaring that he loves the sport. After Minato pedals off on his bicycle, Chinu smiles after him until, once he can no longer see her, she suddenly begins to scowl instead.
7	"Auspicious Day"; Transliteration: "Taian Kichijitsu" (Japanese: 大安吉日)	Mitsue Yamasaki	Masafumi Nishida	Mitsue Yamasaki	August 29, 2021 (Note: This episode aired at 2:05 a.m. JST, 35 minutes after the original air time on TV Asahi.)
After an exhausting practice, Jõ announces that Yamanami is getting official team tracksuits, a decision that disinterests Amihama, who says that he already has a tracksuit and has no desire to match with the other members of the team. Minato catches up with Amihama later, at which point the latter reveals that he's so adamant about using his own tracksuit because it was handed down to him by Riku. To Amihama, his tracksuit represents the possibility that he might one day beat Riku—and that Riku might finally view him as a rival and an equal again, a status Amihama lost when Riku was on Minato's team in middle school and began to view Minato as his rival instead. Later that day at practice, as the team is brainstorming slogans, Jõ tells the team that his father used to be the captain of Yamanami's water polo club and that he and his father used to be very close; but after the death of his mother, the two have grown distant due to lack of communication. Jō also tells the team that he restarted the water polo club because he hoped it would give him and his father something to talk about again. After hearing Jõ's motivation and learning that the idea behind matching tracksuits was to bring the team together, Amihama relents from his original position and agrees to wear the team tracksuit. When Minato returns home and reviews more DVDs of his middle-school practices, he happens across a recording of his being severely cruel to a teammate, leading him to question the kind of person he used to be.
8	"Who Are These Guys?"; Transliteration: "Dare Nanda yo, Koitsura" (Japanese: 誰なんだよ、こいつら)	Kōki Aoshima	Masafumi Nishida	Shigeyuki Miya	September 5, 2021
Afraid to ask Eitarō about a sudden memory of having made vituperative comments at his teammate, Minato instead seeks the truth from Chinu, who confirms his suspicions and reveals that he was an arrogant braggart. Chinu also reveals that Minato's bullying of teammate Hiroshi Ichinose, whom Chinu thought of as an older brother, led to the boy's transferring to a different school and quitting water polo entirely. Chinu informs Minato that she lied about the second part of bet that she and he made; she completely fabricated it because she didn't think that Minato deserved the option to quit water polo after having crushed someone else's spirit to play the sport. As Chinu angrily walks away, the rest of Minato's memories suddenly return. Riding his bike to return home, Minato gets lost and collapses, hitting his head against the pavement, which leads to his being hospitalized. The doctor reveals to his family that the trauma to Minato's head has caused him to again experience amnesia, this time losing all of his memories from the previous year while retaining his memories—and personality—from middle school. Minato seeks out Coach Bizen and asks to rejoin Shogakukan, but the coach informs Minato that re-enrolling him will be impossible due to the gap in physical development between Minato and Shogakukan's current members. An enraged Minato returns home after rebuffing his teammates from Yamanami, deriding them as beneath him, and ransacks his own room out of anger. As the episode ends, Minato breaks down crying.
9	"I've Always Been Me"; Transliteration: "Ore wa Zutto Ore Nanda yo" (Japanese: 俺はずっと俺なんだよ)	Sekino Sekiju	Masafumi Nishida	Sekino Sekiju	September 12, 2021
Eitarō tries to convince Minato to return to practicing with Yamanami's team, but Minato refuses and leaves the conversation convinced that the Yamanami team is beneath him. Minato visits Riku, who reveals that Coach Bizen often compares him to Minato and that he wants to defeat Minato at the prefectural tournament to prove that he is better than Minato. It is also implied that the reason Minato became so arrogant was because Coach Bizen instructed him that an ace "has to be selfish." Discontent with Riku's statement of determination to be victorious, Minato announces that he's quit water polo and leaves Riku grimacing with anger. After overhearing his family's discussion of his regaining his memories, Minato angrily screams at them before running to his room, where he discovers a video that he recorded for himself in case he regained his old memories but lost his new ones. In the video, Minato's previous self introduces him to the Yamanami water polo team and explains the meaningful friendship that he shares with them. Moved by the team's seriousness about winning, Minato decides not to quit. Though he is condescending toward the other members at the start of practice, they still support him when he discovers that his loss of muscle has stopped his body from moving with the same strength that he used to possess. Despite this display of camaraderie, however, Minato remains determined to prove that he alone can win against any team. After Chinu discovers that Minato has regained his middle-school memories and become much the same person he was back then, she says she wants nothing more to do with him.
10	"It's the Only Way I Know to Win"; Transliteration: "Ore wa Kono Kachikata Shika Shiranai" (Japanese: 俺はこの勝ち方しか知らない)	Kyōko Yamazaki	Masafumi Nishida	Shigeyuki Miya	September 19, 2021
11	"Pass! Pass to Me!"; Transliteration: "Dase! Ore ni Dase!" (Japanese: 出せ！ 俺に出せ！)	Yasutomo Okamoto	Masafumi Nishida	Masako Satō	September 26, 2021
12	"C'mon, Let's Get Started"; Transliteration: "Sā, Hajimeyō ze" (Japanese: さぁ、始めようぜ)	Kiyoshi Matsuda	Masafumi Nishida	Masako Satō	October 3, 2021

== Reception ==
Anime News Network had four editors review the first episode of the anime: Richard Eisenbeis commended the episode for covering Minato's rehabilitation and giving focus to his family after the accident, but criticized the use of memory loss that removed the years of "emotional, physical, and intellectual growth" he gained from elementary school and going through high school without the "emotional maturity and social skills" needed; James Beckett gave high praise to Masafumi Nishida and MAPPA for telling a "compelling and thoughtfully-written character drama" that doesn't use Minato's situation as a "source of cheap melodrama" and commended Yūto Uemura's performance for capturing Minato's "childish yet melancholy dichotomy" throughout the episode; Nicholas Dupree felt the episode suffered from tonal whiplash when telling its two different stories, praising the "surprisingly grounded personal drama" involving Minato and his family recovering post-accident but criticized the "loud, wacky sports story" that throws him into comedic shenanigans while retaining "mental and emotional stress" from said accident, saying the show failed to balance its two halves without showing its central sport. The fourth reviewer, Rebecca Silverman, felt the show has potential with its "different approach" to the "average sports anime", criticizing the classmates prodding Minato to get back into water polo but prasied the family for supporting his decision to leave the sport, saying, "That could give this show the structure it needs to work, so if you're missing the boys in speedo-equivalents from Fairy Ranmaru (or you know more about water polo than me), this is worth checking out."
