= Shun Miyazato =

Japanese actor and voice actor (born 1992)

- 宮里 駿
- Born: October 4, 1992 (age 33); Kagoshima Prefecture, Japan
- Occupations: Actor; voice actor

Shun Miyazato (宮里 駿, Miyazato Shun; born October 4, 1992) is a Japanese actor and voice actor who is affiliated with Himawari Theatre Group.

== Filmography ==
=== Films ===
Year	Film title	Role	Notes
2007	YOSHIMOTO DIRECTOR'S 100	Imai Tamotsu	
2012	Lesson of the Evil	Naoki Isada	Film adaptation of Yusuke Kishi's 2010 novel of the same name.

== Voice Roles ==
=== Television Anime ===
- Cyborg 009 The Cyborg Soldier (2001) – Mel (Episode 28)
- Kino's Journey (2003) – Threesome
- Aishiteruze Baby (2004) – Shōta Nashiya
- Capeta (2005) – Isamu Tobita (Elementary School)
- Michiko to Hatchin (2008) – Gonzales
- Yu-Gi-Oh! 5Ds (2008) – Marco
- Re-Main (2021) – Kōki Toguchi

=== Anime films ===
- Colorful (2010) – Classmate

=== Dubbing roles ===
==== Live-action ====
- Stand by Me – Teddy Duchamp (Corey Feldman) (2019 Blu-ray version)

==== Animation ====
- Guillermo del Toro's Pinocchio - Candlewick
- Wish - Dario
