= Blues Harp (film) =

- DVD cover
- Directed by: Takashi Miike
- Written by: Screenplay: Toshihiko Matsuo, Toshiyuki Morioka
- Produced by: Toshihiko Matsuo
- Cinematography: Hideo Yamamoto
- Edited by: Yasushi Shimamura
- Music by: Atsushi Okuno
- Release date: 1998
- Running time: 107 minutes
- Country: Japan
- Language: Japanese

Blues Harp is a 1998 Japanese yakuza film directed by Takashi Miike.

== Plot summary ==
Ambitious yakuza Kenji of the Hanamura gang befriends harmonica-playing bartender Chuji, who also works as a part-time drug-dealer for the opposing Okada gang. Kenji is sleeping with Reiko, the wife of the boss Yukichi Hanamura, and pays a man to forge a will naming Kenji as Yukichi's sole heir. He then makes a deal with Kojima of the Okada gang whereby Kojima will have Yukichi Hanamura killed and then Kenji will have Okada killed in retaliation, thereby allowing Kenji and Kojima to rise to the head of their respective gangs. Tokiko tells Chuji that she is pregnant with his child and a scout from City Records named Mr. Sugiyama offers to sign Chuji. Kenji's bodyguard Kaneko, jealous of Kenji's friendship with Chuji, suggests to the Okadas that they should send the expendable Chuji to kill Yukichi Hanamura and ultimately be shot by a waiting sniper. Reiko replaces Hanamura's will with the forgery and Kojima offers to let Chuji stop dealing drugs and become a professional musician if he kills Hanamura. Kaneko confesses to Kenji that he suggested Chuji to the Okadas so Kaneko rushes to the hotel where Hanamura meets his mistress and is accidentally almost shot by Chuji. Hanamura and his men kill Kojima and shoot at Kenji and Chuji as they are escaping back to the club for Chuji's stage performance for the record executives. Hanamura's men arrive and kill Kenji, then enter the club to get Chuji.

== Cast ==
- Mickey Curtis
- Daisuke Iijima as Yukichi Hanamura
- Hiroyuki Ikeuchi as Chuji Yonashiro
- Akira Ishige
- Huntley Nicholas as Chuji's black father
- Atsushi Okuno
- Saori Sekino as Tokiko
- Bob Suzuki
- Seiichi Tanabe as Kenji Shindo

== Other credits ==
- Production Design: Akira Ishige
- Assistant Director: Bunmei Katô
- Sound Department: Yukiya Sato - sound

== Reception ==
In his 2005 book Outlaw Masters of Japanese Film, author Chris Desjardins writes, "A truly great picture, Blues Harp remains one of Miike's finest, a perfectly realized and emotionally affecting movie."
