= Inu no Kubiwa to Koroke to =

- Directed by: Seiki Nagahara
- Starring: Kenta Kamakari; Chisun; Masaya Nakamura
- Release date: January 28, 2012 (Japan)
- Running time: 84 minutes
- Country: Japan
- Language: Japanese

Inu no Kubiwa to Koroke to (犬の首輪とコロッケと) is a 2012 Japanese drama film directed by Seiki Nagahara.

== Cast ==
- Kenta Kamakari
- Chisun
- Masaya Nakamura
