= Mameshiba Ichirō 3D =

- Directed by: Tōru Kamei
- Starring: Jirō Satō; Asami Usuda; Naozumi Takahashi
- Release date: 4 February 2012 (Japan)
- Running time: 58 minutes
- Country: Japan
- Language: Japanese

Mameshiba Ichirō 3D (マメシバ一郎 ３Ｄ) is a 2012 Japanese 3D film directed by Tōru Kamei.

== Cast ==
- Jirō Satō
- Asami Usuda
- Naozumi Takahashi
