= Mickey Curtis =

Japanese actor, singer and media personality (born 1938)

- ミッキー・カーチス
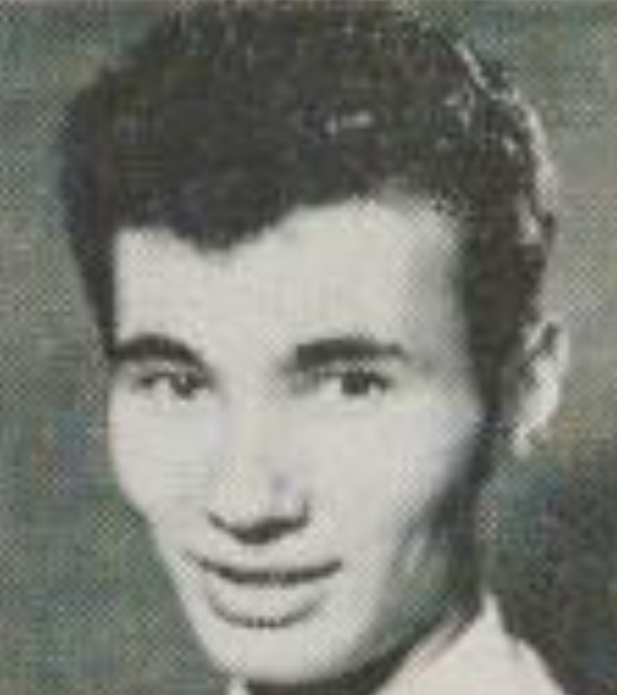
- Curtis in 1962
- Born: Michael Brian Curtis; 23 July 1938 (age 88); Minato-ku, Tokyo, Japan
- Other names: Igarashi Shinjirô; Mikkī Kāchisu
- Occupations: Actor, singer
- Years active: 1958–present
- Spouse: Mari Yoshimura (1962–1964)
- Musical career
- Genres: Rock and roll; Progressive rock; Rockabilly
- Instrument: Vocals
- Labels: Victor, Philips, Black

Mickey Curtis (ミッキー・カーチス, Mikkī Kāchisu; born Michael Brian Curtis (マイケル・ブライアン・カーティス, Maikeru Buraian Kātisu), later 加千須 ブライアン (Kāchisu Buraian), real name after naturalization in Japan, 23 July 1938) is a Japanese actor, singer and media personality. He was born to English-Japanese parents.

A pivotal figure in Japanese popular music, Curtis is considered one of the three big Japanese names in rock music, helping to popularize the genre in the 1950s where he began as a rockabilly singer. In 1967, he became internationally known for his psychedelic rock band "Mickey Curtis & The Samurai". After five years, Curtis disbanded the group and returned to Japan in 1972, where he began producing other musicians.

As an actor his first role was as a rock singer in the 1958 film All About Marriage by Kihachi Okamoto and he has since gone on to star in more than 70 feature films. Apart from his entertainment career he has also been a race car driver and owns a motorcycle shop in Meguro, Tokyo. He speaks Japanese, English, French, German, Italian and Thai.

== Selected filmography ==
=== Film ===
Year	Film	Role	Notes	Ref.
1959	Fires on the Plain	Nagamatsu		
1962	The Big Wave	Yukio		
1963	Brave Records of the Sanada Clan	Yuri Kamanosuke		
1986	Jikuu Senshi Spielban	Emperor Guillotine		
1989	Gunhed	Bansho		
1992	8 Man	Sniper		
1995	Kamikaze Taxi	Animaru		
1996	Swallowtail Butterfly	Doctor		
1996	Fudoh: The New Generation	Yasha Gang Assassin		
1998	Blues Harp			
1998	Hana no O-Edo no Tsuribaka Nisshi			
2001	Cowboy Bebop: The Movie	Rasheed (voice)		
2001	Lily Festival			
2001	Warm Water Under a Red Bridge	Nobuyuki Ohnishi		
2002	Agitator	Yokomizo		
2002	The Laughing Frog	Kiichiro Aisawa		
2002	Aiki	Miyaji		
2003	Kikoku			
2004	Izo			
2004	Blooming Again	Jun'ichi Kuroi		
2005	Custom Made 10.30	A god		
2008	SS	Nishiyama President		
2008	Kurosagi			
2008	Cafe Isobe	Hongo		
2011	Deadball			
2012	Robo-G	Shigemitsu Suzuki	Lead role	
2016	Drowning Love	Tetsuo		
2019	Until I Meet September's Love	Gondō		
2021	Every Trick in the Book			

=== Television ===
Year	Title	Role
1964–1965	Stingray	Lieutenant Phones (Japanese Dub)
1986–1987	Jikuu Senshi Spielban	Emperor Guillotine
2014	Gunshi Kanbei	Matsunaga Hisahide
2017	Quartet	Nemoto
2017	Yasuragi no Sato	Rokurō
