= Robo-G =

- Theatrical release poster
- Directed by: Shinobu Yaguchi
- Written by: Shinobu Yaguchi
- Produced by: Yoshino Sasaki; Naoto Inaba; Shintaro Horikawa; Takao Tsuchimoto
- Starring: Mickey Curtis; Yuriko Yoshitaka; Gaku Hamada
- Cinematography: Katsumi Yanagishima
- Edited by: Ryūji Miyajima
- Music by: Mickie Yoshino
- Production companies: Fuji Television; Altamira Pictures
- Distributed by: Toho
- Release date: 14 January 2012 (Japan)
- Running time: 111 minutes
- Country: Japan
- Language: Japanese
- Box office: ¥1.16 billion (Japan)

Robo-G (Japanese: ロボジー, Hepburn: Robo Ji) is a 2012 Japanese comedy film directed by Shinobu Yaguchi and starring Mickey Curtis and Yuriko Yoshitaka. Curtis, who goes by the stage name Igarashi Shinjirō in this film, plays the role of a 73-year-old man, while Yoshitaka stars as a robots-obsessed college student.

Robo-G was released in Japanese cinemas on 14 January 2012.

The song in the final credits is a cover of Mr. Roboto, originally by the band Styx.

== Plot ==
Kobayashi, Nagai, and Ota, three employees of the Robot Development Division at Kimura Electric Company, are ordered by their president to develop a bipedal robot named "New Shiokaze" in just three months to promote the company. One week before the Robot Expo, where they are to present the robot, a malfunction occurs and the robot they have worked so hard to develop goes out of control, falling from a window to the ground. The computer and hardware are destroyed along with the robot's skeleton.

Fearing they will be fired, the three come up with a plan to get through the Robot Expo by putting a human inside the remaining exterior of New Shiokaze. They hold a fake audition to gather actors for a costumed show, and after many twists and turns, the person they choose is Suzuki Shigemitsu, an elderly man living in retirement. Believing it to be a costumed show, Suzuki dons the exterior of New Shiokaze and takes part in the Robot Expo. At the venue, New Shiokaze (Suzuki) instantly saves a female robot-geek college student named Sasaki Yoko who is nearly crushed by a falling pillar, and New Shiokaze becomes a hero all over Japan overnight. With requests to perform coming in from all over Japan, the three can't back out, so they tell Suzuki the truth and ask him to continue playing the role of New Shiokaze.

Suzuki gets furious and sends the three away. Kobayashi regrets his actions, Ota gives up thinking, and Nagai is driven to the point of attempting to commit suicide by disguising it as a car fall accident (but is stopped by a motorcycle policeman that happens to pass by), so Suzuki sympathizes with the three and accepts their request. However, in return, Suzuki demands exceptional treatment, such as accommodation in the highest-class hotel and luxurious meals at their business trip destinations. Since Suzuki has a hold on their weakness, the three cannot speak up to Suzuki, and they cannot request expenses from the company, so they fall in a tight financial situation. Just then, New Shiokaze (Suzuki) leaves the event venue to visit his daughter and grandchildren without permission, and the three think that he has disappeared, but cannot report the incident to the police, and get exhausted. Later, when Suzuki returns, Ota scolds him, and Suzuki calms down. Although Ota grumbles, he has become fond of Suzuki, and sticks powerful neodymium magnets on the lower back of Suzuki who has lumbago.

Yoko, who has become such a big fan of New Shiokaze that she follows him around, asks the three to give a lecture at her university robotics research club, but on the day, the three are overwhelmed by the advanced knowledge of the students in the science and engineering department, and begins to seriously research robots. At first, the three accepted the lecture request just for the sake of money, but they are so impressed by the students' sincere research attitude that they begin to seriously build robots and redevelop the real robot New Shiokaze.

Yoko, whose graduation thesis topic is "New Shiokaze," visits Kimura Electric Company to look for a job, but Ota, fearing that the new member joining the robot development department will reveal the secret of New Shiokaze, cruelly tells Yoko, "You are not suited for robots at all," and "We are not be able to go to the university for lectures anymore." In the midst of her grief, Yoko becomes enraged when she finds evidence that there is a person inside New Shiokaze, and begins to cooperate with Itami of a local cable TV station in exposing the secret of Kimura Electric.

Around the same time, a researcher overseas points out that "New Shiokaze is fake," and the president of Kimura Electric sets up a press conference to clear the suspicion. Meanwhile, Itami approaches Suzuki, presents him with evidence that there is a person inside New Shiokaze, and asks him to "reveal his identity at the press conference."

Finally, the day of the press conference arrives. Yoko receives an envelope that Kobayashi had entrusted to a male student of the robot research club. Inside is the blueprint of New Shiokaze, which Kobayashi and the other two had worked hard to develop. Yoko, convinced that the three are seriously working on the robot's development, rushes to the press conference venue of Kimura Electric's Robot Development Division to prevent Itami's accusation.

When Yoko arrives at the venue, she sees Itami trying forcibly to open the head of New Shiokaze to photograph the inside, and New Shiokaze (Suzuki) running away from Itami. Eventually, as many reporters look on, New Shiokaze falls from the window of the venue to the ground and is destroyed. However, what actually fell was a dummy made of a costume that Suzuki had obtained from a cos-player he met at the event venue, and Suzuki himself throws the dummy out of the refrigerator at the right time, hides inside instead, and quietly leaves Kimura Electric while everyone at the venue rushes to the ground.

All that remains with Suzuki is a photo of New Shiokaze taken with his grandchildren and four magnets to attach to his waist.

A year and a half later, with Yoko joining the team, the Robot Development Department now has four members and develops New Shiokaze 2, but just before the robot is to be unveiled at the International Robot Conference, an accident occurs during a test run, and the robot falls out of a window and is damaged. At their wit's end, the four of them visit Suzuki, who is still living in retirement as before, and ask for his help. Suzuki smiles, sensing the start of something new.

== Cast ==
- Mickey Curtis as Shigemitsu Suzuki, a 73-year-old man.
- Yuriko Yoshitaka as Yoko Sasaki, a college student who is obsessed with robots.
- Gaku Hamada as Hiroki Kobayashi, one of the robot developers at Kimura Electronics.
- Junya Kawashima as Shinya Nagai, one of the robot developers at Kimura Electronics.
- Shogo Kawai as Koji Ota, one of the robot developers at Kimura Electronics.
- Tomoko Tabata as Yayoi Itami
- Takehiko Ono as Sōsuke Kimura
- Emi Wakui as Saito Harue

== Reception ==
The film grossed ¥1.16 billion in Japan.
