= Lesson of the Evil =

2012 Japanese horror film

Aku no Kyōten
- Film poster
- Directed by: Takashi Miike
- Written by: Takashi Miike
- Based on: Aku no Kyōten by Yusuke Kishi
- Produced by: Kôji Higashi; Tōru Mori; Misako Saka
- Starring: Hideaki Itō; Takayuki Yamada; Mitsuru Fukikoshi
- Cinematography: Nobuyasu Kita
- Edited by: Kenji Yamashita
- Music by: Koji Endo
- Production company: Toho
- Release dates: November 9, 2012 (Rome Film Festival); November 10, 2012 (Japan)
- Running time: 128 minutes
- Country: Japan
- Language: Japanese
- Box office: $25.9 million

Aku no Kyōten (Japanese: 悪の教典; lit. 'Lesson of Evil'), also known in English as Lesson of the Evil or Lesson of Evil, is a 2012 Japanese thriller film directed by Takashi Miike starring Hideaki Itō. It is an adaptation of Yusuke Kishi's 2010 novel of the same name. A seinen manga under the same name, illustrated by Eiji Karasuyama, was also released in 2012 by Kodansha in Good! Afternoon magazine. The story contains many references to German culture, such as mention of Goethe's The Sorrows of Young Werther and a vinyl record playing "Mack the Knife" by Bertolt Brecht.

== Plot ==
High school English teacher Seiji Hasumi is secretly a sociopath. He has killed both his parents and his former tutor at the age of 14. While living in the United States, Hasumi meets Clay, another sociopath. The two commit numerous murders together. Hasumi eventually kills Clay, stating that while the latter enjoys killing for fun, the former does not.

Back in Japan, Hasumi collects all of the students' phones prior to an exam and secretly uses a phone jammer to prevent cheating. Meanwhile, a father who had complained about the bullying of his daughter Rina dies when someone replaces the bottles of water around his house with kerosene; it explodes when he tries to smoke a cigarette.

Tsurii, the adviser of the Radio Club, soon meets with Keisuke, the ringleader of a group of cheating students. Tsurii has dug into Hasumi's past and discovered that four students died of apparent suicides at his previous school. Hasumi, having bugged the room, later kills Tsurii, making his death appear as a suicide. Hasumi later knocks Keisuke out and ties him up. After being tortured by Hasumi, Keisuke admits that he and his friends were cheating. After checking that Keisuke did not tell others of Tsurii's suspicions, Hasumi kills him and hides his body.

Hasumi later learns that physical education teacher Shibahara is blackmailing a student, Miya, into giving him sexual favors. After he helps her eliminate Shibahara's leverage, Hasumi and Miya become lovers. Hasumi also discovers art teacher Kume's sexual relationship with a student; he blackmails Kume into lending him his luxury apartment. Hasumi then takes Miya there, and the two have sex. Hasumi presses Miya into giving him access to an online private discussion board that the students use, anonymously making claims about the murder of Rina's father, accusing delinquent student Tadenuma. Hasumi invites Tadenuma out for a drink and kills him; the students later assume that Tadenuma ran away from home.

Students later stay overnight in the school, preparing a haunted house for the school cultural festival. When Miya grows suspicious of Tadenuma's disappearance, Hasumi throws her off a roof and forges a suicide note with her signature. However, another student soon appears and finds the note; Hasumi kills her, too. As Hasumi has no method of masking this last murder, he decides to massacre his students. Hasumi tricks most of the students by using the intercom to order them to proceed to the roof, which he has already locked. Some students hide inside the art room, closing it off with fire shutters and barricading the entry points.

Student Kakeru escapes the school and finds a man who calls the police. He later returns to the school to rescue student Satomi, who tries to escape by roping out of the art room window, slips and breaks her ankles. Hasumi is alerted to their presence and proceeds to shoot them dead from a window with a shotgun. Using Satomi's rope, Hasumi climbs into the art room and slays every student inside.

After the massacre, Hasumi tries to cover up his actions by making it seem like Kume handcuffed him, killed everyone and committed suicide afterward. However, Hasumi's plans are foiled when one of two surviving students who faked their deaths points out to police that the school's training defibrillator records audio. The defibrillator ends up containing evidence of one of the victims speaking Hasumi's name before being slain. Hasumi is arrested, but plans to use his recently learned knowledge of Norse mythology as his legal defense by suggesting his acts are "the will of God." It is then revealed that Miya also survived Hasumi's attack.

== Cast ==
- Hideaki Itō as Seiji Hasumi
- Takayuki Yamada as Tetsuro Shibahara
- Mitsuru Fukikoshi as Masanobu Tsurii
- Takehiro Hira as Takeki Kume
- Shōta Sometani as Keisuke Hayami
- Shun Miyazato as Naoki Isada
- Fumi Nikaidō as Reika Katagiri
- Elina Mizuno as Miya Yasuhara
- Kento Hayashi as Masahiko Maejima
- Kenta as Masahiro Tadenuma
- Kodai Asaka as Yuichiro Nagoshi
- Jodi Lynn Smith as Suzanna Carter

== Release ==
The film premiered at the Rome Film Festival on November 9, 2012. It was selected to screen at the Stanley Film Festival in April 2014. It was released in Toho-affiliated theaters on November 10, 2012.

It was released on 309 screens nationwide, including TOHO Cinemas Nichigeki. Over its opening two days—November 10 and 11, 2012—it grossed ¥298,945,000 and drew an audience of 215,059, debuting at number two in the box office rankings (compiled by Kogyo Tsushinsha). The text that reads "TO BE CONTINUED" at the end of the film reflects the desire of director Takashi Miike—expressed in both the original source material and the film's program—to create a sequel; the original author, Yusuke Kishi, has also stated in the program that he wishes to write a continuation.

== Reception ==
Jay Weissberg of Variety gave the movie a negative review, calling it "nothing more than a slick slasher pic" and pointing out its debatable taste: "Even were the memory of the Breivik massacre, among others, not so fresh, there's something deeply unseemly about turning a high-school bloodbath into an adrenaline-pumping pleasure ride."

Jessica Kiang of The Playlist panned the film, calling it "overlong and incoherent" and "sadly more bore than gore". She did not see see any deeper meaning in the film, saying: "It's just too silly to lay a claim to any philosophy, even nihilism."

Jonathan Barkan of the horror website Bloody Disgusting calls the movie "thoroughly entertaining and exciting", but criticizes that it overstays its welcome and would "benefit from a slightly tighter final cut." Takayuki Yamada won Best Supporting Actor at the 34th Yokohama Film Festival for his performances in this film, The Samurai That Night, and The Floating Castle.

Lesson of the Evil earned $25.9 million at the Japanese box office.
