= Shinobido (film) =

- Directed by: Toshiyuki Morioka
- Starring: Aimi Satsukawa; Ayaka Kikuchi; Shōgen; Satoshi Kurihara
- Distributed by: EDO Wonderland
- Release date: February 4, 2012 (Japan)
- Running time: 93 minutes
- Country: Japan
- Language: Japanese

Shinobido (忍道－SHINOBIDO－) is a 2012 Japanese jidaigeki film directed by Toshiyuki Morioka.

== Cast ==
- Aimi Satsukawa
- Ayaka Kikuchi
- Shōgen
- Satoshi Kurihara
