= Masahiro Higashide =

Japanese actor and model (born 1988)

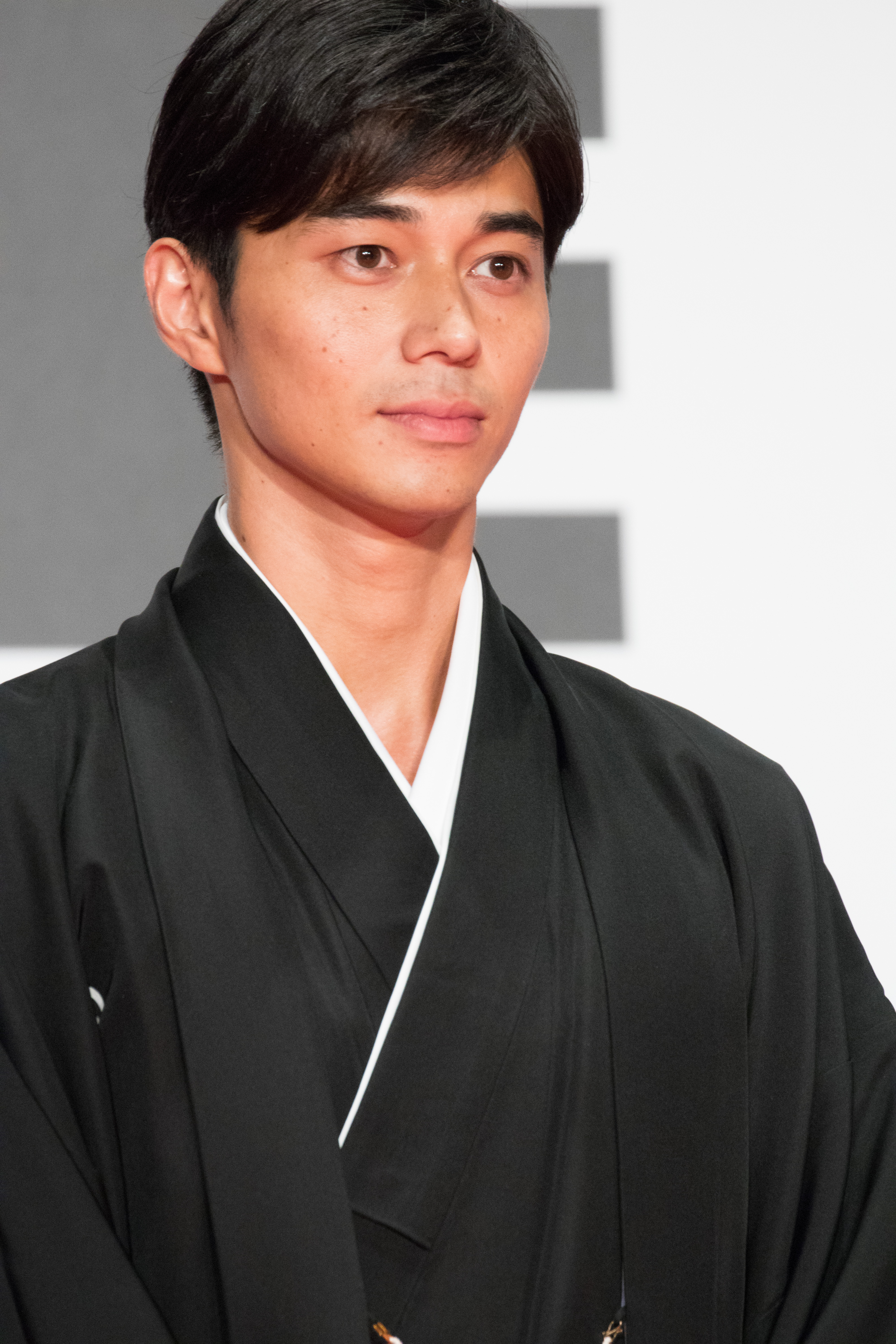
- Higashide at the Tokyo International Film Festival in 2016
- Born: February 1, 1988 (age 38); Saitama, Japan
- Occupations: Actor; model
- Years active: 2004–present
- Height: 1.89 m (6 ft 2 1/2 in)
- Spouses: Anne Watanabe (m. 2015; div. 2020); Karin Matsumoto (m. 2024)
- Children: 4

YouTube information
- Channel: 東出昌大
- Years active: 2024–present
- Genre: Vlog
- Subscribers: 559 thousand
- Views: 105 million

Japanese name
- Kanji: 東出 昌大
- Hiragana: ひがしで まさひろ
Transcriptions
- Romanization: Higashide Masahiro
- Last updated: February 15, 2025
- Website: masahirohigashide.com

Masahiro Higashide (東出 昌大, Higashide Masahiro; born February 1, 1988) is a Japanese actor and model. In 2012, he debuted as an actor in The Kirishima Thing.

== Early life ==
Higashide was born on February 1, 1988, in Saitama Prefecture. He has one older brother. He graduated from Saitama Prefectural Asaka High School. Higashide practiced kendo daily when he was young because his father was a kendo teacher and was also a chef specializing in Japanese cuisine. His father died when he was nineteen due to an illness.

== Career ==
He debuted as a model in the 19th Men's Non-no Exclusive Model Audition in high school. After graduating from high school, he aimed to become a jewelry designer and proceeded to attend a jewelry school. He was active as a model for ZUCCa or Yohji Yamamoto from 2006 to 2011.

He debuted in The Kirishima Thing in 2012 and has been an actor since then.

He has acted on the NHK TV program “Rakugo Deeper!"

== Personal life ==
Higashide married fellow actor Anne Watanabe on January 1, 2015. The couple share three children; twin daughters born in May 2016 and a son born in November 2017.

In January 2020, Shūkan Bunshun revealed that Higashide had been having an extramarital affair with actress Erika Karata since 2017, when Watanabe was pregnant with their third child. The report was later confirmed by his agency. The incident caused Higashide to lose several endorsement deals. On August 1, 2020, Watanabe finalized her divorce with Higashide, promising that they will work together to take care of the children.

On August 27, 2024, Higashide announced his second marriage on his official YouTube channel to a non-celebrity woman, who is eleven years his junior, upon learning of her pregnancy. The two had reportedly begun a relationship in mid-2024. It was later revealed to be former actress Karin Matsumoto, and that the two had met before on set prior to her retirement from the entertainment industry. His wife gave birth to her first and Higashide's fourth child on February 3, 2025.

== Filmography ==
=== Film ===
Year	Title	Role	Notes	Ref(s)
2012	The Kirishima Thing	Hiroki Kikuchi		
2013	It All Began When I Met You	Takumi Tsumura	Story 2: "Long Distance Relationship"	
2014	Crows Explode	Kazeo Kaburagi	Lead role	
2014	Blue Spring Ride	Kō Mabuchi	Lead role	
2014	0.5mm	karaoke clerk		
2014	Parasyte: Part 1	Hideo Shimada		
2015	Parasyte: Part 2	Hideo Shimada		
2015	Gonin Saga	Hayato Hisamatsu	Lead role	
2016	Creepy	Nogami		
2016	Maniac Hero	Hidetoshi Nakatsu	Lead role	
2016	Death Note: Light Up the New World	Tsukuru Mishima	Lead role	
2016	Satoshi: A Move for Tomorrow	Yoshiharu Habu		
2016	My Tomorrow, Your Yesterday	Shōichi Ueyama		
2017	Sekigahara	Kobayakawa Hideaki		
2017	Before We Vanish	Pastor		
2017	Foreboding	Shirō Makabe	Lead role	
2018	Asako I & II	Baku and Ryōhei	Lead role	
2018	The Chrysanthemum and the Guillotine	Tetsu Nakahama	Lead role	
2018	Over Drive	Atsuhiro Hiyama	Lead role	
2018	Punk Samurai Slash Down	Kuroae Naohito		
2018	The Antique	Yoshio Tanaka		
2019	The Confidence Man JP: The Movie	Boku-chan		
2020	The Confidence Man JP: Episode of the Princess	Boku-chan		
2020	Mishima: The Last Debate	Narrator	Documentary	
2020	Ora, Ora Be Goin' Alone	Shūzō		
2020	Wife of a Spy	Taiji Tsumori		
2021	Blue	Kazuki Ogawa		
2021	The Sound of Grass	Kazuo Kudō	Lead role	
2021	We Couldn't Become Adults	Kenta Sekiguchi		
2022	The Pass: Last Days of the Samurai	Tokugawa Yoshinobu		
2022	The Confidence Man JP: Episode of the Hero	Boku-chan		
2022	The Flower in the Sky	Tatsuji Miyoshi	Lead role	
2023	Trapped Balloon	Kenji	Lead role	
2023	September 1923	Tanaka		
2023	Winny	Isamu Kaneko	Lead role	
2023	Corpo a Corpo	Hiro Nakajo		
2024	Dare to Stop Us 2	Junji Kimata		
2024	Will	Himself	Documentary	
2025	Demon City	Kanta Fuse		
2025	Dogs and War in Ukraine	Narrator	Documentary	
2025	Transcending Dimensions	Yasu		
2026	Titanic Ocean			
2026	Ame no Etranger	Muraki		

=== Television ===
Year	Title	Role	Notes	Ref(s)
2012	Renai Kentei	Junya Yoshimitsu		
2012	Reset: Honto no Shiawase no Mitsukekata	Shion/Jun Aya		
2012	Wonderful Single Life	Hiroki Yamada		
2013	xxxHolic	Shizuka Dōmeki		
2013	Amachan	Daikichi Ōmukai (young)		
2013–14	Bon Appetit!	Yūtarō Nishikado		
2014	Fathers	Yūsuke Togawa	Episode 7	
2015	Burning Flower	Kusaka Genzui		
2015	A Restaurant With Many Problems	Makoto Monji		
2016	Death Note: New Generation	Tsukuru Mishima		
2016–18	Moribito: Guardian of the Spirit	Tanda		
2017	Leaders 2	Makoto Kusakabe		
2017	I Love You Just a Little Bit	Ryōta Watanabe		
2018	The Confidence Man JP	Boku-chan		
2019	Villain	Shuichi Saeki		
2019	Pure!: The Case Files of an Idol Chief of Police for a Day	Shusaku Toudou		
2020	Keiji and Kenji: 24 Hours at the Local Police and the District Prosecutor's Office	Shuhei Majima		
2020	Wife of a Spy	Yasuharu Tsumori		
2025	Last Samurai Standing	Tsuge Kyōjin		
2025	People Are Scary	Umeyoshi		

=== Stage performances ===
- Nocturnes (2015)
- The Sea of Fertility (2018, 2018 PARCO PRODUCE)
- The Second Summer (2019, M&Oplays Produce)

=== Dubbing ===
- Legend of the Demon Cat (2018), Bai Long (Liu Haoran)

== Awards and nominations ==
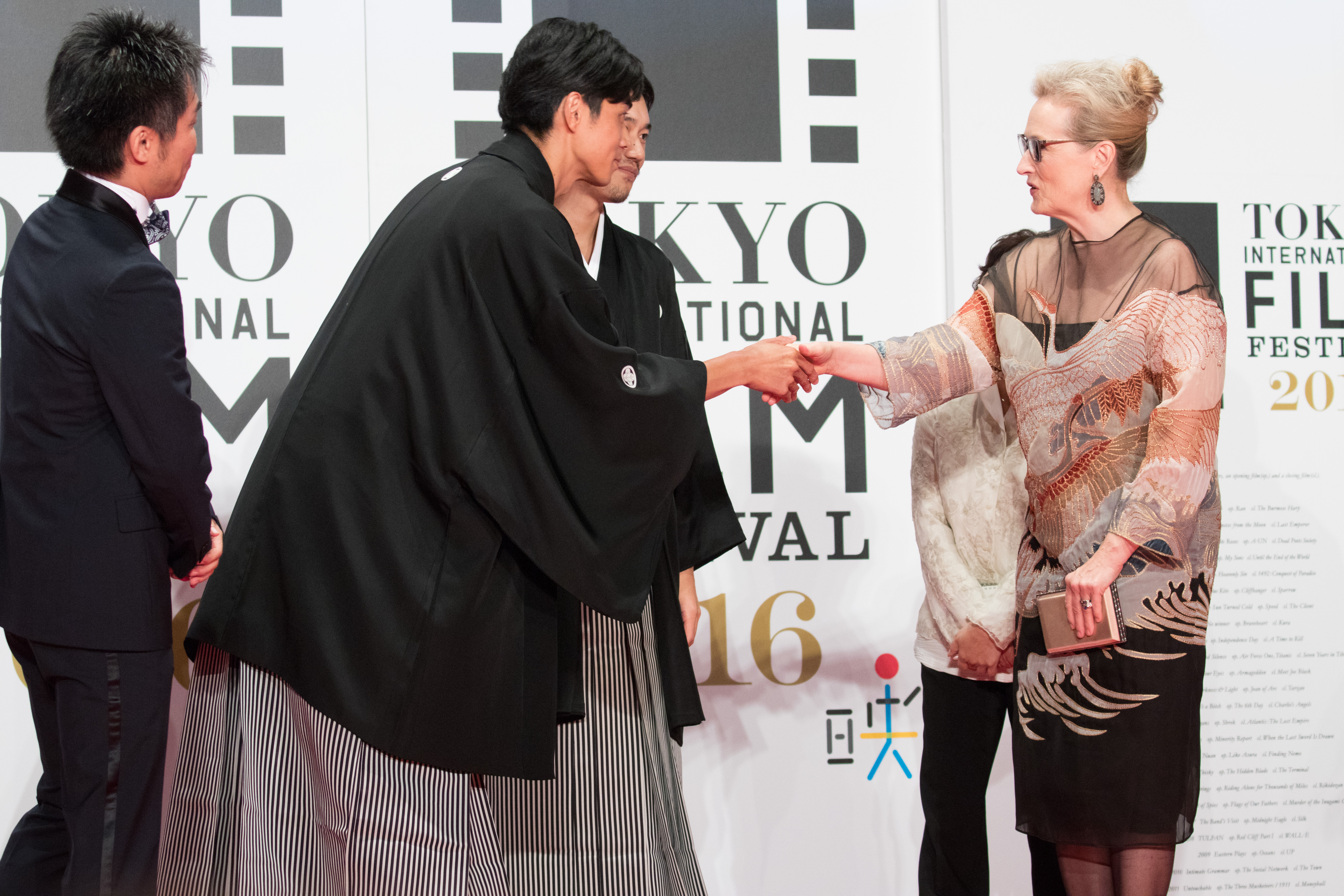
Higashide greeting Meryl Streep at the Opening Ceremony of the Tokyo International Film Festival 2016.

Year	Award	Category	Work(s)	Result	Ref(s)
2013	67th Mainichi Film Awards	Best New Actor	The Kirishima Thing	Won	
2013	36th Japan Academy Film Prize	Newcomers of the Year	The Kirishima Thing	Won	
2014	27th Nikkan Sports Film Awards	Yūjirō Ishihara Newcomer Award	Parasyte: Part 1 and Crows Explode	Won	
2014	38th Elan d'or Awards	Newcomers of the Year	Himself	Won	
2015	88th Kinema Junpo Awards	Best New Actor	Himself	Won	
2017	71st Mainichi Film Awards	Best Supporting Actor	Satoshi: A Move for Tomorrow	Nominated	
2017	12th Osaka Cinema Festival	Best Supporting Actor	Satoshi: A Move for Tomorrow	Won	
2017	40th Japan Academy Film Prize	Best Supporting Actor	Satoshi: A Move for Tomorrow	Nominated	
2017	26th Japanese Movie Critics Awards	Best Supporting Actor	Satoshi: A Move for Tomorrow	Won	
2018	31st Nikkan Sports Film Awards	Best Actor	Asako I & II and Over Drive	Nominated	
2019	61st Blue Ribbon Awards	Best Actor	Asako I & II and Over Drive	Nominated	
2019	40th Yokohama Film Festival	Best Actor	Asako I & II	Won	
2019	73rd Mainichi Film Awards	Best Actor	Asako I & II	Nominated	
2019	28th Tokyo Sports Film Awards	Best Actor	Asako I & II	Nominated	
2021	75th Mainichi Film Awards	Best Supporting Actor	Wife of a Spy	Nominated	
2021	63rd Blue Ribbon Awards	Best Supporting Actor	Wife of a Spy and The Confidence Man JP: Episode of the Princess	Nominated	
2022	76th Mainichi Film Awards	Best Actor	The Sound of Grass	Nominated	
2023	36th Nikkan Sports Film Awards	Best Actor	Winny and others	Nominated	
2024	66th Blue Ribbon Awards	Best Actor	Winny and others	Nominated	

== Books ==
=== Magazines ===
- Men's Non-no
- FINEBOYS
- GET ON!
- smart
- Smart HEAD
- Soen
