= Naoki Segi =

Japanese film director (born 1963)

Segi Naoki (瀬木直貴; born 1963 in Mie Prefecture) is a Japanese film director.

== Filmography ==
- Saka no ue no Maria (坂の上のマリア, lit. "Maria on the hill") (2001)
- Izure no Mori ka Aoki Umi (いずれの森か青き海) (2003)
- Sennenbi (2004)
