= Batsu Game 2 =

Japanese horror film

- Directed by: Masafumi Yamada
- Starring: Aika Ōta; Natsumi Hirajima; Ryoichi Yuki
- Release date: April 21, 2012
- Running time: 99 minutes
- Country: Japan
- Language: Japanese

Batsu Game 2 (×ゲーム2) is a 2012 Japanese suspense horror film directed by Masafumi Yamada. It was released on April 21, 2012.

== Cast ==
- Aika Ōta as Saeki
- Natsumi Hirajima as Hagiwara
- Ryoichi Yuki
