= The Kirishima Thing =

- Theatrical release poster
- Directed by: Daihachi Yoshida
- Written by: Kohei Kiyasu; Daihachi Yoshida
- Based on: Kirishima, Bukatsu Yamerutte yo by Ryo Asai
- Starring: Ryunosuke Kamiki; Ai Hashimoto; Masahiro Higashide; Suzuka Ogo
- Cinematography: Ryuto Kondo
- Edited by: Mototaka Kusakabe
- Music by: Tatsuro Kondo
- Distributed by: Showgate
- Release date: August 11, 2012 (Japan)
- Running time: 102 minutes
- Country: Japan
- Language: Japanese

The Kirishima Thing (Japanese: 桐島、部活やめるってよ, Hepburn: Kirishima, Bukatsu Yamerutte yo) is a 2012 Japanese high school drama film directed by Daihachi Yoshida and based on a novel by Ryo Asai. It was released on August 11, 2012. The film won several awards, including the Japan Academy Prize for Picture of the Year, and also received several nominations.

== Plot ==
Kirishima is a popular second-year high school student. He is captain of the volleyball team, does well academically, and is dating one of the most popular girls in the school. One day he suddenly stops showing up to school, and rumors begin circulating that he's quitting the volleyball club.

The same day, the school's film club is mocked during morning assembly for the title of a romantic film they were forced to make by their teacher. Against their teacher's wishes, they decide to begin filming a zombie movie. While filming, they run into Sawajima, the captain of the brass band club. Sawajima has a crush on Hiroki, Kirishima's best friend and popular girl Sana's boyfriend. Sawajima is trying to impress Hiroki by nonchalantly playing saxophone within view of him, but she is unsuccessful at impressing the boys and instead ends up disrupting the film club's filming.

In Kirishima's absence the smaller Koizumi is made the volleyball team's libero. During the weekend, Kirishima continues to remain unreachable. The volleyball team loses a match against another school, which upsets the larger and quick-tempered Kubo, who blames Koizumi and the absent Kirishima.

Outside of school, film club head Maeda runs into badminton club member Kasumi, who unlike the other girls treats him with respect and shows interest in the zombie film. Maeda develops feelings for Kasumi, though he later discovers that she is secretly dating Kirishima's friend Ryuta. Other badminton club member Mika shows sympathy for Koizumi over Kubo's harsh treatment.

A rift develops in Kirishima's girlfriend Risa's social circle. As Sana finds amusement in the volleyball club's conflicts, angering Mika. While in turn Mika takes glee in Risa's inability to contact Kirishima, angering Risa and Sana.

Sawajima overhears Sana and Hiroki planning to meet after school, and goes to their meetup spot before them in order to play saxophone, again unintentionally disrupting the film club. The film club agree to leave to instead go film on the school's roof. As Sana arrives and sees Sawajima waiting, she kisses Hiroki out of jealousy, causing Sawajima to run off.

In the school gym, Kubo's anger with Koizumi boils over, but just before he begins beating Koizumi up, Tomohiro runs in and says Kirishima is on the roof of the school. Kirishima's friends, the volleyball club boys, badminton club girls, and Risa and Sana all run to the school's roof, but they find only the film club with no sign of Kirishima. Kubo takes his anger out on the film club, leading to a brawl in which everybody's emotions and frustrations come out.

After the brawl, Hiroki returns the camera lens cap to Maeda and talks with him about his camera, only to begins to cry when Maeda points his camera at him. As he leaves the school, Hiroki once again attempts to call Kirishima.

== Cast ==
No club (boys)

- Masahiro Higashide as Hiroki Kikuchi
- Motoki Ochiai as Ryuta
- Kodai Asaka as Tomohiro

No club (girls)

- Mayu Matsuoka as Sana
- Mizuki Yamamoto as Risa

Film club

- Ryunosuke Kamiki as Ryoya Maeda
- Tomoya Maeno as Takefumi

Volleyball club

- Taiga Nakano as Fusuke Koizumi
- Nobuyuki Suzuki as Kubo

Badminton club

- Ai Hashimoto as Kasumi
- Kurumi Shimizu as Mika Miyabe

Brass band club

- Suzuka Ogo as Aya Sawajima
- Takemi Fujii as Shiori

Supporting cast

- Shuhei Takahashi
- Hideto Iwai as Katayama
- Tomofumi Okumura
- Enomoto Isao as Hino

== Production ==
Principal photography took place in Kōchi.

== Reception ==
=== Critical response ===
On Film Business Asia, Derek Elley gave the film a grade of 8 out of 10, calling it "an offbeat gem".

=== Accolades ===
Award	Date	Category	Recipients and nominees	Result
Asian Film Awards	March 18, 2013	Best Newcomer	Masahiro Higashide	Nominated
Asian Film Awards	March 18, 2013	Best Screenwriter	Kohei Kiyasu and Daihachi Yoshida	Nominated
Asian Film Awards	March 18, 2013	Best Editor	Mototaka Kusakabe	Won
Japan Academy Film Prize	March 8, 2013	Picture of the Year	The Kirishima Thing	Won
Japan Academy Film Prize	March 8, 2013	Director of the Year	Daihachi Yoshida	Won
Japan Academy Film Prize	March 8, 2013	Best Editor	Mototaka Kusakabe	Won
Japan Academy Film Prize	March 8, 2013	Screenplay of the Year	Kohei Kiyasu	Nominated
Japan Academy Film Prize	March 8, 2013	Screenplay of the Year	Daihachi Yoshida	Nominated
Japan Academy Film Prize	March 8, 2013	Best Newcomers	Masahiro Higashide	Won
Japan Academy Film Prize	March 8, 2013	Best Newcomers	Ai Hashimoto	Won
Hochi Film Award	December 18, 2012	Best Director	Daihachi Yoshida	Won
Hochi Film Award	December 18, 2012	Best Actor	Ryunosuke Kamiki	Nominated
