= Masato Harada =

Japanese filmmaker (1949–2025)

- 原田 眞人
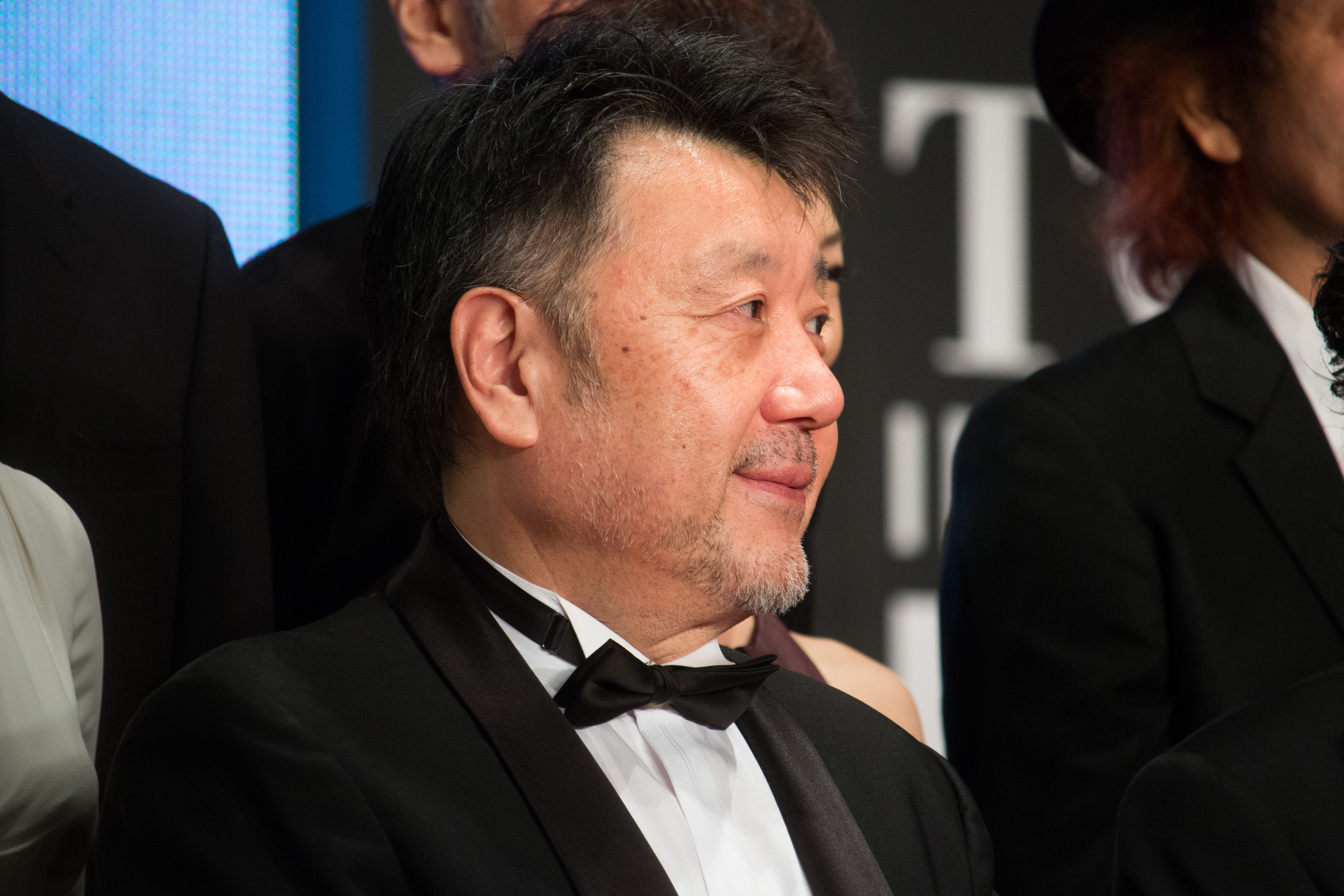
- Born: July 3, 1949; Numazu, Shizuoka Prefecture, Japan
- Died: December 8, 2025 (aged 76); Tokyo, Japan
- Occupations: Film director; screenwriter; film editor; critic; actor
- Years active: 1979–2025
- Spouse: Mizuho Fukuda (m. 1976)
- Children: Eugene Harada

Japanese name
- Kanji: 原田 眞人
- Hiragana: はらだ まさと
- Katakana: ハラダ マサト
Transcriptions
- Romanization: Harada Masato

Masato Harada (原田 眞人, Harada Masato; July 3, 1949 – December 8, 2025) was a Japanese film director, screenwriter, critic and occasional actor. He was nominated five times for the Japan Academy Film Prize for Best Director, among other accolades.

== Early life and education ==
Harada was born in Numazu, Shizuoka Prefecture and graduated from Higashi High School. In 1972, he went to London to learn English. He then attended Tokyo Visual Arts College and Pepperdine University.

During the latter part of the decade, he lived in Los Angeles, where he was a US correspondent for Kinema Junpo and Takarajima magazines, writing criticism and news about the American film industry. He cited American filmmakers Howard Hawks, Sam Peckinpah, and Don Siegel as influences, and befriended Hawks after meeting him at the San Sebastián International Film Festival.

== Career ==
Harada made his directorial debut in 1979, with Farewell, Movie Friend: Indian Summer. For several years, he worked as an English-to-Japanese subtitle and dubbing translator, including for two Star Wars films (The Empire Strikes Back and Return of the Jedi), Good Morning, Vietnam, Full Metal Jacket, and the DVD release of A Clockwork Orange.

He collaborated and showcased his works in Europe and US. His theatrical film credits included Gunhed (1989), Kamikaze Taxi (1995), Bounce Ko Gals (1997), Densen Uta (2007), Climber's High (2008), Chronicle of My Mother (2011), The Emperor in August (2015), and Sekigahara (2017). Among other accolades, he was nominated for the Japan Academy Film Prize for Best Director five times. His 2001 film Inugami was nominated for the Golden Bear at the Berlin International Film Festival.

He was best known to foreign audiences for his acting roles as Omura in Edward Zwick's The Last Samurai and as Mita in Ronny Yu's Fearless. In both roles, he portrayed the villain who wants Japan to westernize under the Meiji Restoration in the meantime trying to remove the old ways.

Harada also taught international relations at Nihon University.

== Personal life ==
He married journalist Mizuho Fukuda in 1976. They had a son, actor Eugene Harada.

=== Death ===
Harada died in a Tokyo hospital on December 8, 2025, at the age of 76.

== Filmography ==
=== Director ===
- Farewell, Movie Friend: Indian Summer (1979)
- Uindii (1984)
- Paris/Dakar 1500 (1986)
- The Heartbreak Yakuza (1987)
- Gunhed (1989)
- Tuff 5 (1992)
- Painted Desert (1993)
- Kamikaze Taxi (1995)
- Rowing Through (1996)
- Bounce Ko Gals (1997)
- Spellbound (1999)
- Inugami (2001)
- The Choice of Hercules (2002)
- Bluestockings (2005)
- Densen Uta (2007)
- The Shadow Spirit (2008)
- Climber's High (2008)
- Chronicle of My Mother (2011)
- Return (2013)
- Kakekomi (2015)
- The Emperor in August (2015)
- Sekigahara (2017)
- Killing for the Prosecution (2018)
- Baragaki: Unbroken Samurai (2021)
- Hell Dogs (2022)
- Bad Lands (2023)

=== Actor ===
- The Last Samurai (2003) – Mr. Omura
- Fearless (2006) – Mr. Mita
