= Chronicle of My Mother =

- Poster
- Directed by: Masato Harada
- Screenplay by: Masato Harada
- Based on: Waga haha no ki by Yasushi Inoue
- Produced by: Yoshitaka Ishizuka
- Starring: Kōji Yakusho; Kirin Kiki; Aoi Miyazaki
- Cinematography: Akiko Ashizawa
- Edited by: Eugene Harada
- Music by: Harumi Fuuki
- Production companies: P's international; King Records; Dentsu; Eisei Gekijo; CBC; Wako; Yahoo Japan; The Asahi Shimbun; The Shizuoka Shimbun; Toei Tokyo
- Distributed by: Shochiku
- Release dates: 27 August 2011 (WFF); 28 April 2012 (Japan)
- Running time: 108 minutes
- Country: Japan
- Language: Japanese

Chronicle of My Mother (Japanese: わが母の記, Hepburn: Waga haha no ki) is a 2011 Japanese drama film directed by Masato Harada, based on a novel of the same name by Yasushi Inoue.

== Cast ==
- Kōji Yakusho - Kosaku
- Kirin Kiki - Yae
- Aoi Miyazaki - Kotoko
- Kaho Minami - Kuwako
- Erina Mano - Sadayo
- Takahiro Miura - Segawa
- Rentarō Mikuni - Hayato

== Awards ==
Cinematographer Akiko Ashizawa won the award for best cinematography for her work on the film at the Mainichi Film Awards.
