= Daihachi Yoshida =

Japanese film director (born 1963)

- 吉田 大八
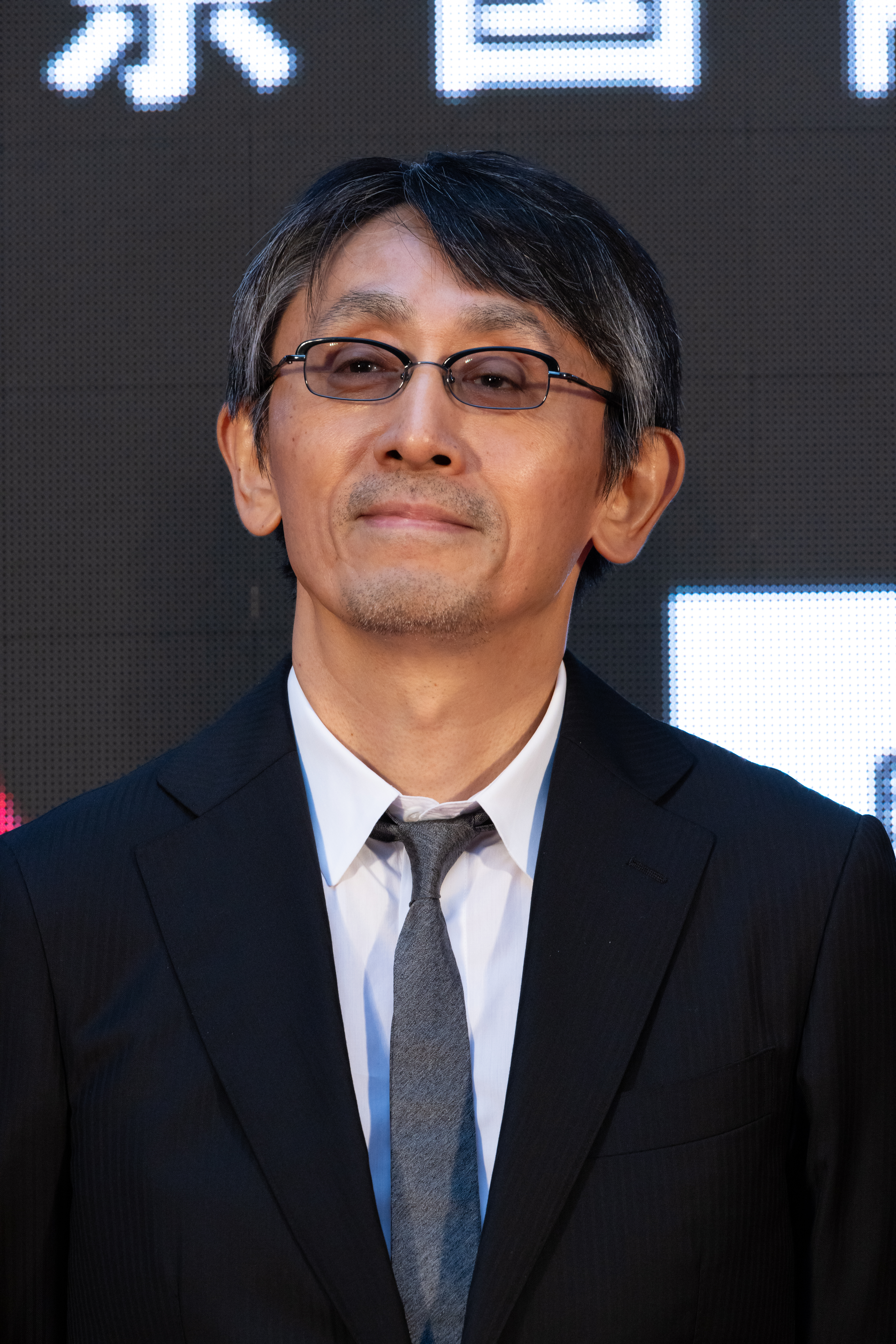
- Yoshida attending the 37th Tokyo International Film Festival in 2024
- Born: October 2, 1963 (age 61); Kagoshima Prefecture, Kyushu, Japan
- Occupation: Film director

Daihachi Yoshida (吉田 大八, Yoshida Daihachi) is a Japanese film director. He won the award for best new director at the 29th Yokohama Film Festival for Funuke Show Some Love, You Losers!.

== Filmography ==
- Funuke Show Some Love, You Losers! (2007)
- Kuhio Taisa (2009)
- Permanent Nobara (2010)
- The Kirishima Thing (2012)
- Pale Moon (2014)
- A Beautiful Star (2017)
- The Scythian Lamb (2018)
- Kiba: The Fangs of Fiction (2021)
- Teki Cometh (2025)
