= The Floating Castle =

- Poster
- のぼうの城
- Directed by: Shinji Higuchi; Isshin Inudo
- Screenplay by: Ryō Wada
- Based on: Nobō no Shiro by Ryō Wada
- Produced by: Osamu Kubota
- Starring: Mansai Nomura; Nana Eikura; Hiroki Narimiya; Tomomitsu Yamaguchi; Yusuke Kamiji; Takayuki Yamada; Takehiro Hira; Masachika Ichimura; Kōichi Satō
- Cinematography: Shoji Ebara; Motonobu Kiyoku
- Edited by: Soichi Ueno
- Music by: Kōji Ueno
- Production companies: C&I Entertainment; Asmik Ace Entertainment
- Distributed by: Toho; Asmik Ace Entertainment
- Release date: November 2, 2012 (Japan)
- Running time: 144 minutes
- Country: Japan
- Language: Japanese

The Floating Castle (Japanese: のぼうの城, Hepburn: Nobō no Shiro) is a 2012 Japanese historical drama film directed by Shinji Higuchi and Isshin Inudo, starring Mansai Nomura. It adapts Ryō Wada's 2007 novel of the same name.

Set in feudal Japan, the film is based on the Siege of Oshi and depicts the struggle of Oshi's villagers in defending their fortress against Toyotomi Hideyoshi's campaign against the Hojo clan. Against insurmountable odds, Narita Nagachika, the fortress's castellan, leads a group of 500 men against 20,000 men led by Ishida Mitsunari, part of Toyotomi clan's greater army of 200,000 samurai.

== Cast ==
- Mansai Nomura as Nagachika Narita
- Nana Eikura as Kaihime
- Hiroki Narimiya as Sakamaki
- Tomomitsu Yamaguchi as Izumi
- Kōichi Satō as Tanba
- Masachika Ichimura as Hideyoshi Toyotomi
- Takehiro Hira as Masaie Natsuka
- Takayuki Yamada as Yoshitsugu Otani
- Yusuke Kamiji as Mitsunari Ishida
- Masahiko Nishimura as Ujinaga Narita
- Sei Hiraizumi as Yasusue Narita
- Isao Natsuyagi as Monk
- Takeo Nakahara as Hojo Ujimasa
- Honami Suzuki as Tama
- Gin Maeda as Tahee
- Akiyoshi Nakao as Kazou
- Machiko Ono as Chiyo
- Mana Ashida as Chidori

== Production ==
The film was produced by the following studios.

- Asahi Shimbun
- Asatsu-DK
- Asmik Ace Entertainment
- Broadcasting System of Niigata
- C&I Entertainment
- Chubu-Nippon Broadcasting
- Chugoku Broadcasting
- Cybird Holdings
- East Japan Marketing & Communications
- Hakuhodo DY Media Partners
- Happinet
- Hokkaido Broadcasting
- Kou Shibusawa Production
- Mainichi Broadcasting System
- Nippon Shuppan Hanbai
- RKB Mainichi Broadcasting
- Shizuoka Broadcasting System
- Shogakukan
- Tokyo Broadcasting System
- TBS Radio & Communications
- Television Saitama (JAITS)
- UHF Television Yamanashi
- Toho
- Tohoku Broadcasting Company
- Tokyo FM
- Tsutaya Group
- WOWOW
- Yahoo! Japan

== Reception ==
Mark Adams of Screen International gave the film a favorable review, describing the film as an "epic period action-comedy packed with wonderfully over-the-top characters, great production values and some spectacular sequences".

== Awards ==
The film racked up ten nominations for the Japan Academy Prize, winning one for Best Art Direction. Additionally it was nominated for three Asian Film Awards.
