= List of Japanese films of 2013 =

A list of Japanese films that were released in Japan in 2013. 591 Japanese films were released, earning ¥117 billion (US$1.14 billion) and accounting for 60.6% of the total box office in Japan. 34 earned over ¥1 billion (US$9.68 million), with the highest-grossing being The Wind Rises with ¥12 billion (US$116 million).

== Highest-grossing films ==
Rank	Title	Director	Cast	Gross
1	The Wind Rises	Hayao Miyazaki	Hideaki Anno	¥12 billion
2	One Piece Film: Z	Tatsuya Nagamine	Mayumi Tanaka	¥6.87 billion
3	Doraemon: Nobita's Secret Gadget Museum	Yukiyo Teramoto	Wasabi Mizuta	¥3.98 billion
4	Detective Conan: Private Eye in the Distant Sea	Kobun Shizuno	Minami Takayama	¥3.63 billion
5	Midsummer's Equation	Hiroshi Nishitani	Masaharu Fukuyama	¥3.31 billion

== List of films ==
Opening	Title	Director	Cast	Genre	Notes	Ref
12 January	Aokigahara	Taku Shinjo	Aki Maeda, Masahiko Tsugawa	Romance	Based on a novel	
12 January	Aragure	Hajime Gonno	Nobuyuki Suzuki	Thriller		
12 January	Momoiro Sora o	Keiichi Kobayashi	Ai Ikeda, Ena Koshino, Reiko Fujiwara	Coming-of-age	Debuted at the 2012 Tokyo International Film Festival	
12 January	Shing Shing Shing	Kouhei Sanada	Hoshi Ishida, Miwako Wagatsuma	Romance	Inspired by a song	
12 January	Suzuki Sensei	Yuto Kawai	Hiroki Hasegawa	Drama	Based on a manga	
19 January	Flashback Memories 3D	Tetsuaki Matsue	Goma, Kosuke Tsuji, Kenta Tajika	Music documentary		
19 January	Dead Sushi	Noboru Iguchi	Rina Takeda	Comedy		
19 January	Tokyo Family	Yoji Yamada	Bunta Sugawara, Tomiko Ishii, Masahiko Nishimura	Drama	Based on the film Tokyo Story	
26 January	Himawari	Yoshihiro Oikawa	Kyōzō Nagatsuka	Drama		
26 January	Minasan, Sayonara	Yoshihiro Nakamura	Gaku Hamada	Drama	Based on a novel	
26 January	Sayonara Debussy	Go Riju	Ai Hashimoto, Shinya Kiyozuka		Based on a novel	
26 January	Shiawase Come on	Daisuke Nakamura	Sawa Suzuki, Yuma Ishigaki	Drama		
26 January	Strawberry Night	Yuichi Sato	Takao Osawa	Mystery	Continuation of a television series of the same name	
26 January	Tsuya no Yoru	Isao Yukisada	Hiroshi Abe	Romance	Based on a novel	
26 January	Night People	Hajime Kadoi	Eriko Sato	Drama	Based on a collection of short stories	
1 February	Documentary of AKB48: No Flower Without Rain	Eiki Takahashi	Members of AKB48	Documentary		
2 February	Kiiroi Jou	Ryuichi Hiroki	Aoi Miyazaki, Osamu Mukai	Drama	Based on a novel	
9 February	Nao Otoko	Tomoyuki Takimoto	Toma Ikuta	Mystery	Based on a novel	
15 February	Hello! Junichi	Katsuhito Ishii, Kanoko Kawaguchi	Amon Kabe, Hikari Mitsushima	Drama		
22 February	It's a Beautiful Day	Kayoko Asakura	Kim Kkot-bi	Horror	Japanese-American co-production	
23 February	Yokomichi Yonosuke	Shūichi Okita	Kengo Kora, Yuriko Yoshitaka, Sosuke Ikematsu			
23 February	Sōgen no Isu	Izuru Narushima	Kōichi Satō	Drama	Based on a novel; First ever film to be filmed in Hunza	
2 March	Sue, Mai & Sawa: Righting the Girl Ship	Osamu Minorikawa	Kou Shibasaki, Yoko Maki, Shinobu Terajima	Drama		
9 March	Doraemon: Nobita no Himitsu Dōgu Museum	Yuichi Shinbo	Wasabi Mizuda, Megumi Ohara	Anime		
16 March	Bozo	Tatsushi Ōmori	Shingo Mizusawa	Drama	Based on actual events	
16 March	Himawari to Koinu no Nanokakan	Emiko Hiramatsu	Masato Sakai	Drama	Based on a novel	
23 March	Daijōbu 3 Kumi	Ryuichi Hiroki	Taichi Kokubun	Drama	Based on a novel	
30 March	Dragon Ball Z: Battle of Gods			Anime	Based on a manga; first theatrical Dragon Ball film since Dragon Ball: The Path to Power in 1996	
30 March	Hanasaku Iroha: The Movie – Home Sweet Home	Masahiro Andō	Kanae Itō, Chiaki Omigawa, Aki Toyosaki, Haruka Tomatsu, Mamiko Noto, Yuki Kaji, Takako Honda, Tamie Kubota, Kenji Hamada, Junji Majima, Taro Yamaguchi, Ayumi Tsunematsu, Junichi Suwabe, Chō	Anime	Side story of Hanasaku Iroha (2011)	
6 April	Orpheus' Lyre / Sakura, Futatabi no Kanako	Minoru Kurimura	Ryōko Hirosue, Goro Inagaki	Drama	Based on a novel	
13 April	The Great Passage	Yuya Ishii	Ryuhei Matsuda, Aoi Miyazaki	Drama	Based on a novel	
20 April	Detective Conan: Private Eye in the Distant Sea	Kobun Shizuno		Animation	Based on a manga	
20 April	Chūgakusei Maruyama	Kankuro Kudo	Tsuyoshi Kusanagi, Hiraoka Takuma	Drama		
20 April	Steins;Gate: Fuka Ryōiki no Déjà vu			Animation	Based on a video game	
26 April	Wara no Tate	Takashi Miike	Tatsuya Fujiwara	Thriller	Based on a novel	
27 April	Library Wars	Shinsuke Sato	Junichi Okada, Nana Eikura	Sci-fi	Based on a light novel	
11 May	Kenchou Omotenashi Ka	Yoshishige Miyake	Ryo Nishikido, Maki Horikita	Romance	Based on a novel	
11 May	Tantei Wa Bar Ni Iru 2	Hajime Hashimoto	Yo Oizumi, Ryuhei Matsuda	Mystery	Based on a novel	
18 May	Tabidachi no Shimauta: Jūgo No Haru	Yasuhiro Yoshida	Ayaka Miyoshi	Coming-of-age		
18 May	The Complex	Hideo Nakata	Atsuko Maeda, Hiroki Narimiya	Horror		
25 May	Kuchizuke	Yukihiko Tsutsumi	Shihori Kanjiya, Takayuki Takuma	Romance	Based on a stage play	
25 May	Ore Ore	Satoshi Miki	Kazuya Kamenashi	Mystery	Based on a novel	
25 May	Taishibōkei Tanita no Shain Shokudō	Toshio Lee	Yūka, Masao Kusakari, Kenta Hamano	Drama	Based on a true story	
1 June	Riaru Kanzen: Naru Kubinagaryu no Hi	Kiyoshi Kurosawa	Takeru Sato, Haruka Ayase	Drama	Based on a novel	
14 June	Zekkyō Gakkyū		Haruna Kawaguchi, Alice Hirose	Horror	Based on a manga	
29 June	Midsummer's Equation	Hiroshi Nishitani	Masaharu Fukuyama, Yuriko Yoshitaka, Kazuki Kitamura	police procedural	Based on novels	
6 July	Gintama: The Movie: The Final Chapter: Be Forever Yorozuya			Anime	Based on a manga series	
13 July	ExtremeSpeed Genesect: Mewtwo Awakens	Kunihiko Yuyama		Anime	Based on an anime series	
20 July	Short Peace	Shuhei Morita, Katsuhiro Otomo, Hiroaki Ando, Hajime Katoki		Anime		
20 July	Kaze Tachinu	Hayao Miyazaki		Anime	Based on a manga	
20 July	Shanidaru no Hana	Gakuryu Ishii	Gou Ayano, Haru Kuroki	Drama		
10 August	Enoshima Prism	Yasuhiro Yoshida	Sota Fukushi, Shūhei Nomura, Tsubasa Honda	Sci-fi fantasy		
17 August	School Girl Complex Hōsōbu Hen	Yūichi Onuma	Aoi Morikawa, Mugi Kadowaki, Maaya Kondō			
24 August	Gatchaman	Toya Sato	Tori Matsuzaka		Based on an anime series	
24 August	Jōkyō Monogatari		Kii Kitano, Fumino Kimura, Asuka Kurosawa		Based on a manga	
31 August	Natsu no Owari	Kazuyoshi Kumakiri	Hikari Mitsushima, Kaoru Kobayashi, Gou Ayano	Drama	Based on a novel	
7 September	Space Pirate Captain Harlock	Shinji Aramaki		Anime		
7 September	Usotsuki Paradox	Kōta Yoshida			Based on a manga	
28 September	Why Don't You Play in Hell?	Sion Sono	Jun Kunimura, Shinichi Tsutsumi	Drama		
5 October	Soshite Chichi ni Naru	Hirokazu Koreeda	Masaharu Fukuyama	Drama		
8 November	Judge					
9 November	The Kiyosu Conference	Kōki Mitani	Kōji Yakusho, Yo Oizumi, Kenichi Matsuyama	period comedy		
9 November	Patema Inverted	Yasuhiro Yoshiura		Anime fantasy		
9 November	Shijukunichi no Recipe	Yuki Tanada	Renji Ishibashi	Drama	Based on a novel	
23 November	Bayonetta: Bloody Fate	Fuminori Kizaki		Anime		
23 November	Persona 3 The Movie: Chapter 1, Spring of Birth			Anime		
23 November	Kaguya-Hime no Monogatari	Isao Takahata		Anime	Based on the Japanese folktale of the same name.	
7 December	Lupin the 3rd vs. Detective Conan: The Movie	Hajime Kamegaki		Anime		
7 December	Ask This of Rikyu	Mitsutoshi Tanaka	Ebizo Ichikawa	Drama	Based on a novel	
14 December	Kanojo wa Uso o Aishisugiteru	Norihiro Koizumi		Romance	Based on a manga	
21 December	Mugiko-san to	Keisuke Yoshida	Maki Horikita, Ryuhei Matsuda			
21 December	The Eternal Zero	Takashi Yamazaki	Haruma Miura	Drama	Based on a novel	
27 December	Hunter × Hunter: The Last Mission	Keiichiro Kawaguchi		Anime		
28 December	Majocco Shimai no Yoyo to Nene	Takayuki Hirao	Sumire Morohoshi, Ai Kakuma	Anime fantasy		
