= 15th Japan Film Professional Awards =

Japanese film awards in 2006

- Date: 2006

The 15th Japan Film Professional Awards (第15回日本映画プロフェッショナル大賞) is the 15th edition of the Japan Film Professional Awards. Films of 2005 were eligible, with a focus on independent works not released by major distribution companies. An award ceremony did not take place.

== Awards ==
- Best Film: Itsuka dokusho suruhi
- Best Director: Nobuhiro Yamashita (Linda Linda Linda)
- Best Actress: Yūko Tanaka (Itsuka dokusho suruhi, Hibi)
- Best Actress: Kyōko Koizumi (Hanging Garden)
- Best Actor: Joe Odagiri (House of Himiko, Scrap Heaven)
- Best Actor: Hidetoshi Nishijima (Kikyō, Sayonara Midori-chan, Ame Yori Setsunaku)
- Best New Director: Tatsushi Ōmori (The Whispering of the Gods)
- Best New Director: Kenji Uchida (A Stranger of Mine)

== 10 best films ==
1. Itsuka dokusho suruhi (Akira Ogata)
2. Linda Linda Linda (Nobuhiro Yamashita)
3. Break Through! (Kazuyuki Izutsu)
4. Hanging Garden (Toshiaki Toyoda)
5. A Stranger of Mine (Kenji Uchida)
6. Curtain Call (Kiyoshi Sasabe)
7. The Whispering of the Gods (Tatsushi Ōmori)
8. Lakeside Murder Case (Shinji Aoyama)
9. House of Himiko (Isshin Inudo)
10. Canary (Akihiko Shiota)
