= 33rd Yokohama Film Festival =

2012 film festival in Yokohama, Japan

- Location: Yokohama, Kanagawa, Japan
- Founded: 1980
- Festival date: 2012

The 33rd Yokohama Film Festival (第33回ヨコハマ映画祭) was held in 2012 in Yokohama, Kanagawa, Japan.

== Awards ==
- Best Film: - Someday
- Best Director: Sion Sono - Cold Fish and Guilty of Romance
- Best New Director:
  - Mami Sunada - Ending Note: Death of a Japanese Salaryman
  - Kōji Maeda - Konzen Tokkyū
- Best Screenplay: Aya Watanabe (refused) - The Town’s Children
- Best Cinematographer: Junichi Fujisawa - Rebirth
- Best Actor: Eita - Tada's Do-It-All House
- Best Actress: Yuriko Yoshitaka - Konzen Tokkyū
- Best Supporting Actor: Denden - Cold Fish
- Best Supporting Actress:
  - Megumi Kagurazaka - Cold Fish and Guilty of Romance
  - Asuka Kurosawa - Cold Fish
- Best Newcomer:
  - Tori Matsuzaka - We Can't Change the World. But, We Wanna Build a School in Cambodia. and Life Back Then
  - Kiki Sugino - Hospitalité
  - Kenta Hamano - Konzen Tokkyū
- Yokohama Film Festival Best Actor: Yoshio Harada

== Best 10 ==
1. Someday
2. Cold Fish
3. Rebirth
4. Guilty of Romance
5. Postcard
6. Life Back Then
7. Moteki
8. Konzen Tokkyū
9. Ending Note: Death of a Japanese Salaryman
10. Tada's Do-It-All House, The Town’s Children
