= Kanehara =

Kanehara (written: 金原) is a Japanese surname. Notable people with the surname include:

- Hiromitsu Kanehara (金原 弘光, born 1970), Japanese mixed martial artist
- Hitomi Kanehara (金原 ひとみ, born 1983), Japanese writer
- Masanori Kanehara (金原 正徳, born 1982), Japanese mixed martial artist
