= Akaji Maro =

Japanese actor (born 1943)

- 麿 赤児
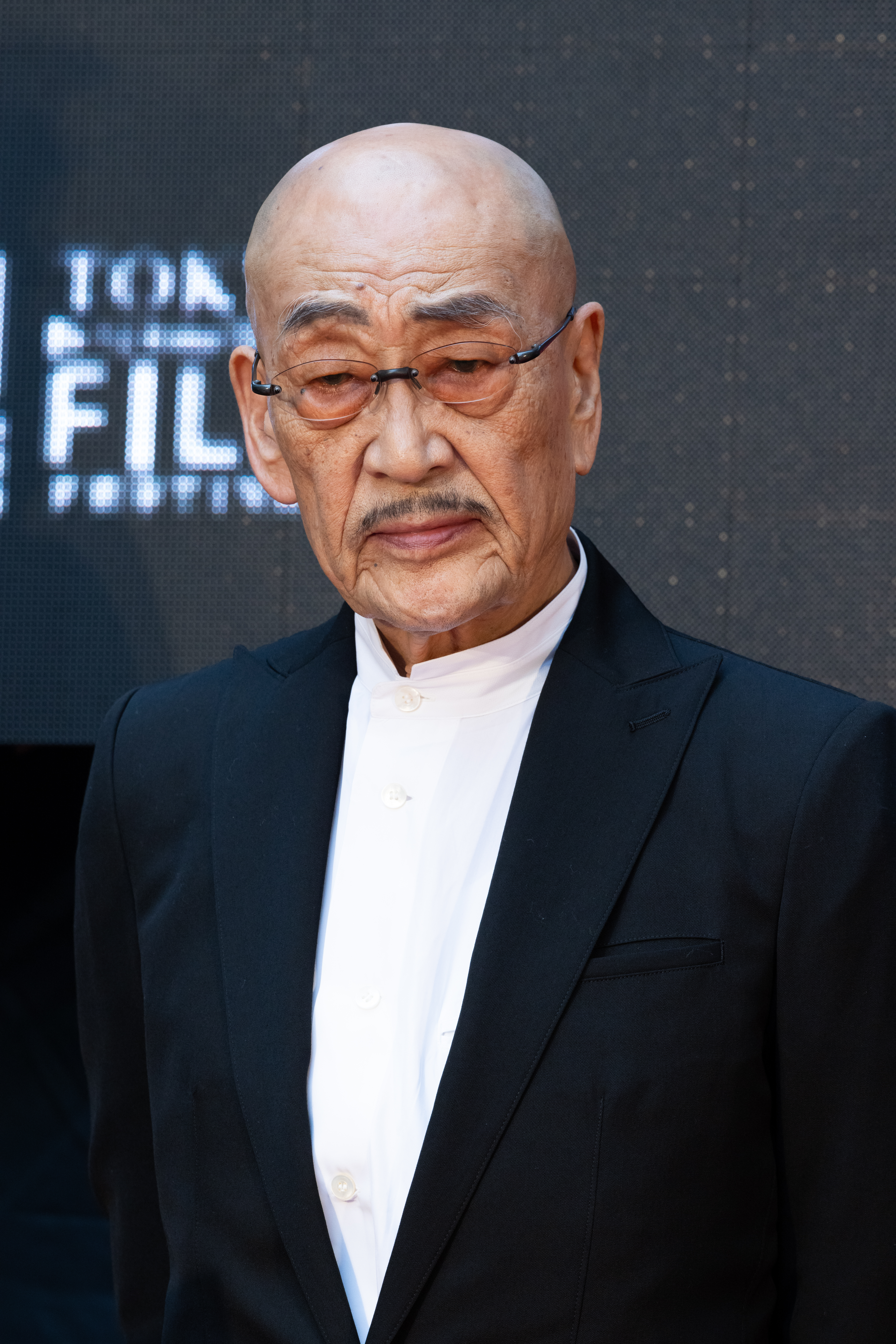
- Akaji at the Tokyo International Film Festival in 2024
- Born: February 23, 1943 (age 83); Kanazawa, Japan
- Occupations: Butoh artist, theater director and actor.
- Years active: 1964–present
- Children: Tatsushi Ōmori; Nao Ōmori

Akaji Maro (麿 赤児, Maro Akaji; born February 23, 1943) is a Japanese butoh performer, theater director, and film actor.

== Early life ==
In 1943, Maro was born in Sakurai, Nara, Japan.

== Career ==
In 1972, Maro founded the Dairakudakan Temputenshiki (大駱駝艦・天賦典式, The Great Camel Battleship), a large-scale butoh company which has gained an enduring international reputation.

Maro's film career began in 1980. As an actor, he has appeared in over 42 films.

== Personal life ==
Maro has two sons: Tatsushi Ōmori, who is a film director, and Nao Ōmori, an actor.

== Filmography ==
=== Film ===
- Inflatable Sex Doll of the Wastelands (1967)
- Ke no haeta kenjû (1968), Taka
- Diary of a Shinjuku Thief (1969)
- Yami no naka no chimimoryo (1971), Kinzo
- Kuroki Taro no ai to bôken (1977)
- Zigeunerweisen (1980)
- Kagero-za (1981), Homeless
- Burst City (1982)
- Yaju-deka (1982), Painter
- Mitsugetsu (1984)
- Shinran: Path to Purity (1987), Nanzame
- Nijisseiki shônen dokuhon (1989), Tattoo Master
- Dotsuitarunen (1989), Daisuke Kamoi
- Ware ni utsu yoi ari (1990), Sakurada
- Yumeji (1991)
- Waga jinsei saiaku no toki (1993), Lt. Nakayama
- Tsuki wa dotchi ni dete iru (1993), Senba
- Heya (1993)
- Shishioh-tachi no saigo (1993), Sakurai
- Kowagaru hitobito (1994), Man of dry river bed
- Aozora ni ichiban chikai basho (1994)
- Yamato Takeru (1994)
- Heisei musekinin-ikka: Tokyo de luxe (1995), Kanji, Nobuko's father
- Harukana jidai no kaidan o (1995), Detective
- Gogo no Yuigon-jo (1995)
- That's Cunning! Shijo saidai no sakusen (1996)
- Dangan Runner (1996)
- Wana (1996), Detective
- Moonlight Serenade (1997)
- Kizu darake no tenshi (1997), Owner of the firm
- Postman Blues (1997), Boss of Minato gang
- Cat's Eye (1997)
- Lie lie Lie (1997), Den
- Pieta (1997), Cop
- Anrakkî monkî (1998), Hobo
- Shinsei toire no Hanako-san (1998)
- Kunoichi ninpô-chô: Yagyû gaiden (1998), Tenkai
- Pornostar (1998), Yakuza Boss
- Gedo (1998), Kuwata
- Shin karajishi kabushiki kaisha (1999)
- Kikujiro (1999), Crazy Man
- Tenshi ni misuterareta yoru (1999), Aota
- Gemini (1999), Kakubê
- The City of Lost Souls (2000)
- Swing Man (2000), Oda
- Kamen gakuen (2001), Daimon
- Monday (2000)
- Utsushimi (2000), Himself
- Suicide Club (2001), Detective Murata
- Gin no otoko (2001, part 1, 2)
- KT (2002), Susumu Kawahara
- Shangri-La (2002), Ookura Nagashima
- Drive (2002), Lord Kobari, ghost warrior
- Jam Films (2002) (segment "Pandora - Hong Kong Leg")
- Gangu shuriya (2002), Mr. Iwai
- Samurai Resurrection (2003), Ieyasu Tokugawa
- 9 Souls (2003), Owner of Candy Shop
- Kill Bill: Volume 1 (2003), Boss Ozawah
- Akame shijuya taki shinju misui (2003)
- Kill Bill: Volume 2 (2004), Boss Ozawah
- Kill Bill: The Whole Bloody Affair (2004), Boss Ozawah
- Wairudo furawazu (2004)
- The Reason (2004), A-san
- Yume no naka e (2005)
- The Whispering of the Gods (2005), Shopkeeper
- Damejin (2006)
- Pacchigi! Love & Peace (2007)
- Hadaka no natsu (2008)
- Shôrin shôjo (2008), Rin's Master
- Asahiyama dôbutsuen: Pengin ga sora o tobu (2008)
- Sakigake!! Otokojuku (2008), Heihachi Edajima
- Futoko (2009)
- Mogera wogura (2009)
- Kazura (2010)
- Meon (2010)
- Postcard (2010), Monk
- Yakuza Weapon (2011)
- Tada's Do-It-All House (2011), Oka
- Hanezu (2011), Yo-chan archeologist
- Gokudô meshi (2011)
- Tenshi tsukinuke rokuchoume (2011)
- Kôun no tsubo (2012), Yonosuke
- SPEC: Ten (2012), Akira Nitanai
- TAP: Kanzennaru shiiku (2013)
- A no dentou (2014)
- Zipang Punk (2014), Toyotomi Hideyoshi
- Mahoro ekimae kyôsôkyoku (2014)
- Kakekomi (2015), Seisetsu
- The Emperor in August (2015), Hisanori Fujita
- The Projects (2016), Gondo
- Nekonin (2017), Katsuragi
- Sekigahara (2017), Shimazu Yoshihiro
- Uta Monogatari: Cinema Fighters Project (2018), On (segment "Kuu")
- Turquoise no Sora no Shita de (2018)
- Fly Me to the Saitama (2019), Sojuro Saionji
- Birdsong (2019), Akira
- Ghost Master (2019)
- Katsu Fūtarō!! (2019)
- Hell Girl (2019), Wanyūdō
- Dreams on Fire (2021)
- Under the Turquoise Sky (2021)
- Daughter of Lupin the Movie (2021)
- Tombi: Father and Son (2022)
- Ox-Head Village (2022)
- Fullmetal Alchemist: The Revenge of Scar (2022)
- Old School (2022)
- We Make Antiques! Osaka Dreams (2023)
- Love Will Tear Us Apart (2023), Ogata
- A Day Begins (2024)
- We Are Aliens (2024)
- Kaiju Guy! (2025)
- Or Utopia (2025)

=== Television ===
- Kindaichi Case Files (1996)
- Psychometrer Eiji (1997)
- Aoi (2000), Shimazu Yoshihiro
- Yasashii Jikan (2005)
- GARO (2006)
- Yamada Tarō Monogatari (2007)
- Atsuhime (2008)
- Gunshi Kanbei (2014), Enman
- Smoking (2018), Sunaji
- Manpuku (2018)
- Daughter of Lupin (2019–20)
- Hayabusa Fire Brigade (2023), Tasuku Enishi
- Brothers in Arms (2026), Saitō Dōsan
