= 23rd Japan Film Professional Awards =

Japanese film awards in 2014

- Date: June 28, 2014
- Site: Theatre Shinjuku, Tokyo, Japan

The 23rd Japan Film Professional Awards (第23回日本映画プロフェッショナル大賞) was the 23rd edition of the Japan Film Professional Awards. Films of 2013 which had not already won a major domestic film award were eligible. The ceremony took place on June 28, 2014, at Theatre Shinjuku in Tokyo.

== Awards ==
- Best Film: Bozo
- Best Director: Shūichi Okita (The Story of Yonosuke)
- Best Actress: Atsuko Maeda (Tamako in Moratorium)
- Best Actor: Kengo Kora (The Story of Yonosuke)
- Best New Director: Ryōhei Watanabe (Shady)
- Best New Encouragement: Cast of The Vortex of Love
- Best New Actress: Mayuko Iwasa (Cult, Passion)
- Best New Male Actor: Shingo Mizusawa (Bozo)
- Special: Tetsuaki Matsue (Flashback Memories 3D)

== 10 best films ==
1. Bozo (Tatsushi Ōmori)
2. The Vortex of Love (Hitoshi Ōne)
3. The Story of Yonosuke (Shūichi Okita)
4. The Backwater (Shinji Aoyama)
5. Flashback Memories 3D (Tetsuaki Matsue)
6. Tamako in Moratorium (Nobuhiro Yamashita)
7. See You Tomorrow, Everyone (Yoshihiro Nakamura)
8. Hello, My Dolly Girlfriend (Takashi Ishii)
9. A Band Rabbit and a Boy (Takuji Suzuki)
10. Real (Kiyoshi Kurosawa)
