= Aimi Satsukawa =

Japanese actress (born 1988)

- 佐津川 愛美
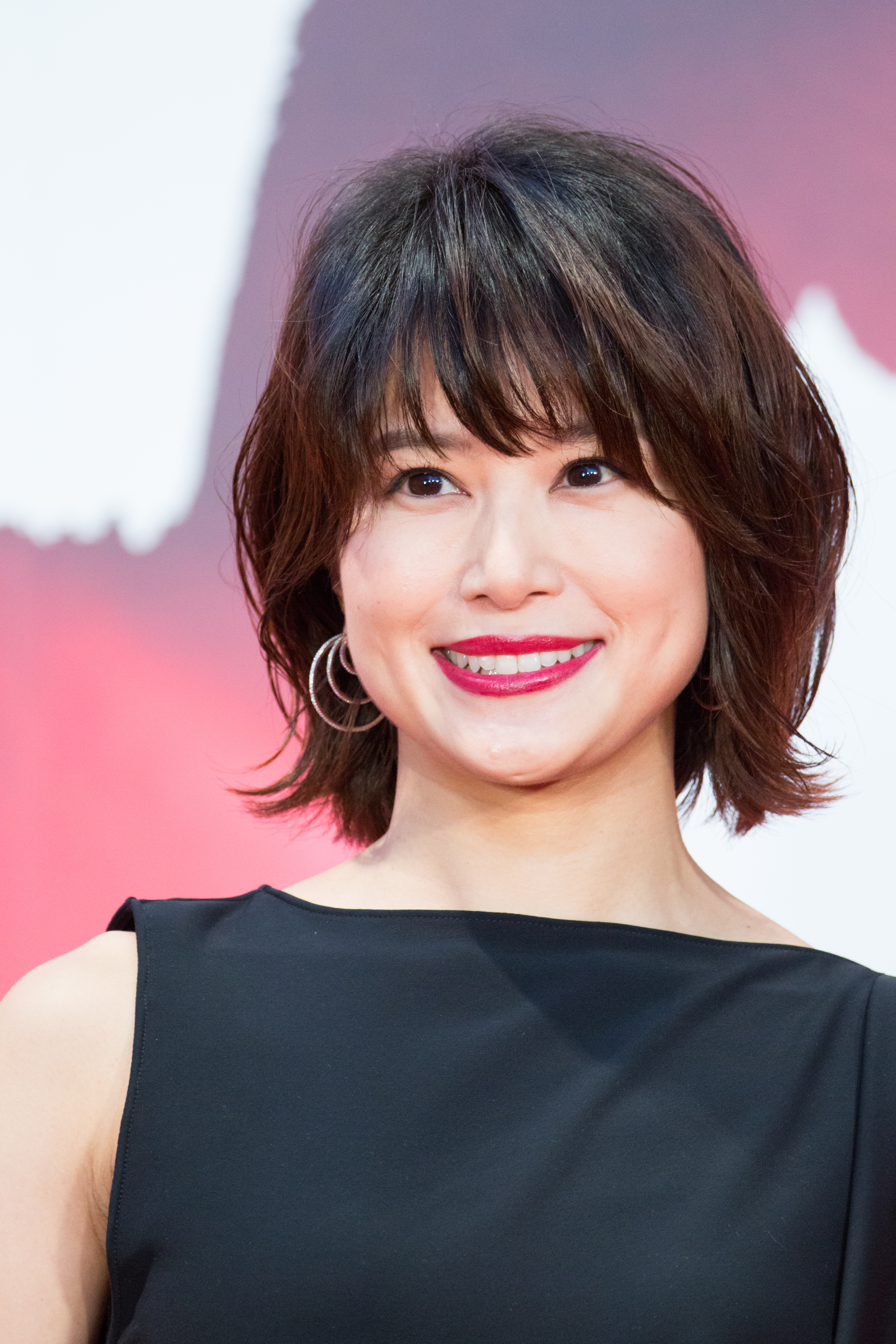
- Satsukawa at the 30th Tokyo International Film Festival in October 2017
- Born: August 20, 1988 (age 38); Shizuoka Prefecture, Japan
- Occupation: Actress
- Years active: 2004–present
- Website: Aimi Satsukawa Official Site

Aimi Satsukawa (佐津川 愛美, Satsukawa Aimi; born August 20, 1988) is a Japanese actress affiliated with Horipro. She is from the Shizuoka Prefecture. She also goes by the alias Sattsun.

== Career ==
At age 14, Satsukawa was scouted for the entertainment industry. In 2004, she moved to Tokyo while entering high school.

Satsukawa initially entered the entertainment industry casually, and she stated in an interview with Arubaito News Plus that even though she auditioned for various dramas and movies, she felt as if she was somewhat of a stranger to the industry, sometimes thinking things like, "I wish the person next to me would get the job". In 2005, in her first film role, The Samurai I Loved, she played the role of the character Fuku as a young girl and was nominated for the 48th Blue Ribbon Award for Best Supporting Actress. This film was a turning point for her as well, and she says that when she saw the completed film, she got a sense of what it means to be a professional and she became determined to take acting seriously as an actor.

She was known for playing characters that had a neat and clean image up until her role in the film Funuke Show Some Love, You Losers!, where she played the role of a character with a darker personality. She was nominated for two categories at the 50th annual Blue Ribbon Awards: Best Supporting Actress and Best Newcomer.

Satsukawa competed in the Junior Olympic Rhythmic Gymnastics National Championships, where she placed 24th overall.

== Filmography ==
=== Film ===
| Year | Title | Role | Notes | Ref. |
|---|---|---|---|---|
| 2005 | The Samurai I Loved | young Fuku | | |
| 2007 | Funuke Show Some Love, You Losers! | Kyomi Wago | | |
| 2009 | Elevator Trap | Kaoru Aikyō | | |
| 2010 | Help of God | Nao Kishita | | |
| 2013 | The Story of Yonosuke | Mutsumi Toi | | |
| 2014 | Oretachi no Ashita | Kizuna Gen | | |
| 2014 | Gujira no Ita Natsu | Yumiko | | |
| 2014 | Kikaider Reboot | Mitsuko Kohmyoji | | |
| 2014 | Wakusei Mizusa | Mizusa | Lead role | |
| 2016 | Himeanole | Yuka Abe | | |
| 2016 | Sadako vs. Kayako | Natsumi Ueno | | |
| 2016 | Zenin, Kataomoi | Yuki Minamino | | |
| 2016 | Dareka no Mokkin | Yui Shindō | | |
| 2017 | Lights of Kyoto | Satsuki | | |
| 2017 | Yurigokoro | Mitsuko | | |
| 2017 | Poncho | Ai | | |
| 2017 | Revenge Girl | Rinko Momose | | |
| 2017 | A Loving Husband | Yumi Miyamoto | | |
| 2018 | Hoshimeguri no Machi | Maki Domon | | |
| 2018 | On My Way Home | Kanae Noda | | |
| 2018 | Zenigata | Tama Saotome | | |
| 2019 | Day and Night | Yurika | | |
| 2019 | La | Midwife | | |
| 2019 | Confidence Man JP | Rika Yajima | | |
| 2019 | Kurayamisai no Ogawa San | Misa | | |
| 2020 | He Won't Kill, She Won't Die | Kyapiko's mother | | |
| 2020 | Okaeri Tadaima | Rie | | |
| 2020 | Life: Untitled | Atsuko | | |
| 2021 | Every Trick in the Book | Nanami Kōchi | | |
| 2021 | The Woman of S.R.I. the Movie | Mihoko Hata | | |
| 2021 | The End of the Pale Hour | Mika | | |
| 2024 | Toxic Daughter | Hagino Fukase | Lead role | |
| 2024 | Stay Mum | Hisae | | |
| 2024 | Buzzy Noise | | | |
| 2026 | Hyoketsu | | | |
| 2026 | Part-time Death Angel | Kana Hirooka | | |
| 2026 | Love Me Kill Me | Kurosawa | | |
| 2027 | Akiramemasen! | | | |

=== Television ===
| Year | Title | Role | Notes | Ref. |
|---|---|---|---|---|
| 2004 | True Horror Stories: Summer 2004 | Maki Tachibana | Lead role, episode 13: Hitori Bocchi no Shōjo | |
| 2020 | A Day-Off of Ryoma Takeuchi | Yuna | Episode 4 | |
| 2022 | Chimudondon | Kiyoe Ino | Asadora | |
