= Tada's Do-It-All House =

2011 film

- DVD cover
- Directed by: Tatsushi Ōmori
- Screenplay by: Tatsushi Ōmori
- Based on: Mahoro ekimae Tada benriken by Shion Miura
- Produced by: Tomomi Yoshimura; Tomoo Tsuchii
- Starring: Eita; Ryuhei Matsuda; Tasuku Emoto; Manami Honjō; Reiko Kataoka
- Cinematography: Ryo Otsuka
- Edited by: Ryo Hayano
- Music by: Shigeru Kishida
- Production companies: Asmik Ace Entertainment; Happinet; Yahoo Japan; Tsutaya Group; Yoake Pictures; Little More
- Distributed by: Nikkatsu
- Release date: 23 April 2011 (Japan)
- Running time: 123 minutes
- Country: Japan
- Language: Japanese

Tada's Do-It-All House (Japanese: まほろ駅前多田便利軒, Hepburn: Mahoro ekimae Tada benriken) is a 2011 Japanese drama film directed by Tatsushi Ōmori, based on a 2006 novel by Shion Miura. It rotates around a down-on-his-luck handyman who reunites with an old friend from his middle school days, who winds up joining his business.

A sequel television series based on the sequel book, also starring Eita and Matsuda, aired in 2013 on TV Tokyo. A second film based on the third book in the series premiered in 2014.

== Cast ==
- Eita as Keisuke Tada
- Ryuhei Matsuda as Haruhiko Gyōten
- Tasuku Emoto as Yamashita
- Manami Honjō as Nagiko Sanmine
- Reiko Kataoka as Lulu
- Ittoku Kishibe as Hayasaka
- Kengo Kora as Hoshi
- Akaji Maro as Oka
- Suzuki Matsuo as Shinchan
- Masaki Miura
- Yuko Nakamura as Mari's mother
- Nao Ōmori as Yamada
