= Dareka no Mokkin =

- Film poster
- Directed by: Yōichi Higashi
- Screenplay by: Yōichi Higashi
- Based on: Dareka no Mokkin by Areno Inoue
- Produced by: Tetsujiro Yamagami; Shiro Kido; Eiji Watanabe; Toshiaki Suzuki; Keisuke Tanaka; Naoya Kinoshita; Toramatsu Mamiya; Atsushi Sugai; Yosuke Miyake; Jun Nakamura
- Starring: Takako Tokiwa; Sosuke Ikematsu; Aimi Satsukawa; Masanobu Katsumura; Maho Yamada
- Cinematography: Tomohiko Tsuji
- Edited by: Yōichi Higashi; Yuji Ohshige
- Music by: Takatsugu Muramatsu
- Production companies: SIGLO Ltd.; Horipro
- Distributed by: Kino Films
- Release date: 10 September 2016 (Japan)
- Running time: 112 minutes
- Country: Japan
- Language: Japanese

Dareka no Mokkin (Japanese: だれかの木琴), also known as Somebody's Xylophone in English, is a 2016 Japanese suspense drama film directed by Yōichi Higashi. It was adapted by Higashi from a novel of the same name by Areno Inoue. Dareka no Mokkin was the final film directed by Higashi, who died in 2026. The film tells the story of a married, middle-aged housewife who finds herself growing dangerously infatuated with her young hairdresser. It stars Takako Tokiwa in the lead role, in addition to Sosuke Ikematsu, Aimi Satsukawa, Masanobu Katsumura and Maho Yamada. Takatsugu Muramatsu composed the film's score, while its theme song "The Final News" was performed by Yōsui Inoue. Dareka no Mokkin was shown at the 29th Tokyo International Film Festival in the Japan Now section, before being theatrically released by Kino Films on 10 September 2016, in Japan.

== Premise ==
Sayoko Oyomi is a seemingly happy, middle-aged housewife who lives with her kind husband Kotaro, a salaryman at a security equipment company, and her teenage daughter Kanna. They have recently moved to the suburbs. Sayoko locates a beauty salon near her new house. On her first outing to the salon, her hair is cut by hairdresser Kaito Yamada. Sayoko believes that they have hit it off, and after returning home, she receives a courtesy follow-up email from Kaito. Sayoko finds herself becoming hopelessly infatuated with the young man. She replies to his email and, through conversations at the beauty salon, figures out his home address. Her obsession with Kaito gradually escalates out of control. Kaito's girlfriend, Yui, becomes involved, and soon Kaito begins to feel that he is in danger.

== Cast ==
- Takako Tokiwa as Sayoko Oyomi
- Sosuke Ikematsu as Kaito Yamada
- Aimi Satsukawa as Yui Shindō
- Masanobu Katsumura as Kotaro Oyomi
- Maho Yamada
- Yukino Kishii
- Mantaro Koichi
- Takahito Hosoyamada
- Aoba Kawai
- Yukijirō Hotaru
- Kou Maehara
- Mikoto Kimura

== Background ==
Inoue's novel was first published on 26 July 2011, by Gentosha, and republished in paperback on 10 February 2014, by the same company. Director Higashi saw the novel in a bookstore and, intrigued by its title, bought it. He was attracted to the ambiguity of the story and decided to adapt it into a film.

== Production ==
Higashi and Tokiwa had a good relationship on set, with Higashi stating that "I didn't have to consult with her about a single scene or single cut".

Tokiwa said she had no trouble understanding her character's motivations, stating that some may view her actions as stalking, while others might see them as an "expression of pure love", but that ultimately "The choice of where to draw that line is up to the individual." On the same topic, Higashi said, "There's no clear borderline with one side normal and the other abnormal – both can exist in the same person."

Ikematsu's acting style was unexpected but appreciated by both Higashi and Tokiwa, with Tokiwa saying, "One thing Ikematsu has been doing right all along is to take long pauses between lines. It's because he's being honest about his feelings, I think. He waits until he wants to say his next line. So the pauses become really long."

Higashi was 84 when he made Dareka no Mokkin. It proved to be his final film, as he died in 2026.

== Release ==
Dareka no Mokkin was theatrically released by Kino Films on 10 September 2016, in Japan. The film was later released to DVD on 8 March 2017, by Toei Video.

The film was later screened as part of the Japan Foundation's Touring Film Programme in the UK.

== Reception ==
In a review for The Japan Times, Mark Schilling awarded the film 3.5 out of 5 stars. Schilling wrote that director Higashi was known for "drawing career-peak performances from his leading ladies," and he believed this was also the case for Takako Tokiwa in Dareka no Mokkin. He also stated that the film "becomes a probing character study of a woman who refuses to fall into any of the expected categories, from deluded stalker to desperate housewife." He concluded by writing that there was "nothing moralistic in... the movie as a whole. Its heroine is neither bad nor mad, but for once, in a life otherwise unexceptional, she feels compelled to follow her heart, however wayward or strange she looks to others."
