= Mahokaru Numata =

Japanese writer (born 1948)

- Born: 1948 (age 77–78); Osaka Prefecture, Japan
- Occupation: Writer
- Writing career
- Language: Japanese
- Genres: Crime fiction, thriller, horror
- Notable awards: Horror and Suspense Grand Prize (2004); Haruhiko Oyabu Award (2012)

Mahokaru Numata (沼田まほかる, Numata Mahokaru; born 1948) is a Japanese crime fiction and horror writer.

There has been an iyamisu (eww mystery) boom in Japan since around 2012. Iyamisu (eww mystery) is a subgenre of mystery fiction which deals with grisly episodes and the dark side of human nature. Readers blurt out "eww" when they are reading iyamisu (eww mystery) novels. Mahokaru Numata, Kanae Minato and Yukiko Mari are regarded as representatives of the genre in Japan.

== Works in English translation ==
- Nan-Core (original title: Yurigokoro), trans. Jonathan Lloyd-Davies (Vertical. 2015. ISBN 978-1939130921)

== Awards and nominations ==
- 2004 – Horror and Suspense Grand Prize: Kugatsu ga Eien ni Tsuzukeba (If September Could Last Forever )
- 2012 – Haruhiko Oyabu Award: Nan-Core
- 2012 – Nominee for Mystery Writers of Japan Award for Best Novel: Nan-Core

== Bibliography ==
=== Novels ===
- Kugatsu ga Eien ni Tsuzukeba (九月が永遠に続けば; lit. If September Could Last Forever), 2005
- Kanojo ga Sono Na o Shiranai Tori-tachi (彼女がその名を知らない鳥たち; lit. The Birds She Doesn't Know the Names Of), 2006
- Nekonari (猫鳴り; lit. Cat Sounds), 2007
- Amida-sama (アミダサマ; lit. Amida Buddha), 2009
- Yurigokoro (ユリゴコロ), 2011 (Nan-Core. Vertical.)

=== Short story collection ===
- Shibireru (痺れる), 2010
