= Kanako Tahara =

Japanese actress and singer (born 1994)

- 田原 可南子
- Born: 14 February 1994 (age 32); Tokyo, Japan
- Other name: Mika Ayano (former stage name)
- Occupations: Gravure idol; actress; singer
- Years active: 2011–
- Agent: Stardust Promotion (until 2018) Trustar (since 2020)
- Style: Fashion; swimsuit
- Height: 157 cm (5 ft 2 in)
- Spouse: Kengo Kora (m. 2024)

Kanako Tahara (田原 可南子, Tahara Kanako; born 14 February 1994, in Tokyo) is a Japanese actress and singer. Her former stage name is Mika Ayano (綾乃 美花, Ayano Mika). Tahara is represented with Trustar. She won the Miss Magazine 2011 Second Grand Prix. Tahara's father is singer Toshihiko Tahara, and her mother is former CanCam model Ayako Mukaida.

== Personal life ==
On 4 October 2024, she announced her marriage to actor Kengo Kora, and also announces her pregnancy of her first child.

== Works ==
=== Singles (internet) ===
Year	Title	Ref.
2012	"I Love"	

=== DVD ===
Year	Title	Ref.
2011	Miss Magazine 2011 Mika Ayano	

== Filmography ==
=== TV dramas ===
Year	Title	Role	Network	Ref.
2011	Motto Atsui zo! Nekoke Tani!!	Sayuri Shirota	NBN	
2013	Samishī Kariudo	Kana Hashiguchi	Fuji TV	
2016	Mars: Tada, Kimi wo Aishiteru!	Hitomi Saito	NTV	
2016	Higanbana: Keishichō Sōsa Nana-ka	Mizuki Miyashita	NTV	

=== Films ===
Year	Title	Role
2012	Lesson of the Evil	Mayu Sato

=== Dramas ===
Year	Title	Role
2013	Dolly Canon	Kokone Shishido

=== Advertisements ===
Year	Title	Ref.
2011	Digital Arts "i-Filter"	

=== Music videos ===
Year	Title	Ref.
2016	White Jam "Koi Bana Hanabi"	

=== Magazines ===
Title	Issue
Weekly Young Magazine	18 Jul 2011

=== Internet ===
Title	Link
OCN Today Kyō no Bishōjo Shashin Vol. 53	1
