= Yurigokoro =

- Theatrical release poster
- Directed by: Naoto Kumazawa
- Screenplay by: Naoto Kumazawa
- Based on: Yurigokoro by Mahokaru Numata
- Produced by: Yūji Ishida; Yoichi Arishige
- Starring: Yuriko Yoshitaka; Tori Matsuzaka; Aimi Satsukawa; Nana Seino; Kaya Kiyohara; Tae Kimura; Kenichi Matsuyama
- Cinematography: Keisuke Imamura
- Edited by: Naoto Kumazawa
- Music by: Gorō Yasukawa
- Distributed by: Toei; Nikkatsu
- Release date: September 23, 2017 (Japan)
- Running time: 128 minutes
- Country: Japan
- Language: Japanese

Yurigokoro (Japanese: ユリゴコロ) is a 2017 Japanese drama film directed by Naoto Kumazawa, based on Mahokaru Numata's novel of the same name. It stars Yuriko Yoshitaka, Kenichi Matsuyama and Tori Matsuzaka.

== Plot ==
Ryosuke, a young man whose peaceful life begins to collapse when his father is diagnosed with terminal cancer and his fiancée, Chie, suddenly disappears. While sorting through his father’s belongings, Ryosuke discovers a hidden notebook titled “Yurigokoro”, which contains the disturbing confession of a woman named Misako, who claims she has lived her life as a remorseless killer. As Ryosuke reads the memoir, the film shifts between his present and Misako’s past, revealing how her childhood emptiness and inability to feel emotions led her to murder—until she unexpectedly experiences love with a man named Yosuke, a relationship that brings both hope and tragedy. As the notebook unfolds, Ryosuke realizes that Misako’s story is not fiction but deeply connected to his own family and Chie’s disappearance, pulling him into a dark truth that ties the past and present together in a chilling climax.

== Cast ==
- Yuriko Yoshitaka as Misako
- Kenichi Matsuyama as Yōsuke
- Tori Matsuzaka as Ryōsuke
- Aimi Satsukawa as Mitsuko
- Nana Seino as Chie
- Kaya Kiyohara as young Misako
- Tae Kimura as Hosoya

== Awards ==
Award	Category	Nominee	Result
41st Japan Academy Prize	Best Actress	Yuriko Yoshitaka	Nominated
