= Autofiction (novel) =

Novel by Hitomi Kanehara

- Author: Hitomi Kanehara
- Original title: Ōto fikushon (オートフィクション)
- Translator: David James Karashima
- Language: Japanese
- Genre: Experimental
- Publisher: Japan: Shueisha Inc; United Kingdom: Vintage Books
- Publication date: 2006
- Publication place: Japan
- English publication date: 2007
- Media type: Print (Paperback)
- Pages: 216 p.
- ISBN: 9780099515982
- OCLC: 175283716

Autofiction is a 2006 novel by Japanese author Hitomi Kanehara (金原 ひとみ, Kanehara Hitomi). It is a work of "autobiographical fiction", following the character Rin in reverse chronological order, from age 22 back to age 15. Kanehara recalls some of her previous experiences of living without a home, and various incidents of drug addictions to narrate the plot. The novel was translated into English by David James Karashima.

Through her past sexual experiences, Rin's mind has begun to fracture, causing her profound insecurity regarding the relationships around her. At age 22, she is returning from her honeymoon only to become jealous of the flight attendant serving her husband. When he excuses himself to go to the bathroom, Rin's uncontrollable conscience begins to stir, believing he's gone to have sex with the woman. As the story unfolds, it becomes clear that Rin's past is a complicated one; filled with grand moments of distrust, abusive relationships and substance abuse. As a nihilist, Rin also suffers from severe anxiety, most noticeably concerning sex, because of her traumatic past.

In 2007, Autofiction was a nomination in the Man Asian Literary Prize.
