= Shu Nakajima =

- 中嶋 しゅう
- Born: 18 April 1948; Tokyo, Japan
- Died: 6 July 2017 (aged 69); Tokyo, Japan
- Occupations: Actor; director
- Agent: Come True
- Height: 172 cm (5 ft 8 in)
- Spouse: Machiko Washio (m. 2003–2017)
- Awards: 45th (2010) Kinokuniya Theater Award for Individual (Blue/Orange, Ima wa Naki Henry Moss)
- Website: Official Profile

Shu Nakajima (中嶋 しゅう, Nakajima Shū; 18 April 1948 – 6 July 2017) was a Japanese actor and director.

He was born in Tokyo. He formerly belonged to Gekidan NLT. He was represented with Come True. His wife was actress Machiko Washio.

== Filmography ==
=== Stage ===
Year	Title	Location	Notes	Ref.
1990	Okuni	Kintetsu Theater		
1991	Bingo		T.P.T Performance	
1991	Song Days	Panasonic Globe Theaters		
1992	Piano	Kinokuniya Hall		
1994	Hi no Tori	Nikko Theater		
1996	Ghetto			
1996	Orufeo no Nage		Recitation	
1997	Umi no Futten	Kinokuniya Hall		
1998	Yō-zakari no Onna-tachi	New National Theater, Shin Kobe Oriental Theater		
1998	Amy's View	Parco Theater		
1999	Yukiyakonkon	Kinokuniya Hall		
1999	Kunisada	Saison Theater		
2000	Yokubō to Iuna no Densha	New National Theater		
2001	Bijo de Nokemono	New National Theater		
2002	Oka no Ue no Yeppe	Benissan Pitt		
2003	Nuremberg Saiban	Actor's Theater		
2004	Kamome	Benissan Pitt		
2004	Nire no Kokage no Yokubō	Theater 1010		
2005	Tengoku no Honya	Museum Shrine		
2005	Caucasus no Hakuboku no Wa	Setagaya Public Theater		
2005	Haha Kimottama to sono Kodomo-tachi	New National Theater		
2006	Bakxai	Benissan Pitt		
2007	The Decline and Fall of The Suzaku			
2007	Hiya Kitaru	New National Theater		
2008	Sora no Teigi	Haiyūza		
2008	Baume in Greeyad	Shinjuku Theater Molière		
2008	Kamome	Theater Brava		
2008	Keen	Tennozu Ginga Theater, Hyogo Prefectural Arts Center		
2009	Honō no Hito	Tennozu Ginga Theater		
2009	Akai Shiro Kuroi Suna	Nikko Theater		
2009	Henry VI	New National Theater		
2010	Heiki no aru Fūkei	Actor's Theater		
2010	Blue/Orange	Yawata Mountain Warsall Theater		
2010	Ima wa Naki Henry Moss	Akasaka Red Theater		
2010	Osorubeki Oya-tachi	Tokyo Art Theater Small Hall 2		
2010	Laskolinikov to Sviedrikarov	Yawata Mountain Warsall Theater	Planning, production	
2011	Edit Piaf	Tennozu Ginga Theater		
2011	Honō no Hito	Tennozu Ginga Theater, Kanagawa Arts Theater Hall (KAAT)	Replay	
2012	Jekyll & Hyde	Nikko Theater	As Sir Danvers	
2012	Sen ni Kudake Chiru Sora no Hoshi	Theater Tram		
2012	Hashi kara no Nagame	Theater Bonbon		
2013	Kōritsu-gaku no Susume	New National Theater Small Theater		
2013	Kikyō	Theater Appearance	RunsFirst Produced Performance	
2013	Jeanne	Setagaya Public Theater		
2013	Macbeth	Theater Cocoon		
2014	Bobby Fischer wa Pasadena ni Sunde iru	Theater Appearance		
2014	Honō: Ansandi	Theater Tram		
2015	Kyōjin na omote Ōjō o togu -Mukashi, Bokutachi wa Aishita-	Tokyo Arts Theater Theater West		
2015	Yasōkyoku-shū	Ginga Theater		
2015	Spokane no Hidarite	Theater Tram		
2016	Eternal Chikamatsu	Theater Cocoon, Drama City		
2016	'Tis Pity She's a Whore	New National Theater Middle Theater		
2016	Ima, koko ni aru Buki	Theater Appearance		
2016	Henry IV	New National Theater Middle Theater		
2017	Kōfukuna Shokuba	Setagaya Public Theater		
2017	Honō: Ansandi	Theater Tram		
2017	Other Desert Cities	Tokyo Arts Theater Theater West		

=== Films ===
Year	Title	Role	Ref.
1977	Gokumonjima		
1980	Kagemusha		
1985	Ran		
1990	Dreams	Party companion	
1993	Madadayo		
2001	To End All Wars	Nagatomo	
2008	The Ramen Girl	Merchant 3	
2013	Kujikenaide		
2013	Bye Bye, Marano		
2013	47 Ronin	Horibe Yasubei	
2014	Saigo no Inochi	Ono (homeless)	
2015	The Emperor in August	Hideki Tojo	
2017	Sekigahara	Serubicchi	
2017	Birds Without Names	Kunieda	(final film role)

=== TV dramas ===
Year	Title	Role	Network	Notes
1987	Dokuganryū Masamune		NHK	
1988	Takeda Shingen	Hirate Hirohide	NHK	
1994	Taxi Driver's Mystery Diary 4	Publisher editorial staff	EX	
1994	Tonosama Dūraibō Kakure Tabi		EX	Episode 20
1995	Hachidai Shōgun Yoshimune	Atsumi Hisatada	NHK	
1995	Onihei Hankachō	Ichino no Umanana	CX	6th Series Episode 11
1996	Furuhata Ninzaburō 2nd Season		CX	Episode 7
1996	Shinjuku Love Story Jiken-bo 2		EX	
1996	Keiji Ou!		TX	Episode 12
1998	Setsunai: Tokyo Heart Break		EX	Episode 2
1998	Taxi Driver no Suiri Nisshi 9		EX	
2012	Rich Man, Poor Woman		CX	
2013	Seicho Matsumoto Special: Kao	Kunimitsu Ishii	CX	
2014	Kosuke Kindaichi VS Kogoro Akechi futatabi		CX	
2014	Long Goodbye	Bartender	NHK	
2015	Kaze no Tōge: Ginkan no Fu	Yutoki Kuki	NHK	
2015	Osugi Tantei Jimusho: Utsukushiki Hyōteki-hen		TBS	
2016	Mikaiketsu Jiken		NHK	File.05 "Lockheed Jiken"

== Directorial works ==
=== Stage ===
Title	Performance	Notes
Ubau koto	Cotton Club	
Kakeru koto	Cotton Club	
Myōna koto	Cotton Club	
Kanojo o Fuan ni sa seru Ikutsu ka no koto	Cotton Club	
Kumo wa kitto Mizu ni naru	Conclave	
Laskolinikov to Sviedrikarov	Conclave	
Mizu no Hanashi		Performed at the Matsumoto Civic Art Center
Rōdoku Geki: Ten-kiri Matsu: Yamigatari		Sea-Activity Produce
