= Birds Without Names =

2017 film

- Film poster
- Directed by: Kazuya Shiraishi
- Screenplay by: Taeko Asano
- Story by: Mahokaru Numata
- Starring: Yū Aoi; Sadao Abe; Tori Matsuzaka; Yutaka Takenouchi
- Cinematography: Takahiro Haibara
- Edited by: Hitomi Kato
- Music by: Takashi Ohmama
- Production companies: Pony Canyon; The Klockworx; C&I Entertainment; Quaras; Hikari TV; TV Osaka; Asahi Broadcasting Corporation
- Distributed by: Nikkatsu
- Release dates: 7 September 2017 (TIFF); 28 October 2017 (Japan)
- Running time: 123 minutes
- Country: Japan
- Language: Japanese

Birds Without Names (Japanese: 彼女がその名を知らない鳥たち, Hepburn: Kanojo ga sono na wo shiranai toritachi) is a 2017 Japanese drama film directed by Kazuya Shiraishi. It was screened in the Contemporary World Cinema section at the 2017 Toronto International Film Festival.

== Plot ==
Towako leads an idle life alongside Jinji Sano, in his fifties, a man about fifteen years her senior, whom she despises and belittles at the slightest opportunity. The latter endures her remonstrances without flinching and alone provides for the needs of the household through hard work as a blue-collar worker. Towako takes Makoto Mizushima as her lover, but lives in the painful memory of her relationship with Shun'ichi Kurosaki which ended abruptly eight years earlier. One day she dials Kurosaki's number but hangs up immediately. Following this phone call, a police inspector visits her and tells her that Kurosaki disappeared without a trace five years ago. When Towako catches Jinji spying on her as she walks out of a love hotel with her lover, she begins to suspect that Jinji is responsible for Kurosaki's disappearance.

== Cast ==
- Yū Aoi as Towako Kitahara
- Sadao Abe as Jinji Sano
- Yutaka Takenouchi as Shunichi Kurosaki
- Tori Matsuzaka as Makoto Mizushima
- Eri Murakawa as Kayo Kunieda
- Shu Nakajima as Kunieda

== About the film ==
Birds Without Names is an adaptation of the successful novel of the same name by Mahokaru Numata whose writings often feature manipulative men, brutal women and their toxic relationships. Another adaptation of one of his novels, Yurigokoro (ユリゴコロ?) By Naoto Kumazawa, was released a month earlier in Japan.

The film is set in and around Osaka, the actors speak with a strong Kansai dialect.
