= Snakes and Earrings =

Japanese novel by Hitomi Kanehara

- Cover of Japanese edition
- Author: Hitomi Kanehara
- Original title: 蛇にピアス (Hebi ni piasu)
- Translator: David Karashima
- Language: Japanese
- Genre: Literary fiction
- Publisher: Shueisha (Japan), Dutton (US), Vintage Books (UK)
- Publication date: 2004
- Publication place: Japan
- English publication date: 2005
- Media type: Print
- Pages: 124
- Awards: Akutagawa Prize
- ISBN: 9784087746839

Snakes and Earrings (蛇にピアス, Hebi ni Piasu) is a Japanese novel by Hitomi Kanehara. The story follows Lui, a young woman in Tokyo whose fascination with body modification and sadomasochistic sexual activity drives her to make increasingly dangerous personal choices. First published in 2003 in the literary magazine Shōsetsu Subaru as the winner of the 27th Subaru Literary Prize, the novel was republished in 2004 after winning the 130th Akutagawa Prize.

Though Snakes and Earrings received mixed reviews, popular and academic critics have noted its significance in contemporary Japanese literature, not only for its authentic portrayal of post-bubble Japanese youth culture, but also for the controversial commercialization of its author's personal life. The novel has sold more than a million copies in Japan, has been translated into sixteen languages, and was adapted into a 2008 Yukio Ninagawa film starring Yuriko Yoshitaka.

== Background ==
As an elementary school student in Japan, Hitomi Kanehara lost interest in academic topics and began to skip school in order to socialize with friends. Her father Mizuhito Kanehara, a professor of sociology at Hosei University, brought her along on a year-long research trip to San Francisco, where she occasionally attended an American school. During her stay in the United States, with her father's permission, she began reading stories by Ryū Murakami and Amy Yamada that contained strong violent and sexual themes.

Kanehara returned to Japan and attended middle school, but became anorexic and engaged in self-harm. Against the wishes of her mother Chieko, Kanehara dropped out of her first year of high school, left home, and began to write stories, including Snakes and Earrings, that drew on her own experiences with cutting, suicidal thoughts, body modification, and living with different boyfriends. She has described Snakes and Earrings as the story she "had to write". Her father supported her writing by arranging for her to participate in a fiction workshop for sophomores at his university, and by editing the Snakes and Earrings manuscript before it was submitted for the Akutagawa Prize.

== Plot summary ==
A young woman named Lui admires her new boyfriend Ama's split tongue, which she likens to the forked tongue of a snake. Having experimented with large ear piercings, she decides that she wants to try the same body modification as Ama. Lui and Ama visit Shiba, a body modification and tattoo artist, who begins the process of inserting progressively larger tongue studs. Lui finds herself interested in Shiba, returns to the shop without Ama, and secretly begins a violent sexual relationship with Shiba involving bondage and sadomasochism.

While walking to a train station one night, Lui, Ama, and Lui's friend Maki are confronted in Shinjuku by two apparent gangsters, one of whom grabs Lui's breast while insulting her. Ama punches both men. After one of the men flees, Ama continues to beat Lui's attacker, using the heavy rings on his hand to knock out the gangster's teeth. Ama gives the teeth to Lui as a symbol of his love for her. Despite Ama's obvious affection, Lui feels disconnected from Ama and continues to have a sexual relationship with Shiba, who is creating an intricate tattoo that covers her entire back. Lui later sees a television news story about a gangster who was beaten to death in Shinjuku, and makes Ama change his appearance to avoid recognition by the police.

One day Ama unexpectedly disappears. His corpse is found with evidence of sexual torture, rape, and strangulation. After learning of Ama's demise, Lui tries to speed up the process of splitting her tongue by inserting larger studs too quickly, causing intense pain, and she stops eating, instead only drinking alcohol. She then discovers evidence suggesting that Shiba was Ama's rapist and murderer. Lui suspects a previous sexual relationship between Shiba and Ama, but when the police investigator asks her whether Ama was bisexual, she insists that he was not. With Ama gone, Shiba completes Lui's tattoo, Lui and Shiba's relationship falls into a more domestic pattern, and Lui considers putting in a larger tongue stud.

== Major themes ==
Academic analysis of Snakes and Earrings outside of Japan has focused on themes of subcultural resistance, gender roles, and commodification. Mark Driscoll, writing in Cultural Critique, argued that while the book's graphic descriptions of tattooing, self-harm, and violent sexual activities revealed subcultures unfamiliar to many readers, Kanehara's portrayal of her characters as "consumerist, closed-off, and unwilling or unable to communicate with people outside their tribe" reinforced popular stereotypes about Japanese youth, particularly the part-time workers called freeters. David Holloway, writing in Japanese Language and Literature, came to a similar conclusion, noting that despite the depiction of Lui as a fringe character rejecting society's rules, she ends up assuming a domestic role consistent with expectations of Japanese women in mainstream society.

In Japan Forum, Rachel DiNitto argued that expecting the subcultural elements of the book to express resistance to mainstream Japanese culture actually reflected a Western literary bias. Instead, she proposed that Kanehara's novel expresses resistance through Lui's experience of her own physical body in a society emphasizing commodification and virtuality. Both DiNitto and Holloway have also suggested that Snakes and Earrings resembles works of Japanese literature published in the years immediately following World War II, such as Tamura Taijiro's Gate of Flesh, in which characters regain control over their own bodies after coercion and defeat, then use their bodies as sites of protest.

Japanese scholars have also highlighted the position of Snakes and Earrings within broader Japanese literary trends. Pointing specifically to Lui's personal experience of pain as a way to mediate between self and society, Japanese sociologist and poet Kiriu Minashita suggests that the novel is part of an early 21st-century Japanese literary trend in which authors focus on women's experiences as worthy subjects in their own right, rather than defining those experiences in terms of relationships with men. Literary scholar Eisuke Kotani has further observed that Snakes and Earrings is a prominent example of a trend also seen in works by Motoko Arai and Risa Wataya, in which a character's first-person real-time narration of personal experience in everyday language, similar to a narrative style usually encountered in anime and manga, leads the reader to imagine that the main character is actually the author.

== Publication and reception ==
=== Japanese publication ===
Snakes and Earrings won the 27th Subaru Literary Prize (すばる文学賞, Subaru Bungakushō) for unpublished stories in 2003. The story was published for the first time in the November 2003 issue of the literary magazine Shōsetsu Subaru. In January 2004, Snakes and Earrings won the 130th Akutagawa Prize. While Snakes and Earrings was the overall favorite of the Akutagawa Prize committee, the award was shared with Risa Wataya for her story Keritai Senaka, making the 20-year old Kanehara and the 19-year old Wataya the youngest winners in the prize's history. Akutagawa Prize committee member Ryū Murakami particularly praised the "radical depiction of our time" in the winning works.

Kanehara appeared at the Akutagawa Prize announcement ceremony wearing "an off-the-shoulder, cut jersey shirt with exposed bra straps, a flared mini skirt, stiletto heels, mid-thigh nylons, multiple earrings and grey-tinted contact lenses". Press accounts of the event contrasted Kanehara's youthful, street-style image with the image of the "demure and old-fashioned" Wataya. Interviews and photos of the winning authors appeared not only in national newspapers, but also in Japanese editions of GQ and Cosmopolitan as well as Weekly Playboy. Kanehara's interviews often discussed troubles in her personal life, such as thoughts of suicide and self-harm, reinforcing the public perception of Kanehara as an authentic narrator of Japanese youth culture.

Kanehara's image, and in particular what Rachel DiNitto has called the "unprecedented commercialization" of that image, raised questions about her novel's literary merits. Critics claimed that Snakes and Earrings was chosen for its marketing value to younger audiences, and that its selection was evidence of declining literary standards, but much of the criticism focused on Kanehara rather than on the novel. In an English-language review of both Akutagawa Prize winning novels, Janet Ashby of The Japan Times criticized the "element of sexism" in the media hype over the two novelists, but also observed that both stories were "somewhat of a letdown", with Snakes and Earrings having a "particularly unsatisfactory ending".

After winning the Akutagawa Prize, Snakes and Earrings was republished alongside Wataya's winning story in the literary magazine Bungei Shunjū. The story was also republished in book form by Shueisha. Within three months of the prize announcement, the Bungei Shunjū issue containing the prize-winning stories had sold over 1.1 million copies, doubling the magazine's usual sales, and the book edition of Snakes and Earrings had sold over 500,000 copies. Contemporary coverage noted that many middle-aged men bought Kanehara's work, but preferred the magazine edition to the book edition, as the book cover was designed to appeal to women readers. The unusual sales numbers and media spectacle surrounding the book drew international attention, including a profile in The New York Times that called the novel "a powerful portrait of this post-bubble generation".

=== English translation ===
Shortly after the Japanese book was published, Dutton acquired the English translation rights. In 2005 an English version of Snakes and Earrings, translated by David Karashima, was published by Dutton in the United States and Vintage Books in the United Kingdom. It received generally positive reviews. Kirkus Reviews called the book "fascinating and unnerving", Marie Claire called it "riveting", and The Village Voice called it "a gnarly blast of Tokyo nihilism". Writing for The Guardian, Maya Jaggi praised the book as "a debut novel about alienation that is shocking but not sensational" and observed that it "offers more than sociological interest".

Reviews of the English translation also noted the broader significance of Snakes and Earrings in contemporary Japanese literature. Writing in the Financial Times, Andrew Lee praised Kanehara for describing Tokyo youth culture with "simple, visceral eloquence", and cited Snakes and Earrings as an exemplar of a literary trend elevating high school girls to the iconic status of geisha in Japanese culture. In The Independent, former Japan Times editor Victoria James grouped the novel with similarly explicit work by Ami Sakurai and Mari Akasaka, lauding the book's quality but expressing skepticism about any long-term mainstream impact of novels by young women about sex.

Criticism of the English translation of Snakes and Earrings concerned its length and ending. While praising Kanehara's detailed descriptions and character development, Prudence Peiffer's review in Library Journal found the book's "hasty conclusion" predictable. Writing for Artforum, Christine Thomas similarly praised Kanehara's "keen observation of everyday reality", but noted that the ending was strained by its efforts to find redemption for the main character. Karen Karbo of Entertainment Weekly compared Snakes and Earrings to the Bret Easton Ellis novel Less than Zero, calling the ending "both chilling and oddly moving" but questioning the book's originality.

== Film adaptation ==
Promotional poster for Japanese theatrical release

=== Production ===
A film adaptation of Snakes and Earrings, directed by Yukio Ninagawa and starring Yuriko Yoshitaka, Kengo Kora, and Arata Iura, started principal photography in November 2007. Ninagawa changed the location of the story to Shibuya from its original Shinjuku in order to film a panoramic opening scene at Shibuya Crossing that he claimed was inspired by the Werner Herzog film Fitzcarraldo. He selected Yoshitaka for the lead role after an audition in which she was required to perform in the nude.

While the film was in production, Yoshitaka was involved in a serious car accident and spent several days in intensive care before returning to the set. She later claimed that the experience helped her to understand her character's pain. Most of the tattoos and piercings in the film, including Lui's tongue piercing, were achieved through makeup and computer-generated effects. Kanehara wrote original lyrics for the film's theme song, which was performed by Chara.

=== Release and reception ===
The R-15 film was released in Japan in September 2008. It ranked 15th at the box office in its opening weekend with approximately US$100,000 in gross receipts, and eventually grossed approximately US$510,000 in domestic theatrical release. Yoshitaka received a Best Newcomer Award at the 32nd Japan Academy Prize ceremony for her performance, as well as a Best Newcomer Prize at the 51st Blue Ribbon Awards and a Best Newcomer prize at the Japanese Movie Critics Awards.

The film was also shown internationally at film festivals, including the 2008 Pusan Film Festival and the 2009 New York Asian Film Festival. Writing for Variety, Russell Edwards panned the film, leveling criticism at weak directing and the performances of the male leads, while calling Yoshitaka an "alluring actress" who nevertheless "lacks the chops to carry the role". Charles Webb, writing for Screen Anarchy, also gave the film a negative review, calling it "the worst kind of art film that is unable to stimulate given its vacuous characters and inane situations".

== Translations ==
- 뱀에게피어싱 (in Korean). Translated by Chong Yu-Ri. Munhak Tongne. 2004. ISBN 9788982818547.
- Serpientes y piercings (in Spanish). Translated by Makiko Tsujimoto. Emecé Editores. 2005. ISBN 9788495908353.
- Serpenti e piercing (in Italian). Translated by Alessandro Clementi. Fazi. 2005. ISBN 9788881126200.
- Snakes and Earrings. Translated by David Karashima. Dutton. 2005. ISBN 9780525948896.
- 蛇信舆舌環 (in Chinese). Translated by Xiao Shimei. Jiānduān chūbǎn gǔfèn yǒuxiàn gōngsī. 2005. ISBN 9789571029696.
- Serps i pírcings (in Catalan). Translated by Albert Mas-Griera. Columna. 2005. ISBN 9788466406512.
- Slanger & piercinger (in Danish). Translated by Sara Koch. Hr. Ferdinand. 2006. ISBN 9788791746130.
- Hadi a náušnice (in Czech). Translated by Jan Levora. Argo. 2006. ISBN 9788072037902.
- Slangen & piercings (in Dutch). Translated by Paul Wijsman. Prometheus. 2006. ISBN 9789044607567.
- Tokyo love (in German). Translated by Sabine Mangold. List. 2006. ISBN 9783471795385.
- Η γλώσσα του φιδιού (in Greek). Translated by Giannis Spandonis. Oceanida. 2006. ISBN 9789604104147.
- Języki i kolczyki (in Polish). Translated by Witold Nowakowski. Albatros A. Kuryłowicz. 2007. ISBN 9788373593350.
- Pirszinget a kígyónak (in Hungarian). Translated by Mónika Nagy. Magvető. 2007. ISBN 9789631425567.
- Cobras e piercings (in Polish). Translated by Jefferson José Teixeira. Geração. 2007. ISBN 9788560302123.
- Ormar och piercing (in Swedish). Translated by Helen Enoksson. Modernista. 2009. ISBN 9789186021412.
- Rắn và khuyên lưỡi (in Vietnamese). Translated by Uyên Thiểm. Văn học. 2009. OCLC 311931761.
