= Machiko Washio =

Japanese actress (born 1949)

- 鷲尾 真知子
- Born: June 2, 1949 (age 77); Kanagawa Prefecture, Japan
- Occupations: Actress; voice actress
- Years active: 1966–present
- Spouse: Shu Nakajima

Machiko Washio (鷲尾 真知子, Washio Machiko; born June 2, 1949) is a Japanese actress who works in both live action as well as voice over work for anime. She is known as the voice of Sakura in Urusei Yatsura.

== Filmography ==
=== Live action films ===
- The Red Spectacles (1987) (Midori Washio)
- The Black House (1999) (Dr. Hatano)
- All About Lily Chou-Chou (2001)
- Oh! Oku (2006) (Kuzuoka)
- Adrift in Tokyo (2007)
- Hot Road (2014)
- Ora, Ora Be Goin' Alone (2020)
- Shikake-nin Fujieda Baian (2023) (Odai)

=== Animated films ===
- Urusei Yatsura: Only You (1983) (Sakura)
- Urusei Yatsura 2: Beautiful Dreamer (1984) (Sakura)
- Castle in the Sky (1986) (Okami)
- Urusei Yatsura: The Final Chapter (1988) (Sakura)
- My Neighbor Totoro (1988) (Elementary school teacher)
- Maroko (1990) (Tamiko Yomota)

=== TV drama ===
- Hissastu Hashikakenin (1985)
- Dokuganryū Masamune (1987) (Ochako)
- Aoi Tokugawa Sandai (2000) (Kakubei)
- Ōoku (2003–05) (Kuzuoka)
- Burning Flower (2015) (Ushio)
- Come Come Everybody (2021) (Hisa Tachibana)
- The Tiger and Her Wings (2024) (Tsune Ōba)

=== Anime television series and OVA ===
- Urusei Yatsura (1981–86) (Sakura)
- Gosenzo-sama Banbanzai! (1989–90) (Tamiko Yomota)
