= Gosenzo-sama Banbanzai! =

1990 film by Mamoru Oshii

- All episode VHS covers

御先祖様万々歳！
- Created by: Mamoru Oshii
- Original video animation
- Directed by: Mamoru Oshii
- Produced by: Hiroshi Umezaki
- Written by: Mamoru Oshii
- Music by: Kenji Kawai
- Studio: Studio Pierrot
- Released: August 5, 1989 – January 25, 1990
- Runtime: 30 minutes per episode
- Episodes: 6
- Anime film

MAROKO
- Directed by: Mamoru Oshii
- Produced by: Hiroshi Umezaki
- Written by: Mamoru Oshii
- Music by: Kenji Kawai
- Studio: Studio Pierrot
- Released: March 31, 1990
- Runtime: 90 minutes

Gosenzo-sama Banbanzai! (御先祖様万々歳！; lit. 'Long Long Live the Ancestors!') is a 1989 Japanese comedy drama science fiction OVA created, directed and written by Mamoru Oshii and produced by Studio Pierrot, made in commemoration of the studio's 10th anniversary. A compilation film consisting of footage from the episodes entitled MAROKO (麿子, MAROKO), also directed by Oshii, was released in 1990.

== Plot ==
The story revolves around a small, normal family known as the Yomota family: A boy named Inumaru, his father Kinekuni and his mother Tamiko. One day, a beautiful girl with a yellow flower hat at their front door, calling herself "Maroko Yomota," granddaughter of Inumaru who travels back in time with a time machine to visit her ancestors. Despite Tamiko's strong refusal to acknowledge her as a Yomota, Kinekuni and Inumaru welcome her to stay with them, and the structure of a happy family has begun to collapse.

The episodes are told in the form of a play.

== Cast and characters ==
Inumaru Yomota (四方田犬丸, Yomota Inumaru)
Voiced by: Toshio Furukawa
A teenage boy who dreams of being with a beautiful girl. He immediately falls in love with Maroko when he meets her, despite her being his future granddaughter.
Maroko Yomota (四方田麿子, Yomota Maroko)
Voiced by: Masako Katsuki
Inumaru's granddaughter from the future. The other Yomota's have a hard time accepting this, to the point where Tamiko leaves Inumaru and Kinekuni.
Kinekuni Yomota (四方田甲子国, Yomota Kinekuni)
Voiced by: Kenichi Ogata
Inumaru's lazy father. He tends to get on his son's nerves with his lazy attitude.
Tamiko Yomota (四方田多美子, Yomota Tamiko) / Tamiko Hakkoda (八甲田多美子, Hakkoda Tamiko)
Voiced by: Machiko Washio
Inumaru's grumpy mother. She always nags and is the first to object to believing that Mariko is from the future. She eventually decides to leave the household, as the news is too much for her to bear.
Bunmei Miroto (室戸文明, Miroto Bunmei) / Inumaro Yomota (四方田犬麿, Yomota Inumaro)
Voiced by: Tesshō Genda
A man sent by the Agency of Time Administration to arrest Maroko for breaking one of the many laws of time travel. He is actually the son of Inumaru and Maroko.
Bannai Tatara (多々良伴内, Tatara Bannai)
Voiced by: Kōichi Yamadera
A man that Tamiko teamed up with in order to find out more about Mariko and save the Yomota family from destruction.
Narration (ナレーション, Narēshon)
Voiced by: Ichirō Nagai
The narrator who often talks about birds at the beginning of each episode.

== Theme songs ==
- Opening
1. "Genzo-sama Banbanzai!" (御先祖様万々歳！, Gosenzo-sama Banbanzai!; lit. 'Long Long Live the Ancestors!')
  - August 5, 1989 - December 17, 1989
  - Lyricist: Yumi Kojima / Composer: Kenji Kawai / Arranger: Kenji Kawai / Singers: Yumi Kojima
  - Episodes: 1-5
- Insert songs
1. "The Watchdog of Time" (時の番犬, Toki no Banken)
  - November 10, 1989
  - Lyricist: Yumi Kojima / Composer: Kenji Kawai / Arranger: Kenji Kawai / Singers: Tesshō Genda
  - Episode: 4
2. "Detective Agencies do not Believe in Love" (興信所は愛を信じない, Kō Shinjo wa Ai o Shinjinai)
  - December 17, 1989
  - Lyricist: Yumi Kojima / Composer: Kenji Kawai / Arranger: Kenji Kawai / Singers: Kōichi Yamadera, Machiko Washio
  - Episode: 5
3. "Streetside Eating Song" (立ち食いの唄, Tachi Gui no Uta)
  - January 25, 1990
  - Lyricist: Yumi Kojima / Composer: Kenji Kawai / Arranger: Kenji Kawai / Singers: Toshio Furukawa
  - Episode: 6

== Episodes ==
No.	Title	Original air date
1	"An Evil Woman Breaks in" Transliteration: "Akufu Ie o Yaburu" (Japanese: 悪婦破家)	August 5, 1989
The episode starts off with a brief explanation about the cuckoo and its lifestyle. The actual story begins with a young girl with a yellow flower hat making her way to the Yomota family's apartment room with a yellow Kodak blimp flying above her. In the apartment, Inumaru spotted a yellow flower, but thought he was just imagining it. He talks to his father, Kinekuni about it, who ignores Inumaru and continues reading his newspaper. Inumaru then starts to talk about other things, like how he bought a metal bat with all of his money (while indirectly insulting his father) and Kinekuni continues to respond dismissively (what he says and what he's implying). Eventually, Kinekuni loses it, rips the newspaper, and takes out the weapon he bought from the same store – a metal golf driver. Suddenly, in the middle of the two Yomota's conflict, the doorbell rings. Inumaru's grumpy mother, Tamiko, comes out and demands that either Inumaru or Kinekuni check who it is, while fussing over who could visit on a Sunday. Eventually, Inumaru answers the door, and the yellow flower girl introduces herself as Mariko Yomota, Inumaru's Granddaughter. Mariko reveals that she's from the future, and that the time machine she used took the form of the yellow Kodak blimp. The news is so devastating to Tamiko that she leaves the house. The episode ends here.
2	"Sumptuous Feast"; Transliteration: "Shuchi Nikurin" (Japanese: 酒池肉林)	September 10, 1989
The episode begins with a brief explanation about the penguin and its lifestyle. The actual story begins with Bunmei Miroto appearing right next to a cola vending machine. Bunmei takes the cola that a random pedestrian bought, and rides a public bus that stops by. Meanwhile, Inumaru is in the bath, and when he requests that Maroko come in to "scrub his back", his father shows up instead. Some time later, They all have Nabe, and Kinekuni tells the audience about the good and bad of having Maroko with them - and that Inumaru may be his rival. Bunmei Miroto interrupts the family meal, and tells them that Maroko is under arrest for breaking one of the laws of time travel - using a time machine to go back in time to visit ancestors. Inumaru and Bunmei get in a fight, and Inumaru knocks Bunmei out. The episode ends with Inumaru and Maroko running away together, leaving Kinekuni behind.
3	"Waiting for a Chance to Pounce"; Transliteration: "Koshi Tantan" (Japanese: 虎視眈眈)	October 10, 1989
The Episode begins with a brief explanation about the Euplectes Jacksoni and its lifestyle. The actual story begins with Inumaru and Maroko finishing their baths and leaving. A cameraman working for the "Realistic" Investigation Agency is shown telling Tamiko about what's happened so far, and she is furious at Maroko and Inumaru. Meanwhile, Maroko begins to regret ever travelling back in time, while Inumaru tells her that it's okay. As Inumaru is about to confess to Maroko, Inumaru shows up and puts Inumaru in a tight spot. The episode ends here, on a cliffhanger.
4	"Starting All Over"; Transliteration: "Kendo Chōrai" (Japanese: 捲土重来)	November 10, 1989
The episode starts off with an explanation of the ostrich's life style. The real story begins with Bannai, Tamiko and Kinekuni heading to the beach, and with Bunmei singing a song and playing the piano. They all meet up by coincidence, and Tmaiko tells everyone that while she was away, she, along with Bannai, had been gathering information on Maroko. Bannai says that the whole time, Maroko and Bunmei have been doing all sorts of time-twisting events to bring down the Yomota family. Everyone (except Kinekuni) gets a chance to throw in some input about the information, but when word gets out that Kinekuni has unpain debts and his current location is exposed, everyone has no choice but to run for it.
5	"Shared Destiny"; Transliteration: "Ichiren Takushō" (Japanese: 一蓮托生)	December 10, 1989
The episode starts off with an explanation of the rhinoceros hornbill. The real story begins with Inumaru, Maroko, Tamiko, Bannai and Kinekuni (who had apparently been stuffed in the trunk of the car) fleeing a store after being caught shoplifting. They all take shelter at an abandoned coffee shop, and Kinekuni rambles on in regret how every day, they do nothing but shoplife, pickpocket, eat without paying and that it all was his own fault. Before then, Kinekuni preferred being with his own family instead of being turned in. Tamiko explains that despite all that's happened because of Mariko, that Mariko is still part of their family. Bunmei appears, and explains to the "audience" how he will ultimately be the end of the family drama. He appears in the coffee shop, and demands the Yomota family turn themselves in - their now completely surrounded by police cars. Bunmei says there is one way to prevent their family from living a life of misery - Kinekuni must kill them off. Before he can shoot his family, Inumaru distracts Kinekuni by pointing to the ceiling and saying "Look, a UFO!", and everyone knocks him out. Kinekuni fires a gunshot upwards, causing a giant stage light to fall from the ceiling and onto Inumaru, Tamiko and Bannai. The only ones conscious now are Maroko and Bunmei. Now is when Bunmei's true identity is revealed - Inumaro Yomota, son of Inumaru and Maroko. He then proceeds to shoot himself, after shouting "Gosenzo-sama Banbanzai!" (Long Long Live the Ancestors!).
6	"Dreaming of a Butterfly"; Transliteration: "Kochō no Yume" (Japanese: 胡蝶之夢)	January 25, 1990
The episode begins with Inumaru dreaming of running in a crop field. He comes across a family resembling his own, and the father hitting him with a metal golf driver. Inumaru wakes up and the train he was riding in stops at Oyashirazu. Inumaru stops at a streetside soba noodle restaurant and talks to the man selling the soba about what has happened so far. He talks about how thanks to Maroko meeting up with the Yomota family, they nothing but trouble after trouble out of it. Inumaru then says that Maroko left, his father went crazy and his whereabouts are unknown, his mother began living with Bannai but is now serving an extortion case, and that he's been wandering from soba stand to soba stand, still looking for Maroko. Inumaru wakes up in a truck - the last moment turned out to be another dream. The man driving the truck asks Inumaru if he really wants to stop in the middle of the road - their current location - and he says he's sure. Inumaru leaves the road and follows a snow path back to the Yomota's former apartment in Tokyo, and comes across the Kodak blimp - the time machine that Maroko used to travel back in time to visit him, his mother and his father. He continues chasing the blimp, and grows more and more weary and tired by each passing minute. He is eventually too tired to walk, or even stand, and collapses in the middle of the snow. A yellow butterfly flies in front of him, but quickly leaves. The last thing he utters before the final episode ends is "Ma...ro...ko...".

== Soundtrack ==
Gosenzo-sama Banbanzai! Original Soundtrack

Compilation album by Kenji Kawai
- Released: August 21, 1993
- Recorded: 1989–1990
- Genre: soundtrack
- Length: 48:56
- Label: EMOTION
- Producers: Kenji Kawai, Tesshō Genda, Kōichi Yamadera, Machiko Washio, Toshio Furukawa

The Gosenzo-sama Banbanzai! Original Soundtrack (御先祖様万々歳！オリジナル・サウンドトラック, Gosenzo-sama Banbanzai! Orijinaru Saundotorakku; lit. 'Long Long Live the Ancestors! Original Soundtrack') CD was released on August 21, 1993.

No.	Title	Lyrics	Music	Length
1.	"親無し鳥"		Kenji Kawai	0:29
2.	"主題歌「御先祖様万々歳！」"	Yumi Kojima	Kenji Kawai	4:22
3.	"埋立地の悪夢"		Kenji Kawai	2:54
4.	"多美子変容"		Kenji Kawai	0:36
5.	"出奔のテーマ－「悪婦破家」より"		Kenji Kawai	3:21
6.	"肉弾戦"		Kenji Kawai	0:44
7.	"駆け落ちのテーマ－「酒池肉林」より"		Kenji Kawai	2:17
8.	"あゝ神田川"		Kenji Kawai	0:41
9.	"果てしなき写実－大日本写実探偵社のテーマ"		Kenji Kawai	2:15
10.	"恫喝のテーマ－「虎視眈々」より"		Kenji Kawai	1:54
11.	"不純血縁交遊"		Kenji Kawai	1:55
12.	"劇中歌「時の番犬」" (Sung by Tessho Genda)	Yumi Kojima	Kenji Kawai	2:51
13.	"家族の記憶/大洗海水浴場にて"		Kenji Kawai	1:59
14.	"一族再会のテーマ－「捲土重来」より"		Kenji Kawai	1:39
15.	"劇中歌「興信所は愛を信じない」" (Sung by Kōichi Yamadera and Machiko Washio)	Yumi Kojima	Kenji Kawai	2:54
16.	"黄色い飛行船"		Kenji Kawai	0:56
17.	"一家離散のテーマ－一蓮托生」より"		Kenji Kawai	2:59
18.	"劇中歌「立喰いの唄」" (Sung by Toshio Furukawa)	Yumi Kojima	Kenji Kawai	3:11
19.	"麿子追想I"		Kenji Kawai	2:05
20.	"麿子追想II"		Kenji Kawai	0:29
21.	"道行のテーマ－「胡蝶の夢」より"		Kenji Kawai	4:52
Total length:				48:56

== DVD releases ==
DVD Name	Content	Release Date
御先祖様万々歳！コンプリートボックス	Episodes 1–6	November 3, 2000
MAROKO 麿子	Movie	November 2, 2001
御先祖様万々歳！VOL．1	Episodes 1–2	December 7, 2001
御先祖様万々歳！VOL．2	Episodes 3–4	December 7, 2001
御先祖様万々歳！VOL．3	Episodes 5–6	December 7, 2001
