= Kengo Kora =

Japanese actor

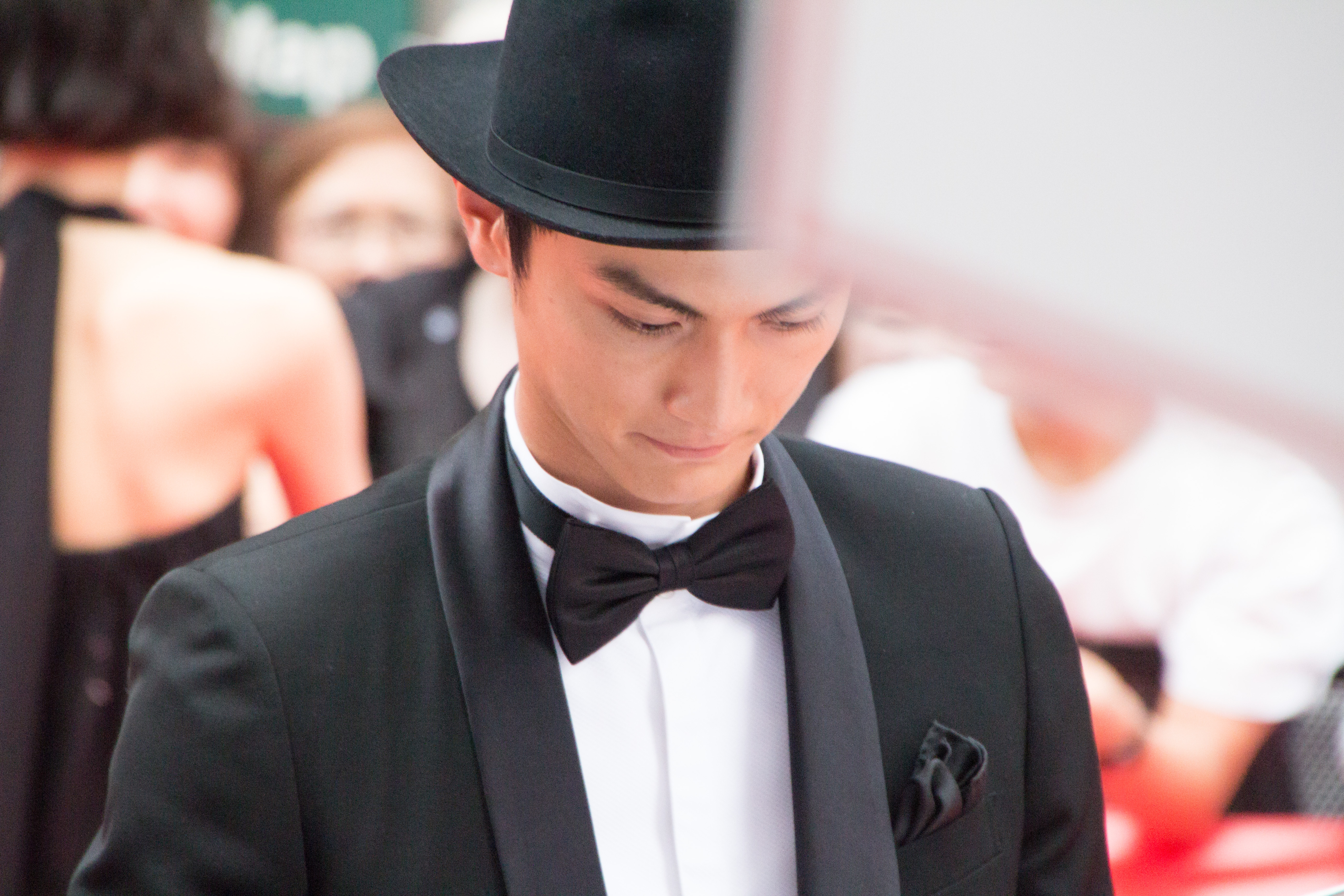
- Kora in 2016
- Born: Kumamoto, Kumamoto, Japan
- Occupation: Actor
- Years active: 2005 - present
- Agent: Ten Carat
- Spouse: Kanako Tahara (m. 2024)

Kengo Kora (高良 健吾, Kōra Kengo) is a Japanese actor.

== Career ==
Kora has gained recognition for his roles in films such as Shinji Aoyama's Sad Vacation, Yukio Ninagawa's Snakes and Earrings, Tran Anh Hung's Norwegian Wood, Ryuichi Hiroki's The Egoists, Yoshihiro Fukagawa's Into the White Night, and Koji Wakamatsu's The Millennial Rapture.

== Personal life ==
On October 4, 2024, Kora announced his marriage to actress Kanako Tahara.

== Filmography ==
=== Film ===
Year	Title	Role	Notes	Ref.
2006	The Inugamis	Young Sahei Inugami	Uncredited	
2006	Metro ni Notte			
2006	The Summer of Stickleback	Sho Sugimoto		
2007	M	Minoru		
2007	Sad Vacation	Yusuke Mamiya		
2007	Fuckin' Runaway	Takeshi		
2008	Snakes and Earrings	Ama		
2008	108	Junpei Sasaki		
2009	Antarctic Chef			
2009	The Crab Cannery Ship			
2009	The Vulture			
2009	Fish Story	Goro		
2009	Zen	Shunryo		
2010	Norwegian Wood	Kizuki		
2010	The Lightning Tree	Tomozo		
2010	Fireworks from the Heart	Taro Suto	Lead role	
2010	Box!	Yūki		
2010	A Crowd of Three		Lead role	
2010	Solanin	Naruo Taneda	Lead role	
2010	Bandage	Yukiya		
2011	The Egoists	Kazuhiko Ninomiya	Lead role	
2011	Tada's Do-It-All House	Hoshi		
2011	Into the White Night	Ryoji Kirihara	Lead role	
2011	The Woodsman and the Rain	Kōichi		
2012	Signal	Reiji Urushida		
2012	Kueki Ressha	Shoji Kusakabe		
2012	Kitsutsuki to Ame	Koichi Kishi		
2012	The Millennial Rapture	Hanzō	Lead role	
2013	The Story of Yonosuke	Yonosuke Yokomichi	Lead role	
2013	A Tale of Samurai Cooking	Yasunobu Funaki		
2013	Roommate	Kensuke Kudo		
2013	Beyond the Memories	Kazue Haruta		
2013	The Tale of the Princess Kaguya	Sutemaru (voice)		
2014	My Man	Ozaki		
2015	The Mourner	Shizuto Sakatsuki	Lead role	
2015	Miss Hokusai	Kuninao Utagawa (voice)		
2015	Being Good	Tadashi Okano	Lead role	
2016	Utsukushii Hito	Tamaya		
2016	Kako: My Sullen Past	Yasunori		
2016	Bitter Honey	Ryūnosuke Akutagawa		
2016	Shin Godzilla	Yusuke Shimura		
2017	Moon and Lightning	Satoshi	Lead role	
2017	Side Job	Miura		
2018	Shoplifters	Takumi Maezono		
2018	Natsume's Book of Friends Movie	Mukuo Tsumura (voice)		
2018	Dare to Stop Us	Ken Yoshizawa		
2019	Love's Twisting Path	Tajūrō	Lead role	
2019	Talking the Pictures	Takayuki Mogi		
2019	No Longer Human	Yukio Mishima		
2019	The Master of Funerals	Daisuke Toyokawa		
2019	Under Your Bed	Mitsui	Lead role	
2019	Noroshi ga Yobu		Short film	
2020	Town Without Sea	Kobayashi		
2020	Under the Stars			
2021	Aristocrats	Kōichirō Aoki		
2021	Photograph of Memories	Ichirō Hoshino		
2021	Remain in Twilight	Kin'ichi		
2022	The Three Sisters of Tenmasou Inn	Kazuma		
2022	2 Women			
2023	In Her Room			
2023	The Water Flows to the Sea	Shigemichi "Nigemichi" Utagawa		
2023	G-Men	Kaoru Date		
2023	Tokyo Revengers 2: Bloody Halloween Part 1	Shin'ichirō		
2023	Masked Hearts			
2024	Sin and Evil	Haru	Lead role	
2024	Rainy Blue			
2024	The Voices at War	Morio Tateno		
2024	Route 29			
2025	Seaside Serendipity			
2026	silver express			

=== Television ===
Year	Title	Role	Notes	Ref.
2011	Sunshine	Kazunari Maruyama	Asadora	
2012	Crime and Punishment: A Falsified Romance	Miroku Tachi	Lead role	
2015	Burning Flower	Takasugi Shinsaku	Taiga drama	
2016	Love That Makes You Cry	Ren Soda	Lead role	
2016	Beppin san	Kiyoshi Nogami	Asadora	
2017	Moribito: Guardian of the Spirit	Raul		
2018	Bye Bye, Black Bird		Lead role	
2019	Two Homelands	Tadashi Amō	TV movie	
2019	Yume-Shokudō no Ryōrinin		Lead role, TV movie	
2019	Motokare Mania	Makoto "Makochi" Saitō	Lead role	
2021	Reach Beyond the Blue Sky	Shibusawa Kisaku	Taiga drama	
2021	Anata no Soba de Ashita ga Warau		TV movie	
2021	Isoroku Yamamoto in London	Sadatoshi Tomioka	TV movie	
2022	Modern Love Tokyo		Episode 2	
2024	1122: For a Happy Marriage	Shiro Kashiwagi		
2024	House of Ninjas	Gaku Tawara		
2026	Blossom	Kakunosuke Akiyama	Asadora	

=== Music videos ===
Year	Song	Artist	Ref.
2009	Tsumetaiame	Every Little Thing	
2009	Shinseiki no Love Song	Asian Kung-Fu Generation	
2010	Ima, Kimi ni Itteokou	Fumiya Fujii	
2013	Ima o Ikite	Asian Kung-Fu Generation	
2021	Twilight (One Piece Vol.100/Ep.1000 Commemorative Video "We Are One")	Radwimps	

== Awards and nominations ==
Year	Award	Category	Work(s)	Result	Ref.
2010	23rd Nikkan Sports Film Awards	Yūjirō Ishihara Newcomer Award	Fireworks from the Heart and Solanin	Won	
2011	20th Japan Film Professional Awards	Best New Encouragement	A Crowd of Three	Won	
2012	35th Japan Academy Film Prize	Newcomer of the Year	The Egoists	Won	
2012	36th Elan d'or Awards	Newcomer of the Year	Himself	Won	
2013	36th Japan Academy Film Prize	Best Supporting Actor	Kueki Ressha	Nominated	
2014	23rd Japan Film Professional Awards	Best Actor	A Story of Yonosuke	Won	
2014	56th Blue Ribbon Awards	Best Actor	A Story of Yonosuke	Won	
2015	28th Nikkan Sports Film Awards	Best Actor	The Mourner and Being Good	Won	
