= Nao Ōmori =

Japanese actor (born 1972)

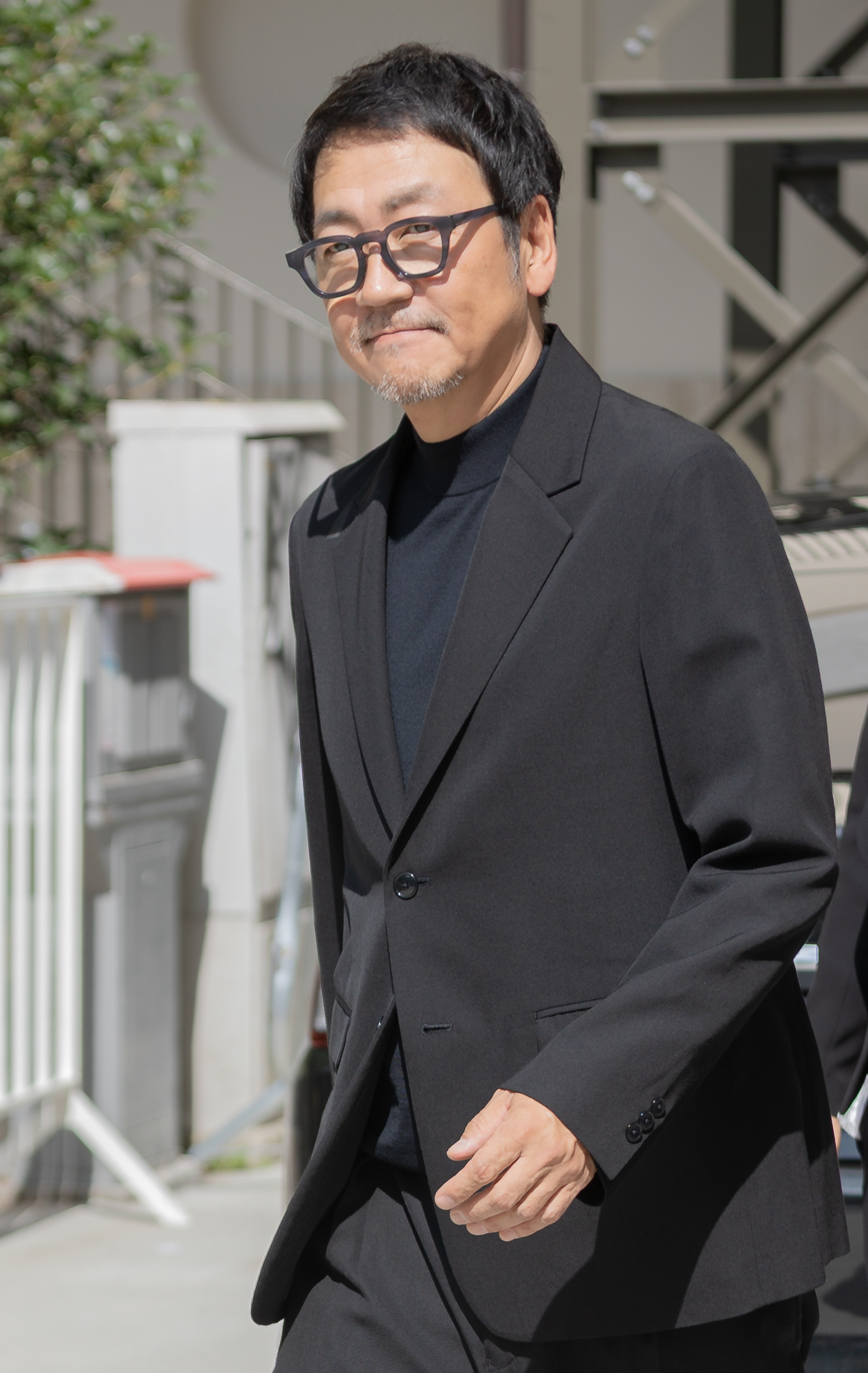
- Ōmori at the 81st Venice International Film Festival in Venice, Italy (2024)
- Born: February 19, 1972 (age 54); Tokyo, Japan
- Occupation: Actor
- Years active: 1997–present
- Father: Akaji Maro
- Relatives: Tatsushi Ōmori (brother)

Nao Ōmori (大森 南朋, Ōmori Nao; born February 19, 1972), sometimes credited as Nao Ohmori or Nao Omori, is a Japanese actor. He was given the Best Supporting Actor award at the 2004 Yokohama Film Festival.

== Career ==
Omori starred in Takashi Miike's Ichi the Killer. He co-starred with Shinobu Terajima in Ryuichi Hiroki's Vibrator.

== Personal life ==
Omori is the son of the actor Akaji Maro and the younger brother of the film director Tatsushi Ōmori.

== Filmography ==
=== Films ===
- The Revenge: A Scar That Never Fades (1997)
- Tenshi ni Misuterareta Yoru (1999), Shop assistant
- Big Show! Hawaii ni Utaeba (1999), Jimmy
- Monday (2000)
- Swing Man (2000)
- Quartet (2001), Daisuke
- Ichi the Killer (2001), Ichi
- Harmful Insect (2001), Man at Love Hotel
- Out (2002), Kenji Yamamoto
- Dolls (2002), Matsumoto's Colleague
- Demonlover (2002), Shoji
- Pakodate-jin (2002)
- Perfect Blue (2002), Toshihiko Horibe
- Saru (2003), Isomura
- Akame 48 Waterfalls (2003)
- Vibrator (2003), Takatoshi
- Hyaku Iro Megane (2003), Man Investigating Kaede
- 1-Ichi (2003), Ichi/Shiroishi
- Iden & Tity (2003), Toshi
- Jam Films 2 (2004), Kuroki Iwao
- Kagen no Tsuki (2004)
- Breathe In, Breathe Out (2004), Yutaka Tadokoro
- Socrates in Love (2004)
- Nonki-na Nesan (2004), Kazuo
- Yaji and Kita: The Midnight Pilgrims (2005), Tortured Samurai
- It's Only Talk (2005)
- Yokubo (2005), Goro Nose
- Rampo Noir (2005), First Lieutenant Sunaga (story "Imomushi")
- A Day Beyond the Horizon (2005)
- The Whispering of the Gods (2005), Ukawa
- Kagi ga Nai (2005)
- Su-ki-da (2005)
- I Just Didn't Do It (2006), Koji Yamada
- Children (2006), Tatsuya Jinnai
- Catch Ball Ya (2006), Takashi Oyama
- Tekkonkinkreet (2006) (voice), Chocola
- Tears for You (2006), Doctor
- The Go Master (2006), Utaro Hashimoto
- Mushishi (2006), Koro
- Otoko wa Sore o Gaman Dekinai (2006), Takashi
- Midnight Eagle (2007), Kensuke Saito
- Missing (2007), Son
- Achilles and the Tortoise (2008)
- Tokyo! (2008)
- Fish Story (2009)
- The Vulture (2009), Masahiko Washizu
- The Laughing Policeman (2009), Kochi Saeki
- Sweet Little Lies (2010)
- Golden Slumber (2010)
- From Up on Poppy Hill (2011) (voice), Akio Kazama
- The Egoists (2011)
- Unfair 2: The Answer (2011)
- Tokyo Playboy Club (2012)
- Helter Skelter (2012)
- The Ravine of Goodbye (2013)
- R100 (2013)
- Parasyte: Part 1 (2014)
- Parasyte: Part 2 (2015)
- Museum (2016)
- Outrage Coda (2017), Ichikawa
- The Outsider (2018), Seizu
- Lying to Mom (2018)
- First Love (2019)
- This Old Road: Kono Michi (2019), Hakushū Kitahara
- Living in the Sky (2020)
- The Great Yokai War: Guardians (2021), Nurarihyon
- And So the Baton Is Passed (2021)
- Goodbye Cruel World (2022)
- Dr. Coto's Clinic 2022 (2022), Takashi Sakano
- Shin Kamen Rider (2023), Spider Augment-01 (voice)
- Kubi (2023), Hashiba Hidenaga
- The Innocent Game (2023), Daigo Numata
- Broken Rage (2024), Detective Fukuda
- Blank Canvas: My So-Called Artist's Journey (2025), Akiko's father
- A Moon in the Ordinary (2025), Eguchi
- One Last Throw (2025), Katsuo Hirata
- Street Kingdom (2026)
- The Hikikomori Extraction (2026)
- Akiramemasen! (2027), Mikio Kirishima

=== Television ===
- Dr. Coto's Clinic (2003–06), Takashi Sakano
- Hagetaka: Road to Rebirth (2007), Masahiko Washizu
- Ryōmaden (2010), Takechi Hanpeita
- Man of Destiny (2012), Kazuo Yamabe
- Dr. Storks (2015), Takayuki Imahashi
- Totto TV (2016), Tadasu Iizawa
- My Housekeeper Nagisa-san (2020), Nagisa-san
- Chimudondon (2022), Kenzō Higa
- What Will You Do, Ieyasu? (2023), Sakai Tadatsugu
- The Big Chase: Tokyo SSBC Files (2025–26), Shuji Igaki
- Since I Took You Away (2025), Asahi Yuki
- Soda Master (2026), Hajime "Chan" Fujimaki

=== Video games ===
- Yakuza 6: The Song of Life (2016), Tsuneo Iwami
