= Hitomi Kanehara =

Japanese novelist

- 金原 ひとみ
- Born: August 8, 1983 (age 43)
- Occupation: Novelist
- Writing career
- Language: Japanese
- Genres: Fiction, short story
- Notable works: Hebi ni piasu (蛇にピアス); Torippu torappu (トリップトラップ); Mazãzu (マザーズ)
- Notable awards: Akutagawa Prize; Oda Sakunosuke Prize; Bunkamura Deux Magots Literary Prize

Hitomi Kanehara (金原 ひとみ, Kanehara Hitomi; born August 8, 1983) is a Japanese novelist. Her novel Hebi ni piasu (Snakes and Earrings) won Subaru Literary Award and the Akutagawa Prize, and sold over a million copies in Japan. Her work has been translated into more than a dozen languages worldwide.

== Early life ==
Kanehara was born in Tokyo, Japan. During elementary school she spent a year in San Francisco with her father. At age 11, she dropped out of school, and at age 15 she left home. After leaving home, Kanehara pursued her passion for writing. Her father, Mizuhito Kanehara, a literary professor and translator of children's literature, continued to support her.

== Career ==
Kanehara wrote her first novel, Hebi ni piasu (Snakes and Earrings), at the age of 21. The novel won the Shōsetsu Subaru Literary Prize and the Akutagawa Prize (judged by novelist Ryū Murakami), and became a Japanese bestseller, going on to sell more than one million copies. Kanehara and fellow 2003 Akutagawa Prize honoree Risa Wataya remain the youngest people ever to receive the Akutagawa Prize. In the same year that she won the Akutagawa Prize, Kanehara got married.

Kanehara's novel Autofiction, with a story that unfolds in reverse chronological order, was published in Japan in 2006. In 2007 an English version of Autofiction, translated by David James Karashima, was published by Vintage Books under the same name, and her novel Haidora (Hydra) appeared in print in Japan. A film adaptation of Hebi ni piasu, directed by Yukio Ninagawa and starring Yuriko Yoshitaka in the lead role, premiered in 2008. Kanehara's novel Torippu torappu (TRIP TRAP) was published in 2009, and won the 2010 Sakunosuke Oda Prize.

When the Fukushima Daiichi nuclear disaster occurred in 2011, Kanehara left Tokyo for Okayama out of concerns about the effects of radiation on her children. In 2012 she moved to France, and her book Mazāzu (Mothers) won the Bunkamura Deux Magots Literary Prize. While living in France with her husband and two daughters, Kanehara wrote several books, including Keihaku (Flirty) in 2016 and Kuraudo gāru (Cloud Girl) in 2017. After living in France for six years, in 2018 she and her family returned to Japan, where her essay collection Pari no Sabaku, Tōkyō no Shinkirō (Paris Desert, Tokyo Mirage), was published in 2020.

== Writing style ==
Kanehara's early work is known for its graphic depictions of sexual activity, violence, body modification, pedophilia, anorexia, bulimia, and self-harm. Kanehara has claimed that her own experiences with self-harm have inspired her fictional settings and characters, and reviews of Hebi ni piasu and Autofiction regularly focused on her own appearance and behavior. A common theme in her work is personal choice, with characters often making choices that place them outside societal norms in order to take control of their own actions and consequences. As Kanehara has explored this theme in her later work in the context of motherhood and family rather than youth and sex, media attention to her work has declined.

== Recognition ==
- 2003 Subaru Literary Prize (Shueisha) for Hebi ni piasu (Snakes and Earrings)
- 2004 130th Akutagawa Prize (2003下) for Hebi ni piasu (Snakes and Earrings)
- 2010 Sakunosuke Oda Prize for Torippu Torappu (Trip Trap)
- 2012 Bunkamura Deux Magots Literary Prize for Mazāzu (Mothers)
- 2020 Watanabe Junichi Literary Prize for Antarakusha (Ataraxia)
- 2021 Tanizaki Jun'ichirō Prize for Ansōsharudisutansu (Unsocial Distance)

== Films and other adaptations ==
- Hebi ni piasu (Snakes and Earrings), 2008

== Bibliography ==
=== Books in Japanese ===
- Hebi ni piasu (Snakes and earrings), Shūeisha, 2004, ISBN 9784087746839
- Ash Baby, Shūeisha, 2004, ISBN 9784087747010
- AMEBIC, Shūeisha, 2005, ISBN 9784087747690
- Autofiction, Shūeisha, 2006, ISBN 9784087753646
- Hydra, Shinchosha, 2007, ISBN 9784103045311
- Hoshi e ochiru, Shūeisha, 2007, ISBN 9784087748970
- Torippu Torappu (Trip Trap), Kadokawa Shoten, 2009, ISBN 9784048740128
- Yūutsutachi, Bungei Shunju, 2009, ISBN 9784163285207
- Mazāzu (Mothers), Shinchōsha, 2011, ISBN 9784103045328
- Marriage Marriage, Shinchōsha, 2012, ISBN 9784103045335
- Motazaru mono (The Have-Nots), Shūeisha, 2015, ISBN 9784087716061
- Keihaku (Flirty) Shinchōsha, 2016, ISBN 9784103045342
- Kuraudo gāru (Cloud Girl), Asahi Shimbun, 2017, ISBN 9784022514448
- Antarakusha (Ataraxia), Shūeisha, 2019, ISBN 9784087711844
- Pari no sabaku, Tōkyō no shinkirō (Parisien Deserts, Tokyo Mirage), 2020, Hōmusha, ISBN 9784834253375
- Fishy, 2020, Asahi Shinbun Shuppan, ISBN 9784022517135
- Ansōsharudisutansu (Unsocial Distance), 2021, Shinchōsha, ISBN 9784103045359
- Mītsu za wārudo (Meets the world), 2022, Shūeisha, ISBN 9784087717778
- Dekurinezon (Déclinaison), 2022, Hōmusha, ISBN 9784834253610
- Hara o sukaseta yūshadomo (The hungry brave), 2023, Kawadeshobō, ISBN 9784309031064
- Hajikete mazare (Burst Open and Mix), 2023, Kōdansha, ISBN 9784065333389
- Nachuraru bōn chikin (Natural Born Chicken) , 2024, Kawadeshobō, ISBN 4309039162

=== Selected work in English ===
- Snakes and Earrings, trans. David James Karashima, Dutton, 2005, ISBN 9780525948896
- Autofiction, trans. David James Karashima, Vintage Books, 2007, ISBN 9780099515982
- "Mambo", trans. Dan Bradley, The Book of Tokyo: A City in Short Fiction, 2015
- "Delira", trans. Dan Bradley, Granta, October 10, 2015
- "Aiguille" and "Pute", trans. Morgan Giles, Granta, November 11, 2020
