= Death of a Japanese Salesman =

- Poster
- Kanji: エンディングノート
- Revised Hepburn: Endingu Nōto
- Directed by: Mami Sunada
- Release date: September 2011 (San Sebastian)
- Running time: 90 minutes
- Country: Japan
- Language: Japanese
- Box office: >¥100 million (Japan)

Death of a Japanese Salesman (Japanese: エンディングノート, Hepburn: Endingu Nōto; lit. "Ending Note") is a 2011 Japanese documentary film written and directed by Mami Sunada about the illness and death of her father, Tomoaki Sunada.

The film was a box office success in Japan, and has won prizes at the Dubai (Muhr Award) and Chicago International Film Festivals, and was described as one of the ten best films of the year by The Japan Times.

== Reception ==
By December 2011, the film had earned over ¥100 million at the Japanese box office.
