= Bozo (film) =

- Theatrical release poster
- Directed by: Tatsushi Ōmori
- Written by: Tatsushi Ōmori; Hidemori Tsuchiya
- Produced by: Takahiko Kondō; Shinichiro Muraoka
- Starring: Shingo Mizusawa; Yasushi Fuchikami; Shohei Uno; Ai Tamura
- Cinematography: Atsuhiko Fukaya
- Edited by: Ryo Hayano
- Music by: Yoshihide Otomo
- Production company: Apache
- Distributed by: Apache
- Release date: March 16, 2013 (Japan)
- Running time: 130 minutes
- Country: Japan
- Language: Japanese

Bozo (Japanese: ぼっちゃん, Hepburn: Botchan) is a 2013 Japanese drama film directed by Tatsushi Ōmori and based on the Akihabara massacre. It was released on 16 March 2013 in Japan.

== Cast ==
- Shingo Mizusawa
- Yasushi Fuchikami
- Shohei Uno
- Ai Tamura

=== Accolades ===
Award	Date	Category	Recipients and nominees	Result
Japan Film Professional Awards	June, 2014	Best Film	Bozo	Won
Japan Film Professional Awards	June, 2014	Best New Male Actor	Shingo Mizusawa	Won
