= Flashback Memories 3D =

- Poster
- Directed by: Tetsuaki Matsue
- Produced by: Junji Takane
- Cinematography: Tomonori Watanabe
- Edited by: Daisuke Imai
- Release dates: October 2012 (Tokyo); January 19, 2013 (Japan)
- Running time: 72 minutes
- Country: Japan
- Language: Japanese

Flashback Memories 3D (フラッシュバックメモリーズ 3D) is a 2012 Japanese 3D music documentary film directed by Tetsuaki Matsue. It was released on 19 January 2013 in Japan.

== Cast ==
- Goma
- Kosuke Tsuji
- Kenta Tajika
- Kyoichi Shiin

== Reception ==
The film was in competition at the 25th Tokyo International Film Festival, in October 2012. It opened the 14th Cinemanila International Film Festival, on 5 December 2012 and also the 1st Helsinki Cine Aasia, on 14 March 2013. It was also shown at the 13th Japanese Film Festival Nippon Connection in June 2013.

Mark Adams, on Screen Daily, said the film was "more art installation than formal feature documentary".

=== Accolades ===
It was chosen as the 5th best film at the 23rd Japan Film Professional Awards, as the 8th best Japanese film of the year by film magazine Eiga Geijutsu and as the 10th best Japanese film of the year by film magazine Kinema Junpo.

Award	Date	Category	Recipients and nominees	Result
Tokyo International Film Festival	October 2012	Audience	Flashback Memories 3D	Won
Japan Film Professional Awards	June 2014	Special	Tetsuaki Matsue	Won
