= Yuriko Yoshitaka =

Japanese actress

- 吉高 由里子
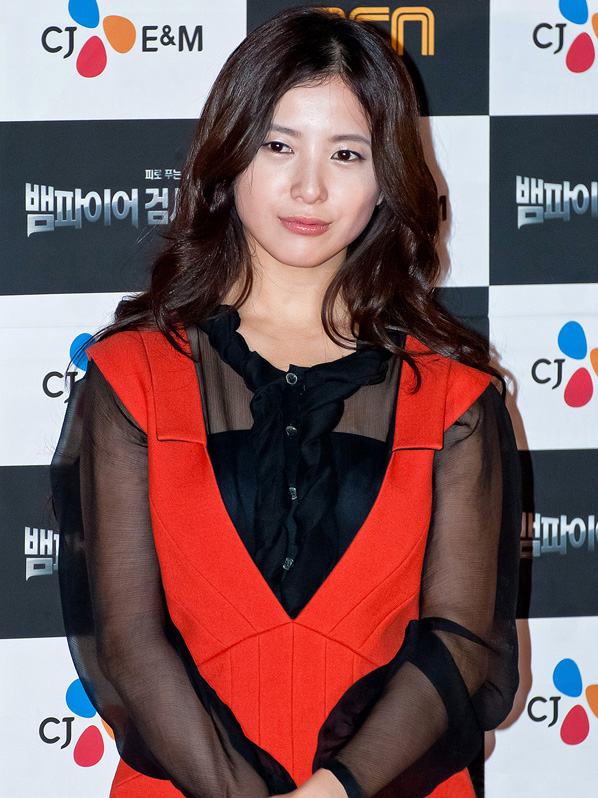
- Yoshitaka in 2012
- Born: July 22, 1988 (age 37); Tokyo, Japan
- Occupation: Actress
- Years active: 2004–present
- Agent: Amuse, Inc.
- Website: www.amuse.co.jp/artist/yoshitaka_yuriko/

Yuriko Yoshitaka (Japanese: 吉高 由里子, Hepburn: Yoshitaka Yuriko; born July 22, 1988) is a Japanese actress. She has played numerous roles in film and television, including lead roles in Snakes and Earrings, Yurigokoro, and the NHK asadora Hanako to Anne.

== Career ==
At age 16, her first year of high school, Yoshitaka joined the entertainment industry when she was scouted by an agency while shopping at Harajuku. Yoshitaka made her acting debut in 2006. She was given the lead role in the live-action adaptation of Hitomi Kanehara's award-winning novel Snakes and Earrings in 2007. Portraying Lui, a teenager whose life goes into a downward spiral after meeting the forked-tongued and tattooed Ama, the role was Yoshitaka's breakthrough role. The Japanese public began to take notice of her, and in a poll conducted by Oricon, Yoshitaka was the fifth promising young actress of 2009 and 2009's freshest female celebrity. In 2010, Oricon again conducted a poll on the most promising actress and she managed climb up to top the poll.

Yoshitaka began to receive more work in 2008 as she appeared in Flow's music video "Arigatō" (ありがとう; "Thanks"), was given her first lead role in the comedy drama Konno-san to Asobo (紺野さんと遊ぼう, Let’s Play with Konno-san) and took up the lead role in the film Yubae Shōjo (夕映え少女, A Girl in the Sunset) before the theatrical release of her other lead film Snakes and Earrings.

In 2009, Yoshitaka was given the role of the suicidal Kairi Hayakawa in the romantic-comedy drama Love Shuffle. Later in the year, she portrayed Yūki Matsunaga (松永 由岐, Matsunaga Yūki) in the police drama Tokyo Dogs with Shun Oguri and Hiro Mizushima as her co-stars.

In 2010, she starred as all three sisters in a short drama series titled Tofu Shimai (豆腐姉妹, lit. Tofu Sisters). It was announced on May 13, 2010 that Yoshitaka was given her first lead role in a network television drama series called Mioka (美丘), portraying a university student with an incurable illness.

She played Tae Kojima in the two-part 2011 live-action adaptation of the sci-fi and action manga Gantz. She also took the lead role in Kōji Maeda's movie Konzen Tokkyū, portraying a young woman dating multiple men in hopes of finding the right one to marry. It premiered in Spring 2011.

From March 31, 2014 to September 27, 2014 she portrayed Hanako Muraoka (1893–1968) in Hanako to Anne (花子とアン, Hanako to An), a Japanese television drama series, the 90th Asadora series broadcast on NHK. She hosted the 65th NHK Kōhaku Uta Gassen on New Year's Eve 2014 alongside Arashi.

== Personal life ==
While she was preparing for her role in Snakes and Earrings, Yoshitaka was involved in a traffic accident in September 2007, and suffered a fractured jaw. She was in the intensive care unit (ICU) for five days as a result.

== Filmography ==
=== TV drama ===
| Year | Title | Role | Notes | Ref |
|---|---|---|---|---|
| 2006 | Jikō Keisatsu | Mayumi | Episode 6 | |
| 2006 | Children | young Miharu | Television film | |
| 2006 | PS Rashōmon | Yukari Sonoda | Episode 2 | |
| 2006 | Ii Onna | Mika Nakamura | | |
| 2007 | Jodan Ja Nai! | | Episode 8 | |
| 2007 | Yonimo Kimyona Monogatari: Countdown | | | |
| 2008 | Ashita no Kita Yoshio | Shinobu Yoimachi | | |
| 2008 | Atsuhime | Otetsu | Taiga drama | |
| 2008 | Konno-san to Asobo | Miyuki Konno | Lead role | |
| 2008 | Average | | | |
| 2008 | Taiyo to Umi no Kyoshitsu | Akari Yashima | | |
| 2008 | Tonsure | Mika Kashiwaba | Lead role | |
| 2008 | Average 2 | | | |
| 2008 | The Naminori Restaurant | Misaki | | |
| 2009 | Love Shuffle | Kairi Hayakawa | | |
| 2009 | True Horror Stories: Chi Nurareta Ryokan | Moe Yasuda | Lead role; short drama | |
| 2009 | Shiroi Haru | Shiori Nishida | | |
| 2009 | Ikemen Shin Sobaya Tantei | Glico | Episode 5 | |
| 2009 | Tokyo Dogs | Yūki Matsunaga | | |
| 2010 | Tofu Shimai | Three sisters: Kinuyo, Momen, Yuriko | Lead role; miniseries | |
| 2010 | Mioka | Mioka Minegishi | Lead role | |
| 2011 | The Reason I can't Find Love | Saki Ogura | Lead role | |
| 2012 | Vampire Prosecutor 2 | Luna | | |
| 2013 | Galileo 2 | Misa Kishitani | | |
| 2014 | Hanako to Anne | Hanako Muraoka | Lead role; Asadora | |
| 2017 | Tokyo Tarareba Girls | Rinko Kamata | Lead role | |
| 2018 | Ms. Justice | Ririko Takemura | Lead role | |
| 2019 | I Will Not Work Overtime, Period | Yui Higashiyama | Lead role | |
| 2020 | Off the Record | Keito Makabe | Lead role | |
| 2020 | The Dangerous Venus | Kaede Yagami | | |
| 2021 | Dearest | Rio Sanada | Lead role | |
| 2022 | Kaze yo Arashi yo | Itō Noe | Lead role; television film | |
| 2023 | On a Starry Night | Suzu Yukimiya | Lead role | |
| 2024 | Dear Radiance | Murasaki Shikibu | Lead role; Taiga drama | |

=== Film ===
| Year | Title | Role | Notes | Ref |
|---|---|---|---|---|
| 2005 | Zoo | "Seven Rooms" Room 7 girl | | |
| 2006 | Noriko's Dinner Table | Yuka Shimbara | | |
| 2007 | Maruyamacho | Seta | | |
| 2007 | Kayokyoku Dayo, Jinsei wa | | | |
| 2007 | Adrift in Tokyo | Fufumi | | |
| 2008 | Yubae Shōjo | | Lead role | |
| 2008 | Cyborg She | Student in the 22nd Century | | |
| 2008 | Your Friends | Hanai Kyōko | | |
| 2008 | Snakes and Earrings | Lui | Lead role | |
| 2009 | Gravity's Clowns | Natsuko | | |
| 2009 | Kaiji 2 | Hiromi Ishida | | |
| 2010 | Subete wa Umi ni Naru | Shizuko | | |
| 2011 | Gantz | Tae Kojima | | |
| 2011 | Gantz: Perfect Answer | Tae Kojima | | |
| 2011 | Cannonball Wedlock | Chie | Lead role | |
| 2012 | Robo-G | Yoko Sasaki | | |
| 2012 | We Were There: First Love | Nanami Takahashi | Lead role | |
| 2012 | We Were There: True Love | Nanami Takahashi | Lead role | |
| 2013 | The Story of Yonosuke | Shoko Yosano | | |
| 2013 | Midsummer's Equation | Misa Kishitani | | |
| 2017 | Yurigokoro | Misako | Lead role | |
| 2018 | Killing for the Prosecution | Saho Tachibana | | |
| 2020 | Your Eyes Tell | Akari Kashiwagi | Lead role | |
| 2024 | Kaze yo Arashi yo | Itō Noe | Lead role | |
| 2026 | The Samurai and the Prisoner | Chiyoho | | |

== Awards and nominations ==
| Year | Organization | Award | Work | Result | Ref(s) |
|---|---|---|---|---|---|
| 2007 | 28th Yokohama Film Festival | Best Newcomer | Noriko's Dinner Table | Won | |
| 2009 | 32nd Japan Academy Film Prize | Best Newcomer | Snakes and Earrings | Won | |
| 2009 | 51st Blue Ribbon Awards | Best Newcomer | Snakes and Earrings | Won | |
| 2009 | 18th Japan Movie Critics Awards | Best New Actress | Snakes and Earrings | Won | |
| 2012 | 36th Elan d'or Awards | Newcomer of the Year | Herself | Won | |
| 2012 | 33rd Yokohama Film Festival | Best Actress | Cannonball Wedlock | Won | |
| 2014 | 68th Mainichi Film Awards | Best Supporting Actress | The Story of Yonosuke | Won | |
| 2018 | 41st Japan Academy Film Prize | Best Actress | Yurigokoro | Nominated | |
| 2022 | 15th Tokyo Drama Awards | Best Actress | Dearest | Won | |
