= Yukio Ninagawa =

Japanese theatre director and actor (1935–2016)

- 蜷川 幸雄
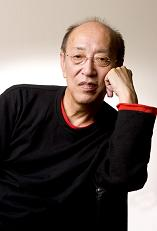
- Born: October 15, 1935; Kawaguchi, Saitama, Japan
- Died: May 12, 2016 (aged 80); Tokyo, Japan
- Occupations: Theatre director, film director, actor
- Years active: 1969–2016
- Spouse: Tomoko Mayama
- Family: Mika Ninagawa (daughter); Toshimitsu Picasso (relative)
- Website: www.ninagawayukio.com

Yukio Ninagawa (蜷川 幸雄, Ninagawa Yukio; October 15, 1935 – May 12, 2016) was a Japanese theatre director, actor and film director, particularly known for his Japanese language productions of the Greek tragedies as well as Shakespeare—he directed eight distinct renditions of Hamlet. Ninagawa was also emeritus of the Toho Gakuen College of Drama and Music.

Although most famous abroad for his touring productions of European classics, Ninagawa also directed works based on contemporary writing from Japan, including the Modern Noh plays of Yukio Mishima (which toured to New York's Lincoln Center in early summer 2005) and several other plays by Japanese dramatists, including Shūji Terayama and Kunio Shimizu. His production of Titus Andronicus was performed in England in June 2006, at the Royal Shakespeare Theatre in Stratford and the Theatre Royal in Plymouth. In 2007 his company participated in the Barbican International Theatre Event (BITE) series at the Barbican Arts Centre in London, with their production of Coriolanus.

== Biography ==
In 1955 Ninagawa first joined theatre company "Seihai" (‘young actors’). In 1967 he left the group and set up his own theatre company, "Gendaijin-Gekijo" (‘modern people's theatre’). He made his debut as a director in 1969 with Shinjo afururu keihakusa (‘genuine frivolity’?). After the disbandment of “Gendaijin-Gekijo” in 1971, in the following year he established a new theatre company called "Sakura-sha" ('cherry blossom company'), which once again resulted in disbandment three years later, 1974.

At the same time, the year 1974 has become the turning point for Ninagawa, when the then Toho theatre producer Tadao Nakane invited him to direct larger productions, and as a result he came to work on a Shakespeare play for the very first time - Romeo and Juliet. Since then, he has become one of the most feted directors in the theatre world. In 1998 he vowed to direct all of Shakespeare's works, and in the year 2000 he directed the mammoth Greeks, a performance lasting for a total of ten and a half hours.

Beginning in 1983 when he directed Medea, Ninagawa continued to do overseas tours every year, adding to his high reputation in Europe, the US and Canada. He was invited to present a play each year in London, for three years in a row – Midsummer Night's Dream in 1996, Shintokumaru (name of the male protagonist) in 1997, and Hamlet in 1998. In addition he collaborated with the Royal Shakespeare Company from 1999 to 2000 and presented King Lear at London and Stratford-upon-Avon.

Ninagawa won many awards in Japan, and he was awarded honorary doctorates in the UK by the University of Edinburgh (1992) and Plymouth University (2009). He is the father of the photographer and film director Mika Ninagawa.

In his theatrical company Ninagawa Studio (Ninagawa Company), he continued to produce experimental productions with young people. In 2006, he founded a new theatrical group for people over 55 years old called "Saitama Gold Theatre" which is based at Saitama Arts Theatre. (Note: This section is a translation of Ninagawa's Japanese official website with additional notes.)

Ninagawa died of pneumonia at a hospital in Tokyo on May 12, 2016, aged 80.

== Stage direction history ==
(Premier dates only)

- 1969 Nayameru kamigami wa, saredo shuppatsu shi tamawazu (悩める神々は、されど出発し給わず) - by Toshiro Ishido
- 1969 Shinjo afururu keihakusa (真情あふるる軽薄さ) - by Kunio Shimizu
- 1970 Ashita sokoni hana o sasouyo (明日そこに花を挿そうよ) - by Kunio Shimizu
- 1970 Omoide no Nihon ichiman-nen (想い出の日本一萬年) - by Kunio Shimizu
- 1971 Tōkaidō Yotsuya Kaidan (東海道四谷怪談) - by Nanboku Tsuruya IV
- 1971 Karasu yo, oretachi wa dangan o komeru (鴉よ、おれたちは弾丸をこめる) - by Kunio Shimizu
- 1972 Bokura ga hijo no taiga o kudaru toki (ぼくらが非情の大河をくだる時) - by Kunio Shimizu
- 1973 Moudouken (盲導犬) - by Juro Kara
- 1973 Nakanai noka? Nakanai noka 1973-nen no tameni? (泣かないのか？泣かないのか1973年のために？) - by Kunio Shimizu
- 1974 Romeo and Juliet (Romio to Julietto) (ロミオとジュリエット) - by William Shakespeare
- 1975 Karaban, Taki no shiraito (唐版・瀧の白糸) - by Juro Kara based on Kyōka Izumi
- 1975 King Lear (Lia-oh) (リア王) - by William Shakespeare
- 1976 Oedipus Rex (Oidipusu-oh) (オイディプス王) - by Sophocles
- 1976 Kindai Nogakushu – Sotoba Komachi / Yoroboshi (近代能楽集/卒塔婆小町・弱法師)- by Yukio Mishima
- 1977 The Threepenny Opera (Sanmon opera) (三文オペラ) - by Bertolt Brecht
- 1978 Medea (Ohjo Media) (王女メディア) - by Euripides
- 1978 Hamlet (Hamuretto) (ハムレット) - by William Shakespeare
- 1979 Suicide for Love (Chikamatsu shinjuu monogatari) (近松心中物語) - by Matsuyo Akimoto
- 1979 Notre-Dame de Paris (Notorudamu do Pari) (ノートルダム・ド・パリ) - by Victor Hugo
- 1980 NINAGAWA Macbeth (NINAGAWA Makubesu) (NINAGAWAマクベス) - by William Shakespeare
- 1980 Genroku minato uta (元禄港歌) - by Matsuyo Akimoto
- 1981 Shitayamannen-cho monogatari (下谷万年町物語) - by Juro Kara
- 1982 Ame no natsu, 30nin no Juliet ga kaette kita (雨の夏、三十人のジュリエットが還ってきた) - by Kunio Shimizu
- 1982 Nanboku koi monogatari – Hito wa itoshiya (南北恋物語－人はいとしや) - by Matsuyo Akimoto
- 1983 Kuroi tulip (Kuroi chulippu) (黒いチューリップ) - by Juro Kara
- 1984 Nigorie (にごり江) - adapted from the novels by Ichiyō Higuchi
- 1984 Tango at the end of winter (Tango, fuyu no owari ni) (タンゴ・冬の終わりに) - by Kunio Shimizu
- 1984 Genroku minato uta – Sennen no koi no mori (元禄港歌－千年の恋の森) - by Matsuyo Akimoto
- 1984 Three Sisters (Keikoba to iu na no gekijyou de jyouen sareru Sannin shimai) (稽古場という名の劇場で上演される三人姉妹) - by Anton Chekhov
- 1985 Kyofu jidai (恐怖時代) - by Junichiro Tanizaki
- 1985 95 kg to 97 kg no aida (95kgと97kgのあいだ) - by Kunio Shimizu
- 1985 Sakuhin tachi (作品たち)
- 1986 Oedipus Rex (Oidipusu-oh) (オイディプス王)[2nd ver.]
- 1986 Chi no konrei (NINAGAWA少年少女鼓笛隊による血の婚礼) - by Kunio Shimizu
- 1986 Hinmin kurabu (貧民倶楽部) - by Kyōka Izumi
- 1987 The Tempest (Tenpesuto) (テンペスト) - by William Shakespeare
- 1987 Niji no bacteria (虹のバクテリア) - by Isamu Uno
- 1987 Nazeka seishun jidai (なぜか青春時代) - by Kunio Shimizu
- 1987 Gips (Gipusu) (ギプス) - by Isamu Uno
- 1988 Yokubou to iu na no shiden (欲望という名の市電) - based on a play by Tennessee Williams
- 1988 Hamlet (ハムレット)[2nd Ver.]
- 1988 Kanadehon Chushingura (仮名手本忠臣蔵)
- 1990 Peer Gynt (Peerugyunto) (ペールギュント) - by Henrik Ibsen
- 1990 PLAYZONE'90 MASK (PLAYZONE'90 MASK ) - by Johnny Kitagawa
- 1990 Sotoba Komachi (卒塔婆小町) - by Yukio Mishima
- 1991 Tango at the end of winter (Tango, fuyu no owari ni) (タンゴ・冬の終わりに) - by Kunio Shimizu, in an English adaptation by Peter Barnes which starred Alan Rickman and played at the King's Theatre, Edinburgh as part of the Edinburgh Festival before transferring to the Piccadilly Theatre in London
- 1991 1991, matsu (1991・待つ)
- 1991 King Lear (Lia-ou) (リア王)[2nd Ver.]
- 1991 Shichinin misaki (七人みさき) - by Matsuyo Akimoto
- 1991 1992, matsu (1992・待つ)
- 1992 The Flying Dutchman (Samayoeru Oranda-jin) (さまよえるオランダ人)[Opera] - by Richard Wagner
- 1992 SHOW-geki MASK (SHOW劇 MASK) - by Johnny Kitagawa
- 1992 Three Sisters (Sannnin shimai) (三人姉妹)[2nd Ver.]
- 1992 Sennen no machi no Christmas (千年の街のクリスマス)
- 1993 1993, matsu (1993・待つ)
- 1993 Haru (春) - by Isamu Uno
- 1993 Kiki's Delivery Service (Majo no Takkyuubin） (魔女の宅急便)[Musical] - by Eiko Kakuno
- 1993 Shoka no yo no yume (初夏の夜の夢)
- 1994 Peer Gynt [2nd Ver.]
- 1994 A Midsummer Night's Dream (Natsu no Yo no Yume) (夏の夜の夢) - by William Shakespeare
- 1994 Othello (Osero) (オセロー) - by William Shakespeare
- 1994 Waiting for Godot (Godo o machinagara) (ゴドーを待ちながら) - by Samuel Beckett
- 1995 Hamlet (ハムレット)[3rd Ver.]
- 1995 Shintoku-maru (身毒丸) - by Shuji Terayama and Rio Kishida
- 1996 Koboreru kajitsu (零れる果実) - by Toshiro Suzuki and Naoshi Kariba
- 1996 1996, matsu (1996・待つ)
- 1997 Kusameikyuu (草迷宮) - by Rio Kishida
- 1997 Showa Kayou daizenshuu (昭和歌謡大全集) - by Kunio Shimizu based on Ryu Murakami
- 1997 Giniro Kujira no jikan ryokou (銀色クジラの時間旅行)
- 1997 Karumen to yobareta onna (カルメンと呼ばれた女) - by Kensuke Yokouchi
- 1997 Hitachibou Kaison (常陸坊海尊) - by Matsuyo Akimoto
- 1998 Romio and Juliet (ロミオとジュリエット)[2nd Ver.]
- 1998 1998, matsu (1998・待つ)
- 1998 Twelfth Night (Juuni-ya) (十二夜) - by William Shakespeare
- 1999 King Richard III (Richaado Sansei) (リチャード三世) - by William Shakespeare
- 1999 The Seagull(Kamome) (かもめ) - by Anton Chekhov
- 1999 King Lear (Lia-ou) (リア王)[3rd Ver.]
- 1999 Pandora no Kane (パンドラの鐘) - by Hideki Noda
- 2000 Three Sisters (Sannin shimai) (三人姉妹)[3rd Ver.]
- 2000 The Greeks (Guriikusu) (グリークス) - by John Barton and Kenneth Cavender
- 2000 Modern Noh Plays (Kindai Nogakushuu) (近代能楽集 卒塔婆小町／弱法師) [2nd Ver.]
- 2000 NINAGAWA Phoenix (NINAGAWA Hi no Tori) (NINAGAWA火の鳥) - based on comics by Osamu Tezuka
- 2001 Shinjo afururu keihakusa 2001 (真情あふるる軽薄さ2001)[2nd Ver.]
- 2001 Macbeth (Makubesu) (マクベス)[2nd Ver.]
- 2001 The Threepenny Opera (三文オペラ)[2nd Ver.]
- 2001 Hamlet (ハムレット)[4th Ver.]
- 2001 2001, matsu (2001・待つ)
- 2001 Yotsuya Kaidan (四谷怪談)[2nd Ver.]
- 2002 A Streetcar Named Desire (Yokubou to iu na no densha) (欲望という名の電車) - by Tennessee Williams
- 2002 Oedipus Rex (Oidipusu-oh) (オイディプス王)[3rd Ver.]
- 2003 The Cherry Orchard (Sakura no Sono) (桜の園) - by Anton Chekhov
- 2003 Pericles (Perikuriizu) (ペリクリーズ) - by William Shakespeare, a production which played on the Olivier stage of the Royal National Theatre
- 2003 Electra (Erekutora) (エレクトラ) - by Sophocles
- 2003 Hamlet (ハムレット)[5th Ver.]
- 2004 Titus Andronicus (Taitasu Andoronikasu) (タイタス・アンドロニカス) - by William Shakespeare
- 2004 Shin Chikamatsu shinjuu monogatari (新・近松心中物語)[2nd Ver.]
- 2004 Shibuya kara toku hanarete (シブヤから遠く離れて) - by Ryo Iwamatsu
- 2004 As You Like It (Okini mesumama) (お気に召すまま) - by William Shakespeare
- 2004 Hamlet[6th Ver.]
- 2004 Romeo and Juliet (ロミオとジュリエット)[3rd Ver.]
- 2005 Maboroshi ni kokoro mo sozoro kuruoshi no warera Masakado (幻に心もそぞろ狂おしのわれら将門) - by Kunio Shimizu
- 2005 The Kitchen (キッチン) - by Arnold Wesker
- 2005 Medea (メディア)[2nd Ver.]
- 2005 NINAGAWA Twelfth Night (NINAGAWA Juuni-ya) (NINAGAWA十二夜)[Kabuki] - based on a play by William Shakespeare
- 2005 Tenpou Juuninen no Shakespeare (天保十二年のシェイクスピア) - by Hisashi Inoue
- 2006 The Comedy of Errors (Machigai no Kigeki) (間違いの喜劇) - by William Shakespeare
- 2006 Byakuya no warukyuure (白夜の女騎士) - by Hideki Noda
- 2006 'Tis Pity She's a Whore (Aware kanojo wa shofu) (あわれ彼女は娼婦) - by John Ford
- 2006 Orestes (Oresutesu) (オレステス) - by Euripides
- 2007 Coriolanus (Korioreinasu) (コリオレイナス) - by William Shakespeare
- 2007 The Lark (Hibari) (ひばり) - by Jean Anouilh
- 2007 Love's Labour's Lost (Koi no honeorizon) (恋の骨折り損) - by William Shakespeare
- 2007 Yabuhara kengyo (藪原検校) - by Hisashi Inoue
- 2007 Senjyo no picnic (船上のピクニック) - by Ryo Iwamatsu
- 2007 Eréndira (エレンディラ) - adapted from the short novels by Gabriel García Márquez
- 2007 Othello (Osero) (オセロー)[2nd Ver.]
- 2007 Caligula(Karigyura) (カリギュラ) - by Albert Camus
- 2008 King Lear (Lia-ou) (リア王)[4th Ver.]
- 2008 Farewell My Concubine (Saraba, waga Ai Haoubekki)(さらば、わが愛 覇王別姫) - adapted from the novel by Lilian Lee
- 2008 Waga tamashii wa kagayaku mizu nari (わが魂は輝く水なり) - by Kunio Shimizu
- 2008 Dougen no Bouken (道元の冒険) - by Hisashi Inoue
- 2008 95 kg to 97 kg no aida (95kgと97kgのあいだ)[2nd Ver.] - by Kunio Shimizu
- 2008 Glass Mask(Garasu no Kamen) (ガラスの仮面) - adapted from the comic by Suzue Miuchi
- 2008 Much Ado About Nothing(Kara sawagi) (から騒ぎ) - by William Shakespeare
- 2008 Omote ura gennai kaeru gassen (表裏源内蛙合戦) - by Hisashi Inoue
- 2009 The Winter's Tale(Fuyu monogatari) (冬物語) - by William Shakespeare
- 2009 Musashi (ムサシ) - by Hisashi Inoue
- 2009 Ame no natsu, 30nin no Juliet ga kaette kita (雨の夏、三十人のジュリエットが還ってきた) [2nd Ver.] - by Kunio Shimizu
- 2009 Ando ke no ichiya (アンドゥ家の一夜) - by Kerarino Sandrovich
- 2009 The Coast of Utopia（kosuto obu yutopia） (コースト・オブ・ユートピア) - by Tom Stoppard
- 2009 Sanada fuunroku (真田風雲録) - by Yoshiyuki Fukuda
- 2009 Twelve Angry Men (Jyuni nin no ikareru otoko) (十二人の怒れる男) - by Reginald Rose
- 2010 Henry VI Part 1, Part2, Part3(Henrii rokusei) (ヘンリー六世) - by William Shakespeare

== Film direction history ==
- 1981 Masho no natsu (The Summer of Evil Spirits) - based on the story Yotsuya Kaidan
- 2003 The Blue Light - based on the novel by Yusuke Kishi
- 2004 Warau Iemon - based on the novel by Natsuhiko Kyogoku
- 2008 Hebi ni piasu - based on the novel Snakes and Earrings by Hitomi Kanehara
