= The Story of Yonosuke =

- Film poster
- Directed by: Shuichi Okita
- Screenplay by: Shirō Maeda
- Based on: Yokomichi Yonosuke by Shūichi Yoshida
- Produced by: Toshikazu Nishigaya; Yuki Nishimiya; Yasushi Yamazaki
- Starring: Kengo Kora; Yuriko Yoshitaka; Sosuke Ikematsu; Ayumi Itō; Gō Ayano
- Cinematography: Ryūto Kondō
- Edited by: Takashi Sato
- Music by: Ren Takada
- Distributed by: Showgate Inc.
- Release date: February 23, 2013 (Japan)
- Running time: 160 minutes
- Country: Japan
- Language: Japanese

The Story of Yonosuke (Japanese: 横道世之介, Hepburn: Yokomichi Yonosuke), also known as A Story of Yonosuke, is a 2013 Japanese film directed by Shuichi Okita. The theme song is called "Ima o Ikite" (今を生きて; lit. 'Living in the Now') and is performed by Asian Kung-Fu Generation.

The film was shown at the 13th Japanese Film Festival Nippon Connection in June 2013. It premiered in America on July 13, 2013 at the New York Asian Film Festival and has also made an appearance at the San Diego Asian Film Festival and the Japanese Film Festival in Australia.

== Plot ==
The story is set in Tokyo in 1987 where Yonosuke Yokomichi has arrived from Nagasaki to study Business Administration at Hosei University. Relative to the other students his suit is crumpled and his hair is uncombed.

He meets Kuramochi, another unconventional student at the introductory meeting, and meets the pretty Yui Akutsu at the formal registration and they agree to explore together rather than be alone.

He encounters Chiharu, a would-be actress in a cafe, and she uses him to extort a car from a businessman. He tells this story to a new friend, Kato, who asks him to join on a double date. His date, Shoko Yosano, the daughter of a rich businessman, arrives in a chauffeur-driven car. They go to a cheap burger cafe but are forced to sit as two pairs. Shoko likes him and tracks him down to ask him to the pool where she introduces him to her half-brother, Katsuhiko, and his rich friends. Here he re-encounters the actress.

Shoko comes to visit him at his parents' house in a coastal village. The next day they go to the beach with friends. While they are having a potentially romantic solitary rendezvous on the beach during the night, their first kiss is disturbed by the arrival of a group of Vietnamese boat people on the beach, and during the confusion a baby is passed to them.

== Cast ==
- Kengo Kora as Yonosuke Yokomichi
- Yuriko Yoshitaka as Shōko Yosano
- Sosuke Ikematsu as Ippei Kuramochi
- Ayumi Itō as Chiharu
- Gō Ayano as Katō
- Aki Asakura
- Keiko Horiuchi as the mother of Shōko
- Mei Kurokawa
- Noriko Eguchi
- Arata Iura
- Jun Kunimura as the father of Shōko
- Kitarō as the father of Yonosuke
- Kimiko Yo as the mother of Yonosuke

== Reception ==
It was chosen as the 3rd best film at the 23rd Japan Film Professional Awards and as the 8th best Japanese film of the year by film magazine Eiga Geijutsu.

Award	Date	Category	Recipients and nominees	Result
Mainichi Film Award	January 2014	Best Supporting Actress	Yuriko Yoshitaka	Won
Mainichi Film Award	January 2014	Best Sound Recording	Masato Yano	Won
Blue Ribbon Awards	11 February 2014	Best Picture	A Story of Yonosuke	Won
Blue Ribbon Awards	11 February 2014	Best Actor	Kengo Kora	Won
Japan Film Professional Awards	June 2014	Best Director	Shuichi Okita	Won
Japan Film Professional Awards	June 2014	Best Actor	Kengo Kora	Won
