= The Whispering of the Gods =

- DVD cover
- Directed by: Tatsushi Ōmori
- Written by: Yoshio Urasawa
- Based on: Gerumaniumu no yoru by Mangetsu Hanamura
- Produced by: Shinichiro Muraoka; Genjiro Arato
- Starring: Hirofumi Arai; Nao Ōmori
- Cinematography: Ryō Ohtsuka
- Edited by: Yoshiyuki Okuhara
- Music by: Shuichi Chino
- Production company: Arato Film Inc.
- Distributed by: Arato Film Inc.
- Release date: December 17, 2005 (Japan)
- Running time: 107 minutes
- Country: Japan
- Language: Japanese

The Whispering of the Gods (Japanese: ゲルマニウムの夜, Hepburn: Gerumaniumu no Yoru) is a 2005 Japanese drama film directed by Tatsushi Ōmori and based on a 1998 novel by Mangetsu Hanamura. Released without approval from Eirin, the film details abuse in a tight-knit Catholic farming community where a teenager who has committed murder takes refuge.
