= Tatsushi Ōmori =

Japanese film director and actor (born 1970)

- Born: 4 September 1970 (age 56); Tokyo, Japan
- Occupations: Film director, actor

Tatsushi Ōmori (大森立嗣, Ōmori Tatsushi; born 4 September 1970) is a Japanese film director and actor.

== Career ==
Ōmori was born in Tokyo as the eldest son of Akaji Maro, an actor and butoh dancer. His younger brother, Nao Ōmori, is an actor.

While in college, he began making 8 mm films, but started working as an actor after graduation. While acting in Junji Sakamoto's Scarred Angels, he also became a member of the staff. He appeared in and helped produce Hiroshi Okuhara's Wave, which won the NETPAC Award at the 2002 Rotterdam Film Festival. In 2005, he directed his first film, The Whispering of the Gods. His second film, A Crowd of Three, earned him the 2010 Directors Guild of Japan New Directors Award. His 2013 film The Ravine of Goodbye won the Special Jury Prize at the 35th Moscow International Film Festival.

== Selected filmography ==
=== Director ===
- The Whispering of the Gods (2005)
- A Crowd of Three (2010)
- Tada's Do-It-All House (2011)
- Bozo (2013)
- The Ravine of Goodbye (2013)
- Setoutsumi (2016)
- And Then There Was Light (2017)
- Every Day a Good Day (2018)
- Taro the Fool (2019)
- Under the Stars (2020)
- Mother (2020)
- Goodbye Cruel World (2022)
- The Women in the Lakes (2024)
- Hokusai's Daughter (2025)
- The Realm Beyond (2028)

=== Producer ===
- Wave (2001) (directed by Hiroshi Okuhara)

=== Actor ===
- Scarred Angels (1999)
- Our Homeland (2012)
