= List of Japanese films of 2015 =

A list of Japanese films that were first released in 2015.

== Highest-grossing films ==
The following is a list of the 10 highest-grossing Japanese films at the Japanese box office during 2015, according to the Motion Picture Producers Association of Japan.

| Rank | Title | Gross |
|---|---|---|
| 1 | Yo-kai Watch: The Movie | ¥7.80 billion ($64.44 million) |
| 2 | The Boy and the Beast | ¥5.85 billion ($48.33 million) |
| 3 | Hero | ¥4.67 billion ($38.58 million) |
| 4 | Detective Conan: Sunflowers of Inferno | ¥4.48 billion ($37.01 million) |
| 5 | Doraemon: Nobita's Space Heroes | ¥3.93 billion ($32.47 million) |
| 6 | Dragon Ball Z: Resurrection 'F' | ¥3.74 billion ($30.9 million) |
| 7 | Attack on Titan | ¥3.25 billion ($26.85 million) |
| 8 | Flying Colors | ¥2.84 billion ($23.46 million) |
| 8 | Love Live! The School Idol Movie | ¥2.84 billion ($23.46 million) |
| 10 | Assassination Classroom | ¥2.77 billion ($22.88 million) |

== Film releases ==
=== January – March ===
| Opening | | Title | Cast and crew | Details | Genre(s) | Ref(s) |
|---|---|---|---|---|---|---|
| J A N U A R Y | 9 | Psycho-Pass: The Movie | Director: Katsuyuki Motohiro, Naoyoshi Shiotani; Cast: Kana Hanazawa, Hiroshi Kamiya, Tomokazu Seki, Ayane Sakura | Based on an anime. | Crime, Sci-fi, Action | |
| J A N U A R Y | 10 | ST: Red and White investigation Files the Movie | Director: Tōya Satō; Cast: Tatsuya Fujiwara, Masaki Okada, Mirai Shida, Sei Ashina, Masataka Kubota | Based on a television series. | Drama, Crime, Mystery | |
| J A N U A R Y | 17 | From Kobe | Director: Mitsuhito Shiraha; Cast: Izumi Fujimoto, Eiji Sugawara, Arisa Urahama | Based on a manga. | Drama | |
| J A N U A R Y | 17 | Again | Director: Sumio Ōmori; Cast: Kiichi Nakai, Emi Wakui, Toshirō Yanagiba | Based on a novel. | Drama, Sports | |
| J A N U A R Y | 17 | Bali Big Brother | Director: Toshio Lee; Cast: Shinichi Tsutsumi, Machiko Ono, Naoto Inti Raymi, Nanao | Based on a novel. | Drama, Comedy | |
| J A N U A R Y | 17 | Wonderful World End | Director: Daigo Matsui; Cast: Ai Hashimoto, Laurent Lafitte, Jun Aonami, Yu Inaba | Based on a novel. | Drama, Youth, Musical | |
| J A N U A R Y | 24 | Kabukicho Love Hotel | Director: Ryūichi Hiroki; Cast: Shōta Sometani, Atsuko Maeda, Lee Eun-woo, Son Il-kwon, Kaho Minami | Based on a novel. | Thriller, Action | |
| J A N U A R Y | 31 | Joker Game | Director: Yu Irie; Cast: Kazuya Kamenashi, Yūsuke Iseya, Kyoko Fukada, Keisuke Koide, Harry Yamamoto | Based on a novel. | Historical, Drama | |
| J A N U A R Y | 31 | Maestro! | Director: Shōtarō Kobayashi; Cast: Tori Matsuzaka, Miwa, Aoba Kawai | Based on a manga. | Drama, Musical | |
| J A N U A R Y | 31 | A Stitch of Life | Director: Yukiko Mishima; Cast: Miki Nakatani, Takahiro Miura, Hairi Katagiri, Haru Kuroki, Hana Sugisaki | Based on a manga. | Drama | |
| J A N U A R Y | 31 | Midnight Diner | Director: Joji Matsuoka; Cast: Kaoru Kobayashi, Saki Takaoka, Tokio Emoto, Mikako Tabe | Based on a novel. | Drama, Romance | |
| F E B R U A R Y | 7 | Sukimasuki | Director: Kōta Yoshida; Cast: Keita Machida, Kokone Sasaki, Kokone Sasaki, Eriko Nakamura | Based on a manga. | Drama, Comedy | |
| F E B R U A R Y | 13 | Terrace House: Closing Door | Director: Masato Maeda; Cast: Tetsuya Sugaya, Yuiko Matsukawa, Maya Izumi, Jin Otabe, Keisuke Yoshino | Based on a television series. | Drama | |
| F E B R U A R Y | 13 | Her Granddaughter | Director: Ryūichi Hiroki; Cast: Nana Eikura, Etsushi Toyokawa, Osamu Mukai, Sakura Ando, Tomoya Maeno | Based on a manga. | Drama | |
| F E B R U A R Y | 14 | La La La at Rock Bottom | Director: Nobuhiro Yamashita; Cast: Subaru Shibutani, Fumi Nikaidō, Sarina Suzuki, Aka Inu, Nezumi Tenjiku | Based on a novel. | Youth, Musical | |
| F E B R U A R Y | 14 | The Mourner | Director: Yukihiko Tsutsumi; Cast: Kengo Kora, Yuriko Ishida, Arata Iura, Yusuke Yamamoto, Yumi Asō | Based on a novel. | Drama | |
| F E B R U A R Y | 14 | Little Forest Part 2 | Director: Junichi Mori; Cast: Ai Hashimoto, Takahiro Miura, Mayu Matsuoka, Yoichi Nukumizu | Based on a manga. | Fantasy, Drama | |
| F E B R U A R Y | 20 | The Case of Hana & Alice | Director: Shunji Iwai; Cast: Yū Aoi, Anne Suzuki, Ryo Katsuji, Haru Kuroki | Based on a film, a prequel film from Hana and Alice. | Youth | |
| F E B R U A R Y | 27 | The Curtain Rises | Director: Katsuyuki Motohiro; Cast: Kanako Momota, Shiori Tamai, Ayaka Sasaki, Momoka Ariyasu | Based on a novel. | Drama, Comedy | |
| F E B R U A R Y | 27 | Have a Song on Your Lips | Director: Takahiro Miki; Cast: Masachika Ichimura, Yukie Nakama, Kanako Yanagihara, Yūsuke Santamaria, Kōta Yokoyama | Based on a novel. | Drama, Youth | |
| M A R C H | 6 | Knights of Sidonia | Director: Kōbun Shizuno; Cast: Ryōta Ōsaka, Aya Suzaki, Aki Toyosaki, Hisako Kanemoto, Yukari Tamura | Based on a manga. | Sci-fi, Action, Space opera | |
| M A R C H | 7 | Doraemon: Nobita's Space Heroes | Director: Yoshihiro Osugi; Cast: Wasabi Mizuta, Megumi Ōhara | Based on a manga. | Children's | |
| M A R C H | 7 | PriPara the Movie: Everyone, Assemble! Prism ☆ Tours | Director: Masakazu Hishida, Nobutaka Yoda; Cast: Himika Akaneya, Yū Serizawa, Miyu Kubota, Saki Yamakita, Azuki Shibuya | Based on a manga. | Musical | |
| M A R C H | 7 | Solomon's Perjury Part 1: Suspicion | Director: Izuru Narushima; Cast: Ryōko Fujino, Mizuki Itagaki, Anna Ishii, Hiroya Shimizu, Miu Tomita | Based on a novel. | Mystery | |
| M A R C H | 14 | Pretty Cure All Stars: Carnival of Spring♪ | Director: Junji Shimizu; Cast: Megumi Nakajima, Megumi Han, Hitomi Nabatame, Minako Kotobuki, Mai Fuchigami | Based on an anime. | Fantasy, Action | |
| M A R C H | 14 | Beyond the Boundary: I'll Be Here – Past | Director: Taichi Ishidate; Cast: Risa Taneda, Kenn, Minori Chihara, Tatsuhisa Suzuki | Based on a light novel. | Drama, Dark fantasy, Romance | |
| M A R C H | 14 | The Lion Standing in the Wind | Director: Takashi Miike; Cast: Takao Osawa, Satomi Ishihara, Yōko Maki, Masato Hagiwara | Based on a song. | Historical, Drama | |
| M A R C H | 14 | Strobe Edge | Director: Ryūichi Hiroki; Cast: Kasumi Arimura, Sota Fukushi, Jingi Irie, Yūki Yamada | Based on a manga. | Romance | |
| M A R C H | 14 | Ultraman Ginga S The Movie | Director: Koichi Sakamoto Cast: Takuya Negishi, Kiyotaka Uji, Taiyo Sugiura, Arisa Komiya, Ryuichi Ohura, Yukari Taki, Takahiro Katou, Takuya Kusakawa, Rina Koike, Moga Mogami | Based on a television series, a sequel to Ultraman Ginga S. | Tokusastsu, Action | |
| M A R C H | 21 | Assassination Classroom | Director: Eiichirō Hasumi; Cast: Sota Fukushi, Yuma Nakayama, Yuki Furukawa, Renn Kiriyama | Based on a manga. | Sci-fi, Action, Comedy | |
| M A R C H | 21 | Super Hero Taisen GP: Kamen Rider 3 | Director: Takayuki Shibasaki Cast: Ryoma Takeuchi, Rio Uchida, Yu Inaba, Rei Yoshii, Kenta Hamano, Shunsuke Nishikawa, Gaku Matsumoto, Kaito Nakamura, Yuuka Yano, Kasumi Yamaya, Takashi Sasano | Based on the Kamen Rider Drive and Shuriken Sentai Ninninger television series. | Tokusastu, Action | |

=== April – June ===
| Opening | | Title | Cast and crew | Details | Genre(s) | Ref(s) |
|---|---|---|---|---|---|---|
| A P R I L | 1 | April Fools | Director: Junichi Ishikawa; Cast: Erika Toda, Tori Matsuzaka, Yūsuke Santamaria, Yukiyoshi Ozawa | Based on a novel. | Drama, Comedy drama | |
| A P R I L | 4 | A Farewell to Jinu | Director: Suzuki Matsuo; Cast: Ryuhei Matsuda, Sadao Abe, Takako Matsu, Toshiyuki Nishida | Based on a manga. | Comedy | |
| A P R I L | 4 | Persona 3 The Movie: No. 3, Falling Down | Director: Keitaro Motonaga; Cast: Akira Ishida, Megumi Toyoguchi, Kōsuke Toriumi, Rie Tanaka | Based on a video game. | Dark fantasy, Action | |
| A P R I L | 4 | Tamayura ~Graduation Photo~ | Director: Junichi Sato; Cast: Ayana Taketatsu, Kana Asumi, Yūko Gibu, Yuka Iguchi | Based on a manga. | Comedy drama, Drama | |
| A P R I L | 11 | Solomon's Perjury Part 1: Suspicion | Director: Izuru Narushima; Cast: Ryōko Fujino, Mizuki Itagaki, Anna Ishii, Hiroya Shimizu, Miu Tomita | Based on a novel. | Mystery | |
| A P R I L | 17 | Detective Conan: Sunflowers of Inferno | Director: Kōbun Shizuno; Cast: Minami Takayama, Wakana Yamazaki | Based on a manga. | Mystery | |
| A P R I L | 17 | Crayon Shin-chan: My Moving Story! Cactus Large Attack! | Director: Masakazu Hashimoto; Cast: Cast: Yumiko Kobayashi, Miki Narahashi, Toshiyuki Morikawa | Based on a manga. | Comedy | |
| A P R I L | 17 | Vampire in Love | Director: Mai Suzuki; Cast: Cast: Mirei Kiritani, Shōta Totsuka, Seiichi Tanabe, Nene Otsuka | Based on a novel. | Romance, Comedy | |
| A P R I L | 18 | Dragon Ball Z: Resurrection 'F' | Director: Tadayoshi Yamamuro; Cast: Masako Nozawa, Ryō Horikawa, Ryūsei Nakao, Masako Nozawa, Masaharu Satō | Based on a manga. | Fantasy, Action | |
| A P R I L | 25 | Ryuzo and the Seven Henchmen | Director: Takeshi Kitano; Cast: Tatsuya Fuji, Masaomi Kondō, Tōru Shinagawa, Ben Hiura | Based on a novel. | Action, Comedy | |
| A P R I L | 25 | Parasyte: Part 2 | Director: Takashi Yamazaki; Cast: Shōta Sometani, Eri Fukatsu, Sadao Abe, Ai Hashimoto | Based on a manga. | Horror, Action | |
| A P R I L | 25 | Beyond the Boundary: I'll Be Here – Future | Director: Taichi Ishidate; Cast: Risa Taneda, Kenn, Minori Chihara, Tatsuhisa Suzuki | Based on a light novel. | Drama, Dark fantasy, Romance | |
| M A Y | 2 | Flying Colors | Director: Nobuhiro Doi; Cast: Kasumi Arimura, Atsushi Itō, Shūhei Nomura, Yūhei Ōuchida | Based on a novel. | Political, Comedy | |
| M A Y | 2 | The Next Generation: Patlabor | Director: Mamoru Oshii; Cast: Erina Mano, Seiji Fukushi, Rina Ōta, Shigeru Chiba | Based on a manga. | Sci-fi, Action | |
| M A Y | 8 | Poison Berry in My Brain | Director: Yūichi Satō; Cast: Yoko Maki, Hidetoshi Nishijima, Ryunosuke Kamiki, Yō Yoshida | Based on a manga. | Romance, Comedy | |
| M A Y | 8 | Miss Hokusai | Director: Keiichi Hara; Cast: Anne Watanabe, Yutaka Matsushige, Gaku Hamada, Kengo Kora, Jun Miho | Based on a manga. | Histortical, Drama | |
| M A Y | 16 | Akegarasu | Director: Yuichi Fukuda; Cast: Masaki Suda, Yu Shirota, Ryuya Wakaba, Riho Yoshioka, Hayato Kakizawa | Based on a stage. | Drama, Thriller | |
| M A Y | 16 | Kakekomi | Director: Masato Harada; Cast: Yo Oizumi, Erika Toda, Hikari Mitsushima, Rina Uchiyama | Based on a novel. | Historical, Comedy | |
| M A Y | 16 | Deadman Inferno: Z Island | Director: Hiroshi Shinagawa; Cast: Show Aikawa, Sawa Suzuki, Yūichi Kimura, Daisuke Migakawa | Based on a novel. | Horror, Action | |
| M A Y | 23 | Initiation Love | Director: Yukihiko Tsutsumi; Cast: Atsuko Maeda, Kanro Morita, Shota Matsuda, Fumino Kimura, Takahiro Miura | Based on a novel. | Romance | |
| M A Y | 30 | Shinjuku Swan | Director: Sion Sono; Cast: Gō Ayano, Takayuki Yamada, Erika Sawajiri, Yūsuke Iseya, Jun Murakami | Based on a manga. | Comedy, Action | |
| M A Y | 30 | Sweet Bean | Director: Naomi Kawase; Cast: Kirin Kiki, Masatoshi Nagase, Kyara Uchida, Etsuko Ichihara | Based on a novel. | Historical, Drama | |
| J U N E | 6 | Mother's Trees | Director: Itsumichi Isomura; Cast: Kyōka Suzuki, Mirai Shida, Takahiro Miura, Takehiro Hira, Seiichi Tanabe | Based on a novel. | Historical | |
| J U N E | 6 | Pieta in the Toilet | Director: Daishi Matsunaga; Cast: Yojiro Noda, Hana Sugisaki, Lily Franky, Saya Ichikawa, Shinobu Otake | Based on a novel. | Drama, Youth | |
| J U N E | 6 | Prophecy | Director: Yoshihiro Nakamura; Cast: Toma Ikuta, Erika Toda, Ryohei Suzuki, Gaku Hamada | Based on a novel. | Mystery, Thriller | |
| J U N E | 13 | Love Live! The School Idol Movie | Director: Takahiko Kyōgoku; Cast: Emi Nitta, Yoshino Nanjō, Aya Uchida, Suzuko Mimori | Based on a manga. | Musical | |
| J U N E | 13 | Our Little Sister | Director: Hirokazu Kore-eda; Cast: Haruka Ayase, Masami Nagasawa, Kaho, Suzu Hirose, Ryo Kase | Based on a manga. | Drama | |
| J U N E | 13 | Innocent Lilies 2 | Director: Koichi Sakamoto; Cast: Moga Mogami, Yumeni Nemu, Furukawa Mirin, Eimi Naruse, Fujisaki Ayane, Aizawa Risa | Based on a novel. | Fantasy, Action | |
| J U N E | 20 | The Pearls of the Stone Man | Director: Yūzō Asahara; Cast: Koichi Sato, Kanako Higuchi, Keiko Kitagawa, Shūhei Nomura, Hana Sugisaki | Based on a novel. | Drama | |
| J U N E | 20 | Yakuza Apocalypse | Director: Takashi Miike; Cast: Hayato Ichihara, Yayan Ruhian, Riko Narumi, Lily Franky | Based on a novel. | Horror, Dark fantasy, Action | |
| J U N E | 20 | Ghost in the Shell: The New Movie | Director: Kazuya Nomura; Cast: Maaya Sakamoto, Ikkyuu Juku, Kenichirou Matsuda, Tarusuke Shingaki, Shunsuke Sakuya | Based on a manga. | Sci-fi, Action | |
| J U N E | 20 | Ju-On: The Final Curse | Director: Masayuki Ochiai; Cast: Airi Taira, Renn Kiriyama, Nonoka Ono, Yurina Yanagi, Miyabi Matsuura, RIMI | Based on a franchise. | Horror | |
| J U N E | 28 | Strayer's Chronicle | Director: Takahisa Zeze; Cast: Masaki Okada, Shōta Sometani, Riko Narumi, Mayu Matsuoka | Based on a novel. | Science fantasy, Action, Youth | |
| J U N E | 28 | Chasuke's Journey | Director: Sabu; Cast: Kenichi Matsuyama, Ito Ohno, Ren Osugi, Yūsuke Iseya | Based on a novel. | Fantasy, Drama, Comedy drama | |
| J U N E | 28 | Love & Peace | Director: Sion Sono; Cast: Hiroki Hasegawa, Kumiko Asō, Kiyohiko Shibukawa, Eita Okuno, Makita Sports | Based on a novel. | Sci-fi | |

=== July – September ===
| Opening | | Title | Cast and crew | Details | Genre(s) | Ref(s) |
|---|---|---|---|---|---|---|
| J U L Y | 4 | Ao Oni ver2.0 | Director: Daisuke Nibayashi; Cast: Anna Iriyama, Kenta Suga, Seika Furuhata | Based on a video game. | Horror, Action | |
| J U L Y | 11 | The Boy and the Beast | Director: Mamoru Hosoda; Cast: Kōji Yakusho, Shōta Sometani, Suzu Hirose, Yo Oizumi, Lily Franky | Based on a novel. | Fantasy, Action | |
| J U L Y | 11 | Tag | Director: Sion Sono; Cast: Reina Triendl, Mariko Shinoda, Erina Mano, Yuki Sakurai, Maryjun Takahashi | Based on a novel. | Horror, Comedy | |
| J U L Y | 18 | Meiji Tokyo Renka the Movie: Serenade of the Crescent Moon | Director: Hiroshi Watanabe; Cast: Sumire Morohoshi, Nobuhiko Okamoto, Daisuke Namikawa, KENN, Kōsuke Toriumi | Based on a television series. | Historical, Romance | |
| J U L Y | 18 | HERO | Director: Masayuki Suzuki; Cast: Noriko Kijima, Haruna Yoshizumi, Yuki Mamiya | Based on a television series. | Comedy drama, Mystery, Thriller | |
| J U L Y | 18 | Pokémon the Movie: Hoopa and the Clash of Ages | Director: Kunihiko Yuyama, Mikinori Sakakibara; Cast: Rica Matsumoto, Ikue Ōtani, Masachika Ichimura | Based on a video game. | Fantasy, Action | |
| J U L Y | 25 | Nowhere Girl | Director: Mamoru Oshii; Cast: Nana Seino, Nobuaki Kaneko, Lily, Hirotarō Honda | | Mystery, Action | |
| J U L Y | 25 | Brain Fluid Explosion Girl | Director: Yuichi Abe; Cast: Hinata Kashiwagi, Haruka, Shiraishimoka Kami, Sae Okazaki | Based on a song. | Drama, Science fantasy, Youth | |
| A U G U S T | 1 | Corpse Party | Director: Masafumi Yamada; Cast: Rina Ikoma, Ryōsuke Ikeoka, Nozomi Maeda, Ren Ishikawa | Based on a video game. | Horror, Drama | |
| A U G U S T | 1 | Attack on Titan | Director: Shinji Higuchi; Cast: Haruma Miura, Hiroki Hasegawa, Kiko Mizuhara, Kanata Hongō, Takahiro Miura | Based on a manga. | Horror, Dark fantasy, Action | |
| A U G U S T | 7 | Boruto: Naruto the Movie | Director: Hiroyuki Yamashita; Cast: Yūko Sanpei, Kokoro Kikuchi, Junko Takeuchi, Noriaki Sugiyama, Ryūichi Kijima | Based on a manga. | Fantasy, Action, Superheroes | |
| A U G U S T | 8 | The Emperor in August | Director: Masato Harada; Cast: Kōji Yakusho, Masahiro Motoki, Yumi Kakazu, Tori Matsuzakai, Kenichi Yajima | Based on a manga. | Historical, Drama | |
| A U G U S T | 22 | Date A Live: Mayuri Judgement | Director: Keitaro Motonaga; Cast: Nobunaga Shimazaki, Marina Inoue, Misuzu Togashi, Ayana Taketatsu | Based on an original story. | Fantasy, Action | |
| A U G U S T | 22 | Hikawa Maru Monogatari | Director: Shunji Ōga; Cast: Chihiro Kusaka, Keisuke Kōmoto | Based on the book of the same name. | | |
| A U G U S T | 28 | Yowamushi Pedal The Movie | Director: Norihiro Naganuma; Cast: Daiki Yamashita, Kōsuke Toriumi, Jun Fukushima, Hiroki Yasumoto, Showtaro Morikubo | Based on a manga. | Fantasy, Drama | |
| A U G U S T | 28 | S The Last Policeman - Recovery of Our Future | Director: Shunichi Hirano; Cast: Osamu Mukai, Gō Ayano, Yui Aragaki, Kazue Fukiishi, Munetaka Aoki | Based on a manga. | Sci-fi, Action | |
| A U G U S T | 28 | Romance | Director: Yuki Tanada; Cast: Yuko Oshima, Koji Okura, Yoshimi Nozaki, Masataka Kubota, Megumi Nishimuta | Based on a novel. | Drama, Romance | |
| S E P T E M B E R | 4 | The Virgin Psychics | Director: Sion Sono; Cast: Shōta Sometani, Mika Akizuki, Tokio Emoto, Motoki Fukami, Mizuki Hoshina | Based on a manga. | Horror, Comedy, Science fantasy | |
| S E P T E M B E R | 4 | Unfair: The End | Director: Shimako Satō; Cast: Ryoko Shinohara, Kento Nagayama, Sadao Abe, Masaya Kato, Akira | Based on a television series. | Thriller, Action | |
| S E P T E M B E R | 5 | Piece of Cake | Director: Tomorowo Taguchi; Cast: Mikako Tabe, Gō Ayano, Tori Matsuzaka, Fumino Kimura, Kaoru Mitsumune | Based on a manga. | Romance, Youth | |
| S E P T E M B E R | 12 | The Big Bee | Director: Yukihiko Tsutsumi; Cast: Yōsuke Eguchi, Masahiro Motoki, Yukie Nakama, Gō Ayano, Jun Kunimura | Based on a novel. | Action, Sci-fi | |
| S E P T E M B E R | 19 | Attack on Titan | Director: Shinji Higuchi; Cast: Haruma Miura, Hiroki Hasegawa, Kiko Mizuhara, Kanata Hongō, Takahiro Miura | Based on a manga. | Horror, Dark fantasy, Action | |
| S E P T E M B E R | 19 | The Anthem of the Heart | Director: Tatsuyuki Nagai; Cast: Inori Minase, Kōki Uchiyama, Sora Amamiya, Yoshimasa Hosoya | Based on a novel. | Drama, Romance | |
| S E P T E M B E R | 19 | How Heroine’s Disqualified | Director: Tsutomu Hanabusa; Cast: Mirei Kiritani, Kento Yamazaki, Kentaro Sakaguchi, Ayano Fukuda | Based on a manga. | Drama, Romance | |
| S E P T E M B E R | 26 | Gonin Saga | Director: Takashi Ishii; Cast: Masahiro Higashide, Kenta Kiritani, Anna Tsuchiya, Tasuku Emoto | Based on a 1995 film. | Action | |
| S E P T E M B E R | 26 | Gassoh | Director: Tatsuo Kobayashii Cast: Koji Seto, Yūya Yagira, Amane Okayama | Based on a samurai. | Historical, Drama | |

=== October – December ===
| Opening | | Title | Cast and crew | Details | Genre(s) | Ref(s) |
|---|---|---|---|---|---|---|
| O C T O B E R | 1 | Journey to the Shore | Director: Kiyoshi Kurosawa; Cast: Tadanobu Asano, Eri Fukatsu, Masao Komatsu, Yū Aoi, Akira Emoto | Based on a novel. | Drama | |
| O C T O B E R | 2 | Bakuman | Director: Hitoshi Ōne; Cast: Takeru Satoh, Ryunosuke Kamiki, Nana Komatsu, Shōta Sometani, Kenta Kiritani | Based on a manga. | Drama, Youth | |
| O C T O B E R | 2 | The Empire of Corpses | Director: Ryoutaro Makihara; Cast: Yoshimasa Hosoya, Ayumu Murase, Kana Hanazawa, Taiten Kusunoki | Based on a novel. | Horror, Mystery | |
| O C T O B E R | 10 | Library Wars: The Last Mission | Director: Shinsuke Sato; Cast: Junichi Okada, Nana Eikura, Kei Tanaka, Sota Fukushi | Based on a manga. | Drama, Action, Sci-fi | |
| O C T O B E R | 10 | Gamba and Friends | Director: Tomohiro Kawamura, Yoshihiro Komori; Cast: Yūki Kaji, Yasuhiro Takato, Wataru Takagi, Akiko Yajima | Based on a novel. | Fantasy | |
| O C T O B E R | 17 | Her Senior | Director: Chihiro Ikeda; Cast: Jun Shison, Kyoko Yoshine, Riria Kojima, Junki Tozuka, Kaho Mizutani | Based on a manga. | Drama, Romance | |
| O C T O B E R | 23 | Fly Out, PriPara: Aim for it with Everyone! Idol☆Grand Prix | Director: Masakazu Hishida, Nobutaka Yoda; Cast: Himika Akaneya, Yū Serizawa, Miyu Kubota, Saki Yamakita, Azuki Shibuya | Based on a manga. | Musical | |
| O C T O B E R | 24 | Galaxy Turnpike | Director: Kōki Mitani; Cast: Shingo Katori, Haruka Ayase, Shun Oguri, Yuka | Based on a novel. | Comedy, Sci-fi | |
| O C T O B E R | 31 | My Love Story! | Director: Hayato Kawai; Cast: Ryohei Suzuki, Mei Nagano, Kentaro Sakaguchi, Yasufumi Terawaki | Based on a manga. | Comedy, Romance | |
| N O V E M B E R | 7 | Grasshopper | Director: Tomoyuki Takimoto; Cast: Toma Ikuta, Tadanobu Asano, Ryosuke Yamada, Haru | Based on a novel. | Mystery, Thriller | |
| N O V E M B E R | 7 | MOZU | Director: Eiichirō Hasumi; Cast: Hidetoshi Nishijima, Teruyuki Kagawa, Yoko Maki, Sosuke Ikematsu, Atsushi Itō (actor) | Based on a television series. | Action, Crime | |
| N O V E M B E R | 7 | Terminal | Director: Tetsuo Shinohara; Cast: Koichi Sato, Tsubasa Honda, Nakamura Shidō II, Masato Wada | Based on a novel. | Drama | |
| N O V E M B E R | 13 | Harmony | Director: Michael Arias, Takashi Nakamura; Cast: Miyuki Sawashiro, Reina Ueda, Aya Suzaki, Yoshiko Sakakibara | Based on a novel. | Science fantasy | |
| N O V E M B E R | 13 | Three Stories of Love | Director: Ryōsuke Hashiguchi; Cast: Atsushi Shinohara, Tōko Narushima, Ryō Ikeda, Tamae Andō, Daisuke Kuroda | Based on a novel. | Drama | |
| N O V E M B E R | 13 | Fw:Hamatora | Director: Seiji Kishi; Cast: Ryōta Ōsaka, Wataru Hatano, Emiri Katō, Jun Fukuyama, Yuichi Nakamura | Based on a manga. | Mystery, Youth | |
| N O V E M B E R | 21 | Digimon Adventure tri. Series | Director: Keitaro Motonaga; Cast: Natsuki Hanae, Yoshimasa Hosoya, Suzuko Mimori, Mutsumi Tamura | Based on an anime series. | Fantasy, Action | |
| N O V E M B E R | 22 | Ghost Theater | Director: Hideo Nakata; Cast: Haruka Shimazaki, Mantaro Koichi, Rika Adachi, Daiichi Watanabe | Based on a 1996 film. | Horror | |
| N O V E M B E R | 22 | World of Delight | Director: Yoshishige Miyake; Cast: Yuta Tamamori, Mariya Nishiuchi, Kanna Mori, George Abe, Shigenori Yamazaki | Based on a novel. | Drama, Youth | |
| N O V E M B E R | 22 | Girls und Panzer der Film | Director: Tsutomu Mizushima; Cast: Mai Fuchigami, Ai Kayano, Mami Ozaki, Ikumi Nakagami, Yuka Iguchi | Based on a manga. | Action | |
| D E C E M B E R | 5 | 125 Years Memory | Director: Mitsutoshi Tanaka; Cast: Seiyō Uchino, Kenan Ece, Shiori Kutsuna, Alican Yücesoy, Yui Natsukawa | Based on a novel. | Historical, Drama | |
| D E C E M B E R | 5 | High Speed! Free! Starting Days | Director: Yasuhiro Takemoto; Cast: Nobunaga Shimazaki, Tatsuhisa Suzuki, Toshiyuki Toyonaga, Kōki Uchiyama, Mamoru Miyano | Based on an anime | Youth, Sports | |
| D E C E M B E R | 5 | Persona Non Grata | Director: Cellin Gluck; Cast: Toshiaki Karasawa, Koyuki, Borys Szyc, Agnieszka Grochowska, Fumiyo Kohinata | Based on a novel. | Historical, Drama | |
| D E C E M B E R | 12 | Orange | Director: Kōjirō Hashimoto; Cast: Tao Tsuchiya, Kento Yamazaki, Ryo Ryusei, Hirona Yamazaki, Dori Sakurada | Based on a manga. | Romance, Youth | |
| D E C E M B E R | 12 | Nagasaki: Memories of My Son | Director: Yoji Yamada; Cast: Sayuri Yoshinaga, Kazunari Ninomiya, Haru Kuroki, Kenichi Kato | Based on a novel. | Historical | |
| D E C E M B E R | 19 | Yo-kai Watch the Movie 2 | Director: Shigeharu Takahashi, Shinji Ushiro; Cast: Haruka Tomatsu, Tomokazu Seki, Etsuko Kozakura, Romi Park, Yūki Kaji | Based on a video game. | Fantasy, Action | |
| D E C E M B E R | 23 | Chibi Maruko-chan: A Boy from Italy | Director: James Takagi; Cast: Tarako, Yusaku Yara, Teiyū Ichiryūsai, Yūko Mizutani | Based on a manga. | Comedy | |

== See also ==
- 2015 in Japan
- 2015 in Japanese television
- List of 2015 box office number-one films in Japan
