= Koisenu Futari =

- Key visual
- 恋せぬふたり
- Written by: Erika Yoshida
- Directed by: Yudai Noguchi; Yuta Oshida; Shohei Doi
- Starring: Yukino Kishii; Issei Takahashi
- Music by: Umitaro Abe
- Country of origin: Japan
- Original language: Japanese
- No. of episodes: 8 (list of episodes)

Original release
- Network: NHK
- Release: 10 January – 21 March 2022

Koisenu Futari (恋せぬふたり) is a 2022 Japanese television drama series starring Yukino Kishii and Issey Takahashi. The series revolves around the relationship of two aromantic asexual people.

== Cast ==
- Yukino Kishii as Sakuko Kodama
- Issey Takahashi as Satoru Takahashi
- Shogo Hama as Matsuoka Hajime
- Fujiko Kojima as Chizuru Kadowaki
- Akiko Kikuchi as Haruka Inozuka
- Kana Kita as Minori Ishikawa
- Hidenobu Abera as Daisuke Ishikawa
- Naomi Nishida as Sakura Kodama
- Mantaro Koichi as Hiromi Kodama

== Production ==
Koisenu Futari was produced under NHK and had three directors; Yudai Noguchi (episodes 2, 5, and 8), Yuta Oshida (episodes 1, 4, and 7), and Shohei Doi (episodes 3 and 6).

=== Development ===
Co-director Yuta Oshida came up with the idea for the story of Koisenu Futari after coming to the realization that Japanese television dramas often include romantic relationships and elements. This led to him learning about asexuality, with his research including interviewing asexual people. NHK staffers initially expressed skepticism when he pitched the show in May 2021, but ultimately they agreed that the show could work despite the lack of public knowledge about aromanticism and asexuality.

=== Music ===
Umitaro Abe provided the musical score for Koisenu Futari. The theme song for the television series "Marugoto" (まるごと; "Whole") by the pop band Chai.

== Broadcast ==
Koisenu Futari premiered on NHK on 10 January 2022. It had eight episodes, with the last episode broadcast on 21 March 2022.

== Episodes ==
No.	Directed by	Original release date
1	Yuta Oshida	10 January 2022
2	Yudai Noguchi	17 January 2022
3	Shohei Doi	24 January 2022
4	Yuta Oshida	31 January 2022
5	Yudai Noguchi	21 February 2022
6	Shohei Doi	28 February 2022
7	Yuta Oshida	14 March 2022
8	Yudai Noguchi	21 March 2022
