= Eiji Akaso =

Japanese actor and model (born 1994)

- 赤楚 衛二
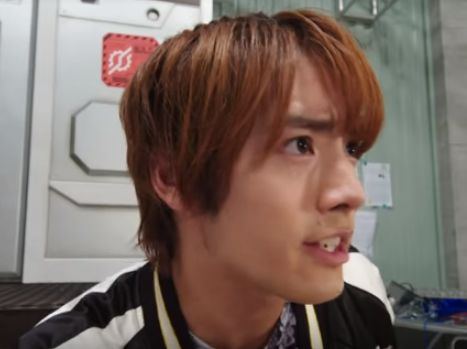
- Akaso in a promotional episode of Kamen Rider Build (2018)
- Born: 1 March 1994 (age 32); Moriguchi, Osaka, Japan
- Other name: Mamoru Akaso (former stage name)
- Occupations: Actor; model
- Hometown: Nagoya, Aichi Prefecture
- Years active: 2010–present
- Agent: Tristone Entertainment
- Notable work: Kamen Rider Build; Cherry Magic! Thirty Years of Virginity Can Make You a Wizard?!; Hey Sensei, Don't You Know?; Love Me, Love Me Not
- Height: 178 cm (5 ft 10 in)

Eiji Akaso (赤楚 衛二, Akaso Eiji; born March 1, 1994, in Osaka Prefecture) is a Japanese actor and model, known for playing Ryuga Banjou in Kamen Rider Build. He is represented by Tristone Entertainment.

== Biography ==
Akaso was born in Moriguchi City, Osaka Prefecture, but due to his father's work, Eiji briefly lived in Wisconsin, USA, at ages one to four. After that, his family relocated back to Japan, and he grew up in Nagoya, Aichi Prefecture. His father, Haruyuki Akaso, graduated from the University of Wisconsin-Madison and was a professor at the Faculty of Foreign Studies (Linguistic Department) at Nagoya Gakuin University and became the president of the said university in April 2020. His mother is a piano teacher. He has a younger brother, who is four years younger and is studying film production at Osaka University of Arts. In addition, his family's surname, "Akaso," is rare, with only about 200 people nationwide, and is said to have been bestowed by Toyotomi Hideyoshi on a swordsmith.

He was strongly influenced by his academic and artistic parents. He started playing piano at the age of three until Junior High School. He graduated from Toho High School, a private school, in Nagoya. After high school, Eiji majored in English at the same university, but later dropped out to move to Tokyo. His desire to become an actor sprouted in middle school and was also influenced by the habit of his family of having a movie night once a month. At the age of 19 or 20, he went to Tokyo and auditioned for a year. The trigger that lead Eiji to drop out of university and to enter the world of entertainment was a call from the CEO of his current agency in 2014. At that time, he was still in university and he had to make the decision either to start then or after graduation at the age of 23. He made a "now or never" decision and dropped out of university to join Tristone Entertainment.

=== Health ===
In 2019, Akaso revealed in a variety show that he had been diagnosed to be allergic to approximately 52 foods, saying, "I'm allergic to fruit, and I can't eat rice either..."

== Career ==
Eiji was affiliated with the Nagoya model office "FORM JAPAN" when he was in his teens. He was active as a model and talent under the name Mamoru Akaso (赤楚 衛, Akaso Mamoru). In 2010, he joined the local idol group "Boys and Men" in Nagoya, working on stage performances and regular appearances of variety shows. (Note: From the latter half of 2011, he said that he was "on holiday" on the official website, and later withdrew. There was no official announcement on his withdrawal.) Eiji is said to have left BOYS AND MEN in 2011. Originally, he entered the entertainment agency because he wanted to be an actor and not an idol.

Eiji won the Grand Prix at the men's model audition of Samantha Thavasa in 2013, which became the turning point for him to audition in Tokyo at the age of 19. In 2015, he transferred to his current agency Tristone Entertainment, working as an actor and starring in television dramas and films in his current stage name.

== Filmography ==
=== Films ===
Year	Title	Role	Notes	Ref.
2015	No Longer Heroine			
2015	Tsūgaku Series: Tsūgaku Densha/Tsūgaku Tochū	Kyosuke		
2016	Scoop!			
2017	Closest Love to Heaven			
2017	Kamen Rider Heisei Generations Final: Build & Ex-Aid with Legend Rider	Ryuga Banjo/Kamen Rider Cross-Z		
2018	Kamen Rider Build the Movie: Be the One	Ryuga Banjo/Kamen Rider Cross-Z		
2018	Kamen Rider Heisei Generations Forever	Ryuga Banjo/Kamen Rider Cross-Z		
2020	Love Me, Love Me Not	Kazuomi Inui	Lead role	
2020	Love Me, Love Me Not: The Animation	A student (voice)	Cameo	
2020	Keep Your Hands Off Eizouken!	Kobayashi		
2021	The Great Yokai War: Guardians	Amanojaku		
2022	The Sunday Runoff	Yūki Iwabuchi		
2022	Cherry Magic! the Movie	Kiyoshi Adachi	Lead role	
2023	Zom 100: Bucket List of the Dead	Akira Tendo	Lead role	
2024	What If Shogun Ieyasu Tokugawa Was to Become the Prime Minister	Sakamoto Ryōma		
2024	6 Lying University Students	Shogo Hatano		
2025	366 Days	Minato Makiya	Lead role	
2025	Kinki	Yūsei Ozawa	Lead role	
2026	Kyojo: Reunion	Junji Urihara		
2026	One Year to Live, Buy a Man	Yoshitaka Sena	Lead role	
2026	Tokyo MER: Mobile Emergency Room – Capital Crisis	Haru Ohgi		
2027	Okinawa Confidential	Yuta Sorimachi	Lead role	

=== Television ===
Year	Title	Role	Notes	Ref.
2015	High School Chorus	Sho Ishikawa		
2015	AKB Horror Night: Adrenalin no Yoru		Episode 16	
2016	Never Let Me Go		Episode 2	
2016	Tokyo Women's Guidebook	Kōhei		
2016	Watashi ni Unmei no Koi nante arienai tte Omotteta		TV movie	
2017	Frankenstein's Love		Episode 1	
2017	Samurai Gourmet	Actor	Episode 5	
2017	Kamen Rider Amazons	Hiroki Nagase	Season 2	
2017–18	Kamen Rider Build	Ryuga Banjo/Kamen Rider Cross-Z	Lead role	
2018	Kamen Rider Zi-O	Ryuga Banjo/Kamen Rider Cross-Z	Episodes 1-2	
2019	Innocence, Fight Against False Charges	Tokudori Isawa		
2019	I Shared my Husband	Hideaki Matsuda		
2019	Hey Sensei, Don't You Know?	Riichi Kido	Lead role	
2020	Keep Your Hands Off Eizouken!	Kobayashi		
2020	Gourmet Detective Goro Akechi	Nonaka	Episode 3	
2020	Detective Yuri Rintaro	Shota Satsuki	Episode 2	
2020	Cherry Magic! Thirty Years of Virginity Can Make You a Wizard?!	Kiyoshi Adachi	Lead role	
2021	Cold Case Season 3	Yōsuke Hirayama	Episode 6	
2021	Date My Daughter	Yuto		
2021	Super Rich	Yu Haruno		
2022	Hiru	Yūki Shinomiya	Lead role	
2022	Ishiko and Haneo: You're Suing Me?	Ao Ōba		
2022–23	Maiagare!	Takashi Umezu	Asadora	
2023	Kazama Kimichika: Kyojo Zero	Junji Urihara		
2023	Pending Train	Yūto Shirahama		
2023	Turn to Me Mukai-kun	Satoru Mukai	Lead role	
2025	Inheritance Detective	Nao Haie	Lead role	
2026	Gimbap and Onigiri	Taiga Hase	Lead role	

=== Stage ===
Years	Title	Role	Ref.
2010–11	Straight Drive!		
2013	Asu	Scanda	
2016	Kuroko's Basketball	Ryo Sakurai	
2016	Roshutsukurū		

=== Music video appearances ===
Years	Title	Artist	Ref.
2019	"Masquerade"	SHE'S	
2019	"Letter"	SHE'S	
2019	"Your Song"	SHE'S	

=== Radio dramas ===
Date	Title	Role	Network	Ref.
Feb 2017	Saturday Drama House Binanshi Gekijō "Ma no tsubuyaki"	Ryo Okada	JFN	

=== Modelling ===
Years	Title	Notes	Ref.
2010	Imuraya Confectionery "Nikuman Anman"	Advertisement model	
2011	Aoki	Advertisement model	
2013–	Samantha Thavasa	Men's model	
2020	KANGOL REWARD	Collaboration x AM	
2021	A BATHING APE® 2021 SPRING collection	Advertisement model	
2021	Disney Pixar 'Toy Story' x Yohji Yamamoto Ground Y	Advertisement model	

== Awards and nominations ==
Year presented, name of the award ceremony, category, nominee(s) of the award, and the result of the nomination
Year	Award ceremony	Category	Nominated work(s)	Result	Ref.
2021	WEIBO Account Festival in Tokyo 2020	Popular Actor (Hot Topic Actor)	Cherry Magic! Thirty Years of Virginity Can Make You a Wizard?!	Won	
2021	LINE NEWS AWARDS 2021	Next News Award	Actor Category	Won	
2025	48th Japan Academy Film Prize	Newcomer of the Year	What If Shogun Ieyasu Tokugawa Was to Become the Prime Minister and 6 Lying University Students	Won	
