= 10Dance =

2025 Japanese film

- Release poster
- Japanese: テンダンス
- Directed by: Keishi Ōtomo
- Screenplay by: Tomoko Yoshida; Keishi Ōtomo
- Based on: 10Dance by Inouesatoh
- Produced by: Takako Miauchi; Kota Ishizuka
- Starring: Ryoma Takeuchi; Keita Machida; Shiori Doi; Anna Ishii
- Production company: Episcope
- Distributed by: Netflix
- Release date: December 18, 2025
- Running time: 126 minutes
- Country: Japan
- Language: Japanese

10Dance (Japanese: テンダンス, Hepburn: Tendansu) is a 2025 Japanese boys' love film, based on the manga of the same name by Inouesatoh, directed by Keishi Ōtomo, starring Ryoma Takeuchi and Keita Machida. The film was released on Netflix on December 18, 2025. In the first week of its release, 10Dance became the 4th most watched non-English film on the platform, with 2,6 million views. The movie was partially filmed in Blackpool, United Kingdom.

== Plot ==
Shinya Sugiki is a talented ballroom dance champion in standard dances, while his namesake, Shinya Suzuki is a Latin dance champion in Japan. The two consider each other rivals, but surprisingly, Sugiki asks Suzuki that the two pairs train together to learn from each other, in preparation for the international 10Dance competition, where both the five standard and five Latin dances need to be performed by the contestants. During their steamy practice sessions, the two men begin to fall in love.

== Cast ==
- Ryoma Takeuchi as Shinya Suzuki, Latin dance champion
- Keita Machida as Shinya Sugiki, standard dance champion
- Shiori Doi as Aki Tajima, Suzuki's dance partner
- Anna Ishii as Fusako Yagami, Sugiki's dance partner
- Shinya Hamada
- Oshiro Maeda
- Nadiya Bychkova as Liana
- Susie Trayling as Martha Milton
- Pasquale La Rocca as Giulio

== Release ==
10Dance debuted exclusively on Netflix on December 18, 2025, as part of the streaming platform's push to adapt Japanese manga for global audiences. In its first week of release, the film became one of the most-watched non-English titles on Netflix, drawing significant viewership worldwide.

== Accolades ==
Awards and nominations received by 10Dance
Award	Year	Category	Nominee(s)	Result	Ref.
GLAAD Media Awards	2026	GLAAD Media Award for Outstanding Film –Streaming or TV	10Dance	Nominated	
