= Erika Yoshida =

Japanese screenwriter and novelist (born 1987)

- 吉田 恵里香
- Born: 21 November 1987 (age 38)
- Occupations: Screenwriter; novelist
- Years active: 2011–present
- Notable work: Cherry Magic! Thirty Years of Virginity Can Make You a Wizard?!; Tower of God; Bocchi the Rock!; Koisenu Futari; The Tiger and Her Wings
- Children: 1
- Awards: Kuniko Mukōda Award (2022)

Erika Yoshida (吉田 恵里香, Yoshida Erika; born 21 November 1987) is a Japanese screenwriter and novelist affiliated with Queen-B. Becoming an assistant to Masafumi Nishida as a student, she began serving as head writer for several television series, including Boys Over Flowers Season 2 (2017), Cherry Magic! Thirty Years of Virginity Can Make You a Wizard?! (2020), Tower of God (2020-2024), Bocchi the Rock! (2022), I Will Be Your Bloom (2023), and the asadora drama The Tiger and Her Wings (2024). She also won the Kuniko Mukōda Award as screenwriter for Koisenu Futari (2022).

== Biography ==
=== Early life and education ===
Erika Yoshida, a native of Kanagawa Prefecture, was born on 21 November 1987. She graduated from both Nihon University Senior & Junior High School and the Nihon University College of Art (Nichigei)'s Department of Literature.

Yoshida originally planned to be a mangaka while in junior high school, and with that aspiration in mind even chose a school with an arts department, but eventually decided against it. Her next aspiration was to become a novelist, and she picked Nichigei's Department of Literature to receive guidance on that career path. During her student years, she learned that Masafumi Nishida was looking for an assistant, and began her career as a screenwriter under that position.

=== Screenwriting career ===
Yoshida wrote the screenplay for Koisuru Eve, an NTV drama special which aired on Christmas Eve 2013; this was her debut as a drama screenwriter. She subsequently wrote screenplays for several dramas, namely Dansui! (2017), Boys Over Flowers Season 2 (2017), Heaven? (2019), Dasada (2020), Cherry Magic! Thirty Years of Virginity Can Make You a Wizard?! (2020), and Koeharu! (2021).

Yoshida was writer for the 2022 drama Koisenu Futari, for which she won the 40th Kuniko Mukōda Award. She wrote the screenplays for Double and I Will Be Your Bloom, which both aired that same year, and she was screenwriter for the 2023 NHK special drama Menstrual Uncle and His Daughter. She served as screenwriter for the 2024 asadora drama The Tiger and Her Wings, as well as its 2026 special drama spinoff Yamada Todoroki Hōritsu Jimusho. In September 2026, it was announced that she would be the screenwriter for Amazon Prime Video's live-action adaptation of The Apothecary Diaries.

Yoshida's first anime work was in the 2011 television series Tiger & Bunny. She subsequently was the head writer for Trickster (2016), Namu Amida Butsu! Rendai Utena (2019), and the first season of Tower of God (2020). She later became the 2022 anime adaptation for the manga Bocchi the Rock!; she won the 9th Anime Trending Anime of the Year Award for Best in Adapted Screenplay for her work on the anime. She later returned to work for Tower of God as the second season's series composition writer, a position she later held for the 2025 anime Maebashi Witches; Reiichi Naruma of Real Sound called the latter an example of a growing trend of drama screenwriters providing series composition for original anime.

Yoshida is also a film screenwriter, with her work including No Longer Heroine (2015), Love and Lies (2017), Leon (2018), Even: Song for You (2018), Sensei Kunshu (2018), Oz Land (2018), xxxHolic (2022), and Otonanajimi (2023).

=== Novels, manga, and other works ===
Yoshida is also a novelist, with such work originally written for teenage audiences. She wrote a novelization of Reruriri's Vocaloid song "Nou Shou Sakuretsu Girl"; she had landed the job after having a class where Hatsune Miku was discussed. She was also the writer for the song's film and manga adaptations. Her novels also include adaptations of the NHK drama Jikken Kenji Totori and of Koisenu Futari. Following her writing of the Koisenu Futari novelization, she has announced plans to write another novel.

In May 2020, she wrote Okaeri, a one-shot romance manga in Weekly Young Jump illustrated by Masakazu Katsura. She also wrote both Tiger & Bunny: The Comic and Tiger & Bunny 2: The Comic.

Yoshida served as a guest judge at the 75th NHK Kōhaku Uta Gassen in December 2024. In 2025, she received a Kanagawa Cultural Award for the Future for her work in novels and screenwriting, as well as the 19th Nichigei Prize.

=== Themes and personal life ===
According to Naruma, Yoshida is "skilled at weaving social themes into her stories". In an interview, Yoshida said that she was approached by NHK to work on Koisenu Futari, which is about an aromantic/asexual couple, after depicting a similar character in the Cherry Magic! drama. When asked about whether she finds novels or screenplays an easier medium to write on, she replied: "Neither comes easily (laughs). I love writing stories, but I struggle and agonize over both forms." She cites Kuniko Mukōda and Hiromi Kawakami as inspirations, and cites Yoshikazu Okada, Yuji Sakamoto, and Aya Watanabe as screenwriters she admires.

Yoshida has been affiliated with Queen-B since she was in university. She has a Japanese language teacher's license. She has a son who was born in 2019 or 2020.

== Filmography ==
=== Television dramas ===
Year	Title	Notes	Ref.
2013	Koisuru Eve	Screenplay	
2017	Dansui!	Screenplay	
2017	Boys Over Flowers Season 2	Screenplay	
2019	Heaven?	Screenplay	
2020	Dasada	Screenplay	
2020	Cherry Magic! Thirty Years of Virginity Can Make You a Wizard?!	Screenplay	
2021	Koeharu!	Screenplay	
2022	Koisenu Futari	Screenplay	
2022	Double	Screenplay	
2022	I Will Be Your Bloom	Screenplay	
2023	Menstrual Uncle and His Daughter	Screenplay	
2024	The Tiger and Her Wings	Screenplay	
2026	Yamada Todoroki Hōritsu Jimusho	Screenplay	
2026	Cut, Dad! Are We the "Best" Family?	Screenplay	

=== Web drama ===
Year	Title	Notes	Ref.
2019	Parallel School Days	Screenplay	
2019	Follow sareta Owari	Screenplay	
2021	Black Cinderella	Screenplay	
2021	A Devil and Her Love Song	Screenplay	
2028	The Apothecary Diaries	Screenplay	

=== Television animation ===
Year	Title	Notes	Ref.
2016	Trickster	Series composition	
2019	Namu Amida Butsu! Rendai Utena	Series composition	
2020-2024	Tower of God	Series composition	
2022	Bocchi the Rock!	Series composition	
2025	Maebashi Witches	Series composition	

=== Animated film ===
Year	Title	Notes	Ref.
2020	Love Me, Love Me Not	Screenplay	
2027	Eiga Bocchi the Rock! Hoshi no Ashiato	Screenplay	

=== Original net animation ===
Year	Title	Notes	Ref.
2021	Artiswitch	Series composition, screenplay	

=== Live action films ===
Year	Title	Notes	Ref.
2015	Noushou Sakuretsu Girl	Original story, screenplay	
2015	No Longer Heroine	Screenplay	
2017	Love and Lies	Screenplay	
2018	Leon	Screenplay	
2018	Even: Song for You	Screenplay	
2018	Sensei Kunshu	Screenplay	
2018	Oz Land	Screenplay	
2022	xxxHolic	Screenplay	
2023	Otonanajimi	Screenplay	
2026	Your Story	Screenplay	
