= My Special One =

Japanese manga series

- First tankōbon volume cover

君がトクベツ (Kimi ga Tokubetsu)
- Genre: Romantic comedy
- Manga
- Written by: Momoko Kōda
- Published by: Shueisha
- English publisher: NA: Viz Media
- Imprint: Margaret Comics
- Magazine: Bessatsu Margaret
- Original run: March 13, 2019 – January 10, 2025
- Volumes: 11
- Live-action film
- Directed by: Ayato Matsuda
- Written by: Satoko Okazaki
- Released: June 20, 2025
- Runtime: 102 minutes
- Television drama
- Directed by: Atsuya Asano; Hidemitsu Miyamoto
- Written by: Satoko Okazaki; Sachi Kirino
- Original network: MBS, TBS
- Original run: September 16, 2025 – November 12, 2025
- Episodes: 9

My Special One (君がトクベツ, Kimi ga Tokubetsu) is a Japanese manga series written and illustrated by Momoko Kōda. It was serialized in Shueisha's shōjo manga magazine Bessatsu Margaret from March 2019 to January 2025. A live-action film adaptation premiered in Japanese theaters in June 2025. A television drama sequel aired from September to November 2025.

== Synopsis ==
After a humiliating rejection, Sahoko has sworn to never fall in love with attractive men again. That is, until she meets the idol Kouta Kirigaya who visits her family restaurant. Sahoko is initially cold to Kouta, owing to her previous vow, but gradually warms up to him.

== Characters ==
Sahoko Wakaume (若梅さほ子, Wakaume Sahoko)
Portrayed by: Mei Hata
Kouta Kirigaya (桐ヶ谷皇太, Kōta Kirigaya)
Portrayed by: Kazuya Ōhashi
Emika Nanase (七瀬えみか, Nanase Emika)
Portrayed by: Nako Yabuki
SHO
Portrayed by: Taiki Sato
Kanato Asuma (遊馬叶翔, Asuma Kanato)
Portrayed by: Keito Kimura
Haru Kurusu (来栖晴, Kurusu Haru)
Portrayed by: Jūtarō Yamanaka
Yū Haruna (榛名優生, Haruna Yū)
Portrayed by: Naru Ōkubo
Itsuki Naruse (成瀬一生, Naruse Itsuki)
Portrayed by: Naoya Kida

== Media ==
=== Manga ===
Written and illustrated by Momoko Kōda, My Special One was serialized in Shueisha's shōjo manga magazine Bessatsu Margaret from March 13, 2019, to January 10, 2025. Its chapters were compiled into eleven tankōbon volumes released from July 25, 2019, to May 23, 2025.

In June 2022, Viz Media announced that they had licensed the series for English publication.

| No. | Original release date | Original ISBN | North American release date | North American ISBN |
|---|---|---|---|---|
| 1 | July 25, 2019 | 978-4-08-844225-9 | February 7, 2023 | 978-1-9747-3670-6 |
Chapters 1–4
| 2 | November 25, 2019 | 978-4-08-844266-2 | May 2, 2023 | 978-1-9747-3691-1 |
Chapters 5–8
| 3 | March 25, 2020 | 978-4-08-844316-4 | August 1, 2023 | 978-1-9747-3777-2 |
Chapters 9–12
| 4 | July 22, 2020 | 978-4-08-844362-1 | November 7, 2023 | 978-1-9747-4128-1 |
Chapters 13–16
| 5 | November 25, 2020 | 978-4-08-844386-7 | February 6, 2024 | 978-1-9747-4306-3 |
Chapters 17–20
| 6 | March 25, 2021 | 978-4-08-844477-2 | May 7, 2024 | 978-1-9747-4564-7 |
Chapters 21–24
| 7 | July 21, 2021 | 978-4-08-844503-8 | August 6, 2024 | 978-1-9747-4632-3 |
Chapters 25–28
| 8 | November 25, 2021 | 978-4-08-844542-7 | November 5, 2024 | 978-1-9747-4933-1 |
Chapters 29–32
| 9 | April 25, 2022 | 978-4-08-844605-9 | March 4, 2025 | 978-1-9747-5191-4 |
Chapters 33–36
| 10 | August 25, 2022 | 978-4-08-844693-6 | July 1, 2025 | 978-1-9747-5486-1 |
Chapters 37–40
| 11 | May 23, 2025 | 978-4-08-844706-3 | May 5, 2026 | 978-1-9747-6566-9 |
Chapters 41–44; Side story: Atashi no!

=== Live-action film ===
A live-action film adaptation was announced on February 6, 2025. The film is directed by Ayato Matsuda, with a screenplay written by Satoko Okazaki. It premiered in Japanese theaters on June 20, 2025.

=== Drama ===
A television drama sequel to the film was announced on July 3, 2025. The series is directed by Ayato Matsuda and Hidemitsu Miyamoto, with a screenplay written by Satoko Okazaki and Sachi Kirino. The cast from the film reprised their roles. It aired nine episodes on MBS and TBS from September 16 to November 12, 2025.

== Reception ==
The series' first volume was listed in the Young Adult Library Services Association's "Great Graphic Novels for Teens" list in 2024.

== See also ==
- No Longer Heroine, another manga series by the same author
- Sensei Kunshu, another manga series by the same author
