= Sensei Kunshu =

Japanese manga series

- Cover of the Japanese version of volume 1, first released on November 25, 2013

センセイ君主
- Genre: Romantic comedy
- Manga
- Written by: Momoko Kōda
- Published by: Shueisha
- Imprint: Margaret Comics
- Magazine: Bessatsu Margaret
- Original run: July 13, 2013 – June 13, 2017
- Volumes: 13
- Live-action film
- Directed by: Sho Tsukikawa
- Written by: Erika Yoshida
- Released: August 1, 2018
- Runtime: 105 minutes

Sensei Kunshu (Japanese: センセイ君主; lit. "Teacher Monarch", alternatively titled My Teacher, My Love internationally for the live-action film) is a Japanese manga series by Momoko Kōda. Sensei Kunshu was serialized in the monthly shōjo manga magazine Bessatsu Margaret from July 13, 2013, to June 13, 2017. A live-action film adaptation of the same name was released on August 1, 2018.

== Plot ==
Ayuha Samaru, a straightforward, hard-working high school student, falls in love with Yoshitaka Hiromitsu, who helps her out one day at a restaurant. The next day, she discovers that Mr. Hiromitsu is a new substitute teacher filling in for her homeroom teacher at school. Ayuha believes that she and Mr. Hiromitsu are destined to become lovers and decides to pursue him romantically.

== Characters ==
Ayuha Samaru (佐丸 あゆは, Samaru Ayuha)
Voiced by: Rumi Okubo (vomic); portrayed by: Minami Hamabe (film)
Yoshitaka Hiromitsu (弘光 由貴, Hiromitsu Yoshitaka)
Voiced by: Junichi Suwabe (vomic); portrayed by: Ryoma Takeuchi (film)
Mr. Hiromitsu is the older brother of Kosuke Hiromitsu, a character from Kouda's previous work, No Longer Heroine.
Kotake Sawada (澤田 虎竹, Sawada Kotake)
Voiced by: Atsushi Abe (vomic); portrayed by: Taiki Sato (film)

== Media ==
=== Manga ===
Sensei Kunshu is written and illustrated by Momoko Kōda. It was serialized in the monthly shōjo manga magazine Bessatsu Margaret from the June 2013 issue released on July 13, 2013 to the May 2017 issue released on June 13, 2017. The chapters were later released in 13 bound volumes by Shueisha under the Margaret Comics imprint.

During the series' run, Shueisha released a vomic (voice comic) starring Rumi Okubo and Junichi Suwabe.

| No. | Japanese release date | Japanese ISBN |
|---|---|---|
| 1 | November 25, 2013 | 978-4-08-845133-6 |
| 2 | March 25, 2014 | 978-4-08-845183-1 |
| 3 | July 25, 2014 | 978-4-08-845242-5 |
| 4 | November 25, 2014 | 978-4-08-845303-3 |
| 5 | March 25, 2015 | 978-4-08-845363-7 |
| 6 | June 25, 2015 | 978-4-08-845403-0 |
| 7 | September 11, 2015 | 978-4-08-845449-8 |
| 8 | December 25, 2015 | 978-4-08-845501-3 |
| 9 | April 25, 2016 | 978-4-08-845556-3 |
| 10 | August 25, 2016 | 978-4-08-845624-9 |
| 11 | December 22, 2016 | 978-4-08-845684-3 |
| 12 | April 25, 2017 | 978-4-08-845746-8 |
| 13 | August 25, 2017 | 978-4-08-845133-6 |

=== Film ===
In January 2018, Bessatsu Margaret announced that a live-action film adaptation was green-lit, with a release date of August 1, 2018, later revealed in April of that year. The film is directed by Sho Tsukikawa and written by Erika Yoshida, and stars Minami Hamabe as Ayuha and Ryoma Takeuchi as Mr. Hiromitsu. Exile and Fantastics member Taiki Sato, Rina Kawaei, Yua Shinkawa, and Riko Fukumoto were announced as additional cast members in March 2017. The film's theme song is a cover of "I Want You Back" performed by Twice. A second version of the music video featuring the cast of the film dancing with Twice was released on June 26, 2018. The film is also titled My Teacher, My Love for international markets.

The Blu-ray deluxe edition sold a cumulative total of 3,097 copies in its first week and debuted at #15 on the Oricon Weekly Blu-ray Charts. The DVD deluxe edition sold a cumulative total of 2,695 copies in its first week and debuted at #11 on the Oricon Weekly DVD Charts, while the regular edition debuted at #29 and sold 1,389 copies.

== Reception ==
For the live-action film adaptation, Mark Schilling from The Japan Times gave the film 2 out of 5 stars, stating his discomfort at Ayuha and Mr. Hiromitsu's relationship as student and teacher. In his review, he noted that student-teacher romances with dim-witted heroines were still vastly common in Japan compared to the West. He also stated that Ayuha's character was far more realistic in the manga than the film.

== See also ==
- My Special One, another manga series by Momoko Kōda.
- No Longer Heroine, another manga series by Momoko Kōda.
