= Akiko Kikuchi =

Japanese model and actress (born 1982)

- 菊池 亜希子
- Born: August 26, 1982 (age 44); Ōno, Ibi District, Gifu, Japan
- Occupations: Model, actress

Akiko Kikuchi (菊池 亜希子, Kikuchi Akiko; born August 26, 1982, in Ōno, Ibi District, Gifu, Japan) is a Japanese model and actress who is represented by the talent agency Ten Carat.

== Biography ==
Kikuchi graduated from Chiba University's Faculty of Engineering of Urban Environment Systems Department. Her bachelor's degree is engineering. Kikuchi was active in many magazines like Linen. She appeared in magazines Non-no and Pretty Style in the past. Kikuchi was serialized in PS Akiko Kikuchi no Michikusa. In 2006, she was appointed to the supporters of the link affiliate site, Share Shogakukan Joint Charity. In addition to starring in films and television dramas, Kikuchi appeared in advertisements often. She has a reputation for illustrations and fashion style that had a unique view of the world.

== Filmography ==
=== TV series ===
Year	Title	Role	Notes	Ref.
2007	Good Job〜Good Job		Episode 1	
2007	Torihada〜Yofukashi no Anata ni Zokutto Suru Hanashi o			
2008	Koizora	Saori Tahara		
2010	Clone Baby	Akiko Higuchi		
2011	Tōi Hi no Yukue	Mizuki Hirose		
2012	Snark Kari	Mika Kurosawa		
2012	Hana no Zubora-Meshi	Mizuki		
2014	Yōjū Mameshiba Bōkyō-hen	Sachiko Suzuki	Episodes 2 and 3	
2015	Mondai no Aru Restaurant	Satsuki Fujimura	Episodes 1, 7-9	
2023	A Day-Off of Hana Sugisaki	Takeda	Episode 3	
2024	1122: For a Happy Marriage	Tōko Aihara		
2026	Sins of Kujo	Tomoko Ichida		
2026	The Scent of the Wind	Kiyo Izumi	Asadora	

=== Films ===
Year	Title	Role	Notes	Ref.
2008	All Around Us	Eiko Kajiyama		
2010	The Days of Morisaki Bookstore	Takako Miura	Lead role	
2012	Chronicle of My Mother	Kiko Igami		
2014	Say "I love you"	Natsumi		
2015	Shinya Shokudō	Akemi Sugita		
2016	Japanese Girls Never Die	Eri Imai		
2017	Second Summer, Never See You Again			
2021	Skeleton Flowers	Yoshiko		
2023	Adulthood Friends	Kaori Kagaya		
2024	Arrogance and Virtue	Nozomi Iwama		
2025	Brand New Landscape			
2027	Incinerator	Yoko		
2027	Sins of Kujo: The Movie	Tomoko Ichida		
2027	Between Us	Megumi Shiraishi		
