= List of 2015 box office number-one films in Japan =

This is a list of films which placed number one at the weekend box office in Japan for the year 2015. It lists the films with the highest box office gross and when the film with the highest gross is not also the film with the highest attendance, both are listed.

== Number-one films ==
†	This implies the highest-grossing movie of the year.

#	Date	Film	Gross	Notes
1	January 4, 2015	Big Hero 6	US$5.6 million	
2	January 11, 2015	Big Hero 6	US$4.6 million	
3	January 18, 2015	Big Hero 6	US$3.57 million	
4	January 25, 2015	Big Hero 6		
5	February 1, 2015	Big Hero 6	US$2.6 million	
6	February 8, 2015	Teenage Mutant Ninja Turtles	US$2.18 million	In gross
6	February 8, 2015	Big Hero 6	US$1.90 million	In attendance
7	February 15, 2015	Terrace House: Closing Door	US$2.12 million	
8	February 22, 2015	American Sniper	US$2.8 million	
9	March 1, 2015	American Sniper	US$2.43 million	
10	March 8, 2015	Doraemon: Nobita's Space Heroes	US$5.3 million	
11	March 15, 2015	Doraemon: Nobita's Space Heroes	US$3.9 million	
12	March 22, 2015	Assassination Classroom	US$3.42 million	
13	March 29, 2015	Doraemon: Nobita's Space Heroes	US$2.58 million	
14	April 5, 2015	Doraemon: Nobita's Space Heroes	US$2.12 million	
15	April 12, 2015	Solomon's Perjury Part 2: Judgement	US$1.36 million	
16	April 19, 2015	Dragon Ball Z: Resurrection 'F'	US$8.03 million	
17	April 26, 2015	Cinderella	US$4.7 million	
18	May 3, 2015	Cinderella	US$4.27 million	
19	May 10, 2015	Cinderella		
20	May 17, 2015	Cinderella	US$2.63 million	
21	May 24, 2015	Cinderella	US$2 million	
22	May 31, 2015	Shinjuku Swan	US$2 million	
23	June 7, 2015	Tomorrowland	US$2.11 million	
24	June 14, 2015	Love Live! The School Idol Movie	US$3.42 million	
25	June 21, 2015	Mad Max: Fury Road	US$2.13 million	In gross
25	June 21, 2015	Love Live! The School Idol Movie	US$2.10 million	In attendance
26	June 28, 2015	Love Live! The School Idol Movie	US$2.18 million	
27	July 5, 2015	Avengers: Age of Ultron	US$6.5 million	
28	July 12, 2015	The Boy and the Beast	US$5.4 million	
29	July 19, 2015	Hero 2	US$5.9 million	
30	July 26, 2015	Hero 2	US$2.97 million	
31	August 2, 2015	Attack on Titan	US$5.1 million	
32	August 9, 2015	Jurassic World †	US$6.77 million	
33	August 16, 2015	Jurassic World †	US$7.57 million	
34	August 23, 2015	Jurassic World †	US$4.98 million	
35	August 30, 2015	Jurassic World †	US$3.93 million	In gross
35	August 30, 2015	Ted 2	US$3.68 million	In attendance
36	September 6, 2015	Ted 2	US$2.56 million	In gross
36	September 6, 2015	Unfair: The End	US$2.46 million	In attendance
37	September 13, 2015	Pixels	US$1.8 million	
38	September 20, 2015	Attack on Titan: End of the World	US$2.7 million	
39	September 27, 2015	No Longer Heroine	US$1.95 million	
40	October 4, 2015	Bakuman	US$2.1 million	
41	October 11, 2015	Library Wars: The Last Mission	US$2.75 million	
42	October 18, 2015	Library Wars: The Last Mission	US$1.45 million	
43	October 25, 2015	Galaxy Turnpike	US$2.25 million	
44	November 1, 2015	Galaxy Turnpike	US$1.5 million	
45	November 8, 2015	Mozu	US$1.86 million	
46	November 15, 2015	Mozu	US$1.28 million	
47	November 22, 2015	Girls und Panzer der Film	US$1.05 million	In gross
47	November 22, 2015	Raintree	US$1.0 million	In attendance
48	November 29, 2015	The Little Prince	US$0.634 million	
49	December 6, 2015	Spectre	US$2.9 million	
50	December 13, 2015	Orange	US$2.58 million	
51	December 20, 2015	Star Wars: The Force Awakens	US$10.3 million	In gross
51	December 20, 2015	Yo-Kai Watch: Enma Daiō to Itsutsu no Monogatari da Nyan!	US$8.71 million	In attendance
52	December 27, 2015	Star Wars: The Force Awakens	US$5.8 million	In gross
52	December 27, 2015	Yo-Kai Watch: Enma Daiō to Itsutsu no Monogatari da Nyan!	US$4.1 million	In attendance

== Highest-grossing films ==
International film Japanese film

Highest-grossing films of 2015
Rank	Title	Gross
1	Jurassic World	¥9.53 billion ($78.73 million)
2	Big Hero 6	¥9.18 billion ($75.84 million)
3	Yo-Kai Watch the Movie 2: King Enma and the 5 Stories, Nyan!	¥7.80 billion ($64.44 million)
4	The Boy and the Beast	¥5.80 billion ($47.92 million)
5	Cinderella	¥5.73 billion ($47.34 million)
6	Minions	¥5.21 billion ($43.04 million)
7	Mission: Impossible – Rogue Nation	¥5.14 billion ($42.46 million)
8	Hero	¥4.67 billion ($38.58 million)
9	Detective Conan: Sunflowers of Inferno	¥4.48 billion ($37.01 million)
10	Inside Out	¥4.04 billion ($33.38 million)

== See also ==
- List of Japanese films of 2015
