= Cherry Magic! Thirty Years of Virginity Can Make You a Wizard?! =

Japanese boys' love manga series

- Cover of the Japanese version of vol. 1, first published on September 7, 2018

30歳まで童貞だと魔法使いになれるらしい (Sanjūsai made Dōtei Da to Mahōtsukai ni Nareru Rashii)
- Genre: Boys' love, comedy
- Manga
- Written by: Yuu Toyota
- Published by: Square Enix
- English publisher: NA: Square Enix
- Imprint: Gangan Comics Pixiv
- Magazine: Gangan Pixiv
- Original run: September 1, 2018 – present
- Volumes: 16
- Television drama
- Directed by: Hiroki Kazama; Hiroaki Yuasa; Masataka Hayashi
- Written by: Erika Yoshida; Satoko Okazaki
- Music by: Sumika Horiguchi
- Licensed by: NA, BI, AUS: Crunchyroll
- Original network: TV Tokyo
- Original run: October 9, 2020 – December 24, 2020
- Episodes: 12 (+2 specials)
- Anime television series
- Directed by: Yoshiko Okuda
- Written by: Tomoko Konparu
- Music by: Tomoki Hasegawa
- Studio: Satelight
- Licensed by: Crunchyroll: SA/SEA: Medialink
- Original network: TV Tokyo, TVO, TV Aichi, BS TV Tokyo
- Original run: January 11, 2024 – March 28, 2024
- Episodes: 12
- icon

Cherry Magic! Thirty Years of Virginity Can Make You a Wizard?! (Japanese: 30歳まで童貞だと魔法使いになれるらしい, Hepburn: Sanjūsai made Dōtei Da to Mahōtsukai ni Nareru rashii) is a Japanese boys' love (BL) manga series by Yuu Toyota. Toyota first posted the comics on her Twitter and Pixiv accounts in January 2018. After being approached by Gangan Comics, the manga continues to be serialized digitally under their imprint through Pixiv Comics.

A live-action television drama adaptation aired from October 9 to December 24, 2020, on TV Tokyo's MokuDra 25 programming block, which enjoyed high ratings during its broadcast. A sequel to the television drama was later released as a live-action film on April 8, 2022. An anime television series adaptation produced by Satelight aired from January to March 2024.

== Plot ==
Having never had sex in his life, after Kiyoshi Adachi reaches his 30th birthday he becomes a "wizard": he develops an ability to hear the thoughts of other people by touching them. One day, he discovers that his popular co-worker, Yuichi Kurosawa, is in love with him. While dealing with the awkwardness of being able to hear Kurosawa's rather forthright feelings towards him, Adachi comes to terms with how much Kurosawa values him and starts to develop reciprocal feelings of his own.

== Characters ==
Kiyoshi Adachi (安達 清, Adachi Kiyoshi)
Voiced by: Atsushi Abe (drama CD), Chiaki Kobayashi (anime) (Japanese); Daman Mills (English)
Portrayed by: Eiji Akaso (TV drama)
Adachi is a salaryman who, after reaching his 30th birthday as a virgin, develops an ability to read the minds of people he touches. Toyota described Adachi as "serious and straightforward" while also having a rough life because he lacks self-confidence. Toyota also states that he is starting to change because of his relationship with Kurosawa.
Yuichi Kurosawa (黒沢 優一, Kurosawa Yūichi)
Voiced by: Takuya Satō (drama CD), Ryōta Suzuki (anime) (Japanese); Dio Garner (English)
Portrayed by: Keita Machida (TV drama)
Kurosawa is a salaryman working at the same company as Adachi. He is friendly and his good looks makes him popular in the office, but he is also secretly in love with Adachi and often fantasizes about him. Toyota described Kurosawa as being "handsome" but being a "mess" on the inside at the same time, while also having pure feelings of love for Adachi.
Masato Tsuge (柘植 将人, Tsuge Masato)
Voiced by: Kazuyuki Okitsu (drama CD), Makoto Furukawa (anime) (Japanese); Oscar Seung (English)
Portrayed by: Kodai Asaka (TV drama)
Tsuge is Adachi's friend from college who is a romance novelist. Like Adachi, he reaches his 30s as a virgin and is able to read the minds of people he touches. He owns a cat named Udon which he rescued from abandonment. He develops feelings for Minato.
Minato Wataya (綿谷 湊, Wataya Minato)
Voiced by: Kōhei Amasaki (drama CD), Gen Satō (anime) (Japanese); Landon McDonald (English)
Portrayed by: Yutaro (TV drama)
Minato is a deliveryman assigned to Tsuge's neighborhood. Though wary of Tsuge, he is attached to his cat, Udon, which he had wanted to adopt but couldn't.
Yuta Rokkaku (六角 祐太, Rokkaku Yuta)
Voiced by: Yusuke Shirai (anime) (Japanese); Conner Allison (English)
Portrayed by: Takuya Kusakawa (TV drama)
Rokkaku is Adachi's co-worker and an estranged friend of Minato.
Nozomi Fujisaki (藤崎 希, Fujisaki Nozomi)
Voiced by: Ami Koshimizu (anime) (Japanese); Emi Lo (English)
Portrayed by: Ryō Satō (TV drama)
Fujisaki is Adachi's co-worker and secretly a fujoshi.
Kengo Urabe (浦部 健吾, Urabe Kengo)
Portrayed by: Suzunosuke (TV drama)
Urabe is Adachi's co-worker.

== Development ==
Cherry Magic! Thirty Years of Virginity Can Make You a Wizard?! originated as a 4-page comic that Yuu Toyota posted on her Twitter and Pixiv accounts in January 2018. Toyota conceptualized the story seven or eight years prior by imagining what kind of power would be best for someone who has little experience in love, as well as the legend where one will gain magical powers if they stay a virgin past 30 years old. Toyota stated that initially, the main couple was supposed to be similar to Tsuge and Minato, but she felt it was more interesting if the person with the magical powers was the one being pursued. Adachi was created from the idea of a person who has little experience in love and lacking self-confidence, while Kurosawa was created as his foil. Toyota also stated that she has not specified who has the role of the top or bottom in Adachi and Kurosawa's relationship.

Toyota also intended for the theme of Cherry Magic! was to show how, even if one has magical powers, self-confidence is necessary for progress. An hour after it was posted, Ito, an editor who had been following her work for some time, offered her a publishing deal through Twitter. Ito also arranged for Kawai to be Toyota's editor as well. Toyota, Ito, and Kawai noted that Cherry Magic! had a diverse audience, including men and elementary school students. Because of this, Toyota included a disclaimer in Cherry Magic! stating that there may be "adult" developments later in the story, though there were no plans of drawing anything explicit.

== Media ==
=== Manga ===
Cherry Magic! Thirty Years of Virginity Can Make You a Wizard?! is written and illustrated by Yuu Toyota. It is serialized digitally on Gangan Pixiv since September 1, 2018. The chapters were later released in sixteen bound volumes by Square Enix. The series is set to end with the release of its seventeenth volume in 2026.

A drama CD adaptation was released on October 23, 2019, starring Atsushi Abe as Adachi, Takuya Satō as Kurosawa, Kazuyuki Okitsu as Tsuge, and Kōhei Amasaki as Minato. The drama CD is narrated by Kentaro Tone.

An official Chinese radio drama adaptation began airing on April 6, 2022, on the online audio streaming platform MissEvan. It ran for 13 main episodes, with an additional two extra episodes.

At Anime Expo 2019, Square Enix announced that they were distributing the series in English in 2020 as their first boys' love series.

No.	Original release date	Original ISBN	English release date	English ISBN
1	September 7, 2018	978-4757558359	March 10, 2020	978-1646090297
2	May 22, 2019	978-4757561274	September 8, 2020	978-1646090303
3	November 22, 2019	978-4757563902	May 25, 2021	978-1646090310
4	May 22, 2020	978-4757566491 (regular edition); ISBN 978-4757566507 (special edition)	March 22, 2022	978-1646091102
5	October 22, 2020	978-4757569065	August 23, 2022	978-1646091232
6	December 22, 2020	978-4757569799	January 24, 2023	978-1646091416
7	April 4, 2021	978-4757572041	June 20, 2023	978-1646091591
8	October 21, 2021	978-4757575011	August 22, 2023	978-1646091607
9	March 22, 2022	978-4757578319	December 26, 2023	978-1646092109
10	April 21, 2022	978-4757578531	February 27, 2024	978-1646092116
11	November 22, 2022	978-4757582651	June 4, 2024	978-1646092437
12	July 23, 2023	978-4757586703	September 17, 2024	978-1646092987
13	December 21, 2023	978-4757589681	February 11, 2025	978-1646093274
14	April 22, 2024	978-4757590250	July 22, 2025	978-1646093533
15	January 21, 2025	978-4757595811; 978-4757595828 (SE)	February 17, 2026	978-1646094448
16	November 20, 2025	978-4301001812	November 10, 2026	979-8899100291

=== Television drama ===
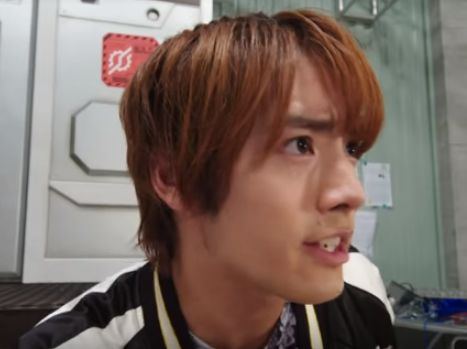
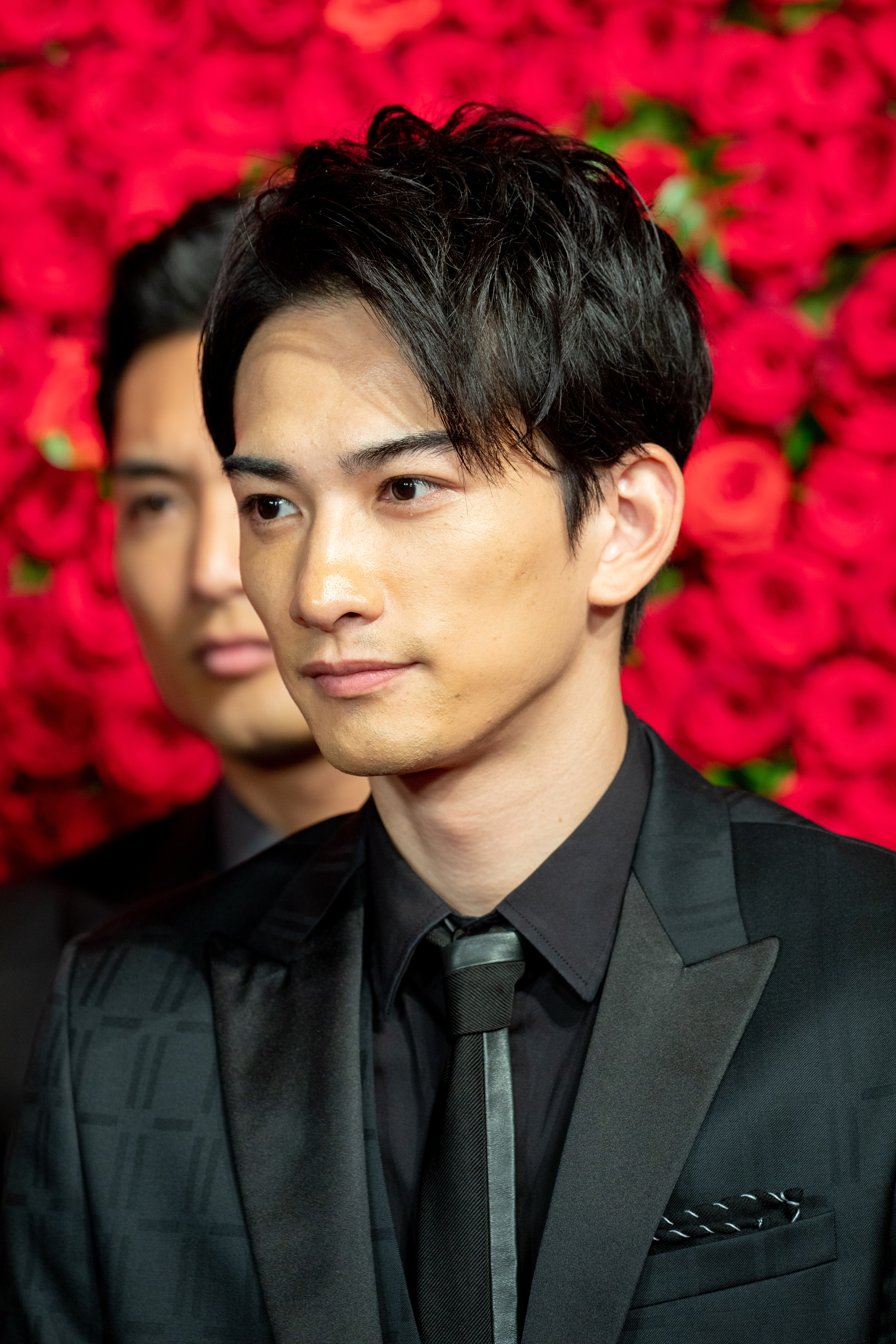
Eiji Akaso (left, pictured in 2018) and Keita Machida (right, pictured in 2018) co-starred in the live-action drama adaptation.

A live-action television series adaptation was announced in September 2020. The series stars Eiji Akaso as Adachi and Keita Machida as Kurosawa. Additional cast members include Kodai Asaka, Yutaro, Takuya Kusakawa, Ryo Sato, and Suzunosuke. It is directed by Hiroki Kazama and written by Erika Yoshida. The series aired from October 9 to December 24, 2020, on TV Tokyo's MokuDra 25 (木ドラ25; lit. "Thursday Drama 25:00") programming block, (Note: TV Tokyo lists the live-action series premiere on October 8 at 25:00, which is effectively October 9 at 1:00 a.m. JST.) and is also distributed through Tsutaya's online streaming service. The opening theme song is "Ubugoe" by Omoinotake and the ending theme is "Good Love Your Love" by Deep Squad. On December 24 of the same year, Tsutaya released two exclusive episodes through their streaming service.

Yuu Toyota initially was unsure that Eiji Akaso could portray Adachi's "nerdy" personality well, but she was later impressed when he got into character. For the drama adaptation, she specifically instructed the production not to use derogatory language towards the yaoi genre or virgins.

In December 2020, Crunchyroll announced that they had licensed the show in English for distribution outside of Asia.

==== Episodes ====
No.	Title	Directed by	Written by	Original release date
1	"Episode 1"; Transliteration: "Dai-ichi-wa" (Japanese: 第1話)	Hiroki Kazama	Erika Yoshida	October 9, 2020
2	"Episode 2"; Transliteration: "Dai-ni-wa" (Japanese: 第2話)	Hiroki Kazama	Erika Yoshida	October 16, 2020
3	"Episode 3"; Transliteration: "Dai-san-wa" (Japanese: 第3話)	Hiroaki Yuasa	Erika Yoshida	October 23, 2020
4	"Episode 4"; Transliteration: "Dai-yon-wa" (Japanese: 第4話)	Hiroaki Yuasa	Erika Yoshida	October 30, 2020
5	"Episode 5"; Transliteration: "Dai-go-wa" (Japanese: 第5話)	Masataka Hayashi	Satoko Okazaki	November 6, 2020
6	"Episode 6"; Transliteration: "Dai-roku-wa" (Japanese: 第6話)	Masataka Hayashi	Satoko Okazaki	November 13, 2020
7	"Episode 7"; Transliteration: "Dai-nana-wa" (Japanese: 第7話)	Hiroki Kazama	Erika Yoshida	November 20, 2020
8	"Episode 8"; Transliteration: "Dai-hachi-wa" (Japanese: 第8話)	Hiroki Kazama	Erika Yoshida	November 27, 2020
9	"Episode 9"; Transliteration: "Dai-kyū-wa" (Japanese: 第9話)	Hiroaki Yuasa	Satoko Okazaki	December 3, 2020
10	"Episode 10"; Transliteration: "Dai-jū-wa" (Japanese: 第10話)	Hiroaki Yuasa	Satoko Okazaki	December 10, 2020
11	"Episode 11"; Transliteration: "Dai-jūichi-wa" (Japanese: 第11話)	Taiki Kazama	Erika Yoshida	December 17, 2020
12	"Episode 12"; Transliteration: "Dai-jūni-wa" (Japanese: 第12話)	Taiki Kazama	Erika Yoshida	December 24, 2020
SP–1	"Valentine's Day / Rokkaku"; Transliteration: "Barentain-hen & Rokkaku-hen" (Japanese: バレンタイン編&六角編)	Unknown	Unknown	December 24, 2020
SP–2	"Tsuge & Minato"; Transliteration: "Tsuge, Minato-hen" (Japanese: 柘植・湊編)	Unknown	Unknown	December 24, 2020

==== Film ====
A live-action film adaptation was released in theaters nationwide in Japan on April 8, 2022. The film is a sequel to the live-action television series, with the cast returning to reprise their roles. The film's theme song is "Shinon" by Omoinotake, with the insert song "Gimme Gimme" performed by Deep Squad.

The film debuted at #6 on its opening weekend. Yuu Toyota, the author of the original manga, donated a portion of the adaptation rights fee to Marriage for All Japan, an organization advocating for same-sex marriage in Japan.

=== Anime ===
An anime television series adaptation was announced on July 14, 2023. It is produced by Satelight and directed by Yoshiko Okuda, with scripts written by Tomoko Konparu, character designs handled by Takahiro Kishida, and music composed by Tomoki Hasegawa. The series aired from January 11 to March 28, 2024, on TV Tokyo and BS TV Tokyo. (Note: TV Tokyo lists the anime series premiere on January 10 at 24:00, which is effectively January 11 at midnight JST.) The opening theme song is "Hajimete wa Zenbu-kun ga Ii" (はじめては全部君がいい), performed by Koe ni Naranai yo, while the ending theme song is "Magical Love" (マジカルラブ), performed by Chiaki Kobayashi and Ryōta Suzuki. Crunchyroll licensed the series outside of Asia. Medialink licensed the series in South and Southeast Asia and streaming it on the Ani-One Asia YouTube channel. An English dub was announced by Crunchyroll on July 16, 2024.

A theatrical compilation film of the series was announced after the final episode of the anime on March 27, 2024. It will premiere in Japanese theaters on December 13, 2024. The compilation film's ending theme song is "Love Candle" (ラブキャンドル), performed by Chiaki Kobayashi and Ryōta Suzuki.

==== Episodes ====
No.	Title (Note: All English titles are taken from Crunchyroll.)	Original release date
1	"Episode 1"; Transliteration: "Dai-ichi-wa"	January 11, 2024
Thirty-year-old Kiyoshi Adachi gains the ability to hear the thoughts of everything he touches, revealing that Yuichi Kurosawa, his well-liked co-worker, likes him. Adachi was not sure that Kurosawa likes him, but later realizes Kurosawa's true feelings. He thinks his magical powers might be imaginary and comes to the realization that his powers are real. That night, Kurosawa comes over to his futon, but Adachi is unsure how to process it. Adachi commits to keeping his distance from Kurosawa because his love is too much for him, but a conversation with his boss brings Kurosawa back close to him. At a local restaurant, Adachi gives Kurosawa money for the meal and says he cannot keep "imposing" on him. Unsure what to do next, the former runs away.
2	"Episode 2"; Transliteration: "Dai-ni-wa"	January 17, 2024
Adachi talks to Masato Tsuge, a romance novelist, for advice, but Tsuge doesn't believe Adachi has special powers and suggests he use the crush to his advantage, but Adachi refuses. Tsuge suggests that Adachi think about Kurosawa. He later learns that Tsuge is also a virgin, surprising him. He thinks about Kurosawa and can't think of anything to dislike. Later, Adachi uses his special power to assist Kurosawa during the work day, after Kurosawa is in a bind with a tough client, learning that the company president has a sweet tooth. At the bar, Adachi is glad about his special power. However, during a King's Game involving drinking, Kurosawa gives him a forehead kiss. He later talks to Kurosawa about what happened. Before Kurosawa can say what he wants, he is interrupted. The next day, he wonders what Kurosawa is thinking, before Kurosawa comes to help him out.
3	"Episode 3"; Transliteration: "Dai-san-wa"	January 24, 2024
Adachi goes to a work party, where girls are fawning over Kurosawa. The new hire, Rokkaku, comes over, and Adachi is annoyed. He helps Rokkaku, who is drunk, with Kurosawa watching carefully. He gets Rokkaku to leave, claiming that girls are interested in him. Adachi attempts to touch Kurosawa so he can know what Kurosawa is thinking, but ends up not doing so, and Kurosawa declines to sing karaoke. Adachi defends the staff secretary, Kujisaki, from drunken men, and Kurosawa comes to his aid. While the two drunken men depart, Adachi feels conflicted that Kurosawa saved him. Later, Kurosawa, Adachi, and coworkers go to a sauna. Kurosawa remembers back to when he and Adachi went to a dinner party, where they meet President Matsuura. In the present, Adachi says that he has gained more confidence while being around Kurosawa, and they take a photo together.
4	"Episode 4"; Transliteration: "Dai-yon-wa"	February 1, 2024
Masato Tsuge is awoken by his cat, Udon, and he begins writing more of his novel. He realizes that he also has mind-reading powers when accidentally touching the hand of the new deliveryman. Afterward, he can't get the face of the deliveryman out of his head and the deliveryman appears again, watching Udon playing. That night, Tsuge goes to a bar with Adachi, with Tsuge noting that Adachi is more excited, thanks to interactions with Kurosawa, and notes he can't calm down. Tsuge tries to tell him about his new ability, but Adachi departs when seeing Kurosawa with a young woman across the street, believing it is Kurosawa and his ex-girlfriend. Adachi gets sick after getting soaking wet from walking in the rain. He is awoken when Kurosawa comes to visit him and cooks for him. It is later revealed the woman Adachi saw with Kurosawa was his big sister, causing Adachi to be relieved. He proposes that Adachi and Kurosawa stay together.
5	"Episode 5"; Transliteration: "Dai-go-wa"	February 8, 2024
Kurosawa accidentally ends up in an awkward position with Adachi. The next morning, Adachi has recovered from his cold and realizes that Kurosawa really likes him. They ride the train to work together and Adachi tells Kurosawa his voice sounds nice. He invites over Rokkaku to put a buffer between himself and Kurosawa, to the annoyance of Kurosawa. They all eat takoyaki together, with Kurosawa and Rokkaku trying to one-up one another. Later, he learns that Rokkaku still dreams about dancing and encourages him to start dancing again. As Rokkaku takes a nap, he and Kurosawa talk about Rokkaku, and Kurosawa gets close. Rokkaku spends the night because he misses the last train and ends up sleeping beside Kurosawa. The next day, while working, Adachi gets a look into the inner thoughts of Fujisaki, who is fantasizing about Kurosawa and Adachi being together, but Adachi incorrectly thinks Fujisaki likes him. That night, Kurosawa confesses his love for Adachi, who is unsure how to react.
6	"Episode 6"; Transliteration: "Dai-roku-wa"	February 15, 2024
Adachi touches the hand of Fujisaki and offers to help her with work. Later, she suggests that he give Kurosawa work materials when he returns from his trip, which he agrees to. He falsely believes that Fujisaki has feelings for him. Later, Kurosawa believes he caused trouble for Adachi by confessing his love. Adachi realizes he can't go back to how things were before, and runs out of the building and toward Kurosawa. He confesses his love for Kurosawa, who hugs him in response. Adachi feels self-conscious and gets out of the embrace before Asahina, Kurosawa's coworker, sees them. Later that day, Fujisaki's instincts tell her that something good happened between Kurosawa and Adachi. Masato thinks he might be in love with the deliveryman. He unexpectedly meets the deliveryman, who is buying sneakers for dancing and learns the man's name: Minato. Adachi talks to Kurosawa on the phone and comes to realization that Kurosawa asked him out on a date. Kurosawa is excited, but Adachi doesn't know how to prepare for it.
7	"Episode 7"; Transliteration: "Dai-nana-wa"	February 22, 2024
Adachi realizes he overslept and scrambles to get himself ready, realizing he has no accessories. He later imagines Kurosawa singing a song about their date. They go to a clothing store, where Adachi is amazed at the selections. Kurosawa offers to pay for an outfit to commemorate their first date, but Adachi pays instead. They both go sightseeing. Adachi is unsure how close he and Kurosawa should be after hearing comments from onlookers. Kurosawa surprises him by renting a helicopter so they can "walk in the sky." Adachi is terrified and his reaction causes them to cancel the helicopter ride. He begins to think that he isn't good enough for Kurosawa, but hearing Kurosawa's inner thoughts makes him change his mind, as he realizes that he was also nervous. He resolves to tell Kurosawa how he feels next time. He does exactly this the next day and they hang out together. Adachi admits he wasn't sure what people do on dates and Kurosawa realizes this is something he hasn't thought of, with Adachi saying it doesn't matter what other people think of them. Later, they end up holding hands until they reach the train station. At one point, he accidentally responds to Kurosawa's inner thought out loud. He thinks about telling Kurosawa he is a "wizard."
8	"Episode 8"; Transliteration: "Dai-hachi-wa"	February 29, 2024
Adachi is unsure if he should tell Kurosawa about his "wizard" powers. Adachi and Kurosawa agree to ask their friends to be in a strength training program. Adachi thinks of a birthday present for Kurosawa's next birthday on July 3rd. Tsuge goes to a club because he wanted to see Minato dance, but feels out of place while there. He attempts to dance, but ends up hurting himself. He hears Minato praising him and is glad he came. Minato is impressed with Tsuge's photographs and Tsuge is overwhelmed by Minato's thoughts. Later, Adachi is unsure how to casually give Kurosawa a gift (airpods) and he is glad to get it. Minato and Tsuge come to a strength training program, and Kurosawa gets jealous, while Tsuage wonders about the relationship between Adachi and Kurosawa. Adachi learns that "wizards" like himself and Tsuge can communicate telepathically. He and Tsuage talk about their "wizard" powers and he encourages Tsuge to be more forward with Minato. Kurosawa tells Adachi he is jealous, forcing Adachi to clarify things. He reveals his wizard powers to Kurosawa, surprising him; Kurosawa is embarrassed that Adachi can hear his thoughts. They end up kissing one another, then hugging.
9	"Episode 9"; Transliteration: "Dai-kyū-wa"	March 7, 2024
Adachi tells Kurosawa he can't take any more kissing and they head back to meet the others, with Kurosawa saying he is glad to get any gift from Adachi. He says he got his best gift from Adachi: their first kiss. Tsuge reads the thoughts of Rokkaku. Tsuge talks to Minato about seeing Rokkaku there and the awkwardness between them. Tsuge debates whether he will help his "rival" (Rokkaku) or not and he ends up telling Minato that friendships are important, especially between college friends. Later, Rokkaku gives Minato the gift he left behind and they get over any misunderstandings. Minato hugs Tsuge, telling him he is right, causing him to blush. Kurosawa messes with Adachi, knowing Adachi can read his thoughts. Adachi talks to his boss who tells him about a proposed offer that he transfer to a new branch in Nagasaski. He ends up making a mistake at work, missing his date with Kurosawa, and feels bad about it. The next day, Kurosawa asks Adachi why he made the decision about rejecting the transfer on his own, and he tells Adachi he doesn't know he is thinking unless he tells him and walks away, with Adachi in shock.
10	"Episode 10"; Transliteration: "Dai-jū-wa"	March 14, 2024 (Note: This episode aired at 12:10 a.m. JST, 10 minutes after the original air time on TV Tokyo.)
Adachi attempts to fix his relationship with Kurosawa. Minato is impressed by the fact that Tsuge is a professional author. Tsuge says he will be rooting for Minato who is trying to become a more established professional dancer. Adachi attempts to get advice from Tsuge as to how proceed with Kurosawa. Tsuge asks Adachi what he will do if he loses his mind-reading power, and Adachi admits he is relying upon it too much. Minato ends up failing a first-round audition, but is later offered an office job. Later, Tsuge drives Minato to the next round on his motorbike. Minato moves forward in the competition, but loses in the final round. The next day, Tsuge remains worried about Minato, but doesn't want to further intrude into his life. That night, he learns that Minato is now a member of the Trap Trick band, and believes that their time together will be over. Adachi begins his work trip to Nagasaki, but resolves to tell Kurosawa how he feels.
11	"Episode 11"; Transliteration: "Dai-jūichi-wa"	March 21, 2024 (Note: This episode aired at 12:30 a.m. JST, 30 minutes after the original air time on TV Tokyo.)
Kurosawa thinks about Adachi and back to what he said, and says he has no right to dictate Adachi's choices while they are dating. He is also afraid that Adachi will leave him. Later, he reads Adachi's letter to him. Kurosawa promises they will talk when Adachi gets back. Adachi continues his business trip in Nagasaki and is encouraged by a work colleague to keep sharing his ideas. Tsuge tries to turn his romantic feelings for Minato into a novel, but fails to come up with any words. Later, he leaves a gift for Minato, to the surprise of Minato. They meet outside the concert hall, with Minato saying he was unsure how to respond to him. Tsuge admits his book character was based on Minato. He confesses his feelings for Minato and Minato reciprocates these feelings, blushes, and both hug one another. Kurosawa unexpectedly shows up outside the hotel where Adachi is staying, and they talk about their feelings for one another, followed by a kiss.
12	"Episode 12"; Transliteration: "Dai-jūni-wa"	March 28, 2024
Adachi wakes up and is embarrassed that he "did it" with Kurosawa the night before. He later realizes he can't hear Kurosawa's thoughts anymore because he slept with him. Kurosawa says he is grateful for Adachi's magic power, but says this isn't why he fell in love with him, it was his words. Adachi says he doesn't regret sleeping with him one bit, surprising Kurosawa at the intensity of his words. He doesn't understand how Adachi is being more charming than him. The next day, Adachi takes photos at a future work site. After he gets home, Kurosawa cooks a meal for him. Adachi decides to accept the offer to transfer to the Nagasaki branch, where he will stay for a year. Tsuge learns that Adachi is no longer a "wizard." Adachi adjusts to his new job, but there are continual problems, and Kusumoto is helping him along the way. Adachi is tired from his work on the new store and begins to miss Kurosawa. Both of them think what they can for each other. Adachi flies back to Tokyo to see Kurosawa, admits he misses him, and proposes they live together after he returns from Nagasaki. Not long after, they put rings on each other's fingers. Tsuge and Minato hang out. At work, their one coworker notices Adachi and Kurosawa's matching rings. Later, Adachi and Kurosawa get married.

=== Other adaptations ===
In November 2022, a Thai television drama adaptation was green-lit. The drama began airing in December 2023. It was directed by Nuttapong Mongkolsawas and starred Tawan Vihokratana and Thitipoom Techaapaikhun.

A musical adaptation titled CheriMaho The Musical is set to run at Tokyo Dome City Hall in Tokyo from April 11 to April 20, 2025, and at iplaza Toyohashi in Aichi from April 25 to April 27, 2025. It will be written and directed by Keita Kawajiri. The musical will star Ryo Matsuda as Kiyoshi Adachi, Yoshihiko Aramaki as Yuichi Kurosawa, Daichi Saeki as Masato Tsuge, Satsuki Nakayama as Minato Wataya, Kaho Takada as Nozomi Fujisaki, Yui Hasegawa as Mari Kurosawa, and Naoya Gomoto as Asahina.

== Reception ==
Rebecca Silverman from Anime News Network complimented the story, humor, and romance, but mentioned that the plot could get too "convoluted" and was too tame for its mature rating. Faye Hopper from Anime News Network stated that while the romance was "cute", there were some concerns over humor regarding Kurosawa's explicit fantasies about Adachi. Volume 2 was the 7th best-selling manga on its week of release at Tsutaya.

In a weekly survey for the Drama Satisfaction Ranking, the live-action television drama adaptation received 27/100 points for its first episode, 63/100 points for the second episode, and 79/100 points for the third episode. By the fourth episode, it received 86/100 points, making it the second highest ranked television series for the week. The seventh and eighth episodes both scored 87/100 points while the ninth episode scored 89/100, with all three being the highest ranked in their respective weeks. The tenth episode scored 90/100 points and was the highest ranked in its week. In Taiwan, the television drama was the highest viewed show on KKTV for six consecutive weeks.

== See also ==
- Papa and Daddy's Home Cooking, another manga series by Yuu Toyota
