= Nou Shou Sakuretsu Girl =

2012 song by Rerulili

Single by Hatsune Miku and Megpoid

from the album Nōshō Sakuretsu Girl
- Released: October 2012
- Genre: World fusion
- Songwriter: Rerulili

"Nou Shou Sakuretsu Girl" (脳漿炸裂ガール, Nōshō Sakuretsu Gāru; lit. "Brain Fluid Explosion Girl") is a 2012 song written by Japanese Vocaloid producer Rerulili. It has been adapted into a light novel, manga, and live-action film, all of which were written by screenwriter Erika Yoshida.

== Background and release ==
Rerulili, as explained in an interview with Mynavi News, conceived the idea behind "Nou Shou Sakuretsu Girl" when, having hit a creative wall while focusing on pop and ballads, he researched current trends and noticed that young people were gravitating toward high-volume tracks featuring rapid-fire vocal delivery; he decided to take on the challenge despite it being outside his comfort zone. He also mentioned that he had intentionally written the lyrics somewhat haphazardly to stimulate the listeners' imaginations, and was surprised to find people speculating that the song contained a critique of AKB48.

"Nou Shou Sakuretsu Girl" was uploaded to Nico Nico Douga by Rerulili in October 2012. It was his first song to reach one million views, doing so in January 2013. surpassed 1.5 million views within five months. Its popularity endured, eventually achieving "Hall of Fame" status (10 million views on Nico Nico Douga) in 2023.

Another self-cover version of "Nou Shou Sakuretsu Girl" featuring Kagamine Rin and Megurine Luka was released to commemorate the one-million view milestone. A live-action music video commemorating the two-million view milestone was released in July 2013. In 2015, a self-remake named "Nou Shou Bakuretsu Girl 2015 Ver" was released. A sequel of this song was also released, titled "Isshoku Sokuhatsu Zen Girl" (一触即発 禅ガール).

"Nou Shou Sakuretsu Girl" was the first song of the album of the same name, released on 28 December 2012.

== Contents ==
"Nou Shou Bakuretsu Girl" is characterized by rapid-fire lyrics and an up-tempo beat. Its lyrics and music were written by Rerulili, and Hatsune Miku and Megpoid are the vocalists.

A diverse range of genres appear in "Nou Shou Sakuretsu Girl", including electronic music, jazz, and traditional Japanese musical instruments; Animate Times stated that the song's rapid changes in style is a "key charm" of the song. UtaTen remarks that the lyrics indicate "a song about the daily life of a girl with a masochistic streak".

== Other media ==
=== Light novel ===
A novelization of "Nou Shou Sakuretsu Girl" was written by Erika Yoshida; she had landed the job after having a class where Hatsune Miku was discussed. It is about high school students Hana Ichii and Hana Inazawa appearing in a cell phone survival game. Kadokawa Beans Bunko released six volumes of the light novel.

==== Volumes ====
No.	Original release date	Original ISBN	English release date	English ISBN
1	1 December 2013	978-40-4-101105-8	—	—
2	1 March 2014	978-40-4-101263-5	—	—
3	1 August 2014	978-40-4-101716-6	—	—
4	1 December 2014	978-40-4-101717-3	—	—
5	1 May 2015	978-40-4-102730-1	—	—
6	1 August 2015	978-40-4-102729-5	—	—

=== Manga ===
A self-titled manga adaptation of the song began serialization in Young Ace's May 2015 issue; it was illustrated by Kudan Natsuka and written by Erika Yoshida. It centers on schoolboy Inase Ukiha (浮葉いなせ, Ukiha Inase) being attacked by a brain-eating monster.

==== Volumes ====
No.	Original release date	Original ISBN	English release date	English ISBN
1	25 July 2015	978-4-04-103451-4	—	—
2	4 March 2016	978-4-04-103865-9	—	—
3	4 November 2016	978-4-04-104859-7	—	—

=== Live-action film ===
"Nou Shou Sakuretsu Girl" was adapted into a live-action film, directed by Yūichi Abe, written by Erika Yoshida and starring Hinata Kashiwagi and Seika Taketomi. The theme song is a cover version of the titular song by Shiritsu Ebisu Chugaku. It was also the first live-action adaptation of a Vocaloid song.

Nou Shou Sakuretsu Girl was released on 25 July 2015 by Kadokawa Corporation, and was screened at a premium Nico Nico Live stream. It made ¥18 million in the box office. Critic Kazufumi Iida described the film as part of a trend of successful "Vocaloid novels" following up on the popularity of the Kagerou Project multimedia project. It was scheduled for a theatrical release in Taiwan, but it was canceled due to declining sales which a lawsuit attributed to a fast movie by YouTuber AmoGood.

=== Stage adaptations ===
There have been two stage adaptations of "Nou Shou Sakuretsu Girl": Nōshō Sakuretsu Girl: Ningen Dōbutsuen (脳漿炸裂ガール ～人間動物園～, Nōshō Sakuretsu Gāru ~Ningen Dōbutsuen~), performed in 2019, and the latter, Nōshō Sakuretsu Gāru 2: Zokubutsu Kikō/Anarchy in the Journey (脳漿炸裂ガール2 〜俗物奇行〜 Anarchy in the Journey, Nōshō Sakuretsu Gāru 2 ~ Zokubutsu Kikō ~ Anarchy in the Journey), performed at Rikkoukai Hall from 2 to 6 June 2021.
