= Hero (2015 Japanese film) =

- Poster
- Directed by: Masayuki Suzuki (ja)
- Based on: Hero
- Produced by: Tsuneya Watanabe; Kazutoshi Wadakura
- Starring: Takuya Kimura; Keiko Kitagawa; Tetta Sugimoto; Yutaka Matsushige; Takuzō Kadono; Takako Matsu; Kōichi Satō
- Release date: July 18, 2015
- Running time: 119 minutes
- Country: Japan
- Language: Japanese
- Box office: ¥4.67 billion

Hero is a 2015 Japanese mystery comedy-drama film directed by Masayuki Suzuki (ja) and based on the Japanese television drama series of the same name. It was released on July 18, 2015.

== Plot ==
A simple hit and run turns out to be anything but when prosecutor Kohei Kuryu realises the victim was a witness in a case against the yakuza.

== Cast ==
- Takuya Kimura as Kohei Kuryu
- Keiko Kitagawa as Chika Asagi
- Takako Matsu as Maiko Amamiya
- Kōichi Satō
- Tetta Sugimoto
- Gaku Hamada
- Bokuzō Masana
- Yō Yoshida
- Yōji Tanaka
- Katsuya
- Yutaka Matsushige
- Norito Yashima
- Fumiyo Kohinata
- Takuzō Kadono
- Kōji Ōkura

== Reception ==
The film was number-one on its opening weekend, grossing ¥733 million. It remained in number-one in the following weekend, with ¥368 million. The film was the third highest-grossing Japanese film at the Japanese box office in 2015, with ¥4.67 billion in revenue.
