= All Grown Up With You, Still Just Friends =

Japanese manga series

- First tankōbon volume cover

おとななじみ (Otonanajimi)
- Genre: Romantic comedy
- Manga
- Written by: Aya Nakahara
- Published by: Shueisha
- English publisher: Shueisha (digital)
- Imprint: Margaret Comics
- Magazine: Cocohana
- Original run: March 28, 2019 – October 28, 2021
- Volumes: 8
- Live-action film
- Directed by: Hiroto Takahashi
- Written by: Erika Yoshida
- Music by: Ryō Noguchi
- Studio: Office Crescendo
- Released: May 12, 2023
- Runtime: 113 minutes
- icon

All Grown Up With You, Still Just Friends (Japanese: おとななじみ, Hepburn: Otonanajimi) is a Japanese manga series written and illustrated by Aya Nakahara. It was serialized in Shueisha's josei manga magazine Cocohana from March 2019 to October 2021, with its chapters collected into eight tankōbon volumes. A live-action film adaptation premiered in Japan in May 2023.

== Media ==
=== Manga ===
Written and illustrated by Aya Nakahara, All Grown Up With You, Still Just Friends was serialized in Shueisha's Cocohana magazine from March 28, 2019, to October 28, 2021. Eight tankōbon volumes have been released from July 2019 to December 2021. Shueisha began publishing the manga in English on its Manga Million digital platform in 2026.

==== Volumes ====
No.	Japanese release date	Japanese ISBN
1	July 25, 2019	978-4-08-844228-0
2	December 25, 2019	978-4-08-844285-3
3	April 24, 2020	978-4-08-844336-2
4	August 25, 2020	978-4-08-844372-0
5	December 24, 2020	978-4-08-844389-8
6	April 23, 2021	978-4-08-844484-0
7	August 25, 2021	978-4-08-844519-9
8	December 24, 2021	978-4-08-844563-2

=== Live-action film ===
In October 2022, it was announced that the manga will receive a live-action film adaptation, starring HiHi Jets member Mizuki Inoue as Haru Aoyama and Rinka Kumada as Kaede Kagaya. The film is produced by Office Crescendo and directed by Hiroto Takahashi, based on a screenplay written by Erika Yoshida, with music composed by Ryō Noguchi. It was released in Japan by Toei Company on May 12, 2023. Kis-My-Ft2 performed the film's theme song "Sweet Melody".
