= Ayano Fukuda =

- 福田 彩乃
- Born: 18 September 1988 (age 36); Toyota, Aichi, Japan
- Education: Amuse Zenkoku Audition 2009
- Occupations: tarento; impressionist
- Years active: 2009–present
- Agent: Amuse, Inc.
- Known for: Bakushō! Monomane Wars; Monomane Grand Prix; U-La-La Nanapachi; Nōkatsu Update Q! Smart Monkeys!!
- Height: 1.55 m (5 ft 1 in)

Ayano Fukuda (福田 彩乃, Fukuda Ayano, born 18 September 1988) is a Japanese tarento and impressionist (monomane tarento) who has appeared in a number of television programmes and feature films. Fukuda is represented with Amuse, Inc.

== Education ==
Fukuda graduated from Toyota City Late Field Junior High School and Aichi Prefectural Toyono High School.

== Impressions ==
- Yū Aoi
- Yūki Amami
- Namie Amuro
- Ayaka
- Haruka Ayase
- Satomi Ishihara
- Aya Ueto
- Juri Ueno
- Tomoko Kaneda
- Karina Nose
- Keiko Kitagawa
- Michiko Kichise
- Kumi Koda
- Erika Sawajiri
- Ryoko Shinohara
- Kō Shibasaki
- Suzanne
- Ami Suzuki
- Serina
- Atsuko Takahata
- Christel Takigawa
- Mariya Takeuchi
- Yūko Takeuchi
- Rei Dan
- Takako Tokiwa
- Mika Nakashima
- Yukie Nakama
- Masami Nagasawa
- Kyoko Fukada
- Eri Fukatsu
- Bobby Ologun
- Maki Horikita
- Atsuko Maeda
- Yuki Matsushita
- Nanako Matsushima
- Nobuhiro Matsuda
- Miki Maya
- Izumi Mori
- You
- Yuriko Yoshitaka
- Rola

== Filmography ==
=== TV series ===
Year	Title	Network	Notes
2011	Bakushō! Monomane Wars	TBS	
2011	Motel: Hoshigaru Danjo no Mote-gaku	KTV	
2011	Shikaku Habataku	NHK-E	Monthly guest
2011	U-La-La Nanapachi	Tokyo MX	"Kyō no Ikemen" reporter
2011	Monomane Grand Prix	NTV	Appeared in the 9th "The Survival" (Note: Fukuda also appeared in Fuji Television's Bakushō sokkuri monomane Kōhaku Uta Gassen Special, aired in the 30 March 2010.)
2012	Happy Music	NTV	Irregular appearances as a Happy Music Store clerk
2012	Nōkatsu Update Q! Smart Monkeys!!	Fuji TV	Regular solver
2012	Shiawase no Kiiroi Koinu	CTV	Responsible for location
2012	Presat!	THK	Biweekly regular appearances
2015	Ayano Fukuda no Hatsumono	THK	

=== TV drama ===
Year	Title	Role	Network	Notes
2009	Hanawa-ka no Yonshimai	Maki Fukushima	TBS	
2012	Ataru	Natsumi Kano	TBS	
2012	Hontoni atta Kowai Hanashi Natsu no Tokubetsu-hen 2012: Aru Natsu no Dekigoto	Saki Tadokoro	Fuji TV	
2012	Kekkon shinai	Mariko Suzumura	Fuji TV	
2013	Take Five: Oretachi wa Ai o Nusumeru ka	Nana Kakizawa	TBS	
2013	Andō Lloyd: A.I. knows Love?	Laplace	TBS	Episode 1
2014	Kindaichi Shōnen no Jiken-bo N	Kozue Kikukawa	NTV	Episode 2
2014	Heisei Saru Kani Gassen-zu	Mizuki Majima	WOWOW	
2015	Masshiro	Hiromi Nonomura (Yasumura)	TBS	Episodes 1 and 7; Guest
2015	Mare	Yayoi Ueda	NHK-G, NHK BS Premium	
2016	Tot terebi	Kyoko Satomi	NHK	Episodes 1 and 2

=== Radio ===
Year	Title	Network
2011	Asuka Ishii to Ayano Fukuda no Green Room e yōkoso!	FM West Tokyo
2012	Yoko Aramaki, Ayano Fukuda: Suppin Radio	NCB
	Ayano Fukuda: Monomane Donburi	YBC, YBS, BSN, JRT, MRT
2015	Ayano Fukuda no All Night Nippon R	NBS

=== Films ===
Year	Title	Role
2015	Heroine Shikkaku	Kyoko Nakajima

=== Stage ===
Year	Title	Role	Ref.
2013	2LDK		
2016	Sanbaba	Ohana	

=== Music videos ===
Year	Title
2013	IsamU "100-kai Nakukoto"

=== Voice acting ===
Year	Title	Role	Notes
2013	Silent Hill: Revelation	Heather Mason / Alessa	Japanese dub; Theatrical release only
2013	Kamen Rider Wizard in Magic Land	Speaking Door	
2013	Space Pirate Captain Harlock	Tori-san	
2014	Maleficent	Knotgrass, Thistletwit, Flttile	Japanese dub; Three roles
