= Keita Machida =

Japanese actor (born 1990)

- 町田 啓太
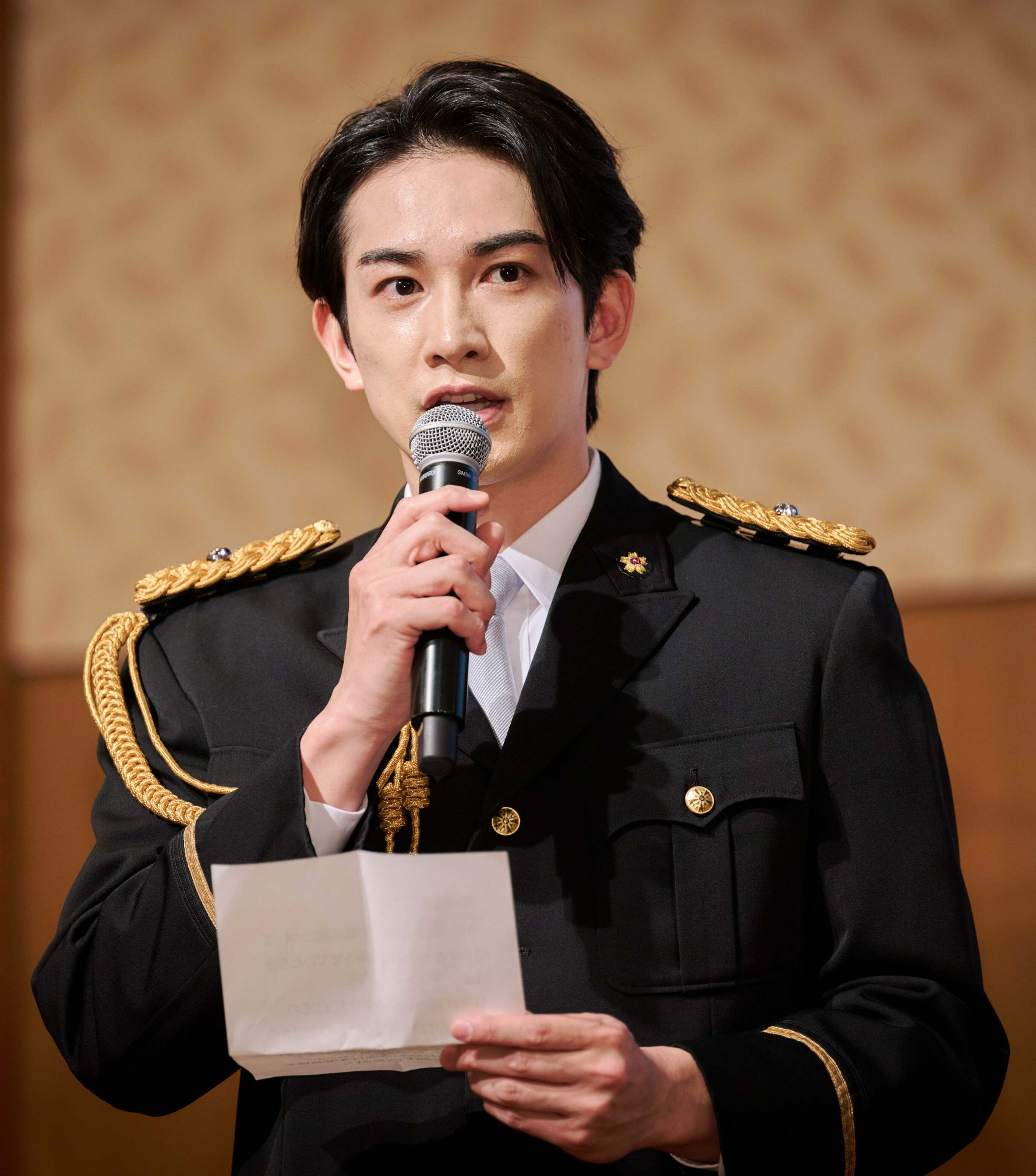
- Machida in March 2023
- Born: 4 July 1990 (age 36); Higashiagatsuma, Gunma, Japan
- Education: Japan Airlines High School, Ishikawa
- Occupation: Actor
- Years active: 2010–present
- Agents: LDH; HB Entertainment
- Spouse: Hyunri (m. 2022)
- Children: 1

Keita Machida (町田 啓太, Machida Keita; born 4 July 1990) is a Japanese actor. He is a member of the theater group Gekidan Exile. Machida is represented by LDH in Japan and HB Entertainment in South Korea.

== Personal life ==
Machida was born on 4 July 1990, in Higashiagatsuma, Japan. He has one younger and one older sister. Starting in elementary school, he learned Kendo until entering junior high school. After graduating junior high school, Machida joined the Japan Aviation High School in Ishikawa, as he had loved vehicles since his childhood and aspired to be a pilot. He started dancing when he was in high school and took on the role of captain in his dance club. In his youth Machida also attended EXPG Tokyo, a talent school run by LDH.

=== Marriage ===
On 25 December 2022, Machida married South Korean actress, Hyunri, after dating for five years. He and his wife announced in a joint statement delivered through their respective agencies that they had welcomed the birth of their first child on September 26, 2026.

== Career ==
Machida joined Gekidan Exile on 25 January 2011, after successfully passing the Dai 3kai Gekidan Exile Audition. Although in July 2011, he was announced as a candidate member of Generations from Exile Tribe and left Gekidan Exile. In September of the same year, he injured the calf of his right leg and focused on recovering.

On 14 February 2012, it was reported that he had dropped out from being a Generations candidate and rejoined Gekidan Exile to focus on acting.

On 20 November 2019, Machida released his first photo book titled Basic.

On 31 March 2021, he participated in the Tokyo 2020 Olympic Torch Relay as a torchbearer for his prefecture Gunma. In the same year he was selected as ambassador for the special exhibition celebrating the 260th anniversary of the birth of the famous Japanese artist Hokusai.

== Filmography ==
=== Television ===
Year	Title	Role	Notes	Ref.
2014	Hanako and Anne	Ikuya Muraoka	Asadora	
2015	Tenshi no Knife	Keiji Nagaoka		
2015	Bijo to Danshi	Ryo Sakisaka		
2015	High&Low: The Story of S.W.O.R.D.	Noboru Harada		
2015	Gattan Gattan: Soredemo Go	Shinichi Morita	Lead role	
2016	Sumika Sumire: 45-sai Wakagaetta Onna	Yusei Mashiro		
2017	It's All About the Looks	Takuma Maruo		
2017–18	Love or Not	Wataru Sano	2 seasons	
2018	Joshi-teki Seikatsu / Life As a Girl	Tadaomi Goto	Miniseries	
2018	Segodon	Komatsu Tatewaki	Taiga drama	
2018	Prince of Legend	Riichi Yuki		
2018	Meet Me After School	Shotaro Kawai		
2019	Nusumareta Kao	Ryohei Tani	Miniseries	
2019	Princess Michiko Story of Unknown Love and Suffering	Seiji Goto	Television film	
2019	Hotarugusa Nana no Ken	Ichinoshin Kazahaya		
2019	Parallel Tokyo	Koichi Saito	Miniseries	
2019	Uncontrol Frontier Icon		Episode 1	
2020	Wasteful Days of High School Girls	Masataka Sawatari/Waseda		
2020	Guilty: Kono Koi wa Tsumi desu ka?	Keiichi Akiyama		
2020	Akiko's Piano: Hibakushita Piano ga Kanaderu Oto	Shigeru Takeuchi	Television film	
2020	Cherry Magic! Thirty Years of Virginity Can Make You a Wizard?!	Yuichi Kurosawa		
2020–22	Alice in Borderland	Daikichi Karube	2 seasons	
2021	Nishiogikubo Mitsuboshi Youshudou	Ryoichiro Amamiya	Lead role	
2021	Reach Beyond the Blue Sky	Hijikata Toshizō	Taiga drama	
2021	Uso kara hajimaru koi	Kamoshita Junnosuke	Television film	
2021	Mangaka Ienaga no fukuzatsu shakai o chō teigi	Kazuhiro Ienaga	Education series	
2021	Super Rich	Sora Miyamura		
2021	Uso Kara Hajimaru Koi - Hulu Special	Kamoshita Junnosuke		
2021	JAM -the drama-	Takeru Nishino		
2022	Isn't It a Bad Guy?	Gonta Tamachi	Lead role	
2022	Teppachi!	Kokusho Hiroshi	Lead role	
2023	Ichigeki	Ichizo	Television film	
2023	Fixer	Tatsuya Watanabe		
2023	YuYu Hakusho	Koenma		
2024	Dear Radiance	Fujiwara no Kintō	Taiga drama	
2025	Glass Heart	Sho Takaoka		
2026	Sins of Kujo	Kengo Mibu		

=== Films ===
Year	Title	Role	Notes	Ref.
2015	Sukimasuki	Heisaku	Lead role	
2015	Ghost Theater	Hiroshi Izumi		
2016	Road to High & Low	Noboru Harada		
2016	High&Low The Movie	Noboru Harada		
2016	High&Low The Red Rain	Noboru Harada		
2017	High&Low The Movie 2 / End of Sky	Noboru Harada		
2017	High&Low The Movie 3 / Final Mission	Noboru Harada		
2017	Koinowa: Konkatsu Cruising	Yoji Kitano		
2018	Over Drive	Junpei Masuda		
2018	jam	Takeru Nishino		
2019	The Nikaidos' Fall	Yōsuke		
2019	L-DK: Two Loves, Under One Roof	Soju Kugayama		
2019	Prince of Legend	Riichi Yuki		
2020	Project Dream: How to Build Mazinger Z's Hangar	Yamada		
2020	Your Eyes Tell	Kyosuke Sakuma		
2022	Cherry Magic! the Movie	Yuichi Kurosawa		
2022	Sun and Bolero	Keisuke Tanoura		
2023	Don't Call it Mystery: The Movie	Kirinosuke Kariatsumari		
2025	10Dance	Shin'ya Sugiki	Lead role	
2027	Sins of Kujo: The Movie	Kengo Mibu		

=== Theater ===
Year	Title	Role	Notes	Ref.
2010	Rokudenashi Blues	Beishime Sawamura		
2013	Sadako: Tanjō Hiwa	Hiroshi Toyama	Lead role	
2020	Gekidan Exile "Yusha no Tame ni Kane wa Naru / The Bell Rings for the Brave"			
2020	Book Act "Geinin Koukan Nikki"			

=== Radio drama ===
Year	Title	Role	Network	Ref.
2019	Shinjuku no neko	Haruta Yamazaki	NHK-FM	

=== Music videos ===
Year	Title	Ref.
2011	Sandaime J Soul Brothers "Fighters"	
2016	Doberman Infinity "Do or Die"	
2022	Generations from Exile Tribe "Chikara no Kagiri"	

== Photobook ==
	Year	Title	Ref.
	2017	"High&Low The Photography" Noboru (ノボル)/町田啓太	
1st	2019	Basic	
	2020	Basic Another Edition	

== Awards and nominations ==
Year	Award	Category	Nominated work	Result	Ref.
2020	The 30th TV Life Annual Drama Awards	Best Supporting Actor	Cherry Magic! Thirty Years of Virginity Can Make You a Wizard?!	Won	
2021	The 31st TV Life Annual Drama Awards	Best Supporting Actor	Super Rich	Won	
2022	GQ JAPAN Men of The Year 2022	Best Breakthrough Actor		Won	
