= No Longer Heroine =

Japanese manga series

- Cover of the first tankōbon volume, featuring Hatori Matsuzaki

ヒロイン失格 (Hiroin Shikkaku)
- Genre: Romance, Slice of life
- Manga
- Written by: Momoko Kōda
- Published by: Shueisha
- English publisher: NA: Yen Press
- Magazine: Bessatsu Margaret
- Original run: March 13, 2010 – March 13, 2013
- Volumes: 10
- Live-action film

Heroine Disqualified
- Directed by: Tsutomu Hanabusa
- Written by: Erika Yoshida
- Music by: Masaru Yokoyama
- Studio: Dub
- Released: September 19, 2015
- Runtime: 112 minutes

No Longer Heroine (Japanese: ヒロイン失格, Hepburn: Hiroin Shikkaku) is a Japanese manga series written and illustrated by Momoko Kōda. It was serialized in Shueisha's shōjo manga magazine Bessatsu Margaret from March 2010 to March 2013, with its chapters compiled into ten tankōbon volumes. A live action film adaptation was released on September 19, 2015, with Mirei Kiritani and Kento Yamazaki starring as Hatori Matsuzaki and Rita Terasaka, respectively.

== Plot ==
Hatori Matsuzaki is a colourful freshman high school student who has harboured a deep crush on her childhood friend, the aloof Rita Terasaka, for several years. She is initially content with just being Rita's friend, as she believes no one else is more suited to the role of being Rita's 'heroine' than her –, however, her beliefs are shattered when Rita begins to pursue a serious relationship with the bespectacled, awkward Miho Adachi. Hatori attempts several times to thwart the budding relationship between the two and eventually confesses her love to Rita, but is rejected. She also meets Kosuke Hiromitsu, a playful womaniser who notices that Rita cares for Hatori and begins an off-hand relationship with her to irritate him, but eventually develops serious feelings for her. Later on, Adachi decides to travel abroad for 3 months for journalism work. Hatori and Rita go to a festival together at the end of summer, where Rita notices his growing feelings for Hatori and kisses her. The two become romantically involved, until Adachi returns earlier than expected. Upon finding out that Rita kissed Hatori, she becomes heartbroken and collapses from anemia a few days later. Rita, out of guilt, breaks off his romance with Hatori and decides to stay with Adachi. A distressed Hatori decides to forget about Rita and pursue a much more serious relationship with Hiromitsu.

Although initially resolving to stay with Adachi, Rita finds it increasingly difficult to forget Hatori, and eventually breaks up with Adachi, who stops coming to school as a result. Hatori finds that she genuinely has feelings for Hiromitsu and enjoys being with him, but she cannot stop thinking about Rita and is jealous when her best friend, Kyoko Nakajima, becomes close with him, which strains her relationship with Hiromitsu. Rita resolves to no longer be half-hearted with his feelings and begins to seriously chase Hatori, confusing the latter. Things become even more complicated when Hiromitsu starts working part-time with an upperclassman who develops feelings for him, causing Hatori to become bitter and jealous. Hiromitsu grows increasingly exasperated with Hatori, and, unable to deal with her insecurity and involvement with Rita, breaks up with her.

At the same time, Adachi returns, now a carefree flirt in a string of sexual and abusive relationships. Rita decides once again to stay by Adachi's side out of guilt. Hatori, disappointed by Rita's sudden disinterest in her, resolves to stay single and forget about her previous relationships. However, after talking to her mother, she realises that she still loves Rita. Hiromitsu, after a pep talk with his cousin, decides to try and rekindle his relationship with Hatori, but she carefully rejects him. Hatori pursues Rita and publicly confesses to him once more. Rita is initially hesitant to leave Adachi, but the latter assures him that she will be fine on her own. Rita and Hatori then reunite, finally becoming a couple.

== Characters ==
Hatori Matsuzaki (松崎 はとり, Matsuzaki Hatori)
Portrayed by: Mirei Kiritani
The main protagonist and self-proclaimed heroine, Hatori is a bombastic, colorful, and impulsive freshman high school student who is in love with her childhood friend, Rita. She is insecure and at times self-centered, requiring her constant advice from her best friend, Nakajima. Her attempt to declare her love is hindered when Rita goes on a relationship with Adachi, and his subsequent rejection causes Hatori to pursue an initially shallow relationship with Hiromitsu that turns permanent, though Hatori eventually realizes that while she adores Hiromitsu, Rita will always be her foremost love, and in the series finale, she confesses to him in a more stalwart state, which he reciprocates.
Rita Terasaka (寺坂 利太, Terasaka Rita)
Portrayed by: Kento Yamazaki
Hatori's childhood friend and self-proclaimed hero, Rita, met Hatori when they were 10 years old, shortly after his mother left him to marry a younger man. Rita develops an aloof outlook as a result, thinking that he should not pursue a serious relationship with anyone under fear that they would leave him eventually. Despite this, his friendship with Hatori is unbreakable, thanks to Rita's continuing admiration of Hatori's declaration to be with him at all time. While he pursues a relationship with Adachi, which only lasts for a short while, Rita realizes that he does have feelings for Hatori, which is further ignited when Hatori goes out with Hiromitsu. In the final chapter, Rita reciprocates Hatori's love confession, and the two go out on a date soon after.
Kosuke Hiromitsu (弘光 廣祐, Hiromitsu Kōsuke)
Portrayed by: Kentaro Sakaguchi
Hatori's schoolmate whose athletic build thanks to being a basketball ace and angelic face are often compared by Hatori to "KakiP of NYAS" (a parody of YamaP, a former member of the boy band NEWS). Initially a shameless womanizer who goes out with women who take a liking to his looks, Hiromitsu takes an interest in Hatori, who initially rejects him during her attempt to woo Rita. This affection turns into love, and Hiromitsu and Hatori become a couple eventually. Their relationship is hampered, however, with Hatori's insecurities, leading to their breakup. While Hiromitsu is convinced by Ryosuke to give it a second chance, he eventually concedes to Hatori's ultimate choice to pursue Rita.
Kyoko Nakajima (中島 杏子, Nakajima Kyōko)
Portrayed by: Ayano Fukuda
Hatori's best friend and voice of reason. Playing the role of straight man, Nakajima provides advice to Hatori about her love life, which at times are sarcastic, mostly because she is annoyed at Hatori's immaturity and lack of common sense. Nevertheless, Nakajima genuinely cares for Hatori and voices concern when she is down. In the middle of the series, Nakajima briefly takes an interest to Rita, who at that time has just broken up with Adachi, but when she realizes that Hatori becomes deeply jealous, she drops the issue for Hatori's sake.
Miho Adachi (安達 未帆, Adachi Miho)
Portrayed by: Miwako Wagatsuma
A bespectacled girl Rita dates after he saves her from two bullies. Hatori considers her as the "perfect heroine", contrasting with her own "evil heroine" persona. She was once awkward and a loner, but with Rita's encouragement, she opens up and even trades her glasses with contacts. Adachi is hopelessly polite as she always respects Hatori and Rita's true feelings for each other despite the fact that they hurt her. When Rita breaks up with her, Adachi is depressed but takes it in stride. She subsequently vanishes for most of the series until near the end, when she returns with a wild and carefree dispositions, something that Rita is worried at. Despite going on abusive relationships, Adachi refuses to be pitied at and tells Rita to find his own happiness, leading him to reciprocate Hatori's confession in the end.
Moe Hiromitsu (弘光 萌, Hiromitsu Moe)
Hiromitsu's cousin who becomes a close friend to Hatori. She, Hatori, Rita, and Nakajima were in the same middle school, although Hatori did not know her until the field trip of the freshman high school year. Moe briefly becomes Hatori's rival in attracting Rita, but when Moe finds out that the two are incompatible, she decides to support Hatori's attempt to woo Rita.

== Media ==
=== Manga ===
Written and illustrated by Momoko Kōda, No Longer Heroine was serialized in Shueisha's shōjo manga magazine Bessatsu Margaret from March 13, 2010, to March 13, 2013. Shueisha has compiled its chapters into individual tankōbon volumes. Ten volumes were published from August 2010 to May 2013.

It is published in French by Delcourt and in English by Yen Press.

No.	Original release date	Original ISBN	English release date	English ISBN
1	August 25, 2010	978-4-08-846560-9	August 23, 2022	978-1-975-34648-5
2	December 24, 2010	978-4-08-846606-4	January 17, 2023	978-1-975-34650-8
3	April 25, 2011	978-4-08-846646-0	June 20, 2023	978-1-975-34652-2
4	August 25, 2011	978-4-08-846689-7	September 19, 2023	978-1-975-34654-6
5	December 22, 2011	978-4-08-846730-6	January 23, 2024	978-1-975-34657-7
6	March 23, 2012	978-4-08-846757-3	April 16, 2024	978-1-975-34658-4
7	June 25, 2012	978-4-08-846788-7	July 23, 2024	978-1-975-34660-7
8	October 25, 2012	978-4-08-846846-4	December 10, 2024	978-1-975-34662-1
9	February 25, 2013	978-4-08-846895-2	April 22, 2025	978-1-975-34664-5
10	May 24, 2013	978-4-08-845045-2	September 23, 2025	978-1-975-34666-9

=== Film ===
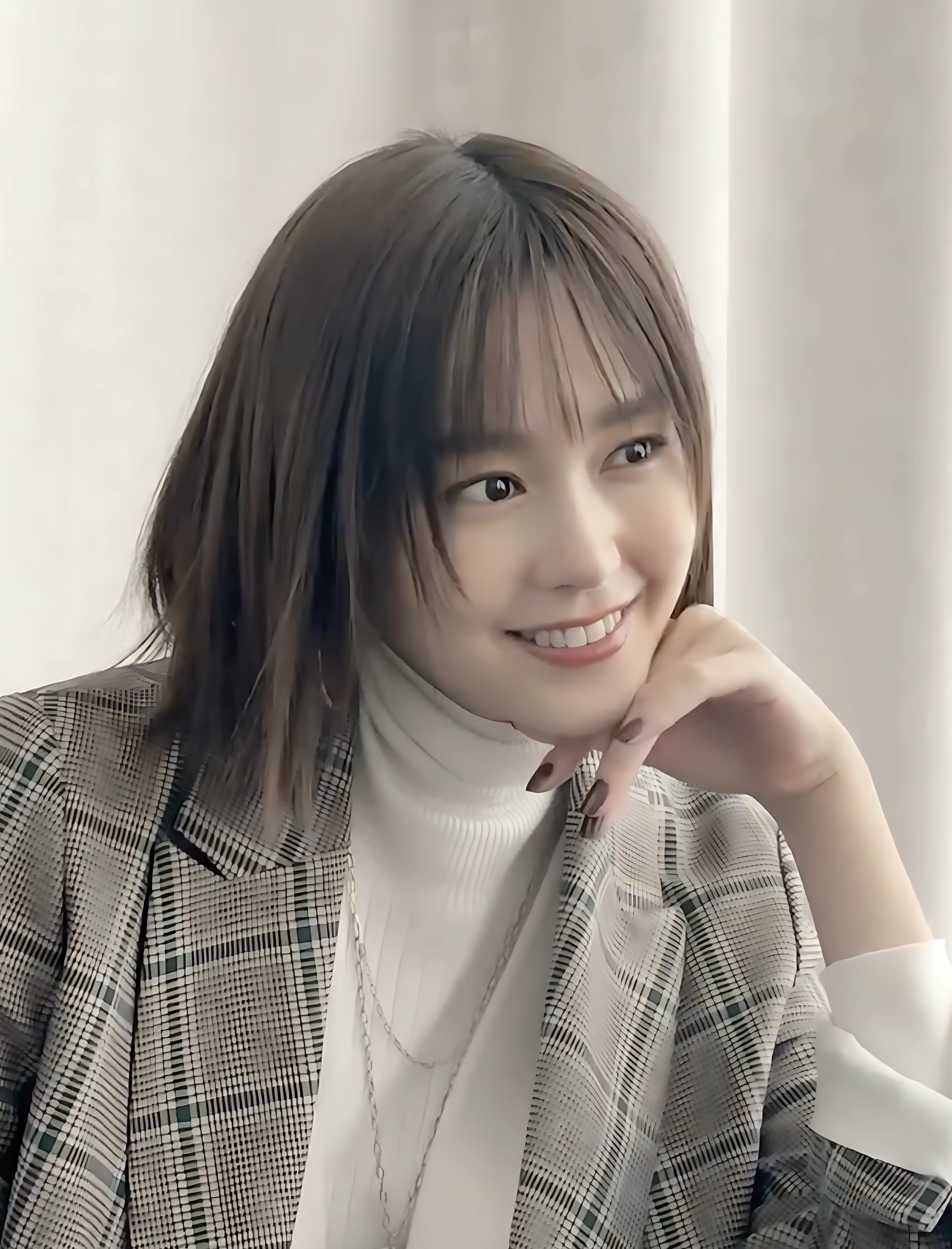
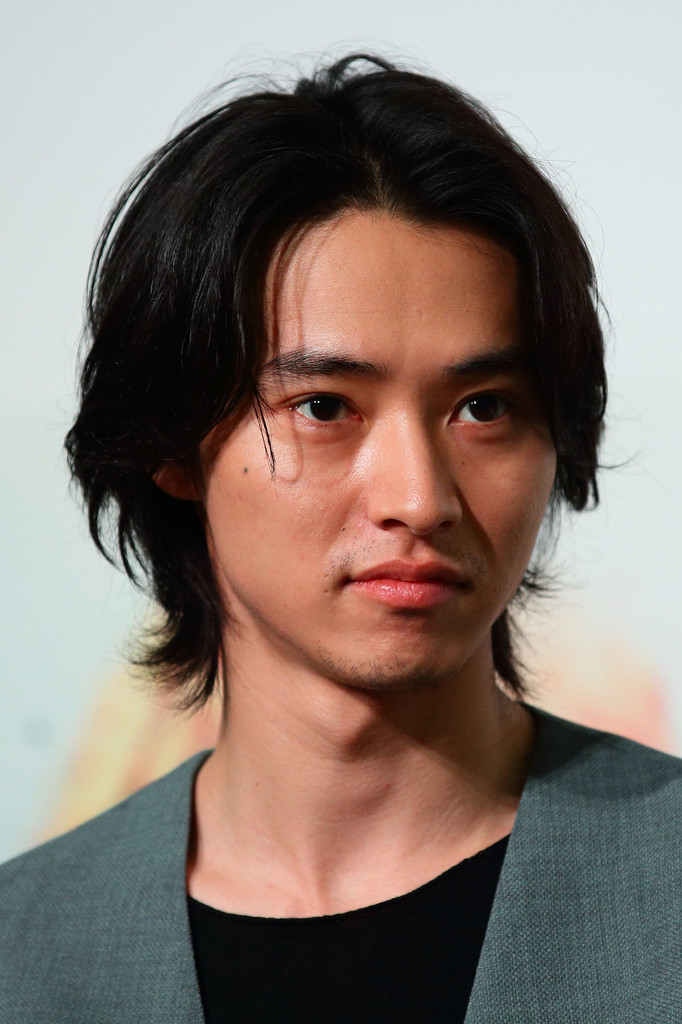
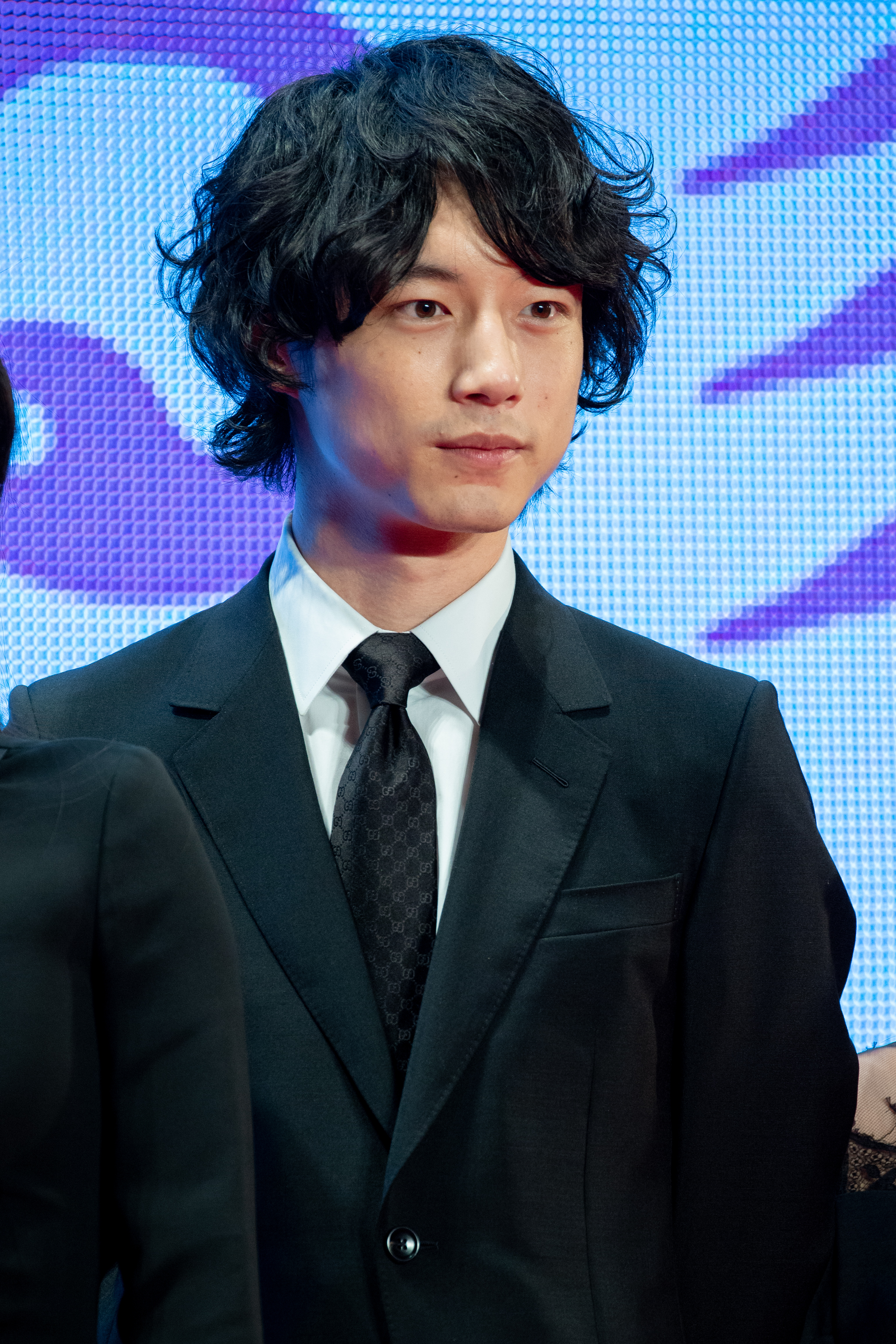
(from L to R) Mirei Kiritani, Kento Yamazaki, and Kentaro Sakaguchi starred as Hatori, Rita, and Kosuke Hiromitsu, respectively.

A live-action film adaptation (titled Heroine Disqualified outside Japan) was released in theaters nationwide in Japan on September 19, 2015, starring Mirei Kiritani, Kento Yamazaki, and Kentaro Sakaguchi. The film features "Torisetsu" by Kana Nishino as the theme song.

The film was a box office success, premiering #1 at the Japanese box office, overtaking the 2015 film Attack on Titan. The film earned US$20.5 million.

== Reception ==
=== Sales ===
Volume 7 has sold 40,276 copies (as of July 1, 2012), volume 8 has sold 35,408 copies (as of October 28, 2012), volume 9 has sold 45,803 copies (as of March 2, 2013), and volume 10 has sold 61,346 copies (as of June 2, 2013).

=== Box office ===
The live-action film premiered #1 at the Japanese box office, overtaking the 2015 film Attack on Titan. the film earned US$20.5 million.

== See also ==
- My Special One, another manga series by Momoko Kōda.
- Sensei Kunshu, another manga series by Momoko Kōda.
