= International Drama Festival in Tokyo =

- Date: October
- Venue: Tokyo
- Country: Japan
- First award: 2008
- Website: j-ba.or.jp

The International Drama Festival in Tokyo (国際ドラマフェスティバル in TOKYO), is an annual award show for excellence in television drama production based in Tokyo, Japan. It is organized by the International Drama Festival in Tokyo Executive Committee and co-organized by the Ministry of Internal Affairs and Communications and the Ministry of Economy, Trade and Industry, and held every October. The award is called the "Tokyo Drama Award".

== Categories ==
Current Categories

- Series Drama
  - The Grand Prix
  - Excellent Award
- Single Drama
  - The Grand Prix
  - Excellent Award
- Local Drama award
- Personal Prize
  - Best Performance by an Actor
  - Best Performance by an Actress
  - Best Performance by an Actor in a Supporting Role
  - Best Performance by an Actress in a Supporting Role
  - Best Screenplay
  - Best Director
  - Theme Song Award
- Special Award for Foreign Drama

== Award winners ==
=== Domestic dramas (series drama) ===
==== The grand prix and acting awards ====
No.	Year	The Grand Prix	Excellent Award	Best Actor	Best Actress	Best Supporting Actor	Best Supporting Actress	Ref.
1	2008	Pandora		Kōichi Satō (Kaze no Hate)	Juri Ueno (Last Friends)	Masato Sakai (Atsuhime)	Emi Wakui (Chiritotechin)	
2	2009	Love and Forgiveness	Rookies; Garden of Breeze; Ordinary Miracles; The Flying Tire	Kiichi Nakai (Garden of Breeze)	Yūki Amami (Boss)	Kenichi Endō (Kiri no Hi)	Erika Toda (Ties of Shooting Stars)	
2	2009	Love and Forgiveness	Rookies; Garden of Breeze; Ordinary Miracles; The Flying Tire	Best New Actor: Junpei Mizobata / Best New Actress: Umika Kawashima				
3	2010	Jin (Season 1)	Mother; Class Reunion: Love Again Syndrome; Care Worker Gang; Ryōmaden	Takao Osawa (Jin)	Yasuko Matsuyuki (Mother)	Teruyuki Kagawa (Ryōmaden)	Machiko Ono (Mother and Hi no Sakana)	
4	2011	Job Hopper Buy a House	Second Virgin; Q10; Jin (Season 2); Love Strikes!: The Series	Kazunari Ninomiya (Freeter, Ie wo Kau)	Kyōka Suzuki (Second Virgin), Mana Ashida (The Tradition of Malmo)	Masaaki Uchino (Jin)	Hikari Mitsushima (Moteki)	
5	2012	I'm Mita, Your Housekeeper	Carnation; Humanoid Monster Bem; Legal High; Still, Life Goes On; Penance	Masato Sakai (Legal High)	Machiko Ono (Carnation)	Hiroki Hasegawa (I'm Mita, Your Housekeeper)	Anne Watanabe (Humanoid Monster Bem)	
6	2013	Amachan	Carry On! Hara-chan! Doctor X Tonbi; Solitary Gourmet (Season 2); Galileo	Eita (Matrimonial Chaos)	Rena Nōnen (Amachan)	Gō Ayano (Matrimonial Chaos)	Kyōko Koizumi (Amachan)	
7	2014	Hanzawa Naoki	Bon Appetit! Woman: My Life for My Children; Border; Mozu; First Class	Masato Sakai (Hanzawa Naoki)	Hikari Mitsushima (Woman: My Life for My Children)	Kōtarō Yoshida (Hanako and Anne)	Satomi Ishihara (Heartbroken Chocolatier)	
8	2015	The Emperor's Cook	Massan; I'm Taking the Day Off; Aoi Honō; Date	Takeru Satoh (The Emperor's Cook)	Haru Kuroki (The Emperor's Cook)	Ryohei Suzuki (The Emperor's Cook)	Yō Yoshida (Hero)	
9	2016	Here Comes Asa	We're Millennials Got a Problem? Tamiō; Downtown Rocket; Tsuribaka Nisshi; Love That Makes You Cry; Shizumanu Taiyō	Hiroshi Abe (Downtown Rocket)	Haru (Here Comes Asa)	Dean Fujioka (Here Comes Asa)	Yoshino Kimura (My Dangerous Wife)	
10	2017	The Full-Time Wife Escapist	Sanada Maru; Your Home is My Business! Quartet; The Supporting Actors; Crisis: Special Security Squad	Masato Sakai (Sanada Maru)	Yui Aragaki (The Full-Time Wife Escapist)	Masao Kusakari (Sanada Maru)	Riisa Naka (I Love You Just a Little Bit)	
11	2018	Ossan's Love	Hiyokko; Overprotected Kahoko; Unnatural; The Confidence Man JP; Ishitsubute	Kei Tanaka (Ossan's Love)	Satomi Ishihara (Unnatural)	Kōtarō Yoshida (Ossan's Love)	Sawako Agawa (Rikuō)	
12	2019	Mr. Hiiragi's Homeroom	An Invisible Cradle; Dele; Don't Forget Me; What Did You Eat Yesterday?	Masaki Suda (Mr. Hiiragi's Homeroom)	Kaya Kiyohara (An Invisible Cradle)	Ryusei Yokohama (A Story to Read When You First Fall in Love)	Haru Kuroki (Weakest Beast)	
13	2020	Idaten	You Can't Expense This! Your Turn to Kill; If Talking Paid; Nagi's Long Vacation; An Incurable Case of Love; Hospital Refomer [sic]	Toma Ikuta (If Talking Paid)	Haru Kuroki (Nagi's Long Vacation)	Takeru Satoh (An Incurable Case of Love)	Sairi Ito (You Can't Expense This!)	
14	2021	Story of My Family!!!	Life's Punchline; MIU404; Hanzawa Naoki (S2); Heaven and Hell: Soul Exchange; My Dear Exes; The Grand Family	Masataka Kubota (Yell)	Haruka Ayase (Heaven and Hell: Soul Exchange)	Toshiyuki Nishida (Story of My Family!!!)	Noriko Eguchi (Story of My Family!!!)	
15	2022	Dearest	Come Come Everybody; Love's in Sight! Emergency Interrogation Room (S4); Chef Detective; Don't Call It Mystery; Hey Handsome!!	Masaki Suda (Don't Call It Mystery)	Yuriko Yoshitaka (Dearest)	Joe Odagiri (Come Come Everybody)	Wakana Matsumoto (Involvement in Family Affairs)	
16	2023	Rebooting	The 13 Lords of the Shogun; On a Starry Night; Silent; Elpis; Fence	Shun Oguri (The 13 Lords of the Shogun)	Haruna Kawaguchi (Silent)	Ren Meguro (Silent)	Kaho (Silent)	
17	2024	Vivant	The Great Passage; Swallows; Extremely Inappropriate! Unmet: A Neurosurgeon's Diary	Tsuyoshi Kusanagi (Deaf Voice: A Sign-Language Interpreter in Court)	Shizuka Ishibashi (Swallows)	Ryuya Wakaba (Unmet: A Neurosurgeon's Diary)	Yuki Uchida (Swallows)	
18	2025	The Diamond Sleeping Under the Sea	Unbound; Tokyo Saladbowl; The Hot Spot; Mr. Mikami's Classroom; Until I Destroyed My Husband's Other Family; A Calm Sea and Beautiful Days with You; Golden Kamuy: The Hunt of Prisoners in Hokkaido	Tori Matsuzaka (Mr. Mikami's Classroom)	Nao (Tokyo Saladbowl)	Akihiro Kakuta (The Hot Spot)	Hana Sugisaki (The Diamond Sleeping Under the Sea)	

==== Other categories ====
No.	Year	Award	Winner(s)	Ref.
1	2008	The Grand Prix (Single)	Points and Lines	
1	2008	Kids & Youth Dramas	Phone Braver Seven, Last Friends	
1	2008	Family Drama	Saitou-san	
1	2008	Costume Drama	Atsuhime	
1	2008	Non-Genre Drama	SP	
1	2008	Best Screenplay	Yumiko Inoue "Pandora"	
1	2008	Best Directors	Kan Ishibashi, Shunsaku Kawake	
1	2008	Special Award	Tetsuya Takeda and "Kinpachi-sensei" production staff	
1	2008	Special Award	"Points and Lines" art staff	
2	2009	Best Screenplay	Sou Kuramoto	
2	2009	Best Producer	Hisashi Tsugiya	
2	2009	Best Director	Rieko Miyamoto	
2	2009	Special Award	Ken Ogata	
2	2009	Special Award	Art staff ("The Penetrators-Kurobe no Taiyo-")	
2	2009	Special Award	Production staff "The Long hours Dramas (New Year's Historical Drama)"	
3	2010	Best Screenplay	Yuji Sakamoto "Mother"	
3	2010	Best Director	Hiroshi Kurosaki "Goldfish"	
3	2010	Best Producer	Akihiko Ishimaru "Jin"	
3	2010	Special Award	"Ryōmaden" filming staff	
3	2010	Special Award	Mana Ashida "Mother"	
3	2010	Best Actor in Asia	Lee Byung-hun	
4	2011	Best Screenplay	Shizuka Oishi "Second Virgin"	
4	2011	Best Director	Seiji Izumi "AIBOU: Tokyo Detective Duo season 9"	
4	2011	Best Producer	Fumi Hashimoto "JOB-HOPPER BUYS A HOUSE" "Marumo's Story"	
4	2011	Special Award	"Jin" production staff	
5	2012	Best Screenplay	Kazuhiko Yukawa "I'm Mita, Your Housekeeper"	
5	2012	Best Directors	Kiyoshi Kurosawa "Penance", Kenji Tanaka "Carnation"	
5	2012	Best Producer	Futoshi Ohira "I'm Mita, Your Housekeeper"	
5	2012	Special Award	Shinichi Ichikawa, "Cloud Above the Slope" production staff	
6	2013	Best Screenplay	Kankurō Kudō "Amachan"	
6	2013	Best Director	Tsuyoshi Inoue "Amachan"	
6	2013	Best Producer	Kei Kurube "Amachan"	
6	2013	Special Award	Yoshihide Otomo "Amachan"	
7	2014	Best Screenplay	Yoshikazu Okada "Second to Last Love 2"	
7	2014	Best Director	Katsuo Fukuzawa "Hanzawa Naoki"	
7	2014	Special Award	"Is Three Fellows" Cast: Kin'ya Kitaōji, Shigeru Izumiya, Kotaro Shiga	
7	2014	Special Award	Kitakyushu Film Commission (Co-operation on arranging locations for TV dramas, such as "Mozu")	
7	2014	Best Actor is Asia	Kim Soo Hyon	
8	2015	Best Screenplay	Miho Nakazono "Hanako and Anne"	
8	2015	Best Producer	Yasuo Yagi "Fathers"	
8	2015	Best Director	Tetsuaki Matsue, Nobuhiro Yamashita "Takayuki Yamada's Tokyo Akabane"	
8	2015	Special Award	Charlotte Kate Fox "Massan"	
9	2016	Best Directors	Yuya Ishii "Taro's Candy House", Nobuhiro Doi "Sleepeeer hit!", "Kounodori: Dr. Stork"	
9	2016	Theme Song Award	Aoi Teshima "Asu e no Tegami" (Love That Makes You Cry)	
10	2017	Best Screenplay	Sou Kuramoto	
10	2017	Best Producer	Atsushi Nasuda	
10	2017	Best Director	Fuminori Kaneko	
10	2017	Theme Song Award	Gen Hoshino "Koi" (The Full-Time Wife Escapist)	
11	2018	Best Screenplay	Akiko Nogi "Unnatural"	
11	2018	Best Director	Ayuko Tsukahara "Unnatural"	
11	2018	Special Award	"Unnatural" production team	
11	2018	Theme Song Award	Kenshi Yonezu "Lemon" (Unnatural)	
12	2019	Best Screenplay	Naoko Adachi	
12	2019	Best Director	Yuichi Fukuda	
12	2019	Theme Song Award	Milet "inside you" (QUEEN)	
13	2020	Best Screenplay	Shigeki Kaneko	
13	2020	Best Director	Ayuko Tsukahara	
13	2020	Theme Song Award	Official Hige Dandism "I LOVE..." (An Incurable Case of Love)	
14	2021	Best Screenplay	Yuji Sakamoto	
14	2021	Best Director	Takegoro Nishimura	
14	2021	Theme Song Award	STUTS & Takako Matsu with 3exes "Presence" (My Dear Exes)	
14	2021	Special Award	Sugako Hashida	
15	2022	Best Screenplay	Yuki Fujimoto	
15	2022	Best Director	Ayuko Tsukahara	
15	2022	Theme Song Award	Ai "Aldebaran" (Come Come Everybody)	

=== Foreign dramas ===
Year	Special Awards	Ref.
2007	(South Korea) A Dwarf Launches a Small Ball (China) New Age of Marriage (Thailand) Heart of Chocolate	
2008	(China) Soldiers Sortie (Indonesia) Searching for God (South Korea) Golden Bride (Vietnam) Chạy án (Buying Justice）	
2009	(China) Ma Wen's War (India) Child Bride — Strong Relationships of Tender Age (South Korea) Beethoven Virus (Malaysia) The Unbreakable Bond	
2010	(China) A Beautiful Daughter-in-law Era (India) Sacred Relationship (South Korea) Iris (Singapore) Red Thread	
2011	(China) Three Kingdoms (South Korea) Dream High (Thailand) Wanida	
2012	(Thailand) Roy Mai (Silk Trace) (South Korea) Deep Rooted Tree (China) Naked Wedding	
2013	(Indonesia) The Rainbow Troops: The Series (South Korea) The King's Doctor (Thailand) Warlord	
2014	(Indonesia) Tukang Bubur Naik Haji The Series (Porridge Seller Pilgrimage) (South Korea) My Love from the Star (Thailand) Thong Neua Kao (Pure Gold)	
2015	(Indonesia) Akankah Bunda Datang Ke Pernikahanku? (Mother, Will You Come to My Wedding?) (South Korea) Misaeng - Incomplete Life (Thailand) Samee Teetra (The Marked Husband)	
2016	(South Korea) Six Flying Dragons (Thailand) Sud Kaen Saen Rak (Vietnam) Quyến Rũ	
2017	(Thailand) Nakee (Queen of Nagas) (Vietnam) Chiều ngang qua phố cũ (Turkey) Mother	
2018	(Taiwan) A Boy Named Flora A (Turkey) Kadın (Vietnam) Lẩn khuất một tên người (Hidden Name)	
2019	(China) My True Friend (Korea) The Fiery Priest (Thailand) Love Destiny	
2020	(China) Serenade of Peaceful Joy (South Korea) Crash Landing on You (Thailand) Krong Kam (Repercussion）	
2021	(Korea) Vincenzo (Taiwan) The Making of an Ordinary Woman 2 (Thailand) 2gether: The series	
2021	(Indonesia) Broken Kite (Taiwan) Twisted Strings (Thailand) A Tale of Thousand Stars	

== See also ==
- List of Asian television awards
- Seoul International Drama Awards
- Shanghai Television Festival
