= The Crimes That Bind (2018 film) =

- Directed by: Katsuo Fukuzawa
- Screenplay by: Lee Jeong Mi
- Based on: Inori no Maku ga Oriru toki by Keigo Higashino
- Starring: Hiroshi Abe; Nanako Matsushima; Junpei Mizobata; Rena Tanaka; Midoriko Kimura; Setsuko Karasuma; Shunpūtei Shōta; Mitsuhiro Oikawa; Ran Ito; Fumiyo Kohinata; Tsutomu Yamazaki
- Cinematography: Masahiro Suda
- Edited by: Masashi Asahara
- Music by: Yugo Kanno
- Production companies: Toho; Tokyo Broadcasting System; Mainichi Broadcasting System; Dentsu; Kodansha; Mainichi Shimbun; Pony Canyon; Shigeta Office; Pivot Plus Music; Chubu-Nippon Broadcasting; RKB Mainichi Broadcasting; Tohoku Broadcasting Company; Hokkaido Broadcasting; TBS Radio
- Distributed by: Toho
- Release date: January 27, 2018
- Running time: 119 minutes
- Country: Japan
- Language: Japanese
- Box office: $23.2 million

The Crimes That Bind (祈りの幕が下りる時, Inori no Maku ga Oriru Toki; "When the Prayer Curtain Falls") is a 2018 Japanese crime drama film directed by Katsuo Fukuzawa based on the novel by Keigo Higashino.

== Plot ==
The film centers around the discovery of the body of Michiko Oshitani. Clues, including handwriting at the scene, link her death to the death of the mother of the main character, Kyoichiro Kaga.

== Cast ==
- Hiroshi Abe as Kyoichiro Kaga
- Nanako Matsushima as Hiromi Asai
  - Marie Iitoyo as young Hiromi (20 years old)
  - Hiyori Sakurada as young Hiromi (14 years old)
- Junpei Mizobata as Shūhei Matsumiya
- Rena Tanaka
- Midoriko Kimura
- Setsuko Karasuma
- Shunpūtei Shōta
- Shōzō Uesugi
- Kunihiro Suda
- Takuma Otoo
- Hiroko Nakajima
- Toshiaki Megumi (cameo)
- Anne Watanabe (cameo)
- Teruyuki Kagawa (cameo)
- Mitsuhiro Oikawa
- Ran Ito
- Fumiyo Kohinata as Tadao Asai
- Tsutomu Yamazaki as Takamasa Kaga

== Box office ==
The film took in USD $13 million in its Japanese Box Office run. It earned an additional $9,886,245 in China and $197,883 in Hong Kong, bringing its worldwide box office total to $23.2 million.

== See also ==
- Shinzanmono
- The Wings of the Kirin
- Nemuri no Mori
