= Mozu =

Mozu may refer to:

== Geography ==
- Mozu (Bull-headed shrike) Japanese bird:
- Mozu kofungun (百舌鳥 古墳群) tombs in Sakai, Osaka Prefecture
- Mozu Station (百舌鳥 駅, Mozu-eki) railway station on the Hanwa Line in Sakai-ku, Sakai, Osaka Prefecture
  - Nakamozu Station

== Entertainment ==
- Mozu (novels), by Go Osaka
- Mozu (TV series) Japanese police television drama series 2014
- Mozu (film), 2015 Japanese suspense action film

== See also ==
- Mozi (墨子) Chinese philosopher
