= Yuji Sakamoto =

Japanese screenwriter (born 1967)

- Born: 12 May 1967 (age 58); Osaka, Japan
- Occupation: Writer
- Spouse: Yoko Moriguchi (m. 1998)

Yūji Sakamoto (坂元裕二, Sakamoto Yūji; born 12 May 1967) is a Japanese screenwriter, lyricist, and playwright.

== Early life ==
Yūji Sakamoto was born on 12 May 1967 in Osaka.

== Career ==
At the age of 19, Sakamoto won the 1st Fuji TV Young Scenario Award. At the age of 23, he wrote the screenplay for Tokyo Love Story. In 1996 he wrote the script for the Dreamcast audio drama game Real Sound: Kaze no Regret with Kenji Eno. This game was specially developed for blind and visually impaired players. He has written the scripts for many popular Japanese television dramas, including Our Textbook, Still, Life Goes On, Matrimonial Chaos, Mother, Woman, The Best Divorce, and Quartet. Many of his works have been remade in international productions. His recent works include Anone, My Dear Exes, and Love with a Case. His filmography includes We Made a Beautiful Bouquet (2021), starring Masaki Suda and Kasumi Arimura. Sakamoto wrote the screenplay for Hirokazu Kore-eda's film Monster (2023). It was the first time since his feature film debut Maborosi (1995) that Kore-eda was not responsible for the screenplay. The two had expressed a mutual respect for each other's work and had attended the same school when they were younger. Monster premiered at the 2023 Cannes Film Festival, where Sakamoto won the Best Screenplay award.

In April 2016, he was appointed as a professor at the Tokyo University of the Arts's Graduate School of Film and New Media.

In 2017, Sakamoto won the Best Screenwriter award at the 92nd Television Drama Academy Awards for his work on the drama Quartet.

In April 2023, Sakamoto was awarded a Medal of Honor with Purple Ribbon and in May 2023, he won the Cannes Film Festival Award for Best Screenplay for Monster.

Sakomoto wrote and produced In Love and Deep Water for Netflix, and the film premiered in 2023. He and Netflix signed a five-year collaboration agreement in June 2023.

== Personal life ==
In 1998, Sakamoto married actress Yoko Moriguchi.

== Filmography ==
=== Television ===
Year	Title	Notes
1989	Dōkyūsei	
1990	Nippon-ichi no Kattobi Otoko	
1991	Tokyo Love Story	
1992	Hatachi no Yakusoku	
1996	Tsubasa o Kudasai!	
2002	Remote	
2003	Anata no Tonari ni Dare ka Iru	
2004	Itoshi Kimi e	
2004	Last Christmas	
2006	Saiyūki	
2006	Top Caster	
2007	Our Textbook	
2008	Ryokiteki na Kanojo	
2008	Taiyo to Umi no Kyoshitsu	
2010	Cheisu: Kokuzei sasatsukan	
2010	Mother	
2011	Soredemo, Ikite Yuku	
2012	Makete, Katsu: Sengo o Tsukutta Otoko Shigeru Yoshida	
2013	The Best Divorce	
2013	Woman	
2014	Mosaic Japan	
2014	Oyaji no Senaka	Episode: "Wedding Match"
2015	Mondai no Aru Restaurant	
2016	Love That Makes You Cry	
2017	Quartet	
2018	Anone	
2021	My Dear Exes	
2022	Love with a Case	

=== Film ===
Year	Title	Director	Notes
1996	Yuri	Yuji Sakamoto	
1998	Tokyo Eyes	Jean-Pierre Limosin	
2004	Crying Out Love in the Center of the World	Isao Yukisada	
2005	Gimî hebun	Toru Matsuura	
2007	Saiyūki	Kensaku Sawada	
2021	We Made a Beautiful Bouquet	Nobuhiro Doi	
2023	Monster	Hirokazu Kore-eda	
2023	In Love and Deep Water	Yusuke Taki	
2025	1st Kiss	Ayuko Tsukahara	
2025	Unreachable	Nobuhiro Doi	
