= Fumiyo Kohinata =

Japanese actor (born 1954)

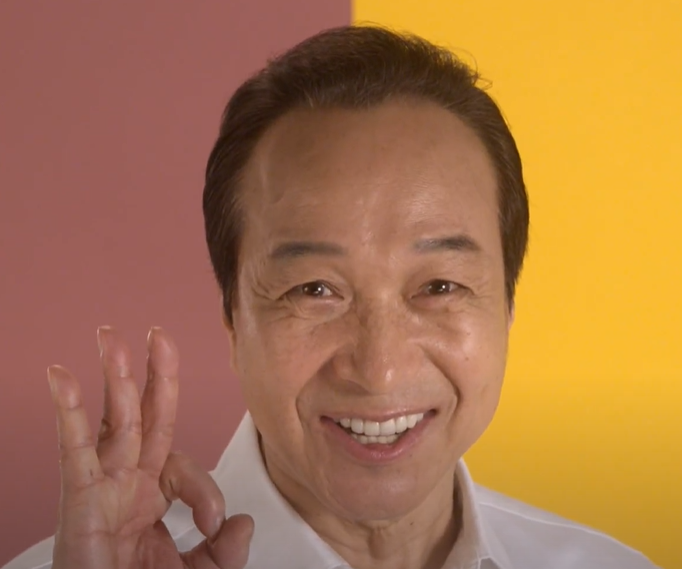
- Born: January 23, 1954 (age 72); Mikasa, Hokkaido, Japan
- Occupation: Actor
- Years active: 1977–present
- Children: Seiichi Kohinata; Shunpei Kohinata

Fumiyo Kohinata (小日向 文世, Kohinata Fumiyo; born January 23, 1954 in Mikasa, Hokkaido, Japan) is a Japanese actor.

== Filmography ==
=== Film ===
- Begging for Love (1998)
- Give It All (1998)
- Ring 2 (1999), Dr. Kawajiri
- Audition (1999), Television producer
- Minna no Ie (2001)
- Turn (2001)
- Dark Water (2002), Kunio Hamada
- The Mars Canon (2002), Kōhei Deguchi
- Casshern (2004), Professor Kōzuki
- 69 (2004), Yoshioka
- Swing Girls (2004), Yasumi Suzuki (Tomoko's father)
- Kagen no Tsuki (2004), Anzai
- Be with You (2004), Dr. Noguchi
- Ashurajō no Hitomi (2005), Nanboku Tsuruya IV
- Always Sanchōme no Yūhi (2005), Kawabuchi
- Rainbow Song (2006), Yasujirō Satō
- I Just Didn't Do It (2007), Shōgo Muroyama
- Hero (2007), Takayuki Suetsugu
- Always Zoku Sanchōme no Yūhi (2007), Kawabuchi
- My Girlfriend Is a Cyborg (2008), TV Reporter
- The Magic Hour (2008), Kenjūrō Hasegawa
- Happy Flight (2008), Sadao Mochizuki
- K-20: Legend of the Mask (2008)
- Goemon (2009), Yashichi
- Sideways (2009), Michio Saito
- About Her Brother (2010), Susumu Komiyama
- Outrage (2010), Detective Kataoka
- Sword of Desperation (2010), Hoshina Jūnai
- Smuggler (2011), Kenji Nishio
- A Ghost of a Chance (2011), Jōji Danda
- Ace Attorney (2012), Kōtarō Haine
- Beyond Outrage (2012), Detective Kataoka
- The Kiyosu Conference (2013), Niwa Nagahide
- Akumu-chan (2014), Bannosuke Kotō
- Lady Maiko (2014), Kanpachiro Ichikawa
- Solomon's Perjury 1: Suspicion (2015), Tsuzaki
- Solomon's Perjury 2: Judgment (2015), Tsuzaki
- Mozu The Movie (2015)
- Persona Non Grata (2015)
- Prophecy (2015)
- Fullmetal Alchemist (2017), Hakuro
- Survival Family (2017), Yoshiyuki Suzuki
- Mixed Doubles (2017)
- Mary and the Witch's Flower (2017), Doctor Dee (voice)
- The Crimes That Bind (2018), Tadao Asai
- Restaurant from the Sky (2018)
- Masquerade Hotel (2019)
- Kazokuwari (2019)
- The Confidence Man JP: The Movie (2019), Richard
- The Great War of Archimedes (2019), Sekizō Uno
- Talking the Pictures (2019)
- The Confidence Man JP: Episode of the Princess (2020), Richard
- Caution, Hazardous Wife: The Movie (2021)
- The Confidence Man JP: Episode of the Hero (2022), Richard
- Masquerade Night (2021)
- It's in the Woods (2022)
- Yudo: The Way of the Bath (2023)
- Ichikei's Crow: The Movie (2023), Yoshio Komazawa
- We're Broke, My Lord! (2023), Magaki Sakubei
- The Voices at War (2024), Hiroshi Shimomura
- Sunset Sunrise (2025)
- The Final Piece (2025), Koichiro Karasawa
- Emergency Interrogation Room: The Final Movie (2025), Haruo Koishikawa
- Kyojo: Reunion (2026)
- Kyojo: Requiem (2026)
- Goodbye, My Loved Ones! (2026), Hiroshi Kato

=== Television dramas ===
- Mōri Motonari (1997), Kimura
- Tokugawa Yoshinobu (1998), Nishi Amane
- Rokubanme no Sayoko (2000), Mita
- Hero (2001), Takayuki Suetsugu
- Shinsengumi! (2004), Satō Hikogorō
- Kisarazu Cat's Eye (2002), Kōsuke Tabuchi
- Boku no Ikiru Michi (2003), Benzō Kaneda
- Orange Days (2004), Professor Sakaida
- Water Boys 2 (2004), Akira Yazawa
- Ruri no Shima (2005), Teruaki Yonemori
- Ganbatte Ikimasshoi (2005), Mitsuru Nemoto
- Attention Please (2006), Shinya Sakurada
- Fūrin Kazan (2007), Suwa Yorishige
- Taiyo to Umi no Kyoshitsu (2008), Ryunosuke Kamiya
- 81diver (2008), Fuhito Suzuki
- Jin (2009), Katsu Kaishū
- Wagaya no Rekishi (2010), Nobusuke Kishi
- Hammer Session! (2010), Kenichi Mizuki
- Bull Doctor (2011), Nobuo Takeda
- Watashi wa Shadow (2011), Taisuke Fujimoto
- Akumu-chan (2012), Bannosuke Kotō
- Taira no Kiyomori (2012), Minamoto no Tameyoshi
- Doctors (2013), Professor Matsuda
- Hero (2014), Takayuki Suetsugu
- Emergency Interrogation Room (2014–2025), Haruo Koishikawa
- Mare (2015), Daigo Ikehata
- Sanada Maru (2016), Toyotomi Hideyoshi
- Love That Makes You Cry (2016), Seijirō Ibuki
- Sleepeeer Hit! (2016), Ryu Mikurayama
- The Prime Minister's Chef (2016), Prime Minister Ichirō Atō
- Miotsukushi Ryōrichō (2017)
- The Confidence Man JP (2018)
- The Supporting Actors 2 (2018)
- Legal V (2018)
- Tegami (2018)
- Maison de Police (2019)
- An Artist of the Floating World (2019)
- The Eternal Nispa (2019), Nabeshima Naomasa
- The Dangerous Venus (2020)
- Ichikei's Crow: The Criminal Court Judges (2021), Yoshio Komazawa
- Kyojo 2 (2021), Hideo Yomoda
- The Days (2023), Prime Minister of Japan
- Kazama Kimichika: Kyojo Zero (2023), Hideo Yomoda
- Vivant (2023–26), Toshihiko Nagano
- Worst to First: A Teen Baseball Miracle (2023)
- A Suffocatingly Lonely Death (2024), Jūzō Haikawa
- The Hot Spot (2025), Fumio Murakami
- Our Happy Family (2025), Konosuke Hirayama
- The Laughing Salesman (2025), Hikosaburo Okubo
- The Ghost Writer's Wife (2025–26), Matsuno Kan'emon
- Hakone Ekiden: Our Story (2026), Ken'ichiro Tamura
- Did Someone Happen to Mention Me? (2026), himself

=== Television animation ===
- Inuyashiki (2017) - Ichirō Inuyashiki

=== Japanese dub ===
- Ultraman: Rising (2024) - Professor Sato
