= Second Virgin (film) =

- Poster
- Directed by: Hiroshi Kurosaki
- Written by: Shizuka Oishi
- Produced by: Kanjiro Sakura
- Starring: Kyōka Suzuki; Kyoko Fukada; Hiroki Hasegawa
- Cinematography: Norimichi Kasamatsu
- Edited by: Hiroaki Morishita
- Music by: Hidehiko Urayama; Yōko Kumagai
- Production companies: Crossmedia; NHK; Sedic International; Gentosha; Amuse Inc.; Hakuhodo
- Distributed by: Shochiku
- Release date: September 23, 2011 (Japan)
- Running time: 105 minutes
- Country: Japan
- Language: Japanese

Second Virgin (Japanese: セカンドバージン), also translated as Second Virginity, is a 2011 Japanese drama film directed by Hiroshi Kurosaki.

== Cast ==
- Kyōka Suzuki
- Kyoko Fukada
- Hiroki Hasegawa

== See also ==
- Second Virgin
