= Anya Geraldine =

Indonesian actress (born 1995)

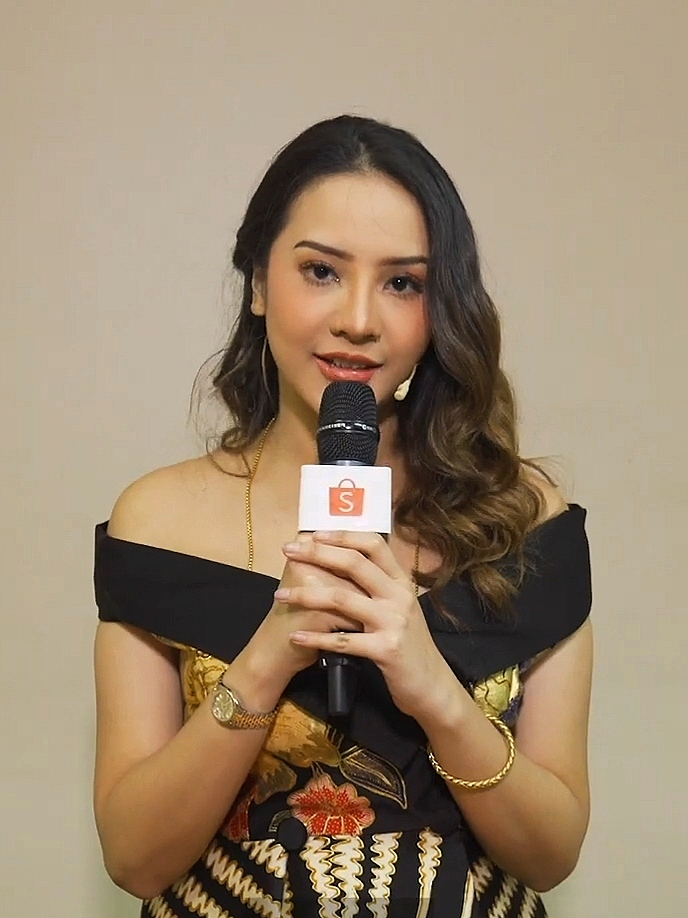
- Geraldine in 2019
- Born: Nur Amalina Hayati; 15 December 1995 (age 30); Jakarta, Indonesia.
- Education: SMA Negeri 4 Jakarta; Kalbis Institute
- Occupations: Actress; Model; Internet celebrity
- Years active: 2016 - present

Nur Amalina Hayati (born 15 December 1995), known as Anya Geraldine, is an Indonesian actress, internet celebrity, and model. Her career in entertainment began in 2016 as an internet celebrity and model. Anya Geraldine made her acting debut in the horor film Tusuk Jelangkung di Lubang Buaya (2018) and first received recognition in the film Yowis Ben 2 (2019) and the web series Pretty Little Liars Indonesia (2020). After that, she has starred in eight feature films, including Sabar Ini Ujian (2020), Selesai (2021) and Garis Waktu (2022).

== Early life ==
Anya Geraldine was born Nur Amalina Hayati in Jakarta, Indonesia. The name was given by her mother who wanted an Islamic name while her father wanted her to be named Anya Geraldine. Because of that, she was called Anya since she was a child. Anya Geraldine grew up in Cempaka Putih, Central Jakarta. At the age of five, her parents divorced. Then she lived with her mother and her younger brother. Anya Geraldine attended SDI At-Taubah then continued to SMP Perguruan Cikini. She graduated from SMA Negeri 4 Jakarta majoring in Social Studies in 2013 and then entered Kalbis Institute.

== Career ==
Being a model is one of Anya Geraldine's dreams from middle-school. Before being famous in entertainment, Anya Geraldine had been active in modelling. She once attended a modeling school founded by Kimmy Jayanti, the Kimmy Jayanti School.

Anya Geraldine began to be known to the public after uploading a vlog on her personal YouTube channel. Because of the video, she was called by the Indonesian Child Protection Commission (KPAI) for uploading her 'free' holiday style with her boyfriend. Since then she has been active as an internet celebrity. She has also received offers for advertisements, video clips and feature films.

In 2018, Anya Geraldine began to widen her career by entering the world of film. She acted in her first film as Mayang in the horror film Tusuk Jelangkung di Lubang Buaya (2018) produced by Max Pictures.

In 2019, Anya Geraldine acted in the Yowis Ben 2 (2019) directed by Bayu Skak and Fajar Nugros. She acted as Asih with Bayu as the main character. Since then, Anya Geraldine has started playing many films and web series, one of which is Sabar Ini Ujian (2020), directed by Anggy Umbara and Pretty Little Liars (2020) directed by Emil Heradi. She admitted that she wanted to focus on her career in the acting world.

In 2020, Rizky Febian invited Anya Geraldine to become a model for the video clip in the "Garis Cinta" trilogy. Her first video clip for song "Cuek", got 7 million views in ten days and made it to Indonesia's YouTube trending. After the success of the trilogy, she is rumored to be collaborating again with Rizky Febian on a song.

== Business ==
Apart from a career in the entertainment world, Anya Geraldine also has several businesses that she admits to work with her friends. Some of her businesses are engaged in culinary, cosmetics, and also E-cigarette fluids. She also claims to have catfish and duck farms.

== Filmography ==
=== Film ===
Year	Title	Role	Ref.
2018	Tusuk Jelangkung di Lubang Buaya	Mayang	
2019	Rembulan Tenggelam di Wajahmu	Fitri	
2019	Yowis Ben 2	Asih	
2020	Sabar Ini Ujian	Sherly	
2021	Serigala Langit	Nadya	
2021	Yowis Ben 3	Asih	
2024	Love Unlike in K-Dramas	Tara	
TBA	Garis Waktu	Sanya	

=== Web series ===
Year	Title	Role	Distributor	Ref.
2019	Lady Giga	Anya	YouTube	
2020 - 2022	Pretty Little Liars	Hanna	Viu	
2020	Julid oh Julid	Bu Karina	Maxstream	
2020	World of Dr. Boyke [id]	Suster Linda	Vidio	
2020	Gimana Nanti, Nanti Gimana	Debi	YouTube	
2021	Layangan Putus	Lydia Danira	WeTV iflix	

== Model video clips ==
- Rizky Febian - "Cuek"
- Rizky Febian - "Mantra Cinta"
- Rizky Febian - "Makna Cinta"
- Noah (band) - "Bintang Di Surga"

== Award and nomination ==
Year	Award	Kategori	Nomination work	Result	Ref.
2020	Kiss Awards 2020	Pasangan Kiyut Terkiss	Anya Geraldine dan Rizky Febian	Nominated	
2021	Insert Fashion Award 2021	Fashionable Youth	Anya Geraldine	Won	
