= Our Textbook =

- Watashitachi no Kyōkasho
- Created by: Yuji Sakamoto
- Starring: Atsushi Itoh; Miho Kanno; Mirai Shida; Shōsuke Tanihara
- Ending theme: Water Me by Bonnie Pink
- Country of origin: Japan

Production
- Running time: 45 min.

Original release
- Network: Fuji TV
- Release: April 12 – June 28, 2007

Watashitachi no Kyōkasho (わたしたちの教科書, Our Textbook) is a Japanese television drama that began airing on April 12, 2007, on Fuji TV. The series stars Miho Kanno and Atsushi Itoh. In the United States, it aired on AZN Television.

== Plot ==
Kohei Kaji is a new substitute teacher at a school where he meets a troubled girl whom he tries to help. The girl asks him if he could 'change the world'.

The very next day after a few days of lessons Kaji had with his class, the troubled girl 'fell' from her classroom window to the ground floor, engendering in her demise. Teachers tried to console students and 'lessen' the psychological harm by 'quickly getting over the whole matter'. The troubled girl left Kaji a key the night before, and Kaji went to open up the locker. He showed what was inside to the Vice Principal and the bag of items disappeared after the Vice Principal took it and said that she would 'take good care of' and 'use it properly' as evidence.

However, the textbook was nowhere to be found. The lawyer, Tsumuki, was still getting remorseful about the step daughter she had abandoned and how she had treated the now-dead girl when she was still alive. Being resolute on finding out the truth, she went through many things with Kaji during the investigation and came to an interesting ending. Mostly was done by her though. A twisted and deformed pinkie finger, a policeman soliciting high school girls, a cosplayer, a zealous teacher and, lastly, a psychopathic son are all the ingredients of this television drama.

== Main characters ==
=== Tamako Tsumiki ===
Tamako Tsumiki, is a lawyer investigating various ongoings in schools, especially those concerning the methods people will go to hide what is considered "dirty laundry". After Aizawa's accident, she attempts to visit her in the hospital but is told that Aizawa can not currently see anyone. Later on she and Kachi find a locker with Aizawa's books in them. To both of their surprise, Kaji and Tsumiki see the word "die" written all over her books, leading to think that she may have been pushed from the window and not fallen as an accident. When the two go to the school to show the books to the vice principal, they are told that Aizawa has died.

Tsumiki's boyfriend is Seri Naoyuki who is also a lawyer. He proposes to her in the first episode and she is unable to give an answer right away due to being somewhat distraught by Aizawa's death. She is 30 years old.

=== Kohei Kaji ===
Kohei Kaji is a new substitute teacher in the school, he often tries to get his students into learning and has a generally positive attitude towards them.

== Cast ==
- Tamako Tsumiki (積木 珠子, Tsumiki Tamako) - Miho Kanno (菅野 美穂, Kanno Miho)
- Kohei Kaji (加地 耕平, Kaji Kōhei) - Atsushi Itoh (伊藤 淳史, Itō Atsushi)
- Naoyuki Seri (瀬里 直之, Seri Naoyuki) - Shōsuke Tanihara (谷原 章介, Tanihara Shōsuke)
- Asuka Aizawa (藍沢 明日香, Aizawa Asuka) - Mirai Shida (志田未来, Shida Mirai)
- Saki Oshiro (大城 早紀, Ōshiro Saki) - Yoko Maki (真木 よう子, Maki Yōko)
- Nozomi Yoshikoshi (吉越 希美, Yoshikoshi Nozomi) - Wakana Sakai (酒井 若菜, Sakai Wakana)
- Atsuhiko Toita (戸板 篤彦, Toita Atsuhiko) - Okura Koji (大倉 孝二, Ōkura Kōji)
- Daisuke Yahata (八幡 大輔, Yahata Daisuke) - Hiro Mizushima (水嶋 ヒロ, Mizushima Hiro)
- Shigeichi Kumazawa (熊沢 茂市, Kumazawa Shigeichi) - Jiro Sato (佐藤 二朗, Satō Jirō)
- Otoya Amegi (雨木 音也, Amegi Otoya) - Shunji Igarashi (五十嵐 隼士, Igarashi Shunji)
- Masashi Uda (宇田 昌史, Uda Masashi) - Yasuyuki Maekawa (前川 泰之, Maekawa Yasukawa)
- Masumi Amegi (雨木 真澄, Amegi Masumi) - Jun Fubuki (風吹 ジュン, Fubuki Jun)
