= Shinzanmono =

- Genre: Crime
- Written by: Katsunari Mano; Keisuke Makino
- Directed by: Daisuke Yamamuro
- Starring: Hiroshi Abe; Meisa Kuroki; Osamu Mukai
- Ending theme: "Machi Monogatari" by Tatsuro Yamashita
- Country of origin: Japan
- Original language: Japanese
- No. of episodes: 10

Production
- Producers: Hidenori Iyoda; Yoshihiko Nakai
- Running time: 54 minutes

Original release
- Network: TBS
- Release: April 18 – June 20, 2010

Shinzanmono (新参者; "The Newcomer") is a detective Japanese television drama, part of the Spring 2010 season of the Japanese TBS Network. It is based on the same-name novel in the "Kyōichirō Kaga" series by mystery author Keigo Higashino and is set and filmed in the Ningyo-cho area of Nihonbashi, Tokyo. This series was followed by a special "Akai Yubi" aired on January 3, 2011, and a feature film The Wings of the Kirin, released on January 28, 2012.

== Synopsis ==
Shinzanmono is the name given to a newcomer. In this case, the newcomer is Kaga Kyōichirō (played by Hiroshi Abe) an experienced detective who is newly transferred to Nihonbashi Police Station in Tokyo. A woman has been murdered and he has been assigned to the team investigating the murder. As the story unfolds he finds out more about the woman, her family, and the last days of her life; hopefully leading up to the apprehension of the culprit. In the process, he uncovers the secrets of some of those who were somehow tied up in the murdered woman's life, who may, or may not have been suspects, but who were hiding truths that needed to be told.

== Cast ==
- Hiroshi Abe as Kyōichirō Kaga
- Meisa Kuroki as Ami Aoyama
- Osamu Mukai as Kōki Kiyose
- Junpei Mizobata as Shūhei Matsumiya
- Yuichi Kimura as Kazumichi Kojima
- Takashi Sasano as Yosaku Kishida
- Mieko Harada as Mineko Mitsui
- Tomokazu Miura as Naohiro Kiyose

=== Guests ===
- Yumi Asō (ep1)
- Kanji Tsuda (ep1)
- Kenji Anan (ep1)
- Teruyuki Kagawa (ep1)
- Anne/Anne Watanabe (ep1)
- Takashi Kobayashi (ep1)
- Etsuko Ichihara (ep1)
- Susumu Terajima (ep2)
- Yui Natsukawa (ep2)
- Hideo Ishiguro (ep2)
- Mao Miyaji (ep2,4,8)
- Yuko Ogura (ep3)
- Haru (ep4)
- Taichi Saotome (ep7,10)
- Mokomichi Hayami (ep9,10)
- Monta Mino (ep10)

== Production credits ==
- Original writing (novel): Shinzanmono by Higashino Keigo
- Screenwriter: Mano Katsunari (真野勝成), Makino Keisuke (牧野圭祐)
- Producers: Iyoda Hidenori (伊與田英徳), Nakai Yoshihiko (中井芳彦)
- Directors: Yamamuro Daisuke (山室大輔), Hirano Shunichi
- Music: Yugo Kanno

== See also ==
- The Wings of the Kirin
- Nemuri no Mori
- The Crimes That Bind
