= Hiroki Hasegawa =

Japanese actor (born 1977)

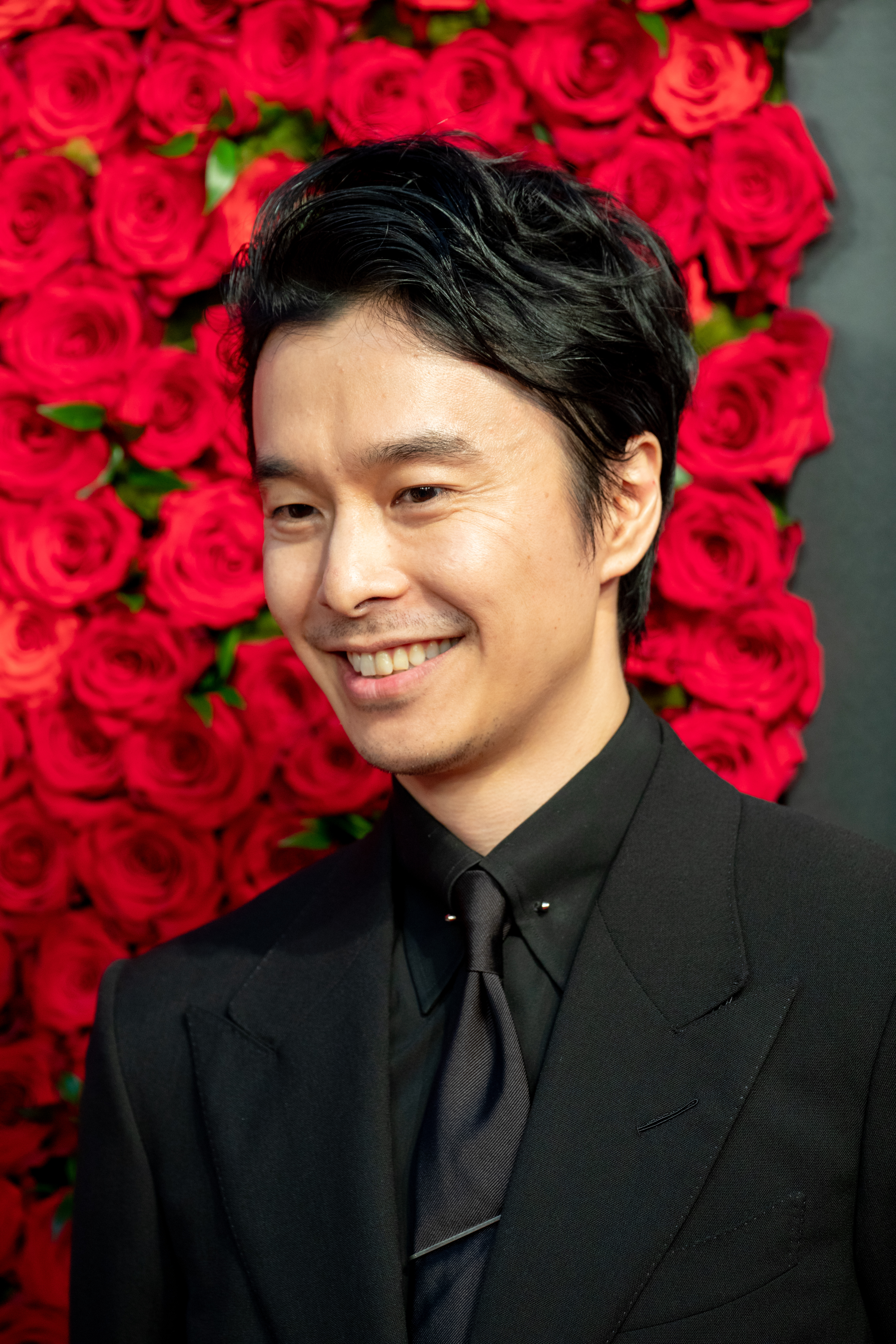
- Hasegawa attending the Tokyo International Film Festival in October 2018
- Born: March 7, 1977 (age 49); Tokyo, Japan
- Education: Chuo University
- Occupation: Actor
- Years active: 2001 - present
- Agent: Hirata Office

Hiroki Hasegawa (長谷川博己, Hasegawa Hiroki), nicknamed Hasehiro-sama (ハセヒロ様), (born March 7, 1977, in Tokyo) is a Japanese stage, film, and television actor. Trained as a stage actor at the Bungaku-za after graduating from Chuo University, he first began to appear on Japanese TV in small roles in 2008, and then in films in 2011.

== Filmography ==
=== Television ===
Year	Title	Role	Notes	Ref.
2010	Second Virgin	Kō Suzuki		
2011	I'm Mita, Your Housekeeper.	Keiichi Asuda		
2011	Suzuki Sensei	Suzuki Sensei	Lead role	
2013	Yae's Sakura	Kawasaki Shōnosuke	Taiga drama	
2013	Kumo no Kaidan	Saburō	Lead role	
2015	Dating: What's It Like to Be in Love?	Takumi Taniguchi		
2016	Soseki Natsume and his Wife	Natsume Sōseki	Miniseries	
2016	Gokumon tō	Kosuke Kindaichi	Lead role; television film	
2018–19	Manpuku	Manpei Tachibana	Asadora	
2020–21	Awaiting Kirin	Akechi Mitsuhide	Lead role; Taiga drama	
2024	Antihero	Masaki Akizumi	Lead role	

=== Film ===
Year	Title	Role	Notes	Ref.
2011	Second Virgin	Kō Suzuki		
2013	Why Don't You Play in Hell?	Hirata		
2014	Princess Jellyfish	Shū Koibuchi		
2014	Lady Maiko	Noritsugu Kyōno		
2015	Love & Peace	Ryōichi Suzuki	Lead role	
2015	Mozu	Kazuo Higashi		
2015	This Country's Sky	Ichige		
2015	Attack on Titan	Shikishima		
2016	Sailor Suit and Machine Gun: Graduation	Tsukinaga		
2016	Shin Godzilla	Rando Yaguchi	Lead role	
2016	Double Life	Shirō Ishizaka		
2017	Before We Vanish	Sakurai		
2018	Asian Three-Fold Mirror 2018: Journey	Suzuki	Lead role; Hekishu segment	
2019	Another World	Eisuke		
2019	Samurai Marathon	Itakura Katsuakira		
2022	Yes, I Can't Swim	Yūji Takanashi	Lead role	
2023	The Book of Wonders	Assistant editor		
2023	Revolver Lily	Yoshiaki Iwami		
2026	You, Like a Star	Sosuke Kitahara		

=== Video games ===
Year	Title	Role	Notes	Ref.
2024	Like a Dragon: Infinite Wealth	Masataka Ebina		

== Awards and nominations ==
Year	Award	Category	Work(s)	Result	Ref.
2012	35th Japan Academy Film Prize	Newcomer of the Year	Second Virgin	Won	
2012	36th Elan d'or Awards	Newcomer of the Year	Himself	Won	
2012	5th Tokyo Drama Awards	Best Supporting Actor	I'm Mita, Your Housekeeper	Won	
2017	40th Japan Academy Film Prize	Best Actor	Shin Godzilla	Nominated	
2020	74th Mainichi Film Awards	Best Supporting Actor	Another World	Nominated	
2021	24th Nikkan Sports Drama Grand Prix	Best Actor	Awaiting Kirin	Won	
2026	39th Nikkan Sports Film Awards	Best Supporting Actor	You, Like a Star	Pending	
