= Akihiro Kakuta =

Japanese comedian (born 1973)

- 角田 晃広
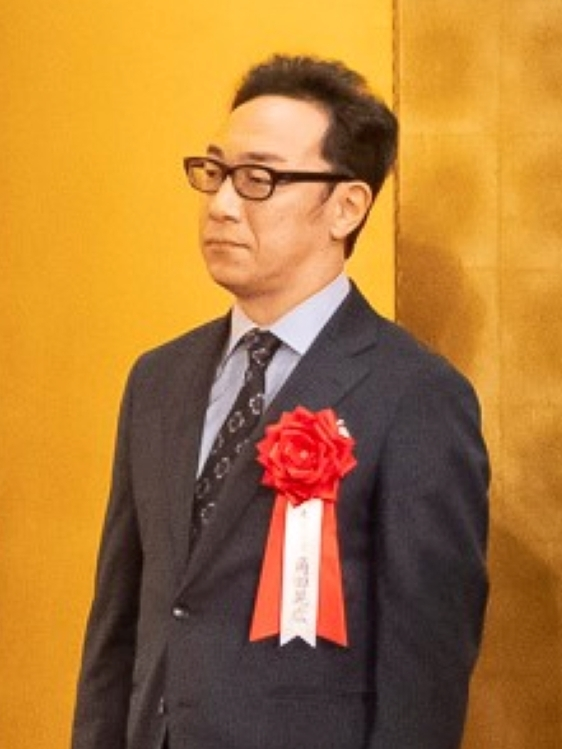
- Akihiro in 2023
- Born: December 13, 1973 (age 52); Tokyo, Japan
- Occupations: Comedian; actor
- Spouse: Unnamed (m. 2013)

Comedy career
- Years active: 1996 – present
- Genre: Owarai

Akihiro Kakuta (角田 晃広, Kakuta Akihiro; born December 13, 1973) is a Japanese comedian and actor.

== Career ==
Kakuta began his comedy career in 1996 as a member of the comedy trio Plus Driver, which disbanded in 2002. The following year, he joined the comedy duo Alpharpha, consisting of Satoshi Iizuka and Akinaga Toyomoto. The trio subsequently changed its name to Tokyo 03. Renowned for their sketch comedy, all three members have also pursued acting careers. Among them, Kakuta is a frequent cast member in works written by Bakarhythm, and won the Best Supporting Actor award at the 18th Tokyo Drama Awards for his performance in The Hot Spot (2025). He has also appeared in films directed by Hirokazu Kore-eda.

== Filmography ==
=== Television ===
Year	Title	Role	Notes	Ref.
2019	Idaten	Eiichi Morinishi	Taiga drama	
2019	You Can't Expense This!	Akihiro Yoshimura		
2021	My Dear Exes	Katoro Sato		
2023	Tengu no Daidokoro	Mugi (voice)		
2023	What Will You Do, Ieyasu?	Matsudaira Masahisa	Taiga drama	
2025	The Hot Spot	Kosuke Takahashi		
2027	Mawaru Swan	Hideki Goto	Asadora	

=== Film ===
Year	Title	Role	Notes	Ref.
2020	Step	Yoshihiko Muramatsu		
2021	Funny Bunny	Akiyoshi Akio		
2023	Monster	Fumiaki Shoda		
2026	Paris ni Saku Étoile	Enzo (voice)		
2026	Sheep in the Box	Junichi Hano		

== Awards and nominations ==
Year	Award	Category	Work(s)	Result	Ref.
2025	18th Tokyo Drama Awards	Best Supporting Actor	The Hot Spot	Won	
