= Pretty Little Liars (Indonesian TV series) =

Indonesian teen drama web series

- Genre: Crime thriller; Mystery; Drama
- Based on: Sara Shepard (books) and; I. Marlene King (original TV series)
- Developed by: I. Marlene King
- Screenplay by: Damas Cendikia; Grace Whent; Wicaksono Wisnu Legowo; Azhar Amirulhisyam
- Directed by: Emil Heradi
- Creative director: Angela Halim
- Starring: Yuki Kato; Anya Geraldine; Eyka Farhana; Valerie Thomas; Shindy Huang; Wulan Guritno; Tarra Budiman; Naufal Samudra; Jennifer Coppen; Cindy Nirmala; Giulio Parengkuan; Caitlin Halderman; Bio One; Bastian Steel
- Music by: Yovial Virgi; Abel Huray (season 2); Tabah Furqon (season 2)
- Opening theme: "Secret" by Jennifer Coppen
- Ending theme: "Secret" by Jennifer Coppen
- Country of origin: Indonesia
- Original languages: Indonesian; English
- No. of seasons: 2
- No. of episodes: 22

Production
- Executive producers: Varun Mehta; Kingsley Warner (season 1); Sahana Kamath; Angga Dwimas Sasongko (season 2); Dian Sasmita (season 2)
- Producers: Tania Hudoro; Yasmin Yaacob (season 1); Darius Sinathriya (season 1); Grace Whent (season 1); Farishad Latjuba (season 2); Tersi Eva Ranti (season 2)
- Production locations: Bali, Indonesia; Jakarta, Indonesia; Yogyakarta, Indonesia; East Java, Indonesia; Central Java, Indonesia; West Java, Indonesia
- Cinematography: Batara Goempar
- Editor: Panji Pamikat
- Running time: 42–57 minutes
- Production companies: Warner Bros. International Television Production; Cinema Collectiva (season 1); Visinema Content (season 2)

Original release
- Network: Viu
- Release: April 22, 2020 – May 18, 2022

Related
- Pretty Little Liars (2010–2017)

Pretty Little Liars is an Indonesian drama mystery streaming television series directed by Emil Heraldi for Viu. The series is adapted from the American television series of the same name by I. Marlene King, which is loosely based on a series of books by Sara Shepard. The series features an ensemble cast headed by Yuki Kato as Alissa, Anya Geraldine as Hanna, Eyka Farhana/Caitlin Halderman as Ema, Valerie Thomas as Sabrina, and Shindy Huang as Aria. The series also features Wulan Guritno, Tarra Budiman, Naufal Samudra, Jennifer Coppen, Cindy Nirmala, Giulio Parengkuan, Bio One, and Bastian Steel in starring roles. The first season was released on 22 April 2020 with 10 episodes. The second season premiered on 14 April 2022.

The series concluded on May 18, 2022, after two seasons.

== Premise ==
Set in the fictional town of Amerta, Bali, it follows the lives of four female college students whose clique falls apart when their leader, Alissa, goes mysteriously missing in the night of their high school graduation. One year later, Hanna, Ema, Sabrina and Aria find themselves reunited when they begin to receive messages from a mysterious figure known as "A", who threatens to expose their darkest secrets.

== Cast and characters ==
=== Main ===
- Yuki Kato as Alissa, the manipulative and charming queen bee of the group who mysteriously disappeared the night of her high school graduation. Based on Alison DiLaurentis.
- Anya Geraldine as Hanna, an it girl with an eating disorder. As victims of Alissa's bullying, she along with Mona then transformed into the most popular girl in campus after Alissa's disappearance. Based on Hanna Marin.
- Eyka Farhana (season 1) and Caitlin Halderman (season 2) as Ema, a shy girl coming from a religious Malaysian family. She has been in a long-term relationship with Benny, before having an interest in Mahesa. Based on Emily Fields.
- Valerie Thomas as Sabrina, an academically-bright student who grew up in a competitive family, making her sister, Melissa, her biggest rival. As the only person who isn't afraid of Alissa, she often challenges her. Based on Spencer Hastings.
- Shindy Huang as Aria, the one with the most secrets to hide. After Alissa's disappearance, her father Bondan took his whole family to live in Jakarta for a year to forget the tragedy. Upon her return, Aria started an affair with her lecturer. Based on Aria Montgomery.
- Wulan Guritno as Amira, Hanna’s loving and recently-divorced mother who is willing to do anything for her daughter. Based on Ashley Marin.
- Tarra Budiman as Eric, a new Indonesian language lecturer who’s having an affair with Aria. Based on Ezra Fitz.
- Naufal Samudra as Mahesa, a new boy who moves into Alissa's old house. He formed a friendship, and later a relationship, with Ema much to her mother's dismay due to his religion. In season two, he is sent into rehabilitation and ended his relationship with Ema. He, however, later returned and reconciled their relationship. Based on Maya St. Germain.
- Jennifer Coppen as Mona, a nerd girl who used to be tormented by Alissa. She transformed herself once the latter disappeared, taking her place as the most popular girl on campus and continues Alissa's bullying towards Raka. Based on Mona Vanderwaal.
- Cindy Nirmala as Jihan, Tama's step-sister who molested and forced him into having a relationship with her. Based on Jenna Marshall.
- Giulio Parengkuan as Tama, an older kid Alissa used to bully. He has a tattoo to celebrate his freedom from Jihan, a favor Alissa did for him. Based on Toby Cavanaugh.
- Bio One as Kevin (season 2), Hanna’s new boyfriend who is a hacker. He briefly moved in with Hanna and her mother. Based on Caleb Rivers.
- Bastian Steel as Malik (season 2), Ema's love interest. He is first introduced as being the man Asti cheated on with. Though liked by her mother, Ema is often uncomfortable with his lifestyle. In season two finale, Ema ended their relationship after finding out Asti is pregnant. Based on Paige McCullers.

=== Recurring ===
- Marcell Darwin as Reno, a doctor and Melissa’s fiancé who has feelings for Sabrina (season 1). Based on Wren Kingston.
- Evan Marvino as Benny, Ema's long-term boyfriend (season 1). Based on Ben Coogan.
- Chicco Kurniawan as Raka, a student who used to be bullied by Alissa. Based on Lucas Gottesman.
- Tegar Satrya as Darma, a corrupt detective who is investigating Alissa’s death (season 1). Based on Darren Wilden.
- Naufal Azhar (season 1) and Farandika (season 2) as Sandy, Hanna’s boyfriend who refuses to be flirty with her. Based on Sean Ackard.
- Sebastian Teti as Alex (season 1; guest season 2), Sabrina's love interest who works in a tennis club. Based on Alex Santiago.
- Cheryl Marella as Illa, Bondan's wife and mother to Aria and Miko. Based on Ella Montgomery.
- Irgi Fahrezi as Bondan, Illa's unfaithful husband who had an affair with his student. Based on Byron Montgomery.
- Anastasia Herzigova as Melissa, Sabrina's "perfect" sister and rival. Based on Melissa Hastings.
- Imelda Laish (guest season 1) and Izabel Jahja (season 2) as Vero, Sabrina's and Melissa's attorney mother. Based on Veronica Hastings.
- Richardo Benito as Peter, Vero's husband (season 1). Based on Peter Hastings.
- Nazia Mustafar (season 1) and Karina Suwandi (season 2) as Indah, Ema's religious mother who dislikes Mahesa, as she sees him as a bad influence to her daughter. Based on Pam Fields.
- Damara Finch as Novan, a handsome and popular student that Aria used to have a crush on. The Liars grow suspicious of him after Hanna witnessed him writing a message behind Eric's car. Based on Noel Kahn.
- Muhammad Ditra (season 1) and Fandy Christian (season 2) as Ian, Melissa’s husband who had a secret relationship with Alissa. Ian is killed in season two finale after someone pushed him off the cliff while attempting to kill Sabrina. Based on Ian Thomas.
- Khiva Ishak as Captain Agung (season 2), a new detective replacing Darma.
- Dito Darmawan as Gary (season 2), a police officer and acquaintance to The Liars who secretly is in a relationship with Jihan. Based on Garrett Reynolds.

=== Guest ===
- Farish Nahdi as Jason, Alissa's older brother. Based on Jason DiLaurentis.
- Pascal Azhar as Tommy (season 1), Hanna’s father who left his family for another woman. Based on Tom Marin.
- Johan Morgan as Willy (season 2). Based on Wayne Fields.
- Clafita Witoko as Sandra (season 2), Aria's former babysitter. Based on Simone.
- Intan Annur as Asti (season 2), a girl who cheated on her boyfriend with Malik. In season two finale, it's revealed she has been impregnated by Malik.
- Revaldo as James (season 2).
- Keanu Campora as Edgar (season 2).
- Stevie Domminique as Julia (season 2), Eric's former fiancée. Based on Jackie Molina

== Episodes ==
=== Series overview ===
Season	Episodes	Originally released	
Season	Episodes	First released	Last released
1	10	April 22, 2020	
2	12	April 14, 2022	May 18, 2022

=== Season 1 (2020) ===
No. overall	No. in season	Title	Directed by	Original release date
1	1	"Pretty Girls, Ugly Secrets"	Emil Heradi	April 22, 2020
In the fictional town of Amerta, Bali, a group of friends are celebrating their high school graduation. The night ends with a tragedy, when their leader, Alissa, mysteriously disappeared. A year later, Aria has just returned after living with her family in Jakarta. Aria is then reunited with Ema, who revealed the remaining friends are now estranged. Hanna has now transformed into the new it girl on their campus, while Sabrina begins to fall for her sister's fiancé. They are reunited as each one of them begin receiving messages from "A" who knows their secrets that only Alissa knew. Initially thinking it was Alissa herself, they realize someone else is playing with them when Alissa's body is found on her old house. The episode ends with The Liars attending Alissa's funeral as they all received another message.
2	2	"The Jihan Night"	Emil Heradi	April 22, 2020
The past is back to haunt the girls when Jihan returned to Amerta. A flashback revealed the girls accidentally blinded her after Alissa played a prank, in which she set a fire on Jihan's house and later blackmailed Tama to take the blame. Ema has been spending more time with Mahesa, while Aria tries to transferred out of Eric's class. Melissa's fiancé, Reno, kissed Sabrina and is seen by her.
3	3	"Relationship Status: Reckless"	Emil Heradi	April 22, 2020
The girls are planning to pay a tribute for Alissa as suggested by Ema's mother. During a lunch with her parents, Aria encounter her father's former mistress who refuses to stay away from him. Following her kiss with Reno, Sabrina faces a vengeful Melissa and disappointment from her parents. Ema's boyfriend, Benny, started being abusive and obsessive, leading to their break up. Meanwhile, Hanna's boyfriend is reluctant to be flirty with her, causing Hanna to question their relationship status after he refuses to kiss her.
4	4	"The Jungle Red"	Emil Heradi	April 22, 2020
5	5	"Forget The World"	Emil Heradi	April 22, 2020
6	6	"Girl Unplugged"	Emil Heradi	April 22, 2020
7	7	"Bad Boy, Gone Girl"	Emil Heradi	April 22, 2020
8	8	"That's Immortality"	Emil Heradi	April 22, 2020
9	9	"A Perfect Storm"	Emil Heradi	April 22, 2020
10	10	"Bye-bye Bestie"	Emil Heradi	April 22, 2020

=== Season 2 (2022) ===
No. overall	No. in season	Title	Directed by	Original release date
11	1	"The Story Continues"	Emil Heradi	April 14, 2022
12	2	"Party Girls Are The Best"	Emil Heradi	April 15, 2022
13	3	"Bad Friend, Good Enemy"	Emil Heradi	April 16, 2022
14	4	"Shut Up and Sing"	Emil Heradi	April 20, 2022
15	5	"Live In Your Shadows"	Emil Heradi	April 21, 2022
16	6	"Old Flames, New Friends"	Emil Heradi	April 27, 2022
17	7	"Crack The Code"	Emil Heradi	April 28, 2022
18	8	"Red Hot Jealousy"	Emil Heradi	May 4, 2022
19	9	"The Usual Suspects"	Emil Heradi	May 5, 2022
20	10	"Heartbreak Anniversary"	Emil Heradi	May 11, 2022
21	11	"Revelations"	Emil Heradi	May 12, 2022
22	12	"Good Girls Finish Last"	Emil Heradi	May 18, 2022

== Production ==
=== Development ===
The series was announced on August 27, 2019 along with the ensemble cast. The series is produced by Asian streaming service, Viu, in collaboration with Warner Bros International Television Production.

In August 2020, the second season is confirmed to be on development. Anya Geraldine later that year stated the production for the second season will most likely begin in June 2021.

=== Casting ===
Along with the series' announcement, it wasannounced that Anya Geraldine, Eyka Farhana, Valerie Thomas, and Shindy Huang are set to play the main characters Hanna, Ema, Sabrina, and Aria. Yuki Kato also joined in her role as Alissa, the famous it girl and queen bee of the group.

Eyka Farhana who was initially scheduled to return for season two decided to leave due to COVID-19. Caitlin Halderman joined to replace Eyka in the role of Ema. In addition, Bio One and Bastian Steel joined the main cast in their respective roles as Kevin and Malik for season two; Khiva Ishak joined in a guest role as a detective. Another addition in the cast are Fandy Christian, Farandika, Izabel Jahja, and Karina Suwandi replacing the previous cast members as Ian, Sandy, Vero, and Indah.

=== Filming ===
The first season was filmed in Bali, Indonesia in 40 days from June to August 2019.

=== Writing ===
Due to the series being produced in Indonesia, Ema's character, which is based on Emily Fields, is rewritten. As a result, the characters based on Maya St. Germain and Paige McCullers are gender-swapped, which also resulted in Ema's character having a completely different storyline.

=== Music ===
Yovial Virgi produced the series' score and its theme song, "Secret" by cast member Jennifer Coppen. The song is used for both the opening sequence and end credit, with the former using a remix version.

== Release ==
The first season consisted of 10 episodes and were released on April 22, 2020. The second season premiered on April 14, 2022 and concluded on May 18, 2022.
