= The Tiger and Her Wings =

- Genre: Drama
- Written by: Erika Yoshida
- Directed by: Yoshirō Nagikawa; Daisuke Andō; Mayo Hashimoto
- Starring: Sairi Ito; Masaki Okada; Yuriko Ishida; Takashi Okabe; Taiga Nakano; Misato Morita; Shūsaku Kamikawa; Shiori Doi; Yuki Sakurai; Kami Hiraiwa; Ha Yeon-soo; Junki Tozuka; Takanori Iwata; Rin Kataoka; Ikki Sawamura; Kenichi Takitō; Kenichi Matsuyama; Kaoru Kobayashi
- Narrated by: Machiko Ono
- Opening theme: "Sayonara, Mata Itsuka!" by Kenshi Yonezu
- Composer: Yūta Mori
- Country of origin: Japan
- Original language: Japanese
- No. of episodes: 130

Production
- Producers: Kaoru Ishizawa; Tetsuo Funahashi; Shōko Tokuda
- Running time: 15 minutes
- Production company: NHK

Original release
- Network: NHK
- Release: April 1 – September 27, 2024

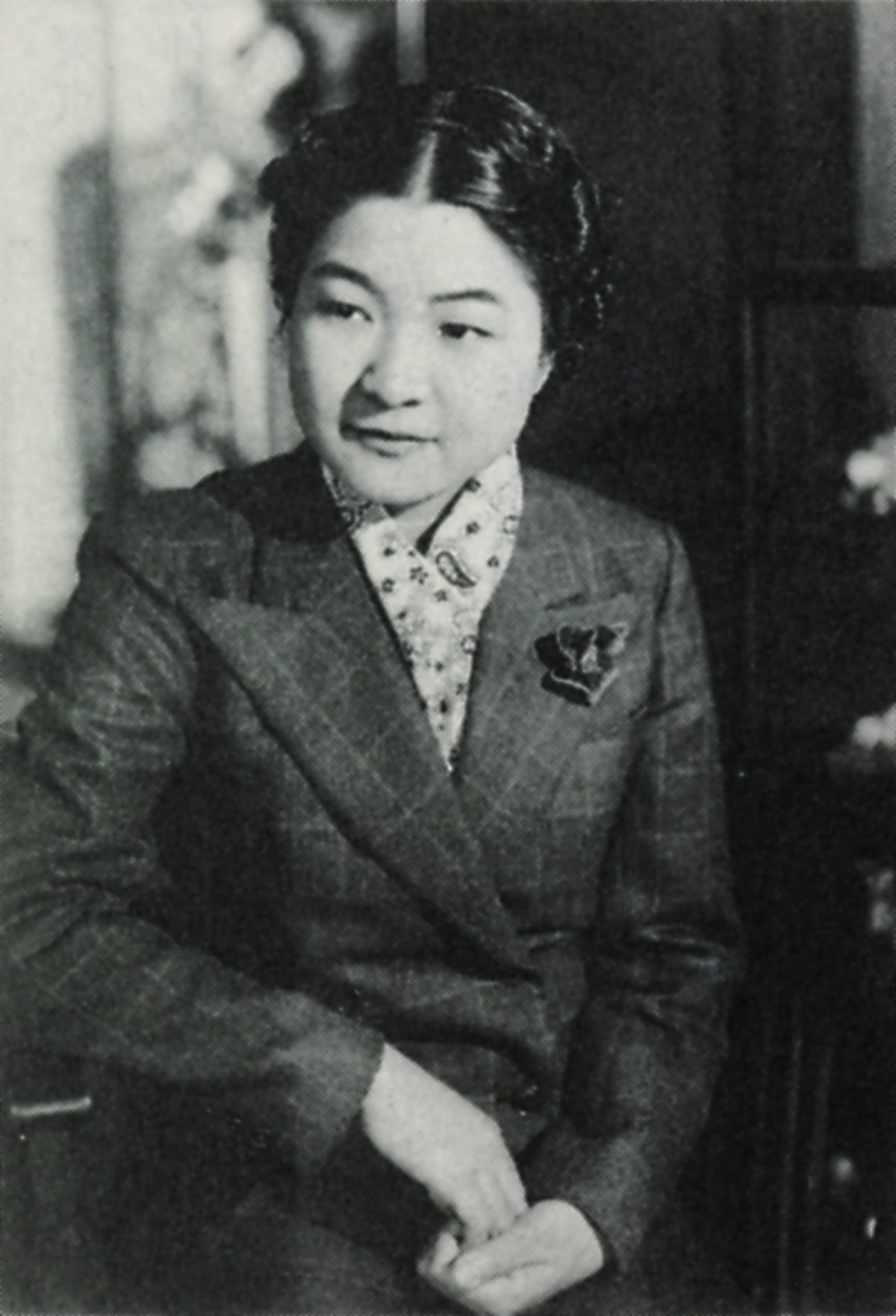
Japanese lawyer and judge, Yoshiko Mutō (Later Mibuchi)

The Tiger and Her Wings (虎に翼, Tora ni Tsubasa) is a Japanese television drama series and the 110th Asadora series, following Boogie Woogie. The drama is modeled after one of Japan's first female lawyers, Yoshiko Mibuchi, but it is produced as fiction and is an original drama work.

== Plot ==
The story begins in the 1930s. Tomoko Inotsume is striving to become an unprecedented female lawyer in Japan by dedicating herself to her studies. However, she faces the obstacles of Japan's laws and society, which often disregard women.

== Cast ==
=== Inotsume's family ===
- Sairi Ito as Tomoko Inotsume
- Yuriko Ishida as Haru Inotsume, Tomoko's mother
- Takashi Okabe as Naokoto Inotsume, Tomoko's father
- Shūsaku Kamikawa as Naomichi Inotsume, Tomoko's older brother
- Ryoki Miyama (Be First) as Naoaki Inotsume, Tomoko's younger brother
- Misato Morita as Hanae Inotsume (née Yonetani), Naomichi's wife
- Taiga Nakano as Yūzō Sada, Tomoko's husband
- Asuka Kawatoko as Yumi Sada, Tomoko and Yūzō's daughter
  - Nono Maida as young Yumi

=== Meiritsu University ===
- Shiori Doi as Yone Yamada
  - Ikoi Hayase as young Yone
- Yuki Sakurai as Ryōko Sakuragawa
- Kami Hiraiwa as Umeko Ōba
- Kyoya Honda as Kosaburo Ōba, Umeko's third son
- Ha Yeon-soo as Choi Hyang-suk (Sai Kou-shuku) → Kyoko Shiomi
- Ryoko Kobayashi as Satoko Kubota
- Wako Ando as Chiharu Nakayama
- Junki Tozuka as Taichi Todoroki
- Takanori Iwata as Satoru Hanaoka

=== Yonetani's family ===
- Mariko Akama as Nobuko Yonetani, Hanae's mother
- Etsuo Yokobori as Shin'ichi Yonetani, Hanae's father
- Mayumi Tanaka as Ine

=== Sakuragawa's family ===
- Mariko Tsutsui as Hisako Sakuragawa, Ryōko's mother
- Ikuji Nakamura as Yūjirō Sakuragawa, Ryōko's father
- Nagi Hasegawa as Tama

=== Kōichi's family ===
- Masaki Okada as Kōichi Hoshi, Tomoko's second husband
- Mitsuru Hirata as Tomohiko Hoshi, Kōichi's father. He is modeled after Tadahiko Mibuchi.
- Kimiko Yo as Yuri Hoshi
- Yuki Inoue as Tomokazu Hoshi
- Ichika Osaki as Nodoka Hoshi

=== Others ===
- Kaoru Kobayashi as Shigechika Hodaka. He is modeled after Shigetō Hozumi, a grandson of Eiichi Shibusawa. (Note: Kobayashi once played the role of Eiichi's father in a Taiga drama series.)
- Kenichi Matsuyama as Tōichirō Katsuraba
- Kinari Hirano as Kei Shiomi, Kyoko's husband
- Ikki Sawamura as Yoriyasu Kudō
- Kenichi Takitō as Kōshirō Takigawa
- Yōji Tanaka as Sasayama
- Tsutomu Takahashi as Jirō Takenaka
- Muga Tsukaji as Rokurō Unno
- Hideo Kurihara as Tanaka, a chief judge
- Hiroaki Hirata as Takei, a chief judge
- Jirō (Sissonne) as a lawyer
- Shinobu Hasegawa (Sissonne) as a lawyer
- Yūsuke Hirayama as Masuno
- Kohji Moritsugu as Mizunuma
- Bin Furuya as Takekichi Wakashima
- Tsutomu Isobe as Rikitaro Nishikida, a lawyer
- Keisuke Horibe as Hiwada, a prosecutor
- Machiko Washio as Tsune Ōba
- Katsumi Takahashi as Tarō Sugita
- Kenichi Ogata as Shigeta
- Katsumi Kiba as Morihiko Jinbo
- Naruki Matsukawa as Yūji Inagaki
- Blake Crawford as Albert Horner
- Rinko Kikuchi as Ritsuko Ibarada, a singer
- Karen Miyama as Hitomi Fukuda
- Ayumu Mochizuki as Yūzaburō Takase
- Miou Tanaka as Tadayoshi Ichiyanagi
- Soma Santoki as Toshio Motoki
- Yūta Hayashi as Hajime Mizukami
- Rin Kataoka as Misae Moriguchi and her daughter Miyuki
- Masato Wada as Tokio Endō
- Miho Watanabe as Mariko Akiyama
- Akana Ikeda as Kaoru Shiomi, Kei and Kyoko's daughter

== Music ==
On April 1, 2024, it was announced that "Sayonara, Mata Itsuka!" by Kenshi Yonezu would be released on April 8 as the theme song for the series. Stuart Murdoch, who leads Belle and Sebastian, sang the insert song “You are so amazing” in the drama.

== TV schedule ==
Week	Episodes	Title	Directed by	Original airdate	Rating
1	1–5	"Onnasakashite Ushi Urisokonau?" (女賢しくて牛売り損なう?)	Yoshirō Nagikawa	April 1–5, 2024	16.2%
2	6–10	"Onna Sannin Yoreba Kashimashii?" (女三人寄ればかしましい?)	Yoshirō Nagikawa	April 8–12, 2024	16.4%
3	11–15	"Onna wa Sangai ni Ie Nashi?" (女は三界に家なし?)	Mayo Hashimoto	April 15–19, 2024	16.5%
4	16–20	"Kagami-onna ni Sori-otoko?" (屈み女に反り男?)	Yoshirō Nagikawa	April 22–26, 2024	16.3%
5	21–25	"Asaame wa Onna no Udemakuri?" (朝雨は女の腕まくり?)	Daisuke Andō	April 29–May 3, 2024	15.8%
6	26–30	"Onna no Ichinen, Iwa omo Tōsu?" (女の一念、岩をも通す?)	Daisuke Andō	May 6–10, 2024	16.5%
7	31–35	"Onna no Kokoro wa Neko no Me?" (女の心は猫の目?)	Yoshirō Nagikawa	May 13–17, 2024	17.6%
8	36–40	"Onna-myōri ni Tsukiru?" (女冥利に尽きる?)	Mayo Hashimoto	May 20–24, 2024	16.5%
9	41–45	"Otoko wa Dokyō, Onna wa Aikyō?" (男は度胸、女は愛嬌?)	Daisuke Andō	May 27–31, 2024	17.0%
10	46–50	"Onna no Chie wa Hana no Saki?" (女の知恵は鼻の先?)	Yoshirō Nagikawa	June 3–7, 2024	16.7%
11	51–55	"Joshi to Shōjin wa Yashinaigatashi?" (女子と小人は養い難し?)	Yoshirō Nagikawa	June 10–14, 2024	17.3%
12	56–60	"Ie ni Nyōbō naki wa Hi no nai Ro no gotoshi?" (家に女房なきは火のない炉のごとし?)	Daisuke Andō	June 17–21, 2024	17.2%
13	61–65	"Nyōbō wa Hakidame kara Hiroe?" (女房は掃きだめから拾え?)	Mayo Hashimoto	June 24–28, 2024	17.2%
14	66–70	"Nyōbō Hyakunichi Uma Hatsuka?" (女房百日 馬二十日?)	Yoshirō Nagikawa	July 1–5, 2024	17.3%
15	71–75	"Nyōbō wa Yama no Kami Hyakkoku no Kurai?" (女房は山の神百石の位?)	Haruka Ijūin	July 8–12, 2024	17.1%
16	76–80	"Onna Yamome ni Hana ga Saku?" (女やもめに花が咲く?)	Yoshirō Nagikawa	July 15–19, 2024	17.2%
17	81–85	"Onna no Nasake ni Hebi ga Sumu?" (女の情に蛇が住む?)	Kazuki Aizawa	July 22–26, 2024	17.3%
18	86–90	"Shichinin no Ko wa nasutomo Onna ni Kokoro Yurusuna?" (七人の子は生すとも女に心許すな?)	Mayo Hashimoto	July 29–August 2, 2024	16.7%
19	91–95	"Akujo no Kenja buri?" (悪女の賢者ぶり?)	Yoshirō Nagikawa	August 5–9, 2024	15.9%
20	96–100	"Kasegi-otoko ni Kuri-onna?" (稼ぎ男に繰り女?)	Yoshirō Nagikawa	August 12–16, 2024	17.0%
21	101–105	"Teijo wa Jifu ni Mamiezu?" (貞女は二夫に見えず?)	Yū Sakai	August 19–23, 2024	17.1%
22	106–110	"Nyōbō ni Horete Oie Hanjō?" (女房に惚れてお家繁盛?)	Mayo Hashimoto	August 26–30, 2024	17.6%
23	111–115	"Hajime wa Shojo no Gotoku, Nochi wa Datto no Gotoshi?" (始めは処女の如く、後は脱兎の如し?)	Yoshirō Nagikawa	September 2–6, 2024	17.2%
24	116–120	"Onna Sannin areba Shindai ga Tsubureru?" (女三人あれば身代が潰れる?)	Yoshirō Nagikawa	September 9–13, 2024	17.1%
25	121–125	"Onna no Chie wa Ato e Mawaru?" (女の知恵は後へまわる?)	Mayo Hashimoto	September 16–20, 2024	16.3%
26	126–130	"Tora ni Tsubasa" (虎に翼)	Yoshirō Nagikawa	September 23–27, 2024	17.1%
Average rating 16.8% - Rating is based on Japanese Video Research (Kantō region).

== Notes ==
Preceded by Boogie Woogie	Asadora; April 1 – September 27, 2024	Succeeded by Omusubi
