= Kami Hiraiwa =

Japanese actress (born 1979)

- 平岩 紙
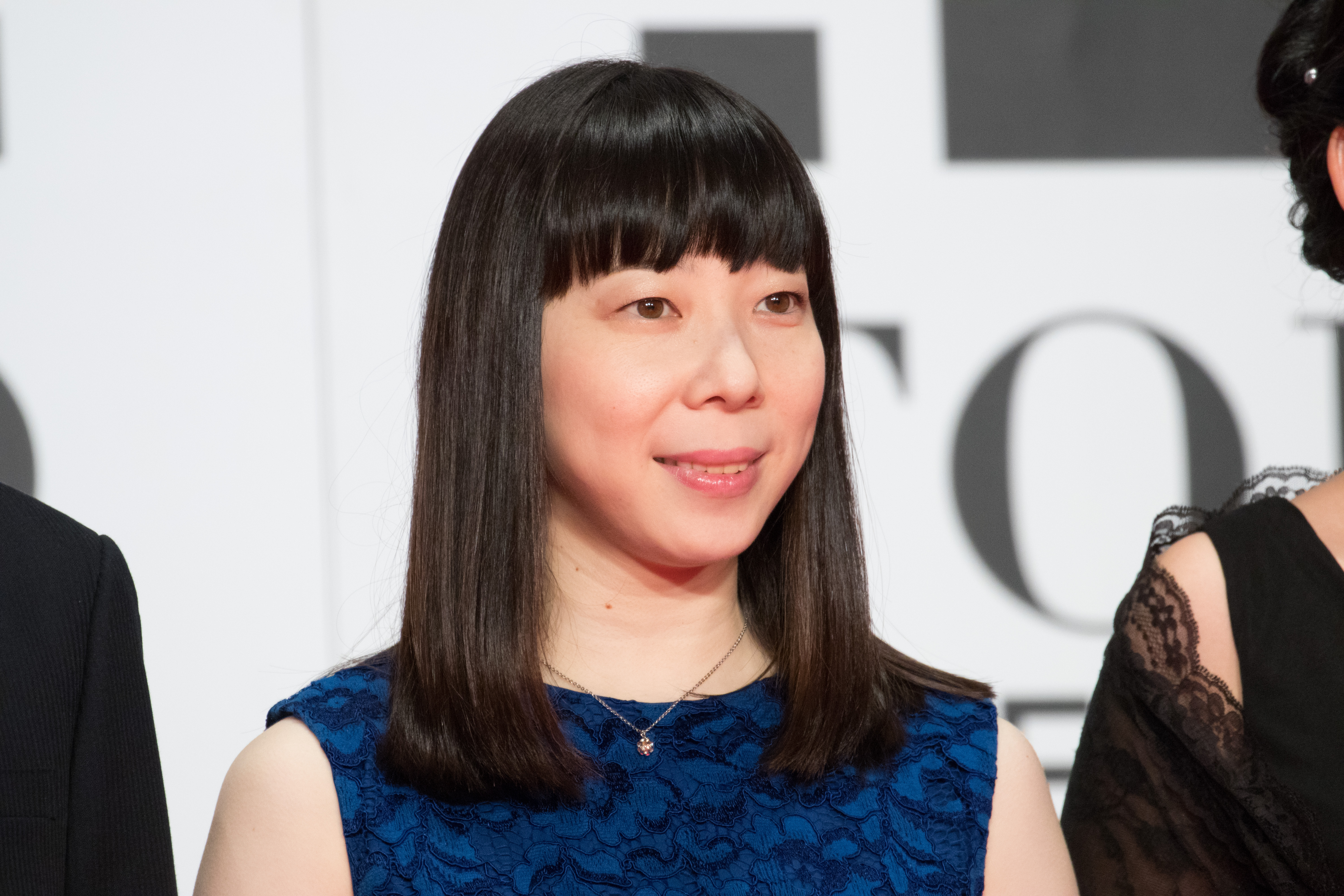
- Born: Kana Hiraiwa; November 3, 1979 (age 46); Suita, Osaka, Japan
- Occupation: Actress
- Years active: 2000–present
- Agent: Otona Keikaku
- Spouse: Sōichirō Yamauchi (m. 2020)
- Children: 1

Kami Hiraiwa (平岩 紙, Hiraiwa Kami; born November 3, 1979, in Suita, Osaka, Japan) is a Japanese actress. Her birth name was Kana Hiraiwa (平岩 加奈, Hiraiwa Kana). She is represented by Otona Keikaku.

== Personal life ==
Hiraiwa married musician Sōichirō Yamauchi, a member of the rock band, Fujifabric on January 1, 2020. The pair first met while co-starring in a musical-comedy television series in 2016 and began a relationship shortly afterward. On June 3, 2023, it was reported that she had given birth to her first child. The specific date of birth and gender of the baby was not disclosed.

== Filmography ==
=== TV drama ===
Year	Title	Role	Notes	Ref.
2002	Kisarazu Cat's Eye	Miiko		
2016	Daddy Sister	Teruyo Morita	Asadora	
2021	Isoroku Yamamoto in London	Reiko Yamamoto	Television film	
2022	Umeko: The Face of Female Education	Utako Shimoda	Television film	
2022	The Sunflower Disappeared in the Rain	Mayumi Nara	Miniseries	
2023	Ōoku: The Inner Chambers	Kangyō-in		
2024	The Tiger and Her Wings	Umeko Ōba	Asadora	
2025	The Hot Spot	Minami Hibino		

=== Films ===
Year	Title	Role	Notes	Ref.
2022	Tsuyukusa			
2023	Ripples	Setsuko Itō		
2024	The Three Young-Men in Midnight: The Movie 2	Hibari		
2027	The Tiger and Her Wings: The Movie	Umeko Takehara		
2027	In My Father's Room	Marie Yakumaru		

=== Japanese dub ===
Title	Role	Notes	Ref.
Mary and Max	Mary		
