= Omameda Towako and Her Three Ex-Husbands =

Japanese TV drama

- Also known as: My Dear Exes
- Genre: Comedy drama Romantic comedy
- Written by: Yuji Sakamoto
- Directed by: Nakae Kazuhito; Ikeda Chihiro; Taki Yusuke
- Starring: Takako Matsu; Ryuhei Matsuda; Akihiro Kakuta; Masaki Okada
- Ending theme: 《Presence》- STUTS & Takako Matsu with 3exes
- Composer: Yuta Bandoh
- Country of origin: Japan
- Original language: Japanese
- No. of episodes: 10

Production
- Producer: Ayumi Sano

Original release
- Network: Fuji TV; KTV
- Release: April 13 – June 15, 2021

Omameda Towako and Her Three Ex-Husbands (大豆田とわ子と三人の元夫, Omameda Towako to Sannin no Motootto), or Towako Omameda and Her Three Ex-Husbands, also known by the abbreviation Mameo (まめ夫), is a Japanese television drama series. The official English title is My Dear Exes. It stars Takako Matsu as the titular character, a 40-year-old woman who, after three marriages that ended in divorce, is raising her teenage daughter while becoming the head of a construction company. Her attempts to succeed and live a fulfilled life only bring her closer to the antics of her ex-husbands (Ryuhei Matsuda, Akihiro Kakuta, Masaki Okada).

Scripted by Yuji Sakamoto, who previously worked with Matsu and Matsuda on the drama Quartet, Omameda Towako was conceived as a "new kind of romantic comedy" and "chatty drama," where attention would be placed on the fast-flowing dialogue between actors. Upon release, the show received acclaim for its story and performances. Although it received a low average viewership rating of 6.1% upon its initial airing on KTV, a subsequent release on Netflix in Japan gave it a larger audience and success on social media.

== Cast ==
Promotional poster

- Takako Matsu as Towako Omameda
- Ryuhei Matsuda as Hassaku Tanaka (Husband 1)
- Akihiro Kakuta as Katoro Sato (Husband 2)
- Masaki Okada as Shinshin Nakamura (Husband 3)
- Hana Toyoshima as Uta Omameda
- Ryo Iwamatsu as Ousuke Omameda
- Mikako Ichikawa as Kagome Watarai
- Shizuka Ishibashi as Sara Mitsuya
- Kumi Takiuchi as Mirei Furuki
- Natsumi Ichibashi as Tsubasa Kotani
- Maryjun Takahashi as Karen Shorin
- Yoshimasa Kondo as Jin Rokubo
- Joe Odagiri as Hiroshi Takanashi
