= Junpei Mizobata =

Japanese actor (born 1989)

- 溝端 淳平
- Born: June 14, 1989 (age 37); Hashimoto, Wakayama, Japan
- Occupations: Actor, endorser
- Years active: 2007–present
- Agent: Ever Green Entertainment
- Spouse: Undisclosed (m. 2025)
- Website: Official Website

Junpei Mizobata (Japanese: 溝端 淳平, Hepburn: Mizobata Junpei; June 14, 1989) is a Japanese actor, best known as Kudo Shinichi in Detective Conan: Kudo Shinichi e no Chousenjou and Saga Kazuma in Hanazakari no Kimitachi e. He also appears in the drama Akai Ito as Atsushi Nishino (or Akkun).

== Personal life ==
Junpei Mizobata was born on June 14, 1989, in Hashimoto, Wakayama, Japan, to a family of four, including parents and sister. He likes to play drum and soccer in his leisure time. He loves Natto and Salmon.

In 2014, rumors have surfaced that Junpei and actress Nana Katase are in a relationship. While Mizobata neither admitted or denied the rumors, he apologized, "I'm sorry to have caused people trouble with reports about my personal life at this time."

Yahoo! News reported that Nana and Junpei have revealed they are a couple and are allegedly “considering marriage”.

On January 1, 2025, Mizobata announced his marriage to a general woman, whom he had been dating for a long time.

== Filmography ==
=== Film ===
| Year | Title | Role | Notes | Ref. |
|---|---|---|---|---|
| 2008 | Dive!! | Naoto Kumazawa | Lead role | |
| 2008 | Threads of Destiny | Nishino Atsushi | Lead role | |
| 2009 | Halfway | Tasuku Tashiro | | |
| 2010 | Neck | Tomokazu Shudo | | |
| 2010 | You Dance with the Summer | Teramoto Shinpei | Lead role | |
| 2011 | High School Debut | Komiyama Yoh | Lead role | |
| 2012 | The Wings of the Kirin | Shūhei Matsumiya | | |
| 2012 | Fly with the Gold | Haruki | | |
| 2017 | Hurricane Polymar | Polymar | Lead role | |
| 2018 | The Crimes That Bind | Shūhei Matsumiya | | |
| 2018 | Itosato: A Kyoto Coutesan at the End of Samurai Era | Hijikata Toshizō | | |
| 2019 | Whistleblower | Hoshino | Cameo | |
| 2025 | 366 Days | Ryota | | |

=== Television ===
| Year | Title | Role | Notes | Ref. |
|---|---|---|---|---|
| 2007 | Hana-Kimi | Saga Kazuma | | |
| 2008 | Hachi-One Diver | Sugata Kentaro | Lead role | |
| 2008 | Fukidemono to Imouto | Hashiguchi Tomoya | | |
| 2008 | Akai Ito | Nishino Atsushi | Lead role | |
| 2009 | Buzzer Beat | Hatano Shuji | | |
| 2009–11 | Boss | Hanagata Ippei | 2 seasons | |
| 2010 | Shinzanmono | Shūhei Matsumiya | | |
| 2011 | Detective Conan: The Mystery of the Legendary Monster Bird | Shinichi Kudo | Lead role; TV movie | |
| 2011 | Mitsu no Aji ～A Taste of Honey～ | Yasushi Norisugi | | |
| 2012 | Detective Conan: Kyoto Shinsengumi Murder Case | Shinichi Kudo | Lead role; TV movie | |
| 2012 | Tsurukame Maternity Center | Onodera Tatsuya | | |
| 2012–13 | I Love Tokyo Legend - Kawaii Detective | Katsuura Hiroto | 2 seasons | |
| 2013 | Sodom no Ringo | Kengo Kitano | | |
| 2013 | Eve in Love | Gakkun | Lead role; TV movie | |
| 2013 | No Dropping Out: Back to School at 35 | Koizumi Junichi | | |
| 2014 | Heartbroken Chocolatier | Olivier Tréluyer | | |
| 2014 | Last Night's Curry, Tomorrow's Bread | Iwai Masaharu | | |
| 2014 | Girls in the Bar | Taisuke Takiguchi | | |
| 2019 | Scarlet | Keisuke Sakata | Asadora | |
| 2021 | Komi Can't Communicate | Makoto Katai | | |
| 2023 | What Will You Do, Ieyasu? | Imagawa Ujizane | Taiga drama | |

=== Japanese dub ===
| Year | Title | Role | Voice dub for | Notes | Ref. |
|---|---|---|---|---|---|
| 2011 | The Three Musketeers | D'Artagnan | Logan Lerman | | |
| 2014 | Captain America: The Winter Soldier | Sam Wilson / Falcon | Anthony Mackie | | |
| 2015 | Avengers: Age of Ultron | Sam Wilson / Falcon | Anthony Mackie | | |
| 2015 | Ant-Man | Sam Wilson / Falcon | Anthony Mackie | | |
| 2016 | Captain America: Civil War | Sam Wilson / Falcon | Anthony Mackie | | |
| 2018 | Avengers: Infinity War | Sam Wilson / Falcon | Anthony Mackie | | |
| 2019 | Avengers: Endgame | Sam Wilson / Falcon | Anthony Mackie | | |
| 2025 | Captain America: Brave New World | Sam Wilson / Captain America | Anthony Mackie | | |
| 2026 | Avengers: Doomsday | Sam Wilson / Captain America | Anthony Mackie | | |

== Accolades ==
| Year | Award | Category | Notable Works | Result | Ref. |
|---|---|---|---|---|---|
| 2006 | 19th Junon Super Boy Contest | Grand Prix | Himself | Won | |
| 2009 | 2nd Tokyo Drama Awards | Newcomer Award | Akai Ito | Won | |
| 2010 | 33rd Japan Academy Film Prize | Rookie of the Year | Threads of Destiny | Won | |
