= Ryuhei Matsuda =

Japanese actor (born 1983)

- 松田 龍平
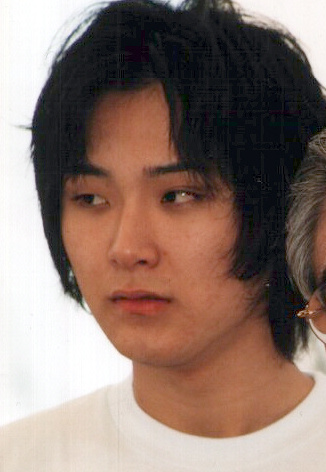
- Ryuhei at Cannes Film Festival in 2000
- Born: 9 May 1983 (age 43); Suginami, Tokyo, Japan
- Occupation: Actor
- Years active: 1999–present
- Spouses: Rina Ōta (m. 2009; div. 2017); Mala Morgan (m. 2021)
- Children: 2
- Parent(s): Yūsaku Matsuda (father); Miyuki Matsuda (mother)
- Relatives: Shota Matsuda (brother); Yuuki Matsuda (sister); Kozue Akimoto (sister-in-law)
- Website: www.office-saku.com

Ryuhei Matsuda (松田 龍平, Matsuda Ryūhei; born May 9, 1983) is a Japanese film and television actor. Matsuda's best known film roles include the young and desirable samurai Sōzaburō Kanō in Taboo and the rock star Ren Honjo in Nana.

== Early life ==
Matsuda was born on May 9, 1983 in Tokyo, to Yūsaku Matsuda, a Japanese actor of partial Korean ancestry, and Miyuki Matsuda (née Kumagai), a Japanese actress. He has two younger siblings, a younger brother, Shota Matsuda, who is also an actor, and a younger sister, Yuuki Matsuda, who is a singer, and one older half-sister by his father's first marriage. His father died from bladder cancer in 1989, when Ryuhei was six years old. He attended Horikoshi High School, a Japanese high school that caters to celebrity students, but did not graduate.

== Career ==
At age 15, Matsuda was offered the role of the desirable young samurai Kanō Sōzaburō in Nagisa Ōshima's 1999 film Taboo. The role helped boost him from an entirely unknown actor to a film star, earning him a Japanese Academy award "Newcomer of the Year", as well as "Blue Ribbon", "Kinema Junpo", and "Yokohama Film Festival" Awards for the "Best New Actor".

Since appearing in Taboo, Matsuda has played a wide range of roles, from the high school student Kujo in the 2001 film Blue Spring to the rock star Ren Honjo in the 2005 film Nana. In February 2013, it was revealed that Matsuda would play the part of a Japanese gangster in the sequel to the 2012 Indonesian film The Raid, named Berandal.

In 2020 portrayed Ryūnosuke Akutagawa in the film A Stranger in Shanghai. It depicts Akutagawa's time in as a reporter in the city.

== Personal life ==
Matsuda is married to Mala Morgan, a British-Japanese model with whom he has a fourteen-year age gap. The two wed on October 20, 2021 after dating for three years and have one son together, born March 12, 2022.

Matsuda was previously married to Russian-Japanese actress and model Rina Ōta. They have one child together, a daughter, born July 4, 2009. They wed on January 11, 2009 and divorced in December 2017.

== Filmography ==
=== Films ===
- Taboo (1999)
- Shibito no Koiwazurai (2001)
- Hashire! Ichiro (2001)
- Blue Spring (2002)
- Collage of Our Life (2003)
- 17 Sai (2003)
- 9 Souls as Michiru (2003)
- Hachigatsu no Kariyushi (2003)
- Showa Kayo Daizenshu (2003)
- Cutie Honey (2004)
- Izo (2004)
- Otakus in Love (2004)
- Yasha no Ike (2004)
- Nana (2005)
- Gimmy Heaven (2005)
- Rampo Noir (2005)
- Demon Pond (2005)
- Big Bang Love, Juvenile A (2006)
- Nightmare Detective (2006)
- Chosyu Five (2006)
- Sekai ha Tokidoki Utsukushii (2007)
- Purukogi (2007)
- Koisuru Madori (2007)
- Ahiru to Kamo no Koinrokkâ (2007)
- Densen Uta (2007)
- Nobody to Watch Over Me (2008)
- Nightmare Detective 2 (2008)
- Mt. Tsurugidake (2009)
- The Cannery Ship (Kanikosen) (2009)
- Hagetaka: The Movie (The Vulture) (2009)
- Boys on the Run (2010)
- Phone Call to the Bar (2011), Takada
- Tada's Do-It-All House (2011)
- The Great Passage (2013)
- Mugiko-san to (2013)
- Detective in the Bar (2013), Takada
- The Raid 2 (2014)
- Jinuyo Saraba: Kamuroba Mura e (2015)
- The Magnificent Nine (2016)
- My Uncle (2016)
- The Tokyo Night Sky Is Always the Densest Shade of Blue (2017)
- Before We Vanish (2017)
- The Last Shot in the Bar (2017), Takada
- The Scythian Lamb (2018)
- Isle of Dogs (2018) (German-American film)
- The Miracle of Crybaby Shottan (2018), Shōji Segawa
- Noroshi ga Yobu (2019)
- Beneath the Shadow (2020)
- Hakai no Hi (2020)
- Zokki (2021)
- Who Were We? (2024)
- Transcending Dimensions (2025)
- Unreachable (2025), Yuki Tsunaga (voice)
- Sai: Disaster (2026), Shin'ichiro Kuramoto
- Bye Bye Love: Detective Is in the Bar (2026), Takada
- The Secret Battlefield (2026), Hirohito
- Undergirl (2026), Underman
- Hara o Kukutte (2027)
- The Real Killer (2027)

=== TV dramas ===
- San Oku-Yen Jiken (2000), Roku
- Hagetaka (2007), Osamu Nishino
- Ashita no Kita Yoshio (2008), Heita Yashiro
- Tenchijin (2009), Date Masamune
- Mahoro Ekimae Bangaichi (2013), Haruhiko Gyōten
- Amachan (2013), Takuma Mizuguchi
- Quartet (2017), Tsukasa Beppu
- Kurara: The Dazzling Life of Hokusai's Daughter (2017), Zenjirō
- Kemono ni Narenai Watashitachi (2018), Kosei Nemoto
- Smoking (2018), Masayuki Sakakibara
- Yuganda Hamon (2019), Masahiko Sawamura
- Idaten (2019), Kenzō Tange
- A Stranger in Shanghai (2019), Ryūnosuke Akutagawa
- Okehazama (2021), Shibata Katsuie
- My Dear Exes (2021), Hassaku Tanaka
- Uzukawamura Jiken (2022), Iwamori
- Tokyo Salad Bowl (2025), Ryo Arikino
- Asura (2025), Katsumata
- Simulation: Defeat in the Summer of 1941 (2025), Hirohito
- Sai: Disaster (2025), Shin'ichiro Kuramoto

== Awards ==
Matsuda won a Japanese Academy Award for the "Best Supporting Actor" in the 2011 film Tantei wa Bar ni Iru, and Nikkan Sports Film Award for the "Best Actor" in the 2013 film The Great Passage.
