= The Hot Spot (TV series) =

2025 Japanese television drama series

- Hotto Supotto (ホットスポット)
- Genre: Comedy
- Written by: Bakarhythm
- Directed by: Itaru Mizuno; Nobuyoshi Yamada; Kento Matsuda
- Starring: Mikako Ichikawa; Akihiro Kakuta; Anne Suzuki; Kami Hiraiwa; Kaho; Fumiyo Kohinata
- Music by: Fox Capture Plan
- Country of origin: Japan
- Original language: Japanese
- No. of episodes: 10

Production
- Executive producer: Tadahisa Dosaka
- Producers: Reina Oda; Yusuke Odai; Kenta Noda
- Running time: 55 minutes
- Production company: NTV

Original release
- Network: NNS
- Release: January 12 – March 16, 2025

The Hot Spot (hepburn ホットスポット) is a Japanese fantasy comedy drama starring Mikako Ichikawa. It was first broadcast on January 12, 2025, on Nippon TV and is available online on netflix. Comedian Bakarhythm wrote the scenario with music composed by Fox Capture Plan.

== Plot ==
Kiyomi Endo (Mikako Ichikawa) is a single mother working at a Hotel reception in a small town at the foot of Mt. Fuji in Yamanashi Prefecture. After returning from work one day going home on a bicycle, she was saved by her by her senior workmate, Kosuke Takahashi fellow working, a split second before she was going to be run over by a truck. His actions seemed humanly impossible, as he not only saved her, but is standing next to her with her bicycle in the air.

Kiyomi interrogates Takahashi, and as the events are otherwise unexplainable, Takahashi confesses that he is an alien with special powers. Kiyomi promises that she will not say anything else, but she soon breaks her promise, telling her local childhood friends, Hazuki Nakamura and Minami Hibino.As he has special powers that can be used to her advantage, Kiyomi befriends him and asks him to solve minor issues for her. Soon word gets around of his powers amongst her friends, and the hotel staff, including Yumi Isomura and Takahiro Okuda who also try to get him to do things for him, often to his annoyance.

While initially using him for minor conveniences, and to assist the running of the hotel her friends and some of the hotel staff work together for some more major issues affecting the town.

== Cast ==
- Mikako Ichikawa as Kiyomi Endo
- Akihiro Kakuta as Kosuke Takahashi
- Kaho as Yumi Isomura
- Anne Suzuki as Hazuki Nakamura
- Kami Hiraiwa as Minami Hibino
- Maki Sakai as Eri Sawada
- Mirai Shida as Mizuki Manabe / "Mizupon"
- Mamoru Hagiwara as Takahiro Uemura
- Naoki Tanaka as Takahiro Okuda
- Rinko Kikuchi as Masako Umemoto
- Sosuke Ikematsu as Yuma Kishimoto
- Fumiyo Kohinata as Hirotaka Murakami

== Production ==
The series was filmed around the town of Fujiyoshida. The show has become popular enough in Japan that fans still form long queues to get into various real businesses that were used in filming

== Awards and nominations ==
Year	Award	Category	Recipient(s)	Result	Ref.
2025	18th Tokyo Drama Awards	Best Drama Series	The Hot Spot	Nominated	
2025	18th Tokyo Drama Awards	Best Supporting Actor	Akihiro Kakuta	Won	
2025	51st Hoso Bunka Foundation Prize	Best Drama Series	The Hot Spot	Nominated	
2025	51st Hoso Bunka Foundation Prize	Screenplay Award	Bakarythym	Won	
2025	51st Hoso Bunka Foundation Prize	Acting Award	Akihiro Kakuta	Won	
