= Nemuri no Mori =

- Based on: Nemuri no Mori by Keigo Higashino
- Directed by: Nobuhiro Doi
- Starring: Hiroshi Abe; Satomi Ishihara; Akira Emoto; Asahi Uchida
- Theme music composer: Yugo Kanno
- Country of origin: Japan
- Original language: Japanese

Original release
- Network: TBS
- Release: January 2, 2014

Nemuri no Mori (眠りの森 ～新参者スペシャル, Nemuri no Mori - Shinzanmono Special) is a 2014 Japanese feature-special directed by Nobuhiro Doi. It is based on the novel "Nemuri no Mori" (lit. Forest of Sleep) by Keigo Higashino.

== Plot ==
A man is found dead in an office of the Takayanagi Ballet Company. The suspect, who a dancer in the company, is found lying down unconscious in the same room. According to the suspect, the man was a robber who had tried to attack her. She insists that in self-defence, she hit him on the head and killed him. After a series of investigations, suspicions surrounding her claim begin to surface. Later on, the director of the Takayanagi Ballet Company is poisoned to death. Are the cases related?

== Cast ==
- Hiroshi Abe as Kyoichiro Kaga
- Satomi Ishihara as Mio Asaoka
- Kei Otozuki as Akiko Takayanagi
- Haruka Kinami as Haruko Saito
- Eiko Otani as Yasuko Morii
- Akira Emoto as Saisuke Ota
- Asahi Uchida as Toshiyuki Kazama

== Special Appearance by Yukie Nakama ==
At the beginning of the story, Kaga attends a ballet show with an omiai date arranged by his boss. His date, named Yamada, is played by Yukie Nakama. This is a cross reference to Hiroshi Abe and Yukie Nakama's respective lead roles as Jiro Ueda and Naoko Yamada in the famous mystery comedy series Trick. Kaga falls asleep and snores aloud during the show, which causes Yamada to turn him down. She does not appear in the story again.

== Reception ==
TC Entertainment praised the role of the film in the general economy of the Kyoichiro Kaga series.

== See also ==
- Shinzanmono
- The Wings of the Kirin
