= Rena Tanaka =

Japanese actress (born 1980)

- 田中 麗奈
- Born: 22 May 1980 (age 45); Kurume, Fukuoka, Japan
- Occupation: Actress
- Years active: 1995–present
- Website: www.tanakarena.co.jp

Rena Tanaka (田中 麗奈, Tanaka Rena; born 22 May 1980) is a Japanese actress. In 1999, she won the Japanese Academy Award for "Best Newcomer" for her performance in Give It All; in 2001, she received a "Best Actress" nomination for First Love.

== Selected filmography ==
=== Films ===
- Give It All (1998)
- GTO (1999)
- First Love (2000)
- Ekiden (2000)
- Suki (2001)
- Tokyo Marigold (2001)
- Gangushurisha (2002)
- Thirteen Steps (2002)
- Drugstore Girl (2003)
- A Day on the Planet (2004)
- Legend of Nin Nin Ninga Hattori (2004)
- Ubume no Natsu (2005)
- The Suspect: Muroi Shinji (2005)
- Tripping (2006)
- Waiting in the Dark (2006)
- Gegege no Kitaro (2007)
- Town of Evening Calm, Country of Cherry Blossoms (2007)
- The Silver Season (2008)
- 10 Promises to My Dog (2008)
- Mōryō no Hako (2008)
- Yamazakura (2008)
- The Taste of Fish (2008)
- Kitaro and the Millennium Curse (2008)
- Flowers (2010)
- The Days of Morisaki Bookstore (2010)
- Genji Monogatari: Sennen no Nazo (2011)
- Isoroku (2011)
- The Wings of the Kirin (2012), Tokiko Kanamori
- A Sower of Seeds (2012), Minori
- A Sower of Seeds 3 (2016), Minori
- Desperate Sunflowers (2016)
- The Katsuragi Murder Case (2016), Junko Hoshino
- Dear Etranger (2017)
- The Crimes That Bind (2018), Tokiko Kanamori
- Inubu: The Dog Club (2021), Mitsuko Kadowaki
- September 1923 (2023), Shizuko Sawada
- Where Love Goes (2023)
- Dare to Stop Us 2 (2024)
- Curling Dream (2024)
- Yukikaze (2025), Shizu Terasawa
- Strawberry Moon (2025), Miyoko Sakurai
- Night Flower (2025), Miyuki Hoshizaki
- The Stars and Moon are Holes in the Sky (2025), Chieko
- How to Steal the Gold (2026), Mikako
- Mag Mag (2026), Reiko Watase
- Wait Offshore (2026)

=== Television ===
- Taira no Kiyomori (2012), Yura Gozen
- Burning Flower (2015), Mōri Yasuko
- Akira and Akira (2017), Ai Kitamura
- North Light (2020)
- The Grand Family (2021)
- The Child of God Murmurs (2023)
- Boogie Woogie (2024), Omine
