= Second Virgin =

- Genre: Drama
- Written by: Shizuka Ooishi
- Directed by: Hiroshi Kurosaki; Tsuyoshi Yanagawa
- Starring: Kyōka Suzuki; Kyoko Fukada; Hiroki Hasegawa; You; Gō Ayano
- Theme music composer: Shigeru Umebayashi
- Ending theme: Anata dake ga (Kumi Koda)
- Composers: Kumi Koda, Markie
- Country of origin: Japan
- Original language: Japanese
- No. of episodes: 10

Original release
- Network: NHK
- Release: October 12 – December 14, 2010

Second Virgin (セカンドバージン) is a Japanese television drama series that aired on NHK in 2010.

== Cast ==
- Kyōka Suzuki as Rui Nakamura
- Kyoko Fukada as Marie Suzuki
- Hiroki Hasegawa as Kō Suzuki
- You as Akiko
- Gō Ayano as Ryō Nakamura

== Reception ==
Kyōka Suzuki won the Award for Best Actress at the 2011 Tokyo Drama Awards.
