= Mozu (film) =

2015 Japanese film

- Poster

Japanese name
- Kanji: 劇場版 MOZU
Transcriptions
- Revised Hepburn: Gekijōban Mozu
- Directed by: Eiichirō Hasumi
- Based on: Mozu by Go Osaka
- Starring: Hidetoshi Nishijima; Teruyuki Kagawa; Yōko Maki; Sosuke Ikematsu; Atsushi Itō; Hana Sugisaki; Tsuyoshi Abe; Yūsuke Iseya; Tori Matsuzaka; Hiroki Hasegawa; Fumiyo Kohinata; Takeshi Kitano
- Distributed by: Toho
- Release date: November 7, 2015
- Running time: 116 minutes
- Country: Japan
- Language: Japanese
- Box office: ¥864 million

Mozu (劇場版 MOZU, Gekijōban Mozu) is a 2015 Japanese suspense action film directed by Eiichirō Hasumi and based on the Mozu series by Go Osaka and its Japanese television drama series adaptation of the same name. It was released on November 7, 2015.

== Cast ==
- Hidetoshi Nishijima
- Teruyuki Kagawa
- Yōko Maki
- Sosuke Ikematsu
- Atsushi Itō
- Hana Sugisaki
- Tsuyoshi Abe
- Yūsuke Iseya
- Tori Matsuzaka
- Hiroki Hasegawa
- Fumiyo Kohinata
- Takeshi Kitano

== Reception ==
The film was number-one on its opening weekend, with ¥228.5 million. By its third weekend, it had grossed ¥864 million.
