= Quartet (Japanese TV series) =

- カルテット
- Written by: Yuji Sakamoto
- Directed by: Nobuhiro Doi; Fuminori Kaneko; Toshio Tsuboi
- Starring: Takako Matsu; Hikari Mitsushima; Issey Takahashi; Ryuhei Matsuda
- Theme music composer: Ringo Sheena
- Ending theme: 《おとなの掟》- Doughnuts Hole
- Country of origin: Japan
- Original language: Japanese
- No. of episodes: 10

Production
- Producers: Nobuhiro Doi; Ayumi Sano
- Running time: 54 min (including ads)

Original release
- Network: Tokyo Broadcasting System Television
- Release: January 17 – March 21, 2017

Quartet (カルテット, Karutetto) is a Japanese television drama, broadcast from January 2017 to March 2017 on the TBS television network. It stars Takako Matsu, Hikari Mitsushima, Issei Takahashi, and Ryuhei Matsuda.

== Synopsis ==
Four musicians meet at a karaoke bar in Tokyo and decide to form a quartet. They move into a house in Karuizawa to rehearse and perform at a local restaurant and music hall.

== Cast ==
- Takako Matsu as Maki Maki, first violin, whose husband disappeared a year earlier
- Hikari Mitsushima as Suzume Sebuki, cellist, with mysterious past
- Issey Takahashi as Yutaka Iemori, violist
- Ryuhei Matsuda as Tsukasa Beppu, second violin, whose grandfather owns the house they are living in.
- Riho Yoshioka as Alice Kisugi, a waitress at Nocturne Restaurant and Music Hall
- Takeshi Tomizawa as Daijiro Tanimura, chef at Nocturne restaurant and music hall
- Akiko Yagi as Takami Tanimura, manager of Nocturne Restaurant & Music Hall
- Mummy-D as Atsushi Handa
- Masako Motai as Kyoko Maki, Maki Maki's mother-in-law who thinks Maki killed her son and hires Suzume to spy on her

== Awards ==
Ceremony	Category	Nominees	Result
10th Tokyo Drama Awards	Best Drama Series	Quartet	Nominated

Year	Award	Category	Recipients	Result
2017	92nd Television Drama Academy Awards	Best Drama		Won
2017	92nd Television Drama Academy Awards	Best Actress	Takako Matsu	Won
2017	92nd Television Drama Academy Awards	Best Supporting Actress	Riho Yoshioka	Won
2017	92nd Television Drama Academy Awards	Best Screenwriter	Yuji Sakamoto	Won
2017	92nd Television Drama Academy Awards	Best Director	Nobuhiro Doi, Kaneko Fuminori, Tsuboi Toshio	Won
2017	92nd Television Drama Academy Awards	Best Theme song	Otona no Okite	Won
2017	7th Confidence Award Drama Prizes	Best Drama		Won
2017	7th Confidence Award Drama Prizes	Best Actress	Takako Matsu	Won
2017	7th Confidence Award Drama Prizes	Best Supporting Actor	Issey Takahashi	Won
2017	7th Confidence Award Drama Prizes	Best Script		Won
2017	7th Confidence Award Drama Prizes	Best Newcomer	Riho Yoshioka	Won
