= Layangan Putus =

2021 Indonesian television series

- Genre: Drama; Romance
- Created by: Manoj Punjabi
- Based on: Layangan Putus by Mommy ASF
- Screenplay by: Oka Aurora
- Directed by: Benni Setiawan
- Creative director: Shania Punjabi
- Starring: Reza Rahadian; Putri Marino
- Theme music composer: Prinsa Mandagie
- Opening theme: "Sahabat Dulu" by Prinsa Mandagie
- Ending theme: "Sahabat Dulu" by Prinsa Mandagie
- Composer: Ricky Lionardi
- Country of origin: Indonesia
- Original languages: Indonesian; English
- No. of seasons: 1
- No. of episodes: 10

Production
- Executive producers: Dhamoo Punjabi; Jeff Han; Kaichen Li; Lesley Simpson
- Producer: Manoj Punjabi
- Production locations: Jakarta, Indonesia.
- Cinematography: Aryo Chiko
- Editors: Firdauzi Trizkiyanto; Muhammad Rizal
- Camera setup: Multi-camera
- Running time: 25—42 minutes
- Production company: MD Entertainment

Original release
- Network: WeTV; Iflix; RCTI; MDTV
- Release: 26 November 2021 – 22 January 2022

Layangan Putus (transl. Broken Kite) is an Indonesian drama streaming television series produced by Manoj Punjabi under MD Entertainment. Written by Oka Aurora and directed by Benny Setiawan, the story is based on a viral story that started with a story written on social media which was continued into a novel entitled Layangan Putus, written by the same person as pen name Mommy ASF. It starred Reza Rahadian, Putri Marino, and Anya Geraldine. The series premiered on WeTV and iflix as a WeTV original series on 26 November 2021, and also aired on RCTI on 9 February 2022. It went off-air on 22 January 2022.

== Plot ==
Kinan always feels that her household is a kite, with Aris and herself as masters. Now she is faced with the fact that Aris has another lover behind her; threatens her household to become a broken kite that doesn't aim at all.

== Cast ==
=== Main ===
- Reza Rahadian as Aris Pratama Sugarda: Kinan's ex-husband; Lydia's lover; Raya's father.
- Putri Marino as Kinan Aripurnami: Aris's ex-wife, Raya's father, Lola and Dita's best friend.
- Anya Geraldine as Lydia Permata Danira: Aris's lover, Raya's teacher.
- Frederika Alexis Cull as Miranda: Aris's business partner, Eros' ex-wife, Brandon's mother.
- Graciella Abigail as Bulan Raya Sugarda: Aris and Kinan's daughter.

=== Recurring ===
- Ruth Marini as Atun: Kinan's maid.
- Lala Choo as Lastri: Kinan's maid.
- Raquel Katie as Lola: Kinan's lawyer, Kinan and Dita's best friend.
- Michelle Wanda as Dita: Kinan and Lola's best friend.
- Marthino Lio as Andre Davianto: Dita, Lola and Kinan's best friend.
- Ivan Kabul as Dr. Wira: Kinan's doctor.
- Yorda Emily as Farida: Kinan's mother.
- Ricky Wattimena as Alif Baihaqqi: Aris and Irfan's best friend.
- Brian Andrew as Dion Tanoto / Dion James Chandra: Lydia's business partner.
- Rayhan Cornelis as Brandon: Miranda and Eros's son.
- Nita Sofiani as Merry: Kinan's neighbors.
- Arif Brata as Irfan: Aris and Alif's best friend.
- Kamal Hafid as Jodi
- Stevana Dinda Rizky as Eros: Miranda's ex-husband, Brandon's father.
- Hendy Han as Freddy Wijaya: Aris's lawyer.
- Ilona Cecilia Budiman as Raya's mother friend school.
- Gendis Dewanti as Kilo Lounge Waiter.

== Episodes ==
No. overall	No. in season	Title	Directed by	Written by	Original release date
1	1	"EP01A"	Benni Setiawan	Oka Aurora	26 November 2021
In 2021 Jakarta, Kinan is happily wed to Aris. She tells him one night that she wishes to go to Cappadocia, Turkey with him to fly a hot-air-balloon. They have a daughter named Raya, and several years later, Kinan is pregnant again with a boy she names Reno. Everyone is oblivious to the fact that Aris is having an affair with another woman; he repeatedly forges scenarios and Kinan accepts them despite moderate suspicion.
2	1	"EP01B"	Benni Setiawan	Oka Aurora	26 November 2021
Kinan's suspicion grows with Aris citing work to excuse absence from family. She also observes that his shirts have a strange fragrance. She suspects his friend Miranda, but learns that Raya's English teacher, Lidya Danira, is on a trip to Bandung, at the same time Aris claims to be on a business trip there. Lidya lies to Kinan that she is on a business trip to Surabaya. Learning that she is wearing the same earring found on Aris' shirt, Kinan tracks down Miranda who goes to a hotel room, but learns that she is with another man named Jodi. Aris is revealed to be with Lidya.
3	2	"EP02A"	Benni Setiawan	Oka Aurora	26 November 2021 (Note: 3 December 2021 for non-subscribers)
When Aris learns that the earring he gifts to Lidya is missing a pair (the one Kinan found), he immediately goes home and claims it is a gift for Kinan, who apologizes to him and Miranda. Aris uses the pseudonym "Jack Office" to conceal Lydia's identity. He claims to Miranda that hormonal imbalance is a cause of Kinan's actions, but Miranda, who had been pregnant twice, tells him hormones do not affect instinct, and speculates Aris is having an affair.
4	2	"EP02B"	Benni Setiawan	Oka Aurora	26 November 2021 (Note: 4 December 2021 for non-subscribers)
Aris denies Miranda's speculation. Miranda tells Kinan that she is having an affair with Jodi due to her failing marriage with a man named Eros. Aris' descriptions of "Jack Office" is contradictory.
5	3	"EP03A"	Benni Setiawan	Oka Aurora	3 December 2021 (Note: 10 December 2021 for non-subscribers)
Lydia expresses sentiment that Aris is not fully hers, but Aris reassures that part of his love goes to her. Kinan slowly falls into a state of anxiety as her suspicion maintains. Raya is sentimental on her father's frequent absence at home.
6	3	"EP03B"	Benni Setiawan	Oka Aurora	4 December 2021 (Note: 11 December 2021 for non-subscribers)
Kinan confronts Aris for not spending much time with family; Aris apologizes and promises to make it up to her and Raya, but instead spends the day with Lydia. When Kinan calls Aris due to gestational hypertension, he and Lidya are having sex. Kinan collapses and her maids, Atun and Lastri, bring her to the hospital.
7	4	"EP04A"	Benni Setiawan	Oka Aurora	10 December 2021 (Note: 17 December 2021 for non-subscribers)
Aris learns of Kinan's critical condition. The doctor explains that further complications would mean Reno must be aborted. Raya distances from her father. Aris claims that his phone shattered at a construction site; Kinan forgives him. Kinan's mother Farida urges Aris to put more attention on his wife, or her blood pressure will rise and she will suffer pre-eclampsia.
8	4	"EP04B"	Benni Setiawan	Oka Aurora	11 December 2021 (Note: 18 December 2021 for non-subscribers)
Lola and Dita speculate that Aris is having an affair. Kinan adds "Jack Office" to her contacts, and with the help of Lola, learns that "Jack Office" is actually Lidya. Raya and Miranda's son Brandon become troubled in school due to their familial problems. Miranda sees Aris and Lidya having sex at Aris' car.
9	5	"EP05A"	Benni Setiawan	Oka Aurora	17 December 2021 (Note: 24 December 2021 for non-subscribers)
Miranda tells Aris to not reveal her affair or she will reveal his. When Lydia is in a job interview to be a child psychologist, the clinic's marketing manager Dion falls in love with her. Raya and Brandon reconcile. Andre advises that Dita reveal Aris' affair if she wishes to stop it. Lydia becomes Brandon's psychologist and meets Miranda. When Lydia says that Brandon's behavior stems from his dysfunctional family, Miranda asks if Raya might face the same fate.
10	5	"EP05B"	Benni Setiawan	Oka Aurora	18 December 2021 (Note: 25 December 2021 for non-subscribers)
Lydia vents about Miranda to Aris, who reassures her. When meeting Lydia's friend Inka, Kinan forges as Lydia's cousin Sari (an anagram of 'Aris'). Inka later tells about this to Lydia, who tells this to Aris, who reassures her again. Raya tells her mother regarding Brandon and Lydia. Aris claims to his friends that Lydia is his client. Kinan dreams of Aris teaching her how to fly a kite, but as he goes to play with Raya, he is unable to hear her, and the kite's string breaks.
11	6	"EP06A"	Benni Setiawan	Oka Aurora	24 December 2021 (Note: 31 December 2021 for non-subscribers)
Lydia says she is sick of the affair's secreted nature, and tells Aris to choose either her or Kinan. Kinan learns that Lydia is applying as Raya's school psychologist, and asks her to therapize Raya; Lydia accepts to try win Raya's sympathy. Miranda tells Eros she wants a divorce and Brandon flees. Dion says he will stop flirting if Lydia plans to marry Aris, unknowing of their nature.
12	6	"EP06B"	Benni Setiawan	Oka Aurora	25 December 2021 (Note: 1 January 2021 for non-subscribers)
Brandon moves to another school. Miranda tells Kinan that she is having divorce, and the two become friends. Aris takes Lydia to Capadoccia and leaves his location ambiguous to everyone, causing Kinan to suffer another onset of hypertension. Kinan speculate that Aris had most likely begun his affair since her pregnancy. Lola reveals that she discovered Aris had embarked on an international flight, and per the manifest, Aris sat next to Lydia. When Aris returns, Kinan confronts him, and they begin insulting each other, killing Reno.
13	7	"EP07A"	Benni Setiawan	Oka Aurora	31 December 2021 (Note: 7 January 2021 for non-subscribers)
Kinan falls into a state of depression. When Lydia tells that she thinks Reno's death is her fault, Aris assures otherwise. Farida reminds Aris she had a bad intuition on him ever since he proposed. When Aris suggests that Kinan get over her grief, she blames him for Reno's death.
14	7	"EP07B"	Benni Setiawan	Oka Aurora	1 January 2022 (Note: 8 January 2021 for non-subscribers)
In a spur of anger, Aris makes out with Lidya and Kinan ruins Reno's room. When Lola comforts her, Kinan says she is overwhelmed by her marriage's collapse. After Kinan goes home soaked visiting Reno's grave, Aris apologizes and tells her "Don't do this to me"; they then briefly make out. The next day, Kinan downloads Telegram, forges as Aris, and sets up a dinner between Aris and Lidya.
15	8	"EP08A"	Benni Setiawan	Oka Aurora	7 January 2022 (Note: 14 January 2021 for non-subscribers)
Kinan shows up at the dinner, warning legal action. Lola agrees to be Kinan's lawyer, and tells Aris he can be prisoned for up to nine years based on Article 284 of the Criminal Code. If Aris wants to forgo the charges, he must leave Lydia. Aris' friends urge him to do so. They present to him a lawyer, Freddy Wijaya, who tells him to fight dirty, though says that charges are inevitable. The next day, Freddy tells Lola and Kinan that their evidences are not enough.
16	8	"EP08B"	Benni Setiawan	Oka Aurora	8 January 2022 (Note: 15 January 2021 for non-subscribers)
Freddy calls out Kinan is in a relationship with Andre. Lola tells Freddy his knowledge of law is outdated. Kinan assures Raya that her parents will not divorce. Aris expresses reluctance to break up with Lidya. While driving, Aris tries to call Kinan and gets hit by a truck. Lidya arrives at the hospital and claims to be Aris' wife, angering Kinan. The thoracotomy is a success.
17	9	"EP09A"	Benni Setiawan	Oka Aurora	14 January 2022 (Note: 21 January 2021 for non-subscribers)
Aris is discharged, while Lidya gets close with Dion. After hearing her parents arguing, Raya tells them a story she wrote about a lion, Leo, who marries a lioness named Lolita. Leo hurts her but they reconcile healthily. Raya tells them that is her wish. Kinan stops scouring for evidence, saying that for a one-year relationship, Aris and Lidya will struggle to break up, and says she cannot blame them for being in love. Despite his apology, Aris goes to Lidya's apartment; Kinan tracks them down.
18	9	"EP09B"	Benni Setiawan	Oka Aurora	15 January 2022 (Note: 22 January 2021 for non-subscribers)
Kinan catches them exiting the apartment; Aris says he will not leave Lidya for her. Lola presents Kinan with two options: she can go on a long divorce process and get Raya's custody, or allow for polygamy but able to sue Aris in case he has an affair with another woman again. Dita criticizes her for bringing up the latter, and expresses regret that she does not marry with Andre who is in love with her. Upon Lola's advice, Kinan agrees tohave Raya stay at Lidya's apartment, where Aris reveals he plans a polygamous relationship. Lidya confronts Aris for his false promise on marriage.
19	10	"EP10A"	Benni Setiawan	Oka Aurora	17 January 2022 (Note: 21 January 2021 for VIP subscribers; 28 January 2021 for non-subscribers)
Raya and Kinan does not agree on Aris and Lidya, while Lidya's parents accept. Aris tells his friends that sooner or later, Kinan will have to consent due to her trauma on her dysfunctional family when she was a teenager, thinking she would not divorce him as it would make Raya unhappy. Andre advises that Kinan be strict and decisive. Aris tells Andre not to be with her again as he still has feelings for Kinan, but Andre says that he respects Kinan's decision while Aris does not. Aris has sex with Lidya at his and Kinan's bed, with Lidya wanting to feel what it feels to be Kinan, and Kinan becomes sick.
20	10	"EP10B"	Benni Setiawan	Oka Aurora	17 January 2022 (Note: 22 January 2021 for VIP subscribers; 29 January 2021 for non-subscribers)
Kinan decides to treat Lidya kinder, saying with great reluctance she is ready to sacrifice her feelings by divorce. Ahe warns Lidya that Aris is non-monogamous; Lidya says she is firm on their marriage nevertheless. The next day, Aris learns that Kinan is filing a lawsuit against him, this time bringing more robust photographic evidences; she also reveals she knows he had sex with Lidya in her room. Kinan wins the lawsuit, and custody of Raya is handed towards her. She then gives her wedding ring back to Aris, and wishes pass on her lessons of marriage to adult Raya.

== Reception ==
The series Layangan Putus has been watched more than 15 million times in one day and several positions occupy the trending during the week. This series also successfully became a show that entered the ranks of "trending" in 25 countries.

== In popular culture ==
The clip from an episode where the lead character Kinan (Putri Marino) say "It’s my dream, not her" went viral due to Kinan expresses her emotions to Reza Rahadian who plays Aris who has an affair with her.
