= Love That Makes You Cry =

- Promotional poster
- Genre: Drama; Romance
- Written by: Yūji Sakamoto
- Directed by: Michiko Namiki; Yūsuke Ishii; Mai Takano
- Starring: Kasumi Arimura; Kengo Kora
- Ending theme: "Asu e no Tegami" (明日への手紙) by Aoi Teshima
- Country of origin: Japan
- Original language: Japanese
- No. of episodes: 10

Production
- Producer: Ken Murase
- Running time: 54 minutes

Original release
- Network: Fuji TV
- Release: January 18 – March 21, 2016

Love That Makes You Cry (いつかこの恋を思い出してきっと泣いてしまう) is a Japanese television drama series premiered on Fuji TV from January 18, 2016, on Mondays at 21:00. It was written by Yūji Sakamoto starring Kasumi Arimura and Kengo Kora.

== Synopsis ==
Love That Makes You Cry follows the story of love, friendship and growth of six young men and women who move from countryside to the big city of Tokyo, each with their own dreams and aspirations. Among them is Sugihara Oto and Soda Ren. After her mother died, Oto was raised by adoptive parents in Hokkaido. Although she has given up on having any high hopes or big dreams for her future, she still remains positive and faces life with optimistic attitude. One day, she finds out the fact that her adoptive parents are planning to marry her to the wealthy man in town in order to solve their financial debt. Soda Ren was raised by his grandfather in Fukushima. Ren works hard on one job after another in order to earn the money to buy back his grandfather's land so that they can start farming again. By chance, Oto and Ren meet in Hokkaido and they decide to move to Tokyo to find new life to change their fate and future. However, as soon as they arrive in Tokyo, they get separated in the crowds... -- Fuji TV

== Cast ==
- Kasumi Arimura as Oto Sugihara
- Kengo Kora as Ren Soda
- Mitsuki Takahata as Kihoko Hinata
- Takahiro Nishijima (AAA) as Asahi Ibuki
- Aoi Morikawa as Konatsu Ichimura
- Kentaro Sakaguchi as Haruta Nakajo

== Episodes ==
No.	Title	Directed by	Original release date	Ratings (%)
1	"失くした手紙が繋いだ奇跡…二人は出逢った"	Michiko Namiki	January 18, 2016	11.6
2	"東京編スタート 都会の現実、募る想い…もう一度会いたい戻れない距離"	Michiko Namiki	January 25, 2016	9.6
3	"突然のキス、幸せな1日"	Yūsuke Ishii	February 1, 2016	10.0
4	"あなたを好きになりました"	Mai Takano	February 8, 2016	8.9
5	"第一部・完結編 突然のさよなら…訪れた運命の日"	Michiko Namiki	February 15, 2016	8.8
6	"衝撃の再会"	Yūsuke Ishii	February 22, 2016	10.7
7	"明かされる真実 彼に何が起きたのか"	Mai Takano	February 29, 2016	8.9
8	"好きです"	Michiko Namiki	March 7, 2016	8.8
9	"決意のとき、別れの夜"	Yūsuke Ishii	March 14, 2016	9.4
10	"永遠の約束"	Michiko Namiki	March 21, 2016	10.2

== Reception ==
The first episode received the highest viewership rating of 11.6% in the Kantō region, and the average was 9.7%.

== Recognitions ==
Year	Ceremony	Category/Recipient
2016	3rd CONFiDENCE Award Drama Prize	Best Drama
2016	3rd CONFiDENCE Award Drama Prize	Best Original Screenplay (Yuji Sakamoto)
2016	3rd CONFiDENCE Award Drama Prize	Best Newcomer (Takahiro Nishijima)
2016	88th Television Drama Academy Awards	Best Actor (Kengo Kora)
2016	9th International Drama Festival in Tokyo	Excellence Award for Drama Series
2016	9th International Drama Festival in Tokyo	Theme Song Award ("Asu e no Tegami" by Aoi Teshima)

== International adaptations ==
A Turkish remake called Aşk Ağlatır produced by Faruk Bayhan, debuted on September 8, 2019, on Show TV.

Preceded by 5-ji Kara 9-ji Made: Watashi ni Koi Shita Obōsan; October 12, 2015 – December 14, 2015	Fuji TV Getsuku Drama; Mondays 21:00 – 21:54 (JST)	Succeeded by Love Song; April 11, 2016 – June 13, 2016
