= Nobuhiro Doi =

Japanese television and film director (born 1964)

- Born: April 11, 1964 (age 62); Hiroshima
- Occupations: television director and film director

Nobuhiro Doi (土井裕泰, Doi Nobuhiro; born 11 April 1964) is a Japanese television and film director.

== Education ==
Nobuhiro Doi graduated from Waseda University School of Economics and Politics.

== Works ==
=== TV series ===
- Aoi Tori (1997)
- Terms for a Witch (1999)
- Beautiful Life (2000)
- Strawberry on the Shortcake (2001)
- Friends (2002, miniseries)
- Season of the Sun (2002s)
- Good Luck!! (2003)
- Nemuri no Mori (2014)
- Dr. Storks (2015-2017)
- Quartet (2017)
- In This Corner of the World (2018)
- Sins of Kujo (2026)

=== Films ===
- Be with You (2004)
- Tears for You (2006)
- Hanamizuki (2010)
- The Wings of the Kirin (2012)
- Flying Colors (2015)
- The Voice of Sin (2020)
- We Made a Beautiful Bouquet (2021)
- Unreachable (2025)
- A Moon in the Ordinary (2025)
- Sins of Kujo: The Movie (2027)
