= Mozu (TV series) =

- Directed by: Eiichirō Hasumi
- Starring: Hidetoshi Nishijima; Teruyuki Kagawa; Yoko Maki
- Country of origin: Japan
- Original language: Japanese
- No. of seasons: 2

Production
- Production company: Robot Communications

Original release
- Network: TBS; WOWOW
- Release: April 2014

Mozu (styled MOZU) is a Japanese police television drama series. It premiered in April 2014. The series has two seasons: Mozu no sakebu yoru (百舌の叫ぶ夜), broadcast on TBS, and Maboroshi no Tsubasa (幻の翼), broadcast on WOWOW. A film adaptation based on the series, Gekijōban Mozu, was released on November 7, 2015.

== Cast ==
- Hidetoshi Nishijima
- Teruyuki Kagawa
- Yoko Maki
