= The Wings of the Kirin =

2012 Japanese film by Nobuhiro Doi

- Film poster advertising this film in Japan
- Directed by: Nobuhiro Doi
- Screenplay by: Takeharu Sakurai
- Based on: The Wings of the Kirin by Keigo Higashino
- Produced by: Jun'ichi Shindō; Tamako Tsujimoto
- Starring: Hiroshi Abe; Yui Aragaki; Junpei Mizobata; Rena Tanaka; Kiichi Nakai
- Cinematography: Hideo Yamamoto
- Edited by: Junnosuke Hogaki
- Music by: Yugo Kanno
- Production companies: Film Face; TBS; LesPros Entertainment; MBS; Dentsu; Kodansha; CBC; RKB Mainichi Broadcasting; Shigeta Office; Hokkaido Broadcasting
- Distributed by: Toho
- Release date: January 28, 2012 (Japan)
- Running time: 129 minutes
- Country: Japan
- Language: Japanese
- Box office: $19,773,978

The Wings of the Kirin (Japanese: 麒麟の翼 〜劇場版・新参者〜, Hepburn: Kirin no Tsubasa: Gekijōban Shinzanmono) is a 2012 Japanese mystery crime film directed by Nobuhiro Doi.

== Plot ==
A man's body is found under the statue of a winged kirin in the Nihombashi area of Tokyo. A suspect named Yashima has a car accident and falls unconscious while he is attempting to run away. Yashima's lover Kaori comes from Fukushima and tells detectives that he is absolutely not a criminal. Meanwhile, Detective Kyoichiro Kaga's (Hiroshi Abe) investigates and uncovers a point of contact between the dead body and Yashima. A hidden fact of the victim is revealed which even his children did not know about...

== Cast ==
- Hiroshi Abe as Kyoichiro Kaga
- Yui Aragaki
- Kiichi Nakai
- Junpei Mizobata
- Rena Tanaka
- Tori Matsuzaka
- Kento Yamazaki
- Seiya
- Seika Taketomi
- Takahiro Miura
- Hitori Gekidan
- Meisa Kuroki
- Natsuko Akiyama
- Tsutomu Yamazaki (Special appearance)
- Yutaka Matsushige
- Shingo Tsurumi
- Yutaka Matsushige
- Tokio Emoto

== See also ==
- Shinzanmono
