= Koshi Mizukami =

Japanese actor (born 1999)

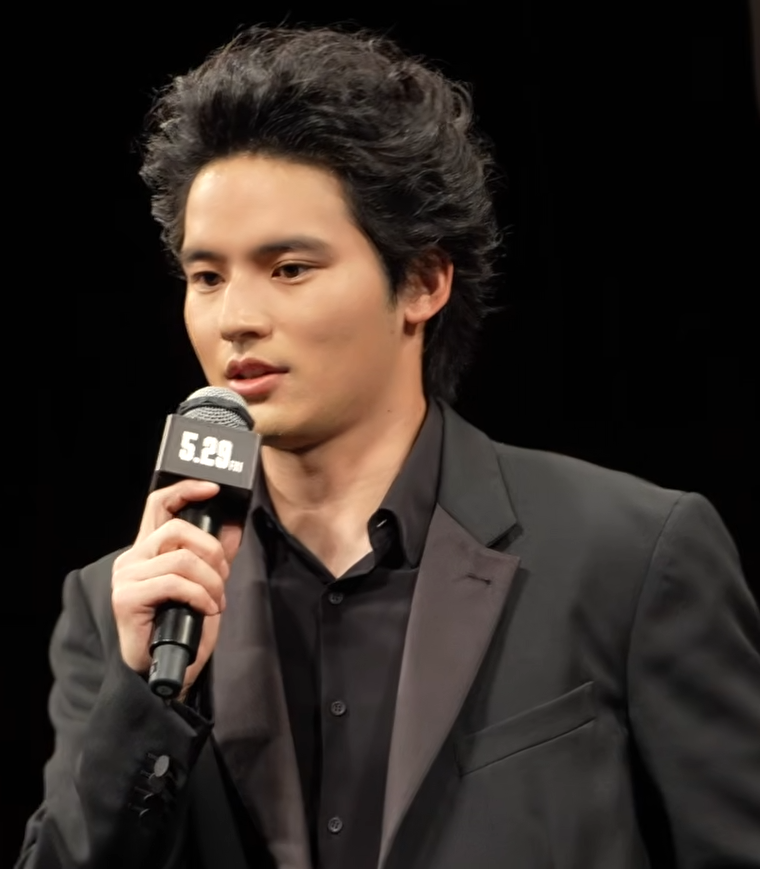
- Mizukami at the premiere of Tokyo Burst: Crime City in 2026
- Born: 12 May 1999 (age 27); Higashi ward, Fukuoka Prefecture, Japan
- Other names: Kenshi Okada; Koji Mizukami (Note: His name can also be romanized as Koji or Kouji Mizukami)
- Education: Soseikan High School
- Occupation: Actor
- Years active: 2018–present
- Agent: HAKU.LLC
- Notable work: Meet Me After School; Till We Meet Again on the Lily Hill
- Spouse: Unknown (m. 2026)

Japanese name
- Kanji: 水上 恒司
- Hiragana: みずかみ こうし
Transcriptions
- Romanization: Mizukami Kōshi
- Website: koshimizukami.com

Koshi Mizukami (水上 恒司(みずかみ こうし), Mizukami Kōshi; born 12 May 1999) is a Japanese actor. Until August 2022, he worked under the stage name Kenshi Okada (岡田 健史).

== Early life ==
Mizukami was born on 12 May 1999 in Higashi ward, Fukuoka Prefecture. He started playing baseball in the second grade of elementary school and mainly served as a catcher. He graduated from Soseikan High School. In addition, Riku Kawahara of the professional baseball team Hanshin Tigers was a junior in the baseball club, Mizukami was a catcher and Kawahara was a pitcher.

== Career ==
In the winter of his first year of junior high school, he was first scouted by the entertainment agency Spice Power (the male division of talent agency Sweet Power). After that, he was pursued by the agency for five years, but he kept turning down the offer as he was immersed in baseball and was aiming to play in Koshien.

In 2017, after departing from the baseball club when he was in his third year of high school, he was scouted by a teacher who was an adviser to the drama club, he agreed to play as a kamikaze member in a work called Hair Combing August and participated in the prefectural high school drama competition. This work would win the highest award at the Kyushu block of the prefectural competition and was recommended for the national competition. However, this did not come to be due to the format of the high school drama competition, which is held within the year up to the block competition and the national competition, but Mizukami graduated from high school in that subsequent year, thus he was unable to compete for the national competition. Originally, he had planned to go to college and continue playing baseball, but after participating in the prefectural tournament, he began to desire becoming an actor. After being initially opposed to his choice, his parents finally changed their minds after being impressed by his acting debut.

After auditioning for the television drama Meet Me After School on TBS, which started broadcasting in October 2018, he was selected as the main character's partner, portrayed by Kasumi Arimura, and made his debut as an actor. For this work he received the Newcomer Award at the 28th TV Life Annual Drama Awards.

In July 2019, he starred in the special drama commemorating the 50th anniversary of the opening of Fukuoka Broadcasting Don't You Think Girls Who Talk in Hakata Dialect Are Cute?.

In 2020 he made his film debut in the movie All About March, he then appeared in his second television drama MIU404

In December 2020, he won first place in the "NEXT" category of the popular voting project "National Treasure Class Handsome Ranking" in the second half of 2020 of the women's fashion magazine ViVi.

In 2021, he appeared in the NHK Taiga drama Reach Beyond the Blue Sky. On March 19 of the same year, he won the New Actor Award in the 44th Japan Academy Award for three works; All About March, The Legacy of Dr. Death: Black File, and Hope.

In May 2021, he filed a provisional injunction with the court to cancel the contract with his agency, Mizukami agreed to continue working with the same agency until the expiration of the contract at the end of March 2023, and not to renew the contract after expiration, and a settlement was reached.

On 31 August 2022, he announced that his contract with his agency had ended ahead of schedule and that he would continue his activities under his real name, Koshi Mizukami. In September, he formed a business alliance with the company HAKU.

On 14 February 2023, it was announced that he would play the character, Aisuke Murayama, in the NHK serial television drama Boogie Woogie. In the same year, Mizukami starred alongside Haruka Fukuhara in the film Till We Meet Again on the Lily Hill, which was released on December 8, 2023. For his role as kamikaze pilot Akira Sakuma, he was nominated for the Best Actor Award at the 47th Japan Academy Film Prize. The film also became a box office hit, grossing over ¥4 billion.

== Personal life ==
On February 28, 2026, Mizukami announced via his agency that he had married an ordinary woman and that they are already expecting their first child.

== Filmography ==
=== Film ===
Year	Title	Role	Notes	Ref.
2020	All About March	Ayumu		
2020	Hope	Tadashi Ishikawa		
2020	The Legacy of Dr. Death: Black File	Kei Sawada		
2020	The Untold Tale of the Three Kingdoms	Sun Quan		
2021	Caution, Hazardous Wife: The Movie	Juri Iwao		
2021	And So the Baton Is Passed	Kento Hayase		
2022	Lesson in Murder	Masaya Kakei	Lead role	
2023	Mentalese Express	Shinji Hayashi	Lead role; Taiwanese short web film	
2023	Out	Kaname Abe		
2023	Till We Meet Again on the Lily Hill	Akira Sakuma	Lead role	
2024	After the Fever	Hayato		
2024	Hakkenden: Fiction and Reality	Inukai Genpachi		
2024	The Real You	Kishitani		
2024	The Voices at War	Toshiki Asakura		
2025	Kowloon Generic Romance	Hajime Kudo	Lead role	
2025	Dream Animals: The Movie	Elephant (voice)		
2025	The Bird Is Calling	Yuji Kuki	Lead role	
2025	Wind Breaker	Haruka Sakura	Lead role	
2026	Tokyo Burst: Crime City	Shiro Aiba	Lead role; Japanese–Korean film	
2026	Till We Meet Again on the Starry Hill	Akira Sakuma		
2026	F(r)iction	Tada	Lead role	
2027	Underdog	Masayuki Okano	Lead role	
2027	Kuroneko	Ryo	Lead role	

=== Television drama ===
Year	Title	Role	Notes	Ref.
2018	Meet Me After School	Akira Kuroiwa		
2019	Don't You Think Girls Who Talk in Hakata Dialect Are Cute?	Miyako Azuma	Lead role; single-episode drama	
2019	If You Follow Me, It's Over	Sotaro Nakamura	Lead role; web series	
2019	Doctor-X: Surgeon Michiko Daimon season 6	Kiyoaki Yokkaichi	Episode 4	
2020	My Dear Nina	Atsushi Toyama	Lead role; web series	
2020	MIU404	Yohito Kokonoe		
2020	The Tale of Oedo Monsters	Kazuma Shinkai	Lead role	
2020	This is The Last Summer	Kaoru Fujii	Lead role; short drama	
2020	True Horror Stories 2020	Yōhei Ōno	Lead role; single-episode drama	
2021	Another Story of the Tower of Sakura	Yuma Togashi	Lead role; web series	
2021	Reach Beyond the Blue Sky	Odaka Heikurō	Taiga drama	
2021	Administrator King	Yuta Hirayama		
2021	Date My Daughter!	Hikaru Irino		
2023	Cinderella of Midsummer	Sōsuke Hayakawa		
2023	The War of the Announcers	Toshiki Asakura	Television film	
2023	Boogie Woogie	Aisuke Murayama	Asadora	
2024	Golden Time: The Story of Kintaro Hattori	Kintarō Hattori (young adult)	Television film	
2024	Blue Moment	Yugo Sonobe		
2025	Monster	Yashiro Masato	Lead role	
2025	Synanthrope	Kennosuke Tonari	Lead role	
2026	Soul Mate	Oikawa		
2026	Criminal	Shuji	Lead role	

=== Narration ===
Year	Title	Notes	Ref.
2019	Telementary "Telling Hiroshima-Nagasaki Peace Messenger"		
2020	Serial meal TV essay “I want to eat with you”		
2022	Heartnet TV "Who am I? Children born with AID"		

== Awards and nominations ==
Year presented, name of the award ceremony, category, nominee(s) of the award, and the result of the nomination
Year	Award ceremony	Category	Nominated work(s)	Result	Ref.
2018	28th TV Life Annual Drama Awards	Newcomer of the Year	Meet Me After School	Won	
2020	33rd Nikkan Sports Film Awards	Yūjirō Ishihara Newcomer Award	All About March, The Legacy of Dr. Death: Black File, and Hope	Won	
2021	44th Japan Academy Film Prize	New Actor Award	All About March, The Legacy of Dr. Death: Black File, and Hope	Won	
2024	47th Japan Academy Film Prize	Best Actor	Till We Meet Again on the Lily Hill	Nominated	
2025	49th Elan d'or Awards	Newcomer of the Year	Himself	Won	

== Bibliography ==
=== Photobook ===
- "Kodou" (12 June 2019)

=== Calendar ===
- "Kenshi Okada Calendar 2020.04 – 2021.03" (14 February 2020)
- "Kenshi Okada Calendar 2021.04 – 2022.03" (12 February 2021)
