= Gintama (film) =

2017 Japanese action comedy film

- Theatrical release poster
- Kanji: 銀魂
- Directed by: Yuichi Fukuda
- Screenplay by: Yuichi Fukuda
- Based on: Gin Tama by Hideaki Sorachi
- Starring: Shun Oguri; Masaki Suda; Kanna Hashimoto; Yuya Yagira; Ryo Yoshizawa; Masami Nagasawa; Masaki Okada; Nakamura Kankurō VI; Tsuyoshi Dōmoto
- Production companies: Aniplex; BNP; Bandai; Dentsu; GyaO; Marui; Plus D; Shueisha; TV Tokyo; Top Coat; Tristone Entertainment Inc.; Warner Bros. Pictures Japan
- Distributed by: Warner Bros. Pictures Japan
- Release date: July 14, 2017 (Japan)
- Running time: 131 minutes
- Country: Japan
- Language: Japanese
- Box office: $47.5 million

Gintama (銀魂) is a 2017 Japanese jidaigeki action comedy film written and directed by Yuichi Fukuda, starring Shun Oguri and based on the manga series of the same name written and illustrated by Hideaki Sorachi. It was released on July 14, 2017, in Japan by Warner Bros. Pictures. The theme song for the film was titled "DECIDED" by UVERworld.

== Plot ==
Yorozuya receives two similar and ultimately connected jobs: Elizabeth needs Odd Jobs to find Katsura, and a swordsmith needs the crew to find a dangerous sword named Benizakura. There is more to both requests than Gintoki and his friends thought.

== Cast ==
- Shun Oguri as Gintoki Sakata
- Masaki Suda as Shinpachi Shimura
- Kanna Hashimoto as Kagura
- Yuya Yagira as Toshiro Hijikata
- Hirofumi Arai as Nizo Okada
- Ryo Yoshizawa as Sougo Okita
- Akari Hayami as Tetsuko Murata
- Tsuyoshi Muro as Gengai Hiraga
- Masami Nagasawa as Tae Shimura
- Masaki Okada as Kotaro Katsura
- Mikako Takahashi as the voice of Sadaharu
- Kōichi Yamadera as the voice of Shoyo Yoshida
- Takayuki Yamada as the voice of Elizabeth
- Seiji Rokkaku as Char Aznable
- Jiro Sato as Henpeita Takechi
- Nanao as Matako Kijima
- Seika Furuhata as Christel Ketsuno
- Ken Yasuda as Tetsuya Murata
- Nakamura Kankurō VI as Isao Kondo
- Tsuyoshi Dōmoto as Shinsuke Takasugi

== Production ==
Principal photography took place in July, August and early September 2016. On the New Year's Day 2017, they celebrated it with a little song and dance routine by the main casts of the film. Encore Films announced on January 3, 2017, it will release the film alongside Tokyo Ghoul in Malaysia, Singapore, and Indonesia in mid-2017. On March 22, 2017, they revealed on set photos which had taken in Ibaraki Prefecture on August 24, 2016. On May 15, 2017, the staff of the film revealed that Galigali Galixon would appear in that film. On May 29, the staff confirmed to replace the scenes which Galixon appears in the film due to being arrested on May 12. Later, Encore Films confirmed the Singaporean release on July 13, 2017.

== Box office ==
The film grossed ¥3.9 billion ($34.6 million) in Japan, making it the third highest-grossing domestic film of 2017. Overseas, the film grossed CN¥81.358 million ($12.3 million) in China, HK$2.19 million ($281,014) in Hong Kong, $45,128 in Thailand, and $228,569 in South Korea, Australia and New Zealand. This adds up to a total box office gross of $47,455,832 in the Asia-Pacific region.

== Awards ==
Award	Category	Nominee	Result
30th Nikkan Sports Film Award	Best Actor	Shun Oguri	Nominated
30th Nikkan Sports Film Award	Best Newcomer	Kanna Hashimoto	Nominated

== Web series ==
A drama was released as extra material, adapting "The Okita Mitsuba Arc" from the manga and anime, with many of the original cast from the film, including Shun Oguri and most of The Shinsengumi live action portrayals.

== Sequel ==
A sequel, Gintama 2: The Law is Surely There to be Broken (銀魂2 掟は破るためにこそある, Gintama 2: Okite wa Yaburu Tame ni Koso Aru) was released on August 17, 2018. Most of the actors from the first movie played the same role in the sequel. New cast members included Haruma Miura as Kamotaro Ito, Masataka Kubota as Bansai Kawakami and Midoriko Kimura as Otose.
