= Out (manga) =

Japanese manga series

- First tankōbon volume cover

アウト (Auto)
- Manga
- Written by: Tatsuya Iguchi
- Illustrated by: Makoto Mizuta
- Published by: Akita Shoten
- Imprint: Young Champion Comics
- Magazine: Young Champion
- Original run: June 12, 2012 – present
- Volumes: 29
- Live-action film
- Directed by: Hiroshi Shinagawa
- Written by: Hiroshi Shinagawa
- Studio: Kadokawa Daiei Studio
- Released: November 17, 2023

Out (アウト, Auto) is a Japanese manga series written by Tatsuya Iguchi and illustrated by Makoto Mizuta. It began serialization in Akita Shoten's Young Champion magazine in June 2012. A live-action film adaptation premiered in November 2023.

== Plot ==
17-year-old Iguchi Tatsuya has just been released from juvenile detention and is on probation. He has been relocated to a new area, away from the bad influence of his old friends, and is under the care of his aunt.

Tatsuya is determined to not be sent back to the lock up, and thus works hard in his aunt's restaurant. However, he still has the same personality, the same tendency to violence, and still falls in with the same sort of people.

It is going to be difficult for him to stay out of trouble.

== Media ==
=== Manga ===
Written by Tatsuya Iguchi and illustrated by Makoto Mizuta, Out began serialization in Akita Shoten's Young Champion magazine on June 12, 2012. The series' chapters have been compiled into twenty-nine tankōbon volumes as of April 2026.

No.	Release date	ISBN
1	November 8, 2012	978-4-253-15116-0
2	March 8, 2013	978-4-253-15117-7
3	August 20, 2013	978-4-253-15118-4
4	January 20, 2014	978-4-253-15119-1
5	May 20, 2014	978-4-253-15120-7
6	November 20, 2014	978-4-253-15121-4
7	May 20, 2015	978-4-253-15122-1
8	July 17, 2015	978-4-253-15123-8
9	December 18, 2015	978-4-253-15124-5
10	May 20, 2016	978-4-253-15125-2
11	November 18, 2016	978-4-253-14171-0
12	May 19, 2017	978-4-253-14172-7
13	October 20, 2017	978-4-253-14173-4
14	March 19, 2018	978-4-253-14174-1
15	August 20, 2018	978-4-253-14175-8
16	February 20, 2019	978-4-253-14176-5
17	August 20, 2019	978-4-253-14177-2
18	January 20, 2020	978-4-253-14178-9
19	July 20, 2020	978-4-253-14179-6
20	February 19, 2021	978-4-253-14180-2
21	June 18, 2021	978-4-253-30501-3
22	February 18, 2022	978-4-253-30502-0
23	October 20, 2022	978-4-253-30503-7
24	June 20, 2023	978-4-253-30504-4
25	October 19, 2023	978-4-253-30505-1
26	June 19, 2024	978-4-253-30506-8
27	February 19, 2025	978-4-253-30507-5
28	October 20, 2025	978-4-253-00468-8
29	April 20, 2026	978-4-253-01307-9

=== Live-action film ===
A live-action film adaptation was announced in October 2022. The film was written and directed by Hiroshi Shinagawa and starred Yuki Kura, Kotaro Daigo and Koshi Mizukami in lead roles. The film's theme song, "Hideout", is performed by JO1. It premiered in Japanese theaters on November 17, 2023.

== Reception ==
The series had 6.5 million copies in circulation by September 2023.
