= Chūgakusei Nikki =

Japanese manga series and its adaptations

- First tankōbon volume cover

中学聖日記
- Manga
- Written by: Junko Kawakami
- Imprint: Feel Comics
- Magazine: Feel Young
- Original run: June 7, 2013 – present
- Volumes: 6
- Television drama
- Directed by: Ayuko Tsukahara; Kentarō Takemura; Toshio Tsuboi
- Written by: Arisa Kaneko
- Music by: Akira Kosemura
- Original network: TBS
- Original run: October 9, 2018 – December 18, 2018
- Episodes: 11

Chūgakusei Nikki (Japanese: 中学聖日記; lit. "Middle School Hijiri Diary", alternatively titled Meet Me After School internationally for the live-action television drama adaptation) is a Japanese manga series by Junko Kawakami. Chūgakusei Nikki is serialized in the monthly josei manga magazine Feel Young since June 2013. A live-action drama began airing in October for the Fall 2018 season.

== Plot ==
Akira Kuroiwa, a third year middle school student, falls in love with his new homeroom teacher, Hijiri Suenaga. Akira struggles with these feelings knowing their age gap and the fact that Hijiri already has a longtime boyfriend who she is engaged to. Akira is disheartened at first, but things change by the time he is 18, when Hijiri has broken up with her fiancé.

== Characters ==
=== Main characters ===
Hijiri Suenaga (末永聖, Suenaga Hijiri)
Portrayed by Kasumi Arimura (drama)
Hijiri is a 25-year-old teacher at a middle school. Her students often refer to her by her first name instead of addressing her as a teacher.
Akira Kuroiwa (黒岩晶, Kuroiwa Akira)
Portrayed by Kenshi Okada (drama)
Akira is the narrator of the story. As a 14-year-old student in Hijiri's 9th grade class, he slowly discovers that he is in love with her. By volume 3, he is a second year student in high school and his feelings towards her have not changed.
Shotaro Kawai (川合勝太郎, Kawai Shōtarō)
Portrayed by Keita Machida (drama)
Shotaro is Hijiri's longtime boyfriend and fiance, whom she has dated since college. The two currently maintain a long distance relationship due to Shotaro's job. While Shotaro is in Osaka, his superior, Ritsu, begins flirting with him, complicating their relationship. Eventually, he and Hijiri break up in volume 4.

=== Supporting characters ===
Runa Iwasaki (岩崎るな, Iwasaki Runa)
Portrayed by Rina Ono (drama)
Runa is Akira's strong-willed classmate and friend. She is in love with Akira.
Junichiro Kokonoe (九重順一郎, Kokonoe Jūnichirō)
Portrayed by Jiei Wakabayashi (drama)
Junichiro is Akira's classmate and friend. He is the class clown and also a troublemaker.
Ritsu Haraguchi (原口律, Haraguchi Ritsu)
Portrayed by Yo Yoshida (drama)
Ritsu is Shotaro's superior at work. She begins flirting with him and eventually falls in love.
Aiko Kuroiwa (黒岩愛子, Kuroiwa Aiko)
Portrayed by Yui Natsukawa (drama)
Aiko is Akira's mother. As a single mother, she tries to juggle his emotional well-being along with her job. She gets along very well with Hijiri until she finds out Akira is in love with her.

== Media ==
=== Manga ===
Written and illustrated by Junko Kawakami, Chūgakusei Nikki started in Shodensha's josei manga magazine Feel Young on June 7, 2013. Shodensha has collected its chaptets into individual tankōbon volumes. The first volume was released on July 8, 2016. As of May 8, 2020, six volumes have been released.

==== Volumes ====
No.	Japanese release date	Japanese ISBN
1	July 8, 2016	978-4-396-76676-4
2	August 8, 2016	978-4-396-76678-8
3	October 7, 2017	978-4-396-76716-7
4	July 20, 2018	978-4-396-76741-9
5	December 17, 2018	978-4-396-76754-9
6	May 8, 2020	978-4-396-76791-4

=== Television drama ===
A live-action television series adaptation was announced in July 2018 and slated for release in October 2018. The series is directed by Ayuko Tsukahara, Kentarō Takemura, and Toshio Tsuboi, with Arisa Kaneko writing the script. The series stars Kasumi Arimura as Hijiri, Kenshi Okada as Akira (in his debut acting role), and Keita Machida as Shōtarō. Additional cast members include Yui Natsukawa as Aiko (Akira's mother), Yo Yoshida as Ritsu, and Mari Natsuki as Shiotani. Two original characters were also created for the television series and included Makita Sports as Shigeru and Tomochika as Chizuru. The television series aired weekly on TBS at 10 PM.

The first episode of the live-action series gained at 6.0% viewership, with many viewers expressing discomfort at the subject matter of the series. Despite that Akira is 15 years old in the series, the production opted to cast 19-year-old Okada as they could not hire an actor closer to the character's age.

==== Episodes ====
No.	Title	Written by	Original release date	Japan viewership rating
1	"Teacher and Student... a Love Story About a Forbidden Pure Love"; Transliteration: "Kyoshi to Seito... Yurusarenai Kinshi no Junai Rabu Sutōrī" (Japanese: 教師と生徒…許されない禁断の純愛ラブストーリー)	Ayuko Tsukahara	October 9, 2018	6.0%
2	"Unstoppable Awakening of Love... The Opening Act of the Disturbance at the Athletic Festival"; Transliteration: "Tomaranu Koigokoro... Haran no Taiikusai no Maku ga Aku" (Japanese: とまらぬ恋心…波乱の体育祭の幕が開く)	Ayuko Tsukahara	October 16, 2018	6.5%
3	"Feelings Finally Overwhelm at the Intimate Study Sleepover!"; Transliteration: "Tsui ni Afuredasu Omoi Kyūsekkin Benkyō Gasshuku!" (Japanese: ついに溢れ出す想い急接近の勉強合宿!)	Ayuko Tsukahara	October 23, 2018	6.2%
4	"A Sudden Breakthrough! On the Night of the Firework Festival, the Gears of Fate Begin to Turn!"; Transliteration: "Kyūtenkai! Hanabi Taikai no Yoru, Unmei no Haguruma ga Mawari Hajimeru!" (Japanese: 急展開! 花火大会の夜、運命の歯車が回りはじめる!)	Kentarō Takemura	October 30, 2018	5.4%
5	"A Failure as a Teacher! The Repercussions of a Forbidden Love... What Will Be Her Decision?!"; Transliteration: "Kyōshi Shikkaku! Kindan no Koi no Daishō… Kanojo ga Kudashita Ketsudan wa?!" (Japanese: 教師失格! 禁断の恋の代償…彼女が下した決断は!?)	Toshio Tsuboi	November 6, 2018	6.5%
6	"Three Years Later... A Love That Begins in a New Life... Unforgettable Emotions..."; Transliteration: "San-nen Ato... Arata na Seikatsu Ugoki Hajimeru Koi... Wasurarenai Omoi" (Japanese: 3年後…新たな生活動き始める恋...忘れられない想い)	Toshio Tsuboi	November 13, 2018	7.0%
7	"Suddenly, the Past is Exposed?! Each and Every Painful Emotion..."; Transliteration: "Tsui ni Abakareru Kako!? Sorezore no Setsunai Omoi..." (Japanese: ついに暴かれる過去!? それぞれの切ない思い…)	Toshio Tsuboi	November 20, 2018	6.3%
8	"Goodbye, Ms. Suenaga... Putting Their Lives on Elopement! The Fated Decision and Confession"; Transliteration: "Sensei Sayōnara... Inochikake no Tōhikō! Unmei no Ketsudan to Kokuhaku" (Japanese: 先生さようなら... 命懸けの逃避行! 運命の決断と告白)	Ryōsuke Fukawa	November 27, 2018	7.5%
9	"The First Night with Just the Two of Us... I Won't Let You Go Anymore!"; Transliteration: "Hajimete no Futari Dake no Yoru… Mou Hanasanai!" (Japanese: 初めての2人だけの夜…もう離さない!)	Kentarō Takemura	December 4, 2018	7.8%
10	"Their Mutual Feelings are a Sin...?! The Moms Stand in the Way"; Transliteration: "Omoiau no wa Tsumi!? Tachi wa Dakaru Haha-tachi" (Japanese: 想い合うのは罪…!?立ちはだかる母たち)	Toshio Tsuboi	December 11, 2018	7.3%
11	"Thrusted With the Ultimate Choice! The Two Finally Choose Their Future"; Transliteration: "Tsukitsuerareta Kyūkoku no Sentaku! Futari ga Saigo ni Erabu Mirai" (Japanese: 突きつけられた究極の選択! ふたりが最後に選ぶ未来)	Kentarō Takemura	December 18, 2018	9.6%

== Reception ==
Chugakusei Nikki won the 7th Anan Manga Awards in 2016.
