= Tokyo Boogie-Woogie =

Japanese popular song from 1947

"Tokyo Boogie Woogie 東京ブギウギ"

Song by Shizuko Kasagi
- Language: Japanese
- Released: 1947
- Genre: Boogie Woogie, Kayōkyoku, Swing music
- Length: 3:06
- Songwriter: Masaru Suzuki
- Composer: Ryōichi Hattori

Tokyo Boogie Woogie (東京ブギウギ) is the name of a song by Japanese singer Shizuko Kasagi.

== Overview ==
Shizuko Kasagi came to stardom after being noticed by composer Ryōichi Hattori, who composed many of her songs including this one.

Hattori was on a train, and as he was listening to the rail joints and the handrail hitting the edge of the luggage rack, he came up with the songs melody. He got off the train to go to a coffee shop where he wrote the songs sheet music on a napkin.

Hattori found that everything was full of melancholy after the war, and he wanted to create something that would uplift people. Some of the lyrics were criticized as not making sense, however upon its release these criticisms would prove to be in vain as the song saw almost immediate success.

Shizuko Kasagi began recording the song 3 months after giving birth, and would put her baby to sleep in her dressing room to sing and dance.

The song was released in 1947.

== Reception ==
The song was released in 1947, and did very well, getting acclaim and popularity within the first 2 to 3 months.

The song provided comfort to the Japanese following the war, and uplifted many. It was customary for Japanese singers to sing songs standing still, however Kasagi would perform "flamboyant dance routines" which added to her, and the songs, appeal. Kasagi, who had been dancing "vigorously" since before and during the war, received warnings about her dancing during the war, but she continued her dancing once the war ended.

It became one of the most popular songs of its time.

== Legacy ==
The song was published in the United States by Columbia Records in 1953. Shizuko herself re-recorded the song in 1955.

The song was covered by many singers including Hibari Misora, once known as "Baby Kasagi" before she eclipsed Kasagi.

In 2022, the NHK announced their new morning drama, "Boogie Woogie" based on the life of Kasagi. This bought renewed attention to Kasagi and her music, especially Tokyo Boogie Woogie, which was released on CD for the first time. The song was also covered by Japanese singers such as Mari Natsuki.
