= Hatsume no Tsubone =

Fictional female ninja

Hatsume no Tsubone (初芽局) is a fictitious Japanese woman from the Sengoku period. She is famous as the main character of the semi-historical novel Sekigahara by Ryōtarō Shiba. In the novel, she is a kunoichi (female ninja) sent by Tokugawa Ieyasu to spy on his political enemy Ishida Mitsunari before the Battle of Sekigahara.

== Narrative ==
In the 2017 film Sekigahara, based on Shiba's novel, Hatsume became a female ninja in Iga after serving as a maid of Toyotomi Hideyoshi's mother. She then fell in love with the character of Ishida Mitsunari and began working for him in the Western army. The director of the movie, Masato Harada, wanted to create a "boy meets a girl" type of romantic encounter.

Having served the Tokugawa, she walked freely in Edo to later inform Ieyasu's plans. After Hatsume betrayed Tokugawa Ieyasu and tried to kill him, Ieyasu had her condemned to death. She is said to have lodged at Sawayama castle in Omi province and has become a mistress of Mitsunari.

According to Shiba's novel, after Ishida Mitsunari's death at the Battle of Sekigahara, she disappeared from the historical records and her existence is debated.

== Popular culture ==
- Hatsume is played by Keiko Matsuzaka in the TV series Sekigahara (1981).
- Hatsume appears in various video games, such as Sengoku Taisen (2010) and Puzzle & Dragons (2012).
- Hatsume (played by Kasumi Arimura) is a protagonist character in the film Sekigahara (2017).
