= Shizuko Kasagi =

Japanese singer and actress (1914-1985)

Shizuko Kasagi 笠置 シヅ子
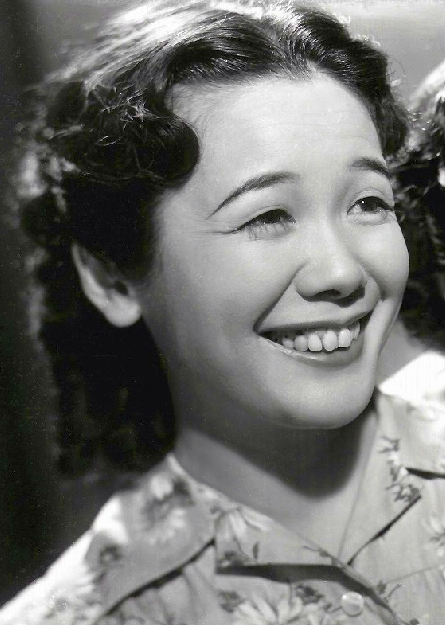
- Shizuko Kasagi in the film Ginza Kankan Musume

Background information
- Also known as: Shizuko Mikasa
- Born: Shizuko Kamei (亀井 静子); 25 August 1914; Ōkawa District, Kagawa, Japan
- Died: 30 March 1985 (aged 70) Tokyo, Japan
- Genre: Jazz
- Occupations: Singer, actress
- Years active: 1927–1985
- Label: Nippon Columbia
- Formerly of: Ryoichi Hattori

Shizuko Kasagi (Japanese: 笠置 シヅ子, Hepburn: Kasagi Shizuko; August 25, 1914 – March 30, 1985) was a Japanese jazz singer and actress. At the peak of her fame in the immediate post-war era, she earned the nickname the "Queen of Boogie" (ブギの女王, Bugi no Joō). Kasagi frequently sang songs composed by Ryōichi Hattori, including 1947's "Tokyo Boogie-Woogie", which remains her best-known work. Yoshinori Gyobe, a professor at Nihon University, said that with Hattori's bright boogie rhythms and Kasagi's lively singing of melodies that did not exist in Japan, the duo changed the image of Japanese music.

== Early life and career ==
Shizuko Kasagi was born Shizuko Kamei (亀井 静子) on 25 August 1914 in Ōkawa District, Kagawa. Her parents were unmarried, and her father died the following year. At six months old, Kasagi was adopted by a friend of her mother's in Osaka. She started learning Nihon-buyō at the age of four. At 13, she joined the Shochiku Gakugeki Club (predecessor of the OSK Nippon Opera Company). She originally took Shizuko Mikasa (三笠 静子) as her stage name, but eventually changed the spelling to 笠置 シズ子.

Kasagi got her big break in April 1938, when she moved to Tokyo to join the Shouchiku Kageki Dan. There she met Ryōichi Hattori, a composer signed to Nippon Columbia, who quickly recognized Kasagi's talent and went on to compose many songs for her, including "Sentimental Daina". According to Michael Furmanovsky of The Japan Times, their 1939 song "Rappa to Musume" was the first recording in Japanese music history to feature scat singing. However, during World War II, the Japanese government was cracking down on Western music, and the vigorously dancing Kasagi received directives from authorities to stand still, no farther than 1 meter from the microphone. Additionally, Kasagi suffered the deaths of her adoptive mother and her younger brother during this time. In 1943, she began a relationship with Eisuke Yoshimoto, a Waseda University student nine years her junior. He was the son of Sei Yoshimoto, founder of the entertainment conglomerate Yoshimoto Kogyo, who strongly opposed the relationship. After the war, she learned she was pregnant in October 1946. However, Eisuke died from tuberculosis on 19 May 1947, weeks before Kasagi gave birth to their daughter Eiko on 1 June. The couple had talked of marriage and Kasagi retiring, but she decided to raise their child as a single mother and continue her career. She recorded "Tokyo Boogie-Woogie" just three months later.

When released in January 1948, the upbeat and cheerful track became a hit amongst the Japanese people who were recovering after the nation's defeat in the war. Kasagi appeared in Akira Kurosawa's 1948 film Drunken Angel, performing the song "Jungle Boogie", the lyrics to which were written by the director. With further hits such as "Hey Hey Boogie", "Home Run Boogie" and "Kaimono Boogie", Kasagi was dubbed the "Queen of Boogie".

By the early 1950s, her popularity was being eclipsed by that of Hibari Misora, who was at one point dubbed "Baby Kasagi" (ベビー笠置). In 1955, Kasagi began concentrating on her acting career. She announced her retirement from singing in 1957.

== Death ==
Kasagi died from ovarian cancer on 30 March 1985, aged 70.

NHK's Asadora drama series Boogie Woogie, starting in October 2023, is based on Kasagi.

== Discography ==
- "Koi no Step" (恋のステップ; 1933)
- "Rappa to Musume (ラッパと娘; 1939)
- "Sentimental Daina" (センチメンタル・ダイナ)
- "Tokyo Boogie-Woogie" (東京ブギウギ; 1948)
- "Jungle Boogie" (ジャングル・ブギー; 1948)
- "Home Run Boogie" (ホームラン・ブギ; 1949)
- "Kaimono Boogie" (買物ブギー; 1950)

== Films ==
- Drunken Angel (1948)
- Hateshinaki Jonetsu (1949)
- Ginza Kankan Musume (1949)
- Endless Desire (1958)
- Sukurappu Shūdan (1968)
- Gendai Yakuza: Shinjuku no Yotamono (1970)
- Zubekō Banchō: Zange no Neuchi mo Nai (1971)
- Kigeki: Onna Ikitemasu (1971)
