= Boogie Woogie (Japanese TV series) =

2023–2024 Japanese television series

- Genre: Drama
- Written by: Shin Adachi; Tsuyoshi Sakurai
- Directed by: Yoshihiro Fukui; Daisuke Futami; Izumi Keimoto; Kou Suzuki; Makoto Bunkohara
- Starring: Shuri; Koshi Mizukami; Kodai Kurosaki; Kazuki Tsubasa; Kurumi Shimizu; Yuki Katayama; Rikka Ihara; Miu Tomita; Rinko Kikuchi; Koyuki; Hana Kino; Katsuhisa Namase; Asami Mizukawa; Yū Aoi; Tsuyoshi Kusanagi; Toshirō Yanagiba
- Narrated by: Kozo Takase
- Opening theme: "Happy☆Boogie" by Yoshie Nakano, Sakaiyuū, Shuri
- Composer: Takayuki Hattori
- Country of origin: Japan
- Original language: Japanese
- No. of episodes: 126

Production
- Producer: Kuniomi Hashizume
- Running time: 15 minutes
- Production company: NHK Osaka

Original release
- Network: NHK
- Release: October 2, 2023 – March 29, 2024

Boogie Woogie (Japanese: ブギウギ, Hepburn: Bugi Ugi) is a Japanese television drama series and the 109th Asadora series, following Ranman. It premiered on October 2, 2023 and concluded on March 29, 2024. The drama is modeled after the Japanese singer and actress Shizuko Kasagi, but it is produced as fiction and is an original drama work.

== Cast ==
=== Hanada's family ===
- Shuri as Suzuko Hanada
  - Rioka Sawai as young Suzuko
- Toshirō Yanagiba as Umekichi Hanada, Suzuko's father
- Asami Mizukawa as Tsuya Hanada, Suzuko's Mother
- Kodai Kurosaki as Rokuro Hanada, Suzuko's brother
- Kyoko Mitsubayashi as Toshi Onishi, Suzuko's Grandmother

=== Osaka ===
==== Umemaru Shoujo Kagekidan (USK) ====
- Kazuki Tsubasa as Aoi Tachibana
- Yū Aoi as Reiko Yamato
- Kurumi Shimizu as Sachiko Shirakawa / Lily Shirakawa
- Yuki Katayama as Tatsumi Sakuraba
- Rikka Ihara as Mitsuki Akiyama
- Yuuki Morinaga as Yoshio Matano
- Jun Hayashi as Hayashi
- Takeshi Masu as Okuma, Umemaru company CEO

==== Public bath "Hanayu ====
- Takeshi Nadagi as Ekisha
- Takashi Okabe as stupid old man
- Shohei Uno as Gonbei
- Kaoru Kusumi as Asa
- Kazuo Senoo as enthusiastic schoolteacher

=== Tokyo ===
- Tsuyoshi Kusanagi as Zenichi Hatori, Composer. He is modeled after Ryōichi Hattori
- Miwako Ichikawa as Mari Hatori, Zenichi's wife
- Rinko Kikuchi as Ritsuko Ibarada, singer. She is modeled after Noriko Awaya

=== Others ===
- Koshi Mizukami as Aisuke Murayama, Suzuko's husband
- Koyuki as Tomi Murayama, Aisuke's mother. She is modeled after Sei Yoshimoto, the co-founder of Yoshimoto Kogyo.
- Noriko Nakagoshi as Kinu Nishino, Suzuko's real mother.
- Natsumi Kon as Yoshiko Yamaguchi (Li Hsiang-lan)
- Katsuhisa Namase as Kenji "Tanaken" Tanahashi. He is modeled after Ken'ichi Enomoto.
- Miu Tomita as Sayo Kobayashi
- Jack Kennedy as Sam
- Sakura Kiryu as Ayumi Mizuki, Yoshio Matano and Reiko Yamato's daughter
- Takashi Naito as a detective
- Ryota Miura as Takeshi Shibamoto
- Hana Kino as Akiko Ōno

== Music ==
Many songs were used. The arrangement of all songs in the drama is by Takayuki Hattori, grandson of Ryōichi Hattori.

- Tokyo Boogie-Woogie

Suzuko Fukurai sings on stage at the Japanese Imperial Theater. The lyrics were written by Masaru Suzuki and the music was composed by Ryōichi Hattori.

- The bugle and daughter

Suzuko Fukurai sings on stage at the Japanese Imperial Theater. The lyrics were written and composed by Ryōichi Hattori.

- Shopping Boogie Woogie

Suzuko Fukurai sings on stage at the Japanese Imperial Theater. The lyrics were written and composed by Ryōichi Hattori.

- Farewell Blues

Ritsuko Ibarada sings in concert.

- Furusato (children's song)
- Soushunhu
- When the Saints Go Marching In
- Ye Lai Shan
- Habanera
- Hey hey Boogie Woogie

== TV schedule ==
Week	Episodes	Title	Directed by	Original airdate	Rating
1	1–5	"Wate Utaude" (ワテ、歌うで!, I'll sing)	Mitsuhiro Fukui	October 2–6, 2023	16.0%
2	6–10	"Waraukadonihahukukitaru" (笑う門には福来る, laughter is the key to happiness)	Takamasa Izunami	October 9–13, 2023	15.6%
3	11–15	"Momoirosougiya" (桃色争議, A pink dispute!)	Mitsuhiro Fukui	October 16–20, 2023	15.7%
4	16–20	"wate kagawaheikue" (ワテ、香川へ行くで, I'll go to Kagawa)	Wataru Suzuki	October 23–28, 2023	15.8%
5	21–25	"Honmanokazokuya" (ほんまの家族や, A real Family)	Wataru Suzuki	October 30–November 3, 2023	15.4%
6	26–30	"Badojizttenanya" (バドジズってなんや?, What is Badjiz)	Makoto Bonkobara	November 6–10, 2023	16.3%
7	31–35	"Giri to Koi to wate" (義理と恋とワテ, Duty, love and me)	Takamasa Izunami	November 13–17, 2023	16.3%
8	36–40	"Wate no Okaachan" (ワテのお母ちゃん, My mom)	Mitsuhiro Fukui	November 20–24, 2023	15.5%
9	41–45	"Kakashimitainawate" (カカシみたいなワテ, I'm like a scarecrow)	Takamasa Izunami	November 27–December 1, 2023	15.7%
10	46–50	"Oozora no Otouto" (大空の弟, Younger brother of the sky)	Makoto Bonkobara	December 4–8, 2023	16.2%
11	51–55	"Wateyorimojyumositaya" (ワテよりも十も下や, Ten years old below me)	Daisuke Hutami	December 11–15, 2023	15.6%
12	56–60	"AnatanoSuzuko" (あなたのスズ子, Your Suzuko)	Daisuke Hutami	December 18–22, 2023	15.9%
13	61–64	"ImagaIttchanSiawaseya" (今がいっちゃん幸せや, I'm the happiest I've ever been)	Mitsuhiro Fukui	December 25–28, 2023	15.2%
14	65–66	"Sensou to Uta" (戦争とうた, War and Songs)	Mitsuhiro Fukui	January 4–5, 2024	
15	67–71	"Waterahamoujiyuuya" (ワテらはもう自由や, We are free now)	Makoto Bonkobara	January 8–12, 2024	16.1%
16	72–76	"Watehawatedasu" (ワテはワテだす, I am me)	Makoto Bonkobara	January 15–19, 2024	16.2%
17	77–81	"Honma ni Hanaretounai" (ほんまに離れとうない, I really don't want to leave)	Takamasa Izunami	January 22–26, 2024	16.1%
18	82–86	"Anta to isshoniikirude" (あんたと一緒に生きるで, I'll live with you)	Daisuke Hutami	January 29–February 2, 2024	16.1%
19	87–91	"Tokyo Bugiugi" (東京ブギウギ, Tokyo Boogie Woogie)	Mitsuhiro Fukui	February 2–5, 2024	
20	92–96	"Watekatehissiya" (ワテかて必死や, I'm desperate)	Mitsuhiro Fukui	February 12–16, 2024	
21	97–101	"Anata ga Waraeba, Watashi mo warau" (あなたが笑えば、私も笑う, If you laugh, I will laugh too)	Makoto Bonkobara	February 19–23, 2024	
22	102–106	"A, Shindo" (あ〜しんど♪, Hey, Shindo)	Toyo Kojima	February 26–March 1, 2024	16.2%
23	107–111	"Mamii no Mamiiya" (マミーのマミーや, Mummy's mummy)	Daisuke Hutami	March 4–8, 2024	16.2%
24	112–116	"Mogottsuieekoya" (ものごっついええ子や, What a complicated child)	Daisuke Hutami	March 11–15, 2024	15.9%
25	117–121	"Zukizuki suru wa" (ズキズキするわ, It's throbbing)	Mitsuhiro Fukui	March 18–22, 2024	15.7%
26	122–126	"Seiki no Uta, Kokoro no Uta" (世紀のうた 心のうた, Song of the Century, Song of the Heart)	Mitsuhiro Fukui	March 25–29, 2024	
Average rating 15.9% - Rating is based on Japanese Video Research (Kantō region).

Preceded by Ranman	Asadora; October 2, 2023 – March 29, 2024	Succeeded by The Tiger and Her Wings
