= Ginza Kankan Musume =

1949 film by Koji Shima

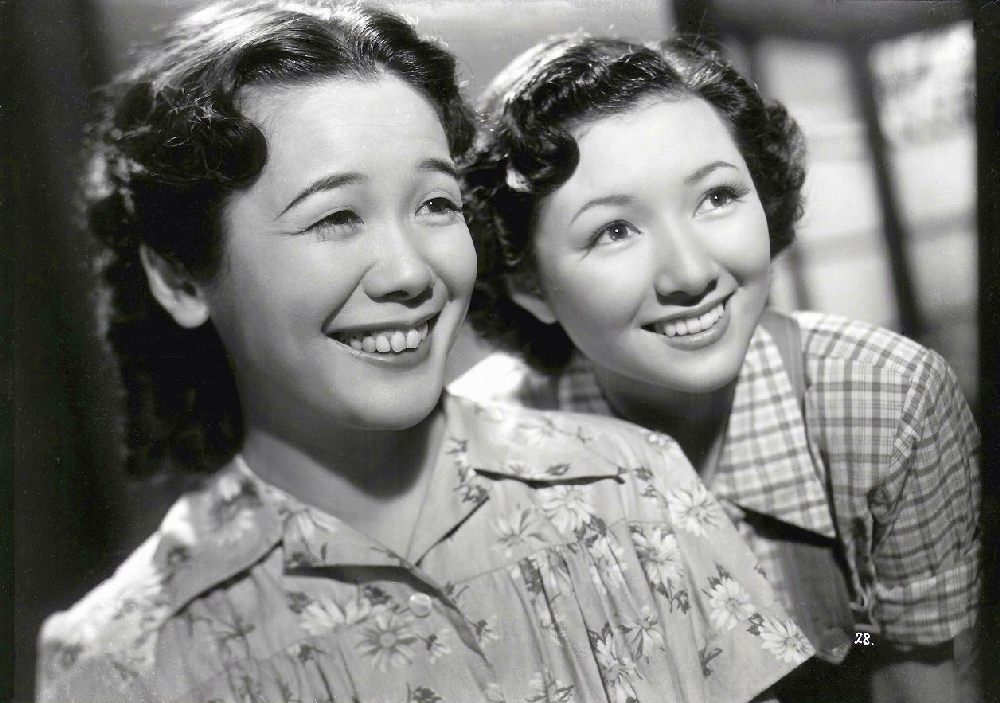
- Shizuko Kasagi (left) and Hideko Takamine (right) on a studio still
- Directed by: Koji Shima
- Written by: Kajirō Yamamoto; Haruyasu Nakada
- Starring: Shizuko Kasagi; Hideko Takamine; Katsuhiko Haida; Akira Kishii; Shinshō Kokontei
- Cinematography: Akira Mimura
- Edited by: Toshio Goto
- Music by: Ryōichi Hattori
- Production company: Shintoho
- Distributed by: Shintoho
- Release date: August 16, 1949 (Japan)
- Running time: 68 minutes
- Country: Japan
- Language: Japanese

Ginza Kankan Musume (Japanese: 銀座カンカン娘, Hepburn: Ginza kankan musume) (translation: Ginza Cancan Girls) is a 1949 black and white Japanese film directed by Koji Shima.

== Cast ==
- Shizuko Kasagi
- Hideko Takamine
- Katsuhiko Haida
- Akira Kishii
- Shinshō Kokontei
- Kumiko Mizuhara
- Atsuko Ichinomiya
- Kumeko Urabe
- Yōji Misaki
- Teruo Wakatsuki
- Kyōzō Fuyuki
- Fumio Okura
- Sanae Hattori
- Fumindo Matsuo
- Kenji Nakahara
- Ichirō Izawa
- Saburo Tani
- Ichiro Kodama
