= Masaki Okada =

Japanese actor (born 1989)

- 岡田 将生
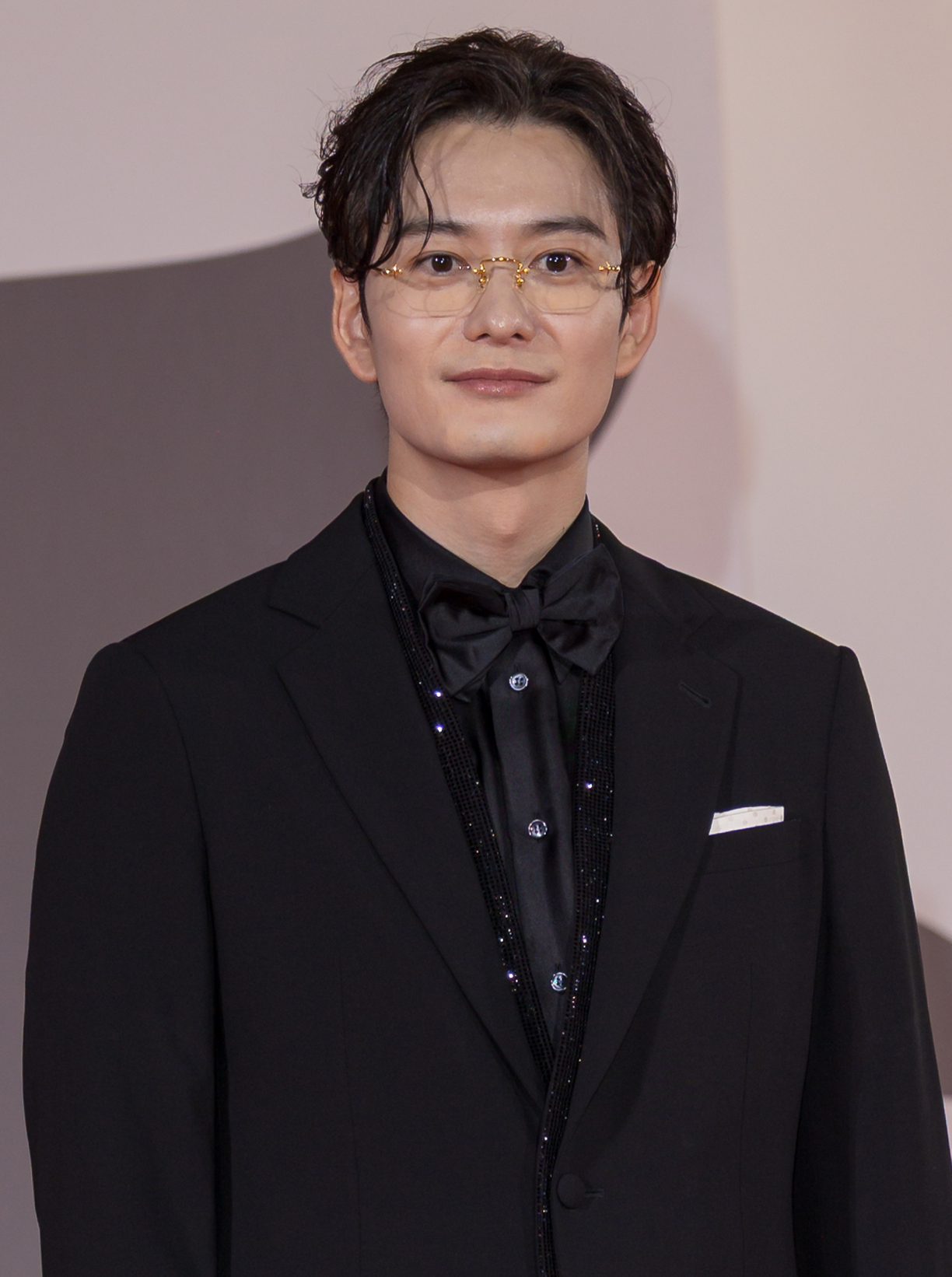
- Okada in 2025
- Born: August 15, 1989 (age 37); Edogawa-ku, Tokyo, Japan
- Occupation: Actor
- Years active: 2006–present
- Agent: Stardust Promotion

Masaki Okada (岡田 将生, Okada Masaki; born August 15, 1989 in Tokyo) is a Japanese actor.

== Personal life ==
On November 19, 2024, Okada and actress Mitsuki Takahata jointly announced through the media that they are getting married.

== Filmography ==
=== Films ===
- The Foreign Duck, the Native Duck and God in a Coin Locker (2007)
- Tennen Kokekkō (2007)
- Robo Rock (2007)
- Someday's Dreamers (2008)
- I Give My First Love to You, as Takuma Kakinouchi (2009)
- Honokaa Boy (2009)
- Gravity's Clowns (2009)
- Halfway (2009)
- Villain (2010)
- Confessions (2010)
- Piecing Me Back Together (2010)
- Raiou (2010)
- Princess Toyotomi (2011), as Asahi Gainsbourg
- Life Back Then (2011), as Kyohei Nagashima
- Akko-chan: The Movie (2012), as Naoto Hayase
- Space Brothers (2012), as Hibito Nanba
- Beyond the Memories (2013), as Roku Akazawa
- Mourning Recipe (2013), as Haru
- The Great Shu Ra Ra Boom (2015), as Ryosuke Hinode
- Oh! Father! (2014), as Yukio
- April Fools (2015)
- Strayer's Chronicle (2015)
- The Top Secret: Murder in Mind (2016), as Ikkou Aoki
- Someone (2016), as Takayoshi
- Gin Tama (2017), as Kotaro Katsura
- JoJo's Bizarre Adventure: Diamond Is Unbreakable Chapter I (2017), as Keicho Nijimura
- The Many Faces of Ito (2018), as Seijirō Itō
- Family Story (2018), as Takuya Kobayashi
- Gin Tama 2 (2018), as Kotaro Katsura
- Restaurant from the Sky (2019)
- Under the Stars (2020), as Minami
- The Night Beyond the Tricornered Window (2021), as Rihito Hiyakawa
- Drive My Car (2021), Kōji Takatsuki
- Cube (2021), Shinji Ochi
- Arc (2021)
- The Cursed Sanctuary X (2021), Teruo Yamada
- One Second Ahead, One Second Behind (2023), Hajime
- We're Millennials. Got a Problem?: The Movie (2023), Masakazu Sakama
- Gold Boy (2024), Noboru Higashi
- Last Mile (2024), Kō Nashimoto
- Angry Squad: The Civil Servant and the Seven Swindlers (2024), Makoto Himuro
- Yasuko, Songs of Days Past (2025), Hideo Kobayashi
- After the Quake (2025), Komura
- Scarlet (2025), Hijiri (voice)
- The Tiger and Her Wings: The Movie (2027), Kōichi Hoshi

=== Television ===
- Dear Students! (2007), Kaori Kinoshita
- Hana-Kimi (2007), Kyogo Sekime
- Kōshōnin (2008), episode 5
- Fukidemono to Imoto (2008)
- Homeroom on the Beachside (2008), Hiroki Negishi
- Otomen (2009), Masamune Asuka
- Wagaya no Rekishi (2010)
- The Golden Piggy (2010), Kudo Suguru
- Young Black Jack (2011), young Black Jack (Hazama Kurou)
- Taira no Kiyomori (2012), Minamoto no Yoritomo
- The Holy Monsters (2012), Kengo Shiba
- Future Diary (2012), Arata Hoshino
- Legal High 2 (2013), Haruki Hanyū
- Unhandy Handyman as Jun Takeyama (2015)
- The Memorandum of Kyoko Okitegami (2015), Yakusuke Kakushidate
- We're Millennials. Got a Problem? (2016), Masakazu Sakama
- Descending Stories: Showa Genroku Rakugo Shinju (2018), Yūrakutei Yakumo VIII (Kikuhiko)
- Natsuzora: Natsu's Sky (2019), Saitarō Okuhara
- Talio: Avenger Buddies (2020), Kensuke Kuroiwa
- My Dear Exes (2021), Shinshin Nakamura
- 1122: For a Happy Marriage (2024), Otoya Aihara
- Extremely Inappropriate! (2024), Naoki
- The Tiger and Her Wings (2024), Kōichi Hoshi
- After the Quake (2025), Komura
- Just a Bit Espers (2025), Kizashi

=== Music video appearances ===
- "Negaiboshi" by Showta, 2006
- "Ashita, Mata" by Alexandros, 2017

== Awards and nominations ==
Year presented, name of the award ceremony, category, nominee(s) of the award, and the result of the nomination
Year	Award ceremony	Category	Nominated work(s)	Result	Ref.
2009	34th Hochi Film Awards	Best New Artist	Gravity's Clowns and others	Won	
2009	22nd Nikkan Sports Film Awards	Best Newcomer	Gravity's Clowns and others	Won	
2010	52nd Blue Ribbon Awards	Best Newcomer	Gravity's Clowns and others	Won	
2010	34th Elan d'or Awards	Best Newcomer of the Year	Himself	Won	
2010	31st Yokohama Film Festival	Best Newcomer	Gravity's Clowns and others	Won	
2010	33rd Japan Academy Film Prize	Newcomer of the Year	Villain and Confessions	Won	
2025	48th Japan Academy Film Prize	Best Supporting Actor	Last Mile	Nominated	
