= Flying Colors (2015 film) =

- Official poster of Flying Colors
- ビリギャル
- Directed by: Nobuhiro Doi
- Screenplay by: Hiroshi Hashimoto
- Produced by: Jun Nasuda; Junichi Shindō
- Starring: Kasumi Arimura; Atsushi Itō; Shūhei Nomura; Yūhei Ōuchida; Kokoro Okuda; Yō Yoshida; Tetsushi Tanaka
- Cinematography: Yasushi Hanamura
- Edited by: Junnosuke Hogaki; Sayaka Yamamoto
- Music by: Eishi Segawa
- Distributed by: Toho
- Release date: May 1, 2015 (Japan)
- Running time: 117 minutes
- Country: Japan
- Language: Japanese
- Box office: ¥2.84 billion (US$23.6 million) (Japan)

Flying Colors (Japanese: ビリギャル, Hepburn: Biri Gyaru; Biri Gal) is a 2015 Japanese youth comedy drama film directed by Nobuhiro Doi. The film is based on the bestselling book Gakunen Biri no Gyaru ga 1 nen de Hensachi o 40 Agete Keio Daigaku ni Geneki Gokaku Shita Hanashi (学年ビリのギャルが1年で偏差値を40上げて慶應大学に現役合格した話) by Nobutaka Tsubota. The film was released on May 1, 2015 in Japan.

== Plot ==
Sayaka Kudo is a 'gyaru' who wears miniskirts and dyes her hair blonde. Although she is a second-year senior high school student, she is on par academically to 4th-grade elementary school students. She frequently transferred schools because she was unable to make friends. Eventually, she attends a private all-girls high school where she plays and enjoys her extra-scholarly activities while skipping study altogether - here, she is caught and suspended for carrying cigarettes.

To prepare her for her university entrance examination, her mother sends her to Seiho Cram School. When her tutor, Yoshitaka Tsubota, hears about Sayaka's academic problems, he makes it his personal goal to help her enter the university of her choice Keio University and to get back at her father.

Her father labels her as an "air-head" and says she and her mother are being scammed by the cram school. Likewise, she is repeatedly belittled by her high school teacher, who believes she is destined for failure. Sayaka becomes determined to study hard to prove them wrong. Over the course of the summer holidays of her second year, through to the exams at the end of her third year in high school, Sayaka works diligently, going without sleep to the extent that she nods off in her classes, forgoing dates with her friends, and dying her hair back to black and cutting it, to show her resolve. Her results progressively improve on practice tests and her academic deviation value increases tremendously from 30 to 70 in this short period. Despite facing numerous hardships along the way and nearly giving up, Sayaka, now with her whole family's support, is admitted to Keio University. The film concludes with a comedic montage of the various characters as they sing or dance to the ending song.

== Cast ==
- Kasumi Arimura as Sayaka Kudō
- Atsushi Itō as Yoshitaka Tsubota
- Shūhei Nomura as Reiji Mori
- Yūhei Ōuchida as Ryūta Kudō
- Kokoro Okuda as Mayumi Kudō
- Morio Agata as Makoto Minegishi
- Ken Yasuda as Takashi Nishimura
- Airi Matsui as Mika Honda
- Tetsushi Tanaka as Sayaka's Father
- Yō Yoshida as Sayaka's Mother

== Production ==
The title of the book on which the film is based can be translated as, "The story of a gal at the bottom of her school year who raised her standard score by 40 points in one year and got accepted into Keio University." Nobutaka Tsubota, the author, was the director of a private school. In the book, Nobutaka writes about his experiences with his real-life pupil Sayaka Kobayashi and how she improved from a high school student who only had the knowledge of 4th-year elementary school student to one who qualified for the prestigious Keio University in just 1.5 years. As of May 2015, the book had sold over 1 million copies.

The film Flying Colors was first unveiled to the Japanese media on 13 November 2014.

== Reception ==
The film grossed ¥285.1 million on its opening weekend at the Japanese box office. As of May 17, the film had grossed US$12.3 million. It was the eighth highest-grossing Japanese film (together with Love Live! The School Idol Movie) and the third highest-grossing Japanese live-action film at the Japanese box office in 2015, with ¥2.84 billion (US$23.6 million). The film was released in China on April 14, 2016, earning US$3.3 million on its opening weekend.

On Film Business Asia, Derek Elley gave the film a 7 out of 10, calling it "an entertaining time-waster that hides its didactic messages beneath likeable performances by the two leads".

=== Awards and nominations ===
Year	Ceremony	Category	Result
2015	40th Hochi Film Award	Best Supporting Actress (Yō Yoshida)	Won
2016	58th Blue Ribbon Awards	Best Actress (Kasumi Arimura)	Won
2016	58th Blue Ribbon Awards	Best Supporting Actress (Yō Yoshida)	Won
2016	39th Japan Academy Prize	Outstanding Performance by an Actress in a Leading Role (Kasumi Arimura)	Nominated
2016	39th Japan Academy Prize	Outstanding Performance by an Actor in a Supporting Role (Atsushi Ito)	Nominated
2016	39th Japan Academy Prize	Outstanding Performance by an Actress in a Supporting Role (Yō Yoshida)	Nominated
2016	39th Japan Academy Prize	Newcomer of the Year (Kasumi Arimura)	Won
