= Galigali Galixon =

Japanese comedian (born 1986)

- ガリガリガリクソン
- Born: Yusuke Sakamoto; February 19, 1986 (age 40); Itami, Hyōgo, Japan
- Education: Kansai University First High School; Osaka New Star Creation (NSC)
- Occupation: Comedian
- Years active: 2000–2017; 2018–present
- Agent: Yoshimoto Creative Agency
- Known for: Arabiki Dan; The Iromonea; Bakushō Red Carpet; Enta no Kamisama; NMB48 Works Part-time So "Meccha"
- Height: 1.76 m (5 ft 9 in)

Galigali Galixon (ガリガリガリクソン, Garigari Garikuson; born 19 February 1986, in Itami, Hyōgo, Japan) is a Japanese comedian. His real name is Yusuke Sakamoto (坂本 祐介, Sakamoto Yūsuke).

Galigali Galixon is represented with Yoshimoto Creative Agency in Osaka. He graduated from Kansai University First Junior High School and Kansai University First High School. Galigali Galixon won a degree from the Broadcasting Art College.

== Filmography ==
=== TV series ===
Year	Title	Network	Notes	Ref.
	Arabiki Dan	TBS		
	The Iromonea	TBS	Cleared the "Gold Rush" for three weeks and won	
	Bakushō Red Carpet	Fuji TV		
	Bakushō Pink Carpet	Fuji TV		
	Bakushō Tryout	NHK		
	On-Batt Plus	NHK-G	Resulted in one win and loss, up to 481 KB	
	Asa Para	YTV		
	Jalker Maxon	MBS		
	All That's Manzai	MBS		
	Shun-gē! Best 10	ABC	Ranked 49	
	Dai 41-kai Hatsumōde! Bakushō Hit Parad 2008	Fuji TV	Didn't appear in the Shinshun Golden Pink Carpet	
	Owarai Dynamite!	TBS		
	Umeka 24	KTV	Episode 21, "Byōsatsu: No. 1 Gyagā Kettei-sen"	
	Kirin no Heya	MBS	Infomercial	
	Honban de~su!	TV Tokyo	Episode 42	
	Lincoln	TBS	2 Hour Special	
	Sekaiichi Mijikai Gag-sai! Owarai Merry-go-round	TBS	Appeared in 21-seiki Edison corner	
	Muhaha no Takajin	KTV		
	Ima-chan no "Jitsu wa..."	ABC		
	Gokigen! Burannyu	ABC	As "Osaka Fat Boys" with Seitaro Mukai	
	Konya mo Hustle	Sun TV	Studio guest	
	Enta no Kamisama	NTV		
	Oja Mama! F	KTV		
2009	Tu's Day Comics: Samurai Tuto	TBS		
2010	Hami Dasu Sainō Kyōiku Variety!! Koyabu Starion	ABC		
2010	UnNan no Rough na Kanji de	TBS		
2010	Kakyuun!	KTV	"Samurai Project – Sports Jikken Document: Nīto Geinin, Nihon vs. Cameroon o Cameroon de Totsugeki Ōen"	
2010	Zakkuri Senshi Piramekid	TV Tokyo	As Kuroike / Shirokuro Kaijin Daradarā	
2010	Seken no Uragawa nozoki mi Variety: Ura Mayo!	KTV	Thursday MC	
2011	Ahoyanen! Sukiyanen!	NHK Osaka		
2012	Puripuri	MBS	"Odekake! Gariku Shun" reporter, regular Tuesday appearances	
2014	NMB48 Works Part-time So "Meccha"	KTV	Narration	
	Spa Sho Area	Space Shower TV	As the voice of heaven	

=== TV drama ===
Year	Title	Role	Network	Ref.
2012	Lucky Seven		Fuji TV	
2015	Prison School	Reiji "Andre" Ando	MBS	

=== Films ===
Year	Title	Role	Notes
2015	Inside Out	Train worker	Japanese dub
2017	Gintama	Redacted	Scene Redacted

=== Radio ===
Year	Title	Network	Notes	Ref.
	Ushi Bara	MBS Radio		
	Pikapika High Heel	MBS Radio		
	Radio Yoshimoto: Muccha Genki!	Radio Osaka	Thursday appearances	
	Radio Denden Town	Radio Osaka		
2016	Sumaraji W "Messenger Aihara no Yoru wa korekara!	MBS Radio		

=== Advertisements ===
Title
Tomy Aero Spider
