= Nikkan Sports Film Award for Best Newcomer =

Annual Japanese film award

- Awarded for: Best Performance by a Newcomer
- Country: Japan
- Presented by: Nikkan Sports
- First award: 1988
- Website: www.nikkansports.com/entertainment/award/ns-cinema/top-ns-cinema.html

The Nikkan Sports Film Award for Best Newcomer is an award given at the Nikkan Sports Film Award.

== List of winners ==
No.	Year	Actor(s)	Film(s)
1	1988	Kumiko Goto	Memories of You
2	1989	Rie Miyazawa	Who Do I Choose?
2	1989	Takeshi Kitano	Violent Cop
3	1990	Riho Makise	Tokyo Jōkū Irasshaimase; Tugumi
4	1991	Hikari Ishida	Chizuko's Younger Sister; Kamitsukitai
5	1992	Misa Shimizu	Okoge
6	1993	Masato Hagiwara	A Class to Remember; Kyōso Tanjō
7	1994	Kyōka Suzuki	119
8	1995	Tatsuya Ishii	Kappa
8	1995	Shunji Iwai	Love Letter
9	1996	Masanobu Andō	Kids Return
10	1997	Miki Sakai	Aisuru; Yūkai; Nagareita Shichinin
11	1998	Speed	Andromedia
12	1999	Ryōko Hirosue	Poppoya; Himitsu
13	2000	Kyoko Fukada	Shisha no Gakuensai
14	2001	Kō Shibasaki	Battle Royale; Go
15	2002	Aoi Miyazaki	Harmful Insect
16	2003	Satomi Ishihara	Watashi no Guranpa
17	2004	Masami Nagasawa	Crying Out Love in the Center of the World
18	2005	Erika Sawajiri	Break Through!
19	2006	Yū Aoi	Hula Girls
20	2007	Yui Aragaki	Waruboro; Koizora
21	2008	Kaho	Utatama; Tokyo Girl; Sand Chronicles
22	2009	Masaki Okada	I Give My First Love to You; Jūryoku Piero
23	2010	Riisa Naka	Zebraman 2: Attack on Zebra City
24	2011	Mao Inoue	Oba: The Last Samurai; Rebirth
25	2012	Emi Takei	Ai to Makoto; Rurouni Kenshin
26	2013	Haru Kuroki	Sōgen no Isu; The Great Passage
27	2014	Rena Nōnen	Hot Road
28	2015	Suzu Hirose	Our Little Sister
29	2016	Kasumi Arimura	Somebody; The Firefly Summers
30	2017	Minami Hamabe	Let Me Eat Your Pancreas; Ajin: Demi-Human
31	2018	Yurina Hirate	Hibiki
32	2019	Kaya Kiyohara	Aiuta: My Promise to Nakuhito; Day and Night; Strawberry Song
33	2020	Misaki Hattori	Midnight Swan
34	2021	Ren Komai	Ito; The Woman of S.R.I. the Movie
35	2022	Yuumi Kawai	Plan 75; A Winter Rose; A Man, and others
36	2023	Takehiko Inoue	The First Slam Dunk
37	2024	Kiara Nakanishi	My Sunshine
38	2025	Yuta Hayashi	Baka's Identity
