= Prison School =

Japanese manga series and its adaptations

- First tankōbon volume cover, featuring Kiyoshi Fujino

監獄学園(プリズンスクール) (Purizun Sukūru)
- Genre: Sex comedy
- Manga
- Written by: Akira Hiramoto
- Published by: Kodansha
- English publisher: NA: Yen Press
- Imprint: Young Magazine KC
- Magazine: Weekly Young Magazine
- Original run: February 7, 2011 – December 25, 2017
- Volumes: 28
- Anime television series
- Directed by: Tsutomu Mizushima
- Produced by: Kōhei Kawase; Takuya Matsushita; Yūji Matsukura; Nobuhiro Ōsawa
- Written by: Michiko Yokote
- Music by: Kōtarō Nakagawa
- Studio: J.C.Staff
- Licensed by: Crunchyroll
- Original network: Tokyo MX, KBS, Sun TV, TV Aichi, BS11, AT-X
- English network: US: Funimation Channel
- Original run: July 11, 2015 – September 26, 2015
- Episodes: 12 + OVA
- Television drama
- Directed by: Noboru Iguchi
- Produced by: Masahiro Kazumoto; Hiroo Maruyama; Kensuke Tateishi
- Written by: Noboru Iguchi; Ayako Kitagawa
- Music by: Yasuhiko Fukuda
- Studio: Robot
- Licensed by: Crunchyroll
- Original network: JNN (MBS, TBS)
- Original run: October 26, 2015 – December 21, 2015
- Episodes: 9
- icon

Prison School (Japanese: 監獄学園(プリズンスクール), Hepburn: Purizun Sukūru) (Note: The kanji 監獄学園 in the Japanese title, glossed with furigana as Purizun Sukūru (プリズンスクール), are normally read as Kangoku Gakuen ("prison school").) is a Japanese manga series written and illustrated by Akira Hiramoto. It was serialized in Kodansha's Weekly Young Magazine from February 2011 to December 2017. Yen Press licensed the manga for English release in North America.

Set in Nerima Ward, the story takes place in a renowned and very strict private secondary school previously reserved for women. But the establishment changes its policy and educates five young men who, by their behavior, will very quickly find themselves in quarantine. They will have to face all kinds of pitfalls to get out of this critical situation and escape the clutches of the Student Union.

A 12-episode anime television series adaptation, produced by J.C. Staff and directed by Tsutomu Mizushima, aired from July to September 2015. A live-action drama television series aired from October to December 2015.

By March 2018, the manga had over 13 million copies in circulation. In 2013, Prison School won the 37th Kodansha Manga Award in the general category.

== Plot ==
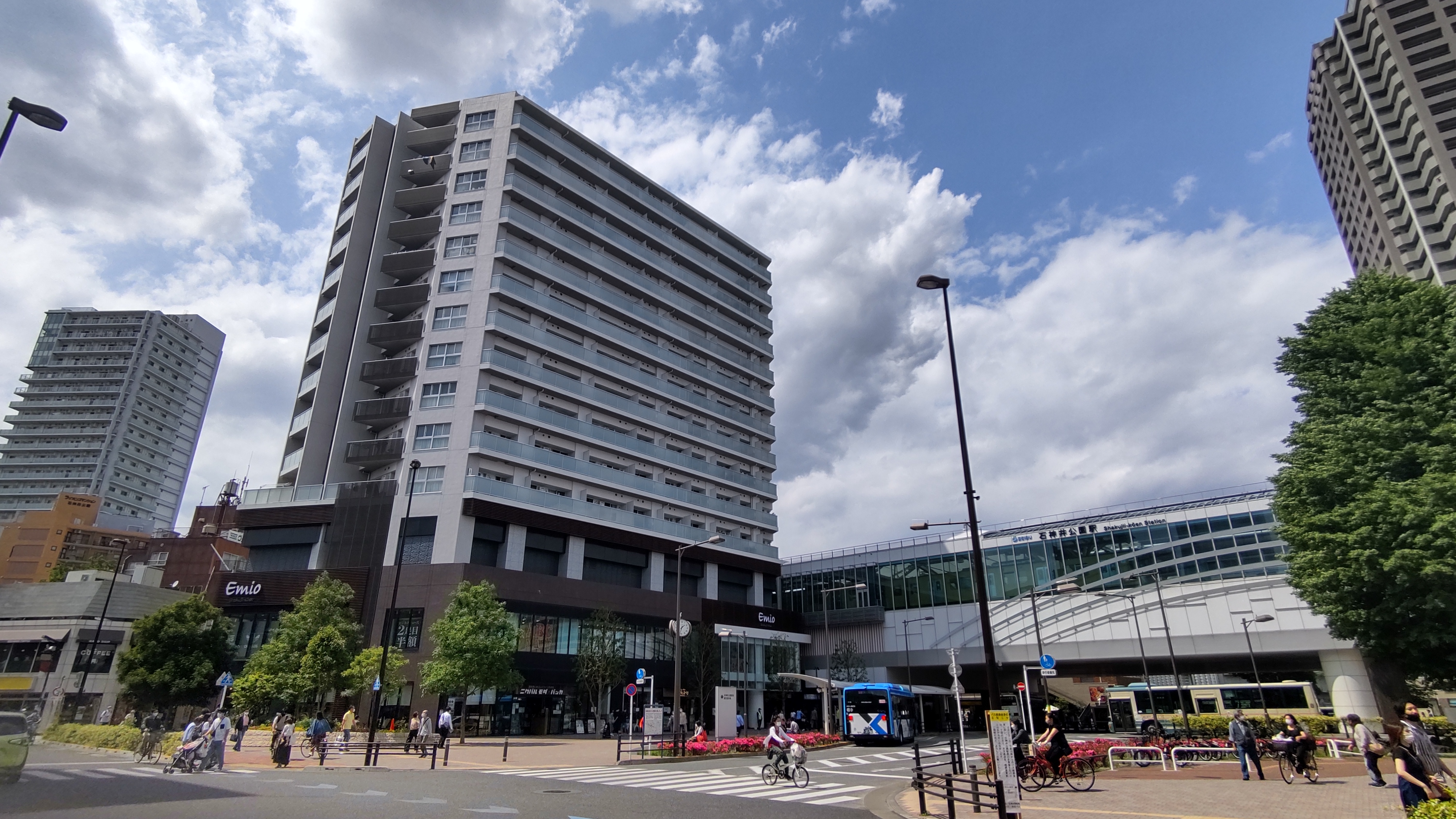
The series takes place in Nerima Ward, Tokyo Metropolis.

Hachimitsu Academy, one of the strictest girls' academies in Tokyo, was originally built in 1961 as a high-ranking sports academy and boarding school for elite young women. As the years went by, the chairman of the academy, surnamed Kurihara, has then decided to admit male students into their system. Kiyoshi Fujino is one of these new boys, but he discovers to his shock that he and his four friends—Takehito "Gakuto" Morokuzu, Shingo Wakamoto, Jouji "Joe" Nezu, and Reiji "Andre" Andou—are the only male students among 1,000 female pupils. The draconian laws that are still in place make the school even worse, which punishes even the most minor infractions with a stay in the school's prison.

In April 2011, the five young men all commit voyeurism in the school's bathing area with the lecherous philosophy of "all for one, one for all". Their capture and "arrest" by the Underground Student Council causes the five boys to receive an ultimatum: either stay a month in the school's Prison Block or be expelled. The boys are incarcerated in the Prison Block together and Kiyoshi is overwhelmed by the discovery that all the other boys are masochists that revel in the punishments handed to them by their attractive but vicious supervisors.

== Characters ==
=== Main characters ===
Kiyoshi Fujino (藤野 清志, Fujino Kiyoshi)
Voiced by: Hiroshi Kamiya (Japanese); Austin Tindle (English)
Portrayed by: Taishi Nakagawa
Kiyoshi enrolled from the same middle school as Shingo. He is the first boy in Hachimitsu Academy to make contact with a girl when he befriends Chiyo, whom he develops feelings for. Although not very bright, he often comes up with successful plans when placed under high amounts of pressure. Because of several embarrassing mishaps, he becomes the target of Hana's "affections" in prison, but he does not reciprocate them. He is the only one of the five boys to have been sent to prison more than once. When the ASC takes over during his second imprisonment, he becomes an ally to Mari, who is also a prisoner. During the Sports Festival, Hana inadvertently makes Kiyoshi the school's biggest outcast and ruins his love confession to Chiyo. Kiyoshi realizes that he never had a real chance with Chiyo because he lied to her from the moment they first met.
Takehito Morokuzu (諸葛 岳人, Morokuzu Takehito)
Voiced by: Katsuyuki Konishi (Japanese); Eric Vale (English)
Portrayed by: Tokio Emoto
Takehito, nicknamed "Gakuto", is an eccentric, glasses-wearing, nerdy student, having enrolled from the same middle school as Joe. He has a deep interest in the Three Kingdoms and speaks in an old-fashioned manner, often referring to himself in third person as "yours truly." While in prison, he is a regular target of Meiko's abuse. Despite his perverted behavior, he is shown to be an excellent strategist who employs tactics referenced from famed generals of either the Three Kingdoms or other ancient battles, a skill that has proven very useful in most of their plans. After his release from prison, most of the girls in the school treat him like an outcast. However, after the prison is destroyed, he becomes popular with the girls. His love interest is Mitsuko, who eventually rejects him out of frustration when he hesitates to choose between her and another girl.
Shingo Wakamoto (若本 真吾, Wakamoto Shingo)
Voiced by: Kenichi Suzumura (Japanese); Clifford Chapin (English)
Portrayed by: Masato Yano
Shingo is a pessimistic student who looks like a delinquent. His love interest is Anzu, and he is shown to be a strong pessimist. After Kiyoshi's breakout attempt, he completely disowns and singles him out until after the USC tricks him into breaking out. After the prison is destroyed, he, Joe, and Kiyoshi become the new outcasts of the school.
Jōji Nezu (根津 譲二, Nezu Jōji)
Voiced by: Daisuke Namikawa (Japanese); Christopher Bevins (English)
Portrayed by: Daiki Miyagi
Jōji, nicknamed "Joe", is the "misfit" of the five. He is interested in ants, usually conceals his face with a hoodie, and is very physically weak, suffering from a bloody cough caused by a non-fatal form of severe stomatitis. Joe attended the same middle school as Gakuto. His love interest is Sato. After the prison is destroyed, he, Shingo, and Kiyoshi become the new outcasts of the school.
Reiji Andō (安堂 麗治, Andō Reiji)
Voiced by: Kazuyuki Okitsu (Japanese); Sonny Strait (English)
Portrayed by: Galigali Galixon
Reiji Andō, nicknamed "Andre", is an overweight boy with an interest in extreme masochism. He is fixated on Meiko and constantly craves "punishment" from her. A twisted love triangle eventually formed between him, Meiko, and Risa. Kate took advantage of this by getting Risa to use mind control on Andre to make him join the ASC's side, giving them a massive tactical advantage in the Sports Festival competition. Andre prefers Meiko, but by the end, he realizes that he only likes her as a sadomasochist, whereas he has developed genuine feelings for Risa. Andre and Risa eventually became a couple.

=== Underground student council ===
The Underground Student Council (裏生徒会うら せいとかい, Ura Seito-Kai), short for USC, is an unsanctioned organization that enforces the traditional rules of the school code of Hachimitsu Academy. They enjoy a historically elevated status in the school, with their own designated school office and faculty influence. Though a vigilante organisation, the USC has more autonomy and student popularity in contrast to the official Student Council.

Mari Kurihara (栗原 万里, Kurihara Mari)
Voiced by: Sayaka Ohara (Japanese); Tia Ballard (English)
Portrayed by: Hirona Yamazaki
Mari is the president of the underground student council. She is the daughter of Hachimitsu Academy's chairman and the sister of Chiyo. A cold and calculating figure who seeks to uphold the school's traditions and rules. From the very beginning she immediately despises the boys, and the chairman's decision of integrating the academy. Much of this stems from her own resentment of her father's perverted behavior. In middle school, Mari helped Meiko stand up for herself when she was bullied by Kate, and the two have remained close friends ever since. She, like the rest of the Kurihara family, employs a strange philosophy to judge one's character. Her philosophy is, "Anyone who likes crows isn't all bad." After the prison is destroyed, she acknowledges that she is part of the problem. Therefore, as an act of atonement, she secretly leaves Hachimitsu Academy.
Meiko Shiraki (白木 芽衣子, Shiraki Meiko)
Voiced by: Shizuka Itō (Japanese); Whitney Rodgers (English)
Portrayed by: Asana Mamoru
Meiko is the towering bespectacled vice president of the underground student council. She is put in charge of watching over the boys while they are in prison. In middle school, she was bullied for her large breasts. The strongest student in the school, and proficient in Judo, Meiko is a harsh disciplinarian over the boys, and often punishes them for the slightest infraction, with Gakuto being a popular target. Although a powerful and intimidating figure, she deeply fears displeasing Mari, which manifests itself in body-wide excessive sweating. Similarly, she enjoys performing calisthenics, and is often seen comically performing odd exercises with a large puddle of sweat underneath her. Aside from working out, she has been shown to have a knack for cooking. Because of her voluptuous/athletic physique, her school uniform barely manages to hide her body often leading to comical wardrobe malfunctions. It is revealed that, like Kate, Meiko also had a crush on Mari. The two argue while trying and failing to catch up to her before she leaves. Meiko was last seen sitting next to Kate, looking solemn and regretful.
Hana Midorikawa (緑川 花, Midorikawa Hana)
Voiced by: Kana Hanazawa (Japanese); Alexis Tipton (English)
Portrayed by: Aoi Morikawa
Hana is the secretary of the underground student council. She mostly ends up in the worst situations with Kiyoshi, whom she eventually develops feelings for. She is also an adept martial artist, often utilizing her karate skills to brutally punish the boys if Meiko's harsh punishment does not work. Although she seems composed and competent, she is actually childish. She understands little about boys and often fails to adapt to unexpected situations. After her release from prison, she acts as Mari's spy for the Above Ground Student council. Her jealousy and inability to be honest about her feelings for Kiyoshi cause her to repeatedly torment and sexually harass him. She later tries to sabotage his love confession to Chiyo multiple times and nearly succeeds at the last moment.

=== Aboveground student council ===
The Aboveground Student Council (表おもて生せい徒と会かい, Omote Seito-Kai), short for ASC, is Hachimitsu Academy's official sanctioned student council that manages the extracurricular activities and student clubs of the school. Compared to the vigilante rival Underground Student Council, they have a low status in the school and lower popularity, with their school office in a wooden shed in the school grounds.

Kate Takenomiya (竹ノ宮 ケイト, Takenomiya Keito)
Voiced by: Ami Koshimizu (Japanese); Kristin Sutton (English)
Kate is the president of the aboveground student council and Mari's rival from middle school. She is the one who refers the USC to a prison sentence when they are found guilty of sabotaging the boys' sentence. She then continues to torment the USC once in prison. Proficient in aikido, and a master manipulator, Kate manages to turn the entire school against the USC, and quickly becomes a ruthless and persistent adversary to Mari and the boys, when the latter decides to help the USC. Mari deduces that Kate is a lesbian with a crush on her. Mari successfully seduces Kate and blackmails her with their sex tape. This made Kate hate Mari even more and become determined to destroy the USC on Sports Festival day. After the destruction of the prison, she slightly mellowed out and accompanied her "love rival," Meiko, in an attempt to catch up with Mari, who was leaving the school. She was last seen sitting solemnly and regretfully next to Meiko, both of them having failed to reach Mari.
Risa Bettō (別当 リサ, Bettō Risa)
Risa is the vice president of the aboveground student council. She is also shown to be very skilled at kendo, capable of fighting off both Meiko and Hana, as well as a proficient motorcyclist in spite of her young age and minor status. She has a strong love for Andre and employs sadistic techniques to please him. Unlike Meiko, she is not naturally inclined toward sadomasochism. Andre is touched by her care and concern, however, and they eventually become a couple.
Mitsuko Yokoyama (横山 みつ子, Yokoyama Mitsuko)
Voiced by: Mikako Takahashi
Mitsuko is the secretary of the aboveground student council and Anzu's cousin. Kiyoshi refers to her as the "'Rube Goldberg' of Klutzes" because of her clumsiness. She writes yaoi manga as a hobby. She has romantic feelings for Gakuto and is extremely clumsy. Kate takes advantage of this from time to time. She is revealed to be Kate's ultimate weapon against the USC in the Sports Festival competition. Despite their mutual attraction, Mitsuko rejects Gakuto out of annoyance when he hesitates between her and another girl.

=== Other characters ===
Chairman Kurihara (理事長, Rijichō)
Voiced by: Keiji Fujiwara (Japanese); Smokey DeLange (English)
Portrayed by: Masahiro Takashima
He is the chairman at Hachimitsu Academy and father of Mari and Chiyo. He is wealthy but perverted. He often sympathizes with the boys. He is a self-proclaimed "ass-man", keeping various photos of female posteriors in his office, even looking at them while scheduling appointments with other characters, much to his daughter Mari's disappointment. He, like the rest of the Kurihara family employs a strange philosophy to judge one's character. His philosophy is, "Anyone who likes butts isn't all bad". He ends up in jail after the school prison is destroyed. He was last seen thinking to himself that, of Mari and Chiyo, he actually considers the younger, more innocent Chiyo to be the more mature one.
Chiyo Kurihara (栗原 千代, Kurihara Chiyo)
Voiced by: Chinami Hashimoto (Japanese); Kristen McGuire (English)
Portrayed by: Rena Takeda
Chiyo is Kiyoshi's classmate and watches sumo wrestling as a hobby. Kiyoshi has a crush on her, and she has one on him. She is Mari's sister and has deep respect for her. She, like the rest of the Kurihara family employs a strange philosophy to judge one's character. Her philosophy is, "Anyone who likes sumo wrestling isn't all bad". She is overly optimistic about Kiyoshi's character, which led her to form a positive first impression of him. She believes that he did not peek at her while she was showering, even though he clearly did. She eventually succeeds Mari as president of the Underground Student Council. It is hinted that seeing her crush, Kiyoshi, wearing Hana's panties turned her into a misandrist, just like her older sister.
Anzu Yokoyama (横山 杏子, Yokoyama Anzu)
Voiced by: Yō Taichi (Japanese); Colleen Clinkenbeard (English)
Portrayed by: Yuko Araki
Anzu is a former spy for the Underground Student Council and Mitsuko's cousin. She has romantic feelings for Shingo, and is a year older than him. One of her recurring visual gags is her constant nipple slips, which the boys notice but she does not.
Satō (佐藤)
Voiced by: Nana Hamasaki
A student at Hachimitsu Academy. She unwittingly prevents Joe from being imprisoned again when she offers him a cupcake, and he quickly develops a crush on her. Eventually, she and her friends, Mayumi, Anzu, and Chiyo, join forces with the USC against the ASC.
Mayumi Tanaka (田中 マユミ, Tanaka Mayumi)
Voiced by: Ami Nanase (Japanese); Lara Woodhull (English)
Portrayed by: Yufu Terashima
Chiyo's best friend. She is often seen with Chiyo and helps her warn the boys about their impending expulsion. Together with Anzu, Sato, and Chiyo, she allies with the USC against the ASC. As a distraction, the ASC exposes Mayumi's double life in front of the entire school. They reveal that she is a social media influencer who relies on sex appeal to attract male attention. The public shaming pushes Mayumi over the edge. As a result, Andre, who is mind-controlled, easily knocks her team out of the competition.

== Media ==
=== Manga ===
Prison School, written and illustrated by Akira Hiramoto, was serialized in Kodansha's seinen manga magazine Weekly Young Magazine from February 7, 2011, to December 25, 2017. Kodansha collected its chapters in twenty-eight tankōbon volumes, released from June 6, 2011, to April 6, 2018.

In North America, the manga was licensed for English release by Yen Press. They published the series in fourteen omnibus volumes, containing two original tankōbon volumes each, from July 21, 2015, to October 29, 2019.

=== Anime ===
An anime television series adaptation was announced in August 2014. The series was produced by Genco, Egg Firm, Warner Bros. Japan, Kodansha, Showgate, Klockworx, Movic, and J.C. Staff. It was directed by Tsutomu Mizushima, with Michiko Yokote handling series composition and writing the scripts, Junichirō Taniguchi designing the characters and props and Kōtarō Nakagawa composing the music. The anime aired on Tokyo MX, KBS, Sun TV, TV Aichi and BS11 from July to September 2015. The voice actors of the five male main characters performed the opening and ending theme songs under the group name Kangoku Danshi.

An original animation DVD was bundled with the limited edition 20th volume of the manga that was released on March 4, 2016. The OAD adapted the manga's Mad Wax story arc. Following Sony's acquisition of Crunchyroll, the series was moved to Crunchyroll.

==== Episodes ====
No.	Title	Directed by	Original release date
1	"The Peep Job"; Transliteration: "Nozoki daisakusen" (Japanese: ノゾキ大作戦)	Tsutomu Mizushima	July 11, 2015
Five best friends, Kiyoshi Fujino, Takehito "Gakuto" Morokuzu, Shingo Wakamoto, Jouji "Joe" Nezu, and Reiji "Andre" Andou, are the only boys enrolled in the formerly all-girl Hachimitsu Academy. Kiyoshi becomes the first boy to talk to a girl when he encounters Chiyo Kurihara, an avid sumo fan, and they agree to attend a sumo tournament together. The boys formulate a plan to video girls in their bathhouse, but Kiyoshi drops his phone and has to climb in to retrieve it. Meanwhile, the Underground Student Council (USC) catches the other boys, and later Kiyoshi is caught by their President, Mari Kurihara. As punishment, they are sentenced to one month in the school's prison, where they suffer constant abuse by the Vice-President Meiko Shiraki. Meiko later enlists the help of Hana Midorikawa, the USC's Secretary, to oversee the boys. When Kiyoshi returns a baby crow to its nest, he falls from the branch and witnesses Hana urinating on the grass, much to her embarrassment.
2	"The Man Who Viewed Too Much"; Transliteration: "Shirisugiteita otoko" (Japanese: 尻すぎていた男)	Daisuke Takashima	July 18, 2015
Mari's father, the school's Chairman, suggests the girls are being unfair and so Mari allows the boys to have up to three hours of free time on the weekends, inspiring them to become model prisoners. Later, as Mari drops off the new USC guidebook at the Chairman's office, she sees a pornographic image on his computer and decides to punish the boys by removing their free time. Kiyoshi formulates a plan to break out by making a hole in a wall behind a refuse shed. When Hana insists that Kiyoshi pees in front of her in return for him seeing her pee, he is rescued by Gakuto. Gakuto catches on to Kiyoshi's plan and offers to help him break out in return for him buying the Three Kingdoms figures, Guan Yu and Red Hare, which are available only once every four years. The next day, Gakuto and Kiyoshi fake a fight to trick Hana into kicking down the shed which hides the hole. Gakuto tries to distract Hana so Kiyoshi can use the bathroom alone, but Hana corners him inside a stall and again insists that he pee in front of her. However, he accidentally pees all over her causing her to scream loudly and then Meiko arrives to see Hana's embarrassing condition, while Kiyoshi has already escaped from there before she arrived.
3	"Effusion Plan"; Transliteration: "Daifunshutsu" (Japanese: 大噴出)	Hideaki Kurakawa	July 25, 2015
Following the urination incident, Hana is removed from her position, leaving Meiko to monitor the boys. Kiyoshi tries a test run through the hole, and on his way back he sees the Chairman burying his nude picture collection. In preparation for a school track meet, Kiyoshi, Gakuto, and Shingo are assigned to watch student belongings, but Shingo goes off with Andre and Joe. Shingo has becomes suspicious of Kiyoshi and Gakuto spending so much time together and when he witnesses them taking a shower together he jumps to the wrong conclusion. Another test run of the escape route results in Meiko stepping on Kiyoshi's butt, causing it to bleed which Shingo mistakenly exclaims is due to hemorrhoids. During an IT class, Gakuto plans to download defecation noises onto his audio player to replay when Kiyoshi is off site to pretend he is using the bathroom. However, when he cannot find any sounds online, he decides to record his own by defecating in the classroom. Unfortunately, they later find out the hole has been patched up – done by the Chairman re-burying his photos with cement on top. Kiyoshi devises another plan to sneak out by dressing as a female student and Gakuto aids him once more by intentionally stripping down Mari's skirt to incur punishment.
4	"Take Me Out to the Sumoland"; Transliteration: "Watashi o sumō ni tsuretette" (Japanese: 私をスモーに連れてって)	Atsushi Kobayashi	August 1, 2015
As punishment for pulling down Mari's skirt, Meiko shaves off Gakuto's hair. However, Gakuto's real intention of having his head shaved was to provide hair for Kiyoshi to use as a makeshift wig to sneak out of school. Kiyoshi manages to steal a uniform from the school's laundry room while Gakuto distracts the laundry man. On the day of the track meet, Kiyoshi places speakers with the pooping audio inside the bathroom and sneaks out though the drainage pipe, narrowly avoiding Meiko and Mari. However, Kiyoshi's date is cut short when Chiyo leaves in disgust after she sees Gakuto's hair and the uniform with her name on its label inside his bag. Back at school, Meiko becomes fed up with Kiyoshi's prolonged bathroom trip and she decides to confront him personally. Gakuto watches nervously as Meiko kicks down the stall door.
5	"The School's Number One Most Treacherous Man"; Transliteration: "Gakuen ichi no uragiri otoko" (Japanese: 学園一の裏切り男)	Naoki Murata	August 8, 2015
When Meiko kicks down the stall door, she finds Kiyoshi weeping on the toilet although he had managed to obtain the figures and return in time, much to Gakuto's delight. However as they leave the bathroom, Mari appears and when Meiko examines Kiyoshi's bag she finds Gakuto's hair and Chiyo's uniform. Mari's suspicions of a breakout are confirmed and Kiyoshi is thrown into solitary confinement. Kiyoshi claims he acted alone, so his friends are punished with a one-month extension of their sentence and he is set to be expelled. Meiko says they do not have the authorization to carry out that punishment so Mari pressures Kiyoshi to sign a school withdrawal request form. Chiyo arrives and threatens to sign a form as well if Mari forces Kiyoshi signed a form, so he refuses to sign. Returned to prison, Kiyoshi finds that Shingo is encouraging Joe, Andre and a reluctant Gakuto to distance themselves from him. Meanwhile, Mari figures that if the boys attempt three breakouts they will be expelled so she plans to implements a Danshi Taigaku Operation, (Note: Translated as Boys Expulsion Operation, but renamed Destroy Testicles Operation in the English dub.) or DTO. Hana meets with Mari and Meiko to put DTO into effect and promises Kiyoshi that she will take her revenge on him.
6	"Vengeance Is Hana's"; Transliteration: "Fukushūsuru wa Hana ni Ari" (Japanese: 復讐するは花にあり)	Daisuke Takashima	August 15, 2015
Meiko convinces Shingo to becomes an informant for the USC in exchange for above-average food. For example, after Andre knocks down Joe's ant farm by accident, Shingo relays this information to Meiko. During lunch break, Shingo lures Joe away from his ants, and Mari's crows apparently attacks them. When Joe sees this, he attempts to stab Mari with a sharp stick but Kiyoshi intercepts him, resulting in being impaled in the butt. When Joe is thrown in solitary confinement, Kiyoshi goes to the nurse's office. Hana appears and hands him a male urine bottle to urinate inside, but when he resists, she prepares to urinate on him. Chiyo walks in, so Hana and Kiyoshi hide under the bed, but with their lower halves exposed, Kiyoshi develops an erection causing Hana to faint. Later, Hana seems to have no recollection of the events under the bed. After a work break, Kiyoshi and Joe make amends. Meanwhile, Meiko tells Shingo that she will allow him free time outside the school.
7	"Meikotouille"; Transliteration: "Meiko no oishī resutoran" (Japanese: 芽衣子のおいしいレストラン)	Toshikazu Hashimoto	August 22, 2015
On a day out, Shingo visits a local arcade and meets Anzu, another student from Hachimitsu. On returning to the prison, Shingo notices a tiny toy sword in the bathroom and gives it to Meiko, not knowing it is a part of the Gakuto's Guan Yu figure. Later, Meiko discovers Gakuto's figure in the bathroom and threatens to crush it before his eyes unless he confesses to aiding Kiyoshi's escape or she will have everyone's sentences extended again. Much to everyone's surprise Gakuto throws the figure on the ground and breaks it. Gakuto confesses their breakout plan to the other boys and Shingo is shocked at the other boys' forgiveness. Later, Meiko reveals the sword to Mari in a serve of peanuts, but when Mari learns that it came from a bathroom floor, she forces Meiko to wear a uniform that is too small and she becomes faint. Concerned for Meiko's wellbeing, Chiyo takes her to Mari's office, where she discovers the existence of the DTO plot. Eavesdropping outside the door, Chiyo hears Mari announces the final phase of DTO is to take advantage of Andre's masochistic urges.
8	"The Diary of Andre"; Transliteration: "Andore no Nikki" (Japanese: アンドレの日記)	Masahiro Shinohara; Shinano Suzuki	August 29, 2015
Exploiting Andre's desire for punishment revealed in his "slave diary", Meiko ignores him for days. Meanwhile, Meiko gives Shingo more free time outside, warning that his failure to return by 6:30 pm would result in declaration of a breakout. The other boys are assigned to fixing the school gate, and while on their way Chiyo indicates to Kiyoshi via a go move that the USC plan to kick them out. Later, Meiko's voice calls out "punishment time" to Andre, leading him to find his diary in the Corrections Office. In a desperate bid to receive punishment, he breaks through the fence and is subdued by Hana who declares it a prison break. On their date, Anzu is impressed by Shingo's loyalty and reveals that her meetings with him were part of the DTO plan. Shingo arrives back before 6:30 but cannot open the locked gate which the other boys had repaired, meaning that three breakouts have now been committed. The boys are called before the Chairman who announces their expulsion in two weeks time even with Chiyo's intervention on their behalf. While the boys are discussing the need to find a copy of the DTO to expose the USC's hidden agenda, Shingo mentions he saw a copy somewhere.
9	"Blazing Fluids"; Transliteration: "Taieki ga ippai" (Japanese: 体液がいっぱい)	Hodaka Kuramoto	September 5, 2015
Shingo recalls seeing an email labeled "DTO" in the Corrections Office and Gakuto suggests that the email may still be recovered through a data restoration software. In a plan to take Meiko's keys so they can access the Corrections Office, the boys goad her into an arm wrestling match. Gakuto loses first, grabs her keys and manages to sneak into the office, estimating that he needs at least ten minutes to download the software and find the email. Kiyoshi, Shingo, and Joe's matches barely last a minute each, but Andre holds out the longest, losing his match with a minute to go. Gakuto just manages to return before Meiko discovers her keys are missing. While the others praise him, Gakuto is frustrated at only having had enough time to downloaded the software. Facing imminent expulsion, Kiyoshi and the others console each other before heading off to sleep.
10	"It's a Bum-derful Life!"; Transliteration: "Subarashiki shiri kana, jinsei!" (Japanese: 素晴らしき尻哉人生！)	Daisuke Takashima	September 12, 2015
Kiyoshi and the others have lost hope, except for Gakuto who begins acting irrationally. Meiko allows the boys to choose their last meal, and Chiyo manages to slip in a note to Kiyoshi in the food. Gakuto's fried grasshoppers and rice dish proves so disgusting that he breaks free of his irregular state. Kiyoshi suggests they write an appeal to the Chairman for leniency, but after Meiko sees that Gakuto did not eat the grasshoppers she spent so much time catching, she rips up the appeal. However, the appeal was a decoy because Kiyoshi wrote on his form that he knows of the Chairman's buried nude photos. Consequently, the Chairman offers to postpone the expulsion date only if the boys' preference for "boobs or butts" align with his. Meanwhile, Hana's repressed memories of Kiyoshi's erection touching her under the hospital bed surface. She goes berserk, wanting to kill Kiyoshi but Meiko manages to subdue her. Kiyoshi's convincing reply to the Chairman's question gives the boys a one-day reprieve. As the USC plans their next move, Hana eagerly offers to watch over the boys on their final day.
11	"Eringy Brockovich"; Transliteration: "Eringi Burokobicchi" (Japanese: エリンギ・ブロコビッチ)	Katsushi Sakurabi	September 19, 2015
Gakuto's plan to distract Meiko falls apart when Hana arrives instead with their lunch, including phallic eryngii mushrooms for Kiyoshi. Kiyoshi exploits Hana's grudge against him and offers to sneak inside the Corrections Office. As Chiyo intercepts another of Kiyoshi's message inside his lunch tray, she gets caught by Anzu, who also wishes to help the boys. Later, Gakuto and Kiyoshi deliberately stage a fight so Gakuto is injured and Hana takes him along with to Kiyoshi be bandaged in the Corrections Office. Hana gets Kiyoshi alone and gives him a plastic bottle so she can watch him pee into it. Full of confidence, Kiyoshi strips down, but he drops to the ground after being kneed in the groin by Hana. As she prepares to pee on him, she is interrupted by Meiko who has apprehended Anzu outside. This is a relief to the boys because it means that Chiyo is still free. Suddenly, Hana kisses Kiyoshi, stating that stealing his first kiss from Chiyo is her revenge against him.
12	"Good Morning, Prison!"; Transliteration: "Guddo mōningu purizun!" (Japanese: グッドモーニング プリズン!)	Tsutomu Mizushima	September 26, 2015
Chiyo waits for Kiyoshi to unlock the back door of the Corrections Office where he and Hana's confrontation is taking place. As Hana goes in for another kiss, Kiyoshi counterattacks by sticking his tongue inside Hana's mouth, completely shocking the inexperienced Hana and giving her a profuse nosebleed. Distracted, Hana returns Kiyoshi to the prison, locks the boys in and heads off to bed. The next day, Meiko takes the boys to the Chairman's office and but they are interrupted by news that Gakuto has run amok inside the school and the girls are beating him up. Meiko then discovers that Joe is dressed as Gakuto and Chiyo is disguised as Joe under his hoodie. The boys explain that while Hana returned Kiyoshi to prison, Chiyo sneaked in the back door of the Corrections Office and performed a three-way clothing exchange with Gakuto and Joe. She spent the night in prison with the boys while Gakuto retrieved the DTO email. As Gakuto passes a USB flash drive to the Chairman with the DTO information, Hana discovers Kiyoshi's manipulation and proceeds to punch him, only to punch Mari instead who confesses to the DTO plan. After the Chairman sees the data, he declares that the boys have served their time and are now free. In a post-credits scene, the boys are quite content with their school lives while the USC are stripped of their uniforms by the Aboveground Student Council (ASC) and led past the other students into the school prison.
OVA	"Mad Wax"; Transliteration: "Maddo wakkusu" (Japanese: マッドワックス)	Shinano Suzuki	March 4, 2016
Mari, Meiko and Hana of the USC are led to their cells by the ASC. President Kate Takenomiya orders them to strip and put on their prison uniforms which results in a defiant but a brief scuffle with ASC Vice-President Risa Betto. The boys adjust to life at a school full of girls and initially find it difficult to adjust, each finding their own way of coping and interacting with girls. However, Joe is uncomfortable with girls and life outside the prison. He laments to Andre about his failure to find a girl and how life in prison seemed better. When Andre finds his bondage rope is missing he realizes that Joe has used it to bind himself and plans on exposing his bound naked body to the girls in an attempt to be returned to prison. Andre rushes towards the pool locker room to stop Joe from exposing himself. Meanwhile, Joe is offered a cupcake by Sato, Joe's first girl interaction and he hesitates. Just then, after a series of mishaps, Andre slides past Joe into the locker room, naked and tied up with bondage rope. Kiyoshi and the others rush to the scene and watch as Andre receives a severe beating from the locker room girls, but with a smile on his face.

=== TV drama ===
A live-action television drama adaptation was announced in August 2015, directed by Noboru Iguchi at production studio Robot. The series premiered on October 26, 2015; (Note: The series is listed to air on October 25 at 24:50; this is the equivalent of 12:50 a.m. on October 26.) and aired on MBS and TBS. The opening theme song is "Shōdō" (衝動; "Urge") performed by HaKU.

== Reception ==
By March 2018, the manga had over 13 million copies in circulation.

Prison School was one of two winners of the Best General Manga award, alongside Gurazeni at the 37th Kodansha Manga Award in 2013. The broadcast dub version of the anime was criticized for altering the original meaning of a line while referencing the Gamergate controversy, written by Tyson Rinehart.
