= Sekigahara (film) =

- Theatrical release poster
- Directed by: Masato Harada
- Screenplay by: Masato Harada
- Based on: Sekigahara by Ryōtarō Shiba
- Produced by: Akira Yamamoto
- Starring: Junichi Okada; Kasumi Arimura; Takehiro Hira; Masahiro Higashide; Kōji Yakusho
- Narrated by: Katsumi Kiba
- Cinematography: Takahide Shibanushi
- Edited by: Eugene Harada
- Music by: Harumi Fuuki
- Distributed by: Toho; Asmik Ace
- Release date: August 26, 2017 (Japan)
- Running time: 150 minutes
- Country: Japan
- Language: Japanese
- Box office: ¥2.4 billion

Sekigahara (Japanese: 関ヶ原) is a 2017 jidaigeki Japanese film directed by Masato Harada starring Junichi Okada as Ishida Mitsunari. The film recounts the Battle of Sekigahara, a six-hour battle in 1600 that brought an end to the Warring States era in Japanese history, as well as the political struggles that led up to it. It is an adaptation of the 1966 novel Sekigahara by Ryōtarō Shiba.

== Plot ==
In 1570, Toyotomi Hideyoshi meets a young temple acolyte, "Sakichi", and recruits him into his service after being impressed with his impertinence. Sakichi grows up and eventually renames himself Ishida Mitsunari, gaining wealth, lands and prestige in his new master's service. Hideyoshi unifies most of Japan and takes the title of taikō, but also grows erratic in his old age: He orders a series of expensive invasions of Korea to expand his holdings but his armies are defeated and most of his vassals are almost bankrupted. In 1595, after he fathers a son, Hideyori, following years of being unable to conceive, Toyotomi orders the execution of his previously appointed heir and his entire family, under the pretext of treason, so his biological son can be his new heir. Dismayed at this unjust act, Mitsunari pleads for mercy, but fails to move Hideyoshi's heart.

After the maids of one of the condemned women interrupt the execution, Mitsunari is impressed by their loyalty to their lady and spares them, even recruiting one, a woman called Hatsume, to serve him as a spy. Mitsunari also meets Shima Sakon, a ronin who had caused a disturbance prior to the beheadings and who was once an incredibly respected general. Mitsunari offers Sakon half of his earnings if he'll serve him as a samurai, but Sakon initially turns him down, since he loathes Mitsunari's master. Ultimately Mitsunari convinces him by pledging that, after Hideyoshi's death, he'll help his son govern the country more fairly than his father.

Intrigues continue at court as Hideyoshi grows ill and weak. Mitsunari and his longtime friend, Otani Yoshitsugu, correctly suspect that Tokugawa Ieyasu, the wealthiest lord in the country, will conspire to usurp control away from the Toyotomi Clan after Hideyoshi's death. Simulatenously, Tokugawa starts conspiring to rise against Mitsunari after Hideyoshi's death, since he suspects he'll try to take control of the Regency Council that will govern until young Hideyori comes of age. After Toyotomi vassal Kobayakawa Hideaki is demoted and has most of his lands confiscated by Hideyoshi for poor conduct in Korea; Tokugawa convinces him that Mitsunari has been turning Hideyoshi against him. Using bribes and espionage, Hatsume tries to keep Mitsunari informed of Tokugawa's actions, but she is hindered by Tokugawa's spymaster, the White Snake.

In 1598, Hideyoshi succumbs to his illness and Mitsunari orders that his death be covered up until all troops return from Korea, in order to avoid chaos during the retreat. When news of Toyotomi's death is made public and this ruse is revealed, Tokugawa takes it as further proof that Mitsunari intends to take control of the Regency Council. Just as conflict appears inevitable, a temporary truce is established due to the intervention of Maeda Toshiie, a respected lord who is friends with both Tokugawa and Mitsunari. The truce lasts until Maeda dies the following year, after which Tokugawa's allies plot to assassinate Mitsunari, who is forced to flee back to his castle in Sawayama. Before departing, he professes his love for Hatsume, telling her that he cannot be with her because he is already married, but that she is nonetheless the person he loves most. However, after a mission to secretly deliver messages to a severely-ill Otani, Hatsume is ambushed and captured on the road by thugs sent by the White Snake, who then sells her into slavery.

Mitsunari forges an alliance with Tokugawa's old rival, Uesugi Kagekatsu, and both rise against him. Mitsunari's forces try to take hostages out of the families of lords living in Osaka, but one such attempted hostage-taking ends in the entire Hosokawa family killing themselves and setting fire to their home. Guilt-ridden, Mitsunari orders that no more hostages be taken and mobilizes his army, joined by Otani, Sakon and Kobayakawa, the latter of whom is a double agent for Tokugawa. Elsewhere, Hatsume escapes from her captors and begins to travel toward Sekigahara, anticipating Mitsunari and Tokugawa's armies will meet there.

On October 21, 1600, battle commences in Sekigahara. Sakon leads a small elite force against the Tokugawa vanguard; driving them back but getting shot in the process, which forces him to cede command. One of Mitsunari's ninja attempts to assassinate Tokugawa at his camp, but he is stopped by the White Snake and both die fighting each other. As the battle is in the balance, a hesitant Kobayakawa is pressured by Tokugawa's emissaries into going through with his pre-planned betrayal of Mitsunari. After the order is given, Kobayakawa tries to rescind it, but Tokugawa's emissary stops him. Kobayakawa's troops turn against Mitsunari's and make a surprise attack against Otani's camp, killing him. The resulting panic sparks chaos in Mitsunari's army and allows the Tokugawa forces to break their lines and rout them, winning the battle. Mitsunari declines to commit suicide and instead flees after ensuring that Sakon and the other wounded can retreat.

Mitsunari spends some time in hiding before eventually surrendering to Tokugawa's troops. While imprisoned, he is visited by a grief-stricken Kobayakawa, who regrets having turned on him. Mitsunari forgives him and tells him to go along with Tokugawa now, since it is too late to save him. The day prior to Mitsunari's execution, Tokugawa meets with him but neither man says anything to the other. En route to the site of his execution, Mitsunari sees Hatsume, who has finally found him once more. As he and his captors pass her, she mouthes the motto of his clan to him: "If one gives oneself for all, the world will prosper".

== Cast ==
The Western Army

- Junichi Okada as Ishida Mitsunari
- Kasumi Arimura as Hatsume
- Takehiro Hira as Shima Sakon
- Noriko Nakagoshi as Hanano, the wife of Sakon
- Masahiro Higashide as Kobayakawa Hideaki
- Yasumasa Ōba as Ōtani Yoshitsugu
- Akaji Maro as Shimazu Yoshihiro
- Masaki Miura as Shimazu Toyohisa
- Sho Ikushima as Ukita Hideie
- Ikuji Nakamura as Mashita Nagamori
- Yoshiaki Tsujimoto as Uesugi Kagekatsu
- Kenichi Matsuyama as Naoe Kanetsugu
- Mitsu Dan as Myozen
- Keisuke Horibe as Yasojima Sukezaemon
- Ken Yamamura as Shima Nobukatsu
- Seisuke Yamasaki as Mōri Terumoto
- Shihō Harumi as Ankokuji Ekei

The Eastern Army

- Kōji Yakusho as Tokugawa Ieyasu
- Ayumi Ito as Hebishiro/Lady Acha
- Yukiya Kitamura as Ii Naomasa
- Masato Wada as Kuroda Nagamasa
- Takuma Otoo as Fukushima Masanori
- Yōhei Matsukado as Katō Kiyomasa
- Chukichi Kubo as Honda Masanobu
- Daisuke Amano as Honda Tadakatsu
- Haruo Sekiguchi as Hosokawa Tadaoki
- Kaito Yoshimura as Matsudaira Tadayoshi
- Masakazu Saiga as Ikeda Terumasa
- Kazunaga Tsuji as Yagyū Munetoshi
- Tasuku Nagaoka as Yagyū Munenori
- Shu Nakajima as Akamimi, an Iga ninja

Others

- Kenichi Takitō as Toyotomi Hideyoshi
- Midoriko Kimura as Kita no mandokoro
- Tokuma Nishioka as Maeda Toshiie
- Nana Wada as Yodo-dono
- Juri Yamamoto as Komahime
- Katsumi Kiba as the author/narrator

== Reception ==
Mark Schilling of The Japan Times awarded the film three stars out of five, finding it alternately exhilarating and confusing. Of the early parts of the film, he wrote "the film buries the uninitiated in a blizzard of information about the era's politics and personalities, cutting rapidly from scene to scene at a pace meant to be dazzling, but often ends up dizzying" and found the battle sequence "no doubt faithful to the real thing, but somewhat baffling to watch."

The film made ¥2.4 billion (approximately 21.7 million US dollars) in the 2017 Japanese box office.

== Awards ==
Award ceremony	Category	Nominee	Result
42nd Hochi Film Award	Best Supporting Actor	Kōji Yakusho	Won
30th Nikkan Sports Film Award	Best Supporting Actor	Kōji Yakusho	Won
41st Japan Academy Prize	Picture of the Year	Sekigahara	Nominated
41st Japan Academy Prize	Director of the Year	Masato Harada	Nominated
41st Japan Academy Prize	Best Film Editing	Masato Harada	Nominated
41st Japan Academy Prize	Best Actor	Junichi Okada	Nominated
41st Japan Academy Prize	Best Supporting Actor	Kōji Yakusho	Nominated
41st Japan Academy Prize	Best Music	Harumi Fūki	Nominated
41st Japan Academy Prize	Best Cinematography	Takahide Shibanushi	Won
41st Japan Academy Prize	Best Lighting Direction	Takaaki Miyanishi	Won
41st Japan Academy Prize	Best Art Direction	Tetsuo Harada	Nominated
41st Japan Academy Prize	Best Sound Recording	Masato Yano	Won
