= Kasumi Arimura =

Japanese actress (born 1993)

- 有村 架純
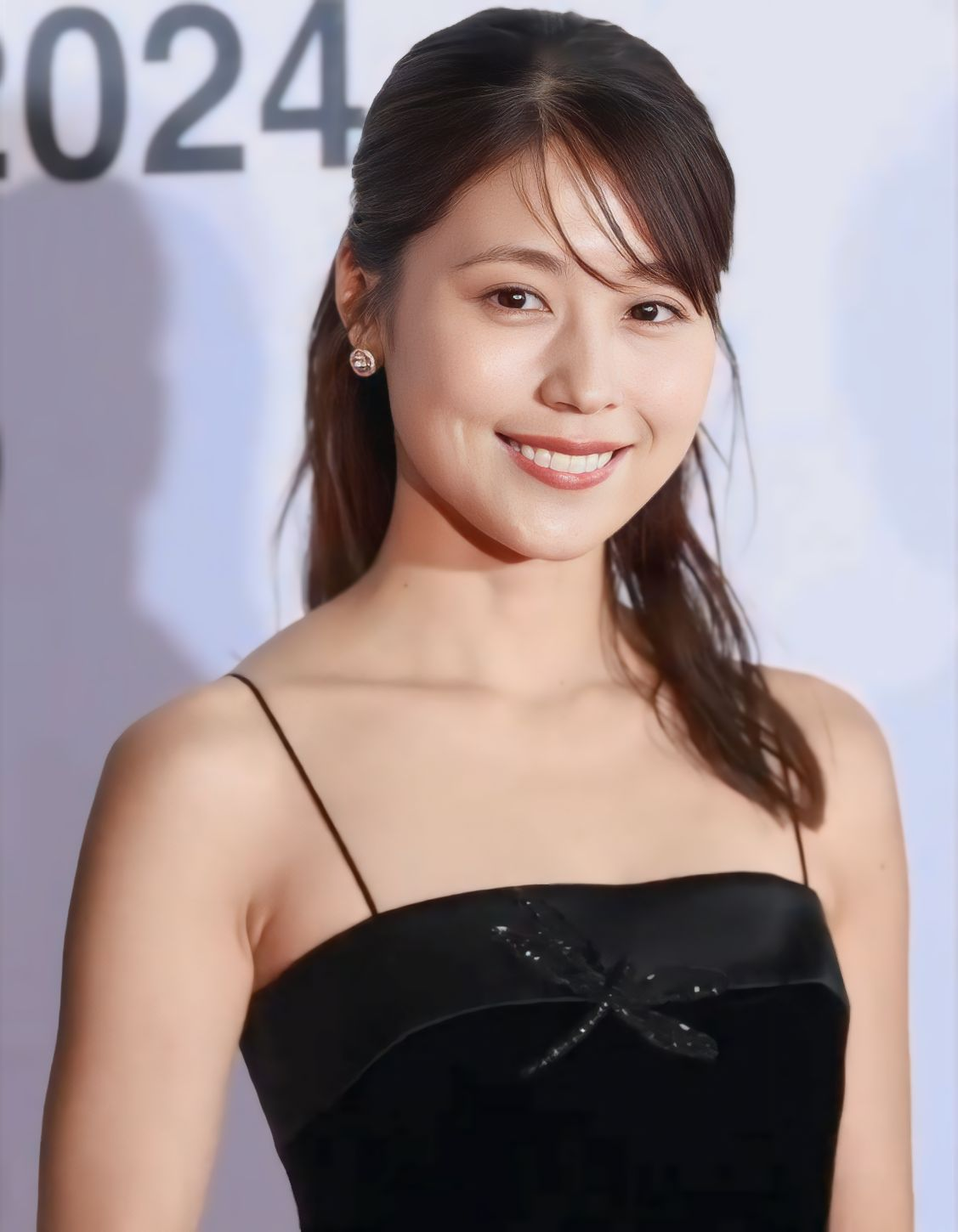
- Arimura at the 2024 Busan International Film Festival
- Born: February 13, 1993 (age 33); Itami, Hyōgo, Japan
- Occupation: Actress
- Years active: 2010–present
- Agent: FLaMme
- Known for: Amachan; Hiyokko; Strobe Edge; Flying Colors

Kasumi Arimura (有村 架純, Arimura Kasumi; born February 13, 1993), is a Japanese actress. Her television roles have included the young Haruko Amano in the 2013 NHK asadora Amachan and the lead role in the 2017 asadora Hiyokko. She has also appeared in several films, including Flying Colors, for which she won a 39th Japan Academy Film Prize for Newcomer of the Year, and We Made A Beautiful Bouquet, for which she won the 45th Japan Academy Film Prize for Best Actress.

== Early life ==
Arimura was born on February 13, 1993, in Itami city, Hyōgo Prefecture, Japan. She has an older sister, Airi Arimura, who is a model turned actress.

== Career ==
In December 2009, while attending Hyogo Prefectural Itami Nishi High School, Arimura auditioned for FLaMme and passed. In May 2010, she made her first series appearance in Hagane no Onna. Arimura gained popularity by appearing in the morning drama Amachan in 2013. Arimura then appeared as the lead actress in the critically acclaimed film Flying Colors where she was cast as a troubled teen who attends a cram school at the behest of her mother in order to gain entry to University. The film was a massive box office success and was the 8th highest-grossing film in Japan in 2015. Arimura was nominated for both the Outstanding Performance By An Actress In A Leading Role and Newcomer of the Year Awards in the 39th Japan Academy Film Prize for her role in the film. She was awarded the Newcomer of the Year Award.

Arimura was selected as the lead actress for the Asadora Hiyokko in the year 2017. For her role in the drama, she was voted as the Best Actress in The 94th Television Drama Academy Awards (2017), an award given quarterly by a popular Japanese magazine, The Television, and are based on the combined results of votes from the magazine readers, juries, and TV journalists in Japan. She has since appeared in many critically acclaimed television dramas and films such as Meet Me After School, I Am a Hero, Cafe Funiculi Funicula and Sekigahara. In the film Sekigahara, Arimura played the role of a ninja named Hatsume who was recruited by the legendary samurai Ishida Mitsunari. The film was nominated for the Picture of the Year award at the 41st Japan Academy Film Prize.

Arimura has also taken on acting roles in works which are regarded as controversial in nature. In the drama Meet Me After School, Arimura took on the challenging role of a young teacher who ended up falling in love with her 15 year-old student. Despite its controversial nature, the drama was named the Best Drama in the 99th Japan Television Drama Academy Awards.

The year 2021 proved to be a very successful year for Arimura. She appeared in the film We Made A Beautiful Bouquet, which was the 8th highest grossing film of 2021 in Japan. Arimura was awarded the Best Actress award in the 45th Japan Academy Film Prize for her role in the film. Arimura also starred in the blockbuster films Rurouni Kenshin: The Final and Rurouni Kenshin: The Beginning, the final 2 films of the epic Rurouni Kenshin film franchise which consist of films which are adapted from the Rurouni Kenshin manga series. Both films were massive box-office successes in 2021 in Japan, grossing more than 6.5 billion yen cumulatively. Arimura portrayed Yukishiro Tomoe, the deceased-wife of the titular character Himura Kenshin. Rurouni Kenshin: The Final was the 6th highest grossing film whilst Rurouni Kenshin: The Beginning was the 13th highest grossing film for the year 2021 in Japan.

On the drama side, Arimura starred as a young lady struggling with employment, who happens to chance upon a group of also struggling stand-up comedians in the 2021 slice of life drama Life's Punchline (Konto Ga Hajimaru). For her role in the drama, she was voted as the Best Supporting Actress in The 108th Television Drama Academy Awards, making her one of the few female actresses who has won both the Best Actress (Hiyokko) and Best Supporting Actress Awards (Life's Punchline) in The Television Drama Academy Awards.

Arimura appeared in the drama Zenkamono (a.k.a. Prior Convictions) wherein she acted as a voluntary probation officer who was tasked with the supervision of 3 separate paroled convicts. A movie version of Zenkamono starring Arimura was also released in 2022. Also In 2022, Arimura appeared alongside Ninomiya Kazunari in the TV Special Adventure of Comandante Cappellini (Sensuikan Cappellini-go no Bouken) and starred in the drama Ishiko and Haneo. Arimura appeared in the film Phases of the Moon in December 2022.

In January 2023, Arimura appeared in the 62nd NHK taiga drama What Will You Do, Ieyasu?. In February, Kasumi starred in the Netflix-produced film titled Call Me Chihiro.

In June 2024, Arimura appeared in the film Dear Family as a supporting character.

In July 2024, Kasumi starred alongside Ren Meguro in the drama Where Does The Sea Begin.

In November 2024, Kasumi appeared in the Netflix-produced drama titled Beyond Goodbye. Beyond Goodbye was ranked the 9th most-watched non-english TV series on Netflix on its first week of airing.

== Filmography ==
=== Film ===
Date	Movie	Role	Notes	Ref.
2011	Hankyu Railways - A 15-Minute Miracle	Etsuko Kadota		
2011	Samurai Angel Wars	Asami Ōta	Lead role	
2012	SPEC: Ten	Miyabi Masaki		
2013	SPEC: Close	Miyabi Masaki		
2013	The Little Maestro	Misaki Yoshikawa	Lead role	
2013	Kid's Police	High school girl		
2013	Judge	Lion		
2014	Jossy's	Kanoko Midoriyama		
2014	When Marnie Was There	Marnie (voice)	Lead role	
2014	Light Along	Saki	Lead role; short film	
2014	Nutcracker Fantasy	Clara (voice)	Lead role	
2015	Strobe Edge	Ninako Kinoshita	Lead role	
2015	Flying Colors	Sayaka Kudo	Lead role	
2016	I Am a Hero	Hiromi Hayakari		
2016	Erased	Airi Katagiri		
2016	The Firefly Summers	Natsumi	Lead role	
2016	Someone	Mizuki Tanabe	Lead role	
2017	March Comes in Like a Lion	Kyōko Kōda		
2017	March Goes out Like a Lamb	Kyōko Kōda		
2017	Narratage	Izumi Kudō	Lead role	
2017	Sekigahara	Hatsume		
2018	Our Departures	Akira Okuzono	Lead role	
2018	Cafe Funiculi Funicula	Kazu Tokita	Lead role	
2019	Fortuna's Eye	Aoi Kiryū	Lead role	
2019	Dragon Quest: Your Story	Bianca (voice)		
2019	Show Me the Way to the Station	Adult Sayaka (voice)		
2019	And Life Goes On	Tōko Ikuta	Lead role	
2021	We Made a Beautiful Bouquet	Kinu Hachiya	Lead role	
2021	Rurouni Kenshin: The Final	Yukishiro Tomoe		
2021	Rurouni Kenshin: The Beginning	Yukishiro Tomoe		
2021	The Supporting Actors: The Movie	Herself		
2021	Gift of Fire	Setsu Asakura	Lead role	
2021	How We Work, How We Live	Herself	Documentary	
2022	Prior Convictions	Kayo Agawa	Lead role	
2022	Phases of the Moon	Ruri Masaki		
2023	Call Me Chihiro	Chihiro / Aya Furusawa	Lead role	
2024	Dear Family	Yūko Yamamoto		
2025	Petals and Memories	Fumiko Kato		
2025	Yukikaze	Takako Terasawa	Cameo	
2025	Black Showman	Mayo Kamio		
2026	Magical Secret Tour	Wakako	Lead role	
2026	Satoko Always	Satoko Nishida	Lead role	

=== TV dramas ===
Year	Drama	Role	Notes	Ref.
2010	The Woman of Steel	Mana Nishibori		
2010	SPEC: Birth	Miyabi Masaki		
2011	Akutō: Jūhanzai Sōsahan	Manami Momose	Episode 5	
2011	The Woman of Steel Season 2	Mana Nishibori		
2011	Odd Family 11	Niko Sanada		
2012	Clover	Yui Akiyama		
2012	SPEC: Life	Miyabi Masaki	Television film	
2012	Mikeneko Homes no Suiri	Asuka Murase	Episodes 8 and 9	
2012	Boku no Natsuyasumi	Haruna Aoyama		
2012	Tsurukame Maternity Center	Sayori Uehara		
2012	The Brave Yoshihiko and The Key of an Evil Spirit	Fake Murasaki	Episode 7	
2013	Otasukeya Jinpachi	Moe Kamiya		
2013	Amachan	Haruko Amano	Asadora	
2013	Tales of the Unusual: Spring 2013	Sumiko Tsujiura	Short drama	
2013	Star Man	Shoko Usui		
2013	The After-Dinner Mysteries Special	Yumiko Shiota	Television film	
2013	Chicken Race	Kumi Sakurai	Television film	
2013	The Stork Nest	Ayumi Niiyama	Television film	
2014	Heartbroken Chocolatier	Matsuri Koyurugi		
2014	Mozu Season 1	Ami Nakajima		
2014	Baseball Brainiacs	Yuzuko Tarumi		
2014	Tonari no Reji no Umekisan	Mika Sawamura		
2015	Your Story	Nana Kurata		
2015	Eien no Bokura: Sea Side Blue	Aoi Matsuoka	Lead role; television film	
2015	Umi ni Furu	Miyuki Amaya	Lead role; miniseries	
2016	Love That Makes You Cry	Oto Sugihara	Lead role	
2017	Hiyokko	Mineko Yatabe	Lead role; Asadora	
2018	Meet Me After School	Hijiri Suenaga	Lead role	
2019	Hiyokko 2	Mineko Maeda	Lead role; miniseries	
2019	And Life Goes On	Tōko Ikuta	Lead role; miniseries	
2020	A Day-Off of Kasumi Arimura	Herself	Lead role; miniseries	
2020	Gift of Fire	Setsu Asakura	Lead role; television film	
2020	Our Sister's Soulmate	Momoko Adachi	Lead role	
2020	Cold Case Season 3	Misa Kifune	Episode 3	
2021	Life's Punchline	Rihoko Nakahama		
2021	Zenkamono	Kayo Agawa	Lead role	
2022	Adventure of Comandante Cappellini	Sakiko Hayami	Television film	
2022	Ishiko and Haneo: You're Suing Me?	Shōko "Ishiko" Ishida	Lead role	
2022	Lost Man Found	Herself	Cameo; episode 1	
2023	What Will You Do, Ieyasu?	Sena	Taiga drama	
2024	Where Does the Sea Begin	Yayoi Momose		
2024	Beyond Goodbye	Saeko	Lead role	
2026	Gift	Hitoka Kiriyama		

=== Stage ===
- Jeanne d'Arc (October 7, 2014 - November 24, 2014), Jeanne d'Arc
- Tomodachi (2021), the second daughter

=== Video games ===
- Layton's Mystery Journey (2017), Katrielle "Kat" Layton

=== Music video appearances ===
- Ketsumeishi - "Nakama" (May 12, 2010)
- Sayaka Shionoya - "Dear Heaven" (December 10, 2012)
- Saku - "Start Me Up" (April 29, 2015)
- Aoi Teshima - "Letter for Tomorrow" (February 10, 2016)
- Nissy - "Happening" and "My Prettiest Girl" (August 24, 2016)

=== Others ===
- The Making of Magical Movies: John Lasseter and Disney Animation (2014), narrator
- 66th NHK Kōhaku Uta Gassen (2015), a judge
- 67th NHK Kōhaku Uta Gassen (2016), red team captain
- 68th NHK Kōhaku Uta Gassen (2017), red team captain
- 64th Japan Record Awards (2022), host

== Awards and nominations ==
Year presented, name of the award ceremony, category, nominee(s) of the award, and the result of the nomination
Year	Award ceremony	Category	Nominated work(s)	Result	Ref.
2014	Short Shorts Film Festival & Asia	Best Actress	Light Along	Won	
2016	39th Japan Academy Film Prize	Best Actress	Flying Colors	Nominated	
2016	39th Japan Academy Film Prize	Newcomer of the Year	Flying Colors	Won	
2016	40th Elan d'or Awards	Newcomer of the Year	Herself	Won	
2016	58th Blue Ribbon Awards	Best Actress	Strobe Edge, Flying Colors	Won	
2016	29th Nikkan Sports Film Awards	Best Newcomer	The Firefly Summers, Someone	Won	
2017	22nd Busan International Film Festival	Asia Star Award	Narratage	Won	
2018	60th Blue Ribbon Awards	Best Actress	Narratage	Nominated	
2021	13th Tama Film Awards	Best Actress	We Made A Beautiful Bouquet	Won	
2021	34th Nikkan Sports Film Awards	Best Actress	We Made A Beautiful Bouquet	Nominated	
2021	16th GQ Men of the Year	Best Actress	We Made A Beautiful Bouquet	Won	
2021	Elle Cinema Awards 2021	Best Actress	We Made A Beautiful Bouquet	Won	
2022	76th Mainichi Film Awards	Best Actress	We Made A Beautiful Bouquet	Nominated	
2022	64th Blue Ribbon Awards	Best Actress	We Made A Beautiful Bouquet	Nominated	
2022	45th Japan Academy Film Prize	Best Actress	We Made A Beautiful Bouquet	Won	
2022	47th Hochi Film Awards	Best Actress	Prior Convictions	Won	
2023	65th Blue Ribbon Awards	Best Actress	Prior Convictions	Nominated	
2023	46th Japan Academy Film Prize	Best Supporting Actress	Phases of the Moon	Nominated	

== Bibliography ==
=== Books ===
- Kimi to Boku no Heya (Shueisha, March 20, 2015), cover, ISBN 9784086800129

=== Photobooks ===
- B.L.T. U-17 Vol.17 (Tokyo News Mook) (February 5, 2011), Tokyo News Service, ISBN 9784863361317
- aBUTTON Vol.4_Yume Arimura Kasumi (Plup Series) (November 30, 2011), Parco, ISBN 9784891949259
- Shinkokyū: Shin Kokyu (November 7, 2013), Shueisha, ISBN 9784087807035
- Oh! My Rody (February 14, 2014), TMWC, ISBN 9784990756505
