= Someone (film) =

Japanese name
- Kanji: 何者
Transcriptions
- Revised Hepburn: Nanimono
- Directed by: Daisuke Miura
- Based on: Nanimono by Ryo Asai
- Produced by: Genki Kawamura
- Starring: Takeru Satoh; Kasumi Arimura; Fumi Nikaidō; Masaki Suda; Masaki Okada; Takayuki Yamada
- Music by: Yasutaka Nakata
- Distributed by: Toho
- Release date: October 15, 2016
- Running time: 97 minutes
- Country: Japan
- Language: Japanese

Someone (何者, Nanimono) is a 2016 Japanese drama film based on the novel by the same name by Ryo Asai. It was released in Japan by Toho on October 15, 2016.

== Plot ==
Five university students gather to exchange information on their job search activities. They encourage each other and post their thoughts and worries on Twitter.

Takuto Ninomiya (Takeru Satoh) observes those around him. His roommate Kotaro Kamiya (Masaki Suda) has a bright personality and communicates well with others. Mizuki Tanabe (Kasumi Arimura) is Kotaro Kamiya's ex-girlfriend. Takuto Ninomiya has feelings for his roommate's ex-girlfriend. Rika Kobayakawa (Fumi Nikaidō) is determined to land a job. Takayoshi Miyamoto (Masaki Okada) is critical of job-seeking activities, but he later tries to get a job.

== Cast ==
- Takeru Satoh as Takuto Ninomiya
- Kasumi Arimura as Mizuki Tanabe
- Masaki Suda as Kotaro Kamiya
- Fumi Nikaidō as Rika Kobayakawa
- Masaki Okada as Takayoshi Miyamoto
- Takayuki Yamada as Takuto's Senior Sawa
