= The Fable =

Japanese manga series and its franchise

- First tankōbon volume cover of The Fable, featuring Akira Sato

ザ・ファブル (Za Faburu)
- Genre: Comedy; Drama; Thriller
- Manga
- Written by: Katsuhisa Minami
- Published by: Kodansha
- English publisher: NA: Kodansha USA
- Imprint: Young Magazine KC
- Magazine: Weekly Young Magazine
- Original run: November 1, 2014 – November 18, 2019
- Volumes: 22
Further information
Manga
Written by	Katsuhisa Minami
Published by	Kodansha
Magazine	Comic Days
Original run	March 6, 2018 – February 26, 2019
Volumes	1
Live-action film
Directed by	Kan Eguchi
Written by	Yūsuke Watanabe
Studio	Geek Pictures; Shochiku
Released	June 21, 2019
Runtime	123 minutes
Live-action film
The Fable: The Killer Who Doesn't Kill
Directed by	Kan Eguchi
Written by	Masahiro Yamaura; Kan Eguchi
Studio	Geek Pictures; Shochiku
Released	June 18, 2021
Runtime	131 minutes
Manga
The Fable: The Second Contact
Written by	Katsuhisa Minami
Published by	Kodansha
Imprint	Young Magazine KC
Magazine	Weekly Young Magazine
Original run	July 19, 2021 – July 10, 2023
Volumes	9
Anime television series
Directed by	Ryōsuke Takahashi; Daisuke Nakajima (Note: Series director (シリーズディレクター))
Written by	Yūya Takashima; Mayumi Morita
Music by	Shūichirō Fukuhiro (S1); Yō Tsuji (S2)
Studio	Tezuka Productions
Licensed by	Disney Platform Distribution
Original network	NNS (Nippon TV)
Original run	April 7, 2024 – present
Episodes	25
Manga
The Fable: The Third Secret
Written by	Katsuhisa Minami
Published by	Kodansha
English publisher	Kodansha (digital)
Imprint	Young Magazine KC
Magazine	Weekly Young Magazine
Original run	March 17, 2025 – present
Volumes	6
Video game
The Fable: Manga Build Roguelike
Developer	Mono Entertainment
Genre	Roguelike deck-building
Platform	Windows; Nintendo Switch
Released	November 6, 2025
- icon

The Fable (Japanese: ザ・ファブル, Hepburn: Za Faburu) is a Japanese manga series written and illustrated by Katsuhisa Minami. It was serialized in Kodansha's seinen manga magazine Weekly Young Magazine from November 2014 to November 2019, with its chapters collected in 22 tankōbon volumes. A sequel series, titled The Fable: The Second Contact, ran in Weekly Young Magazine from July 2021 to July 2023. A third series, titled The Fable: The Third Secret, began serialization in March 2025. The story follows a young professional hitman who, after orders from his boss, is tasked to live for one year in Osaka as a ordinary citizen, without killing anyone.

A live-action film adaptation premiered in Japan in June 2019 and a sequel premiered in June 2021. An anime television series adaptation produced by Tezuka Productions aired from April to September 2024. A second season is set to premiere in January 2027.

By October 2026, the manga had over 30 million copies in circulation, making it one of the best-selling manga series. In 2017, The Fable won the 41st Kodansha Manga Award for the General category.

== Plot ==
An exceptionally skilled professional killer known as "Fable" is feared by the Japanese underworld, politicians, mobsters, and public figures. One day, his boss orders him to put everything on hold and lead the life of an ordinary citizen with the assistance of a yakuza clan in Osaka. He is also banned from killing anyone for an entire year. Armed with his Nighthawk pistol and given the pseudonym of Akira Sato, Fable must adjust to normal life alongside his assistant, who is ordered to act as his sister and given the pseudonym of Yoko, all while dealing with criminal elements in Osaka that have their own suspicions about his past.

== Characters ==
Akira Sato (佐藤 明, Satō Akira)
Voiced by: Kazuyuki Okitsu (Japanese); Jonah Scott (English)
Portrayed by: Junichi Okada, Ryoka Minamide (young)
A quietly spoken but highly skilled hitman known only as "Fable". He has had a female assistant and driver for the past year and knows nothing about her identity. After being ordered to lay low for a year, he is given the name "Akira Sato", and his assistant will as his sister. Although he is a expert killer, he has no attachment to his work and his emotions, coming off as socially awkward to others. He is a big fan of Jackal Tomioka. Whenever he needs to switch mindsets, he makes a bizarre face while tapping his forehead. He tends to go completely naked when at home. His tongue is very sensitive to hot foods.
Yoko Sato (佐藤 洋子, Satō Yōko)
Voiced by: Miyuki Sawashiro (Japanese); Miya Kodama (English)
Portrayed by: Fumino Kimura
A woman with long brown hair and a photographic memory who acts as Fable's assistant and driver. She is ordered to lay low with him for a year, acting as his sister and given the name Yoko Sato. Compared to Akira, she is more worldly and quick to adapt to life as an ordinary citizen. She has a high tolerance for alcohol, which she uses to her advantage when dealing with flirtatious men by making them extremely drunk. She is also very skilled in combat, but has never killed anyone personally. Her real name is Rei Kanda (神田 麗, Kanda Rei).
Boss (ボス, Bosu)
Voiced by: Tetsuo Komura (Japanese); Steve Blum (English)
Portrayed by: Kōichi Satō
The man who assigns Fable his jobs. He tells him to take a year off to lay low in Osaka with the Maguro Group.
Misaki Shimizu (清水 岬, Shimizu Misaki)
Voiced by: Kana Hanazawa (Japanese); Felecia Angelle (English)
Portrayed by: Mizuki Yamamoto
A woman who lives alone in an apartment near where Fable and his assistant stay in Osaka. She works multiple jobs to repay her father's debts, but she is blackmailed into agreeing to become a call girl by Kojima when he learns of her former career as a gravure idol.
Jackal Tomioka (ジャッカル 富岡, Jakkaru Tomioka)
Voiced by: Jun Fukushima (Japanese); Daniel Ross (English)
Portrayed by: Daisuke Miyagawa
A popular comedian who Fable thinks is really funny.
Hiroshi Hamada (浜田 広志, Hamada Hiroshi)
Voiced by: Kōji Ishii (Japanese); Jamieson Price (English)
Portrayed by: Ken Mitsuishi
Chief in the Maguro Group who accepts the arrangement to shelter Fable and his assistant.
Takeshi Ebihara (海老原 剛士, Ebihara Takeshi)
Voiced by: Akio Otsuka (Japanese); Brent Mukai (English)
Portrayed by: Ken Yasuda
Captain in the Maguro Group, Ebihara is unhappy about the arrangement to shelter Fable and his assistant. He is suspicious of Fable's motives, but after suffering a heart attack he involves Akira in his operations.
Kenji Kojima (小島 賢治, Kojima Kenji)
Voiced by: Kenjiro Tsuda (Japanese); SungWon Cho (English)
Portrayed by: Yuya Yagira
Middle-ranking member of the Maguro Group who has spent the last few years in prison. Upon his release, he decides to advance his career within the Maguro Group and encroaches on Sunagawa's territory.
Shuichi Sunagawa (砂川 宗一, Sunagawa Sōichi)
Voiced by: Kōjirō Takahashi (Japanese); Doug Stone (English)
Portrayed by: Osamu Mukai
Middle-ranking member of the Maguro Group who runs a call girl business and who sees Kojima as a threat. He secretly plans to move up in the Maguro Group.
Ryo Kuroshio (黒塩 遼, Kuroshio Ryō)
Voiced by: Ryota Iwasaki (Japanese); Adam McArthur (English)
Portrayed by: Kai Inowaki
A lowly member of the Maguro Group who harbors ambitions of becoming an assassin. He is referred to as "Kuro" (クロ) by other members of the Maguro Group.
Katsuya Takahashi (高橋 勝也, Takahashi Katsuya)
Voiced by: Yudai Mino (Japanese); Todd Haberkorn (English)
A lowly member of the Maguro Group who carries out tasks for Ebihara.
Matsu (マツ)
Voiced by: Kiyomitsu Mizuuchi (Japanese); Feodor Chin (English)
A middle-aged man whose left eye is always half-closed. He appears to be the owner of a snack bar, but he works in corpse disposal, smuggling, and is an information broker.
Kenjiro Takoda (田高田 健二郎, Takōda Kenjirō)
Voiced by: Takeharu Onishi (Japanese); Eric Bauza (English)
Portrayed by: Jiro Sato
Misaki's boss and the manager of Octopus who initially gives Akira a temporary job as a delivery driver, but then hires him full-time.
Etsuji Kainuma (貝沼 悦司, Kainuma Etsuji)
Voiced by: Takumi Asahina (Japanese); Michael Sinterniklaas (English)
Portrayed by: Masao Yoshii
A spoiled young man of a wealthy mother who is employed at Octopus and is secretly obsessed with Misaki.
Master (マスター, Masutā)
Voiced by: Kazuya Ichijō
Portrayed by: Seiji Rokkaku
A bartender who works at Bar Buffalo, a bar Yoko frequents.
Yuki Kawai (河合 ユウキ, Kawai Yūki)
Voiced by: Yuki Kaji (Japanese); Andrew Frankel (English)
Portrayed by: Shingo Fujimori
A man Yoko meets at Bar Buffalo whom she like to drink with because he does not have her capacity for alcohol consumption.
Rei Utsubo (宇津帆 玲, Utsubo Rei)
Voiced by: Shinshū Fuji (Japanese); Keith Silverstein (English)
Portrayed by: Shinichi Tsutsumi
A man who uses the Taihei Detective Agency as a cover to commits fraud, blackmail, kidnapping, and murder for money. His real name is Koichi Kawahira (川平 浩一, Kawahira Kōichi).
Hinako Saba (佐羽 ヒナコ, Saba Hinako)
Voiced by: Chika Anzai (Japanese); Abbey Veffer (English)
Portrayed by: Yurina Hirate
She witnessed an assassination by Fable, and now uses a wheelchair after her legs were damaged in a car crash. Utsubo killed her parents and blamed Fable so he can keep her as a sex slave while promising to avenge her parents. She is commonly referred to as "Hina" (ヒナ).
Hiroshi Suzuki (鈴木 ヒロシ, Suzuki Hiroshi)
Voiced by: Takehito Koyasu (Japanese); John Choi (English)
Portrayed by: Masanobu Ando
An assassin hired by Utsubo to assist in kidnapping Kainuma to extort money from his mother.
Tsutomu Isaki (井崎 勤, Izaki Tsutomu)
Voiced by: Yoshihiro Kanemitsu (Japanese); Jon Bailey (English)
Portrayed by: Jun Kurose
An associate of Utsubo's who helps with his illegal schemes. He is a former member of the Maguro Group.
Yamaoka (山岡)
Voiced by: Koichi Yamadera
Yuukari (ユーカリ)
Voiced by: Hiroyuki Yoshino
Azami (アザミ)
Voiced by: Takanori Hoshino
Jiro (二郎)
Voiced by: Taiten Kusunoki
Koji Mizuno (水野 浩二, Mizuno Koji)
Voiced by: Satoshi Mikami
Cricket (スズムシ, Suzumushi)
Voiced by: Seiyū Fujiwara

== Media ==
=== Manga ===
Written and illustrated by Katsuhisa Minami, The Fable was serialized in Kodansha's seinen manga magazine Weekly Young Magazine from November 1, 2014, to November 18, 2019. Kodansha collected its chapters in 22 tankōbon volumes, released from March 6, 2015, to June 5, 2020.

A sequel, titled The Fable: The Second Contact (ザ・ファブル The second contact), ran in Weekly Young Magazine from July 19, 2021, to July 10, 2023. Kodansha collected its chapters in nine tankōbon volumes, released from November 5, 2021, to November 6, 2023.

A spin-off, also titled The Fable, but written in hiragana (ざ・ふぁぶる) instead of katakana, was published on Comic Days online platform from March 6, 2018, to February 26, 2019. A collected tankōbon, which also includes other stories by Minami, was published on June 5, 2020.

A third series, titled The Fable: The Third Secret (ザ・ファブル The third secret), began serialization in Weekly Young Magazine on March 17, 2025. The series is published digitally in English by Kodansha on its K Manga digital service.

In March 2022, Kodansha USA announced it had licensed the series for English digital publication; in October 2023, it was announced that the manga would be published in print, with the first volume released on April 9, 2024.

=== Live-action films ===
A live-action film adaptation directed by Kan Eguchi premiered in Japan on June 21, 2019. The film stars Junichi Okada as Fable.

A sequel film, titled The Fable: The Killer Who Doesn't Kill (ザ・ファブル 殺さない殺し屋, Za Faburu Korosanai Koroshiya), was originally announced to premiere on February 5, 2021; however, a month prior to the planned release date, it was announced that the film would be postponed due to the COVID-19 pandemic, and it eventually premiered on June 18 of that same year.

=== Anime ===
An anime television series adaptation was announced on July 10, 2023. It was animated by Tezuka Productions and directed by Ryōsuke Takahashi, with scripts supervised by Yūya Takashima and co-written by Mayumi Morita, character designs handled by Kyuma Oshita, Saki Hasegawa and Junichi Hayama, and music composed by Shūichirō Fukuhiro. The series aired from April 7 to September 29, 2024, on Nippon TV and its affiliates. (Note: Nippon TV listed the series premiere on April 6, 2024 at 24:55, which is effectively April 7 at 12:55 a.m. JST.) The first opening theme song is "Professionalism feat. Hannya" (Professionalism feat. 般若), performed by ALI, and the first ending theme song is "Odd Numbers", performed by Umeda Cypher. The second opening theme song is "Switch" (スイッチ, Suitchi), performed by Umeda Cypher, and the second ending theme song is "Beyond feat. Mari", performed by ALI. The adaptation was announced to be produced under Disney's partnership with Kodansha, streaming on Disney+ worldwide and Hulu in the United States.

A second season of the anime series was announced on April 2, 2026. The cast and staff from the first season are reprising their roles, with Yō Tsuji serving as the new composer. The season is set to premiere on January 9, 2027.

==== Episodes ====
No.	Title (Note: All English titles are taken from Hulu.)	Directed by (Note: Information is taken from the ending credits of each episode.)	Written by	Storyboarded by	Original release date
1	"Moving"; Transliteration: "O Hikkoshi" (Japanese: お引っ越し)	Shintaro Matsui	Yūya Takashima	Takashi Kamei	April 7, 2024
After Fable finishes a job, killing a minor boss and his henchmen, he and his female assistant share grilled fish with his boss, who informs him that this will be the last job for a year. They both must spend a year laying low in Osaka with the Maguro Group and not kill anyone during that time. He is given the name and identity of Akira Sato and his assistant will act as his sister, Yoko. On their way there, Yoko stops for a coffee and while waiting, Akira is accosted by two minor thugs. Acting on instinct, he almost kills them when one touches him and he realizes laying low may be more difficult than he thought. They arrive in Osaka and Akira throws his internal "switch" and changes to speaking with an Osaka dialect. Meanwhile, only Chief Hamada and Captain Ebihara of the Maguro Group know of the arrangement.
2	"A Wonderful Night"; Transliteration: "Subarashī Yoru" (Japanese: 素晴らしい夜)	Hiromichi Matano	Yūya Takashima	Kazuo Terada	April 14, 2024
Akira and Yoko meet Hamada and Ebihara dressed as holidaymakers and appear quite ordinary, although Akira's eye for detail upsets Ebihara. Ebihara allocates them two nearby apartments and warns them not to damage his vintage Hakosuka car. Akira quickly removes all the hidden surveillance cameras in his apartment to avoid surveillance, and also because he walks around naked indoors. Outside, Ebihara tells his underling Takahashi that he wants to get rid of them. When Yoko invites Akira out for drinks, Takahashi hires a local kickboxer to hassle Akira. He challenges Akira outside the bar, but rather than fight back, Akira feigns weakness while accepting a few blows to avoid a serious confrontation. He is offered a handkerchief for his bloody nose by a female neighbor that he noticed earlier in the day.
3	"Tag"; Transliteration: "Onigokko" (Japanese: 鬼ごっこ)	Daisuke Nakajima	Yūya Takashima	Daisuke Nakajima	April 21, 2024
Ebihara is surprised when Takahashi reports that Akira took a beating and seemed cowered. Boss sends a message recommending that the Satos each get a pet. Akira decides on a black-headed parrot from Brazil, which he later names it "Captain", and Yoko selects a hamster. While at the pet store, Akira sees the kickboxer from the previous night and takes off pretending to be frightened, outrunning the kickboxer and jumping from a high overhead bridge to escape. Ebihara gives some money to Takahashi to invite Yoko out for the evening and get background information on Akira, while Ebihara invites Akira out for the night. Ebihara takes Akira to a secluded spot and asks him to kill a strong local thug who owes the clan money. He expects Akira to win in six seconds to prove he really is the killer he is supposed to be and not an imposter. Akira touches his forehead to throw his internal "switch", dons a two-hole balaclava, and races out of the car towards his opponent.
4	"Chatting About Life"; Transliteration: "Inochi no Hanashi......" (Japanese: 命の話......)	Noriyuki Nomata	Mayumi Morita	Kazuo Terada	April 28, 2024
Akira races towards the thug, but instead of hitting him he leaps over his head, pulling him down by his hair and disabling him within about three seconds, but leaving him still alive. Ebihara is impressed as is Kuroshio, one of the Maguro Group. However, Akira refuses to kill him even when Ebihara threatens to shoot him. In an ensuing discussion, Akira explains that he is just doing his job and emotion plays no part in it. Ebihara kills the thug and orders Kuroshio to dispose of the body and tell no-one what he saw. They stop for a meal, and Ebihara suggests that Akira get a job to avoid becoming a recluse. Meanwhile, Takahashi has taken Yoko out for the night, but she gets them both incredibly drunk so when they return to her apartment, he passes out.
5	"You Listening to Me?!"; Transliteration: "Kīton no ka Kora‼" (Japanese: 聞いとんのかコラ‼)	Daisuke Nakajima	Yūya Takashima	Daisuke Nakajima	May 5, 2024
Hamada reprimands Ebihara for threatening Akira, which could bring retribution down on the Maguro Group. He then warns Ebihara that Kojima will be released from prison in the coming week and to keep him out of trouble. Meanwhile, Akira's boss calls him to say that Jackal Tomioka has an acting role in a new TV soap opera, which Akira finds surprising but watches it anyway. Akira later unsuccessfully applies for some delivery driver jobs. However, after meeting with Misaki in the street, she takes him to her workplace, Octopus, where they need a driver. Misaki's boss, Kenjiro Takoda, offers Akira a deliver job for a low salary and he surprisingly accepts. Akira dutifully tells Ebihara about the job, but Ebihara is horrified that Akira has struck up a friendship with a local citizen.
6	"Prison Release Jamboree"; Transliteration: "Dedokoro Iwai" (Japanese: 出所祝い)	Takashi Kamei	Yūya Takashima	Kei Sotokawa	May 12, 2024
Ebihara welcomes Kojima back following his release from prison, but the latter suggests the Maguro Group has gone soft. Elsewhere, Akira carries out his first delivery and returns in half the time, much to everyone's surprise. Takoda takes the staff out for a meal and they are surprised when Akira eats the entirety of the food, including the shells, which he explains by saying he had a tough upbringing. A co-worker, Etsuji Kainuma, offers to walk Misaki to her night job but secretly steals her keys. Meanwhile, Takoda takes Akira to a bar where Kuroshio soon enters with an associate and he tries to impress Akira, who just ignores him. Kainuma later explores Misaki's apartment, puts on her underwear, and discovers she is a former gravure idol. Misaki arrives home without her keys and calls Akira for help. Although he could easily enter her apartment, he says he cannot help and offers that she can stay with him and Yoko. When she reluctantly agrees, they wake up an intoxicated Yoko.
7	"Realist"; Transliteration: "Genjitsu Shugi♡" (Japanese: 現実主義♡)	Rei Kurosawa	Yūya Takashima	Kazuo Terada	May 19, 2024
Misaki leaves the next morning and Akira apologizes for Yoko's drunken behavior the previous night. Meanwhile, Takahashi visits Kojima who still behaves like an aggressive prisoner, randomly hitting Takahashi and disparaging the Maguro Group. When they discover Ebihara has suffered a heart attack and is hospitalized, Kojima asks Hamada if he can borrow Takahashi. Kojima later pulls a knife on Akira at his apartment and demands that both the latter and Yoko give him 50,000 yen a month, which Akira agrees. Kojima then buys a gun and takes Takahashi along to start collecting old debts, but he kills the first of his debtors just for the adrenaline rush. Elsewhere, Kuroshio offers to become Akira's disciple and make a name for himself but Akira discourages him.
8	"Because I'm... You know!" Transliteration: "Datte Datte, Nanda Mon♪" (Japanese: だってだって、なんだもん♪)	Shuma Kanikubo	Mayumi Morita	Kazuo Terada	May 26, 2024
Yoko decides to go out drinking while Akira prefers to stay home and watch the TV series featuring Jackal. She again visits Bar Buffalo and spends the evening coquettishly toying with a young man named Yuki Kawai before she leaves with his phone number. Elsewhere, Kojima proposes starting a call girl business to Ebihara, who forbids it because it will create a conflict with Sunagawa. Kojima proceeds with his plan anyway and asks Kuroshio to recruit the girls. During the meeting, Kuroshio informs Kojima about Misaki. Meanwhile at work, Misaki is unhappy about a design she has made. However, when Akira makes a childish attempt at some drawings, she and her boss agree that they suit the project and he gets a raise. Later in Taihei, Sunagawa angrily reacts to the news that Kojima is encroaching on his territory.
9	"You Mean a Hitman...?"; Transliteration: "Moshi ka Shite Koroshiya....." (Japanese: もしかして殺し屋.....)	Hiromichi Matano	Mayumi Morita	Yuzo Sato	June 2, 2024
Kojima turns up at Misaki's apartment and pressures her into working for him as a call girl, while claiming that Kuroshio injured his leg protecting her. He threatens to cause trouble for her friends and at her workplace, demanding her answer in 24 hours. Misaki later invites Akira out for dinner to thank him for helping at work, but when she presses him about his wilderness survival skills, he senses something is wrong. The next day, Misaki learns that her boss was attacked and the business is temporarily closed, but she still tells Kojima that she will not work for him. Elsewhere, Ebihara asks Akira to look into Kojima's activities and he reports that Kojima is planning a call girl business and has recently shot someone in the warehouse. Ebihara then offers his precious car to Akira to help him deal with Kojima. Meanwhile, Sunagawa hires a hooded hitman to kill Kojima.
10	"The Phantom of the Balcony"; Transliteration: "Beranda no Kaijin......" (Japanese: ベランダの怪人......)	Shintaro Matsui	Yūya Takashima	Shintaro Matsui	June 9, 2024
Sunagawa gives his hitman two targets, Kojima and someone else. Elsewhere, Akira takes Ebihara's car to Kojima's apartment to retrieve a gun, and installs surveillance cameras. He only just manages to escape over the balcony before being detected. Takoda is later beaten up by Kojima's men. As a result, Misaki reluctantly agrees to work for Kojima under contract for three months to avoid further trouble. Meanwhile, Akira has discerned her predicament and prepares to rescue her without being detected. He arranges for Yoko to give Takahashi a watch with a GPS tracker and fashions a rudimentary gun from hardware supplies and scrap metal.
11	"The Fated Day"; Transliteration: "Unmei no Tsuitachi Desu♪" (Japanese: 運命の一日です♪)	Ryuta Yamamoto	Yūya Takashima	Kazuo Terada	June 16, 2024
Misaki calls Akira and asks him to tell their boss she is ill and will not be in for work the next day. Akira thanks her for her kindness and tells her not to worry about anything. Sunagawa and Kojima both prepare for their meeting, each one making arrangements to eliminate the other. To protect Misaki, and with Yoko's help, Akira makes his own plans to appear at the meeting by using the tracker to follow Takahashi. Meanwhile, a man Ebihara does not know visits him in hospital and questions him about involving Akira in his operations. Elsewhere, as the meeting begins, Sunagawa has one of his men take Misaki aside to "initiate" her into the call girl business. The man strips off Misaki's clothing, but Akira enters the building and silently renders him unconscious with a series of powerful blows to his body.
12	"There's Always Someone Better"; Transliteration: "Ue ni wa Ue" (Japanese: 上には上──。)	Tōru Yoshida	Yūya Takashima	Daisuke Nakajima	June 23, 2024
Akira tells one of Kojima's wounded men, the kickboxer, to take Misaki home when he gives the signal. He then proceeds to neutralize the tense situation, wounding Sunagawa's hitman and abducting Kojima. Sunagawa's group suspect that he is Fable. Meanwhile, Boss warns Ebihara not to involve Akira any further in his affairs. Akira and Yoko drive off with Kojima locked in the trunk of the car, while Akira tries to quell Yoko's fears that he may have killed someone. The kickboxer takes Misaki home and offers to protect her if required. Back at the warehouse, Sunagawa calls off any further action against Kojima, hoping to avoid any repercussions within the Maguro Group.
13	"Aniki... Aniki..." (Japanese: アニキ.....アニキ.....。)	Ayaka Kobayashi	Mayumi Morita	Kazuo Terada	June 30, 2024
Akira takes Kojima back to the apartment's garage and delivers him to Ebihara, who is briefly out of hospital. Ebihara decides that even though Kojima is like a brother to him, the latter is a liability and kills him. He then calls Matsu to clean up and bury Kojima's body. Meanwhile, a cold and distraught Misaki asks Yoko for shelter for the night. After Misaki faints in the bath, the very drunk Yoko has to get Akira to help lift her naked body out of the bathtub. Before returning to the hospital, Ebihara tells Sunagawa that the Kojima matter is closed and warns him to stay away from Misaki. He later gives the same advice to Kuroshio and to keep quiet about Akira's real purpose. However, Kuroshio is secretly still obsessed about becoming an apprentice to the man he believes is Fable.
14	"I Love You, Nii-san!"; Transliteration: "Suki Desu Ani-san!!" (Japanese: 好きです兄さん!!)	Takashi Kamei	Mayumi Morita	Daisuke Nakajima	July 7, 2024
Sunagawa tries to bribe Matsu to divulge details about Fable. However, he reminds Sunagawa that information in the organization is only made available on a need-to-know basis. Meanwhile, Akira plans a three day wilderness camping trip to maintain his survival skills because he suspects that he is losing his edge, and reluctantly agrees to allow Kuroshio to accompany him. Yoko drops them off as dawn approaches and although Kuroshio becomes apprehensive when Akira has only a knife and basic survival tools, he nevertheless follows his nii-san (Note: Nii-san is the Japanese honorific for "older brother".) into the woods, carrying the bare minimum of camping gear.
15	"Survival Training?"; Transliteration: "Moshi ka Shite Sabaibaru.....。" (Japanese: もしかしてサバイバル.....。)	Shotaro Kamiyama	Yūya Takashima	Kazuo Terada	July 14, 2024
Kuroshio struggles to keep up with Akira, who leads him through the forest to a clearing where they make camp for the night. Akira cooks a snake he killed earlier in the day and Kuroshio has to overcome his biases to eat it. The next day, Kuroshio is confronted by a black bear at their camp but Akira arrives back in time to scare it off. Kuroshio slowly becomes awed by Akira's intensity and practical survival skills such as cooking and eating frogs and grasshoppers to keep up his strength. Meanwhile, Yoko plans another night out drinking and calls up the man she met at Bar Buffalo, Yuki Kawai.
16	"Mountaineer Man"; Transliteration: "Gezan no Otoko.....。" (Japanese: 下山の男.....。)	Michinosuke Nakamura	Yūya Takashima	Michinosuke Nakamura	July 21, 2024
While Akira prepares to fight off the bear who attacked them earlier, Yoko goes to Bar Buffalo to engage in a drinking session with Kawai. Akira creates a lance with a branch and his knife, which he coats with venom from a snake he previously caught. When the bear attacks and Kuroshio trembles in fear, Akira calmly fights it off and stabs it with the lance to teach it to be wary of humans in the future. Meanwhile, Yoko goes head-to-head in a drinking session with Kawai drinking shots of tequila, each planning to score a conquest over the other. Yoko ultimately wins, with Kawai retching in the bathroom from his excessive consumption of alcohol, and eventually collapsing from alcohol poisoning. The next morning, Yoko picks up Akira and Kuroshio. Akira is grateful that he has not lost his edge, while Kuroshio is more impressed than ever by Akira's skills and understanding of the mechanics of defeating an adversary.
17	"Rei Utsubo"; Transliteration: "Utsubo Rei....。" (Japanese: ウツボレイ....。)	Shintaro Matsui	Mayumi Morita	Shintaro Matsui	July 28, 2024
At the Taihei Detective Agency, Rei Utsubo, his associate Tsutomu Isaki and Hinako Saba, who uses a wheelchair, reveal their main activity is intimidating and kidnapping the spoiled children of monster parents. Utsubo later buries alive a young man who has squandered his parents' money and from whom were extorted 10 million yen. Utsubo adds an assassin, Hiroshi Suzuki, to his small team and confides in him that he is concerned about the possible existence of Fable, who may be a threat to their business. That evening in a park, Akira and Hinako appear to recognize each other from one of his earlier assassination assignments. Meanwhile, Utsubo asks Isaki to get information from Kuroshio about the Maguro Group, but Kuroshio is uncooperative. Utsubo later asks Isaki and Suzuki to get information on their next target, Itsuji Kainuma. Elsewhere, Akira asks Yoko to look into details of a murder four years ago in Tokyo. At work, Kainuma is becoming more obsessive about Misaki and when she mentions she will be working late that night at a new job, he plans to enter her apartment again.
18	"Cheerio"; Transliteration: "Kanpai no Pai......。" (Japanese: カンパイのパイ......。)	Takashi Kamei	Mayumi Morita	Takashi Kamei	August 4, 2024
From Yoko's research, Akira connects Hinako to his assassination of a man involved in prostitution. Meanwhile, Kainuma discovers the lock on Misaki's apartment has been changed. He is then seen there by Isaki, who realizes that Kainuma is stalking Misaki. Elsewhere, the hooded assassin arranges a meeting with Suzuki to share information about Fable, but things go awry and Suzuki kills him and his associate. While Akira waits to see Hinako again later on, Suzuki intercepts and warns him to stay away from his "sister". Under the pretext of offering free checks for hidden cameras, Utsubo and Isaki enter Misaki's apartment. They find the camera planted by Kainuma while installing some of their own.
19	"Lies and Falsehoods"; Transliteration: "Uso to Uso.....。" (Japanese: ウソと噓.....。)	Takuo Suzuki	Yūya Takashima	Kazuo Terada	August 18, 2024 (Note: Due to the broadcast of the 2024 Summer Olympics, this episode was delayed one week from its originally scheduled air date of August 11, 2024.)
At Octopus, Takoda gives Akira the task of drawing a Christmas card although he knows little about Santa Claus or the tradition. When Akira delivers some business cards to the Taihei Detective Agency, he sees Hinako but also recognizes Utsubo as the third of his three targets four years earlier when he first saw Hinako. That night, Utsubo tells Suzuki how he built a prostitution ring consisting of underage girls who were either runways or kidnapped. As a result, his associates were soon assassinated. One of them, Kawahira, was with Hinako prior to the accident that injured her. After laying low for about a year, Utsubo visited her at the hospital posing as a detective. Upon learning about how terrified she was of Fable, he killed Hinako's parents so she would become dependent on him. Utsubo later invites Kainuma and his mother to his office where he exposes Kainuma's interest in Misaki.
20	"24 Hours"; Transliteration: "24 Jikan....。" (Japanese: 24時間....。)	Shotaro Kamiyama	Yūya Takashima	Kazuo Terada	August 25, 2024 (Note: Episodes 20 and 21 aired consecutively on August 25, 2024.)
Utsubo and Isaki combine to implicate Kainuma in stalking Misaki and solicit a payment of 60 million yen from his mother using footage from the cameras they placed in her apartment. Meanwhile, Akira again meets Hinako in the park and encourages her to visualize her legs working. When Suzuki hears Kainuma threatening to kill Misaki via a bug planted in his apartment, Utsubo instructs him to kidnap Kainuma for the next phase of his operation. Hinako overhears their discussion and calls Misaki at work to warn her just as Kainuma lunges towards her with a knife. Akira reacts instinctively and quickly disables him. Kainuma later tries to flee to avoid questioning, but he is kidnapped by Suzuki, which is witnessed by Akira. Isaki drives off with Kainuma, but Akira gives Suzuki 24 hours to return him unharmed. Suzuki gets Akira's address from Isaki and visits the apartment only to find Yoko. When he threatens her, she cleverly disarms him. Elsewhere in the forest, Kainuma escapes from Isaki.
21	"The ABCs of Villainy"; Transliteration: "Akutō-tachi no ABC" (Japanese: 悪党たちのABC)	Minoru Yoshida	Mayumi Morita	Minoru Yoshida	August 25, 2024
Akira arrives home to find Suzuki tied up after Yoko beat him up in a fight. Akira again demands the return of Kainuma but when Suzuki calls Isaki, he is told that Kainuma fell down a cliff and died. Akira then lets Suzuki leave after he and Yoko had demoralized him with their superior skills. Suzuki updates Utsubo of his encounter with the Satos, surmising that they are part of Fable and he demands to know why Utsubo is hunting Fable. Utsubo explains that his brother, Kawahira, was the one who Akira killed four years ago while Hinako was sitting in the car. Suzuki agrees to work with Utsubo to kill Akira, stressing that they must do it without drawing attention from the Maguro Group. Utsubo devises a plan to trap the Satos using Hinako as bait.
22	"Doorstep Man"; Transliteration: "Doa Mae no Otoko......。" (Japanese: ドア前の男......。)	Shintaro Matsui, Fumio Maezono	Mayumi Morita	Mamoru Kurosawa	September 8, 2024 (Note: This episode was delayed one week from its originally scheduled air date of September 1, 2024.)
Suzuki visits Matsu to buy a silencer in preparation for the assault on Akira, but also to prepare an escape route overseas if the attempt fails. Akira learns about the murder of Hinako's parents from Yoko. Meanwhile, Utsubo tells Hinako that Akira killed her parents and she asks to be involved in Utsubo's attempt to kill Akira. The three leave the apartment after Suzuki sets a booby trap behind the door linked to a hand grenade. Utsubo and Hinako leave town and Utsubo calls Akira and arranges to meet at his apartment. Akira suspects a trap and after he opens the door, he easily avoids the exploding grenade while Suzuki watches on from a distance.
23	"Horn"; Transliteration: "Kurakushon" (Japanese: クラクション)	Takashi Kamei	Yūya Takashima	Takashi Kamei	September 15, 2024
After the failed attempt to kill Akira with a grenade, Akira sees Suzuki leave and he asks Yoko to follow him. Suzuki meets up with Utsubo and Hinako in the forest where he captures Yoko and ties her to a tree. Meanwhile, Akira has Kuroshio bring him a fast car and they arrive there a short time later. Akira gets Kuroshio to sound the car's horn to create a distraction while he approaches Utsubo's group. Hinako attempts to shoot Utsubo because she deduced that he killed her parents, not Akira. When she shakily stands to get a better shot, Suzuki reveals that she has stepped on an anti-personnel mine planted by Utsubo to trap Akira. As she fires and staggers backwards, Akira rushes from the bushes to stop her from falling.
24	"Starry Sky Lullaby"; Transliteration: "Hoshizora no Rarabai.....。" (Japanese: 星空のララバイ.....。)	Shuma Kanikubo	Yūya Takashima	Kazuo Terada	September 22, 2024
Under a starry sky, Akira supports Hinako as she shakily stands on the mine. Utsubo reaches for his gun but Akira shoots and wounds him, although Utsubo manages to throw a grenade. Akira shields Hinako from the blast with his body. Suzuki decides to help save Hinako, releasing Yoko who then holds a gun on Utsubo. Akira arranges for Suzuki to use the forked bucket of an excavator to partially shield Hinako while he pulls her off the mine. While they survive, Akira is wounded. Frustrated at the failure of his plans, Utsubo throws another grenade prompting Suzuki to shoot him in the head, killing him. Once Utsubo's body is buried, Hinako gratefully thanks Akira as he leaves, realizing she will never see him again. Back home, after Yoko patches Akira's wound, he immediately goes back to sketching Christmas card images for Takoda.
25	"Imagination Man"; Transliteration: "Sōzō Suru Otoko ♪" (Japanese: 想像する男♪)	Daisuke Nakajima, Takashi Kamei	Yūya Takashima	Kazuo Terada, Michinosuke Nakamura	September 29, 2024
The Taihei police find Kainuma's body in a river. Suzuki gets Kuroshio to take him to meet Isaki, whom he then kills because he considered him to be a liability. He gives Isaki's money to Kuroshio and a letter from Hinako for Akira. Suzuki warns him to forget about becoming an assassin because he would never be a match for Akira or Yoko. Akira's Christmas card design is a success and Takoda suggests they invite Yoko and celebrate Christmas together, hoping that Akira and Misaki will hook up. Akira reads Hinako's heartfelt letter in which she thanks him for everything he has done for her. He then burns it per her request.

=== Video game ===
In September 2024, Kodansha Game Creators' Lab announced that Mono Entertainment was developing a roguelike deck-building video game, titled The Fable: Manga Build Roguelike (ザ・ファブル Manga Build Roguelike), for Windows and Nintendo Switch. A demo of the game was displayed at the Kodansha Game Creators' Lab booth at Tokyo Game Show 2024. It was released on November 6, 2025, and is available in Japanese, English, and traditional/simplified Chinese.

== Reception ==
By January 2021, the manga had eight million copies in circulation; 15 million copies in circulation by March 2022; over 20 million copies in circulation by October 2022; over 25 million copies in circulation by June 2024; and over 30 million copies in circulation by October 2026.

The Fable won the 41st Kodansha Manga Award for the general category in 2017. Alongside Blue Period, the series ranked 14th on Takarajimasha's Kono Manga ga Sugoi! list of best manga of 2020 for male readers. It was picked as a nominee for "Best Comic" at the 51st Angoulême International Comics Festival, held in 2024.
