= Monday (2000 film) =

- Monday DVD cover
- Directed by: Sabu
- Written by: Sabu
- Produced by: Bong-Ou Lee
- Starring: Shinichi Tsutsumi; Yasuko Matsuyuki; Ren Ohsugi
- Cinematography: Kazuto Sato
- Edited by: Kumio Onaga
- Music by: Kenichiro Shibuya
- Production companies: Cine Qua Non Films; CineRocket
- Distributed by: Filmmuseum Distributie; Rapid Eye Movies
- Release dates: February 6, 2000 (Berlin Film Festival); April 29, 2000 (Japan)
- Running time: 100 minutes
- Country: Japan
- Language: Japanese

Monday (Japanese: マンデイ, Hepburn: Mandei) is a 2000 Japanese comedy thriller drama film directed by Sabu. The film was featured at the 2000 Berlin Film Festival and won the FIPRESCI Award "for its austere, dark wit and keen eye for human foibles."

== Plot ==
Takagi (Shinichi Tsutsumi), a seemingly average Japanese businessman, wakes up in a hotel room but doesn't know how he wound up there. When a packet of "purification salt" falls out of his pocket, he starts having memories of a funeral and a meeting with a yakuza boss. Soon he finds out he is in deep trouble.

== Cast ==
- Shin'ichi Tsutsumi as Koichi Takagi
- Yasuko Matsuyuki as Yuko Kirishima
- Ren Ohsugi as Murai Yoshio
- Masanobu Andō as Mitsuo Kondo
- Hideki Noda as Shingo Kamiyama
- Akira Yamamoto as Kiichiro Hanai
- Naomi Nishida as Yuki Machida
- Susumu Terajima as Saburô Nakano

== Reception ==
The New York Times found that "'Monday' has some of Sabu’s sharpest satire" and "offers a lot of stylish parody as it tracks the increasingly grim trajectory of the salaryman’s lost weekend." Derek Elley in Variety wrote that "Sabu makes a stunning return to form with Monday, his fourth and best movie to date."
