= List of The Fable chapters =

The Fable (ザ・ファブル, Za Faburu) is a manga series written and illustrated by Katsuhisa Minami. It was originally serialized in Kodansha's seinen manga magazine Weekly Young Magazine from November 1, 2014, to November 18, 2019. Kodansha collected its chapters in twenty-two tankōbon volumes, released from March 6, 2015, to June 5, 2020.

A sequel, titled The Fable: The Second Contact (ザ・ファブル The second contact), was serialized in Weekly Young Magazine from July 19, 2021, to July 10, 2023. Kodansha collected its chapters in nine tankōbon volumes, released from November 5, 2021, to November 6, 2023.

A third series, titled The Fable: The Third Secret (ザ・ファブル The third secret), began serialization in Weekly Young Magazine on March 17, 2025. Its first volume was released on June 6, 2025.

A spin-off, also titled The Fable, but written in hiragana (ざ・ふぁぶる) instead of katakana, was published on the Comic Days online platform from March 6, 2018, to February 26, 2019. A collected tankōbon, which also includes other stories by Minami, was published on June 5, 2020.

In March 2022, Kodansha USA announced they licensed the series for English publication.

== The Fable ==
No.	Original release date	Original ISBN	English release date	English ISBN
1	March 6, 2015	978-4-06-382563-3	April 12, 2022 (digital); April 9, 2024 (omnibus)	978-1-68-491116-5 (digital); 979-8-88-877244-7 (omnibus)
1. Moving (お引っ越し, O hikkoshi); 2. The Sato Siblings (佐藤兄妹, Satō kyōdai); 3. The Mob Boss & Captain (組長と若頭, Kumichō to wakagashira); 4. Setting In (新居にて, Shinkyo nite); 5. Rooftop Sniper (屋上のスナイパー, Okujō no sunaipā); 6. Jackal (ジャッカル, Jakkaru); 7. Champion (チャンピオン, Chanpion); 8. A Wonderful Night (素晴らしい夜, Subarashī yoru)
2	June 5, 2015	978-4-06-382613-5	May 10, 2022 (digital); April 9, 2024 (omnibus)	978-1-68-491167-7 (digital); 979-8-88-877244-7 (omnibus)
9. Boss's Orders (ボスの指令, Bosu no shirei); 10. Let's Go Shopping (お買い物に行こう, O kaimono ni ikō); 11. Tag (鬼ごっこ, Onigokko); 12. Let's Name It ♡ (名前をつけましょう, Namae o tsukemashō); 13. Two Invitations (ふたつのお誘い, Futa-tsu no o sasoi); 14. Treasures (宝物たち, Takaramono-tachi); 15. Ex-Wrestler (元レスラー, Moto resurā); 16. Hopes & Dreams (夢と希望, Yume to kibō); 17. Chatting About Life (命の話‥‥。, Inochi no hanashi‥‥.); 18. Cute Boy ♡ (カワイイ男の子, Kawaī otokonoko); 19. C'mon Takahashi ♡ (おいで高橋, O ide Takahashi)
3	September 4, 2015	978-4-06-382666-1	June 14, 2022 (digital); June 11, 2024 (omnibus)	978-1-68-491214-8 (digital); 979-8-88-877245-4 (omnibus)
20. Teen Drama (青春ドラマ‥‥。, Seishun dorama‥‥.); 21. New Jackal (新ジャッカル, Shin jakkaru); 22. A Man's Résumé (男の履歴書, Otoko no rireki-sho); 23. A Woman Named Misaki (ミサキという女, Misaki to yū onna); 24. You Listening to Me?! (聞いとんのかコラ‼, Kīton no ka kora‼); 25. Romantic ♪ (ロマンティック（音符）, Romantikku （onpu）); 26. Prison Release Jamboree (出所祝い, Dedokoro iwai); 27. Late-night Welcoming Party ♪ (夜の歓迎会（音符）, Yoru no kangei kai （onpu）); 28. Hungry Man ♡ (ハングリーな男（ハート）, Hangurī na otoko （hāto）); 29. Angry Man ♡ (アングリーな男（ハート）, Angurī na otoko（ hāto）); 30. In the Mountains (山の中‥‥。, Yama no naka‥‥.)
4	December 4, 2015	978-4-06-382713-2	July 12, 2022 (digital); June 11, 2024 (omnibus)	978-1-68-491345-9 (digital); 979-8-88-877245-4 (omnibus)
31. Kojima and Takahashi (小島と高橋, Kojima to Takahashi); 32. A Visit From a Man (アイサツに来た男, Aisatsu ni kita otoko); 33. Wuss (弱っちいヤツ, Yowacchī yatsu); 34. Because I'm Bored ♪ (おヒマなんだもの（音符）, O hima nanda mono （onpu）); 35. Realist ♡ (現実主義（ハート）, Genjitsu shugi （hāto）); 36. Let's Talk About Sex (SEXのお話‥‥。, SEX no o hanashi‥‥.); 37. Because I'm Bored Part Two ♪ (おヒマなんだものPART2（音符）, O hima nanda mono PART2 （onpu）); 38. Because I'm... You Know ♪ (だってだって、なんだもの（音符）, Datte datte, nanda mono （onpu）); 39. Let's Go Camping ♪ (キャンプしようよ（音符）, Kyanpu shiyō yo （onpu）); 40. Here, Mr. Lion ♡ (ライオンさん、いらっしゃい（ハート）, Raion-san, irasshai （hāto）); 41. Mucky Man (ぬかるみの男‥‥。, Nukarumi no otoko‥‥.)
5	March 4, 2016	978-4-06-382745-3	August 9, 2022 (digital); August 13, 2024 (omnibus)	978-1-68-491386-2 (digital); 979-8-88-877246-1 (omnibus)
42. It's About Business ♪ (ビジネスのお話です（音符）, Bijinesu no o hanashi desu （onpu）); 43. It's About Jazz ♪ (ジャズのお話です（音符）, Jazu no o hanashi desu （onpu）); 44. You Mean a Hitman...? (もしかして殺し屋‥‥。, Moshi ka shite koroshiya‥‥.); 45. Warehouse Man (倉庫の男‥‥。, Sōko no otoko‥‥.); 46. Hey, Sato! (おい佐藤ォ--‼, Oi Satō--!!); 47. The Man From Three Year Ago (3年ぶりの男‥‥。, 3 nen-buri no otoko‥‥.); 48. Sowwy ♪ (ゴメリンコ（音符）, Gomerinko （onpu）); 49. The Phantom of the Balcony (ベランダの怪人‥‥。, Beranda no kaijin‥‥.); 50. A Decent Man (まともな男‥‥。, Matomo na otoko‥‥.); 51. A Man Worth Killing (殺（や）りたい男‥‥。, Yaritai otoko‥‥.); 52. Barrel (銃身（バレル）--。, Jūshin （bareru）)
6	June 6, 2016	978-4-06-382796-5	September 13, 2022 (digital); August 13, 2024 (omnibus)	978-1-68-491432-6 (digital); 979-8-88-877246-1 (omnibus)
53. Yoko's Good Luck Charm ♪ (ヨウコのお守り（音符）, Yōko no o mamori （onpu）); 54. Tomorrow's the Big Day (明日という日‥‥。, Asu to yū hi‥ ‥ .); 55. The Fated Day ♪ (運命の一日です（音符）, Unmei no tsuitachi desu （onpu）); 56. An Unexpected Visitor (突然のお客人‥‥。, Totsuzen no o kyakujin‥‥.); 57. The Two-Story Foundry ♪ (二階建ての鉄工所（音符）, Ni kai-date no tekkō-sho （onpu）); 58. Ebihara-kun, Ebihara-kun ♪ (海老原くん、海老原くん（音符）, Ebihara-kun, Ebihara-kun （onpu）); 59. A Story About a Knife (ナイフのお話‥‥。, Naifu no o hanashi‥‥.); 60. Mosquito Noise ♪ (モスキート音（音符）, Mosukīto on （onpu）); 61. Amateurs and Pros ♪ (シロートとプロ（音符）, Shirōto to puro （onpu）); 62. White Smoke (白い煙‥‥。, Shiroi kemuri‥‥.); 63. There's Always Someone Better (上には上---。, Ue ni wa ue)
7	September 6, 2016	978-4-06-382847-4	October 11, 2022 (digital); November 5, 2024 (omnibus)	978-1-68-491477-7 (digital); 979-8-88-877247-8 (omnibus)
64. The Man in the Trunk (トランクの男‥‥。, Toranku no otoko‥‥.); 65. Unfinished Business (やるべき事‥‥。, Yarubeki koto‥‥.); 66. Aniki... Aniki... (アニキ‥‥アニキ‥‥。, Aniki‥‥ aniki‥‥.); 67. Believe it or Not, I'm... (これでも俺には‥‥。, Kore de mo ore ni wa‥‥.); 68. We're Even! (チャラや、チャラ‼, Chara ya, Chara‼); 69. Sensei, Sensei, Sensei ♪ (先生、先生、大先生（音符）, Sensei, sensei, dai sensei （onpu）); 70. Every One of 'Em (どいつもこいつも‥‥。, Doitsu mo koitsu mo‥‥.); 71. The Try-hard (必死すぎる男‥‥。, Hisshi sugiru otoko‥‥.); 72. I Love You, Nii-san! (好きです兄さん‼, Suki desu ani-san‼); 73. A Present From the Boss ♪ (ボスの贈り物（音符）, Bosu no okurimono （onpu）); 74. Survival Training? (もしかしてサバイバル‥‥。, Moshi ka shite sabaibaru‥‥.)
8	December 6, 2016	978-4-06-382887-0	November 8, 2022 (digital); November 5, 2024 (omnibus)	978-1-68-491535-4 (digital); 979-8-88-877247-8 (omnibus)
75. All-out Man (精一杯の男‥‥。, Sei ippai no otoko‥‥.); 76. Full Man (腹ごしらえの男‥‥。, Haragoshirae no otoko‥‥.); 77. Sad Man (泣きたい男‥‥。, Hakitai otoko‥‥.); 78. Tent Man (テントの男‥‥。, Tento no otoko‥‥.); 79. Riverside Man (川沿いの男‥‥。, Kawazoi no otoko‥‥.); 80. Dinner Man (食われる男‥‥。, Kuwareru otoko‥‥.); 81. Bobcut Man (断髪の男‥‥。, Danpatsu no otoko‥‥.); 82. Stiff Man (勃つ男‥‥。, Tatsu otoko‥‥.); 83. Hunched Man (前かがみな男‥‥。, Maekagami na otoko‥‥.); 84. Toyed Man (オモチャの男‥‥。, Omocha no otoko‥‥.); 85. Tequila Man (テキーラの男‥‥。, Tekīra no otoko‥‥.)
9	March 6, 2017	978-4-06-382932-7	December 6, 2022 (digital); December 10, 2024 (omnibus)	978-1-68-491584-2 (digital); 979-8-88-877248-5 (omnibus)
86. Lustful Man (ヤリたい男‥‥。, Yari tai otoko‥‥.); 87. Mountaineer Man (下山の男‥‥。, Gezan no otoko‥‥.); 88. Rei Utsubo (ウツボレイ‥‥。, Utsubo Rei‥‥.); 89. Tsutomu Isaki (イサキツトム‥‥。, Isaki Tsutomu‥‥.); 90. Hinako Saba (サバヒナコ‥‥。, Saba Hinako‥‥.); 91. Hiroshi Suzuki (スズキヒロシ‥‥。, Suzuki Hiroshi‥‥.); 92. Etsuji Kainuma (カイヌマエツジ‥‥。, Kainuma Etsuji‥‥.); 93. Kenji Kawahira (カワヒラケンジ‥‥。, Kawahira Kenji‥‥.); 94. Jigsaw Puzzle (ジグソーパズル‥‥。, Jigusō pazuru‥‥.); 95. Hood and Cord (フードとコート‥‥。, Fūdo to kōto‥‥.); 96. Cheerio (カンパイのパイ‥‥。, Kanpai no pai‥‥.)
10	June 6, 2017	978-4-06-382975-4	January 10, 2023 (digital); December 10, 2024 (omnibus)	978-1-68-491633-7 (digital); 979-8-88-877248-5 (omnibus)
97. Cock-A-Doodle-Doo (コケコッコー‥‥。, Kokekokkō‥‥.); 98. Brother and Sister (アニイモウト‥‥。, Aniimouto‥‥.); 99. Memory Card (メモリーカード‥‥。, Memorī kādo‥‥.); 100. Santa Claus (サンタクロース‥‥。, Santa Kurōsu‥‥.); 101. Dreamers (メルヘンちゃん‥‥。, Meruhen-chan‥‥.); 102. Delivery Man (配達員‥‥。, Haitatsu-in‥‥.); 103. Murphy's Law (マーフィの法則‥‥。, Māfi no hōsoku‥‥.); 104. The Kainuma Family (貝沼親子‥‥。, Kainuma oyako‥‥.); 105. Lies and Falsehoods (ウソと噓‥‥。, Uso to uso‥‥.); 106. A Humiliating Night (屈辱の夜‥‥。, Kutsujoku no yoru‥‥.); 107. A Malicious Morning (よからぬ朝‥‥。, Yokara nu asa‥‥.)
11	September 6, 2017	978-4-06-510154-4	February 14, 2023 (digital); February 11, 2025 (omnibus)	978-1-68-491695-5 (digital); 979-8-88-877249-2 (omnibus)
108. Clumsy Man (しくじりの男‥‥。, Shikujiri no otoko‥‥.); 109. 24 Hours (24時間‥‥。, 24 jikan‥‥.); 110. A Shady Visitor (怪しき来客‥‥。, Ayashiki raikyaku‥‥.); 111. Water and Tissues (水とティッシュ‥‥。, Mizu to Tisshu‥‥.); 112. Learning Man (教わる男‥‥。, Osowaru otoko‥‥.); 113. Fallen Man (落ちた男‥‥。, Ochita otoko‥‥.); 114. A Disappointing Night (残念な夜‥‥。, Zannen na yoru‥‥.); 115. Reindeer Man (トナカイの男‥‥。, Tonakai no otoko‥‥.); 116. Boys and Men (坊やと男たち‥‥。, Bōya to otoko-tachi‥‥.); 117. The ABCs of Villainy (悪党たちのABC‥‥。, Akutō-tachi no ABC‥‥.); 118. Takes One to Know One (蛇（じゃ）の道の男‥‥。, Ja no michi no otoko‥‥.)
12	December 6, 2017	978-4-06-510530-6	March 14, 2023 (digital); February 11, 2025 (omnibus)	978-1-68-491844-7 (digital); 979-8-88-877249-2 (omnibus)
119. Overmorrow Woman (あさっての女‥‥。, Asatte no onna‥‥.); 120. Planting Man (仕掛ける男‥‥。, Shikakeru otoko‥‥.); 121. Koichi Kawahira (カワヒラコウイチ‥‥。, Kawahira Kouichi‥‥.); 122. Doorstep Man (ドア前の男‥‥。, Doa mae no otoko‥‥.); 123. Convenience Store Man (コンビニの男‥‥。, Konbini no otoko‥‥.); 124. On the Forest Path (林道にて‥‥。, Rindō nite‥‥.); 125. Crawling Woman (這う女‥‥。, Hau onna‥‥.); 126. Horn (クラクション‥‥。, Kurakushon‥‥.); 127. Bastard (クソ野郎‥‥。, Kuso yarō‥‥.); 128. Starry Sky Lullaby (星空のララバイ‥‥。, Hoshizora no rarabai‥‥.); 129. Fast Man (速い男‥‥。, Hayai otoko‥‥.)
13	March 6, 2018	978-4-06-511090-4	April 11, 2023 (digital); April 1, 2025 (omnibus)	978-1-68-491884-3 (digital); 979-8-88-877250-8 (omnibus)
130. Prepared Man (備えし男‥‥。, Sonae shi otoko‥‥.); 131. Standing Woman (立つ女‥‥。, Tatsu onna‥‥.); 132. Afterwards Man (その後の男‥‥。, Sono ato no otoko‥‥.); 133. Disappearing Man (消える男‥‥。, Kieru otoko‥‥.); 134. Acting Man (演じる男‥‥。, Enjiru otoko‥‥.); 135. Christmas Butterflies ♪ (胸さわぎのクリスマス（音符）, Munasawagi no Kurisumasu （onpu）); 136. Holy Night Reindeer ♪ (聖夜のトナカイ（音符）, Seiya no tonakai （onpu）); 137. Santa's Sack ♪ (サンタの贈り物（音符）, Santa no okurimono （onpu）); 138. A Manly Xmas Battle ♪ (男たちのXmasバトル（音符）, Otoko-tachi no Xmas batoru （onpu）); 139. Holy Tequila Slammers ♪ (聖なるグビ・コン・チュ（音符）, Sei naru gubi kon chu （onpu）); 140. Uehhh! ♪ (ウィ～～ウィ～～（音符）, Wi～～ wi～～ （onpu）)
14	June 6, 2018	978-4-06-511622-7	May 9, 2023 (digital); April 1, 2025 (omnibus)	978-1-68-491935-2 (digital); 979-8-88-877250-8 (omnibus)
141. Curious Man (好奇心の男‥‥。, Kōki-shin no otoko‥‥.); 142. Beckoned Man (招かれし男‥‥。, Manekare shi otoko‥‥.); 143. Luger Man (ルガーの男‥‥。, Rugā no otoko‥‥.); 144. Hammock Man (ハンモックの男‥‥。, Hanmokku no otoko‥‥.); 145. Year End Man (年の瀬の男‥‥。, Toshinose no otoko‥‥.); 146. Brother vs. Sister, Part One (兄vs.妹、其の一‥‥。, Ani vs. imōto, sono ichi‥‥.); 147. Brother vs. Sister, Part Two (兄vs.妹、其の二‥‥。, Ani vs. imōto, sono ni‥‥.); 148. Brother vs. Sister, Part Three (兄vs.妹、其の三‥‥。, Ani vs. imōto, sono san‥‥.); 149. New Year's Eve Man (年越しの男‥‥。, Toshikoshi no otoko‥‥.); 150. New Year's Day Man (元旦の男‥‥。, Gantan no otoko‥‥.); 151. New Year's Woman (お正月明けの女‥‥。, O shōgatsu ake no onna‥ ‥ .)
15	September 6, 2018	978-4-06-512822-0	June 13, 2023 (digital); June 10, 2025 (omnibus)	978-1-68-491964-2 (digital); 979-8-88-877251-5 (omnibus)
152. Homeowner Man (一軒家の男‥‥。, Ichi-ken-ka no otoko‥‥.); 153. Peanut Man (落花生の男‥‥。, Rakka-sei no otoko‥‥.); 154. Memories of a Little Girl (少女の記憶‥‥。, Shōjo no kioku‥‥.); 155. Producer Man (プロデューサーの男‥‥。, Purodyūsā no otoko‥‥.); 156. Traumatized Man (トラウマの男‥‥。, Torauma no otoko‥‥.); 157. One Quiet Night (ヒトヨノデキゴト‥‥。, Hitoyonodekigoto‥‥.); 158. Steakhouse Man (鉄板焼きの男‥‥。, Teppan-yaki no otoko‥‥.); 159. The Magician's Reveal (タネあかしの男‥‥。, Tane akashi no otoko‥‥.); 160. Tapping Man (トントンする男‥‥。, Tonton suru otoko‥‥.); 161. Hamburger Man (ハンバーガーの男‥‥。, Hanbāgā no otoko‥‥.); 162. Wooed Man (口説かれる男‥‥。, Kudokareru otoko‥‥.)
16	December 6, 2018	978-4-06-513841-0	July 11, 2023 (digital); June 10, 2025 (omnibus)	979-8-88-933031-8 (digital); 979-8-88-877251-5 (omnibus)
163. Japan Man (日本の男‥‥。, Nippon no otoko‥‥.); 164. Fondled Man (揉まれる男‥‥。, Momareru otoko‥‥.); 165. The Man from Back Then (あの時の男‥‥。, Ano toki no otoko‥‥.); 166. Named Man (名づけられし男‥‥。, Nazukerare shi otoko‥‥.); 167. Messenger from Hell (地獄からの使者‥‥。, Jigoku kara no shisha‥‥.); 168. Raid Man (カチコミの男‥‥。, Kachikomi no otoko‥‥.); 169. Carrot and Stick Man (アメとムチの男‥‥。, Ame to muchi no otoko‥‥.); 170. Billiards Man (球撞きの男‥‥。, Tama tsuki no otoko‥‥.); 171. Frisky Man (SEXしたい男‥‥。, SEX shitai otoko‥‥.); 172. Cragsman (登山家の男‥‥。, Tozan-ka no otoko‥‥.); 173. 100 Grand in 15 Minutes Man (15分10万円の男‥‥。, 15 fun 10 man en no otoko‥‥.)
17	March 6, 2019	978-4-06-515397-0	August 8, 2023 (digital); August 12, 2025 (omnibus)	979-8-88-933092-9 (digital); 979-8-88-877252-2 (omnibus)
174. Playful Man (戯れる男‥‥。, Tawamureru otoko‥‥.); 175. Gifted Man (贈られし男‥‥。, Okurare shi otoko‥‥.); 176. The Man from That Day (その日の男‥‥。, Sono hi no otoko‥‥.); 177. Distressed Woman (乱れる女‥‥。, Midareru onna‥‥.); 178. Rewrite Man (リテイクの男‥‥。, Riteiku no otoko‥‥.); 179. Jumpy Woman (ピクッとくる女‥‥。, Pikutto kuru onna‥‥.); 180. Unyielding Man (筋金入りの男‥‥。, Sujigane-iri no otoko‥‥.); 181. Bargaining Man (掛け合う男‥‥。, Kakeau otoko‥‥.); 182. Bargaining Woman (掛け合う女‥‥。, Kakeau onna‥‥.); 183. Stealthy Woman (忍び込む女‥‥。, Shinobikomu onna‥‥.); 184. Envious Man (なってみたい男‥‥。, Natte mitai otoko‥‥.)
18	June 6, 2019	978-4-06-516126-5	September 12, 2023 (digital); August 12, 2025 (omnibus)	979-8-88-933139-1 (digital); 979-8-88-877252-2 (omnibus)
185. Fairy Tale Man (おとぎ話の男‥‥。, Otogibanashi no otoko‥‥.); 186. Liberated Man (解かれる男‥‥。, Tokareru otoko‥‥.); 187. No-Going-Back Man (戻らない男‥‥。, Modoranai otoko‥‥.); 188. Distraught Man (狼狽える男‥‥。, Urotaeru otoko‥‥.); 189. New Guy (新入りの男‥‥。, Shin'iri no otoko‥‥.); 190. Assault Woman (攻める女‥‥。, Semeru onna‥‥.); 191. Acting Man (怪演の男‥‥。, Kaien no otoko‥‥.); 192. Unforgivable Man (許せない男‥‥。, Yurusenai otoko‥‥.); 193. Resisting Duo (抗う二人‥‥。, Aragau futari‥‥.); 194. First Meeting Man (初対面の男‥‥。, Hatsu taimen no otoko‥‥.); 195. Masterpiece Man (最高傑作の男‥‥。, Saikō kessaku no otoko‥‥.)
19	September 6, 2019	978-4-06-516938-4	October 10, 2023 (digital); October 7, 2025 (omnibus)	979-8-88-933181-0 (digital); 979-8-88-877253-9 (omnibus)
196. Air Man (空気の男‥‥。, Kūki no otoko‥‥.); 197. Wrapped Man (包まれし男‥‥。, Tsutsumare shi otoko‥‥.); 198. Fleeing Man (逃げる男‥‥。, Nigeru otoko‥‥.); 199. Flying Man (飛ぶ男‥‥。, Tobu otoko‥‥.); 200. Sinking Man (沈む男‥‥。, Shizumu otoko‥‥.); 201. Sleeping Woman (眠る女‥‥。, Nemuru onna‥‥.); 202. Woman Who Knows Too Much (知りすぎた女‥‥。, Shirisugita onna‥‥.); 203. Angry Man (怒れる男‥‥。, Okoreru otoko‥‥.); 204. Lonely Man (天涯孤独の男‥‥。, Tengai kodoku no otoko‥‥.); 205. Friend Man (友達の男‥‥。, Tomodachi no otoko‥‥.); 206. Massage Chair Man (マッサージチェアの男‥‥。, Massāji chea no otoko‥‥.)
20	December 6, 2019	978-4-06-517853-9	November 14, 2023 (digital); October 7, 2025 (omnibus)	979-8-88-933269-5 (digital); 979-8-88-877253-9 (omnibus)
207. Leaving Man (出て行く男‥‥。, Dete iku otoko‥‥.); 208. Amused Man (楽しそうな男‥‥。, Tanoshi sō na otoko‥‥.); 209. Stethoscope Man (聴診器の男‥‥。, Chōshin-ki no otoko‥‥.); 210. Lonesome Man (ひとりぽっちの男‥‥。, Hitori-pocchi no otoko‥‥.); 211. Fierce Man (渋すぎる男‥‥。, Shibu sugiru otoko‥‥.); 212. Remembering Woman (思い出す女‥‥。, Omoidasu onna‥‥.); 213. Pleading Woman (願う女‥‥。, Negau onna‥‥.); 214. Curry Rice Night (カレーライスの夜‥‥。, Karei raisu no yoru‥‥.); 215. AA Battery Man (単三電池の男‥‥。, Tansan denchi no otoko‥‥.); 216. Accident Man (お漏らしの男‥‥。, Omorashi no otoko‥‥.); 217. Three Steps Forward Man (三歩前の男‥‥。, San ho mae no otoko‥‥.)
21	March 6, 2020	978-4-06-518813-2	December 12, 2023 (digital); December 9, 2025 (omnibus)	979-8-88-933288-6 (digital); 979-8-88-877254-6 (omnibus)
218. Deceitful Man (欺く男‥‥。, Azamuku otoko‥‥.); 219. Dessert Men (デザートの男たち‥‥。, Dezāto no otoko-tachi‥‥.); 220. Tired Man (疲れた男‥‥。, Tsukareta otoko‥‥.); 221. Proposing Woman (申し出る女‥‥。, Mōshideru onna‥‥.); 222. Goosebumps Man (鳥肌の男‥‥。, Torihada no otoko‥‥.); 223. Landline Man (固定電話の男‥‥。, Kotei denwa no otoko‥‥.); 224. Mixed-Up Man (複雑な男‥‥。, Fukuzatsu na otoko‥‥.); 225. 8-Point Man (8点の男‥‥。, 8 ten no otoko‥‥.); 226. Preparing Man (お膳立ての男‥‥。, O zendate no otoko‥‥.); 227. Resolved Man (覚悟の男‥‥。, Kakugo no otoko‥‥.); 228. Hair Clippers Man (バリカンの男‥‥。, Barikan no otoko‥‥.)
22	June 5, 2020	978-4-06-519984-8	January 9, 2024 (digital); December 9, 2025 (omnibus)	979-8-88-933321-0 (digital); 979-8-88-877254-6 (omnibus)
229. Downed Man (寝転ぶ男‥‥。, Nekorobu otoko‥‥.); 230. Felt Man (ラシャの男‥‥。, Rasha no otoko‥‥.); 231. Tent Man (テントの男‥‥。, Tento no otoko‥‥.); 232. Collapsing Man (崩れゆく男‥‥。, Kuzureyuku otoko‥‥.); 233. Driver Man (運転手の男‥‥。, Unten-shu no otoko‥‥.); 234. Leader Man (上に立つ男‥‥。, Ue ni tatsu otoko‥‥.); 235. Something to Say Man (話がある男‥‥。, Hanashi ga aru otoko‥‥.); 236. Heaven Man (天国の男‥‥。, Tengoku no otoko‥‥.); 237. Father Man (父親の男‥‥。, Chichioya no otoko‥‥.); 238. Farewell Man (お別れの男‥‥。, O wakare no otoko‥‥.); 239. Embarking Man (旅立つ男‥‥。, Tabidatsu otoko‥‥.); 240. Normal Man (ふつうの男‥‥。, Futsū no otoko‥‥.)

== The Fable: The Second Contact ==
No.	Release date	ISBN
1	November 5, 2021	978-4-06-525838-5
1. Thank-You Man (ありがとうの男‥‥。, Arigatō no otoko‥‥.); 2. Chance Encounter Man (一期一会の男‥‥。, Ichi ki ichie no otoko‥‥.); 3. Initiate Woman (直伝の女‥‥。, Jikiden no onna‥‥.); 4. 3D Puzzle Woman (立体パズルの女‥‥。, Rittai pazuru no onna‥‥.); 5. Commentator Man (コメンテーターの男‥‥。, Komenteitā no otoko‥‥.); 6. Honeymoon Mode Man (新婚ボケの男‥‥。, Shinkon boke no otoko‥‥.); 7. Retaliating Man (動き出す男‥‥。, Ugokidasu otoko‥‥.)
2	February 4, 2022	978-4-06-526825-4
8. Attic Man (屋根裏の男‥‥。, Yaneura no otoko‥‥.); 9. Ex-Boyfriend Man (元カレの男‥‥。, Motokare no otoko‥‥.); 10. Deliberating Man (案ずる男‥‥。, Anzuru otoko‥‥.); 11. Exhausted Woman (力尽きた女‥‥。, Chikara tsukita onna‥‥.); 12. Artsy Man (芸術な男‥‥。, Geijutsu na otoko‥‥.); 13. Fly-by Man (あっという間の男‥‥。, Atto yū ma no otoko‥‥.); 14. Canned Sardine Men (いわし缶の男たち‥‥。, Iwashi kan no otoko-tachi‥‥.); 15. Bases Loaded Men (満塁の男たち‥‥。, Manrui no otoko-tachi‥‥.); 16. Self-Responsible Man (自己責任の男‥‥。, Jiko sekinin no otoko‥‥.); 17. Jinxed Man (疫病神の男‥‥。, Yakubyō kami no otoko‥‥.)
3	May 6, 2022	978-4-06-527794-2
18. Rental Uncle Woman (レンタルおっちゃんの女‥‥。, Rentaru occhan no onna‥‥.); 19. Leaving Woman (出てゆく女‥‥。, Dete yuku onna‥‥.); 20. Rumor Man (ルーマーの男‥‥。, Rūmā no otoko‥‥.); 21. Infiltrating Woman (潜り込む女‥‥。, Mogurikomu onna‥‥.); 22. Buzzing People (騒めく人々‥‥。, Zawameku hitobito‥‥.); 23. Thinking Man (考える男‥‥。, Kangaeru otoko‥‥.); 24. News Men (ニュースな男たち‥‥。, Nyūsu na otoko-tachi‥‥.); 25. Balance Art Man (バランスアートの男‥‥。, Baransu āto no otoko‥‥.); 26. Nude Woman (ヌードの女‥‥。, Nūdo no onna‥‥.); 27. Rathole Man (ゴミ屋敷の男‥‥。, Gomiyashiki no otoko‥‥.)
4	August 5, 2022	978-4-06-528811-5
28. Self-Centered Man (好きにする男‥‥。, Suki ni suru otoko‥‥.); 29. Tailed People (尾けられし者‥‥。, Tsukerare shi mono‥‥.); 30. "That Face" Man (あの顔の男‥‥。, Ano kao no otoko‥‥.); 31. Full Course Man (フルコースの男‥‥。, Furu kōsu no otoko‥‥.); 32. Third-Rate Man (三流らしき男‥‥。, San-ryū rashiki otoko‥‥.); 33. Rule Breaker man (ルール違反の男‥‥。, Rūru ihan no otoko‥‥.); 34. Wig Man (カツラの男‥‥。, Katsura no otoko‥‥.); 35. Quirky Man (クセの悪い男‥‥。, Kuse no warui otoko‥‥.); 36. Deja vu Man (デジャブの男‥‥。, Dejabu no otoko‥‥.); 37. P.O.S. Man (クソみたいな男‥‥。, Kuso mitai na otoko‥‥.)
5	November 4, 2022	978-4-06-529751-3
38. Initiative Man (主導権の男‥‥。, Shudō-ken no otoko‥‥.); 39. Silent Man (無音の男‥‥。, Muon no otoko‥‥.); 40. Smirking Man (ニヤニヤする男‥‥。, Niyaniya suru otoko‥‥.); 41. Stereo Man (ラジカセの男‥‥。, Rajikase no otoko‥‥.); 42. Smirking Man Cont. (続ニヤニヤする男‥‥。, Zoku niyaniya suru otoko‥‥.); 43. Jogging Man (ジョギングの男‥‥。, Jogingu no otoko‥‥.); 44. First-Timer Man (初めて来た男‥‥。, Hajimete kita otoko‥‥.); 45. Discerning Man (わかりやすい男‥‥。, Wakari yasui otoko‥‥.); 46. Indifferent Man (無関心な男‥‥。, Mu kanshin na otoko‥‥.); 47. Handshake Man (握手する男‥‥。, Akushu suru otoko‥‥.)
6	February 6, 2023	978-4-06-530708-3
48. Uninvited Man (招かざる男‥‥。, Manekazaru otoko‥‥.); 49. Darkness Man (暗がりの男‥‥。, Kuragari no otoko‥‥.); 50. Well-Intentioned Man (悪気のない男‥‥。, Warugi no nai otoko‥‥.); 51. Handpicking Man (厳選する男‥‥。, Gensen suru otoko‥‥.); 52. Serious Man (本気の男‥‥。, Honki no otoko‥‥.); 53. Reliable Man (頼もしい男‥‥。, Tanomoshī otoko‥‥.); 54. Targeted Man (狙われる男‥‥。, Nerawareru otoko‥‥.); 55. Cute Woman (カワイイ女‥‥。, Kawaī onna‥‥.); 56. Disappearing Man (消えた男‥‥。, Kieta otoko‥‥.); 57. Black-eyed Woman (黒い目の女‥‥。, Kuroi me no onna‥‥.)
7	May 8, 2023	978-4-06-531689-4
58. Full Stop Man (寸止めの男‥‥。, Sundome no otoko‥‥.); 59. Well-Intentioned Man Cont. (続・悪気のない男‥‥。, Zoku. warugi no nai otoko‥‥.); 60. Unusual Man (珍しい男‥‥。, Mezurashī otoko‥‥.); 61. For Now Man (とりあえずの男‥‥。, Toriaezu no otoko‥‥.); 62. Cortisol Man (コルチゾールの男‥‥。, Koruchizōru no otoko‥‥.); 63. Tunnel Vision Man (トンネル視野の男‥‥。, Tonneru shiya no otoko‥‥.); 64. Unmasked Man (マスクを取る男‥‥。, Masuku o toru otoko‥‥.); 65. Inkling Man (ムズがゆい男‥‥。, Mu zu ga yui otoko‥‥.); 66. Cardboard Box Man (ダンボールの男‥‥。, Dan bōru no otoko‥‥.); 67. Bothered Man (引っかかる男‥‥。, Hikkakaru otoko‥‥.)
8	August 4, 2023	978-4-06-532657-2
68. Impatient Woman (帰りたい女‥‥。, Kaeritai onna‥‥.); 69. Additional Fee Man (追加料金の男‥‥。, Tsuika ryōkin no otoko‥‥.); 70. 40-second Woman (40秒の女‥‥。, 40 byō no onna‥‥.); 71. "That Line" Man (そのセリフの男‥‥。, Sono serifu no otoko‥‥.); 72. Lame Man (カッコ悪い男‥‥。, Kakko warui otoko‥‥.); 73. Promising Man (約束する男‥‥。, Yakusoku suru otoko‥‥.); 74. Loud Man (声がデカい男‥‥。, Koe ga dekai otoko‥‥.); 75. Silly Girl (バカバカしい女‥‥。, Bakabakashī onna‥‥.); 76. Sliding Man (滑りおりる男‥‥。, Suberioriru otoko‥‥.); 77. Former Sibling Man (兄弟だった男‥‥。, Kyōdai datta otoko‥‥.)
9	November 6, 2023	978-4-06-533625-0
78. The Men Left Behind (残されし男たち‥‥。, Nokosare shi otoko-tachi‥‥.); 79. Water Fountain Man (水飲み場の男‥‥。, Mizunomi ba no otoko‥‥.); 80. Sorry Man (申し訳ない男‥‥。, Mōshiwake nai otoko‥‥.); 81. Monitor Man (モニター越しの男‥‥。, Monitā-goshi no otoko‥‥.); 82. Homecoming Man (ただいまの男‥‥。, Tadaima no otoko‥‥.); 83. Scratched Man (かすり傷の男‥‥。, Kasurikizu no otoko‥‥.); 84. Fed Up Man (限界の男‥‥。, Genkai no otoko‥‥.); 85. Entrusting Man (委ねる男‥‥。, Yudaneru otoko‥‥.); 86. Experiencing Man (経験する男‥‥。, Keiken suru otoko‥‥.)

== The Fable: The Third Secret ==
No.	Release date	ISBN
1	June 6, 2025	978-4-06-539858-6
1. Masked Man (仮面の男‥‥。, Kamen no otoko‥‥.); 2. Whistling Man (口笛の男‥‥。, Kuchibue no otoko‥‥.); 3. Evolving Man (進化する男‥‥。, Shinka suru otoko‥‥.); 4. 30 Years Later Man (30年ぶりの男‥‥。, Sanjūnen buri no otoko‥‥.); 5. Luxury Watch Man (高級時計の男‥‥。, Kōkyū tokei no otoko‥‥.); 6. Man Once Called "Ant" (アリと呼ばれた男‥‥。, Ari to yobareta otoko‥‥.); 7. Weather Prediction Man (天気予報の男‥‥。, Tenki yohō no otoko‥‥.)
2	September 9, 2025	978-4-06-540871-1
8. Useful Man (役に立つ男‥‥。, Yaku ni tatsu otoko‥‥.); 9. Remembering Man (思い出す男‥‥。, Omoidasu otoko‥‥.); 10. Hostess Club Man (キャバクラの男‥‥。, Kyabakura no otoko‥‥.); 11. Self-sufficient Man (自給自足の男‥‥。, Jikyū jisoku no otoko‥‥.); 12. Fated Man (運命の男‥‥。, Unmei no otoko‥‥.); 13. Picture Diary Man (絵日記の男‥‥。, E nikki no otoko‥‥.); 14. Menacing Man (脅威の男‥‥。, Kyōi no otoko‥‥.); 15. Woman Living in the Now (今を生きる女‥‥。, Ima o ikiru onna‥‥.); 16. Overzealous Man (ピーヒャラの男‥‥。, Pīhyara no otoko‥‥.); 17. Practical Woman (実戦的な女‥‥。, Jissen-teki na onna‥‥.)
3	December 5, 2025	978-4-06-541766-9
18. Sobbing Man (咽び泣く男‥‥。, Musebi naku otoko‥‥.); 19. Foolish Man (愚か者の男‥‥。, Orokamono no otoko‥‥.); 20. Opportunist Man (どさくさの男‥‥。, Dosakusa no otoko‥‥.); 21. Censoring Man (モザイク処理の男‥‥。, Mozaiku shori no otoko‥‥.); 22. Family Woman (ファミリーの女‥‥。, Famirī no onna‥‥.); 23. Runaway Man (走り去る男‥‥。, Hashirisaru otoko‥‥.); 24. Head-on Man (正面突破の男‥‥。, Shōmen toppa no otoko‥‥.); 25. Settling Man (カタをつける男‥‥。, Kata o tsukeru otoko‥‥.); 26. Champion Man (チャンピオンの男‥‥。, Chanpion no otoko‥‥.); 27. Hamburger Woman (ハンバーグの女‥‥。, Hanbāgu no onna‥‥.)
4	April 6, 2026	978-4-06-543200-6
28. Betrayed Man (裏切られた男‥‥。, Uragirareta otoko‥‥.); 29. Wanted Man (指名手配の男‥‥。, Shimei tehai no otoko‥‥.); 30. Red-handed Man (現行犯の男‥‥。, Genkōhan no otoko‥‥.); 31. Speakerphone Man (スピーカーの男‥‥。, Supīkā no otoko‥‥.); 32. Fleeing Man (逃げ込んだ男‥‥。, Nigekonda otoko‥‥.); 33. Finland Man (フィンランドの男‥‥。, Finrando no otoko‥‥.); 34. Sorry Man (ごめんなさいの男‥‥。, Gomennasai no otoko‥‥.); 35. Choked Up Man (「うっ」となる男‥‥。, "U〜" to naru otoko‥‥.); 36. Weapon of Choice Man (獲物の男‥‥。, Emono no otoko‥‥.); 37. Owazamono Man (大業物の男‥‥。, Ōwazamono no otoko‥‥.)
5	July 6, 2026	978-4-06-544249-4
38. Fill-in Man (代役の男‥‥。, Daiyaku no otoko‥‥.); 39. At Peace Man (安らかなる男‥‥。, Yasurakanaru otoko‥‥.); 40. First Job Man (初仕事の男‥‥。, Hatsu shigoto no otoko‥‥.); 41. Cup Ramen Man (カップメンの男‥‥。, Kappu men no otoko‥‥.); 42. United Men (結束する男‥‥。, Kessoku suru otoko‥‥.); 43. Moon-Viewing Man (月を見る男‥‥。, Tsuki o miru otoko‥‥.); 44. Family Man (ファミリーの男‥‥。, Famirī no otoko‥‥.); 45. Takoyaki Man (タコ焼きの男‥‥。, Takoyaki no otoko‥‥.); 46. Hunting-Loving Man (狩猟好きの男‥‥。, Shuryō-suki no otoko‥‥.); 47. Investing Man (先行投資の男‥‥。, Senkō tōshi no otoko‥‥.)
6	November 6, 2026	978-4-06-545203-5
48. Skirt Steak Man (上ハラミの男‥‥。, Ue harami no otoko‥‥.); 49. Wakizashi Man (脇差しの男‥‥。, Wakizashi no otoko‥‥.); 50. Not-Playing Man (ごっこじゃねえ男‥‥。, Gokko janē otoko‥‥.); 51. Waking Man (お目覚めの男‥‥。, O mezame no otoko‥‥.); 52. Eye Mask Man (アイマスクの男‥‥。, Aimasuku no otoko‥‥.); 53. Looked-for Man (捜していた男‥‥。, Sagashiteita otoko‥‥.); 54. Swept Up Man (流れの中の男‥‥。, Nagare no naka no otoko‥‥.); 55. Sense-Making Man (合点がいく男‥‥。, Gatengaiku otoko‥‥.); 56. Dash cam Man (ドラレコの男‥‥。, Dorareko no otoko‥‥.); 57. Distracted Man (心ここにあらずの男‥‥。, Kokorokokoniarazu no otoko‥‥.)

=== Chapters not yet in tankōbon format ===
- 58. Send-off Man (お見送りの男‥‥。, O miokuri no otoko‥‥.)
- 59. 2:00 a.m. Man (午前2時の男‥‥。, Gozen niji no otoko‥‥.)
