= Sabu (director) =

Japanese actor and film director

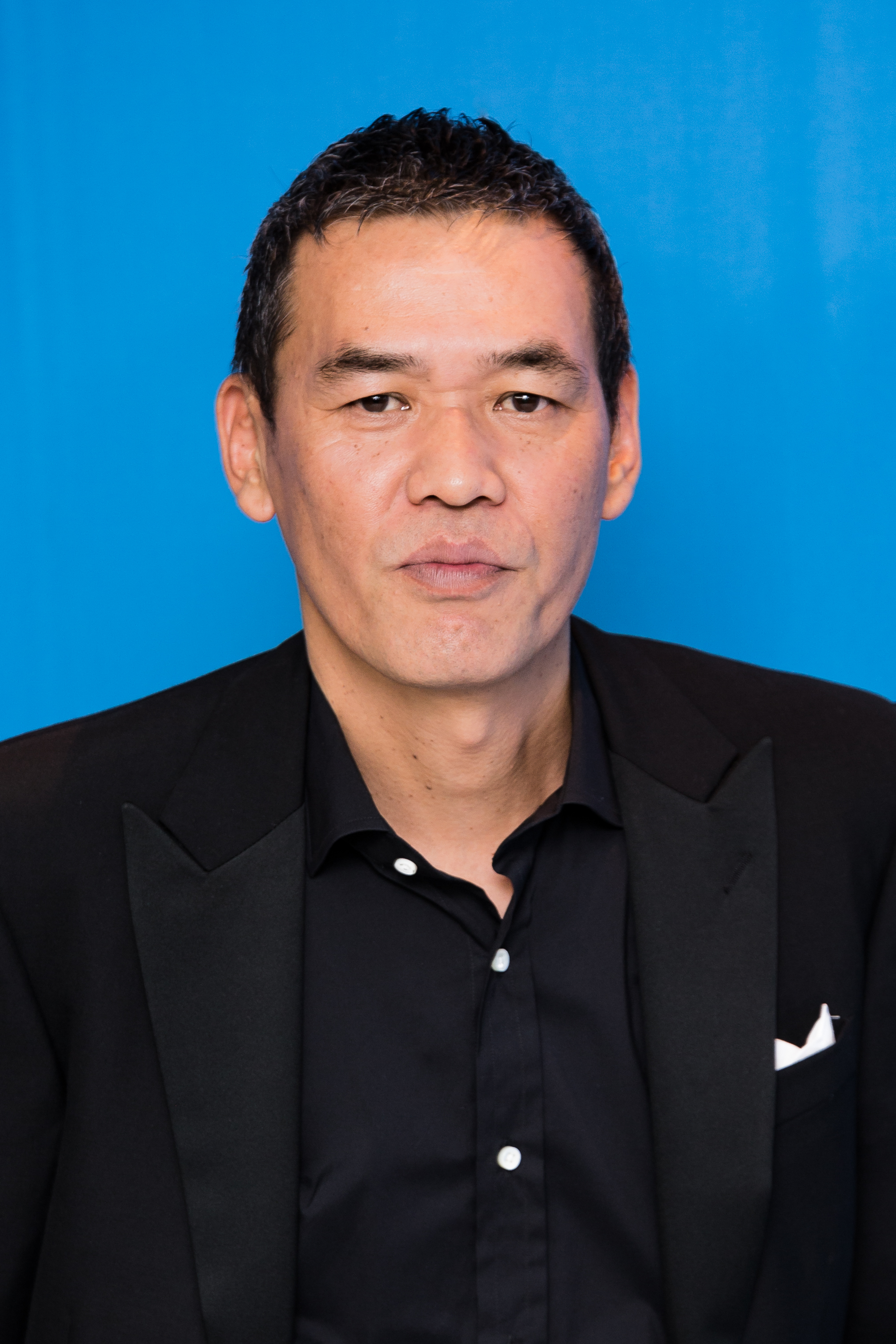
- Sabu at the Berlinale 2017
- Born: November 18, 1964 (age 61); Wakayama, Wakayama, Japan
- Occupations: Film director and actor
- Years active: 1986–present

Hiroyuki Tanaka (田中博行, Tanaka Hiroyuki; born November 18, 1964), known professionally as Sabu (サブ), is a Japanese actor and film director.

== Career ==
Born in Wakayama Prefecture, Sabu studied at an Osaka fashion school before deciding to go to Tokyo to become a professional musician. It was suggested he try acting and in 1986 he made his film debut in Sorobanzuku. He earned his first starring role in the 1991 World Apartment Horror, a live-action film directed by Katsuhiro Ōtomo of Akira fame. Working from a script he wrote himself, he made his directorial debut with the 1996 Dangan Runner, a film that set his early style of "quirky action-comedies propelled by characters who hurtle headlong though squirming narratives steered more by the forces of incidence and coincidence than the actions of the protagonists themselves." Shin'ichi Tsutsumi played the lead in Sabu's first five films. Blessing Bell, starring Susumu Terajima (who has played minor roles in nearly all of Sabu's films), was a turn away from his kinetic, parodic, and black comedy narratives, and earned the NETPAC Award at the 2003 Berlin Film Festival. Later films featured the J-pop band V6. In 2009, he directed The Crab Cannery Ship, a modern adaptation of a classic of Japanese proletarian literature written by Takiji Kobayashi.

He has continued to work as an actor, such as in Takashi Miike's Ichi the Killer (2001).

His film Chasuke's Journey was selected to be screened in the main competition section of the 65th Berlin International Film Festival.

== Selected filmography ==
=== Director ===
- Dangan Runner (1996)
- Postman Blues (1997)
- Unlucky Monkey (1998)
- Monday (2000)
- Drive (2002)
- Blessing Bell (2002)
- A1012K (2003, short film)
- Hard Luck Hero (2003)
- Hold-Up Down (2005)
- Dead Run (2005)
- The Crab Cannery Ship (2009)
- Troubleman (2010, TV Series)
- Bunny Drop (2011)
- Miss Zombie (2013)
- Chasuke's Journey (2015)
- Happiness (2016)
- Mr. Long (2017)
- Jam (2018)
- Dancing Mary (2020)
- My Blood & Bones in a Flowing Galaxy (2021)
- Arrested Memory (2026)

=== Actor ===
- Sorobanzuku (1986)
- World Apartment Horror (1991)
- Zeiram 2 (1994)
- 800 Two Lap Runners (1994)
- Dangan Runner (1996)
- Katte ni Shiyagare!! Gyakuten Keikaku (1996)
- Ghost Actress (1996)
- Postman Blues (1997)
- Ichi the Killer (2001)
- Josee, the Tiger and the Fish (2003)
- Silence (2016)
