= List of 2008 box office number-one films in Japan =

This is a list of films which have placed number one at the weekend box office in Japan during 2008.

== Number-one films ==
†	This implies the highest-grossing movie of the year.

#	Weekend End Date	Film	Total Weekend Gross	Notes
1	January 5, 2008	I Am Legend	$12,197,521	
2	January 10, 2008	Earth	$12,937,019	
3	January 17, 2008	Sweeney Todd: The Demon Barber of Fleet Street	$13,081,702	
4	January 24, 2008	Sweeney Todd: The Demon Barber of Fleet Street	$12,588,158	
5	February 2, 2008	Flowers in the Shadows	$12,554,132	
6	February 9, 2008	L: Change the World	$17,311,424	
7	February 16, 2008	L: Change the World	$12,470,414	
8	February 23, 2008	L: Change the World	$8,889,317	
9	March 2, 2008	The Golden Compass	$16,474,214	
10	March 9, 2008	Doraemon: Nobita and the Green Giant Legend	$22,284,149	
11	March 15, 2008	Enchanted	$18,343,724	
12	March 21, 2008	Doraemon: Nobita and the Green Giant Legend	$13,650,557	
13	March 28, 2008	Doraemon: Nobita and the Green Giant Legend	$13,227,796	
14	April 4, 2008	Cloverfield	$19,855,502	
15	April 11, 2008	Kamen Rider Den-O & Kiva: Climax Deka	$11,356,771	
16	April 20, 2008	Detective Conan: Full Score of Fear	$13,995,598	
17	April 27, 2008	Detective Conan: Full Score of Fear	$13,348,183	
18	May 4, 2008	Aibou the Movie	$20,879,182	
19	May 9, 2008	Aibou the Movie	$13,690,019	
20	May 17, 2008	Aibou the Movie	$10,075,036	
21	May 23, 2008	The Chronicles of Narnia: Prince Caspian	$15,412,251	
22	May 31, 2008	The Chronicles of Narnia: Prince Caspian	$15,396,631	
23	June 6, 2008	The Magic Hour	$13,004,887	
24	June 13, 2008	The Magic Hour	$8,723,423	
25	June 19, 2008	Indiana Jones and the Kingdom of the Crystal Skull	$22,092,307	
26	June 30, 2008	Boys Over Flowers: Final	$21,687,765	
27	July 6, 2008	Boys Over Flowers: Final	$16,676,364	
28	July 13, 2008	Boys Over Flowers: Final	$15,716,531	
29	July 20, 2008	Ponyo on the Cliff by the Sea †	$27,691,332	
30	July 25, 2008	Ponyo on the Cliff by the Sea †	$22,996,575	
31	August 3, 2008	Ponyo on the Cliff by the Sea †	$20,886,162	
32	August 8, 2008	Ponyo on the Cliff by the Sea †	$20,320,906	
33	August 17, 2008	Ponyo on the Cliff by the Sea †	$26,631,227	
34	August 24, 2008	Ponyo on the Cliff by the Sea †	$20,845,771	
35	August 29, 2008	Hancock	$27,853,706	
36	September 5, 2008	Twentieth Century Boys: Chapter One	$17,538,734	
37	September 13, 2008	Twentieth Century Boys: Chapter One	$18,501,519	
38	September 19, 2008	Wanted	$20,677,066	
39	September 26, 2008	Iron Man	$13,857,807	
40	October 3, 2008	Suspect X	$16,630,221	
41	October 11, 2008	Suspect X	$13,529,062	
42	October 17, 2008	Suspect X	$11,125,800	
43	October 26, 2008	Suspect X	$13,852,440	
44	November 1, 2008	Red Cliff: Part I	$19,972,550	
45	November 8, 2008	Red Cliff: Part I	$13,185,408	
46	November 14, 2008	Red Cliff: Part I	$11,411,006	
47	November 21, 2008	Red Cliff: Part I	$12,378,448	
48	November 30, 2008	Red Cliff: Part I	$9,333,496	
49	December 5, 2008	WALL-E	$14,082,484	
50	December 13, 2008	WALL-E	$14,568,768	
51	December 21, 2008	The Day the Earth Stood Still	$16,422,078	
52	December 26, 2008	WALL-E	$10,994,087	

== Highest-grossing films ==
International film Japanese film

Highest-grossing films of 2008
Rank	Title	Gross
1	Ponyo	¥15.50 billion ($149.96 million)
2	Boys Over Flowers: The Movie	¥7.75 billion ($74.98 million)
3	Indiana Jones and the Kingdom of the Crystal Skull	¥5.71 billion ($55.24 million)
4	Red Cliff: Part I	¥5.05 billion ($48.86 million)
5	Suspect X	¥4.92 billion ($47.6 million)
6	Pokémon: Giratina & the Sky Warrior	¥4.80 billion ($46.44 million)
7	Partners: The Movie	¥4.44 billion ($42.96 million)
8	I Am Legend	¥4.31 billion ($41.7 million)
9	20th Century Boys: Chapter 1	¥3.95 billion ($38.22 million)
10	The Magic Hour	¥3.92 billion ($37.93 million)
