= Dangan Runner =

- Film poster
- Directed by: Sabu
- Written by: Sabu
- Produced by: Masaya Nakamura
- Starring: Shinichi Tsutsumi; Tomorowo Taguchi; Diamond Yukai; Akaji Maro; Ren Osugi
- Cinematography: Shuji Kuriyama
- Edited by: Shinji Tanaka
- Music by: Diamond Yukai; Daisuke Okamoto
- Production company: Nikkatsu
- Release date: 9 November 1996 (Japan)
- Running time: 88 minutes
- Country: Japan
- Language: Japanese

Dangan Runner (弾丸ランナー, also known as Non-Stop) is a 1996 Japanese comedy film directed by Sabu about a salaryman, a drug addict and a yakuza member go on a breathless three man chase through the streets of Tokyo, each for their own different reason and fighting own demons.

== Plot ==
Beginning with Yasuda, a chronically bullied salaryman due to underachievements and clumsiness, and is mocked by a woman he pines for who she derides him and her husband as well. He decides to rob a bank but forgets the mask disguise so he attempts to shoplift a respiratory mask from a convenience store for a robbery, but when a pack of young woman there point him out to Aizawa, the store clerk, a former rock band singer and later on revealed to be in debt to the yakuza to feed his drug addiction, confronts Yasuda who inadvertently shoots Aizawa in the shoulder, then chases Yasuda fleeing the store to pure adrenaline. They bump into Takeda, a low-ranking yakuza chinpira who grabs Yasuda's gun and accidentally discharges it, killing a woman, then he chases the other two. Takeda had contracted an assassin to murder a rival faction's boss but when the assassin carries out the hit, Takeda cowardly turns to the side and the attack kills his boss and the rival Yakuza faction's boss. Takeda is consumed by extreme guilt and joins in running after the two who leads him to the lair of the rival Yakuza faction. Federal enforcement agents arrive to arrest them, with Takeda's faction also arriving, with one Yakuza attempting to fire his gun only to realize it's a fake. They all then indulge in an all-out stabbing orgy that kills all of them.

== Cast ==
- Shinichi Tsutsumi as Takeda (yakuza member)
- Tomorowo Taguchi as Yasuda (chronically bullied salaryman)
- Diamond Yukai as Aizawa (drug addict convenience store employee)
- Akaji Maro
- Ren Osugi

== Reception ==
=== Critical response ===
According to critic aggregation site Rotten Tomatoes, it has a critic score of 67% based on nine reviews.

== See also ==
- Run Lola Run, 1998 German film
