= Charming (TV series) =

- Written by: Shinji Nojima
- Directed by: Ken Yoshida; Yūichirō Hirakawa; Jun Nasuda
- Starring: Hayato Ichihara; Haruka Ayase; Ryunosuke Kamiki; Rina Matsumoto; Sachiko Sakurai; Kanata Hongō; Shun Oguri
- Opening theme: "Ben" by Michael Jackson
- Country of origin: Japan
- Original language: Japanese
- No. of seasons: 1
- No. of episodes: 11

Production
- Producer: Akihiko Ishimaru
- Running time: 54 minutes

Original release
- Network: TBS
- Release: 10 April – 26 June 2005

Charming (あいくるしい, Aikurushii) is a Japanese television drama series that aired on TBS from 10 April 2005 to 26 June 2005. Hayato Ichihara played the lead role. The first episode received the viewership rating of 17.3%.

== Cast ==
- Hayato Ichihara as Gō Mashiba
- Haruka Ayase as Michiru Mashiba
- Ryunosuke Kamiki as Horo Mashiba
- Rina Matsumoto as Uta Mashiba
- Sachiko Sakurai as Yūko Nagumo
- Kanata Hongō as Shū Nagumo
- Shun Oguri as Junichi Yaguchi
- Naoki Sugiura (special appearance) as Meiji Mashiba

Preceded by M no Higeki (16 January 2005 - 20 March 2005)	TBS Sunday Dramas; Sundays 21:00 - 21:54 (JST)	Succeeded by Ima Ai ni Yukimasu (3 July 2005 - 18 September 2005)
