= Naoki Sugiura =

Japanese actor (1931–2011)

- 杉浦直樹
- Born: 8 December 1931; Okazaki, Aichi Prefecture, Japan
- Died: 21 September 2011 (aged 79); Tokyo, Japan
- Occupation: Actor

Naoki Sugiura (杉浦直樹, Sugiura Naoki) (8 December 1931 – 21 September 2011) was a Japanese actor. He began his career on stage, beginning his film career in 1957.

== Filmography ==
- Pale Flower (1964)
- Keiho (1999)
- Tsuribaka Nisshi 13: Hama-chan Kiki Ippatsu! (2002)
- Drugstore Girl (2003)

== Television ==
- Aikotoba ha Yūki (2000)
- Chūshingura 1/47 (2001)
- Charming (2005)

== Honour ==
- Order of the Rising Sun, 4th Class, Gold Rays with Rosette (2006)
