= Chasuke's Journey =

2015 film

- Film poster
- Directed by: Sabu
- Written by: Sabu
- Starring: Ken'ichi Matsuyama
- Release dates: 13 February 2015 (Berlin); 27 June 2015 (Japan)
- Country: Japan
- Language: Japanese

Chasuke's Journey (天の茶助, Ten no Chasuke) is a 2015 Japanese comedy film directed by Sabu. It was screened in the main competition section of the 65th Berlin International Film Festival.

== Cast ==
- Ken'ichi Matsuyama as Chasuke
- Ito Ohno as Yuri
- Ren Ôsugi as Taneda
- Yūsuke Iseya as Hikomura
- Hiromasa Taguchi
- Tina Tamashiro as Chako
- Susumu Terajima as Kuroki
