= Chūshingura 1/47 =

2001 film by Shunsaku Kawamo

Chushingura 1/47
- Directed by: Shunsaku Kawamo
- Written by: Yumiko Inoue
- Starring: Takuya Kimura; Kōichi Satō; Eri Fukatsu; Shin'ichi Tsutsumi; Junichi Okada; Satomi Kobayashi; Yasuko Matsuyuki; Takako Matsu; Jun Kunimura; Satomi Kobayashi; Masahiko Tsugawa; Naoki Sugiura
- Distributed by: Fuji Television
- Release date: 2001
- Running time: 120 minutes
- Country: Japan
- Language: Japanese

Chushingura 1/47 (忠臣蔵1/47) is a 2001 Japanese historical television film based on the kabuki tale of the Forty-seven Ronin. The film was produced for the Fuji TV network and directed by Shunsaku Kawamo.

== Plot ==
The film adapts the classic story of Asano Naganori and his forty-seven retainers. After Asano draws his sword against Kira in Edo Castle and is ordered to commit seppuku, his retainers, led by Ōishi Kuranosuke, plot and execute revenge against Kira, an act which ultimately ends in their own ordered seppuku by the Tokugawa shogunate. The drama focuses on the interpersonal and social consequences surrounding the incident and the ronin's preparations for vengeance.

== Production ==
Chushingura 1/47 was produced as a television project for Fuji Television and features an ensemble cast led by Takuya Kimura and Kōichi Satō. The screenplay was written by Yumiko Inoue. Production and broadcast details are listed in Japanese film databases and TV programme archives.

== Cast ==
- Takuya Kimura as Yasube Horibe
- Kōichi Satō as Kuranosuke Oishi
- Eri Fukatsu as Hori Horibe
- Naoki Sugiura as Yahyoe Horibe
- Satomi Kobayashi as Riku Oishi
- Takako Matsu as Aguri (later Yozeiin)
- Yasuko Matsuyuki as Fujimi
- Junichi Okada as Chikara Oishi
- Masahiko Tsugawa as Kozukenosuke Kira
- Satoshi Tsumabuki as Gunbe Takada
- Shin'ichi Tsutsumi as Asano Takumi-no-kami Naganori
- Machiko Washio
- Katsutoshi Arata as Hara Soemon
- Hiroyuki Ikeuchi
- Shigeru Kōyama
- Yoshinori Okada
- Ken Watanabe (cameo)
