= Postman Blues =

- Movie Poster
- Posutoman burusu
- Directed by: Hiroyuki Tanaka
- Written by: Hiroyuki Tanaka
- Screenplay by: Hiroyuki Tanaka
- Produced by: Taro Maki; Akiko Odawara; Hidemi Satani
- Starring: Shin'ichi Tsutsumi; Keisuke Horibe; Ren Osugi; Kyōko Tōyama
- Cinematography: Kuriyama Shuji
- Edited by: Kakesu Shûichi
- Music by: Daisuke Okamoto
- Production companies: Nikkatsu; Suplex; TV Tokyo
- Distributed by: Nikkatsu
- Release date: August 16, 1997 (Japan)
- Running time: 110 minutes
- Country: Japan
- Language: Japanese

Postman Blues (Japanese: ポストマン・ブルース, Hepburn: Posutoman Burūsu) is a 1997 Japanese criminal action comedy-drama film directed and written by Hiroyuki Tanaka under the name Sabu. The film features Shin'ichi Tsutsumi, Keisuke Horibe, Ren Osugi and Kyōko Tōyama in the lead roles. It tells the story of a postman (Shin'ichi Tsutsumi) who is mistaken by the police as a criminal.

The film was released in Japan in 1997 and later in Italy in 1999 and Brazil in 2003. Hiroyuki Tanaka won the New Blood award at the 1999 Cognac Festival du Film Policier for the film.

== Plot ==
Sawaki (Shinichi Tsutsumi) is a bike-riding postman in Yokohama seeking a purpose in life. A month before Christmas, Sawaki delivers a promotional flyer to his former schoolmate Noguchi (Keisuke Horibe) who, unbeknownst to Sawaki, had become a yakuza under police surveillance. Noguchi places a packet of amphetamines in Sawaki's mailbag, into which Noguchi's newly severed pinky accidentally rolls. The police note Sawaki's visit and begin tailing him.

After getting home, Sawaki gets drunk and dumps the contents of the bag over his floor. Ignoring the rest, he finds a suicide note written by a terminally ill cancer patient to her estranged aunt. He rushes to the hospital the next day to see the woman, Sayoko (Kyoko Toyama), and falls in love with her. He meets an aimless middle-aged hitman named Joe (Ren Osugi), who tells him he desires to return to a hitmen's tournament and reclaim his true identity before he dies.

After some time writing letters to each other, Sayoko and Sawaki go shopping, and play with toy guns in the harbor, while two police detectives sneak into Sawaki's apartment and discover the pinky and amphetamines, taking photos and leaving the contraband behind. They consult a profiler (Tomoro Taguchi) who comes to the false conclusion that Sawaki is a serial murderer. Meanwhile, Noguchi discovers that the finger he had cut is no longer in his house, and panics. Sawaki finally discovers the severed pinky, stuck to a card by the tournament organizers addressed to Joe, who has been catching up with a childhood friend at the docks.

The police launch a public manhunt for Sawaki. In a race against time (and unbeknownst to him, a former Olympic athlete-turned-traffic cop), Sawaki delivers the pinky to Noguchi's yakuza boss, sparing him from punishment. He gives Joe the tournament card on the shore of Tokyo Bay, not realizing Joe had already figured out he had not qualified, before biking off to the hospital to visit Sayoko. The detectives corner Joe, but a fellow contract killer shoots the two and professes her love for Joe, restoring his will to live.

Upon hearing of the manhunt, Joe and Noguchi realize they have evidence to clear Sawaki's name. They steal bicycles and catch up to a now-aware Sawaki, but as the three cross over the last bridge, they discover a large police blockade. The police shoot Sawaki, who falls to his death, as Joe and Noguchi charge at them holding the exculpatory evidence. The just-deceased Sayoko's spirit appears, and helps Sawaki's spirit rise up. They smile and walk off together, hand in hand.

== Cast ==
- Shin'ichi Tsutsumi as Sawaki
- Kyōko Tōyama as Sayoko Kitagawa
- Ren Osugi as Joe
- Keisuke Horibe as Noguchi Shuji
- Shimizu Hiroshi as Detective Domon Taizo
- Takizawa Ryoko as Ran
- Tomorowo Taguchi as Profiler
- Akaji Maro as Hanta

== Reviews and reception ==
"Postman Blues is a film in which absolutely all the characters are so completely crazy that neutralize their absurd plans against each other and the film may find itself with sleepwalking to an end, which must appear in a very bizarre way as logical."

— critic.de

The film received mixed reviews from critics, but was hailed by some of them as one of the best works of Hiroyuki Tanaka. The film was commercially successful and was declared a hit at the Japanese box office. Cinematographer Kuriyama Shuji was praised for implementing the change of camerawork from high-action scenes to love scenes. Japanese film critics praised the film by calling it "both a superb parody of the gangster genre and a masterful exercise in style and storytelling".

The film received negative reviews from a few foreign film critics. Peter Bradshaw of The Guardian called the film a "chaotic Yakuza thriller, which has a lot of energy and pace, but is let down by uncertain, and slightly callow, undertones of comic sentimentality". French critics said that "Postman Blues could have been an intelligent extension of his first film that surprised many people". It was even called a disappointment and an innocent black comedy.

== Home video release ==
DVD of the film was released by Asian Film Network.

== Awards ==
Award	Category	Nominee	Result
Bangkok Film Festival, 1998	Audience Award for best feature film - Asian Cinema		Won
Cognac Festival du Film Policier, 1999	'New Blood' Award	Hiroyuki Tanaka	Won
