= The Fable: The Killer Who Doesn't Kill =

2021 Japanese action comedy film

- Theatrical release poster
- Directed by: Kan Eguchi
- Written by: Kan Eguchi; Masahiro Yamaura
- Based on: The Fable by Katsuhisa Minami
- Produced by: Chihiro Kameyama; Taichi Ueda
- Starring: Junichi Okada; Fumino Kimura; Yurina Hirate; Masanobu Ando; Shinichi Tsutsumi
- Cinematography: Hitoshi Takaya
- Edited by: Tsuyoshi Imai
- Music by: Grandfunk Inc.
- Production companies: Shogakukan; TV Asahi; Shochiku; Geek Pictures
- Distributed by: Shochiku
- Release date: June 18, 2021 (Japan)
- Running time: 132 minutes
- Country: Japan
- Language: Japanese
- Box office: ¥1.42 billion ($12.94 million)

The Fable: The Killer Who Doesn't Kill (ザ・ファブル 殺さない殺し屋, Za Faburu Korosanai Koroshiya) is a 2021 Japanese action comedy film directed by Kan Eguchi, serving as the sequel to The Fable (2019). Based on the second half of Katsuhisa Minami's manga series, the film follows legendary hitman Akira Sato (Junichi Okada) who attempts to maintain his non-violent lifestyle in Osaka while being targeted by underworld forces. It was released theatrically in Japan on June 18, 2021, by Shochiku.

== Cast ==
- Junichi Okada as Akira Sato / "Fable"
- Fumino Kimura as Yoko Sato
- Yurina Hirate as Hinako
- Shinichi Tsutsumi as Utsubo
- Masanobu Ando as Suzuki
- Kōichi Satō as the boss
- Jiro Sato as Kenjiro Takoda
- Mizuki Yamamoto as Misaki Shimizu
- Ken Yasuda as Ebihara
- Kai Inowaki as Kuroshio
- Jun Kurose as Isaki
- Masao Yoshii as Kainuma
- Manami Hashimoto as Ai
- Daisuke Miyagawa as Jackal Tomioka

== Production ==
=== Filming ===
Production commenced February 2020 in Osaka but was halted in April due to COVID-19 restrictions. The reason so many people appear wearing masks in the film is that the director accepted the requests of extras who were anxious about the unknown virus.

== Reception ==
=== Box office ===
The film debuted at #1 in Japan, earning ¥233 million in its opening weekend. It grossed ¥1.42 billion ($12.94 million) during its theatrical run, becoming the 23rd highest-grossing Japanese film of 2021.

=== Accolades ===
Award	Category	Nominee	Result	Ref.
45th Japan Academy Film Prize	Best Supporting Actor	Shinichi Tsutsumi	Nominated	
