= Helen the Baby Fox =

2006 film by Keita Kōno

- Promotional film poster
- Directed by: Keita Kono
- Screenplay by: Masako Imai
- Story by: Minoru Taketazu (Memories of Helen the Fox)
- Produced by: Takeo Hisamatsu
- Starring: Takao Osawa, Yasuko Matsuyuki, Arashi Fukasawa, Ryoko Kobayashi
- Cinematography: Takeshi Hamada
- Edited by: Takuya Taguchi
- Music by: Yukie Nishimura
- Distributed by: Shochiku
- Release date: 18 March 2006 (Japan)
- Running time: 109 minutes
- Country: Japan
- Language: Japanese
- Box office: US$1,455,806

Helen the Baby Fox (Japanese: 子ぎつねヘレン, Hepburn: Kogitsune Heren) is a 2006 Japanese film. It was directed by director Keita Kono, and stars actors Takao Osawa, Yasuko Matsuyuki, Arashi Fukasawa and Ryoko Kobayashi in lead roles. It was released in Japanese cinemas on 18 March 2006.

Helen the Baby Fox tells the story of Taichi and a fox cub, whom Taichi found by the side of the road. The cub is blind, deaf and mute and Taichi names it Helen, after Helen Keller who has similar disabilities. They faced much skepticism and criticism from the people around them, and difficulties stemming from Helen's physical disabilities.

== Plot ==
Leaving school for the day, seven-year-old Taichi finds a baby fox, abandoned by her mother alongside a road in rural Hokkaido. The two bond and Taichi decides to leave the cub with the police as a lost item. The policeman on duty takes a reluctant Taichi and the cub to the local Yajima Veterinary Clinic. It turns out that Taichi has begun to live with Ko, the vet, and his teenage daughter Misuzu after his free-spirited mother Ritsuko has gone to Micronesia to work as a photographer. Many people have abandoned animals with Ko, and paying customers are few with most of his income coming from frequently boarding a friendly dog that is almost part of the family. Taichi feels abandoned as well, and clashes with Ko when the vet sees the new arrival as a burden, especially after discovering that the cub is deaf and blind. However, Taichi names her Helen after Helen Keller and attempts to bring her back to full health while teaching her about the world as sort of a young Annie Sullivan. Even though Taichi gets her to eat, Helen suffers increasing fits stemming from her brain, which is the result of a tumor.

== Cast ==
- Arashi Fukasawa as Taichi Ogawara (大河原太一)
- Yasuko Matsuyuki as Ritsuko Ogawara (大河原律子)
- Takao Osawa as Koji Yajima (矢島幸次)
- Ryoko Kobayashi as Misuzu Yajima (矢島美鈴)
- Shunji Fujimura as Professor Uehara
- Chiaki Ozaki as Mami (マミ)
- Kazuya Satō as Hakase (ハカセ)
- Hideko Yoshida as an old woman
- Ryoko Tanami as Teacher Yamaguchi (山口先生)
- Sadao Abe as a Police officer
- Raiki Yonemoto

== Release ==
It was first released in Japanese cinemas on 18 March 2006. It was also released in Singapore cinemas on 27 July 2006 by local distributor Shaw Organization.

== Reception ==
The South China Morning Post described the film as "the film for animal lovers."

== See also ==
- Foxes in popular culture, films and literature
- Gamera the Brave
