= Ryoko Kobayashi =

Japanese actress (born 1989)

- Born: November 8, 1989 (age 36); Tokyo, Japan
- Occupation: Actress
- Years active: 2004–present

Ryoko Kobayashi (小林涼子, Kobayashi Ryōko; born November 8, 1989) is a Japanese actress.

== Filmography ==
=== Movies ===
- Hinokio (2005), Sumire
- Kamen Rider The First (2005), Miyoko Harada
- Helen the Baby Fox (2006), Misuzu Yajima
- Leaving the Scene (2019)
- Pornographer: Playback (2021)
- My Father's Tracks (2021), Mayu Kitamura
- Mado (2022)
- As Long as We Both Shall Live (2023), Hana
- Sensei's Pious Lie (2024)
- Catching the Stars of This Summer (2025), radio personality

=== Dramas ===
- Ultraman Geed (TV Tokyo, 2017), Arie Ishikari
- The Tiger and Her Wings (NHK, 2024), Satoko Kubota
