= Daisuke Miyagawa =

Japanese comedian and actor (born 1972)

- 宮川 大輔
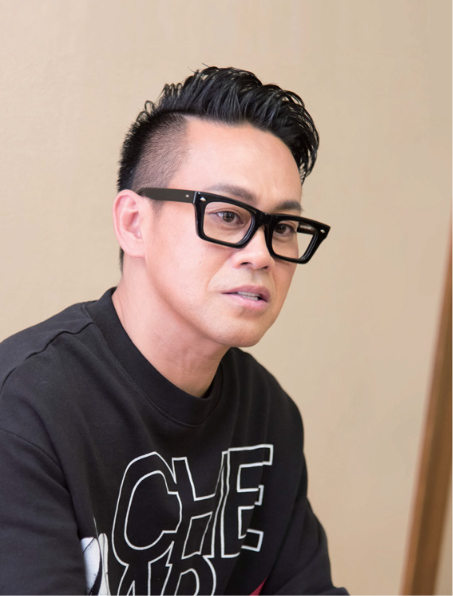
- Miyagawa in February 2018
- Born: 16 September 1972 (age 54); Kyoto, Kyoto Prefecture, Japan
- Other name: Omatsuri Otoko (お祭り男)
- Education: Ōtsu Municipal Hieidaira Elementary School; Ōtsu Municipal Ojiyama Junior High School; Kyoto Gaidai Nishi High School; NSC Osaka School
- Occupations: Comedian; actor
- Years active: 1990–present
- Agent: Yoshimoto Creative Agency
- Known for: Sekai no Hate made Itte Q!; Manten Aozora Restaurant; Honoo-no Taiiku-kai TV; Hanbon dēsu!; Shanghai Tāwan; Matsumoto Hitoshi no Marumaru na Hanashi; Waragami-sama wa Totsuzen ni...

Notes
- Same year/generation as: Ninety-nine

Daisuke Miyagawa (宮川 大輔, Miyagawa Daisuke; born 16 September 1972, in Kyoto, Kyoto Prefecture, Japan) is a Japanese comedian and actor.

Miyagawa grew up in Ōtsu, Shiga Prefecture. He is represented with Yoshimoto Creative Agency from Yoshimoto Kogyo. Miyagawa should not be confused with Daisuke Miyagawa of the comedy duo Daisuke and Hanako Miyagawa.

== Filmography ==
=== Special programmes ===
Year	Title	Notes	Ref.
2016	Daisuke Miyagawa ga Deatta... 17-sai no Hokkaidō Nōson Taiken Dareka no Tame ni Ikiru, to iu koto.	Navigator	

=== Advertisements ===
Year	Title	Notes	Ref.
2016	Yomiuriland Gujjoba!		

=== TV drama ===
Year	Title	Role	Notes	Ref.
2015	Aka Medaka	Tatekawa Kansai		

=== Films ===
Year	Title	Role	Notes
2021	The Fable: The Killer Who Doesn't Kill	Jackal Tomioka	
2022	Goodbye Cruel World		
2023	Analog	Toshikazu Takahashi	

=== Japanese dub ===
Year	Title	Role	Ref.
2016	Teenage Mutant Ninja Turtles: Out of the Shadows	Rock Steady	
2018	Ant-Man and the Wasp	Jimmy Woo	
2019	Hobbs & Shaw	British Customs Official	
