= Aikotoba wa Yūki =

- Genre: Drama, comedy-drama
- Written by: Kōki Mitani
- Theme music composer: Edward Elgar
- Opening theme: Pomp and Circumstance Marches No. 1
- Composer: Takayuki Hattori
- Country of origin: Japan
- Original language: Japanese
- No. of seasons: 1
- No. of episodes: 11

Production
- Producers: Ken Hatano, Jun Shimoyama
- Running time: 54 minutes

Original release
- Network: Fuji Television
- Release: June 6 – September 14, 2000

Aikotoba wa Yūki (合い言葉は勇気, The Password is "Courage") is a Japanese television drama that ran on Fuji Television every Thursday at 10:00 to 10:54 PM from July 6 to September 14, 2000. Its opening theme is "Pomp and Circumstance Marches No. 1", performed by the London Philharmonic Orchestra.

The complete DVD boxset was released on April 20, 2010.

== Plot ==
Tomashi village is a small village, well known for its abundance of nature and beautiful surroundings. When a development company called Funamushi plans to build an industrial waste treatment facility in the area, the villagers are unhappy with the effects it will have on the environment, and seek an injunction. The village chief goes to Tokyo and finds a young lawyer to represent them in court, the one lawyer in the city who has actually lived in the village. The man, however, knows of the company's crafty lawyer, Tanomo Aboshi...

Tarō Akihito, a once highly renowned actor who happens to play a lawyer in a TV drama, is mistaken for a real lawyer by the villagers in a freak coincidence. He finally works up his courage to begin the fight, and they convince him to represent them.

== Cast ==
- Kōji Yakusho as Tarō Akihito
- Shingo Katori as Tadashi Daiyama
- Kyōka Suzuki as Shino Inuzuka
- Masahiko Tsugawa as Tanomo Aboshi
- Kunie Tanaka as Moritaka Inuzuka
- Akira Terao as Teīchirō Kotoidani
- Jun Kunimura as Kagetora Anzai
- Akio Kaneda as Kakukura Kamoda
- Kōichi Yamadera as Chikō Keno
- Zen Kajiwara as Gisuke Kawakita
- Narushi Ikeda as Teizō Kotoidani
- Akaji Maro as Kingo Tenba
- Toshiya Tōyama as Asao Seta
- Kenji Matsutani as Hachirō Hayashi
- Hajime Inoue as Michio Daiyama
- Kōta Ishii as Yoshikichi Yamane
- Nanae Akasawa as Otoya Miyata
- Yōichi Nukumizu as Hikita
- Midoriko Kimura as Naoko Satō
- Kazuko Shirakawa as Setsuko Daiyama
- Toshiaki Karasawa as Kazushige Hatoyama
- Norito Yashima as Rei Saitō
- Naoki Sugiura as Kazutaka Akaiwa

== Staff ==
- Planning: Takashi Ishihara
- Writer: Kōki Mitani
- Director: Shunsaku Kawake, Daisuke Tajima, Takayoshi Nakayama
- Music: Takayuki Hattori
- Producer: Ken Hatano, Jun Shimoyama

== Episode list ==
Episode #	Broadcast date	Title	Audience rating
#1	July 6, 2000	Leap of Faith (奇跡を呼ぶ男, Kiseki o Yobu Otoko)	15.9%
#2	July 13, 2000	The Worst Saviour (サイテーの救世主, Saitei no Kyūseishu)	12.7%
#3	July 20, 2000	First Victory (初めての勝利, Hajimete no Shōri)	10.8%
#4	July 27, 2000	The Village Headman was Killed! (村長は殺された!, Sonchō wa Korosareta!)	11.0%
#5	August 3, 2000	Declaration of War (宣戦布告, Sensen Fukoku)	11.3%
#6	August 10, 2000	Betrayed Hero (裏切ったヒーロー, Uragitta Hīrō)	7.4%
#7	August 17, 2000	Setting Traps (仕掛けられた罠, Shikakerareta Wana)	10.4%
#8	August 24, 2000	Last Gamble (最後の賭け, Saigo no Kake)	10.1%
#9	August 31, 2000	Falling in Love (恋におちたら, Koi ni Ochitara)	10.3%
#10	September 7, 2000	Last Chance (最後のチャンス, Saigo no Chansu)	10.5%
#11	September 14, 2000	Pomp and Circumstance (威風堂々, Ifūdōdō)	13.3%

Averate ratings
11.2%
