= Yasuko Matsuyuki =

Japanese actress and singer (born 1972)

- 松雪 泰子
- Born: Yasuko Matsuyuki; November 28, 1972 (age 53); Tosu, Saga, Japan
- Occupation: Actress
- Years active: 1991–present
- Spouse: Gaku Kadowaki (m. 1998; div. 2005)
- Children: 1
- Website: www.yasukomatsuyuki.jp

Yasuko Matsuyuki (松雪 泰子, Yasuko Matsuyuki; born November 28, 1972 in Saga Prefecture) is a Japanese actress and singer signed to Stardust Promotion.

== History ==
Yasuko Matsuyuki was born in 1972 in Tosu, Saga. She has two younger brothers. One is Kōhei Takamura (高村 晃平), who is also an actor, and the other is Yo Matsuyuki who is a rock singer. In 1989, while she was in high school, Matsuyuki won a Non-no fashion magazine contest. After graduating from Tosu Commercial High School, she moved to Tokyo and started her career as a model.

In 1991, Matsuyuki made her film debut in the TV drama series "Nekketsu Shinnyū Shain Sengen". In 1993, she played an outgoing leading role in the manga based drama series "Shiratori Reiko de Gozaimasu!". That role made a big impact on the drama scene and established her career as an actress.

=== Marriage ===
In 1998, after a two year relationship, Matsuyuki married guitarist Gaku Kadowaki (門脇 学). She had a baby boy in 2001, but got divorced in 2005.

== Filmography ==
=== Film ===
Year	Title	Role	Notes	Ref.
1995	Shiratori Reiko de Gozaimasu!	Reiko Shiratori	Lead role	
2000	Another Heaven	Mina Sasamoto		
2006	Helen the Baby Fox	Ritsuko Ōgawara		
2006	Hula Girls	Madoka Hirayama	Lead role	
2008	Detroit Metal City	Death Records Manager		
2008	Suspect X	Yasuko Hanaoka		
2009	The Unbroken	Miki Mitsui		
2017	Fullmetal Alchemist	Lust		
2020	My Sweet Grappa Remedies	Yoshiko Kawashima	Lead role	
2024	Drawing Closer	Hazuki Sakurai		

=== Television ===
Year	Title	Role	Notes	Ref.
1993	Shiratori Reiko de Gozaimasu!	Reiko Shiratori	Lead role; 2 seasons	
1995	Maido Ojamashimaasu	Sakura Sawano	Lead role	
1996	Shōri no Megami	Riko Tsuda		
1997	Risō no Jōshi	Marika Shirakawa		
1998	Kirakira Hikaru	Noriko Tsukiyama		
2000	The Sun Never Sets	Setsu Kirino		
2001	Chūshingura 1/47	Fujimi	Television film	
2003	Beginner	Nozomi Morino		
2010	Mother	Nao Suzuhara	Lead role	
2012	Taira no Kiyomori	Bifukumon-in	Taiga drama	
2018	Half Blue Sky	Haru Nireno	Asadora	
2026	Water Margin	Ma Gui	Special appearance	

=== Japanese dub ===
Live-action

- The Bourne Legacy, Dr. Marta Shearing (Rachel Weisz)

Animation

- Coco, Mamá Imelda
