= Suspect X =

- DVD cover (Hong Kong release)
- Directed by: Hiroshi Nishitani
- Screenplay by: Yasushi Fukuda
- Based on: The Devotion of Suspect X by Keigo Higashino
- Produced by: Tadashi Makino; Kazutoshi Wadakura
- Starring: Masaharu Fukuyama; Kou Shibasaki; Yasuko Matsuyuki; Shinichi Tsutsumi
- Cinematography: Hideo Yamamoto
- Edited by: Masaaki Yamamoto
- Music by: Yugo Kanno; Masaharu Fukuyama
- Distributed by: Toho
- Release date: October 4, 2008 (Japan)
- Running time: 128 minutes
- Country: Japan
- Language: Japanese
- Box office: $54,846,110

Suspect X (Japanese: 容疑者Xの献身, Hepburn: Yōgisha Ekkusu no Kenshin) is a 2008 Japanese mystery-thriller film directed by Hiroshi Nishitani, and based on the novel The Devotion of Suspect X. The film is a continuation of the popular Japanese serial drama Galileo and includes the same cast. It topped Japan's box office for four consecutive weeks and was the third-highest-grossing Japanese movie in 2008. The soundtrack was released on October 1, 2008. Suspect X was the first of several film adaptations of The Devotion of Suspect X, followed by Perfect Number (2012) from South Korea and Kolaigaran (2019) and Jaane Jaan (2023) from India.

== Plot ==
A murder has occurred and the police are unable to find loopholes in the alibi of the main suspect, thus facing obstacles in the investigation.

Yasuko Hanaoka (Yasuko Matsuyuki) is a divorced, single mother who owns a restaurant. Tetsuya Ishigami (Shinichi Tsutsumi) is a reclusive, but brilliant mathematics teacher, who lives next door to Yasuko and her teenage daughter Misato. Ishigami is solemn and introverted, and his morning exchanges with Yasuko, from whose restaurant he buys lunch, is the brightest part of his day. When Togashi (Yasuko's abusive ex-husband) shows up one night to extort money from Yasuko, threatening both her and Misato, the situation quickly escalates into violence and Togashi is killed by mother and daughter in their apartment. Overhearing the commotion from his room and deducing that Togashi has been killed, Ishigami offers his help to the mother and daughter. He not only disposes the body, but also plots the cover-up step-by-step.

When the body turns up and is identified, Yasuko comes under suspicion. Detective Kaoru Utsumi (Kō Shibasaki) and her superior Detective Shunpei Kusanagi seek the help of Professor Manabu Yukawa (Masaharu Fukuyama), who seeing the case has nothing to do with physics, initially refuses to help. However, hearing that his genius former classmate, Ishigami, is the neighbour of the suspect, Yukawa changes his mind. After a happy reunion with Ishigami, for whom he has high admiration, he begins to doubt whether Ishigami had something to do with the murder, and decides to investigate the case on his own. A high level battle of wits ensues as Ishigami tries to protect Yasuko by outmaneuvering and outthinking Yukawa, who faces his most clever and determined opponent yet. Yukawa finally succeeds in cracking the case only to reveal a sad and shocking truth, that will do no good to all parties, save the police. Despite having a reputation of being detached when solving cases, Yukawa is distraught by the outcome this time.

== Cast ==
- Masaharu Fukuyama as Manabu Yukawa
- Kō Shibasaki as Kaoru Utsumi
- Shinichi Tsutsumi as Tetsuya Ishigami
- Yasuko Matsuyuki as Yasuko Hanaoka
- Miho Kanazawa as Misato Hanaoka
- Kazuki Kitamura as Shunpei Kusanagi
- Dankan as Kuniaki Kudo
- Keishi Nagatsuka as Shinji Togashi

== Reception ==
The film is not well known to the rest of the world, although it attracted much attention in Japan. It is not reviewed by any prominent English websites, but it was generally well received by both the audiences and the critics in the countries in which it has been shown. The film was very successful in Japan, grossing ¥4.92 billion ($52,323,944), becoming the 6th highest-grossing film of 2008, and the third highest-grossing domestic film of 2008.
