= Kyoto Gaidai Nishi High School =

School in Kyoto, Japan

Coordinates: 35°0′18.12″N 135°43′6.65″E

Kyoto Gaidai Nishi High School (KGN) is a 3-year (grades 10, 11, and 12) article one private high school in the city of Kyoto, Japan. KGN is one of four institutions overseen by the board of Governors (BOG) of Kyoto University of Foreign Studies (KUFS). All institutions share the common philosophy of World Peace through Languages, though KGN was founded on the principles of futohfukutsu. There is no direct translation of this term; however, KGN states the following from the scriptures of Nisshinkan:

No matter what difficulties are involved in doing what you need to do and what you have to do, be firm with the mental spirit. As long as you are human, you will be accompanied by struggles. When you do encounter struggles, proceed without fuss and without panic, and you will overcome your struggles and grow as an individual.

Through the principles of futohfukutsu, KGN aims to cultivate strong (tsuyoku), reasonable (tadashiku), and knowledgeable (akaruku) students to contribute towards a developing society through a love of learning, moral principles, and the nourishment of 'self expression' and 'foresight'.

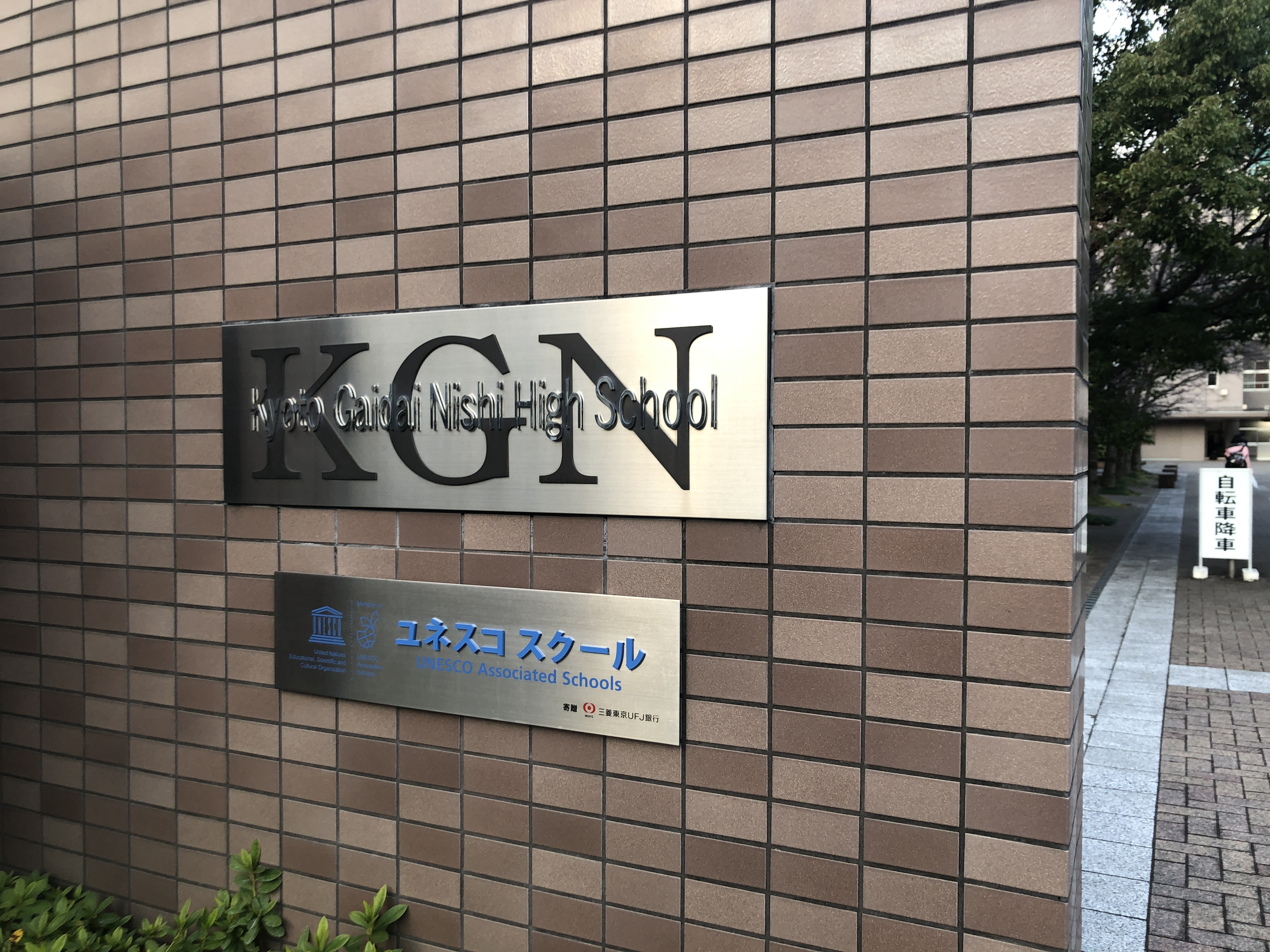
Main gate of Kyoto Gaidai Nishi High School with name plate and UNESCO School plate

KGN's student population of about 950 (fluctuates year by year) mostly commute from within Kyoto City and surrounding communities, with students also commuting from neighboring prefectures Shiga, Osaka, Hyogo and Nara. There is a small student population of returnee students (students who have lived and studied outside Japan for an extended period of time) and students of mixed ethnical backgrounds. Students are provided an array of extracurricular activities in both sports and culture. KGN also strives to provide students with opportunities to explore a range of topics and interests that would not be covered in conventional high school curricula. Since 1990, all grade 12 students of the International & Cultural Studies course participate in the Kansai High School Model United Nations, whose General Assembly is conducted in English. As a result of this and other activities, KGN was recognized as a UNESCO School in 2013 and was chosen to represent Kyoto Prefecture at the 2014 World Youth Forum on Education for Sustainable Development. In 2017, KGN was recognized as a Tokyo 2020 Olympic & Paralympic Education School.

In 2018, 75% of KGN's graduates moved on to a 4-year university and 15% to a 2-year vocational college. 3% moved into the workforce. Every year, a very small number of students attend college outside Japan.

KGN currently offers students 4 tracks of study from which to choose: College Preparatory (Tokushin) Course, International and Cultural Studies (IC) Course, General Academic (GA) Course, and Sports Education Course.

== Courses offered ==
=== Global Tokushin Course ===
The Global Tokushin Course is an advanced academic course for students whose primary focus is to move on to a four-year university, with either a focus in liberal arts or sciences.

=== International and Cultural Studies Course ===
The IC Course is an English co-emersion course with faculty of both Japanese and foreign teachers, and is designed for students who have an interest in foreign language and in engaging in foreign relations as a profession, either domestic or abroad. About a third of IC course students are admitted to KUFS every year.

=== General Academic Course ===
The GA Course is designed for students who require additional support in academic studies, or who wish to focus extensively on extracurricular club activities.

=== Sports Education Course ===
The Sports Education Course is designed for students who focus extensively on scholastic athletic competition, with additional studies in various athletic-related fields.

== International Exchange Program ==
Students are offered opportunities to both study abroad and become hosts for students studying in Japan. As of 2016, KGN is engaged in sister-school relationships with 6 institutions in New Zealand and Canada, offering 1-month, 6-month, and 1-year opportunities to live and study abroad. KGN is also partnered with institutions in Malaysia, the United States, and Australia, offering short-term opportunities for either studying abroad or international exchange through various social media outlets. Also, a handful of students from around the world have experienced both short-term and long-term stays at KGN with students’ families as hosts through various institutions such as the Rotary Club and AFS Intercultural Programs.

== Kansai High School Model United Nations ==
Kansai High School Model United Nations (Japanese: 関西高校模擬国連大会), abbreviated as KHSMUN, is a model united nations project administered by the Course of International and Cultural Studies at Kyoto Gaidai Nishi High School in Kyoto, Japan, which includes a multi-day conference held annually at the Kyoto International Conference Center (ICC Kyoto) in Kyoto, Japan. Participants of the conference are high school students from various high schools within and around the Kansai region of Japan. The first conference was held in 1991 at Kyoto University of Foreign Studies with 2 high schools participating, and has since then grown to include over 250 participants representing 12 high schools. The conference is divided into two commissions, and is conducted mostly in English. with an opening ceremony, bloc/committee meetings, a poster session, and 3 General Assembly sessions.

Kansai High School Model United Nations is the first MUN conference in Japan developed for high school students learning English as a foreign language (EFL).

=== History ===
The conference was originally known as the Kyoto High School Model United Nations, which began as a capstone project for year three students at then Kyoto Nishi High School (Now Kyoto Gaidai Nishi High School) as part of the curriculum for the Course of International and Cultural Studies. The first conference was held in 1991 at Kyoto University of Foreign Studies with 2 high schools participating, Kyoto Nishi High School and Kansai International High School (known as International Academy of Technology at the time). The number of participating schools grew to 5 in its second year in 1992. The conference saw its largest number of participating schools in 2012, with 13 schools represented by 330 participants.

In 2002, the conference was held for the first time at the ICC Kyoto. The conference returned to Kyoto University of Foreign Studies in 2004, but was held again at the ICC Kyoto in 2006, and has been the conference's venue since then.

In 2010, UNESCO Goodwill Ambassador Dr. Agnes Chan was the keynote speaker for the conference's 20th anniversary opening ceremony.

In 2011, Kyoto Gaidai Nishi High School was awarded The Kyoto Private School Promotion Association Award (Japanese: 京都私学振興会賞) for its Kansai High School Model United Nations project, recognizing the multi-day conference as an optimal learning method aimed at EFL learners.

In 2015, president of the United Nations Association of Japan and UNESCO Goodwill Ambassador Sen Sōshitsu XV was the keynote speaker for the conference's 25th anniversary opening ceremony.

In 2020, due to the ongoing coronavirus pandemic, the conference was held online for the course of 7 weeks. The conference returned to a 3-day format in 2021, but remained online
