= Shinichi Tsutsumi =

Japanese actor (born 1964)

- 堤 真一
- Born: July 7, 1964 (age 62); Nishinomiya, Hyōgo, Japan
- Occupation: Actor
- Years active: 1984–present
- Spouse: Undisclosed (m. 2013)

Shinichi Tsutsumi (堤 真一, Tsutsumi Shin'ichi; born July 7, 1964) is a Japanese stage and screen actor. Internationally, he is best known for his roles as Koichi Takagi in the Monday films, Tetsuya Ishigami in the Suspect X films, and Jo Sawashiro in Yakuza: Like a Dragon. In Japan, he is best known for his roles as Ōsuke Nakahara in Yamatonadeshiko drama series, and Norifumi Suzuki in Always: Sunset on Third Street films. He won the Japanese Academy Award for Best Supporting Actor in 2005 for Always: Sunset on Third Street. In 2013, he was nominated for an International Emmy Award for best actor for his role in Yasu – A Single Father's Story.

== Life and career ==
Tsutsumi was born in Hyōgo Prefecture. He began training at the age of 18 with Shinichi "Sonny" Chiba's Japan Action Club. When he was at Japan Action Club (JAC) he had been the manager of Hiroyuki Sanada for several years.

In 2013, he was nominated for an International Emmy Award for best actor for his role in Yasu – A Single Father's Story.

== Filmography ==
=== Films ===
Year	Title	Role	Notes	Ref.
1989	Bakayaro 2	Maruo Kaziki	Lead role	
1992	The Oil-Hell Murder	Yohe Kawachiya		
1996	Secret Waltz	Jun Hino		
1996	Dangan Runner	Kazuo Takeda	Lead role	
1997	Postman Blues	Ryuichi Sawaki	Lead role	
1998	Unlucky Monkey	Yamazaki	Lead role	
1999	Keiho	Masaki Shibata	Lead role	
2000	Monday	Koichi Takagi	Lead role	
2002	Drive	Kenichi Asakura	Lead role	
2003	Sotsugyo	Satoru Mayama	Lead role	
2004	One Missed Call	Hiroshi Yamashita		
2005	Lorelei: The Witch of the Pacific Ocean	Asakura Ryokitsu		
2005	Fly, Daddy, Fly	Hajime Suzuki	Lead role	
2005	The Summer of the Ubume	Akihiko Chuzenji	Lead role	
2005	Always: Sunset on Third Street	Norifumi Suzuki		
2006	Riding the Metro	Shinji Hasebe	Lead role	
2007	Maiko Haaaan!!!	Kichiro Naito	Lead role	
2007	Always: Sunset on Third Street 2	Norifumi Suzuki		
2007	Mōryō no Hako	Akihiko Chuzenji	Lead role	
2008	My Darling of the Mountains	Shintaro Omura		
2008	Climber's High	Kazuma Yuuki	Lead role	
2008	Suspect X	Tetsuya Ishigami		
2009	Villon's Wife	Tsuji		
2010	SP: The Motion Picture	Sōichirō Ogata		
2010	The Lone Scalpel	Dr. Tōma	Lead role	
2010	Space Battleship Yamato	Mamoru Kodai		
2011	SP: The Motion Picture II	Sōichirō Ogata		
2011	Princess Toyotomi	Gen Matsudaira	Lead role	
2012	Always: Sunset on Third Street 3	Norifumi Suzuki		
2012	Space Brothers	Hoshika Tadashi		
2013	I'll Give It My All... Tomorrow	Shizuo Ōguro	Lead role	
2013	Why Don't You Play in Hell?	Jun Ikegami	Lead role	
2014	The Mole Song: Undercover Agent Reiji	Masaya Hiura		
2015	The Emperor in August	Hisatsune Sakomizu		
2015	Our Little Sister	Kazuya Shiina		
2015	Kakekomi	Horikiriya		
2015	Bali Big Brother	Aniki	Lead role	
2016	Fueled: The Man They Called Pirate	Tatsurō Morita		
2016	The Mole Song: Hong Kong Capriccio	Masaya Hiura		
2017	Honnō-ji Hotel	Oda Nobunaga	Lead role	
2017	Destiny: The Tale of Kamakura	Honda		
2018	Gintama 2	Katakuriko Matsudaira		
2019	Don't Cry, Mr. Ogre	Takashi Kobuchi	Lead role	
2019	The 47 Ronin in Debt	Ōishi Kuranosuke	Lead role	
2020	Not Quite Dead Yet	Kakeru Nobata		
2020	Hope	Kazuto Ishikawa	Lead role	
2021	My Blood & Bones in a Flowing Galaxy			
2021	The Fable: The Killer Who Doesn't Kill	Utsubo		
2021	The Mole Song: Final	Masaya Hiura		
2022	The Deer King	Van (voice)	Lead role	
2023	Confess to Your Crimes	Seijirō Uda		
2025	Muromachi Outsiders	Honekawa Dōken		
2025	Babanba Banban Vampire	Oda Nobunaga		
2025	Army on the Tree	Kazuo Yamashita	Lead role	
2025	Two Seasons, Two Strangers	Ben-zō		
2025	After the Quake	Miyake		
2026	Arrested Memory		Taiwanese-Japanese film	

=== TV series ===
Year	Title	Role	Notes	Ref.
1987	Hashi no Ue ni Oideyo	Haruki	Lead role; television film	
1987	Dokuganryu Masamune	Ashina Yoshihiro	Taiga drama	
1988	Takeda Shingen	Takeda Yoshinobu	Taiga drama	
1990	Tobu ga Gotoku	Yazaki Hachirōta	Taiga drama	
1995	Hachidai Shogun Yoshimune	Tokugawa Yoshimichi	Taiga drama	
1996	Pure	Tōru Sawatari		
1999	Genroku Ryoran	Takada Gunbei	Taiga drama	
1999	Doctor	Kazuma Aso	Lead role	
2000	Yamatonadeshiko	Ōsuke Nakahara		
2001	Chūshingura 1/47	Asano "Takumi no Kami" Naganori	Television film	
2002	Koi no Chikara	Kotaro Nukui		
2002	The Queen of Lunchtime Cuisine	Kenichiro Nabeshima		
2003	Musashi	Hon'iden Matahachi	Taiga drama	
2003	Good Luck!!	Kazuki Kōda		
2006	Sailor Suit and Machine Gun	Makoto Sakuma		
2007	SP	Sōichirō Ogata		
2012	Yasu – A Single Father’s Story	Yasuo Ichikawa	Lead role	
2015	Massan	Kinjirō Kamoi	Asadora	
2018	From Today, It's My Turn!!	Yakuza	Cameo; episode 10	
2021	Reach Beyond the Blue Sky	Hiraoka Enshirō	Taiga drama	
2022	Adventure of Comandante Cappellini	Tadashi Hirota	Television film	
2022	If My Wife Becomes an Elementary School Student.	Keisuke Niijima	Lead role	
2025	The Ghost Writer's Wife	Den Ushimizu	Asadora	
2025	After the Quake	Miyake	Episode 2; miniseries	
2026	Gift	Fumito Gotetsu	Lead role	
2026	Cut, Dad! Are We the "Best" Family?	Ryota Tarayama		

=== Theatre ===
Year	Title	Role	Notes	Ref.
1994	Kilu	Temjin (Genghis Khan)	Lead role	
1995	The Changeling	De Flores	Lead role	
1996	Piano	Platonov	Lead role	
1996	Macbeth	Macduff		
1997	Kilu	Temjin (Genghis Khan)	Lead role	
1997	Toudai	Noboru Kurokawa	Lead role	
1998	A Prayer for My Daughter	Jack Delasante		
1998	Lulu	Alwa		
1999	A View from the Bridge	Eddie Carbone	Lead role	
1999	Pandora's Bell	Mizuwo	Lead role	
2001	Beast is Red	Yajiro	Lead role	
2001	In the Forest, Under Cherries in Full Bloom	Mimio	Lead role	
2002	A Streetcar Named Desire	Stanley Kowalski	Lead role	
2002	Aterui	Sakanoue no Tamuramaro	Lead role	
2006	Tango at the end of winter		Lead role	
2008	A Doll's House	Torvald Helmer	Lead role	
2010	K2	Harold	Lead role	
2013	Macbeth	Macbeth	Lead role	
2014	The Lonesome West	Coleman	Lead role	
2015	Three Sisters	Aleksandr Ignatyevich Vershinin		
2015	Tomorrow the end of police officer Saibara	Saibara	Lead role	
2016	Arcadia	Bernard Nightingale	Lead role	
2016	The Crucible	John Proctor	Lead role	
2018	Chikamatsu Shinjyu Monogatari	Chubei	Lead role	
2018	Oran Toujou	Kogoro Akechi	Lead role	
2018	An Enemy of the People	Doctor Thomas Stockmann	Lead role	
2019	Every Good Boy Deserves Favour	Alexander Ivanov	Lead role	
2019	Venice Concerto of Love	Florind		
2019	Death and the Maiden	Gerardo Escobar	Lead role	
2020	Twelve Angry Men	Juror 8	Lead role	
2021	Peter and Wendy	Captain Hook and Mr. Darling		
2022	All My Sons	Joe Keller	Lead role	

=== Video games ===
Year	Title	Role	Ref.
2020	Yakuza: Like a Dragon	Jo Sawashiro	
2024	Like a Dragon: Infinite Wealth	Jo Sawashiro	

=== Commercials ===
Year	Title	Ref.
2007	Fujitsu FMV	
2008	Lixil Group Tostem and Lixil	
2012	Daihatsu Mira e:S	
2012	Asahi Beer Zerokaku	
2013–2017	AXA General Insurance Company Limited	
2014	Hino Motors Hino Dutro	
2015	NTT Docomo	
2017–present	Kirin Ichiban Shibori	

== Awards and nominations ==
Year	Award	Category	Nominated work	Result	Ref.
2005	30th Hochi Film Awards	Best Supporting Actor	Always: Sunset on Third Street and Fly, Daddy, Fly	Won	
2005	18th Nikkan Sports Film Awards	Best Supporting Actor	Always: Sunset on Third Street and Fly, Daddy, Fly	Won	
2006	48th Blue Ribbon Awards	Best Supporting Actor	Always: Sunset on Third Street and Fly, Daddy, Fly	Won	
2006	79th Kinema Junpo Awards	Best Supporting Actor	Always: Sunset on Third Street and Fly, Daddy, Fly	Won	
2006	29th Japan Academy Film Prize	Best Supporting Actor	Always: Sunset on Third Street	Won	
2008	31st Japan Academy Film Prize	Best Supporting Actor	Always: Sunset on Third Street 2 and Maiko Haaaan!!!	Nominated	
2008	33rd Hochi Film Awards	Best Actor	Suspect X and Climber's High	Won	
2009	32nd Japan Academy Film Prize	Best Actor	Climber's High	Nominated	
2009	32nd Japan Academy Film Prize	Best Supporting Actor	Suspect X	Nominated	
2011	65th Mainichi Film Awards	Best Actor	The Lone Scalpel	Won	
2011	34th Japan Academy Film Prize	Best Actor	The Lone Scalpel	Nominated	
2013	41st International Emmy Awards	Best Actor	Yasu – A Single Father’s Story	Nominated	
2022	45th Japan Academy Film Prize	Best Supporting Actor	The Fable: The Killer Who Doesn't Kill	Nominated	
2026	80th Mainichi Film Awards	Best Supporting Performance	Two Seasons, Two Strangers	Nominated	
