= Channel wa Sonomama! =

Japanese manga series

- First tankōbon volume cover

チャンネルはそのまま!
- Genre: Comedy
- Manga
- Written by: Noriko Sasaki
- Published by: Shogakukan
- Magazine: Weekly Big Comic Spirits
- Original run: 7 April 2008 – 27 April 2013
- Volumes: 6
- Television drama
- Directed by: Katsuyuki Motohiro
- Produced by: Masamishi Ureshino; Ken Tada; Hideki Sakamoto
- Written by: Hayashi Mori
- Music by: Akimitsu Honma
- Studio: Production I.G.
- Original network: HTB; Netflix
- Original run: 18 March 2019 – 22 March 2019
- Episodes: 5
- icon

Channel wa Sonomama! (チャンネルはそのまま!; 'Stay Tuned!') is a Japanese manga written and illustrated by Noriko Sasaki. It was serialized in Shogakukan's seinen manga magazine Weekly Big Comic Spirits between 2008 and 2013.

The main character is Hanako Yukimaru, a rookie, clumsy journalist at fictional Hokkaido Hoshi (Star) Television (HHTV) in Sapporo.

== Media ==
=== Manga ===
Written and illustrated by Noriko Sasaki, Channel wa Sonomama! was serialized in Shogakukan's seinen manga magazine Weekly Big Comic Spirits from 7 April 2008 to 27 April 2013. Shogakukan collected its chapters in six tankōbon volumes, released from 30 January 2009 to 30 July 2013.

==== Volumes ====
No.	Japanese release date	Japanese ISBN
1	30 January 2009	978-4-09-182450-9
2	29 January 2010	978-4-09-183105-7
3	30 November 2010	978-4-09-183580-2
4	30 November 2011	978-4-09-184095-0
5	30 July 2012	978-4-09-184588-7
6	30 July 2013	978-4-09-185446-9

=== Drama ===
A Japanese television drama adaptation starring Kyoko Yoshine was produced by Production I.G. and TV Asahi affiliate HTB, where it was broadcast during the week from 18 to 22 March 2019. The series was launched to celebrate HTB's 50th anniversary.

The drama series has been available globally on Netflix, with the English title Stay Tuned!, since 21 March 2019. It has been available on Netflix Japan since 11 March 2019.

After its premiere broadcast on Hokkaido, the drama series has been syndicated to other stations all over Japan.

==== Cast ====
- Kyoko Yoshine: Hanako Yukimaru, HHTV journalist
- Hiroki Iijima: Hajime Yamane, HHTV journalist
- Kanako Miyashita: Maki Hanae, HHTV journalist and news presenter
- Takuro Osada: Hayato Kitagami, HHTV programming employee
- Taisei Shima: Tetsutarō Hattori, HHTV sales employee
- Hikaru Takihara: Seiichi Tachibana, HHTV master control employee
- Yō Ōizumi (TEAM-NACS): Masayoshi Kanbara, head of NPO Sprout Mind
- Takayuki Suzui: Takayasu Suzuki, HHTV president
- Ayumu Saito: Mamoru Shōgasaki, HHTV chief executive
- Atsuo Ouchi: Heizō Hasegawa, HHTV news director
- Hayato Myo: Keiji Osada, HHTV police news chief
- Tadahisa Fujimura: Toraya Ogura, HHTV information director
- Kimiko Jitsukawa: Reiko Kurenai, HHTV announcer
- Hitoshi Fujio: Yousuke Furuya, HHTV weather forecaster
- Ken Yasuda (TEAM-NACS): Katori, Higuma TV (HHTV rival station) information director
- Toshie Negishi: Tane, Hanako's grandmother
- Hiroyuki Morisaki (TEAM-NACS): Mamoru Yukimaru, Hanako's father
- Tatsuko Kojima, Sanae, Hanako's mother
- Takuma Otoo (TEAM-NACS): Gotō
- Shigeyuki Totsugi (TEAM-NACS): Investigator
