= Ichimoni! =

- Also known as: ichioshi! morning
- イチモニ!
- Genre: News broadcasting
- Country of origin: Japan
- Original language: Japanese
- No. of episodes: 3000

Original release
- Network: HTB
- Release: March 28, 2011 – present

“Ichimoni!” is a breakfast television produced in-house by Hokkaido Television Broadcasting (HTB) and broadcast Monday through Saturday since March 28, 2011. Until September 14, 2018, the program was titled “Ichioshi! Morning.”

== Outline ==
Its predecessor programs were the weekday morning show “Oha Ten” (5:30 - 6:25 AM) and the information program “Honwaka Doyoubi” (12:00 - 1:00 PM on Saturdays), which aired until December 2010.

It launched as the morning information program version of “Ichioshi!!”, (Note: The name of the program until March 2019 is "Ichioshi!") which airs weekday evenings.

It primarily targets younger audiences, incorporating regional news, entertainment updates, special features, and live broadcasts like “Monipure!” and “Ima Kore”. While classified as a “news / information program”, it blends variety show elements through regular cast talk segments and content, sometimes self-identifying as a “variety show”. Furthermore, while studio guests on other networks' programs in the same time slot typically sit in one or two rows facing a long table, this program uniquely arranges chairs in a tiered platform style without a table. Only the segment hosts and MCs stand on either side of a monitor positioned to their left to facilitate the show. However, this format was introduced only after the studio set change in late March 2015; previously, it used a long table like other networks. Furthermore, following the spread of the novel coronavirus, the tiered seating format was discontinued except for the August 28, 2020 broadcast when Ishizawa graduated. Instead, the table used for ‘Ichioshi!!’ was employed. However, starting September 28 of the same year, the tiered format was reinstated with acrylic panels separating participants to maintain distance (the August 28 broadcast also used this setup).

During the program, celebrities being interviewed sometimes make a pose with one hand: they touch all fingers except the index finger and thumb (the OK sign) to form the number “6,” derived from HTB's remote key ID and the broadcast start time.

Similar to other ANN core stations' morning in-house programs, the news segment covers both Hokkaido news and national news (using footage from ANN affiliate stations). It also emphasizes sports coverage, particularly focusing on the Hokkaido Nippon-Ham Fighters and Hokkaido Consadole Sapporo.

While differentiation from the evening program “Ichioshi!” is evident, the show initially featured a comprehensive broadcasting system with coordinated reporting and planning, cast interactions, and shared campaigns/projects linked to ‘Ichioshi!’. Additionally, promotional posters initially used a shared design featuring cast members from both “Ichioshi!” and “Ichimoni!” hosts, but now feature separate designs.

A concrete example of this synergy was the “Ichioshi! Scoop” segment. This featured in-depth follow-up coverage of news or topics first aired on “Ichioshi! Morning” before the evening “Ichioshi!” broadcast began. Similarly, segments like “Hidden Meals” and “Scams Right Now,” which are now exclusive to “Ichioshi!”, were also aired on “Ichioshi! Morning” in the past.

The initial catchphrase was “Tsunagaru, Egao.” (Connecting Smiles.) the same as the simultaneously revamped “Ichioshi!” program, reusing a phrase previously used on “Ichioshi!”.

From the start, the logo shared the same design as “Ichioshi!”, using a moegiiro base color. The first logo featured the station's mascot, On-chan, in the dot of the “!” symbol. However, later on, the weekday edition adopted a different design: a horizontal version in the same color. The second-generation logo, introduced after the September 2018 relocation and title change, retained the light green base color but changed to a design where the title was written inside a circular frame. The circular frame was modeled after a clock, with only the section corresponding to 6:00 to 8:00 (the weekday broadcast time; the 6:00 position is shown in yellow) having a different color.

The weather broadcast “Oha Ten” was originally aired from in front of Hokkaido Television's headquarters in the suburbs of Sapporo. However, this location presented issues due to differing weather conditions compared to Chuo Ward, Sapporo City. Before the company building relocation, the broadcast base was moved to in front of Odori Bisse in Chuo Ward for weekday broadcasts only. Broadcasts from in front of Hokkaido Television's Minami-Hirakishi headquarters were then limited to Saturdays (the same applied to the evening program “Ichioshi!”). After the headquarters relocation, both weekday and Saturday broadcasts are now conducted live from in front of the headquarters building at Sosei Square in Chuo Ward.

The program's timetable and format were modeled after the high-rated Kyushu Asahi Broadcasting (KBC) show “Asadesu. KBC”. Before the broadcast began, the cast and staff traveled to KBC in Fukuoka to observe and study their live broadcast.

Starting September 29, 2014, the weekday edition began 25 minutes earlier at 6:00 AM, expanding by 25 minutes. The Saturday edition expanded by 30 minutes during the April 2015 programming changes. The Saturday broadcast time was further extended starting April 4, 2020.

From January 2020, the weather segment was distributed via the VOD service “acTVila”.

== Staff ==
- Produce works - HTB

=== Past staff ===
Both HTB announcers.

- Producer - Ryutaro Tojima
- Chief producer - Junichi Sugiyama

== See also ==
=== Morning shows of affiliated station ===
- Good! Morning (TV Asahi)
- Ohayoh Asahi Desu (ABC Television)
- Dodesuka! (Nagoya Broadcasting Network)
