= Yo Oizumi =

Japanese actor and seiyū (born 1973)

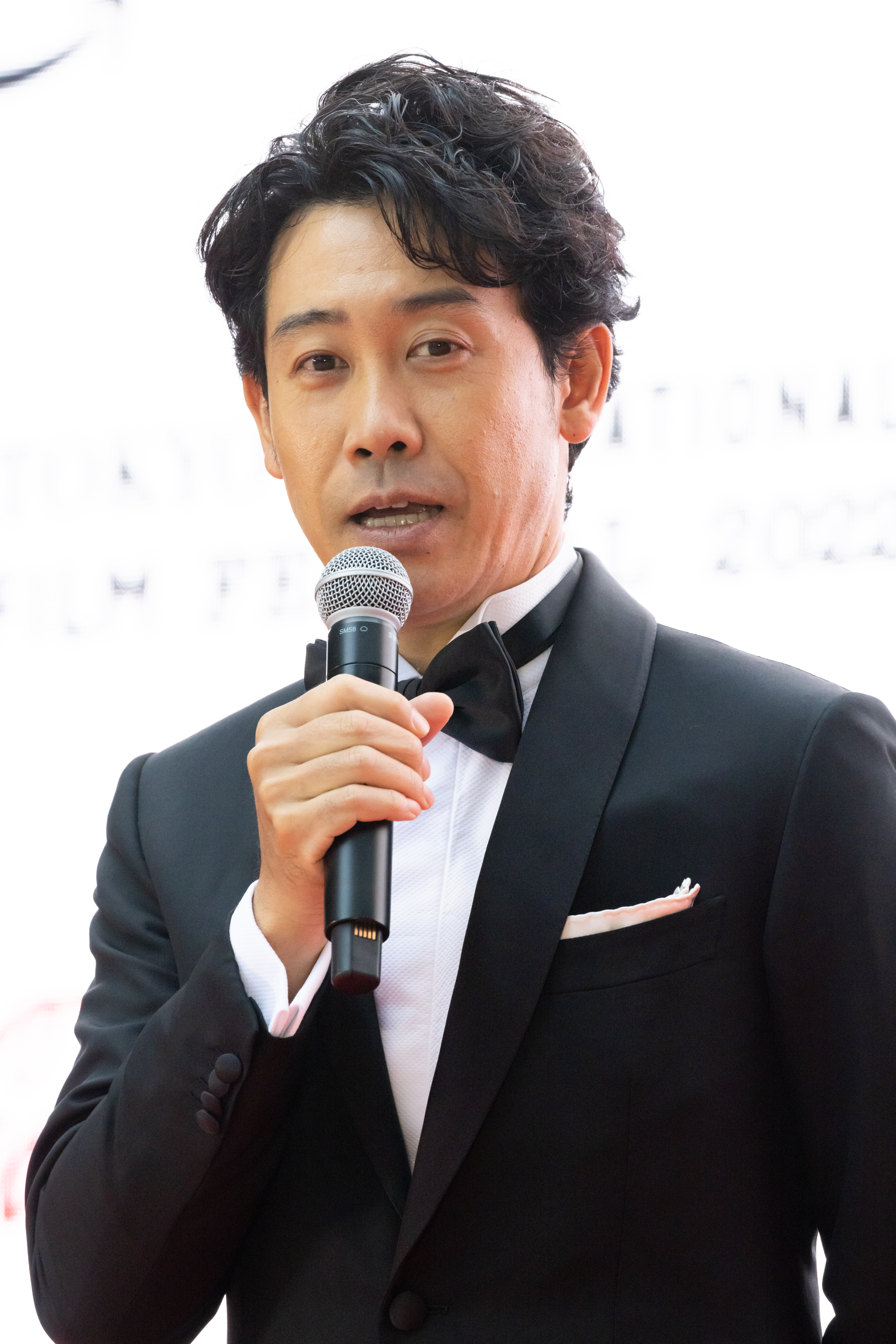
- Oizumi in 2022
- Born: Yo Oizumi; April 3, 1973 (age 53); Ebetsu, Hokkaido, Japan
- Occupation: Actor
- Years active: 1995–present
- Agents: Creative Office Cue; Amuse Inc. (Business Partnership)
- Spouse: Kumiko Nakajima (m. 2009)
- Children: 1

Yo Oizumi (大泉 洋, Ōizumi Yō; born April 3, 1973) is a Japanese actor, comedian, television personality and voice actor. He is a member of the theatrical and musical unit Team Nacs, and is represented by Creative Office Cue. His wife Kumiko Nakajima is a drama producer at Fuji TV. His senior brother Jun Oizumi is 10th public elected Mayor of Hakodate.

In 1995, while still in university, Oizumi debuted as an entertainer on the late-night program Mosaic nights aired in Hokkaidō. He first gained popularity on the television series How Do You Like Wednesday?, and has since expanded to various fields of entertainment, such as television dramas, films, voice acting and music.

== Biography ==
=== Early life and career beginnings ===
Oizumi was born at the Ebetsu City Hospital in Ebetsu, Hokkaidō. He has been living in Sapporo since 1984. After graduating Sapporo Moiwa High School, he failed his entrance exams and did nothing but "play around".

After failing his entrance exams two years in a row, in 1994, he entered the Hokkai Gakuen University to study business. Oizumi did not wish to enter the university, and was so depressed that his mother worried that "he might die". However, realizing that he cannot just let himself rot away, he entered the university's theater club. In 1996, he organized the theatrical company Team Nacs with his friends, Hiroyuki Morisaki, Ken Yasuda, Shigeyuki Totsugi, Takuma Otoo. The company disbanded after Morisaki and Yasuda graduated, but reunited after the two quit their jobs to join again.

In 1995, through the recommendation of Totsugi and Morisaki, Oizumi joined the Inada Troupe organized by Hiroshi Inada, and was a member until 2004. According to Oizumi, Inada taught him "how to stand on the stage".

=== Career ===
In October 1995, when Oizumi was still in university, he debuted as an entertainer through his portrayal of 2nd generation Genki-kun on the late-night program Mosaic nights aired on HTB. He was chosen after the program staff were searching for Mamoru Tanaka, the original Genki-kun, and Oizumi was introduced to the director by Ito Ayumi, the wife of Takayuki Suzui. Oizumi joined the entertainment agency Creative Office Cue directly after this.

Oizumi first made a name for himself in a Hokkaidō-based TV variety series How do you like Wednesday? and has been actively appearing on various media programs in Hokkaidō since then. Team-Nacs had run their first national tour with their 11th original play Composer during spring and summer 2005. After this, they held their 12th tour Honor in Tokyo, Osaka and Sapporo, through March to May 2007. In 2007, he provided the voice of Professor Hershel Layton in the puzzle video game Professor Layton and the Curious Village as well as its sequels and movie.

Along with the increasing popularity of How do you like Wednesday? and Team-Nacs not only within Hokkaidō but throughout Japan, he expanded his works in various fields by appearing on nationwide TV dramas and films, portraying character voices on animated films and releasing CDs as a singer. In addition to voice acting, he has also been active as a writer and painter.

He calls his fans "Koneko chan tachi", which means "kittens" in Japanese, although he does not like cats.

=== Private life ===
On May 30, 2011, he became the father of a baby girl. On his website he joked saying, "Today I successfully became a father!"

== Filmography ==
=== Film ===
| Year | Film | Role | Notes | Ref. |
|---|---|---|---|---|
| 1996 | Gamera 2: Attack of Legion | | | |
| 2001 | Man-hole | | | |
| 2001 | Spirited Away | Bandai Gaeru (voice) | | |
| 2002 | Pakodatejin | Haruo Fruta | | |
| 2002 | The Cat Returns | Teacher (voice) | | |
| 2003 | Nasu: Summer in Andalusia | Pepe (voice) | Lead role | |
| 2003 | River | | Lead role | |
| 2004 | Howl's Moving Castle | Prince Turnip (voice) | | |
| 2004 | Angel in the Box | | | |
| 2006 | Brave Story | Kee Keema (voice) | | |
| 2006 | Simsons | Heita Ōmiya | | |
| 2006 | Sugar and Spice | | | |
| 2007 | Ge Ge Ge no Kitaro | Nezumi Otoko | | |
| 2008 | After School | Ryōtarō Jinno | Lead role | |
| 2009 | Professor Layton and the Eternal Diva | Professor Layton (voice) | Lead role | |
| 2010 | Looking up at the Half-Moon | Gorō Natsume | | |
| 2011 | Moshidora | Makoto Kachi | | |
| 2011 | Phone Call to the Bar | The Detective | Lead role | |
| 2012 | Bread of Happiness | Nao Mizushima | Lead role | |
| 2012 | G'mor Evian! | Yagu | Lead role | |
| 2013 | The Kiyosu Conference | Hashiba Hideyoshi | Lead role | |
| 2013 | Detective in the Bar | The Detective | Lead role | |
| 2014 | Twilight: Saya in Sasara | Yutaro | Lead role | |
| 2014 | A Drop of the Grapevine | Ao | Lead role | |
| 2014 | A Bolt from the Blue | Haruo Todoroki | Lead role | |
| 2015 | Kakekomi | Shinjirō Nakamura | Lead role | |
| 2015 | The Boy and the Beast | Tatara (voice) | | |
| 2016 | I Am a Hero | Hideo Suzuki | Lead role | |
| 2016 | Gold Medal Man | Mr. Kawahara | | |
| 2017 | Fullmetal Alchemist | Shou Tucker | Special appearance | |
| 2017 | Tokyo Ghoul | Kureo Mado | | |
| 2017 | The Last Shot in the Bar | The Detective | Lead role | |
| 2018 | After the Rain | Masami Kondō | Lead role | |
| 2018 | Doraemon the Movie: Nobita's Treasure Island | Captain Silver (voice) | | |
| 2018 | Yakiniku Dragon | Tetsuo | | |
| 2018 | My Dad is a Heel Wrestler | The editor in chief | Special appearance | |
| 2018 | A Banana? At This Time of Night? | Yasuaki Shikano | Lead role | |
| 2019 | Restaurant from the Sky | Wataru | Lead role | |
| 2020 | May I Quit Being a Mom!? | Narrator | Documentary film | |
| 2020 | Good-Bye | Shūji Tajima | Lead role | |
| 2020 | Food Luck | Minoru Ozaki | Special appearance | |
| 2020 | The Untold Tale of the Three Kingdoms | Liu Bei | Lead role | |
| 2021 | Kiba: The Fangs of Fiction | Teruya Hayami | Lead role | |
| 2021 | Asakusa Kid | Senzaburō Fukami | Lead role | |
| 2021 | Good Luck! Team Nacs: Movie Version | Himself | Lead role | |
| 2022 | Phases of the Moon | Tsuyoshi Osanai | Lead role | |
| 2023 | Mom, Is That You?! | Akio | | |
| 2024 | Detective Conan: The Million Dollar Pentagram | Yoshihisa Kawazoe (voice) | | |
| 2024 | Dear Family | Nobumasa Tsuboi | Lead role | |
| 2025 | Muromachi Outsiders | Hasuda Hyōe | Lead role | |
| 2025 | Blank Canvas: My So-Called Artist's Journey | Kenzō Hidaka | | |
| 2025 | The Last Man: The Movie – First Love | Shintarō Godō | | |
| 2026 | Bye Bye Love: Detective Is in the Bar | The Detective | Lead role | |

=== TV dramas ===
| Year | Title | Role | Notes | Ref. |
|---|---|---|---|---|
| 2005 | Emergency Room 24 Hours 3 | Ryōta Sakura | | |
| 2006 | Okashina Futari | Sakuragi | Lead role, miniseries | |
| 2006 | Doctor in Love | Sōta Numazu | | |
| 2006 | Tokyo Tower: Mom and Me, and Sometimes Dad | Masaya Nakagawa | Lead role, TV movie | |
| 2007 | The Pride of the Temp | Takeshi Shōji | | |
| 2007 | Wild Mom | Tetsu Kawano | | |
| 2008 | The Naminori Restaurant | Kenji Sazanami | | |
| 2009 | Akahana No Sensei | Santarō Ishihara | Lead role | |
| 2010 | Ryōmaden | Kondō Chōjirō | Taiga drama | |
| 2010 | Wagaya no Rekishi | Tsuru-chan | Miniseries | |
| 2010 | The Golden Piggy | Ichirō Kadomatsu | | |
| 2010 | Japanese Americans | Noboru Yamagishi | | |
| 2012 | Lucky Seven | Junpei Asahi | | |
| 2015 | Mare | Tōru Tsumura | Asadora | |
| 2016 | Sanada Maru | Sanada Nobuyuki | Taiga drama | |
| 2017 | Leaders 2 | Takejirō Kikuma | Special appearance, TV movie | |
| 2018 | Kuroido Goroshi | Dr. Heisuke Shiba | TV movie | |
| 2018 | Brother and Sister | Inosuke | Lead role, TV movie | |
| 2019 | No Side Manager | Hayato Kimishima | Lead role | |
| 2019 | Stay Tuned! | Masayoshi Kanbara | Miniseries | |
| 2019 | Natsuzora: Natsu's Sky | Hiroshi Matsutake | Cameo, Asadora | |
| 2020 | The Pride of the Temp 2 | Takeshi Shōji | Special appearance | |
| 2022 | The 13 Lords of the Shogun | Minamoto no Yoritomo | Taiga drama | |
| 2022 | My Ex-Boyfriend's Last Will | Keitarō Shinoda | | |
| 2023 | The Last Man: The Blind Profiler | Shintarō Godō | | |
| 2025 | Just a Bit Espers | Bunta | Lead role | |
| 2026 | Hakone Ekiden: Our Story | Ryo Tokushige | Lead role | |

=== Japanese dub ===
| Year | Title | Role | Notes | Ref. |
|---|---|---|---|---|
| 2018 | The Grinch | The Grinch | | |
| 2023 | Lyle, Lyle, Crocodile | Lyle | | |

=== Variety shows ===
- How do you like Wednesday? (水曜どうでしょう,1996~2002, Hokkaidō Television Broadcasting)
- Onigiri Atatamemasuka (おにぎりあたためますか, 2003~, Hokkaidō Television Broadcasting)
- Hanatare Nacs (ハナタレナックス, 2003~, Hokkaidō Television Broadcasting)
- Ippachi ikouyo (1×8いこうよ, 2000~, Sapporo Television Broadcasting)
- Songs (2017~, NHK)

=== Video games ===
- Professor Layton and the Curious Village (2007) – Professor Layton
- Professor Layton and the Diabolical Box (2007) – Professor Layton
- Professor Layton and the Unwound Future (2008) – Professor Layton
- Professor Layton and the Last Specter (2009) – Professor Layton
- Ni No Kuni (2010) – Swaine
- Professor Layton and the Miracle Mask (2011) – Professor Layton
- Professor Layton vs. Phoenix Wright: Ace Attorney (2012) – Professor Layton
- Professor Layton and the Azran Legacy (2013) – Professor Layton
- Professor Layton and the New World of Steam (2026) – Professor Layton

=== Others ===
- 66th NHK Kōhaku Uta Gassen (2015, NHK), judge
- 71st NHK Kōhaku Uta Gassen (2020, NHK), the white team captain
- The Masked Singer Japan (2021, Amazon Prime Video), MC
- 72nd NHK Kōhaku Uta Gassen (2021, NHK), host
- 73rd NHK Kōhaku Uta Gassen (2022, NHK), host
- Everyone's Best Kouhaku 100th Anniversary of Broadcasting Special (NHK, 2025) (host)

== Discography ==
- "Today's Soup" (本日のスープ, duet song with Stardust Revue in 2004)
- "Not Get Up Guy" (起きないあいつ, duet song with Shigeyuki Totsugi in 2004)

== Awards and nominations ==
| Year | Award | Category | Work(s) | Result | Ref. |
|---|---|---|---|---|---|
| 2012 | 35th Japan Academy Film Prize | Best Actor | Phone Call to the Bar | Nominated | |
| 2015 | 58th Blue Ribbon Awards | Best Actor | Kakekomi | Won | |
| 2016 | 39th Japan Academy Film Prize | Best Actor | Kakekomi | Nominated | |
| 2018 | 41st Japan Academy Film Prize | Best Actor | The Last Shot in the Bar | Nominated | |
| 2023 | 46th Japan Academy Film Prize | Best Actor | Phases of the Moon | Nominated | |
| 2023 | 36th Nikkan Sports Film Awards | Best Actor | Phases of the Moon | Nominated | |
| 2024 | 66th Blue Ribbon Awards | Best Supporting Actor | Mom, Is That You?! | Nominated | |
| 2024 | 47th Japan Academy Film Prize | Best Supporting Actor | Mom, Is That You?! | Nominated | |
