= Natsuzora =

Japanese television drama series

- Original title: なつぞら
- Genre: Drama
- Written by: Sumio Ōmori
- Directed by: Takafumi Kimura; Tadashi Tanaka; Tetsuya Watanabe; Kenji Tanaka; Daisuke Futami; Kuniome Hashizume; Makoto Yabe
- Starring: Suzu Hirose; Nanako Matsushima; Naohito Fujiki; Masaki Okada; Asuka Kudoh; Ken Yasuda; Ryo Yoshizawa; Taishi Nakagawa; Yūki Yamada; Arata Iura; Shihori Kanjiya; Atsuko Takahata; Masao Kusakari
- Narrated by: Teruyoshi Uchimura
- Opening theme: "Yasashii ano Ko" by Spitz
- Composer: Yukari Hashimoto
- Country of origin: Japan
- Original language: Japanese
- No. of episodes: 156

Production
- Executive producers: Tomoaki Iso; Toshitake Fukuoka
- Producer: Shunpei Murayama
- Running time: 15 minutes
- Production company: NHK

Original release
- Network: NHK
- Release: April 1 – September 28, 2019

Natsuzora (なつぞら) is a Japanese television drama series and the 100th Memorial Asadora series, following Manpuku. It premiered on April 1, 2019, and concluded on September 28, 2019. The story is loosely based on the life of animator Reiko Okuyama.

== Plot ==
As Natsu's parents were dead, she was raised by her father's old friend Takeo Shibata in Tokachi Hokkaido. At first Natsu was not recognized as a member of the Shibata family, but gradually gains Taijū Shibata's trust by her efforts. Natsu learns a lot from him and he has a great influence on her life.

But Natsu decides to go to Tokyo to be an animator.

== Cast ==
=== Natsu's family ===
- Suzu Hirose as Natsu Okuhara (based on Reiko Okuyama)
  - Sari Awano as young Natsu
- Masaki Okada as Saitarō Okuhara, Natsu's brother
  - Ao Watanabe as young Saitarō
- Kaya Kiyohara as Chiharu Okuhara, Natsu's sister
  - Noa Tanaka as young Chiharu
- Naho Toda as Natsu's mother (cameo)
- Teruyoshi Uchimura as Natsu's father (cameo)

=== Hokkaido and Tokachi people ===
==== Shibata ranch ====
- Masao Kusakari as Taijū Shibata, Shibata Ranch owner
- Nanako Matsushima as Fujiko Shibata, Natsu's foster mother
- Naohito Fujiki as Takeo Shibata, Natsu's foster father
- Shō Kiyohara as Teruo Shibata, Takeo's son
  - Ryōtarō Okajima as young Teruo
- Momoko Fukuchi as Yumiko Shibata, Takeo's eldest daughter
  - Rian Arakawa as young Yumiko
- Yui Narumi as Akemi Shibata, Takeo's youngest daughter
  - Nanaka Hirao as young Akemi
  - Moeka Yoshida as child Akemi
- Takashi Kobayashi as Yūkichi Tomura, Shibata Ranch's employee
- Takuma Otoo (TEAM-NACS) as Kikusuke Tomura, Yūkichi's son

==== Setsugetsu pastry shop ====
- Ken Yasuda (TEAM-NACS) as Yukinosuke Obata, the pastry's shopkeeper
- Atsuko Takahata as Toyo Obata, Yukinosuke's mother
- Nobuko Sendō as Taeko Obata, Yukinosuke's wife
- Yūki Yamada as Yukijirō Obata, Yukinosuke and Taeko's son

==== Yamada family ====
- Ryo Yoshizawa as Ten'yō Yamada, Natsu's friend (based on Kanda Nissho)
- Shigeyuki Totsugi (TEAM-NACS) as Seiji Yamada, Ten'yō's father
- Ayako Kobayashi as Tami Yamada, Ten'yō's mother
- Sakurako Ohara as Yasue Yamada, Ten'yō's wife
- Atsuhiro Inukai as Yōhei Yamada, Ten'yō's brother

=== Tōyō Animation ===
- Shihori Kanjiya as Mako Ōsawa
- Arata Iura as Tsutomu Naka (based on Yasuji Mori)
- Shōta Sometani as Kōya Kamiji (based on Hayao Miyazaki)
- Taishi Nakagawa as Kazuhisa Sakaba (based on Isao Takahata), Natsu's husband
- Akira Kawashima (Kirin) as Katsumi Shimoyama
- Mayu Watanabe as Akane Mimura
- Houka Kinoshita as Shigehiko Tsuyuki
- Rikka Ihara as Momoyo Morita
- Shinya Kote as Noboru Idohara
- Takuzō Kadono as Mitsuru Ōsugi (based on Hiroshi Ōkawa)
- Ryuta Furuya as Shuzaburo Yamakawa
- Satoshi Hashimoto as Kosuke Arai

=== Others ===
- Asuka Kudo as Nobuya Sasaoka
- Takeo Nakahara as Yaichirō Agawa
- Kie Kitano as Sara Agawa, Yoichirō's daughter
- Miu Tomita as Yoshiko Imura, Natsu's classmate
- Shunya Itabashi as Susumu Kadokura
- Tasuku Emoto as Ryūichi Kurata, Natsu's high school teacher
- Yoshimasa Kondo as Kenya Nogami
- Manami Higa as Kōko Maejima
- Hiromi Iwasaki (cameo)
- Sanae Kitabayashi (cameo)
- Tomoko Yamaguchi as Ayami Kishikawa
- Kōichi Yamadera as Yūsei Toyotomi (based on Hisaya Morishige)
- Anju Suzuki as Ranko Kameyama (based on Mariko Miyagi)
- Hideko Hara as Nahoko Mitsuyama
- Hiroyuki Morisaki (TEAM-NACS) as Hiroshi Ōshimizu
- Kaho Mizutani as Sachiko Mihashi
- Tsutomu Sekine as Kazunao Sakaba, Kazuhisa's father
- Mihoko Fujita as Sato Sakaba, Kazuhisa's mother
- Mana Mikura as Michiko Sasaoka
- Yūko Tanaka as Dr. Takahashi (cameo)
- Ema Fujisawa as a pregnant woman (cameo)
- Mayumi Tanaka as Murakawa, and the voice of Ushiwakamaru
- Miki Narahashi as the voice of Annie
- Mitsuaki Madono as the voice of Kick Jaguar
- Miyuki Sawashiro as Chikako Shiramoto (based on Kazuko Sugiyama)
- Sakura Ando as the narrator of Sora, the Prairie Girl
- Yōko Asaji as Masako Sugiyama
- Yo Oizumi (TEAM-NACS) as Hiroshi Matsutake (cameo)

Preceded by Manpuku	Asadora; April 1, 2019 – September 28, 2019	Succeeded by Scarlet
