= Takayuki Suzui =

Japanese film director and screenwriter

- 鈴井 貴之
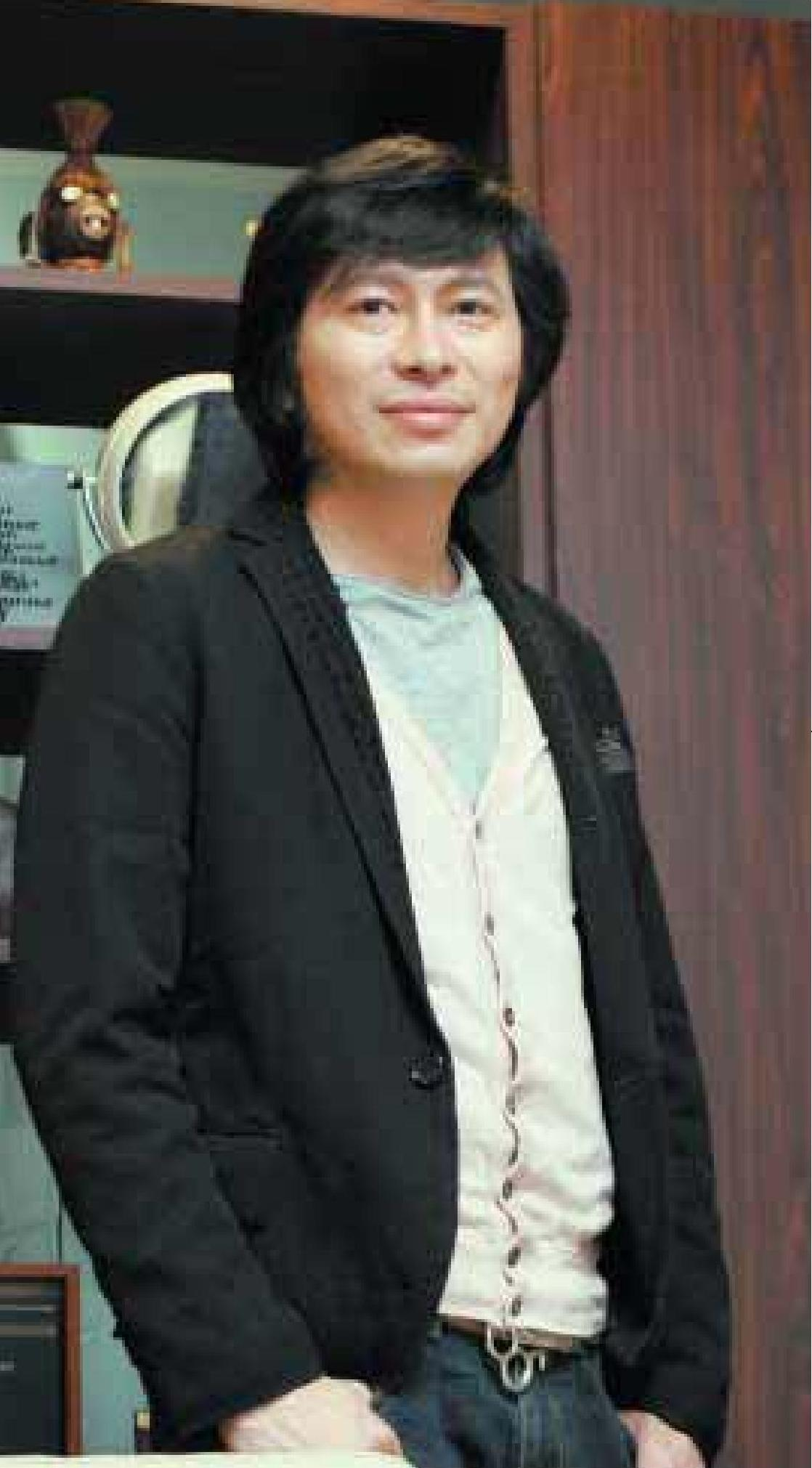
- Born: 6 May 1962 (age 64); Akabira, Hokkaido, Japan
- Occupations: Actor; tarento; film director; broadcast writer
- Agent: Creative Office Cue
- Notable work: Go-i-s; man-hole; river; Gin no Angel
- Television: How do you like Wednesday?; Mosaic Nights; Dorabara Suzui no Su; 1×8 Ikou yo!

Takayuki Suzui (鈴井 貴之, Suzui Takayuki; born 6 May 1962) is a tarento who mainly works in Hokkaido, film director and broadcast writer. He is the chairman of Board of Directors of Creative Office Cue Co., Ltd., and the Board of Cure Products Co., Ltd., and Manhole Film Limited. He is nicknamed Mister (ミスター, Misutā). His ex-wife is Creative Office Cue President Ayumi Ito.

== Directorial works ==
=== Films ===
Year	Title	Lead actor
2001	man-hole	Ken Yasuda
2003	river	Yo Oizumi
2004	Gin no Angel	Fumiyo Kohinata
2009	Gin Iro no Ame	Kento Kaku

=== TV dramas ===
Year	Title	Network	Lead actor	Notes
2008	Loss:Time:Life	CX	Tomochika	Episode 3 "Sukiyaki"
2015	Fuben na Benri-ya	TX	Masaki Okada	

=== Stage ===
Date	Title	Lead actor
Oct 2010	Cut	Takashi Ukaji

== Filmography ==
=== TV programmes ===
Hokkaido Television Broadcasting

Date	Title	Notes
	Shūkan Nan da! Can da!	
4 Apr 1994 – 30 Sep 1996	Mosaic Nights/Mosaic Nights V3	Regular appearances, planning, composition
9 Oct 1996 – 18 May 2011	How do you like Wednesday?	planning, appeared
5 Jan 1999 – 5 May 2004	How do you like Returns	planning, composition, appeared
9 Apr 1999 – Mar 2001	Suzui no Su	planning, composition, appeared
Apr 2001 – Jan 2002	Suzui no Su presents n×u×k×i	planning, composition, appeared
1 Feb 2002 – 23 Dec 2004	Dorabara Suzui no Su	Screenplay, appeared
25 Mar 2003 –	Onigiri atatamemasu ka	On-air, planning
Apr 2003 – Sep 2006	Popcorn Cinema	
14 Jul 2004 – 22 Apr 2009	How do you like Wednesday? Classic	Planning, appeared

Sapporo Television Broadcasting

Dates	Title	Notes
1992	Drama City '92 Ima mo Tomodachi imasu ka?	Broadcast production nationwide broadcast; starring Sayuri Kokushō as fiancé
9 Jan 2000 –	1×8 Ikou yo!	On-air, composition
2006	Sta+α	

Hokkaido Cultural Broadcasting

Date	Title	Notes
	TV Cruise Pukapuka	Appeared in mini conte and mini drama Ai no Kariudo-Also with Nozomu Masuzawa, directed and photographed by Takanori Yoshio
	Nippon Pukapuka	Appeared with the above successor programme, MC
13 Sep 1997	Kita no Symphony	Documentary drama with theme of Akira Ifukube; Suzui played his elder brother, Isao

Hokkaido Broadcasting

Dates	Title	Notes
	Toshiba Nichiyō Gekijō Haikei, Otoko-tachi e (4): Tatakaitai Otoko-tachi	Broadcast production nationwide broadcast; starring Ryuzo Hayashi as piercing stabber
8 Mar 1992	Toshiba Nichiyō Gekijō Hakka no Kaze Fuku Machi de	Broadcast production nationwide broadcast; starring Keizō Kanie as a city official staff member grabbed by Kokura
1992 – 30 Sep 1993	Pack 2	Reproduction video

NHK Sapporo Broadcasting Station

Dates	Title
26 Aug 2011	Takayuki Suzui: Genten Kaiki
2013–14	Takayuki Suzui: A-dō-venture!

TV Tokyo

Dates	Title	Notes
Apr–Jun 2015	Drama 24 Fuben na Benri-ya	Director

Fuji Television

Title	Notes
Kenka no Hanamichi	Played in a couple in "Shirōto"; However, this time has not been broadcast in the Hokkaido area due to the intention of the couple

BS Fuji

Title	Notes
Ooizu Minminzemi	Within "TV Lab"

Channel Neco

Dates	Title	Notes
Oct 2006	Project Cue Takayuki Suzuki no Film Jamboree	3 films and making, broadcast mini programme "Takayuki Suzui no RokeHan." visiting a location in Hokkaido.
Feb, Mar 2006	Takayuki Suzui no RokeHan. Fuyu-hen	
Oct, Nov 2007	Takayuki Suzui no RokeHan. Natsu-hen	
Sep 2008 –	Choku Cue! Shōbu Mezase! Hokkaido Kanzen Seifuku!?	On-air

Tokyo MX

Date	Title	Notes
21 Sep 2012	5-Ji ni Muchū!	Bureau fellows gathered outside the fans and studio

=== Radio programmes ===
Air-G'

Title
Blamdnew Blue
Go-i-s
King Go-i-s
Home&Away
FM Rock Kids
Takayuki Suzui: Radio no Jikan

Date FM

Title	Notes
Kitakaze Kozō	Tohoku 6 prefecture block network

=== Films ===
Year	Title
	Enoji Guchi
1996	Gamera 2: Attack of Legion
2002	The Cat Returns

=== Stage ===
Date	Title	Location
9 Dec 2010	Love Letters	Parco Theater
11 Feb 2012	Love Letters	Asahi Sunrise Hall
10 Mar 2012	Love Letters	Parco Theater

== Discography ==
Date	Title	As	Label	Notes
21 Apr 1995		Da.Be.Sa / North End X Ayumi (from Sapporo)	Epic Sony	CD code was ESDB-3562; he wrote an sang; "Ayumi" is his wife Ayumi Suzui (Creative Office Cue president); See also East End X Yuri
2001	"Oya-G", "Soft Focus"	KenTackayucky Fried Jiken	Indie	Suzui (Beauty Taka, Vo) and Ken Yasuda (After Ken, G) duo

== Bibliography ==
Year	Title	Publisher	ISBN
2004	Gin no Angel: Deaenai 5 Maime o Sagashite	Gentosha	ISBN 978-4344007239
2007	Gagaku Sentai White Stones	Gentosha	ISBN 978-4344014312
2009	Dame Ningen–Tameiki Bakari no Seishunki	Media Factory	ISBN 978-4840128957
2010	Dame Dame Ningen: Soredemo Hashiri Tsuzuketa Han Seiki	Media Factory	ISBN 978-4840135023

== See also ==
- Hokkaido Television Broadcasting (TV Asahi affiliate in Hokkaido. Many programmes are planning and appearing)

=== Creative Office Cue affiliated tarentos ===
- TEAM NACS
  - Hiroyuki Morisaki
  - Ken Yasuda
  - Shigeyuki Totsugi
  - Yo Oizumi
  - Takuma Otoo
- Mashiro Ayano

=== Other people involved ===
- Daigo (musician) (He directed his first music video in "Daisy")
