= Team Nacs =

Japanese musical group

TEAM NACS チーム・ナックス
- Origin: Hokkaido, Japan
- Genres: J-pop
- Years active: 1996 –
- Members: Hiroyuki Morisaki; Ken Yasuda; Shigeyuki Totsugi; Yo Oizumi; Takuma Otoo
- Website: TEAM NACS Official Site

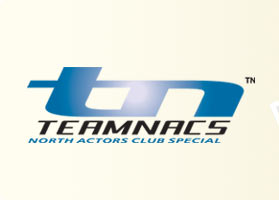
Logo of TEAM NACS

TEAM NACS (Japanese: チーム・ナックス) is a Japanese theatrical and musical unit that was formed in 1996 by Hiroyuki Morisaki, Ken Yasuda, Shigeyuki Totsugi, Yo Oizumi, and Takuma Otoo. It is often called NACS (ナックス). Prior to October 2005, the group name was formerly TEAM-NACS. They belong to Creative Office Cue, an entertainment agency located in Sapporo, Hokkaido. They have a business alliance with Amuse Inc., a major entertainment agency in Tokyo, and have adopted a system that "Amuse handles all the work in the national wards other than Hokkaido".

The group was formed by five members of the Hokkai Gakuen University Theater Study Group. It was disbanded shortly after its formation due to the employment of its members, but it was reunited in 1997. After that, they performed on stage in Hokkaido. In Hokkaido, except for performances, he was mainly active as a local talent group appearing in late-night programs.

In May 2004, he performed his first performance in Tokyo with "LOOSER-Ushinai Tsuzuketa Album-", and in April – September 2005, he performed his first national tour performance in "COMPOSER-Hibikitsuzukeru Senritsu no Shirabe-".

Currently, in addition to activities as a unit, activities as actors and celebrity of each member are also actively carried out, and its name recognition has become a national district. In the national district, individual activities are the main activity, and everyone gathers mainly during the main performance of the stage, which is held once every three years, and the location of the local program "Hanatare NACS" in Hokkaido.

Currently, it is said to be "the theater company that cannot get the best tickets in Japan" and has established popularity in the national ward.

"NACS" was a "derogatory name" that was called by separating the five people who stood out among the theater study groups from the theater study group. It comes from the fact that when Morisaki played the role of "Knox" in the play of the drama study group, he pronounced it with all his might, so he heard it as "Nacs". "North Actors Club Special" on the once-used logo is a backronym.

== Member ==
All member are from Hokkaido, Japan. Also, all members are married and have children.

- Hiroyuki Morisaki (14 November 1971 (age 54)) – Leader
- Ken Yasuda (8 December 1973 (age 52)) – Sub leader
- Shigeyuki Totsugi (7 November 1973 (age 52))
- Yo Oizumi (3 April 1973 (age 52))
- Takuma Otoo (21 March 1976 (age 49))

== Biography ==
On 7 March 1996, "LETTER-Kawaritsudukeru Vector no Syoheki-" was performed as a graduation work of Morisaki and Yasuda who graduated from the university by five people who belonged to the theater study group of Hokkai Gakuen University at that time and were close friends. Formed as a one-time unit for "LETTER". In addition, he appeared in the matchmaking project of Hokkaido Television Broadcasting "Mosaic Night V3" with the promotion of "LETTER-Kawaritsudukeru Vector no Syoheki-", and all the members have made their first TV appearance.

TEAM NACS disbanded when Morisaki and Yasuda graduated from university, and Morisaki and Yasuda got a job at the company, but retired from the company in 9–10 months. So, reunited with Morisaki's call in August 1997, "RECOVER-Egakitsuzukeru Mouhitotsu no Ketsuron-". After the reunion, it officially started as a theater unit in 1998 with "FEVER-Nagametsuzuketa Mouhitotsu no Tenbou-".

In 2002, people who were not interested in theater came to visit to see Oizumi after the hit of "How Do You Like Wednesday?", in which Oizumi was regular, Yasuda was semi-regular, and other members also appeared as guests. In "WAR-Tatakai Tsuduketa Heitachi no Hokori-", the number of spectators increased, and the performance became overwhelmingly popular in Hokkaido in the early 2000s, such as mobilizing 9,500 people, which is unusual in Hokkaido where the theater culture is not active.

However, at that time, Ayumi Suzui, the vice president of the affiliated office, said, "The capital investment for terrestrial digitalization will be a burden, and the local stations will not be able to use enough funds to make programs." With a sense of crisis, "activities cannot fully develop their abilities," he sought to expand nationwide. After that, I watched the 2002 performance "WAR-Tatakai Tsuduketa Heitachi no Hokori-"" and received an invitation from the producer Kazuhiko Yamamoto of the Sunshine Theater to perform a stage.

In May 2004, they performed for the first time in Tokyo with "LOOSER-Ushinai Tsuduketa Album-" and made his first foray into Tokyo.In addition, on 15 December 2004, a business alliance was formed with a major entertainment agency, Amuse Inc., and after that, the work in Hokkaido will be handled by CREATIVE OFFICE CUE, and the work outside Hokkaido will be handled by Amuse.

Oizumi made his first appearance in a TV drama produced by a key station in "Kyumei Byoto 24ji (3rd series)" produced by Fuji TV, which was broadcast from January to March 2005. Since then, the members have been active nationwide, such as appearing in TV dramas and movies produced by key stations in Tokyo.

Also, from April to August 2005, he will perform a national tour of Japan for the first time with "COMPOSER-Hibikitsudukeru Senritsu no Shirabe-". After that, until "Shimoarai Kyodai no Spring Has Come" in 2009, the stage performances were held at intervals of two years. And after 2012's "WARRIOR-Utaitsudukeru Samurai Roman-", the stage performances are held all over Japan at intervals of three years.

== Filmography ==
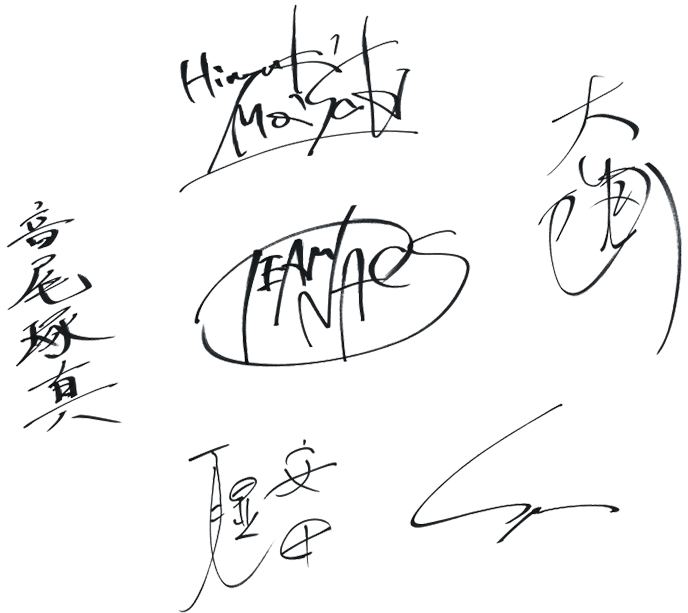
Sign of TEAM NACS In clockwise order:Hiroyuki Morisaki, Yo Oizumi, Shigeyuki Totsugi, Ken Yasuda, Takuma Otoo

Describe the works in which all the members appeared. For items in which members appear alone, see the section for each individual.

Bold is starring.

=== Stage ===
- LETTER-Kawaritsudukeru Vector no Syoheki-（1996）
- RECOVER-Egakitsudukeru Mouhitotsu no Ketsuron-（1997）
- FEVER-Nagametsuduketa Mouhitotsu no Tenbou-（1997）
- DOOR-Aritsudukerutame no Process-（1998）
- ESCAPER-Sagashitsuduketeita Basyo-（1999）
- FOUR-Motometsuduketa Yatsura no Kakumei-（2000）
- LOVER-Omoitsuduketa Kimi eno Okurimono-（2001）
- WAR-Tatakaitsuduketa Heitachino Hokori-（2002）
- Miharu（2003）
- LOOSER-Ushinai Tsuduketa Album-（2004）
- COMPOSER-Hibikitsudukeru Senritsu no Shirabe-（2005）
- HONOR-Mamoritsuduketa Itami to Tomoni-（2007）
- Shimoarai Kyodai no Spring Has Come（2009）
- WARRIOR-Utaitsudukeru Samurai Roman-（2012）
- Akudo（2015）
- PARAMUSHIR-Shinjitsuduketa Shikon-（2018）
- Masterpiece-Kessaku wo Kimini-（2021）

=== TV dramas ===
- Sikoku R-14（2001, HTB）
- Soup Corry（2012, HBC/TBS）
- "The TEAM NACS perfect show" ~ Why at such a time ~ (2014, CX)
- Fuben na Benriya (2015, TX)
- Channel wa Sonomama! (2019, HTB)
- Asadora「Natsuzora」 (2019, NHK)

=== Movie ===
- man-hole (2001)
- Pakodatejinn (2002)
- river (2003)
- TEAM NACS FILMS「N43°」 (2009) – Also all member are in charge of director and screenplay.
- Giniro no Ame (2009)

=== Variety Shows ===
- How Do You Like Wednesday? (1996 – 2002, HTB)
- Dorabara Suzui no Su（2002 – 2004, HTB）
- HanatareNACS（2003 –, HTB）
- TyoCUE Syobu (2008 –, Channel NECO)
- Ganbare! TEAM NACS (2021, Wowow)

=== Radio Programs ===
- NACS GOTTA ME! (2001 – 2005, AIR-G')

=== TV Anime ===
- ChibiNACS (2006 – 2008, STV)

=== Puppet Show ===
- Monkeyperm (2013 – 2015, TVK etc)

=== Voice acting roles ===
- Howl's Moving Castle (2004)
- When Marnie Was There (2014)

== Discography ==
- NACS Hurricane/Nenzashita Kimi (ナックスハリケーン/捻挫した君) (2004)
