= Rakugo Eiga =

- Film poster
- Kanji: らくごえいが
- Directed by: Mikihiro Endō; Issei Matsui; Yūichirō Sakashita
- Written by: Rei Tsuruga; Shūji Saga; Takerō Uragami
- Produced by: Takeshi Tanaka
- Starring: Takayuki Yamada; Takako Katou; Ken Yasuda; Tsubasa Honda; Yumika Tajima
- Cinematography: Erika Shimizu; Ryō Saitō; Juntarō Atochi 陳畑君
- Edited by: Youkou Izumi; Ryōta Nakanishi; Mitsuki Sakugawa; Kouki Ebata
- Music by: HARCO
- Production companies: Tokyo University of the Arts Graduate School of Film and New Media; Eisei Gekijō; Rights Apartment Inc. Amuse Inc. Revamp Inc. Earl Grey Film Inc.
- Distributed by: Earl Grey Film Inc.
- Release dates: December 14, 2012 (LA EigaFest); April 6, 2013
- Running time: 110 minutes
- Country: Japan
- Language: Japanese

Rakugo Eiga (らくごえいが) is a 2012 Japanese omnibus film directed by Mikihiro Endō, Issei Matsui, and Yūichirō Sakashita. In 2017, this film was nominated for International Emmy Awards in Comedy.

== Cast ==
"Before After"

- Yumika Tajima as Karuho Hayashida
- Takuma Otoo as Karuho's boss
- Shigeru Saiki as Karuho's father

"Life Rate"

- Takayuki Yamada as a man dealt with Death
- Ken Yasuda as Death
- Tsubasa Honda as a woman aspiring a writer

"Sarugoke ha Tsuraiyo"

- Takako Katou as a movie producer
- Shigeyuki Totsugi as a movie director
- Kenji Murakami
