= Gamera 2: Attack of Legion =

1996 film by Shūsuke Kaneko

- Theatrical release poster

Japanese name
- Kanji: ガメラ2 レギオン襲来
Transcriptions
- Revised Hepburn: Gamera Tsū Region Shūrai
- Directed by: Shusuke Kaneko
- Screenplay by: Kazunori Ito
- Produced by: Tsutomu Tsuchikawa; Myuki Nanri; Naoki Sato; Satoyuki Minami; Tetsuya Ikeda; Takeyoshi Hosaka; Hideko Sawada; Tadamaza Tsuruta; Kazuto Kojima; Kazuhiro Igarashi
- Starring: Maki Mizuno; Toshiyuki Nagashima; Tamotsu Ishibashi
- Cinematography: Junichi Tozawa
- Edited by: Shizuo Arakawa
- Music by: Kow Otani
- Production companies: Daiei Film; Tokuma Shoten; Nippon TV; Hakuhodo Production
- Distributed by: Toho
- Release date: 13 July 1996 (Japan)
- Running time: 100 minutes
- Country: Japan
- Language: Japanese
- Budget: $5 million
- Box office: $6.5 million

Gamera 2: Attack of Legion (ガメラ2 レギオン襲来, Gamera Tsū Region Shūrai; lit. 'Gamera 2: Invasion of Legion') (Note: Also known as Gamera 2: Advent of Legion and Gamera 2: Assault of Legion) is a 1996 Japanese kaiju film directed by Shusuke Kaneko, with special effects by Shinji Higuchi. Produced by Daiei Film and distributed by Toho, the film is the 10th entry in the Gamera film series, as well as the second film in the franchise's Heisei period, serving as a direct sequel to the 1995 film Gamera: Guardian of the Universe. The film stars Toshiyuki Nagashima, Miki Mizuno, Tamotsu Ishibashi, and Mitsuru Fukikoshi, with Ayako Fujitani and Yukijirō Hotaru reprising their roles from the previous film, and with Akira Ohashi portraying the titular monster Gamera.

Gamera 2: Attack of Legion also features Mizuho Yoshida as Legion Queen, the leader of a race of insectoid silicon-based extraterrestrials that invade Earth, prompting Gamera to come to the planet's defense. The film was released theatrically in Japan on July 13, 1996, and was followed by Gamera 3: Revenge of Iris in 1999.

A variety series How Do You Like Wednesday? is largely inspired by the trilogy, and several music and telops and formats used for trailers and various scenes of the program are reused from the trilogy. As the film features Hokkaido, Yō Ōizumi, Takayuki Suzui, and Ken Yasuda appeared as extras, making it the first film career for Ōizumi.

== Plot ==
One year after the battle between Gamera and the Gyaos, (Note: As depicted in Gamera: Guardian of the Universe. (1995)) a large meteor crashes in Hokkaido. The Japan Ground Self-Defense Force (JGSDF), led by colonel Yusuke Watarase, investigate the crash site; unbeknown to the investigation team, several insect-like extraterrestrial creatures have emerged from the meteor. Meanwhile, a series of telecommunication failures garners the attention of NTT, whose engineers discover that the underground lines in the affected area have been completely removed. Network engineer Obitsu notices that the missing cables form a straight path that head south from the crash site.

The creatures make their way to the city of Sapporo, where they attack Sapporo Municipal Subway and make a hive in the subway tunnels. When Watarase and a team of JGSDF soldiers enter the tunnel to investigate, a large pod-like structure emerges from the ground. Watarase then discovers that the pod is dramatically increasing the oxygen levels in the surrounding area. Watarase then teams up with Obitsu and Miss Honami, a science instructor; the three realize that the pod is a biological launch pad that will shoot a seed into space to colonize another planet, with the increased oxygen levels helping to increase the explosion of the launch.

The three also realize that any attempt to destroy the pod will also result in the destruction of Sapporo. With the seed about to launch, Gamera rises from the ocean and flies to Sapporo. Gamera uproots the pod before it can launch, but is then swarmed by the creatures and is forced to retreat. After Gamera flies away, a large creature emerges from underground to start another hive, with one of Watarase's soldiers Hanatani dubbing the creatures "Legion".

The Legion makes their way to Sendai to start a second hive. Watarase orders Honami to evacuate the city; as she is evacuating she runs into Asagi Kusanagi, a teenage schoolgirl who shares a psychic connection to Gamera. As Honami and Asagi's helicopter attempts to evacuate the Legion Queen and Gamera emerge and engage in a fight. The queen, having stalled nearly long enough for the pod to launch, severely injures Gamera and retreats back underground as Honami and Asagi escape, while Watarase orders his men to evacuate the city. Gamera manages to destroy the pod before it launches, but the resulting explosion destroys the city and seemingly kills Gamera in the blast.

Watarase, Obitsu, and Honami meet again and realize that the Legion are silicon-based creatures that are attracted to electromagnetic sources. They also realize that the Legion, having become desperate after two failed attempts, will target Tokyo next and will face little resistance due to the presumed death of Gamera. Honami returns to Sendai Station ruins to meet with Asagi to see if it's possible to revive Gamera. Asagi reaches out to Gamera and he is eventually revived, but the connection between him and Asagi is severed as her amulet shatters.

The Japanese prime minister orders the mobilization of all JSDF to cutoff the Legion before the swarm can reach Tokyo. Gamera fights the Legion Queen while the defense forces take down the smaller creatures with help from Obitsu and Watarase using a trap at a local power plant. Gamera rips off the queen's horns, seemingly defeating her; however, the queen rises and unleashes a new attack of laser whips that rip Gamera's flesh.

With the Legion Queen seemingly having gained the upper hand, Gamera draws upon the mana of humans from around the world and his chest opens up, revealing a plasma cannon. Gamera fires upon the queen, blowing her apart and killing her. As the soldiers watch Gamera fly off into the sky, Asagi tearfully bids him farewell.

== Cast ==
- Toshiyuki Nagashima as Yusuke Watarase, the colonel of Japan Self-Defense Force (JSDF), Japan Ground Self-Defense Force (JGSDF) Chemical School officer and one of the film's main protagonists.
- Miki Mizuno as Midori Honami, a curator at the Sapporo Science Center and one of the film's main protagonists.
- Tamotsu Ishibashi as Hanatani, the first lieutenant of JSDF.
- Mitsuru Fukikoshi as Obitsu, the engineer at NTT Hokkaido network operation center.
- Ayako Fujitani as Asagi Kusanagi, a schoolgirl with a psychic connection to Gamera and the film's secondary protagonist.
- Yûsuke Kawazu as Akio Nojiri, Honami's superior.
- Yukijirō Hotaru as Osako, the beer factory guardsman and former Fukuoka police officer who witnessed the encounter with Gyaos in the previous film.
- Akira Ohashi as Gamera, the titular turtle-like monster and one of the film's main protagonists.
- Mizuho Yoshida as Legion Queen, the leader of an alien species and the film's main antagonist.

== Production ==
The film began production in 1995. Shortly after it was announced A.D. Vision would give the first film a theatrical release, it was further announced that the sequel was now in post-production under the then working title of Gamera 2: Raygion Attacks with the first film's creative team returning.

The explosion of the Sapporo Municipal Subway by JSDF was inspired by the depictions of an elevator shaft and its destruction in the 1988 film Die Hard.

== Release ==
Gamera 2: Attack of Legion was released theatrically in Japan on July 13, 1996, where it was distributed by Toho. It was released directly to video on DVD in the United States in 2003 by ADV Films.

== Reception ==
The film was the first daikaiju film to win the Nihon SF Taisho Award (the Japanese Nebula Award) in 1996. This decision sparked a fierce debate in the Japanese Science Fiction community, with many critics arguing that it signaled the decline of Japanese SF literature.

== See also ==
- List of killer insect films
- Rebirth of Mothra II
- Godzilla vs. Megaguirus
