= Reiko Okuyama =

Japanese anime director (1936–2007)

- 奥山 玲子(Japanese)
- Born: October 26, 1936; Japan
- Died: May 6, 2007 (aged 70)
- Other name: Reiko Kotabe; Reiko Kitagawa
- Occupation: Animator
- Spouse: Yoichi Kotabe (m. 1963)

Reiko Okuyama (奥山 玲子, Okuyama Reiko; 26 October 1936 – 6 May 2007), née, was a Japanese animator, notable for being one of the first female Japanese animators. She has also been credited as Reiko Kotabe (小田部 玲子, Kotabe Reiko; on Hustle Punch episode 19) and Reiko Kitagawa (北川 玲子, Kitagawa Reiko; on Belladonna).

The 2019 asadora Natsuzora is loosely based on her life and career.

== Early life ==
Okuyama spent much of her early life confined to bed due to a series of illnesses. She developed her interest in drawing during this time.

After the end of World War II, she entered mission school. After graduation, she entered Tohoku University as per her father's wishes, but she eventually dropped out and left her home town to work in Tokyo.

She had various jobs in Tokyo. A few years later, her uncle referred her to a job at Toei Animation.

== Career ==
In 1957 Okuyama applied for a position with Toei Doga, mistakenly believing that they were publishers of children's books. Her drawing skills were enough for her to be hired as an in-betweener. Her first work was on the landmark feature-length anime Hakuja den (released in the US as The Tale of the White Serpent, 1958). She was promoted to second key animator on 1959's Shonen Sarutobi Sasuke (released as Magic Boy in the US), in spite of some sexual discrimination on the part of the studio heads.

Okuyama continued her work as second key animator for 1960's Saiyuki (released as Alakazam the Great in the US). Her primary role was to even out the stylistic differences between the work of Toei Doga's two top animators, Yasuji Mori and Akira Daikuhara.

Okuyama continued to work for Toei Doga until 1976, eventually rising to the position of head animator.

After briefly joining her husband at Nippon Animation, Okuyama went freelance, providing work for one last Toei film, 1979's Tatsu no ko Taro (released in the US as Taro the Dragon Boy). She has gone on to illustrate several children's books, and has taught animation at the Tokyo Designer Academy. In 1990, she contributed intaglio engraving-inspired artwork to Tadanari Okamoto's posthumously completed film The Restaurant of Many Orders (1991), finished under the supervision of Kihachirō Kawamoto. She participated in the animated project Winter Days in 2003. She then continued to produce animation until she died on May 6, 2007 (though her death was announced only in September, 2007).

== Personal life ==
In 1963, Okuyama married Yoichi Kotabe, a fellow animator. Okuyama gave birth to their first child shortly thereafter. On May 6, 2007, Okuyama died.

== See also ==
- Natsuzora, the 100th Asadora
