= Lip's =

Japanese idol group

- Genres: J-pop
- Years active: 1990–1993
- Labels: CBS Sony
- Past members: Takako Katō; Natsue Yoshimura; Kyoko Yamamoto

Lip's was a Japanese idol group formed in 1990 through the 1989 UCC Can Coffee "Miss Contest Grand Prix". Lip's consisted of Takako Katō, Natsue Yoshimura, and Kyoko Yamamoto. The group disbanded in 1993.

After being signed to CBS Sony, the group released its debut single, "Ai no Maryoku" (愛の魔力, Magical Power of Love), on March 21, 1990. The single peaked at number 43 on the Oricon Singles Chart and charted for four weeks. Another single called "Splendid Love" followed on June 1, 1990. It peaked at number 65 on the Oricon Singles Chart and charted for three weeks. Both "Ai no Maryoku" and "Splendid Love" were used as promotional songs for UCC Can Coffee commercials. The group's first album, Kore, Umaidjan (これ、うまいぢゃん, This is Good), was released on September 21, 1990. The album peaked at number 79 on the Oricon Albums Chart. In November 1990, Lip's teamed up with idol trio Rakutenshi and idol singer Rumi Shishido to form the special Christmas group Nanatsuboshi (七つ星, Seven Stars). They released a single in November 1990 and a holiday album on December 1, 1990.

Lip's released the single, "Aoi Sangoshō (Blue Lagoon Dance Mix)" (青い珊瑚礁〜ブルーラグーン・ダンス・ミックス, Blue Coral Reef ~Blue Lagoon Dance Mix), on August 1, 1991. The song was originally recorded by Seiko Matsuda in 1980. "Aoi Sangoshō (Blue Lagoon Dance Mix)" was used as the image song for Return to the Blue Lagoon promotions in Japan. Lip's final single, "Isogaba Maware!" (いそがばまわれ!, Slow and Steady Wins the Race!), was released on July 1, 1992. "Isogaba Maware!" was used as the theme song for Wowow's TV show Carmel.

Lip's disbanded in 1993. The members went on to pursue careers in acting, modelling, and music.
