= On-chan =

Mascot of Hokkaido Television Broadcasting

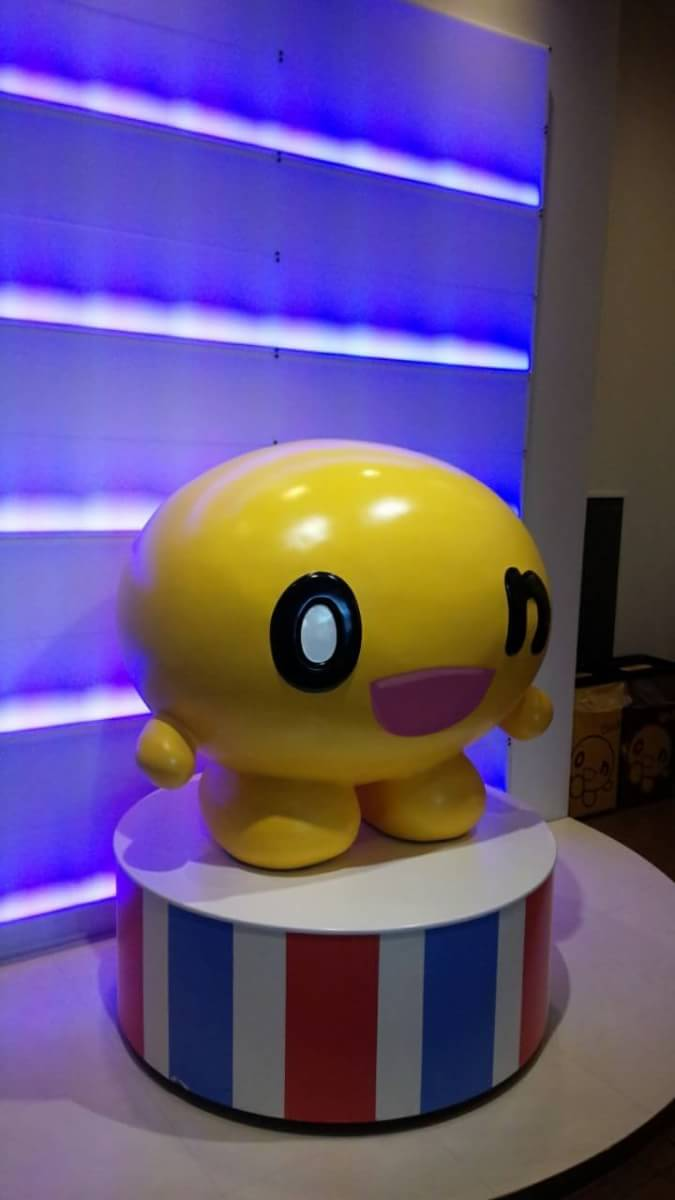
Statue of on-chan at the former HTB headquarters

On-chan (Japanese: onちゃん) is the mascot of Hokkaido Television Broadcasting, a commercial television station in Hokkaido. He was introduced in 1997.

== Overview ==
He is a Parade Alien who came from the "Parade Planet" (パレード星人), and his body looks like a crushed yellow sphere, with limbs and a mouth, and his eyes are shaped like an "o" on the right and an "n" on the left. He sometimes wears a small hat. The name has a positive image with meanings such as "Switch on!" (スイッチオン!) and "On Parade!" (onパレード!), and the design is easy to understand and familiar, and the yellow body has an image of energy and cuteness, giving it a cheerful feeling. He has a curious personality, is positive about everything, and says he wants to find exciting things and make more friends. Initially, the design was a combination of oval shapes, giving it a stiff impression, but it has since undergone minor changes to include freehand and expressive arrangements.

On-chan was created by a design company based in Sapporo, and was selected amongst the designs from various companies in Japan through a competition. He was officially introduced on December 1, 1997.

On-chan was planned to last for a year through HTB's 30th anniversary campaign titled On Parade!. After becoming a suit actor, the air costumes that appeared at events such as the Sapporo Snow Festival also attracted attention and received many inquiries from viewers. In July 1998, the test stuffed toys sold out at the 30th anniversary event of the company's opening were sold out, and merchandise sales began in earnest on August 1, proving so popular that 4,000 customers flocked to the Sapporo Underground HTB corner on the first day. In 1999, he was promoted to the mascot character of the entire station, and has continued to be active since then, and has a long-lasting existence as a character established not only by TV Asahi but also by broadcast stations nationwide. The characters's recognition also increased throughout Japan with the syndicated airing How Do You Like Wednesday? on some stations.

On-chan often substitutes "o" in Japanese words with "on" as a pun. In either case, the "on" prefix is written in katakana.

- こんばんは (konbanwa) → オンばんは (onbanwa)
- 今週から四国八十八ヶ所お遍路の旅がスタートいたします (Konshū kara shikokuhachijūhakkasho ohenji no tabi ga sutāto itashimasu) →オン週から四国八十八ヶ所オン遍路の旅がスターオンいたしますオン
- おめでとうございます→オンめでとうございます (on shū kara shikokuhachijūhakkasho on henro no tabi ga sutāon itashimasu on)
- お楽しみに (otanoshimini) → オン楽しみに (ontanoshimini)
- おしらせ (oshirase) → オンしらせ (onshirase)（used in on-chan's official blog onblo）
- お疲れ様です (otsukaresamadesu) → オン疲れ様です (ontsukaresamadesu)
- おはようございます (ohayou gozaimasu) → オンはようございます (onhayou gozaimasu)
- おやすみなさい (oyasuminasai) → オンやすみなさい (onyasuminasai)
  - These last two are pronounced by the announcer on the station's sign-on and sign-off videos since digitalization.

The "on-chan" mark is also used in the receiver display icon for digital terrestrial broadcasting (the station's logo is used as the watermark).

=== Other settings ===
The size is about the size of a basketball. He is a very glutton. Also, it is said that even if his clumsy personality makes him feel depressed, his inherent positivity quickly cheers him up.

=== Preferences ===
On-chan's favorite foods are cheese and corn. On the other hand, the things he doesn't like are crows and Hiroshi Oizumi, who slams on-chan.

== Main activities ==
=== Corporate activities ===
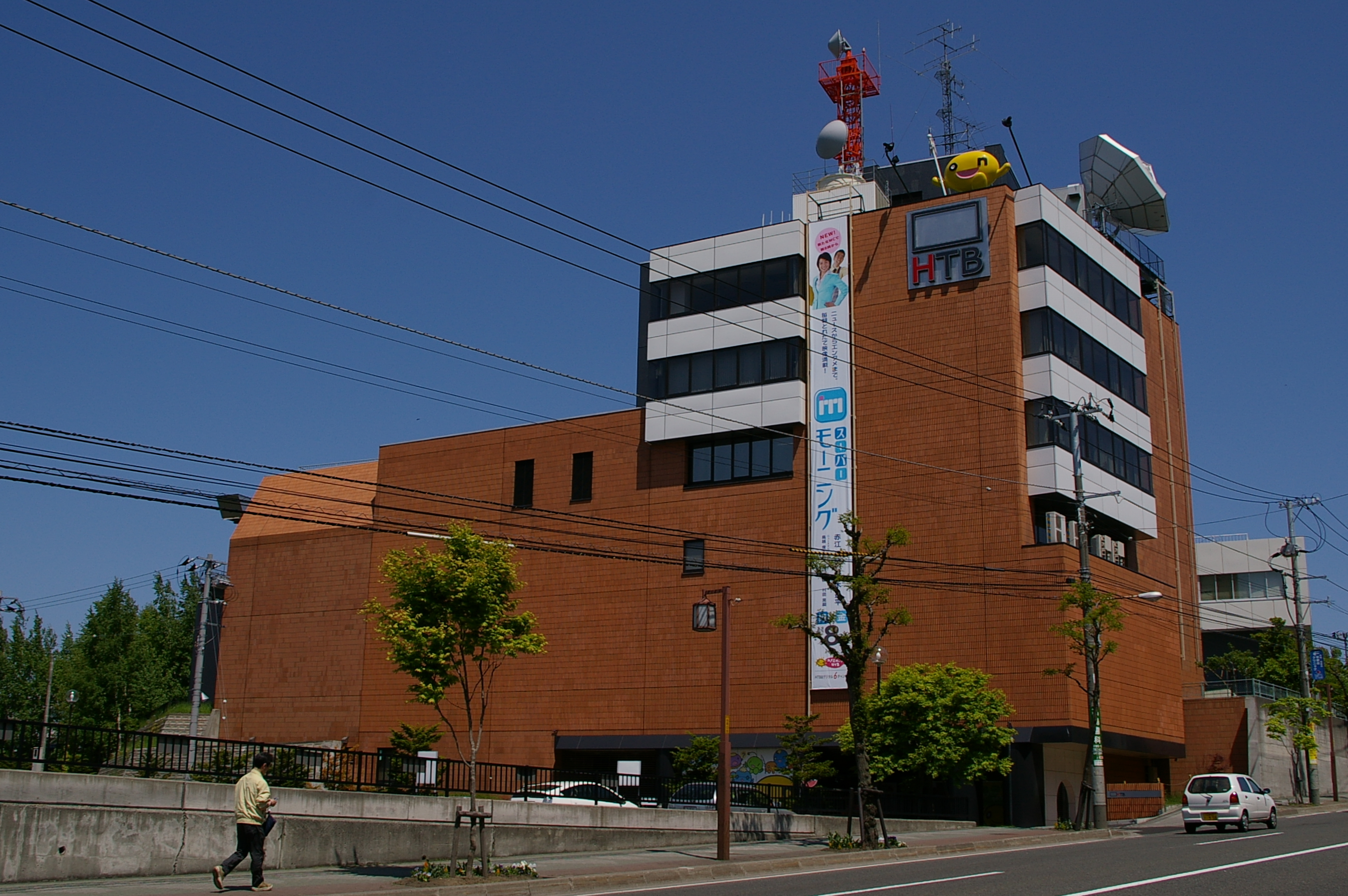
The first "on-chan object" on the roof of the first HTB headquarters building

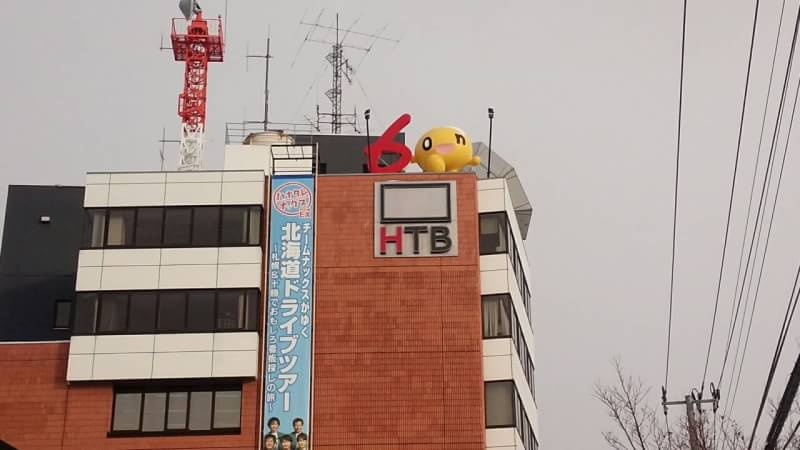
Second “on-chan object” on the roof of the first building at HTB headquarters

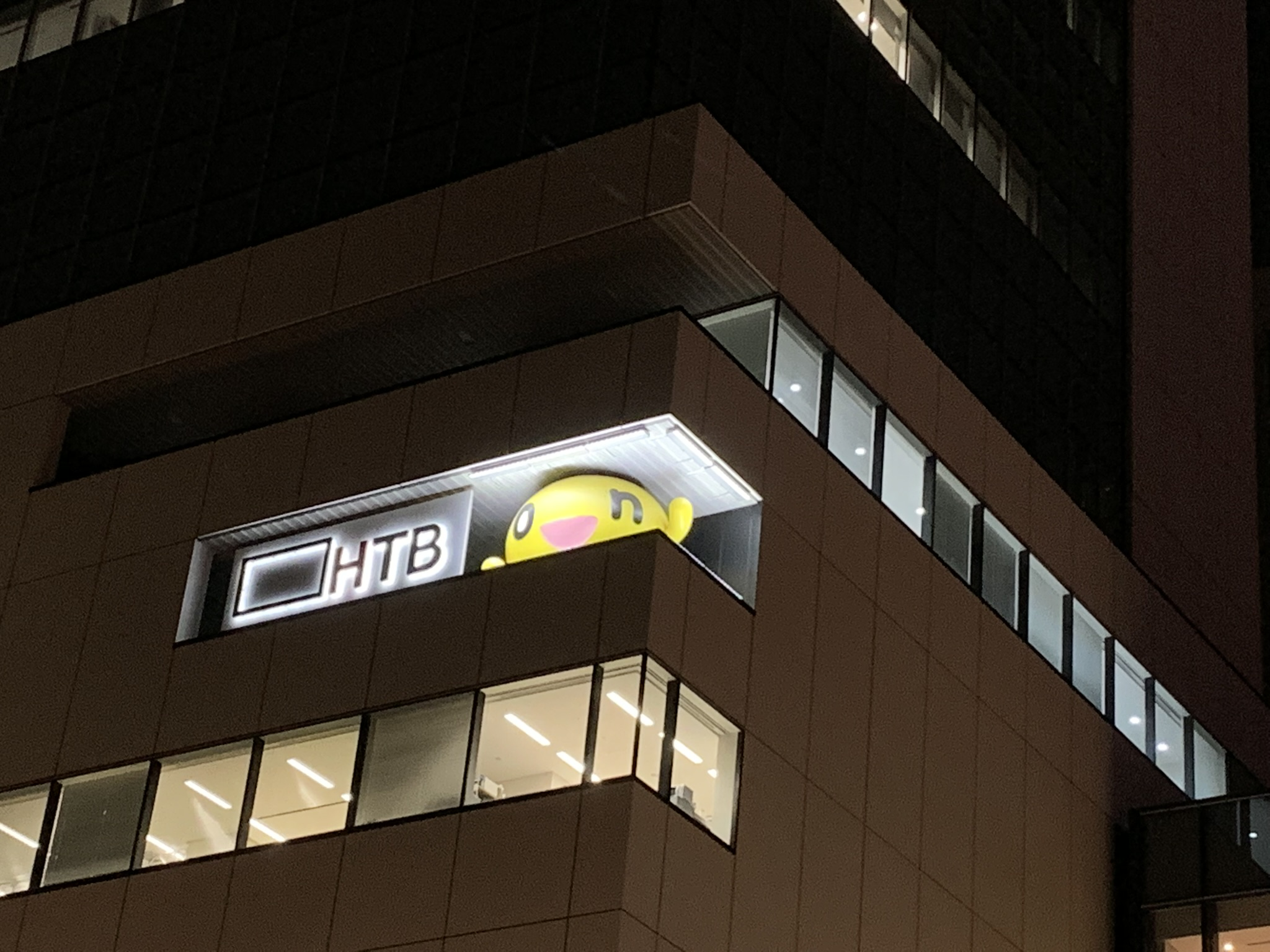
Third "on-chan object" at HTB headquarters/new building

The on-chan statue is located at the HTB head office building. The original statue, located at HTB's original building in Hiragishi, Toyohira Ward, Sapporo City, was erected on July 11, 1998. As part of the mascot's 10th anniversary of his debut, the statue was replaced by a newer version of the statue on November 24, 2007. The statue remained until June 25, 2021, where it was removed by crane as part of demolition works associated with the sale of the former head office's land to Tsuchiya Home Real Estate. The newer statue is located at HTB's headquarters at Sapporo Sosei Square in May 2018. It is located next to the HTB logo, and located from the building above the storage area. The composition gives the impression that the subject's face is exposed.

This "large on-chan" was sometimes given facelifts during important events involving HTB. During the Wednesday Tenmakudan Kanizu Jurota performance held as part of HTB's 35th anniversary project, "Large On-chan" wore a topknot for a limited time, and during Wednesday Dodo Festival UNITE 2005, a twisted headband was worn. It became a festival specification called a fan. When it was renewed in December 2007, an object with the number 6, the remote control key ID for digital terrestrial broadcasting, was also placed next to it.

Along with on-chan, an advertisement that read "Yumemiru, Chikara HTB Traffic Safety" was attached to a telephone pole beside the road leading from Minami Hiragishi Station to the first company building.

Since HTB's terrestrial digital broadcasting is 6 instead of 5 (compared to many ANN affiliates), the catchphrase "on-chan 6-chan HTB" is broadcast.

The site of the former company building has been renamed Peaceful Takadai Park on-chan HILLS, named after on-chan, as a residential subdivision, and in December 2022, a new Seicomart Hiragishi Takadai store will open on that corner. There is a stone statue monument of On-chan that marks the place where HTB opened.。

December 1, 2022 marked 25 years since its appearance. In line with this, HTB's catchphrase "Yumemiru, chikara" has been changed to "on-chan, action!", and the "manmaru on-chan" depicted in the animation and the so-called "kigurumi on-chan" have been created.

== Animations ==
- On-chan Anime Ippoi (onちゃんアニメいっぱい) - Produced a mini-anime of 20 commercial spots in 1999. On-chan's voice actor is Reiko Kifuji, who also played the role of On-chan in a promotional program produced at the same time with announcer Midori Yoshida (as of 1999). In addition, Hiroshi Oizumi will be the voice of Black No-chan, Tadahisa Fujimura, the director of Wednesday Dodo will be playing the role of the doctor, and Masamichi Ureshino, also a director, will be the voice of the assistant. SE was borrowed from fellow game company Hudson's Super Famicom game Samekame.
- On-chan's Dream Power Adventure! (Onちゃん夢パワー大冒険!) - A full-length made-for-TV anime feature film produced in 2003 that was also broadcast on some affiliated stations (HTB, NBN, KKB). On-chan's voice actor is Tomoe Shinohara. The movie was made to coincide with HTB's 35th anniversary. In 2004, a DVD containing the same anime, commercial spots, and footage from the HTB program appearance was released (described later).
- Yumemiru, Anime on-chan (ユメミル、アニメ「onちゃん」) - Television animated series of 26 episodes of five minutes each.

== 2004 On-chan DVD ==
Released on November 24, 2004. The following contents were included:

- On-chan's Dream Power Adventure! feature film - The anime is the main content of this DVD, in addition to that, it also includes recordings of Takayuki Suzui and Hiroshi Oizumi, and a promotional commercial featuring Kobukuro singing the theme song.
- On-chan Anime Ippoi - A mini-anime in which Reiko Kito acts as the voice of on-chan.
- On-chan Ondo - A dance created as part of the project for "Ibara no Mori".
- On-chan and friends - Introduction of the 16 characters.
- On-chan in action - On-chan's appearance scene in How do You Like Wednesday? and "Hanatarenax".
- Good morning on-chan/good night on-chan - Sign-on and sign-off videos used from 1999 to 2003 and from 2003 to 2006 (current at the time of release)

== Characters ==
- On-chan (onちゃん): the main character (described above).
- OK-chan (okちゃん): On-chan's childhood friend and girlfriend, who is bright and fashionable and takes the role of On-chan's older sister. Her hobbies include shopping and fortune telling, and her favorite foods are strawberries and cake.
- Guchi (ぐち): On-chan's longtime pet, who can also change size.
- No-chan (noちゃん): On-chan's rival. When he was young, he started being mean to On-chan because he couldn't find him while playing hide-and-seek. He is seen as the exact opposite of On-chan.
- Kyatagon (キャタゴン): No-chan's pet who can only move in straight lines.
- Me-chan (meちゃん): A fashion-conscious girl who has close relations with OK-chan and Tenko-chan. She likes gossip and talking all day long.
- Tenko-chan (てんこちゃん): She eats all day and recognizes her favorite foods just by smelling.
- Tomaru-kun (トマルくん): He has the tendency of being scared often and freezes when surprised. He can play the piano with his five legs.
- Nazona Moshi (なぞなモシー): An impatient character who wants to know everything and asks questions continuously.
- Doctor (博士): The inventor.
- Assistant (助手): The Doctor's assistant who respects him.
- Ou-chan (ouちゃん): No-chan's friend.
- An-chan (anちゃん): Oh-chan's older brother. His interests include enka music and old-fashioned items.
- Oh-chan (ohちゃん): An-chan's younger brother. He is a bit of a crybaby but also dreams of becoming an astronaut. He shares interest in enka music from his older brother.
- On Papa (onパパ): On-chan's father. He is a diplomat of the Parade Planet.
- On Mama (onママ): On-chan's mother. Her hobby is gardening and she also loves cooking.
- OK Papa (okパパ): OK-chan's father. His hobby is a diary tracking his daughter's growth.
- OK Mama (okママ): OK-chan's mother. She is a pastry chef.
