= Takako Katō (actress) =

Japanese actress and singer (born 1970)

Takako Katou
- Born: 14 October 1970 (age 55); Shizuoka, Shizuoka, Japan
- Occupation: Actress
- Years active: 1990–present
- Agent: Amuse, Inc.
- Known for: Hana Yori Dango Final

Takako Katou (加藤 貴子, Katō Takako; born 14 October 1970) is a Japanese TV actress, former J-pop singer, and the oldest member of the groups Lip's and Nanatsuboshi. She was born in Shimizu-ku, Shizuoka, and debuted on 21 March 1990.

== Filmography ==
=== Film ===
- My Secret Cache (1997)
- Hana Yori Dango Final (2008)
- Boku no Obāchan (2008)
- Rakugo Eiga (2013)
- Go Away, Moebius!! (2023)

=== Television ===
- Tonbi (2013)
