= Sapporo Television Broadcasting =

The Sapporo Television Broadcasting Co., Ltd.
- Logo used since 2013

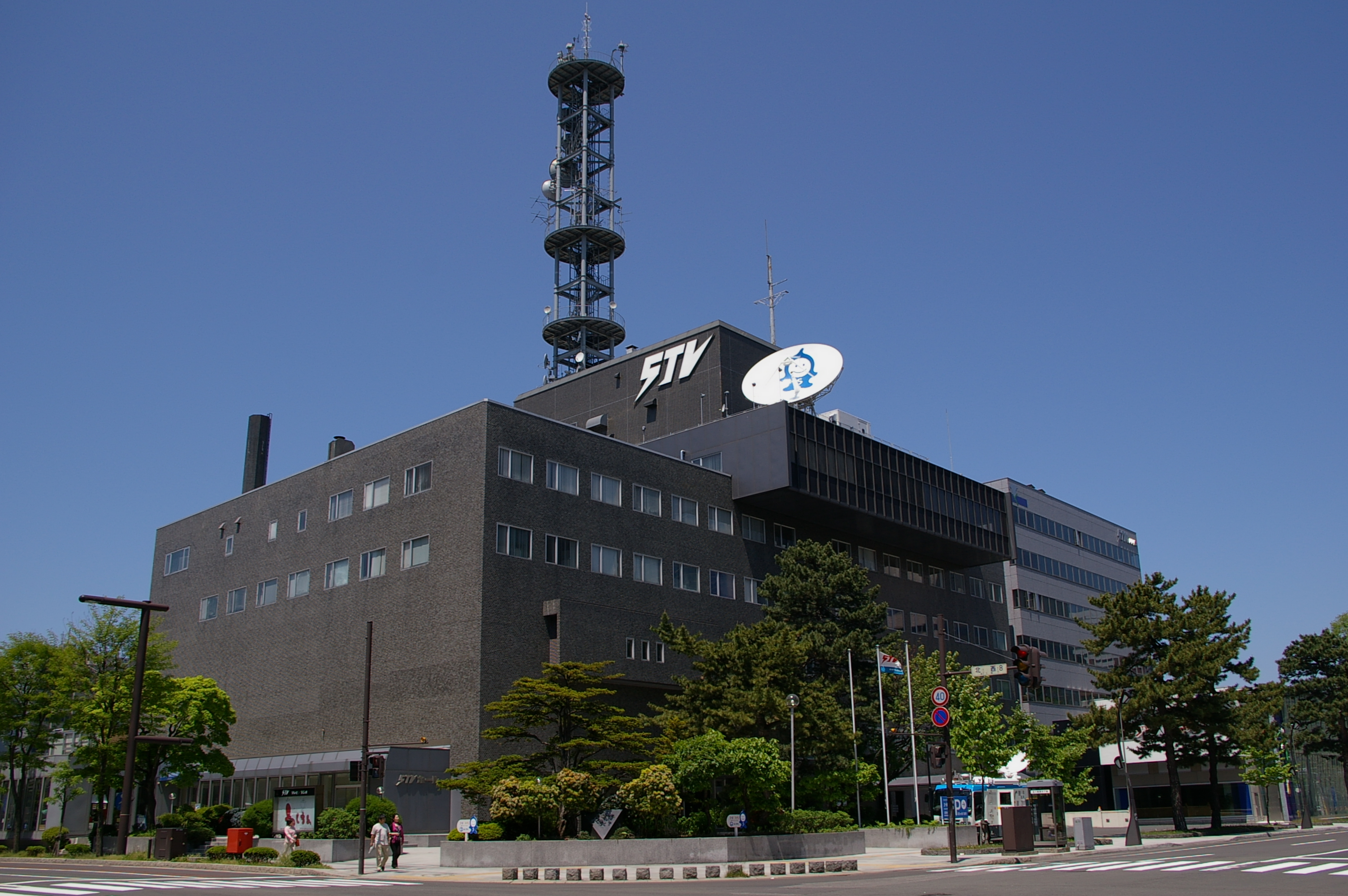
- Headquarters in Chūō-ku, Sapporo
- Native name: 札幌テレビ放送株式会社
- Romanized name: Sapporo Terebi Hōsō kabushiki gaisha
- Type: Subsidiary KK
- Industry: Media
- Founded: 8 April 1958; 68 years ago
- Headquarters: 8-1-1, North-1-West, Chūō-ku, Sapporo, Ishikari Subprefecture, Hokkaido Prefecture, Japan
- Area served: Hokkaido Prefecture, Japan
- Key people: Shoji Koyama (President)
- Services: Telecasting; Planning; Production and sales of TV programs
- Owner: Yomiuri Chukyo FS Broadcasting Holdings
- Subsidiaries: STVradio; Saporro Video production STV Development; STV Development Center
- Website: www.stv.jp

JOKX-DTV JOMY-TV (defunct)
- Hokkaido; Japan
- City: Sapporo
- Channels: Digital: 21 (UHF); Virtual: 5
- Branding: Sapporo Television; STV

Programming
- Language: Japanese
- Affiliations: Nippon News Network and Nippon Television Network System

Ownership
- Owner: The Sapporo Television Broadcasting Co., Ltd.

History
- First air date: April 1, 1959
- Last air date: July 24, 2011 (JOMY-TV)
- Former call signs: JOKX-TV (1959-2011)
- Former channel numbers: Analog: 5 (VHF, 1959-2011)
- Former affiliations: Fuji TV/FNN/FNS (secondary; April 1, 1959 – March 31, 1972)

Technical information
- Licensing authority: MIC
- ERP: 27 kW

JOWF
- Sapporo; Japan
- Broadcast area: Hokkaido Prefecture
- Frequencies: 1440 kHz (AM); 90.4 MHz (FM)
- Branding: STVradio

Programming
- Language: Japanese
- Format: Talk, Sports
- Affiliations: National Radio Network

Ownership
- Owner: The STVradio Broadcasting Co., Ltd.

History
- First air date: December 15, 1962

Technical information
- Licensing authority: MIC
- Power: 50,000 watts

Links
- Website: https://www.stv.jp/radio/index.html

Sapporo Television Broadcasting Co., Ltd. (札幌テレビ放送株式会社, Sapporo Terebi Hōsō Kabushiki Gaisha) is a TV station of Nippon News Network (NNN) and Nippon Television Network System (NNS) in Hokkaidō, Japan. Headquartered in Sapporo, the capital city of Hokkaidō prefecture, the TV station was established on April 8, 1958. It is usually called "STV" for short, which is used as a name in a number of TV programs.

Since December 15, 1962, the company has operated as a television and radio station until July 12, 2005, when its radio broadcasting operations was split into The STVradio Broadcasting, Co., Ltd. (STVラジオ株式会社, STV Rajio Kabushiki Gaisha). Currently, STV Radio is an affiliate of National Radio Network (NRN) covering the Hokkaidō Prefecture. The license of the radio broadcasts was succeeded to the STV Radio, and started broadcasting under the new subsidiary on October 1, 2005.

== History ==
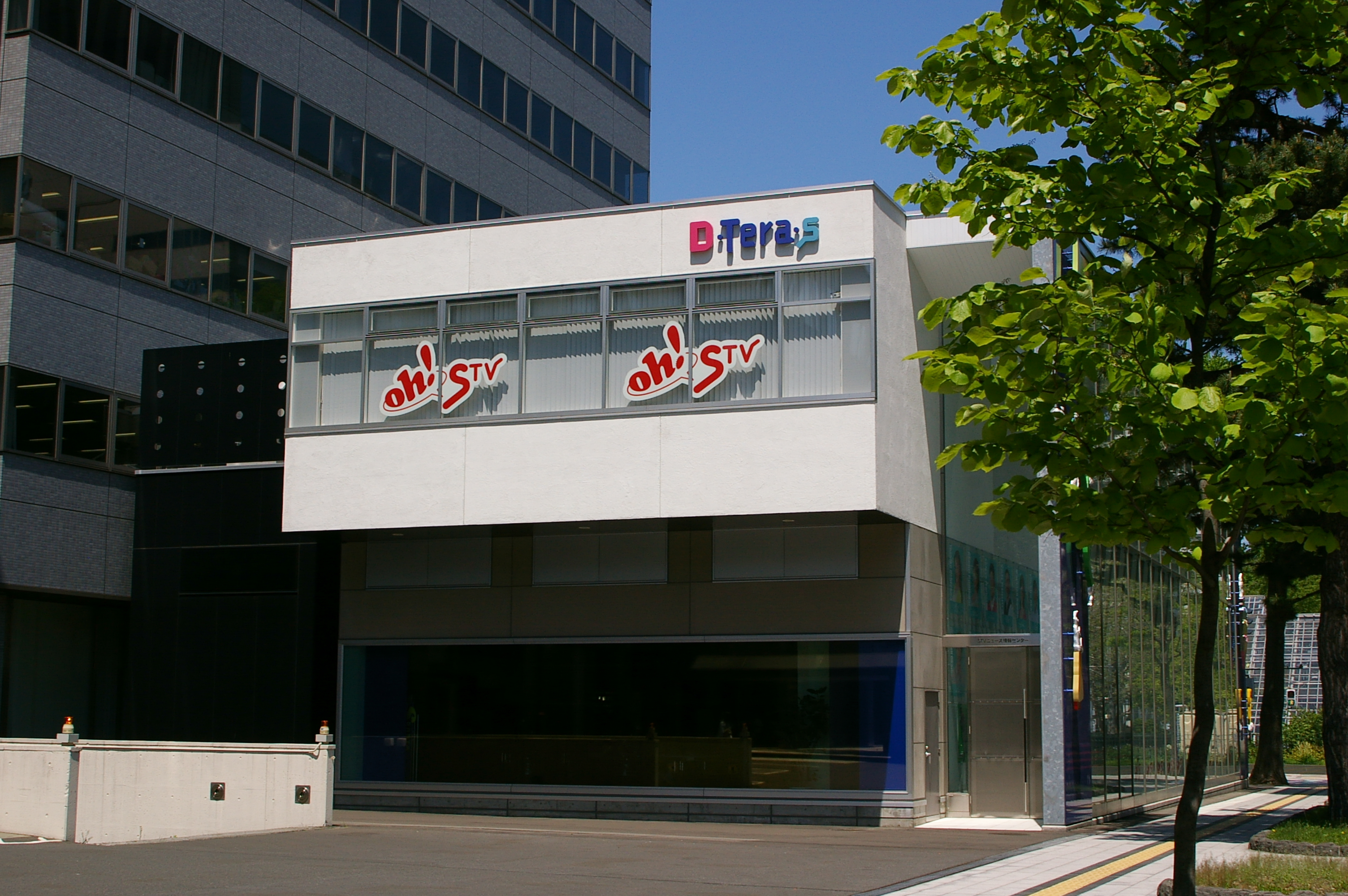
STV News Center "D・Tera・s"

=== Early stages ===
In early 1957, Youzo Kurosawa (then president of the Hokkai Shimbun), Yoshijiro Kikuchi (then president of the Hokkaido Charcoal Steamship Company), and Yoshitaro Hagiwara (president of the Hokkaido Charcoal Steamship Company), considered the formation of a second private television station in Hokkaido. Japan's national newspapers (Yomiuri Shimbun, Asahi Shimbun, Mainichi Shimbun, and Sankei Shimbun) attempted to enter the Hokkaido market at the time by combining two major sectors, television and newspapers, with the goal of creating a private television station.

This is unquestionably a serious danger to Hokkaido's existing newspaper, the Hokkai Shimbun. Hokkai Shimbun and an unnamed Hokkaido firm sought for a commercial TV broadcasting license under the name "Sapporo TV" in April 1957. And received their license on October of the same year.

=== Founding and early years ===
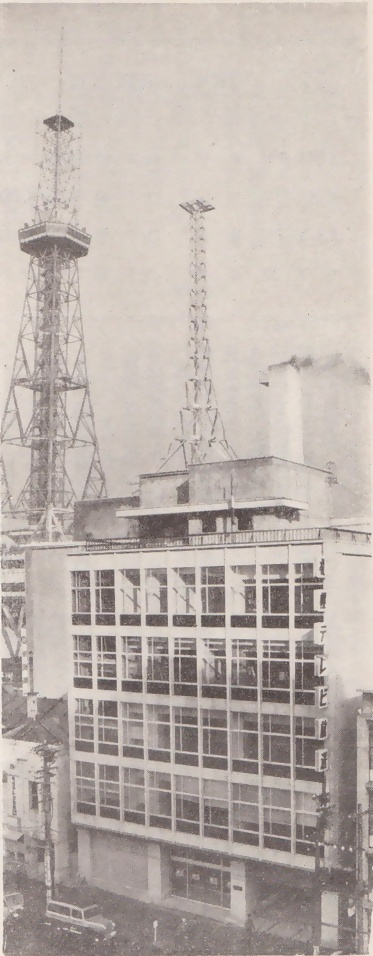
Sapporo TV's headquarters in 1961

The company was founded on April 8, 1958.STV began its TV broadcasts on April 1 the following year airing for at least 9 and a half hours a day. STV started as a dual affiliated station with NNN as their primary affiliate and FNN as their secondary affiliate. The network also aired certain programming from Nippon Educational Television (currently TV Asahi) alongside HBC. Since Sapporo TV initially obtained a quasi-educational station license, the station had to follow educational quotas for a substantial proportion of its programming. Sapporo TV's first self-produced program is also an educational program "Television Fudoki". In the first year of broadcasting, Sapporo TV's corporate income entered the top ten in Hokkaido. In 1960, the Sapporo TV Broadcasting Hall was completed, enabling Sapporo TV to have its own TV studio. In the same year, the Sapporo Television Union also announced its establishment. In 1961, STV's turnover reached 1.27 billion yen, and the average monthly turnover exceeded 100 million yen.

Prior to its official TV broadcasts, STV also applied a radio broadcasting license in 1958 (which was later rejected). The broadcaster applied for a license again on February 17, 1961 and was granted on July 10, 1962 becoming the only broadcaster in Japan to start TV broadcasts then radio broadcasts (STV Radio started broadcasting on December 15, 1962). NET TV stopped providing programs to STV after it moved its remaining programs to HBC sometime in 1962. Relying on the principle of thorough budget frugality, Sapporo TV set a very high profit rate of 42.5% in the second half of 1963. In 1964, the station's signal had covered 95% of the population of Hokkaido. On March 20, 1966, STV started to air programs in color. STV joined NNN as one of its founding members on April 1, 1966, to strengthen the news reporting system. When the TV broadcasting license was renewed in 1967, the broadcasting license of Sapporo TV Station was changed from a quasi-educational station to a general TV station, withdrawing the former quotas introduced upon launch. The programming was more free and more entertainment programs were broadcast. Sapporo TV's program production ability also improved in the late 1960s, and in 1969, it assisted in the production of the popular late-night program 11PM of the Nippon Television Network. In 1971, Sapporo TV Station built a new broadcasting hall, whose building area was three times that of the old broadcasting hall, and set up a special studio for TV news.

In 1972, Sapporo TV also assisted in broadcasting the Sapporo Winter Olympics. STV ended airing programs from Fuji TV/FNN after UHB started broadcasting on April 1, 1972. In 1977, Sapporo TV became the first broadcaster to use the automatic advertising broadcast system. In 1978, the 20th anniversary of the broadcast, Sapporo TV produced special programs such as the documentary "One Year", and held special events such as "European Famous Paintings Appreciation Conference". In 1980, the turnover of Sapporo TV's television department reached 8.34 billion yen, and the revenue of the radio department reached 1.736 billion yen. In 1984, the turnover of Sapporo TV's TV department exceeded 10 billion yen, and the radio department exceeded 2 billion yen. In 1985, the listening rate of STV radio surpassed that of Hokkaido Broadcasting for the first time, and won the first place in Hokkaido. In 1991, Sapporo TV's TV department had a turnover of 13.374 billion yen, and its radio department had a turnover of 3.21 billion yen, becoming the private broadcasting company with the highest turnover in Hokkaido for the first time. In 1993, to commemorate the 35th anniversary of the broadcast, Sapporo TV held the "Higashiyama Kaii" exhibition, which attracted 100,000 people to visit. In the same year, Sapporo TV's average audience rating for the whole day was 10.4%, the average audience rating for prime time was 16%, and the average audience rating for evening time was 15.3%. The first time to win the ratings triple crown in the Hokkaido area. In January 1996, Sapporo TV opened its official website. In 1998, the 40th anniversary of broadcasting, Sapporo TV opened a Berlin branch to strengthen the collection of overseas news. But in 2005, Sapporo TV closed the Berlin branch and opened the Moscow branch.

In 1993, STV ranked number 1 in TV ratings for the first time. In 1998, the 40th anniversary of the network, the network opened its NNN bureau in Berlin (later closed in 2005 and opened a news bureau in Moscow on the same year instead).

=== 2000s ===
On April 7, 2000, the Sapporo Media Park "Spica" invested by the network officially opened, becoming an important cultural base in Sapporo. However, due to continued losses, STV withdrew from operating Spica in 2007 (parts of the Spica building was later demolished by the following year). Since 2003, STV was number 1 in TV ratings. On July 13, 2005, STV separated its radio operations into a wholly owned subsidiary, STV Radio.

On June 1, 2006, STV started digital broadcasting (which expanded its digital relay stations in its sub-prefectures by the following year. However, due to the increase in investment in digital TV equipment, Sapporo TV suffered a loss for the first time since its broadcast in 2006. Analog broadcasting then ended on July 24, 2011. As of 2019, STV has been number 1 in TV ratings for 12 years, with its all-day ratings also number 1 for 27 years since 1993 continuing to set the longest record in Japan.

=== 2020s ===
On November 29, 2024, STV, alongside fellow NNN/NNS affiliates Yomiuri TV, Chukyo TV and Fukuoka Broadcasting System announced that it would combine and integrate its management operations to form a holding company known as Yomiuri Chukyo FS Broadcasting Holdings Corp. with its offices being located at NTVHD's headquarters in Minato, Tokyo. The merger, classified as a joint stock transfer closed on April 1, 2025 pending approval from the Ministry of Internal Affairs and Communications. Unlike a full restructuring of either STV, YTV, CTV and FBS, all four broadcasters would become wholly owned subsidiaries of the combined company with its operations, including its corporate functions remaining intact. The sale was approved by the shareholders of all four broadcasters, including STV on December 24th of that year.

== Technical Information ==
Sub-prefecture	TV		Radio	
Sub-prefecture	Analog	Digital	AM	FM
Sapporo (Note: Includes the Ishikari Subprefecture, Shiribeshi Subprefecture, central and southern Sorachi Subprefecture)	JOKX-TV; 5ch	JOKX-DTV; 5ch	JOWF; 1440kHz	90.4MHz
Muroran (Note: Includes the Iburi Subprefecture and Hidaka Subprefecture)	JOLY-TV; 7ch	JOKX-DTV; 5ch	JOWF; 1440kHz	
Hakodate (Note: Includes the Oshima Subprefecture and Hiyama Subprefecture)	JOMY-TV; 12ch	JOKX-DTV; 5ch	JOWF; 1440kHz	
Asahikawa (Note: Includes the Kamikawa Subprefecture, northern Sorachi Subprefecture, Rumoi Subprefecture and Sōya Subprefecture)	JOKY-TV; 7ch	JOKX-DTV; 5ch	JOWL; 1197kHz	
Obihiro (Note: Includes the Tokachi Subprefecture)	JOWL-TV; 10ch	JOKX-DTV; 5ch	JOWM; 1071kHz	
Kushiro (Note: Includes the Kushiro Subprefecture and Nemuro Subprefecture)	JOSY-TV; 7ch	JOKX-DTV; 5ch	JOWS; 882kHz; JOXS; 1062kHz (Nemuro)	
Kitami - Abashiri (Note: Includes the Abashiri Subprefecture)	JOYS-TV; 7ch	JOKX-DTV; 5ch	JOYS; 1485kHz	

== Programs ==
=== STV ===
- Dosanko Wide
- Dosanko Sunday
- Bakushou Mondai no SUSUME
- ippachi ikouyo!

=== STV Radio ===
- OHAYO!! HOKKAIDO
- Attack Young(end)
- AtaYoun PUSH!
- Weekend Variety Goro-Hidaka Show (every Saturday)
- All Night Nippon (from Nippon Broadcasting System, Incorporated (LF))
  - All Night Nippon (Mon. - Sat. 25:00 - 27:00)
  - All Night Nippon Ever Green (Mon. - Thu. 27:00 - 29:00)
  - All Night Nippon R (Fri. 27:00 - 29:00, Sat. 27:00 - 28:30)
  - All Night Nippon Record (Sat. 28:30 - 29:00, not including LF)

== Rival TV stations in Hokkaido ==
- Hokkaido Cultural Broadcasting (uhb, 北海道文化放送, affiliated with CX and FNN / FNS) - 8
- Television Hokkaido (TVh, テレビ北海道, affiliated with TX Network) - 7
- Hokkaido Broadcasting Co., Ltd. (HBC, 北海道放送, affiliated with TBS TV and JNN) - 1
- Hokkaido Television Broadcasting (HTB, 北海道テレビ放送, affiliated with TV Asahi and ANN) - 6
