= Shigeyuki Totsugi =

Japanese actor and seiyū (born 1973)

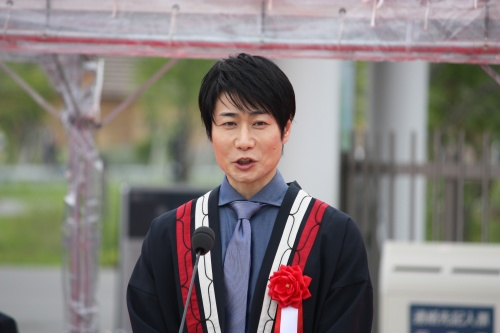
- Born: Shigeyuki Sato; November 7, 1973 (age 52); Teine-ku, Sapporo, Hokkaido, Japan
- Other name: Shigeyuki Sato (Until 2007)
- Occupation: Actor
- Years active: 1993–present
- Agents: Creative Office Cue; Amuse Inc. (Business Partnership)
- Spouse: Yui Ichikawa (m. 2015)

Shigeyuki Totsugi (戸次 重幸, Totsugi Shigeyuki; born November 7, 1973) is a Japanese actor, TV personality, voice actor, screenwriter, theatre director, and singer. His real name and former stage name is Shigeyuki Sato (佐藤 重幸, Sato Shigeyuki). He was born in Teine-ku, Sapporo, Hokkaido. He is a member of the TEAM NACS. He graduated from Hokkaido Sapporo Teine High School and, Hokkai Gakuen University. His wife is actress Yui Ichikawa.

== Biography ==
Born and raised in the current Teine-ku, Sapporo. When he was a collage ronin (a student who failed to enter the university and is studying to pass the entrance exam again), he was fascinated by a solo performance by Issey Ogatabroadcast on TV, and decided to stop taking the entrance exam and become an actor. He declared this intention to his parents on the same day, but his parents strongly persuaded him in tears, so he ended up attending the college. Entered a theater study group in Hokkai Gakuen University and started stage activities.

At the theater study group, he met Hiroyuki Morisaki, Ken Yasuda, Yo Oizumi, and Takuma Otoo, and formed TEAM NACS as a one-time unit in 1996. He was thinking to go to Tokyo to continue acting, but TEAM NACS was reunited in 1997 and got momentum in Hokkaido. Impressed by Morisaki's desire to make TEAM NACS a local theatrical unit in Hokkaido that would receive many stage offers from Tokyo, he has been active as a member of TEAM NACS while working as a local talent in Hokkaido.

Joined CREATIVE OFFICE CUE in 2000 with Oto'o by transferring from the office he belonged to at that time. First advance to Tokyo at the TEAM NACS stage performance held in May 2004. In 2005, she made her first appearance in a nationwide online drama series "1 Liter of Tears". Since then, he has been active mainly in Tokyo, such as appearing in serial dramas and movies produced by the Tokyo flagship station.

His mother died of cancer in December 2006. From January 1, 2008, the stage name was changed from the real name "Shigeyuki Sato" to "Shigeyuki Totsugi" after taking the mother's maiden name. The mother's maiden name "Totsugi" is originally read as "Bekki", but it is read as "Totsugi" which is easy to read and remember.

Married to actress Yui Ichikawa on September 8, 2015, after co-starring in the 2014 drama "Owakon TV" (NHK BS Premium). On September 26, 2016, the first boy was born. On September 10, 2020, a second boy was born.

== Filmography ==
=== TV dramas ===
| Year | Title | Role | Notes | Ref. |
|---|---|---|---|---|
| 2019 | Natsuzora: Natsu's Sky | Seiji Yamada | Asadora | |
| 2024 | Swallows | Hidaka | | |
| 2025 | Captured Broadcasting Station | Daichi Amami | | |
| 2026 | "Kochira yobi jieieiyūho?!" | Mizuno | | |

=== Movie ===
| Year | Title | Role | Notes | Ref. |
|---|---|---|---|---|
| 2013 | Rakugo Eiga | A movie director | Anthology film | |
| 2015 | Hokori to Genso | | Lead role | |
| 2017 | One Week Friends | | | |
| 2017 | Yurari | | | |
| 2017 | Ekisutorand | | | |
| 2018 | Kam ito Hito no Aida | Soeda | Lead role | |
| 2018 | After the Rain | Chihiro Kujo | | |
| 2021 | Good Luck! Team Nacs: Movie Version | Himself | | |
| 2025 | Thus Spoke Rohan Kishibe: At a Confessional | Sotoba | | |

== Discography ==
- Not get up guy (起きないあいつ, Duet song with Yo Oizumi in 2004)

== Bibliography ==
- ONE (2014)
