= Ken Yasuda (actor) =

Japanese actor (born 1973)

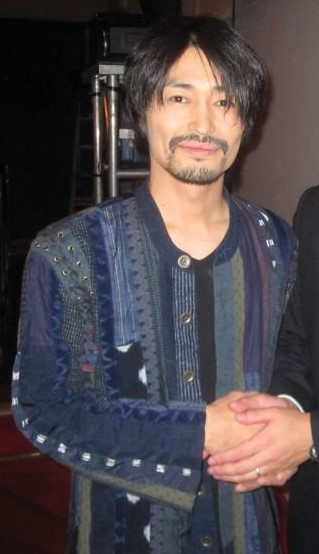
- Born: 8 December 1973 (age 52); Muroran, Hokkaido, Japan
- Occupation: Actor
- Years active: 1993–present
- Agents: Creative Office Cue; Amuse Inc. (Business Partnership)

Ken Yasuda (安田 顕, Yasuda Ken; born December 8, 1973) is a Japanese actor, television personality and seiyu. Born in Muroran, Hokkaido, he is a member of Team Nacs. He is a graduate of Hokkaido Muroran Sakae High School and Hokkai Gakuen University. Fumio Yasuda is his older brother.

== Biography ==
At Hokkai Gakuen University, Yasuda joined the theater club and the theatrical company OOPARTS (led by its president Takayuki Suzui). In 1996, following graduation, Yasuda and theater club friends Hiroyuki Morisaki, Shigeyuki Totsugi, Yo Oizumi, and Takuma Otoo created TEAM NACS. The team was disbanded after their first performance.

After graduating from university, Yasuda began working as a medical office worker. He stopped after 10 months because he wanted to concentrate on activities in the performing arts. After leaving the medical office, he worked part-time in Hokkaido, taking on jobs such as helping at a hotel breakfast buffet. Even during his part-time work, he continued to focus on his career in entertainment.

In 1997, Morisaki reunited TEAM NACS and Yasuda joined the group once more. Since 1998, he has appeared semi-regularly as a suit actor for the mascot character "on-chan" in "How Do You Like Wednesday?".

TEAM NACS held its first stage performance in May 2004, in Tokyo. In 2006, Yasuda made his first appearance in the national online drama series "Jirocho Seoi Fuji" (NHK). Since then, he has also appeared in serial dramas and movies of the Tokyo flagship station, and has also held starring roles in TV series.

== Filmography ==
=== Television ===
Year	Title	Role	Notes	Ref.
2006	Kōmyō ga Tsuji	Ukita Hideie	Taiga drama	
2008	Hitomi	Yuzo Ishida	Asadora	
2022	Love with a Case	Masumi Morizono		
2023	Sexy Tanaka-san	Kō		
2024	Ōoku: The Palace	Tanuma Okitsugu		
2025	Unbound	Hiraga Gennai	Taiga drama	
2026	Soul Mate	Kenichi Hayakawa		

=== Film ===
Year	Title	Role	Notes	Ref.
2013	Rakugo Eiga	Grim Reaper	Anthology film	
2017	Gintama	Tetsuya Murata		
2017	DC Superheroes vs. Eagle Talon	Joker (voice)		
2018	Come On Irene	Iwao Shishido	Lead role	
2018	When I Get Home, My Wife Always Pretends to Be Dead	Jun Kagami	Lead role	
2019	The Fable	Ebihara		
2019	When My Mom Died, I Wanted to Eat Her Ashes	Satoshi Miyagawa	Lead role	
2019	Dragon Quest: Your Story	Pusan (voice)		
2020	Beneath the Shadow	Kaoru		
2020	Hotel Royal	Daikichi Tanaka		
2021	Good Luck! Team Nacs: Movie Version	Himself	Lead role	
2021	The Fable: The Killer Who Doesn't Kill	Ebihara		
2022	Ring Wandering	Seiichi	Special appearance	
2022	Tombi: Father and Son	Shōun		
2022	Fragments of the Last Will	Hara		
2023	In Love and Deep Water	Michihiko Kuruma		
2023	Shin Kamen Rider	Murderer		
2024	Sakura	Toshiyuki Togashi		
2024	The Voices at War	Tadamaro Mera		
2025	The 35-Year Promise	Megumi Taniyama		
2025	River Returns	Tsunekichi		
2025	Dollhouse	Yamamoto		
2025	Taste and Tears	Kohei Kazama		
2026	The Imaginary Dog and the Lying Cat			
2027	Sleeping in the Red Earth			

=== Japanese dub ===
Year	Title	Role	Notes	Ref.
2022	The Bad Guys	Snake		

=== Video games ===
Year	Title	Role	Notes	Ref.
2020	Yakuza: Like a Dragon	Yu Nanba		
2024	Like a Dragon: Infinite Wealth	Yu Nanba		

== Awards and nominations ==
Year	Award	Category	Work(s)	Result	Ref.
2025	67th Blue Ribbon Awards	Best Supporting Actor	Sakura and The Voices at War	Nominated	
