= Hokkai Gakuen University =

Private university in Sapporo, Hokkaido, Japan

Coordinates: 43.04577°N 141.368101°E

- 北海学園大学
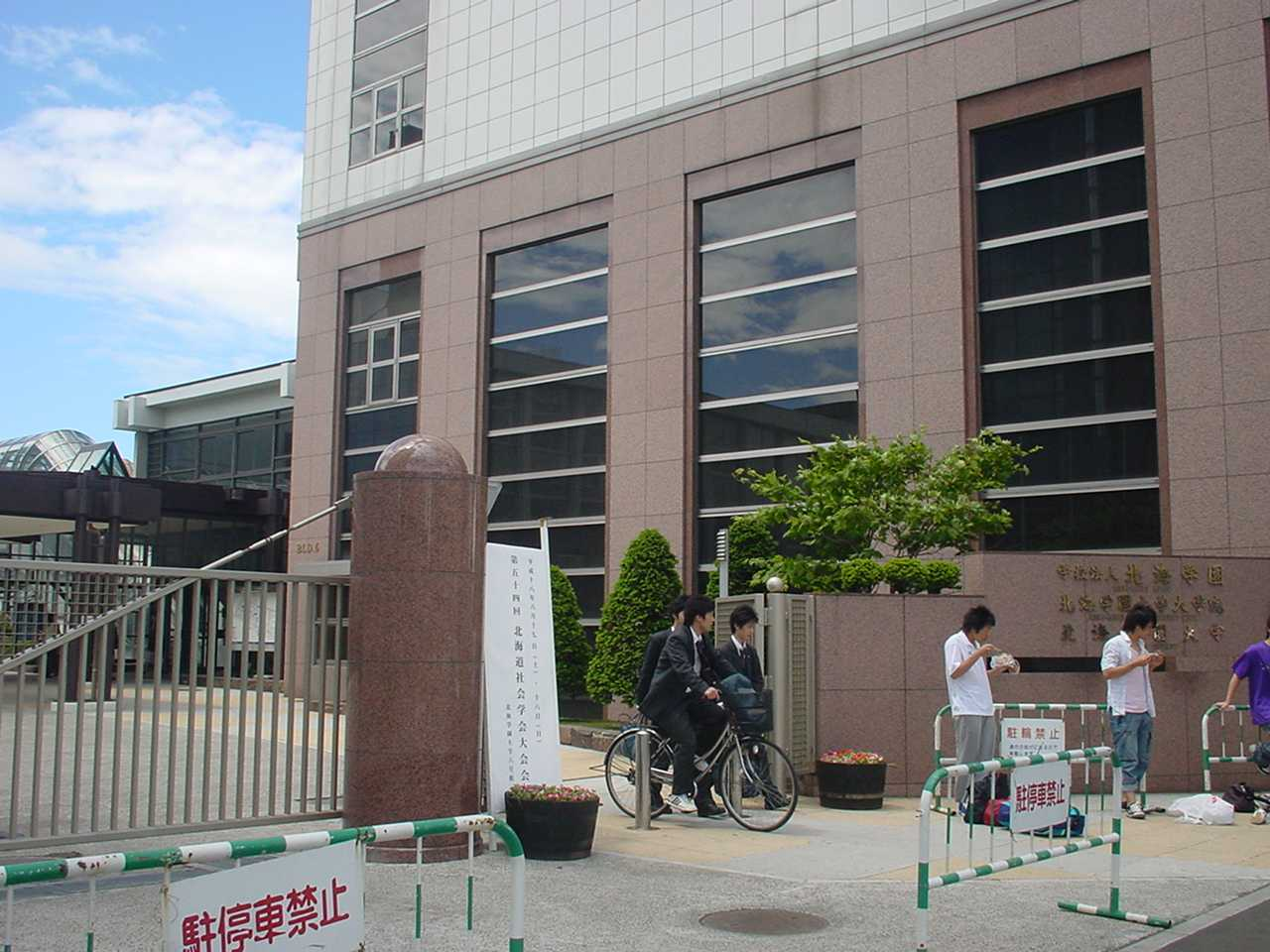
- Type: Private
- Established: 1885, chartered as a university in 1952
- Location: Sapporo, Hokkaidō, Japan
- Website: Official website

Hokkai Gakuen University (北海学園大学, Hokkai gakuen daigaku) is a private university in Sapporo, Hokkaidō, Japan. The precursor of the school was founded in 1885, and it was chartered as a university in 1952.

== Organization ==
=== Faculties ===
- Economics
- Business Administration
- Law
- Humanities
- Engineering

=== Graduate schools ===
- Economics
- Business Administration
- Law
- Literature
- Engineering

==== Professional graduate school ====
- Law School

== Alumni ==
- Koji Yamase - Footballer
- Yō Ōizumi - Actor
