= Hokkaido Television Broadcasting =

JOHH-DTV
- Logo used since 2006

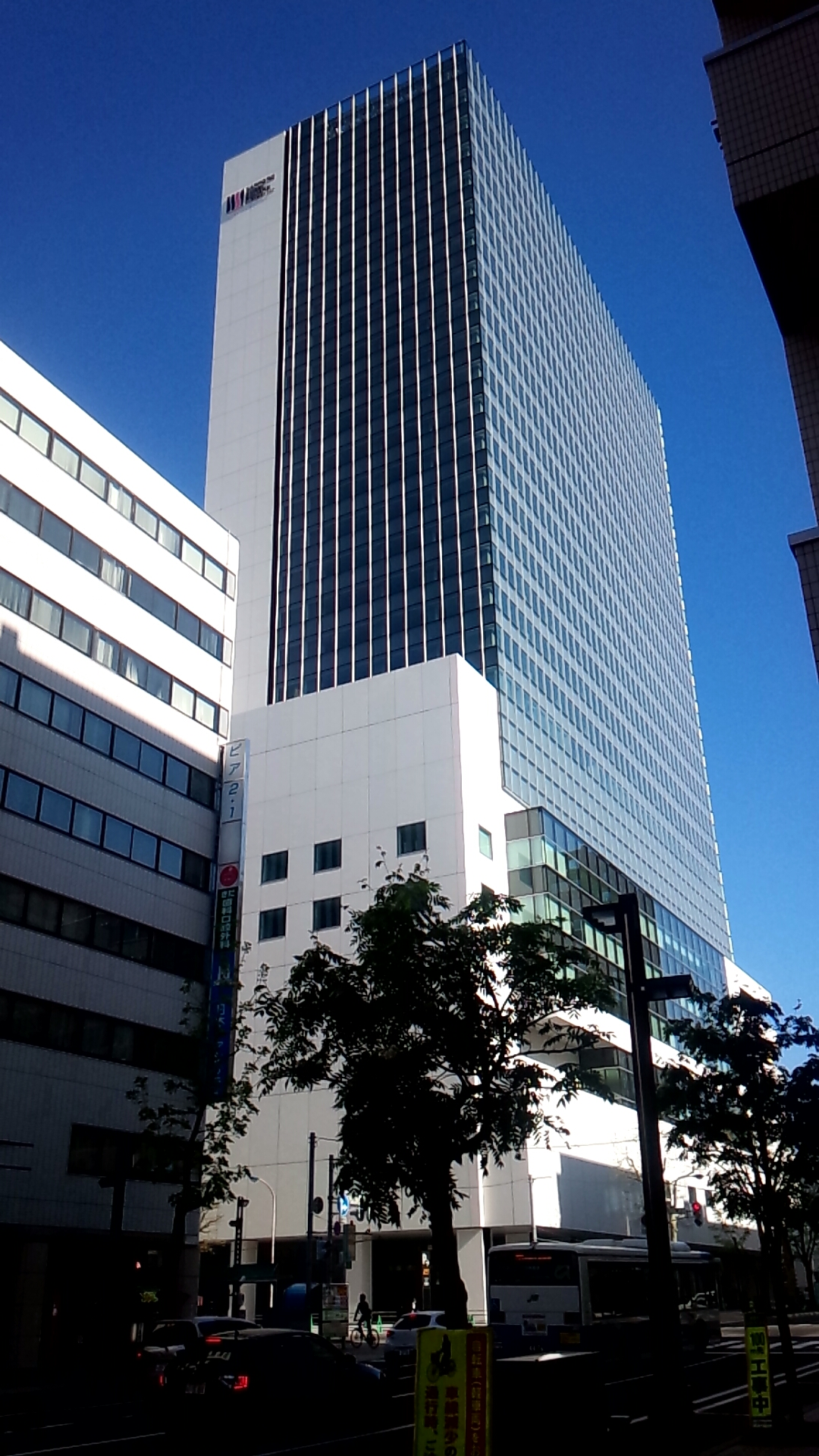
- Headquarters in Chūō-ku, Sapporo
- Hokkaido; Japan
- City: Sapporo
- Channels: Digital: 23 (UHF); Virtual: 6
- Branding: Hokkaido Television, HTB

Programming
- Language: Japanese
- Affiliations: All-Nippon News Network

Ownership
- Owner: Hokkaido Television Broadcasting Co., Ltd.

History
- First air date: November 3, 1968
- Former call signs: JOHH-TV (1968-2011)
- Former channel numbers: Analog: 35 (UHF, 1968-2011)
- Call sign meaning: Hokkaidō Terebi Hōsō (native name)

Technical information
- Licensing authority: MIC

Links
- Website: www.htb.co.jp

Corporate information
- Company
- Native name: 北海道テレビ放送株式会社
- Romanized name: Hokkaidōterebihōsō kabushikigaisha
- Type: Kabushiki gaisha
- Industry: Television broadcasting
- Founded: December 1, 1967; 58 years ago
- Headquarters: 1-6, Nishi, Kita 1-jo, Chūō-ku, Sapporo, Ishikari Subprefecture, Hokkaido, Japan
- Key people: Tatsuro Terauchi (President)
- Number of employees: 179
- Footnotes; Data from its Corporate Profile

Hokkaido Television Broadcasting Co., Ltd. (北海道テレビ放送株式会社, Hokkaidō Terebi Hōsō Kabushikigaisha; HTB) is a TV station in Sapporo, Hokkaidō, Japan. It is affiliated with the All-Nippon News Network (ANN)

== History ==
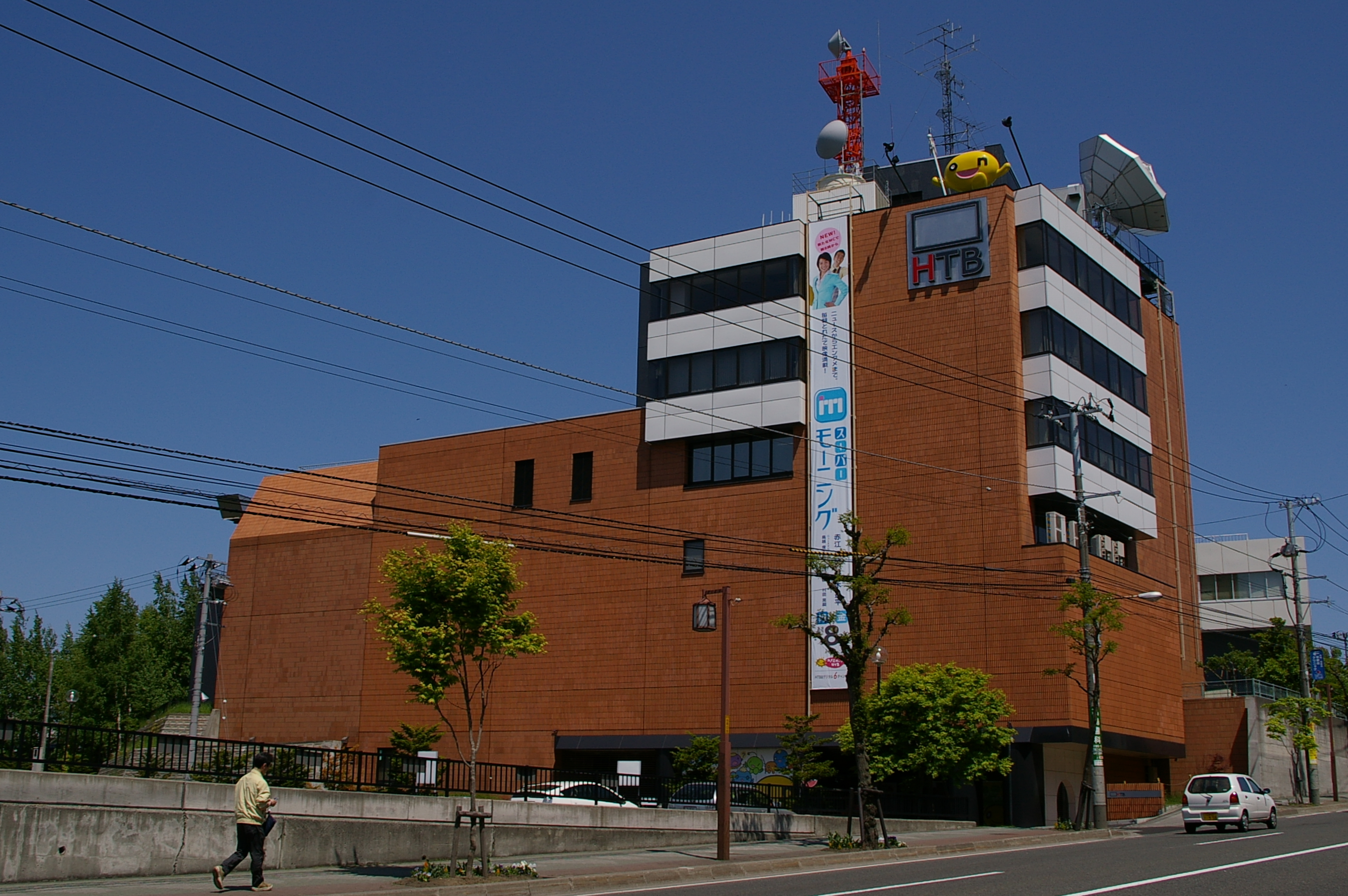
Former headquarters until September 17, 2018.

In the late 1960s, the Ministry of Posts and Telecommunications opened the UHF frequency band for television broadcasting, and the third commercial television station was awarded to Hokkaido. At that time, a total of seven operators applied for this broadcast license. Afterwards, "Dōmin Broadcasting" (道民放送), centered on Sapporo Toyopet President Yasushi Iwasawa and Iwata Construction President Yan Iwata, obtained a broadcast license and integrated with other applicants. On December 1, 1967, Hokkaido Television held an initiative People's Association. At that time, both Fuji Television and NET TV (now TV Asahi) were trying to get Hokkaido TV to join their own broadcast networks. Because NET showed strong support, Hokkaido TV decided to join the network of NET TV stations. On October 7 of the following year, Hokkaido Television received its official broadcasting license. This license is a quasi-educational station license, which stipulates that more than 30% of the programs broadcast by Hokkaido TV must be educational and cultural programs. On October 15, HTB launched its test broadcasts.

At 8:50 in the morning on November 3, 1968, Hokkaido Television officially launched, becoming the third commercial television station in Hokkaido. On May 26 of the following year, due to a failure in the coaxial tube transmitting signals, Hokkaido Television was forced to suspend broadcasting for 15 hours and 34 minutes. When ANN was established on January 1, 1970, Hokkaido Television was one of the nine founding members [7]. On October 3, 1973, the eve of the fifth anniversary of the broadcast, Hokkaido Television established a labor union. In May 1975, Hokkaido Television signed a sister station agreement with KATU-TV in Portland, Oregon, Sapporo's sister city. Since then, Hokkaido TV has sent employees to KATU-TV for training many times. After the 1980s, Hokkaido TV signed cooperation agreements with China's Heilongjiang TV and Shenzhen Radio, Film and Television Group, Seattle's KOMO-TV in the United States, Russia's Sakhalin TV, and South Korea's Gangwon No.1 Broadcasting and Taejon Broadcasting Corporation to further develop international cooperation. Hokkaido introduced ENG in 1977, becoming the first commercial TV station north of Tokyo to introduce ENG. As a result, its news program production capabilities have been greatly improved.

In March 1981, Yasushi Iwasawa, who was also the president of Sapporo Toyopet and Hokkaido Television, went bankrupt due to stock speculation, and Sapporo Toyopet collapsed. The bankruptcy of the parent company caused Hokkaido TV Station to be affected by the chain and on the verge of bankruptcy. The Asahi Shimbun and TV Asahi invested in relief at this time, and since then Asahi enterprises have taken the lead in the management of Hokkaido TV. On November 3, 1983, Hokkaido TV began to broadcast stereo programs. In 1988, the 20th anniversary of its founding, Hokkaido TV produced a series of special programs, including programs broadcast nationwide through the ANN network.

Hokkaido Television opened its official website on August 21, 1995, making it the first television station in Hokkaido to open an official website. On January 1, 2006, Hokkaido Television launched the current trademark. On June 1 of the same year, Hokkaido Television began broadcasting digital television signals. Hokkaido TV broadcast the Hokkaido Nippon Ham Fighters' Nippon Professional Baseball Championship game on October 26 of this year, achieving a ratings record of 52.5%, setting the highest ratings record for Hokkaido TV to date. On July 24, 2011, Hokkaido TV station stopped broadcasting analog TV signals.

Hokkaido Television has participated in the "Sapporo Genesis 1.1.1 District North 1 West 1 District First Type Urban Land Redevelopment Project" led by the City of Sapporo. The NHK Sapporo Broadcasting Station was originally interested in participating in this project, but later withdrew. Hokkaido Television replaced it and joined the urban renewal plan. After the completion of Sapporo Genesis Plaza on June 20, 2018, Hokkaido Television moved into Sapporo Genesis Plaza on September 17 of the same year and began broadcasting programs from the new headquarters. On the day of moving into the new headquarters, Hokkaido TV broadcast a special opening and closing short film. However, on September 6, the eve of moving into the new headquarters, Hokkaido TV station was unable to broadcast the program for 11 minutes and 20 seconds due to the 2018 Hokkaido earthquake. After Hokkaido TV moved into the new headquarters, the old headquarters located in Nanpingan, Toyohei District, Sapporo City will be sold and demolished in 2021. Apartments are expected to be built on the site of the old headquarters. Hokkaido Television has increased its investment in the Internet in recent years. Hokkaido Television opened its official YouTube channel in 2013, and in recent years it has begun broadcasting its own programs on the Internet in real time.

=== Analog shutdown controversy ===
On July 24, 2011, this station gained local attention when it played the song Time to Say Goodbye repeatedly after analog broadcasts ended at noon. The MIC usually blocks vocal music to be played on most stations' analog shutdown warnings.

== See also ==
- On-chan
