= AIBOU: The Movie =

- DVD cover
- Directed by: Seiji Izumi
- Written by: Masashi Todayama
- Produced by: Hitoshi Ito; Hideaki Endo; Motohiro Matsumoto; Megumi Ueda; Junichi Katsuki; Atsuo Nishihira
- Starring: Yutaka Mizutani; Yasufumi Terawaki
- Cinematography: Masahiro Aida
- Edited by: Shin'ya Tadano
- Music by: Yoshihiro Ike
- Production companies: TV Asahi; Toei Company; Trysome; Amuse Inc. Shogakukan; ABC; Nagoya TV
- Distributed by: Toei Company, Ltd.
- Release date: May 1, 2008 (Japan)
- Running time: 117 minutes
- Country: Japan
- Language: Japanese
- Box office: ¥4.44 billion

AIBOU: The Movie, (Note: Japanese: 相棒 -劇場版- 絶体絶命! 42.195km 東京ビッグシティマラソン, Hepburn: Aibō -Gekijō-ban- Zettai Zetsumei! 42.195km Tōkyō Biggu Shiti Marason; lit. "BUDDY -Movie Version- A Desperate Situation! The 42.195 km Tokyo Big City Marathon") also known as Partners: The Movie, is a 2008 Japanese film directed by Seiji Izumi and based on the television series AIBOU: Tokyo Detective Duo. It was the first in the Aibou (Partners) film series, followed by AIBOU: CSI Files (2009), AIBOU: The Movie II (2010), AIBOU: X-DAY (2013), AIBOU: The Movie III (2014) and AIBOU: The Movie IV (2017).

== Cast ==
- Yutaka Mizutani
- Yasufumi Terawaki
- Sawa Suzuki
- Saya Takagi
- Kazuhisa Kawahara
- Ryosuke Otani
- Takashi Yamanaka
- Atsushi Yamanishi
- Seiji Rokkaku as Mamoru Yonezawa
- Ryūji Katagiri
- Ryō Ono
- Satoshi Jinbo
- Ittoku Kishibe
- Yuika Motokariya
- Yoshino Kimura
- Akira Onodera
- Masahiko Nishimura
- Masahiko Tsugawa
- Toshiyuki Nishida

== Reception ==
Yasufumi Terawaki was nominated for Best Supporting Actor at the 32nd Japan Academy Prize.
