= Naoki Hanzawa =

- Written by: Jun Ikeido; Yatsu Hiroyuki
- Directed by: Fukuzawa Katsuo; Takayoshi Tanazawa
- Starring: Masato Sakai; Aya Ueto; Mitsuhiro Oikawa; Kenichi Takito; Kataoka Ainosuke; Kento Kaku; Takashi Ukaji; Onoe Matsuya; Ichikawa En'nosuke; Mitsuko Baisho; Akira Emoto; Kin'ya Kitaōji; Teruyuki Kagawa
- Theme music composer: Takayuki Hattori
- Composer: Takayuki Hattori
- Country of origin: Japan
- Original language: Japanese
- No. of seasons: 2
- No. of episodes: 20

Production
- Running time: 46–92 minutes

Original release
- Network: TBS
- Release: July 7, 2013 – September 27, 2020

Naoki Hanzawa (Japanese: 半沢直樹, Hepburn: Hanzawa Naoki) is a 2013 and 2020 Japanese television series by Japanese broadcaster TBS based on the Hanzawa Naoki series of novels by Jun Ikeido. It follows the story of Naoki Hanzawa, a banker working for the largest bank in Japan, Tokyo Chuo Bank. He faces numerous obstacles from upper management as he climbs his way up the ranks. The show explores the toxic workplace culture in Japan in term of scapegoating; bullying and unfair seniority within the company's hierarchy.

The show received consistently high ratings: the final episode of Season 1 reached 42.2% of viewers in the Kanto area, the highest figure for a drama in the Heisei Era. The show's popularity in viewer polls achieved the highest rating in three decades of Japanese television drama.

Following its success as the most-watched series in Japan, Hanzawa Naoki made was broadcast overseas in Taiwan and Hong Kong, as well as Jamaica and the Marshall Islands. It was also distributed by Japan Foundation in some Latin American countries such as Mexico and Paraguay, dubbed in Spanish. In Brazil, the series are dubbed in Portuguese and aired via Band TV starts 19 January 2024.

A second season was announced in 2019, scheduled for the spring of 2020. Due to the 2019–20 coronavirus pandemic, the series broadcast and filming was postponed. The second season premiered in Japan in July 2020 and consisted of 10 episodes.

== Cast ==
- Masato Sakai as Naoki Hanzawa, a charismatic banker who works for the Tokyo Central Bank. His quest to avenge his father's death caused by the bank.

His family

- Aya Ueto as Hana Hanzawa, the wife of Naoki Hanzawa.
- Keita Ninomiya as Takahiro Hanzawa, the son of Naoki Hanzawa.
- Shōfukutei Tsurube II as Shinnosuke Hanzawa, the father of Naoki Hanzawa.
- Lily as Michiko Hanzawa, the mother of Naoki Hanzawa.

Tokyo Central Bank

- Mitsuhiro Oikawa as Shinobu Tomari, a close friend of Naoki who he met during the induction of the bank.
- Kenichi Takito as Naosuke Kondo', a former employee of Tokyo Central Bank and close friend of Naoki and Tomari.
- Teruyuki Kagawa as Akira Ohwada, the director of Tokyo Central Bank and the central antagonist of the series.
- Kin'ya Kitaōji (special appearance) as Ken Nakanowatari, the chairman of Tokyo Central Bank.
- Jundai Yamada as Keijirō Fukuyama
- Junpei Morita as Shingo Kishikawa
- Arata Furuta as Yōichirō Mikasa
- Yasunori Danta as Heihachi Kimoto
- Ichikawa Ennosuke IV as Taiji Isayama
- Kōtarō Yoshida as Hiroshi Naitō
- Norihiko Tsukuda as Yūya Sonezaki
- Kazuyuki Asano as Yoshinori Tomioka
- Jingi Irie as Shun Tajima

Osaka Nishi branch

- Kanji Ishimaru as Tadasu Asano, the sly and self-centered branch manager at the Osaka Nishi branch and the one who responsible for scapegoating Hanzawa. He is the primary antagonist of the Osaka arc.
- Ichirōta Miyagawa as Hiroshi Ejima
- Yuto Nakajima as Eiji Nakanishi

Kyōbashi branch

- Kazuhisa Kawahara as Ikuo Kaise
- Tōru Tezuka as Norio Kozato

Tokyo Central Securities

- Kento Kaku as Masahiro Moriyama
- Mio Imada as Hitomi Hamamura
- Tōru Masuoka as Mitsuhide Oka
- Narushi Ikeda as Shōichi Morota
- Akihiro Kakuta (Tokyo 03) as Shigeyuki Miki

Tamiya Denki Inc.

- Yasuyuki Maekawa as Motoki Tamiya
- Gō Rijū as Hideyuki Noda

Iseshima Hotel

- Taro Suruga as Takeshi Yuasa
- Mitsuko Baisho as Natsuko Hane
- Takashi Kobayashi as Shigenori Togoshi

National Tax Agency and Financial Services Agency

- Kataoka Ainosuke as Shunichi Kurosaki, the inspector of National Tax Agency
- Terunosuke Takezai as Ryōta Shimada
- Hideo Ishiguro as Sagami
- Mamoru Miyano as Furaya

Spiral Inc.

- Onoe Matsuya II as Yōsuke Sena
- Ryo Yoshizawa as Kei Kōsaka

Dennō Zatsugi Shūdan Inc.

- Hideo Tsuchida as Kazumasa Hirayama
- Yoko Minamino as Miyuki Hirayama

The Government

- Akira Emoto as Keiji Minobe
- Noriko Eguchi as Akiko Shirai, the Minister of Land, Infrastructure, Transport and Tourism
- Kazuya Kojima as Shigeki Kasamatsu

Teikoku Airways

- Katsumi Kiba as Iwao Kamiya
- Ken Ishiguro as Noboru Yamahisa
- Atsushi Yamanishi as Hiroshi Nagata
- Sōma Suzuki as Hideo Kitaki

Teikoku Airways reconstruction task force

- Michitaka Tsutsui as Shōta Nohara

Development and Investment Bank of Japan

- Naomi Nishida as Sachiyo Tanigawa

Others

- Miku Natsume as Herself
- Takashi Ukaji as Mitsuru Higashida
- Mitsu Dan as Miki Fujisawa
- Hidekazu Akai as Kiyohiko Takeshita
- Takumi Kitamura as Ryōsuke Kuroki
- Ian Moore as John Howard
- Haruka Igawa as Tomomi Niiyama
- Hiroko Nakajima as Rie Asano
- Shigeyuki Totsugi as Yukinari Gouda

== Plot ==
=== Osaka arc ===
Naoki Hanzawa (Masato Sakai) joins the Sangyo Chuo Bank (one of the predecessors of Tokyo Chuo Bank before its merger with Tokyo Daiichi Bank) and becomes Chief of the Loans Division at the Osaka Nishi branch. In a flashback, it is revealed that his father, a factory owner, committed suicide after the bank refused to extend the loan. Hanzawa swears revenge against the Sangyo Chuo Bank bank by climbing through ranks and controls it.

When he proposes a loan for a struggling but promising screw manufacturer, he is forced by branch manager Asano (Kanji Ishimaru) to grant an unsecured loan of 500 million yen to Nishi Osaka Steel, despite the lack of proper financial investigation, to meet the target loan set by the head office. However, Nishi Osaka Steel goes bankrupt, and both president Mitsuru Higashida (Takashi Ukaji) and the 500 million yen loan disappear. Asano shifts the blame to Hanzawa and orders him to recover the amount or face termination. Hanzawa promises that if he manages to recover the money, Asano must kneel and apologize to him.

Hanzawa joins forces with Kiyohiko Takeshita (Hidekazu Akai), whose business was lost as collateral damage from Nishi Osaka Steel's bankruptcy. The two discover that the entire event was a scheme set up by Asano and Higashida who turned out to be childhood friends. It is revealed that Osaka Steel is purposely bankrupted by Higashida to defraud 500 millions yen from the bank and Asano helped Higashida after being bribed 50 millions yen to pay back his loss in a stock scheme went wrong. Racing against time and the Taxation Office investigation, Naoki is able to recover the entire 500 million yen for the bank from Higashida's bank account from the New York Trust Bank, leaving Higashida's empty-handed and he is arrested later on. Hanzawa wishes to expose Asano to the media, but out of sympathy for his wife and family he instead leverages his evidence against Asano, ensuring that his subordinates can be promoted to positions of their choice. Asano formally apologizes to Hanzawa and states that he did all of this because he lost too much from his failed stock investment. Asano then kneels before Hanzawa to apologize to him as promise. Subsequently, Hanzawa is promoted to deputy Manager of the 2nd Operations Department at banks' Tokyo Headquarters while Asano is transferred to be the manager of the bank branch in the Philippine, much to his dismay as he will be forced to be away from his family.

=== Tokyo arc ===
One year later, Hanzawa is placed in charge of investigating Iseshima Hotel, which borrowed 20 billion yen from Tokyo Chuo Bank. The hotel suffered a loss of 12 billion yen, and with an FSA (Financial Services Agency) inspection coming up, the bank may potentially have to provide a loan loss provision of 150 billion yen should Iseshima Hotel be labelled bankrupt. Hanzawa discovers that Director Owada (Teruyuki Kagawa) was at the forefront of providing the loan to Iseshima Hotel, even though there was substantial evidence showing that the hotel was not in a good financial position. Kondo (Kenichi Takito), a friend of Hanzawa who works at Tamiya Electric, discovers that Owada was also behind an indirect loan to Laffite, a fashion company owned by Owada's wife. Hanzawa puts this evidence against Owada in front of a board of directors meeting and further exposes that Owada did this to oust the Chairman so he can take his position. Seeking personal revenge for his father's death, Hanzawa forces Owada to kneel down before him and apologize for his actions in front of all the board members, despite his supervisor and the Chairman's disapproval. During the final scene, Chairman Nakanowatari formally terminates Owada's employment while Hanzawa is "exiled" from the bank to Tokyo Central Securities by the Chairman in order to protect his career from the retaliation of Owada's faction within the bank.

== Episodes ==
| | Episode subtitle | Broadcast date | Ratings |
|---|---|---|---|
| Ep. 1 | Double Payback! A new hero arises to stand up against the evil superior!! Can the 500 million yen be recovered? War among the wives at the company housing, Promotion? Friendship? | July 7, 2013 | 19.4% |
| Ep. 2 | Avoid being framed by the superior! Double payback for his actions! | July 14, 2013 | 21.8% |
| Ep. 3 | Double payback for this superior! Saving a subordinate who is in trouble!? A traitor appears | July 28, 2013 | 22.9% |
| Ep. 4 | It is 10 times the payback! Betrayal between superior and subordinate | August 4, 2013 | 27.6% |
| Ep. 5 | Hanzawa's transfer…!? To fight to the death! | August 11, 2013 | 29.0% |
| Ep. 6 | 500 million to 1.2 billion! Double payback in Tokyo too? Hanzawa's battle with his nemesis!! | August 25, 2013 | 29.0% |
| Ep. 7 | Hanzawa kneels to beg! He faces a tough situation | September 1, 2013 | 30.0% |
| Ep. 8 | A tough rival appears! Losing will result in transfer | September 8, 2013 | 32.9% |
| Ep. 9 | The final showdown! ~Survive the FSA inspection or be transferred!! | September 15, 2013 | 35.9% |
| Ep. 10 | 100 times the payback! Who will be kneeling in the end! ~A shocking end!! Friendship? Betrayal? | September 22, 2013 | 42.2% |

== Recognitions ==
- 78th Television Drama Academy Awards: Best Actor - Masato Sakai
- 78th Television Drama Academy Awards: Best Supporting Actor - Teruyuki Kagawa
- 78th Television Drama Academy Awards: Best Director - Katsuo Fukuzawa
- 17th Nikkan Sports Drama Grand Prix (Jul-Sept 2013): Best Drama
- 17th Nikkan Sports Drama Grand Prix (Jul-Sept 2013): Best Actor - Masato Sakai
- 3rd Asia Contents Awards (October 2021): ACA Jury's Special Award
