= Ryosuke Otani =

Japanese actor and voice actor (born 1954)

- 大谷 亮介
- Born: March 18, 1954 (age 72); Hyōgo Prefecture, Japan
- Education: Rokko Junior and Senior High School; Tokyo University of Marine Science and Technology
- Occupations: Actor; voice actor
- Years active: 1977–present
- Agent: Fathers Corporation
- Known for: Aibō
- Height: 175 cm (5 ft 9 in)
- Spouse: Atsuko Takahata
- Children: Yuta Takahata

Ryosuke Otani (大谷 亮介, Ōtani Ryōsuke; born March 18, 1954) is a Japanese actor and voice actor represented by the talent agency Fathers Corporation. He graduated from Rokko Junior and Senior High School and Tokyo University of Marine Science and Technology.

== Biography ==
On 1986, Otani launched the Tokyo Ichi theatre troupe. He served with Kimiko Yo as head of the troupe for years.

After the troupe disbanded, he later launched Gekidan Ichi with Toru Kusano on 2001.

Otani was notable in Aibō as Shinsuke Miura and left the series after the first episode of season 12.

== Filmography ==
=== TV series ===
Year	Title	Role	Network	Notes
1971	Ōoka Echizen		TBS	
1996	Furuhata Ninzaburō	Mutsumi Kure	Fuji TV	
2000	Aibō	Shinsuke Miura	TV Asahi	
2002	Shōnen-tachi	Kentaro Morimoto	NHK	
	Warui Onna		TBS	
	Shin Momotaro Samurai		TV Asahi	
	Senchō Series 10 Taiheiyō Satsui no Uzu Shio	Higashiyama	TV Asahi	
2001	Bengoshi Igari Bunsuke-ji no Ken	Hiroshi Tanizaki	TBS	
2004	Sagashi-ya Moroboshi Hikari Kai ga Hashiru!		TBS	
2004	Shinsengumi!	Maki Yasuomi	NHK	Taiga drama
2006	Jirochō Seoifuji		NHK	
2006	Machiben		NHK	
2007	Fūrin Kazan	Yashiro Etchunokami	NHK	Taiga drama
2007	Horibe Yasubee	Jingoro Kubota	NHK	
2010	Katsura Chizuru Shinsatsu Nichiroku	Naohisa Shimotsuma	NHK	
2011	Zettai Reido	Taizo Sugiyama	Fuji TV	Episode 7
2013	Town Doctor Jumbo!!	Takeshi Nishikawa	YTV	Episode 1
2013	Orinpikku no Minoshirokin: 1964-nen Natsu	Sato	TV Asahi	
2014	Gunshi Kanbei	Sassa Narimasa	NHK	Taiga drama
2014	Hoshi Shinichi Mystery SP	Bartender	Fuji TV	
2014	Seijo	Taizo Chikura	NHK	
2014	Sakura: Jiken o Kiku Onna	Shusaku Yoshioka	TBS	Episode 6
2014	Kasōken no Onna	Kozo Numata	TV Asahi	14th Series, Episode 5
2015	Kyōto Ninjō Sōsa File	Toshiaki Kazama	TV Asahi	Episode 5
2015	Mito Kōmon	Nirasaki-gun samurai	TBS	
2015	Yukemuri Buster Sayaka Sakuraba no Jiken-bo	Taizo Hachiguchi	TBS	
2015	Risk no Kamisama	Daisuke Hanamura	Fuji TV	Episode 7
2016	Mikaiketsu Jiken: File. 05	Hisao Kamiya	NHK	
2019	Idaten	Ryōzō Hiranuma	NHK	Taiga drama

=== Films ===
Year	Title	Role	Notes
2000	Another Heaven		
	Nagasaki Burabura Bushi		
2007	I Just Didn't Do It		
2008	Aibō the Movie	Shinsuke Miura	
2008	Departures		
2009	Aibō Series Kanshiki Mamoru Yonezawa no Jiken-bo	Shinsuke Miura	
2010	Aibō: Gekijō-ban II	Shinsuke Miura	
2012	Key of Life	Apartment landlord	
2013	Aibō Series X Day	Shinsuke Miura	
2014	Aibō: Gekijō-ban III	Shinsuke Miura	
2019	Tezuka's Barbara		
