= Kotomi =

- Gender: Female

Origin
- Origin: Japanese
- Meaning: Different meanings depending on the kanji used

Kotomi (written: 琴美, 寿弥, こと美 or ことみ in hiragana) is a feminine Japanese given name. Its meaning comes from the koto 琴, which is a Japanese stringed instrument, and -mi 美, a name suffix meaning "beauty" or "beautiful", but depending on the kanji used it can have many different meanings. Notable people with the name include:

- Kotomi (born 1996), Japanese kickboxer
- Kotomi Aihara (藍原 ことみ; born 1990), Japanese voice actress and singer
- Kotomi Aoki (青木 琴美; born 1980), Japanese manga artist
- Kotomi Ishizaki (石崎 琴美; born 1979), Japanese curler
- Kotomi Kyono (京野 ことみ; born 1978), Japanese actress
- Li Kotomi (李琴峰; born 1989), Taiwanese fiction writer, translator, and essayist
- Kotomi Takahata (tennis) (高畑 寿弥; born 1989), Japanese tennis player
- Kotomi Takahata (actress) (高畑 こと美; born 1986), Japanese actress
- Kotomi Taniguchi (谷口 琴美; born 1995), Japanese rugby union player
- Kotomi Tosaki (戸崎 琴美; born 1989), Japanese volleyball player
- Kotomi Yamane (山根 ことみ; born 1974), Japanese women's shogi player

== Fictional characters ==
- Kotomi Ichinose (一ノ瀬 ことみ), a character in the visual novel Clannad
- Kotomi Irie (入江 琴美), a character in the manga series Itazura na Kiss
- Kotomi Takanashi (梨 ことみ), a character in the manga series DNA²
- Kotomi Tsuda (津田 コトミ), a character in the manga series Seitokai Yakuindomo
