= Takahata (surname) =

Takahata (written: 高畑 or 高畠) is a Japanese surname. Notable people with the surname include:

- Atsuko Takahata (高畑 淳子; born 1954), Japanese actress and voice actress
- Isao Takahata (高畑 勲; 1935–2018), Japanese film director, animator, screenwriter and producer
- Kotomi Takahata (tennis) (高畑 琴美; born 1989), Japanese tennis player
- Kotomi Takahata (actress) (高畑 こと美; born 1986), Japanese actress
- Mitsuki Takahata (高畑 充希; born 1991), Japanese actress and singer
- Tsutomu Takahata (高畠 勉; born 1968), Japanese footballer and manager
