= Kotomi Takahata =

Kotomi Takahata may refer to:

- Kotomi Takahata (actress)
- Kotomi Takahata (tennis)
