= Shadowverse: Worlds Beyond =

2025 video game

- Developer: Cygames
- Publisher: Cygames
- Composer: Yoshihiro Ike
- Series: Shadowverse
- Engine: Unity
- Platforms: iOS, Android, Microsoft Windows, macOS
- Release: iOS, Android, Windows, macOS: WW: June 17, 2025
- Genre: Collectible card game
- Modes: Single-player, multiplayer

Shadowverse: Worlds Beyond is a digital collectible card game developed and published by Cygames. It was released free-to-play for iOS, Android, Windows, and macOS on June 17, 2025.

Worlds Beyond is a sequel to Shadowverse. It employs a similar anime art style, along with many cards and characters being reused, usually with different text and art. This game continues the employment of Shadowverse's unique mechanic, evolution, which employs the use of "evolution points" to boost cards and activate extra effects. A new mechanic, featured as the sale point of this game, is the Super Evolution mechanic.

== Gameplay ==
Worlds Beyond matches are structured between two people, or one person and a bot, where players play and draw cards from their deck. Each player is represented by a "leader" character, and the goal of the game is to bring the enemy leader's defense to 0 points. The game begins with both players drawing 4 cards from their 40-card deck. Decks are created through a deck-creating process, which occurs before the game starts, where players choose one of the seven classes ("-crafts") and creates a deck that incorporates cards from that specific class, as well as cards from the "Neutral" class, if so desired.

In addition to this, the "Take-Two" format, which was released on August 4, 2025, in Worlds Beyond allows for a "draft" style of gameplay, where players "take" a pair of cards 14 times, leading to a 30 card deck when the two starting cards are counted. Player's choose their class, and then begin drafting, leading to more variety in gameplay and increased strategic thinking.

The Evolution mechanic was standardized in Worlds Beyond, along with a few other changes to keywords and gameplay that differentiate it from the previous iteration of the game. Firstly, Super Evolution and Evolution have both been standardized to add 3 or 2, respectively, to both the attack and defense stats of a card. Super Evolution maintains Evolution's gain of the "Rush" keyword, allowing the "follower" to attack another follower the same turn it is played. However, it gives the follower the inability to be destroyed during the player's turn, as well as granting a sort of "blow-back" effect where if an opposing follower is destroyed by the follower's attack or effect, the opposing leader takes 1 damage. A key point to note is that Super Evolving activates Evolve effects, as well as Super Evolve effects.

The seven classes, or "-craft's" in the game are: Forestcraft, Swordcraft, Runecraft, Dragoncraft, Havencraft, Portalcraft, and Abysscraft. Aside from Abysscraft, all are returning "-craft's" from Shadowverse. Abysscraft, which premiered in Shadowverse: Evolve, which is the in person card game version of Shadowverse, works to mesh together the Shadowcraft and Bloodcraft classes from Shadowverse, due to their similarities.

== Development and release ==
Shadowverse: Worlds Beyond was directed by Yuito Kimura. Super Evolution, a mechanic that powers up the player characters, was added to differentiate the game from the predecessor.

Worlds Beyond was announced in December 2023. Pre-registration became available on 13 March, including various in-game rewards. It supports English, Japanese, Korean, Traditional Chinese, and Simplified Chinese language options. The game was launched on 17 June 2025 for Microsoft Windows, iOS, and Android.

== Reception ==
Shadowverse: Worlds Beyond generated $21.7 million in gross player spending in its first week, over four times the original Shadowverse's performance during the same period.

Worlds Beyond received generally negative reviews from players, with criticism over its microtransactions and monetization.
