= AIBOU: The Movie II =

- Film poster

Japanese name
- Kanji: 相棒-劇場版II- 警視庁占拠！特命係の一番長い夜
- Directed by: Seiji Izumi
- Screenplay by: Yasuhiro Koizuma; Masashi Todayama
- Music by: Yoshihiro Ike
- Production companies: TV Asahi; Toei Company; Try-some; Shogakukan; ABC; Nagoya TV; Mother Enterprise
- Distributed by: Toei Company, Ltd.
- Release date: December 23, 2010
- Running time: 119 minutes
- Country: Japan
- Language: Japanese
- Box office: US$38 million

AIBOU: Gekijō-ban II (相棒-劇場版II- 警視庁占拠！特命係の一番長い夜, Aibō - Gekijō-ban II - Keishichō Senkyo! Tokumei-gakari no Ichiban Nagaiyo; lit. BUDDY -Theatrical Version II- Metro Police Department Occupation! The Special Clerk's Longest Night) is a 2010 Japanese suspense mystery film directed by Seiji Izumi. The film is the second instalment in the film series based on the television series AIBOU: Tokyo Detective Duo, being preceded by the 2008 film AIBOU: The Movie and followed by the 2013 film AIBOU: The Movie III. The film was released on December 23, 2010.

== Cast ==
- Yutaka Mizutani
- Mitsuhiro Oikawa
- Kazuhisa Kawahara
- Ryūsuke Ōtani
- Takashi Yamanaka
- Seiji Rokkaku as Mamoru Yonezawa

== Reception ==
The film was number-one at the Japanese box office for three consecutive weekends in both 2010 and 2011 and grossed US$38 million.
