= Cube (talent agency) =

Japanese talent agency

CUBE. Inc.
- Native name: 株式会社キューブ
- Company type: Kabushiki gaisha (Joint-stock company)
- Traded as: Unlisted
- Industry: Service industry (entertainment)
- Genre: Tarento, entertainment industry management, musical production
- Founded: July 1997
- Headquarters: T&T Building 8th Floor, Higashi 3-25-10, Shibuya, Tokyo, Japan; ZIP 150-0011
- Area served: Japan
- Key people: Hiroyuki Kitamaki (Representative director)
- Website: www.cubeinc.co.jp

CUBE. Inc. (株式会社キューブ) is a Japanese talent agency headquartered in Shibuya, Tokyo. It was founded in 1997 and focuses on talent management for actors, musicians, announcers, content creators and tarento. Cube also provides music, theater and other entertainment production services. The company also operates in Osaka as another agency called Ricomotion inc. (株式会社リコモーション).

In January 2020, one of the agency's talents, Ikimono-gakari's guitarist, Yamashita was reported by entertainment tabloid magazine Friday for non-consensual advances on a woman. The president of Cube, Hiryoyuki Kitamaki made a statement regarding the news, declining all accusations made by the entertainment tabloid magazine as non factual.

== Notable talents ==
=== Male ===
==== Under Cube Inc. ====
- Kenji Ebisawa
- Ken'ya Ōsumi
- Ryō Katō
- Ryuji Kamiyama
- Yūji Kishi
- Nobuo Kyo
- Ryosei Konishi
- Kong Kuwata
- Naohito Fujiki
- Kunio Murai
- Kentarō Ōtani

==== Under Ricomotion inc. ====
- Katsuhisa Namase
- Arata Furuta
- Atsushi Yamanishi

=== Female ===
==== Under Cube Inc. ====
- Noriko Nakagoshi
- First Summer Uika

==== Under Ricomotion inc. ====
- Akoya Sogi

=== Musicians ===
- Junna
- Tokyo Performance Doll
- The Mass Missile
- ManaKana

=== Former talents ===
- Ikimono-gakari
- Satoshi Hashimoto
