= Seiji Rokkaku =

Japanese actor (born 1962)

- 六角 精児
- Born: June 24, 1962 (age 64); Himeji, Hyōgo Prefecture, Japan
- Occupation: Actor
- Years active: 1990–present
- Agent: Gekidan Tobiraza
- Website: tobiraza.co.jp/actors/rokkaku-seiji

Seiji Rokkaku (六角 精児, Rokkaku Seiji; born June 24, 1962) is a Japanese actor from Hyōgo Prefecture. He was born in Himeji and raised in Takasago. Rokkaku is the vocalist of Rokkaku Seiji Band. He dropped out of Gakushuin University.

Rokkaku became famous in Japan for his role as Mamoru Yonezawa in Aibou Series. He landed the lead role in AIBOU Series: Yonezawa Mamoru no Jikenbo spin-off film of AIBOU series.

== Selected filmography ==
=== Film ===
- One Missed Call (2003)
- Hinokio (2005)
- Tokyo Tower: Mom and Me, and Sometimes Dad (2007), Editor-in-chief
- AIBOU: The Movie (2008), Mamoru Yonezawa
- AIBOU Series: Yonezawa Mamoru no Jikenbo (2009), Mamoru Yonezawa
- AIBOU: The Movie II (2010), Mamoru Yonezawa
- 13 Assassins (2010), Otake Mosuke
- Leonie (2010), Postman
- Gekkō no Kamen (2012), Morinoya Kinta
- Samurai Hustle (2014), Imamura Seizaemon
- Partners: The Movie III (2014), Mamoru Yonezawa
- Samurai Hustle Returns (2016), Imamura Seizaemon
- Gintama (2017), Char Aznable
- Under the Open Sky (2021), Ryōsuke Matsumoto
- The Fable (2019), Bar master
- Wedding High (2022), Daizō Nitta
- What to Do with the Dead Kaiju? (2022), the Chief Cabinet Secretary
- Anime Supremacy! (2022), Seki
- Convenience Story (2022), Nagumo
- Baian the Assassin, M.D. (2023), Tamekichi
- Hey Handsome!! (2024), Takao's father
- Curling Dream (2024)
- Doctor-X: The Movie (2024), Akagawa
- Petals and Memories (2025), Kōichi Shigeta
- Samurai Hustle: Full Throttle (2027), Imamura Seizaemon

=== Television ===
- Carnation (2012) as Megumi Matsuda
- AIBOU: Tokyo Detective Duo (2000–2017) as Mamoru Yonezawa
- Mare (2015) as Anzai Hayato
- Naotora: The Lady Warlord (2017) as Honda Masanobu
- Half Blue Sky (2018) as Mitsuru Saionj
- Ochoyan (2020) as Katagane Heihachi
- 24 Japan (2020) as Banba Eiiji
- DCU: Deep Crime Unit (2022) as Hideki Tsukishima (ep. 4)
- Lost Man Found (2022) as Arita
- Elpis (2022)
- Gannibal (2022–25), Kiyoshi Gotō
- Kochira yobi jieieiyūho?! (NTV, 2026)

=== Culture program ===
- Rokkaku Seiji no Nomitetsu Honsen Nihontabi (2015–present)

=== Theatre ===
- Les Miserables (2021, 2024-2025) as Thenardier
