= Kazuhisa Kawahara =

Kazuhisa Kawahara may refer to:

- Kazuhisa Kawahara (footballer) (born 1987), Japanese footballer
- Kazuhisa Kawahara (actor) (born 1961), Japanese actor
