= Yamanishi =

Yamanishi (written: 山西) is a Japanese surname. Notable people with the surname include:

- Atsushi Yamanishi (山西 惇, born 1962), Japanese actor
- Takahiro Yamanishi (山西 尊裕, born 1976), Japanese footballer
- Toshikazu Yamanishi (山西 利和, born 1996), Japanese racewalker

== See also ==
- 8097 Yamanishi, a main-belt asteroid
- Yamanashi Prefecture, a prefecture in the Chūbu region of Honshu, Japan
