= Shadowverse (TV series) =

Japanese anime television series

- Key visual

シャドウバース (Shadoubāsu)
- Created by: Cygames
- Anime television series
- Directed by: Keiichiro Kawaguchi
- Written by: Rintaro Isaki; Deko Akao
- Music by: Yoshihiro Ike
- Studio: Zexcs
- Licensed by: Crunchyroll
- Original network: TXN (TV Tokyo)
- Original run: April 7, 2020 – March 23, 2021
- Episodes: 48
- Anime television series

Shadowverse Flame
- Directed by: Keiichiro Kawaguchi
- Written by: Rintaro Isaki; Deko Akao
- Music by: Yoshihiro Ike
- Studio: Zexcs
- Licensed by: Crunchyroll
- Original network: TXN (TV Tokyo)
- Original run: April 2, 2022 – September 28, 2024
- Episodes: 98 (+ 4 SP)
- icon

Shadowverse (Note: シャドウバース, Shadoubāsu) is a Japanese anime television series adaptation of its namesake video game. The series is animated by Zexcs and directed by Keiichiro Kawaguchi, with Rintaro Isaki and Deko Akao handling series composition, Hiroki Harada designing the characters, and Yoshihiro Ike composing the series' music. The series aired from April 7, 2020, to March 23, 2021, on TV Tokyo and has been simulcast internationally on Crunchyroll. The band Penguin Research performed the first opening theme, "Kirifuda" (lit. Trump Card), while Yui Ogura performed the first ending theme, "Happiness Sensation". The second opening theme, "Shinsekai" (New World), was performed by FLOW, while the second ending theme, "Kokoro Darenimo" (Heart to Everyone), was performed by the Game Jikkyōsha Wakuwaku Band.

A second anime series, Shadowverse Flame, aired from April 2, 2022, to September 28, 2024. The main staff members return to reprise their roles. The first opening theme is "Shingan" (The Mind's Eye) by Lanndo featuring Keina Suda, while the 1st ending theme is "My Turn" by Yui Ogura. The second opening theme is "Tomoshibi" by Half time Old, while the 2nd ending theme is "Shekenale" by Ocha Norma. The third opening theme is "Do or Die" by Nano, while the third ending theme is "Heavy Gamer" by LIL LEAGUE.

== Plot ==
=== Season 1 ===
Hiro Ryūgasaki is an ordinary middle school student at Tensei Academy. Through a strange occurrence, Hiiro obtains a mysterious smartphone with the popular digital card game Shadowverse app installed. Through the game, Hiro meets rivals, meets new friends, participates in tournaments, and forms bonds with others. Later, Hiro and his friends discover that the true purpose of Shadowverse is to save the world from an impending doomsday event.

=== Season 2: Shadowverse Flame ===
Set three years after the events of the first season. Light Tenryu enrolls at Shadowverse College after receiving an invite and pre-loaded deck from the school's founder, Wolfram Zerga. Light has no idea how to even play Shadowverse at first but is told the college is the key to his destiny. He soon joins a soon to be disbanded club called "Seventh Flame." Meanwhile, the newly reformed Genesis Corp has started research into a new artifact called the Arc that has been mysteriously stolen.

== Characters ==
=== Season 1 ===
Hiro Ryugasaki (竜ヶ崎ヒイロ)
Voiced by: Gakuto Kajiwara
Hiro is a 2nd-year middle school student at Tensei Academy. He is extremely perseverant and has a strong genuine love for the game. He lives with his grandfather and had long believed that his parents died during an accident while he was young, however it was later revealed his parents are trapped inside the Tree of Woe, an invention developed by his father's company that backfired and was destined to destroy the world. He plays the Dragoncraft class. He returns in the second season as a member of the Seven Shadows, the top Shadowverse players in the world who hold a secret behind Light's Digifriend Draconir. He has also come to use the Portalcraft class.
Luca Yonazuki (夜那月ルシア)
Voiced by: Junya Enoki
Luca is a middle school student at a different school than Hiro's. At a young age, a truck killed his parents and badly injured his sister, Shiori, who lives in a rehabilitation hospital. Luca plays Shadowverse with the goal to raise enough money for Shiori to recover. He is rarely happy due to Shiori's condition, much to Shiori's chagrin who just wants to see her older brother smile. He plays the Bloodcraft class. He returns in the second season as a member of the Seven Shadows, the top Shadowverse players in the world who hold a secret behind Light's Digifriend Draconir.
Mimori Amamiya (天宮ミモリ)
Voiced by: Kaede Hondo
Mimori is Hiro's classmate and one of his best friends. She worries a lot about being too ordinary. She also is not a fan of ghosts and other scary things. She plays the Forestcraft class. She returns in the second season having continued her education and became a high schooler.
Kazuki Shindo (進藤カズキ)
Voiced by: Hayato Taya
Kazuki is Hiro's classmate and one of his best friends. He is great at sports, but still has room for improvement when it comes to Shadowverse. Due to having to take care of his six younger brothers and sisters, he is surprisingly responsible. He plays the Swordcraft class. He returns in the second season having become close friends with Kai and now runs his family's restaurant.
Kai Ijuin (伊集院カイ)
Voiced by: Atsumi Tanezaki
Kai is a 1st-year middle school student at Tensei Academy. He became part of Hiro's group of friends after hearing about him beating the school bully Takuma and challenging him to a Shadowverse duel. He is extremely analytical and proclaims himself as a "genius among geniuses". He plays the Runecraft class. He returns in the second season having become close friends to Kazuki.
Alice Kurobane (黒羽アリス)
Voiced by: Yui Ogura
Alice is a child idol with millions of fans. She enjoys Shadowverse but it gives her mixed feelings as her managers force her to play "cute" cards which prevent her from playing and enjoying Shadowverse to her full potential. She became part of Hiro's group of friends when bumping into Mimori at a mall and challenging her to a game of Shadowverse. She plays the Shadowcraft class. She returns in the second season showing she has continued her idol career and gives advice to Light.
Mauro Abelard (マウラ・アベラルド)
Voiced by: Yūichi Iguchi
Mauro is a teenager whom Hiro first met at the semi-finals of the National Shadowverse Tournament, but appeared to mysteriously already know Hiro and his father. He takes great thrill in slowly chasing his opponents and backing them into a corner. Later it's revealed he was alone and homeless as a child, so Leon adopted him, with the sole purpose of developing Mauro's Shadowverse skills so he can eventually sacrifice his life to save the world from the Tree of Woe. He plays the Havencraft class. He returns in the second season working for the Genesis Corporation to help them keep their ARC project and the events of the first season a secret.
Leon Aurenche (レオン・オーランシュ)
Voiced by: Toshiyuki Morikawa
Leon is the CEO of Genesis Corp, the creator of Shadowverse. Originally his company was inventing the Tree of Blessings which was designed to bring good fortune to the world, only for it to backfire and become the Tree of Woe which will eventually destroy the world. Leon then invented the Shadowverse game with the purpose of shutting down the Tree of Woe and saving the world. Formerly plays the Havencraft class, he currently plays the Portalcraft class.
Marguerite Valois (マルグリット・ヴァロワ)
Voiced by: Satomi Akesaka
Marguerite is Leon's secretary who sometimes accuses Leon of being impulsive. She has become the new CEO of Genesis Corp in the second season after the events of the first season.

=== Season 2 ===
Light Tenryu
Voiced by: Yūto Uemura
A brand new student at Shadowverse College. He has never played Shadowverse before the start of the season. He's bad with machines and bad at lying. He's very good though at keeping his promises. His Digifriend is the mysterious Draconir. He plays using the Dragoncraft class.
Draconir
Light's Digifriend that has the unusual ability to actually talk. He has lost his memories of an alleged life before his time with Light that may have something to do with the mysterious Arc artifact. Light is lead to believe that the Seven Shadows hold pieces of Draconir's missing memory.
Itsuki Mitsutagawa
President of the Seventh Flame club. He prefers cute and flowery things which alienated him from other kids growing up. His Digifriend is Slade. He plays using the Forestcraft class.
Subaru Makabe
Light's first friend at Shadowverse College. He prefers to be laid back and not take things seriously. He actually resents Shadowverse because of the pressure from his family to become a pro at it but becomes more serious and confident after joining Seventh Flame. His Digifriend is Baccherus. He plays using the Shadowcraft class.
Shion Otosaka
A solitary and reclusive person. She's incredibly smart but has a hard time connecting with others. This leads to her only interacting with others via her digital avatar, Lady & Gentleman. Originally the secret president of the Sixth Magic club, she joined Seventh Flame after losing to Light. Her Digifriend is Milady and she plays using the Runecraft class.
Ren Kazamatsuri
She's a very athletic and ditzy person with a love of heroes. This alienates her from others around her due to her not being girly enough. She was originally from the Fifth Sword club but joined Seventh Flame in hopes of getting to be who she truly is. Her Digifriend is Amyroth and she plays using the Swordcraft class. She wanted to make friends with Hina.
Tsubasa Takanashi
Former president of the Third Feather club. She initially lost interest in Shadowverse after her best friend quit the game after repeated harassment from Haruma Hazeura. She has since become more confident and assertive after joining Seventh Flame. Her Digifriend is Wingy and she plays using the Havencraft class. She mourn Andrea in episode 83.
Ryoga Jasei
Former student & president of Shadoba Collage's Second Blood. The only things he cares about are his love of metal music and crushing people in Shadowverse. He considers everything else as unnecessary noise. His Digifriend is Demonium but rejects him and he plays using the Bloodcraft class.
Haruma Hazeura
President of the First Reaper club. An enemy of Light, who intends to destroy Seventh Flame. He became cold hearted and focused on crushing anyone he considers weak after repeated losses to Mikado. He plays using the Shadowcraft class.
Mikado Shirogane
Board chairman of Shadowverse Battle College. His Digifriend is Garuel. He initially looks childish and just wants to have fun. In reality he's cold-hearted and views everyone around him as boring toys for him to break. He plays using only Neutral cards (ones not tied to any of the seven classes).
Andrea Rondo
Voiced by Fumiko Orikasa
Andrea survived the fall but has a broken right arm.
Hina Sinclair
Voiced by Inori Minase
Hina ran away from home. It is revealed that she survived the fall.
Mrs. Rondo
Voiced by Unknown
She is the mother of Andrea Rondo. Her director stole her theories when Andrea was young.

== Episodes ==
=== Shadowverse ===
No. in season	Title
1	"This is Shadowverse!!"
2	"Hiro's Resolve"
3	"The Plot of the Genius Among Geniuses"
4	"Something Special"
5	"Fierce Battle! Hiro vs. Kazuki!"
6	"The Reason For Strength"
7	"Aim for Master Rank!"
9	"The National Tournament Finals Begin!"
9	"The Curtain Rises! A Beautiful Witch Show!"
10	"Maura's Spellcasting!"
11	"Hiro vs. Lucia!"
12	"Who Will Claim Victory?"
13	"The Shadow Grand Prix Begins"
14	"A Mouthwatering Battle! Marcel Tabeoka!"
15	"Super Rich! Miyabi Zaizenji!"
16	"An Invitation to the Underworld! The Justine Sisters!"
17	"Special and Ordinary"
18	"A Terrible Trap! Zuo and Ko"
19	"Bearers of Shadow!"
20	"A Smile that's Black"
21	"Battle of Destiny"
22	"Conclusion, and..."
23	"Unknown Encounter"
24	"Blessing and Woe"
25	"Seven Hopes"
26	"Grab the Legend"
27	"The Ultimate Dragon"
28	"Overlapping Answers"
29	"Proof That I Am Me"
30	"Resolve and Courage"
31	"Hero's Blade"
32	"Footsteps of Hope"
33	"Fate of Destruction"
34	"Battle of Despair"
35	"Prelude to the End"
36	"A Heart That Believes"
37	"A Voice That Calls to Awaken"
38	"Hiro and the Black Dragon Knight!"
39	"Mimori's an Idol"
40	"Alice's Truth"
41	"Kazuki's Great Escape!"
42	"Kai and the Forbidden Magic"
43	"Mauro's Wish. A Longing that Cannot Be!"
44	"Lucia and the Undead King"
45	"The Castle in the Sky"
46	"The Ruler of the World"
47	"Time of Evolution"
48	"Battle! Shadowverse!"

=== Shadowverse Flame ===
No. in season	Title
1	"My Shadowverse Starts Here!"
2	"This Is My Brilliant Plan!"
3	"I Can Tell Because We Battled!"
4	"Lady & Gentleman!"
5	"Do Me a Favor"
6	"Courage Will Always Give You Strength!"
7	"That's My Strength!"
8	"Expectations Are a Curse"
9	"Show Me Your Battle!"
10	"There's No Point in Getting Serious"

=== Shadowverse Flame: Seven Shadows-hen ===
No. in season	Title
1	"We Challenge the Strongest!"
2	"I Accept Your Challenge!"
3	"That's Your Weakness"
4	"I'll Make It a Defeat That Means Something!"
5	"It's Not Just Despair, Right?"

=== Shadowverse Flame: Arc-hen ===
No. in season	Title	
1	"For the sake of the world, we will defeat you!"	
2	"Judgement has already been passed"	
3	"You're fighting against four!"	
4	"Open a path to the future!"	
5	"I'll pay the world back for what it's done to me!"	May 11, 2024
6	"So this what you call anger"	
7	"This is the truth of everything!"	
8	"I'm simply following my destiny"	
