= Atsushi Yamanishi =

Japanese actor represented by Ricomotion (born 1962)

- 山西 惇
- Born: December 12, 1962 (age 63); Kyoto, Kyoto Prefecture, Japan
- Other names: Atsushi Hatanaka (畑中 敦史, Hatanaka Atsushi; real name)
- Education: Todaiji Gakuen; Kyoto University
- Occupation: Actor
- Years active: 1994–present
- Agent: Ricomotion

Atsushi Yamanishi (山西 惇, Yamanishi Atsushi; born December 12, 1962, in Kyoto, Kyoto Prefecture, Japan) is a Japanese actor represented by Ricomotion.

== Filmography ==
=== TV series ===
Year	Title	Role	Notes	Ref.
2001–2023	AIBOU: Tokyo Detective Duo	Rokuro Tsunoda	22 seasons	
2016	Sanada Maru	Itabeoka Kōsetsusai	Taiga drama	
2021	Shikatanakatta to Iute wa Ikan no desu		TV movie	

=== Films ===
Year	Title	Role	Notes	Ref.
2008	AIBOU: The Movie	Rokuro Tsunoda		
2009	Partners: CSI Files	Rokuro Tsunoda		
2010	AIBOU: The Movie II	Rokuro Tsunoda		
2013	AIBOU: X Day	Rokuro Tsunoda		
2014	AIBOU: The Movie III	Rokuro Tsunoda		
2024	Sisam			
2025	Army on the Tree	Miyagi		

=== Video games ===
Year	Title	Role	Notes	Ref.
1995	Real Bout Fatal Fury	Billy Kane		
1996	Samurai Shodown IV	Kazuki Kazama		
1997	Real Bout Fatal Fury Special	Billy Kane		
1997	The King of Fighters '97	Billy Kane		
1997	Samurai Shodown 64	Kazuki Kazama		
1998	Real Bout Fatal Fury 2: The Newcomers	Billy Kane		
1998	The King of Fighters '98	Billy Kane		
1998	The King of Fighters: Kyo	Billy Kane		
1998	Samurai Shodown 64: Warriors Rage	Kazuki Kazama		
1999	Fatal Fury: Wild Ambition	Billy Kane		
2002	The King of Fighters 2002	Billy Kane		
2003	Samurai Shodown V	Kazuki Kazama		
