= Kei Honda =

Japanese shogi player (born 1997)

- Native name: 本田奎
- Born: July 5, 1997 (age 28)
- Hometown: Kawasaki, Kanagawa

Career
- Achieved professional status: October 1, 2018 (aged 21)
- Badge Number: 315
- Rank: 6-dan
- Teacher: Toshio Miyata (8-dan)
- Meijin class: C2
- Ryūō class: 2

Websites
- JSA profile page

Kei Honda (本田 奎, Honda Kei; July 5, 1997) is a Japanese professional shogi player ranked 6-dan.

== Early life and apprenticeship ==
Honda was born in Kawasaki, Kanagawa on July 5, 1997. He learned how to play shogi from his father when he was about five years old. In September 2009 while he was still an elementary school sixth-grade student, he was accepted into the Japan Shogi Association (JSA) apprentice school under the guidance of shogi professional Toshio Miyata at the rank of 6-kyū.

Honda was promoted to the rank of apprentice professional 3-dan in April 2015. It was around this time that he began to seriously use computer shogi programs into his practice routines, and stated that he believes doing so really helped to improve his game. He obtained full professional status and the corresponding rank of 4-dan on October 1, 2018, after winning the 63rd 3-dan League (April–September 2018) with a record of 15 wins and 3 losses.

== Shogi professional ==
In December 2019, Honda earned the to right to challenge Akira Watanabe for the 45th Kiō title. Honda had advanced through the challenger tournament undefeated and advanced to the two-game challenger determination match against Daichi Sasaki. Sasaki had lost in the semi-finals of the challenger tournament, but advanced to the challenger determination match by winning the three-player double-elimination full repechage tournament for the two losers in the semi-final round and the loser in the final round of the challenger tournament to determine the player to face Honda. As the outright winner of the challenger tournament, Honda only needed to defeat Sasaki once to become the challenger for the Kiō title, whereas Sasaki needed to win two games to become challenger.

Honda lost the first game between the two held on December 16, 2019, but won the second game held on December 27. Honda's win made him the first player to earn the right to challenge for a major title in his first attempt under the current eight-major-title system. It also made him the second fastest player ever to become the challenger for a major title since turning professional at one year and two months, and also made him the first 4-dan professional to become the challenger for a major title since 1992. In the 45th Kiō title match, Honda was unable to stop Watanabe from defending his title, losing the match 3 games to 1.

=== Promotion history ===
Honda's promotion history is as follows:

- 6-kyū: September 2009
- 3-dan: April, 2015:
- 4-dan: October 1, 2018
- 5-dan: December 27, 2019
- 6-dan: May 1, 2023

=== Titles and other championships ===
Honda's only appearance in a major title match was in 2020 when he was the challenger for the 45th Kiō title.

=== Awards and honors ===
Honda won the Japan Shogi Association’s Annual Shogi Award for “Best New Player” for the 2019 shogi year (April 2019–March 2020).

== Personal life ==
Honda is married to women's shogi professional Kotomi Yamane. The JSA officially announced the couple's marriage on its website on May 2, 2023.
