= Château de la Reine =

- Poster
- 王妃の館
- Directed by: Hajime Hashimoto
- Release date: April 25, 2015
- Running time: 123 minutes
- Country: Japan
- Language: Japanese
- Box office: ¥50.51 million (Japan)

Château de la Reine (王妃の館, Ōhi no yakata) is a 2015 Japanese comedy drama film directed by Hajime Hashimoto. It was released on April 25, 2015.

== Cast ==
- Yutaka Mizutani
- Rena Tanaka
- Kazue Fukiishi
- Hiroyuki Onoue
- Munetaka Aoki
- Tomoya Nakamura
- Yumi Adachi

== Reception ==
The film earned ¥50.51 million on its opening weekend in Japan.
