= Gekkō no Kamen =

- Directed by: Itsuji Itao
- Screenplay by: Itsuji Itao
- Starring: Itsuji Itao; Tadanobu Asano; Satomi Ishihara
- Release date: January 14, 2012
- Country: Japan
- Language: Japanese

Gekkō no Kamen (月光ノ仮面) is a 2012 Japanese film written and directed by Itsuji Itao.

== Cast ==
- Itsuji Itao
- Tadanobu Asano
- Satomi Ishihara
- Seiji Rokkaku as Morinoya Kinta
