= ManaKana =

Japanese acting duo

Mana Mikura
- 三倉茉奈
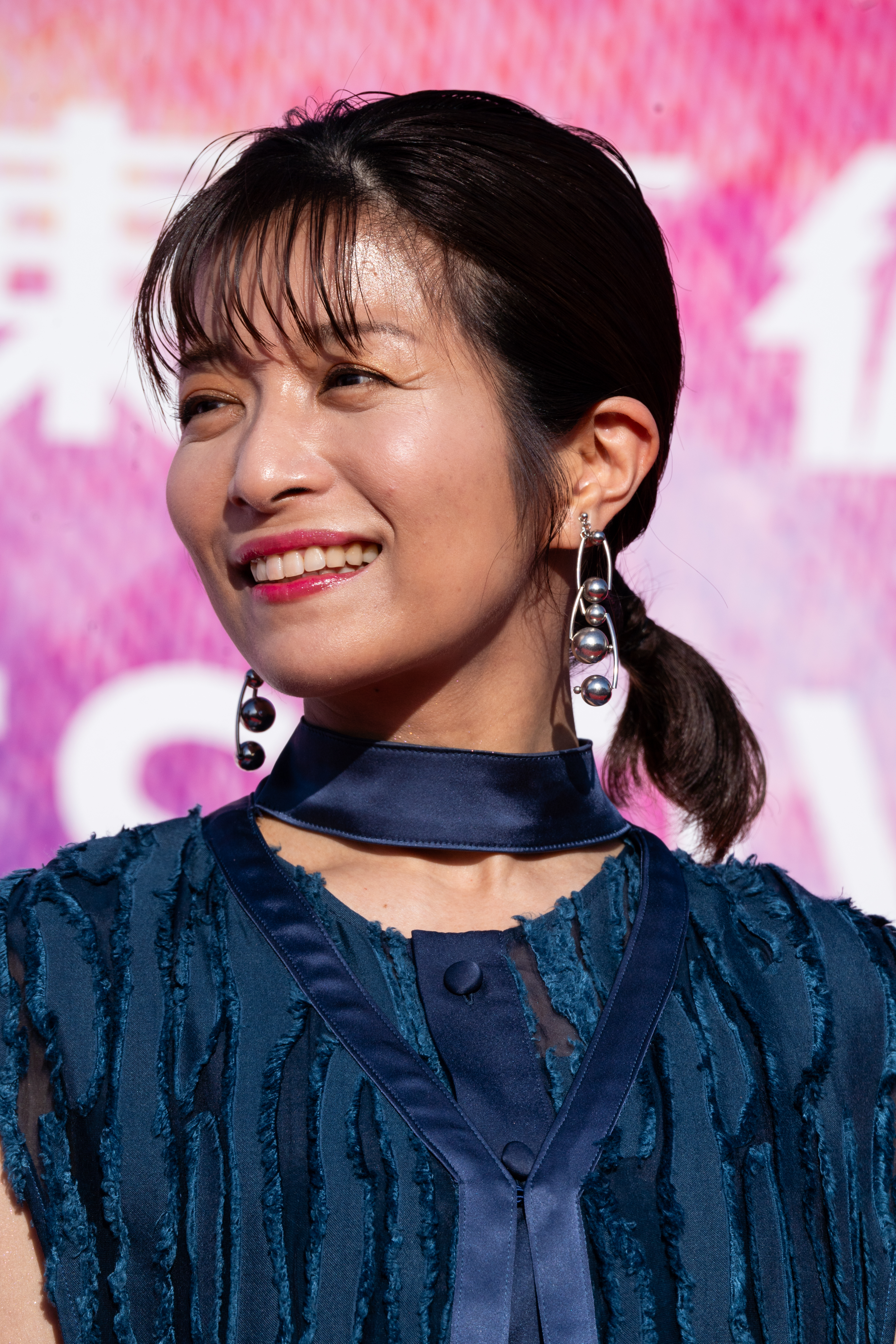
- Mikura at the 2nd Yokohama International Film Festival in 2024
- Born: February 23, 1986 (age 40); Hirano-ku, Osaka, Japan
- Occupation: Actress
- Years active: 1991 — present
- Agent: Cube
- Relatives: Kana Mikura (sister)
- Website: https://manakana.jp/

Kana Mikura
- 三倉佳奈
- Born: February 23, 1986 (age 40); Hirano-ku, Osaka, Japan
- Occupation: Actress
- Years active: 1991 — present
- Agent: Cube
- Relatives: Mana Mikura (sister)

Mana Mikura (三倉 茉奈, Mikura Mana) and Kana Mikura (三倉 佳奈, Mikura Kana) (born February 23, 1986) are Japanese identical twin sister actresses. They are mostly collectively referred to as ManaKana (マナカナ). They were born in Osaka, Osaka. Mana is the older one, born 7 minutes before Kana.

== History ==
- They debuted at the age of 5, appearing in television commercials.
- In 1996, they appeared in the Asadora Futarikko, playing the main twin characters as children.
- In March 2008, both graduated from Kwansei Gakuin University.
- In 2008, they starred in the Asadora Dandan about twins separated in infancy. Mana played a Shimane Prefecture school girl who loves to play in a rock band. Kana played a maiko from Kyoto Prefecture.

== Discography ==
=== ManaKana ===
1. Nisenichiya no Mew (二千一夜のミュウ) (1997.03.20)
2. Up to Me (アップトゥミー) (1997.08.21)
3. Odoru Pompokolin (おどるポンポコリン, Odoru Ponpokorin) (1998.07.01)
4. Jyaga Buttercorn-san (じゃがバタコーンさん) (1998.07.01)
5. Chibi Maruko-chan (ちびまる子ちゃん) (1998.07.18)

=== Mana Kana (茉奈 佳奈) ===
1. Nigatsu no Watayuki (二月のわた雪) (2007.01.31)
2. Fighting Girl (2007.09.19)
3. Naite Waratte (泣いて笑って) (2008.01.30)
