= Todaiji Gakuen =

Private school in Nara, Japan

Coordinates: 34°42′48″N 135°47′20.3″E

- Japanese: 東大寺学園
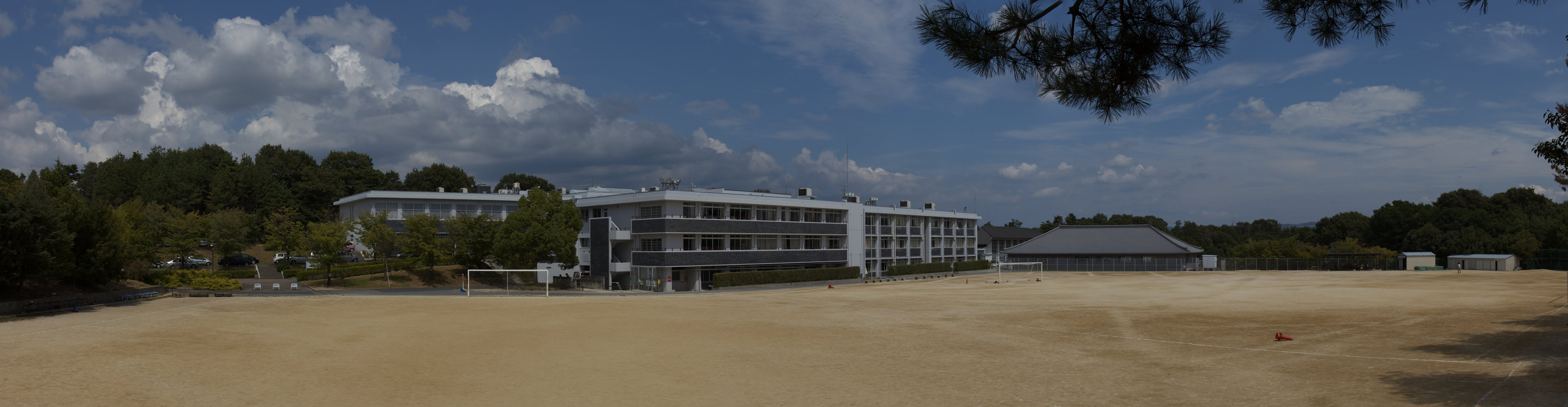

Information
- School type: Private school
- Established: 1926; 100 years ago

Tōdaiji Gakuen (Japanese: 東大寺学園, romanized: Tōdaiji Gakuen is a private school, combined middle and high school in the city of Nara, Japan.

== History ==
The school was founded in 1926 as an offshoot of Tōdai-ji temple. It began as an evening middle school (夜間中学) for working students. Daytime education began in 1963, when the current name was adopted, and evening education was dropped in 1977.

== Noted alumni ==
- Tetsuji Nakamura, member of the House of Representatives
- Kazuyoshi Shirahama, House of Councillors member
- Shinichi Kitaoka, United Nations representative
- Ryōsuke Yasunami, associate justice of the Supreme Court of Japan
- Takahiro Kimura, animator and character designer
- Ichirō Sakaki, light novel writer
- Banmei Takahashi, film director
- Atsushi Yamanishi, actor
- Shinichi Kitaoka, political scientist
- Kan Kimura, Professor, Kobe University
