= Vampire in the Garden =

Japanese original net animation

- Promotional poster

ヴァンパイア・イン・ザ・ガーデン (Vanpaia in za Gāden)
- Genre: Dark fantasy
- Created by: Wit Studio
- Original net animation
- Directed by: Ryōtarō Makihara
- Produced by: Hitoshi Itou
- Written by: Ryōtarō Makihara
- Music by: Yoshihiro Ike
- Studio: Wit Studio
- Licensed by: Netflix
- Released: May 16, 2022
- Runtime: 24–30 minutes
- Episodes: 5
- icon

Vampire in the Garden (Japanese: ヴァンパイア・イン・ザ・ガーデン, Hepburn: Vanpaia in za Gāden) is a Japanese original net animation (ONA) series produced by Wit Studio. Originally set for a 2021 premiere on Netflix, the series was delayed to May 16, 2022.

== Plot ==
Set in a world where humanity has lost a long war against vampires, they now survive in fortified cities protected by walls of light. Human society is poor, militarized, and hostile to vampire culture, including music and other forms of art. Momo, a young human soldier dissatisfied with this oppressive life, encounters Fine, the queen of the vampires, during an attack on the human city. Despite belonging to opposing sides, the two discover a shared desire to escape the conflict and a common love of music.

Momo and Fine leave their respective societies behind and set out in search of "Paradise", a legendary place where humans and vampires were once said to have lived together peacefully. Pursued by both humans and vampires, they travel through a ruined world shaped by war, prejudice, and failed attempts at coexistence.

== Characters ==
Momo (モモ)
Voiced by: Megumi Han (Japanese); Xanthe Huynh (English)
A human teenager and trainee soldier who struggles with the constant war between humans and vampires. Meeting the Queen of the Vampires on the battlefield she embarks on a journey where she learns to love life and experience music for the first time.
Fine (フィーネ, Fīne)
Voiced by: Yū Kobayashi (Japanese); Larissa Gallagher (English)
Queen of the Vampires who resists her role as Queen and wishes the war would end. Having lost the human love of her life, Aria, to the war she often wishes to die. Meeting a young human who resembles Aria she fosters her growing love for music and leaves the war behind as she learns to live again.
Allegro (アレグロ, Areguro)
Voiced by: Chiaki Kobayashi (Japanese); Paul Castro Jr. (English)
Fine's childhood friend and loyal servant. He despises humans as he knows a human was the cause of Fine's heartbreak and does everything he can to try make her happy and bring her home when she leaves.
Nobara (ノバラ)
Voiced by: Rika Fukami (Japanese); Lipica Shah (English)
Momo's mother and General of the human army. She has shown she loves Momo but prioritises her position as General over motherhood, even willing to charge Momo with treason to suit her political goals.
Kubo (クボ)
Voiced by: Hiroki Tōchi (Japanese); Connor Fogarty (English)
Nobara's brother and uncle to Momo. Also a General in the army he prefers fighting to politics and wields a katana in battle. His hatred of vampires runs deep as the woman he loved was turned into a vampire and he was forced to kill her. He is fond of Momo and criticises Nobara for being a bad mother to her.

== Production and release ==
The series was first announced back in March 2019 by Netflix, with Wit Studio handling the series' production. Ryōtarō Makihara served as director with assistance from Hiroyuki Tanaka. Tetsuyo Nishio designed the characters and Shunichiro Yoshihara served as art director for the series. Yoshihiro Ike served as the series' composer. Vampire in the Garden was released worldwide on May 16, 2022, on Netflix.

== Episodes ==
| No. | Title | Directed by | Written by | Original release date |
|---|---|---|---|---|
| 1 | "Episode 1" | Ryôtarô Makihara | Ryôtarô Makihara | May 16, 2022 |
Following a war against vampires the remnants of humanity reside in a city surrounded by a wall of light to keep out the vampires. Due to vampires' sensitive hearing, music and singing is banned. Young soldier Momo hesitates to kill a vampire child who hands her a music box. Momo's mother Nobara, General of the Army, is jubilant vampires have begun injecting a drug during battle that enhances their strength at the expense of quickly dying, suggesting they are growing desperate. Fine, Queen of the Vampires, frequently disregards her duties to attend lavish parties. In secret, she is ill from refusing to drink blood, and depressed. Nobara discovers the music box and flies into a rage, causing Momo to run away. The vampires attack the city to destroy the tower powering the lights. Fine witnesses Momo with the music box, begging to die to escape the world's misery. Momo's best friend Mirena is killed. Fine saves Momo and the two flee together. The vampires are forced to retreat when their attack fails.
| 2 | "Episode 2" | Hiroyuki Tanaka | Ryôtarô Makihara | May 16, 2022 |
Nobara sends her brother Kubo to find Momo. Hiding in her mansion Fine tries to introduce Momo to music but she is too upset over her friend's death. Momo finds a picture in the music box of a place called Eden, where vampires and humans enjoy music together. Fine's friend and servant Allegro is charged with bringing Fine back. Fine comforts Momo and explains that music is a way to express emotions. Kubo trades blood to starving vampires and learns of the castle. Momo thanks Fine for trying to save Mirena and asks her to help her sing. Kubo attacks the mansion at the same time the vampires arrive; a battle ensues and Fine saves Momo, escaping in her car and laughing together. With the mansion destroyed, Momo suggests they find Eden, though Fine is unsure it really exists.
| 3 | "Episode 3" | Ryôtarô Makihara | Ryôtarô Makihara | May 16, 2022 |
The two travel for days, listening to music and bonding. Nobaru is blamed for Momo betraying humanity. The pair enters a city where humans and vampires uneasily co-exist trading blood for gold. Fine becomes ill so Momo cuts herself to make her drink but Fine refuses. Momo risks asking the humans for blood, but is rejected so she steals it instead. Vampires invade the hotel, believing more humans must be inside. Allegro captures Momo, revealing Fine was once close to another human who betrayed her. Momo escapes with Fine as the vampires destroy the hotel and burn the music box. She forces Fine to recover by injecting blood into her veins and asks why Fine saved her if she was going to let herself die. Fine apologises. They travel by boat up the coast and pass out during a blizzard. Momo awakens in a bed next to a painting of the picture from the music box. A young vampire tells her she has reached Eden, an island off the coast.
| 4 | "Episode 4" | Ryôtarô Makihara | Ryôtarô Makihara | May 16, 2022 |
The vampire, Alicia, shows that there is electricity, farms, and the humans donate blood. A vampire suffering from blood addiction is confined in an old submarine, making Fine uneasy. Allegro points out that Fine only wants to relive her past with Aria. Nobara is ready to arrest her daughter or kill her, caring more about her own reputation. Fine leaves a note and her dagger for Momo, but the islanders hunt her down. Momo hides in the submarine, where the addict vampire reveals his healing power generates the island's electricity. Pictures like the one in the music box are traps, luring vampires to Eden to be used as batteries so the humans and vampires there can maintain the façade of co-existence. Alicia kills him and chases Momo. Kubo reaches the island and battle ensues. Momo drops a torpedo on Alicia, destroying the submarine. Momo begins to drown as Fine is locked in a prison.
| 5 | "Episode 5" | Ryôtarô Makihara | Ryôtarô Makihara | May 16, 2022 |
Fine dreams of losing Aria before escaping and saves Momo. They try to fly away together but Fine is shot and forces Momo to escape, promising to find Eden together, but when humans shoot her again she injects herself with the vampire drug. Momo is attacked by Allegro who is shot in the heart. Dying, he tells her to save Fine. Kubo duels Fine, turned into a monster by the drug. Momo tries to stop them, but Fine is beyond reason and savagely bites her. Overcome by memories of Aria and love for Momo, Fine lets Kubo live and flies away with Momo. Partially returning to normal, Fine tells Momo of Aria, who taught her to paint, dance and play music, but was later killed by humans. She apologies for treating Momo like a replacement for Aria as she has come to love Momo during their time together. Before dying, she asks Momo to mourn her with a song. Carrying her body down the mountain, Momo thanks Nobara for helping her discover the life she wants to lead, then walks away, ignoring her pleas for Momo to return. Years later, Momo has founded a real Eden for humans and vampires and teaches her children to sing and to dance.
