= Yūji Kishi =

Japanese actor and voice actor

- 岸 祐二
- Born: Tokyo, Japan
- Occupations: Actor; voice actor
- Years active: 1996–present
- Employer: CUBE Inc.
- Spouse: Mika Kikuchi (m. 2009; div. 2011)

Yūji Kishi (岸 祐二, Kishi Yūji) is a Japanese actor and voice actor. He had his acting debut in the 1996 Super Sentai series, Gekisou Sentai Carranger, as Kyosuke Jinnai/Red Racer Since then, he has become a very prominent voice actor in both anime and video games. He is most known as the main voice actor for Ken Masters in the Street Fighter series of video games produced by Capcom.

== Filmography ==
=== Film ===
- Mayonaka no Yaji-san Kita-san (God of Laughter) (voice)

=== Tokusatsu ===
- Gekisou Sentai Carranger (Kyōsuke Jinnai/Red Racer)
- Gekisou Sentai Carranger vs. Ohranger (Kyōsuke Jinnai/Red Racer)
- Denji Sentai Megaranger vs. Carranger (Kyōsuke Jinnai/Red Racer)
- Seijuu Sentai Gingaman (Shunsuke Kishimoto)
- Hyakujuu Sentai Gaoranger (Camera Org (ep. 3)) (voice)
- Ninpuu Sentai Hurricaneger (Kazuma Namekawa)
- Ninpuu Sentai Hurricanger vs. Gaoranger (Chubouzu) (Voice)
- Tokusou Sentai Dekaranger (Dragian Ganymede (ep. 49 - 50)) (voice)
- GoGo Sentai Boukenger (Wicked Dragon Tagargin (ep. 45)) (voice)
- Jyuken Sentai Gekiranger vs. Boukenger (Confrontation Beast-Hippopotamus Fist Baka) (Voice)
- Engine Sentai Go-onger (Savage Sky Barbaric Machine Beast Dumbbell Banki (ep. 46)) (voice)
- Kaizoku Sentai Gokaiger (Kyōsuke Jinnai (ep. 14))
- Shuriken Sentai Ninninger Vs. Kamen Rider Drive Spring Vacation Combining Special (Dr. D/Spider-Type Roidmude 089 (voice)/Youkai Buruburu (voice))
- Dogengers (Ohgaman (voice))
- Dogengers Nice Buddy (Ohgaman (voice))
- Dogengers High School (Ohgaman (voice))
- Dogengers Metropolis (Ohgaman (voice))
- Shin Dogengers (Ohgaman (voice))

=== Television animation ===
- Beast Wars II: Super Life-Form Transformers (Scuba(Squid), Drill Nuts(Weevil))
- Ghost in the Shell: Stand Alone Complex
- Hunter × Hunter (1999) (Kite, Gozu, Kastro, Pietro)
- Idaten Jump (Arthur the Biker Knight)
- I My Me! Strawberry Eggs! (Hibiki Amawa)
- Kochira Katsushika-ku Kameari Kōen-mae Hashutsujo (Saigō Volvo)
- Kyoshiro to Towa no Sora (Sōjirō)
- Les Misérables: Shōjo Cosette (Enjolras)
- Saikano (Kazu)
- X-Men: Evolution (Lance Alvers/Avalanche (Christopher Grey), Colossus (Michael Adamthwaite), Duncan Matthews (Vincent Gale))
- Yu-Gi-Oh! Duel Monsters (Tetsu Ushio)
- Yu-Gi-Oh! Duel Monsters GX (Freed the Brave Wanderer)

=== Original video animation (OVA) ===
- Final Fantasy VII Advent Children (Yazoo)
- Tsubasa: Reservoir Chronicle: Tokyo Revelation (Fuma)
- Tsubasa: Reservoir Chronicle: Spring Thunder (Fuma)

=== Video games ===
- Crash Bandicoot: The Wrath of Cortex (Crunch Bandicoot) (Kevin Michael Richardson)
- Crash Nitro Kart (Crunch Bandicoot) (Kevin Michael Richardson)
- JoJo's Bizarre Adventure (N'Doul)
- GioGio's Bizarre Adventure (Polpo), (Formaggio)
- SNK vs. Capcom series (Ken - not SVC Chaos: SNK vs. Capcom)
- Street Fighter III 3rd Strike: Fight for the Future (Ken Masters)
- Suikoden IV (Ramada, Count Fingāfūto)
- Tales of Symphonia: Dawn of the New World (Hawk)
- Ys I & II (Darm)
- Street Fighter IV (Ken Masters)
- Super Street Fighter IV (Ken Masters)
- Super Street Fighter IV: 3D Edition (Ken Masters)
- Street Fighter X Tekken (Ken Masters)
- Ultra Street Fighter IV (Ken Masters)
- Street Fighter V (Ken Masters)
- Ultra Street Fighter II: The Final Challengers (Ken Masters)
- Project X Zone (Ken Masters)
- Project X Zone 2 (Ken Masters)
- Super Smash Bros. Ultimate (Ken Masters, Mii Fighter Type 1)
- Street Fighter 6 (Ken Masters)
- Fatal Fury: City of the Wolves (Ken Masters)

=== Drama CDs ===
- Denkou Sekka Boys (Kyouichirou Yasaka)

=== Dubbing ===
==== Live-action ====
- Jack Reacher (Charlie (Jai Courtney))
- Mary Poppins Returns (Jack (Lin-Manuel Miranda))
- Power Rangers Turbo (Theodore Jay Jarvis Johnson (Selwyn Ward))
- Power Rangers in Space (Theodore Jay Jarvis Johnson (Selwyn Ward), Dark Specter (Christopher Cho), Black Alien Ranger)
- Power Rangers Lost Galaxy (Theodore Jay Jarvis Johnson, Ironite)
- The Sound of Music (50th Anniversary edition) (Rolfe (Daniel Truhitte))
- Torque (Cary Ford (Martin Henderson))
- Wonka (Arthur Slugworth (Paterson Joseph))

==== Animation ====
- Wreck-It Ralph (Ken Masters) (Reuben Langdon)

=== Theatre ===
- Les Misérables - Ensemble, Brujon (2003-2006), Enjolras (2005–2007), Javert (2015-2017)
- Miss Saigon - Ensemble, Schultz (2004), John (2008-2009)
- The Secret Garden - Mr. Craven (2005)
- Rudolf - Emperor Wilhelm II (2008)
- Sunday in the Park with George - Soldier (2009)
- Rock'n Jam Musical (2009)
- Elisabeth - Elmer (2010-2012)
- The Three Musketeers - Portos (2011)
- Legend of the Galactic Heroes - Stefan Neumann (2011), Ulrich Kesler (2012), Gregor Von Kulmbach (2013)
- Bonnie & Clyde - Frank Hamer (2012)
- Next to Normal - Dan (2013)
- The Count of Monte Cristo - Jacopo (2013)
- Vincent Van Gogh - Theo (2016)
- Little Shop of Horrors - Mr. Mushnik (2020)
- Merrily We Roll Along - Terry (2021)
- Charlie and the Chocolate Factory - Mr. Salt (2023-2026)
- The Producers – Franz Liebkind (2024)
- Musical Fate/Zero: The Sword of Promised Victory – Rider (2025)
- Everybody's Talking About Jamie – Jamie's Dad (Wayne New)/Sandra Bollock (2025)
