= Mare (TV series) =

- Promotional poster
- Genre: Drama
- Written by: Eriko Shinozaki
- Directed by: Kazuki Watanabe; Masae Ichiki; Takegorō Nishimura; Tsuyoshi Kawakami; Naoki Murahashi; Keita Hosaka
- Starring: Tao Tsuchiya; Yō Ōizumi; Takako Tokiwa; Shono Hayama; Kento Yamazaki; Fumika Shimizu; Mugi Kadowaki; Yuta Takahata; Daichi Watanabe; Eisuke Sasai; Sawa Suzuki; Muga Tsukaji; Eri Fuse; Guts Ishimatsu; Shoko Nakagawa; Yūya Yagira; Atsuo Nakamura; Fumiyo Kohinata; Min Tanaka; Yūko Tanaka
- Narrated by: Keiko Toda
- Composer: Hiroyuki Sawano
- Country of origin: Japan
- Original language: Japanese
- No. of episodes: 156

Production
- Executive producer: Ren Takahashi
- Producer: Tomoki Hase
- Production location: Japan
- Running time: 15 minutes
- Production company: NHK

Original release
- Network: NHK
- Release: March 30 – September 26, 2015

Mare (Japanese: まれ) is a Japanese television drama series, the 92nd Asadora (morning drama) that was broadcast daily on NHK from March 30, 2015, until September 26, 2015, the same as 2009's Asadora series Tsubasa. It is about a young woman from the Noto Peninsula who wants to become a patissier. Tao Tsuchiya, who appeared in the Asadora Hanako to Anne, was cast in the lead role after an audition of 2,020 women.

== Plot ==
At age ten, Mare Tsumura has decided she has no need for big dreams—she will just live her life step by step, day by day. Her father Tōru has had nothing but big dreams, each of which has ended in failure, causing their family to flee their debts in Tokyo by escaping to a small seaside town in the Noto Peninsula. They are not welcome at first, especially as Tōru keeps on messing things up, but the family finally finds a place to live at the Okesaku's (Fumi and her husband Ganji, who produces salt from seawater), and Mare makes friends with the kids her age. By the time Mare is 17, Tōru has long since disappeared. Mare is a great helper, but is set on living a safe life by working at city hall. She runs into Keita, a boy whom she helped when she first arrived in Noto but who moved away, and grows to like him. But when he confesses his love for her, she reacts badly to his declaration that he will become the world's best lacquerware artist. She cannot handle such big dreams. Toru eventually returns to Noto and is forgiven by his wife Aiko. Mare recalls her childhood memory of eating a delicious birthday cake and wanting to become a pastry chef, and after hearing her friend Ichiko's plans to become an idol, decides to give it one last try by entering a cake contest. She fails miserably, and is roundly criticized by the expert judge. Resolving to give up her dream, she tries to confess her feelings for Keita, only to find out he's now going out with Ichiko. Mare starts working at city hall, with Keita's father as her section chief. Her job is to help people thinking to move to Noto, but runs into many problems, including an agent who secretly steals information about lacquerware and gets Keita into trouble. Mare's family is also in trouble when the Okesaku's son suddenly returns to declare he wants to take over the place and start a cafe. He withdraws, however, when it is clear that the Tsumuras are as much family to his parents as he is. Things change for Mare when Aiko's mother suddenly appears for the first time since Aiko's marriage. Aiko resents her, thinking she abandoned her in order to become a famous patissier in France. Mare helps mend their relationship and finally decides to herself become a patissier under pressure from her grandmother.

Mare leaves for Yokohama to train at the pastry shop that made the cake she liked as a child. She is accepted, but then quits when she finds the cake does not taste like it used to. She walks around testing the cakes of many shops, but when she stops by the Chinese restaurant where her old schoolmate Takashi works while trying to become a musician, she tastes the cake she remembers. It is a product of Ma Chèrie Chou Chou, a shop run by acerbic chef Daigo Ikehata, who constantly closes the shop when things go wrong—the chef who happened to be the expert judge who bawled out Mare. Even though she has no experience, Mare convinces him to take her on for a test period of one month. She beds in the dorm where the other employees—Kazuya and Tōko—stay, which happens to be above the Chinese restaurant, and which happens to be run by Daigo's eccentric wife Rinko. Her first night there she is even kissed by Daigo's carefree—but drunk—son Daisuke. Trouble arrives when Daigo's special Christmas cake recipe is stolen and he again closes the shop. When Mare suggests she and the staff help think of a new recipe—an insult to the elite chef—Daigo challenges them to do that or get fired. Mare thinks up a recipe that uses Noto ingredients—including Genji's salt) and lets Kazuya present it, since it turns out he was the one to lose the recipe. Daigo hates the cake but is intrigued enough by the ingredients to create a new cake for Christmas. Instead of praising Mare, however, he fires her since a real chef never shares a recipe.

== Cast ==
- Tao Tsuchiya as Mare Tsumura
- Yō Ōizumi as Tōru Tsumura, Mare's father
- Takako Tokiwa as Aiko Tsumura, Mare's mother
- Shōno Hayama as Ittetsu Tsumura, Mare's brother
- Min Tanaka as Kanji Okesaku
- Yūko Tanaka as Fumi Okesaku, his wife
- Atsuo Nakamura as Yatarō Kontani, a lacquerware craftsman
- Itsuji Itao as Hiroyuki Kontani, Yataro's son and a public servant
- Kento Yamazaki as Keita Kontani, Hiroyuki's son and Mare's classmate and Mare's Husband
- Eisuke Sasai as Kōichi Kuramoto, a hairdresser
- Sawa Suzuki as Hana Kuramoto, his wife
- Shoko Nakagawa as Maki Obara
- Fumika Shimizu as Ichiko Kuramoto, their daughter and Mare's classmate
- Guts Ishimatsu as Shin'ichirō Kado, a fisherman
- Yuta Takahata as Yōichiro Kado, his son and Mare's classmate
- Muga Tsukaji as Makoto Teraoka, a postman
- Eri Fuse as Kumi Teraoka, his wife
- Seiji Rokkaku as Anzai
- Mugi Kadowaki as Minori Teraoka, their daughter and Mare's classmate
- Daichi Watanabe as Takashi Futaki, Mare's classmate
- Fumiyo Kohinata as Daigo Ikehata, an expert patissier
- Ryō as Rinko Ikehata, a Chinese restaurateur
- Yūya Yagira as Daisuke Ikehata, their son
- Yurika Nakamura as Minami Ikehata, their daughter
- Kaoru Mitsumune as Yukari Adachi
- Mitsuko Kusabue as Yukie Robert, Mare's grandmother
- Hikari Kajiwara as Ami Okano
- Marie Iitoyo as Saya Sawa
- Eiichiro Funakoshi as Ryoji Sakakibara
- Hiroyuki Ikeuchi as Tetsuya Okesaku

Preceded by Massan	Asadora; March 30 – September 26, 2015	Succeeded by Asa ga Kita
