= List of 2010 box office number-one films in Japan =

This is a list of films which have placed number one at the weekend box office in Japan during 2010.

== Number-one films ==
†	This implies the highest-grossing movie of the year.

#	Weekend End Date	Film	Total Weekend Gross	Notes
1	January 3, 2010	Avatar †	$22,578,763	
2	January 10, 2010	Avatar †	$18,483,523	
3	January 17, 2010	Avatar †	$15,526,919	
4	January 24, 2010	Avatar †	$15,526,919	
5	January 31, 2010	Avatar †	$24,581,011	
6	February 7, 2010	Avatar †	$19,354,539	
7	February 14, 2010	Avatar †	$15,983,401	
8	February 21, 2010	Avatar †	$13,385,515	
9	February 28, 2010	Avatar †	$15,031,164	
10	March 7, 2010	Doraemon: Nobita's Great Battle of the Mermaid King	$21,491,044	
11	March 14, 2010	Doraemon: Nobita's Great Battle of the Mermaid King	$18,445,460	
12	March 21, 2010	Doraemon: Nobita's Great Battle of the Mermaid King	$19,267,868	
13	March 28, 2010	Doraemon: Nobita's Great Battle of the Mermaid King	$14,058,962	
14	April 4, 2010	Doraemon: Nobita's Great Battle of the Mermaid King	$10,423,006	
15	April 11, 2010	Shutter Island	$12,150,809	
16	April 18, 2010	Alice in Wonderland	$34,685,116 (record)	
17	April 25, 2010	Alice in Wonderland	$28,514,397	
18	May 2, 2010	Alice in Wonderland	$28,709,572	
19	May 9, 2010	Alice in Wonderland	$16,513,221	
20	May 16, 2010	Alice in Wonderland	$14,475,761	
21	May 23, 2010	Alice in Wonderland	$15,267,082	
22	May 30, 2010	Alice in Wonderland	$12,613,371	
23	June 6, 2010	Confessions	$14,859,492	
24	June 13, 2010	Confessions	$15,144,096	
25	June 20, 2010	Confessions	$13,503,030	
26	June 27, 2010	Confessions	$10,615,272	
27	July 4, 2010	Bayside Shakedown 3	$18,667,579	
28	July 11, 2010	Toy Story 3	$34,093,200	
29	July 18, 2010	Arrietty	$34,468,819	
30	July 25, 2010	Inception	$30,466,988	
31	August 1, 2010	Toy Story 3	$31,983,602	
32	August 8, 2010	Toy Story 3	$25,293,164	
33	August 15, 2010	Toy Story 3	$31,831,901	
34	August 22, 2010	Hanamizuki	$23,602,987	
35	August 29, 2010	Hanamizuki	$19,638,309	
36	September 5, 2010	BECK	$15,250,832	
37	September 12, 2010	Resident Evil: Afterlife	$20,987,849	
38	September 19, 2010	Umizaru 3: The Last Message	$29,538,112	
39	September 26, 2010	Umizaru 3: The Last Message	$22,104,048	
40	October 3, 2010	Umizaru 3: The Last Message	$21,997,989	
41	October 10, 2010	Umizaru 3: The Last Message	$23,864,912	
42	October 17, 2010	Umizaru 3: The Last Message	$17,289,063	
43	October 24, 2010	Umizaru 3: The Last Message	$14,008,054	
44	October 31, 2010	SP: The Motion Picture	$21,272,254	
45	November 7, 2010	SP: The Motion Picture	$14,040,732	
46	November 14, 2010	SP: The Motion Picture	$12,235,076	
47	November 21, 2010	Harry Potter and the Deathly Hallows – Part 1	$18,923,902	
48	November 28, 2010	Harry Potter and the Deathly Hallows – Part 1	$12,956,754	
49	December 5, 2010	Space Battleship Yamato	$18,787,327	
50	December 12, 2010	Space Battleship Yamato	$17,120,192	
51	December 19, 2010	Kamen Rider × Kamen Rider × Kamen Rider The Movie: Cho-Den-O Trilogy	$21,274,090	
52	December 26, 2010	AIBOU: The Movie II	$16,430,985	

== Highest-grossing films ==
International film Japanese film

Highest-grossing films of 2010
Rank	Title	Gross
1	Avatar	¥15.60 billion ($177.72 million)
2	Alice in Wonderland	¥11.80 billion ($134.43 million)
3	Toy Story 3	¥10.80 billion ($123.04 million)
4	Arrietty	¥9.25 billion ($105.38 million)
5	Umizaru 3: The Last Message	¥8.04 billion ($91.59 million)
6	Bayside Shakedown 3	¥7.31 billion ($83.28 million)
7	Up	¥5.00 billion ($56.96 million)
8	One Piece Film: Strong World	¥4.80 billion ($54.68 million)
9	Resident Evil: Afterlife	¥4.70 billion ($53.54 million)
10	Pokémon: Zoroark: Master of Illusions	¥4.16 billion ($47.39 million)

== See also ==
- List of Japanese films of 2010
