= Junna (singer) =

Japanese pop singer

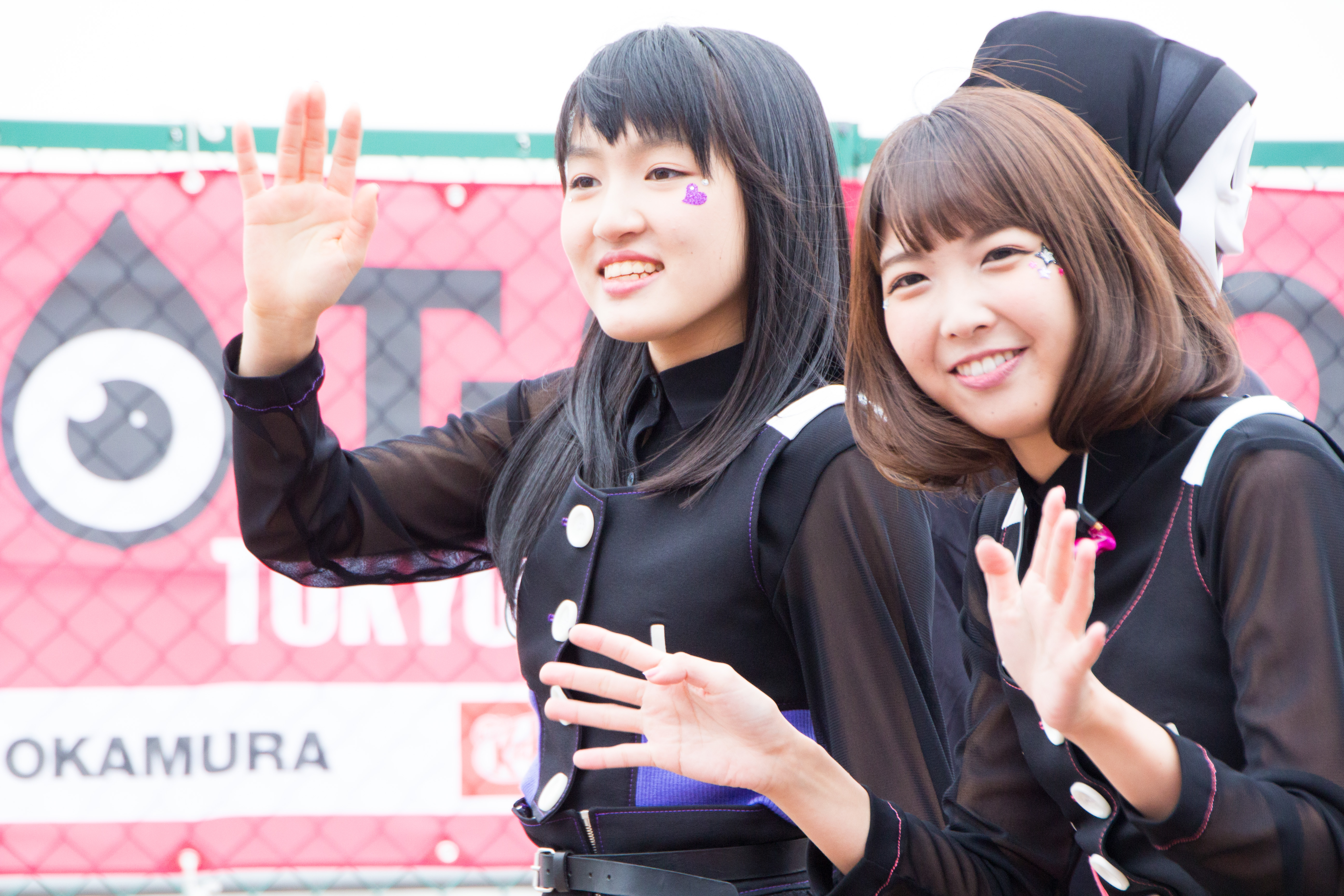
- Junna and Nozomi Nishida in 2016

Background information
- Born: 境 純菜 (Sakai Junna); November 2, 2000 (age 25); Aichi Prefecture, Japan
- Genre: J-pop
- Occupation: Singer
- Years active: 2016–present
- Labels: FlyingDog; SME
- Website: junnarockyou.com

Junna Sakai (境 純菜 Sakai Junna, born November 2, 2000), better known by her stage name Junna (じゅんな), is a Japanese singer managed by Cube Inc. and currently signed to SME Records.

== Career ==
Junna made her singing career debut as the singing voice of Mikumo Guynemer, the lead vocalist of the group Walküre from the anime Macross Delta. She was only 14 years old when she performed in the unit's digital single "Ikenai Borderline" released at the end of December 2015, making her the youngest singer to debut in the anime franchise's 35-year history.

In March 2017, her solo debut was decided and she performed a live tour in Tokyo, Nagoya and Osaka. Her first mini album "Vai! Ya! Vai!" was released in June 2017.

In 2017, she performed "Here", the first opening theme song for the anime The Ancient Magus' Bride. The single for "Here" was released in November 2017.

In 2018, she performed a second live tour in Sendai, Tokyo, Osaka, and Nagoya. The tour was done to celebrate the release of her first single. During the tour, she also announced that a second single, which would include the ending theme song for the Lord of Vermilion anime, was to be released in July.

In 2019, she performed "Kono Yubi Tomare", a theme song for the second season anime of Kakegurui.

In 2021, she performed "Umi to Shinju", the opening theme song for the anime Fena: Pirate Princess.

In 2022, she performed "Kaze no Oto Sae Kikoenai", used as the opening theme to Sabikui Bisco. The following year, she sang "Dear", which was used as the opening theme to the second season of The Ancient Magus Bride.

In 2024, she graduated from International Christian University.

In 2026, Junna announced that she had signed with Sony Music Labels imprint SME Records. Her first digital single under the new label, "Gum", was released on April 24 that same year.

On June 17, 2026, Junna was announced as one of the 35 musical contributors to anime studio CloverWorks' upcoming omnibus film Grotesqqque.

== Discography ==
=== Albums ===
List of studio albums, with selected chart positions
Title	Album details	Peak chart positions	
Title	Album details	JPN	JPN Comb.
17 Sai ga Utsukushi Nante, Dare ga Itta (17才が美しいなんて、誰が言った。)	Released: October 31, 2018; Label: FlyingDog; Format: CD, digital download, streaming	12	—
20x20	Released: December 9, 2020; Label: FlyingDog; Format: CD, digital download, streaming	33	43
Dear	Released: April 12, 2023; Label: FlyingDog; Format: CD, digital download, streaming	20	34
"—" denotes items that did not chart.

=== Extended plays ===
List of extended plays, with selected chart positions
Title	Album details	Peak chart positions
Title	Album details	JPN
Vai! Ha! Vai!	Released: October 31, 2018; Label: FlyingDog; Format: CD, digital download, streaming	21
Hello Goodbye	Released: June 24, 2026; Label: SME; Format: CD, digital download, streaming	23

=== Singles ===
List of singles, showing year released, selected chart positions, and album name
Title	Year	Peak chart positions		Album
Title	Year	JPN	JPN Comb.	Album
"Here"	2017	14	—	17 Sai ga Utsukushi Nante, Dare ga Itta
"Akaku Zetsubou no Hana"	2018	34	—	17 Sai ga Utsukushi Nante, Dare ga Itta
"Kono Yubi Tomare"	2019	29	32	20x20
"Iru Imi"	2019	41	—	20x20
"Ima"	2020	—	—	Non-album singles
"Hajimari no Uta"	2021	—	—	Non-album singles
"The Sea and a Peral"	2021	17	—	Dear
"The Route of the Sun"	2021	—	—	Dear
"Kaze no Otosae Kikoenai"	2022	29	—	Dear
"Aimai na Futari"	2022	—	—	Dear
"Nemurasareta Lineage"	2023	29	—	Non-album single
"Gum"	2026	—	—	Hello Goodbye
"Hello Goodbye"	2026	—	—	Hello Goodbye
"—" denotes items that did not chart or items that were ineligible to chart because no physical edition was released.

=== As Walküre ===
==== Digital singles ====
- [2015.12.31] Ikenai Borderline (いけないボーダーライン)
- [2016.03.01] Koi! Halation THE WAR (恋! ハレイション THE WAR)

==== Singles ====
- [2016.05.11] Ichido Dake no Koi Nara / Rune ga Pikatto Hikattara (一度だけの恋なら / ルンがピカッと光ったら)
- [2016.08.10] Zettai Reido θ Novatic / Hametsu no Junjou (絶対零度θノヴァティック / 破滅の純情)
- [2017.01.25] Walküre ga Tomaranai (ワルキューレがとまらない)
- [2018.02.14] Walküre ga Uragiranai (ワルキューレは裏切らない)

==== Studio albums ====
- [2016.07.06] Walküre Attack!
- [2016.09.28] Walküre Trap!
- [2021.10.13] Walküre Reborn!

==== Mini albums ====
- [2017.01.25] Walküre ga Tomaranai!

==== Live albums ====
- [2017.05.31] Walküre LIVE 2017 "Walküre ga Tomaranai" at Yokohama Arena (ワルキューレ LIVE 2017"ワルキューレがとまらない" at 横浜アリーナ)
