= Yuta Takahata =

Japanese actor and tarento (born 1993)

- 高畑 裕太
- Born: 13 September 1993 (age 33); Tokyo, Japan
- Education: Toho Gakuen College of Drama and Music
- Occupations: Actor; tarento
- Years active: 2012–16; 2019-present
- Agent: Free
- Style: television drama; stage
- Television: Mare
- Height: 1.81 m (5 ft 11 in)
- Parents: Ryosuke Otani (father); Atsuko Takahata (mother)
- Relatives: Kotomi Takahata (sister-in-law)

Yuta Takahata (高畑 裕太, Takahata Yūta; born 13 September 1993 in Tokyo) is a Japanese actor and tarento.

Takahata graduated from Toho Gakuen College of Drama and Music. He is the eldest son of actress Atsuko Takahata and actor Ryosuke Otani, and his sister-in-law is actress Kotomi Takahata. Takahata is also related to Keiko Kitagawa and Daigo.

== Biography ==
Takahata was a member of the baseball team at Gyosei International School. His position was catcher.

When he was in his third year of high school, he saw his mother, Atsuko, in the play A Streetcar Named Desire and was inspired to become an actor. He made his acting debut in the drama Akkoto Bokura ga Ikita Natsu in 2012. Later in April Takahata went to Toho Gakuen College of Drama and Music, the same college his mother graduated from, and studied theatre acting.

In 2015 he gained recognition when he appeared in the Asadora Mare. Takahata's reputation later increased as he appeared in a number of variety shows sometimes with his mother Atsuko.

On 23 August 2016 he was arrested by the Gunma Prefectural Police on charges of sexual assault against a female employee at a business hotel in Maebashi, where he stayed during movie shoot.

On 9 September 2016 at the Maebashi District Public Prosecutors Office, Takahata and the victim declared that the charges would be dropped. On the same day his manager, Mitsuzo Ishii Office, cancelled his contract, and he became independent.

On August 16, 2019, he continued his entertainment activities by appearing in the stage production of "Goodbye Nishiko-Kun".

== Filmography ==
=== TV drama ===
Year	Title	Role	Network	Notes	Ref.
2012	Akkoto Bokura ga Ikita Natsu	Osamu Sasaki	NHK		
2014	Tax Inspector Madogiwa Taro	Kazushi Kakimoto	TBS		
2015	The Eternal Zero	Okubo	TV Tokyo		
2015	Mare	Yoichiro Sumi	NHK		
2015	Anohana: The Flower We Saw That Day	Tetsudo "Poppo" Hisakawa	Fuji TV		
2016	Ōoku		Fuji TV		
2016	Budōkan	Haruki Maeda	Fuji TV, BS Sk-Per!		
2016	Tonari no Shinsengu	Hijikata Toshizō	Fuji TV		
2016	Noboru Tachibana Seishun Tebikae	Yasuke Shintani	NHK BS Premium		
2016	Aogeba Tōtoshi	Takeshi Jinnai	TBS		
2016	Otokomeshi	Shinya Yonekura	TV Tokyo	Episodes 1 to 5	

Unscheduled due to scandal

Year	Title	Role	Network	Ref.
2016	Mōmoku no Yoshinori Sensei: Hikari o Ushinatte Kokoro ga Mieta	Kyota Sasaki	NTV	
2016	Sanada Maru	Sanada Nobumasa	NHK	

=== Films ===
Year	Title	Role	Notes	Ref.
2015	Okāsan no Ki	Keiji Kajiya		
	Ao no Kaerimichi		(Note: Takahata's incident took place during the film's production.)	
2017	Nannichi Kunsairai			

Cancelled due to scandal

Year	Title	Role	Ref.
2016	L	Baker's husband	

=== Stage ===
Year	Title
2014	Onna 40-sai Nikuya no Musume

Canceled due to scandal

Year	Title	Ref.
2016	Sayōnaraba, iza	
2017	Theater Cocoon On Repertory 2017 Sekai	

=== Other TV programmes ===
Year	Title	Network	Notes	Ref.
2015	Peke Pon Plus	Fuji TV		
2016	Guruguru Ninety Nine	NTV	"Kanaboshi Sumou-bu" Regular	
2016	Go Taimen Variety: 7-ji ni aimashou	TBS	Regular	

Unscheduled due to scandal

Year	Title	Network	Ref.
2016	Konya kurabete mimashita	NTV	
2016	1 Shūkai tte Shiranai Hanashi	NTV	
2016	24-jikan TV: Ai wa Chikyū o Sukuu	NTV	

=== Narration ===
Year	Title	Network
2015	DHC Theater: Kono shima de, chiru koto ni shita. –Ten'nō no shima Pellyu to Anghaul–	Sky PerfecTV!

=== Music videos ===
Year	Title
2015	Typewriter & YMG "Let me Know feat. AK-69 and Kohh"

=== Advertisements ===
Year	Title	Ref.
2016	"Shin Seikatsu Ōen"	
