= AIBOU: Tokyo Detective Duo =

- The logo for Seasons 1-7
- Also known as: Partners
- Genre: detective fiction
- Starring: Yutaka Mizutani
- Opening theme: Rendez-Vu by Basement Jaxx (Pilots); Aibou Opening Theme by Yoshihiro Ike (Season 4-present)
- Ending theme: Promised You by Zard (Pilots)
- Composer: Yoshihiro Ike
- Country of origin: Japan
- Original language: Japanese
- No. of seasons: 24
- No. of episodes: 450

Production
- Production companies: TV Asahi; Toei Company

Original release
- Network: ANN (TV Asahi)
- Release: June 3, 2000 – present

AIBOU (相棒, Aibō; Partners) is a Japanese television detective series that first aired on TV Asahi on June 3, 2000. It has been adapted into six films: AIBOU: The Movie (2008), AIBOU: CSI Files (2009), AIBOU: The Movie II (2010), AIBOU: X-DAY (2013), AIBOU: The Movie III (2014) and AIBOU: The Movie IV (2017).

The drama features Ukyō Sugishita (杉下右京) , a police inspector assigned to the fictional Special Missions Unit (特命係, Tokumei-gakari) of the Tokyo Metropolitan Police Department and his partners as Kaoru Kameyama (亀山薫) from 2000 to 2009 and again from 2022 onward, Takeru Kambe (神戸尊) from 2009 to 2012, Tōru Kai (甲斐享) from 2012 to 2015, and Wataru Kaburagi (冠城亘) from 2015 to 2022. In Season 15 Episode 3, Roland appears as a host.

AIBOU is also broadcast with English subtitles in Hawaii by the television station KIKU under the name Partners, and in Los Angeles by the station Japan Hollywood Network (before UTB 18.1) under the official English name AIBOU: Tokyo Detective Duo.

== Seasons ==
Season	Episodes	Debut	Ending	Ukyo Sugishita	The Partner
Pre-Season	3	June 3, 2000	November 10, 2001	Yutaka Mizutani	Yasufumi Terawaki
1	12	October 9, 2002	December 25, 2002	Yutaka Mizutani	Yasufumi Terawaki
2	21	October 8, 2003	March 17, 2004	Yutaka Mizutani	Yasufumi Terawaki
3	19	October 13, 2004	March 23, 2005	Yutaka Mizutani	Yasufumi Terawaki
4	21	October 10, 2005	March 15, 2006	Yutaka Mizutani	Yasufumi Terawaki
5	20	October 11, 2006	March 13, 2007	Yutaka Mizutani	Yasufumi Terawaki
6	19	October 24, 2007	March 19, 2008	Yutaka Mizutani	Yasufumi Terawaki
7	19	October 22, 2008	March 18, 2009	Yutaka Mizutani	Yasufumi Terawaki
8	19	October 14, 2009	March 10, 2010	Yutaka Mizutani	Mitsuhiro Oikawa
9	18	October 20, 2010	March 9, 2011	Yutaka Mizutani	Mitsuhiro Oikawa
10	19	October 19, 2011	March 21, 2012	Yutaka Mizutani	Mitsuhiro Oikawa
11	19	October 10, 2012	March 20, 2013	Yutaka Mizutani	Hiroki Narimiya
12	19	October 16, 2013	March 19, 2014	Yutaka Mizutani	Hiroki Narimiya
13	19	October 15, 2014	March 18, 2015	Yutaka Mizutani	Hiroki Narimiya
14	20	October 14, 2015	March 16, 2016	Yutaka Mizutani	Takashi Sorimachi
15	18	October 12, 2016	March 22, 2017	Yutaka Mizutani	Takashi Sorimachi
16	20	October 18, 2017	March 14, 2018	Yutaka Mizutani	Takashi Sorimachi
17	20	October 17, 2018	March 20, 2019	Yutaka Mizutani	Takashi Sorimachi
18	20	October 9, 2019	March 18, 2020	Yutaka Mizutani	Takashi Sorimachi
19	20	October 14, 2020	March 17, 2021	Yutaka Mizutani	Takashi Sorimachi
20	20	October 13, 2021	March 23, 2022	Yutaka Mizutani	Takashi Sorimachi
21	21	October 12, 2022	March 15, 2023	Yutaka Mizutani	Yasufumi Terawaki
22	20	October 18, 2023	March 13, 2024	Yutaka Mizutani	Yasufumi Terawaki
23	19	October 16, 2024	March 12, 2025	Yutaka Mizutani	Yasufumi Terawaki
24	19	October 15, 2025	March 11, 2026	Yutaka Mizutani	Yasufumi Terawaki

== Films ==
- "AIBOU: The Movie" (2008) directed by Seiji Izumi
- "AIBOU: The Movie II" (2010) directed by Seiji Izumi
- "AIBOU: The Movie III" (2014) directed by Seiji Izumi
- "AIBOU: The Movie IV" (2017) directed by Hajime Hashimoto

=== Spin-off series ===
- "AIBOU Series: Yonezawa Mamoru no Jikenbo" (2009) directed by Yasuharu Hasebe, It stars Seiji Rokkaku.

== Cast ==
- Yutaka Mizutani as Ukyo Sugishita
- Yasufumi Terawaki as Kaoru Kameyama
- Mitsuhiro Oikawa as Takeru Kanbe
- Hiroki Narimiya as Toru Kai
- Takashi Sorimachi as Wataru Kaburagi
- Saya Takagi (Ikue Masudo) as Tamaki Miyabe
- Anju Suzuki as Sachiko Tsukimoto
- Yoko Moriguchi as Mari Koide
- Sawa Suzuki as Michiko Kameyama née Okudera
- Sei Matobu as Etsuko Usui
- Kazuhisa Kawahara as Kenichi Itami
- Atsushi Yamanishi as Rokuro Kakuta
- Kōji Ishizaka as Mineaki Kai
- Ryosuke Otani as Shinsuke Miura
- Ittoku Kishibe as Koken Onoda
- Yosuke Asari as Toshio Aoki
- Yukie Nakama as Miyako Yashiro
- Yukiko Shinohara as Reon Izumo
- Ryo Ono as Teruo Nakazono
- Satoshi Jinbo as Haruki Okochi
- Takaaki Enoki as Yahiko Kusakabe
- Ryuji Katagiri as Kanji Uchimura
- Seiji Rokkaku as Mamoru Yonezawa
- Takashi Yamanaka as Keiji Serizawa

== Video game ==
A Nintendo DS game called Aibou DS was published by Tecmo in March 5, 2009.
