= A Boy Called H =

- Poster
- Directed by: Yasuo Furuhata
- Written by: Ryota Kosawa; Kappa Senō
- Produced by: Takahiro Kishimoto; Motohiro Matsumoto; Hideaki Endo; Tomoo Ito
- Starring: Yutaka Mizutani; Ran Ito; Tatsuki Yoshioka
- Cinematography: Masahiro Aida
- Edited by: Hirohide Abe
- Music by: Yoshihiro Ike
- Production companies: Asahi Shimbun; Creek & River Co., Ltd.; GyaO; Hakuhodo DY Media Partners; Hokkaido Television Broadcasting; Kobe Shimbun; Kyushu Asahi Broadcasting; Kodansha; Nagoya Broadcasting Network; TV Asahi; Toho; Trysome
- Distributed by: Toho
- Release date: August 10, 2013 (Japan)
- Running time: 122 minutes
- Country: Japan
- Language: Japanese
- Box office: US$15.3 million (Japan)

A Boy Called H (Japanese: 少年Ｈ) is a 2013 Japanese war drama film directed by Yasuo Furuhata. It is based on the book by Kappa Senoh, translated into English by John Bester.

== Cast ==
- Yutaka Mizutani
- Ran Ito
- Tatsuki Yoshioka

== Reception ==
=== Box office ===
The film grossed US$15.3 million in Japan.

=== Accolades ===
It was chosen as the 7th best Japanese film of 2013 by the film magazine Eiga Geijutsu.

Award	Date	Category	Recipients and nominees	Result
Japan Academy Prize	7 March 2014	Best Film	A Boy Called H	Nominated
Japan Academy Prize	7 March 2014	Best Art	中澤克巳	Nominated
Japan Academy Prize	7 March 2014	Best Newcomer	Tatsuki Yoshioka	Nominated
