= Yoshihiro Ike =

Japanese musical artist (born 1963)

Yoshihiro Ike 池 頼広
- Born: August 25, 1963 (age 63); Kanagawa Prefecture, Japan
- Genres: Anime, drama, incidental music
- Occupations: Composer, arranger, bassist
- Years active: 1985–present
- Website: www.ike-yoshihiro.com

Yoshihiro Ike (池 頼広, Ike Yoshihiro; born August 25, 1963) is a Japanese composer, music arranger, and bassist. He is best known for scoring and composing music for film, TV dramas, anime and video games. He has worked on over 100 titles in the last 20 years. His most recognized composing works are AIBOU: Tokyo Detective Duo series (2002–present), Kamichu! (2005), Kaseifu no Mita (2011), Tiger & Bunny (2011), Saint Seiya: Legend of Sanctuary (2014), Inuyashiki (2017), B: The Beginning (2018), and Dororo (2019).

His score for the anime film, Blood: The Last Vampire, was nominated for the 2000 UK Music Awards under the soundtrack category, and subsequently awarded the top prize at the Japan Media Arts Festival in 2001 by the Agency for Cultural affairs.

On May 17, 2019, Anime Expo announced Yoshihiro Ike will be holding an orchestral concert at Anime Expo 2019. Ike's collection of anime soundtracks from Tiger & Bunny, Saint Seiya, B: The Beginning, and Dororo as well as his works on game soundtracks from Rage of Bahamut: Genesis and Shadowverse will be performed in his first international concert with over 50 of musicians from Los Angeles and Nashville, along with a special performance by a koto harpist and a shakuhachi flutist from Japan.

== Biography ==
In 1985, he formed the group AIKE BAND, and they released their debut album, 'In the First Sense' in 1987.

In 1988, he joined David T. Walker's solo album Ahimsa as a bassist in Los Angeles.

In 2000, his score for Blood: The Last Vampire was nominated for the 2000 UK Music Awards under the soundtrack category.

In 2001, Blood: The Last Vampire was awarded the top prize at the Japan Media Arts Festival in 2001 by the Agency for Cultural affairs.

In 2006, Kamichu! received an Excellence Prize at the 2005 Japan Media Arts Festival.

In 2007, he released his 20-year compilation album "Yoshihiro the BEST - 20th Anniversary Selection" which includes his iconic tracks from 40 different films.

In 2007, Japanese animation commercial for Kao Corporation "ASIENCE ~Kami wa Onna no Inochi" where Ike was in charge of the music received a Gold Winner Prize in Television/Chinema section at London International Awards.

In 2008, K-tai Investigator 7 was nominated in Kids&Young section at Japan Media Arts Festival.

In 2012, Ike won the 35th Japan Academy Film Prize for Outstanding Achievement in Music Award for his work on The Detective Is in the Bar.

In 2016, Ike released his 10-year compilation album "Yoshihiro Ike Works 2006-2016" including 51 tracks of his music from movies, television series, and Japanese animation from 2006 to 2016.

In 2023, Ike won the 46th Japan Academy Film Prize for Outstanding Achievement in Music Award for his work on Anime Supremacy! (film).

== Discography ==
=== Compilation albums ===
| Title | Year |
|---|---|
| Yoshihiro the BEST - 20th Anniversary Selection | 2007 |
| Yoshihiro Ike Works 2006-2016 | 2016 |

=== TV works ===
| TV Show | Year |
|---|---|
| Ring | 1995 |
| Gensou Midnight | 1997 |
| Kyoto Meikyuu Annai | 1999-2003 |
| Maiko-san wa Meitantei! | 1999 |
| Rinjin wa Hisaka ni Warau | 1999 |
| G-Saviour | 2000 |
| Tengoku ni Ichiban Chikai Otoko | 2001 |
| Oyaji Tantei | 2001-2002 |
| AIBOU: Tokyo Detective Duo (Season 1) | 2002 |
| Shin: Kyoto Meikyuu Annai | 2003-2008 |
| AIBOU: Tokyo Detective Duo (Season 2) | 2003 |
| Igi Ari! | 2004 |
| Makeinu no Touboe | 2004 |
| Ichiban Taisetsu na Hito wa Dare Desu ka | 2004 |
| Last Present | 2004 |
| AIBOU: Tokyo Detective Duo (Season 3) | 2004 |
| The Queen's Classroom | 2005 |
| Nobuta wo Produce | 2005 |
| AIBOU: Tokyo Detective Duo (Season 4) | 2005 |
| Kuroi Bag no Onna | 2006 |
| Gal Circle | 2006 |
| Love of My Life (TV series) | 2006 |
| AIBOU: Tokyo Detective Duo (Season 5) | 2006 |
| Enka no Joou | 2007 |
| Juken no Kamisama | 2007 |
| Shinu kato Ommota | 2007 |
| AIBOU: Tokyo Detective Duo (Season 6) | 2007 |
| Saitou-san | 2008 |
| O sha sha no shan! | 2008 |
| K-tai Investigator 7 | 2008 |
| Gonzo: Densetsu no Keiji | 2008 |
| OL Nippon | 2008 |
| AIBOU: Tokyo Detective Duo (Season 7) | 2008 |
| Honjitsu mo Hare. Ijo Nashi | 2009 |
| GodHand Teru | 2009 |
| MW (TV series) | 2009 |
| Damashie Utamaro (TV series) | 2009 |
| Gyne Sanfujinka no Onna tachi | 2009 |
| AIBOU: Tokyo Detective Duo (Season 8) | 2009 |
| Magerarenai Onna | 2010 |
| 853~Keiji Kamo Shinsuke | 2010 |
| Gold (TV series) | 2010 |
| AIBOU: Tokyo Detective Duo (Season 9) | 2010 |
| Utsukushii Rinjin | 2011 |
| Rebound (TV series) | 2011 |
| Young Black Jack | 2011 |
| The Yellow Handkerchief (TV series) | 2011 |
| QP | 2011 |
| Kaseifu no Mita | 2011 |
| AIBOU: Tokyo Detective Duo (Season 10) | 2011 |
| O-PARTS | 2012 |
| Blackboard ~Jidai to Tatakatta Kyoushi tachi~ | 2012 |
| Toshidensetsu no Onna | 2012 |
| Cleopatra na Onna tachi | 2012 |
| Damashie Utamaro 2 (TV series) | 2012 |
| AIBOU: Tokyo Detective Duo (Season 11) | 2012 |
| Saki (TV series) | 2013 |
| A Chef of Nobunaga (Part 1) | 2013 |
| Mottomo Tōi Ginga | 2013 |
| Damashie Utamaro 3 (TV series) | 2013 |
| Saitou-san 2 | 2013 |
| Mizuki Shigeru no GeGeGe no Kaidan | 2013 |
| AIBOU: Tokyo Detective Duo (Season 12) | 2013 |
| Toshidensetsu no Onna 2 | 2013 |
| Tokyo Scarlet ~Keishicho NS Kakari | 2014 |
| A Chef of Nobunaga (Part 2) | 2014 |
| Time Spiral | 2014 |
| AIBOU: Tokyo Detective Duo (Season 13) | 2014 |
| ○○tsuma | 2015 |
| Designer Baby - Hayami Keiji, Sankyu mae no Nanjiken - | 2015 |
| AIBOU: Tokyo Detective Duo (Season 14) | 2015 |
| Sumika Sumire 45sai Wakagaetta Onna | 2016 |
| The Girl Who Leapt Through Time (TV series) | 2016 |
| AIBOU: Tokyo Detective Duo (Season 15) | 2016 |
| Zenryoku Shissou | 2017 |
| AIBOU: Tokyo Detective Duo (Season 16) | 2017 |
| AIBOU: Tokyo Detective Duo (Season 17) | 2018 |
| Dai Zenryoku Shissou | 2019 |
| AIBOU: Tokyo Detective Duo (Season 18) | 2019 |
| AIBOU: Tokyo Detective Duo (Season 19) | 2020 |
| AIBOU: Tokyo Detective Duo (Season 20) | 2021 |
| AIBOU: Tokyo Detective Duo (Season 21) | 2022 |
| AIBOU: Tokyo Detective Duo (Season 22) | 2023 |

=== Anime works ===
| Anime Title | Year |
|---|---|
| Shin Megami Tensei: Tokyo Revelation | 1995 |
| Shinesman | 1996 |
| Sci-Fi Harry | 2000 |
| Sushiazarashi | 2000 |
| Sonic X | 2003 |
| Superior Defender Gundam Force | 2004 |
| OVAL×OVER | 2005 |
| Kamichu! | 2005 |
| Comic Party Revolution | 2005 |
| Ergo Proxy | 2006 |
| Flag | 2006 |
| Reideen | 2007 |
| Mokke | 2007 |
| Telepathy Shōjo Ran | 2008 |
| World Destruction: Sekai Bokumetsu no Rokunin | 2008 |
| Cobra the Animation | 2010 |
| Tiger & Bunny | 2011 |
| Kuroko's Basketball (Season 2) | 2013 |
| Super Seisyun Brothers | 2013 |
| Rage of Bahamut: Genesis | 2014 |
| Kuroko's Basketball (Season 3) | 2015 |
| Days | 2016 |
| The Great Passage | 2016 |
| Rage of Bahamut: Virgin Soul | 2017 |
| ROBOMASTERS THE ANIMATED SERIES | 2017 |
| Inuyashiki | 2017 |
| B: The Beginning | 2018 |
| Dororo | 2019 |
| To the Abandoned Sacred Beasts | 2019 |
| Knights of the Zodiac: Saint Seiya | 2019 |
| Shadowverse | 2020 |
| Knights of the Zodiac: Saint Seiya-Battle for Sanctuary | 2020 |
| B: The Beginning Succession | 2021 |
| Takt Op. Destiny | 2021 |
| Shadowverse Flame | 2022 |
| Tiger & Bunny 2 | 2022 |
| Vampire in the Garden | 2022 |
| Akiba Maid War | 2022 |
| Go! Go! Loser Ranger! | 2024 |

=== Movie works ===
| Film title | Year |
|---|---|
| Shinjuku Yokubou Tantei | 1994 |
| Spiral | 1998 |
| Blood: The Last Vampire | 2000 |
| Cold Scope | 2002 |
| Showa Kayō Daizenshu | 2003 |
| Dragon Head | 2003 |
| Dead Leaves | 2004 |
| Yokubou | 2005 |
| Full Circle | 2005 |
| Heavenly Forest | 2006 |
| Saikano | 2006 |
| X-Cross | 2007 |
| Speed Master | 2007 |
| Hannin ni Tsugu | 2007 |
| Eagle Talon The Movie - The Chancellor Only Lives Twice | 2007 |
| Secret Undercover Agent HONEY & BUNNY | 2007 |
| KIDS | 2008 |
| AIBOU: The Movie | 2008 |
| Secret Undercover Agent: Wildcats in Strip Royale | 2008 |
| Waiting for good news | 2009 |
| AIBOU: Kanshiki Yonezawa no Jikenbo | 2009 |
| MW (film) | 2009 |
| I give my first love to you | 2009 |
| Zebraman 2: Attack on Zebra City | 2010 |
| Welcome to the Space Show | 2010 |
| AIBOU: The Movie II | 2010 |
| Paradise Kiss (film) | 2011 |
| Ninja Kids!!! | 2011 |
| Detective in the Bar | 2011 |
| Home: Itoshi no Zashiki Warashi | 2012 |
| Tiger & Bunny: The Beginning | 2012 |
| Asura (2012 film) | 2012 |
| AIBOU: X Day | 2013 |
| Detective in the Bar 2 | 2013 |
| A Boy Called H | 2013 |
| Kiyoku Yawaku | 2013 |
| It All Began When I Met You | 2013 |
| Tiger & Bunny: The Rising | 2014 |
| AIBOU: The Movie III | 2014 |
| Saint Seiya: Legend of Sanctuary | 2014 |
| Gekijouban Yuuto kun ga iku | 2014 |
| Oh Brother, Oh Sister! | 2014 |
| The Empire of Corpses | 2015 |
| Harmony | 2015 |
| Yu-Gi-Oh!: The Dark Side of Dimensions | 2016 |
| Scanner: Kioku no Kakera wo Yomu Otoko | 2016 |
| Gantz: O | 2016 |
| Cyborg 009: Call of Justice | 2016 |
| Genocidal Organ | 2017 |
| AIBOU: The Movie IV | 2017 |
| Kuroko's Basketball The Movie: Last Game | 2017 |
| Detective in the Bar 3 | 2017 |
| Anime Supremacy! | 2022 |
| Knights of the Zodiac | 2023 |
| The Silent Service | 2023 |
| Muromachi Outsiders | 2025 |

=== Game works ===
| Game title | Year |
|---|---|
| Romance of the Three Kingdoms X | 2004 |
| Romance of the Three Kingdoms XI | 2006 |
| Disaster: Day of Crisis | 2008 |
| Trinity: Souls of Zill O’ll | 2010 |
| Shadowverse | 2016 |
