= Atsuko Takahata =

Japanese actress, voice actress and tarento

- 高畑 淳子
- Born: October 11, 1954 (age 72); Zentsūji, Kagawa Prefecture, Japan
- Occupations: Actress; voice actress; tarento
- Years active: 1976–present
- Relatives: Yuta Takahata (son); Kotomi Takahata (daughter)

Atsuko Takahata (高畑 淳子, Takahata Atsuko; born October 11, 1954) is a Japanese actress, voice actress, and tarento from Kagawa Prefecture, Japan.

She is married to actor Ryosuke Otani. They have a son, Yuta Takahata.

== Filmography ==
=== Drama ===
- Kyojuu Tokusou Juspion (1985), Space Witch Gilza
- Kamen Rider Black RX (1988), Maribaron
- Special Rescue Police Winspector (1990), Calra/Miyuki Fukano (Episode 27)
- Special Rescue Exceedraft (1992), Hidemi Takeuchi (Episode 6)
- Tokusou Robo Janperson (1993), Reiko Ayanokouji
- Kinpachi-sensei (1995), Kazumi Honda
- Mōri Motonari (1997), Hagi no Kata
- Doremisora (2002)
- The Great White Tower (2003), Masako Azuma
- 14-sai no Haha (2006), Haruko Matoba
- Atsuhime (2008), Honjuin
- Mother (2010), Toko Suzuhara
- Kyō wa Kaisha Yasumimasu. (2014), Mitsuyo Aoishi
- Dr.Rintarō (2015), Ruriko Aizawa
- Sanada Maru (2016), Kaoru
- Naomi and Kanako (2016), Akemi Ri
- Spring Has Come (2017)
- Black Leather Notebook (2017), Ichiko Nakaoka
- Natsuzora: Natsu's Sky (2019), Toyo
- Maiagare! (2022–23), Shōko Saitsu
- What Will You Do, Ieyasu? (2023), Ōmandokoro
- Asura (2025)

=== Film ===
- Ring Ø: Birthday (2000), Kaoru Arima
- Spring Snow (2005), H.R.H. Tohin-nomiya
- Yamato (2005), Tsune Tamaki
- Usagi Drop (2011), Yumiko Sugiyama
- Always: Sunset on Third Street '64 (2012), Natsuko
- Life in Overtime (2018)
- Out and Out (2018)
- The Dignified Death of Shizuo Yamanaka (2020), Tsuneko Yamanaka
- End-of-Life Concierge (2021), Chikako Ohara
- The Women (2021)
- Motherhood (2022)
- Baian the Assassin, M.D. (2023), Oseki
- Baian the Assassin, M.D. 2 (2023), Oseki
- The Moon (2023)
- The Ohara Family Rhapsody (2024), Chikako Ohara
- Amalock (2024)
- School Meals Time: Road to Ikameshi (2024), Saki
- School Meals Time: School Excursion Inferno (2025), Saki
- Purehearted (2025), Kamaru Iba
- Goodbye, My Loved Ones! (2026), Chikako Ohara

=== Anime ===
- Like the Clouds, Like the Wind (TV, 1990), Tamyūn
- Iczer Reborn (OVA, 1990), Neos Gold
- Magic Knight Rayearth (TV, 1994), Debonair
- X/1999 (Film, 1996), Kanoe
- Twilight of the Dark Master (OVA, 1998), Takamiya
- The Tale of the Princess Kaguya (Film, 2013), Sagami
- The Imaginary (Film, 2023), Downbeat Grandma

=== Dubbing roles ===
- Cold Creek Manor, Leah Tilson (Sharon Stone)
- Elizabeth, Queen Elizabeth I (Cate Blanchett)
- Elizabeth: The Golden Age, Queen Elizabeth I (Cate Blanchett)
- Masters of the Universe (1992 TV Asahi edition), Evil-Lyn (Meg Foster)
- Return of the Jedi, Mon Mothma (Caroline Blakiston)
- Stanley & Iris, Iris King (Jane Fonda)
- Superman IV: The Quest for Peace, Lacy Warfield (Mariel Hemingway)

== Honours ==
- Medal with Purple Ribbon (2014)
