= Kotomi Yamane =

Japanese shogi player (born 1998)

- Native name: 山根ことみ
- Born: March 9, 1998 (age 28)
- Hometown: Matsuyama, Ehime Prefecture

Career
- Achieved professional status: May 24, 2014 (aged 16)
- Badge number: W-49
- Rank: Women's 3-dan
- Teacher: Keizō Noda (6-dan)
- Tournaments won: 1

Websites
- JSA profile page

Kotomi Yamane (山根 ことみ, Yamane Kotomi; born March 9, 1998) is a Japanese women's shogi player ranked 3-dan.

== Women's shogi professional ==
Yamane defeated Manaka Inagawa to win the 5th Women's Professional Yamada Challenge Cup in August 2019 for her first shogi tournament championship.

Yamane's first appearance in a major title match came in May 2021 when she challenged Kana Satomi for 32nd Women's Ōi title (May–June 2021). Yamane lost the match 3 games to none.

=== Promotion history ===
Yamane's promotion history is as follows.

- 3-kyū: October 1, 2013
- 2-kyū: May 24, 2014
- 1-kyū: June 26, 2014
- 1-dan: April 1, 2015
- 2-dan: October 23, 2019
- 3-dan: November 24, 2023

Note: All ranks are women's professional ranks.

=== Major titles and other championships ===
Yamane has appeared in one major title match, but has yet to win a major title. Yamane has won one official non-title women's professional shogi tournament.

=== Awards and honors ===
Yamane won the Japan Shogi Association's Annual Shogi Award for "Excellent Women's Professional" for the 2020–2021 shogi year.

== Personal life ==
Yamane is married to shogi professional Kei Honda. The JSA officially announced the couple's marriage on its website on May 2, 2023, and stated that Yamane will continue to use her maiden name as a women's professional.
