= The Mass Missile =

- Origin: Tokyo, Japan
- Genres: Alternative rock
- Years active: 2000–present
- Labels: Small World Records, Sony Music
- Website: www.massmissile.com

The Mass Missile (ザ・マスミサイル) was formed in September 2000 in Tokyo. In 2002 the band released their first album, Kyōkasho, independently, and they made their first nationwide tour in Japan soon after. Following the success of their first album they released the mini album Nakama no uta via the Small World Records label in 2003.

In 2004 The Mass Missile signed with Sony Music and released their first album on a major label, Ningen de yokatta. The album's single, "Ima made nando mo" was chosen as the fifth ending theme of the popular anime series Naruto. The song reached #22 on the Oricon chart and remained on the chart for seven weeks.

On August 2, 2006, the band released their third album, Moyori no yume (最寄りの夢).

== Discography ==
=== Albums ===
- 2013 - Masuto (マスト)
- 2010 - Aitai aite (あいたいあいて)
- 2008 - Ningen dōzen
- 2006 - Moyori no yume (最寄りの夢)
- 2004 - Ningen de yokatta
- 2002 - Kyoukasho

=== EPs ===
- 2012 - HOPE#
- 2010 - Jerry
- 2010 - Mata au hi made 3
- 2008 - Arukimakuri
- 2003 - Nakama no uta

=== Singles ===
- 2013 - "Good Bye" (グッド・バイ)
- 2010 - "Yume to genjitsu no hazama ni kanpeki wa hitsuyō nai"
- 2009 - "Ikita akashi"
- 2008 - "Akiramecha" / "Mayoi nagara"
- 2005 - "Ima"
- 2005 - "Haikei"
- 2005 - "Kyōkasho"
- 2004 - "Kimi ga ite kurete yokatta"
- 2004 - "Ima made nando mo"
