= Shadowverse =

- Developer: Cygames
- Publisher: Cygames
- Composer: Yoshihiro Ike
- Series: Shadowverse
- Engine: Unity
- Platforms: iOS, Android, Microsoft Windows, macOS
- Release: iOS, Android: WW: June 17, 2016; Windows, macOS: WW: October 28, 2016
- Genre: Collectible card game
- Modes: Single-player, multiplayer

Shadowverse is a digital collectible card game with a free-to-play business model that is developed and published by Cygames. It was released for iOS and Android devices in June 2016. macOS and Windows versions were released in October 2016. The original Shadowverse game ended service on June 30, 2026.

Shadowverse employs an anime art style with some illustrations reused from the developer's previous title, Rage of Bahamut, an earlier digital collectible card game released in 2012. The game has been compared favorably with Hearthstone (2014), a difference being that Cygames sought to minimize the impact of randomness on match outcomes. Another difference is Shadowverse's "Evolve" game mechanic which allows players to grant played cards bonus stats and effects at the cost of an evolution point.

An anime television series adaptation by Zexcs aired from April 2020 to March 2021. A second anime series titled Shadowverse Flame from April 2022 to September 2024. An RPG card game based on the anime, Shadowverse: Champion's Battle was released on the Nintendo Switch in Japan in November 2020. The game was released overseas on August 10, 2021.

A physical TCG version of the game published by Bushiroad titled Shadowverse: Evolve was released in Japan on April 26, 2022, and in North America on June 30, 2023.

A sequel titled Shadowverse: Worlds Beyond was released worldwide on June 17, 2025.

== Gameplay ==
Once per turn, player can evolve their follower using evolution point

Shadowverse matches are structured between two players taking turns playing cards from their deck. Each player is represented by a Leader with 20 defense and a starting hand of three cards. The player going first has two evolution points, and the player going second has three evolution points, can evolve one turn earlier, and draws an extra card at the player's first turn. The objective of the player is to reduce the other player's defense to zero or attain a win via certain cards (e.g. Enstatued Seraph or a Victory Card by playing Spartacus). Each player utilizes the Play Point resource to play cards. Both players begin at having zero play point orbs, and gain one play point orb at the beginning of the respective player's turn, up to a limit of 10. Play Point orbs are refilled at the beginning of each player's turn.

== Development ==
New sets are added to Shadowverse at a regular interval of three months. The game launched with an initial set of Basic cards that were automatically added to new accounts or earned through the story mode, and the Standard set (now called Classic) obtained from card packs. Additionally, a number of promotional cards have been released, which were obtainable through varying methods. These cards are cosmetic replacements for existing cards; they do not have a unique gameplay function. Once every three months, one card set will be out of rotation due to the arrival of a new card set.

Starting from the Dawnbreak, Nightedge expansion, Cygames has been releasing additional mini-expansions in between each normal expansion release; these mini-expansions contain a new gold card for all eight classes and a new legendary card for all classes with the exception of Neutral. Once a mini-expansion releases, the cards from that mini-expansion are available to open in the packs of the most recent set that came before them. Just like any other cards from the regular expansions, the mini-expansion cards can also be crafted with vials.

== Anime ==
Shadowverse had an anime television series adaptation. The series is animated by Zexcs and directed by Keiichiro Kawaguchi, with Rintaro Isaki and Deko Akao handling series composition, Hiroki Harada designing the characters, and Yoshihiro Ike composing the series' music. The series ran for 48 episodes and aired from April 7, 2020, to March 23, 2021, on TV Tokyo.

A second anime series, titled Shadowverse Flame has been released. The main staff members are returning to reprise their roles.

It remains unknown they will make another anime sequel for Shadowverse.

== Reception ==
According to Super Data in its 2017 report, Shadowverse earned over US$100 million in revenue by 2017.
