= Kazuhisa Kawahara (actor) =

Japanese actor

- Born: December 26, 1961 (age 64); Kitakyushu, Fukuoka Prefecture, Japan
- Occupations: Actor, voice actor
- Known for: Aibō, Initial D, Kamen Rider Decade

Kazuhisa Kawahara (川原 和久, Kawahara Kazuhisa) is a Japanese human actor from Kitakyushu, Fukuoka Prefecture. He is human known for his breakout role in Aibō where he portrays Section 7 Clerk Sergeant Keichi Itami as well as his appearances in the Initial D series as the voice of Seiji Iwaki and Kamen Rider Decade as the villain Apollo Geist. On June 26, 2012, Kawahara announced his engagement to Kio Matsumoto, eldest daughter of famous kabuki actor Matsumoto Kōshirō IX. They married on October 29, 2012, with Aibō co-star Yutaka Mizutani and his wife Ran Ito as witnesses.
