= Kotomi Takahata (actress) =

Japanese actress (born 1986)

- 高畑 こと美
- Born: 22 November 1986 (age 39); Tokyo, Japan
- Occupation: Actress
- Years active: 2009—
- Notable work: Caucasus no Hakuboku no Wa; Awa; The Spider's Thread
- Height: 164 cm (5 ft 5 in)
- Mother: Atsuko Takahata
- Relatives: Yuta Takahata (brother-in-law)
- Website: Kotomi Takahata no blog..Futsu de ī no.

Kotomi Takahata (高畑 こと美, Takahata Kotomi; born 22 November 1986) is a Japanese actress from Tokyo who has featured in productions for theatre, television, film and radio. Her mother is Seinenza Theater Company actress Atsuko Takahata and her brother-in-law is actor Yuta Takahata. Keiko Kitagawa is her third distant cousin.

== Appearances ==
=== Stage ===
- Kamogawa Horumo (May – June 2009, Kichijoji Theater, etc.) as Arisa Miyoshi
- Suspender 7th Performance Yoru to Mori no Munichhausen (September 2009, Mitaka City Arts and Culture Center) as Saki
- tpt 73rd Performance Kirei Janakya Ikenai Wake (December 2009 – January 2010, Zamza Asagaya)
- OneOr8 24th Performance Zetsumetsu no Tori (September – October 2010, Theatre Tram)
- 44 Produce Futsū no Seikatsu (Oct 2010, Kinokuniya Hall)
- Habanera Produce Rosette (December 2010, Tokyo Metropolitan Theatre Small Hall 1) as Miharu
- Komatsu-za 93rd Performance Nihonjin no heso (March 2011, Theatre Cocoon)
- tpt 79th Performance Ō to Ko (September 2011, Ueno Storehouse)
- Edo-ito Ayatsuri Ningyō-za Performance Caucasus no Hakuboku no Wa (January 2012, Traditional Hall) as Gurusha
- KAAT Nippon Literature Miminashi Hōichi (April 2012, Kanagawa Arts Theatre)
- ACM Theater Produce Performance Cash On Delivery (June 2012, Art Tower Mito)
- Gekidan Tokyo Festival Awa (July 2012, Shimokitazawa Off Off Theater)
- Takaha Theater Company Sekai o Oeru tameno, Kaigi (January 2013, Shimokitazawa Station Front Theater)
- Chijinkai Shinsha 2nd Performance Nekko (April 2013, Akasaka RedTheater)
- Meiji-za August Performance Tomoe Gozen (August 2013, Meiji-za)
- 2014 Theater Green Produce Nomuzu Project Second Performance Doshinbo no Hama (June 2014, Theater Green Box in Box Theater)

=== Films ===
- The Spider's Thread (April 2013, Kaeru Cafe) as Oni
- Kaze yo Arashi yo (2024), Otake Kokichi

=== TV dramas ===
- Mother Episode 6 (May 2010, NTV)
- Getsuyō Golden Mitori no Isha: Bike Kāsan no Ōshin Nisshi (December 2011, TBS)
- Tonbi Second Part (January 2012, NHK) as Reception woman
- Suiyō Mystery 9 Kaigo Helper Murasakiame-ko no Jiken-bo (June 2012, TX) as Miyuki
- Taiga drama Gunshi Kanbei (January 2014, NHK) as Okiku
- Iyashi-ya Kiriko no Yakusoku (September 2015, THK) as Tamako/Lucy Tamaki
- Kaze yo Arashi yo (2022), Otake Kokichi

=== Radio ===
- Seishun Adventure "Maiwa Densetsu" (May – June 2011, NHK-FM)
