= Yutaka Mizutani =

Japanese actor and singer

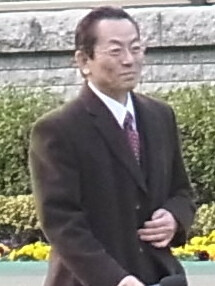
- 2014
- Born: July 14, 1952 (age 73); Ashibetsu, Hokkaidō, Japan
- Occupations: Actor, singer
- Years active: 1965–present
- Spouse: Ran Ito (m. 1989)
- Children: Shuri

Yutaka Mizutani (水谷 豊, Mizutani Yutaka) is a Japanese actor and singer. He was born on July 14, 1952, in Ashibetsu, Hokkaidō, Japan.

== Biography ==
Mizutani was raised from the age of eight in Tokyo, Japan. He started acting at the age of twelve, when a neighbor introduced him to a children's acting school in the area. When he discovered that going to an acting school wasn't the same as meeting the people he admired on TV, he wanted to quit, but by that time he had been selected to play a small role in a 'Vampire', a television movie being filmed by Fuji Television. This role launched his reluctant career, and though he purposely took a number of years off work to try studying, his failing to get into university urged him to continue in the acting business.

It was after the age of 20 when his career as an actor finally took off. His first major drama was in 1974, called Kizu Darake no Tenshi (Battered Angel).

At the moment Mizutani stars in a regular TV Asahi detective drama called Aibō (相棒) with actors Yasufumi Terawaki (2000-2008, 2022-), Mitsuhiro Oikawa (2009-2012), Hiroki Narimiya (2012-2015) and Takashi Sorimachi (2015-2022).

== Music ==
In addition to acting, his agency, "TRI-SUM", also encouraged him to put out music albums starting from 1977, all of which sold very well. His last album was released in 2009 (Time Traveler).

Mizutani is currently under the avex IO label of the Avex Group.

== Filmography ==
=== Film ===
- The Youth Killer (1976) – Jun Saiki
- Taiyō o Nusunda Otoko (1979) – A police officer
- Kofuku (1981) – Murakami
- A Boy Called H (2013) – Morio
- Aibou: The Movie III (2014) – Ukyō Sugishita
- Chateau de la Reine (2015) – Ukyō Kitashirakawa
- Tap The Last Show (2017) – Watari (also director)
- Leaving the Scene (2019) – Mitsuo Tokiyama (also director and writer)
- Sun and Bolero (2022) – Ken Tōdō (also director and writer)
- Piccola Felicità (2026) – Sotaro Sato (also director and writer)

=== Television ===
- Taiyō ni Hoero! (1972–74) – Mamoru (ep. 1), Jirō (ep. 30), Kyōichi (ep. 54) and Saburō (ep. 109)
- The Water Margin (1973),
- Shinsho Taikōki (1973), Akechi Hidemitsu
- Kizudarake no Tenshi (傷だらけの天使; 1974–1975) – Akira Inui
- Akai Gekiryū (赤い激流; 1977) – Toshio Tashiro
- Otokotachi no Tabiji (男たちの旅路; 1976-1982) - Yōhei Sugimoto (by ep. 1, 4th season)
- Netchu Jidai (1978–81) – Kōdai Kitano
- Tantei Monogatari (1979) – Ichirō Tamura (ep. 5)
- Kyotaro Nishimura Suspense -Susumu Samonji (1999–2013)
- AIBOU: Tokyo Detective Duo (2000–) – Ukyō Sugishita
- Izakaya Moheji (居酒屋もへじ; 2011–) – Heiji Yonemoto

=== Anime ===
- Doraemon (2018) – Ukyō Sugishita

== Personal relationships ==
Mizutani was once married to an American actress by the name of Miki MacKenzie in 1982. They divorced in 1986. He is now married to singer and actress Ran Itō from the 1970s Japanese idol trio Candies; they have one daughter. Their son-in-law is Ryoki from the group Be First.
