= Partners: The Movie III =

- Poster
- Directed by: Seiji Izumi
- Screenplay by: Yasuhiro Koshimizu
- Based on: AIBOU: Tokyo Detective Duo
- Starring: Yutaka Mizutani; Hiroki Narimiya; Tsuyoshi Ihara; Yumiko Shaku; Toru Kazama
- Music by: Yoshihiro Ike
- Production companies: TV Asahi; Toei Company; Trysome; Shogakukan; ABC; Nagoya TV; Kinoshita Group; Hokkaido Television Broadcasting; Hiroshima Home Television; Kyushu Asahi Broadcasting; TopCoat
- Distributed by: Toei Company, Ltd.
- Release date: April 26, 2014 (Japan)
- Running time: 114 minutes
- Country: Japan
- Language: Japanese
- Box office: US$19.8 million (Japan)

AIBOU: The Movie III (相棒 -劇場版III- 巨大密室！特命係 絶海の孤島へ, Aibō - Gekijō-ban III - Kyodai Misshitsu! Tokumei-gakari Zekkai no Kotō e; lit. BUDDY -Movie Version III- A Huge Closed Room! The Special Clerk Goes to an Oceanic Deserted Island), or Partners: The Movie III is a 2014 Japanese mystery suspense crime film directed by Seiji Izumi and based on the television series AIBOU: Tokyo Detective Duo.

== Cast ==
- Yutaka Mizutani
- Hiroki Narimiya
- Tsuyoshi Ihara
- Yumiko Shaku
- Toru Kazama

== Reception ==
The film grossed US$19.8 million in Japan.
