= Momiji (disambiguation) =

Momiji is the Japanese name for Acer palmatum, the Japanese maple tree.

Momiji may also refer to:

== People ==
- Momiji Nishiya (西矢 椛, born 2007), Japanese skateboarder
- Momiji Yamamura (山村 紅葉, born 1960), Japanese actress

== Characters ==
- Momiji (oni), an oni from Japanese mythology
- Momiji (Ninja Gaiden), a character in the Ninja Gaiden games
- Momiji Fujimiya, a character from the manga Blue Seed
- Momiji Fuyou, a character from the visual novel Shuffle!
- Momiji Inubashiri, a character in Mountain of Faith from the Touhou Project series
- Momiji Mochizuki, a character from New Game!
- Momiji Momi, a character from The 100 Girlfriends Who Really, Really, Really, Really, Really Love You
- Momiji Oouka, a character from Detective Conan
- Momiji Sohma, a character from the manga Fruits Basket
- Momiji, a character from the video game For Honor

== Other uses ==
- Momiji Dolls, a collection of dolls and accessories
- Momiji mark, a sign used on vehicles in Japan to indicate "aged person at the wheel"
- "Momiji", a traditional Japanese song by Teiichi Okano
- Leaf peeping or momijigari, leaf viewing
