= Hana Basu =

Japanese manga series

- Hana Basu: Kokeishi Hanae no Basuke Ron
- First tankōbon volume cover

ハナバス 苔石花江のバスケ論
- Genre: Sports
- Manga
- Written by: Kōhei Miyoshi
- Published by: Kodansha
- Imprint: Shōnen Magazine Comics
- Magazine: Magazine Pocket
- Original run: December 26, 2024 – present
- Volumes: 8

Hana Basu: Kokeishi Hanae no Basuke Ron (Japanese: ハナバス 苔石花江のバスケ論) is a Japanese manga series written and illustrated by Kōhei Miyoshi. It began serialization in Kodansha's Magazine Pocket service in December 2024, and has been compiled into eight volumes as of November 2026.

== Plot ==
Hanae Kokeishi, an animal lover who has just started her first year of high school, is invited by her classmate to try out for the basketball club. Hanae is initially hesitant as she has a loner personality, but decides to give it a try due to her desire to make friends in high school. After seeing her classmate Tsubomi Komidori be rejected by the basketball club, she challenges Karin Kurihara, a member of the team, to a match. Her skills impress the club, which leads to her and Tsubomi joining the team.

== Characters ==
Hanae Kokeishi (苔石 花江, Kokeishi Hanae)
A first-year high school student at Ōgawa High School, who plays as a point guard. She used to practice basketball with her twin sister Satsuki when they were in middle school, which allowed her to develop basketball skills. She has no friends and even sees other people as "primates", instead developing an interest in biology, particularly reptiles and insects. Due to her interests, she originally considered becoming a member of the biology club prior to joining the basketball team.
Satsuki Kokeishi (苔石 咲月, Kokeishi Satsuki)
Hanae's twin sister, who is currently studying at a high school in the Kansai region. She used to practice basketball with Hanae and was the ace of her junior high school team.
Tsubomi Komidori (小緑 つぼみ, Komidori Tsubomi)
Hanae's classmate and first friend. She was a member of the brass band in junior high school, but decided to take up basketball as she wanted to try something new. However, because she was a beginner, she was initially rejected by the team, only joining after Hanae won a one-on-one match against Kanae.
Karin Kurihara (栗原 夏凛, Kurihara Karin)
A first-year student and a shooting guard. She was her junior high school's ace and was teammates with Haru, but had a reputation for her intense training methods towards her teammates. She decided to enroll in Ōgawa to be with Enon. She is nicknamed Manon.
Haru Arima (有舞 春, Arima Haru)
A first-year student and a small forward, who was teammates with Karin in junior high school.
Hiyoko Hatori (羽鳥 ひよこ, Hatori Hiyoko)
A first-year student who plays as a center.
Enon Fuji (藤 咲音, Fuji Enon)
A second-year small forward and the team ace. She was impressed by Hanae's skills and recruited her to the team.
Kaori Inukai (犬養 香, Inukai Kaori)
A second-year point guard, who is nicknamed "Wanko" by others.
Ichigo Date (伊達 苺, Date Ichigo)
A second-year student, who is nicknamed "Berry" by others. She was previously a track-and-field athlete in junior high school.
Tamaki Ōnagi (大椛 環, Ōnagi Tamaki)
A third-year center. She is the team captain and the student council president of Ōgawa High School.
Mamori Mizugami (水神 まもり, Mizugami Mamori)
A third-year former point guard who currently serves as the team's manager and coach.
Yoshiko Iryū (井流 美子, Iryū Yoshiko)
A third-year power forward, who is currently on leave from the team to focus on her family's business.
Yukari Kazama (風間 ゆかり, Kazama Yukari)
An English teacher who serves as the team's advisor.

== Development ==
Kōhei Miyoshi was inspired to create Hana Basu due to wanting to write a manga about women's basketball, having been inspired by the success of Slam Dunk. He based the manga on his ideas of what he thought a series about women's basketball should be like. He based Hanae's personality on his own social awkwardness and interest in basketball, himself playing as a point guard but not being very good at the sport. He chose her surname Kokeishi due to his own difficulties in pronouncing his own name, with Kokeishi being a possible stuttered way of saying kokeshi. He watched basketball games in Tokyo and on YouTube as references for the series. Prior to the series beginning serialization, he originally created drafts for battle manga and draft manga, but they were ultimately rejected.

== Publication ==
The series is written and illustrated by Kōhei Miyoshi, who began serializing it in Kodansha's Magazine Pocket service on December 26, 2024. The first tankōbon volume was released on March 7, 2025; eight volumes have been released as of November 9, 2026.

No.	Release date	ISBN
1	March 7, 2025	978-4-06-538775-7
2	May 9, 2025	978-4-06-539452-6
3	August 7, 2025	978-4-06-540357-0
4	November 7, 2025	978-4-06-541538-2
5	February 9, 2026	978-4-06-542594-7
6	May 8, 2026	978-4-06-543605-9
7	August 7, 2026	978-4-06-544620-1
8	November 9, 2026	978-4-06-545708-5

== Reception ==
The series was nominated for the 2025 Next Manga Award in the Web Manga category.

Yuuki Honda, writing for Kai-You, praised the manga's writing, finding charms in the characters and seeing Hanae as a relatable character.
