= Gift (2026 Japanese TV series) =

2026 Japanese television drama series

- GIFT (ギフト)
- Genre: Sports drama
- Created by: Shunichi Hirano
- Written by: Tomoki Kanazawa
- Directed by: Shunichi Hirano; Naoki Kato; Hiroaki Ito
- Starring: Shinichi Tsutsumi; Yuki Yamada; Kasumi Arimura
- Music by: Yuki Hayashi
- Ending theme: "Stardust" by Official Hige Dandism
- Country of origin: Japan
- Original language: Japanese
- No. of episodes: 10

Production
- Producers: Masako Miyazaki; Yuki Uchikawa
- Running time: 54 minutes
- Production company: TBS Television

Original release
- Network: TBS
- Release: April 12 – June 14, 2026

Related
- SHIFT: Those Who Collide and Move Forward

GIFT (Japanese: ギフト) is a 2026 Japanese sports drama television series broadcast in the Sunday Theatre programming block on TBS from 12 April to 14 June 2026. The series stars Shinichi Tsutsumi as an eccentric astrophysicist who becomes involved with an underperforming wheelchair rugby team.

Created and conceived by director Shunichi Hirano and written by Tomoki Kanazawa, the original story uses wheelchair rugby as its central subject. The Japan Wheelchair Rugby Federation cooperated in the production and provided technical supervision.

== Premise ==
Fumito Gotetsu is a brilliant but socially abrasive associate professor of astrophysics who finds intellectual pleasure in solving difficult problems. Hitoka Kiriyama, an editor for the lifestyle magazine Yurugi, is assigned to report on wheelchair rugby and becomes acquainted with both an elite team and the struggling Blaze Bulls.

Gotetsu visits the Blaze Bulls, whose head coach is his cousin Masami Hino. After analysing the team's performance, he concludes that its greatest weakness is the absence of an overwhelming ace. His blunt assessment provokes player Ryo Miyashita, who challenges him. Gotetsu subsequently becomes an adviser to the team and applies his analytical methods to its sporting and personal problems. Through his relationships with the players and Kiriyama, he gradually confronts emotions and forms of attachment that cannot be reduced to equations.

== Cast and characters ==
=== Main characters ===
Fumito Gotetsu (伍鉄文人, Gotetsu Fumito)
Portrayed by Shinichi Tsutsumi. An associate professor at Tokei University who studies black holes. Brilliant, eccentric and tactless, he becomes an adviser to the Blaze Bulls. His floral shirts are a recurring visual characteristic.

Ryo Miyashita (宮下涼, Miyashita Ryō)
Portrayed by Yuki Yamada. A 36-year-old Blaze Bulls player and municipal welfare-department employee. He was captain of his high-school football team before a traffic accident left him a wheelchair user.

Hitoka Kiriyama (霧山人香, Kiriyama Hitoka)
Portrayed by Kasumi Arimura. An editor at Gem & Roots Publishing. She first meets the Blaze Bulls while reporting a magazine series about para-athletes and their support networks, and later joins the team as a support staff member.

=== Blaze Bulls ===
Masami Hino (日野雅美, Hino Masami)
Portrayed by Michiko Kichise. The team's head coach, a physical therapist and Gotetsu's cousin.

Natsuhiko Tachikawa (立川夏彦, Tachikawa Natsuhiko)
Portrayed by Yoshihiko Hosoda. The mild-mannered captain of the Blaze Bulls and an emotional anchor for the team. He became a wheelchair user after developing Charcot–Marie–Tooth disease.

Keijiro Asaya (朝谷圭二郎, Asaya Keijirō)
Portrayed by Kyoya Honda. A rebellious young man who joins the Blaze Bulls after facing Miyashita in wheelchair rugby. He was paralysed in a motorcycle accident.

Catherine Akiko Kimishima (君島キャサリン秋子, Kimishima Kyasarin Akiko)
Portrayed by Wan Marui. A returnee to Japan and a low-point player.

Takuya Bando (坂東拓也, Bandō Takuya)
Portrayed by Keitatsu Koshiyama. The youngest member of the team and a former snowboarder who was paralysed in a training accident.

=== Shark Head ===
Akiyasu Kunimi (国見明保, Kunimi Akiyasu)
Portrayed by Ken Yasuda. A former player who serves as head coach of Shark Head, the dominant rival team.

Soichi Taniguchi (谷口聡一, Taniguchi Sōichi)
Portrayed by Kanata Hosoda. A Shark Head player and member of the Japanese national team.

Oliver Bradley
Portrayed by Kazuki Sawai. A Canadian high-point player who briefly helps the Blaze Bulls while away from Shark Head.

=== Other recurring characters ===
Sora Sakamoto (坂本昊, Sakamoto Sora)
Portrayed by Yuta Tamamori. A former manager of the composer Tenjin who later becomes a supporter of the Blaze Bulls. He is eventually revealed to be Fumito Gotetsu's son.

Hiroe Sakamoto (坂本広江, Sakamoto Hiroe)
Portrayed by Tomoko Yamaguchi. An artist, Sora's mother and Gotetsu's former lover.

Sakura Munakata (宗像桜, Munakata Sakura)
Portrayed by Yu Miyazaki. A postdoctoral researcher in astrophysics at Tokei University.

Seiko Nishijin (西陣誠子, Nishijin Seiko)
Portrayed by Sei Matobu. Kiriyama's supervisor at Gem & Roots Publishing.

Kiyoshi Takamizu (高水潔, Takamizu Kiyoshi)
Portrayed by Hiromasa Taguchi. A highly skilled but stubborn wheelchair technician.

Kimiyo Miyashita (宮下君代, Miyashita Kimiyo)
Portrayed by Yumi Asō. Ryo's mother.

Tatsuya Miyashita (宮下達也, Miyashita Tatsuya)
Portrayed by Daikichi Sugawara. Ryo's father.

== Production ==
The series was conceived, planned and principally directed by Shunichi Hirano. Tomoki Kanazawa wrote the screenplay, with additional direction by Naoki Kato and Hiroaki Ito. Yuki Hayashi composed the score. Masako Miyazaki and Yuki Uchikawa served as producers, with Minami Nakazawa as cooperating producer.

The Japan Wheelchair Rugby Federation supervised and cooperated with the production. Wheelchair rugby players and federation personnel also appeared in competition and training scenes.

The theme song is "Stardust" by Official Hige Dandism, released through Irori Records and Pony Canyon. The insert song is "Ichirin" by Little Glee Monster.

== Episodes ==
No.	English translation of title	Directed by	Original air date	Household rating
1	"What Is With This Guy?! A Crazy Scientist Appears!"	Shunichi Hirano	12 April 2026	9.4%
2	"He's Actually Serious: The Genius Scientist Shows What He Can Do!"	Shunichi Hirano	19 April 2026	8.7%
3	"Why Do I Play Wheelchair Rugby?"	Shunichi Hirano	26 April 2026	8.5%
4	"The Stars Align! A Genius's Theory of Victory"	Naoki Kato	3 May 2026	6.8%
5	"When Two Stars Align, Will the Sound of Victory Ring Out?"	Naoki Kato	10 May 2026	6.9%
6	"A Turbulent Training Camp After the Genius Discovers He Has a Son"	Shunichi Hirano	17 May 2026	7.3%
7	"Fate Strikes the Team: A Father and Son's Tearful Melody"	Hiroaki Ito	24 May 2026	7.5%
8	"On the Eve of Battle: A Fiery Vow Beneath the Stars"	Naoki Kato	31 May 2026	6.0%
9	"Dazzling Stardust"	Shunichi Hirano	7 June 2026	7.2%
10	"The Final! A Gift Reached Beyond Love and Miracles"	Shunichi Hirano	14 June 2026	7.6%

The premiere was extended by 25 minutes and aired from 9:00 to 10:19 p.m. The second episode was extended by 15 minutes and aired until 10:09 p.m.

The series recorded an average real-time household audience rating of 7.6% in the Kanto region, according to Video Research. Japanese media reported that it was the first drama in the Sunday Theatre block for which every episode remained below a 10% household rating.

== Spin-off ==
A four-episode side story, SHIFT: Those Who Collide and Move Forward (Japanese: SHIFT―ぶつかり、進む者たち―), was released on U-Next after selected broadcasts of the main series. It stars Kyoya Honda as Keijiro Asaya and follows events connected to the Blaze Bulls.

Other cast members include Kazuto Mokudai as Hayato Okihira and Kasumi Mori as Mio Aoki, with Tsutsumi, Arimura, Yamada and other actors from the main series reprising their roles. Kota Sawada wrote the spin-off, which was directed by Naoki Kato and Hiroaki Ito.

No.	Release date	English translation of title	Director
1	12 April 2026	"Reunion"	Naoki Kato
2	26 April 2026	"Rekindling"	Hiroaki Ito
3	31 May 2026	"Rebirth"	Hiroaki Ito
4	14 June 2026	"Regeneration"	Naoki Kato

== Home media ==
A Blu-ray and DVD box set is scheduled for release in Japan on 13 January 2027.
