= Réka Tóth-Vásárhelyi =

Hungarian Wood and Textile Artist, Kokeshi Artist, Art teacher (1975)

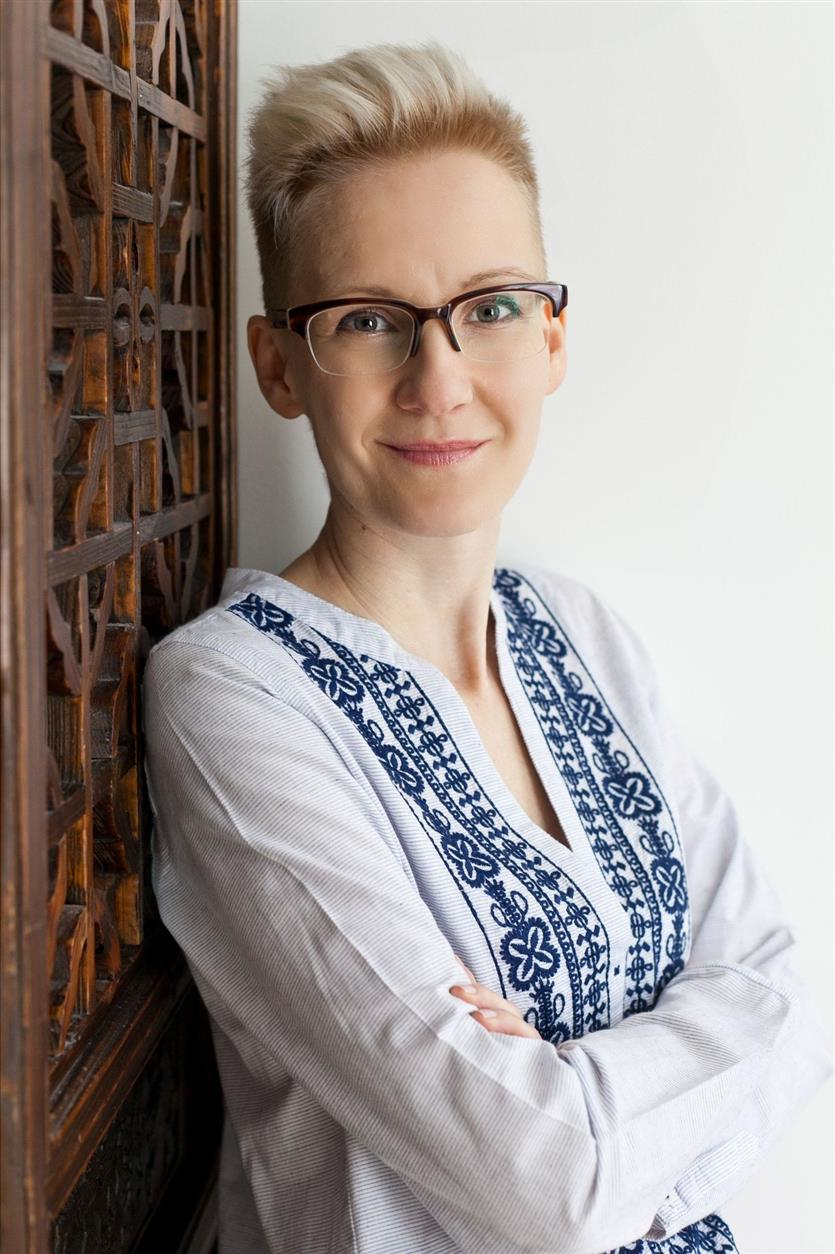
- Born: 27 July 1975; Budapest, Hungary
- Other name: Renka
- Occupations: Wood and Textile Artist, Kokeshi Artist, Art teacher

Réka Tóth-Vásárhelyi (artist name: Renka) (Budapest, 27 July 1975 – ) is a Hungarian wood and textile artist, Kokeshi artist and art teacher, a maker of kokeshi dolls, the first foreign prize winner of the 2015 National Kokeshi Doll Competition in Shiroishi, Japan and its first foreign grand prize winner in 2016. She is a representative of the modern branch of Kokeshi Art.

== Family ==
Her father, József Tóth-Vásárhelyi, is an architect, and her mother, Éva Tóth-Vásárhelyi, is a history teacher. Her brother, Máté, is an archaeologist. Her maternal grandfather, József Tóth-Vásárhelyi, was a harmonica artist who played music for the first Hungarian sound films.

== Education ==
She graduated from Széchenyi István Secondary Grammar School in 1993 and obtained her degree in Primary and Pre-School Education from Eötvös Loránd University in 2000. In 2001, she completed her studies at Eszterházy Károly Teacher Training College in Eger, Hungary, specializing in Visual Education with a research focus on Japanese art methodology. She also pursued various art forms such as ikebana, calligraphy, and ink painting. She ventured into sculpting and discovered woodworking through sculptor Jun Tsukawaki. In 2004, she enrolled at Atelier Interior Design School in Budapest, followed by a postgraduate course at Moholy-Nagy University of Art and Design (MOME) where she earned her MA in Art and Textile Design Education. She continued her academic journey as a PhD student in Alternative Art Education at the University of Art and Design Linz (Kunstuniversität Linz) from 2008 onwards.

== Artistic practice ==
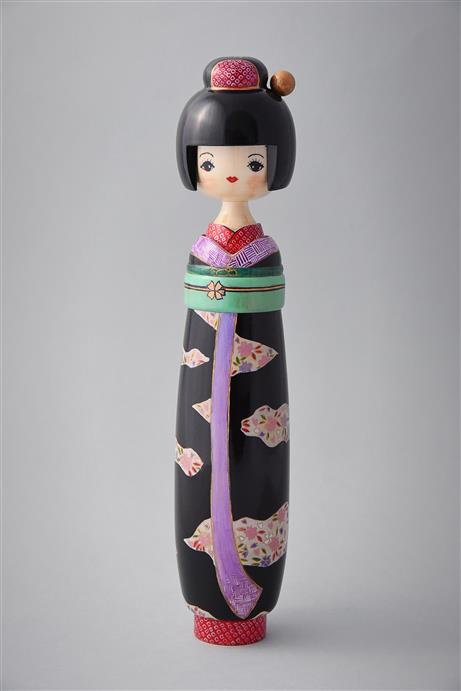
Maiko

She fell in love with Eastern culture as a child. Her family had Japanese neighbours for many years, and the two families lived side by side almost as a community. She was captivated by Japanese culture ever since. Her ambition was to go to Japan after graduation, but at the time of the regime change, she was unable to do so. She was awarded a Japanese art scholarship 2002-2004.

She was on maternity leave with her first child in 2009 when a sudden idea gave birth to her book “A Csodálatos Fababa Meséje” (The Story of the Miraculous Wooden Doll). In this book, written in both Japanese and Hungarian, she tells the story of Sakura, the Kokeshi doll and the adventures leading her to the imperial family. Her great interest in this fairy tale and its main character, the Kokeshi doll, led her to start making Kokeshi dolls. In 2011, she made eight dolls for an exhibition in Szombathely, and soon she had 190, making 1,500 in a year. She started looking for her style in the creative kokeshi category, developing her own technique. She uses a high gloss lacquer, so her dolls are much shinier than usual kokeshis. She paints meticulous, and unique finely detailed patterns and the dolls' faces.

From the functional features, she has kept and shaped the kokeshi doll's usability as a souvenir (a children's toy that reflects the beliefs of Japanese culture and which is also a souvenir), and from the formal features (traditional and free forms), she has retained creativity and shaped it according to her own taste and possibilities.

Her dolls are smaller in size than the usual ones in Japan, where they are up to one meter high, since in Hungary there is no suitable wood material to make them. The dolls are made from different types of wood and the colour and surface of the chosen mizuki, maple or non-splintering Japanese cherry wood determines the final result. Japanese wood is easier to use for making kokeshis. These have high oil content and therefore dry out more slowly and do not crack. In the last few years, she has been buying raw material from Japan. She paints the dolls herself, but someone else does the wood turning and varnishing. Her dolls are all unique, with meticulously, finely carved faces and ornate kimonos.

The dolls, turned and carved from wood, embody the Japanese ideal of feminine beauty with their clean shapes: neat black hair, a charming, gentle white face and a body dressed in closed, decorated kimonos. Their decoration and painted patterns are often linked to the seasons. There is hardly a Japanese household without at least one kokeshi. In terms of shape, there are smaller and larger figures of girls, cylindrical and spherical, samurai, monks and many others with features specific to the region from where the kokeshi originates.

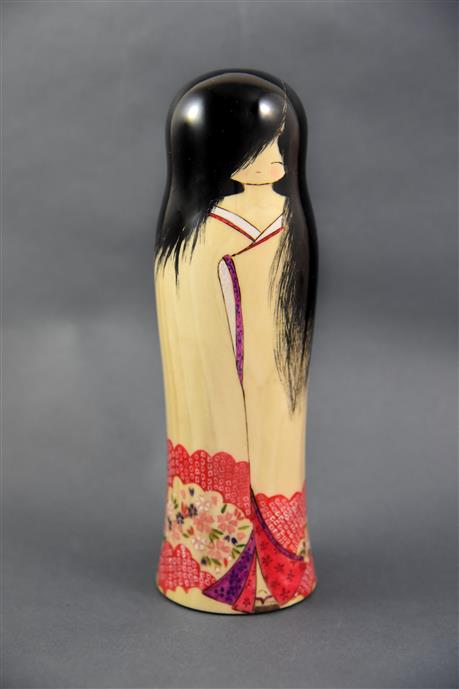
Hair downpour

Besides being an aesthetic ornament, in Japanese culture the kokeshi has a much deeper meaning and function: it has also been used as a children's toy, a souvenir, a talisman with healing powers. Since the Middle Ages, every family in northern Japan has had at least one kokeshi as a full member of the family, giving protection from famine, fire and disease. It is therefore an integral part of the traditions and beliefs of the Japanese people and, with these in mind, the symbols permeate their entire artistic activity. Its aim is to open people's hearts to the love and respect of the natural, simple, volatile and imperfect gifts of life. Symbols, inner messages and inspirational thoughts are important to her. When making a doll, she first looks at the "soul" of the wood, because the piece of wood also brings its soul with it. Furthermore, the use of symbols is an integral part of Japanese culture, as the seasons change, everything is covered with the current natural symbols, from gastronomy to clothing, in all aspects of life. The decorations on her dolls are also designed accordingly, so they carry a lot of extra meaning, like a kind of cipher. While painting her dolls, she tries to chant mantras as much as possible to make them radiate peace and love in their new home. She often gives them Japanese names with positive messages.

One of her two distinguished themes is the presentation of Hungarian folk costumes through these wooden dolls. So far, she has painted the costumes of 54 regions, but there are still a lot more to come, and she would like to illustrate them for a book later. Her aim is to integrate tradition into today's modern environment and living space. The other theme is the fate of women, in connection with which her intention is to portray charm and also to show the true face of the soul, with all the pain it has brought and collected.

She wishes to bring the cultures of the two countries even closer together through Kokeshi dolls, and "to open people's hearts through her creations to the love and respect for the natural, simple, fleeting and imperfect gifts of life."

== International career ==
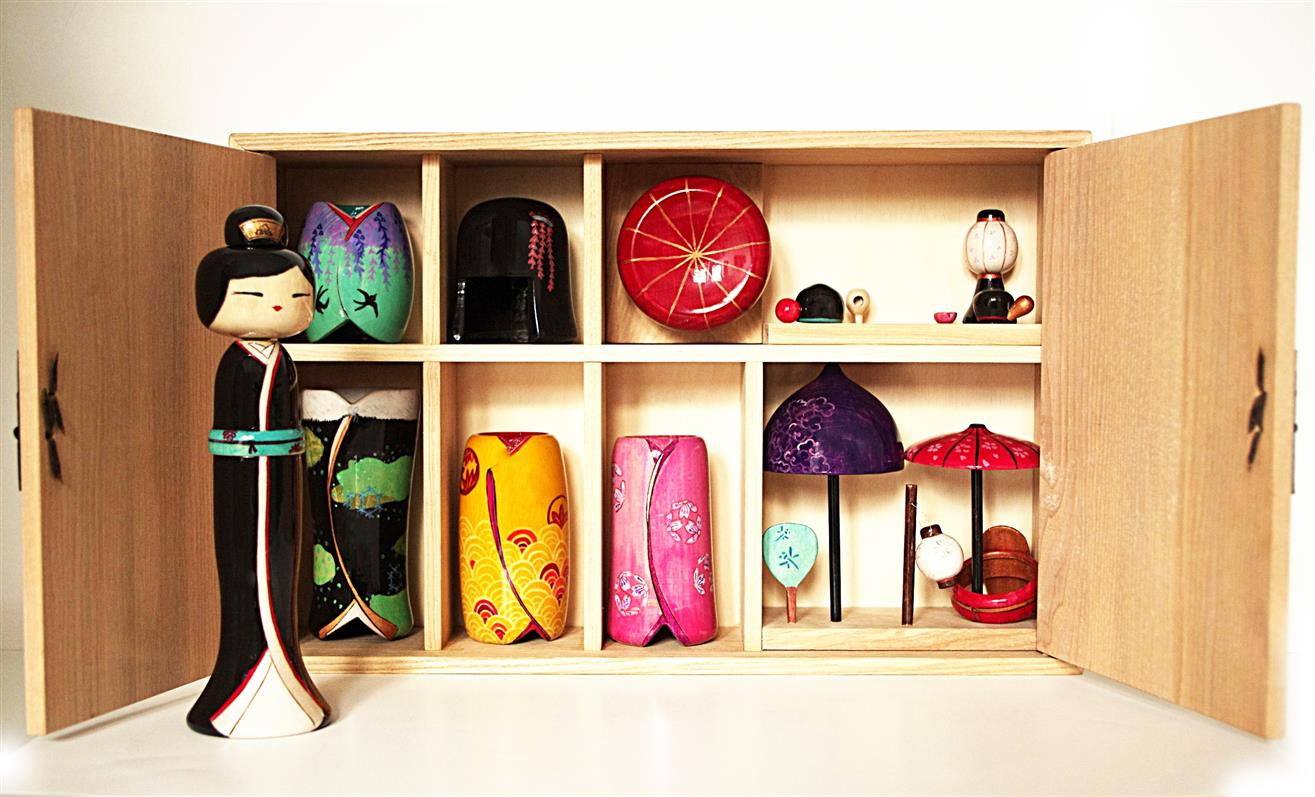
Dress-up Kokeshi - With a Wardrobe

In 2015, she became the first foreigner to compete in the 57th Japanese National Kokeshi Competition, and was awarded the Governor of Miyagi Prefecture Award for her doll Kaguja hime. In 2016, she was the first foreigner to compete in the 58th Japanese National Kokeshi Competition. She was the only foreigner to compete for the second time in the 58th Japanese National Kokeshi Competition, winning the grand prize in the creative category, the Japanese Minister of Economy, Trade and Industry's award for her work entitled "Dress-up Kokeshi - with a Wardrobe." In addition to the perfect execution of the winning work, her creativity also attracted the attention of the jury. In addition to the kokeshi doll, the piece, made of hornbeam, beech and ashwood, includes a wardrobe with 17 meticulously crafted accessories such as kimonos, hats, umbrellas, lanterns and fans. The idea that a kokeshi doll can be dressed in different outfits and accessories to suit the season and the occasion is quite unique. She was the first foreigner to get near to the closed cultural circle of Japanese Kokeshi making masters. She was welcomed and allowed closer to their professional knowledge and workshops techniques, which, according to Jennifer McDowell, an American kokeshi sociologist, as a woman, as a foreigner in a massively constructed masculine system, "can be seen as breaking through an anthropological wall."

In the spring of 2016, she received the blessing of Master Kokeshi-Makers in a Shinto ceremony. In the same year, she attended the Dalai Lama's Kalachakra empowerment in Leh, India.

At the 59th Japanese National Kokeshi Competition her kokeshi-rattle won the Ebina City Mayor's Award. Later that year, in Tokyo, her Taiko drum was awarded the Outstanding Artwork Award at the Creative Kokeshi Competition, and in the summer of 2018, her work titled “Crane and Turtle” won the Jury's Special Prize at the same competition.

Japanese masters began to trust her, and after the award, she was invited to Shibukawa for the Creative Kokeshi Exhibition, where she met Aoki Ryoka (青木蓼華), the first Japanese female creative master kokeshi maker to be awarded the Imperial Medal of Merit, who took her on and invited her to her workshop. In 2017, in addition to the National Kokeshi Competition, she was invited to the Creative Kokeshi Competition in Tokyo, where her work has been awarded annually since then. In 2019, she was commissioned by the Hungarian Embassy in Tokyo to create a pair of dolls to commemorate the 150th anniversary of the establishment of diplomatic relations between the two countries, showing both cultural differences and similarities, which were then given as a souvenir by the Embassy to several prominent people, among others to the Imperial Court of Japan. In 2020, on the occasion of the 90th birthday of her master, Aoki Ryoka, and on her 45th birthday, a joint exhibition was held at the exhibition hall of the Sugamoi Buddhist Shrine in Tokyo, organized by the Hungarian Embassy.

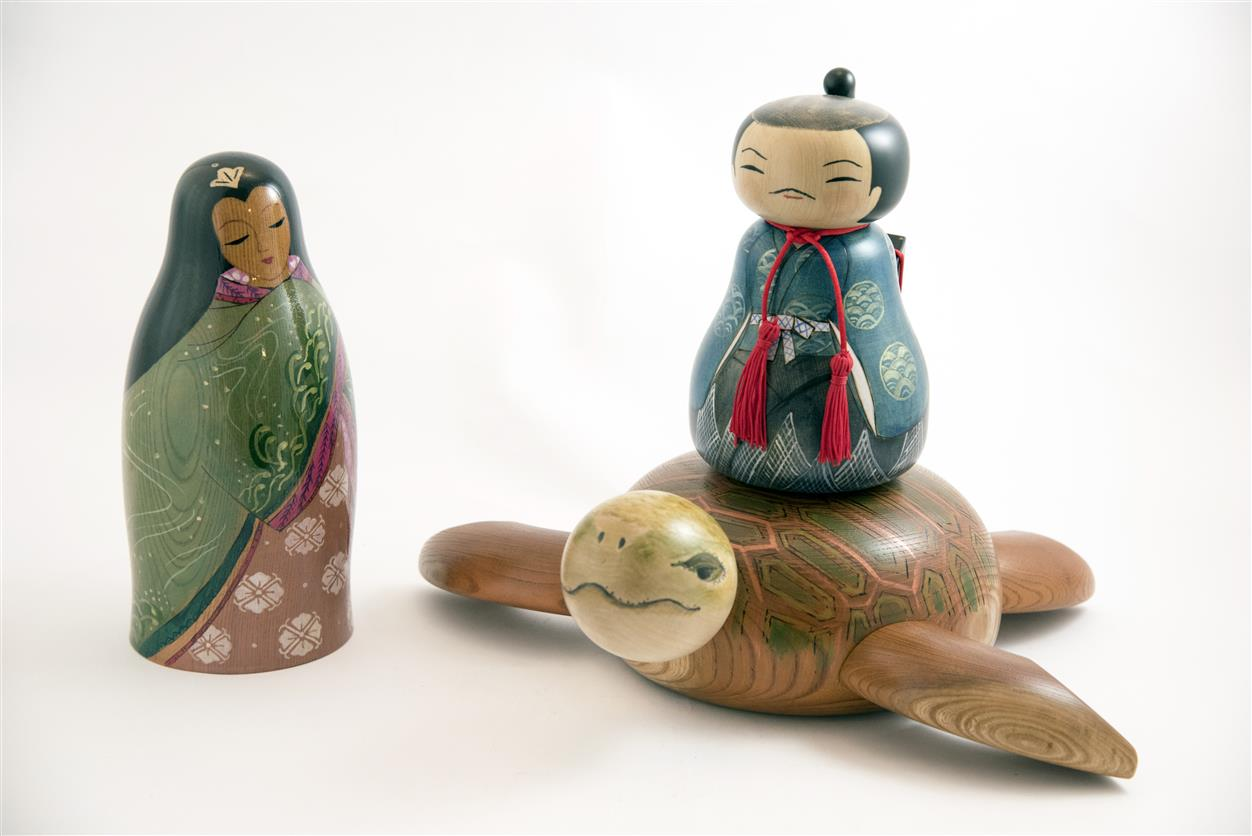
The Tale of Urashima Tarō

Aoki Ryoka inspired the artist name Renka. According to Japanese customs, the student receives a kanji from her master's name so the syllable -ka at the end of the name Ryoka was given to the artist. Renka means lotus-blossom-glow. Aoki later asked her to finish her half-finished creations, dolls weighing about 100 kilograms.

In March 2016, a product quality assessment by the MANK, Petőfi Cultural Agency Ltd. (MANK is the abbreviation of “Hungarian Nonprofit Association for Arts and Crafts” in Hungarian) classified and certified all of her creations as being of the highest quality in the category of applied arts.

The name of the Kokeshi brand is Katagami Kokeshi, from which the brand name for non-Japanese dolls became KAKO... By 2025, the number of Kokeshi dolls made is well over 35,000.

She has exhibited her work and given lectures on the tradition and history of kokeshi at numerous exhibitions in Japan, Europe, the US and at home.

== Other activities ==
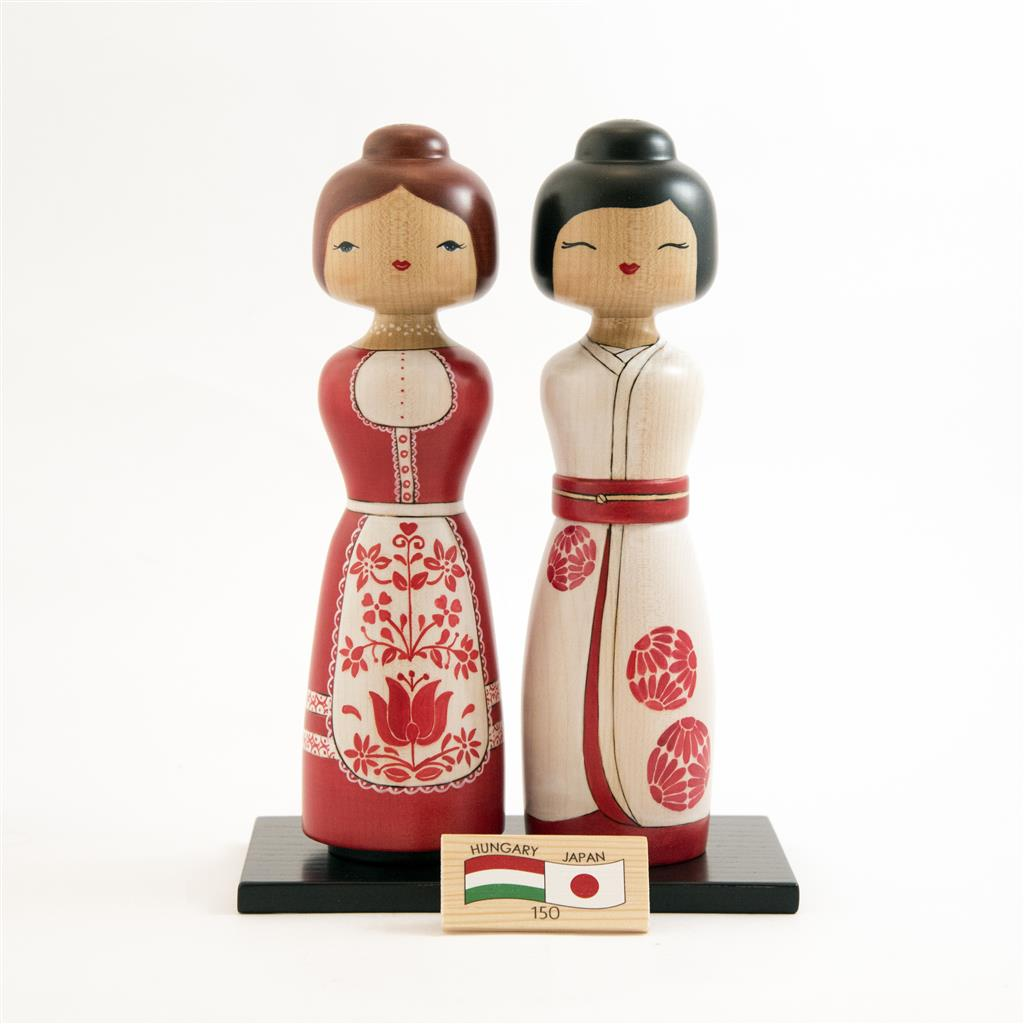
Kokeshi dolls made for the 150th anniversary of Japanese-Hungarian diplomatic relations >

She participated in the decorative painting of the Milarepa Meditation Centre in Zalaszántó. In Zangla Palace in India, in the Kőrösi Csoma Room, she made a memorial statue of the enlightened, meditating Sándor Kőrösi Csoma. The pilgrim made the statue of Sándor Kőrösi Csoma and the statue of Lama Dorji Lopön Ngawang rinpoche in the Buddha Park - Sándor Kőrösi Csoma Memorial Park. In 2019, as a commemorative gift for the 150th anniversary of Hungarian-Japanese diplomatic relations, the Hungarian Embassy in Tokyo commissioned the production of 30 pairs of wooden dolls to symbolize the relationship between the two countries. The diplomatic dolls were given to a number of prominent personalities, including several members of the imperial court. She received a personal letter of thanks from Suzuki Osamu, President of Suzuki Motor Corporation.

For a while, she made Kokeshi pendants, but thought they could be more playful if they appeared on clothes. In 2018, they collaborated with Beatrix White to release a joint collection of charming Kokeshi dolls on cool urban suits. The kokeshi dolls are used as decorative elements on dresses, skirts, jackets and bags.

She has been a member of the Hungary-Japan Friendship Society since 2000. She was also a member of the National Association of Art Teachers and InSEA (The International Society for Education Through Art).

== Awards and honors ==
- 2025 Foreign Minister’s of Japan Commendations for FY 2025: The Foreign Minister’s Commendations are awarded to individuals and groups with outstanding achievements in international fields, in order to acknowledge their contributions to the promotion of friendship between Japan and other countries and areas.
- 2022 Yamagata City Mayor's Award, 64th Japan National Kokeshi Exhibition and Competition, Shiroishi Zao, Japan
- 2019 Special Award, Creative Kokeshi Competition, Tokyo, Japan
- 2019 Gunma Province Governor Award, 60th Japan National Kokeshi Exhibition and Competition, Shiroishi Zao, Japan
- 2018 The Jury's Special Prize, Creative Kokeshi Competition, Tokyo, Japan
- 2017 Award for Outstanding Work, Creative Kokeshi Competition, Tokyo-Ginza, Japan
- 2017 Ebina City Mayor's Award, 59th Japan National Kokeshi Exhibition and Competition, Shiroishi Zao, Japan
- 2016 Japan Minister of Economy, Trade and Industry Award (first in category, second overall), 58th Japan National Kokeshi Exhibition and Competition, Shiroishi Zao, Japan
- 2016-03 Product quality assessment of MANK, Petőfi Cultural Agency Ltd. (Hungarian Nonprofit Association for Arts and Crafts) on the classification in the highest quality applied arts category
- 2015 Mijagi Province Governor's Award (first foreign winner) 57th Japan National Kokesh Exhibition and Competition, Shiroishi Zao

== Gallery ==
Réka Tóth-Vásárhelyi's Works of Art
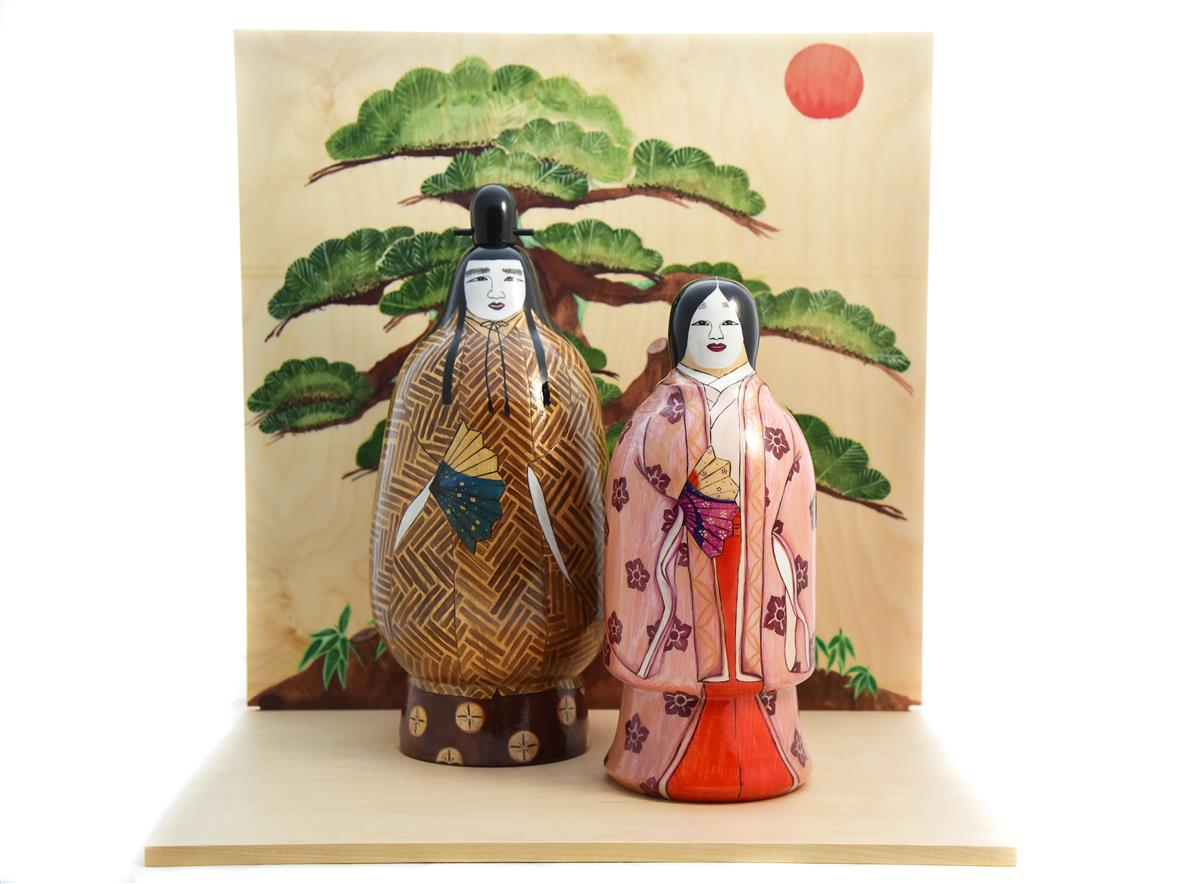
Noh Theatre

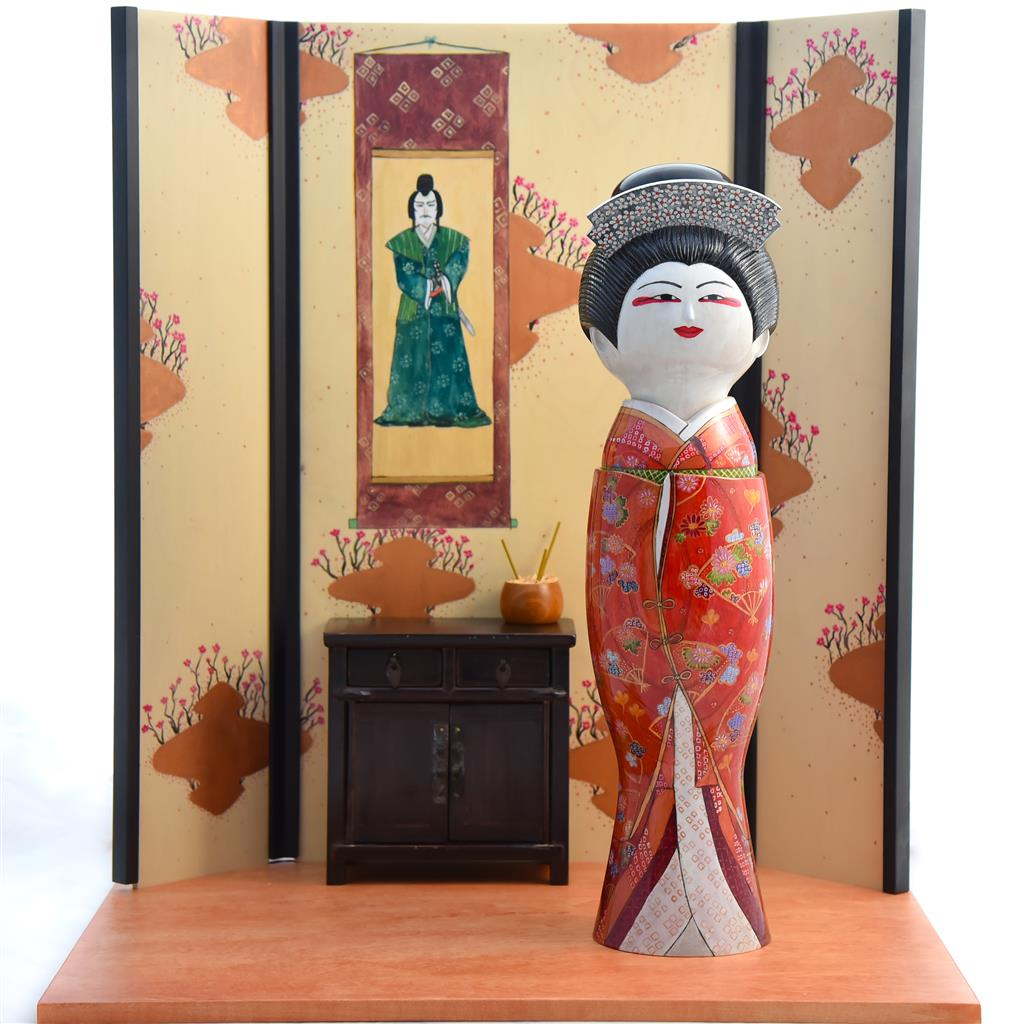
Kabuki Theatre

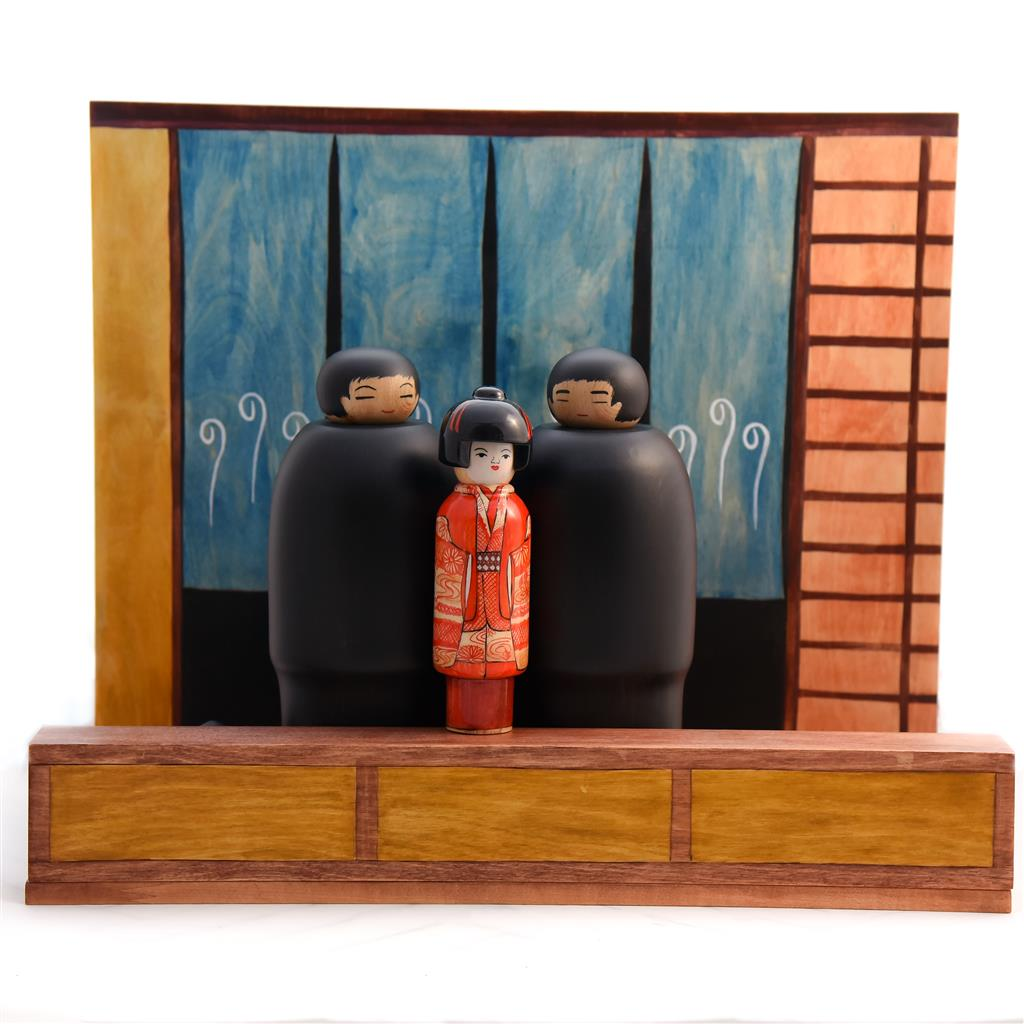
Bunraku Theatre

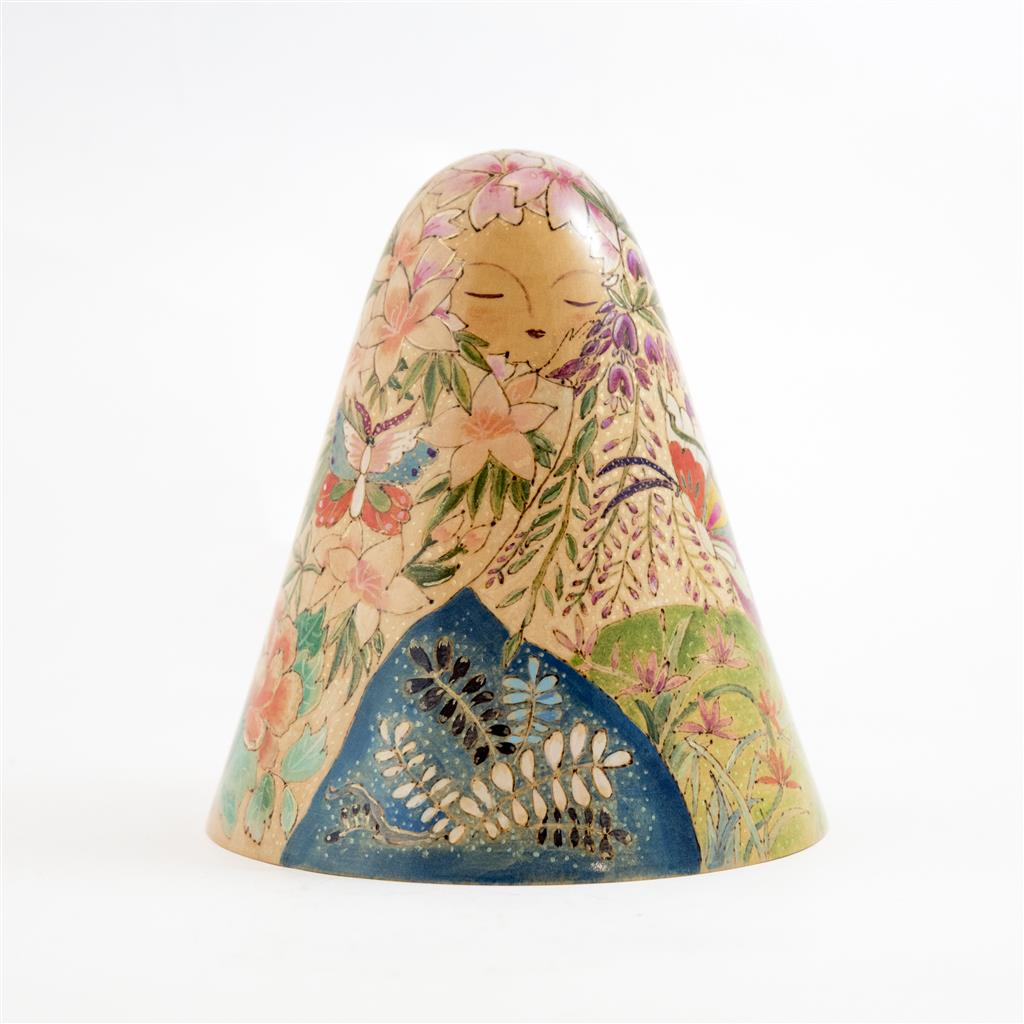
The Touch of Flowers

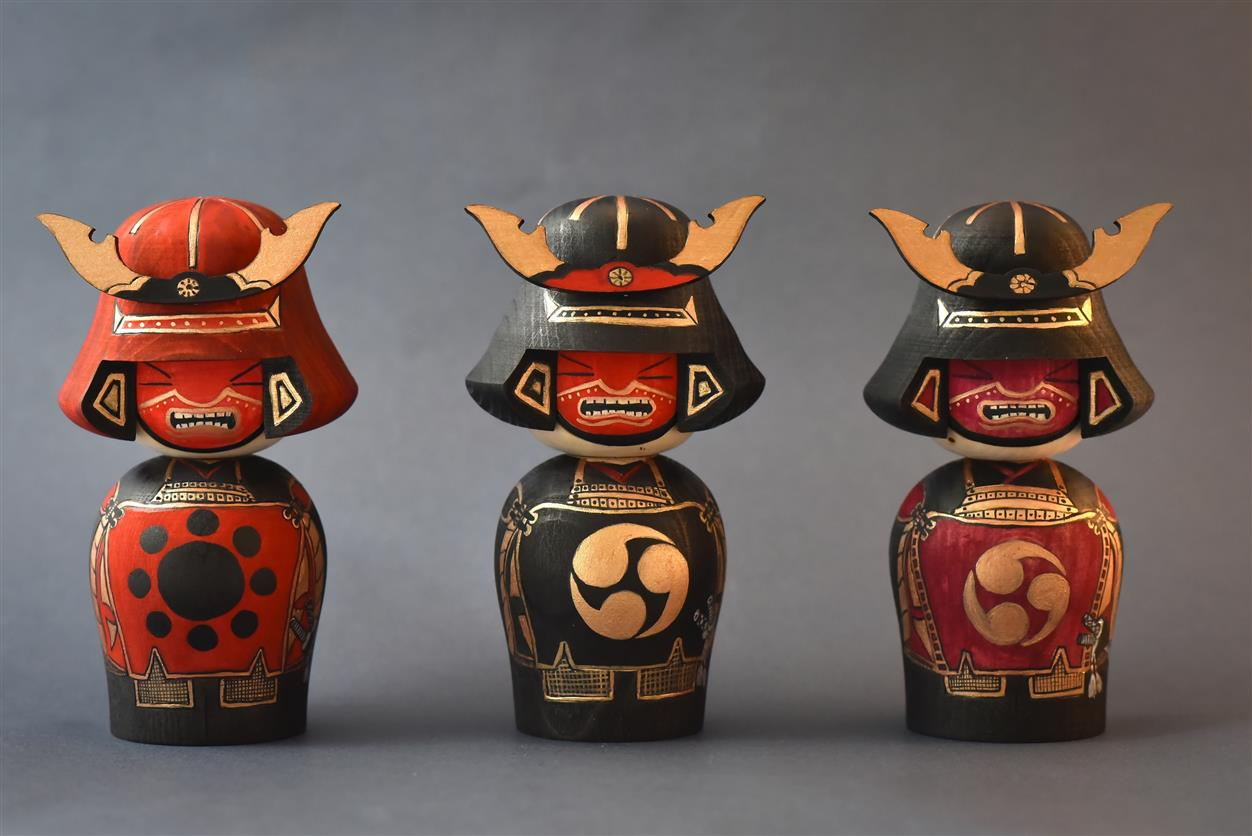
Samurai

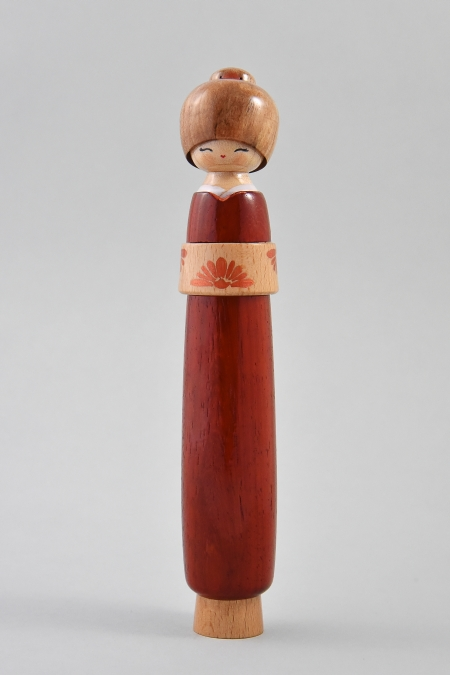
Chrysanthemum

== Published books ==
- Réka Tóth-Vásárhelyi - Ibolya Rácz: Kokesi – A japán fababák világa (Kokeshi - The World of Japanese Fables), Napkút Kiadó, 2019, ISBN 9789632638805
- Réka Tóth-Vásárhelyi : Rizómák, melyek a fény felé törnek (Rhizomes that break towards the light), Napkút Kiadó, 2012, ISBN 9789632632704
- Réka Tóth-Vásárhelyi : A csodálatos fababa meséje (The Story of the Wonderful Wooden Doll), Napkút Kiadó, 2009, ISBN 9789632631011
- Réka Tóth-Vásárhelyi - Kata Tasi : Mesél a világ (The World tells a Story), Magyar Napló Kiadó, 2006, ISBN 9639603376
- Tandori Dezső Dezső Tandori - Réka Tóth-Vásárhelyi, Kavicsok (Pebbles), Print-X, Budapest, 2004, ISBN 9638654562 Haiku translations by Dezső Tandori with pictures by Réka Tóth-Vásárhelyi

== Sources ==
- Sárdi Krisztina (1 September 2018). "Az út a cél" [The Path is the Goal]. Magyar Hírlap. 51 (203): Hétvégi Melléklet I-IV.
- Ongjerth Hanna (8 January 2013). "Talpra, baba!" [On your feet Kokeshi Doll!]. Népszabadság. 71 (6): 20.
- Barta Boglárka (31 January 2018). "A fa lelke" [The Soul of Wood]. Magyar Demokrata. 22 (5): 62–63.
- Szabó Brigitta (15 February 2018). "Cseresznyevirág életre kel – Tóth-Vásárhelyi Réka, a kokesivarázsló" [Cherry Blossom comes to life - Réka Tóth-Vásárhelyi the Kokeshi Magician]. 168 Óra. 30 (7): 60–61.
- Magyarország sikeres személyiségei [Hungary's successful personalities]. BPH – British Publishing House Ltd. 2019.
- "Kokeshik üzenete Japánból" [Kokeshi's message from Japan]. fataj.hu. 22 January 2018.
- "10 éve a kokeshi babák bűvöletében" [10 years under the spell of Kokeshi Dolls]. kakehashi.hu. 21 March 2021.
- Szabó Brigitta (25 February 2018). "Cseresznyevirág életre kel – Tóth-Vásárhelyi Réka, a kokesivarázsló" [Cherry Blossom comes to Life - Réka Tóth-Vásárhelyi the Kokeshi Magician]. 168.hu.
- "Interjú Tóth-Vásárhelyi Réka iparművésszel" (in Hungarian). Liszt Institute Hungarian Cultural Center New York. 18 June 2025.

== Further information ==
- Sorsszerű találkozás a kokeshikkel – Tóth-Vásárhelyi Réka és a japán fababák készítése on YouTube (A fateful encounter with Kokeshis - Réka Tóth-Vásárhelyi and the making of Japanese wooden dolls)
