= Black and White: Tough Love at the Office =

Japanese yuri manga

- First tankōbon volume cover

白と黒～Black & White～ (Shiro to Kuro ~Black & White~)
- Genre: Drama; Romance; Yuri
- Manga
- Written by: Sal Jiang
- Published by: Jitsugyo no Nihon Sha
- English publisher: NA: Seven Seas Entertainment
- Magazine: Comic Ruelle
- Original run: March 20, 2020 – May 18, 2023
- Volumes: 3

Black and White: Tough Love at the Office (白と黒～Black & White～, Shiro to Kuro ~Black & White~) is a Japanese yuri manga written and illustrated by Sal Jiang. It began serialization online via Jitsugyo no Nihon Sha's Comic Ruelle on March 20, 2020, and is licensed for an English-language release by Seven Seas Entertainment.

The series follows the love-hate relationship between Junko Shirakawa and Kayo Kuroda, two employees of a high-level bank.

== Plot ==
Junko Shirakawa, who works at a high-level bank, is regarded as an exceptional employee by her colleagues. Kayo Kuroda, who joined the firm at the same time as Shirakawa, gets transferred to Shirakawa's department one day. Shirakawa is put in charge of Kuroda's department training, which completely changes their working life, and sparks a bizarre love-hate relationship that results in either violent office brawls or angry sex.

== Publication ==
Written and illustrated by Sal Jiang, Black and White: Tough Love at the Office began serialization online via Jitsugyo no Nihon Sha's Comic Ruelle on March 20, 2020. The series has been collected in three tankōbon volumes as of May 2023.

The series is licensed for an English release in North America by Seven Seas Entertainment. In 2024 Seven Seas Entertainment announced an omnibus collection of the series titled "Tough Love at the Office: The Complete Yuri Collection".

No.	Original release date	Original ISBN	English release date	English ISBN
1	April 15, 2021	978-4-40-864005-1	October 11, 2022; July 22, 2025	978-1-63858-528-2
2	May 19, 2022	978-4-40-864058-7	July 22, 2025	979-8-89373-395-2
3	May 18, 2023	978-4-40-864091-4	July 22, 2025	979-8-89373-395-2

== Reception ==
Erica Friedman of Yuricon praised the series, giving volumes one and two a 10 out of 10 rating; remarking in her review that the first volume "is so frickin' nasty, I literally grinned my way through it ... This is not a pretty book about an office romance. This is a violent story about two terrible people being terrible to one another. I love it."

Black and White: Tough Love at the Office was among WomenWriteAboutComics's "Favorite Manga of 2022", with Masha Zhdanova regarding the series as offering an alternative to more typical school-related romances often seen in yuri and remarking that "the rivalry between Shirakawa and Kuroda crackles with chemistry, and Jiang draws the two of them fighting and having sex with a specificity that makes the whole thing feel grounded, rather than the ethereal above-it-all purity older yuri comics often have."

== See also ==
- Ayaka Is in Love with Hiroko! and Wicked Spot, other manga series' by the same author.
