= A Calm Sea and Beautiful Days with You =

Japanese manga series by Nishika Hachi

- First tankōbon volume cover

波うららかに、めおと日和 (Nami Uraraka ni, Meoto Biyori)
- Genre: Historical; Romantic comedy; Slice of life
- Manga
- Written by: Nishika Hachi
- Published by: Kodansha
- Imprint: Morning KC
- Magazine: Comic Days
- Original run: October 14, 2022 – present
- Volumes: 10
- Television drama
- Directed by: Makoto Hirano; Tonobu Moriwaki; Toshifumi Kunitake (Film)
- Written by: Yoko Izumisawa
- Music by: Nohei Ueda
- Studio: Fuji Television
- Original network: FNS (Fuji TV)
- Original run: April 24, 2025 – June 6, 2025
- Episodes: 10
- icon

A Calm Sea and Beautiful Days with You (Japanese: 波うららかに、めおと日和, Hepburn: Nami Uraraka ni, Meoto Biyori; lit. 'The Waves are Gentle and it's a Perfect Day for a Wedding') is a Japanese manga series written and illustrated by Nishika Hachi. The manga has been serialized on Kodansha's online platform Comic Days since October 2022. It is a romantic comedy set in the early Showa period and follows the newlywed couple Lieutenant Takimasa and his wife Natsumi. As of September 2025, the total number of copies in circulation, including e-books, had exceeded 1.5 million. It was adapted into a live-action television drama that aired on Fuji Television and its affiliates from April to June 2025.

== Plot ==
It is set in 1936, during the early Showa period. Natsumi Sekiya's father informs her that he has arranged her marriage to an Imperial Navy Lieutenant, Takimasa Ebata, without her knowledge, and that they are to be wed the following week. Although shocked and anxious about the sudden news, Natsumi follows through with the ceremony even though her fiancé cannot be present due to his work commitments. When Takimasa finally arrives two weeks after the wedding and they meet for the first time, he is distant and indifferent toward Natsumi, and their first few weeks of living together are filled with humorous misunderstandings. Despite these challenges, the two gradually grow closer.

== Characters ==
=== Main characters ===
Natsumi Ebata (江端 なつ美, née Sekiya; 関谷)
Portrayed by: Kyoko Yoshine (TV series); Yui Otoiro (Theater)
Natsumi is the third daughter of the Sekiya family, with two older sisters and one younger sister. She often has her head in the clouds and is a bit clumsy—traits that often cause her family to worry—yet her earnest approach to expanding her horizons made her husband become fond of her.
Takimasa Ebata (江端 瀧昌)
Portrayed by: Kyoya Honda (TV series); Jun Asami (Theater)
Takimasa is a lieutenant of the Imperial Japanese Navy. He is reserved and maintained a stoic life before his marriage to Natsumi. Due to his unfortunate experiences in childhood, he was generally only comfortable with his adoptive parents.

=== Sekiya Family ===
Atsuzo Sekiya (関谷 篤三)
Portrayed by: Tsutomu Takahashi
Natsumi's father.
Satsuki Sekiya (関谷 さつき)
Portrayed by: Mahiru Konno
Natsumi's mother.
Harue Sekiya (関谷 はる江)
Portrayed by: Kanna Mori
Natsumi's eldest sister and the eldest daughter of the Sekiya family.
Akina Sekiya (関谷 あき奈)
Portrayed by: Miyu Sakihi
Natsumi's second eldest sister.
Fuyuko Sekiya (関谷 ふゆ子)
Portrayed by: Aya Ogawa
The fourth and youngest sibling of the Sekiya sisters.

=== Other supporting characters ===
Ikuko Shibahara (柴原 郁子)
Portrayed by: Emi Wakui
Takimasa's adoptive mother and Kunimitsu's wife.
Kunimitsu Shibahara (柴原 邦光)
Portrayed by: Shigemitsu Ogi
He is Takimasa's adoptive father and Ikuko's husband. He was a close acquaintance with Takimasa's late father and formally took him in after he became orphaned and allowed him to live in their detached house.
Benshi (活動 弁士)
Portrayed by: Katsuhisa Namase
The narrator of the story, he explains the culture of the time and comments on the characters from the viewer's perspective.
Ryunosuke Fukami (深見 龍之介)
Portrayed by: Yuta Koseki
Is a Navy officer at the Imperial Japanese Navy. He is Takimasa's colleague and close acquaintance. He is popular with the women.
Juntaro Seta (瀬田 準太郎)
Portrayed by: Rio Komiya
Natsumi's childhood friend from elementary school and Atsuzo Sekiya's apprentice secretary.
Yoshiharu Sakai (坂井 嘉治)
Portrayed by: Junki Tozuka
Childhood friend of Takimasa who runs a sweet shop.
Fumiko Yoshimori (芳森 芙美子)
Portrayed by: Maika Yamamoto
She is a typist. She meets Natsumi and becomes friends with her at the naval officers' wives association group. Even though she's not a naval officer's wife, she feels obligated to be present, as her aunt is the head of the group.
Mitsuko Hashimoto (橋本 光子)
Portrayed by: Mariko Tsutsui
She is Fumiko Yoshimori's aunt. She is the head and founder of the naval officers' wives association group.
Fumiko Fukami (深見 芙美子)
Portrayed by: Erika Ikuta
Wife of Navy officer Ryunosuke Fukami.

== Media ==
=== Manga ===
Written and illustrated by Nishika Hachi, A Calm Sea and Beautiful Days with You began serialization on Kodansha's online platform Comic Days on October 14, 2022. Its chapters have been compiled into ten tankōbon volumes as of January 2026.

No.	Release date	ISBN
1	March 8, 2023	978-4-06-531122-6
2	June 14, 2023	978-4-06-532014-3
3	September 13, 2023	978-4-06-533059-3
4	January 10, 2024	978-4-06-534350-0
5	May 8, 2024	978-4-06-535378-3
6	September 11, 2024	978-4-06-536701-8
7	January 8, 2025	978-4-06-537959-2
8	May 14, 2025	978-4-06-539304-8
9	September 10, 2025	978-4-06-540702-8
10	January 14, 2026	978-4-06-542059-1; 978-4-06-542890-0 (SE)
11	April 8, 2026	978-4-06-543066-8; 978-4-06-543151-1 (SE)

=== Live-action drama ===
A live-action television drama adaptation was announced on March 19, 2025. The series was directed by Hirano Makoto, Moriwaki Tomoyasu, and Kunitake Toshifumi from a screenplay by Yoko Izumisawa. It aired on television and on online platforms such as TVer from April 24 to June 6, 2025. The show starred Kyoko Yoshine and Kyoya Honda as the leads. The show's intro song is "Muchū" (Crazy About), performed by Be:First. A second season of the series was announced on April 29, 2026.

== Reception ==
The television live-action adaptation was well received by audiences and between its initial broadcast date and May 21, 2025, the series recorded high viewership figures, exceeding 13 million viewers for three consecutive weeks. On-demand streaming views rose for every episodes after Episode 1 which saw 2 million regular viewers through Episode 4.

Orders for the "Gimel Ring," which appeared in episode 7, poured in. This surge prompted Somm Jewelry, the brand that supplied the ring, to announce via X that they have reached their capacity and have temporarily suspended orders.

On June 5, in Modelpress's list titled "Top 10 Heartthrob Guys from Spring 2025 Dramas," Takimasa Ebata, portrayed by Kyoya Honda, was ranked first. His votes were double those of the second-placed character in the survey.

== Stage ==
=== Theater ===
It is scheduled to be adapted into a musical play by the theatre troupe Takarazuka Revue on March 11, 2026. It stars Yui Otoiro as Natsumi Ebata and Jun Asami as Lieutenant Takimasa Ebata.
