= Kyoya Honda =

Japanese actor and model (born 1999)

- Born: June 20, 1999 (age 27); Fukui Prefecture, Japan
- Occupations: Actor; model
- Years active: 2017–present
- Agent: A-Plus
- Height: 175 cm (5 ft 9 in)

Japanese name
- Kanji: 本田 響矢
- Hiragana: ほんだ きょうや
Transcriptions
- Romanization: Honda Kyōya
- Website: honda-kyoya.com

Kyoya Honda (本田 響矢, Honda Kyōya; born June 20, 1999) is a Japanese actor and model. As a model, he gained recognition after winning the grand prize at the "High School Mr. Con 2016," organized by the teen fashion magazine Seventeen.

== Personal life ==
Honda's hobbies include playing the drums and karaoke, in addition he is skilled in kendo.

== Filmography ==
=== Film ===
Year	Title	Role	Notes	Ref.
2019	Hot Gimmick: Girl Meets Boy	Minokawa		
2021	Mirrorliar Films Season1	Todoroki	Lead role; anthology film	

=== Television ===
Year	Title	Role	Notes	Ref.
2018	Stardust Revengers	Riku Komiyama		
2020	Series: Seishi Yokomizo Short Story Collection II: Kindaichi Kosuke Dances!	Jun Kodama	Episode 1	
2020	The Diary of the 38-Year-Old Divorcee Has Tried a Dating App	Yakusha-kun		
2021	A Man Who Defies the World of BL	Shun		
2022	Avataro Sentai Donbrothers	Hitoshi Hanamura	Episodes 1 and 10	
2022	Cinderella Again	Soma Hasegawa		
2022	The Night I Became a Beast	Wataru Kihara		
2022	Animals	Fuo Nagamine		
2022	Romance 101: Sweet or Bitter?	Yuma Sakurai		
2023	Romance 101	Yuma Sakurai		
2023	Jack o' Frost	Ritsu Okusawa	Lead role	
2023	Tomorrow, I'll Be Someone's Girlfriend	Yuto Maki		
2023	Me, My Husband, and My Husband's Boyfriend	Shuhei Ina	Web series	
2023	Impossible Rationality: Ryoko Uesugi's Analysis	Shiina Takashi	Episodes 9 and 11	
2023	First Shine	Susumu Michio	Lead role; single-episode drama	
2023	The Heroine's Best Friend Has a Hard Schedule	Tatsuya	Web series	
2023–24	Love Advice	Kenji Ryuzaki		
2024	Junkissa Inyoung	Kento Hamura	Web series; episode 2	
2024	Celebrity Boys Are Out of Control	Ritsu Amano		
2024	Dark Girls Talk	Suwa Motoya		
2024	The Tiger and Her Wings	Kosaburo Ōba	Asadora	
2024	In the End, It's Someone Else's Problem	Hayato Takanashi	Episode 4	
2024	Monster	Daiki Takeda	Episode 4	
2024	Chastity High	Ruka Ichinose		
2024–25	Ayaka Is in Love with Hiroko!	Yūya Saitō	2 seasons	
2025	I'm a Cosmetic Surgery Beauty	Kei Sakaguchi	Japanese remake	
2025	Kaze no Fukushima	Takehiro Tabuse		
2025	Spice	Yuki Kitano	Lead role	
2025	Back to the Stories	Natsuki Kinoshita	Short drama	
2025–26	A Calm Sea and Beautiful Days with You	Takimasa Ebata	2 seasons	
2026	Gift	Keijiro Asatani		
2026	Shift: Those Who Collide and Move Forward	Keijiro Asaya	Lead role; spin-off	
2026	Fanfare	TBA	Lead role	

=== Music appearances ===
- "Hitori Omoi" (Lyrics: Nijiiro Samurai Zuma)

== Bibliography ==
=== Magazine ===
- Popteen (2017–2020, Kadokawa Haruki Office) – Men's model

=== Photobook ===
- "Kyoya" (December 25, 2023, Bunyusha) ISBN 978-4-8670-3811-6
- "ECHOES" (scheduled for release on January 31, 2026, Gentosha) ISBN 978-4-3440-4539-2

== Awards and nominations ==
Year presented, name of the award ceremony, category, nominee(s) of the award, and the result of the nomination
Year	Award ceremony	Category	Nominated work(s)	Result	Ref.
2025	124th Television Drama Academy Awards	Best Supporting Actor	A Calm Sea and Beautiful Days with You	Won	
2025	54th Best Dresser Awards	Entertainment / Sports category	Himself	Won	
2026	Modelpress Best Drama Awards	Best Supporting Actor	A Calm Sea and Beautiful Days with You	Won	
