= Ayaka Is in Love with Hiroko! =

Japanese manga series

- Japanese cover for Volume 1

彩香ちゃんは弘子先輩に恋してる (Ayaka-chan wa Hiroko-senpai ni Koishiteru)
- Genre: Romance, yuri
- Manga
- Written by: Sal Jiang
- Published by: Futabasha
- English publisher: NA: MangaPlaza Tokyopop
- Imprint: Action Comics
- Magazine: Web Comic Action
- Original run: June 26, 2020 – March 10, 2023
- Volumes: 3
- Television drama
- Directed by: Nao Nomura (season 1); Yūka Eda (season 2); Yūho Ishibashi (season 2)
- Written by: Ayumi Shimo
- Original network: MBS, TV Kanagawa
- English network: GagaOOLala
- Original run: July 4, 2024 – August 1, 2025
- Episodes: 14
- icon

Ayaka Is in Love with Hiroko! (彩香ちゃんは弘子先輩に恋してる, Ayaka-chan wa Hiroko-senpai ni Koishiteru) is a Japanese manga series written and illustrated by Sal Jiang. It was serialized online via Futabasha's Web Comic Action from June 2020 to March 2023. It was licensed first for an English-language release on NTT Solmare's MangaPlaza website and later for a print release by Tokyopop. A television drama adaptation premiered in July 2024.

== Synopsis ==
Ayaka Usagida, a young office worker, falls madly in love with her senior team leader, Hiroko Kanō. As Ayaka tries to make her attraction known, Hiroko consistently misreads the situation despite being a lesbian herself. However, Ayaka remains undeterred in confessing her feelings.

== Characters ==
Ayaka Toda (兎田彩香, Toda Ayaka)
Portrayed by: Shiho Katō
A young office worker who falls madly in love with her senior, Hiroko Kanō. Ayaka was known as being quite serious and stone-faced at work before she fell for Hiroko, after which she changed her dress style in hopes of catching Hiroko's eye.
Hiroko Kanō (鹿納弘子, Kanō Hiroko)
Portrayed by: Kanna Mori
A senior sales manager who is widely respected within her company. Outside of work Hiroko has a reputation of being womanizer at her local lesbian bar, however she remains closeted due to a past incident at work. She constantly misinterprets Ayaka's advances as either platonic or being directed at her male coworkers.
Risa Komai (狛井理佐, Komai Risa)
Portrayed by: Mio Yūki
A close friend and coworker of Ayaka's. Seeing Ayaka chase after Hiroko makes her realize her own romantic feelings toward Ayaka.
Yūya Saitō (犀藤優也, Saitō Yūya)
Portrayed by: Kyoya Honda
A senior sales staff member, Yūya has worked with Hiroko since they both joined the company. He helps in mentoring new staff such as Ayaka which leads his coworkers to often misinterpret his and Ayaka's professional relationship as romantic.
Ryō Kumagai (熊谷亮, Kumagai Ryō)
Portrayed by: Eiku Yamashita
A junior staff member who also likes Hiroko. He becomes is determined not to lose to Ayaka after she confesses her feelings to Hiroko.
Yumi Kameda (亀田郁実, Kameda Yumi)
Portrayed by: Nonoka Kubo
A senior staff member, she has worked alongside Hiroko and Yūya for several years. She tries to support Ayaka in hopes that she can help heal the negative effects a past work relationship had on Hiroko.
Mama (ママ)
Portrayed by: Kazuya Seto
The owner of a lesbian bar that Hiroko frequents.

== Media ==
=== Manga ===
Written and illustrated by Sal Jiang, Ayaka Is in Love with Hiroko! began serialization online via Futabasha's Web Comic Action from June 26, 2020, to March 10, 2023. The series has been collected in three tankōbon volumes as of March 2023.

The series was first published in English on NTT Solmare's MangaPlaza website and app in 2022, with Tokyopop planning a paperback release in 2026.

No.	Original release date	Original ISBN	English release date	English ISBN
1	September 16, 2021	978-4-575-85641-5	February 17, 2026	978-1-4278-8489-3
2	July 21, 2022	978-4-575-85736-8	April 21, 2026	978-1-4278-8575-3
3	March 16, 2023	978-4-575-85824-2	June 16, 2026	978-1-4278-8580-7

=== Drama ===
A live-action television drama adaptation was announced on June 6, 2024. The series was produced by MBS TV as a part of its "Drama Tokku" programming block and directed by Nao Nomura, with Ayumi Shimo writing the scripts. The series stars Shiho Katō and Kanna Mori in the lead roles. It premiered on MBS TV and TV Kanagawa on July 4, and aired till August 23, 2024. The series was also made available for streaming on GagaOOLala. A second season was announced in April 2025, with most of the cast and staff reprising their roles from the first season. The second season aired on June 26.

==== Awards and nominations of the series ====
Year	Award	Category	Nominee(s)	Result	Ref.
2024	HUB Awards 2024	Highlight of the Year (Japan)	Ayaka Is in Love with Hiroko	Won	

== Reception ==
=== Manga ===
The series was generally well received. Anime Feminist notes while having a happy ending the series still reflects social norms in Japan surrounding office culture, where in Hiroko and Ayaka hide their relationship at work, instead being the "ideal lesbian couple—model employees during their work hours and only explicitly gay after-hours." Erica Friedman of Yuricon gave the series an overall positive review, summarizing that "this is very much a "wackiness ensues" farce of a Shakaijin Yuri manga."

== See also ==
- Black and White: Tough Love at the Office and Wicked Spot, other manga series' by the same author.
