= Kijiya =

Japanese woodworkers

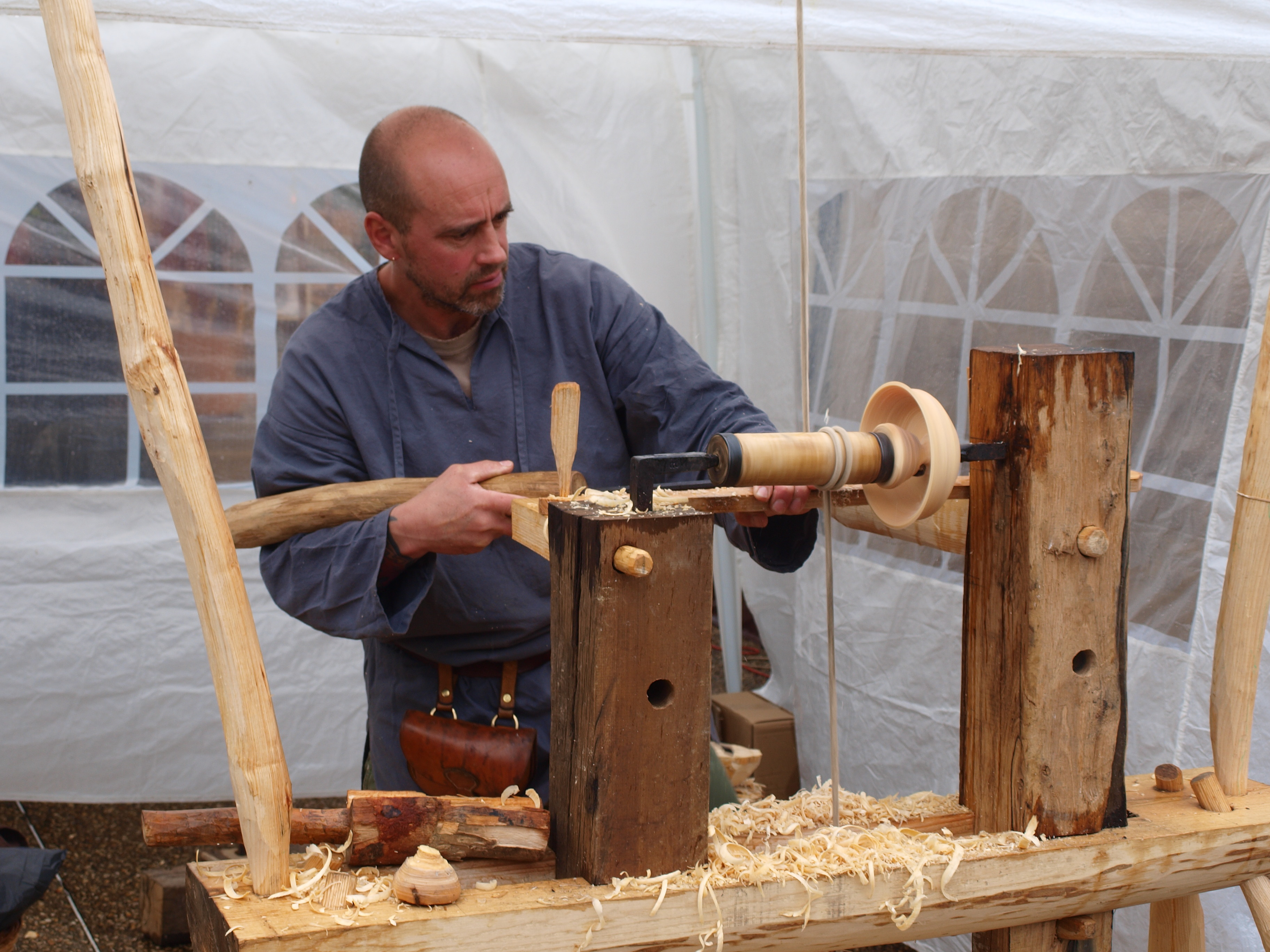
Kijiya

Kijiya (木地屋; lit. woodworker) are Japanese woodworkers particularly known as woodturners for their lathe-produced kokeshi dolls or lacquered goods. They are attested from the medieval period, claiming descent from the oldest son of Emperor Montoku, Prince Koretaka (844–897), whom they credit with the invention of the wood lathe (rokuro). Originally the kijiya occupied the more populous parts of central and southern Japan and are said to originate from a single village, Higashi-Ogura, in Kanzaki District, Shiga Prefecture, leading them to take on the surname, "Ogura". As a migrant minority group they moved about in groups of a few families, collecting wood in the mountains. Contact between these groups was achieved through two shrines, enshrining the legendary princely ancestor. Shrine officials traveled through the country, collecting contributions and handing out licenses for collecting wood and for pursuing their profession. In 1872, 1536 families were managed by one of these shrines. In the course of the Meiji Restoration the kijiya lost the right to collect wood and had to abandon their migratory lifestyle, settling in villages where they worked in furniture or lacquerware producing companies, or became farmers or charcoal makers. As late as 1939, small kijiya communities were reported in Fukushima Prefecture, though it is assumed that only individuals of these groups survive today, mainly in mountains and villages of Tohoku.

== Alternative names ==
Alternative names used to refer to kijiya include: kijishi (木地師; lit. wood specialist), kijikuri (木地くり; lit. wood gouger), rokuroshi (轆轤師; lit. lathe specialist), kijihiki (木地挽き; lit. woodturner), rokurohiki (轆轤挽き; lit. lathe turner), hikimonoshi (挽物師; lit. specialist of turned goods).
