= Yu Miyazaki (actress) =

Japanese actress

- 宮﨑 優
- Born: November 20, 2000 (age 25); Mie Prefecture, Japan
- Occupation: Actress
- Years active: 2018–present

Yu Miyazaki (宮﨑 優, Miyazaki Yu; born November 20, 2000) is a Japanese actress known for her starring role in the Netflix series Glass Heart (2025).

== Career ==
Yu was cast in the Netflix series Glass Heart after a series of auditions attended by lead actor Takeru Satoh who also served as co-executive producer. She learned how to play the drums for two years, and did not have a body double during filming.

== Filmography ==
=== Film ===
Year	Title	Role	Notes	Ref.
2021	A Girl on the Shore	Kanae Shirase		
2022	Lesson in Murder	Akari Kano		
2024	Faceless			
2026	Your Story: Kimi No Hanashi	Kirimoto		

=== Television ===
Year	Title	Role	Notes	Ref.
2022	Renovation Like Magic	Jueru Mano	Episode 9	
2025	Glass Heart	Akane Saijo		
2026	Gift	Sakura Munakata		
