= Beppinsan =

Japanese drama television series

- Original title: べっぴんさん
- Genre: Drama
- Written by: Chiho Watanabe
- Directed by: Yoshirō Nagikawa; Shinzō Nitta; Mojiri Adachi
- Starring: Kyoko Yoshine; Katsuhisa Namase; Miho Kanno; Kengo Kora; Misako Renbutsu; Kento Nagayama; Jun Nagura; Mitsuki Tanimura; Kanako Momota; Kaho Tsuchimura; Manami Igarashi; Yuki Furukawa; Yuki Morinaga; Yoji Tanaka; Yuta Hiraoka; Yuya Matsushita; Hiroki Nakajima; Yusaku Mori; Masatō Ibu; Kyōko Enami; Masachika Ichimura; Tamao Nakamura
- Narrated by: Miho Kanno
- Opening theme: "Hikari no Atelier" (Mr. Children)
- Composer: Hiroko Sebu
- Country of origin: Japan
- Original language: Japanese
- No. of episodes: 151

Production
- Producers: Rinjiro Horiuchi; Kazuki Miki
- Running time: 15 minutes
- Production company: NHK Osaka

Original release
- Network: NHK
- Release: October 3, 2016 – April 1, 2017

Beppin-san (べっぴんさん) is a Japanese television drama series and the 95th asadora series, following Toto Neechan. It was premiered on October 3, 2016, and ended on April 1, 2017.

== Plot ==
Sumire (Kyoko Yoshine) was born as the second child from a wealthy family. She enjoys embroidery and sewing. Whatever Sumire decides to do, she must achieve the goal no matter what.

During World War II, Sumire gets married and becomes pregnant, but her husband is sent off to war. She gives birth to her first daughter. Right before the end of war, the city of Kobe is attacked. Due to the attack, Sumire loses property. While waiting for her husband to return, she begins to make children's clothes.

== Cast ==
- Kyoko Yoshine as Sumire Bando
- Katsuhisa Namase as Isoya Bando
- Miho Kanno as Hana Bando
- Kengo Kora as Kiyoshi Nogami
- Misako Renbutsu as Yuri Nogami
- Kento Nagayama as Norio Bando
- Mitsuki Tanimura as Akemi Ono
- Kanako Momota (from Momoiro Clover Z) as Ryoko Ozawa
- Kaho Tsuchimura as Kimie Murata
- Yūta Hiraoka as Shōichi Murata
- Yuki Furukawa as Kentarō Murata
- Yōko Ishino as Kotoko Murata
- Yuya Matsushita as Eisuke Iwasa
- Jun Nagura as Shōzō Nogami
- Yōji Tanaka as Katsuji Ozawa
- Momiji Yamamura as Setsuko Bando
- Masami Horiuchi as Gorou Tanaka
- Mana Mikura as Shizuko Bando
- Yukari Taki as Etsuko Takanishi
- Keiko Miyata as Kiyo Sato
- Bundō Soganoya as Chuichiro Iguchi
- Charlotte Kate Fox as Amy McGregor
- Masachika Ichimura as Shigeo Asada
- Tamao Nakamura as Tokuko Bando
- Hirotarō Honda as Chotaro Bando
- Hiroki Nakajima as Takeshi Adachi
- Manami Igashira as Sakura Bando
- Yuki Morinaga as Ryuichi Bando
- Masato Ibu as Tamotsu Oshima
- Yusaku Mori as Naomasa Nakanishi
- Tasuku Nagase as Ichiro Saijo
- Kento Hayashi as Jiro Kawai

== Production ==
The theme song of the series is "Hikari no Atelier" by Mr. Children.

Preceded by Toto Neechan	Asadora; October 3, 2016 – April 1, 2017	Succeeded by Hiyokko
