= Kyoko Yoshine =

Japanese actress (born 1997)

Kyōko Yoshine
- 芳根 京子
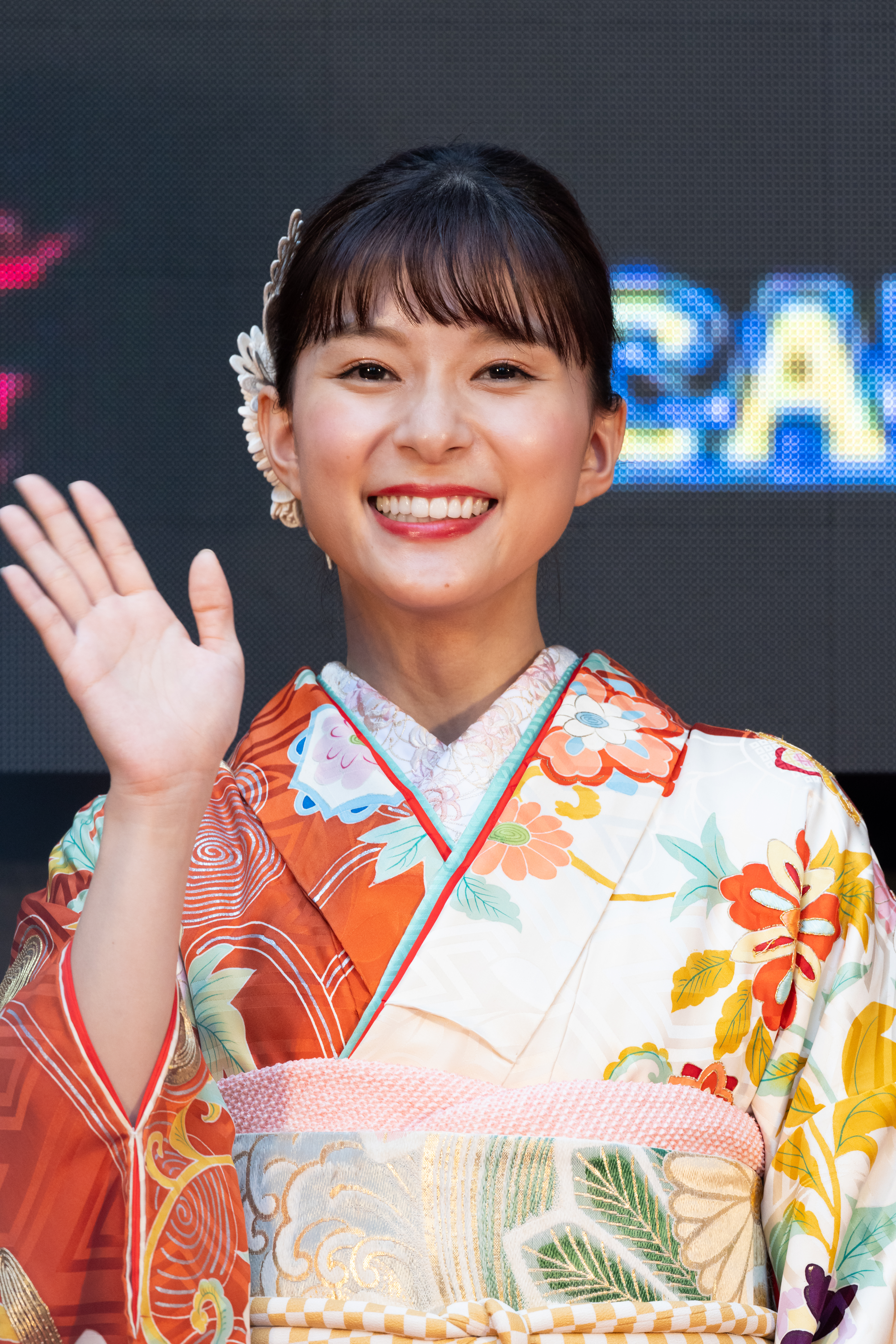
- Yoshine at the 37th Tokyo International Film Festival in October 2024
- Born: 28 February 1997 (age 29); Tokyo, Japan
- Occupation: Actress
- Years active: 2013–present
- Agent: Japan Music Entertainment
- Notable work: A Calm Sea and Beautiful Days with You
- Website: kyokoyoshine.studio.site

Kyōko Yoshine (芳根 京子(よしね きょうこ), Yoshine Kyōko; born February 28, 1997) is a Japanese actress.

== Biography ==
Yoshine was born on February 28, 1997, in Tokyo. Her family consists of mother, father, and an elder brother.

In her second year of junior high school, she developed Guillain-Barré syndrome, which made it difficult for her to attend school for a year, but she later overcame the condition and has since fully recovered.

== Career ==
While attending a concert with a friend during highschool, Yoshine was spotted by a talent scout and entered the entertainment industry.

In 2013, she made her debut as an actress in the Fuji TV drama Last Cinderella. She cites Ryoko Shinohara who was the lead in the drama, as an actress she admires.

In 2014, she was selected through auditions held in Fukushima and Tokyo, and made her first film appearance and first leading role in the film The Piano in the Storeroom. In the same year, she made her debut in the NHK's Asadora drama series Hanako to Anne, portraying the daughter of Hanako's best friend.

In 2015, she appeared in the coming-of-age film The Curtain Rises. In the same year, she was selected from over 1,000 candidates in a casting audition and portrayed her first leading role in the TBS drama Omotesando High School Choir!.

In 2016, She starred in the Asadora drama series Beppinsan. Two years later, in 2018, Yoshine again starred in an Asadora drama series, Princess Jellyfish, as Tsukimi Kurashita.

Also in 2018, she co-starred with Tao Tsuchiya in the film Kasane and Chiri Tsubaki, for which she received much praise and won the Newcomer of the Year Award at the 42nd Japan Academy Film Prize.

== Filmography ==
=== Films ===
| Year | Title | Role | Notes | Ref. |
|---|---|---|---|---|
| 2014 | Monooki no Piano | Haruka Miyamoto | Lead role | |
| 2015 | When the Curtain Rises | Aoi Hakamada | | |
| 2015 | Sunflower on the Hill | Cameo | | |
| 2015 | Senpai to Kanojo | Rika Tsuzuki | | |
| 2016 | 64: Part I | Ayumi Mikami | | |
| 2016 | 64: Part II | Ayumi Mikami | | |
| 2017 | The Anthem of the Heart | Jun Naruse | | |
| 2018 | Samurai's Promise | Misuzu Shinohara | | |
| 2018 | Kasane: Beauty and Fate | Kasane and Nina Tanzawa | Lead role | |
| 2019 | Bento Harassment | Futaba Mochimaru | | |
| 2019 | Iwane: Sword of Serenity | Nao Kobayashi | | |
| 2019 | Seven Days War | Aya Chiyono (voice) | | |
| 2020 | The Memory Eraser | Maki | | |
| 2021 | First Love | Kanna Hijiriyama | | |
| 2021 | The Supporting Actors: The Movie | Herself | | |
| 2021 | Arc | | Lead role | |
| 2022 | The Pass: Last Days of the Samurai | Mustu | | |
| 2024 | Let's Go Karaoke! | Momo Morimoto | | |
| 2024 | Doraemon: Nobita's Earth Symphony | Miina (voice) | | |
| 2025 | Snowflowers: Seeds of Hope | Chiho | | |
| 2025 | Can't Cry with Your Face | Riku Sakahira (Manami Mizumura) | Lead role | |

=== Television dramas ===
| Year | Title | Role | Notes | Ref. |
|---|---|---|---|---|
| 2013 | Last Cinderella | Saki Takenouchi | 1–4 and 6–11 | |
| 2013 | Kamen Teacher | Nanami Komatsu | | |
| 2013 | Hakuba no Ouji-sama Junai Tekireiki | Ryoko Kita | | |
| 2014 | Hanako and Anne | Fujiko Miyamoto | Episode 127; Asadora | |
| 2015 | Detective versus Detectives | Sakura Sasaki | | |
| 2015 | High School Chorus | Makoto Kagawa | Lead role | |
| 2016 | Love That Makes You Cry | Asuka | Episode 9–10 | |
| 2016 | Montage | Miku Odagiri | | |
| 2016–17 | Beppin San | Sumire Bando | Lead role; Asadora | |
| 2017 | Chiisana Kyojin | Yuri Mishima | | |
| 2018 | Innocent Days | | | |
| 2018 | Princess Jellyfish | Tsukimi Kurashita | Lead role | |
| 2019 | Stay Tuned! | Hanako Yukimaru | Lead role | |
| 2019 | Two Weeks | Kaede Tsukishima | | |
| 2020 | The Kotaki brothers' 12 Sufferings | Satsuki Sasaya | | |
| 2020 | Akiko's Pianos | Akiko Kawamoto | Lead role | |
| 2020 | I Had a Dream of That Girl | Herself | | |
| 2021 | Life's Punchline | Natsumi Kishikura | | |
| 2021 | Hankei 5 Metoru | Fumika Maeda | | |
| 2021–22 | Guilty Flag | Mizuho Ninomiya | | |
| 2022 | Is My Kawaii About to Expire? | Izumi Sanada | | |
| 2022 | The Old Dog, New Tricks? | Touko Fukasawa | | |
| 2025 | Brighter Days | Mitsu Fujisawa | | |
| 2025–26 | A Calm Sea and Beautiful Days with You | Natsumi Ebata | Lead role; 2 seasons | |

=== Japanese dub ===
- The Boss Baby (2018, DreamWorks Animation) as Tim Leslie Templeton
- The Boss Baby: Family Business (2021, DreamWorks Animation) as Tabitha Templeton
- Hoppers (2026, Pixar) as Mabel Tanaka

== Awards and nominations ==
| Year | Award | Category | Nominated work(s) | Result | Ref. |
|---|---|---|---|---|---|
| 2019 | 42nd Japan Academy Film Prize | Newcomer of the Year | Kasane and Samurai's Promise | Won | |
| 2026 | 50th Elan d'or Awards | Elan d'or Award | Herself | Won | |
| 2026 | 29th Nikkan Sports Drama Grand Prix | Best Actress | A Calm Sea and Beautiful Days with You | Won | |
