= Wicked Spot =

Japanese manga series

ウィキッドスポット
- Genre: Adventure; Yuri
- Manga
- Written by: Sal Jiang
- Published by: Kadokawa Shoten
- English publisher: NA: Kodansha USA
- Magazine: CandleA
- Original run: October 11, 2024 – present
- Volumes: 1

Wicked Spot (Japanese: ウィキッドスポット) is a Japanese yuri manga written and illustrated by Sal Jiang. It has been serialized in Kadokawa's KadoComi app under the CandleA imprint since October 2024, and is licensed in English by Kodansha USA. The series follows Sadako, an isolated witch who stumbles upon social media and begins using it and interacting with the rest of humanity for the first time.

== Synopsis ==
Sadako, a modern-day witch, grows tired of her secluded life deep in the mountains. After stumbling upon social media for the first time she ignores her teaching of staying hidden from humans and decides to finally start interacting with them online. She quickly gains a huge following and while most are dotting fans, she notices one who seems to have become a dedicated hater, Hanako.

== Publication ==
Written and illustrated by Sal Jiang, Wicked Spot, has been serialized in Kadokawa's KadoComi app under the CandleA imprint since October 11, 2024. It was among the first titles available when CandleA was first launched. The series has been collected in one tankōbon volume as of February 2025.

The series is licensed for an English release in North America by Kodansha USA.

No.	Original release date	Original ISBN	English release date	English ISBN
1	February 7, 2025	9784048114561	May 26, 2026	9781647295721

== See also ==
- Ayaka Is in Love with Hiroko! and Black and White: Tough Love at the Office, other manga series 'by the same author
