= Kokeshi =

Traditional Japanese doll

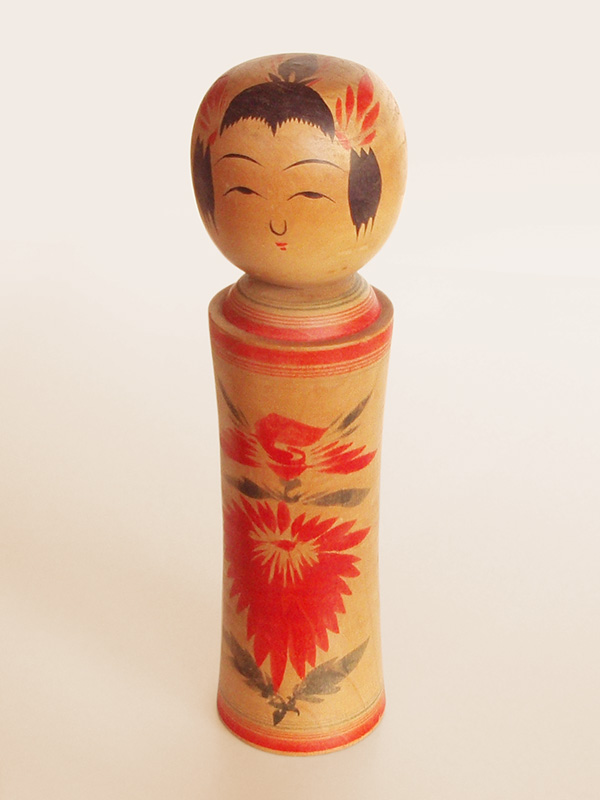
Kokeshi

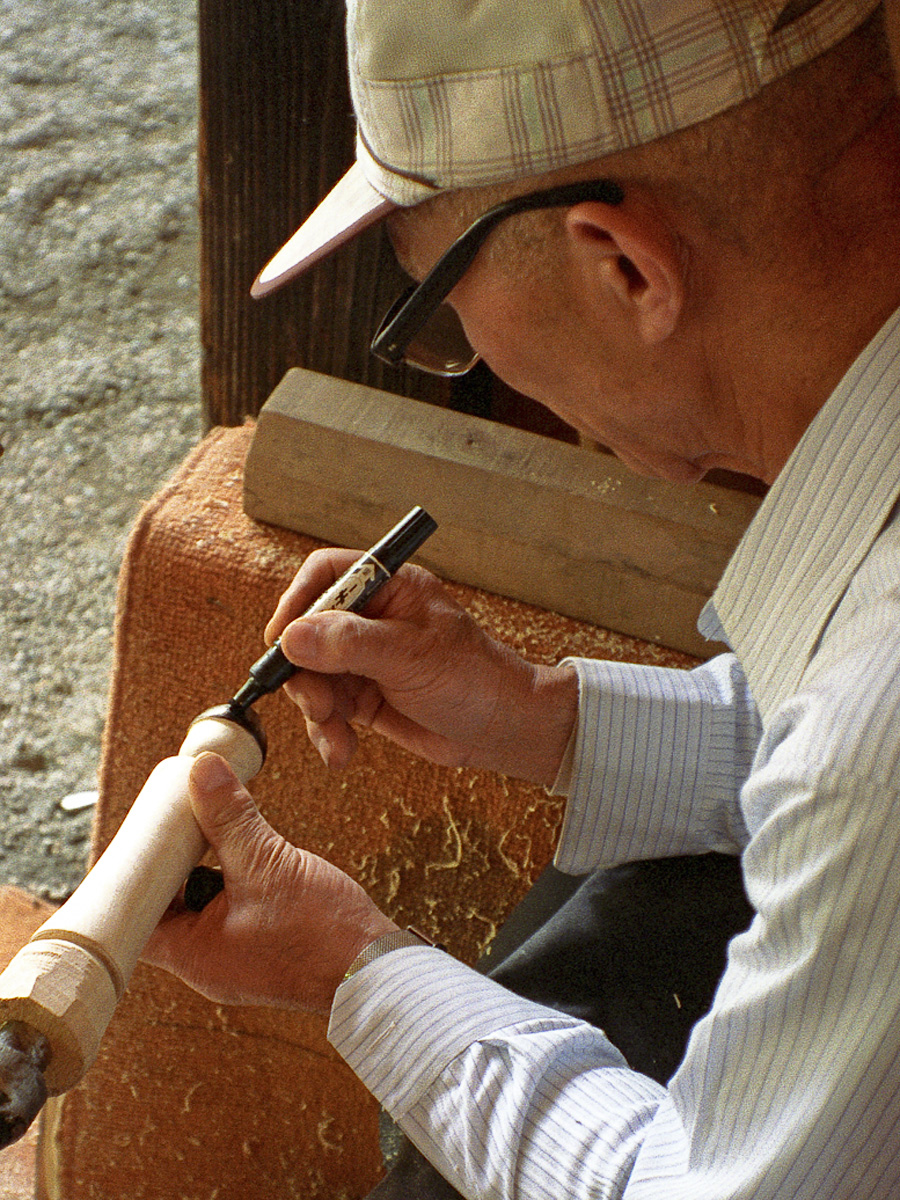
Finishing a kokeshi

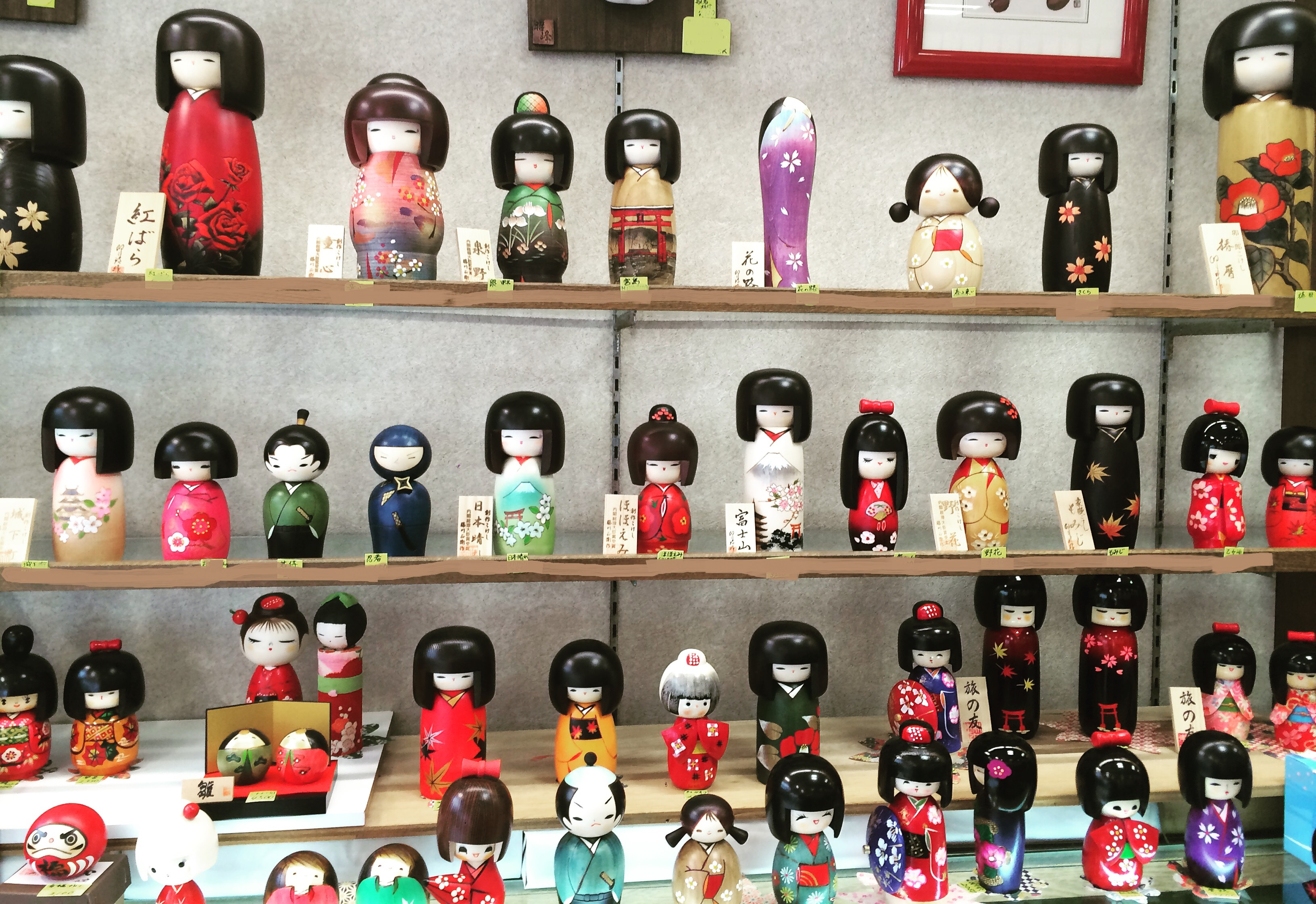
Modern kokeshi

Kokeshi (こけし, 小芥子) are simple wooden Japanese dolls with no arms or legs that have been crafted for more than 150 years as a toy for children. Originally from the Tohoku region in northern Honshu, kokeshi are handmade from wood, having a simple trunk and head with a few thin, painted lines to define the face. The body often has floral and/or ring designs painted in red, black, and sometimes green, purple, blue, or yellow inks, and covered with a layer of wax. Since the 1950s, kokeshi makers have signed their work, usually on the bottom and sometimes on the back.

== History and etymology ==
The origin and naming of kokeshi is unclear, with historical ateji spellings including 小芥子, 木牌子, 木形子, and 木芥子. The hiragana spelling こけし was agreed on at the All-Japan Kokeshi Exhibition (全国こけし大会) at Naruko Onsen in August 1939.

A popular theory suggests that kokeshi may be fetish substitutes for unwanted babies killed after birth and the characters can be understood as 子消し made up of child (子, ko) and erasing, extinguishing (消し, keshi). While infanticide was commonly practiced in Japan until the 20th century, there is little if any evidence to support the theory that kokeshi have anything to do with the practice, with the earliest references in literature dating only from 1965. The word kokeshi itself is originally of the Sendai dialect, with the dolls being known as, for example, deko, kideko, dekoroko; in Fukushima as kibako, kihohoko; in Miyagi as obokko; and in Naruko as hangyo and kiningyō, none of which supports the theory.

Kokeshi were first produced by kijishi (木地師), artisans proficient with a lathe, at the Shinchi Shuraku, near the Tōgatta Onsen in Zaō from where kokeshi-making techniques spread to other spa areas in the Tōhoku region. It is said that these dolls were originally made during the middle of the Edo period (1600–1868) to be sold to people who were visiting the hot springs in the north-east of the country.

One of the earliest doll-focused associations in Japan was the Sendai Kokeshi Association (Sendai Kokeshi-kai) established in 1923 by Mihara Ryōkichi (三原良吉) and Amae Tomiya. The two released a 1928 book about kokeshi, Kokeshi Hōko no Hanashi, which introduced the local tradition to the entire Japan. Mihara continued his work as a journalist and folklorist to his death in 1982, being responsible for popularization of kokeshi and other elements of Sendai folklore.

== Types ==
"Traditional" kokeshi (伝統こけし, dentō-kokeshi) dolls' shapes and patterns are particular to a certain area and are classified under eleven types, shown below. The most dominant type is the Naruko variety originally made in Miyagi Prefecture, which can also be found in Akita, Iwate, and Yamagata Prefectures. The main street of the Naruko Onsen Village is known as Kokeshi Street and has shops which are operated directly by the kokeshi carvers.

"Creative" kokeshi (新型こけし, shingata-kokeshi) allow the artist complete freedom in terms of shape, design and color and were developed after World War II (1945). They are not particular to a specific region of Japan and generally creative kokeshi artists are found in cities.

The woods used for kokeshi vary, with cherry used for its darkness and dogwood for its softer qualities. Itaya-kaede, a Japanese maple, is also used in the creation of both traditional and creative dolls. The wood is left outdoors to season for one to five years before it can be used.

=== Traditional types ===
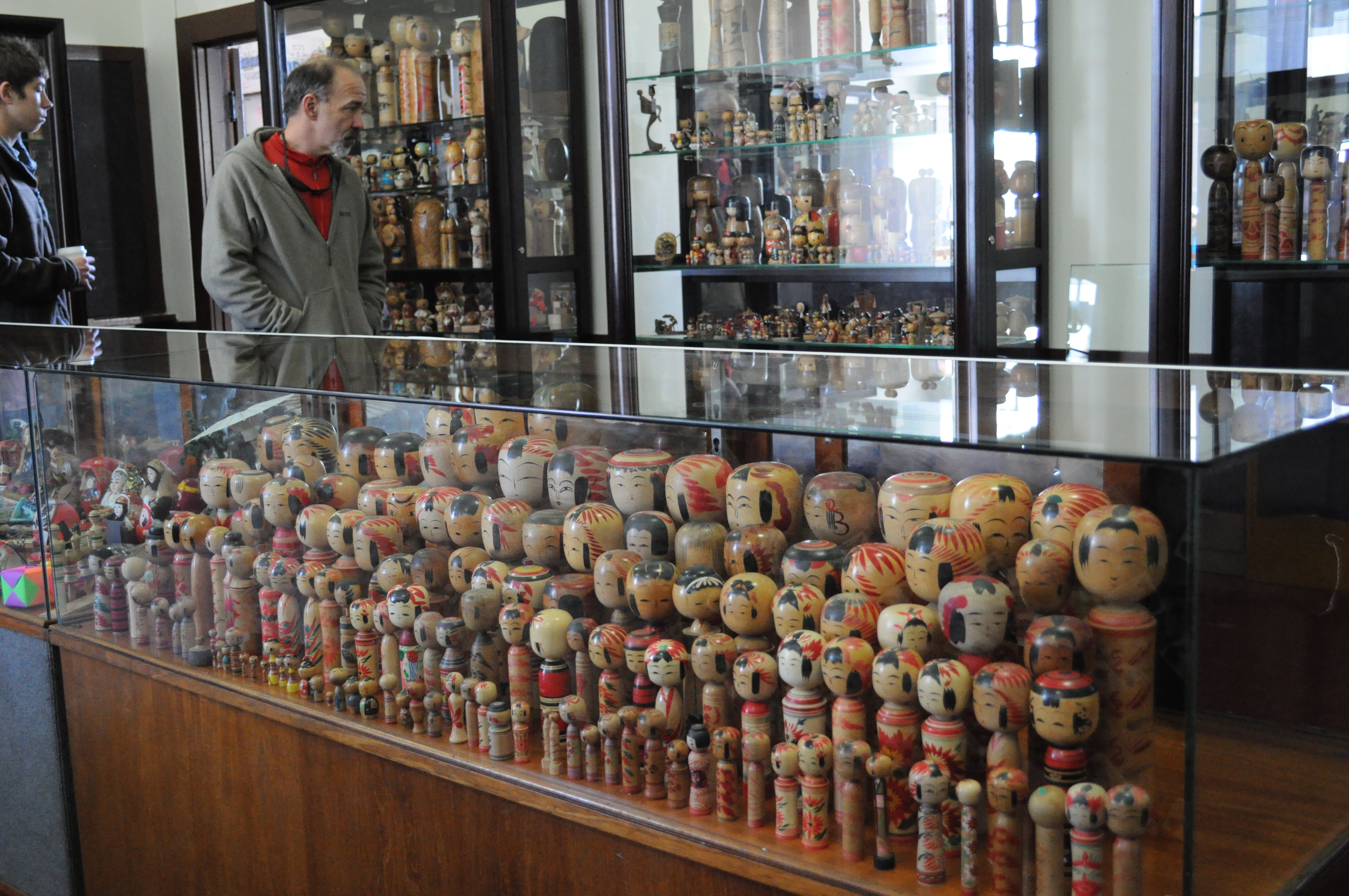
Various kokeshi

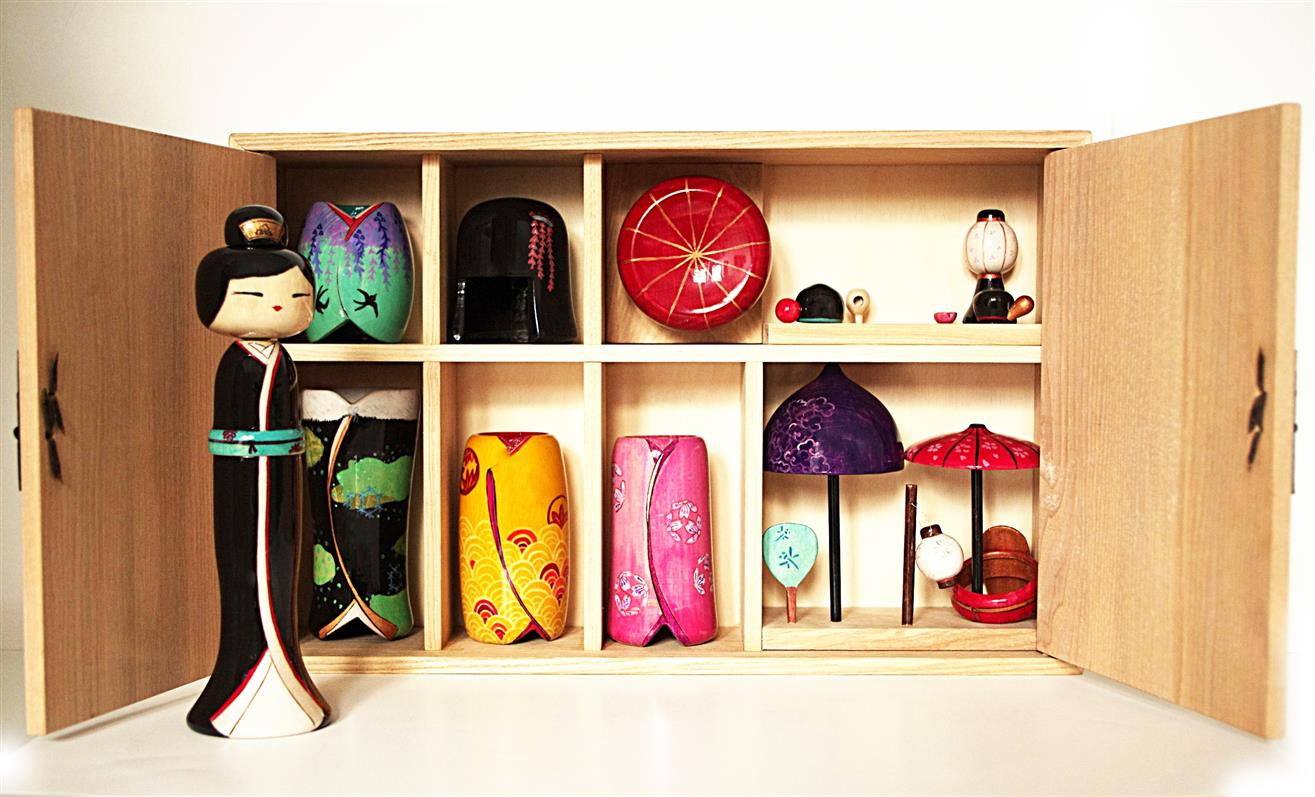
"Dress-up Kokeshi - With a Wardrobe" by Réka Tóth-Vásárhelyi, which won the grand prize at the 58th Japanese National Kokeshi Competition

Traditional types often correspond to a single or multiple onsen located within the Tōhoku region.

- Tsuchiyu (土湯系): Tsuchiyu Onsen (Fukushima), Iizaka Onsen (Fukushima), Dake Onsen (Nihonmatsu)
- Yajirō (弥治郎系): Yajirō (Shiroishi)
- Tōgatta (遠刈田系): Tōgatta Onsen (Zaō)
- Naruko (鳴子系): Naruko Onsen (Ōsaki)
- Sakunami (作並系) or Yamagata-Sakunami (山形作並系): Sendai (incl. Sakunami Onsen), Yamagata, Yonezawa, Sagae, Tendō
- Zaō Takayu (蔵王高湯系): Zaō Onsen (Yamagata)
- Hijiori (肘折系): Hijiori Onsen (Ōkura)
- Kijiyama (木地山系): Kijiyama (Yuzawa)
- Nambu (南部系): Morioka, Hanamaki Onsen (Hanamaki)
- Tsugaru (津軽系) or Nuruyu (温湯系): Nuruyu Onsen (Kuroishi), Ōwani Onsen (Ōwani)

== Exhibitions and competitions ==
Traditionally, the National Kokeshi Exhibition and Competition in Shiroishi-Zao is held every year, and in 2022 it took place for the 64th time. In 2016, Réka Tóth-Vásárhelyi, a Hungarian kokeshi doll maker, won the grand prize with her work Dress-up Kokeshi - With a Wardrobe.

In 2022, the Creative Kokeshi Exhibition in Shibukawa was held for the 28th time. Creative Kokeshi Competition is held regularly in Tokyo, Japan.

== In popular culture ==
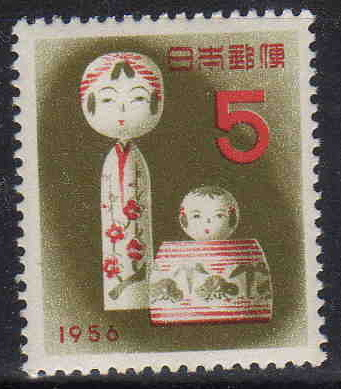
Japanese postage stamp showing kokeshi

Kokeshi dolls have been used as an inspiration for the style of Nintendo's Mii avatars, which are created and customized by players. Their appearance has become the symbol of the platform's overall aesthetic.

Kokeshi dolls are featured as antagonists in the manga As the Gods Will and its 2014 movie adaptation, during the death game variant of Kagome Kagome, in which the students are blindfolded to guess which of four floating Kokeshi dolls is behind them. If they fail, they are killed with a red laser and telekinesis. If the Kokeshi lose, one of them reveals an answer key which opens the doors and frees the students to the next level.

Inspiration for the Momiji Doll originates from the kokeshi doll.

Japanese professional wrestler Tomoaki Honma is nicknamed "Everybody's Kokeshi" (みんなのこけし, minna no kokeshi) after his finishing move "Kokeshi", a diving headbutt where Honma falls straight down towards his opponent while keeping his arms at his sides, resembling a kokeshi in posture.

Miss Grand Japan 2020, Ruri Saji, wore a kokeshi doll-inspired costume which also transforms into an anime robot, showcasing Japan's technological advancement in the robotics field. It has won the Best in National Costume title at the Miss Grand International 2020 held in Bangkok, Thailand.

== See also ==
- Folklore of the Tsugaru region
- Japanese traditional dolls
  - Daruma doll
- Nesting doll
- Roly-poly toy
