= Ken Yasuda =

Ken Yasuda may refer to:

- Ken Yasuda (bodybuilder) (1971–2023), Japanese professional bodybuilder
- Ken Yasuda (actor) (born 1973), Japanese actor
- Kenneth Yasuda (1914–2002), Japanese-American scholar and translator
