= Momiji Dolls =

- Type: Doll
- Company: MomijiHQ Ltd
- Country: United Kingdom
- Materials: resin
- Official website

Momiji [‘mo-mee-jee’] is a brand of collectible, hand-painted dolls inspired by Asian style and contemporary illustration. Each Momiji has a small space in the base to hide a secret message on a blank piece of folded card which is included with the doll. The dolls are a contemporary form of traditional Japanese Kokeshi dolls.

== History ==
Momiji Dolls were originally inspired in 2005 by kokeshi, a variety of wooden doll traditionally made in Northern Japan. These dolls were carved from spare pieces of wood and hand painted. They were usually made by farmers. The dolls typically consist of a head and elongated torso representing the body and legs as a single piece. Momiji dolls are different from the traditional Kokeshi dolls in that they are made from resin and contain a small space in the base. Inside the base is a small folded card for a secret message or greeting. Momiji dolls are often designed by fresh new designers and are known for their work with colleges and art schools worldwide.

== Usage ==
Momiji Dolls, also known as Momiji Friendship Dolls, are typically given to others to show friendship and love. MomijiHQ Limited says: Giving small gifts is part of the culture of Japan and is known as omiyage. In modern times, they have been given as presents for Christmas. The space in the base is often used to pass secret messages between friends.

== See also ==
- Dolls
- Collectibles
