= Momiji Yamamura =

Japanese actress

- 山村 紅葉
- Born: Momiji Yoshikawa; October 27, 1960 (age 65); Kyoto, Kyoto Prefecture, Japan
- Other names: Momi-chan; Momiji-san
- Education: Waseda University
- Occupation: Actress
- Years active: 1983–present
- Agent: Toho Entertainment

Momiji Yamamura (山村 紅葉, Yamamura Momiji; born 27 October 1960) is a Japanese actress. Her real name is Momiji Yoshikawa (吉川 紅葉, Yoshikawa Momiji; née Yamamura (山村)).

Yamamura is represented by Misa Yamamura Office and Toho Entertainment. She is a graduate of Kyoto University of Education Kindergarthen, Elementary School, Junior High, and High School and Waseda University Political Science and Economics. Yamamura's mother was Misa Yamamura and her husband is a former Ministry of Finance bureaucrat. Her uncle is Hiroshi Kimura. Yamamura's hobby is ice skating. Her skills are speaking English, German, and Kyoto words and playing the piano. Yamamura is nicknamed Momi-chan (もみちゃん) and Momiji-san (紅葉さん).

== Filmography ==
=== TV drama ===
Year	Title	Role	Notes	Ref.
2016	Beppinsan	Setsuko Bando	Asadora	
2018	Black Pean	Taeko Minagawa	Episode 1	
2023	Ōoku: The Inner Chambers	Tsuchimikado Fujiko		
2025	Unbound	Shige	Taiga drama	

=== Films ===
Year	Title	Role	Notes	Ref.
2020	The Devil Wears Jūnihitoe			
2022	Akira and Akira			
2023	Fly Me to the Saitama: From Biwa Lake with Love			
2026	This Is I		Cameo	

=== Anime ===
Year	Title	Role	Ref.
2016	Sazae-san	Meiwaku Obasan	

=== Radio ===
Year	Title	Notes	Ref.
2016	Nadeshiko desu kara		

=== Dubbing ===
- Murder on the Orient Express, Princess Dragomiroff (Judi Dench)

== Bibliography ==
=== Books ===
Year	Title
2001	Okibariyasu: Kyo On'na wa Kyō mo Isshōkenmei
2005	Honmamon no Kyoto Miyage 100: Momiji Yamamura ga Gensen!
2015	Let's Visit Kyoto's Mystery Sites Together
