= Tomoya Nishino =

Japanese film producer (born 1987)

- 西野 智也
- Born: 1987; Tokyo, Japan
- Occupation: Film producer
- Years active: 2011–present
- Employer: Toho

Tomoya Nishino (西野 智也, Nishino Tomoya; born 1987) is a Japanese film producer who has produced eight films since his career began in 2011.

== Life and career ==
Nishino was born in 1987 in Tokyo, Japan. During his childhood, he watched Ultraman via his mother recording a rebroadcast of the series on VHS. Nishino said that the series "sparked my interest in film". During his years at elementary school, Nishino's father hired Michael Bay's The Rock, which inspired him to enter the film industry. Shin Ultraman director Shinji Higuchi stated that Nishino wrote a "thesis in college on Tohl Narita, who originally designed Ultraman and the Kaiju of the original series."

In 2011, he began his career in film and television after joining Toho. That year, his first film as a producer, Paternal Womb, was released. Two years later, while working in advertising at Tokai and Hokuriku, he was transferred to the planning division of Toho and worked on the television series Hard Nuts!. He has since worked as a producer on Toho's My Tomorrow, Your Yesterday, Spark, Killing for the Prosecution, It Comes, Fortuna's Eye, Brave: Gunjyo Senki, Shin Ultraman, and The Floor Plan.

== Filmography ==
=== Film ===
Year	Film	Producer	Notes	Ref(s)
2011	Paternal Womb	Yes		
2016	My Tomorrow, Your Yesterday	Yes	With Naohiro Kawada	
2017	Spark	Yes	With Susumu Torisawa	
2018	Killing for the Prosecution	Yes	With Yoshihiro Sato	
2018	It Comes	Yes	With Maki Kanehira	
2019	Fortuna's Eye	Yes	With Naohiro Kawada	
2021	Brave: Gunjyo Senki	Yes	With Yoshihiro Sato; Naohiro Kawada	
2022	Shin Ultraman	Yes	With Hideaki Anno, Kazutoshi Wadakura, Takehiko Aoki, and Masaki Kawashima (Note: While five of the film's staff have been credited as producers, Nishino said in his interview at the 2022 New York Asian Film Festival that he was one of the film's "three main producers".)	
2024	The Floor Plan	Yes	With Sora Kobayashi	

=== Television ===
Year	Series	Producer	Notes	Ref(s)
2013	Hard Nuts!	Yes		
