= Shin Japan Heroes Universe =

Japanese collaborative project

- Official logo
- Created by: Hideaki Anno; Shinji Higuchi
- Owners: Toho; Khara; Tsuburaya Productions; Toei
- Years: 2007–present

Films and television
- Film(s): Shin Godzilla (2016); Evangelion: 3.0+1.0 Thrice Upon a Time (2021); Shin Ultraman (2022); Shin Kamen Rider (2023)

Games
- Video game(s): P Godzilla vs. Evangelion: G Cell Awakening (2022)

Official website
- Official website (in Japanese)

The Shin Japan Heroes Universe (シン・ジャパン・ヒーローズ・ユニバース, Shin Japan Hirōzu Yunibāsu; abbreviated as SJHU) is a Japanese collaborative project media franchise between Toho, Khara, Tsuburaya Productions, and Toei. Developed by filmmaker Hideaki Anno, the project is intended for merchandise, special events, and tie-ins. It unites films that Anno had worked on that bear the katakana title "Shin" (シン). (Note: The katakana for "Shin" was chosen by Anno as it can either stand for "new" (新), "true" (真), or "God" (神).)

== History ==
=== Development ===
"No, we don't have any plans for it. It's all we can do to make one movie for one character right now."

— Shinji Higuchi (co-director/effects director of Shin Godzilla and director of Shin Ultraman) after being asked if there are plans to expand SJHU into crossover films.

In 2021, Toho, Khara, Tsuburaya Productions, and Toei held a meeting and unanimously agreed to create the Shin Japan Heroes Universe, with the assistance of Hideaki Anno. Regarding the fruition of the project, Anno stated that it "was conceived in the discussions of the related companies, from the idea of combining characters that are proud of Japanese culture, in a collaborative way, to further expand them around the world and stimulate fun. [...] Originally, projects with a wide range of copyright sources are difficult to adjust, and the commercial benefits are not significant. So it's a plan that can only be made by content holders who prioritize fan service over business cooperation itself." Back in 2016, Khara and Toho had previously collaborated on similar cross-over projects uniting Rebuild of Evangelion and Shin Godzilla such as Godzilla vs. Evangelion and Godzilla vs. Evangelion: The Real 4D.

On February 14, 2022, all four companies jointly announced that the collaborative project unites properties that Anno had worked on bearing the title "Shin", such as Shin Godzilla, Evangelion: 3.0+1.0 Thrice Upon a Time, (Note: Known in Japan as Shin Evangelion Theatrical Edition (シン・エヴァンゲリオン劇場版𝄇, Shin Evangerion Gekijōban 𝄇). It is the only film in the Rebuild of Evangelion series to use the same katakana for "Shin" (シン・) also used in Shin Godzilla, Shin Ultraman, and Shin Kamen Rider.) Shin Ultraman and Shin Kamen Rider; the project is intended only for merchandise, special events, and tie-in events. That same day, the official logo by Yutaka Izubuchi and the promotional visual teaser image by Mahiro Maeda were revealed. The ensuing day, Anno announced that "it is a project that uses a common item called Shin as an expedient. In the future, the word Shin will be removed...we hope that the development of SJHU will please our fans as a new pleasure that transcends the boundaries of the character(s) worlds."

In July 2022, Shinji Higuchi iterated, in an interview with Looper, that there are no plans for cross-over films and would not be interested in such projects. Looper elaborated that while the films share "intertextual references", they are standalone features with no indication of being canon with one another or being part of a shared universe. They also pointed out that each series is owned by rival studios, rendering a potential crossover difficult.

=== Projects ===
In May 2022, Bandai Namco Holdings announced the first SJHU project titled Shin Japan Heroes Amusement World, an amusement park set to debut for opening between July and November 2022 in the Bandai Namco Cross Stores located in Yokohama, Osaka, Umeda and Hakata. In July of the same year, GungHo Online Entertainment added the Shin Godzilla incarnation of Godzilla and the Shin Ultraman incarnations of Ultraman, Neronga, Gabora, Zarab, Mefilas, and Zetton to their mobile puzzle video game Puzzle & Dragons. In October, a pachinko game titled Godzilla vs. Evangelion: G Cells Awakening was announced, which features an Evangelion mutating into Godzilla. That following month, a Shin Japan Heroes Amusement World commemorative wristwatch was announced and became available for pre-order from Premium Bandai on November 25 for ¥33,000. That same month, Tamashii Nations announced a new line of figures based on the designs of Eva-01, Godzilla, Kamen Rider and Ultraman.

In January 2023, two SJHU products were announced: snack food company Befco announced a special campaign promoting an SJHU-themed bakauke pack and Uniqlo announced a new line of T-shirts for March 2023. In March, an izakaya inspired by Evangelion: 3.0+1.0 Thrice Upon a Time and Shin Kamen Rider opened in Tokyo's Kabukicho district from March 10 to May 28. The ensuing month, the video game SD Shin Kamen Rider Rumble, featuring a season pass with three DLC packs was revealed. In May, Bandai Toy Division released "S.J.H.U.PROJECT Shin Universe Robo," a toy consisting of the title characters from each film at the price of ¥23.100. Hiroshi Butsuda directed a promotional video featuring the "Shin Universe Robo", released the same month, which a mecha formed by the combination of Godzilla, Ultraman, Evangelion Unit-01 and Kamen Rider No. 1's motorcycle, the Cyclone.

== See also ==
- Compati Hero
- Monsterverse
- Rebuild of Evangelion
- Ultraman vs. Kamen Rider
