= Katsuro Onoue =

Japanese special effects director

Katsurō Onoue
- 尾上 克郎
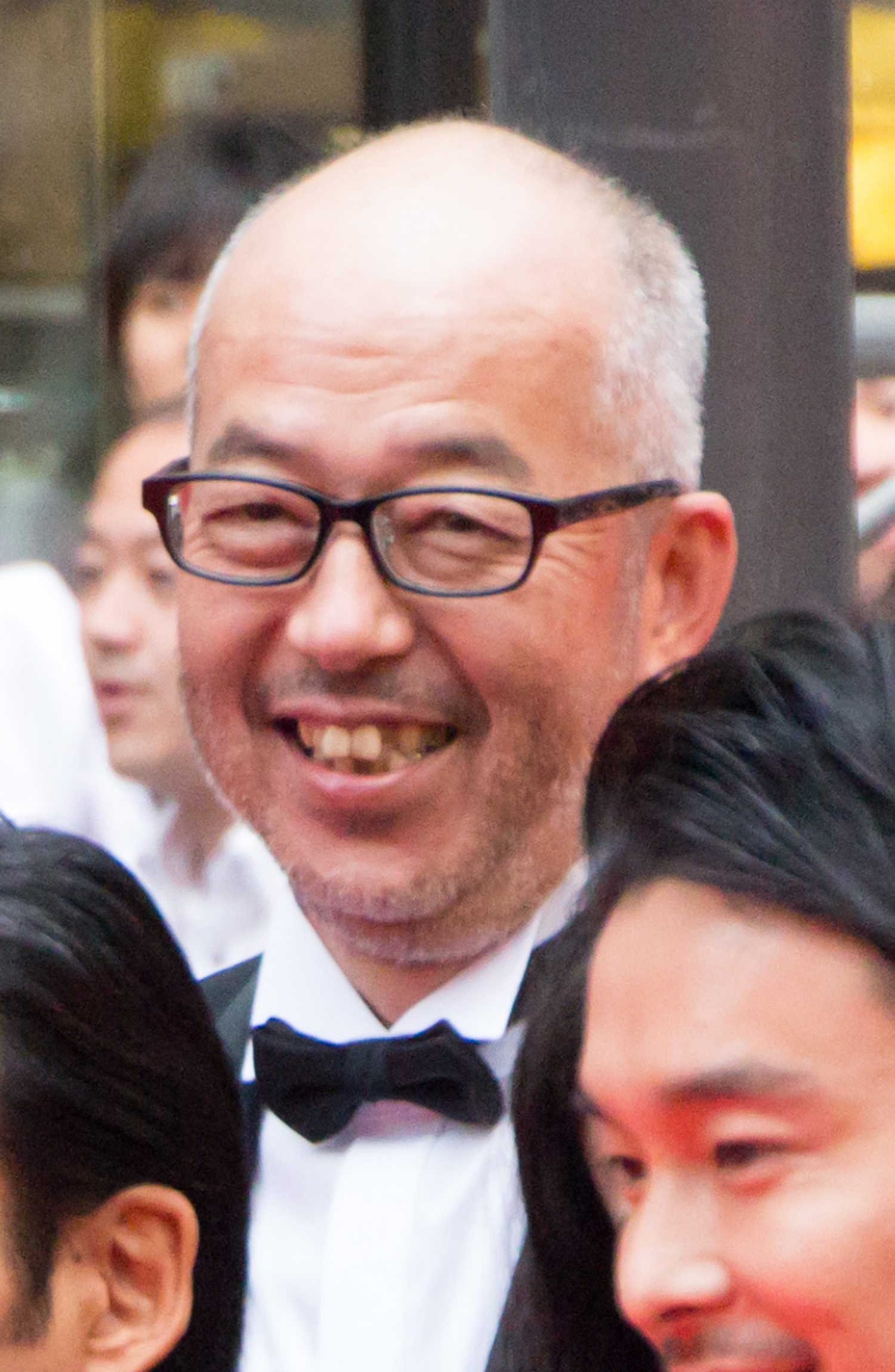
- Onoue at the premiere of Shin Godzilla in 2016
- Born: June 4, 1960 (age 64); Kagoshima, Japan
- Occupations: Special effects director; visual effects supervisor; associate director; cinematographer
- Years active: 1982–present

Katsurō Onoue (尾上 克郎, Onoue Katsurō, born June 4, 1960) is a Japanese special effects director and visual effects supervisor.

== Life and career ==
Onoue was born in 1960 in Kagoshima, Japan. He went to high school in Saga, Kyushu, Japan, and moved to Tokyo upon entering university.

When he was a student, Onoue became involved in independent films, and started working part-time at Taiko Shokai, a company that handles props for television shows. He began his career working on art in 1982's Burst City. Since then, he has been working in art and special effects departments, focusing on movies and concerts.

In 1985, he became an employee Special Effects Laboratory and became an important figure at the company after working on Jikuu Senshi Spielban and Choujinki Metalder in 1987. He made his debut as a special effects director on 1994's Blue SWAT. Since then he has worked on many blockbusters, including: Onmyōji (2001), Samurai Commando: Mission 1549 (2005), Sinking of Japan (2006), Saiyūki (2007), Hidden Fortress: The Last Princess (2008), Oba: The Last Samurai (2011), The Floating Castle (2012), Attack on Titan (2015), Persona Non Grata (2015), Shin Godzilla (2016), Moribito: Guardian of the Spirit (2017), Idaten: Tokyo Orinpikku-banashi (2019), and Shin Ultraman (2022).

== Filmography ==
=== Film ===
- Burst City (1982)
- Onmyōji (2001)
- Returner (2002)
- Onmyōji II (2003)
- Cutie Honey (2004)
- Nin x Nin: Ninja Hattori-kun, the Movie (2004)
- Samurai Commando: Mission 1549 (2005)
- Sinking of Japan (2006)
- Saiyūki (2007)
- Hidden Fortress: The Last Princess (2008)
- Oba: The Last Samurai (2011)
- Giant God Warrior Appears in Tokyo (2012)
- The Floating Castle (2012)
- Attack on Titan (2015)
- Persona Non Grata (2015)
- Shin Godzilla (2016)
- Moribito: Guardian of the Spirit (2017)
- Idaten: Tokyo Orinpikku-banashi (2019)
- Ultraman Taiga The Movie (2020)
- Shin Ultraman (2022) - associate director and cinematographer
- Instigator: Umeyasu Fujieda (2023) - senior VFX supervisor
- Shin Kamen Rider (2023) - associate director
- Instigator: Umeyasu Fujieda 2 (2023) - senior VFX supervisor

=== Television ===
- ikuu Senshi Spielban (1986-1987)
- Choujinki Metalder (1987-1988)
- Blue SWAT (1994-1995)
