= Shin Kamen Rider (film) =

2023 Japanese film by Hideaki Anno

- Theatrical release poster

Japanese name
- Katakana: シン・仮面ライダー
Transcriptions
- Revised Hepburn: Shin Kamen Raidā
- Directed by: Hideaki Anno
- Written by: Hideaki Anno
- Based on: Characters by Shotaro Ishinomori
- Produced by: Daiki Koide; Kazutoshi Wadakura
- Starring: Sousuke Ikematsu; Minami Hamabe; Tasuku Emoto; Nanase Nishino; Shinya Tsukamoto; Toru Tezuka; Suzuki Matsuo; Mirai Moriyama
- Cinematography: Osamu Ichikawa; Keizō Suzuki
- Edited by: Emi Tsujita
- Music by: Taku Iwasaki
- Production companies: Toei Company; Cine Bazar; Shin Kamen Rider Film Partners; Ishimori Production; Khara
- Distributed by: Toei Company
- Release date: March 17, 2023
- Running time: 121 minutes
- Country: Japan
- Language: Japanese
- Box office: $16.02 million

Shin Kamen Rider (シン・仮面ライダー, Shin Kamen Raidā) (Note: The katakana for Shin in the film's title has a variety of meanings, including "new" (新), "true" (真), and "God" (神). Also known as Shin Masked Rider.) is a 2023 Japanese superhero film directed and written by Hideaki Anno. Produced to celebrate the 50th anniversary of Kamen Rider, it is Anno's third reimagining of a tokusatsu series, following Shin Godzilla (2016) and Shin Ultraman (2022), and the first without his frequent collaborator Shinji Higuchi. The film stars Sosuke Ikematsu, Minami Hamabe, Tasuku Emoto, Nanase Nishino, Shinya Tsukamoto, Toru Tezuka, Suzuki Matsuo, and Mirai Moriyama. In the film, a man and his female cohort attempt to annihilate the illegal organization responsible for his conversion into a mutant cyborg and stop their plans to conquer society.

Anno first proposed the project after becoming close with Toei producer Muneyuki Kii during the production of Evangelion: 3.0 You Can (Not) Redo (2012). Toei initially aimed for the film to be released in 2021, however, the COVID-19 pandemic delayed its production. Principal photography began on October 3, 2021, and wrapped at the end of January 2022.

Shin Kamen Rider premiered in selected Japanese theaters on March 17, 2023, and was released nationwide the next day, by Toei. The film received mostly positive reviews from critics and grossed $16.02 million, making it the most commercially successful Kamen Rider film. Fathom Events later released it in the United States on May 31, 2023. It began streaming on Amazon Prime Video in over 200 locations worldwide on July 21, 2023, as Shin Masked Rider. Hamabe won Best Supporting Actress at the 66th Blue Ribbon Awards for her performances in the film and the kaiju epic Godzilla Minus One, and she was also nominated for Best Supporting Actress at the 47th Japan Academy Film Prize.

== Plot ==
Motorcyclist Takeshi Hongo is kidnapped by the Sustainable Happiness Organization with Computational Knowledge Embedded Remodeling (SHOCKER), a sinister organization that transforms humans into brainwashed synthetic animal hybrids known as Augments, or Augs. Hongo is transformed into Grasshopper-Aug 01 but is set free by Ruriko Midorikawa, a former SHOCKER member, before he is brainwashed. SHOCKER sends one of its executive agents, Spider-Aug, to retrieve them and briefly captures Ruriko but is saved by Hongo in his augmented suit.

They retreat to a safe house where they rendezvous with Ruriko's father, Dr. Hiroshi Midorikawa. He reveals that Hongo is his masterpiece Augment to defeat the organization and chose him because Hongo wished for power after his father, a policeman, was killed by a suspect he was trying to arrest; he also explains that the life source prana allows Hongo to harness superhuman strength. They are discovered by Spider-Aug, who kills Dr. Midorikawa and kidnaps Ruriko again, only to be thwarted. After processing recent events, Hongo vows to use his powers for good and abandons the title of Grasshopper-Aug, dubbing himself "Kamen Rider." Ruriko is untrusting of Hongo but cedes to relying on his abilities.

Later, two unnamed government agents approach Hongo and Ruriko and convince them to form an alliance to take down SHOCKER in exchange for intel on the groups' activities. Ruriko reveals that SHOCKER is a secret society originally created by a billionaire with the goal of leading humanity to happiness. However, the billionaire committed suicide and left SHOCKER in the hands of an artificial intelligence that misinterpreted its creator's will, believing that mankind's salvation lied in its subjugation.

At the request of the government, Hongo and Ruriko defeat several Augs, including Ruriko's friend Hiromi, who was turned into the Wasp-Aug. When Hongo refuses to kill her, Wasp-Aug is shot by one of the unnamed agents using the Scorpion-Aug's venom. Later, Ruriko's brother, Ichiro, awakens as the Butterfly-Aug before she has a chance to complete a code that could suppress him. Ichiro kills several government agents by sending their souls to a hellish dimension called the Habitat Realm. Ruriko reveals that he intends to do the same to mankind because his mother was murdered randomly, an incident that made Ichiro outraged with humanity.

Hongo and Ruriko attempt to confront Ichiro, but are subdued, and Hongo is confronted by SHOCKER recruit Hayato Ichimonji, turned into Grasshopper-Aug 02. Hongo escapes with Ruriko but is maimed by Ichimonji; however, Ruriko succeeds in liberating Ichimonji from SHOCKER's brainwashing. Not long after, Ruriko is killed by the K.K.-Aug, who is soon killed by Ichimonji.

After recovering, Hongo views Ruriko's last will via his helmet; she reveals that she lost to Ichiro because his prana outmatched hers, that she transferred a code into Hongo's helmet that would neutralize Ichiro, and confides that her time with Hongo truly made her happy. After Hongo mourns her death, he fails to convince Ichimonji to work with him against SHOCKER and asks the two unnamed agents for a favor before confronting Ichiro.

Hongo is ambushed by a squadron of Grasshopper-Augs but is saved by Ichimonji, who dubs himself "Kamen Rider No. 2," and the two cooperate to defeat the Augs. When they confront Ichiro, he transforms into his complete form, Kamen Rider No.0, who proves to be powerful despite Hongo and Ichimonji destroying his source of prana. The duo succeed in removing Ichiro's helmet and replacing it with Hongo's, where Ichiro interacts with Ruriko's soul and the two reconcile. Having exerted their prana, both Ichiro and Hongo die.

Later, the two government agents honor Hongo's favor by bequeathing his helmet to Ichimonji, and reveal that they have secured Ruriko's soul to a safe location, and that Hongo wanted Ichimonji to carry on the name of "Kamen Rider" and defeat SHOCKER. On behalf of Hongo and Ruriko, Ichimonji agrees to work with the two agents, who identify themselves as Tachibana and Taki. With a new suit and a refurbished version of Hongo's helmet, Ichimonji interacts with Hongo, who transferred his soul into the helmet; and the two of them, now known as "Kamen Rider No. 2+1," ride on into the sunset.

== Cast ==
- Sosuke Ikematsu as Takeshi Hongo, a brilliant-yet-introverted college graduate and motorcyclist who is abducted by SHOCKER and transformed into the Synthetic Insect-Hybrid Augment Grasshopper-Aug 01. As he escapes from his captors, Takeshi re-dubbed himself as the Kamen Rider (retroactively referred to as "Kamen Rider No. 1") and pledges to wage a war against SHOCKER.
- Minami Hamabe as Ruriko Midorikawa, a female computational organism who defected from SHOCKER and aids Hongo in his war against the organization.
- Tasuku Emoto as Hayato Ichimonji, a photojournalist who SHOCKER transformed into Grasshopper-Aug 02. Initially, he was a brainwashed soldier before he was freed from their thrall, Hayato re-dubbed himself as Kamen Rider No. 2 and joined Takeshi in their war against SHOCKER.
- Nanase Nishino as Hiromi, a senior member of SHOCKER and childhood friend of Ruriko who can transform into Wasp-Aug
- Shinya Tsukamoto as Dr. Hiroshi Midorikawa, Ruriko's and Ichiro's father
- Toru Tezuka as Bat-Aug, (Note: In the spin-off manga, Nulla in mundo pax sincera: Shin Kamen Rider SHOCKER Side, the real names of Bat-Aug, Spider-Aug, Scorpion-Aug, Ichiro Midorikawa's mother, and the founder of SHOCKER are revealed to be Tadano, Masa, Shiori, Shoko Midorikawa, and Daizo Ishigami, respectively.) a Non-human Infused Augment and Biochemical Research Chief of SHOCKER
- Kanata Hongō as K.K.-Aug, a Mantis/Chameleon-themed Tri-species Synthetic Hybrid Augment of SHOCKER's "Angels of Death Group"
- Nao Ōmori as the voice of Spider-Aug, a Non-human Infused Augment senior member of SHOCKER
- Masami Nagasawa as Scorpion-Aug, a senior member of SHOCKER
- Tori Matsuzaka as the voice of K, SHOCKER's autonomous AI
- Mikako Ichikawa as Ichiro Midorikawa's mother, the late matriarch of the Midorikawa family
- Tōru Nakamura as Takeshi Hongo's father
- Ken Yasuda as the man who killed Takeshi Hongo's father
- Shūhei Uesugi as the man in business suit, Hiromi's second-in-command
- Suzuki Matsuo as the founder of SHOCKER, a mysterious billionaire who created the SHOCKER A.I.s before he committed suicide for unknown reasons
- Takumi Saitoh as an intelligence official. He called himself "Taki"
- Yutaka Takenouchi as a government official. He called himself "Tachibana"
- Mirai Moriyama as Ichiro Midorikawa, Dr. Midorikawa's son, Ruriko's elder brother, and a high-ranking member of SHOCKER who can transform into the ultimate augment Butterfly-Aug, before he re-dubbed himself as Kamen Rider No.0. His backstory is told in the spin-off manga, Nulla in mundo pax sincera: Shin Kamen Rider SHOCKER Side

=== Crew ===
- Hideaki Anno – director, writer, and concept designer
- Katsuro Onoue – associate director
- Ikki Todoroki – deputy director
- Shinichirō Shirakura – executive producer
- Yutaka Izubuchi – designer
- Mahiro Maeda – designer
- Ikuto Yamashita – designer
- Atsuki Sato – VFX supervisor
- Hiromasa Inoue – VFX producer
- Masayo Ohno – VFX producer
- Linto Ueda – post-production supervisor

== Production ==
=== Development ===
Hideaki Anno first proposed Shin Kamen Rider after growing close with Toei Company producer Muneyuki Kii during the production of his 2012 film Evangelion: 3.0 You Can (Not) Redo. Planning for the film began in 2015 with Anno as director and screenwriter. Toei initially aimed for release in 2021, the year of the Kamen Rider franchise's 50th anniversary; however, production was delayed due to the outbreak of the COVID-19 pandemic.

The film was announced in a press conference on April 3, 2021, the 50th anniversary of the franchise's very first episode. Anno, who grew up with the original 1971 Kamen Rider series, expressed his admiration for the franchise, calling it "epoch-making" and expressing a desire to "give back in some small way". Executive producer Shinichirō Shirakura revealed the teaser poster, illustrated by Mahiro Maeda, as well as plans for a Japanese release in March 2023.

In September 2021, the film's official Twitter account announced the script had been finalized, and shooting was soon to begin. On October 10, the film's official Twitter account revealed that Hayato Ichimonji/Kamen Rider 2 would appear in the film. On January 1, 2022, it was revealed that Tasuku Emoto would play the role.

=== Design ===
The film's version of Kamen Rider was designed by Anno, Maeda, and Ikuto Yamashita. A number of approaches to modernizing the design were considered, but the designers felt they steered too close to previous reimaginings such as Kamen Rider: The First and Kamen Rider Black. It was ultimately decided to go "back to basics," retaining the overall design of the original 1971 suit with only subtle alterations.

Yamashita also designed the film's incarnation of the Cyclone, Kamen Rider's motorcycle. Use of a fully computer-generated bike was proposed, but ultimately rejected due to concerns over budget and screentime. The designer realized it would be impossible to faithfully recreate the original Cyclone's silhouette with a modern bike; As such, production focused on finding a practical vehicle suited for the film's action sequences, which then served as the base for Yamashita's design.

Yutaka Izubuchi, a veteran designer who worked on the previous film reboot, Kamen Rider: The First, designed the Spider-Aug, the film's incarnation of Spider Man.

=== Filming ===
Principal photography began on October 3, 2021. While the film's official Twitter account proclaimed filming wrapped in late 2021, Anno stated that he completed filming at the end of January 2022 in Shin Ultraman Design Works.

Like Shin Ultraman, several sequences in the film were shot on iPhones, using camera movements, lens sizes, angles, and zoom timing to mimic modern cinematic techniques.

=== Visual effects ===
Visual effects for the film were created by Shirogumi.

== Release ==
=== Marketing ===
The first teaser was revealed at a press conference on September 30, along with the casting of leads Ikematsu and Hamabe. The teaser is a faithful recreation of the original series' opening title sequence, and revealed the designs of Kamen Rider, his Cyclone motorcycle and the iconic villain Spider Man. In February 2022, Toho, Khara, Toei, and Tsuburaya Productions announced a collaborative project titled "Shin Japan Heroes Universe" for merchandise, special events and tie-ins. The project unites films that Anno had worked on that bear the katakana title "Shin" (シン・), such as Shin Godzilla (2016), Evangelion: 3.0+1.0 Thrice Upon a Time (2021), (Note: Known in Japan as Shin Evangelion Theatrical Edition; it is the only film in the Rebuild of Evangelion series to use the same katakana for "Shin" (シン・).) Shin Ultraman (2022), and Shin Kamen Rider. A statue depicting the film's incarnation of Kamen Rider was displayed alongside a statue of the 2016 incarnation of Godzilla and a statue of the 2022 incarnation of Ultraman as part of the Hideaki Anno Exhibition at the Abeno Harukas Art Museum, located in Abeno-ku, Osaka.

The theatrical release poster and a second trailer, as well as additional casting information, were unveiled on May 13, 2022, alongside the theatrical release of Shin Ultraman.

=== Theatrical ===
Shin Kamen Rider premiered at selected Japanese theaters on March 17, 2023 at 6:00 p.m. and was released nationwide the following day. The cast had a "stage greeting" on the former date and the film was also screened in IMAX, 4DX and Dolby Cinema theaters. In April 2021, Shirakura declared the film would be released internationally, but the exact date was still undecided. The film was released theatrically in the United States on May 31, 2023 via Fathom Events. In Southeast Asia, the film was released by Neofilms in Indonesia on June 30, the Philippines on July 5, Malaysia on July 6, and Singapore on July 20.

=== Home media ===
The film began streaming on Amazon Prime Video, under the title "Shin Masked Rider", on July 21, 2023, in over 200 countries and territories worldwide. A Thai language audio dub track is available but as of 25th October 2025 there have been no other dubs although subtitles are available in English, Arabic, German, Spanish (both Spain and Latin America), Filipino, French, Indonesian, Italian, Korean, Malay, Brazilian Portuguese, Vietnamese, and Traditional Chinese.

== Reception ==
=== Box office ===
Upon its release, the film was predicted to gross ¥2 billion, only half the amount its predecessor Shin Ultraman made at the box office. Shin Kamen Rider opened at #2 at the Japanese box office (behind My Happy Marriage), grossing ¥542 million ($4.12 million) during the first three days of its release. The film remained at #3 at the Japanese box office (behind Everything Everywhere All at Once and My Happy Marriage), until it returned to #2 on March 27, 2023. On April 3, 2023, Mikikazu Komatsu of Crunchyroll stated that the film "was down two positions to fifth in its third weekend, with a cumulative total gross of 1.5 billion yen (11.66 million USD). The reception in the otaku community has been much quieter than for the previous two Shin films, and the final box-office performance may not even reach the two billion yen that was initially predicted when it was released." However, on April 24, 2023, it was announced that the film had become the highest-grossing in the Kamen Rider series, having earned ¥2.02 billion ($15.02 million) at the box office.

=== Critical response ===
The film has received mainly positive reviews from critics. On the review aggregator website Rotten Tomatoes, 89% of 18 critics' reviews are positive, with an average rating of 7.00/10.

IGN Japan's Hajime Kasai gave it a score of 7/10, saying that it "seems to have expanded Hideaki Anno's inhuman world view" and did so "more than in the Evangelion series." Matt Schley of The Japan Times gave the film a score of 3.5/5, stating that despite being "plenty for two hours of fun at the movies" it is a "slight letdown for those who’ve seen Anno at his best." Schley wrote: "It's pretty silly stuff, and Anno embraces the 1970s-style camp to its hilt. This isn't a parody, though: He's having fun, not poking fun. The reverence for the material is evident, and I'm sure there are plenty of easter eggs and references for "Kamen Rider" fans". Richard Eisenbeis of Anime News Network gave the film an overall rating of B+, calling it "a solid film and a love letter to one of the grandfathers of tokusatsu TV shows."

=== Accolades ===
Minami Hamabe won Best Supporting Actress at the 66th Blue Ribbon Awards for her performances in Shin Kamen Rider and Takashi Yamazaki's Godzilla Minus One. Hamabe has also been nominated for Best Supporting Actress at the 47th Japan Academy Film Prize for her role in the film.

== Potential sequel ==
Anno revealed on April 9, 2023, that he deliberately left the possibility of a Shin Kamen Rider sequel open, adding that he is prepared to make one if Toei requested it. He had begun planning such a film while writing Shin Kamen Rider, which he titled Shin Kamen Rider: Masker World (シン・仮面ライダー 仮面の世界(マスカーワールド), Shin Kamen Raidā: Masukā Wārudo).

== Bibliography ==
- Anno, Hideaki (May 13, 2022). シン・ウルトラマン デザインワークス [Shin Ultraman Design Works] (in Japanese). Khara, Inc.; Ground Works. ISBN 978-4-905033-28-8.
- "シン・仮面ライダー徹底研究" [Shin Kamen Rider: Thorough Research]. Pen (in Japanese). No. 538. CCC Media House. February 28, 2023. ASIN B0BTD46S3Q.
- "YEARBOOK 2022". Uchusen (in Japanese). No. 176. Hobby Japan. April 2022. ISBN 978-4-7986-2796-0.
