= Tohl Narita =

Japanese visual artist (1929–2002)

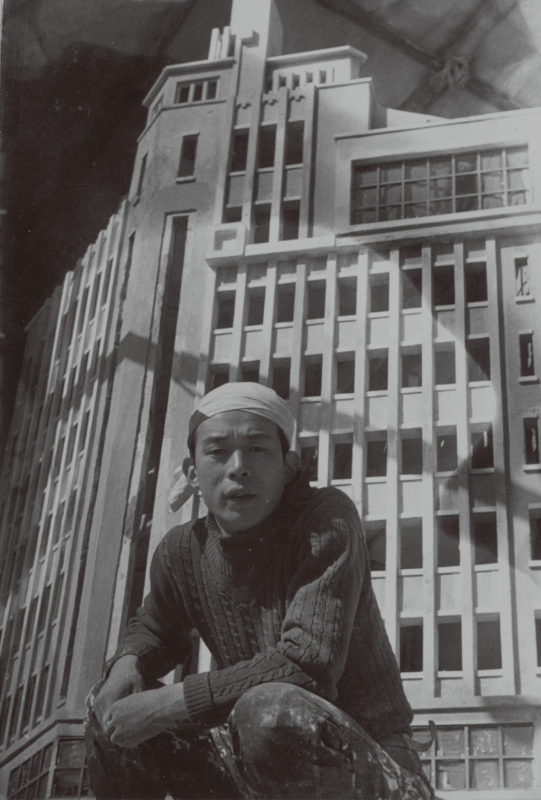
- Narita on the set of Godzilla Raids Again in 1955
- Born: Tōru Narita; September 3, 1929; Kobe, Hyōgo, Japan
- Died: February 26, 2002 (aged 72)
- Education: Musashino Art University
- Occupations: Painter; sculptor; designer; art director; special effects director; author
- Spouse: Ruri
- Children: Kairi
- Website: tohlnarita.com

Tōru "Tohl" Narita (成田 亨, Narita Tōru; pronounced [nəˈriːtə]; September 3, 1929 – February 26, 2002) was a Japanese visual artist. He is best known for creating the characters and mechanics for the television programs in the Ultra series: Ultra Q, Ultraman, and Ultraseven.

== Biography ==
=== Childhood and education (1929–1954) ===
Narita was born on September 3, 1929, in Kobe City, Hyōgo, Japan. His family moved to Aomori shortly after his birth. When he was eight months old, Narita suffered a burn on his left hand after grabbing charcoal from the hearth in his abode; his hand didn't heal even after having many surgeries.

Narita began school in April 1936, at Aomori Municipal Furukawa Elementary School. At eight years old, his family moved to Ōshō Village, Muko District, Hyōgo (presently Amagasaki), and was transferred to Ritsudai Sho Jinjo Elementary School (presently Amagasaki Municipal Osho Elementary School). Due to the school's separation, Narita completed the fourth grade at Ritsudai Sho Jinjo Second Elementary School (presently Amagasaki Nishi Elementary School, where he stayed six years until the age of fourteen. During his time in elementary school, he was bullied due to his language differences and the burn on his left hand. Narita also decided he wanted to become a painter in the future.

After graduating from Aomori Junior High (now Aomori High School), Narita worked as a printer to save money, and in 1950 entered Musashino Art School (presently Musashino Art University). Initially, he majored in Western painting but felt dissatisfied with the class and moved to the sculpting department.

=== Career (1954–1987) ===
Narita at his drawing table

After graduating from Musashino Art School, he made part of his income doing special effects production work on the 1954 film Godzilla. He then began working as a Tokusatsu artist for Toei starting in 1960. In 1965 he began working for Tsuburaya Visual Effects Productions (later renamed Tsuburaya Productions). In addition to working as a designer, Narita was also a sculptor, painter, and director of special effects. He is best noted for his work on the Ultra series, known in the vernacular as "Narita's Monsters". He went on to work in TV special effects for the shows, Assault! Human!!, Enban Sensō Bankid, and Mighty Jack. In 1968 he became a freelance artist and worked on films and movies including Children of Nagasaki, The Bullet Train, Mahjong horoki, and Men and War.

He continued to create and exhibit his oil painting and sculptures throughout his life, including a public artwork, Demon Monument, located in Fukuchi City, Kyoto. Narita's work was included in the Little Boy: The Arts of Japan's Exploding Subculture exhibition at the Japan Society in New York City. The exhibition featured his drawings "a favorite of otaku artists"; the series of drawings showed monsters transforming into buildings, stones and trees, and other inanimate objects. His work was the subject of a major retrospective exhibition at the Aomori Museum in 2015 that included 700 pieces of his work. The show traveled to the Fukuoka Art Museum.

A monograph was produced on his work, entitled “Narita Toru Illustration Works 成田亨作品集” (400 pages). It is held in the Library of Congress.

=== Death (2002) ===
Narita died on February 26, 2002, at age 72, from multiple cerebral infarctions.

== Personal life ==
1955, Narita married Shizuko Ishikawa, and the following year, in 1956, their first son, Kei Narita, was born. 1966, he divorced Shizuko and, in the same year, remarried Ruri Kiyose; their daughter, Iri, was born, followed by another child, Kairi, in 1970.

== Filmography ==
=== Film ===
- Godzilla (1954)
- Godzilla Raids Again (1955)
- Half Human (1955)
- The Legend of the White Serpent (1956)
- Rodan (1956)
- The Mysterians (1957)
- Varan the Unbelievable (1958)
- Monkey Sun (1959)
- Submarine I-57 Will Not Surrender (1959)
- The Three Treasures (1959)
- Battle in Outer Space (1959)
- Storm Over the Pacific (1960)
- Invasion of the Neptune Men (1961)
- Terror Beneath the Sea (1966)
- The War of the Gargantuas (1966)
- Karafuto 1945 Summer Hyosetsu no Mon (1974)
- The Bullet Train (1975)
- Children of Nagasaki (1983)
- Mahjong Hōrōki (1984)
- Sukeban Deka (1987)
- Shin Ultraman (2022; posthumous)

=== Television ===
- National Kid (1960-1961)
- Ultra Q (1966)
- Ultraman (1966-1967)
- Ultraseven (1967-1968)
- Mighty Jack (1968)
- Thunder Mask (1972-1973)
- Assault! Human!! (1972)
- Enban Sensō Bankid (1976-1977)

== Litigation ==
In his late life, Narita filed a lawsuit against Tsuburaya Productions. Tsuburaya had claimed Narita's alien and kaiju designs to be entirely their creation, and was erasing Narita's name from his art.

== Legacy ==
=== Influence ===
Takashi Murakami has cited Narita as a significant influence on his work. Hideaki Anno and Shinji Higuchi were inspired by Narita's art for Ultraman when making Shin Ultraman.

=== Collections ===
Narita's monster design prints are held in the permanent collection of the Aomori Prefectural Art Museum, and the Toyama Prefectural Museum of Art & Design.
