= Shin Ultraman =

2022 film directed by Shinji Higuchi

- Theatrical release poster by Toshiki Hosokawa

Japanese name
- Katakana: シン・ウルトラマン
Transcriptions
- Revised Hepburn: Shin Urutoraman
- Directed by: Shinji Higuchi
- Written by: Hideaki Anno
- Based on: Ultraman by Eiji Tsuburaya
- Produced by: Hideaki Anno; Kazutoshi Wadakura; Takehiko Aoki; Tomoya Nishino; Masaki Kawashima
- Starring: Takumi Saitoh; Masami Nagasawa; Daiki Arioka; Akari Hayami; Tetsushi Tanaka; Hidetoshi Nishijima
- Cinematography: Osamu Ichikawa; Keizō Suzuki; Katsuro Onoue; Masayuki; Ikki Todoroki; Shinji Higuchi; Hideaki Anno; Linto Ueda (Note: Onoue, Masayuki, Todoroki, Higuchi, Anno, and Ueda are credited separately from Ichikawa and Suzuki.)
- Edited by: Yōhei Kurihara; Hideaki Anno
- Music by: Shirō Sagisu
- Production companies: Toho Studios (Note: Tsuburaya Productions initially announced that Toho Pictures would co-produce the film with Cine Bazar on August 1, 2019. After merging with Toho Studio Service on December 1, 2020, the company was renamed Toho Studios.); Cine Bazar
- Distributed by: Toho
- Presented by: Tsuburaya Productions; Toho; Khara
- Release date: May 13, 2022 (Japan)
- Running time: 112 minutes
- Country: Japan
- Languages: Japanese; English
- Budget: ¥800–900 million (Note: Estimation made by Hideaki Anno during pre-production; roughly $5.52 million–$6.28 million in 2022.) ($5–6 million)
- Box office: $34.4 million (Note: Shin Ultraman's worldwide box office: Japan – ¥4.44 billion ($33.5 million); Foreign – $941,594)

Shin Ultraman (シン・ウルトラマン, Shin Urutoraman) (Note: Anno chose the katakana for Shin in the film's title, which has a variety of meanings, including: "new" (新), "true" (真), "god" (神), "profound" (深), and "essence" (粋). Toho Cinemas formatted its title as Shin-Ultraman. In homage to the title card featured in the original 1966 series, it was marketed in Japan with the subtitle "A Special Effects Fantasy Film" (空想特撮映画, Kūsō Tokusatsu Eiga).) is a 2022 Japanese superhero film directed by Shinji Higuchi and written, co-produced, and co-edited by Hideaki Anno. A reimagining of the 1966 television series Ultraman, the film is a co-production between Toho Studios and Cine Bazar, and presented by Tsuburaya Productions, Toho Co., Ltd., and Khara, Inc. It is the 37th film in the Ultraman franchise, and Anno and Higuchi's second reimagining of a tokusatsu series, following Shin Godzilla (2016) and preceding Shin Kamen Rider (2023). The ensemble cast includes Takumi Saitoh, Masami Nagasawa, Daiki Arioka, Akari Hayami, Tetsushi Tanaka, and Hidetoshi Nishijima, with Anno and Bin Furuya as Ultraman. In the film, an extraterrestrial accidentally kills a man while battling a kaiju and takes on his appearance and place at the S-Class Species Suppression Protocol to protect Earth from further threats.

In the summer of 2017, Anno was tasked with writing a proposal for a trilogy of Ultraman productions by Takayuki Tsukagoshi, the future chairman of Tsuburaya Productions. A year after completing the plan for the trilogy on January 17, 2018, Anno wrote the first draft of Shin Ultraman's screenplay on February 5, 2019. However, his participation in the film had to be deferred until the completion of Evangelion: 3.0+1.0 Thrice Upon a Time (2021). Tsuburaya officially announced the film had begun production on August 1, 2019. Principal photography took place during late 2019 in Ibaraki Prefecture, Hiratsuka and Yokohama in Kanagawa Prefecture, Kōfu and Minobu in Yamanashi Prefecture, and Ichihara in Chiba Prefecture, and wrapped in November. Post-production was decelerated by the COVID-19 pandemic, resulting in editing taking roughly two-and-a-half years.

After being delayed from a summer 2021 release date due to the COVID-19 pandemic, Shin Ultraman premiered in Japan on May 13, 2022. The film grossed $34 million worldwide, becoming the sixth-highest-grossing Japanese film of 2022 and the most commercially successful Ultraman film. Critics praised its direction, characters, editing, cinematography, visual effects, musical score, and action sequences, but some criticized the screenplay's structure and perceived lack of themes. (Note: Attributed to multiple references:) It received eight nominations at the 46th Japan Academy Film Prize, including Picture of the Year, and won three.

== Plot ==
Following the invasion of several kaiju in Japan, the government establish the S-Class Species Suppression Protocol (SSSP) to eliminate further threats. When the SSSP respond to an attack by an S-Class kaiju dubbed "Neronga", a silver giant extraterrestrial emerges from the sky and defeats Neronga. However, the incident leaves SSSP member Shinji Kaminaga injured while trying to save a lost child. Analyst Hiroko Asami is transferred from the Public Security Intelligence Agency to the SSSP and partnered with Kaminaga, who seemingly recovered from his injuries, but also acts unfamiliar with social norms; Asami submits a report on the silver giant, dubbing it "Ultraman". The SSSP respond to another S-Class Species attack by a kaiju dubbed "Gabora". Unbeknownst to the SSSP, Kaminaga transforms into Ultraman, now adorned with red and silver colors; he defeats Gabora before it could attack a nuclear waste storage facility.

Another alien, named Zarab, makes contact with the SSSP, with the intention of establishing an accord with Japan's government. After Kaminaga learns of Zarab's true intentions to influence countries to destroy each other by triggering conflict, he is neutralized and kidnapped by Zarab. To discredit Ultraman, Zarab attacks parts of Japan disguised as Ultraman and leaks footage of Kaminaga's transformation; resulting in an international manhunt. Asami receives Kaminaga's transforming device, the Beta Capsule, for safekeeping from Zarab. Asami finds and frees Kaminaga but is captured by Zarab herself. Kaminaga retrieves the Beta Capsule and transforms into Ultraman, saves Asami, and exposes Zarab's disguise before defeating him.

While Kaminaga goes into hiding, Asami is kidnapped and transformed into a mind-controlled giant by another alien, named Mefilas. Demonstrating good faith, he reverts Asami back to normal size using the Beta Box, a large variant of the Beta Capsule. Mefilas strikes a deal with the government to supply them with the Beta Box for deterrent purposes in return for unconditional obedience. Kaminaga disagrees with Mefilas' plan and conspires with the SSSP to stop the exchange. They successfully hijack the Box and Ultraman engages Mefilas in combat. Mefilas rescinds his plans after noticing Ultraman's superior Zōffy observing their battle and warns Ultraman of a coming threat before departing Earth with the Box.

The SSSP are briefly detained for aiding Ultraman but are soon released after their Chief convinces his superior that Ultraman coerced them. Kaminaga converses with Zōffy in the forest where Kaminaga was injured. It is revealed that Kaminaga was not injured but killed by debris when Ultraman landed. Inspired by Kaminaga's sacrifice, Ultraman had assumed his identity to better understand him. Zōffy informs Ultraman that he is to face punishment for breaking their planet's code of merging with a human. Believing that humanity would pose a threat if they could evolve into giants, Zōffy employs the ultimate weapon Zetton to eradicate them.

Kaminaga warns the SSSP of this, leaves them a flash drive, and flies to Earth's orbit as Ultraman to stop Zetton. Defeated, Kaminaga is hospitalized while the government decides not to disclose humanity's fate to the world as a final act of mercy. SSSP physicist Akihisa Taki opens Kaminaga's flash drive and uncovers the basic principles and theorems of the Beta Capsule and higher dimensional domains. After Kaminaga regains consciousness, Taki reveals to him the method that he and international scientists had devised to defeat Zetton. Kaminaga transforms into Ultraman and opens a black hole by igniting the Beta Capsule one millisecond before Zetton fires its heatwave. The black hole swallows Zetton and Ultraman but Zōffy rescues Ultraman.

Zōffy insists that Ultraman returns to their planet, but Ultraman wishes to stay and protect Earth. Zōffy refuses to compromise, thus Ultraman decides to sacrifice himself to resurrect Kaminaga. Zōffy questions Ultraman's decision to sacrifice himself to save an inferior race, but after witnessing their teamwork to defeat Zetton, he is forced to admire their tenacity in the face of death. The SSSP then greets Kaminaga as he opens his eyes, having received a second chance at life.

== Cast ==
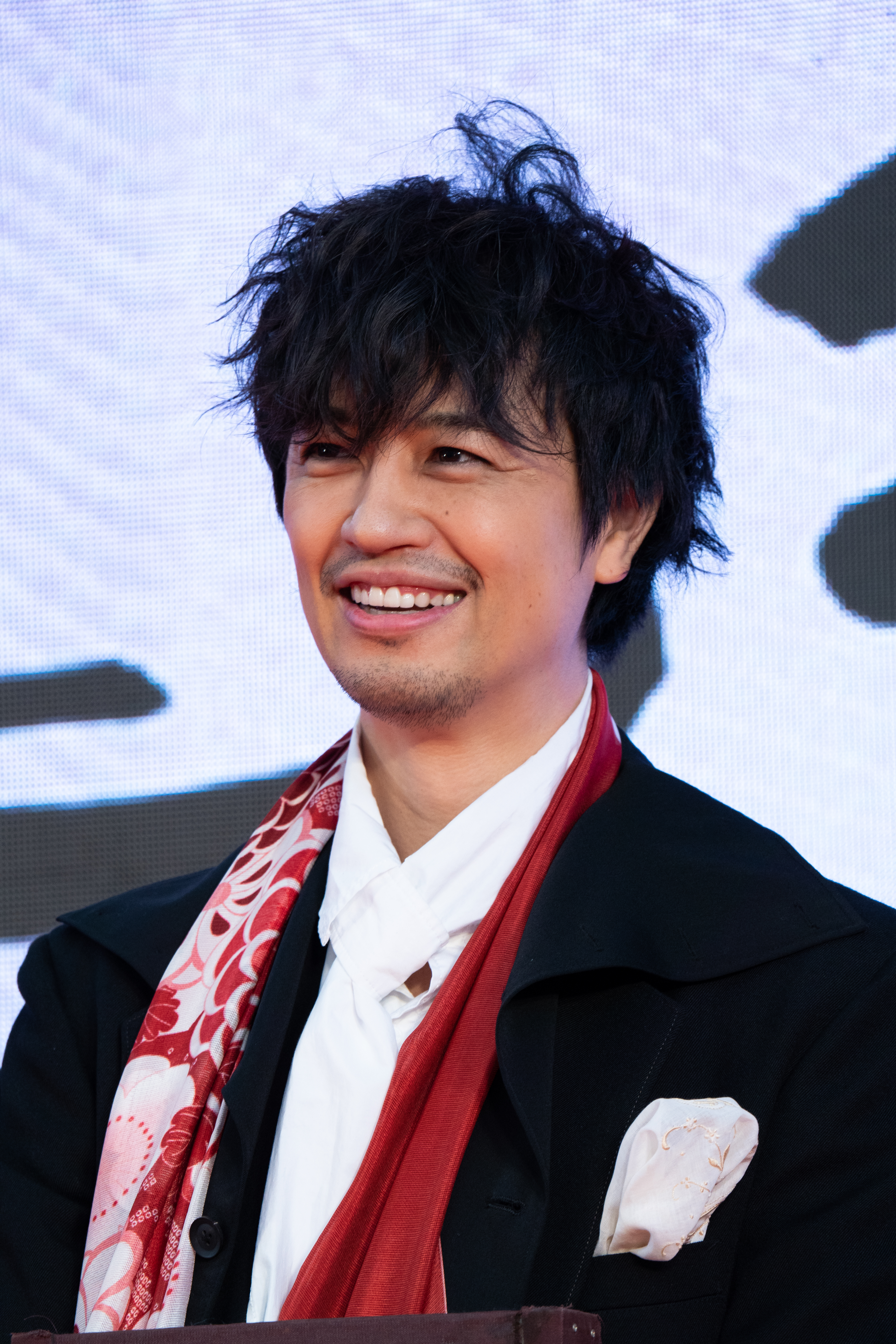
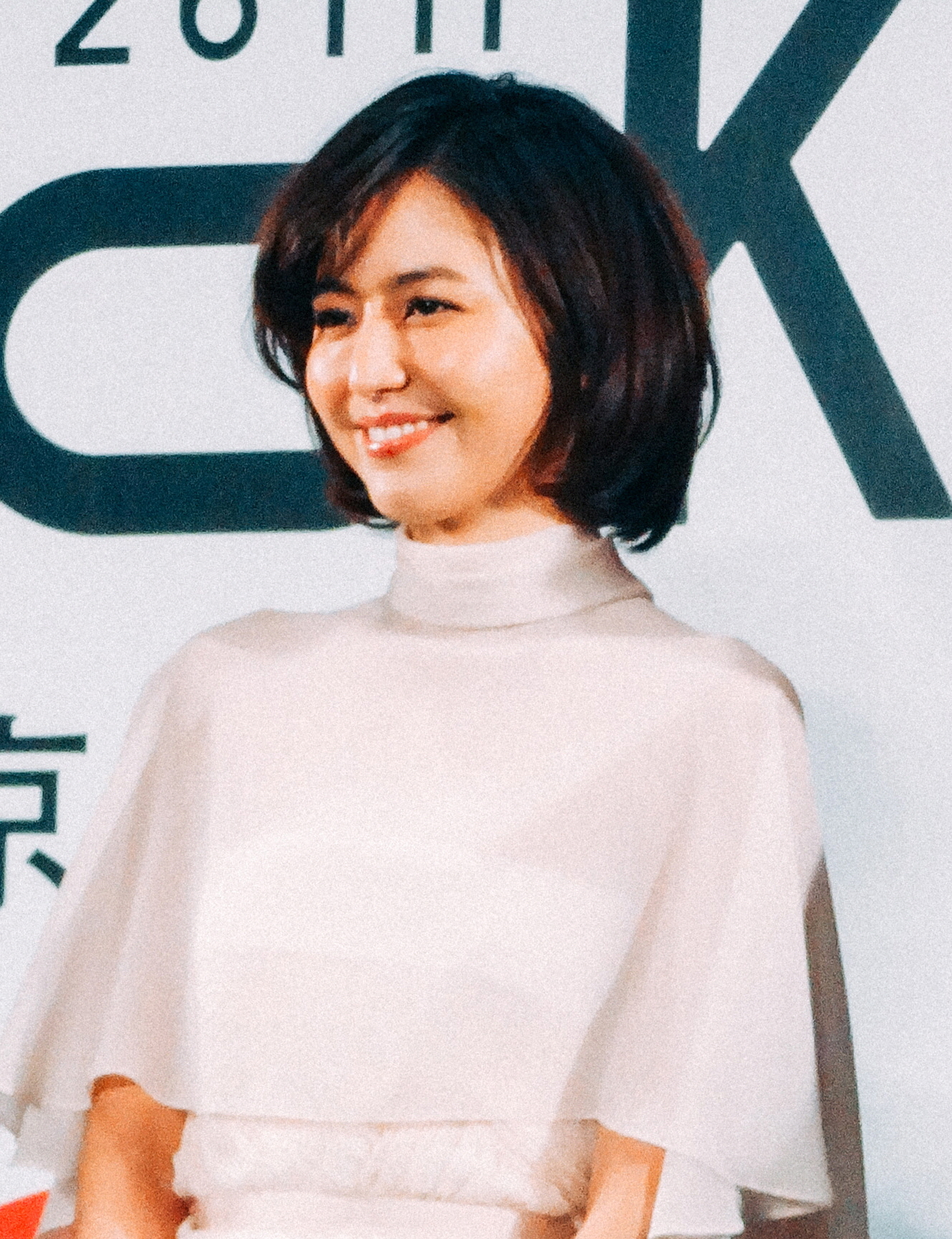
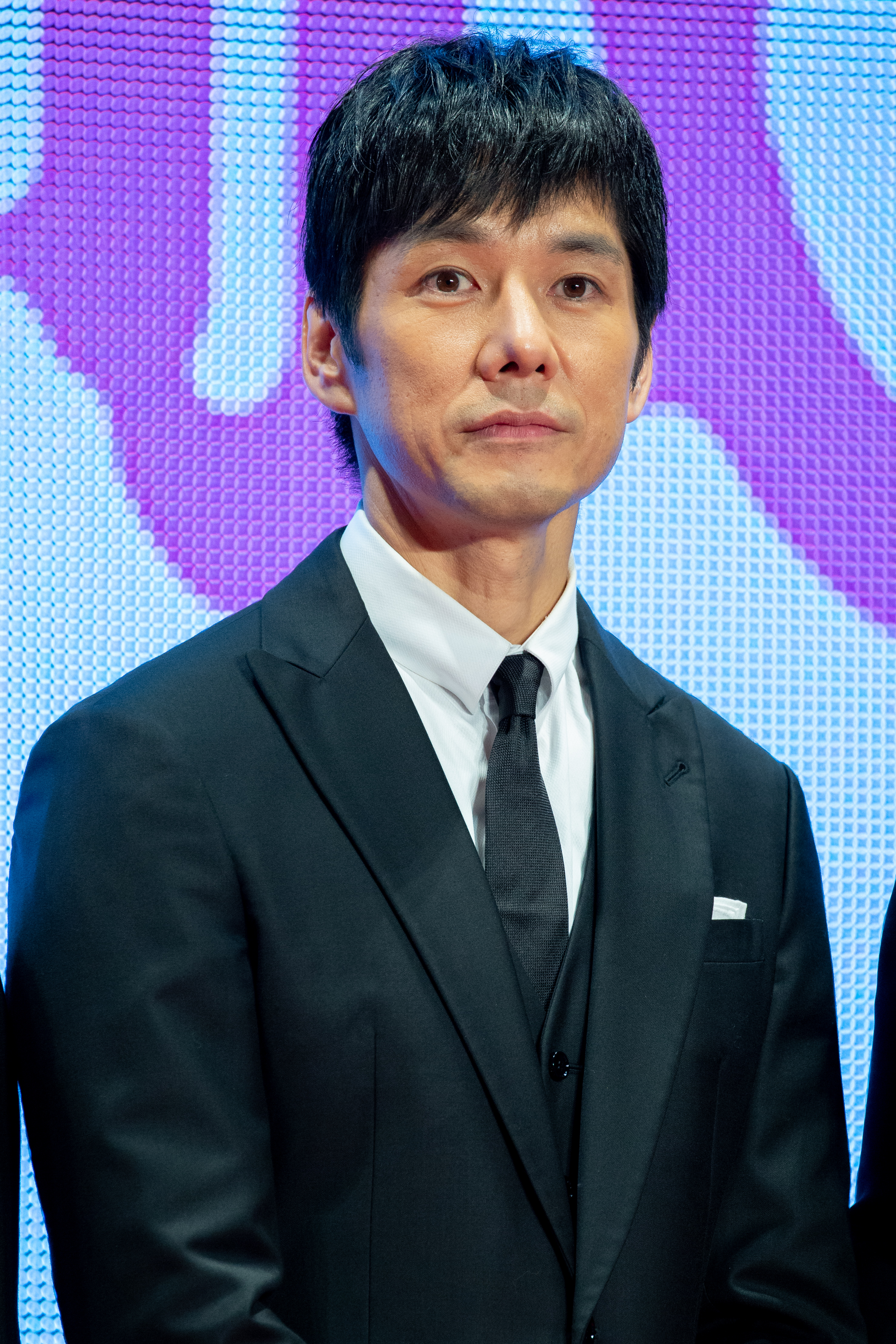
Top to bottom: Takumi Saitoh, Masami Nagasawa, and Hidetoshi Nishijima star in the film as Shinji Kaminaga, Hiroko Asami and Kimio Tamura respectively.
- Takumi Saitoh as Shinji Kaminaga, an executive strategy officer who worked for the National Police Agency Security Bureau before he was designated to the S-Class Species Suppression Protocol (SSSP). He is unintentionally killed by Ultraman during his fight with Neronga. Ultraman took his appearance and place. Saitoh has a fond memory of playing with Ultraman figures and his father worked on the 1973 TV series Ultraman Taro. Saitoh had previously played a JSDF tank squadron commander named Ikeda in Shin Godzilla.
- Masami Nagasawa as Hiroko Asami, an analyst who worked for the Public Security Intelligence Agency before she was appointed to the SSSP.
- Hidetoshi Nishijima as Kimio Tamura, the leader of the SSSP who formerly worked at the Ministry of Defense. The day before the film's release, Nishijima appeared as Tamura in two 24-second web-exclusive commercials for Procter & Gamble's dishwashing liquid Joy.
- Daiki Arioka as Akihisa Taki, an unparticle physicist who graduated from the Johoku University of Science. Taki is an otaku and has models of USS Enterprise (NCC-1701) from Star Trek: The Original Series, and Thunderbirds 1, 2, 3, 4, and 5 from Thunderbirds on his desk.
- Akari Hayami as Yumi Funaberi, a universal biologist who worked at the Ministry of Education, Culture, Sports, Science and Technology before she was appointed to the SSSP.
- Tetsushi Tanaka as Tatsuhiko Munakata, Chief of the SSSP
- Kyusaku Shimada as Taishi Okuma, the Prime Minister of Japan
- Ryō Iwamatsu as Hajime Komuro, the Minister of State for Disaster Management
- Tōru Masuoka as Kunihiko Kariba, the Minister of Defense
- Keishi Nagatsuka as Hayasaka, Japan Ground Self-Defense Force Cmdr.
- Hajime Yamazaki as Seiichi Nakanishi, the Minister of Foreign Affairs
- Masami Horiuchi as the Chief Cabinet Secretary of Japan
- Gō Rijū as the Special Advisor to the Prime Minister
- Sōkō Wada as Kagami, member of the National Police Agency Security Bureau
- Yutaka Takenouchi as a government official. In Shin Ultraman Design Works, screenwriter Hideaki Anno indicated Takenouchi's character to be a reprisal of his role as Hideki Akasaka from Shin Godzilla.
- Bin Furuya and Hideaki Anno as Ultraman/Lipiah (motion capture), an extraterrestrial from the Star of Light who came to Earth to protect humanity from kaiju and was dubbed "Ultraman" by Asami. Furuya and Anno have both portrayed Ultraman before; Furuya portrayed the titular hero in the original 1966 series, and Anno unofficially portrayed the character in his 1983 fan film Daicon Film's Return of Ultraman.
  - Issey Takahashi as the voice of Ultraman. Despite his name being listed in the film's credits, Takahashi's role was not officially disclosed until one month after its release. During an interview, Takahashi said it was "like a dream come true" to portray the character.
- Koichi Yamadera as the voice of Zōffy, Ultraman's superior who tries to eradicate humanity with the weapon of mass destruction, Zetton, believing that they would pose a threat if they were able to evolve into giants. To reference misinformation about his first appearance in Ultraman's series finale, the character's Japanese name is deliberately spelled incorrectly in the film.
- Koji Yamamoto as Alien Mefilas, an extraterrestrial who tries to prove to humanity that they can also become giants. He asks Ultraman to become his ally but is turned down by him and later fights him due to their differing opinions regarding humanity.
- Kenjiro Tsuda as the voice of Alien Zarab, an extraterrestrial who kidnaps Kaminaga and impersonates Ultraman, only to be defeated by Ultraman himself.

=== English dub ===
- Chris Hackney as Shinji Kaminaga
- Dawn M. Bennett as Hiroko Asami
- John Burgmeier as Kimio Tamura
- Brandon McInnis as Akihisa Taki
- Emily Frongillo as Yumi Funaberi
- Brook Chalmers as Tatsuhiko Munakata
- Charlie Campbell as Taishi Okuma
- Matt Shipman as Kagami
- Frank Todaro as a Foreign Affairs officer
- Jim Foronda as a government official
- Steven Kelly as Ultraman
- Theo Devaney as Zōffy
- Jordan Woollen as Mefilas
- Kellen Goff as Zarab
- Christopher Sabat as Misc. characters
- Christian Thorsen as Misc. characters

The cast of the English dub are taken from Anime News Network and Ultraman Connection.

== Production ==
=== Crew ===
- Shinji Higuchi – director, storyboard artist, and cinematographer (Note: The latter with Hideaki Anno, Katsuro Onoue, Masayuki, Ikki Todoroki, and Linto Ueda; see first note.)
- Hideaki Anno – various positions (Note: Including, supervisor, writer, producer (with Kazutoshi Wadakura, Takehiko Aoki, Tomoya Nishino, and Masaki Kawashima), executive producer (with Takayuki Tsukakoshi, Hidetoshi Yamamoto, and Minami Ichikawa), organizer, editor (with Yōhei Kurihara), cinematographer (with Katsuro Onoue, Masayuki, Ikki Todoroki, Shinji Higuchi, and Linto Ueda; see first note), concept designer, logo designer, teaser poster designer (with Ikki Todoroki), marketing supervisor, and song selector.)
- Katsuro Onoue – associate director and cinematographer (Note: The latter with Hideaki Anno, Masayuki, Ikki Todoroki, Shinji Higuchi, and Linto Ueda; see first note.)
- Masayuki – assistant director and cinematographer (Note: The latter with Hideaki Anno, Katsuro Onoue, Ikki Todoroki, Shinji Higuchi, and Linto Ueda; see first note.)
- Ikki Todoroki – deputy director, teaser poster designer, and cinematographer (Note: Todoroki created the teaser poster with Hideaki Anno, and is credited for cinematography alongside Anno, Katsuro Onoue, Masayuki, Shinji Higuchi, and Linto Ueda; see first note.)
- Hisashi Usui – executive producer
- Katsura Kurosawa – executive producer
- Akihiro Yamauchi – co-producer
- Kensei Mori – line producer
- Tohl Narita – original kaiju and extraterrestrial designs (posthumous)
- Satoru Sasaki – VFX director
- Atsuki Satō – VFX supervisor
- Hiromasa Inoue – VFX producer
- Masayo Ohno – VFX producer

Personnel are taken from Toho's official website, the film's theater pamphlet, and Anime News Network.

=== Development ===
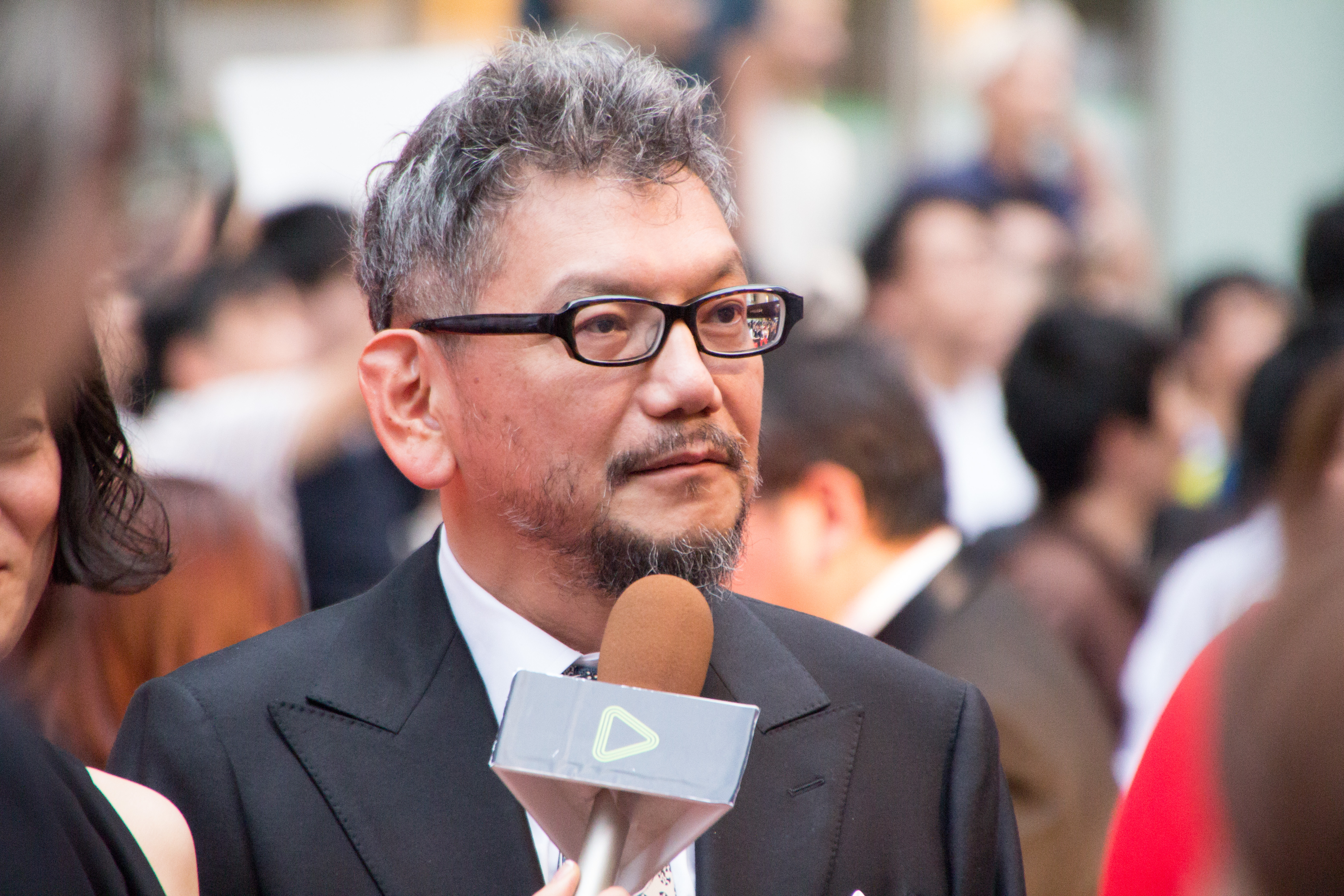
Hideaki Anno (pictured in 2016) supervised, organized, wrote, co-produced, and co-edited the film.

On December 28, 2013, nine years prior to Shin Ultraman's release, Hideaki Anno completed the draft for a reboot of the Ultraman franchise entitled Return of Ultraman Plot Memo (帰ってきたウルトラマンプロットメモ, Kaettekita Urutoraman Purotto Memo) and submitted it to Tsuburaya Productions on March 19 of the following year. Anno later reflected, "I wrote [the script] to some friends and their reactions were positive ... but at the time I was not able to finalize the content of the project in a way that satisfied me, so it was abandoned." A life-long Ultraman fan, Anno had made his directorial debut with his own fan film of Return of Ultraman for Daicon Film when he was a film student at Osaka University of Arts.

In the summer of 2017, Takayuki Tsukagoshi —who would later be appointed chairman of Tsuburaya Productions on November 16, 2017, after Hidetoshi Yamamoto, the chairman of Fields Corporation, failed to organize production— commissioned Anno to direct an Ultraman production and its two sequels, set to be released in 2020. A few months later, Anno submitted a recreation of Return of Ultraman Plot Memo, to Tsukagoshi. On January 17, 2018, Anno finished the proposal for the trilogy of Ultraman productions in which he wrote:

"Our goal is to create a world of Ultraman that is not for children, but for the generation that watched Ultraman back then, and that they want to watch now that they are adults. We aim to create entertainment for adults that is consistent with the modern age, a coexistence of dreams and reality that can be depicted only with special effects images. To achieve this goal, we will draw an interesting work that emphasizes quality and sensitivity (even in terms of reality), glistening with the theme of invasion rather than a catastrophe."

A first draft of the script for the film was completed by Anno on February 5, 2019, however, his involvement in the film was put on hold for another year while he worked on Evangelion: 3.0+1.0 Thrice Upon a Time. In Shin Ultraman Design Works, Anno stated that he wrote the script with the intention that the film would be connected to his previous tokusatsu film, Shin Godzilla: "The overall worldview of the film may be somewhat connected to that of Shin Godzilla". However, he noted that "copyright management", obviated the film from being accredited as a sequel to Shin Godzilla and made it "hard to make a clear connection". Nevertheless, Anno still made some clear connections to its predecessor; the katakana for Shin being used film's title, Shin Godzilla's logo being displayed onscreen in the title sequence (evoking Ultra Q's logo appearing in the original Ultraman title sequence), Yutaka Takenouchi returning to portray a government official, and the subtitle "Giant Unidentified Lifeform" used to refer to the kaiju.

Higuchi said that production on the film was initially challenging: "We immediately ran into a practical problem: We didn't have as big a budget as those American MonsterVerse films, so we couldn't really destroy the world like they did. We tried to compensate by coming up with a uniquely appealing screenplay and really interesting characters. Additionally, Higuchi told Nerdist in 2022 that the film does not include the same "emphasis on the bureaucracy, politics, etc." as its predecessor, because "if we just did the same thing, it's kind of pointless." Rather, Higuchi explained that the crew intended the film to delineate how humanity and the Japanese government would deal with aliens and monsters as depicted in the original 1966 Ultraman TV series.

The project was unofficially announced by Nikkan Taishu on March 6, 2019, followed by an official announcement by Tsuburaya Productions on August 1, 2019, with the latter revealing Higuchi as the director and Anno as the screenwriter. Masami Nagasawa, Hidetoshi Nishijima and Takumi Saitoh were named to star in the film. The film would be co-produced between Toho Pictures and Cine Bazar and presented by Tsuburaya, Toho and Khara, with an aim for a 2021 release. Higuchi commented, "A baton has been entrusted to me that has been shining ever since I was a small child. I will solemnly strive to fulfill my responsibility to pass on that heavy, radiant baton created by my seniors." The rest of the supporting cast members were announced in September of that same year.

=== Designs ===
Ultraman's design was based upon Tohl Narita's 1983 depiction of the character entitled "Incarnation of Truth, Justice, and Beauty".

The design of Ultraman was unveiled at the 2019 Tsuburaya Convention. The concept is based on the 1983 oil painting "Incarnation of Truth, Justice, and Beauty" (真実と正義と美の化身, Shinjitsu to Seigi to Bi no Keshin) by Tohl Narita. The first concept art was made by Hideaki Anno on October 3, 2018, under the likeness of Bin Furuya, the hero's original suit actor in the 1966 series. This redesign of the original hero was based on Anno's desire to revisit Tohl Narita's original design, going as far as to seek permission from Narita's son, Kairi. The design in question has the mask modeled after Akira Sasaki, the body frame of Furuya, and eliminating elements such as the three-minute warning light called the "Color Timer", (Note: Because he removed the Color Timer from Ultraman's design, Anno decided to show Ultraman's energy levels by color; green when he was weak and red when he was vigorous.) and the back fin and peepholes that were part of the actor's costume. Furuya returned to portray the character with Anno via motion capture. Director Higuchi stated, "Without Furuya's physical features, such as his tall stature, long chin and arms, and large palms, it wouldn't have been possible to reproduce Ultraman's silhouette, appearance, behavior, etc. even with the latest technology available today." Likewise, Anno had experienced playing the titular hero in Daicon Film's Return of Ultraman.

"Ultraman is ... bizarre when you think about it ... He is dressed in a silvery, slimy thing that I don't know what it is, and although he looks like a human being, he is something other than a human being. I think Mr. Narita's design, which makes him look cool, is really amazing. For this project, we went through a series of adjustments to realistically reproduce the coexistence of Ultraman's metallic and biological aspects in CG."

— Shinji Higuchi, May 2022

The crew struggled to reproduce Ultraman's silver skin color virtually. Higuchi explained in an interview, "Ultraman can't be sprayed with silver paint like in the old days. But if you use mirror-like silver and seriously calculate and depict the rays of light, there would be weird streaks on his arms and face... and his arms and face would look like mirrors that would be reflecting in each other." VFX supervisor Atsuki Satō added "when it comes to color, there are things you can't understand until you actually place the object on the stage, such as the reflection of the silver color on the body and its glittering effect. The hardest part was finding the right balance between reality and image."

Since the beginning of production, Anno and Higuchi had intended to utilize the 3DCG model of Godzilla from their 2016 film Shin Godzilla to depict the kaiju Gomess, who first appeared in episode 1 of Tsuburaya Productions' 1966 TV series Ultra Q. Anno stated that "since Toho was a member of the [Shin Ultraman] production committee we [were allowed to use] the original Godzilla model for Gomess." The concept art for Gomess was also customized from the original concept art for Godzilla's fourth form in Shin Godzilla. Similarly, the digital set for Tokyo Station, where the second giant unidentified lifeform dubbed the "Mamouth Flower" appeared, was reused from Shin Godzilla in order to reduce the film's budget.

The third giant unidentified lifeform to appear in the film, Peguila, who served as the antagonist of episodes 5 and 14 in Tsuburaya Productions' Ultra Q, was based upon an illustration by Yūji Kaida, which depicted "cold air flowing from the surface of its body". The fifth giant unidentified lifeform to appear in the film, Kaigel, who debuted in episode 24 of Ultra Q, (Note: "Kaigel" was the initial name for the kaiju, who was called "Gōga" in the episode.) was also based on an illustration by Kaida, as well as the kaiju's original concept art by Narita. Anno drew the computer-generated (CG) model of the fourth kaiju to make an appearance in the film, Larugeus, who debuted in episode 12 of Ultra Q. In Shin Ultraman Design Works, Anno stated that he "tried to make it look like a real bird". The monsters Pagos, Neronga, and Gabora were modified from the same computer-generated model to reduce the film's budget. The same method was also used for their first appearance in 1966, when they were adapted from the suit of Baragon featured in Toho's 1965 film Frankenstein vs. Baragon.

Tohl Narita's original concept art for episode 18 of Ultraman inspired Alien Zarab's design. Anno stated that Zarab's expressions could not be achieved in a costume, but only with 3DCG, with the body part being transparent. A model of Zarab's head was created but it did not appear in the final cut and was used instead to design his CG depiction. The crew considered altering the body surface of the CG model for Ultraman to recreate Zarab's impersonation of the titular hero, however, only the eye shape was changed, inspired by Narita's hexagonal-eyed Ultraman illustration.

A 3D scan of Ultraman Jack's mask worn by Eiichi Kikuchi in Return of Ultraman was used to design the face of Ultraman's superior, Zōffy. Thus, Zōffy's face inherits Jack's slightly asymmetrical eye angle. The character's design was heavily inspired by Narita's 1989 concept art for Ultraman in Ultraman: Towards the Future, entitled "Ultraman Divine" (ウルトラマン神変, Urutoraman Shinpen). As part of the design process, the crew examined Zōffy's design in episode 39 of Ultraman, specifically the black line in the center of his head and a pattern near the surface line of his body. Zōffy's ultimate biological weapon, Zetton, was based upon Narita's original concept art created for its first appearance in episode 39 of Ultraman. However, the geometric features were emphasized in the final design.

=== Filming ===
On August 20, 2019, it was announced that Higuchi was looking for extras to take part in filming in late 2019. On November 23, 2019, Higuchi made a surprise appearance at the 2nd Atami Monster Film Festival to announce that principal photography had wrapped. Location shooting took place at the Prefectural Assembly Building in Ibaraki Prefecture, Hiratsuka and Yokohama in Kanagawa Prefecture, Kōfu and Minobu in Yamanashi Prefecture, and Ichihara in Chiba Prefecture. Several scenes were filmed in 4K using the cast and crew's personal iPhones and iPads.

The scene in which Asami, in a giant mind-controlled state, walks the streets of Tokyo, was filmed on the first day of principal photography, according to Nishijima. Nagasawa stated that Higuchi gave her explicit instructions of how to act in order for her to correspond with the computer graphics for the sequence. For the scene where Asami collapses, Higuchi instructed Nagasawa to fall to the ground and remain motionless. However, Nagasawa struggled to remain immobile, and Higuchi apologized to her afterward.

Ultraman and Mefilas' first conversation in their human disguises was filmed at Asakusa Ichimon, an Izakaya restaurant in the Asakusa district of Taitō, Tokyo, Japan. After the film's release, the restaurant was inundated with reservations. Anno cut a scene filmed by Higuchi, in which, Asami kisses Ultraman farewell in his human disguise, Shinji, before he departed Earth to defeat Zetton, in consideration of the overall balance of the moment.

=== Visual effects and editing ===
Visual effects for the film were created by Shirogumi. The visual effects crew used previsualization to create the storyboards for the computer-generated imagery. Post-production supervisor Linto Ueda explained that "This time we also used it [previsualization] to verify the angle that people would stare at a giant object when it was in front of them." According to Ueda, the crew also used photogrammetry to scan locations that would be used as computer-generated backdrops in the film's fight scenes, stating that "we [the visual effects crew] visited power plants in the provinces, walked around Tokyo, and went with the director [Shinji Higuchi] and film crew on location scouting trips to find image sources for the background." VFX supervisor Atsuki Satō added that "we took a lot of photographs from numerous angles using a drone and constructed 3DCG based on the differentiation in the data we captured to create the background."

Numerous visual effects sequences in the film are combined with original tokusatsu practical effects, such as extensive miniature effect shots. Ultraman's iconic Spacium Beam was created by optical artist Sadao Iizuka using the same technique he used for the original 1966 series, where he would draw a series of rays on paper and change their length and position slightly each time.

Yōhei Kurihara edited the film primarily using Adobe Premiere Pro. Director Higuchi edited a battle scene between Ultraman and one of the monsters. In the wake of the COVID-19 pandemic, post-production was decelerated, resulting in a roughly two-and-a-half-year editing process.

=== Music ===
Shin Ultraman Music Collection

Soundtrack album by Shirō Sagisu and Kunio Miyauchi (stock)
- Released: June 22, 2022
- Genres: Soundtrack, film score
- Length: 80:44
- Language: Japanese
- Label: King Records

Shirō Sagisu scored the film. The score features several of Sagisu's unused songs which he composed for Shin Godzilla and Neon Genesis Evangelion, as well as several recycled tracks by Kunio Miyauchi. King Records released the film's soundtrack album entitled Shin Ultraman Music Collection (シン・ウルトラマン音楽集, Shin Urutoraman Ongaku Shū) in Japan on June 22, 2022.

On April 8, 2022, it was announced that Kenshi Yonezu would sing the film's theme song "M87". According to Anno, Yonezu originally titled the song "M78" after Ultraman's fictional home galaxy in the original 1966 series, (Note: During the pre-production of the original Ultraman series, "M78" was intended to be called the "M87 nebula", a direct reference to the origin galaxy of the titular flying saucers from Shinichi Sekizawa's 1956 tokusatsu film Fearful Attack of the Flying Saucers, but it was accidentally printed as "M78" in the script.) but Anno requested that the title be changed to M87 because he felt it was "more appealing in terms of setting." On May 25, Oricon News reported that the single had sold approximately 228,881 physical copies. On May 31, "M87" became No. 1 on the Billboard Japan Hot 100. However, it was surpassed by Hey! Say! JUMP's "a r e a" on June 2. "M87" was certified Platinum by the Recording Industry Association of Japan in August 2024 for achieving 100 million streams. According to Natalie, Hiroshi Itsuki's song "Little Bird" from the 1974 TV series, Submersion of Japan, plays in the film during Kaminaga and Mefilas' conversation in an izakaya.

== Release ==
=== Marketing ===
On December 14, 2019, Tsuburaya Productions unveiled a miniature model of Ultraman's new design as well as a new logo for the film, during the opening ceremony of the 2019 Tsuburaya Convention. On November 2, 2020, a human-sized Ultraman statue was unveiled outside the Tokusatsu Archive Center in Sukagawa, the home of Ultraman creator Eiji Tsuburaya, and a summer 2021 release date was announced. The Ultraman statue was later displayed alongside a statue of the 2016 incarnation of Godzilla and a statue of the 2023 incarnation of Kamen Rider as part of the Hideaki Anno Exhibition at the Abeno Harukas Art Museum, located in Abeno-ku, Osaka. Its first teaser trailer was released on January 29, 2021, and received high praise from filmmakers Guillermo del Toro, Jordan Vogt-Roberts, and James Gunn. Two days later, Bandai's official website confirmed that the two monsters that appear in the trailer were Neronga and Gabora of the Ultraman 1966 TV series. During the 2021 Tsuburaya Convention, Tsuburaya Productions announced the new release date in Japan to be May 13, 2022, along with a new teaser trailer and a new poster.

On February 13, 2022, Toho, Khara, Toei, and Tsuburaya Productions announced a collaborative project titled "Shin Japan Heroes Universe" for merchandise, special events, and tie-ins. The project unites films that Anno had worked on that bear the katakana title "Shin" (シン), such as Shin Godzilla, Evangelion: 3.0+1.0 Thrice Upon a Time, (Note: Known in Japan as Shin Evangelion Theatrical Edition. It is the only film in the Rebuild of Evangelion series to use the same katakana for "Shin" (シン) also used in Shin Godzilla, Shin Ultraman, and Shin Kamen Rider.) Shin Ultraman and Shin Kamen Rider. On March 17, 2022, the final theatrical release poster and a new theatrical banner for the film were released. As part of the Hideaki Anno Exhibition at the Abeno Harukas Art Museum in Abeno-ku, Osaka, a longer trailer was shown exclusively in theaters and a third teaser trailer was released on April 15. On April 18, 2022, an 82-second trailer for the film was released. To promote the film in Japan, McDonald's released a new version of their Chicken tatsuta fried chicken burger called the "Shin Tatsuta Miyazaki Specialty Chicken Nanban Tartar" on April 20, 2022. The first ten minutes of the film were uploaded to Toho's YouTube channel on June 24, 2022, but were removed after 48 hours.

The film was marketed in Japan under the tagline "Have you become so fond of humans, Ultraman?" (そんなに人間が好きになったのか、ウルトラマン。, Son'nani ningen ga suki ni natta no ka, Urutoraman.). The tagline was a question Zōffy asked Ultraman in the Ultraman series finale and reused in the film.

=== Theatrical ===
Shin Ultraman was previously scheduled for an early 2021 summer release, but was delayed due to the COVID-19 pandemic. On May 2, 2022, the Film Classification and Rating Organization gave the film a rating of "G" (suitable for all ages) for its Japanese release. After the film's director and stars attended a red carpet event along Godzilla Street on May 9, 2022, the film was released in Japan by Toho on May 13, 2022, and later to MX4D, 4DX, and Dolby Cinema theaters on June 10, 2022. Due to the film's success, Takumi Saitoh, Masami Nagasawa, Hidetoshi Nishijima, Daiki Arioka, Akari Hayami, Koji Yamamoto, and Shinji Higuchi made a "thank you stage greeting" at a theater in Tokyo on May 25. From July 8 to 21, the film was screened alongside episode 33 of Ultraman, "The Forbidden Words", and was screened alongside episode 39, "Farewell, Ultraman", from July 22 to August 4. On July 10, 2022, an estimated 950 people attended a screening of the film at the City Cultural Center in Sukagawa as a tribute to Eiji Tsuburaya and his original 1966 series; Higuchi and Saitoh discussed the legacy of Tsuburaya's work after the screening.

Shin Ultraman had its festival premiere at the 2022 Neuchâtel International Fantastic Film Festival on July 2, 2022. It had its North America premiere at the 26th Fantasia International Film Festival on July 21, where it was packed to the 700-seat capacity, and in the United States two days later at the 21st New York Asian Film Festival, where it was also very successful. Higuchi attending both screenings; producer Tomoya Nishino also attended the latter festival screening. It was also screened at festivals in Malaysia, Singapore, Indonesia, the Philippines, Austin, Valdivia, Vienna, Sitges, Italy, Amsterdam, Chicago, Nantes, Tokyo, Hawaii (with Saitoh in attendance), Paris, Chōfu, Sydney, and New Zealand.

On August 5, Tsuburaya announced that the film would be released in 37 territories worldwide (including Asia, the Middle East, and Africa). On September 12, Variety exclusively announced that The Exchange had obtained the sales rights for North America, Europe, Latin America, Australia, New Zealand, and other remaining countries and was introducing the film to buyers at the 2022 Toronto International Film Festival. The film was theatrically released in the United Arab Emirates on September 15, 2022, opening in several cities, including Dubai, Sharjah, Al Ain, Ras Al-Khaimah, and Fujairah. In Thailand, the film was screened at the Paragon Cineplex in Siam Paragon, Bangkok on September 22. PVR Pictures distributed the film theatrically in India on September 23. In Vietnam, the film was released on September 30, in Indonesia, on October 5, and in Malaysia the following day. In Hong Kong, it was released theatrically on October 13, with Traditional Chinese subtitles. It was also released in Azerbaijan, Bahrain, Bangladesh, Brunei, Cambodia, Mongolia, Oman, Saudi Arabia, South Africa, and Turkey. In the United Kingdom, Canada, and Ireland it was released on January 11 and 12, 2023. Madman Films released the film in Australian and New Zealand cinemas on August 24, 2023.

At the 2022 Anime NYC Ultraman Connection Panel, it was announced that Fathom Events would give it a two-day limited release in the United States from January 11–12, 2023. Fathom Events and Tsuburaya subsequently reported that the film would be screened in both subtitled and dubbed versions. A screening of the film was held at Crunchyroll's Anime Frontier on December 4, to celebrate the then-upcoming U.S. release. Later, Anime News Network and Ultraman Connection disclosed that Rawly Pickens directed the dub, which features the voices of Chris Hackney, Dawn M. Bennett, John Burgmeier, Brandon McInnis, Emily Frongillo, Brook Chalmers, Matt Shipman, Theo Devaney, Kellen Goff and Christopher Sabat. From May 26–June 1, 2023, Alamo Drafthouse Cinema re-released both the subtitled and dubbed editions of Shin Ultraman across 12 of their theaters throughout the United States.

=== Home media ===
In Japan, Shin Ultraman began exclusive distribution on Amazon Prime Video on November 18, 2022. In commemoration of Tsuburaya Productions' 60th anniversary, it was released on 4K Ultra HD Blu-ray, standard Blu-ray, and DVD on April 12, 2023. In January 2023, it was announced that Cleopatra Entertainment would release the film in the United States on Blu-ray, DVD, and video on demand in spring 2023; Shin Ultraman began exclusive distribution in the United States on video on demand on July 4, while both the Japanese and English dubbed versions were released on DVD and Blu-ray on July 11.

== Reception ==
=== Box office ===
Prior to the film's release, Tsuburaya Productions estimated that the film would gross ¥8−10 billion. On its opening day in Japan (May 13, 2022), Shin Ultraman was 32nd at the box office in Japan, selling 191,302 tickets and earning ¥290,102,400. By its third day, the film had been screened at 401 theaters nationwide, sold 641,802 tickets, and grossed ¥993,410,050 ($7.68 million), becoming the most commercially successful film in the Ultraman franchise, exceeding the 2008 film Superior Ultraman 8 Brothers, and breaking the record that Higuchi's previous film, Shin Godzilla had on its third day. During its opening weekend, the film grossed $1.13 million at IMAX theaters, making it the largest opening for a live-action Japanese film in the format. By its eighth day, it had sold 1.032 million tickets and grossed ¥1.54 billion ($12.04 million). The film remained #1 at the Japanese box office, until it was overtaken by Top Gun: Maverick during its third weekend. During its fifth weekend, the film dropped to #3, behind Dragon Ball Super: Super Hero and Top Gun: Maverick, and fell to #4 the following weekend with a gross of ¥3,839,710,000 ($28.4 million). By its 45th day (June 27) the film had sold 2.69 million tickets and exceeded ¥4 billion ($30.95 million). By July 3, the film had earned an accumulative total of ¥4,165,925,800 ($30.58 million). On September 5, Crunchyroll stated that the film was the highest-grossing Japanese live-action film of 2022 until it was overtaken by Shinsuke Sato's Kingdom 2: Far and Away. Shin Ultraman was the sixth highest-grossing domestic Japanese film of 2022, having earned a total of ¥4.44 billion (roughly $33.5 million).

The film grossed $1,598 (equivalent to $1,758 in 2025) in the United Arab Emirates; $17,000 in Vietnam; $303,449 in Hong Kong; $1,534 in Turkey; $601,490 in the United States; $15,010 in Australia; and $1,513 in New Zealand. Thus, the film grossed approximately $34,441,594 worldwide.

=== Critical response ===
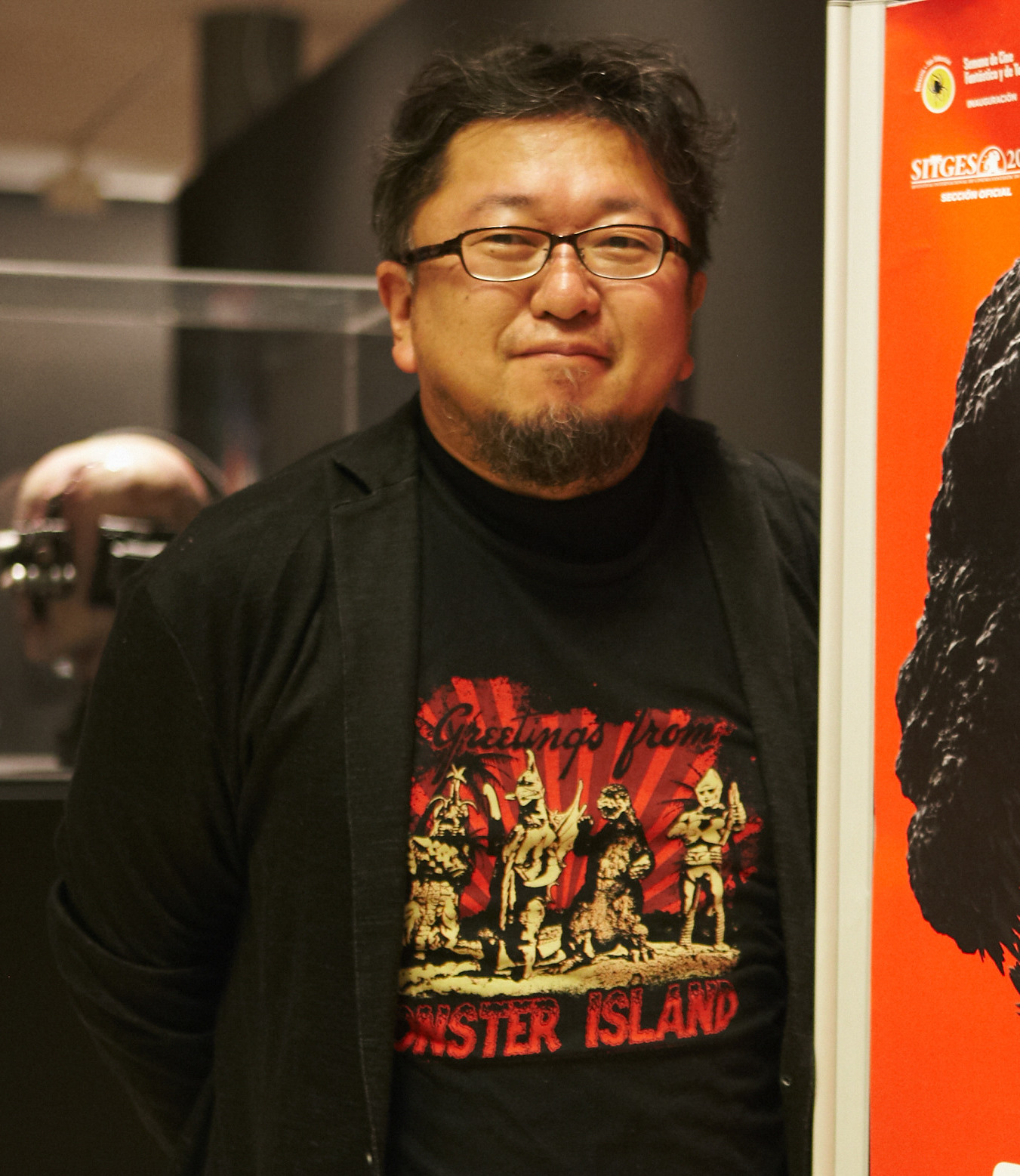
Critics were consistent in their praise for Shinji Higuchi's (pictured in 2016) direction.

Shin Ultraman garnered mostly critical acclaim worldwide, but received some mixed reviews in Japan. (Note: Attributed to multiple references:) On May 16, 2022, the online magazine FILMAGA ranked it fourth out of all Japanese films currently being screened in Japan, with an average rating of 3.81/5 based upon 11,244 reviews from review aggregator Filmarks. The film is Higuchi's highest-rated film on review aggregator Rotten Tomatoes, holding a 94% approval rating based on 31 reviews, with an average rating of 7.60/10. Metacritic, which uses a weighted average, assigned the film a score of 84/100 based on 8 critics, indicating "universal acclaim".

Anno and Higuchi were particularly fond of Ultraman and faithfully recreated Eiji Tsuburaya's 1966 series while also incorporating aspects of Shin Godzilla. Critics recognized their ambition for the film and generally found the film had achieved its goal; they especially praised Higuchi's direction, the characters, editing, cinematography, visual effects, musical score, and action sequences. Some reviewers, however, felt that it was inferior to Shin Godzilla because Anno's screenplay had an episodic structure and lacked the themes featured in that film. A few, including Tsunehira Furuya and David Stratton, also believed the film struggles to appeal to viewers unaware of Ultraman because it pays many homages, though The Asahi Shimbun and IGN's reviewers felt it would be enjoyable even if the viewer is unfamiliar with the series. Crunchyroll and Nerdist called the film a "handsome, effective, and certainly loving riff" and a "loving tribute and wholly-unique entry into this beloved series" respectively.

Both reviewers for Unseen Japan and Screen Anarchy considered the "likable" characters to be one of the reasons that the film is overall enjoyable, while a reviewer for Deccan Herald found its "bullet train-like pacing" does not "humanise Ultraman as a character". A film critic from The Nikkei recognized Asami's gigantification as one of its central intriguing aspects.

Reviewers for Anime News Network, Deccan Herald, and La Estatuilla cited the film's lack of themes as its main flaw; Matt Schley and Spencer Perry concluded it is not on par with Shin Godzilla due to its absence of criticism of Japan's government. Noah Oskow of Unseen Japan felt that the film criticizes Japan's weak government bureaucracy like its predecessor, Shin Godzilla, which was a "meditation on ruinous government inaction and gridlock, specifically serving as a harrowing metaphor for the devastating 2011 Great East Japan Earthquake and subsequent disaster at the Fukushima Daiichi Nuclear Power Plant."

=== Accolades ===
Award	Category	Recipient(s)	Result	Ref.
16th Asian Film Awards	Best Visual Effects	Atsuki Satō	Nominated	
40th Golden Gross Awards	Excellence/Silver Award	Shin Ultraman	Awarded (Note: Shared with Jujutsu Kaisen 0, Detective Conan: The Bride of Halloween, and Kingdom 2: Far and Away.)	
46th Japan Academy Film Prize	Picture of the Year	Shin Ultraman	Nominated	
46th Japan Academy Film Prize	Director of the Year	Shinji Higuchi	Nominated	
46th Japan Academy Film Prize	Best Cinematography	Osamu Ichikawa and Keizō Suzuki	Won	
46th Japan Academy Film Prize	Best Lighting Direction	Sosuke Yoshikado	Won	
46th Japan Academy Film Prize	Best Art Direction	Yuji Hayashida and Eri Sakushima	Won	
46th Japan Academy Film Prize	Best Sound Recording	Hironobu Tanaka and Haru Yamada	Nominated	
46th Japan Academy Film Prize	Best Film Editing	Yōhei Kurihara and Hideaki Anno	Nominated	
46th Japan Academy Film Prize	Newcomer of the Year	Daiki Arioka	Awarded (Note: Arioka shared the award with Karin Ono of Anime Supremacy!, Meru Nukumi of My Boyfriend in Orange, and Hokuto Matsumura of xxxHolic.)	
77th Mainichi Film Awards	Best Supporting Actor	Koji Yamamoto	Nominated	
35th Nikkan Sports Film Awards	Yūjirō Ishihara Award	Shin Ultraman	Nominated	
54th Seiun Awards	Best Media	Shin Ultraman	Won	
11th VFX-JAPAN Awards	Best Theatrical Live-Action Film	Shin Ultraman	Won	

== Other media ==
=== Collaborative projects ===
Nagoya Railroad hosted a collaborative event from April 22, 2022, to June 26, 2022, that allowed participants to collect "Ultra admission tickets" at 8 stations with the word "Shin" in their titles. There were also collaboration events from April 29 to June 30, 2022, at the Yokohama Landmark Tower with a 10-meter balloon depicting Ultraman on display and merchandise on the first floor of Landmark Plaza, as well as novelties at shops and restaurants inside the building. On June 30, 2022, Toho added Neronga and the titular hero of the film to their mobile game Godzilla Battle Line as part of the "Shin Japan Heroes Universe" collaborative project. In addition, Zetton and Alien Mefilas were introduced to the game on August 31, 2022, and were available as level-enhancing battle pieces until September 30, 2022. From July 7 to August 21, 2022, the Bandai Namco Cross Store at Yokohama World Porters in Naka-ku, Yokohama, hosted another "Shin Japan Heroes Universe" collaboration event called the "Shin Japan Heroes Amusement World". As part of a limited-time collaboration with Tsuburaya Productions' Ultraman franchise, GungHo Online Entertainment added the film's incarnations of Ultraman, Neronga, Gabora, Zarab, Mefilas, and Zetton to their mobile puzzle video game Puzzle & Dragons on July 18, 2022.

=== Books ===
The art book, Shin Ultraman Design Works (シン・ウルトラマン デザインワークス, Shin Urutoraman Dezain Wākusu), became available to purchase at theaters in Japan on May 13, 2022, distributed by Khara studio, and was released to bookstores by Ground Works on June 24, 2022. Hideaki Anno authored the book, which contains over 500 artworks, including concept art, CG models, and 3D objects. In June 2022, Poplar Publishing released Shin Ultraman Millennials Book (シン・ウルトラマン MILLENNIALS BOOK(ミレニアルズ ブック), Shin Urutoraman Mireniaruzu Bukku), a 32-page book celebrating the film's release and the 55th anniversary of the Ultraman franchise. On June 28, 2022, Kodansha released ULTRAMAN HISTORICA: From Ultra Q to Shin Ultraman (ULTRAMAN HISTORICA ウルトラQからシン・ウルトラマンまで, Urutoraman HISTORICA Urutora Kyū kara Shin Urutoraman), a mook detailing every entry in the Ultraman series for adult fans of the franchise.

=== Shin Ultra Fight ===
A spin-off miniseries entitled Shin Ultra Fight (シン・ウルトラファイト, Shin Urutora Faito), was streamed on Tsuburaya Productions' streaming service Tsuburaya Imagination from May 14 to July 4, 2022. Shin Ultraman director Shinji Higuchi partially directed and supervised the series while Hideaki Anno, the film's screenwriter, organizer, and producer, was in charge of planning. Cine Bazar, Tsuburaya Productions, Toho, and Khara co-produced the series; utterly consisting of 3D computer graphics, with three episodes repurposing footage from Shin Ultraman and seven episodes featuring computer graphics by Studio Bros, Modeling Bros, and Shirogumi. Inspired by the 1970 TV series Ultra Fight, the series attempted to duplicate the low production values of the original program by filming unscripted episodes, using motion capture performances without correction, and setting the fights in computer-generated environments situated in regular filming locations.

No.	Title	Directed by	Narrator	Original release date
1	"Neronga Comes and Goes"; Transliteration: "Neronga Detari Kietari" (Japanese: ネロンガ 出たり消えたり)	Shinji Higuchi	Koichi Yamadera	May 14, 2022
2	"A Death Blow to Gabora"; Transliteration: "Gabora Shi no Seiken Zuki" (Japanese: ガボラ 死の正拳突き)	Shinji Higuchi	Koichi Yamadera	May 14, 2022
3	"Beware! Mefilas' Trap"; Transliteration: "Ki o Tsukero! Mefirasu no Wana" (Japanese: 気をつけろ！ メフィラスの罠)	Shinji Higuchi	Koichi Yamadera	May 19, 2022
4	"Gather! Duelists of the Canyon"; Transliteration: "Atsumare! Daikyōkoku no Duerisuto" (Japanese: 集まれ！ 大峡谷の決斗者)	Kazuhiro Nakagawa	Koichi Yamadera	May 30, 2022
5	"The Flashing Match Behind Closed Doors"; Transliteration: "Senkō no Mukankyaku Jiai" (Japanese: 閃光の無観客試合)	Kensei Nakayama	Koichi Yamadera	June 6, 2022
6	"Is the Planet Burning?"; Transliteration: "Yūsei wa Moeteiru ka" (Japanese: 遊星は燃えてゐるか)	Linto Ueda	Koichi Yamadera	July 4, 2022
7	"The 6-Dimensional Scoundrel"; Transliteration: "Roku Jigen Burai" (Japanese: 6次元無頼)	Ryōtarō Kogushi	Koichi Yamadera	July 4, 2022
0	"Fi-Fi-Fight of White Sand and Green Pines"; Transliteration: "Hakusaseishō Shura Shushushu" (Japanese: 白砂青松 修羅シュシュシュ)	Norichika Ōba	Koichi Yamadera	July 4, 2022
8	"Zetton, the Chariot of Fire"; Transliteration: "Zetton Hi no Kuruma" (Japanese: ゼットン 火の車)	Shinji Higuchi	Koichi Yamadera	July 4, 2022
9	"Requiem of the Roaring Waves"; Transliteration: "Shiosai no Rekuiemu" (Japanese: 潮騒の鎮魂歌)	Norichika Ōba	Koichi Yamadera	July 4, 2022

== Potential sequels ==
In Shin Ultraman Design Works, Hideaki Anno revealed that he initially wrote a proposal for Tsuburaya Productions on January 17, 2018, proposing a trilogy of films, starting with Shin Ultraman and continuing with an untitled sequel and a remake of Ultraseven from 1967, titled Shin Ultraseven (シン・ウルトラセブン, Shin Urutorasebun). Ultraman's motion capture actor, Bin Furuya, expressed interest in making a cameo appearance in Shin Ultraseven because he played Ultra Guard member Amagi in Ultraseven, and noted: "If the public watches [the film] 5 or 6 times, there will likely be a story like Shin Ultraseven."
