= It Comes =

- Film poster
- Directed by: Tetsuya Nakashima
- Screenplay by: Tetsuya Nakashima; Hideto Iwai
- Based on: Bogiwan Ga, Kuru by Ichi Sawamura
- Produced by: Tomoya Nishino; Maki Kanehira
- Starring: Junichi Okada; Haru Kuroki; Nana Komatsu; Takako Matsu; Satoshi Tsumabuki
- Cinematography: Ryoken Okamura
- Edited by: Yoshiyuki Koike
- Music by: Yuta Bandoh; Matthew Herbert
- Production companies: Toho; Geek Sight
- Distributed by: Toho; Paramount Pictures
- Release date: December 7, 2018 (Japan)
- Running time: 135 minutes
- Country: Japan
- Language: Japanese

It Comes (Japanese: 来る, Hepburn: Kuru) is a 2018 Japanese supernatural horror film, based on a novel of the same name and directed by Tetsuya Nakashima. It stars Junichi Okada, Haru Kuroki, Nana Komatsu, Takako Matsu, and Satoshi Tsumabuki.

== Premise ==
A couple must protect their 2-year-old daughter's life from a monster called Bogiwan.

== Cast ==
- Junichi Okada as Kon Nosaki
- Nana Komatsu as Makoto Higa – Kon's girlfriend. She can communicate with ghosts.
- Satoshi Tsumabuki as Hideki Tahara
- Haru Kuroki as Kana Tahara – Hideki's wife
- Takako Matsu as Kotoko Higa – Makoto's elder sister. She also has psychic powers like her sister.
- Munetaka Aoki
- Rie Shibata
- Taiga
- Aiju Shida
- Miho Ninagawa
- Hikaru Ijūin
- Eri Ishida
