= The World of Kanako =

2014 Japanese suspense film by Tetsuya Nakashima

- Theatrical release poster
- Directed by: Tetsuya Nakashima
- Screenplay by: Tetsuya Nakashima; Nobuhiro Monma; Miako Tadano
- Based on: Hateshinaki Kawaki by Akio Fukamachi
- Produced by: Satomi Kotake; Yutaka Suzuki
- Starring: Kōji Yakusho; Nana Komatsu; Satoshi Tsumabuki; Joe Odagiri; Fumi Nikaidō; Ai Hashimoto; Asuka Kurosawa; Miki Nakatani
- Cinematography: Shoichi Ato
- Edited by: Yoshiyuki Koike
- Music by: Grand Funk Inc.
- Production company: Gaga Communications
- Distributed by: Gaga Communications; Wild Bunch
- Release dates: June 27, 2014 (Premiere); July 4, 2014 (original Japan release)
- Running time: 118 minutes
- Country: Japan
- Language: Japanese
- Box office: ¥750 million

The World of Kanako (Japanese: 渇き。, Hepburn: Kawaki.; lit. "Thirst.") is a 2014 Japanese suspense film directed by Tetsuya Nakashima, starring Kōji Yakusho and Nana Komatsu. It was released on 4 July 2014, and is based on the novel Hateshinaki Kawaki (果てしなき渇き; "Endless Thirst") by Akio Fukamachi.

== Plot ==
(The movie is told in flashbacks and time jumps. This plot will be written in chronological order)

Akikazu Fujishima (Kōji Yakusho) is a former detective who lost his job, marriage and daughter after having a violent reaction to his wife's infidelity. Since then, he has become a dysfunctional, unstable alcoholic. Many years later, his ex-wife Kiriko (Asuka Kurosawa) contacts him to tell him that his daughter Kanako (Nana Komatsu) has gone missing. Akikazu begins investigating the disappearance, with police detective Asai (Satoshi Tsumabuki) ostensibly helping but in truth rarely involving himself in the search. Akikazu's methods involve harassing and intimidating those he speaks to, including Kanako's former classmates and teacher (Miki Nakatani), but none of them are forthcoming. Nonetheless, he discovers that she had become involved with drug users, and suspects that they made her into an addict. He also shows his abusive side by raping his former wife in the apartment after being frustrated with not finding Kanako. It is also revealed that he had previously gone home drunk one night, attacked and beaten up his daughter Kanako, and after she encourages him he rapes her in anger.

Flashbacks to three years prior reveal how Sigon (Hiroya Shimizu) in Kanako's middle school had fallen in love with her, as she was the only kid who didn't bully or ostracize him. Sigon, knowing Kanako had been in love with a former student named Ogata, wanted her to feel the same way for him. This desire eventually leads him to attend a party with her, where he is tricked, drugged, tied up, raped by men while they take pictures of him, blackmailing him. Sigon tracks down Kanako a few days later and contemplates killing her after realizing Kanako is a sadistic psychopath who uses her charms to trick guys into falling in love. She embraces him, before an unidentified figure stabs Sigon in the neck, killing him.

In the present, Akikazu is eventually captured by the Yakuza, who torture and kill Kanako's gang member friend Matsunaga (Mahiro Takasugi) in front of him. Matsunaga informs Akikazu as to how Ogata was a "weak boy with a cute face" so they kidnapped him and allowed old men to rape him, which caused him to commit suicide. Kanako, having been in love with Ogata, befriended the group in order to exact revenge. Even knowing about Kanako's intentions and lack of feelings for anyone or anything, Matsunaga had fallen in love with Kanako and helped her to steal the photos. The Yakuza inform Akikazu that the police are also involved in the prostitution ring and that Detective Aikawa (Joe Odagiri) had killed several of Kanako's criminal friends in an attempt at a cover-up. They provide Akikazu with a gun and send him to Aikawa's home.

Akikazu rapes Aikawa's wife, then takes her and her son hostage to meet Aikawa. The two have a bloody fight, during which Aikawa kills his wife, but both men survive. The police, including Detective Asai, arrive on the scene, and kill Aikawa. Akikazu hits Asai with his car and escapes.

Akikazu returns to the teacher that he questioned much earlier, having realized that her daughter was one of the children being raped in Kanako's photos, and that she had killed Kanako in revenge. He forces her to dig up the grave that she buried Kanako in, but its location has been lost due to recent snowfall. While the teacher insists that his search for his daughter's body is futile and tries to escape, Akikazu continues to dig, refusing to acknowledge that his daughter is dead. The film ends as he vows to kill her himself.

== Cast ==
- Kōji Yakusho as Akikazu Fujishima
- Nana Komatsu as Kanako Fujishima
- Satoshi Tsumabuki as Detective Asai
- Joe Odagiri as Detective Aikawa
- Fumi Nikaidō as Nami Endo (Kanako's ex-middle school classmate, Apocalypse Group member)
- Hiroya Shimizu as Sigon (Kanako's ex-middle school friend)
- Hiroki Nakajima as Shimatsu (Kanako's ex-middle school classmate, bully)
- Ai Hashimoto as Emi Morishita (Kanako's high school friend)
- Asuka Kurosawa as Kiriko (Akikazu ex-wife, Kanako's mother)
- Miki Nakatani as Rie Azuma (Kanako's ex-homeroom teacher at middle school)
- Hitoshi Hoshino as Seiji Ogata (Kanako's ex-boyfriend from middle school)
- Mahiro Takasugi as Yasuhiro Matsunaga (Kanako's ex-middle school classmate, leader of Apocalypse Group)
- Jun Kunimura as Tsujimura (psychiatrist)
- Munetaka Aoki as Sakiyama (underboss of Ishimaru Gang)
- Aoi Morikawa as Tomoko Nagano (Kanako's high school friend)
- Yasuo Koh as Cho (capitalist)
- Megumi Hatachiya as Aikawa's Wife
- Daichi Watanabe as Hiroshi Kawamoto (Store Staff)
- Shouno Hayama as Blond Boy (Apocalypse Group member)

== Music ==
- César Franck - "Panis angelicus"
- Antonín Dvořák - "Song to the Moon"
- Dempagumi.inc - "Den Den Passion"
- Trippple Nippples - "LSD"
- Daoko - "FOG"
- Fusanosuke Kondo - "I Love You, OK"
- Seiko Matsuda - "Sweet Memories"
- Dean Martin - "Everybody Loves Somebody"
- Mai Yamane - "House of the Rising Sun"

== Reception ==
=== Box office ===
The film earned $1.1 million during its opening weekend, and debuted at No. 4 at the Japanese box office. It has grossed ¥377 million in Japan.

=== Critical response ===
The World of Kanako received mixed responses from critics. On the review aggregator website Rotten Tomatoes, 67% of 18 critics' reviews are positive. Metacritic, which uses a weighted average, assigned the film a score of 55 out of 100, based on 5 critics, indicating "mixed or average" reviews.

Mark Schilling of The Japan Times gave the film 3 out of 5 stars, writing that "as a thriller, Kawaki is almost comically over the top. [...] Nakashima produces quick, kaleidoscopic cuts that not only impress with their coolness, but say something about the quicksilver nature of Kanako in particular and the Dionysian spirit in general". Andy Webster of The New York Times disliked the film, calling it "remorseless, repetitious and ultimately tedious", as did Variety's Scott Tobias, who wrote the film was "a relentlessly unpleasant and ultimately banal journey into a broken family’s heart of darkness. [...] The World of Kanako doesn’t pause long enough from visceral ugliness to allow any deeper emotions to sink in".
