= Nana Komatsu =

Japanese actress and model (born 1996)

- 小松 菜奈
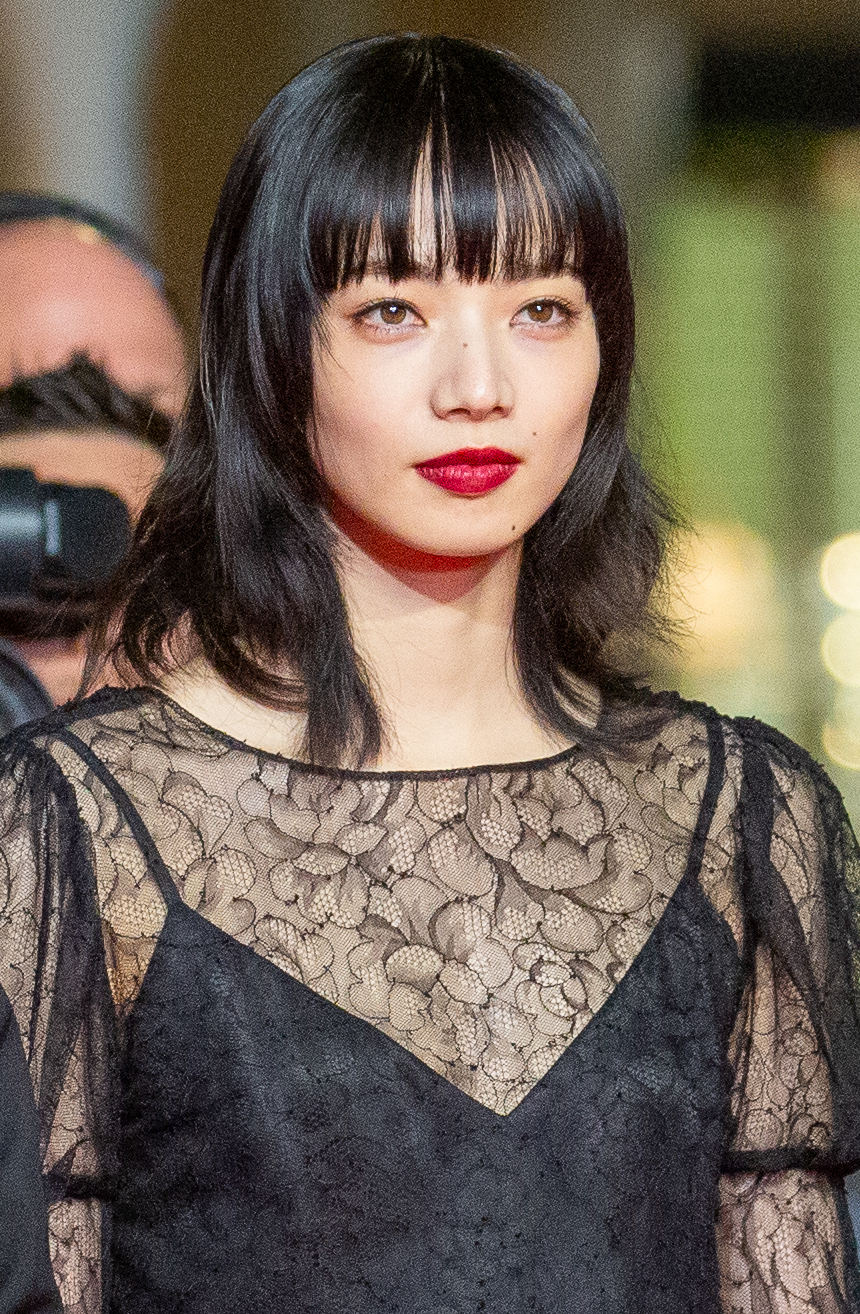
- Komatsu at the 2025 Cannes Film Festival
- Born: February 16, 1996 (age 30); Tokyo, Japan
- Occupations: Actress; model
- Hometown: Yamanashi Prefecture
- Years active: 2008–present
- Agent: Stardust Promotion
- Spouse: Masaki Suda (m. 2021)
- Children: 1
- Relatives: Kocchi no Kento (brother-in-law); Araki Sugō (brother-in-law)
- Website: stardust.co.jp

Nana Komatsu (Japanese: 小松 菜奈, Hepburn: Komatsu Nana; born February 16, 1996) is a Japanese actress and model. She is best known for starring in the films The World of Kanako (2014), Drowning Love (2016), My Tomorrow, Your Yesterday (2016), Threads: Our Tapestry of Love (2020), and The Last 10 Years (2022). She made her Hollywood debut role in the film Silence (2016).

== Early life ==
Komatsu was born on February 16, 1996 in Tokyo and grew up in Yamanashi Prefecture. Her father is from Saga Prefecture while her mother is from Okinawa. She has two older brothers.

Komatsu began dancing in third grade of elementary school and continued until her third year of junior high school, and also learned to play the flute during junior high.

== Career ==
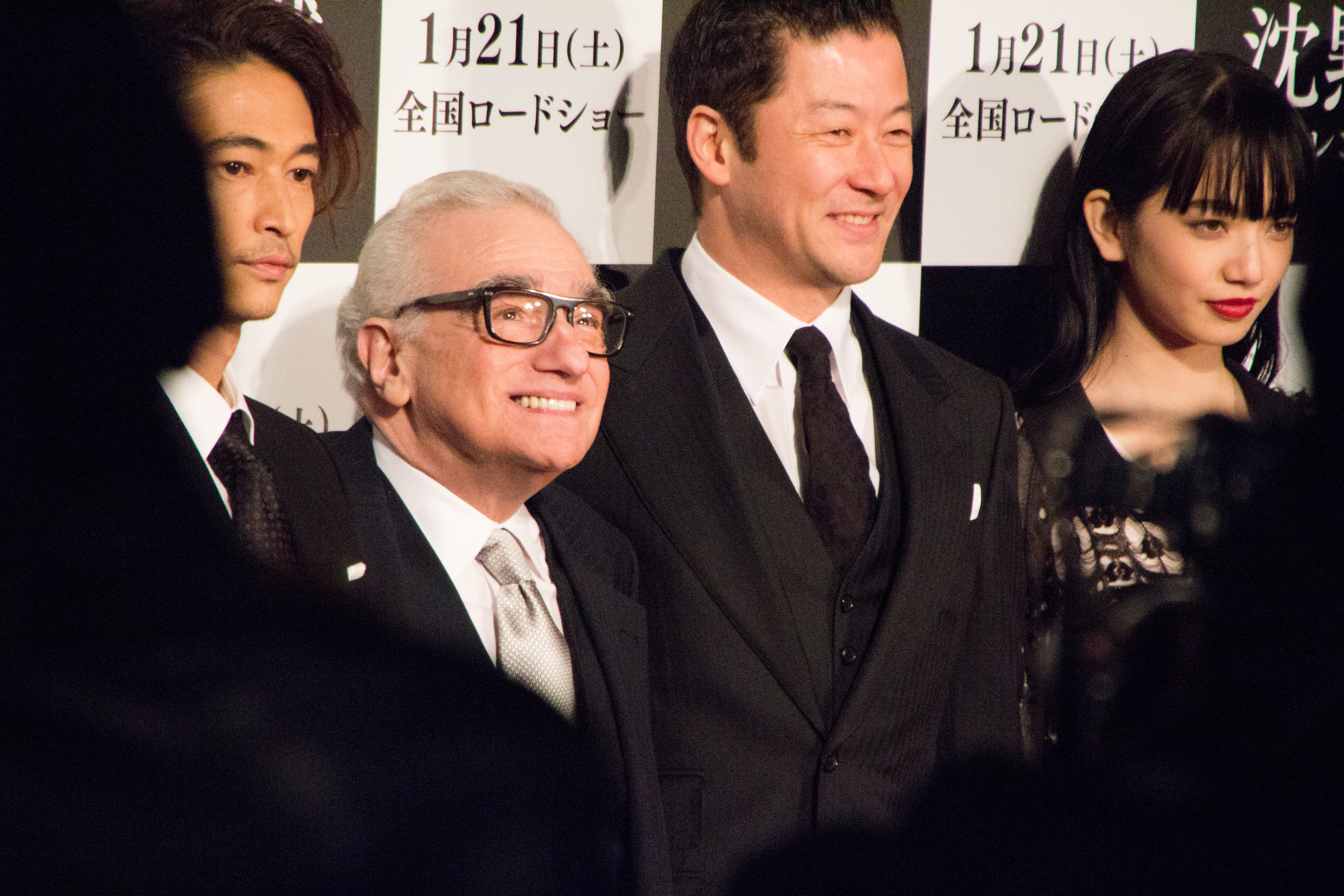
Komatsu in 2017 (far right)

Komatsu made her film debut in The World of Kanako and won numerous Best New Actress awards including the Newcomer of The Year award at the 38th Japan Academy Film Prize. She has been a House Ambassador for Chanel since 2015. She had a contract with Stardust Promotion. In 2016, she played a minor role in Martin Scorsese's film Silence.

Komatsu was nominated for Outstanding Performance by an Actress in a Supporting Role award at the 43rd Japan Academy Film Prize for her role in the film Family of Strangers. She starred in the sixth highest grossing Japanese film of 2020, Threads: Our Tapestry of Love. She was nominated in the Outstanding Performance by an Actress in a Leading Role category at the 44th Japan Academy Film Prize for her role in the film Threads: Our Tapestry of Love.

In 2021, Komatsu starred in the films Moonlight Shadow and Parasite in Love. In 2022, she starred with Kentaro Sakaguchi in the film The Last 10 Years, which had grossed over 3 billion yen and it was ranked at #8 for the highest grossing Japanese film in 2022.

In 2023, Komatsu became the face of Chanel Fall/Winter 2023/24 Ready to Wear collection, becoming the first Japanese national to be featured as a face of collection for a luxury brand.

In 2024, Komatsu starred in the mystery film Who Were We?, directed by Tetsuya Tomina. The film, which had its world premiere at the Tokyo International Film Festival in October 2023, featured Komatsu as Midori, a woman who awakens on Sado Island with amnesia. She co-starred with Ryuhei Matsuda, who also played a character suffering from memory loss.

Komatsu returned to acting in 2025 with a supporting role in the psychological horror film Exit 8, directed by Genki Kawamura and based on the popular 2023 video game of the same name. Komatsu, who co-stars with Kazunari Ninomiya, played an unnamed character referred to as "The Woman." The film had its world premiere in the Midnight Screenings section of the 2025 Cannes Film Festival on May 19, marking Komatsu's first time attending the festival. In July 2025, Komatsu was featured in the online exhibition "LA MUSEUM NANA KOMATSU," hosted by the online fashion museum, LA MUSEUM. The exhibition showcased 54 historical garments from the 1960s to the 2010s, with Komatsu acting as a "living mannequin."

Komatsu further cemented her influence in the global fashion industry by being named to The Business of Fashion's BoF 500 Class of 2025. This annual, definitive index recognizes the 500 most influential people shaping the global fashion industry.

On November 28, 2025, Komatsu was officially appointed as the newest Chanel Beauty Ambassador. This role marks an expansion of her long-standing relationship with the French luxury house, for which she has served as a House Ambassador for fashion and other lines since 2015.

== Personal life ==
Komatsu married actor Masaki Suda on November 15, 2021. They have starred in a number of films together including Threads: Our Tapestry of Love (2020). On March 9, 2024, Komatsu and Suda jointly announced through their respective agencies that they had welcomed the birth of their first child.

== Filmography ==
=== Film ===
Year	Title	Role	Notes	Ref.
2013	Tadaima	Sumire	Lead role; short film	
2014	The World of Kanako	Kanako Fujishima		
2014	Close Range Love	Yuni Kururugi		
2015	Bakuman	Miho Azuki		
2015	Prophecy	Kaede		
2016	Destruction Babies	Nana		
2016	The Black Devil and the White Prince	Yū Akahane		
2016	Silence	Mónica (Haru)	American film	
2016	Maniac Hero	Kaori Terasawa		
2016	My Tomorrow, Your Yesterday	Emi Fukuju	Lead role	
2016	Drowning Love	Natsume Mochizuki	Lead role	
2017	JoJo's Bizarre Adventure: Diamond Is Unbreakable Chapter I	Yukako Yamagishi		
2017	There Is No Tomorrow	Herself	Lead role; short film	
2018	Kids on the Slope	Ritsuko Mukae		
2018	After the Rain	Akira Tachibana	Lead role	
2018	It Comes	Makoto Higa		
2019	Samurai Marathon	Princess Yuki	Japanese-British film	
2019	Farewell Song	Leo	Lead role	
2019	Family of Strangers	Yuki Shimazaki		
2020	Sakura	Miki Hasegawa	Lead role	
2020	Threads: Our Tapestry of Love	Aoi Sonoda	Lead role	
2021	Moonlight Shadow	Satsuki	Lead role	
2021	Parasite in Love	Hijiri Sanagi	Lead role	
2022	The Last 10 Years	Matsuri Takabayashi	Lead role	
2024	Who Were We?	Midori	Lead role	
2025	Exit 8	The Woman		

=== Television ===
Year	Title	Role	Notes	Ref.
2015	To Give a Dream	Yuko Abe	Lead role; miniseries	
2016	The Kodai Family	Yūko	Lead role; miniseries	
2017	Thrill: Red Chapter	Hitomi Nakano	Lead role; miniseries	
2017	Thrill: Black Chapter	Hitomi Nakano	Miniseries	
2018	After the Rain: Wish in a Pocket	Akira Tachibana	Miniseries	

=== Music videos ===
Year	Song	Artist	Notes	Ref.
2011	Ai to Iu	Plenty		
2011	Kimi to Hitsuji to Ao	Radwimps		
2012	Convenience Honeymoon	Chatmonchy		
2012	Collateral Damage	Shiina Ringo		
2014	Goodtime	SALU		
2014	Snow Smile	Shota Shimizu	co-starring with Kentaro Ito	
2015	Yeah! Yeah! Yeah!	Androp	CM song for Mitsuya Cider	
2016	Farewell Song	never young beach		
2016	Spoiled Innocence (天真有邪)	Yoga Lin	Taiwanese MV	
2017	Something Just Like This	The Chainsmokers ft. Coldplay	video produced by Genki Kawamura	
2017	Hanacherie	Nissy		
2018	Sokkenai	Radwimps	co-starring with Fūju Kamio	
2018	Metro	Juju		
2019	Goodbye Kiss (さよならくちびる)	HaruLeo	Duo band with Mugi Kadowaki as HaruLeo for the movie Farewell Song.	
2020	Ain't Nobody Know	Gen Hoshino		
2020	Ima Aini Iku (今 逢いに行く)	Uru		
2020	Rollerskates	End of the World	filmed in New York in 2019	
2021	Odoriko (踊り子)	Vaundy		
2022	Ms. Phenomenal (うるうびと)	Radwimps	OST for the movie The Last 10 Years	
2022	Hachigatsu wa my name (八月は僕の名前)	Quruli		
2023	rose	KID FRESINO		
2024	Who Were We?	Yojiro Noda	OST for the movie Who Were We?	
2025	It's a small world	King Gnu	Special movie for Nomura Real Estate's "Proud" project	

== Awards and nominations ==
Year	Award	Category	Nominated work(s)	Result	Ref.
2014	39th Hochi Film Awards	Best New Artist	The World of Kanako	Won	
2015	38th Japan Academy Film Prize	Newcomer of the Year	The World of Kanako	Won	
2015	69th Mainichi Film Awards	Sponichi Grand Prix Best Newcomer	The World of Kanako	Won	
2016	8th Tama Film Awards	Best New Actress	Bakuman, Destruction Babies and others	Won	
2016	41st Hochi Film Awards	Best Actress	The Black Devil and the White Prince, Drowning Love	Nominated	
2016	29th Nikkan Sports Film Awards	Best Newcomer	Destruction Babies, Drowning Love	Nominated	
2017	38th Yokohama Film Festival	Best Newcomer	Destruction Babies	Won	
2017	90th Kinema Junpo Awards	Best New Actress	Destruction Babies, Maniac Hero and others	Won	
2018	ELLE Style Awards Taiwan	Best International Style Celebrity	Herself	Won	
2019	18th New York Asian Film Festival	Rising Star Award	Samurai Marathon	Won	
2019	44th Hochi Film Awards	Best Supporting Actress	It Comes, Family of Strangers	Won	
2020	41st Yokohama Film Festival	Best Actress	Farewell Song	Won	
2020	62nd Blue Ribbon Awards	Best Supporting Actress	Samurai Marathon, Family of Strangers	Nominated	
2020	43rd Japan Academy Film Prize	Best Supporting Actress	Family of Strangers	Nominated	
2020	45th Hochi Film Awards	Best Actress	Threads: Our Tapestry of Love	Nominated	
2020	Vogue Japan	Women of the Year 2020	Herself	Won	
2021	44th Japan Academy Film Prize	Best Actress	Threads: Our Tapestry of Love	Nominated	
2021	30th Japanese Professional Movie Awards	Best Actress	Threads: Our Tapestry of Love, Sakura	Won	
2022	47th Hochi Film Awards	Best Actress	The Last 10 Years	Nominated	
2023	65th Blue Ribbon Awards	Best Actress	The Last 10 Years	Nominated	
