= Hidden Fortress: The Last Princess =

- Theatrical release poster
- Directed by: Shinji Higuchi
- Written by: Kazuki Nakashima
- Based on: The Hidden Fortress by: Akira Kurosawa; Ryūzō Kikushima; Hideo Oguni; Shinobu Hashimoto
- Produced by: Minami Ichikawa; Seiji Okuda; Shōgo Tomiyama
- Starring: Jun Matsumoto; Masami Nagasawa; Hiroshi Abe; Kippei Shiina; Daisuke Miyagawa
- Cinematography: Shoji Ehara
- Edited by: Sōichi Ueno
- Music by: Naoki Satō
- Production companies: Toho; Cine Bazar
- Distributed by: Toho
- Release date: 10 May 2008 (Japan)
- Running time: 118 minutes
- Country: Japan
- Language: Japanese
- Box office: ¥930 million ($8.5 million)

Hidden Fortress: The Last Princess (Japanese: 隠し砦の三悪人 THE LAST PRINCESS(ザ ラスト プリンセス), Hepburn: Kakushitoride no Sanakunin: Za Rasuto Purinsesu; lit. 'The Three Villains of the Hidden Fortress: The Last Princess') is a 2008 Japanese film directed by Shinji Higuchi. A remake of the 1958 Akira Kurosawa film The Hidden Fortress, it was released on 10 May 2008.

== Plot ==
Makabe Rokurota (Hiroshi Abe), a loyal retainer of Princess Yuki (Masami Nagasawa), has been commissioned to transport Yuki and Akizuki's ample treasury of gold bars safely to the politically stable Hayakawa. They disguise themselves as humble firewood peddlers, hiding the gold bars inside the logs they are carrying so as to pass safely through roadblocks set up by Yamana, which is under the control of Takayama Gyobu (Kippei Shiina), whose attire bears a striking resemblance to that of Darth Vader.

Along the way, Rokurota comes across Takezo (Jun Matsumoto) and Shimpachi (Daisuke Miyagawa), who have escaped from forced labor in a gold mine. Takezo and Shimpachi first frown on joining the journey, but eventually agree to help out in the hope of escaping Yamana's oppression and cashing in on the gold reward Rokurota offers them.

== Cast ==
- Jun Matsumoto as Takezo
- Masami Nagasawa as Princess Yuki
- Hiroshi Abe as Makabe Rokurota
- Kippei Shiina as Takayama Kyobu
- Daisuke Miyagawa as Shinpachi
- Masahiro Kōmoto as Sagawa
- Masahiro Takashima as Honjo
- Jun Kunimura as Nagakura
- Kreva as Kyobu's Samurai
- Manami Kurose as Mitsu
- Katsuhisa Namase as gambler
- Arata Furuta as slave trader
- Takaya Kamikawa as Captain

== Production ==
Principal photography began on 1 November 2007. Filming locations included Mount Aso, Kumamoto Castle, Ibaraki Prefecture, and Shizuoka Prefecture.

== Release ==
The film premiered on 17 April 2008 at the Tokyo Dome City Hall, and was released theatrically in Japan on 10 May 2008. An early screening was held on 27 April 2018 at the University of Southern California in Los Angeles, garnering positive reactions from the audience. It was screened at the Cannes Film Festival on 14 May 2008.

The Last Princess was released on DVD on 12 December 2008 in Japan. It charted at number four on the Oricon DVD chart.

On 28 June 2010 it was released in the United Kingdom and Ireland on DVD by 4Digital Asia.
