= Enban Sensō Bankid =

- 円盤戦争バンキッド
- Starring: Eiji Okuda; Tomohiro Tanabe; Tatsuyuki Tsuji; Akinori Umezu; Yoshie Suzuki; Hiroshi Yagyu; Toki Shiozawa; Masami Shimojo; Akihiko Hirata; Kiyoshi Kobayashi (voice)
- Narrated by: Ryo Kurosawa
- Theme music composer: Kenjiro Hirose
- Opening theme: Kakero Bankid by Shozo Tenma
- Ending theme: Yume no Yuujou Hikou by Shozo Tenma
- Composer: Kenjiro Hirose
- Country of origin: Japan
- No. of episodes: 26

Production
- Running time: 30 minutes per episode
- Production company: Toho

Original release
- Network: Nippon Television
- Release: 3 October 1976 – 23 March 1977

Enban Sensou Bankid (円盤戦争バンキッド, Enban Sensō Bankiddo) is the title of a tokusatsu series produced by Toho. The series, consisting of 26 episodes, is a result of joint production with Nippon Television, and aired in Japan starting on October 3, 1976 until the 23 March 1977.

This was Toho's first direct answer to the Super Sentai series (particularly the first series, Himitsu Sentai Gorenger, which was still running on TV Asahi at the time), in that this series has five color-coded superheroes (a red leader, blue, pink, and two yellows). In this series, a team of five kids (a teenage boy, a teenage girl, and three young boys, two of whom are siblings), form the top-secret "Bankid" superhero team ("Bankid" is derived from the Japanese word "enban" - "saucer"), to fight the evil Bukimi Aliens ("bukimi" - Japanese for "weird," "eerie"), led by the mysterious Commander Guzare, who plots to invade Earth.

This series is also notable in that veteran designer Tohl Narita (the designer of Ultraman, Ultra Seven, the Gargantuas, etc.) designed the Bukimi Aliens, starting with Episode #6.

== Cast ==
- Noboru Tenma (天馬昇) / Bankid Pegasus (バンキッドペガサス): Eiji Okuda
- Ryuuichi Uzaki (宇崎龍一) / Bankid Dragon (バンキッドドラゴン): Tomohiro Tanabe
- Ryuuji Uzaki (宇崎龍二) / Bankid Rabbit (バンキッドラビット): Tatsuyuki Tsuji
- Ichiro Ushijima (牛島一郎) / Bankid Ox (バンキッドオックス): Akinori Umezu
- Honoka Shiratori (白鳥ほのか) / Bankid Swan (バンキッドスワン): Yoshie Suzuki
- Hirohiko Uzaki (宇崎博彦): Hiroshi Yagyu
- Tokie Uzaki (宇崎とき枝): Toki Shiozawa
- Isao Uzaki (宇崎巌): Masami Shimojo
- Commander Guzare (グザレ司令): Akihiko Hirata / voice: Kiyoshi Kobayashi
- Narrator (ナレーター): Ryo Kurosawa
