= Shinji Higuchi =

Japanese film director (born 1965)

- 樋口 真嗣
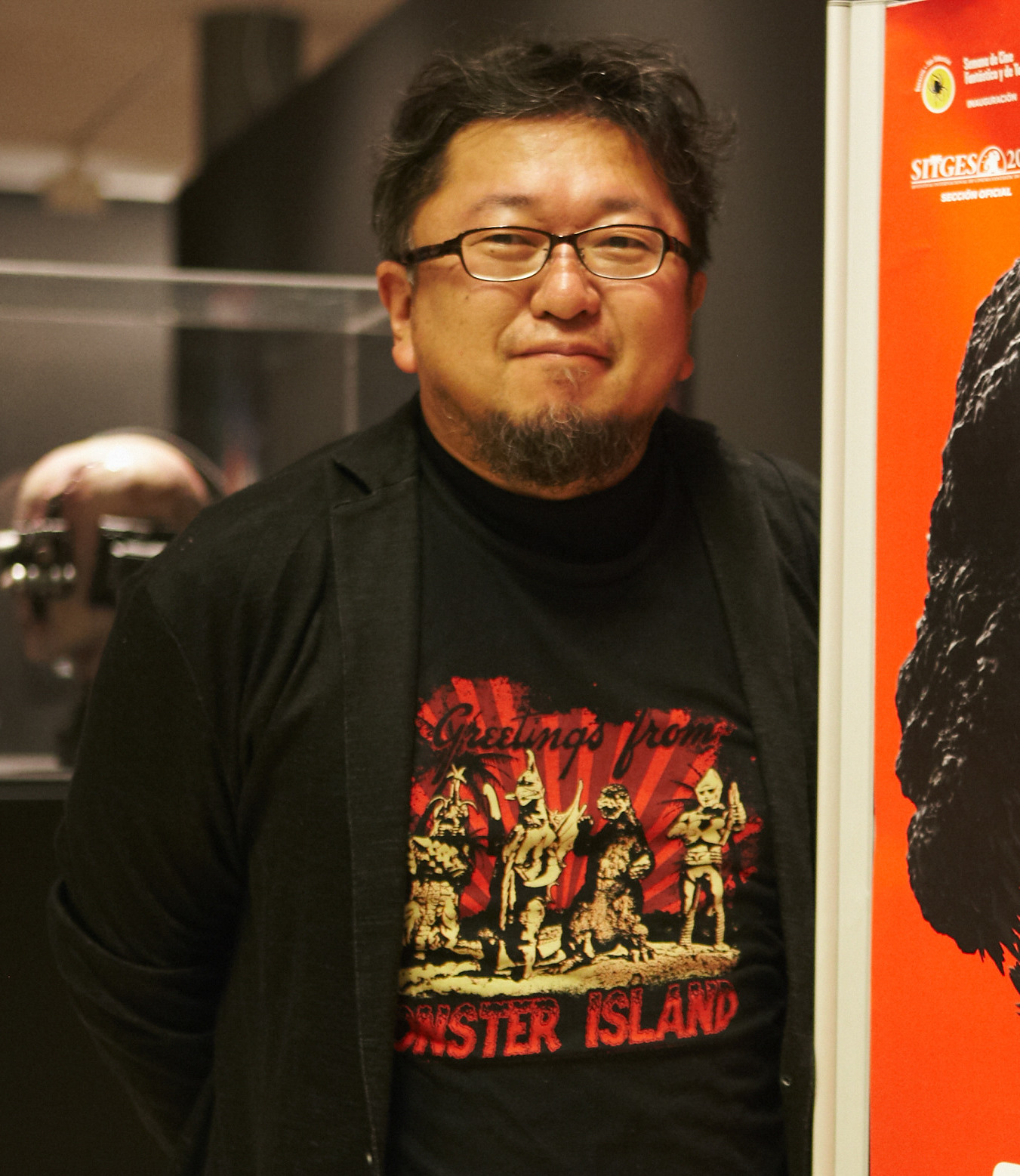
- Higuchi in 2016
- Born: September 22, 1965 (age 60); Shinjuku, Tokyo, Japan
- Occupations: Film director; special effects director; screenwriter; storyboard artist
- Years active: 1984–present
- Notable work: Gamera: Guardian of the Universe; Neon Genesis Evangelion; Sinking of Japan; Attack on Titan; Shin Godzilla; Shin Ultraman

Shinji Higuchi (Japanese: 樋口 真嗣, Hepburn: Higuchi Shinji; born September 22, 1965) is a Japanese filmmaker. Known for his tokusatsu blockbusters, Higuchi is considered one of Japan's leading filmmakers of the 21st century.

Higuchi became known for his work on Gamera: Guardian of the Universe, for which he won the Special Technology Award at the 19th Japan Academy Film Prize. In 2005, he made his feature directorial debut on Lorelei: The Witch of the Pacific Ocean. His second feature film, Sinking of Japan (2006), was second place at the Bunshun Kiichigo Awards. His 2015 live-action two-part film adaptation of Hajime Isayama's manga series, Attack on Titan, won the Excellence in Theatrical Live Action Film award at the 2016 VFX-JAPAN Awards. In 2017, Higuchi and Hideaki Anno won the Director of the Year award at the 40th Japan Academy Film Prize for their work on the 2016 kaiju film Shin Godzilla. His 2022 film, Shin Ultraman, was a major success in Japan, and has received generally positive reviews from critics internationally.

== Biography ==
=== Early life ===
Higuchi was born on September 22, 1965, in Shinjuku, Tokyo, Japan. When Higuchi was in junior high school, his aunt took him on a tour of Toho Studios, where she worked on commercials. Upon watching Toho's special effects crew at work, Higuchi became inspired and frequently visited the filming sets.

In 2019, Higuchi told French interviewers about his education: "At the end of high school, when I had to pass the entrance examinations to universities, I failed everything. But since I was in a very popular high school, the school leaders refused to let me leave empty-handed! [laughs] So they said to me: 'you have to pass an exam, any!' I ended up passing my entrance examination for the Japanese Post Office, as a civil servant. I was sorted, locked up in a warehouse."

=== Early career ===
Higuchi entered the Japanese film industry in 1984, working as an assistant modeler on The Return of Godzilla. Two years later, he directed the special effects for Daicon's tokusatsu fan film Yamata no Orochi no Gyakushū.

As a key Daicon/Gainax member, he played an important part in the creation of one of the most popular anime series, Neon Genesis Evangelion (1995). He was a writer and art director/storyboarder for the series. He was also the namesake for the show's protagonist, Shinji Ikari. He later voice-acted a musician modeled after himself in two episodes of Karekano.

Higuchi made his directorial debut in 1992 with the disaster film The Day the Sun Fissured: The Great Tokyo Earthquake, which he produced for Tokyo Fire Department.

=== Personal affairs ===
Higuchi supports Japan's whaling and consumptions of whale meat in general, and has appeared in a 2023 pro-whaling documentary film by Keiko Yagi, the director of the 2015 film Behind The Cove. The 2023 documentary featured the pro-whaling claim to highlight the necessity of whaling to control the marine ecosystem to prevent declines of fish stocks by whales, which largely affected public opinion regards the issues in Japan. The Fisheries Agency of Japan withdrew the claim in 2009 at the annual meeting of International Whaling Commission, but didn't correct it domestically afterwards. Yagi and Higuchi remarked that "Godzilla is closely connected to whales and environmental issues in naming of the character and other aspects", (Note: Production of the 1954 film involved several whale-related aspects; Godzilla's name was based on the nickname of the man who loved whale meats, and early ideas of the monster were a giant octopus to attack a whaling vessel in Indian Ocean, or a gigantic whale monster attacks Tokyo. Godzilla favors to prey on whales, and Godzilla and Godzilla Junior were depicted either to prey on or slaughter whales in Ghidorah, the Three-Headed Monster and Godzilla vs. Destoroyah respectively. Additionally, MV Brigitte Bardot owned by Sea Shepherd Conservation Society was at one point named MV Godzilla with a paint of Godzilla on it, and the vessel was used for anti-whaling activities against Japan by the NPO.) and expressed their supports for whaling and skeptical views towards veganism.

== Filmography ==
Year	Title	Director	SFX director	Storyboard artist	Notes	Ref(s)
1984	The Return of Godzilla	No	No	No	Assistant modeler	
1985	Yamata no Orochi no Gyakushū	No	Yes	No		
1987	Royal Space Force: The Wings of Honnêamise	No	No	No	Assistant director	
1988	Tokyo: The Last Megalopolis	No	No	Yes		
1988	Gunbuster	No	No	Yes		
1990	Nadia: The Secret of Blue Water	Yes	No	Yes	Director of episodes 23–39	
1991	The Cat	No	Yes	No	One scene only; uncredited	
1991	Mikadroid	No	Yes	No		
1992	The Day the Sun Fissured: The Great Tokyo Earthquake	Yes	No	No		
1994	Giant Robo: The Day the Earth Stood Still	No	No	Yes		
1995	Gamera: Guardian of the Universe	No	Yes	No		
1995	Neon Genesis Evangelion	No	No	Yes	Also screenwriter	
1996	Space Ship Remnant 6	No	Yes	No		
1996	Gamera 2: Attack of Legion	No	Yes	No		
1997	The End of Evangelion	No	Yes	No		
1998	Love & Pop	No	Yes	No		
1999	Gamera 3: Revenge of Iris	No	Yes	No		
1999	Betterman	No	No	Yes		
2000	Sakuya: Slayer of Demons	No	Yes	No		
2001	Pistol Opera	No	Yes	No		
2001	Godzilla, Mothra and King Ghidorah: Giant Monsters All-Out Attack	No	No	Yes	Uncredited	
2001	The Princess Blade	No	Yes	No		
2003	Pokémon: Jirachi—Wish Maker	No	No	Yes		
2003	Dino Crisis 3	No	No	Yes		
2003	Dragon Head	No	No	No	Visual effects designer	
2003	Kill Bill: Vol. 1	No	No	No	Production co-ordinator	
2005	Lorelei: The Witch of the Pacific Ocean	Yes	Yes	No		
2006	Sinking of Japan	Yes	No	No		
2006	Onimusha	No	No	Yes		
2007	Evangelion: 1.0 You Are (Not) Alone	No	No	Yes		
2008	Hidden Fortress: The Last Princess	Yes	No	Yes		
2009	Evangelion: 2.0 You Can (Not) Advance	No	No	Yes		
2010	Monster Magnitude: 9	Yes	No	No	Screenwriter	
2012	Giant God Warrior Appears in Tokyo	Yes	No	No		
2012	The Floating Castle	Yes	No	No		
2012	Evangelion: 3.0 You Can (Not) Redo	No	No	Yes		
2013	Kill la Kill	No	No	Yes		
2014	Garm Wars: The Last Druid	No	No	Yes		
2015	Attack on Titan	Yes	No	No		
2015	Attack on Titan: End of the World	Yes	No	No		
2016	Shin Godzilla	Yes	Yes	Yes		
2018	Dragon Pilot: Hisone and Masotan	Yes	No	Yes	Original story	
2020	The 12 Day Tale of the Monster that Died in 8	No	No	No	Original story	
2021	Evangelion: 3.0+1.0 Thrice Upon a Time	No	No	Yes		
2022	Ribbon	No	Yes	No		
2022	Shin Ultraman	Yes	No	Yes	Camera operator	
2022	Kamen Rider Black Sun	No	No	No	Visual concept designer	
2023	Baian the Assassin, M.D.	No	No	No	Trailer creator	
2023	Baian the Assassin, M.D. 2	No	No	No	Trailer creator	
2023	Kyrie	No	No	No	Actor	
2024	Brush of the God	No	No	No	Actor	
2025	Bullet Train Explosion	Yes	No	Yes	Title sequence creator	

== Accolades ==
Award ceremony	Year	Work(s)	Category	Result	Note(s)	Ref.
Japan Academy Film Prize	1996	Gamera: Guardian of the Universe	Special Technology	Won		
Japan Academy Film Prize	2013	The Floating Castle	Director of the Year	Nominated	With Isshin Inudo	
Japan Academy Film Prize	2017	Shin Godzilla	Director of the Year	Won	With Hideaki Anno	
Line News Awards	2022		Cultural Person	Won		
46th Japan Academy Film Prize	2023	Shin Ultraman	Director of the Year	Nominated		
