= Nikkan Sports Film Award for Best Supporting Actor =

Annual Japanese film award

- Awarded for: Best Performance by a Supporting Actor
- Country: Japan
- Presented by: Nikkan Sports
- First award: 1988
- Website: www.nikkansports.com/entertainment/award/ns-cinema/top-ns-cinema.html

The Nikkan Sports Film Award for Best Supporting Actor is an award given at the Nikkan Sports Film Award.

== List of winners ==
No.	Year	Actor	Film(s)
1	1988	Hiroyuki Sanada	Kaitō Ruby
2	1989	Eiji Bandō	Buddies
3	1990	Hidetaka Yoshioka	Tora-san, My Uncle
4	1991	Masatoshi Nagase	My Sons
5	1992	Takehiro Murata	Okoge
6	1993	Ken Tanaka	Bōkyō
7	1994	Masahiko Tsugawa	Shūdan Sasen; Crest of Betrayal
8	1995	Hitoshi Ueki	Ashita
9	1996	Tetsuya Watari	Waga Kokoro no Ginga Tetudō Miyazawa Kenji Monogatari
10	1997	Masahiko Nishimura	Marutai no Onna; Welcome Back, Mr. McDonald
11	1998	Ren Osugi	Hana-bi
12	1999	Kippei Shiina	Jubaku: Spellbound
13	2000	Tetsurō Tamba	15 Sai Gakkō IV
14	2001	Tsutomu Yamazaki	Go
15	2002	Teruyuki Kagawa	Out; KT; Man Walking on Snow
16	2003	Bunta Sugawara	Watashi no Guranpa
17	2004	Nakamura Shidō II	Be with You
18	2005	Shinichi Tsutsumi	Always Sanchōme no Yūhi; Fly, Daddy, Fly
19	2006	Takao Osawa	Chikatetsu ni Notte
20	2007	Takashi Sasano	Love and Honor
21	2008	Masato Sakai	Climber's High; After School
22	2009	Tomokazu Miura	The Unbroken
23	2010	Goro Inagaki	13 Assassins
24	2011	Toshiyuki Nishida	Detective in the Bar
25	2012	Mirai Moriyama	Kita no Kanariatachi
26	2013	Lily Franky	The Devil's Path; Like Father, Like Son
27	2014	Sosuke Ikematsu	Umi o Kanjiru Toki; Pale Moon; Bokutachi no Kazoku
28	2015	Masahiro Motoki	The Emperor in August
29	2016	Satoshi Tsumabuki	Rage; Museum
30	2017	Kōji Yakusho	Sekigahara; The Third Murder
31	2018	Issey Takahashi	Recall; Million Dollar Man; The Lies She Loved
32	2019	Kiyohiko Shibukawa	Another World; We Are Little Zombies; Family of Strangers
33	2020	Satoshi Tsumabuki	The Asadas; Shape of Red; I Never Shot Anyone
34	2021	Ryohei Suzuki	Last of the Wolves; Baragaki: Unbroken Samurai; The Mole Song: Final
35	2022	Tasuku Emoto	Anime Supremacy! Riverside Mukolitta; No Place to Go
36	2023	Hayato Isomura	The Moon (Ab)normal Desire; The Dry Spell; Ripples; Hard Days
37	2024	Tatsuya Fuji	Great Absence
38	2025	Min Tanaka	Kokuho
