= 38th Yokohama Film Festival =

2017 film festival in Yokohama, Japan

- Location: Yokohama, Kanagawa, Japan
- Founded: 1980
- Festival date: 2017

The 38th Yokohama Film Festival (第38回ヨコハマ映画祭) was held on 5 February 2017 in Yokohama, Kanagawa, Japan.

== Awards ==
- Best Film: - In This Corner of the World
- Best Director: Ryōta Nakano - Her Love Boils Bathwater
- Yoshimitsu Morita Memorial Best New Director:
  - Tetsuya Mariko - Destruction Babies
  - Yasukazu Sugiyama - Something Like, Something Like It
- Best Screenplay: Ryōta Nakano - Her Love Boils Bathwater
- Best Cinematographer: Yasuyuki Sasaki - Destruction Babies
- Best Actor:
  - Tomokazu Miura - The Katsuragi Murder Case
  - Yūya Yagira - Destruction Babies
- Best Actress: Mariko Tsutsui - Harmonium
- Best Supporting Actor: Masaki Suda - Destruction Babies
- Best Supporting Actress: Hana Sugisaki - Her Love Boils Bathwater
- Best Newcomer:
  - Taiga - Harmonium
  - Nana Komatsu - Destruction Babies
  - Nijirō Murakami - Destruction Babies
- Examiner Special Award: Non - In This Corner of the World
- Special Grand Prize: Hideaki Anno - Shin Godzilla

== Top 10 ==
1. In This Corner of the World
2. Her Love Boils Bathwater
3. Destruction Babies
4. Shin Godzilla
5. The Long Excuse
6. Harmonium
7. Rage
8. Satoshi: A Move for Tomorrow
9. The Katsuragi Murder Case
10. Your Name

runner-up: A Bride for Rip Van Winkle
