= 40th Japan Academy Film Prize =

Japanese film awards in 2017

- Date: March 3, 2017
- Site: Grand Prince Hotel New Takanawa, Tokyo, Japan
- Hosted by: Toshiyuki Nishida; Sakura Ando

Highlights
- Best Picture: Shin Godzilla
- Most awards: Shin Godzilla (7)
- Most nominations: Shin Godzilla (11)

The 40th Japan Academy Film Prize (第40回日本アカデミー賞) is the 40th edition of the Japan Academy Film Prize, an award presented by the Nippon Academy-Sho Association to award excellence in filmmaking. It awarded the best films of 2016 and took place on March 3, 2017 at the Grand Prince Hotel New Takanawa in Tokyo, Japan.

== Winners and nominees ==
Picture of the Year	Animation of the Year
Shin Godzilla; Rage; What a Wonderful Family!; Her Love Boils Bathwater; 64: Part I	In This Corner of the World; Your Name; A Silent Voice; Rudolf the Black Cat; One Piece Film: Gold
Director of the Year	Screenplay of the Year
Hideaki Anno and Shinji Higuchi – Shin Godzilla; Makoto Shinkai – Your Name; Takahisa Zeze – 64: Part I; Ryōta Nakano – Her Love Boils Bathwater; Lee Sang-il – Rage	Makoto Shinkai – Your Name; Ryōta Nakano – Her Love Boils Bathwater; Shinichi Hisamatsu and Takahisa Zeze – 64: Part I; Yoji Yamada and Emiko Hiramatsu – What a Wonderful Family!; Lee Sang-il – Rage
Outstanding Performance by an Actor in a Leading Role	Outstanding Performance by an Actress in a Leading Role
Kōichi Satō – 64: Part I; Gō Ayano – Twisted Justice; Junichi Okada – Fueled: The Man They Called Pirate; Hiroki Hasegawa – Shin Godzilla; Kenichi Matsuyama – Satoshi: A Move for Tomorrow	Rie Miyazawa – Her Love Boils Bathwater; Shinobu Otake – Black Widow Business; Haru Kuroki – A Bride for Rip Van Winkle; Suzu Hirose – Chihayafuru: Kami no Ku; Aoi Miyazaki – Rage
Outstanding Performance by an Actor in a Supporting Role	Outstanding Performance by an Actress in a Supporting Role
Satoshi Tsumabuki – Rage; Takehara Pistol – The Long Excuse; Masahiro Higashide – Satoshi: A Move for Tomorrow; Mirai Moriyama – Rage; Lily Franky – Scoop!	Hana Sugisaki – Her Love Boils Bathwater; Satomi Ishihara – Shin Godzilla; Mikako Ichikawa – Shin Godzilla; Suzu Hirose – Rage; Aoi Miyazaki – Birthday Card
Outstanding Achievement in Music	Outstanding Achievement in Cinematography
Radwimps – Your Name; Kotringo – In This Corner of the World; Shirou Sagisu – Shin Godzilla; Naoki Satō – Fueled: The Man They Called Pirate; Takatsugu Muramatsu – 64: Part I	Kousuke Yamada – Shin Godzilla; Norimichi Kasamatsu – Rage; Kōichi Saitō – 64: Part I; Kōzō Shibasaki – Fueled: The Man They Called Pirate; Masashi Chikamori – The Magnificent Nine
Outstanding Achievement in Lighting Direction	Outstanding Achievement in Art Direction
Takayuki Kawabe – Shin Godzilla; Yuuki Nakamura – Rage; Akinaga Tomiyama – 64: Part I; Nariyuki Ueda – Fueled: The Man They Called Pirate; Koichi Watanabe – What a Wonderful Family!	Yuji Hayashida and Eri Sakushima – Shin Godzilla; Toshihiro Isomi – 64: Part I; Tomoko Kurata – What a Wonderful Family!; Yuji Tsuzuki and Fumiko Sakahara – Rage; Takayuki Nitta – The Magnificent Nine
Outstanding Achievement in Sound Recording	Outstanding Achievement in Film Editing
Jun Nakamura and Haru Yamada – Shin Godzilla; Kazumi Kishida – What a Wonderful Family!; Mitsugu Shiratori – Rage; Shinya Takada – 64: Part I; Kenichi Fujimoto – Fueled: The Man They Called Pirate	Hideaki Anno and Atsuki Sato – Shin Godzilla; Iwao Ishii – What a Wonderful Family!; Tsuyoshi Imai – Rage; Ryo Hayano – 64: Part I; Ryūji Miyajima – Fueled: The Man They Called Pirate
Outstanding Foreign Language Film	Newcomer of the Year
Sully; The Martian; Zootopia; Star Wars: The Force Awakens; The Revenant	Given to multiple actors: Hana Sugisaki – Her Love Boils Bathwater; Mitsuki Takahata – Evergreen Love; Kanna Hashimoto – Sailor Suit and Machine Gun: Graduation; Takanori Iwata – Evergreen Love; Kentaro Sakaguchi – 64: Part I & 64: Part II; Takara Sakumoto – Rage; Yudai Chiba – The Magnificent Nine; Mackenyu Maeda – Chihayafuru: Kami no Ku and Chihayafuru: Shimo no Ku
