= My Grandpa =

- Film poster
- Directed by: Yōichi Higashi
- Screenplay by: Yōichi Higashi
- Based on: Watashi no Guranpa by Yasutaka Tsutsui
- Produced by: Tōru Ishii; Junichi Kimura; Yoshitaka Hori; Tetsujiro Yamagami; Mitsuru Kurosawa; Atsushi Sugai; Jun Kaji
- Starring: Bunta Sugawara; Satomi Ishihara; Tadanobu Asano; Mitsuru Hirata; Yoshiko Miyazaki
- Cinematography: Tatsuhiko Kobayashi
- Edited by: Aoyama Masafumi
- Music by: Alpha
- Production companies: SIGLO Ltd.; TV Asahi; Horipro
- Distributed by: Toei Company
- Release date: April 5, 2003 (Japan)
- Running time: 113 minutes
- Country: Japan
- Language: Japanese
- Box office: ¥50 million

My Grandpa (Japanese: わたしのグランパ, Hepburn: Watashi no Guranpa) is a 2003 Japanese coming of age drama film directed by Yōichi Higashi. It was adapted by Higashi from a novel of the same name by Yasutaka Tsutsui. The film depicts the relationship between a young woman and her grandfather, who has recently returned from prison. It stars Bunta Sugawara in the lead role, in addition to Satomi Ishihara, Tadanobu Asano, Mitsuru Hirata and Yoshiko Miyazaki. Alpha composed the film's score. My Grandpa was theatrically released by Toei Company on April 5, 2003, in Japan. Ishihara won several awards for her performance in the film.

== Plot ==
Tamako, a 14 year old junior high school student, is the only daughter of the Godai family. Her parents' marriage is faltering, she is being bullied at school, and her grandfather, Kenzo, went to jail 13 years ago for killing a yakuza gangster. She anxiously awaits the day her grandfather can return home. When Kenzo is released, he goes to live with his son. Despite 13 years having passed, the locals warmly welcome Kenzo. He takes to hanging out at a bar run by Shinichi, the son of his best friend who died a long time ago.

However, when Tamako's peers discover that her grandfather went to jail for murder, she is further ostracized. Despite their initially awkward interactions, Kenzo helps defend Tamako from the bullies at school. He tells her to stand up for herself, and when she does, Tamako comes to believe that she has inherited some of her grandfather's great strength.

Kenzo and Tamako grow close, and Tamako's parents repair their relationship. At one point, Kenzo sends his son and daughter-in-law off on a "second honeymoon", and then takes Tamako to Tokyo for a night on the town.

However, their peace is short-lived. One day, a yakuza waits for Kenzo in front of the house. He is an associate of the man Kenzo killed, who has come looking for revenge. It is revealed that Kenzo killed the man to avenge the death of his best friend, who was murdered by members of the local yakuza gang. Hikita, the boss of the gang, has been waiting patiently for Kenzo's return, and orders his gang to kidnap Tamako. He threatens Kenzo, but Kenzo is able to rescue his granddaughter and resolve the situation. In spite of their feud, the two men clean the slate between them.

Things return to normal. Time passes. One day, Kenzo tries to help a young girl drowning in a river. He saves the girl but ends up drowning himself. At the funeral, Tamako swears to never forget her grandpa.

== Cast ==
- Bunta Sugawara as Kenzo Godai
- Satomi Ishihara as Tamako Godai
- Tadanobu Asano as Shinichi Nakato
- Mitsuru Hirata as Keiichi Godai
- Yoshiko Miyazaki as Chieko Godai
- Masatō Ibu as Ryuzo Hikita
- Tomomi Miyauchi
- Kuriko Namino as Misao Godai
- Taro Fujioka

== Background ==
Tsutsui's novel was first published by Bungeishunjū in August 1999. It was his first coming of age novel since The Girl Who Leapt Through Time. Watashi no Guranpa would go on to win the 51st Yomiuri Prize for Literature. Upon meeting director Higashi, Tsutsui made no requests of him regarding the adaptation.

== Production ==
Higashi had seen Bunta Sugawara give a televised interview in the early 1990s, in which Sugawara stated that "The main [film] audience [are] in their teens and twenties, and film companies are biased toward making films specifically for young people, so older actors aren't needed [anymore]." His words struck a chord with the director, who was only a year younger than Sugawara. He endeavored to make a film with the actor at some point. Years later, Higashi came across Tsutsui's novel in a bookstore. Though he had preconceived notions of the book being for children, he bought it, and was surprised by its depiction of the relationship between a young girl and her grandfather. Upon finishing the novel, he asked a producer to purchase the film rights. Higashi believed that Sugawara was the only person who could play Kenzo, though he had heard that Sugawara's eldest son died in 2001, and Sugawara had subsequently lost interest in returning to the film industry. Director Higashi wrote a letter to Sugawara, asking if he would be willing to star in the film. Higashi included a copy of the rough draft of the script, the original novel and his impressions of Sugawara's early 1990s TV interview. A few days later, Sugawara agreed to play the role.

Akira Kobayashi later stated that he was approached as a potential back-up casting for Kenzo; however, he turned the role down, believing he wasn't right for the part.

Author Tsutsui was affiliated with Horipro; once the film adaptation was greenlit, Horipro decided to hold a public audition for the role of Tamako.

Filming took place primarily on location in Ashikaga, Tochigi Prefecture, as well as Fujioka and the Watarase River.

== Release ==
My Grandpa was theatrically released by Toei Company on April 5, 2003, in Japan. It was released in 49 theaters for 3 weeks, grossing ¥50 million at the box office. The film was later released to DVD on September 21, 2003, by Toei Video.

When Sugawara passed away on November 28, 2014, My Grandpa was broadcast in his memory on TV Asahi. However, 30 minutes of footage were cut from the TV broadcast version, prompting harsh criticism from director Higashi.

== Reception ==
Writing for Variety, Derek Elley said that, "far from the squishy kind of Japanese family pic hinted at by its moniker, the movie is a multi-layered, likable group portrait centered on a teen’s friendship with an ex-con grandfather she previously never knew." He believed that "Sugawara’s playing of Kenzo is the picture’s major delight", though he reserved some criticism for the film's "didactic" script and a late plot development that "isn’t sufficiently backgrounded to work." Nonetheless, he wrote that the film was cast well, and the runtime was "just right."

== Awards and nominations ==
28th Hochi Film Awards

- Won: Best New Artist (Satomi Ishihara)

27th Montreal World Film Festival

- Won: Golden Zenith for Best Asian Film (Yōichi Higashi)

16th Nikkan Sports Film Awards

- Won: Best Supporting Actor (Bunta Sugawara)
- Won: Yūjirō Ishihara Newcomer Award (Satomi Ishihara)

25th Yokohama Film Festival

- Won: Best New Talent (Satomi Ishihara, shared with Masami Nagasawa and Hiroyuki Miyasako)

46th Blue Ribbon Awards

- Won: Best Newcomer (Satomi Ishihara)

13th Japanese Movie Critics Awards

- Won: Newcomer Award (Satomi Ishihara)

27th Japan Academy Awards

- Won: Newcomer of the Year (Satomi Ishihara, shared with Hayato Ichihara, Joe Odagiri, Naohito Fujiki and Masami Nagasawa)
