= Kenichi Matsuyama =

Japanese actor (born 1985)

- 松山 ケンイチ
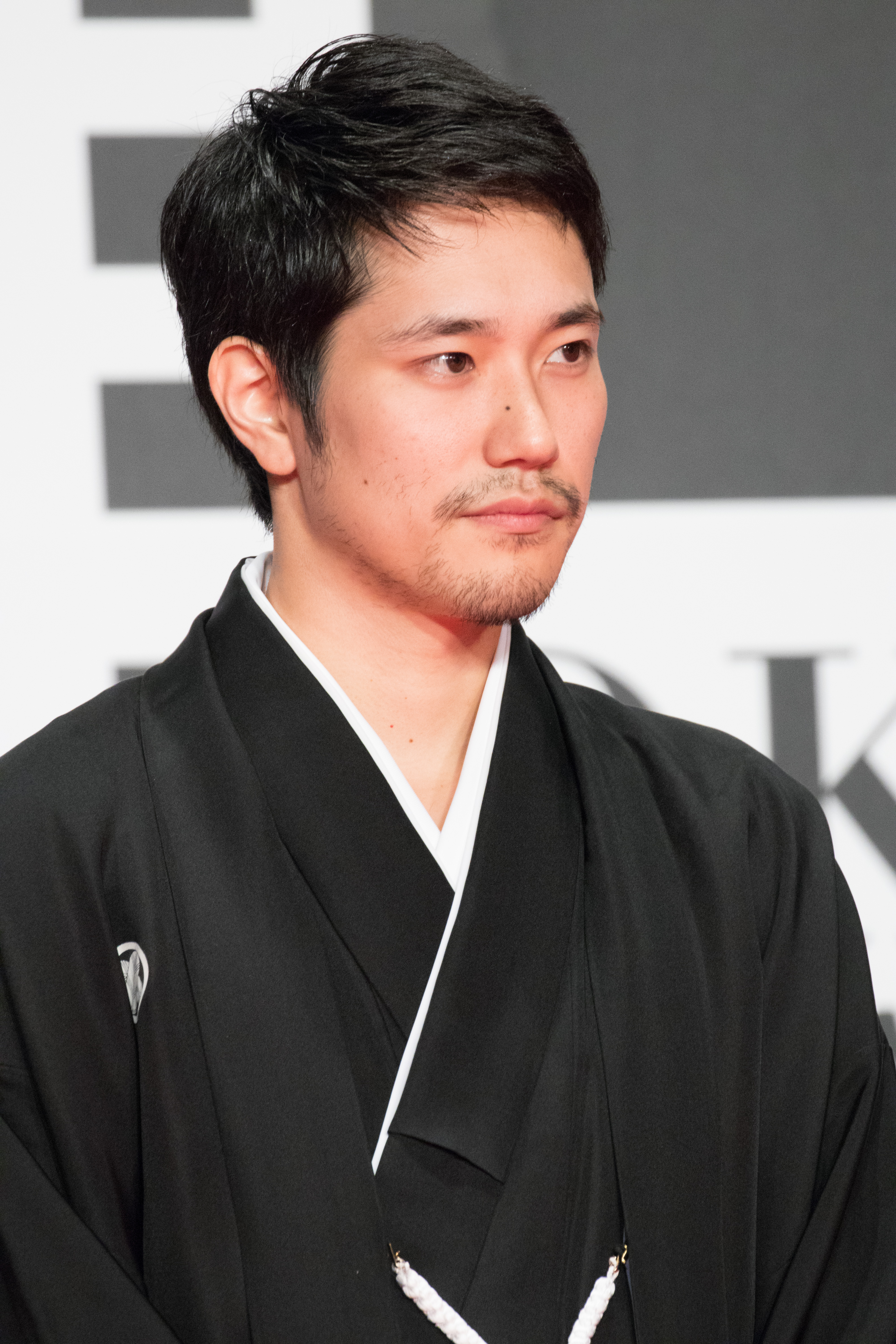
- Matsuyama at the 2016 Tokyo International Film Festival
- Born: Kenichi Matsuyama (松山 研一); March 5, 1985 (age 41); Mutsu, Aomori, Japan
- Occupation: Actor
- Years active: 2001–present
- Agent: Horipro
- Spouse: Koyuki (m. 2011)
- Children: 3

Kenichi Matsuyama (松山 ケンイチ, Matsuyama Ken'ichi; born March 5, 1985) is a Japanese actor. He is known for his affinity for strange character roles, and he is best known internationally for playing L in the 2006 films Death Note, Death Note 2: The Last Name, and L: Change the World in 2008. He played the main character Toru Watanabe in the film adaptation of Haruki Murakami's novel Norwegian Wood.

His stage name uses the katakana spelling of his first name (ケンイチ) instead of the usual kanji (研一).

== Early career ==
In 2000 he entered Aomori Prefectural Ominato High School. While there, he debuted as a model, in 2001, for PARCO, after winning the Grand Prix "New Style Audition", an event in collaboration with the agency Horipro. from among 16,572 applicants. He graduated from Tokyo Metropolitan Toyama High School.

Matsuyama made his acting debut in the television series Gokusen in 2002.

He made his first film appearance in Bright Future in 2003.

He starred in the film Winning Pass in 2004, a movie with its main character modeled after real–life wheelchair basketball player Kohei Kamimura.

Matsuyama starred in Ultra Miracle Love Story in 2009, using the Tsugaru dialect of Japanese in the film.

He played a police detective in the 2023 drama Why Didn't I Tell You a Million Times?

He voiced the role of Balthazar Bratt in the Japanese dub of Despicable Me 3 in 2017.

He was in the stage play Seven Souls in the Skull Castle in 2017.

== Personal life ==
On April 1, 2011, he married Koyuki Katō, who co-starred with him in Kamui Gaiden. The couple's first child was born in January 2012, and their second child was born in January 2013 in South Korea. In July 2015, the couple had their third child.

He speaks in the Shimokita dialect. He also presumably speaks English, judging from a scene in L: Change The World where he plays L, who is talking to Near in English.

== Filmography ==
=== Film ===
Year	Title	Role	Notes	Ref.
2003	Bright Future	Jun		
2003	Worst by Chance	Korean high school student		
2004	Winning Pass	Kenta Kobayashi	Lead role	
2004	The Locker 2	Yosuke Shinohara		
2004	Kamachi			
2004	The Taste of Tea	Matsuken		
2005	Linda Linda Linda	Makihara		
2005	Nana	Shinichi "Shin" Okazaki		
2005	Furyo Shonen no Yume	Hiroyuki Yoshiie	Lead role	
2005	Custom Made 10.30	Tamotsu/Shin-Getsu		
2005	Otoko-tachi no Yamato	Katsumi Kamio (15 years old)		
2006	Oyayubi Sagashi	Tomohiko Igarashi		
2006	Death Note	L		
2006	Death Note 2: The Last Name	L		
2007	Ten Nights of Dreams	Shōtarō	Anthology film	
2007	Genghis Khan: To the Ends of the Earth and Sea	Juchi		
2007	Shindo	Wao		
2007	Southbound	Officer Niigaki		
2007	Tsubaki Sanjuro	Iori Isaka		
2007	Dolphin Blue: Fuji, mo Ichido Sora e	Kazuya Uemura	Lead role	
2008	L: Change the World	L	Lead role	
2008	Sex Is No Laughing Matter	Mirume	Lead role	
2008	Detroit Metal City	Souichi Negishi/Johannes Krauser II	Lead role	
2009	Kamui Gaiden	Kamui	Lead role	
2009	Kaiji	Makoto Sahara		
2009	Ultra Miracle Love Story	Yojin	Lead role	
2010	Norwegian Wood	Toru Watanabe	Lead role	
2010	Memoirs of a Teenage Amnesiac	Yuji Miwa	Lead role	
2011	Gantz	Masaru Kato	Lead role	
2011	Gantz: Perfect Answer	Masaru Kato	Lead role	
2011	My Back Page	Umeyama	Lead role	
2011	Usagi Drop	Daikichi Kawachi	Lead role	
2012	Train Brain Express	Kei Komachi	Lead role	
2013	The Kiyosu Conference	Hidemasa Hori		
2014	Homeland	Jirō Sawada	Lead role	
2014	Climbing to Spring	Tōru Nagamine	Lead role	
2015	Chasuke's Journey	Chasuke	Lead role	
2015	The Emperor in August	Takeo Sasaki	Special appearance	
2016	Rage	Tetsuya Tashiro		
2016	Satoshi: A Move for Tomorrow	Satoshi Murayama	Lead role	
2016	Chin-yu-ki: The Journey to the West with Farts	Tarō Yamada	Lead role	
2016	Something Like, Something Like It	Defunetei Shinden	Lead role	
2016	Death Note: Light Up the New World	L	Cameo	
2017	Sekigahara	Naoe Kanetsugu		
2017	Yurigokoro	Yōsuke		
2017	Despicable Me 3	Balthazar Bratt	Voice; Japanese dub	
2019	Miyamoto	Kazuo Jinbo		
2019	Promare	Galo Thymos	Voice; Lead role	
2020	Mio's Cookbook			
2020	Hotel Royal	Miyagawa		
2021	Brave: Gunjō Senki	Oda Nobunaga		
2021	Blue	Urita	Lead role	
2022	Noise	Jun Tanabe	Lead role	
2022	Dreaming of the Meridian Arc	Kinoshita / Matakichi		
2022	Riverside Mukolitta	Yamada	Lead role	
2023	Do Unto Others	Munenori Shiba	Lead role	
2023	We're Broke, My Lord!	Matsudaira Shinjirō		
2024	Saint Young Men: The Movie	Jesus	Lead role	
2025	Hey, Dazai: The Movie	Osamu Dazai		
2025	Seaside Serendipity		Voice	
2025	New Interpretation of the End of Edo Period	Hijikata Toshizō		
2026	Nagi Notes	Yoshihiro Iguchi		
2026	Hara o Kukutte			

=== Japanese dub ===
Year	Title	Role	Notes	Ref.
2025	Elio	Lord Grigon		

=== Television ===
Year	Title	Role	Notes	Ref.
2002	Gokusen	Kenichi Mouri		
2003	Kids War 5	Yūta Kuroda		
2005	1 Litre of Tears	Yuji Kawamoto		
2006	Tsubasa no Oreta Tenshitachi	Tarō / Shingo		
2006	Sono 5 fun mae	Yuka Takashi	Lead role	
2006	Death Note	Gelus	Voice; Episode: "Koigokoro"	
2007	Sexy Voice and Robo	Iichiro Sudo/Robo	Lead role	
2008	Matsuda Spinoff	L		
2008	Detroit Metal City	Makoto Hokazono	Voice; Cameo	
2009	Zeni Geba	Gamagori Futaro	Lead role	
2010	Japanese Americans	Hiramatsu Jiro		
2012	Taira no Kiyomori	Taira no Kiyomori	Lead role; Taiga drama	
2015	Dokonjo Gaeru	Hiroshi	Lead role	
2015	Futagashira	Benzō	Lead role	
2016	Death Note: New Generation	L	Cameo	
2017	A Life	Sōta Igawa		
2018	Residential Complex	Daiki Igarashi		
2018	Miyamoto kara Kimi e	Kazuo Jinbo		
2019	Shiroi Kyotō	Shuji Satomi	Miniseries	
2019	Yuganda Hamon	Mitazono		
2020	Komoribito	Masao	Lead role; Television film	
2021	Japan Sinks: People of Hope	Koichi Tokiwa		
2023	What Will You Do, Ieyasu?	Honda Masanobu	Taiga drama	
2023	Why Didn't I Tell You a Million Times?	Yuzuru Uozumi		
2024	The Tiger and Her Wings	Tōichirō Katsuraba	Asadora	
2025	Who Saw the Peacock Dance in the Jungle?	Yoshiteru Matsukaze		
2025	Hey, Dazai	Osamu Dazai	Television film	
2026	Did Someone Happen to Mention Me?	Kawashima		
2026	Until the T-shirt Dries	Mitsuru		

== Awards and nominations ==
Year	Award	Category	Nominated work(s)	Result	Ref.
2006	31st Hochi Film Awards	Best New Actor	Death Note	Won	
2007	28th Yokohama Film Festival	Best New Talent	Death Note	Won	
2007	30th Japan Academy Film Prize	Best Supporting Actor	Death Note	Nominated	
2007	30th Japan Academy Film Prize	Newcomer of the Year	Death Note	Won	
2007	31st Elan d'or Awards	Newcomer of the Year	Himself	Won	
2008	2nd Asia Pacific Producer's Network Award	Best Actor	Death Note	Won	
2009	32nd Japan Academy Film Prize	Best Actor	Detroit Metal City	Nominated	
2009	32nd Japan Academy Film Prize	Most Popular Actor	Detroit Metal City	Won	
2010	64th Mainichi Film Awards	Best Actor	Ultra Miracle Love story	Won	
2010	24th Takasaki Film Festival	Best Actor	Ultra Miracle Love story	Won	
2011	24th Nikkan Sports Film Awards	Best Actor	My Back Page, Norwegian Wood, Gantz, Usagi Drop	Won	
2017	71st Mainichi Film Awards	Best Actor	Satoshi: A Move for Tomorrow	Nominated	
2017	12th Osaka Cinema Festival	Best Actor	Satoshi: A Move for Tomorrow	Won	
2017	40th Japan Academy Film Prize	Best Actor	Satoshi: A Move for Tomorrow	Nominated	
2017	59th Blue Ribbon Awards	Best Actor	Satoshi: A Move for Tomorrow, Chinyūki	Won	
2022	76th Mainichi Film Awards	Best Actor	Blue	Nominated	
2022	35th Nikkan Sports Film Awards	Best Actor	Riverside Mukolitta and Noise	Nominated	
2023	36th Nikkan Sports Film Awards	Best Actor	Do Unto Others	Nominated	
2024	66th Blue Ribbon Awards	Best Actor	Do Unto Others	Nominated	
