= Chihiro Kondo =

Japanese fashion model

- 近藤 千尋
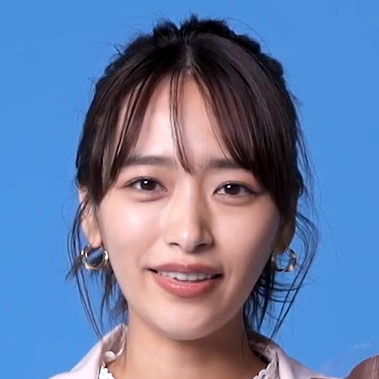
- Kondo in 2020
- Born: 15 December 1989 (age 36); Okayama Prefecture
- Other name: Chipi (ちぴ)
- Education: Sugiyama Jogakuen University
- Occupation: Model
- Style: Fashion
- Height: 160 cm (5 ft 3 in)
- Spouse: Hirohisa Ota (m. 2015)

Chihiro Kondo (近藤 千尋, Kondō Chihiro; born 15 December 1989) is a Japanese fashion model and actress. She is represented with Asia Promotion.

== Biography ==
In March 1996, Kondo graduated from Kazo City Hanazaki Kita Kindergarten. Later in April, she entered Kasumi City Hanasaki Kita Elementary School.

Kondo graduated from Sugiyama Jogakuen University.

She became popular after becoming an exclusive model for S Cawaii!, and later appeared in a cover for the first time. Kondo also served as a cover girl, in which those covers topped about 600,000 copies.

Currently, she is also active in variety shows.

Kondo married on 5 September 2015. She married Hirohisa Ota of the comedy trio Jungle Pocket.

== Filmography ==
=== Magazines ===
Year	Title
2011	PopSister
2012	S Cawaii!
	Tokyo Spy Girl
Katy
Nail Up!

=== TV programmes ===
Year	Title	Network
	Me-Tele do matsuri Live 2012	NBN
2013	Utsushi nēru "Suppin"	NHK BS Premium
2014	Channel Nama Kaiten TV All Zap!	BS Sk-Per!
2023	Why Didn't I Tell You a Million Times?	TBS

=== Events ===
Year	Title
2012	Nihon Kawaī-haku In Niigata
2012	Shibuya 109 Fastival
	Tokyo Girls Collection in Nagoya '11 S/S-'12 A/W
2013	Kansai Collection '13 S/S
2013	Girls Award '13 S/S
2013	Tokyo Girls Collection Spring Collection Miyazaki Koi Tabi
2013	a-nation & GirlsAward island collection by S Cawaii
2013	Girl's Blogger Style '13 A/W

=== Films ===
Year	Title
2012	Kishibe-chou Kidan: Tanbou-hen

=== Music videos ===
Year	Title	Ref.
2016	Sonar Pocket "Ai o komete Okuru Uta"	

== Bibliography ==
Year	Title	Ref.
2016	Chipi Hon	
