= Jungle Pocket (comedy duo) =

Japanese comedy trio

- Janguru Poketto (ジャングルポケット)
- Employer: Yoshimoto Kōgyō

Comedy career
- Years active: 2006–
- Genres: Conte, manzai
- Members: Hirohisa Ōta (Boke); Otake (Ponkotsu)

Notes
- Same year/generation as: Naomi Watanabe; Saraba Seishun no Hikari

Jungle Pocket (ジャングルポケット, Janguru Poketto) is a Japanese comedy duo consisting of Hirohisa Ōta (太田博久) and Otake (おたけ). Formerly a trio, Shinji Saitō (斉藤慎二) was removed from the group in October 2024 after being charged with sexual assault. They are graduates of the Yoshimoto NSC Tokyo 12th generation and employed by Yoshimoto Kogyo. They are mostly active in Tokyo.

== Members ==
=== Current ===
- Hirohisa Ōta (太田博久) Born December 10, 1983 in Toyota, Aichi. Plays the boke. He is the main writer of the group's material and skits. His wife is the fashion model, Chihiro Kondo.
- Otake (おたけ), real name Kozo Takeyama (武山浩三), Born December 2, 1982 in Chūō, Tokyo. Plays the ponkotsu role, a persona that has become synonymous with Otake's character. He is currently a member of the comedy-focused idol group, Yoshimotozaka46.

=== Former ===
- Shinji Saitō (斉藤慎二) Born October 26, 1982 in Yachiyo, Chiba. Played the boke, but had transitioned to also playing the tsukkomi. He aspired to be an actor before becoming a comedian and graduated with a degree in acting from Toho Gakuen College of Drama and Music before joining Yoshimoto NSC.

== Career ==
The unit formed at a banquet party right before the 12th generation graduation when Ōta and Otake decided to partner up, with Saitō joining afterwards to form the trio. At first, Ōta was not thrilled to team up with Saitō. The name Jungle Pocket is named after the famous racehorse Jungle Pocket by Saitō who was a fan of the horse. Saito has gone on to own one of Jungle Pocket's last crops, a filly that he named Omataseshimashita, as well as making cameo appearances in the anime adaptation of Umamusume, which feature an anthropomorphized version of the horse.

Jungle Pocket made several appearances on King of Conte for their conte and M-1 Grand Prix and The Manzai for their manzai. They reached the semi-finals for King of Conte 6 years in a row until 2015, when they made it to the finals for the first time. Since then, the group gained popularity and make frequent appearances on television.

Yoshimoto Kogyo announced on October 7, 2024, that Saito would be dismissed from his job, after being found out that he was arrested for having committed sexual assault in July against a 20-year old woman in a bus at a filming location in Tokyo. Saito himself confirmed the action. The remaining members will continue as a duo. Saito later made news for starting a business selling Baumkuchen which was criticized for being another store's products resold at a higher price.

== Achievements ==
=== King of Conte ===
- 2008 - 2nd Round
- 2009 - Semi-Finalist
- 2010 - Semi-Finalist
- 2011 - Semi-Finalist
- 2012 - Semi-Finalist
- 2013 - Semi-Finalist
- 2014 - Semi-Finalist
- 2015 - Finalist (4th Place)
- 2016 - Finalist (Runners-up)
- 2017 - Finalist (4th Place)
- 2018 - Semi-Finalist

=== M-1 Grand Prix ===
- 2007 - 2nd Round
- 2008 - 3rd Round
- 2009 - Semi-Finalist
- 2010 - Quarter-Finalist
- 2015 - Quarter-Finalist

=== The Manzai ===
- 2011 - 2nd Round
- 2012 - Certified Manzai Comedian
- 2013 - 2nd Round
- 2014 - Certified Manzai Comedian
