= Satoshi Tsumabuki =

Japanese actor (born 1980)

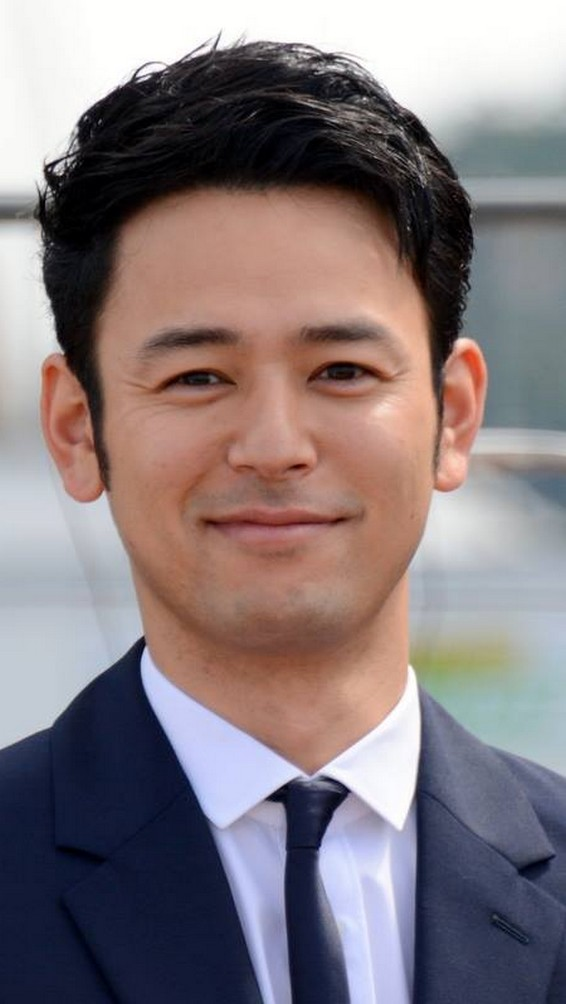
- Tsumabuki at the 2015 Cannes Film Festival
- Born: December 13, 1980 (age 45); Yanagawa, Fukuoka, Japan
- Occupations: Actor; singer; bassist
- Years active: 1998–present
- Known for: Waterboys
- Spouse: Maiko (m. 2016)
- Children: 2

Japanese name
- Kanji: 妻夫木聡
- Hiragana: つまぶきさとし
Transcriptions
- Romanization: Tsumabuki Satoshi

Satoshi Tsumabuki (妻夫木聡, Tsumabuki Satoshi; born December 13, 1980) is a Japanese actor. His breakthrough film was Waterboys for which he was nominated for the "Best Actor" award at the Japanese Academy Awards, and won the "Newcomer of the Year" prize. He is also the bassist and lead singer of the Japanese band Basking Lite.

== Filmography ==
=== Film ===
Year	Film	Role	Notes	Ref.
1998	Nazo no Tenkousei	Koichi Iwata		
1999	Great Teacher Onizuka	Ichirōta		
2001	Tomie: Re-birth	Takumi Aoyama		
2001	Waterboys	Suzuki	Lead role	
2002	Sabu	Sabu	Lead role	
2002	Jam Films	Tōjō	Lead role; "Justice" segment	
2003	Sayonara Kuro	Ryosuke Kimura	Lead role	
2003	Dragon Head	Teru Aoki	Lead role	
2003	Josee, the Tiger and the Fish	Tsuneo	Lead role	
2004	A Day on the Planet	Nakazawa	Lead role	
2004	69 sixty nine	Kenichi Yazaki	Lead role	
2004	Thirty Lies or So	Sasaki		
2005	Lorelei: The Witch of the Pacific Ocean	Yukito Origasa	Lead role	
2005	Yaji and Kita: The Midnight Pilgrims	The Phantom Yaijrobei		
2005	Spring Snow	Kiyoaki Matsugae	Lead role	
2005	It's Only Talk	Noboru		
2005	Tetsujin 28: The Movie	Windchime Seller		
2006	The Fast and the Furious: Tokyo Drift	Exceedingly Handsome Guy	Cameo; American film	
2006	Tears for you	Yotaro Aragaki	Lead role	
2007	Dororo	Hyakkimaru	Lead role	
2007	Kayōkyoku dayo jinsei wa	Takashi Suzuki	Lead role, episode 9	
2007	Welcome to the Quiet Room	Komono		
2008	Tokyo!	Takeshi	"Interior Design" segment	
2008	The Magic Hour	Bingo		
2008	Children of the Dark	Hiroaki Yoda		
2008	Paco and the Magical Book	Muromachi		
2008	School Days with a Pig	Mr. Hoshi	Lead role	
2009	Pandemic	Tsuyoshi Matsuoka	Lead role	
2009	Boat	Toru	Lead role; South Korean-Japanese film	
2009	Villon's Wife	Okada		
2010	Surely Someday	Policeman		
2010	Villain	Shimizu	Lead role	
2011	My Back Page	Masami Sawada	Lead role	
2011	Smuggler	Ryōsuke Kinuta	Lead role	
2012	Fly with the Gold	Hiroyuki Kōda	Lead role	
2012	For Love's Sake	Makoto Taiga	Lead role	
2013	Tokyo Family	Masatsugu Hirayama		
2013	The Kiyosu Conference	Oda Nobukatsu		
2014	Judge!	Kiichirō Ōta	Lead role	
2014	Our Family	Kōsuke Wakana	Lead role	
2014	The World of Kanako	Asai		
2014	The Little House	Arai		
2014	Stand by Me Doraemon	Adult Nobita (voice)		
2014	The Vancouver Asahi	Reggie Kasahara	Lead role	
2014	Lady Maiko	Yuichiro Akagi		
2015	The Assassin	The mirror polisher	Chinese film	
2016	What a Wonderful Family!	Shōta Hirata		
2016	The Magnificent Nine	Jin'nai Asanoya		
2016	Rage	Yūma Fujita		
2016	Museum	Sanae Kirishima		
2017	Traces of Sin	Tanaka	Lead role	
2017	Tornado Girl	Yūji Kōroki	Lead role	
2017	What a Wonderful Family! 2	Shōta Hirata		
2018	What a Wonderful Family! 3: My Wife, My Life	Shōta Hirata		
2018	Detective Chinatown 2	Noda	Chinese film	
2018	The Miracle of Crybaby Shottan	Fuyuno		
2018	It Comes	Hideki Tahara		
2019	Paradise Next	Makino	Lead role; Taiwanese-Japanese film	
2019	The 47 Ronin in Debt	Sugaya Han'nojō		
2020	Not Quite Dead Yet	The manager of the Crown Hotel		
2020	Shape of Red	Kurata		
2020	I Never Shot Anyone	Tomoya Imanishi		
2020	Stand by Me Doraemon 2	Adult Nobita (voice)		
2020	The Asadas	Yukihiro Asada		
2021	Detective Chinatown 3	Hiroshi Noda	Chinese film	
2022	A Man	Akira Kido	Lead role	
2024	The Real You	Masato Nozaki		
2025	Hero's Island	Gusuku	Lead role	
2026	One Last Love Letter	Ryoichi Terada		

=== TV dramas ===
Year	Title	Rol	Notes	Ref.
1998	Subarashii Hibi			
1998	Over Time		Episode 2	
1999	Omizu no hanamichi	Nakata		
1999	Koi no Kiseki	Taeko's manager		
2000	Ikebukuro West Gate Park	Fujio Saitō		
2000	Limit: Moshimo wagako ga	Atsushi Shioya		
2001	Kabachitare	Kazuya Machida	Episodes 5, 10 and 11	
2001	Heaven Cannot Wait 2: The Teacher	Tadashi Okinoshima		
2001	Shotgun Wedding	Takumi Shinjō		
2001	Platonic Sex	Takashi Tsujimoto		
2001	Chūshingura 1/47	Gunbei Takata	Television film	
2002	The Long Love Letter	Ryūta Fujisawa		
2002	Kisarazu Cat's Eye	Little Yamada	Episode 9	
2002	Wedding Planner	Shuhei Narumi		
2002	Tokyo Muke Michi Girl	Akira		
2002	The Queen of Lunchtime Cuisine	Junzaburō Nabeshima		
2003	Say Hello to Black Jack	Dr. Eijirō Saitō	Lead role	
2003	Ikebukuro West Gate Park Special	Fujio Saitō		
2004	Say Hello to Black Jack Special	Dr. Eijirō Saitō	Lead role	
2004	Toride Naki Mono	Kiichirō Yahiro	Television film	
2004	Orange Days	Kai Yūki	Lead role	
2005	Slow Dance	Riichi Serizawa	Lead role	
2007	High and Low	Ginjiro Takeuchi	Television film	
2009	Tenchijin	Naoe Kanetsugu	Lead role; Taiga drama	
2014	All About My Siblings	Asahi Satō	Lead role	
2016	Kidnap Tour	Takashi	Lead role; Television film	
2018	Innocent Days	Shin'ichi Sasaki	Lead role; also producer	
2018	When a Tree Falls	Satoshi Kayama	Lead role; Television film	
2020	The Dangerous Venus	Hakurō Teshima	Lead role	
2021	Shikatanakatta to Iute wa Ikan no desu	Taichi Torii	Lead role; Television film	
2023	Get Ready!	Eisuke Hazama/Shinichi Amano	Lead role	
2024	All Lives	Riku Sakura	Lead role; Television film	
2025	Anpan	Shinnosuke Yagi	Asadora	
2025	Passing the Reins	Eiji Kurisu	Lead role	

=== Puppetry ===
- Sherlock Holmes (2014) as Jefferson Hope (voice)

=== Japanese dub ===
Year	Title	Role	Voice dub for	Notes	Ref.
2001	Titanic	Jack Dawson	Leonardo DiCaprio	2001 Fuji TV version	

== Personal life ==
Tsumabuki announced through his agency that he has married actress Maiko on August 4, 2016. The two have been in a relationship for over four years, and they met back in 2012 when they co-starred in the Fuji TV drama Keigo Higashino Mysteries.

Tsumabuki and his wife welcomed the birth of their first child on December 11, 2019, and their second child on September 13, 2022.

== Awards and nominations ==
Year	Award	Category	Work(s)	Result	Ref.
2002	26th Elan d'or Awards	Newcomer Award	Himself	Won	
2002	25th Japan Academy Film Prize	Newcomer of the Year	Waterboys	Won	
2002	25th Japan Academy Film Prize	Best Actor	Waterboys	Nominated	
2002	39th Golden Arrow Awards	Newcomer Award	Waterboys	Won	
2002	11th Japanese Professional Movie Awards	Special Award	Waterboys	Won	
2002	34th Television Academy Awards	Best Supporting Actor	Lunch no Joou	Won	
2003	37th Television Academy Awards	Best Actor	Say Hello to Black Jack	Won	
2004	18th Takasaki Film Festival	Best Actor	Josee, the Tiger and the Fish	Won	
2004	2nd Vladivostok Film Festival	Best Actor	Josee, the Tiger and the Fish	Won	
2004	77th Kinema Junpo Awards	Best Actor	Josee, the Tiger and the Fish, Sayonara Kuro and Dragonhead	Won	
2004	29th Hochi Film Awards	Best Actor	Josee, the Tiger and the Fish, 69 sixty nine and A Day on the Planet	Won	
2004	46th Blue Ribbon Awards	Best Actor	Josee, the Tiger and the Fish, Sayonara Kuro and Dragonhead	Nominated	
2004	25th Yokohama Film Festival	Best Actor	Sayonara Kuro and Dragonhead	Won	
2004	12th Hashida Awards	Newcomer Award	Say Hello to Black Jack	Won	
2004	41st Television Academy Awards	Best Actor	Orange Days	Won	
2005	47th Blue Ribbon Awards	Best Actor	69 sixty nine and A Day on the Planet	Nominated	
2006	29th Japan Academy Film Prize	Best Actor	Spring Snow	Nominated	
2007	30th Japan Academy Film Prize	Best Actor	Nada Sōsō	Nominated	
2010	23rd Nikkan Sports Film Awards	Best Actor	Villain	Won	
2011	53rd Blue Ribbon Awards	Best Actor	Villain	Won	
2011	34th Japan Academy Film Prize	Best Actor	Villain	Won	
2014	37th Japan Academy Film Prize	Best Supporting Actor	Tokyo Family	Nominated	
2016	29th Tokyo International Film Festival	Arigato Award	Himself	Won	
2016	29th Nikkan Sports Film Awards	Best Supporting Actor	Rage and Museum	Won	
2017	71st Mainichi Film Awards	Best Supporting Actor	Rage	Nominated	
2017	40th Japan Academy Film Prize	Best Supporting Actor	Rage	Won	
2018	60th Blue Ribbon Awards	Best Actor	Tornado Girl	Nominated	
2020	33rd Nikkan Sports Film Awards	Best Supporting Actor	The Asadas	Won	
2021	63rd Blue Ribbon Awards	Best Supporting Actor	The Asadas	Nominated	
2021	44th Japan Academy Film Prize	Best Supporting Actor	The Asadas	Nominated	
2022	47th Hochi Film Awards	Best Actor	A Man	Nominated	
2023	77th Mainichi Film Awards	Best Actor	A Man	Nominated	
2023	65th Blue Ribbon Awards	Best Actor	A Man	Nominated	
2023	46th Japan Academy Film Prize	Best Actor	A Man	Won	
2025	38th Nikkan Sports Film Awards	Best Actor	Hero's Island	Nominated	
2026	80th Mainichi Film Awards	Best Lead Performance	Hero's Island	Nominated	
2026	68th Blue Ribbon Awards	Best Actor	Hero's Island	Won	
2026	49th Japan Academy Film Prize	Best Actor	Hero's Island	Nominated	
