= 25th Yokohama Film Festival =

2004 film festival in Yokohama, Japan

- Location: Kannai Hall, Yokohama, Kanagawa, Japan
- Founded: 1980
- Festival date: 1 February 2004

The 25th Yokohama Film Festival (第25回ヨコハマ映画祭) was held on 1 February 2004 in Kannai Hall, Yokohama, Kanagawa, Japan.

== Awards ==
- Best Film: Vibrator
- Best Actor: Satoshi Tsumabuki – Sayonara, Kuro, Dragon Head
- Best Actress: Shinobu Terajima – Vibrator, Akame 48 Waterfalls
- Best Supporting Actor: Nao Ōmori – Vibrator, Akame 48 Waterfalls
- Best Supporting Actress: Kimiko Yo – Sayonara, Kuro, Hotel Hibiscus, Worst by Chance
- Best Director: Ryūichi Hiroki – Vibrator
- Best New Director: Miwa Nishikawa – Wild Berries
- Best Screenplay: Haruhiko Arai – Vibrator
- Best Cinematography: Norimichi Kasamatsu – Sayonara, Kuro, Akame 48 Waterfalls, My House
- Best Art Direction: Takeo Kimura – Jōhatsu Tabinikki
- Best New Talent:
  - Masami Nagasawa – Like Asura, Robokon
  - Hiroyuki Miyasako – Wild Berries, 13 Kaidan
  - Satomi Ishihara – Watashi no Guranpa
- Special Prize: Hideo Onchi – Warabi no kō – For this film and for his career.

== Best 10 ==
1. Vibrator
2. Doing Time
3. Zatōichi
4. Akame 48 Waterfalls
5. A Snake of June
6. My House
7. Like Asura
8. Sayonara, Kuro
9. Robokon
10. Wild Berries

runner-up: Hotel Hibiscus
