= Nada Sōsō (film) =

- Japanese DVD cover of Nada Sōsō
- Directed by: Nobuhiro Doi
- Screenplay by: Noriko Yoshida
- Based on: Nada Sōsō by Begin and Ryoko Moriyama
- Produced by: Kazuya Hamana; Junichi Shindo
- Starring: Masami Nagasawa; Satoshi Tsumabuki; Kumiko Aso
- Cinematography: Takeshi Hamada
- Edited by: Junnosuke Hogaki
- Music by: Akira Senju
- Production company: TBS
- Distributed by: Toho
- Release date: October 27, 2006 (Japan)
- Running time: 118 minutes
- Country: Japan
- Language: Japanese
- Box office: $25,300,338

Nada Sōsō (Japanese: 涙そうそう; lit. Tears for You) is a 2006 Japanese romance film directed by Nobuhiro Doi. Starring Masami Nagasawa, Satoshi Tsumabuki, Kumiko Aso as Kaoru Aragaki, Yotaro Aragaki and Keiko Inamine, the film depicts Okinawan step-siblings, Kaoru and Yotaru, growing up.

== Cast ==
- Satoshi Tsumabuki - Yotaro Aragaki
- Masami Nagasawa - Kaoru Aragaki
- Kumiko Aso - Keiko Inamine
- Takashi Tsukamoto - Yuichi Shimabukuro
- Tomi Taira - Mito Niigaki (grandmother)
- Eiichiro Funakoshi - Kameoka
- Isao Hashizume - Keiko's father

== Reception ==
Nada Sōsō was nominated for Best Actor (Satoshi Tsumabuki) and Best Actress (Masami Nagasawa) for the 2007 Japanese Academy Awards. However, for the 2007 Bunshun Kiichigo Awards, Nada Sōsō was ranked 4th worst film and Masami Nagasawa as worst actress.

The Japan Times' Mark Schilling comments that the film "has the feel of a more hardscrabble, pure-spirited time and place, when struggle, sacrifice and premature death for the virtuous on-screen heroes were as common as chopsticks." Film critic Victor Chan commends the film, saying, "Nada Sou Sou boasts of all-round great acting by its cast, and its simple but homely style neatly complements the strong rural Okinawan setting, making this movie a classic triple hanky tearjerker which should appeal to not just the young Japanese movie fan, but also older audiences who have been starved for good tearjerkers." Calvin McMillin, reviewing for LoveHKFilm, criticises the relationship between Tsumabuki and Nagasawa, saying they "do a serviceable job as would-be lovers, but both performances are somewhat problematic in execution. Although likeable enough, Tsumabuki doesn't seem to be able to handle the emotional scenes, as it always looks as if he's going to laugh even when he's breaking down in tears." He criticises Nagasawa's acting by stating "[she] is so over-exuberant (perhaps intentionally so) in the initial parts of the film that she's more of a grating presence than an endearing one. However, Nagasawa's performance improves considerably as the more dramatic aspects of the plot kick into overdrive." He also underlines the film's main downfall in trying to "adhere to the "Pure Love" aesthetic [that] the filmmakers completely gloss over the complications that could arise from a blossoming romantic relationship between these step-siblings by purposely avoiding the issue at any cost."
