= Hana Sugisaki =

Japanese actress (born 1997)

- 杉咲 花
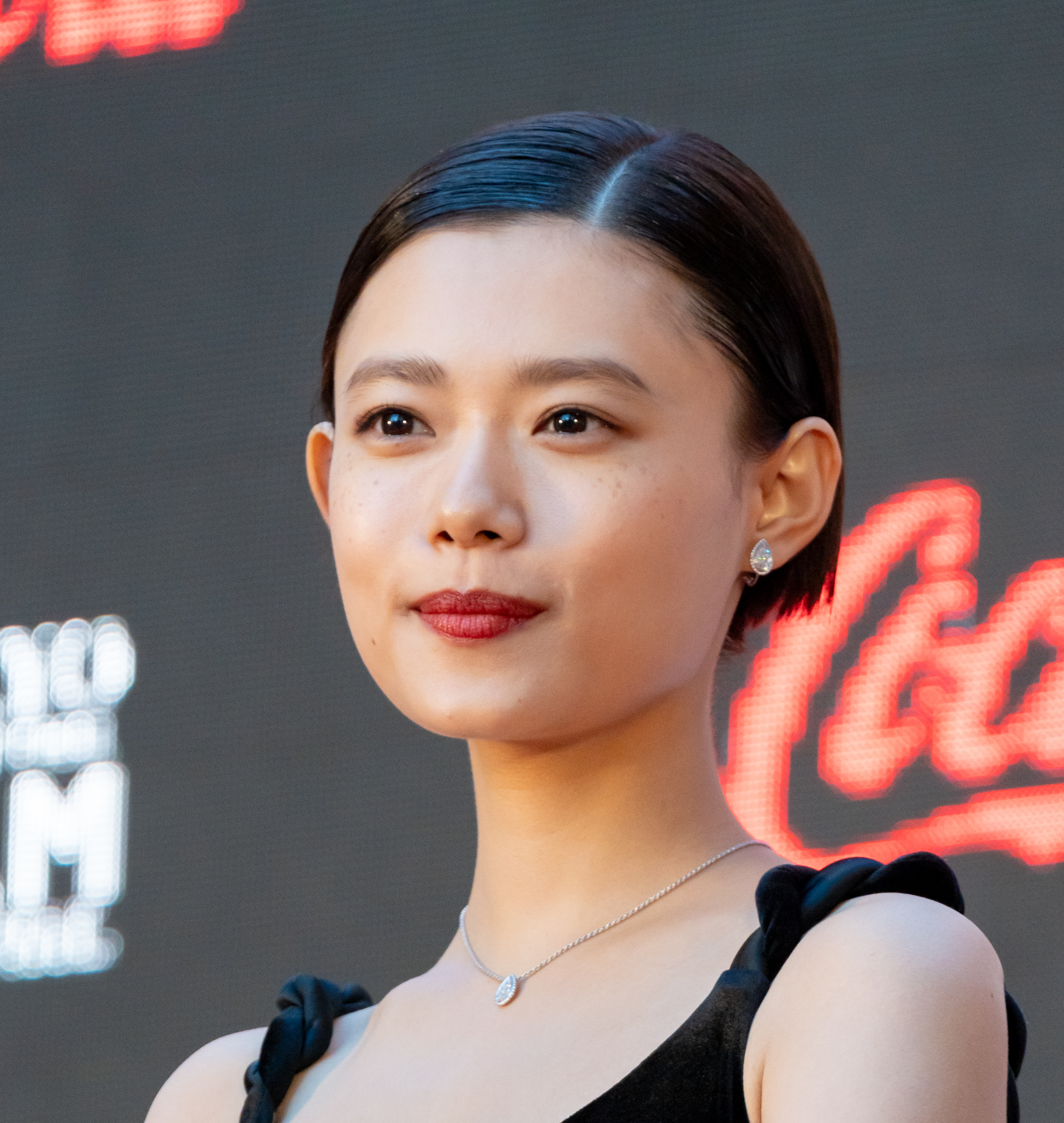
- Sugisaki in 2023
- Born: October 2, 1997 (age 29); Tokyo, Japan
- Other name: Hana Kajiura
- Occupation: Actress
- Years active: 2006–present
- Mother: Chie Kajiura

Hana Sugisaki (杉咲 花, Sugisaki Hana; born October 2, 1997) is a Japanese actress who was previously signed to Stardust Promotion. Her former stage name was Hana Kajiura.

== Biography ==
Sugisaki debuted as a child actress with Stardust Promotion under the stage name Hana Kajiura (梶浦花, Kajiura Hana). She withdrew from the industry for a period of time, but subsequently decided that she wanted to become an actress. She chose it to sign with the Ken-On group, because Mirai Shida, whom Hana is a fan of, belongs to the talent agency. She re-debuted with Ken-On in April 2011.

== Filmography ==
=== Film ===
Year	Title	Role	Notes	Ref.
2012	Ouran High School Host Club	Reiko Kanazuki		
2012	Humanoid Monster, Bem	Yui Natsume		
2013	Madam Marmalade no Ijō na Nazo: Question	Sachiko Tsutsui		
2013	Madam Marmalade no Ijō na Nazo: Answer	Sachiko Tsutsui		
2014	Unsung Hero	Ayumi Motomura		
2015	When Marnie Was There	Sayaka (voice)		
2015	The Pearls of the Stone Man	Sae Ueda		
2015	Mozu The Movie	Megumi Ōsugi		
2015	A Stitch of Life	Yuki		
2015	Pieta in the Toilet	Mai		
2016	Scanner	Ami Akiyama		
2016	Her Love Boils Bathwater	Azumi		
2017	Blade of the Immortal	Rin Asano		
2017	Mary and the Witch's Flower	Mary (voice)	Lead role	
2018	Bleach	Rukia Kuchiki		
2018	Perfect World	Tsugumi Kawana	Lead role	
2018	Ten Years Japan	Maika	Lead role, segment "Data"	
2019	The Promised Land	Tsumugi Yukawa		
2019	12 Suicidal Teens	Anri	Lead role	
2020	All About March	Sakura Watanabe		
2020	Blue, Painful, Fragile	Hisano Akiyoshi	Lead role	
2021	Words Bubble Up Like Soda Pop	Smile (voice)	Lead role	
2021	The Great Yokai War: Guardians	Fox-Faced Woman		
2021	99.9 Criminal Lawyer: The Movie	Honoka Kōno		
2022	Break of Dawn	Yūma Sawatari (voice)	Lead role	
2023	We're Broke, My Lord!	Sayo		
2023	The Innocent Game	Mirei Orimoto		
2023	Ichiko	Ichiko	Lead role	
2023	The Imaginary	Aurora (voice)		
2024	52-Hertz Whales	Kiko	Lead role	
2024	Sakura	Izumi Moriguchi	Lead role	
2025	Unreachable	Yuka	Lead role	
2025	Meets the World	Yukari	Lead role	
2025	Emergency Interrogation Room: The Final Movie	Nao Makabe		

=== Television drama ===
Year	Title	Role	Notes	Ref.
2011	Ouran High School Host Club	Reiko Kanazuki	Episodes 7-11	
2011	Don Quixote	Rina Takazawa	Episode 7	
2011	Humanoid Monster, Bem	Yui Natsume		
2012	Resident: Story of 5 Interns	Ruka Ueno	Episode 4	
2013	Ferris Wheel at Night	Ayaka Endo		
2013	Nameless Poison	Michika Furuya	Episodes 6-11	
2014	Emergency Interrogation Room	Nao Makabe		
2014	Mysterious Transfer Student	Asuka		
2014	Shinigami-kun	Hitomi Saionji	Episode 3	
2014	Mozu	Megumi Osugi	2 seasons	
2015	The Girl's Speech	Mimori Kōda		
2016	Daddy Sister	Yoshiko Kohashi	Asadora	
2016	Montage	Natsumi Nakano	Miniseries	
2018	Boys Over Flowers Season 2	Oto Edogawa	Lead role	
2019	Idaten	Shima and Riku	Taiga drama	
2019	Temp Staff Mind Reader Ataru	Ataru Matoba	Lead role	
2020–21	Ochoyan	Chiyo Takei	Lead role; Asadora	
2021	Love's in Sight!	Yukiko Akaza	Lead role	
2022	Prism	Satsuki	Lead role	
2023	A Day-Off of Hana Sugisaki	Herself	Lead role	
2024	The Diamond Sleeping Under the Sea	Asako		
2024–27	Unmet: A Neurosurgeon's Diary	Miyabi Kawauchi	Lead role: 2 seasons	
2026	Sounds of Winter	Ayana Tsuchida	Lead role	
2026	Chloe et Emma	Emma	Lead role; miniseries	

=== Other television ===
Year	Title	Notes	Ref.
2020	71st NHK Kōhaku Uta Gassen	As a judge	

=== Radio ===
Year	Title	Role	Notes	Ref.
2018–2021	Sugisaki Hana no Flower Tokyo	Host		

== Awards and nominations ==
Year	Award	Category	Work(s)	Result	Ref.
2015	7th Tama Film Awards	Best New Actress	A Stitch of Life, The Pearls of the Stone Man, Pieta in the Toilet	Won	
2016	29th Nikkan Sports Film Awards	Best Newcomer	Her Love Boils Bathwater, Scanner	Nominated	
2016	Yubari International Fantastic Film Festival	New Wave Actress	Pieta in the Toilet	Won	
2016	70th Mainichi Film Awards	Best Newcomer Actress	Pieta in the Toilet	Nominated	
2016	25th Tokyo Sports Film Awards	Best Newcomer	Pieta in the Toilet	Nominated	
2016	11th Osaka Cinema Festival	Best Newcomer Actress	The Pearls of the Stone Man, Pieta in the Toilet	Won	
2016	37th Yokohama Film Festival	Best Newcomer	The Pearls of the Stone Man, Pieta in the Toilet	Won	
2016	41st Hochi Film Awards	Best Supporting Actress	Her Love Boils Bathwater	Won	
2016	41st Hochi Film Awards	Best New Artist	Her Love Boils Bathwater	Nominated	
2016	59th Blue Ribbon Awards	Best Supporting Actress	Her Love Boils Bathwater	Won	
2016	59th Blue Ribbon Awards	Best Newcomer	Her Love Boils Bathwater	Nominated	
2017	38th Yokohama Film Festival	Best Supporting Actress	Her Love Boils Bathwater	Won	
2017	71st Mainichi Film Awards	Best Supporting Actress	Her Love Boils Bathwater	Nominated	
2017	26th Tokyo Sports Film Awards	Best Newcomer	Her Love Boils Bathwater	Won	
2017	12th Osaka Cinema Festival	Best Supporting Actress	Her Love Boils Bathwater	Won	
2017	40th Japan Academy Film Prize	Best Supporting Actress	Her Love Boils Bathwater	Won	
2017	40th Japan Academy Film Prize	Newcomer of the Year	Her Love Boils Bathwater	Won	
2017	26th Japanese Movie Critics Awards	Best Supporting Actress	Her Love Boils Bathwater	Won	
2017	90th Kinema Junpo Awards	Best Supporting Actress	Her Love Boils Bathwater, Scanner	Won	
2017	42nd Hochi Film Awards	Best Supporting Actress	Blade of the Immortal	Nominated	
2018	12th Asian Film Awards	Best Supporting Actress	Blade of the Immortal	Nominated	
2018	6th Japan Action Awards	Best Action Actress - Excellence Award	Blade of the Immortal	Won	
2018	42nd Elan d'or Awards	Newcomer of the Year	Blade of the Immortal, Mary and the Witch's Flower	Won	
2019	7th Japan Action Awards	Best Action Actress - Excellence Award	Bleach	Won	
2019	44th Hochi Film Awards	Best Supporting Actress	12 Suicidal Teens, The Promised Land	Nominated	
2022	51st Best Dressed Awards	Public Entertainment/Sport Category		Won	
2022	30th Hashida Awards	Rookie Actress of the Year	Ochoyan, Love's In Sight	Won	
2024	78th Mainichi Film Awards	Best Actress	Ichiko	Won	
2024	47th Japan Academy Film Prize	Best Actress	Ichiko	Nominated	
2024	37th Nikkan Sports Film Awards	Best Actress	Ichiko, 52-Hertz Whales, Sakura	Nominated	
2025	46th Yokohama Film Festival	Best Actress	Ichiko, 52-Hertz Whales, Sakura	Won	
2025	67th Blue Ribbon Awards	Best Actress	52-Hertz Whales and Sakura	Nominated	
2025	18th Tokyo Drama Awards	Best Supporting Actress	The Diamond Sleeping Under the Sea	Won	
