= Masami Nagasawa =

Japanese actress (born 1987)

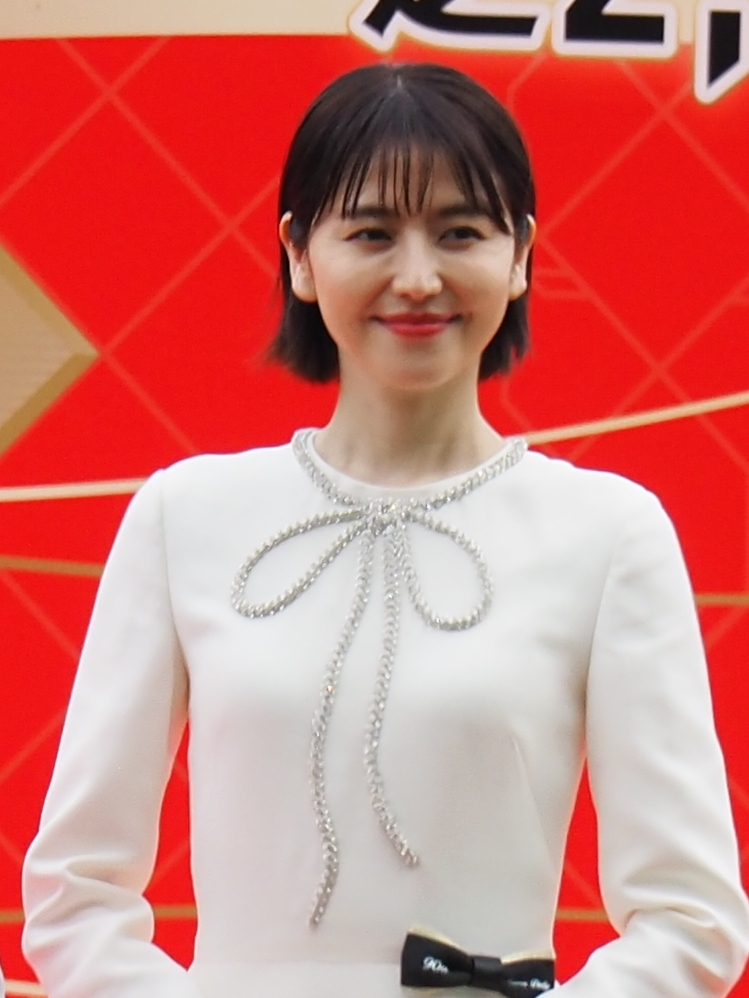
- Nagasawa at the 90th Tōkyō Yūshun Award Ceremony in May 2023
- Born: June 3, 1987 (age 39); Iwata, Shizuoka, Japan
- Occupation: Actress
- Years active: 2000–present
- Height: 169 cm (5 ft 6 1/2 in)
- Spouse: Takeshi Fukunaga (m. 2026)
- Father: Kazuaki Nagasawa
- Awards: Blue Ribbon Award; Japan Academy Prize; Mainichi Film Award

Masami Nagasawa (長澤 まさみ, Nagasawa Masami; born June 3, 1987) is a Japanese actress. She has had a prolific film career since her teenage years and has starred in various blockbusters, receiving multiple accolades, including five Japan Academy Film Prizes and four Blue Ribbon Awards.

Nagasawa began her acting career at age twelve, when she starred as a young psychic orphan in the science fiction film Pyrokinesis (2000). While in high school, she starred as one of the Shobijin in Godzilla: Tokyo S.O.S. (2003) and Godzilla: Final Wars (2004) and would gain recognition for her leading role in Crying Out Love in the Center of the World (2004), for which she won the Blue Ribbon Award for Best Supporting Actress and two Japan Academy Film Prize awards.

In 2007, Nagasawa was nominated for the Japan Academy Film Prize for Best Leading Actress and attained a Bunshun Raspberry Award for playing the title character in Tears for You (2006). Nagasawa's career progressed with her starring roles as Princess Yuki in Shinji Higuchi's Hidden Fortress: The Last Princess (2008), Umi Matsuzaki in Gorō Miyazaki's From Up on Poppy Hill (2011), and Miyuki Matsuo in the romantic comedy Love Strikes! (2011), for which she earned a second Blue Ribbon Award for Best Supporting Actress.

After playing a supporting character in Makoto Shinkai's Your Name (2016), she portrayed the protagonist in the critically acclaimed science fiction drama Before We Vanish (2017), for which she won the Mainichi Film Award for Best Actress. In 2019, she starred in the crime mystery Masquerade Hotel and portrayed Yang Duan He in the action-adventure Kingdom, for which she was nominated for a Nikkan Sports Film Award; she later reprised the role of Yang Duan He in the 2023 film Kingdom: Flame of Destiny. Nagasawa has also played Dako in The Confidence Man JP film trilogy (2019-2022), Anna Kobayashi in Chen Sicheng's buddy-comedy Detective Chinatown 3 (2021), Hiroko Asami in Higuchi's critically acclaimed superhero film Shin Ultraman (2022), and Scorpion-Aug in Hideaki Anno's Shin Kamen Rider (2023).

== Early life and background ==
Nagasawa was born on June 3, 1987, in Iwata, Shizuoka. She stated that during her childhood, her father, the former Júbilo Iwata manager Kazuaki Nagasawa, "wasn't at home much because of work". She has an older brother who actress Yoshino Kimura described as "handsome" and Nagasawa described as "cool".

== Career ==
=== Film ===
In 2000, Nagasawa won the Grand Prix at the 5th Toho Cinderella Audition, prevailing 35,153 female competitors. After winning the competition, Toho instructed director Shusuke Kaneko to give her a role in his science fiction action film Pyrokinesis. She played Kurata, an orphan child who has psychic powers such as pyrokinesis and psychometry. At the wrap party for the film, Kaneko said she had "no experience and directing her was a pain in the ass". Two years later she played minor roles in Nobuhiko Obayashi's Nagori Yuki and Akihiko Shiota's Yomigaeri. She also starring as one of the Shobijin in Godzilla: Tokyo S.O.S. (2003) and Godzilla: Final Wars (2004). Her first lead role in a film was in 2003's Robot Contest.

Nagasawa's performance in Crying Out Love in the Center of the World received both a Blue Ribbon Award and a Japan Academy Prize for Best Supporting Actress.

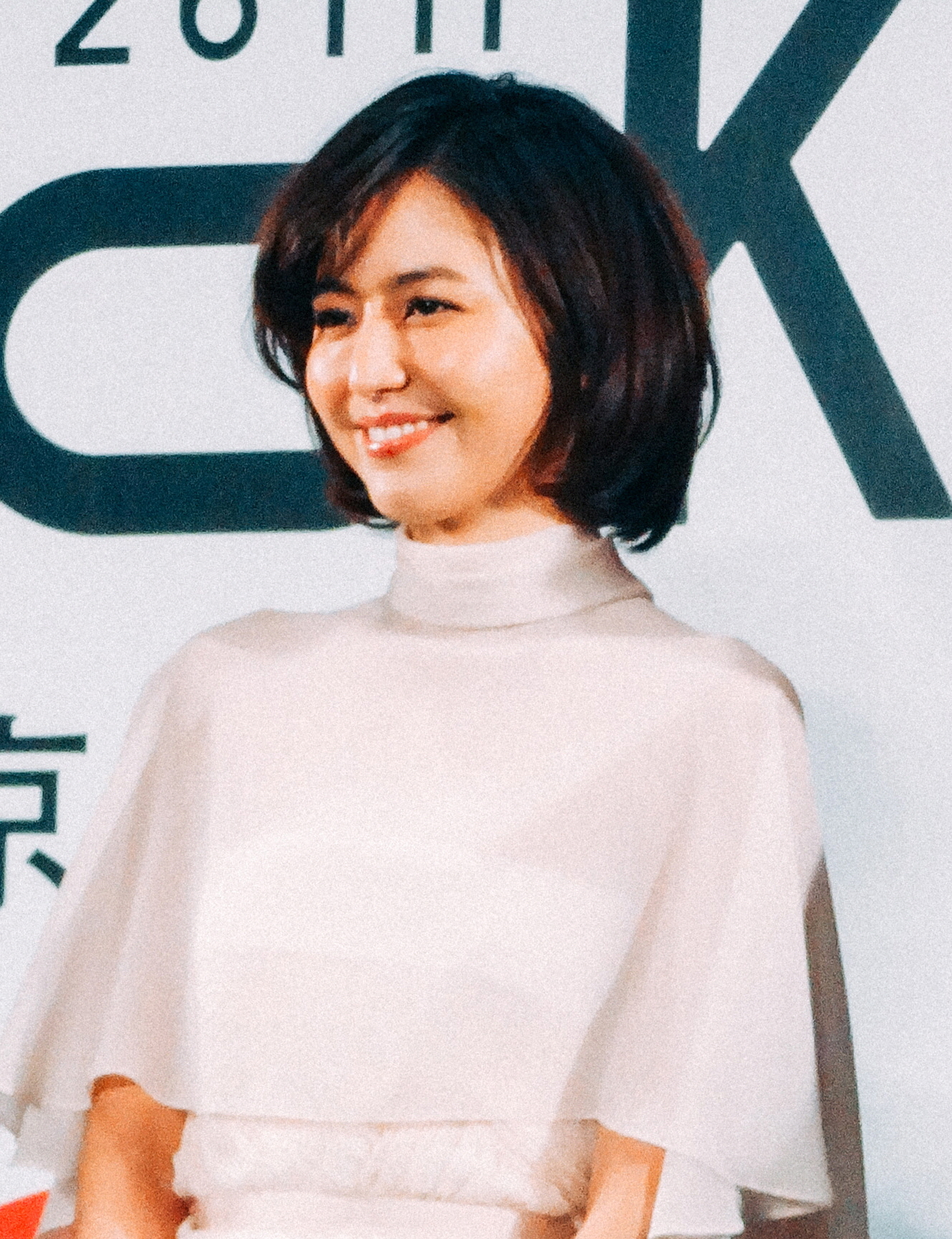
Nagasawa at the 26th Tokyo International Film Festival.

In 2007, she received a Japan Academy Prize nomination in the Best Actress category for her performance in the 2006 film Nada Sōsō (Tears for You). After a string of less notable films, including Gunjo and Magare Spoon!, she starred in the 2011 film adaptation of Mitsurō Kubo's manga Moteki. Her performance in Moteki won Nagasawa a Blue Ribbon Award for Best Supporting Actress, and she was nominated for a Japan Academy Award in the Best Actress category. That same year Nagasawa expanded into voice acting by providing the voice of character "Umi Matsuzaki" in the Studio Ghibli film From Up on Poppy Hill. In 2016 she provided the voice for the character "Miki Okudera" in the international hit Your Name.

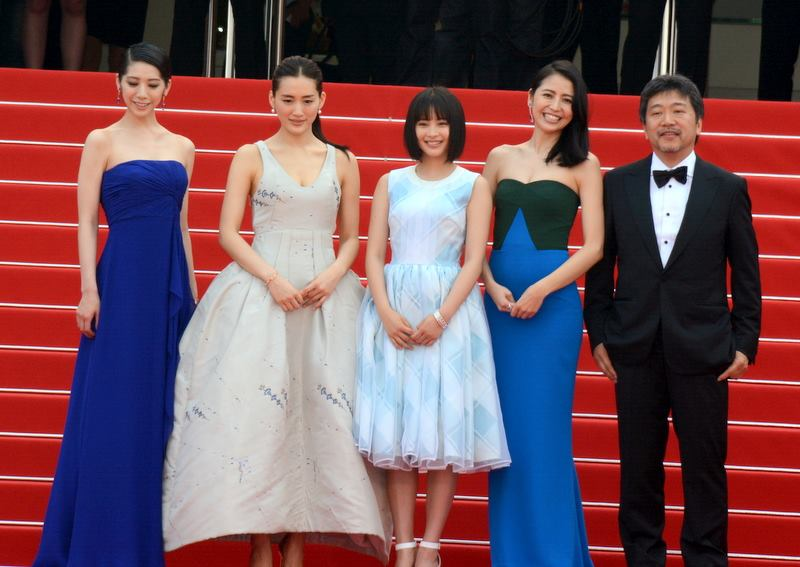
Nagasawa (second from right) at the 2015 Cannes Film Festival.

Her live action films have also received international attention. Kiyoku Yawaku (Beyond the Memories), a live action adaptation of Ryo Ikuemi's manga series, was screened at the 17th annual Japanese Film Festival in Melbourne, Australia in 2013. Umimachi Diary (Our Little Sister), a live action adaptation of Akimi Yoshida's manga, competed for the Palme d'Or at the 2015 Cannes Film Festival. In 2017 Nagasawa starred in the Kiyoshi Kurosawa film Before We Vanish, which competed in the Un Certain Regard category at the 2017 Cannes Film Festival. Her performance in Before We Vanish also received recognition in Japan, winning a Mainichi Film Award for Best Lead Actress, and earning a nomination for a Japan Academy Prize for Outstanding Performance by an Actress in a Leading Role.

In 2018, she starred in 50 First Kisses, a Japanese remake of the 2004 American film 50 First Dates.

=== Television ===
Nagasawa starred in many Japanese television drama series. Early supporting roles in the 2002 NHK asadora Sakura and the 2005 Tokyo Broadcasting System Television live action manga adaptation Dragon Zakura led to more TV work, including a leading role in the 2007 Fuji TV series Proposal Daisakusen (Operation Love). Her performance in Proposal Daisakusen (Operation Love) received the most votes in the Nikkan Sports Drama Grand Prix Best Actress category.

After her initial success in television, Nagasawa continued to perform in both supporting and leading television drama roles. In 2009 she played a supporting role in the NHK taiga drama Tenchijin, and in 2010 she joined several other leading Japanese actors in the Fuji TV 50th anniversary mini-series Wagaya no Rekishi. In 2012 her performance in the TV Asahi drama Toshi densetsu no onna won the 73rd Television Drama Academy Best Actress Award. In 2013 she learned Chinese to play a leading role in the Taiwan Television adaptation of the manga series Chocolat. Nagasawa returned to NHK in the 2016 taiga drama Sanada Maru.

== Stage ==
Nagasawa appeared with Jun Matsumoto and Eita Nagayama in Hideki Noda's Sei sankaku kankei (正三角関係, Trilateral connection). Performances were at Tokyo Metropolitan Theatre, in Kitakyushu and Osaka, as well as Sadler's Wells Theatre in London, under the name of "Love in action", running from July 11 until November 2, 2024.

== Personal life ==
Nagasawa lives in Meguro, Tokyo. On January 1, 2026, Nagasawa's agency announced her marriage to director Takeshi Fukunaga.

== Filmography ==
=== Film ===
Year	Title	Role	Notes	Ref.
2000	Pyrokinesis	Kaori Kurata	Acting debut	
2002	Nagori Yuki	Maho Mizuta		
2003	Yomigaeri	Naomi Morishita		
2003	Godzilla: Tokyo S.O.S.	Mana, one of the Shobijin		
2003	Robot Contest	Satomi Hazawa	Lead role	
2003	Like Asura	Yōko Satomi		
2004	Crying Out Love in the Center of the World	Aki Hirose	Lead role	
2004	Breathe In, Breathe Out	Kanako Doi		
2004	Godzilla: Final Wars	One of the Shobijin		
2005	Touch	Minami Asakura	Lead role	
2006	Rough	Ami Ninomiya	Lead role	
2006	Tears for You	Kaoru	Lead role	
2007	Say Hello for Me	Karin Takigawa/Suzune Morikawa	Lead role	
2008	Hidden Fortress: The Last Princess	Princess Yuki		
2008	La Maison en Petits Cubes	Narrator		
2009	Cobalt Blue	Ryoko Nakamura	Lead role	
2009	Go Find a Psychic!	Yone Sakurai	Lead role	
2010	Sunshine Ahead	Churashima Okinawa Ambassador		
2011	Gaku: Minna no Yama	Kumi Shiina		
2011	From Up on Poppy Hill	Umi Matsuzaki (voice)	Lead role	
2011	Love Strikes!	Miyuki Matsuo		
2011	I Wish	Kōchi Mimura		
2012	Japan's Wildlife: The Untold Story	Narrator		
2013	Beyond the Memories	Kanna Seto	Lead role	
2013	The Last Chance: Diary of Comedians	Kumi		
2014	Wood Job!	Naoki Ishii		
2014	The Crossing Part 1	Masako Shimura	Chinese-Hong Kong film	
2015	Our Little Sister	Yoshino Kōda	Lead role	
2015	The Crossing Part 2	Masako Shimura	Chinese-Hong Kong film	
2015	I Am a Hero	Yabu / Tsugumi Oda		
2016	Good Morning Show	Keiko Ogawa		
2016	Gold Medal Man	Ms. Sano, teacher		
2016	Your Name	Miki Okudera (voice)		
2017	Reminiscence	Minako Shikata		
2017	Gintama	Tae Shimura		
2017	Before We Vanish	Narumi Kase	Lead role	
2018	Doraemon: Nobita's Treasure Island	Fiona (voice)	Guest appearance	
2018	The Lies She Loved	Yukari Kawahara	Lead role	
2018	50 First Kisses	Rui Fujishima	Lead role	
2018	Gintama 2	Tae Shimura		
2018	Bleach	Masaki Kurosaki		
2019	Masquerade Hotel	Naomi Yamagishi		
2019	Kingdom	Yang Duan He		
2019	The Confidence Man JP: The Movie	Dako	Lead role	
2020	The Confidence Man JP: Episode of the Princess	Dako	Lead role	
2020	Mother	Akiko Misumi	Lead role	
2021	Detective Chinatown 3	Anna Kobayashi	Chinese film	
2021	Under the Open Sky	Yoshizawa		
2021	Masquerade Night	Naomi Yamagishi		
2022	The Confidence Man JP: Episode of the Hero	Dako	Lead role	
2022	Shin Ultraman	Hiroko Asami		
2022	A Hundred Flowers	Kaori Kasai		
2023	Shin Kamen Rider	Scorpion Augment-01		
2023	Do Unto Others	Hidemi Ōtomo		
2023	Kingdom 3: The Flame of Destiny	Yang Duan He		
2024	The Parades	Minako	Lead role	
2024	April Come She Will	Yayoi Sakamoto		
2024	Kingdom 4: Return of the Great General	Yang Duan He		
2024	All About Suomi	Suomi	Lead role	
2025	Dollhouse	Yoshie Suzuki	Lead role	
2025	Hokusai's Daughter	Katsushika Ōi	Lead role	
2026	Between Two Lovers	Uta	Lead role	
2026	Godzilla Minus Zero	Makoto Aoyama		

=== Dubbing ===
Year	Title	Role	Notes	Ref(s)
2016	Sing	Ash	2017 Japanese dub	
2021	Sing 2	Ash	2022 Japanese dub	

=== Television ===
Year	Title	Role	Notes	Ref.
2001	Pure Soul	Maru Seta		
2002	Sakura	Kanako Numata	Asadora	
2004	True Horror Story	Mayu Morimoto		
2004	Runaway	Onizuka Sari		
2004	Mystery Theater: Satsujin Stunt	Hitomi Takamizawa	Guest	
2005	Affectionate Time	Azusa Minagawa		
2005	Hiroshima Showa 20 nen 8 Gatsu Muika	Maki Yajima	TV movie	
2005–2021	Dragon Sakura	Naomi Mizuno	2 seasons	
2006	Kōmyō ga Tsuji	Korin	Taiga drama	
2006	Sailor Suit and Machine Gun	Hoshi Izumi	Lead role	
2007	Akechi Mitsuhide	Tsumaki Hiroko	TV movie	
2007	Romeo and Juliet	Juliet Kihira		
2007	The Reason Mama Cooks	Miyuki Kouda	Special appearance	
2007	Proposal Daisakusen	Rei Yoshida	Lead role	
2007	Butterfly Stroke in Ganges River	Teruko Takano	Lead role	
2007	20 Year Old Lover	Sawada Yuri	Lead role	
2008	Proposal Daikusen SP	Rei Yoshida	Lead role	
2008	Last Friends	Michiru Aida	Lead role	
2008	Galileo: Episode Zero	Akari Shionoya		
2008	Fujiko F. Fujio no Parallel Space Nebumi Camera	Takeko	Lead role	
2009	Tenchijin	Hatsune	Taiga drama	
2009	Soka, Mo Kimi wa Inai no Ka	Yōko	TV movie	
2009	My Sister	Saya	Lead role	
2010	Sotsu Uta	Hitomi Tachibana	Lead role	
2010	Wagaya no Rekishi	Yukari Ichinose	Mini-series	
2010	Gold	Rika		
2012	Bunshin	Mariko/Futaba/Akiko	Lead role; miniseries	
2012	High School Entrance Exam	Kyōko Haruyama	Lead role	
2012–2013	I Love Tokyo Legend - Kawaii Detective	Tsukiko Otonashi	Lead role; 2 seasons	
2013	Chocolat	Chie Tatsumi	Lead role; Taiwanese drama	
2013	Summer Nude	Kasumi Ichikura		
2014	All About My Siblings	Takako Yashiro		
2016	Sanada Maru	Kiri	Taiga drama	
2018	The Confidence Man JP	Dako	Lead role	
2022	The 13 Lords of the Shogun	Narrator	Taiga drama	
2022	Elpis	Ena Asakawa	Lead role	

== Stage ==
Year	Title	Role	Notes
2024	Sei sankaku kankei (Love in Action)		

== Awards and nominations ==
Year	Award	Category	Nominated work	Result	Ref.
2004	25th Yokohama Film Festival	Best New Talent	Like Asura, Robot Contest	Won	
2004	27th Japan Academy Film Prize	Newcomer of the Year	Robot Contest	Won	
2005	29th Elan d'or Awards	Newcomer of the Year		Won	
2005	47th Blue Ribbon Awards	Best Supporting Actress	Crying Out Love in the Center of the World	Won	
2005	28th Japan Academy Film Prize	Best Supporting Actress	Crying Out Love in the Center of the World	Won	
2005	28th Japan Academy Film Prize	Popularity Award Winner	Crying Out Love in the Center of the World	Won	
2007	4th Bunshun Raspberry Awards	Best Actress	Tears for You	Won	
2007	30th Japan Academy Film Prize	Best Actress	Tears for You	Nominated	
2007	11th Nikkan Sports Drama Grand Prix	Best Actress	Proposal Daisakusen	Nominated	
2012	54th Blue Ribbon Awards	Best Supporting Actress	Love Strikes!	Won	
2012	35th Japan Academy Film Prize	Best Actress	Love Strikes!	Nominated	
2012	11th New York Asian Film Festival	Star Asia Rising Star Award	Love Strikes!	Won	
2012	VoCE Beauty Awards	The Best Beauty of The Year		Won	
2018	72nd Mainichi Film Awards	Best Actress	Before We Vanish	Won	
2018	41st Japan Academy Film Prize	Best Actress	Before We Vanish	Nominated	
2019	44th Hochi Film Awards	Best Actress	Masquerade Hotel, The Confidence Man JP: The Movie	Won	
2019	32nd Nikkan Sports Film Awards	Best Supporting Actress	Masquerade Hotel, Kingdom	Nominated	
2020	62nd Blue Ribbon Awards	Best Actress	The Confidence Man JP: The Movie	Won	
2020	62nd Blue Ribbon Awards	Best Supporting Actress	Masquerade Hotel, Kingdom	Nominated	
2020	43rd Japan Academy Film Prize	Best Supporting Actress	Kingdom	Won	
2020	45th Hochi Film Awards	Best Actress	Mother, The Confidence Man JP: Episode of the Princess	Nominated	
2020	33rd Nikkan Sports Film Awards	Best Actress	Mother, The Confidence Man JP: Episode of the Princess	Won	
2021	63rd Blue Ribbon Awards	Best Actress	Mother, The Confidence Man JP: Episode of the Princess	Won	
2021	75th Mainichi Film Awards	Best Actress	Mother	Nominated	
2021	44th Japan Academy Film Prize	Best Actress	Mother	Won	
2021	44th Japan Academy Film Prize	Best Actress	The Confidence Man JP: Episode of the Princess	Nominated	
2021	46th Hochi Film Awards	Best Actress	Masquerade Night	Nominated	
2025	67th Blue Ribbon Awards	Best Actress	All About Suomi	Nominated	
2026	80th Mainichi Film Awards	Best Lead Performance	Hokusai's Daughter	Nominated	
2026	49th Japan Academy Film Prize	Best Actress	Dollhouse	Nominated	
2026	39th Nikkan Sports Film Awards	Best Supporting Actress	Godzilla Minus Zero	Pending	
