= Why Didn't I Tell You a Million Times? =

Japanese television series

- Japanese: 100万回 言えばよかった
- Genre: Crime drama; Romance; Fantasy
- Written by: Naoko Adachi
- Starring: Mao Inoue; Takeru Satoh; Kenichi Matsuyama
- Ending theme: "Ringyu Love" by Macaroni Pencil
- Country of origin: Japan
- Original language: Japanese
- No. of episodes: 10

Production
- Production companies: TBS Sparkle; TBS TV

Original release
- Network: TBS
- Release: January 13 – March 17, 2023

Why Didn't I Tell You a Million Times? (Japanese: 100万回 言えばよかった, Hepburn: 100 mankai Ieba Yokatta) is a 2023 Japanese television series starring Mao Inoue, Takeru Satoh, and Kenichi Matsuyama. The show aired on TBS and was written by Naoko Adachi.

It is streamed globally by Netflix.

== Synopsis ==
Yui Soma (Mao Inoue), a hairdresser, reunites with Naoki Torino (Takeru Satoh), a chef, who lived with the same foster parents when she was a junior high school student. They start dating, but then Naoki suddenly disappears. Yui meets detective Yuzuru Uozumi (Kenichi Matsuyama) at the police station where she files a search request for Naoki. Uozumi sees Naoki in the city while investigating the murder of another woman and discovers that he is a ghost. Naoki, Uozumi, and Yui work together to uncover the mystery around Naoki's death and the death of the woman.

== Cast ==
=== Main characters ===
- Mao Inoue as Yui Soma
- Takeru Satoh as Naoki Torino
- Kenichi Matsuyama as Yuzuru Uozumi

=== Supporting characters ===
- Shim Eun-kyung as Song Ha-young
- Karina Nose as Rio Ozaki
- Toshiyuki Itakura as Masamichi Higuchi
- Shunpūtei Shōta as Masaru Hirota
- Yoshiyoshi Arakawa as Eisuke Ikezawa
- Chihiro Kondo as Suzuka Takahara
- Kami Hiraiwa as Kanae Uozumi, Yuzuru's sister
