= School Days with a Pig =

- Film poster
- Directed by: Tetsu Maeda
- Written by: Hirotoshi Kobayashi, Yasushi Kuroda (novel)
- Produced by: Toshihiro Isomi
- Starring: Satoshi Tsumabuki, Mieko Harada, Ren Osugi
- Cinematography: Yasuhito Kasai
- Edited by: Koichi Takahashi
- Production company: Nikkatsu
- Distributed by: Nikkatsu
- Release date: 1 November 2008 (Japan)
- Running time: 109 minutes
- Country: Japan
- Language: Japanese
- Box office: US$92,400

School Days with a Pig (Japanese: ブタがいた教室, Hepburn: Buta ga ita Kyōshitsu) is a 2008 Japanese drama film that is based on a true event that took place in an elementary school in Osaka Prefecture. The film is directed by Tetsu Maeda, and its story is based on a novel about the event by Yasushi Kuroda. Actor Satoshi Tsumabuki plays the lead role of the class teacher in this film. Additionally, this film stars 28 school children chosen by audition.

School Days with a Pig was first screened at the 21st Tokyo International Film Festival, and it was subsequently released in Japanese cinemas on 1 November 2008.

== Plot ==
The film revolves around the story of an elementary school teacher who proposes that his class raise a piglet at school with the aim of eating it once it has grown up.

== Cast ==
- Satoshi Tsumabuki as Mr. Hoshi, the class homeroom teacher
- Ren Ohsugi as Mr. Nishina (school Vice Principal)
- Tomoko Tabata as Ms. Ikezawa
- Seiji Ikeda as Mr. Kowasi
- Mieko Harada as School Principal Mrs. Takahara
- Ryohei Kondo
- Runa Natsui
- Itsumi Osawa
- Yumi Shimizu as the music teacher
- Pierre Taki
- Naho Toda

=== Students ===
==== Year 6 Class 2 Students ====
- Amari Haruna (甘利はるな) as Amari Hana (甘利花)
- Azumakei Futoshi (東圭太) as Kei Futoshi (圭太)
- Ikeda Ayayuka (池田彩由佳) as Iijimaa Yayuka (飯島彩由佳)
- Ishii Chiya (石井千也) as Chiya (千也)
- Sumire Ishikawa (石川すみれ) as Sumire (すみれ)
- Nobuya Enoki (榎木伸哉) as Nobuya Unoki (鵜木伸哉)
- Natsuki Itō (伊藤奈月) as Natsuki (奈月)
- Yui Ōwada (大和田結衣) as Yui (結衣)
- Hiroshishin Ōkura (大倉裕真) as Tsuyoshiba Ōta (太田雄馬)
- Mizuki Ogawa (小川美月) as Mizuki (美月)
- Shunto Oka (岡駿斗) as Shunto (駿斗)
- Yuzurishi Da (柚りし菓) as Okamoto Reina (岡本れいな)
- Hiroshi-Kino Ogata (緒方博紀) as Hiroshi-Kino (博紀)
- Kaneko Umion (金子海音) as Umion (海音)
- Tsukasa Kakizawa (柿澤司) as Tsukasa Kakizawa (柿澤司)
- Minori Saitō (斉藤みのり) as Minori (みのり)
- Mikiowataru Kageyama (影山樹生弥) as Mikiowataru (樹生弥)
- Maira Sakuragi (櫻木麻衣羅) as Maira (麻衣羅)
- Rikiya Kabazawa (樺澤力也) as Rikiya Kabazawa (樺澤力也)
- Azuki Sakura (桜あずき) as Azuki (あずき)
- Takumiumi Kitamura (北村匠海) as Takujitsu (拓実)
- Nana Shinkawa (新川奈々) as Nana (奈々)
- Eihisashi Terada (寺田英永) as Eihisashi (英永)
- Runa Natsukyo (夏居瑠奈) as Runa Naba (名波ルナ)
- Ryūka Mukae (向江流架) as Ryūka (流架)
- Sainobana Matsubara (松原菜野花) as Sainobana Matsubara (松原菜野花)

== Production ==
School Days with a Pig was first announced on 25 August 2008.

=== Music ===
The theme song for the film School Days with a Pig is the song Hana no yō ni hoshi no yō ni (花のように星のように, lit: Like a Flower, like a star) that is sung by singer Tortoise Matsumoto. This was announced together with the announcement of this film on 25 August 2008.

- 「Prayer」 Lyrics By：Tatsu Maeda (前田哲) Lyrics (English) by ：Lynne Hobdny Songwriter： 吉岡聖治 歌：清水ゆみ

== Release ==
This film was first released at the 21st Tokyo International Film Festival, where it was one of the films participating in the competition. It was then released in Japan cinemas on 1 November 2008.

Later, this film was released in Singapore on 8 April 2009. It was also released in Taiwan on 10 April 2009 and in Hong Kong on 27 August 2009 under the name of (Chinese: 和豬豬一起上課的日子; pinyin: Hé zhū zhū yīqǐ shàngkè de rìzi).

=== Home Video ===
The home video was released in DVD (Region 2) format on Amazon Japan on 4 October 2009. A special limited 2-disc edition was also released on the same day.

== Reception ==
According to this movie's Taiwanese release official site, more audiences did not want to eat the pig as compared to those who voted to eat the pig.

=== Accolades ===
| Award | Date of ceremony | Category | Recipients | Result |
|---|---|---|---|---|
| 28th Tokyo International Film Festival | 2008 | Audience Award | School Days with a Pig | Won |
| Zlín International Film Festival for Children and Youth | 2009 | Award of the City of Zlín | School Days with a Pig | Won |
| Jeonju International Film Festival | 2009 | JIFF Audience Award | School Days with a Pig | Won |
