= My Back Page =

- DVD cover
- Directed by: Nobuhiro Yamashita
- Written by: Kōsuke Mukai
- Based on: My Back Page: Aru 60-nendai no Monogatari by Saburo Kawamoto
- Starring: Satoshi Tsumabuki; Kenichi Matsuyama; Shioli Kutsuna; Yuya Matsuura; Munetaka Aoki
- Cinematography: Ryuto Kondo
- Edited by: Takashi Sato
- Music by: Shunsuke Kida mito
- Production companies: Wowow; Bitters End; Asmik Ace Entertainment
- Release date: May 28, 2011 (Japan)
- Running time: 141 minutes
- Country: Japan
- Language: Japanese

My Back Page (Japanese: マイ・バック・ページ, Hepburn: Mai bakku pēji) is a 2011 Japanese drama film directed by Nobuhiro Yamashita, director of Linda Linda Linda. It is based on Saburo Kawamoto's memoir My Back Page: Aru 60-nendai no Monogatari, which tells the story of his time as a gonzo journalist following the activities of a radical activist in the 1960s and 1970s.

The film was featured at the 2011 (30th) Vancouver International Film Festival, the 2011 (16th) Busan International Film Festival and the 2011 (55th) BFI London Film Festival.

== Plot ==
The film follows the story of Masami Sawada (played by Satoshi Tsumabuki) joining a left-wing magazine as a gonzo journalist in 1969. He is taken under the wing of the editor and goes to interview Umeyama (Kenichi Matsuyama), who is developing a reputation as a radical - an activist intent on making a violent demonstration. However, Umeyama may not be exactly who he says he is. The film follows the two characters' involvement in the political activist world of 1960s/70s Japan.

== Cast ==
- Satoshi Tsumabuki as Masami Sawada
- Kenichi Matsuyama as Umeyama
- Shioli Kutsuna as Mako Kurata
- Yuya Matsuura as Tomotsu
- Munetaka Aoki as Christ
- Hiroshi Yamamoto as Hitoshi Saeki
- Takeshi Yamamoto as Kiyohara
- Hideki Nakano as Tsugawa
- Daikichi Sugawara as Kobayashi
- Tomokazu Miura as Shiraishi

== Awards ==
- Sponichi Grand Prix Newcomer Award (Shioli Kutsuna) - 2011 (66th) Mainichi Film Awards - January 18, 2012
