= A Tale of Samurai Cooking =

A Tale of Samurai Cooking: A True Love Story
- Film poster
- Kanji: 武士の献立
- Literal meaning: The Samurai's Menu
- Revised Hepburn: Bushi no Kondate
- Directed by: Yūzou Asahara
- Written by: Yūzou Asahara; Yukiko Yamamuro; Michio Kashiwada
- Produced by: Yoshitaka Ishizuka; Hideaki Miyoshi; Fumitsugu Ikeda
- Starring: Aya Ueto; Kengo Kora; Kimiko Yo; Toshiyuki Nishida
- Narrated by: Masatoshi Nakamura
- Cinematography: Yukihiro Okimura
- Edited by: Kazuhide Ishijima
- Music by: Taro Iwashiro
- Production companies: Dentsu; Eisei Gekijo; TV Asahi; Asahi Broadcasting Corporation; Shogakukan; Oscar Promotion
- Distributed by: Shochiku
- Release date: 14 December 2013 (Japan)
- Running time: 122 minutes
- Country: Japan
- Language: Japanese

A Tale of Samurai Cooking (Japanese: 武士の献立, Hepburn: Bushi no Kondate), also known as A Tale of Samurai Cooking: A True Love Story, is a 2013 Japanese film directed by Yūzou Asahara, starring Aya Ueto.

== Cast ==
- Aya Ueto as Funaki Haru
- Kengo Kora as Funaki Yasunobu
- Toshiyuki Nishida as Funaki Den'nai
- Kimiko Yo as Funaki Mitsu
- Yui Natsukawa
- Riko Narumi
- Tasuku Emoto
- Manabu Ino as Maeda Yoshinori
- Naoto Ogata as Ōtsuki Denzō
- Takeshi Kaga as Maeda Naomi
