= Southbound (2007 film) =

- Directed by: Yoshimitsu Morita
- Written by: Yoshimitsu Morita
- Produced by: Tsuguhiko Kadokawa
- Starring: Etsushi Toyokawa; Yūki Amami
- Cinematography: Yukihiro Okimura
- Edited by: Shinji Tanaka
- Music by: Michiru Ōshima
- Distributed by: Kadokawa Pictures
- Release date: October 6, 2007 (Japan)
- Running time: 114 minutes
- Country: Japan
- Language: Japanese

Southbound (Japanese: サウスバウンド, Hepburn: Sausubaundo) is a 2007 Japanese drama film written and directed by Yoshimitsu Morita and starring Toyokawa Etsushi and Yūki Amami. Based on the novel of the same name by Hideo Okuda, it tells the story of a schoolboy whose family moves from Tokyo to Okinawa.

It began filming in May 2007 in Tokyo; the crew went to Okinawa for on-location filming at the end of June. Its theme song is "Eien no Uta" by Nakashima Mika.

== Cast ==
- Etsushi Toyokawa as 'Ichiro Uehara' (as a father who was an extremism activist)
- Yūki Amami as 'Sakura Uehara' (as a mother who was an extremism activist)
- Keiko Kitagawa as 'Yoko Uehara' (as a Sakura's daughter)
- Shuto Tanabe as 'Jiro Uehara' (as a Eldest son. 6th grade schoolboy. This movie's protagonist)
- Rina Matsumoto as 'Momoko Uehara' (as a Second daughter. 4th grade schoolgirl. She loves being bitten by her father)
- Ken'ichi Matsuyama as Officer 'Niigaki' (He fell in love with Yoko at first sight.)
- Mitsuru Hirata as the Principal
- Hideko Yoshida as Social Insurance Agency's Staff
