= Saburo Kawamoto =

Japanese film and literary critic (born 1944)

Saburo Kawamoto (川本 三郎, Kawamoto Saburō; born 15 July 1944) is a Japanese film and literary critic, as well as a professor at Rikkyo University.

After graduation from the University of Tokyo, he worked for the Asahi Newspaper company before leaving in 1972 to become a critic. He was one critic who helped to discover the talents of Haruki Murakami. He won the Suntory Prize for his book Taishū Genei in 1991, the Yomiuri Literature Award for Kafū and Tokyo in 1997, and the Itō Sei Literature Award for Hakushu Bōkei in 2012.

Around 1970 he became close to a student radical when covering him as a journalist. When that student attacked an officer of the Japanese Self-Defence Force in Asaka, Saitama, killing him, Kawamoto was arrested for spoliation of evidence. He was convicted and given a sentence of probation. He was fired from the Asahi Newspaper company. Thereafter, he became a freelance writer. Nobuhiro Yamashita's film, My Back Page, is based on Kawamoto's essay about this affair.

== Works ==
- Taisho illusions 大正幻影
- My Back Page: a 60's story マイ・バック・ページ ある60年代の物語
