= Yukihiro Okimura =

Japanese cinematographer (born 1969)

Yukihiro Okimura (Japanese: 沖村志宏; born 1969) is a Japanese cinematographer.

== Career ==
Yukihiro Okimura was born in 1969 in Osaka Prefecture, Kansai, Japan. He went to Shimizudani High School and the Osaka University of Arts Photography Department, where he started 8 mm film making.

After graduating in 1992, he started working as an assistant cinematographer for Nikkatsu (Japan's oldest major movie studio) on films with Juzo Itami, Yoshimitsu Morita, and Kei Kumai. He also studied camera operation under Yonezo Maeda, Hiroshi Takase, and Shogo Ueno. In 2007, he made his debut as an independent cinematographer with Southbound.

== Selected filmography ==
- Southbound (2007)
- Vacation (休暇, Kyuka; directed by Yoshimitsu Morita) (2008)
- Cinema Kabuki Ninjo Banashi Bunshichi Mottoi (シネマ歌舞伎 人情噺文七元結; directed by Yoji Yamada) (2007–2008)
- Cinema Kabuki Renjishi (シネマ歌舞伎 連獅子, "Two Lions"; directed by Yoji Yamada) (2007–2008)
- Watashi dasu wa (わたし出すわ, "It's on Me") (2009)
- Sawako Decides (川の底からこんにちは, ''Kawa no Soko kara Konnichiwa'', "Hello from the bottom of the river") (2010)
- Bushi no kakeibo (武士の家計簿, "Samurai's Household account book"; known as "Abacus and Sword"; directed by Yoshimitsu Morita) (2010)
- Mitsuko Delivers (ハラがコレなんで, Hara ga Kore Nande) (2011)
- Bokukyû: A ressha de iko (僕達急行 A列車で行こう, Take the "A" Train; directed by Yoshimitsu Morita) (2012)
- A Tale of Samurai Cooking (武士の献立, Bushi no Kondate; directed by Yūzo Asahara) (2013)
- The Magnificent Nine (殿、利息でござる！, Tono, Risoku de Gozaru!; directed by Yoshihiro Nakamura) (2016)

=== As assistant cinematographer ===
- Daibyonin (大病人, ''Daibyōnin'', literally "patient in serious condition"; known as The Last Dance or The Seriously Ill) (1993)
- Heisei Musekinin Ikka: Tokyo Deluxe (平成無責任一家 東京デラックス, "Heisei Irresponsible Family in Tokyo Deluxe"; directed by Yoichi Sai) (1995)
- Shizuka na Seikatsu (静かな生活 ,"A Quiet Life"; directed by Juzo Itami) (1995)
- Haru ((ハル); like as "You've Got Mail") (1996)
- Lost Paradise (失楽園, Shitsurakuen) (1997)
- Keiho (39 刑法第三十九条, 39 Keihō Dai sanjūkyū jō, "Penal Code of Japan, Article 39") (1999)
- The Sea Is Watching (海は見ていた, Umi wa Miteita) (2002)
- Night of Shooting Star (星に願いを。, Hoshi ni Negai o.; directed by Shin Togashi) (2003)
- The Seagull (海猫, Umineko; directed by Yoshimitsu Morita) (2004)
- Christmas on July 24 Avenue (7月24日通りのクリスマス, Shichi Gatsu Nijuu Yokka Doori no Kurisumasu; directed by Shōsuke Murakami) (2006)

=== Video ===
- A Day of One Hero (by Kazuki Shimizu, a Japanese actor best known for his role as Don "Hakase" Dogoier in the 2011 Super Sentai series Kaizoku Sentai Gokaiger. Direct-to-video) (2011)

== Awards ==
- Shibata Award (in Japanese) – Award for outstanding young camera operator by MPTE (Motion Picture and Television Engineering Society of Japan)
