= A Long Goodbye =

2019 Japanese film

- Film poster
- Directed by: Ryōta Nakano
- Written by: Ryōta Nakano; Toshiya Ōno
- Based on: Nagai Owakare by Kyoko Nakajima
- Starring: Yū Aoi; Yuko Takeuchi; Chieko Matsubara; Tsutomu Yamazaki
- Cinematography: Yūta Tsukinaga
- Edited by: Jun'ichi Itō
- Music by: Takashi Watanabe
- Production companies: Dragonfly Entertainment, Asmik Ace
- Distributed by: Asmik Ace
- Release date: May 31, 2019 (Japan)
- Running time: 127 minutes
- Country: Japan
- Language: Japanese

A Long Goodbye (Japanese: 長いお別れ, Hepburn: Nagai Owakare) is a 2019 Japanese family drama film directed by Ryōta Nakano.

== Plot ==
A 70-year-old man informs his wife and daughters that he has Alzheimer's disease. His family members digest the news and each react differently as his illness progresses, but realize there are also some things that he will not forget. The story examines drama of the family members' own individual challenges as they come to deal with their father's illness.

== Production ==
The movie was released on May 31, 2019 and distributed by Asmik Ace Entertainment.

== Cast ==
- Yū Aoi as Fumi Higashi
- Yuko Takeuchi as Mari Imamura (née Higashi)
- Tsutomu Yamazaki as Shōhei Higashi
- Chieko Matsubara as Yōko Higashi
- Yukiya Kitamura as Arata Imamura
- Tomoya Nakamura as Michihiko Iwata
- Rairu Sugita as Takashi Imamura
- Kurumi Shimizu as Mio Konishi
- Akiko Kurano
- Takumi Matsuzawa
