= Our Family =

- Film poster
- Directed by: Yuya Ishii
- Screenplay by: Yuya Ishii
- Story by: Kazumasa Hayami
- Produced by: Takuro Nagai
- Starring: Satoshi Tsumabuki; Sosuke Ikematsu; Mieko Harada
- Cinematography: Junichi Fujisawa
- Edited by: Shinichi Fushima
- Music by: Takashi Watanabe
- Release date: 24 May 2014 (Japan)
- Running time: 117 minutes
- Country: Japan
- Language: Japanese

Our Family (Japanese: ぼくたちの家族, Hepburn: Bokutachi no Kazoku) is a 2014 Japanese drama film directed by Yuya Ishii.

== Cast ==
- Satoshi Tsumabuki - Kosuke Wakana
- Sosuke Ikematsu - Kousuke Wakana
- Mieko Harada - Reiko Wakana
- Kyōzō Nagatsuka - Katsuaki Wakana
