= Satoshi Murayama =

Japanese shogi player (1969–1998)

- Native name: 村山聖
- Born: June 15, 1969
- Hometown: Fuchū town, Hiroshima
- Nationality: Japanese
- Died: August 8, 1998 (aged 29)

Career
- Achieved professional status: November 5, 1986 (aged 17)
- Badge Number: 180
- Rank: 9 dan
- Retired: August 9, 1998 (aged 29)
- Teacher: Nobuo Mori (7 dan)
- Career record: 356–201 (.639)

Satoshi Murayama (村山 聖, Murayama Satoshi; June 15, 1969 – August 8, 1998) was a Japanese professional shogi player who achieved the rank of 9-dan.

== Life ==
As a child, he spent much of his time hospitalized due to nephrotic syndrome. He later acquired bladder cancer but focused on shogi rather than getting treatment.

== Representation in media ==
The movie Satoshi: A Move for Tomorrow was based on Murayama's life as a shogi professional.

Nikaidō Harunobu from the manga series March Comes in like a Lion is a character modeled after Murayama.
