= Bunshun Kiichigo Awards =

2005–2008 Japanese satirical award

- Awarded for: Worst in Film
- Country: Japan
- Presented by: Bungeishunjū, Ltd.
- First award: January 24, 2005
- Final award: February 28, 2008

The Bunshun Kiichigo Awards (文春きいちご賞 - Bunshun Kiichigo Shou), or Bunshun Raspberry Awards, was an award presented in recognition of the worst in film. It was founded in 2005 by the Japanese publication company Bungeishunjū, Ltd. Each year, up to 10 movies are nominated for the award (although in 2008 there were 11 nominees).

The first film to win 1st Place was Devilman (the live-action adaptation of Go Nagai's anime/manga series), which had already received negative reviews in Japan.

The Bunshun Kiichigo Awards are not limited strictly to domestic films; American and foreign films were selected as candidates as well. They include Thunderbirds (the live-action remake of Gerry Anderson's classic puppet show), the Hong Kong film 2046, War of the Worlds (the 2005 remake), and The Da Vinci Code.

== Worst Movie Awards ==
=== 2004 ===
- 1st Place: Devilman
- 2nd Place: Casshern
- 3rd Place: Umineko
- 4th Place: Howl's Moving Castle
- 5th Place: The Village
- 6th Place: Godzilla: Final Wars
- 7th Place: Thunderbirds
- 8th Place (Tied): 2046
- 8th Place (Tied): Cutie Honey
- 8th Place (Tied): The Chronicles of Riddick

=== 2005 ===
- 1st Place: Shinobi: Heart Under Blade
- 2nd Place: Takeshis'
- 3rd Place: War of the Worlds
- 4th Place: Sengoku Jieitai 1549
- 5th Place: Princess Raccoon
- 6th Place (Tied): Spring Snow
- 6th Place (Tied): Alexander
- 6th Place (Tied): Kita no Zero-Nen
- 9th Place (Tied): Tonbi ga Kururito
- 9th Place (Tied): Tokyo Tower

=== 2006 ===
- 1st Place: Tales from Earthsea
- 2nd Place: Sinking of Japan
- 3rd Place: The Da Vinci Code
- 4th Place: Nada Sōsō
- 5th Place: The Promise
- 6th Place: Limit of Love: Umizaru
- 7th Place: Yeonriji
- 8th Place: Rough
- 9th Place: Angel-A
- 10th Place: Christmas on July 24th Avenue

=== 2007 ===
- 1st Place: Genghis Khan: To the Ends of the Earth and Sea
- 2nd Place: Koizora
- 3rd Place: Last Love
- 4th Place: Ai no Rukeichi
- 5th Place: Glory to the Filmmaker!
- 6th Place: Dororo
- 7th Place: Saiyuki
- 8th Place (Tied): Ore wa, Kimi no Tame ni Koso Shini ni Iku
- 8th Place (Tied): Hero
- 10th Place (Tied): Inland Empire
- 10th Place (Tied): The Mourning Forest
