= The Asadas =

2020 Japanese film

- Theatrical release poster
- Directed by: Ryōta Nakano
- Written by: Ryōta Nakano; Tomoe Kanno
- Based on: Asada-ke and Album no Chikara by Masashi Asada
- Starring: Kazunari Ninomiya; Haru Kuroki; Masaki Suda; Jun Fubuki; Mitsuru Hirata; Satoshi Tsumabuki
- Cinematography: Hironori Yamazaki
- Edited by: Sōichi Ueno
- Music by: Takashi Watanabe
- Production companies: Toho Pictures, Bridgehead, Pipeline
- Distributed by: Toho
- Release date: October 2, 2020 (Japan)
- Running time: 127 minutes
- Country: Japan
- Language: Japanese
- Box office: ¥1.21 billion

The Asadas (Japanese: 浅田家!) is a 2020 Japanese biographical drama film written by Ryōta Nakano and Tomoe Kanno and directed by Nakano. The film was part of the official selection for the Warsaw Film Festival and the 26th Busan International Film Festival.

== Plot ==
Masashi Asada is the gifted but irresponsible youngest son in a family, and a photographer. His work initially revolves around taking staged photos of his family, depicting an ideal world where they do their dream jobs. Asada publishes his book, which has mediocre sales, and turns to his childhood crush for support. As his book starts to take off, he starts getting requests from average families for him to take photos of them. When the 2011 Tōhoku earthquake happens, he volunteers to help cleaning and sorting out photographs from the victims' families. As part of this, he does some soul searching and realises the value of family. The main character is based on the real-life photographer, Masashi Asada.

== Production ==
Filming took place in 2020, and it was distributed by Bridgehard in Europe and Toho Studios in the rest of the world.

== Cast ==
- Kazunari Ninomiya as Masashi Asada
- Satoshi Tsumabuki as Yukihiro Asada
- Haru Kuroki as Wakana Kawakami
- Masaki Suda as Yōsuke Ono
- Jun Fubuki as Junko Asada
- Mitsuru Hirata as Akira Asada
- Makiko Watanabe
- Yukiya Kitamura as Kenzō Shibukawa
- Maho Nonami
- Tarō Suruga
- Nobue Iketani
- Ryūto Iwata as young Masashi Asada
- Tsubasa Nakagawa as young Yukihiro Asada
