= Satoshi: A Move for Tomorrow =

- Theatrical release poster
- Directed by: Yoshitaka Mori
- Screenplay by: Kōsuke Mukai
- Based on: Satoshi no Seishun by Yoshio Ōsaki
- Starring: Kenichi Matsuyama; Masahiro Higashide; Shōta Sometani; Ken Yasuda; Michitaka Tsutsui; Keiko Takeshita; Lily Franky
- Cinematography: Katsumi Yanagishima
- Edited by: Takashi Satō
- Music by: Yoshihiro Hanno
- Distributed by: Kadokawa
- Release date: November 19, 2016 (Japan)
- Running time: 124 minutes
- Country: Japan
- Language: Japanese

Satoshi: A Move for Tomorrow (Japanese: 聖の青春, Hepburn: Satoshi no Seishun) is a 2016 Japanese drama film directed by Yoshitaka Mori, starring Kenichi Matsuyama and based on the novel of the same name by Yoshio Ōsaki. By the first screenings, the film had earned ¥72 million (US$0.662 million).

== Plot ==
The film portrays the life of Satoshi Murayama (1969–1998), who was a professional shogi player.

== Cast ==
- Kenichi Matsuyama as Satoshi Murayama
- Masahiro Higashide as Yoshiharu Habu, Satoshi's rival and one of the greatest shogi players of all time.
- Lily Franky as Nobuo Mori, Satoshi's master
- Keiko Takeshita as Tomiko Murayama, Satoshi's mother
- Shōta Sometani as Mitsugu Egawa
- Ken Yasuda as Seiichiro Tachibana (based on Seiichiro Taki)
- Tokio Emoto as Manabu Arazaki (based on Manabu Senzaki)
- Toshiyuki Kitami as Shinichi Murayama, Satoshi's father
- Shingo Tsurumi as a doctor
- Michitaka Tsutsui as Yōji Hashiguchi (based on Yoshio Ōsaki)

== Awards ==
Award ceremony	Category	Recipients	Result
59th Blue Ribbon Awards	Best Actor	Kenichi Matsuyama	Won
59th Blue Ribbon Awards	Best Supporting Actor	Lily Franky	Won
41st Hochi Film Award	Best Actor	Kenichi Matsuyama	Nominated
41st Hochi Film Award	Best Supporting Actor	Masahiro Higashide	Nominated
41st Hochi Film Award	Best Supporting Actor	Lily Franky	Nominated
31st Takasaki Film Festival	Best Director	Yoshitaka Mori	Won
71st Mainichi Film Awards	Best Actor	Kenichi Matsuyama	Nominated
71st Mainichi Film Awards	Best Supporting Actor	Masahiro Higashide	Nominated
71st Mainichi Film Awards	Best Screenplay	Kōsuke Mukai	Won
71st Mainichi Film Awards	Best Sound Recording	Mitsugu Shiratori	Won
12th Osaka Cinema Festival	Best Actor	Kenichi Matsuyama	Won
12th Osaka Cinema Festival	Best Supporting Actor	Masahiro Higashide	Won
40th Japan Academy Prize	Best Actor	Kenichi Matsuyama	Nominated
40th Japan Academy Prize	Best Supporting Actor	Masahiro Higashide	Nominated
26th Japanese Movie Critics Awards	Best Supporting Actor	Masahiro Higashide	Won
