= Her Love Boils Bathwater =

- Film poster
- Directed by: Ryōta Nakano
- Screenplay by: Ryōta Nakano
- Produced by: Kazumi Fukase; Yusuke Wakabayashi
- Starring: Rie Miyazawa; Hana Sugisaki; Joe Odagiri
- Cinematography: Yoshihiro Ikeuchi
- Edited by: Masahide Kōra
- Music by: Takashi Watanabe
- Distributed by: KlockWorx
- Release date: October 29, 2016 (Japan)
- Running time: 125 minutes
- Country: Japan
- Language: Japanese
- Box office: ¥300,000,000 approx. domestic, US$168,279 international

Her Love Boils Bathwater (Japanese: 湯を沸かすほどの熱い愛, Hepburn: Yu o Wakasu Hodo no Atsui Ai) is a 2016 Japanese drama film directed by Ryōta Nakano. It was selected as the Japanese entry for the Best Foreign Language Film at the 90th Academy Awards, but it was not nominated.

== Plot ==
Futaba (Rie Miyazawa) single-handedly raising her teenage daughter Azumi (Hana Sugisaki) who is unpopular and bullied at school. One day, she collapses at work, and after going to the hospital, is diagnosed with terminal cancer and learns she only has a few months to live. She decides to use her last few months to improve the life of her family.

First, she hires a private investigator (Tarō Suruga) to track down her husband, Kazuhiro (Joe Odagiri), who had left her for another woman. The other woman had in turn abandoned him, leaving him to look after a 9-year old daughter Ayuko (Aoi Itō) who she claimed was the result of a one-night stand years before. Kazuhiro agrees to come back and live with them, following an awkward reunion with Azumi, who is still hurt by his leaving. Together, Futaba, Kazuhiro and the two girls reopen the family bathhouse, which will provide them with a comfortable life.

Meanwhile, Azumi's school uniform is stolen by another student during gym class, where she is embarrassed in front of the whole class. She refuses to go to school the following day until her mother convinces her that she needs to stand up for herself. She returns to school in her gym clothes, gets ridiculed, and then strips to her underwear and demands her uniform back from whoever stole it. After throwing up from nervousness, she is with the school nurse when the uniform gets returned to her. Ayuko, remembering the words of her mother that abandoned her, runs away from home to try and meet her mother on her birthday. Futaba deduces where she must have gone, and goes with Azumi to find her waiting in the cold. The next morning, they celebrate her birthday with shabu shabu.

As family life improves, Futaba and the girls embark on a road trip for vacation. They encounter Takumi (Tori Matsuzaka), a young man who says he is hitchhiking from Hokkaido. Futaba doubts this explanation, and he confides that he is running away from his rich but unloving family. Futaba insults him for wasting the time and resources that he has in life, and he decides to leave them at the next rest stop. Unsure of where to go, she suggests that he finally travel to Hokkaido, so that at least he is seen it. He requests to see her and the family again, which she agrees.

Futaba and the girls finally reach a coastal town near Mount Fuji to eat spider crab. In the restaurant there is a deaf woman working, who is revealed to be the biological mother of Azumi, Kimie Sakamaki (Yukiko Shinohara), who gave birth to Azumi when she was only 19. Futaba forces Azumi to introduce herself to Kimie, who is confused why she knows sign language. Azumi explains that she was forced to learn sign language by Futaba, who had anticipated this reunion.

After picking up Azumi, Futaba collapses, and is then hospitalized. The private investigator from earlier approaches one day to say that he finally tracked down her own mother, who had left her many years ago. She begs him to take her to Tokyo to see her. Upon arriving at the house, her mother denies the story. Futaba, seeing the old woman inside with her other daughter and granddaughter, gets frustrated and shatters a window and they flee.

Takumi returns from the north to visit them, and begins working at the bath house. Kimie visits Azumi the same day, and the five of them go to visit Futaba in the hospital at night, to promise that they will keep everything together once she passes away.

== Cast ==
- Rie Miyazawa as Futaba Sachino
- Hana Sugisaki as Azumi Sachino
- Joe Odagiri as Kazuhiro Sachino
- Tori Matsuzaka as Takumi Mukai
- Aoi Itō as Ayuko Katase
- Yukiko Shinohara as Kimie Sakamaki
- Tarō Suruga as Takimoto

== Reception ==
=== Critical response ===
Her Love Boils Bathwater has an approval rating of 100% on review aggregator website Rotten Tomatoes, based on 5 reviews, and an average rating of 8/10.

=== Awards and nominations ===
| Award ceremony | Category | Recipients | Result |
|---|---|---|---|
| 41st Hochi Film Award | Best Picture | Her Love Boils Bathwater | Won |
| 41st Hochi Film Award | Best Actress | Rie Miyazawa | Won |
| 41st Hochi Film Award | Best Supporting Actress | Hana Sugisaki | Won |
| 41st Hochi Film Award | Best New Artist | Ryōta Nakano | Won |
| 29th Nikkan Sports Film Award | Best Actress | Rie Miyazawa | Won |
| 59th Blue Ribbon Awards | Best Supporting Actress | Hana Sugisaki | Won |
| 40th Japan Academy Prize | Picture of the Year | Her Love Boils Bathwater | Nominated |
| 40th Japan Academy Prize | Director of the Year | Ryōta Nakano | Nominated |
| 40th Japan Academy Prize | Screenplay of the Year | Ryōta Nakano | Nominated |
| 40th Japan Academy Prize | Best Actress | Rie Miyazawa | Won |
| 40th Japan Academy Prize | Best Supporting Actress | Hana Sugisaki | Won |
| 40th Japan Academy Prize | Newcomer of the Year | Hana Sugisaki | Won |
| 26th Japanese Movie Critics Awards | Best Picture | Her Love Boils Bathwater | Won |
| 26th Japanese Movie Critics Awards | Best Director | Ryōta Nakano | Won |
| 26th Japanese Movie Critics Awards | Best Actress | Rie Miyazawa | Won |
| 26th Japanese Movie Critics Awards | Best Supporting Actress | Hana Sugisaki | Won |

== See also ==
- Cinema of Japan
- List of submissions to the 90th Academy Awards for Best Foreign Language Film
- List of Japanese submissions for the Academy Award for Best Foreign Language Film
