= The Magnificent Nine =

- Poster

Japanese name
- Kanji: 殿、利息でござる！
Transcriptions
- Revised Hepburn: Tono, Risoku de Gozaru!
- Directed by: Yoshihiro Nakamura
- Written by: Yoshihiro Nakamura; Kenichi Suzuki
- Story by: Michifumi Isoda
- Produced by: Fumitsugu Ikeda
- Starring: Sadao Abe; Eita; Satoshi Tsumabuki; Yūko Takeuchi; Yasufumi Terawaki; Masahiko Nishimura; Daiki Shigeoka; Ryuhei Matsuda; Mitsuko Kusabue; Tsutomu Yamazaki
- Narrated by: Gaku Hamada
- Cinematography: Yukihiro Okimura
- Edited by: Isao Kawase
- Music by: Goro Yasukawa; RC Succession's "Sukiyaki"
- Distributed by: Shochiku
- Release date: May 14, 2016 (Japan)
- Running time: 129 minutes
- Country: Japan
- Language: Japanese
- Box office: ¥611.3 million

The Magnificent Nine (Japanese: 殿、利息でござる！, Hepburn: Tono, Risoku de Gozaru!) is a 2016 Japanese jidaigeki samurai comedy film directed by Yoshihiro Nakamura. It was released in Japan by Shochiku on May 14, 2016.

The original story is Jusaburō Kokudaya (ja:穀田屋十三郎, Kokudaya Jusaburō) collected by "Unsung Heroes of Old Japan" written by Michifumi Isoda (ja:磯田道史, Isoda Michifumi) , a record of the townspeople who saved the plight of the Shukuba town at Yoshioka-juku (ja:吉岡宿) in the Sendai Domain (Sendai city) in the 18th century "Kokuonki (国恩記)" Based on (written by Monk Zuishi Eishū (栄洲瑞芝, Eishū Zuishi)).

This movie's catch phrase is "Zeni to Atama ha Tsukaiyou". (ゼニと頭は、使いよう。; Let's use Money and Brain. (Financial schemes and Wisdom require good handling.)).

== Plot ==
In 1766, residents in a town have a hard time due to the land tax and forced labor. Nine people, including Jusaburō Kokudaya (Sadao Abe), worry about the future of their town. They then set up a plan to save the town. The plan is to lend large amounts of money to Han (historical term for the estate of a warrior) and distribute the interest annually to the residents, but if they are caught, they will lose their lives.

== Cast ==
Kokudaya Family (Sake brewery)

- Sadao Abe
- Karen Iwata
- Daiki Shigeoka

Sugawaraya Family (Tea master)

- Eita
- Maika Yamamoto

Asanoya Family (Sake brewery and Money changer)

- Satoshi Tsumabuki
- Mitsuko Kusabue
- Tsutomu Yamazaki

Townspeople

- Yūko Takeuchi
- Yasufumi Terawaki
- Kitarō
- Yudai Chiba
- Ichirō Hashimoto
- Ken Nakamoto
- Masahiko Nishimura
- Keisuke Horibe
- Yuzuru Hanyu as Date Shigemura
- Ryuhei Matsuda

== Reception ==
On its opening weekend at the Japanese box office, the film was second placed, with 159,690 admissions and ¥194.9 million in gross. On its second weekend, it was again second placed by admissions, with 109,248, and was third placed by gross, with ¥135.2 million.

== Awards ==
Year	Award ceremony	Category	Result
2016	41st Hochi Film Award	Best Picture	Nominated

== See also ==
- Seven Samurai - directed by Akira Kurosawa (1954)
- The Magnificent Seven (1960)
- The Magnificent Seven (2016 film)
