= Museum (2016 film) =

2016 Japanese thriller film

- Theatrical release poster
- ミュージアム
- Directed by: Keishi Ōtomo
- Written by: Izumi Takahashi; Kiyomi Fujii; Keishi Ōtomo
- Based on: Museum by Ryosuke Tomoe
- Produced by: Atsuyuki Shimoda
- Starring: Shun Oguri; Machiko Ono; Shūhei Nomura; Tomomi Maruyama; Tomoko Tabata; Mikako Ichikawa; Masatō Ibu; Yutaka Matsushige; Nao Ōmori; Satoshi Tsumabuki
- Music by: Taro Iwashiro
- Production companies: GyaO; Iwamoto Metal Co.; KDDI; Kodansha; Nippon Broadcasting System; Parco Co. Ltd.; Tristone Entertainment Inc.; Twins Japan; Warner Bros. Pictures Japan; WOWOW Films
- Distributed by: Warner Bros. Pictures Japan
- Release date: November 12, 2016 (Japan)
- Running time: 132 minutes
- Country: Japan
- Language: Japanese
- Box office: $11,757,642

Museum (Japanese: ミュージアム, Hepburn: Myūjiamu) is a 2016 Japanese crime horror thriller film co-written and directed by Keishi Ōtomo and based on the 2013 manga of the same name by Ryosuke Tomoe. It was released in Japan by Warner Bros. Pictures on November 12, 2016.

== Plot ==
Recently divorced and miserable Detective Hisashi Sawamura (Shun Oguri) and his naive rookie partner Nishino (Shuhei Nomura) search for a Tokyo serial killer named Sanae Kirishima (Satoshi Tsumabuki), who wears a cartoonish giant frog costume.

== Cast ==
- Shun Oguri as Detective Hisashi Sawamura
- Satoshi Tsumabuki as Sanae Kirishima, the serial killer who wears a cartoonish frog costume
- Machiko Ono as Haruka Sawamura
- Shūhei Nomura as Junichi Nishino
- Tomomi Maruyama as Tsuyoshi Sugawara
- Tomoko Tabata as Kayo Akiyama
- Mikako Ichikawa as Mikie Tachibana
- Masatō Ibu as Toshio Okabe
- Yutaka Matsushige as Kozo Sekihata
- Nao Ōmori as Hisashi's father
