= Ryōta Nakano =

Japanese film director (born 1973)

Ryota Nakano is a Japanese film director known for his films Her Love Boils Bathwater (2016), A Long Goodbye (2019), and The Asadas (2020).

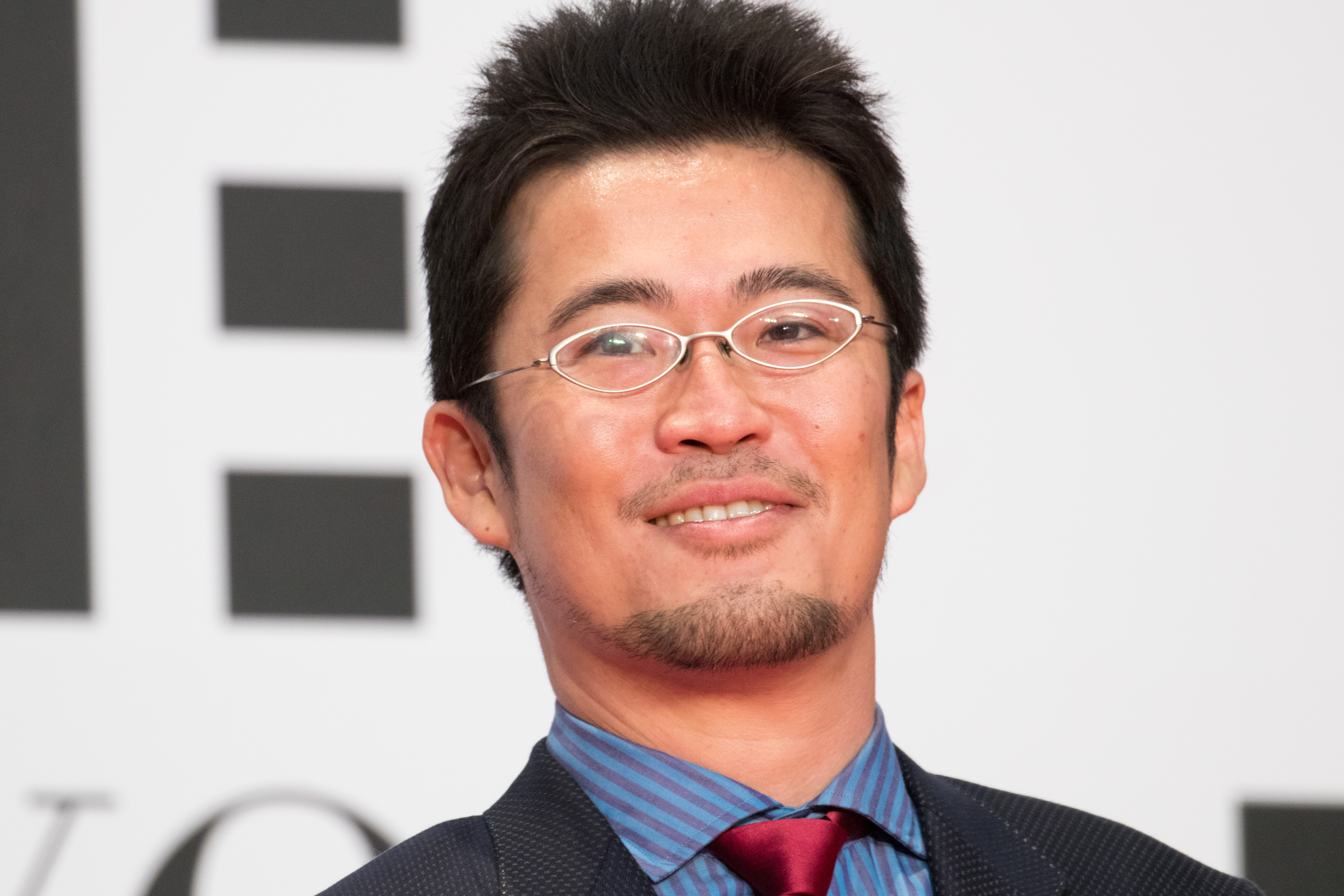
Nakano in 2016

== Early life and education ==
Nakano was born in 1973 and grew up in Kyoto. Nakano's father died when he was six and he was brought up by his mother. After leaving university, he decided to be a filmmaker. He then went to he studied at the Japan Film School. As a student Nakano travelled to India to make a student film, which would later be an influence on his film Her Love Boils Bathwater (2016). His graduation project was As We Go Cheering Our Flaming Lives.

== Career ==
Upon leaving film school, Nakano started off as an assistant director but decided he was no good at it after being fired from his position in the middle of a shoot. After that, he dropped out of the industry for a while. Upon returning to directing work, he started off working on minor televisions shows, before deciding to try directing films. He went into heavy debt to finance Capturing Dad, which was made in 2012. The film won awards and critical praise in Japan, which encouraged him to stick with the industry.

Nakano's next film, Her Love Boils Bathwater in 2016, won critical acclaim both in Japan and abroad. Since then, his films have regularly been selected for multiple film festivals around the world, and received acclaim.

== Artistry ==
Nakano's films often center around death or impending death and its effect on people. In particular, his films focus on the family unit and challenges to it.

== Accolades ==
Nakano was the recipient of an award at the Tama New Wave Grand Prix and the Japan Film School's Imamura Award, early in his career. He won Best Director Award at the SKIP City International D-Cinema Festival in 2012. Upon release of Her Love Boils Bathwater, Nakano received several nominations at the Japan Academy Film Prizes, including Best Picture of the Year, Director of the Year and Best Screenplay.

== Filmography ==
- As We Go Cheering Our Flaming Lives (2000)
- Rocket Punch (2006) (short)
- Capturing Dad (2012)
- Her Love Boils Bathwater (2016)
- A Long Goodbye (2019)
- The Asadas (2020)
- Bring Him Down to a Portable Size (2025)
- I Don't Know You (2026)
