= Rage (2016 film) =

- Poster
- Directed by: Sang-il Lee
- Written by: Sang-il Lee
- Based on: Rage; 2014 novel by Shuichi Yoshida
- Produced by: Akihiro Yamauchi; Genki Kawamura
- Starring: Ken Watanabe; Mirai Moriyama; Kenichi Matsuyama; Gō Ayano; Suzu Hirose; Pierre Taki; Mitsuki Takahata; Chizuru Ikewaki; Aoi Miyazaki; Satoshi Tsumabuki
- Cinematography: Norimichi Kasamatsu
- Edited by: Tsuyoshi Imai
- Music by: Ryuichi Sakamoto; Yoshikatsu Ikeuchi
- Production company: Toho
- Distributed by: Toho
- Release date: September 17, 2016 (Japan)
- Running time: 142 minutes
- Country: Japan
- Language: Japanese
- Box office: US$13.5 million

Rage (Japanese: 怒り, Hepburn: Ikari) is a Japanese suspense mystery drama film directed by Sang-il Lee, based on Shuichi Yoshida's mystery novel of the same name. It was released in Japan on September 17, 2016.

== Plot ==
The movie has three separate stories that are connected through a murder that takes place at the beginning in a suburban neighborhood in Tokyo. A mysterious man, whose face we never see, brutally murders a married couple in their home and paints the word “rage” on the door with their blood. Detectives Kunihisa Nanjō (Pierre Taki) and Sōsuke Kitami (Takahiro Miura) investigate the double homicide and discover that the perpetrator has gone through plastic surgery to escape the authorities. Then, we are shown the lives of three young men living in different parts of modern-Japan who might be the murderer.

In Chiba, a reclusive newcomer Tashiro Tetsuya (Matsuyama Kenichi) arrives in town and befriends Aiko (Miyazaki Aoi), a problematic young woman who was working in a brothel for a few months. She had only recently returned to her hometown after her father, Maki Yohei (Watanabe Ken) following an incident with a customer that left her traumatized. Tetsuya is the only person in town who can accept Aiko despite her dark past and Maki blesses their relationship. However, he begins to suspect that Tetsuya is not who he says he is after realizing that he is lying about his past. Aiko then reveals that Tetsuya is actually on the run from the Yakuza who are after him for not paying his dead father's unpaid debts. However, Aiko herself starts to suspect Tetsuya is not telling the truth after realizing that he looks strikingly similar to one of the sketches of the murderer.

The second story revolves around Onishi Naoto (Ayano Go), who hides out at a gay bathhouse in Tokyo to avoid people. One night, he is approached by Fujita Yuma (Tsumabuki Satoshi), an openly gay man. Naoto resists Yuma at first, but Yuma holds Naoto down and they have rough sex. Then, Yuma takes Naoto out for dinner and learns that he does not have a place to stay. Yuma offers to let him stay with him until Naoto finds a permanent place and they both become housemates. They slowly fall in love and Yuma even introduces Naoto to his sick mother and his other gay friends. When Yuma's mother dies, Naoto comforts him and they become even closer. However, Yuma sees Naoto with an unknown girl at a cafe one day. Yuma also starts to realize that Naoto resembles another one of the police sketches of the murderer. When Yuma confronts Naoto about this, he does not give a direct answer and instead leaves their apartment the following morning.

The third story is about Tanaka Shingo (Moriyama Mirai), a free-spirited homeless young man who lives alone on an abandoned island near Okinawa. One day, a teenage girl, Suzuya Izumi (Hirose Suzu), moves into the town with her single mother. She makes friends with a local boy, Chinen Tatsuya (Takara Sakumoto), who has feelings for her. One day, while exploring the island, Izumi meet Shingo and they strike a friendship. One night, the three accidentally meet in Naha. Tatsuya, who gets drunk, is momentarily separated from Izumi, who tries to search for him. Instead, she gets brutally raped by two American soldiers from the nearby army base. Tatsuya sees this but is too scared to fight off the soldiers. After the soldiers leave, Izumi makes Tatsuya promise to not tell anyone what had just happened.

Meanwhile, in Chiba, Aiko starts to fear for her life and eventually calls the police, but not before tipping off Tetsuya. Tetsuya runs away before the detectives arrive to test his fingerprints. The forensic tests reveal that he is not the murderer. Aiko becomes unstable again as she fears she has lost the one man who would ever love her forever. However, Tetsuya calls her one last time and Maki manages to convince him to come home. Although Tetsuya is now happily reunited with Aiko, Maki has to live in fear for the rest of his life that his daughter's life will forever be in danger because of Tetsuya's dark past. At the same time, Yuma meets the girl Naoto was talking to at the café. However, as it turns out, Naoto and the girl had both grown up in the same facility for orphans with health issues making her the closest thing to family he has. She also reveals to Yuma that Naoto had been living in the closet his entire life and that he'd fell in love with him because of his confidence and courage, however, he became heartbroken after Yuma starts questioning about his past. It's then revealed that after he left their apartment, Naoto had died of a heart attack shortly afterward.

In Okinawa, Tatsuya arranges for Shingo to work at his family's hotel. Later, Shingo reveals to Tatsuya that he in fact witnessed the rape himself but like him was also too scared to take any actions. One night, they both reveal to each other that they both saw Izumi being raped by the Americans but were both too scared to do anything. One evening, Shingo suffers from a sudden fit of rage and escaped back to the island. The following morning, Tatsuya goes to meet him there and finds the word "rage" scratched onto the wall, although he does not know what it means. In the end, Shingo confesses that he actually saw the Americans ogling Izumi and shadowed them as they followed her. However, he did nothing to warn her because he wanted to see her raped; this bombshell causes Tatsuya to suffer a mental breakdown, violently stabbing Shingo in the stomach before calling the police.

== Cast ==
Chiba

- Ken Watanabe as Yōhei Maki
- Kenichi Matsuyama as Tetsuya Tashiro
- Aoi Miyazaki as Aiko Maki
- Chizuru Ikewaki as Asuka

Tokyo

- Satoshi Tsumabuki as Yūma Fujita
- Gō Ayano as Naoto Ōnishi
- Mitsuki Takahata as Kaoru
- Hideko Hara as Takako Fujita

Okinawa

- Mirai Moriyama as Shingo Tanaka
- Suzu Hirose as Izumi Komiyama
- Takara Sakumoto as Tatsuya Chinen

Detectives

- Pierre Taki as Kunihisa Nanjō
- Miura as Sōsuke Kitami

== Reception ==
On its opening weekend in Japan, the film was third placed by admissions, with 170,000, and fourth placed by gross, with US$2.28 million.

== Awards and nominations ==
Award ceremony	Category	Recipients	Result
41st Hochi Film Award	Best Picture	Rage	Nominated
41st Hochi Film Award	Best Director	Sang-il Lee	Won
41st Hochi Film Award	Best Actor	Ken Watanabe	Nominated
41st Hochi Film Award	Best Supporting Actor	Gō Ayano	Won
41st Hochi Film Award	Best Supporting Actor	Satoshi Tsumabuki	Nominated
41st Hochi Film Award	Best Supporting Actor	Mirai Moriyama	Nominated
41st Hochi Film Award	Best Supporting Actress	Aoi Miyazaki	Nominated
41st Hochi Film Award	Best Supporting Actress	Suzu Hirose	Nominated
41st Hochi Film Award	Best New Artist	Takara Sakumoto	Nominated
29th Nikkan Sports Film Award	Best Film	Rage	Nominated
29th Nikkan Sports Film Award	Best Director	Sang-il Lee	Nominated
29th Nikkan Sports Film Award	Best Actor	Ken Watanabe	Nominated
29th Nikkan Sports Film Award	Best Supporting Actor	Satoshi Tsumabuki	Won
29th Nikkan Sports Film Award	Best Supporting Actor	Gō Ayano	Nominated
29th Nikkan Sports Film Award	Best Supporting Actress	Aoi Miyazaki	Won
29th Nikkan Sports Film Award	Best Supporting Actress	Suzu Hirose	Nominated
29th Nikkan Sports Film Award	Best Newcomer	Takara Sakumoto	Nominated
71st Mainichi Film Awards	Best Film	Rage	Nominated
71st Mainichi Film Awards	Best Director	Sang-il Lee	Nominated
71st Mainichi Film Awards	Best Supporting Actor	Satoshi Tsumabuki	Nominated
71st Mainichi Film Awards	Best Supporting Actress	Aoi Miyazaki	Nominated
11th Asian Film Awards	Best Supporting Actor	Gō Ayano	Nominated
11th Asian Film Awards	Best Newcomer	Takara Sakumoto	Nominated
11th Asian Film Awards	Best Composer	Ryuichi Sakamoto	Nominated
11th Asian Film Awards	Best Editor	Tsuyoshi Imai	Nominated
40th Japan Academy Prize	Picture of the Year	Rage	Nominated
40th Japan Academy Prize	Director of the Year	Sang-il Lee	Nominated
40th Japan Academy Prize	Screenplay of the Year	Sang-il Lee	Nominated
40th Japan Academy Prize	Best Actress	Aoi Miyazaki	Nominated
40th Japan Academy Prize	Best Supporting Actor	Satoshi Tsumabuki	Won
40th Japan Academy Prize	Best Supporting Actor	Mirai Moriyama	Nominated
40th Japan Academy Prize	Best Supporting Actress	Suzu Hirose	Nominated
40th Japan Academy Prize	Best Newcomer	Takara Sakumoto	Won
40th Japan Academy Prize	Best Cinematography	Norimichi Kasamatsu	Nominated
40th Japan Academy Prize	Best Art Direction	Yuji Tsuzuki and Fumiko Sakahara	Nominated
40th Japan Academy Prize	Best Lighting Direction	Yuuki Nakamura	Nominated
40th Japan Academy Prize	Best Sound Recording	Mitsugu Shiratori	Nominated
40th Japan Academy Prize	Best Film Editing	Tsuyoshi Imai	Nominated
26th Tokyo Sports Film Award	Best Supporting Actor	Gō Ayano	Won
26th Tokyo Sports Film Award	Best Supporting Actress	Suzu Hirose	Won
