= General Rouge no Gaisen =

Japanese television series

General Rouge no Gaisen (ジェネラル・ルージュの凱旋, The Triumphant Return of General Rouge) is a 12-episode Japanese medical drama television series broadcast in 2010, a sequel to the series Team Batista no Eikō. Atsushi Itō and Tōru Nakamura reprised their lead roles.

The initial season of Team Batista aired on Fuji TV in late 2008 and pulled in strong ratings, leading to a follow-up last October in the special episode "Nightingale no Chinmoku." The dramas were based on the first two novels in a best-selling medical mystery series by writer Takeru Kaido. The new season is based on the third novel, General Rouge no Gaisen. Both Team Batista no Eiko and General Rouge no Gaisen have also been adapted as feature films, starring Yūko Takeuchi and Hiroshi Abe. Fuji TV will broadcast Team Batista 2: General Rouge no Gaisen on Tuesdays at 10:00pm, beginning on April 6. New cast members this time include Hidetoshi Nishijima, Ai Kato and Miho Shiraishi.

== TV Show ==
General Rouge no Gaisen
- Also known as: Team Batista 2 General Rouge no Gaisen
- Genre: Medical Drama, Mystery
- Starring: Atsushi Itō; Tōru Nakamura; Hidetoshi Nishijima
- Ending theme: Ikutsu no Yoake wo Kazoetara (Seiko Matsuda)
- Original language: Japanese
- No. of episodes: 12

Production
- Producers: Yoko Toyofuku; Kōichi Toda; Kaoru Yamaki; Yasuhiro Mase; Kanjiro Sakura; Takeshi Sato; Takao Tsujii; Akihiro Yamauchi
- Production location: Tokyo
- Running time: 54 min./episode

Original release
- Network: Fuji TV
- Release: April 6 – June 22, 2010

Related
- Team Batista no Eikō; Team Batista SP ~Nightingale no Chinmoku

=== Cast ===
- Atsushi Itō – Kōhei Taguchi (29)
- Tōru Nakamura – Keisuke Shiratori (43)
- Hidetoshi Nishijima – Koichi Hayami (42)
- Ai Kato – Haruka Izumi (29)
- Takayuki Kinoshita (TKO) – Shinji Sato (37)
- Reina Asami – Yayoi Kuriyama (25)
- Tori Matsuzaka – Hideki Takizawa (26)
- Osamu Adachi – Yasutomo Nagayama (25)
- Taro Takeuchi – Kasuhiko Asano (25)
- Keisuke Horibe – Eiji Sasaki
- Go Riju – Daisuke Mifune
- Shigeyuki Totsugi – Takashi Hasegawa (35)
- Miho Shiraishi – Miwa Hanabusa (35)
- Yuko Natori – Makoto Fujiwara
- Ryuzo Hayashi – Kenta Takashina
- Hirotaro Honda – Shida Koichiro

=== Guest ===
- Tomoko Tabata – Saki Sugiyama (ep1)
- Takashi Ito – Shimada Takashi (ep1)
- Yuri Mizutani – Miho Takayama (ep1)
- Rinako Matsuoka – Mishima Tisato (ep1)
- Mina Fujii – Aoki Eri (ep2)
- Yuta Kanai – Makoto Sugawara (ep2)
- Tetsu Watanabe – Yasushi Tsukada (ep3)
- Ritsuko Nemoto – Motoko Tsukada (ep3)
- Hirofumi Araki – Hiroyuki Tsukada (ep3)
- Taishi Nakagawa – Hiroyuki Tsukada (young) (ep3)
- Kyusaku Shimada – Kazuo Meguro (ep1-4)
- Leona Hirota – Mitsuko Meguro (ep1,4)
- Sayuri Iwata – Kanae Mayama (ep5)
- Yoko Moriguchi – Midori Mayama (ep5)
- Yumi Asō – Ayako Saitou (ep5,11)
- Dori Sakurada – Kento Yamazaki (ep6)
- Megumi Oji – Noriko Yamazaki (ep6)
- Ren Yagami – Satoshi Teshigawara (ep7)
- Haruka Suenaga – Risako Shimomura (ep7)
- Denden – Shouzo Terauchi (ep7-10)
- Kotono Shibuya – Yumiko Sakazaki (ep8-10)
- Takashi Yamanaka – Tsuyoshi Takeda (ep10-11)

=== Episode information ===
Episode	Title	Writer	Director	Original airdate	Ratings (Kanto)	Ratings (Kansai)
1	Faint (失神)	Noriko Goto	Kazuhisa Imai	Apr 6, 2010; 22.00 - 23.09	12.4	14.5
2	Hyperventilation (過呼吸)	Noriko Goto	Kazuhisa Imai	Apr 13, 2010; 22.15 - 23.09	14.5	17.2
3	Personality Transformation (人格変貌)	Akane Yamada	Hisashi Ueda	Apr 20, 2010; 22.00 - 22.54	14.7	15.3
4	Myocardial infarction (心筋梗塞)	Noriko Goto	Shiraki Keiichiro	Apr 27, 2010; 22.00 - 22.54	14.2	14.8
5	Pneumonia (肺炎)	Tomokazu Tokunaga	Kazunari Hoshino	May 4, 2010; 22.00 - 22.54	12.6	14.7
6	Aftermath (後遺症)	Noriko Goto	Kazuhisa Imai	May 11, 2010; 22.00 - 22.54	14.8	16.6
7	Poisoning (中毒)	Noriko Goto	Hisashi Ueda	May 18, 2010; 22.00 - 22.54	16.0	16.3
8	Sentence (宣告)	Noriko Goto	Kazuhisa Imai	May 25, 2010; 22.00 - 22.54	14.7	15.5
9	Medical malpractice (医療ミス)	Tanaka Shinichi	Kazunari Hoshino	June 1, 2010; 22.00 - 22.54	14.6	15.7
10	Focus (病巣)	Tomokazu Tokunaga	Hisashi Ueda	June 8, 2010; 22.00 - 22.54	13.8	15.3
11	Memory loss (記憶喪失)	Noriko Goto	Kazuhisa Imai	June 15, 2010; 22.00 - 22.54	15.6	15.1
12	Critical condition (危篤)	Noriko Goto	Kazuhisa Imai	June 22, 2010; 22.10 - 23.14	15.1	19.2
Viewership ratings: 14.4% (Kanto) & 15.9% (Kansai)
