= Samba de Amigo: Party Central =

2023 video game

- Game icon on the Nintendo Switch
- Developer: Sega
- Publisher: Sega
- Director: Daisuke Shimizu
- Producer: Shun Nakamura
- Designer: Mariko Kawase
- Programmer: Hajime Iwamoto
- Artist: Yoshinari Amaike
- Composers: Naofumi Hataya; Kenichi Tokoi; Takenobu Mitsuyoshi; Iona Takashima; Etsuko Shimada
- Engine: Unity
- Platforms: iOS; macOS; Nintendo Switch; tvOS; Meta Quest 2; Meta Quest Pro; Meta Quest 3
- Release: iOS, macOS, Nintendo Switch, tvOS; August 29, 2023; Meta Quest 2, Meta Quest Pro, Meta Quest 3; October 12, 2023
- Genre: Rhythm
- Modes: Single-player, multiplayer

Samba de Amigo: Party Central (Note: Japanese: サンバDEアミーゴ : パーティーセントラル, Hepburn: Sanba de amīgo: Pātīsentoraru) is a 2023 motion-based rhythm game developed and published by Sega. The game is a sequel to Samba de Amigo and was released on the Nintendo Switch on August 29, 2023. In Samba de Amigo: Party Central, players shake their controllers like a set of maracas on time with the shapes on screen. In contrast to its predecessor, the game has less focus on Latin music and more on popular music genres in general.

A virtual reality version for Meta Quest 2 and Meta Quest Pro titled Samba de Amigo: Virtual Party (Note: サンバDEアミーゴ：・バーチャルパーティー, Sanba de amīgo: Bācharu pātī) was released on October 12, 2023. It is the first full virtual reality game published by Sega. An Apple Arcade version, Samba de Amigo: Party-To-Go (Note: サンバDEアミーゴ：パーティー・トゥ・ゴー, Sanba de amīgo: Pātī to~u gō), was released on the same date as Party Central.

Samba de Amigo: Party Central received generally positive reviews, but received criticism for inconsistent motion controls.

== Gameplay ==
Main gameplay on the Nintendo Switch version

Similarly to its predecessor, the player is tasked with shaking their controllers, represented in-game by maracas, to different angles to the beat, being guided by the on-screen graphics. Six rings are arranged in a circle and balls come out from the center of the circle in Samba de Amigo: Party Central or far away in Virtual Party. The player must shake their controller to a ring's location when a ball reaches it. A line of arrows may also appear, reaching from one ring to another, and the player must move their controller along it. Occasionally, a stick figure appears and the player is told to copy its move, either static or moving, in order to gain extra points. When the player shakes to a multicolored ball with a question mark on it, a happening, such as "High-Fives", "Crazy Dash", "Home Run", and "Pose Rush", is randomly selected and either a minigame is switched to (the player has to complete it for a higher score) or the gameplay is temporarily altered. Button controls are also supported.

The player is represented by Amigo, who can be customised to wear different types of clothing purchased with in-game currency earned by completing songs and leveling up. The environment becomes more lively based on the player's performance.

=== Game modes ===
The standard mode allows the player to play any song at any difficulty level.

The "StreamiGo!" mode has Amigo trying to become a famous online streamer. The player must complete missions and defeat opponents to earn more followers. A simulated chat room for each character is displayed on-screen.

There are both competitive and co-op two-player modes. One of them is "Showdown", in which two players battle each other. Another of them is "Love Checker", in which two players play together to see how compatible they are based on their performance.

Four players can play together online. "World Party" is an eight-player online mode in which players, along with 12 computer-controlled ones, compete through three randomly-chosen songs to get obtain the highest score to avoid losing. Differing events occur and items can be used. At the end of each round, the losing players are eliminated.

Samba de Amigo: Party-To-Go has a story mode, the first in the series. In the story, Amigo seeks to "return lost music to the world".

== Development ==
Shun Nakamura, the game's director and producer, was the director of Samba de Amigo, the first work he directed, and wanted to create it again. He was also interested in virtual reality hardware and noticed a trend of reusing old intellectual properties in the video game industry. As a result, he proposed a revival of Samba de Amigo, feeling it was a suitable title for virtual reality. He and the development team aimed to adapt the game to present times while preserving its fundamentals and have it instill happiness in its players. The game was based on the concept of "silly fun", which was explained by Nakamura to TechRadar as prioritizing fun and enjoyment of music over skill, contrasted to typical rhythm games. The younger developers on the team had to be adjusted to the concept due to the difference and not being familiar with the fundamentals of Samba de Amigo. The game was greatly influenced by TikTok, reflecting on how users would entertain others with videos of themselves performing and enjoying music so that the game could correctly execute the "silly fun" concept for the present generation, with happenings being an example. The main gameplay had already been established, so not much inspiration was derived from other rhythm games.

Samba de Amigo, as an experimental game, used Western music that Japanese audiences knew as it was intended for the regional market. When Samba de Amigo reached international audiences, some players expressed interest in playing to Japanese music and music other than Latin music. This was put into consideration for choosing the soundtrack, which is supposed to appeal to the international market, as well as the standard that songs should be enjoyable in a way that the rhythms are dynamic. People including members of the development team and overseas staff and advisors were considered for the soundtrack. Sega's sound team created an original song for the game.

Meta Quest 2 was chosen as the platform for Samba de Amigo: Virtual Party to reach large audiences and for how dynamic the game was. Nakamura, who didn't have knowledge of virtual reality games, studied ones that were not of the music genre. The team encountered many difficulties, such as timing for scoring balls flying towards the player, distance of the balls when the player is posing, and distance of the screen from the player.

== Release ==
Samba de Amigo: Party Central was announced during the Nintendo Direct on February 8, 2023. Samba de Amigo: Virtual Party was announced during the 2023 Meta Quest Gaming Showcase on June 1, 2023. Samba de Amigo: Party-To-Go was announced on August 1, 2023. A demo for Party Central was released on August 15, 2023, prior to the game's launch.

There are nine downloadable content packs of songs that were released throughout the rest of 2023 after the Samba de Amigo: Party Central's launch, and more downloadable content to be released in 2024. The Digital Deluxe edition of Party Central, which contains the Sonic the Hedgehog Music Pack and Sega Music Pack of songs and costumes based on Sonic the Hedgehog, Miles "Tails" Prower, Space Channel 5, Super Monkey Ball, and Puyo Puyo, began selling on launch day. Players who pre-ordered Virtual Party received in-game cosmetics replicating the Quest 2 headset and Quest controllers. The Persona 5 Royal Dress-up Pack, which contains cosmetics related to the game, was released on October 26, 2023. The Kawaii Music Pack, released on November 29, 2023, includes the Love and Berry Fashion Set.

== Soundtrack ==
40 songs are included at launch with more to be added as downloadable content after launch.

Soundtrack to Samba de Amigo: Party Central
Song	Artist
"Azukita"	Steve Aoki and Play-N-Skillz featuring Daddy Yankee and Elvis Crespo
"Bang Bang"	Jessie J, Ariana Grande, and Nicki Minaj
"Bom Bom"	Sam and the Womp
"Break Free"	Ariana Grande featuring Zedd
"Celebrate"	Pitbull
"Centerfold"	The J. Geils Band
"Chosen Mask"	Sega
"The Cup of Life (Spanglish Version)"	Ricky Martin
"Escape from the City"	Sonic Adventure 2 (Note: Performed by Ted Poley and Tony Harnell)
"Fist Bump"	Sonic Forces (Note: Performed by Douglas Robb (Hoobastank))
"Fugue in G minor"	Cover (Note: Original by Johann Sebastian Bach; arrangement originally used in Rhythm Thief & the Emperor's Treasure, as “En Garde, Jean-François”, composed by Tomoya Ohtani)
"Get Busy"	Soolja
"Good Feeling"	Flo Rida
"Good Time"	Owl City and Carly Rae Jepsen
"I Love It"	Icona Pop featuring Charli XCX
"I Really Like You"	Carly Rae Jepsen
"I Will Survive (Eric Kupper Mix Edit)"	Gloria Gaynor (Note: Remix by Eric Kupper)
"I Won't Let You Down"	OK Go
"Just Dance"	Lady Gaga featuring Colby O'Donis
"Karma Chameleon"	Culture Club
"La Bamba"	Cover (Note: Original by Ritchie Valens)
"Let You Go"	Diplo and TSHA featuring Kareem Lomax
"Let's Find It and Shake It"	Sega
"Macarena"	Cover (Note: Original by Los del Río)
"Make Way"	Aloe Blacc
"Move Your Feet"	Junior Senior
"Moves like Jagger"	Maroon 5 featuring Christina Aguilera
"Pa'lla"	Max Pizzolante
"Panama"	Matteo
"Payback"	Cheat Codes featuring Icona Pop
"Plastic Hearts"	Miley Cyrus
"Pompeii"	Bastille
"Runaway (U & I)"	Galantis
"Scent of Your Sweet Love"	Sega
"Sucker"	Jonas Brothers
"Tik Tok" (Note: Available on the demo version of Samba de Amigo: Party Central)	Kesha
"Vamos a Carnaval"	Sega
"XS"	Rina Sawayama
"You & Me"	Marshmello
"You Give Love a Bad Name"	Bon Jovi

=== Samba de Amigo: Party-To-Go ===
The following songs are exclusive to Samba de Amigo: Party-To-Go.

Samba de Amigo: Party-To-Go tracks
Song	Artist
"Daddy"	Psy featuring CL
"The Edge of Glory"	Lady Gaga
"The Walker"	Fitz and the Tantrums

=== Downloadable content ===
==== Sonic the Hedgehog Music Pack ====
Released within the Digital Deluxe Edition and separately on Samba de Amigo: Party Central's launch date, this downloadable content pack contains songs from the Sonic the Hedgehog series.

Sonic the Hedgehog Music Pack tracks
Song	Source
"I'm Here"	Sonic Frontiers
"Open Your Heart"	Sonic Adventure
"Reach for the Stars (Re-Colors)"	Sonic Colors: Ultimate

==== Sega Music Pack ====
Released separately and included within the Digital Deluxe Edition on September 27, 2023, this downloadable content pack contains songs from other non-Sonic Sega games.

Sega Music Pack tracks
Song	Source
"Bakamitai (Taxi Driver Edition)" (Note: The original Japanese version is used.)	Like a Dragon franchise
"Go Go Cheer Girl!"	Space Channel 5: Part 2
"Theme of Phantom R"	Rhythm Thief & the Emperor's Treasure

==== Day one update ====
The following songs were added to the game as a free update on Samba de Amigo: Party Central's launch date.

Launch day bonus tracks for Samba de Amigo: Party Central
Song	Artist
"Let's Take a Shot"	Pitbull featuring Vikina
"Shake Señora" (Note: Available on the demo version of Samba de Amigo: Party Central)	Pitbull featuring T-Pain and Sean Paul

==== Japanese Music Pack ====
Released on Samba de Amigo: Party Central's launch date, this downloadable content pack contains Japanese songs.

Japanese Music Pack tracks
Song	Artist
"Kaikai Kitan"	Eve
"King"	Hatsune Miku (Note: Hatsune Miku is misattributed to, voice is of Gumi; composed by Kanaria.)
"Matsuken Samba II" (Note: The original Japanese version is used.)	Ken Matsudaira

==== K-Pop Music Pack ====
Released on September 27, 2023, this downloadable content pack contains K-pop songs.

K-Pop Music Pack tracks
Song	Artist
"Cupid (Twin Version) – Sped-Up"	Fifty Fifty
"Dynamite"	BTS
"Permission to Dance"	BTS

==== Phantom Thieves of Hearts Music Pack ====
Released on October 26, 2023, this downloadable content pack contains songs from Persona 5 and Persona 5 Royal.

Phantom Thieves of Hearts Music Pack tracks
Song	Source
"Colors Flying High"	Persona 5 Royal
"Life Will Change"	Persona 5
"Rivers In the Desert"	Persona 5

==== Virtual Singer Music Pack ====
Released on October 26, 2023, this downloadable content pack contains songs by virtual singers.

Virtual Singer Music Pack tracks
Song	Artist
"Goodbye Declaration"	flower (Note: Composed by Chinozo)
"Phony"	Kafu (Note: Composed by Tsumiki)
"The Vampire"	Hatsune Miku (Note: Composed by Deco*27)

==== Amigo's Favorites Music Pack ====
Released on November 29, 2023, this downloadable content pack contains versions of songs from the previous game Samba de Amigo.

Amigo's Favorites Music Pack tracks
Song	Artist
"Do It Well"	Jennifer Lopez
"Take On Me"	Weezer (Note: Original by a-ha)
"Tubthumping"	Chumbawamba

==== Party Music Pack ====
Released on November 29, 2023, this downloadable content pack contains remixes of holiday songs.

Amigo's Favorites Music Pack tracks
Song
"Happy Birthday -Cake and Candles Mix-"
"Happy Holidays -Jolly Party Mix-"
"Spicy Beach BBQ -Sizzling Mix-"
"World New Year -Funky Party Mix-"

==== Kawaii Music Pack ====
Released on November 29, 2023, this downloadable content pack contains songs with a "kawaii" tone.

Kawaii Music Pack tracks
Song	Artist
"ABC de Daijoubu!" (Note: The original Japanese version is used.)	Love and Berry (Note: Performed by Love (Hiromi Konno) and Berry (Hisayo Yanai))
"Idol"	Yoasobi
"Milky Star, Shooting Star"	Maimai DX (Note: Performed by Karasuyasubou featuring Rika)

== Reception ==
Reception

Aggregate score
Aggregator	Score
Metacritic	71/100

Review scores
Publication	Score
Destructoid	6/10
Digital Trends	3/5
Famitsu	32/40
Nintendo Life	6/10
Shacknews	8/10
TouchArcade	4/5; 4/5 (PTG)

Before the Samba de Amigo: Party Central's release, the demo version played by critics was received positively by them. Michael McWhertor of Polygon stated that "Sega has retained the soul of Samba de Amigo's colorful arcade antics with Party Central", but noted it lacked the tactile feedback of the original Dreamcast game that made it more immersive. On the other hand, Ruby Innes of Kotaku Australia praised the game's full usage of the Joy-Con's rumble mechanics, as well as cited the combination of motion-based rhythm gameplay and Samba de Amigo's art style as attractive. Giovanni Colantonio of Digital Trends found it appealing as a rhythm game targeted towards casual audiences, but also found the motion controls to be inconsistent sometimes and reminiscent of the Wii's problems with motion controls.

Samba de Amigo: Party Central received "mixed or average" reviews according to review aggregator website Metacritic. In Japan, four critics from Famitsu gave the game a total score of 32 out of 40, with each critic awarding the game an 8 out of 10. Destructoid gave the game a six out of ten, mentioning that the game "provides a thrilling rhythm-based challenge with a selection of decent songs [...] It's just a shame that the game's Latin-inspired routes take a backseat to a poppier soundtrack." The Gamer commented negatively on the game's music, claiming that "we're trading ‘Samba de Janeiro' for ‘Moves Like Jagger', and that's unforgivable." However, they remained positive about the inclusion of Sonic the Hedgehog, Space Channel 5: Part 2, and the K-pop downloadable content soundtracks.

== See also ==
- Taiko no Tatsujin: Drum 'n' Fun!
