= The Queen of Lunchtime Cuisine =

- Series DVD cover
- Genre: Romantic Comedy, Food
- Starring: Yūko Takeuchi; Yōsuke Eguchi; Satoshi Tsumabuki; Shinichi Tsutsumi
- Theme music composer: Ryo Yoshimata
- Opening theme: Flow
- Country of origin: Japan
- Original language: Japanese
- No. of episodes: 12 (list of episodes)

Production
- Producers: Masatoshi Yamaguchi; Yoshimasa Genouzono

Original release
- Network: Fuji TV
- Release: July 1 – September 16, 2002

The Queen of Lunchtime Cuisine (ランチの女王, Ranchi no Joō; lit. "Queen of Lunch") is a Japanese drama series aired in Japan on Fuji TV in 2002. It stars Yūko Takeuchi, Yōsuke Eguchi, Satoshi Tsumabuki, and Shinichi Tsutsumi.

== Synopsis ==
Season 1 (2002)

Natsumi loves lunchtime and food. Nothing excites her more than to walk down the street thinking about where she'll eat lunch. One day, a man named Kennichiro interrupts Natsumi as she's about to eat her favorite rice omelet and drags her outside and begs her to come home with him so that he can introduce her to his family. He explains to her that his father is sick and after leaving on bad terms, the only way he'll be allowed back home is to return with a fiancée. Natsumi is left with quite a predicament.

== Cast ==
Season 1 (2002)

=== Main ===
| Role | Actor |
|---|---|
| Natsumi Mugita | Yūko Takeuchi |
| Yujiro Nabeshima | Yōsuke Eguchi |
| Junzaburo Nabeshima | Satoshi Tsumabuki |
| Minoru Ushijima | Takayuki Yamada |
| Koshiro Nabeshima | Tomohisa Yamashita |
| Tomato Shiomi | Misaki Itoh |
| Kenzo Nabeshima | Go Wakabayashi |
| Kenichiro Nabeshima | Shinichi Tsutsumi |
| Shuuji (Natsumi-san's ex-lover) | Go Morita |
| Noboru Sakai | Eita |
| Mamoru Kawabata | Issei Takubo |
| Hidemi Yamashiro | Masako Umemiya |
| Yumi | Emi Suzuki |

=== Minor ===
| Role | Actor | Episode(s) acted in |
|---|---|---|
| | Ren Ohsugi | 1 & 12 |
| | Morooka | 3 & 4 |
| | Kohki Okada | 3 & 10 |
| | Kosuke Toyohara | 5 - 7 |
| Negi-ba | Teruko Hanabara | 5 & 8 |
| | Ken Ishiguro | 7 |
| | Yusuke Kamiji | 7 |
| Maggie | Kenta Kiritani | 8 |
| Nagisa Kirishima | Eriko Sato | 11 |
| | Shinshou Nakamaru | 12 |

== Episodes ==
=== Season One (2002) ===
| Ep# | Title | Original air date | Ratings (Kanto Region) |
|---|---|---|---|
| 01 | An omelette with rice which you love (恋するオムライス) | 01-07-2002 | 21.9% |
| 02 | Now Serving: The New Summer Love Menu! (登場！夏の恋の新メニュー) | 08-07-2002 | 18.5% |
| 03 | Cream Corokke... of Tears (涙…のクリーム・コロッケ) | 15-07-2002 | 19.7% |
| 04 | Check Out this Chicken & Rice Properly, Ok! (チキンライスをキチンとね) | 22-07-2002 | 18.8% |
| 05 | More, please! Puffy rice (おかわり！ふっくらごはん) | 29-07-2002 | 18.5% |
| 06 | Father's Last Children's Lunch (Dad's Last Happy Meal) (親父の最後のお子様ランチ) | 05-08-2002 | 17.0% |
| 07 | A hamburger steak! An old lover!! (ハンバーグ！昔の恋人!!) | 12-08-2002 | 17.0% |
| 08 | A cutlet! A dangerous… and sad past (カツ！危険で…悲しい過去) | 19-08-2002 | 19.1% |
| 09 | Former he who is in danger and a rival of love (危険な元彼と恋のライバル) | 26-08-2002 | 17.7% |
| 10 | Seriously? A sudden kiss and accelerated love (マジ!?突然キスと恋の加速) | 02-09-2002 | 20.0% |
| 11 | Proposal to elder brother's wife (兄嫁にプロポーズ) | 09-09-2002 | 17.5% |
| 12 | The Reason for Lunch on Earth - Big Brother Returns! Who will be the victor in the battle of love? (地球上にランチがある理由 - 長男帰る！ 恋のバトルの勝者は？) | 16-09-2002 | 21.2% |
| Average | | | 18.9% |

The ratings are sourced from Video Research Ltd. Rating in red is the highest and in blue is the lowest.

== Awards and nominations ==
| Years | Awards | Categories | Recipients | Results | Ref. |
|---|---|---|---|---|---|
| 2002 | 34th Television Drama Academy Awards | Best Drama | | Won | |
| 2002 | 34th Television Drama Academy Awards | Best Casting | | Won | |
| 2002 | 34th Television Drama Academy Awards | Best Actress | Yūko Takeuchi | Won | |
| 2002 | 34th Television Drama Academy Awards | Best Supporting Actor | Tsumabuki Satoshi | Won | |
| 2002 | 34th Television Drama Academy Awards | Best Music | Yoshimata Ryo | Won | |
| 2002-2003 | 6th Nikkan Sports Drama Grand Prix | Best Actress | Yūko Takeuchi | Won | |
