= Magy (actor) =

Japanese actor

Magy (マギー Magī, born Yūichi Kojima, 児島雄一 Kojima Yūichi, on May 12, 1972) is a Japanese actor.

== Filmography ==
=== Television ===
- Influence (2021)
- The Grand Family (2021)
- Shin Abarenbō Shōgun (2025) as Inō Matayoshi
- The Laughing Salesman (2025)
- Brothers in Arms (2026) as Tsuda Sōgyū

=== Films ===
- Baragaki: Unbroken Samurai (2021) as Ōsawa Ippei
- Rika: Love Obsessed Psycho (2021)
- 99.9 Criminal Lawyer: The Movie (2021)
- The Quiet Yakuza 2: Part 1 (2024) as Kawanishi
- The Quiet Yakuza 2: Part 2 (2024) as Kawanishi
- Street Kingdom (2026)
