= Team Batista Final: Kerberos no Shōzō =

- Starring: Atsushi Itō; Tōru Nakamura; Mirei Kiritani; Tori Matsuzaka; Hidetoshi Nishijima; Ai Kato; Chiaki Kuriyama
- Release date: March 29, 2014 (Japan)
- Running time: 127 minutes
- Country: Japan
- Language: Japanese
- Box office: US$6,987,812

Team Batista Final: Kerberos no Shōzō (チーム・バチスタFINAL ケルベロスの肖像) is a 2014 Japanese mystery suspense film.

== Cast ==
- Atsushi Itō
- Tōru Nakamura
- Mirei Kiritani
- Tori Matsuzaka
- Hidetoshi Nishijima
- Ai Kato
- Chiaki Kuriyama

== Reception ==
As of April 17, 2014, the film has grossed US$6,987,812 in Japan.
