= Treasure Island (1978 TV series) =

1978 anime

- DVD cover

宝島 (Takarajima)
- Genre: Adventure, drama, mystery, supernatural
- Created by: Robert Louis Stevenson
- Anime television series
- Directed by: Osamu Dezaki
- Produced by: Keishi Yamazaki; Seiichi Ginya
- Written by: Haruya Yamazaki; Yoshimi Shinozaki
- Music by: Kentarō Haneda
- Studio: Tokyo Movie Shinsha
- Licensed by: NA: Discotek Media
- Original network: NNS (NTV)
- Original run: 8 October 1978 – 1 April 1979
- Episodes: 26
- Anime film
- Directed by: Yoshio Takeuchi (primary); Osamu Dezaki (supervising director)
- Written by: Haruya Yamazaki; Yoshimi Shinozaki
- Music by: Kentarō Haneda
- Studio: Tokyo Movie Shinsha
- Released: 9 May 1987
- Runtime: 88 minutes
- Original video animation

Takarajima Memorial - Yūnagi to Yobareta Otoko
- Directed by: Osamu Dezaki
- Written by: Osamu Dezaki
- Music by: Kentarō Haneda
- Studio: Tokyo Movie Shinsha; KSS
- Released: 21 December 1992
- Runtime: 7 minutes

Treasure Island (宝島, Takarajima) is a Japanese anime television series that aired in 1978 and 1979 in Japan and in the mid-1980s in Europe, Mexico, South America & Arab world countries, based on Robert Louis Stevenson's 1883 novel of the same name. In 2013, the 1987 film compilation was dubbed in English by Bang Zoom! Entertainment and available on the North American Hulu, but has since been removed. As of early 2016, TMS has made the compilation film available to watch on YouTube for free.

== Characters ==
=== Main characters ===
- Jim Hawkins: The main protagonist, he is depicted as a 13-year-old boy with a pet leopard cub named Benbow. He is often energetic and greatly admires Silver at first, but as the series progresses, he often tries to mask his confusion with Silver with anger, but cannot truly bring himself to hate the man. When Redruth gets killed, he is forced to face reality as it truly is.
- Long John Silver: The main antagonist and the cook on the voyage to Treasure Island, Silver is the secret ringleader of the pirate band. His physical and emotional strength is impressive. Silver is deceitful and disloyal, greedy and visceral, and does not care about human relations, yet he is always kind toward Jim and genuinely fond of the boy. Silver is a powerful mixture of charisma and self-destructiveness, individualism and recklessness.
- Gray: A young man from Ireland, he is almost incited to mutiny, but remains loyal to the Squire's side when asked to do so by Captain Smollett. He is very skilled with knife.
- Papy: Light-headed young pirate who often panics and does not have his own view, he is scared of John Silver.
- Smollett: The captain of the voyage to Treasure Island, Captain Smollett is savvy and is rightly suspicious of the crew Trelawney has hired.
- Livesey: The local doctor and judge, Dr. Livesey is wise and practical, and Jim respects but is not inspired by him. Livesey exhibits common sense and rational thought while on the island, and his idea to send Ben to spook the pirates reveals a deep understanding of human nature. He is fair-minded, magnanimously agreeing to treat the pirates with just as much care as his own wounded men.
- Ben Gunn: A former member of Flint's crew who became half insane after being marooned for three years on Treasure Island, having convinced another ship's crew that he was capable of finding Flint's treasure. He helps Jim by giving him the location of his homemade boat and scares the mutineers with his voice.
- Joyce: One of the manservants of Squire Trelawney, he accompanies him to the island. He is shot through the head and killed by a mutineer during an attack on the stockade.
- Hunter: The other manservant of Squire Trelawney, he also accompanies him to the island.
- Trelawney: A local Bristol nobleman, Trelawney arranges the voyage to the island to find the treasure. He is associated with civic authority and social power, as well as with the comforts of civilized country life (his name suggests both "trees" and "lawn"). He often acts childish during situations.
- Redruth: The gamekeeper of Squire Trelawney, he accompanies the Squire to the island but is shot and killed by the mutineers during an attack on the stockade.
- Arrow: The first mate of the Hispaniola, he drinks despite there being a rule about no alcohol on board and is useless as a first mate. He mysteriously disappears before they get to the island.

== Plot summary ==
Jim Hawkins is a young boy led by progressive events to embark on a search journey for the legendary treasure of the once dreaded pirate, Captain Flint. On their way to Treasure Island, John Silver, Jim's best friend (and eventually father-figure), takeover command of the ship revealing his true self as the ruthless pirate who was once the right hand of Flint himself. Feeling betrayed, Jim has to deal with his mixed emotions and face Silver who still consider himself and Jim as friends.

== Cast ==
Note: There are some differences between the Japanese cast of the TV series and the movie

Character	Japanese VA	English VA	Spanish VA	German VA	Arabic VA
John Silver	Genzō Wakayama (TV series); Michio Hazama (movie)	Richard Epcar	Maynardo Zavala	Michael Grimm	Wahid Jalal
Jim Hawkins	Mari Shimizu (TV series); Masako Nozawa (movie)	Erica Mendez	Alma Nuri	Marek Harloff	Antoinette Mallohi
Billy Bones	Ryo Kurosawa (TV series); Takeshi Aono (movie)	John Snyder	Maynardo Zavala	Ben Hecker	Wahid Jalal
Gray	Akio Nojima (TV series); Ryūsei Nakao (movie)	Kyle Hebert	Braulio Zertuche	Walter Wigand	Ismail Nanwo
Papy	Akira Kamiya (TV series and movie)	Todd Haberkorn			Ismail Nanwo
Smollett	Hideaki Esumi (TV series); Shūsei Nakamura (movie)	Jamieson Price	Carlos Agosti	Klaus Dittmann	Slahaden Mkllate
Hunter	Hiromitsu Mizushima			Christian Stark	Musa Mareb
Livesey	Iemasa Kayumi (TV series and movie)	Dave Mallow	Jesús Colin	Harald Pages	Juseph Nano
Trelawney	Junpei Takiguchi (TV series and movie)	Joe Ochman		Gerd Marcel	Michal Tabet
Ben Gunn	Kaneta Kimotsuki	Joe J. Thomas		Rahtjen	Ibrahim Marshli; Ishal Tabit
Redruth	Kōichi Kitamura	Joe J. Thomas			
Jim (adult)	Kiyotaka Mitsugi (TV series); Kenyu Horiuchi (movie); Koichi Yamadera (OVA)	Johnny Yong Bosch			Muhammad Ibrahim
George	Mitsuo Senda	Keith Silverstein		Christian Ahrens	Juseph Nano
Morgan	Reizō Nomoto	John Snyder			Ismail Nanwo
Lily	Rihoko Yoshida	Wendee Lee		Samira Chanfir	
Israel Hands	Shōzō Iizuka (TV series and movie)	Patrick Seitz	Eduardo Borja		Musa Mareb
Black Dog	Tesshō Genda	Christopher Corey Smith	Eduardo Liñan	Klaus-Peter Kaehler	Ismail Nanwo
