= The Unfettered Shogun =

Japanese television series started in 1978

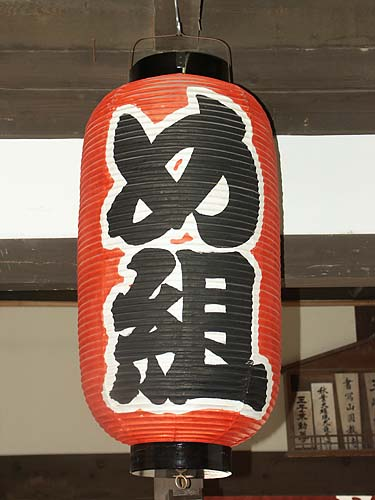
- Firefighters' lanterns from the Megumi
- Also known as: Abarenbō Shōgun
- Starring: Ken Matsudaira, Tadashi Yokouchi, Saburō Kitajima, Hiroshi Miyauchi, Ichiro Arishima
- Theme music composer: Shunsuke Kikuchi
- Composer: Shunsuke Kikuchi
- Country of origin: Japan
- No. of seasons: 12
- No. of episodes: 832

Production
- Running time: 45 minutes
- Production company: Toei Company

Original release
- Network: TV Asahi
- Release: January 7, 1978 – December 29, 2008

The Unfettered Shogun (暴れん坊将軍) (Abarenbō Shōgun) is a Japanese television program on the TV Asahi network. Set in the eighteenth century, it showed fictitious events in the life of Yoshimune, the eighth Tokugawa shōgun.

The program started in 1978 under the title Yoshimune Hyōbanki: Abarenbō Shōgun (Chronicle in Praise of Yoshimune: The Unfettered Shōgun) who went after rogue councilors and daimyō who were abusing their power. After a few seasons, they shortened the first two words and the show ran for two decades under the shorter title until the series ended in 2003; a two-hour special aired in 2004. The earliest scripts occasionally wove stories around historic events such as the establishment of firefighting companies of commoners in Edo, but eventually the series adopted a routine of strictly fiction.

Along with Zenigata Heiji (1966–1984, 888 episodes) and Mito Kōmon (1969–2011, 1,227 episodes), it ranks among the longest-running series in the jidaigeki genre. Like many other jidaigeki, it falls in the category of kanzen-chōaku, which loosely translates to "rewarding good and punishing evil".

== Repeating characters ==
=== Regulars ===
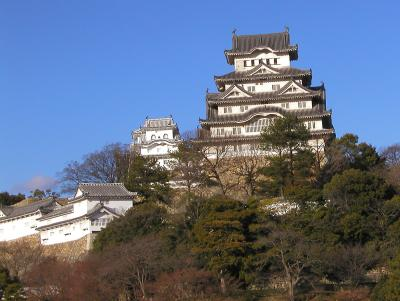
Himeji Castle, used in Abarenbō Shōgun in place of Edo Castle

Tokugawa Yoshimune

Disguised as Tokuda Shinnosuke—Shin-san to his friends—the third son of a hatamoto, the shogun roams freely about his capital, using the Megumi fire company as his base. The captain of the company knows his identity, but others are unaware that he is the shogun. Yoshimune-as-Shinnosuke is portrayed as the nearly invincible samurai warrior who seldom loses a fight no matter how many enemies opposing him there are.

Ōoka Echizen-no-Kami Tadasuke

Like Yoshimune, Tadasuke was a historical personage. Yoshimune appointed him to the position of Minami Machi Bugyō, one of the two chief administrators of Edo. In this office, he was mayor, police chief, judge and jury. He instituted and oversaw the operations of the commoners' fire companies. He also oversaw the Koishikawa "City Hospital" (Koishikawa Yōjōsho, another Yoshimune innovation). He was aware of Yoshimune's secret activities and originally did not approve, but grew to accept them as necessary and was a loyal accomplice. In the first episode, it was revealed that when he was Yamada Magistrate he had once reprimanded Yoshimune for illegal fishing when the shogun was younger, proving both his integrity and his devotion to the law.

Tadashi Yokouchi played Tadasuke for nearly twenty years; Ryō Tamura replaced him in the closing seasons.

Goyō toritsugi

The goyō toritsugi (御用取次) or soba yōnin (側用人) was the person who scheduled appointments for the Shogun. He is generally a man of advanced years. Yoshimune frequently referred to him informally as "jii" ("old man" or "gramps" [depending on the subtitle translation]) while in the castle while outside he would generally refer to him by the polite "oji-ue" ("uncle") outside. In the first two casts, the character's name was Kanō Gorozaemon (played by comic Ichirō Arishima). Next came Tanokura Magobei (Eiji Funakoshi), and a few followed in the cast changes of the last years of the show.

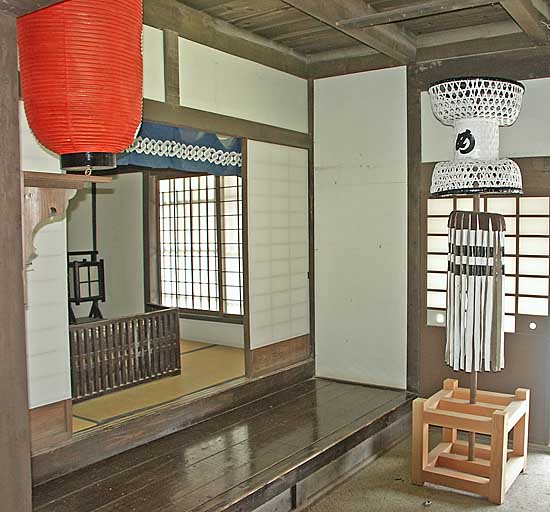
Megumi, the fire company on Abarenbō Shōgun

Fire captain

Tatsugorō, originally the boss of a construction gang, was the founder of the Megumi fire company and thus reported directly to Tadasuke. In the first episode, it was revealed that he was a former drinking and fighting companion of Yoshimune's before the young lord's elevation to the shogunate. Enka singer Saburō Kitajima played in the series from beginning to end. Although somewhat short-tempered and never one to shun a brawl for a righteous cause, this short, stocky character was altruistic to a fault, stubborn, and fiercely loyal to Yoshimune.

Kitajima also sang the closing theme songs for several years.

Later, Tatsugorō retired from the Megumi and assumed a different occupation; the writers of the series brought in Jōji Yamamoto, another singer (and a disciple of Kitajima) to play Chōjirō, the successor to Tatsugorō. In all, there were three captains during the series.

Women of Megumi

Three actresses played Osai, the feisty wife of Tatsugorō, and Omachi the younger sister of Tatsugorō. Later, when Tatsugorō left the fire company, the new captain Chōjirō married Obun, the young fishmonger/beat cop. The third captain was unmarried; his widowed sister Okyō was the lady of the Megumi.

Firemen

The cast always included half a dozen firefighters (hikeshi). While the roles were minor, together they were a prominent presence in the series. Character actors and comics played these parts.

The fire companies were named with a single kana such as め followed by the word -gumi. The show featured the Me-gumi, whose auspicious name could also mean "blessing"; the squad was formed in the third episode "The First Fireman's Banner".

In the first several years, a retired sumo wrestler named Ryūko was a member of the cast. He played a retired sumo wrestler named Ryūko, who was initially a guest of the captain. He later became a bone-setting doctor, and finally joined the crew of the fire company. Long after leaving the series, he made an appearance as a guest star.

Oniwaban (ninja)

The show always had a male and a female oniwaban from the Iga Clan who acted as both spies and bodyguards for Yoshimune. A few of the actors and actresses have gone on to starring roles in other series. The original female, Osono, was played by Yōko Natsuki. Her successor Sagiri, Asaka Mayumi in Season 2, is currently active. In the third series, Reiko Sugano played Hayate; then Takashima Reiko, who has gone on to star in television and film, succeeded her, with the name Kozue. Mayuko Irie (Akane), Akiko Andō (Koyuki), Hitoe Ōtake (Ayame), Chika Kochihira (Satsuki), Kaori Yamaguchi (Nagisa), and Kaori Matsunaga (Azami) followed, with Miki Murai appearing in the final special as Kaede. The men include Yabuta Sukehachi (portrayed by Hiroshi Miyauchi, who was killed saving Yoshimune's life in Season One Episode 87) and Ōtsuki Hanzō (Shun'ya Wazaki, who was appointed Sukehachi's replacement by Kanō Gorozaemon and made Oniwaban leader by Yoshimune in Episode 88) opposite Osono, the first Saizō (Shigeru Araki, paired with Hayate), Sagenta (Kiyotaka Mitsugi) and the second Saizō (played by Takayuki Godai). Hayami Saheiji (Toshihide Wakamatsu) in Season 6, Jūmonji Hayato, and finally Gorōta followed.

Narrator

Genzō Wakayama narrated the show from the first episode to the last.

=== Semi-regulars ===
Tokugawa Muneharu (徳川宗春)

The historical Yoshimune came to power when the main line of succession to the Tokugawa shogunate came to an end. He was chosen from the second of the three cadet branches of the Tokugawa clan, and the head of the senior branch, Muneharu, was passed over. The television series frequently presented Muneharu as a rival who tried to assassinate Yoshimune and take over the shogunate. Even when he did not appear, many villains acted in his name, or planned to receive their reward from Muneharu when he became shogun. First played by Akira Nakao and later by Tokuma Nishioka.

Yamada Asaemon (山田朝右衛門)

Nicknamed Kubikiri Asa. An executioner for the shogunate, he quits and becomes a rōnin and ally of Yoshimune. Asahi Kurizuka played the role in many episodes.

O-Yuri no Kata (お由利の方)

Also known as Jōen'in (浄円院). Yoshimune's mother. Sons of samurai overlords were often separated from their mothers at an early age to develop sternness in them, and Yoshimune was no different. Although Yoshimune offered Oyuri room and board in Edo Castle, she refused, living instead an austere life in a house often seen nearly falling apart. They love each other as an ordinary mother and son, but they conceal their relationship to others as this is part of the Shinnosuke myth used by the Shogun. Played by Tamao Nakamura.

== Guest stars ==
Over the course of a quarter of a century, the show featured a parade of celebrities. Singers, actors, and athletes of all ages played various roles, in some cases including themselves: Ryūko appeared as a guest several years after leaving the regular cast. Hibari Misora, the famous singer, also appeared in the series. Former and future regular characters occasionally made guest appearances.

Among the guest stars were the following:

- Yoshio Inaba
- Hiroyuki Sanada
- Tetsuro Tamba
- Rika Miura
- Nobuo Yana
- Masashi Ishibashi
- Nana Okada
- Toshiaki Nishizawa
- Hirohisa Nakata
- Yukari Yamamoto
- Midori Nishizaki
- Wakiko Kano
- Aiko Tachibana

== Stories ==
The show was frequently topical, and touched on many themes of present-day life, the most common subject being political corruption. Many shows covered include topics of current interest such as drugs, unequal power relationships, poverty, urbanization, the generation gap, yakuza, prostitution, inflation, and the tension between Japanese and foreign knowledge.

=== Climax ===
Yoshimune's order to commit harakiri: "be manly to atone for the sin"

At the end of about eight hundred episodes, Yoshimune confronts the corrupt official or officials in their safe haven. The official calls his men, but Yoshimune stands firm to reveal and criticize his crimes without hesitation. At first, the official behaves rudely and insultingly as he believes Yoshimune is just a man of low social status, but then after looking closely at Yoshimune's face has a flashback leading him to recognize Yoshimune as Shogun and kneel down in obeisance. However, on hearing Yoshimune's demand that he commit harakiri, he declares Yoshimune to be an impostor and orders his men to kill him. Always outnumbered, Yoshimune ends up easily defeating his attackers with the help of his male and female oniwaban. Using the unsharpened back side of his sword so as to injure without killing the corrupt official, he orders his oniwaban to execute him with the words, sei bai (Punish him!). In the premiere episode "The Star of Edo", Yoshimune confronts the main villain as himself inside Castle Edo and the villain recognizes him as the hatamoto; after attempting to flee, being disarmed by Yoshimune and being surrounded by Yoshimune's ninja and the palace guards, he is allowed to kill himself.

=== Lines of rebellion ===
In confronting Yoshimune, the official declares his rebellion with a variety of reasons, including the doubt of the appearance of the Shogun at that place and time or losing his respect to Yoshimune, etc., and it's one of the enjoyable points in the climax.

Example:

- Lord Tokugawa cannot be here
- He is an insolent person calling himself Lord Tokugawa
- It's fine if the person were Lord Tokugawa
- Everything ends, kill, kill him
- Lord Tokugawa, I will fight with you
- We lob your life, Lord Tokugawa
- You are just Shinnosuke Tokuda dying now
- I decorate the last minute as an evil (to defeat you)
- You are like a moth flying into the flame
- Your Highness exists because of us, subordinates' dedication (not because of your ability)
- The eighth shogunate will end
- Now is the time
- Shame on you
- Bring his head to our lord Muneharu
- I have forgotten the face of Lord Tokugawa
- There is no reason to obey the order of Lord Tokugawa
- It is you who cut your own body, not I
- We have planned to make you die
- You must give up your life
- I am a person who should have died at once (so, I'm not afraid if you try to execute me)
- If you know the situation completely, in for a penny, in for a pound
- How stupid saying who you are, it's the best timing that you show up here (to be killed)

== Cast ==
- Ken Matsudaira as Tokugawa Yoshimune
- Tadashi Yokouchi (first), Ryō Tamura (second) as Ōoka Tadasuke
- Megumi
  - Saburō Kitajima as Tatsugorō, the first captain
  - Masumi Harukawa (first), Yōko Asaji (second), Ryōko Sakaguchi (third) as Osai, wife of Tatsugorō

Misako Kinmura, as Omachi, sister of Tatsugorō

  - Jōji Yamamoto as Chōjirō, the second captain
  - Akiko Ikuina as Obun, wife of Chōjirō
  - Yūki Matsumura as Eigorō, third captain
  - Yōko Ishino as Okyō, sister of Eigorō
- Advisors to Yoshimune
  - Ichirō Arishima as Kanō Gorozaemon
  - Eiji Funakoshi as Tanokura Magobei
  - Tadao Takashima as Shishido Kanbei
  - Akira Nagoya as Arima Hikozaemon
  - Shigeru Kōyama as Yokokawa Kanjūrō
- Oniwaban (ninja)
  - Hiroshi Miyauchi as Yabuta Sukehachi
  - Shun'ya Wazaki as Ōtsuki Hanzō
  - Yōko Natsuki as Osono
  - Shigeru Araki as Koba Saizō
  - Asaka Mayumi as Sagiri
  - Kiyotaka Mitsugi as Sagenta
  - Takayuki Godai as Saizō
  - Reiko Sugano as Hayate
  - Reiko Takashima as Kozue
  - Mayuko Irie as Akane
  - Tarō Iketani as Kirihara Sasuke
  - Toshihide Wakamatsu as Hayami Saheiji
  - Akiko Andō as Koyuki
  - Takahito Ōmori as Jūmonji Hayato
  - Hitoe Ōtake as Ayame
  - Chika Kochihira as Satsuki
  - Kaori Yamaguchi as Nagisa
  - Miki Murai as Kaede
- Akira Nakao (first), Tokuma Nishioka (second) as Tokugawa Muneharu
- Asahi Kurizuka as Yamada Asaemon
- Tamao Nakamura as Oyuri, mother of Yoshimune
- Tsukasa Ito as Oyō, intern at the Koishikawa Yōjōsho
- Azusa Nakamura as Tsuruhime/Chizuru, love interest of Yoshimune
- Megumi Matsushita as Chinatsu, niece of Ōoka Tadasuke

== Music ==
Shunsuke Kikuchi wrote the opening theme, which is popular as a ring tone. He also composed the incidental music. Saburō Kitajima sang the closing theme songs to various series. Late series omitted the closing theme, having instead introductory music by Kikuchi leading into an opening theme song sung by Kitajima. Due to the show's popularity in the Hawaiian islands where a large portion of the population is Japanese, the opening theme has become one of the official sports themes played at University of Hawaii sporting events.

== Broadcasts ==
The original broadcasts were on the TV Asahi network in Japan. The Jidaigeki Senmon Channel has rebroadcast the series on cable and satellite. Also, full English-subtitled programs have been broadcast in Hawaii via KIKU and have become very popular even among younger generations probably due to the large Japanese-American population and heavy Asian influence on modern Hawaiian culture.

== Reception ==
The series has been called "the origin and pinnacle of 'Shogun' dramas".

== 2025 television film ==
The series was revived in the 2025 television film Shin Abarenbō Shōgun directed by Takashi Miike. Ken Matsudaira reprised his role as Tokugawa Yoshimune.
