= Yomigaeri =

- DVD cover
- Directed by: Akihiko Shiota
- Screenplay by: Isshin Inudo; Akihiko Shiota; Hiroshi Saito
- Based on: Yomigaeri by Shinji Kajio
- Produced by: Takashi Hirano
- Starring: Tsuyoshi Kusanagi; Yuko Takeuchi
- Cinematography: Tokusho Kikumura
- Edited by: Junichi Kikuchi
- Music by: Akira Senju
- Distributed by: Toho
- Release dates: November 2002 (premiere); 18 January 2003 (Japan)
- Running time: 126 minutes
- Country: Japan
- Language: Japanese
- Box office: $23,259,542

Yomigaeri (Japanese: 黄泉がえり) is a 2002 Japanese drama film directed by Akihiko Shiota and based on the novel of the same name by Shinji Kajio. The film features Tsuyoshi Kusanagi (of the pop group SMAP) and Yuko Takeuchi in the lead roles. It was released theatrically on 18 January 2003, in Japan.

== Plot ==
Set in the city of Aso in Kumamoto Prefecture, the film begins with scenes of individuals immediately after they have experienced unexplained and mysterious resurrection. One man and woman are uncovering long untouched musical instruments in a daze, and in one case a young boy finds himself alone in the forest, having suddenly reappeared after vanishing years earlier.

Eventually a representative from the Japanese Ministry of Welfare named Heita Kawada (Kusanagi) appears. It is his job to investigate this phenomenon, which begins to be seen not in just the two isolated cases, but in various locations around the city. He discovers on his way to his first meeting with the boy that the child's DNA has been found to match that of a boy who disappeared years earlier (through a match with the umbilical cord saved by the mother), though the child should biologically be now in middle age. This evidence suggests the cases of resurrection occur in such a way that the resurrected person reappears at the same age that he or she supposedly died.

Kawada, with his team of investigators, meets and interviews those who are purported to have reappeared after death, some of whom have been dead many years. The investigators also interview the families of the resurrected, who have aged (some significantly) since the death of the person who has now reappeared. In the case of the young boy, his mother has grown into an old woman, in other circumstances a youthful wife has reappeared to rejoin a husband now well into middle age.

The movie follows Kawada as he wrestles with the impossibility of the claims, which nevertheless seem to be based on empirically sound evidence. Kawada himself, a native of Aso, also reconnects with his old friend Aoi (Takeuchi), who shares with him a bitter memory of the death of Kawada's friend (and Aoi's lover) Shunsuke (Yusuke Iseya).

== Cast ==
- Tsuyoshi Kusanagi as Heita Kawada
- Yuko Takeuchi as Aoi Tachibana
- Yuriko Ishida as Reiko
- Show Aikawa as Shuhei
- Keiichi Yamamoto as Hideya Nakajima
- Yoshikazu Toshin as Yuichi Nakajima
- Hideo Takamatsu as Haruo Tsuda
- Misaki Ito as Sachiko
- Masami Nagasawa as Naomi Morishita
- Ko Shibasaki as RUI
- Hayato Ichihara as Yamada
- Yusuke Iseya as Shunsuke
