= Mt. Fuji Erupts: Are We Prepared? =

2026 Japanese TV miniseries directed by Takashi Miike

- Japanese promotional image
- Genre: Docudrama
- Screenplay by: Takeshi Takemura
- Directed by: Takashi Miike
- Country of origin: Japan
- Original language: Japanese
- No. of episodes: 2

Production
- Running time: 49 minutes per episode
- Production company: NHK

Original release
- Network: NHK
- Release: April 5 – April 12, 2026

Major Eruption of Mount Fuji: The Looming "Gray Nightmare" (Japanese: 富士山大噴火 迫る“灰色の悪夢”, Hepburn: Fujisan dai funka: Semaru "hairo no akumu"), released in English under the title Mt. Fuji Erupts: Are We Prepared?, is a 2026 Japanese two-part docudrama television miniseries with the drama segments directed by Takashi Miike.

== Synopsis ==
Following a major eruption of Mount Fuji, the subsequent heavy ash fall cuts of the electricity and communications in Tokyo. Truck driver Taishi Omuro must get his wife Miyako to the hospital for an emergency Caesarean section in the middle of the disaster.

== Cast ==
- Atsushi Itō as Taishi Omuro
- Aki Maeda as Miyako Omuro
- Hideko Hara as Fuku
- Ken Matsudaira as Eiji
- Makiko Watanabe
- Tsubaki Nekoze (猫背椿)
- Eiji Okuma
- Chio Murayama
- Nami Morimoto

== Production and purpose ==
The miniseries combines interviews with experts with a fictional story about a potential "worst-case scenario" of an eruption with a significant amount of volcanic ash demonstrating the damage countermeasures implemented by the Japanese government to maintain the provision of essential needs to its citizens. The television series was produced with the intent to encourage citizens to be prepared for such a potential scenario.

At a press conference at NHK in Shibuya on March 23, 2026, star Atsushi Itō stated, "I feel that having as many people as possible watch this program will directly contribute to raising everyone's awareness of disaster preparedness." He also stated that he had bought gas for his home as a precaution. His co-star Hideko Hara stated, "I don't want to provide this as entertainment, but rather I want as many people as possible to become aware of crisis management and disaster preparedness in the event of an eruption of Mount Fuji."

Director Takashi Miike stated, "This is a story of an ordinary family, not scholars or heroes. I hope you will experience the threat of nature vicariously with this family and move forward in order to survive. I would be happy if a light of hope is kindled in your heart afterward." Actress Aki Maeda stated, "Mount Fuji, a symbol that is always there, erupts violently. It was difficult to imagine just from hearing about it, but by experiencing it through filming, I felt like I was mentally preparing myself. Director Miike's energetic direction, camerawork, and detailed art and CGI techniques such as volcanic ash will allow viewers to experience it realistically."

== Broadcast and streaming release ==
Part 1, What Will Happen in the Tokyo Metropolitan Area? (その時、首都圏に何が？, Sono toki, shutoken ni nani ga?), aired at 9:00 p.m. on April 5, 2026, and part 2, The Threat of Volcanic Ash and Lava Flows (火山灰・溶岩流の脅威, Kazanbai / yōganryū no kyōi), aired at 9:00 p.m. on April 12, 2026. The episodes were later made available for one year on the NHK World Japan website on June 13, 2026, and June 14, 2026, respectively, with a mix of English dubbing for the narration and English subtitles for the dialogue.

== Reception ==
Noting the seemingly unintelligent behavior and decision-making of the family portrayed in the series, reviewer Diet Witch Aki wrote, "There are far too many people who are completely oblivious to the imminent danger to their lives and are just spacing out. I suspect they deliberately introduced this idiotic family to prevent the death toll from increasing."
