= Genzō Wakayama =

Japanese actor (1932–2021)

- 若山 弦蔵
- Born: September 27, 1932; Ōdomari, Karafuto Prefecture, Empire of Japan (now Korsakov, Sakhalin Oblast, Russia)
- Died: May 18, 2021 (aged 88)
- Occupations: Actor; voice actor; DJ; radio personality

Genzō Wakayama (若山 弦蔵, Wakayama Genzō; September 27, 1932 — May 18, 2021) was a Japanese actor, voice actor and DJ. He moved to Sapporo, Hokkaido as a youth and graduated from Sapporo South High School.

Due to his low bass voice, Wakayama often voiced villainous or calm characters. He is the official Japanese dub-over artist of actors Sean Connery, Gene Barry, Raymond Burr, Hugh O'Brian and John Bromfield. Also, He was the first dub-over artist of Lee Marvin in his early days. As a disc jockey, Wakayama hosted a program on TBS Radio from 1973 to 1995 that ran for 5,700 installments. Wakayama also narrated over 800 episodes of the television jidaigeki The Unfettered Shogun from 1978 to 2003.

He died due to heart failure on May 18, 2021. A private service was held by his family.

== Roles ==
=== Television animation ===
- Astro Boy (1963) (Detective Boon)
- Shin Takarajima (1965) (Ship Captain (Bear))
- Harris no Kaze (1966) (Principal)
- Treasure Island (1978-1979) (Long John Silver)

=== Theatrical animation ===
- Doraemon: Nobita's Great Adventure into the Underworld (1984) (Demaon)
- Hoshi o Katta Hi (2006) (Scoppello)

=== Theatrical Tokusatsu ===
- Gamera vs. Viras (1968) (Viras)

=== Video games ===
Year	Title	Role	Console	Source
2005	Kingdom Hearts II	Ansem the Wise	PlayStation 2	
2007	Kingdom Hearts Re:Chain of Memories	Ansem the Wise	Game Boy Advance	
2009	Kingdom Hearts 358/2 Days	Ansem the Wise	Nintendo DS	
2010	Kingdom Hearts Birth by Sleep	Ansem the Wise	PlayStation Portable	
2012	Kingdom Hearts 3D: Dream Drop Distance	Ansem the Wise	Nintendo 3DS	
2019	Kingdom Hearts III	Ansem the Wise, Zeus	PlayStation 4, Xbox One	
2020	Final Fantasy VII Remake	President Shinra	PlayStation 4	
2020	Kingdom Hearts: Melody of Memory	Ansem the Wise	PlayStation 4, Nintendo Switch, Xbox One	

=== Dubbing roles ===
==== Live-action ====
- Sean Connery
  - Dr. No (1976 TBS and 2006 DVD editions) (James Bond)
  - From Russia with Love (1976 TBS and 2006 DVD editions) (James Bond)
  - Goldfinger (1974 NTV and 2006 DVD editions) (James Bond)
  - Marnie (1969 TV Asahi edition) (Mark Rutland)
  - Thunderball (1977 TBS and 2006 DVD editions) (James Bond)
  - You Only Live Twice (1978 TBS and 2006 DVD editions) (James Bond)
  - The Red Tent (Roald Amundsen)
  - The Anderson Tapes (John "Duke" Anderson)
  - Diamonds Are Forever (1980 TBS and 2006 DVD editions) (James Bond)
  - The Man Who Would Be King (Daniel Dravot)
  - The First Great Train Robbery (Edward Pierce)
  - Meteor (1981 Fuji TV edition) (Paul Bradley)
  - Never Say Never Again (1985 Fuji TV and WOWOW editions) (James Bond)
  - The Untouchables (1990 Fuji TV and 2003 TV Tokyo editions) (Jim Malone)
  - The Presidio (1991 Fuji TV edition) (Lt. Col. Alan Caldwell)
  - Family Business (Jessie McMullen)
  - Indiana Jones and the Last Crusade (1993 Fuji TV and 1994 NTV editions) (Professor Henry Jones)
  - The Hunt for Red October (1993 TBS edition) (Captain Marko Ramius)
  - The Russia House (Barley Blair)
  - Highlander II: The Quickening (Juan Sánchez Villa-Lobos Ramírez)
  - Robin Hood: Prince of Thieves (1993 Fuji TV and 2004 TV Tokyo editions) (King Richard)
  - Medicine Man (Dr. Robert Campbell)
  - Just Cause (1997 TV Tokyo edition) (Paul Armstrong)
  - Dragonheart (Software and NTV editions) (Draco)
  - The Rock (Software and 1999 NTV editions) (John Patrick Mason)
  - Playing by Heart (Paul)
  - Entrapment (2007 TV Tokyo edition) (Robert "Mac" MacDougal)
  - The League of Extraordinary Gentlemen (Allan Quatermain)
- Gene Barry
  - Burke's Law (Amos Burke)
  - Columbo: Prescription: Murder (Dr. Ray Fleming)
  - Istanbul Express (Michael London)
  - The Name of the Game (Glenn Howard)
- Lee Marvin
  - M Squad (Detective Lt. Frank Ballinger)
  - The Twilight Zone (Conny Miller)
  - Sergeant Ryker (Sgt. Paul Ryker)
  - The Klansman (Sheriff Track Bascomb)
- Airplane! (1983 TBS edition) (Captain Clarence Oveur (Peter Graves))
- Dracula (1964 TV Asahi edition) (Count Dracula (Bela Lugosi))
- The Eiger Sanction (1978 Fuji TV edition) (Ben Bowman (George Kennedy))
- Ironside (Detectives Robert T. Ironside (Raymond Burr))
- The Life and Legend of Wyatt Earp (Wyatt Earp (Hugh O'Brian))
- The Outer Limits (Opening narration)
- Perry Mason (Perry Mason (Raymond Burr))
- The Prisoner (Number Two (Guy Doleman))
- The Sheriff of Cochise (Sheriff Frank Morgan (John Bromfield))
- The Sound of Music (1978 Fuji TV edition) (Captain von Trapp (Christopher Plummer))
- Thomas and Friends season 13 (Henry the Green Engine)

==== Animation ====
- Hercules (Zeus)
- Lippy the Lion & Hardy Har Har (Lippy the Lion)
- The Dick Tracy Show (Dick Tracy) (1961)
- Treasure Planet (2003) (John Silver)
