= Matsuken Samba II =

2004 song performed by Ken Matsudaira

"マツケンサンバII"

Single by Ken Matsudaira
- Language: Japanese
- English title: Matsuken Samba II
- Written: 1994
- Released: July 7, 2004
- Genre: J-POP
- Length: 4:57
- Label: NBCUniversal Entertainment Japan
- Songwriter: Kyoko Yoshimine
- Composer: Akira Miyagawa

Music video
- 【公式】松平健「マツケンサンバⅡ」 MV on YouTube; MATSUKENSAMBAⅡ (English ver.)／KEN MATSUDAIRA on YouTube

Matsuken Samba II (マツケンサンバII) is one of the songs in the “Matsuken Samba” series sung by Ken Matsudaira, a Japanese actor and renowned for his samurai roles.

The Matsuken in the title is a shortened version of the singer's name, a combination of Matsu from Matsudaira and his stage name Ken.

The song was written in 1994 and sung on stage where he performed. When it was first released in 2004, it was a success, ranking high on the Japanese charts and becoming one of the most popular songs in Japan.

In 2022, a version with English lyrics was released.

== Overview ==
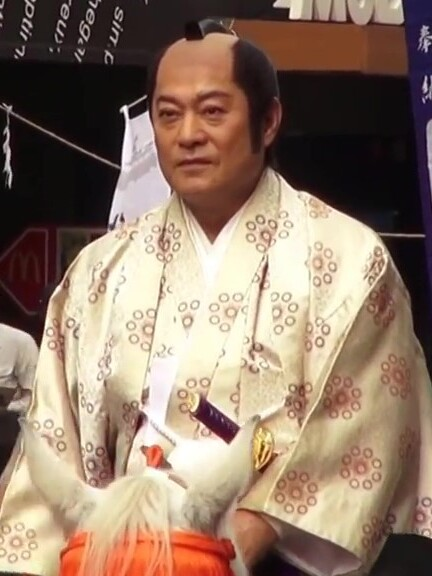
Ken Matsudaira in 2016

The song was made in 1994 and is performed in theaters since then. He sings the song in an appearance of a person in Edo period with florid golden kimono, dancing with steps of samba and hip swaying, and with many male and female backup dancers around also in figures of the period.

Matsudaira originally played the role of the serious shōgun (Tokugawa Yoshimune, Japan's greatest samurai, or military leader) in the TV series “The Violent Shogun” for 25 years, playing a brilliant samurai who was strong, selfless, disliked showy things, had no interest in women or money, and would execute justice as soon as he found an evil person. He had been performing the song only in theaters, the performance amazed people who did not know it upon being introduced on television in 2004.

In 2005, the song was featured in the New York Times, which said, “Perhaps it was the equivalent of Americans waking up one morning to find John Wayne transformed into the Cowboy of the Village People.".

The song became the biggest hit in the Matsuken Samba series. All the songs in the series combine traditional-style Japanese vocals with a slight Latino flair from Brazilian samba music and the inclusion of several Spanish as well as Brazilian Portuguese terms and phrases in the lyrics (this although the lyrics of Matsuken Samba II mention the "bongo" which is a musical instrument not used in samba). The performances of the songs have a very glitzy, showy production value trademarked by his glittery appearance.

Matsudaira decide on the costumes he would wear when singing this song. Referencing Broadway musicals, which he regularly visited for inspiration, he used women's dress fabric purchased in New York for the costume material. To match the flamboyant costume, he chose a wig with brown hair, a color favored by today's youth. The two strands of hair hanging down on each side were a symbol of male sex appeal and were dyed gold for added effect.

The song was composed with a longer intro (1 minute 6 seconds) to give him time to change outfits for the show.

== History ==
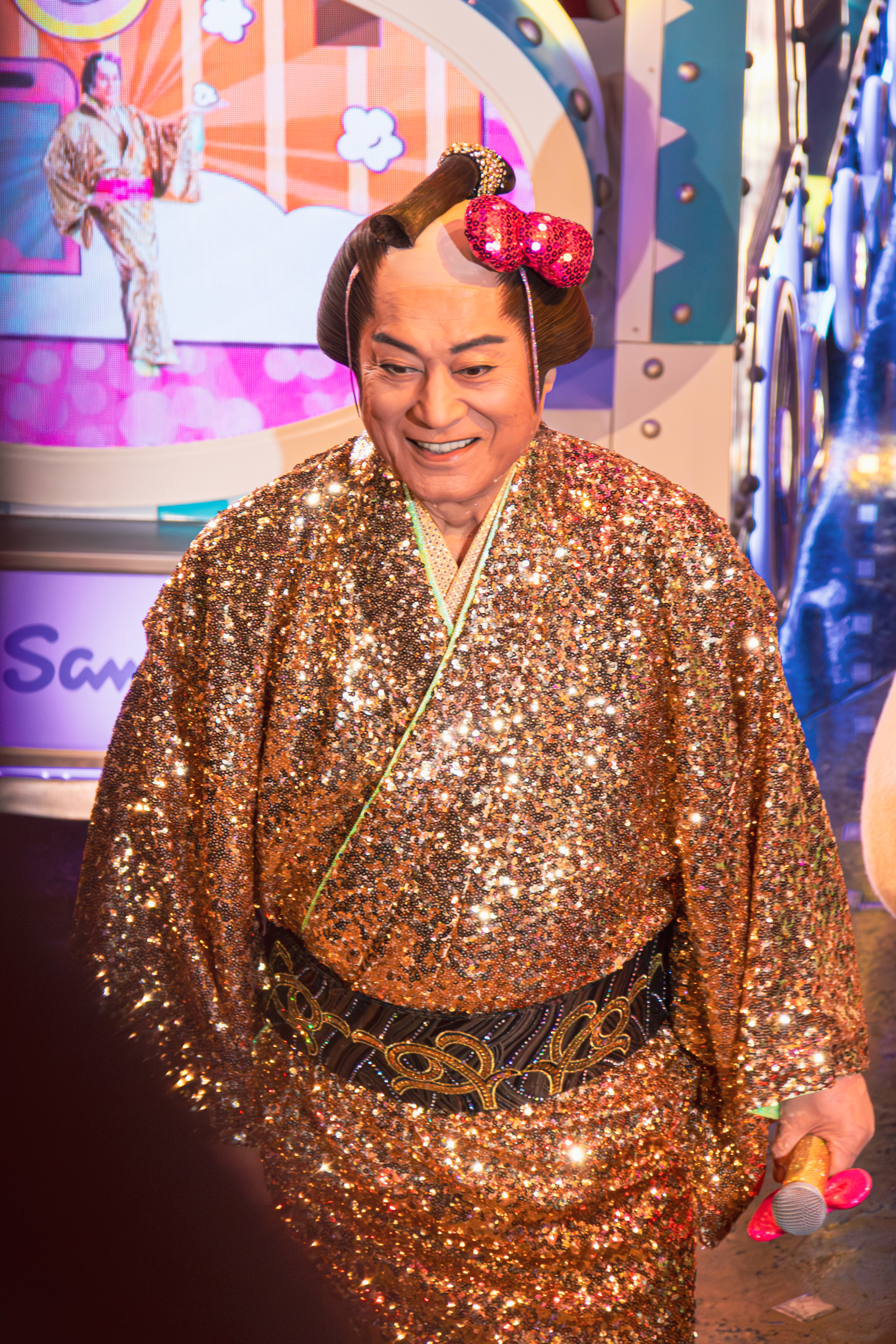
Matsudaira dressed in a costume for a song performance (2026)

The first single of the line was this Matsuken Samba II, released on July 7, 2004. The song was officially a sequel to Matsuken Samba I that he had been performing at the close of his concerts prior to 2004, which was not released on CDs until it was added as one of the b-sides to Matsuken Samba II.

Upon release, the song was a modest hit, mostly among Matsudaira's fanbase of primarily middle-aged women. But a gradual increase in media coverage and an affectionate parody of the song and dance by Katsuken on the popular idol group SMAP's television show SMAP×SMAP made the song a certified hit. The single remained on the Oricon Top 100 chart for over a year, and spawned two additional single releases: Matsuken Samba II: Ole! EP, a CD of remixes of the original single, and Matsuken Samba III, a follow-up single that borrowed liberally from its predecessor. The latest in the series, released in 2014, is "Matsuken Samba 4 - Jounetsu no Salsa (マツケンサンバ4~情熱のサルサ~)", and as the title implies, it is more so a Salsa than a Samba.

There are related songs such as Matsuken Mambo (マツケンマンボ), Matsuken de GO! (マツケンでGO!), Matsuken no AWA Odori (マツケンのAWA踊り; Matsuken's Awa dance), Te o Tsunagou ~Matsuken × Kamen Rider Samba~ (手をつなごう～マツケン×仮面ライダーサンバ～, Te o Tsunagou ~Matsuken × Kamen Raidā Sanba~; the ending theme to Kamen Rider OOO Wonderful: The Shogun and the 21 Core Medals), Android Matsuken Samba (アンドロイドマツケンサンバ) as well as the Bollywood-themed "Matsuken Maharaja" and the MatsuKen Samba II x Let's Go! Phantom Thief Girls -TeddyLoid ULTRA MASHUP ver.- (マツケンサンバII×行くぜっ!怪盗少女 -TeddyLoid ULTRA MASHUP ver.-), a collaboration with Momoiro Clover Z.

In 2024, the “50th Anniversary Edition” was released to commemorate his 50th anniversary in show business, and at the same time the “English ver".

In 2025, the song was chosen as the ending song for the anime “From Bureaucrat to Villainess”. The song is sung by the voice actors of the anime, and Matsudaira does not participate in the song at all, even though the lyrics include a shortened form of his name.
