= Takahiro Itō =

Japanese actor and voice actor

- Born: June 25, 1987; Funabashi, Chiba, Japan
- Died: March 8, 2009 (aged 21); Lake Sagami, Midori-ku, Sagamihara, Kanagawa Prefecture, Japan
- Occupations: Actor, voice actor
- Years active: 1992–2008

Takahiro Itō (伊藤隆大, Itō Takahiro; June 25, 1987 – March 8, 2009) was a Japanese actor and voice actor. He graduated from the Chiba Prefectural Kōnodai High School and enrolled in the Career Design course of Hosei University. He was attached to Quarter Tone. He was the younger brother of actor Atsushi Itō.

On March 8, 2009, Itō's body was discovered inside an automobile in a parking lot near Lake Sagami in Sagamihara, Kanagawa Prefecture, along with some yeontan (apparently used to commit suicide) and a note addressed to his family. The cause of death was determined to be acute carbon monoxide poisoning.

== Roles ==
=== Films ===
- Andromedia (Boy on the bus)

=== Television drama ===
- Train Man (Chūbō)
- Nodame Cantabile (Haruto Segawa)

== Voice acting roles ==
=== Dubbing ===
- Jack the Bear (Dylan Leary (Miko Hughes))
- Lost in Space (Will Robinson (Jack Johnson))
- Mentors (Oliver Cates (Chad Krowchuk)
- The Shining (Danny Torrance (Danny Lloyd))
- Teenage Mutant Ninja Turtles III (Yoshi (Travis A. Moon))

=== Television animation ===
- Boogiepop Haharawanai
