= Atsushi Itō (actor) =

Japanese actor (born 1983)

- Born: November 25, 1983 (age 42); Funabashi, Chiba, Japan
- Education: Hosei University
- Years active: 1988 – present
- Children: 3

Atsushi Itō (伊藤 淳史, Itō Atsushi; born November 25, 1983) is a Japanese actor. He started acting at the age of three in education programs. He is currently studying at Hosei University Business Faculty. He is frequently cast as geeky or otaku characters. Itō is the older brother of the actor and voice actor Takahiro Itō, who committed suicide in 2009. He was married on May 1, 2010 and has a daughter born on October 29, 2015.

== Filmography ==
=== Television ===
- Kasuga no Tsubone (1989), Takechiyo
- Yoshitsune (2005), Kisanta
- Train Man (2005), Tsuyoshi "Train Man" Yamada
- Glory of Team Batista (2008), Kōhei Taguchi
- Team Batista 2: The Triumphant Return of General Rouge (2010), Kōhei Taguchi
- Team Batista 3: Ariadne's Bullet (2011), Kōhei Taguchi
- Team Batista 4: Raden Meikyu (2014), Kōhei Taguchi
- Unbound (2025), Daimonji-ya
- The Big Chase: Tokyo SSBC Files (2025), Osamu Kisawa
- Mt. Fuji Erupts: Are We Prepared? (2026), Taishi Omuro

=== Film ===
- Robot Contest (2003)
- Umizaru (2004), Hajime Kudo
- Flowers in the Shadows (2008), Raita
- Bayside Shakedown 3 (2010), Shinjiro Waku
- Bayside Shakedown: The Final (2012), Shinjiro Waku
- Team Batista the Movie: The Portrait of Kerberos (2014), Kōhei Taguchi
- Flying Colors (2015), Yoshitaka Tsubota
- Neko Atsume House (2017), Masaru Sakumoto
- The Bonds of Clay (2021), Ryusei Takahashi
- Black Showman (2025), Kenta Nakajo
- Tokyo MER: Mobile Emergency Room – Capital Crisis (2026), Tatsuya Aoto
- Bayside Shakedown: N.E.W (2026), Shinjiro Waku
- When I Saw Your Sound (2027)

=== Music videos ===
- Dreams Come True [JET!!!/SUNSHINE]

== Awards and nominations ==
Year	Award	Category	Work(s)	Result	Ref.
2006	30th Elan d'or Awards	Newcomer of the Year	Himself	Won	
2016	39th Japan Academy Film Prize	Best Supporting Actor	Flying Colors	Nominated	
