= Shin Abarenbō Shōgun =

2025 Japanese jidaigeki TV film by Takashi Miike

- Japanese poster
- Based on: The Unfettered Shogun
- Screenplay by: Mika Ōmori
- Directed by: Takashi Miike
- Starring: Ken Matsudaira
- Country of origin: Japan
- Original language: Japanese

Production
- Producers: Nobuyuki Hattori; Hideaki Tsukada
- Running time: 95 minutes
- Production companies: TV Asahi; Toei Company; OLM

Original release
- Network: TV Asahi
- Release: January 4, 2025

Shin Abarenbō Shōgun (新・暴れん坊将軍) (literally: New Wild Shogun) is a 2025 Japanese jidaigeki TV film directed by Takashi Miike. It is a revival of the Japanese TV series The Unfettered Shogun, the second-longest-running Japanese series starring the same lead actor, and presents fictitious events in the life of Yoshimune, the eighth Tokugawa shōgun. Ken Matsudaira, star of the original The Unfettered Shogun series, reprised his role in the TV film.

== Plot ==
In Edo-period Japan, eighth shōgun Tokugawa Yoshimune of the Kishū Tokugawa family confronts junior elder Honma Yōzō for enabling Tsuruya Shirōbē to obtain a monopoly that is causing skyrocketing inflation in the price of rapeseed and rapeseed oil. Honma Yōzō refuses to commit seppuku, so he is killed by Yoshimune's spies Hachibē and Koharu. When the shōgun is not using his powerful position to fight injustice and punish wrongdoers, he sometimes adopts the role of Tokuda Shinnosuke, third son of a poor junior retainer of the shogunate, and maintains order in town through this persona as well. The only person who knows Shinnosuke's true identity is Tatsugorō, head of the Me group of Edo firefighters.

The country goes into a recession, leading to uprisings, and a plague of rice-eating grasshoppers breaks out in the western provinces, leading to the Kyōhō famine beginning in 1732. Yoshimune demands frugality from the leaders in the country and tells Koshino Saemonnosuke to send people to the affected western provinces of Shikoku and Chuugoku. The elderly deputy Kanō Gorōzaemon informs Yoshimune that his heir, Ieshige, has developed a bad reputation among the citizens due to his temperamental nature. Embarrassed by his own speech defect, Ieshige communicates though magistrate Ōoka Tadamitsu, who has assisted him since he was a child. Ieshige's younger brother Kojirō, who has come of age and been granted leadership of the Tayasu family and developed into a warrior who changed his name to Munetake, is viewed by many as a more appropriate heir. Yoshimune slips into the role of Tokuda Shinnosuke to visit the provinces and investigate the feelings of the citizens himself. Shinnosuke overhears the drunken Tokunagaya Tomitarō, third son of a merchant, openly expressing his lack of confidence in the shōgun, calling him a cheapskate.

Takurō, Yashichi, and the rest of their gang attempt to abduct Okinu, daughter of lumber merchant Inō Matayoshi, and she screams for help. Shinnosuke comes to her aid and fights of the gang. Tokunagaya Tomitarō initially fights against Shinnosuke, but when he recognizes him as his father, he joins his side and helps him fight the gang by wielding a ringed rapier in his good left hand. Tatsugorō, Hanjirō, and other members of the Me group arrive and frighten off the gang. Okinu explains that she ran away from home because her father, whose lumber business is floundering due to the existence of the Edo firefighters, is trying to go into a new business and wanted her to marry into a family of goods importers from the western provinces. She encountered Ranmaru, who tricked her into signing an agreement with Takurō, who attempted to force her into prostitution before she escaped. Yoshimune Tells Ieshige that he is now read to study to become the next shōgun, but Ieshige refuses, saying that his unhappiness stems from the pressure of being the eldest son of the shōgun. He says that he will gladly give up that position.

Honma Yōjirō, son of Honma Yōzō, informs Munetake that the head of the Owari Tokugawa family, Tokugawa Muneharu, may rebel and attempt to take power. Muneharu spends lavishly on the arts and dresses extravagantly, brazenly disobeying Yoshimune's orders to live frugally during the recession. Okinu's father Inō Matayoshi brings Munetaka a gun and asks for permission to quit the lumber business and begin bringing in these new weapons in preparation for a potential war with the Owari Tokugawa family.

Several female corpses are found in the water. Hachibē tells Yoshimune that money from the emergency rice fund has gone missing. Okudaira pressures Yoshimune to select an heir, suggesting Munetake for the position. Sakagami Eiji tells Koshino that Munetake was given western weapons, leading Koshino to surmise that the money from the emergency rice fund was used to buy weapons. Koshino and Sakagami are then killed by Takurō and his men.

Nagamatsu, who secretly works with Takurō, lies to Tokugawa Muneharu that the government is planning to attack the Owari branch. Takemoto Masatsuna suggests following the shōgun's order to live frugally. Muneharu rejects this idea, saying that Yoshimune should retire. Elsewhere, Okudaira Shigenori promises to appoint Honma Yōjirō to a significant post once he becomes Chief Elder. Yōjirō suggests putting an early end to the shōgun and staging it to make it look like an attack by the Owari Tokugawa family.

Takurō and his gang abduct Okinu. Ieshige, under the persona of Tokunagaya Tomitarō, visits a teahouse and finds Ranmaru holding women captive. Tomitarō and Hachibē subdue Ranmaru and notify the South Magistrate's office. Munetake brings his gun to Ieshige and says that he will take over as shōgun and use his new weapons to make the citizens obey if Ieshige does not want to become shōgun, but Ieshige says that weapons should not be used to coerce the citizens.

Muneharu rides into town and Takurō and his gang lead the locals in openly praising his extravagant appearance in contrast to the cheapskate shōgun. Muneharu gives Yoshimune his book Nurturing Knowledge as the Key to Governance containing many essays, including "Make use of money: Excessive frugality is actually ungainful" and "The arts are nutrition for the people: Exhibitions and tea houses are to be allowed".

Honma Yōjirō tells Okudaira and Inō Matayoshi to sell weapons to Munetake as well as to the Owari Tokugawa family in order to make money from both sides of the conflict. Takurō brings in new girls he has captured, including Okinu, whom Inō Matayoshi offers as a concubine to Yōjirō. Hisame sends a secret message by cat informing Ieshige of Okinu's location. Hachibē informs Yoshimune that the funds for emergency rice are being spent on Western weapons. Realizing that they are about to be exposed, Honma Yōjirō tells Okudaira to lead an attack on Owari under Munetake's command. Okudaira is afraid of fighting and instead suggests that Yōjirō kill Yoshimune, Ieshige and Munetake so that Okudaira can create a new government and appoint Yōjirō to a powerful position. Okudaira kills Inō in front of his daughter Okinu. Takurō, Sukeroku and the rest of the gang gather volunteers to fight against the Owari Tokugawa family. As Tomitarō, Ieshige confronts Takurō. Takurō reveals that his gang is composed of ninja from the remnants of the Fūma clan. Ieshige defeats them and rescues Okinu with the aid of Hisame, who kills Takurō.

Yoshimune confronts Okudaira and his retainers as they prepare for war. Honma Yōjirō attempts to flee but is caught by Ieshige. Yoshimune defeats the retainers, then Hachibē and Koharu kill Yōjirō and Okudaira, preventing a war a war with the Owari Tokugawa family. South Magistrate Ōoka Tadasuke visits Muneharu to investigate the connection to Honma Yōjirō, but Muneharu cannot be found. The sparks of war thereby die out.

Muneharu goes into debt and sells off his weapons. Okinu rebuilds her father's lumber business and meets Itō Jokin, a painter. Yoshimune gives Ieshige a ceremonial fan with the words "sincere heart" painted on it to match Yoshimune's own fan with "justice" written on it.

== Cast ==
- Ken Matsudaira as Tokugawa Yoshimune / Tokuda Shinnosuke
- Daigo Nishihata as Tokugawa Ieshige / Tokunagaya Tomitarō
- Kiita Komagine as Tokugawa Munetake
- Sawako Fujima as Okinu
- Gackt as Tokugawa Muneharu
- Takehiko Ono as Kanō Gorōzaemon (加納五郎左衛門 / かのう ごろうざえもん)
- Manabu Hamada as Yabuta Hachibē (藪田八兵衛 / やぶた はちべえ)
- Hirotarō Honda as Honma Yōzō
- Satoshi Jinbo as Okudaira Shigenori (奥平重徳 / おくだいら しげのり)
- Masanobu Katsumura as Ōoka Tadasuke
- Ryō Kimura as Ōoka Tadamitsu
- Shuichiro Naito as Ranmaru
- Arisa Nakajima as Koharu
- Katsuhisa Namase as Tatsugorō
- Ichika Osaki as Hisame
- Yukiyoshi Ozawa as Honma Yōjirō
- Kiyohiko Shibukawa as Takurō
- Reiko Takashima as Osai
- Magy as Inō Matayoshi
- Yui Ota as Omine
- Jun Hasegawa as Nagamatsu
- Yojin Hino as Takemoto Masatsuna (竹本正綱)
- Kokoro Terada as Itō Jokin
- Yurito Mori as Tokugawa Kogorō
- Kōta Masago as Merchant
- Shigeru Chiba (narrator)
- Unknown actor as Koshino Saemonnosuke
- Unknown actress as Osetsu, daughter of Osai and Tatsugorō
- Unknown actor as Sakagami Eiji
- Unknown actor as Yashichi, a member of Takurō's gang
- Unknown actor as Sukeroku, a member of Takurō's gang

== Production ==
In February 2023, TV Asahi created an official Twitter account for the series at x.com/abarenbo2025, where the network gave updates about the production of the series.

Ken Matsudaira explained that he personally suggested his own reprisal of the role as an older man.

On November 29, 2024, it was reported that Ken Matsudaira had said, "now, things like family and home life have never been depicted, but this time, three sons appear in the story. It depicts parent-child love and a succession struggle in a way that hasn't been seen before, and I think it will be a very rich and excellent work. Also, in true Takashi Miike style, the fight scenes are challenging with a different filming technique than before, so I myself am really looking forward to the finished product. I hope many people will watch it."

On December 8, 2024, co-stars Ken Matsudaira and Daigo Nishihata, who play father and son in the film, appeared together at a press conference. Nishihata said, "Director Miike's filming style is unique, and he's incredibly fast. He shoots scene after scene so quickly, it surprised me. But instead of shooting from every angle, he focused on capturing each moment, which was very refreshing and educational." Matsudaira added, "The style is definitely different from the previous series. Even in the fight scenes, he shot many detailed close-ups of the hands and other movements. I'm really looking forward to seeing how it all comes together. I had an image of Director Miike, the master of violence, as being 'brutal' (laughs), but in this 'New Abarenbo Shogun,' he respected the previous world view and, while being innovative, also followed the image of the series." Nishihata stated that the drama "includes the issue of succession, but it's also a satirical story that incorporates social problems happening in modern times, so I think it's content that even the younger generation can enjoy." Nishihata also stated that performing in the drama was his first time wearing a topknot hairstyle and sword fighting.

Gackt stated, "I have often watched 'Abarenbo Shogun' myself for a long time, so it is an 'honor' to be able to co-star with Ken-san in that work. I feel very honored." Describing the director, he stated, "Miike’s films are unique, both in terms of their camera layout and storyline. Although this work is a historical drama, it has a good tempo and I have high expectations for what kind of work it will turn out to be. I think Mr. Miike’s way of thinking is quite different from past historical dramas, but I would be happy if it could help young people realize that historical dramas are interesting."

On December 12, 2024, the website natalie.mu reported, "Actor Ken Matsudaira attended the black bean offering ceremony held today, December 12th, at Ueno Toshogu Shrine in Tokyo. Matsudaira, known for his role as Tokugawa Yoshimune in the drama 'Abarenbo Shogun,' offered black beans to the Tokugawa shogunate, a tradition that has continued since the mid-Edo period. Yoshimune is known as a shogun who contributed to improving the quality of black beans, and because the quality of the black beans offered from the Sasayama domain was high, he encouraged local production. It is said that this event led to the continued offering of black beans to the Tokugawa shogunate until the end of the Edo period. Matsudaira bowed and proceeded to the Golden Hall to offer the new crop of black beans."

The website natalie.mu reported on January 3, 2025, that "Matsudaira recalled his feelings when he received the offer, saying, 'I had been hoping for the revival of "Abarenbo Shogun" for a long time, so I immediately replied, "I definitely want to do it."' He said he was surprised that 'Abarenbo Shogun' has been well-received by younger generations in recent years, but added, 'I think the revival was made possible because of that enthusiasm, so I'm very grateful.'"

The website jprime.jp reported on January 4, 2025, that Matsudaira said, "In order to do 'Abarenbo Shogun' again, I had to stay healthy at all times. So, I always kept my body moving. I walk for 30 minutes to an hour every morning. I also never miss stretching. So, I didn't do anything special to prepare before filming, and I didn't feel any gap in playing Yoshimune again after 17 years."

== Broadcast ==
The film was initially broadcast on TV Asahi at 9:00 p.m. on Saturday, January 4, 2025. It was later streamed on TVer.

== Reception ==
The website onderhond.com gave the film a rating of 2 out of 5 stars. The review reads, "I'll watch anything Miike, but this clearly wasn't for me. It's a TV film based on one of Japan's longest-running TV series, which I'd never heard of before. Without knowing the characters, and not being a big fan of samurai fiction, this was very tough to get into, so be warned if you're giving this a shot. There are some famous names present, but this is very much a project with strong TV roots, meaning it looks cheap and rushed. Keep your expectations low, and there are some decent moments and somewhat memorable scenes. But unless you're a Miike completist or a big fan of the original series, there's no reason to chase this one."

A review on daishosha.com reads, "When we 'appreciate' this story, we experience the repetitive structure, that is, the process of 'stylistic beauty.' The villains' schemes, Shinnosuke's undercover investigation, and the climactic sword fight. Each of these functions as a perfect 'expected element,' fulfilling the viewer's expectations without fail. This is by no means monotonous. Rather, over the many years of broadcasting, it has been refined and perfected into the 'ultimate form.' Deeply understanding and appreciating this process of stylistic beauty is the key to fully enjoying this timeless masterpiece. [...] In today's unpredictable and uncertain society, the 'absolute sense of security' that this story provides heals our hearts. No matter how much evil prospers, justice will always prevail in the end. That simple worldview of rewarding good and punishing evil gives us the energy to face tomorrow. When you're tired of complex plotlines and difficult themes, why not return to this story? There, you'll find supreme entertainment that you can surrender to without thinking."

A review on tvzuki.com reads, "The return of 'Abarenbo Shogun' after 17 years successfully retained the best aspects of the original series while incorporating new elements and current events. It was also highly entertaining and kept me engaged throughout. I personally thought the cast was excellent. Tatsugoro, Osai, and the old man were perfect, and Nishihata as Ieshige was surprisingly good. Even those who aren't usually interested in period dramas would likely find it enjoyable. This time, Ieshige speaks in a less formal way, making it more accessible for those who struggle with the typical language of period dramas. [...] I'm looking forward to the day when this series is broadcast again."
