= Miss Sherlock =

- ミス・シャーロック
- Genre: Crime drama, Japanese drama
- Based on: Sherlock Holmes by Sir Arthur Conan Doyle
- Screenplay by: Junichi Mori; Marumo Chou; Odani Yudi Ryo; Yousuke Masuike; Miki Oikawa
- Directed by: Junichi Mori; Taki Yusuke; Takashi Matsuo
- Starring: Yūko Takeuchi; Shihori Kanjiya; Kenichi Takitō; Tomoya Nakamura; Ryohei Otani; Yukiyoshi Ozawa; Yuki Saito; Ran Ito
- Composer: Ken'ichirô Suehiro
- Country of origin: Japan
- Original language: Japanese
- No. of seasons: 1
- No. of episodes: 8

Production
- Executive producers: Nagasawa Kazushi; Shinobu Mori; Jonathan Spink; Beibei Fan; Kazuyoshi Ishida
- Cinematography: Hiro'o Yanagida
- Editor: Ryûichi Takita
- Running time: 45-50 minutes
- Production company: Robot Communications

Original release
- Network: Hulu Japan (Japan); HBO (Asia) (international)
- Release: 27 April – 15 June 2018

Miss Sherlock (ミス・シャーロック) is a female-led adaptation of Sir Arthur Conan Doyle's Sherlock Holmes detective stories. The show is primarily set in Tokyo, Japan. It is a co-production between HBO Asia and Hulu Japan. Both the main characters, based on Sherlock Holmes and Dr. John Watson, are played by women, Yuko Takeuchi and Shihori Kanjiya respectively and it is the first major series to cast a woman as Holmes.

== Premise ==
Miss Sherlock depicts "consulting detective" Sara "Sherlock" Shelly Futaba (Yūko Takeuchi) solving various mysteries in modern-day Tokyo. Sherlock is assisted by her flatmate, Dr. Wato Tachibana (Shihori Kanjiya), a doctor who has recently returned from volunteering medical aid in Syria. Because of Sherlock's keen observational and deduction skills, she is frequently asked by Inspector Gentaro Reimon of the Metropolitan Police to help with cases.

Although the series depicts a variety of crimes and perpetrators, Sherlock must deal with the secret organization, Stella Maris, who is behind some of the crimes they solve. Other recurring characters include Kimi Hatano, the landlady where Sherlock lives, and Kento Futaba, the Prime Minister Secretary and Sherlock's older brother.

As the first major series to cast both leads as female, it has received praise for this choice. Yukiyoshi Ozawa, who plays Sherlock's older brother, said "I'm not trying to offend any guys, but some types of guys think very square. Women are more sensitive and know how to touch people's hearts, so they know how to win the game. I think they make better private detectives."

== Cast and characters ==
=== Main ===
- Yūko Takeuchi as Sara "Sherlock" Shelly Futaba, a brilliant yet erratic consulting detective. She frequently is asked by the Metropolitan Police for help with their investigations. The character is based on Sherlock Holmes from the novels.
- Shihori Kanjiya as Dr. Wato ("Wato-san") Tachibana, a doctor who recently returned from volunteering medical aid in Syria. After the hotel she was temporarily staying in burns down, she is forced to move in with Sherlock. The character is based on Dr. Watson from the novels.
- Kenichi Takitō as Inspector Gentaro Reimon, a detective working for the Metropolitan Police Department. The character is based on Inspector Lestrade from the novels.
- Tomoya Nakamura as Sergeant Tatsuya Shibata, a police officer who works under Inspector Reimon. This is an original character.
- Yukiyoshi Ozawa as Kento Futaba, the Prime Minister's Secretary and Sherlock's older brother. He also works in the Cabinet Intelligence and Research Office. The character is based on Mycroft Holmes from the novels.
- Ran Ito as Kimi Hatano, the landlady of Sherlock's building and a family friend of Sherlock. The character is based on Mrs. Hudson from the novels.

=== Recurring ===
- Ryohei Otani as Toru Moriya, a war photographer.
- Yuki Saito as Mariko Irikawa, a psychological counselor who is counseling Wato and Moriya. She is also the main antagonist revealed with an alias "Stella Maris".

=== Additional cast members ===
- Kei Tanaka as Toshio Yoneyama (ep. 3)

== Episodes ==
No.	Title	Directed by	Written by	Original release date
1	"The First Case"	Jun'ichi Mori	Jun'ichi Mori, Amane Marumo, Yôsuke Masaike	27 April 2018
Dr. Tachibana returns from Syria and is greeted by her mentor, Dr. Mizuno, when a remote bomb detonates in his stomach and he dies. Sherlock is asked by the Inspector Reimon to help on the case. Wanting to know the truth behind her mentor's death, Tachibana offers to help Sherlock who reluctantly agrees. Akiko Mizuno, the widow, had received an experimental health tracking pill and modified it to be a remote bomb. She intended to use it as revenge to kill a recently released drug addict who had killed her young daughter. When her husband discovers the large amount of money she spent donating to receive these pills, she is forced to kill him with the pill. Before she can be arrested, she sets off the bomb pill in her own stomach. The hotel where Tachibana was temporarily staying, burns down and she is forced to move in and live with Sherlock.
2	"Sachiko's Mustache"	Jun'ichi Mori	Jun'ichi Mori, Amane Marumo, Mami Oikawa	4 May 2018
Dr. Tachibana struggles with adjusting to living with a demanding Sherlock. A client, Mrs. Mariko Maibara, wants Sherlock to investigate the recent defacement of the painting, "Sachiko", she recently loaned to a museum. Previously, Mrs. Maibara was offered an open offer by art dealer, Keisuke Yanagisawa, which she declined. "Sachiko" is given to Miho Kuwabata to be restored. When visiting him, they discover he is a struggling artist who is still hoping to become famous. Yanagisawa is found dead after falling from his apartment building which appears to be suicide but Sherlock believes it was murder. Mr. Takakura, a wealthy businessman and art collector, had hired Yanagisawa to buy the painting from Mrs. Maibara. But what he really wanted was the frame, made by Stradivari, which was originally made for another painting he owned. Kuwabata switched the real frame with a replica in exchange for supporting his one-man art show by Yanagisawa and then Takakura, neither of whom intended to keep their promise (the former being killed for it). Wato begins to see Dr. Irikawa for counseling.
3	"Lily of the Valley"	Jun'ichi Mori	Jun'ichi Mori, Nobuaki Kotani, Mami Oikawa	11 May 2018
A chief pharmaceutical researcher, Dr. Watanuki, is found in a catatonic state and Sherlock concludes that he had been severely tortured. Years prior, Watanuki developed a drug designed to erase people's fears as part of a government project. Arisa Shiina, a recruiter working for his company, impersonated a newly hired researcher she'd previously interviewed in order to infiltrate restricted areas and steal the data for Watanuki's drug. She then tortured him for information when she could not get through the file's password protection, though he ultimately only revealed part of the password. However, Sherlock figures out that Arisa was actually acting on orders from her younger sister, Yuma, who wants to use the drug to empower victims of abuse. Arisa confronts Sherlock to get her to help them crack the final password while Yuma kidnaps Wato and threatens to electrocute her to death if Sherlock does not cooperate. Sherlock complies, but enters the wrong password on purpose, activating a trap in the file that completely erases all of the data. Yuma nearly kills Wato out of frustration, but she is found and captured by the police in the nick of time. After the sisters' arrest, evidence is found in Yuma's room that seems to link both her and Akiko Mizuno to a mysterious organization called Stella Maris.
4	"The Wakasugi Family Curse"	Jun'ichi Mori	Jun'ichi Mori, Nobuaki Kotani, Yôsuke Masaike	18 May 2018
Wato's childhood friend, Ryota, approaches her for help with a case concerning his family: his wife, Sakura, bit their baby girl's arm. Sakura's mother attributes this strange behavior to an alleged family curse, but the combined efforts of Wato and Sherlock reveal the involvement of the family's young son, Daiki, and an actor named Kaito Yuuki. Kaito blamed Sakura for the death of his fiancé in a car accident and decided to exact revenge by killing her daughter. By impersonating a fictional superhero Daiki liked, he was able to get in contact with the boy through exchanging letters and eventually tricked him into injecting his baby sister with poison. Sakura caught Daiki in the act and bit into the baby's arm to suck the poison out. When Kaito goes to deliver another message and more poison to Daiki, the police are waiting to arrest him. While investigating the case, Wato meets Toru Moriya, a war photographer, and they bond over shared experiences in war zones. Later, while out on an errand, Wato suffers a traumatic flashback related to her time in Syria.
5	"The Missing Bride"	Yûsuke Taki	Jun'ichi Mori, Nobuaki Kotani, Amane Marumo, Yôsuke Masaike	25 May 2018
Dr. Irikawa diagnoses Wato with PTSD. Wato also continues meeting with Moriya and confides in both him and Dr. Irikawa about her flashbacks. Sherlock and Wato are sent to investigate the disappearance of Risa Mashima, who was last seen on her wedding day. The groom, Kazuma Saeki, was a world-famous jewelry designer. However, Kazuma had actually stolen all of his award-winning designs from their true creator, Miku Nishino. Two years prior, Kazuma killed Miku and took her sketchbooks when she turned down his offers to collaborate. Risa, Miku's longtime best friend, quickly realized what Kazuma had done and dated him in order to get close to him and find evidence of his crimes. Eventually, she is finally able to bait Kazuma into revealing himself, after which he is promptly arrested by Inspector Reimon. Meanwhile, Yuma Shiina commits suicide by hanging herself in her prison cell.
6	"Stella Maris"	Yûsuke Taki	Jun'ichi Mori, Nobuaki Kotani, Yôsuke Masaike	1 June 2018
A politician's son receives a severed ear and finger in the mail from an unknown sender and Sherlock and Wato are assigned to help figure out who sent them and why. The body parts are found to belong to two members of the police force, but they are adorned with accessories that were not theirs. These instead were once owned by a young woman who was the victim of a hit-and-run five years prior. The perpetrator, politician Koichi Takayama, used his influence to cover up the incident. When the victim's father, Yoshiyuki Takai, learned the truth, he killed the detective and forensic scientist involved and sent their severed body parts to Takayama as a warning; the packages were mistakenly thought to have been addressed to his son instead due to Takai slightly miswriting the katakana in his name. Sherlock and Wato go to Takayama's house to confront him about the hit-and-run, but as they chase him down, they find his son lying in the road mortally wounded. Yoshiyuki Takai reveals himself as the assailant and slits his own throat before he can be arrested. Not long afterward, Arisa Shiina begins to divulge more information about Stella Maris while evidence found in Takai's house also links him to the organization, which Sherlock begins to suspect is actually a person named Akira Moriwaki.
7	"Stolen Virus"	Takashi Matsuo	Jun'ichi Mori, Amane Marumo, Mami Oikawa	8 June 2018
Wato and Moriya begin dating. Samples of a deadly virus are stolen from a private institution called Teinichi Chemical. The researcher who stole them later turns up dead while his fiancé, Mitsuki Kurata, has been infected and left in an abandoned building. When she is found, Kurata immediately identifies Sherlock as the culprit. In actuality, Kurata had faked her own kidnapping and forced her fiancé to steal the virus as ransom. After killing him to take the samples, she infected herself and falsely accused Sherlock to prevent her from intervening. Sherlock confronts her on the roof of a hospital, where Kurata reveals a plan to unleash the virus on all of Tokyo if Teinichi Chemical does not confess to their shady dealings with terrorist groups during an upcoming press conference. Kurata then jumps to her death while making it seem as if Sherlock had pushed her, further incriminating the detective. With the police focused on finding Sherlock and Teinichi Chemical refusing to confess, Sherlock is forced to continue her search for the virus alone. She learns that Kurata had been working together with none other than Moriya and rushes to intercept him. By the time she does, Moriya has already infected himself and Sherlock is forced to shoot him to prevent him from spreading the virus just as the police and Wato arrive on the scene. Wato is left devastated and Sherlock breaks down over her actions. Through a video Moriya recorded shortly before his death, Sherlock learns that Akira Moriwaki, aka Stella Maris, is Wato's counselor Dr. Irikawa. Meanwhile, Dr. Irikawa approaches a grieving Wato and asks the latter to accompany her.
8	"The Dock"	Yûsuke Taki	Jun'ichi Mori, Nobuaki Kotani, Amane Marumo, Mami Oikawa	15 June 2018
The Metropolitan Police conducts a manhunt for Sherlock, cutting the detective off from her allies and forcing her into hiding as she tries to figure out Wato's whereabouts and Dr. Irikawa's next move. Dr. Irikawa takes Wato to her secret facility known as the Dock and begins brainwashing her to turn her against Sherlock. After having a brief confrontation with Dr. Irikawa and breaking into her office, Sherlock discovers that she intends to locate the specs of a miniature nuclear warhead and have Wato unleash it. Sherlock finds the specs inside the designer's prison cell by revealing plans he'd written on the walls in blood before his death, then obscures the writing so that Dr. Irikawa cannot see it. She agrees to meet Dr. Irikawa on a skyscraper rooftop to exchange the warhead specs for Wato's safe return, but Wato, still under the effects of Irikawa's brainwashing, arrives at the meeting and holds Sherlock at gunpoint. Sherlock manages to talk Wato down long enough for her to hesitate, then tackles Dr. Irikawa over the roof, sending both women falling down the side of the building. Wato deeply mourns Sherlock's supposed death as she moves out of the flat they shared, though the episode ends with Wato being approached from behind by a familiar figure clad in a trench coat and heels.

== Reception ==
Kate Burtyl of Den of Geek rated the show 3.5/5 and called it "worth a watch for any fan of Sherlock Holmes, Sherlock, or international TV." Kevin Yeoman of Screen Rant praised the relationship between the two leads and called the show "a satisfying binge-watch for HBO subscribers." Kristina Manente of Polygon recommended the show and said "Self-professed Sherlockians dig Miss Sherlock. Global audiences dig Miss Sherlock. And if you don’t mind ditching the deerstalker, you might love Miss Sherlock, too."
