= Kiyotaka Mitsugi =

Japanese actor (born 1953)

Kiyotaka Mitsugi (三ツ木 清隆, Mitsugi Kiyotaka; born May 30, 1953) is a Japanese actor and singer. His career has centered on television, in the genres of tokusatsu and jidaigeki.

== Biography ==
Mitsugi was born on May 30, 1953, in Ichikawa, Chiba Prefecture. He graduated from Wakō Gakuen High School.

He debuted in 1967 after being selected to portray the protagonist Azuma Hikaru in the television series Kōsoku Esper through 1967 to 1968. He starred in the 1973 series Shirojishi Kamen, and played a supporting role as the ninja Saizō in Series III, Episodes 1–57, of Abarenbō Shōgun. He played a supporting role as ZAT team member Nishida in the Ultraman Taro series.

In NHK's eleventh Taiga drama, Kunitori Monogatari, Mitsugi portrayed Akechi Mitsuharu. He appeared regularly in Episodes 436–509 of Tokusō Saizensen.

A frequent guest actor, he made six appearances on Ōedo Sōsamō and four on Zenigata Heiji, three on Taiyō ni Hoero!', and two on Happyaku Yachō Yume Nikki. Fans of the tokusatsu Chikyuu Sentai Fiveman know him as Dr. Hoshikawa. The producers of Abarenbō Shōgun selected him to reprise his role in the 500th episode special, and again to portray the daimyō Tokugawa Munenao in Series VI.

Outside drama series, his career includes other media and genres. In film, Mitsugi has three credits. He was a guest voice in an episode of the animated 1979 television show Takarajima. He has acted in stage productions in the 1970s, 1980s, and 1990s.

A vocalist, Mitsugi has released nine single recordings and one album.
