= Morooka =

Morooka (written: 師岡 or 諸岡) is a Japanese surname. Notable people with the surname include:

- Hiroto Morooka (諸岡 裕人, born 1997), Japanese footballer
- Kōji Morooka (師岡 宏次, 1914–1991), Japanese photographer

== Fictional characters ==
- Kinshiro Morooka (諸岡 金四郎), a character in the video game Persona 4
- Takuya Morooka (師岡 卓也), a character in the visual novel Maji de Watashi ni Koi Shinasai!
