= Ryō Tamura =

Ryō Tamura may refer to:

- Ryō Tamura (actor) (born 1946)
- Ryō Tamura (comedian) (born 1972)
