= Team Batista no Eikō =

2008 Japanese film and TV show

Team Batista no Eikō (チーム·バチスタの栄光, The Glorious Team Batista) is a Japanese mystery film and television show adapted from the best-selling novel of the same name by Takeru Kaidō. The story revolves around a hospital with a team of doctors known for their success with a type of heart surgery. After a series of failed operations that result in the patient's death, an internal investigation is initiated, led by a doctor named Taguchi and a brash government official. In the original novel the main character Taguchi, was a male doctor in his forties. However, for the film adaptation TBS suggested replacing the character with a young female resulting in Yūko Takeuchi being cast as in the role. For the TV show, Taguchi is a man, with Atsushi Itō playing the role.

== Plot ==
A top notch seven-member team of doctors and nurses known as “Team Batista” are Tojo University Hospital’s pride and joy. The medical team performs a prominent heart surgery known as the Batista Operation which has a normal 60% success rate, but the team has consecutively pulled off twenty six successful surgeries. However, the streak is broken after a string of three procedures end in their patients' deaths. Consequently, an internal investigation is launched with hospital therapist Kohei Taguchi in charge of uncovering the truth behind the incidents. When Taguchi is unable to find any definitive information, the deaths are labeled as unexplainable accidents. The evaluation is subsequently dismissed by Keisuke Shiratori, an investigator with the Ministry of Health, Labour and Welfare, who re-launches the investigation on the basis that the deaths were actually murders.

== Film ==
The Glorious Team Batista
- Directed by: Yoshihiro Nakamura
- Written by: Hiroshi Saitō; Mitsuharu Makita
- Produced by: Yasuhiro Mase; Kanjirō Sakura; Akihiro Yamauchi
- Starring: Yūko Takeuchi; Hiroshi Abe
- Cinematography: Yasushi Sasakibara
- Edited by: Hirohide Abe
- Music by: Naoki Satō
- Distributed by: Toho
- Release date: February 9, 2008
- Running time: 118 minutes
- Country: Japan
- Language: Japanese
- Box office: ¥1.6 billion JPY

The film is based on an award-winning novel and its popularity resulted in roughly 25 movie studios and television networks fighting over adaptation rights, in the end TBS won out. The novel was adapted for the screen by Hiroshi Saitō and Mitsuharu Makita. The film began shooting October 7, 2008 and was primarily shot in Tokyo. The Glorious Team Batista was in theaters on February 9, 2008 and became a commercial success, grossing 264 million yen from 284 screens its opening weekend.

When The Glorious Team Batista was screened at the Udine Far East Film Festival, it received mediocre reviews. Todd Brown of Twitch wrote:

"The characters are stock at best, the story arc blandly predictable and the ending drawn out beyond reasonable bounds. The technical end is solid and the performances good enough but the script for this just feels far more like a lengthy episode of prime time network television from the pre-HBO era – much more Murder She Wrote or Matlock than Dexter – than it feels like the feature film – adapted from a popular mystery novel – that it is. Horrible? No, just horribly bland."

Similarly, Ross Chen of Love HK Film wrote:

"...The Glorious Team Batista is a ragingly obvious commercial film, with manufactured characters, drama, and situations that seem ripped from a pulpy bestseller you might find featured in an airport bookstore (Surprise! The film is based on a novel.). This is a big-screen medical thriller built for mainstream audiences, and it seldom delivers anything beyond the required or expected... Regardless, the whole is too glossy and commercial to be anymore more than an average medical thriller suited to undemanding audiences."

A sequel to the film titled The Triumphant Return of General Rouge was released March 7, 2009. The sequel adapted from "General Rouge no Gaisen," which is the third book in the same novel series as "Team Batista." Yūko Takeuchi and Hiroshi Abe reprised their roles, with director Yoshihiro Nakamura also returning. Masato Sakai was cast as the film's antagonist.

=== Cast ===
- Yūko Takeuchi – Kimiko Taguchi
- Hiroshi Abe – Keisuke Shiratori
- Koji Kikkawa – Kyoichi Kiryu
- Hiroyuki Ikeuchi – Ryo Narumi
- Tetsuji Tamayama – Toshiki Sakai
- Haruka Igawa – Naomi Otomo
- Hiromasa Taguchi – Takayuki Haba
- Naoki Tanaka – Kōichirō Himuro
- Shiro Sano – Yuji Kakitani
- Yōko Nogiwa – Makoto Fujiwara
- Sei Hiraizumi – Seiichiro Kurosaki
- Jun Kunimura – Gonta Takashina

== TV Show ==
Team Batista no Eikō
- Genre: Medical Drama, Mystery
- Starring: Atsushi Itō; Tōru Nakamura
- Ending theme: Mamoritai Mono (Thelma Aoyama)
- Composers: Kei Haneoka; Takeshi Senō
- Original language: Japanese
- No. of episodes: 11

Production
- Producers: Yoko Toyofuku; Kōichi Toda; Kaoru Yamaki
- Production location: Tokyo
- Running time: 54 min./episode

Original release
- Network: Fuji TV
- Release: October 14 – December 23, 2008

=== Cast ===
- Atsushi Itō – Kōhei Taguchi
- Tōru Nakamura – Keisuke Shiratori
- Tsuyoshi Ihara – Kyoichi Kiryu
- Daisuke Miyagawa – Ryo Narumi
- Hiroki Suzuki – Toshiki Sakai
- Yumiko Shaku – Naomi Otomo
- Masahiro Toda – Takayuki Haba
- Yū Shirota – Kōichirō Himuro
- Shingo Tsurumi – Yūji Kakitani
- Yuko Natori – Makoto Fujiwara
- Ryuzo Hayashi – Kenta Takashina
- Mayumi Asaka – Kanako Miyahara
- Takaaki Enoki – Ichirō Kurosaki
- Chika Uemura – Kyoko Hoshino
- Akio Yokoyama – Shuzo Taguchi
- Risa Saiki – Midori Taguchi
- Mikeo Ishii – Akane Taguchi
- Kaoru Okunuki – Kishikawa Marie
- Houka Kinoshita – Tamotsu Kishikawa

=== Episodes ===
No.	Title	Directed by	Written by	Original release date
1	"Puzzle ~Medical malpractice? Murder?!~" "Nazo ~Iryō Misu ka? Satsujin ka!?~" (謎 医療ミスか? 殺人か!?)	Noriko Goto	Hisashi Ueda	October 14, 2008
2	"Rumour ~Active Phase (Active Investigation) vs Passive Phase (Passive Investigation)~" "Uwasa ~Akutivu.Fēzu (Nōdō-teki Chōsa) VS Passhivu.Fēzu (Judō-teki Chōsa)~" (噂 アクティヴ·フェーズ(能動的調査) VS パッシヴ·フェーズ(受動的調査))	Noriko Goto	Hisashi Ueda	October 21, 2008
3	"Bond ~Anesthesiologist's confession~" "Kizuna ~Masuikai no Kokukaku~" (絆 麻酔科医の告白)	Noriko Goto	Kazuhisa Imai	October 28, 2008
4	"Gaze ~Elite's pride and weakness~" "Mochi ~Erīto no Puraido to Jakuten~" (望 エリートのプライドと弱点)	Noriko Goto	Kazuhisa Imai	November 4, 2008
5	"Love ~With a criminal's motive~" "Koi ~Han'nin no Meboshi wa Tsuita~" (恋 犯人の目星はついた)	Noriko Goto	Hisashi Ueda	November 11, 2008
6	"Absolute crime in the operating room... You are the perpetrator" "Ope-shitsu no Kanzen Hanzai... Han'nin wa Omaeda" (オペ室の完全犯罪...犯人はお前だ)	Noriko Goto	Hisashi Ueda	November 18, 2008
7	"Real criminal appears ~Wrong deduction... the real criminal appears!~" "Shinhan'nin Tōjō ~Machigatte Ita Suiri... Shinhan'nin Tōjō!~" (真犯人登場 間違っていた推理...真犯人登場!)	Noriko Goto	Kazuhisa Imai	November 25, 2008
8	"Quivering scalpel ~Rifts between brothers-in-law... Abnormal occurrence during the operation!~" "Furueru Mesu ~Gikyōdai no Kiretsu... Ope de Ijō Jitai!~" (震えるメス 義兄弟の亀裂...オペで異常事態!)	Noriko Goto	Kazunari Hoshino	December 2, 2008
9	"False alibi and fatal mistake" "Nise Aribai to Chimei-teki Misu" (偽アリバイと致命的ミス)	Noriko Goto	Hisashi Ueda	December 9, 2008
10	"Final puzzle solving...This is the medical trick!!" "Saigo no Nazotoki.... Iryō Torikku wa Kore da!!" (最後の謎解き…医療トリックはコレだ!!)	Noriko Goto	Kazuhisa Imai	December 16, 2008
11	"Absolute crime in only 3 seconds!!The most dangerous operation starts right now" "Wazuka 3-byō no Kanzen Hanzai!! Ima, Mottomo Kiken'na Ope ga Hajimaru" (わずか3秒の完全犯罪!!今、最も危険なオペが始まる)	Noriko Goto	Hisashi Ueda	December 23, 2008
