= Yuko Takeuchi =

Japanese actress (1980–2020)

Yūko Takeuchi
- 竹内 結子
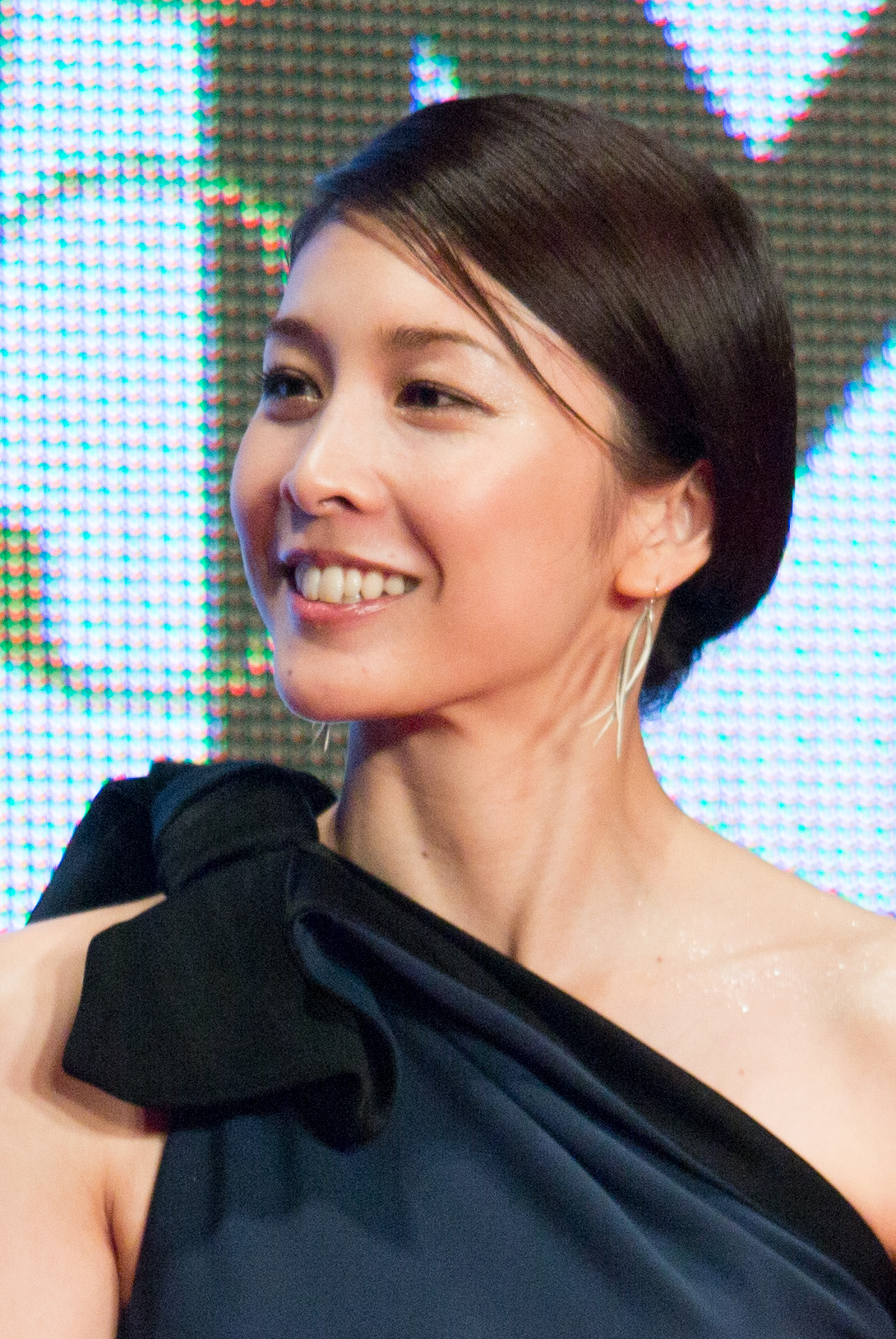
- Takeuchi at the 28th Tokyo International Film Festival, 2015
- Born: 1 April 1980; Urawa, Saitama, Japan
- Died: 27 September 2020 (aged 40); Tokyo, Japan
- Occupation: Actress
- Years active: 1996–2020
- Agent: Stardust Promotion
- Spouses: Nakamura Shidō II (m. 2005; div. 2008); Taiki Nakabayashi (m. 2019)
- Children: 2

Yūko Takeuchi (竹内 結子, Takeuchi Yūko; 1 April 1980 – 27 September 2020) was a Japanese actress. She is known for her roles in television series Asuka (1999), Pride (2004), FlashForward (2009), and Miss Sherlock (2018) as well as films such as Ring (1998), Yomigaeri (2003), and Dog in a Sidecar (2007).

== Life and career ==
Yuko Takeuchi was born on 1 April 1980 in Urawa, Saitama, Japan. She was "discovered" during spring break in Harajuku after junior high school.

Takeuchi was married to Shidō Nakamura II (who had co-starred with Takeuchi in the film Be with You) from 10 May 2005 until their divorce on 29 February 2008. She had a son with Nakamura who was born in November 2005. Prior to the couple's divorce, Nakamura had apologized for a drunk driving incident where he was with actress Aya Okamoto and later seen with actress Saki Takaoka. After the drunk driving incident, Takeuchi reportedly moved to live in her management office shortly before filing for divorce in October 2006.

Takeuchi married actor Taiki Nakabayashi on 27 February 2019. Her son, in junior high school at the time was reported to have actively encouraged her second marriage. In November 2019, she announced she was pregnant and gave birth to her second son in January 2020.

Takeuchi was known for her earlier roles, starring in Japanese television dramas such as Mukodono (My Husband), The Queen of Lunchtime Cuisine, Egao No Hōsoku, and Pride, as well as NHK's Asadora television series Asuka. In the romantic comedies Mukodono, she and Nagase Tomoya played newlyweds and in The Queen of Lunchtime Cuisine, she played a girl with a mysterious past who loves her lunch. In the drama Egao no Hōsoku, her character experiences meeting new people while supporting a manga writer and in Pride, her character is the love interest of a hockey player portrayed by Takuya Kimura.

Takeuchi's earlier films include Hoshi Ni Negaiwo, Yomigaeri, and Be with You (Ima, Ai ni Yukimasu). Her performances in Yomigaeri (2003), Be with You (2004), and Spring Snow (2005) were recognized by the Japanese Academy Awards. She later won the Best Supporting Actress Award at the Japanese Academy Awards for her role in the 2014 film Cape Nostalgia.

In 2010, Takeuchi appeared on the science fiction American TV serial FlashForward in two episodes (as a character portrayed in five). Director Michael Nankin called her "Japan's answer to Audrey Hepburn." Takeuchi's dialogue was in Japanese, but she said the experience caused her to make it a goal to master English as she wished she had been able to communicate better with the other cast members and crew.

In 2018, Takeuchi portrayed the titular character in Hulu/HBO Asia series Miss Sherlock, an adaptation of Arthur Conan Doyle's Sherlock Holmes detective stories.

== Death ==
On 27 September 2020 at 2:00 a.m. (JST), Takeuchi was found hanged at her home in Shibuya, Tokyo. She was taken to the hospital, but died shortly afterwards. No suicide note was found. She was 40 years old.

== Filmography ==
=== Film ===
Year	Title	Role	Notes
1998	Innocent World	Ami	
1998	Ring	Tomoko Oishi	
1999	Big Show! Sing in Hawaii	Satomi Takahashi	
2003	Night of the Shooting Star	Kana Aoshima	
2003	Yomigaeri	Aoi Tachibana	
2004	Heaven's Bookstore – The Light of Love	Shoko Hiyama / Kanako Nagase	
2004	Be with You	Mio Aio	
2005	Spring Snow	Satoko Ayakura	
2007	A Dog on Sidecar	Yōko	
2007	The World According to Chocolat	Chocolat	
2007	Closed Note	Ibuki Mano	
2007	Midnight Eagle	Keiko Arisawa	
2008	The Glorious Team Batista	Kimiko Taguchi	
2009	The Triumphant of General Rouge	Kimiko Taguchi	
2009	No More Cry	Tetsuko Yamagishi	
2010	Golden Slumbers	Haruko Higuchi	
2010	Flowers	Kaoru	
2011	1,778 Stories of Me and My Wife	Setsuko	
2011	A Ghost of a Chance		
2011	Hayabusa	Megumi	20th Century Fox
2014	Cape Nostalgia		
2016	Creepy	Yasuko Takakura	
2016	The Magnificent Nine	Toki	
2016	The Inerasable	I	
2018	The Travelling Cat Chronicles		
2019	The Confidence Man JP: The Movie		
2019	A Long Goodbye		
2019	The 47 Ronin in Debt	Riku	
2020	The Confidence Man JP: Episode of the Princess		

=== Television ===
- Cyborg (1996 Fuji TV)
- Nice Guy (1997 Fuji TV)
- Shin-D (1997 NTV)
- Frozen Summer (1998 NTV) as Junko Moriguchi
- Setsunai (1998 TV Asahi)
- Dangerous Police Forever (1998 NTV) as Asuka Fubuki
- Kantaro Terauchi's Family in autumn 1998 (1998 TBS) as Misuzu Kawachi
- Nanisama (1998 TBS) as Yuri Kimura
- Romance (1999 NTV) as Kotoe Kurasawa
- Asuka (1999 NHK Asadora) as Asuka Miyamoto
- Friends (2000 TBS) as Miyuki Matsuno
- Stories of 100 Years in episode 2 (2000 TBS) as Toshiko Nagai
- Style! (2000 TV Asahi) as Shiori Sakakibara
- A White Shadow (2001 TBS) as Noriko Shimura
- Mukodono! (2001 Fuji TV) as Sakura Arai
- School Teacher (2001 TBS) as Motoko Asakura
- The Queen of Lunchtime Cuisine (2002 Fuji TV) as Natsumi Mugita
- The Law of the Smile (2003 TBS) as Yumi Kurasawa
- Autumn in Warsaw (2003 YTV) as Yoko Aoki
- Pride (2004 Fuji TV) as Aki Murase
- New York Love Story (2004 Fuji TV) as Eiko Fujikura
- Fukigen na Jiin (The Selfish Gene) (2005) as Yoshiko Aoi
- Bara no nai Hanaya (2008) as Miou Shirato
- FlashForward (2009 ABC) as Keiko Arahida
- Natsu no Koi wa Nijiiro ni Kagayaku (2010) as Shiori Kitamura
- Strawberry Night (2012) as Reiko Himekawa
- cheap flight (2013)
- Sanada Maru (2016 NHK) as Yodo-dono
- Kamoshirenai Joyū tachi (2016 Fuji TV) as herself
- A Life (2017 TBS) as Mifuyu Danjō
- Miss Sherlock (2018 Hulu, HBO) as Sara "Sherlock" Shelly Futaba (Sherlock Holmes)
- Innocent Days (2018 Wowow) as Yukino Tanaka
- Queen (2019 Fuji TV)

=== Other ===
==== Narrator ====
- Wonderful Spaceship Earth (2002 TV Asahi)
- If the World is 100 Villages 6 (2009 TV Fuji)
- The Nonfiction (2010 TV Fuji)
- Eko's manners (2011 BS Asahi)

==== Dubbing roles ====
- Inside Out – Joy (Amy Poehler)
- Titanic (2001 Fuji TV edition) – Rose DeWitt Bukater (Kate Winslet)

== Works ==
=== Essay ===
- Nioi Fechi (2004 Pia)
- Nioi Fechi 2 calorie off (2006 Pia)

=== Photo essay ===
- Tabibon (travel diary of Tahiti) (2007 SDP)

=== Supplies-of-provisions catalog ===
- Takeuchi Marche

=== Single ===
- Tada Kaze Wa Fukukara (1998 Pony Canyon)

== Awards and nominations ==
Year	Award	Category	Work(s)	Result	Ref.
2002	26th Elan d'or Awards	Newcomer of the Year	Herself	Won	
2002	6th Nikkan Sports Drama Grand Prix	Best Actress	The Queen of Lunchtime Cuisine	Won	
2003	7th Nikkan Sports Drama Grand Prix	Best Actress	Pride	Won	
2004	27th Japan Academy Film Prize	Best Actress	Yomigaeri	Nominated	
2005	28th Japan Academy Film Prize	Best Actress	Be with You	Nominated	
2006	29th Japan Academy Film Prize	Best Actress	Spring Snow	Nominated	
2007	20th Nikkan Sports Film Awards	Best Actress	Dog in a Sidecar	Won	
