= Ritsuko Nemoto =

Japanese actress (born 1959)

Ritsuko Nemoto (根本 りつ子, Nemoto Ritsuko, born April 19, 1959 in Tokyo) is a Japanese actress. From 1983 to 1996, she portrayed the nurse Shiho in Series 7–14 of the long-running prime-time series Ōoka Echizen on the nationwide Tokyo Broadcasting System network. A frequent guest star in jidaigeki roles, she has seven appearances in Mito Kōmon to her credit. Contemporary roles include parts in a 2004 television series spinoff of Castle of Sand and the 1985 Star Tanjō. Ritsuko also acts in two-hour mystery dramas, with roles in the Monday, Wednesday and Saturday prime-time slots.

Ritsuko has appeared in two films. She was in the 1994 Natsu no Niwa: The Friends, directed by Shinji Sōmai and in the 2005 Semi Shigure, directed by Mitsuo Kurotsuchi.

Her product endorsements include advertisements for Calpis, House Foods, and Lake (Shinsei Financial Co., Ltd.).
