= Ken Matsudaira =

Japanese actor and musician (born 1953)

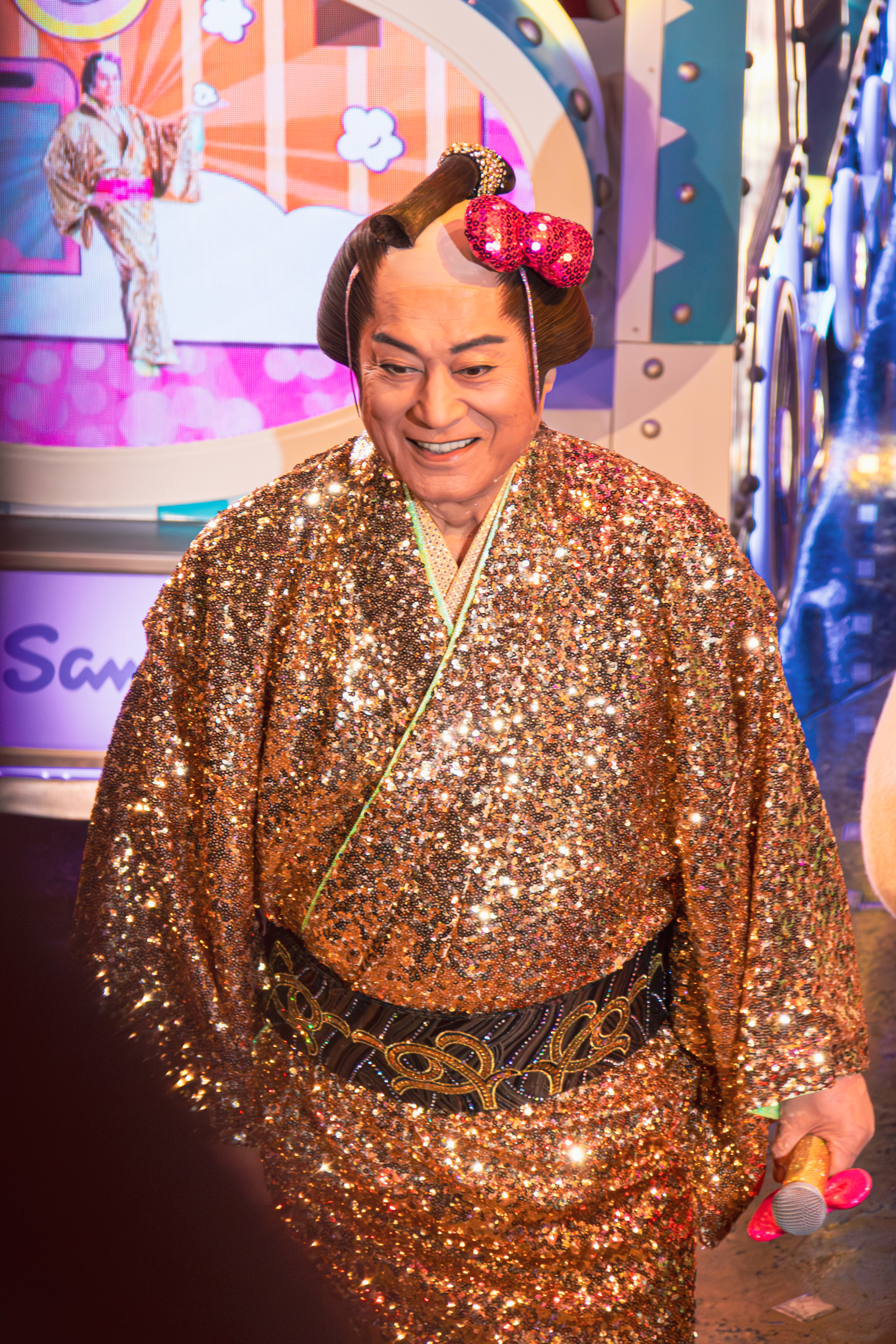
- Matsudaira in 2026
- Born: Sueshichi Suzuki; November 28, 1953 (age 72); Toyohashi, Aichi, Japan
- Other name: Matsuken
- Occupation: actor
- Years active: 1974 – present
- Spouses: Mao Daichi (m. 1990; div. 2004); Yuri Matsumoto (m. 2005; died 2010)
- Website: http://www.ken-matsudaira.com/

Ken Matsudaira (松平 健, Matsudaira Ken; familiarly shortened as Matsuken, born November 28, 1953) is a Japanese actor and musician from Toyohashi, Aichi, Japan. His real name is Sueshichi Suzuki (鈴木 末七, Suzuki Sueshichi).

== Career ==
In 1974, he joined Shintaro Katsu's production company and made his debut with the television series Zatoichi as a guest. For a quarter of a century, he starred in the series The Unfettered Shogun as Tokugawa Yoshimune, the title character. He also played a similar role in Kamen Rider OOO Wonderful.

Other noteworthy roles include Hōjō Yoshitoki in the 1979 NHK series Kusa Moeru, Irobe Matashiro in the 1999 NHK series Genroku Ryoran (involving the chushingura, that is, the story of the Forty-seven rōnin), Shibata Katsuie in the 2002 NHK series Toshiie to Matsu, Ōtomo Sōrin in the 2004 NHK special Ōtomo Sōrin—Kokoro no Ōkoku wo Motomete, and Ōishi Kuranosuke in the 2004 TV Asahi series Chushingura. He also played Asano Takumi no Kami, an important (although brief) role, in an earlier chushingura, making a career of that story. In 2005, he appeared as Benkei in Yoshitsune, the yearlong NHK Taiga drama. TV Asahi tapped Matsudaira to star as Tōyama no Kin-san in the (2007) version of their program of the same name. He appeared in Tokugawa Fūun-roku, the annual jidaigeki spectacular which was shown on TV Tokyo on January 2, 2008.

=== Matsuken Samba ===
Matsudaira is also famous as a singer. His most popular song "Matsuken Samba II" (マツケンサンバII) was released in 2004 and became popular with his fanbase. The song gained national attention because his appearance in the likeness of a person in Edo period with glittery kimono and a hip-swiveling dance became the topic of some television programs, including parodying him on an idol group SMAP's variety show, SMAP×SMAP. The new attention of the media made Matsudaira visible to a younger fanbase. The song became a certified hit, staying on the Oricon Top 100 chart for over a year. A version called Te o Tsunagou ~Matsuken × Kamen Rider Samba~ (手をつなごう～マツケン×仮面ライダーサンバ～, Te o Tsunagou ~Matsuken × Kamen Raidā Sanba~) featuring Shu Watanabe (Eiji Hino/Kamen Rider OOO) and Ryosuke Miura (Ankh/Shingo Izumi) was released on August 3, 2011, as an ending theme for the movie Kamen Rider OOO Wonderful: The Shogun and the 21 Core Medals.

== Filmography ==
=== Television ===
- The Unfettered Shogun (1978–2003), Tokugawa Yoshimune
- Akō Rōshi (1979), Asano "Takumi no Kami" Naganori
- Kusa Moeru (1979), Hōjō Yoshitoki
- Taira no Kiyomori (1992), Taira no Kiyomori
- Unmeitōge (1993), Akizuki Rokurota
- Benkei (1997), Musashibō Benkei
- Toshiie and Matsu (2002), Shibata Katsuie
- Yoshitsune (2005), Musashibō Benkei
- Samurai Rebellion (2013)
- Naotora: The Lady Warlord (2017), Takeda Shingen
- The 13 Lords of the Shogun (2022), Taira no Kiyomori
- Onihei Hankachō: Honjo Sakura-yashiki (2024)
- Omusubi (2024–25), Eikichi Yoneda
- Shin Abarenbō Shōgun (2025), Tokugawa Yoshimune
- Mt. Fuji Erupts: Are We Prepared? (2026), Eiji

=== Film ===
- Strawberry Road (1991), Hisa Ishii
- The Ode to Joy (2006)
- Kamen Rider OOO Wonderful: The Shogun and the 21 Core Medals (2011), Tokugawa Yoshimune
- Sanada 10 Braves (2016), Tokugawa Ieyasu
- Musashi (2019), Sasaki Kojirō

=== Theatrical animation ===
- Doraemon: Nobita's Secret Gadget Museum (2013), Mustard
- Her Blue Sky (2019), Dankichi Nitobe

=== Television animation ===
- Rowdy Sumo Wrestler Matsutaro!! (2014), Matsutarō Sakaguchi

=== Video games ===
- Kamen Rider: Battride War 2 (2014), Tokugawa Yoshimune

=== Japanese dub ===
- X-Men: Apocalypse (2016), Apocalypse (Oscar Isaac)
- Wonka (2023), Lofty (Hugh Grant)

== Awards ==
| Year | Award | Category | Work(s) | Result | Ref(s) |
|---|---|---|---|---|---|
| 1980 | 4th Elan d'or Awards | Newcomer of the Year | Himself | Won | |
