= 24th Yokohama Film Festival =

2003 film festival in Yokohama, Japan

- Location: Kannai Hall, Yokohama, Kanagawa, Japan
- Founded: 1980
- Festival date: 2 February 2003

The 24th Yokohama Film Festival (第24回ヨコハマ映画祭) was held on 2 February 2003 in Kannai Hall, Yokohama, Kanagawa, Japan.

== Awards ==
- Best Film: Hush!
- Best Actor:
  - Seiichi Tanabe – Hush!
  - Kyōzō Nagatsuka – The Laughing Frog
- Best Actress: Asaka Seto – Travail
- Best Supporting Actor: Shinya Tsukamoto – Travail, Ichi the Killer, Kuroe
- Best Supporting Actress: Nene Otsuka – The Laughing Frog, Utsutsu
- Best Director:
  - Ryosuke Hashiguchi – Hush!
  - Hideyuki Hirayama – The Laughing Frog, Out
- Best New Director: Fumihiko Sori – Ping Pong
- Best Screenplay: Kentarō Ōtani – Travail
- Best Cinematography: Kōzō Shibasaki – Out, The Laughing Frog
- Best New Talent:
  - Masahiro Hisano – Sorry
  - Yukika Sakuratani – Sorry
  - Mikako Ichikawa – Travail

== Best 10 ==
1. Hush!
2. Out
3. The Twilight Samurai
4. KT
5. Travail
6. Sorry
7. The Laughing Frog
8. Ping Pong
9. Harmful Insect
10. Hikari no Ame

runner-up: Ichi the Killer
