= Who Will Know =

Song by Shiro Sagisu

from the album Shin Godzilla
- Label: King
- Composer: Shiro Sagisu
- Lyricist: Mike Wyzgowski

Audio sample
- file; help

"Who Will Know" is a song composed in 2016 by Shiro Sagisu for the soundtrack of the 2016 Godzilla film, Shin Godzilla. The song is the 13th track. Instrumental sounds and tuning were done by the London Studio Orchestra in 2016.

One reviewer suggested the song describes the constant agony experienced by Shin Godzilla from radiation and mutations, resulting from his nuclear waste origin.

== Other versions ==
The CD release of Shin Godzilla's soundtrack features a slightly different version than what plays in the movie itself, having a unique intro to the version included in the film, with the film version leaning into string instruments, whilst the original version started with flutes. The song also received an instrumental version as a bonus track on the CD release, this version was completely leaning into string instruments.

During a live concert, a live version of "Who Will Know" was performed by Yoko Takahashi for the Shin Godzilla vs. Evangelion Symphony in 2017. It became the ninth song of the ten on Disc 2. Whilst two additional versions of "Who Will Know" were created during 2017, a Furusato version, and a Snedronningen version.

=== All versions ===
All versions of this song include:

- Who Will Know (24 Bigslow) - The song played in Shin Godzilla during the atomic breath scene.
- Who Will Know (24 Bigslow strings) - The string version of the song with just the string instruments.
- Who Will Know (Furusato) - The 2017 version sung by Yoko Takahashi with mostly Japanese lyrics.
- Who Will Know (Snedronningen) - An alternative version of the Furusato version
- Who Will Know (Tragedy) - The extended version of the song, often known to be the Japanese version of the 24 Bigslow version.
