= Shin Godzilla (character) =

Fictional monster, or kaiju

- Godzilla character
- Shin Godzilla's fourth form (Kamakura-san) as portrayed by Mansai Nomura via motion capture in Shin Godzilla
- First appearance: Shin Godzilla (2016)
- Designed by: Mahiro Maeda; Takayuki Takeya
- Motion capture: Mansai Nomura

In-universe information
- Aliases: Shin Gojira; Shin Godzilla (Note: Shinnosuke calls this Godzilla specimen "Shin Godzilla" in the episode 901 Shinnosuke vs. Shin Godzilla (2016))
- Species: Mutated marine animal
- Gender: Unspecified
- Origin: Tokyo Bay
- Forms: Kamata-Kun; Shinagawa-Kun; Kamakura-San

Shin Godzilla (/ʃɪnˈɡɒdˈzɪlə/ shin-ɡod-ZIL-ə) (Note: Japanese: シン・ゴジラ, Hepburn: Shin Gojira; IPA: [shinꜜɡoꜜʑiɾa]) is a giant monster, or kaiju, in Toho Co., Ltd.'s Godzilla media franchise. An iteration of Godzilla, it first appeared in the 2016 reboot film of the same name, released by Toho and co-directed by Hideaki Anno and Shinji Higuchi.

He is an ever-evolving lifeform that was mutated by radioactive waste dumped by the United States in Tokyo Bay in the late 1950s. Capable of spontaneously adapting to different situations, Shin Godzilla came ashore in Tokyo in 2016 and immediately caused havoc, with weapons from the Japanese Self Defense Force (JSDF) and the United States Air Force (USAF) having no effect on him. He was subdued, but could not be killed, and remained a potential threat as he stood frozen in the ruins of Tokyo.

While the character is never referred to as "Shin Godzilla" in the film, the name was given in official merchandise following the film's release in 2016. He is referred to by both the katakana "Gojira" and its English translation "Godzilla" interchangeably in the film.

== Overview ==
=== Development ===
Shin Godzilla's various forms were done through CGI, while the fourth form was also portrayed via motion capture by actor Mansai Nomura. A bluescreen prop of Shin Godzilla's second form was made for a shot against two miniature buildings for the Kamata attack. An animatronic puppet of Shin Godzilla's upper body was created for close-up shots of Shin's fourth form, but this puppet went unused, its existence was only revealed when several photos and a single video were leaked online.

The only practical asset used in the finished film was a prop of Shin Godzilla's tail, sculpted by Takayuki Takeya, which was depicting Shin's 5th form splitting off from the tail, photos of the prop revealed human jaws within the tail.

=== Design ===
Shin Godzilla's design was a new interpretation on the Godzilla character, as Anno and Higuchi chose to have Shin Godzilla come in many forms. Anno and Higuchi wanted the kaiju to mutate throughout the film, even as far as demonstrating the creature shed its skin by tearing itself out of its old body, but Toho vetoed the idea. However, Anno and Higuchi could still get away with unusual designs, so long as they evolved into a more conventional form of the character.

Shin Godzilla's first form is ambiguous with only the tail and back of the first form being seen in the film. Though concept art behind the film depict it to be a tadpole-like creature with two legs that were primitive in looks.

Shin Godzilla's second and third forms

Shin Godzilla second form stood horizontally, with its body held parallel to the ground, this form had small stubs in place of arms, and huge eyes with small black pupils. Unlike Shin Godzilla's later forms, the second form possesses a sickly-yellow complexion, with red exposed muscle on its back and shark-like gills that frequently bleed, indicating that it struggles to breathe outside the water. The second form has a long tail with a fluke at the end, similar to the first form.

The third form is much like traditional Godzilla incarnations in regards to appearance, the form is bipedal with much stronger and more developed hindlimbs and the ability to assume a stance much like a modern Godzilla would possess, smaller forelimbs and a long neck compared to its body. In this form, a red glow can be visibly seen from its fins, indicating that its mutation consumes much energy and produced a lot of heat. The creature's gills also have shrunk and closed up suggesting that this form has now adapted to breathe on land.

The fourth form of Shin Godzilla is very much akin to traditional designs, being fully bipedal, with a fully developed row of dorsal spines, and a much taller height compared to Shin's prior forms. The shade of skin for this form is a much darker black color with red glowing highlights around the exposed parts of the body such as his neck, back and legs. His face has no cheeks, no lips, but has multiple rows of jagged and gnarled teeth that are irregularly shaped and jut out from everywhere. Shin's eyes didn't possess any eyelids, but a protective nictitating membrane would cover the eyes in case if any explosions happen close to the eyes. It used the membrane again when releasing the thermal flame and the atomic breath. The most well-known alteration to Shin Godzilla was the tail, which was double the height of the entire body.

After being forcefully fed with a blood coagulant, Shin Godzilla went into a stage where his entire body freezes and shuts down, but to fight humans, it had to evolve to be like them, and his response was to spawn his own creatures from his tail. Shin Godzilla's fifth form takes on a humanoid appearance with Godzilla-like dorsal plates running up their spines, the models for the evolution show that the humanoids lack eyes, despite the concept art of the design originally having the humanoids possess them, with a large divide running down their cranium. These humanoid creatures were seen sprouting from the tail of the larger fourth form at the end of the film.

A deleted scene within the film showed the monster's ability could replicate through any matter separated from itself. In the scene where the JSDF investigate areas contaminated with radiation, they find a biomass, a mass of flesh that was blown off from Shin Godzilla by the bunker-buster bombs, and this biomass had sprouted eyes and teeth, but that was cut from the film as the filmmakers thought it would be "too disturbing" for audiences to watch.

=== Use for Shin Ultraman (2022) ===
Behind the scenes work for Shin Ultraman (2022), showing Shin Godzilla being repurposed to depict the kaiju Gomess.

In 2022, during the production of Shin Ultraman, Anno and Higuchi decided to repurpose the design of Shin Godzilla's fourth form, for the design of Gomess. They modified the creature with a different spine design, different tail design, extra horns on his head, altered the teeth design, added some exoskeleton features on the creature's chest and lower torso, changed the skin tone to a complete gray, removing the red glowing highlights on the creature, and changed the arm design on Gomess. Anno and Higuchi used Shin Godzilla's design as a nod to how the original Gomess was created using a recycled Godzilla suit from Mothra vs. Godzilla (1964) for Ultra Q episode 1 "Defeat Gomess!".

They also reused the same Gomess roar from episode 1 of Ultra Q for the new Gomess design, and featured his eyes glowing as a sign of life, after he dies at the hands of the JSDF, his eyes stop glowing.

=== Roar ===
Throughout the film, Shin Godzilla, all of Shin's roars are reused from past Godzilla incarnations. His first two forms (1st and 2nd forms) don't roar at all and are muted. His third form reuses roars from the 1954 film but re-edited. His fourth form reuses all of the Showa roars from King Kong vs. Godzilla (1962) through Terror of Mechagodzilla (1975). His final roar before freezing reuses the roar from the Heisei Godzilla from The Return of Godzilla (1984) through Godzilla vs. King Ghidorah (1991).

=== Atomic breath ===
In Shinnosuke vs Shin Godzilla, Shin Godzilla's atomic breath is shown to have a traditional blue hue instead of a purple hue prior to Shin Godzilla's release in theatres.

Shin Godzilla's atomic breath in Shin Godzilla (2016)

In Shin Godzilla, his atomic breath was completely different as it started off as a black smoke that was fired from his gaping mouth. This was then ignited into an orange stream of fire nicknamed the Super Thermal Radiation Particle Belt Flame (short name: Thermal Flame), the flames were then condensed into a purple laser dubbed as the Radiation Heat Beam. Shin Godzilla also releases several beams, known as "photons", from his dorsal plates and the end of his tail.

=== Reception ===
Following the release of the 2016 film Shin Godzilla, three of Shin's five forms seen in the Toho film were given nicknames after the places they made landfall on. The second form was nicknamed "Kamata-Kun" by fans after the Kamata district, the third form nicknamed "Shinagawa-Kun" after Shinagawa ward, and the fourth form was nicknamed "Kamakura-San" after Kamakura city in Kantō.

The Godzilla Fandom has sometimes referred to Shin Godzilla's 5th form as “Manzillas”, due to their humanoid appearance, but from Toho, there has been no official term. Some theories by individuals hint that Goro Maki, the scientist who created Shin and disappeared in the film, had merged with the creature resulting in the creation of the humanoid forms.

== Character's biography ==
=== Shinnosuke vs Shin Godzilla (2016) ===
Shin Godzilla is awakened from Tokyo Bay where it roars and starts attacking Japan by passing the Tokyo Sky Tree, Shuto Expressway, Saitama's prefecture border at Yashio's Ukizuka district, destroys the Ukihana bridge with his thick legs, advancing towards Kasukabe. When Shinnosuke arrived at school late, he learns about the creature's appearance and names it "Shin Godzilla", but he and his friends later name the monster "Godzilla". Shinnosuke and his friends alert the Prime Minister about Shin Godzilla's appearance and after some time, a montage of Shin Godzilla destroying parts of Japan with his massive body and finally arriving at Kasukabe, Shinnosuke is scaled up in size and confronts Shin Godzilla, but Shin retaliates with his own abilities, using his long tail against Shinnosuke, sending Shinnosuke flying.

Shin Godzilla unleashes his atomic breath and destroys parts of Tokyo and attempts to kill Shinnosuke, twice throughout Shinnosuke's confrontation with Shin Godzilla. Shin Godzilla is defeated when Shinnosuke fires a chemical down Shin's throat, blocking his third attempt of using his atomic breath. This chemical and blockage causes both Shinnosuke and Shin Godzilla to shrink in size with Shinnosuke being reduced back to his original size as a child, and Shin Godzilla being reduced to the size of a normal lizard. He was soon placed back into the ocean and swam away across the river, his whereabouts after that remain unknown.

=== Shin Godzilla (2016) ===
In 2016, Shin Godzilla first appeared, causing the water to erupt with steam and the Tokyo Bay Aqua Line tunnels to begin flooding with blood. The tail of his first form had burst from the surface of the bay. The Prime Minister thought that the creature couldn't go on land but as soon as the PM tried to calm the public, Shin made landfall in Tokyo's Kamata district stumbling around on his hindlegs, dropping blood from his gills.

He went at a crawling speed of 13 kilometres per hour (8.1 miles per hour) towards Shinagawa before stopping, falling down and evolving to his third form by rearing up on his hindlegs and sprouting arms. The Japanese Self Defense Forces (JSDF) tried to kill the creature but retreated when they realized civilians were still evacuating. in turn, Shin Godzilla ran back into the Tokyo Bay as his back started glowing red.

Shin Godzilla resurfaced again in his fourth form where he made landfall at Kamakura city, and left a trail of destruction and radiation in his wake. The JSDF then use all of their weapons, their Type 10 tanks, various choppers, and two Mitsubishi F-2 fighter jets, and not a single scratch was left on Shin's skin. As Shin Godzilla continued to advance towards Tokyo, the JSDF planned the United States to intervene with a massively destructive airstrike plan, and the Prime Minister is informed from an American ambassador that the USAF already deployed three Northrop B-2 Spirit stealth bombers armed with Massive Ordnance Penetrator bombs going to Japan. After Shin had arrived at Tokyo, proceeding to the Minato ward, he was hit with the bunker buster bombs from one of the B-2s. After he was hit, he became enraged and retaliated with his laser, destroying the first B-2.

As Kayoco Anne Patterson evacuates the city with an American ambassador in a car, she overhears that the first bomber was destroyed. The ambassador exclaims that it was impossible, while Patterson simply remarks that Shin Godzilla is "truly a god incarnate". B-2 bombers #2 and #3 circle back and prepare to drop more bombs towards Shin's back. As one of the pilots of the bombers said "payback time", the creature unleashed photons from its mouth and its dorsal plates. He shot the laser up into the sky, destroying the bombs and the bombers at the same time. Shin fires his atomic breath toward the city, cutting several skyscrapers in half and destroying the Eurocopter EC225 Super Puma helicopter carrying the Prime Minister. Shin Godzilla lit several districts of Tokyo ablaze before shutting down his system and going into hibernation at Tokyo station.

The next day, Shin Godzilla wakes up from the hibernation by Operation Yashiori when in the first phase, he was hit by driverless N700 Series Shinkansen bullet trains armed with C4 explosives. In the second phase, a smorgasbord of Predators and Reapers from the USAF go up the sky and launched missiles and warheads towards the monster. He used his lasers from his dorsals, mouth and tail against the weapons, but got depleted of energy. In the third phase, the operation uses a remote to knock down a set of skyscrapers onto Shin Godzilla and knock him to the ground.

In the fourth phase, one of the skyscrapers was blasted by a warhead from a USS Dewey, knocking Shin unconscious. In the fifth phase, he regained consciousness and destroyed the first crane platoon with his laser from his mouth, but more driverless-trains were sent to crash into Shin. After all of the coagulant from the second and third crane platoons were administered into Shin Godzilla's bloodstream, the creature woke up again, crunched on the cranes of the second and third crane platoons, and made one last roar before freezing solid, dropping the chest temperature to −196 °C (−320.8 °F), and leaving Shin Godzilla in a state of suspended animation. With Operation Yashiori a success, scientists and researchers found out that Shin Godzilla's isotopes had a half-life of 20 days, and the international community makes an agreement about executing a nuclear strike on Shin should he reawaken. At the last shot of the film, it is shown that up close, Shin Godzilla was evolving to his 5th form, where humanoid like creatures were emerging in his tail, as the monster realized the power of humanity.

=== Godzilla vs. Evangelion: The Real 4-D (2019) ===
Following the events of Second Impact in Neon Genesis Evangelion, Shin Godzilla appeared and knocked the GLAUX out of the air. The vehicle is nearly crushed to death by Shin's foot, but it is saved just in time and picked up by Evangelion Unit-01 and its pilot, Shinji Ikari. Asuka Shikanami Langley and Rei Ayanami, piloting Evangelion Unit-02 and 00, respectively, arrive shortly after and the three pilots begin fighting the monster. However, Shin Godzilla seems to be unaffected by their attacks, and swats them away with relative ease by shaking his body and swinging his tail at them.

Shin Godzilla in the 2019 crossover franchise film Godzilla vs. Evangelion: The Real 4-D.

Shin Godzilla then retaliates with his atomic breath; but instead of firing at the Eva Units, it instead fires it to the sky, where it hits an unseen force and combusts into flame. The explosion suddenly condenses into a new shape, creating Shin King Ghidorah/Shin Ghidorah, the source of the cosmic waves. As it descends on the city and confronts Shin Godzilla, Shin fires his atomic breath once again, but Ghidorah uses its gravity powers to deflect the beam in separate directions. Ghidorah then uses its gravity beams to lift several surrounding buildings into the air and throw them at Shin Godzilla, incapacitating it. The Evangelion Units attempt to fight King Ghidorah themselves, but are unable to stop its rampage. As they counter the dragon, Shin Godzilla rises to his feet again, where it and Ghidorah continue their battle. King Ghidorah attacks Shin Godzilla, but Shin uses his dorsal plate beams to counter Ghidorah's assault and knocking it back, before blasting Ghidorah with his atomic breath until it depletes itself of energy and becomes immobilized.

As Ghidorah rises again, the three Eva Units continue their effort to fight the monster; Unit-00 and 02 jump on King Ghidorah's body but are blasted off by its gravity beams. Unit-01 pulls a sword off of a nearby building and thrusts it into Ghidorah's chest, causing it to crash into the city below. For a brief moment, the creature seems defeated, only for Ghidorah to rise completely unharmed from the rubble and turns his attention to the frozen Shin Godzilla. Firing its gravity beams at it, Shin's body begins to glow again, seemingly using Ghidorah's attack to regain his energy. It awakens and shoots his atomic breath at Ghidorah, causing to two kaiju's beams to lock. Shin's beam gradually began to overpower Ghidorah's, moving closer until it strikes at Ghidorah, creating a blinding explosion, killing Ghidorah for good. Once the smoke settles, the Evangelion Units are left completely intact. Having defeated the rival, Shin Godzilla walked slowly back into the ocean, leaving Osaka-III and the EVA Units peacefully.

== Appearances ==
=== Films ===
- Shin Godzilla (2016)

=== TV series ===
- 67th NHK Kohaku Uta Gassen (2016, on TV)
- Crayon Shin-chan - in episode 901 "Shinnosuke vs Shin Godzilla"
- Chibi Godzilla Raids Again (2024, illustration) - in episode 45 "Godzilla King Showdown"

=== Amusement park attractions ===
- Godzilla: The Real 4-D (2017)
- Godzilla VR (2018)
- Godzilla vs. Evangelion: The Real 4-D (2019)
- Godzilla Interception Operation Awaji attraction video (2020)
- Operation Shin 765 (2022)
- Untitled Shin Japan Heroes Amusement World VR attraction (2022)

=== Books ===
- Definitive Edition: The Perfect Godzilla Giant Monster Super Encyclopedia (2016, only on the front cover of the book with other Godzilla specimens)
- Godzilla Giant Monster Battle Picture Book (2016, only on the front cover of the book with other Godzilla kaijus)
- Shin Godzilla Walker: The New Legend of the King of the Monsters (2016)
- The Art of Shin Godzilla (2016)
- Picturebook of Godzilla & All Monsters (2021)
- Godzilla: The Official Guide to the King of the Monsters - (2022)

=== Card games ===
- Battle Spirits (2016; BSC26 booster pack)
- Godzilla Card Game (2019)

=== Comics ===
- Godziman #1 and 16 (2019)

=== Manga ===
- Wave, Listen to Me! (2021 - Volume 8; mentioned as Shinagawa-kun)

=== Games ===
- Shin Godzilla Special Demo Content (2016) - on PlayStation VR
- Shin Arima (2016) - on Browser
- Pocoron Dungeons (2014. Mod in 2016) - on Android and iOS.
- Eternal Linkage (2017. Mod in 2018) - on Android and iOS.
- Godzilla Defense Force (2019) - on Android and iOS.
- Vivid Army (2019. Mod in 2020) - on Browser.
- Boku & Dragons (2015. Mod in 2022) - on Android and iOS.
- Godzilla Battle Line (2021. Mod in 2022) - on Android, iOS and PC.
- Pachinko True King of the Monsters Godzilla 2 (2022) - on Pachinko.
- P Godzilla vs. Evangelion: G Cell Awakening (2022) - on Pachinko.
- SD Shin Kamen Rider Rumble (2023) - on Nintendo Switch and PC.
- Taiko no Tatsujin: Rhythm Festival (2022. Mod in 2023) - on Nintendo Switch.
- Minecraft: Bedrock Edition (2011. Mod in 2024) - on Android, Fire OS/TV, iOS, Nintendo Switch, Samsung Gear VR, PlayStation 4 and 5, Windows 10 and 11, Windows Mobile, Xbox Series S and Series X and Xbox One.

== Public attractions ==
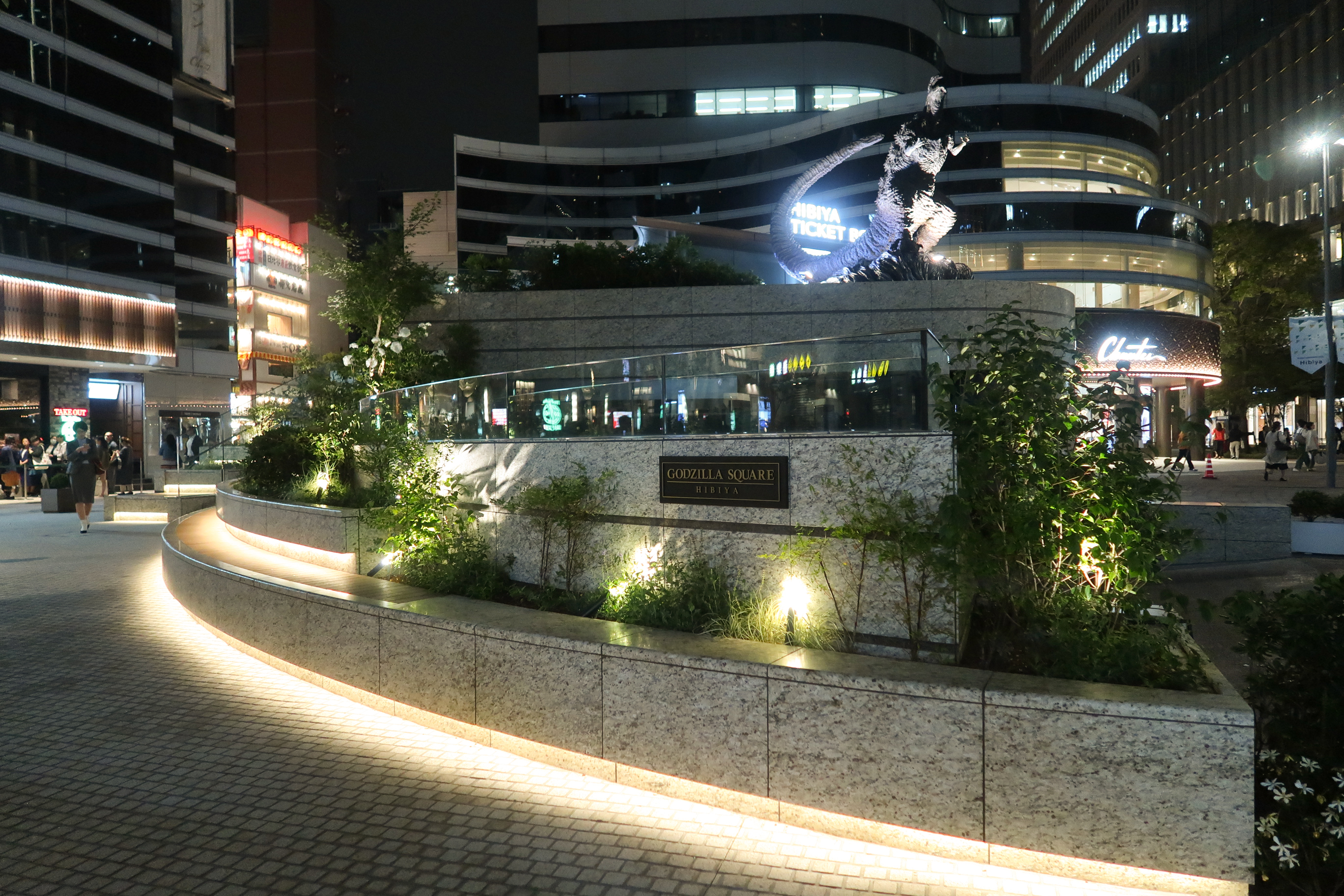
Shin Godzilla statue at Hibiya Godzilla Square in 2018.

In November 2016, the Fukuoka town built a 7 m (23 ft; 700 cm) tall statue of Shin Godzilla using straws. The statue was built for the Fukuoka town's Kagashi Matsuri festival. On March 23, 2018, a 3 m (9.8 ft; 300 cm) tall statue of Shin Godzilla was built in Tokyo's Hibiya Godzilla Square. This statue replaced the previous Heisei Godzilla statue, which was moved inside of the Toho Cinemas Hibiya building.

In October 2020, a zipline of Shin Godzilla's head and neck was built at Nijigen no Mori Park on Awaji Island, where people would go to visit the attraction and zipline through the monster's mouth. On December 1, 2021, XM announced their new 60-centimetre (600-millimetre; 0.60-metre; 24-inch) Shin Godzilla bust in collaboration with sculptor Tanaka Kenichi.

== See also ==
- Godzilla (Shōwa)
- Godzilla (Heisei)
- Godzilla (TriStar)
- Godzilla (Monsterverse)
- Godzilla (Takashi Yamazaki)

== Bibliography ==
- Anno, Hideaki; Higuchi, Shinji (2016). Shin Godzilla (Film) (in Japanese). Event occurs at 01:46:27. "Gojira, he's fallen, then roll out the second and third platoons"
- Anno, Hideaki (December 29, 2016). The Art of Shin Godzilla. Ground Works. ISBN 9784905033080.
- Brykczynski, Ben (2019-07-30). Godzilla: A Comprehensive Guide. Ben Brykczynski.
- Skipper, Graham (2022). Godzilla: The Official Guide to the King of the Monsters (in English and Japanese). Welbeck Publishing. p. 219. ISBN 9781802790009.
- Anno, Hideaki (2022-05-13). Shin Ultraman Design Works. Khara. ISBN 9784905033288.
