= Shin Godzilla =

2016 film by Hideaki Anno and Shinji Higuchi

- Theatrical release poster

Japanese name
- Katakana: シン・ゴジラ
Transcriptions
- Revised Hepburn: Shin Gojira
- Directed by: Hideaki Anno; Shinji Higuchi
- Written by: Hideaki Anno
- Produced by: Minami Ichikawa; Taichi Ueda; Yoshihiro Sato; Masaya Shibusawa; Kazutoshi Wadakura
- Starring: Hiroki Hasegawa; Yutaka Takenouchi; Satomi Ishihara
- Cinematography: Kosuke Yamada
- Edited by: Atsuki Satō; Hideaki Anno
- Music by: Shirō Sagisu
- Production companies: Toho Pictures; Cine Bazar
- Distributed by: Toho Co., Ltd.
- Release dates: July 25, 2016 (Shinjuku); July 29, 2016 (Japan)
- Running time: 120 minutes
- Country: Japan
- Languages: Japanese; English
- Budget: ¥1.3 billion (Note: According to Toshio Okada and Kinema Junpo, the film's production budget was ¥1.3 billion; the latter noted that the production cost began at ¥900 million and advertising expenses brought the total budget to ¥2.19 billion.)
- Box office: $83.3 million (Note: Shin Godzilla's worldwide box office: Original run – $79,277,989; 2025 North American re-release – $4,042,146)

Shin Godzilla (シン・ゴジラ, Shin Gojira) (Note: The Katakana for "Shin" in the film's Japanese title was chosen by director Hideaki Anno as it can stand for "new" (新), "true" (真), or "God" (神). The film is also known as Godzilla Resurgence, its initial English title.) is a 2016 Japanese kaiju film directed by Hideaki Anno and Shinji Higuchi, with a screenplay by Anno and visual effects by Higuchi. Produced by Toho Pictures and Cine Bazar and distributed by Toho Co., Ltd., it is the 31st film in the Godzilla franchise, the 29th film produced by Toho, Toho's third reboot of the franchise, and the first film in the franchise's Reiwa era. (Note: Japan's Reiwa era began on May 1, 2019, however, Toho considers Shin Godzilla (2016) and the Polygon Pictures anime trilogy – Godzilla: Planet of the Monsters (2017), Godzilla: City on the Edge of Battle, and Godzilla: The Planet Eater (both 2018) – as part of the Reiwa era.) It is the first reboot of a tokusatsu series to be adapted by Anno and Higuchi, followed by Shin Ultraman (2022) and Shin Kamen Rider (2023). The film stars Hiroki Hasegawa, Yutaka Takenouchi, and Satomi Ishihara. In the film, politicians struggle with bureaucratic red tape in order to deal with the sudden appearance of an ever-evolving monster named Godzilla.

In December 2014, Toho announced plans for a new domestic Godzilla film. Anno and Higuchi were announced as the directors in March 2015. Principal photography began in September 2015 and ended in October 2015. Inspiration for the film was drawn from the March 2011 earthquake, tsunami, and nuclear disaster in Japan. Production had a budget of ¥1.3 billion, with advertising bringing the film's total budget to ¥2.19 billion.

Shin Godzilla was released in Japan on July 29, receiving critical acclaim from Japanese critics and mixed reviews from Western critics. (Note: Attributed to multiple references:) The film grossed $79 million worldwide in its initial theatrical run, and $83.3 million with re-releases, becoming the highest-grossing live-action Japanese film of 2016. It was also the highest-earning Japanese-produced Godzilla film until surpassed by Godzilla Minus One in 2023. At the 40th Japan Academy Film Prize, it received 11 Japan Academy Prize nominations, winning seven including Picture of the Year and Director of the Year.

== Plot ==
In 2016, the Japan Coast Guard investigates an abandoned yacht in Tokyo Bay. The boat is soon destroyed, and the Tokyo Bay Aqua-Line is flooded with blood. After seeing a viral video of the incident, Deputy Chief Cabinet Secretary Rando Yaguchi believes it was caused by a living creature, which is confirmed when news reports reveal its tail emerging from the ocean. Shortly thereafter, the creature moves inland, crawling through the Kamata district and the Shinagawa area of Tokyo, leaving a path of death and destruction during a disorganized and chaotic evacuation. The creature quickly evolves into a bipedal form, but overheats and returns to the sea.

The government officials focus on military strategy and civilian safety; Yaguchi is put in charge of a task force researching the creature. With high radiation readings from the creature's path, the task force realizes that it is energized by nuclear fission. The U.S. sends a special envoy, Kayoco Anne Patterson, who reveals that Goro Maki, a disgraced, anti-nuclear zoology professor, studied mutations caused by radioactive contamination and predicted the creature's appearance. Both American and Japanese scientific circles disbelieved Maki. The U.S. then prevented him from publicly disclosing his conclusions. The abandoned yacht in Tokyo Bay belonged to Maki, who left his research notes, jumbled into a code, on the boat before disappearing.

The creature—named "Godzilla" after Maki's research—reappears in its fourth form, twice its original size, making landfall near Kamakura. The Japan Self-Defense Forces mobilize but prove ineffective as Godzilla breaks through their defenses into Tokyo. The U.S. intervenes with a massively destructive airstrike plan, prompting the evacuation of civilians and government personnel. Godzilla is wounded with MOP "bunker-buster" bombs but responds with destructive atomic rays fired from its mouth and dorsal plates, destroying a helicopter carrying the prime minister, along with top government officials, and incinerating large swaths of Tokyo. Depleted of its energy, Godzilla goes into hibernation.

Yaguchi's team discovers that Godzilla's plates and blood work as a cooling system, theorizing that it could use a coagulating agent to freeze Godzilla. Analyzing tissue samples reveals that Godzilla is an ever-evolving creature capable of reproducing asexually. The United Nations, aware of this, informs Japan that thermonuclear weapons will be used against Godzilla if Japan fails to subdue it in a few days; evacuations are ordered in multiple prefectures in preparation. Unwilling to see nuclear weapons detonated in Japan again, Patterson uses her political connections to buy time for Yaguchi's team, in which the interim government has little faith.

Yaguchi's team manages to decipher Goro Maki's encoded research using origami. The team adjusts its plan and procures the means to conduct its deep-freeze plan with international support. Hours before the planned nuclear attack, Japan enacts the deep-freeze plan. Godzilla is provoked into expelling its atomic breath and energy against Predator and Reaper drones. The team then detonates nearby buildings and sends unmanned trains loaded with explosives toward Godzilla's feet to subdue it, enabling tankers full of coagulant to inject it into Godzilla's mouth. Many are killed, but Godzilla is eventually frozen solid.

In the aftermath, scientists discover that Godzilla's isotope has a half-life of twenty days, and that Tokyo can soon be rebuilt. The international community agrees to cancel the nuclear attack on the condition that, should Godzilla reawaken, an immediate thermonuclear strike will be executed. On Godzilla's tail, humanoid creatures appear frozen mid-emergence.

== Cast ==
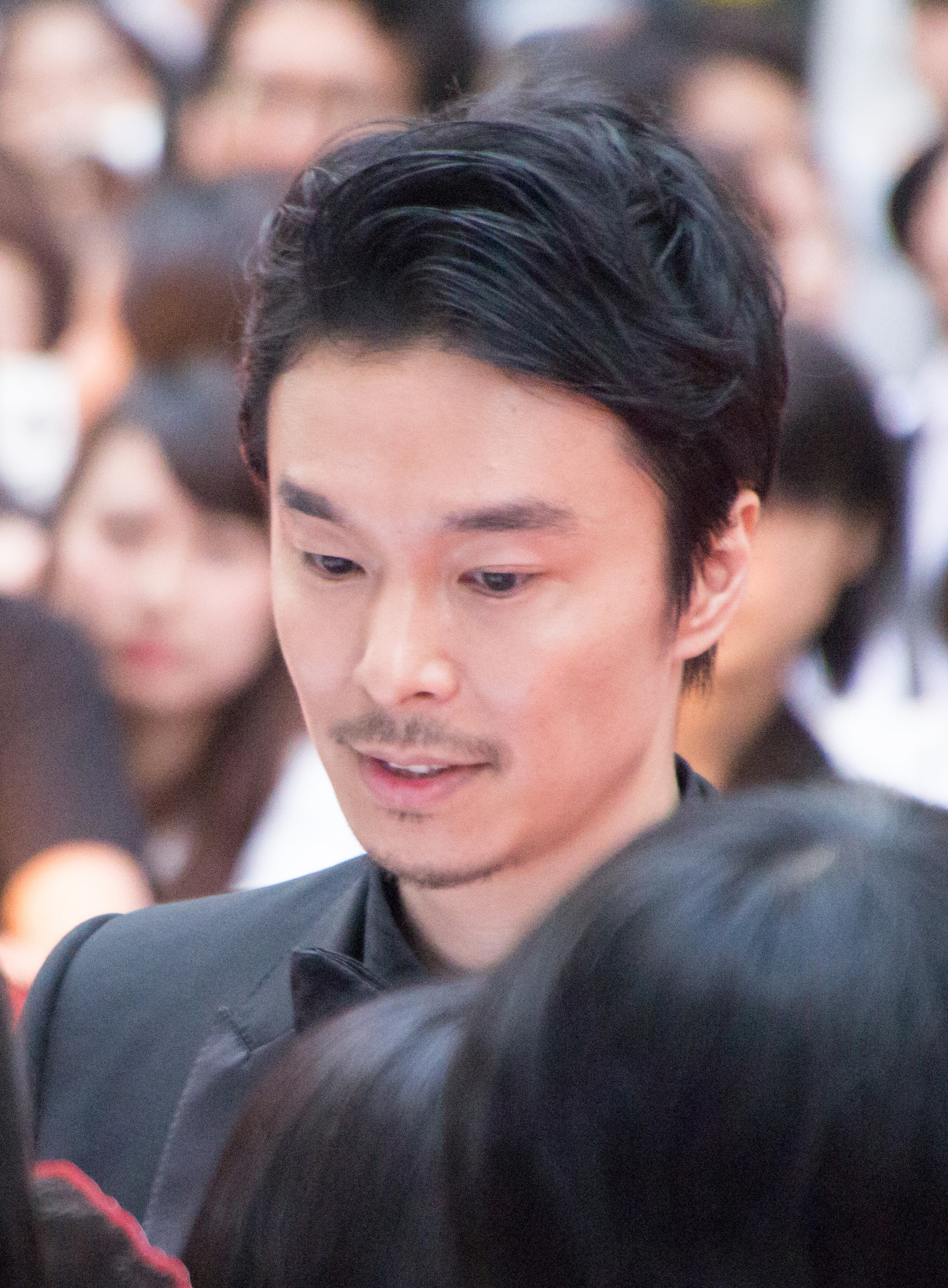
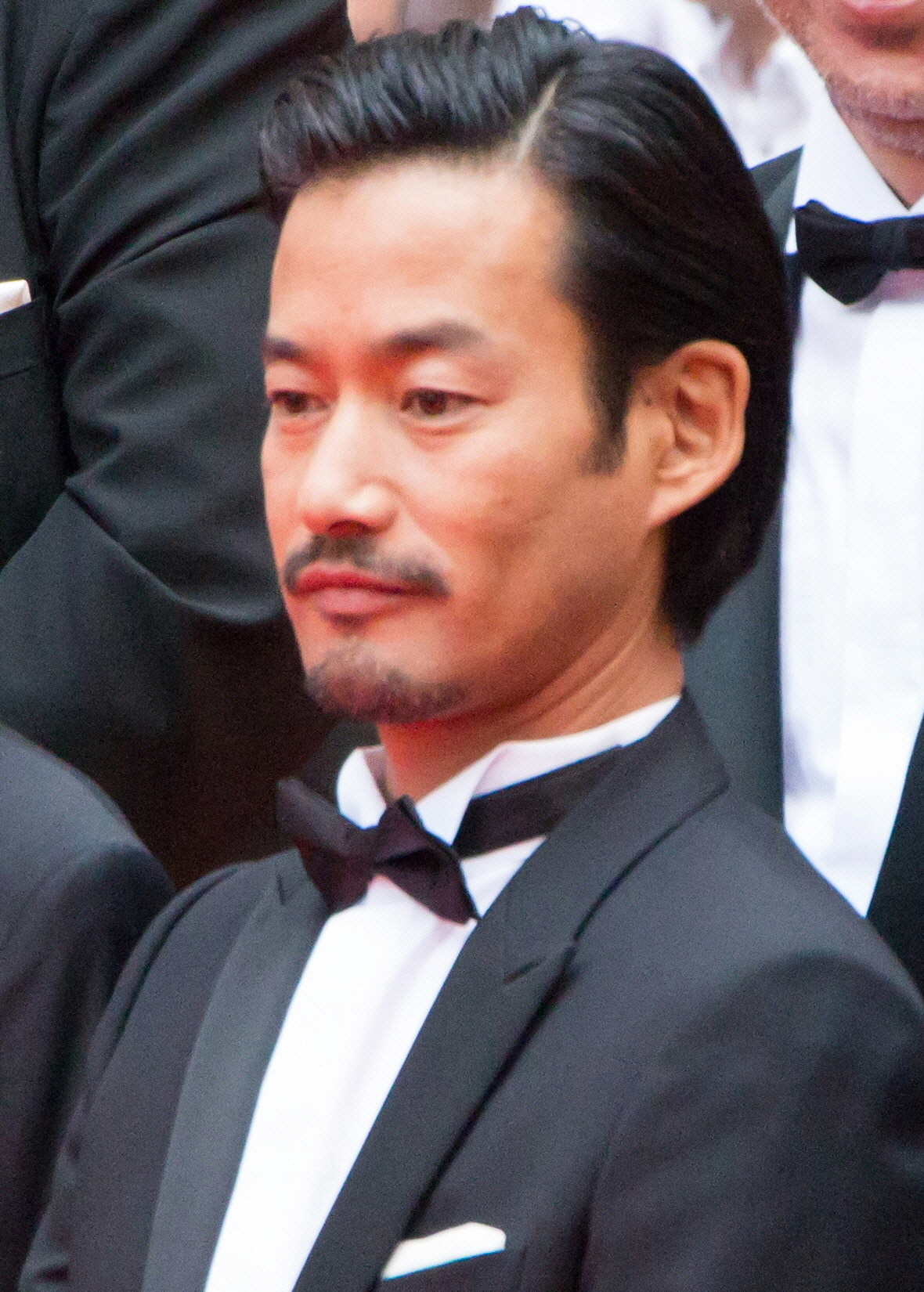
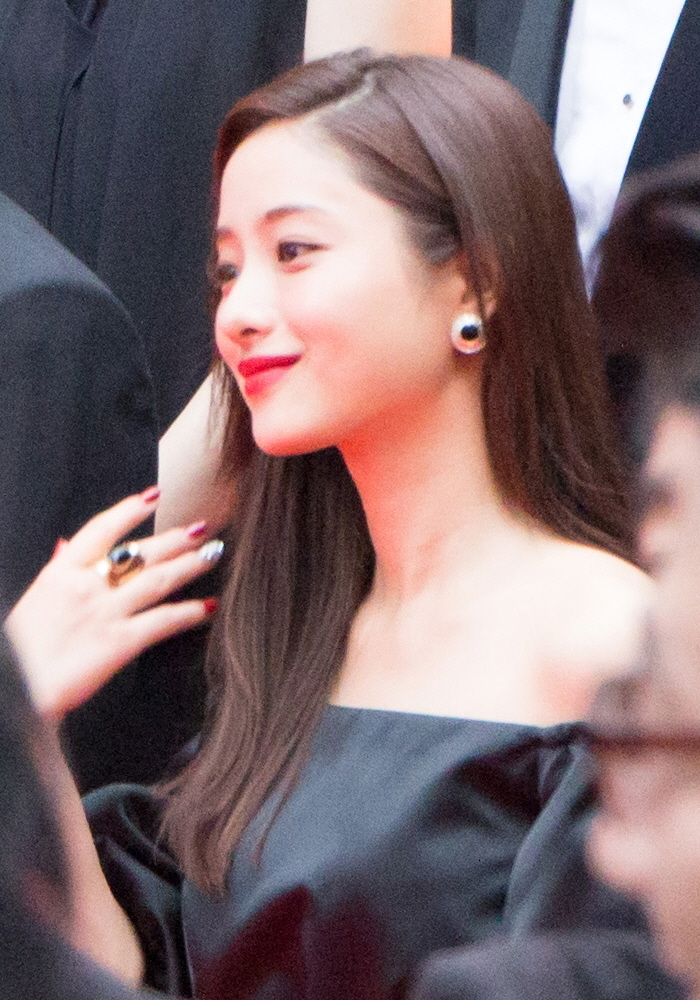
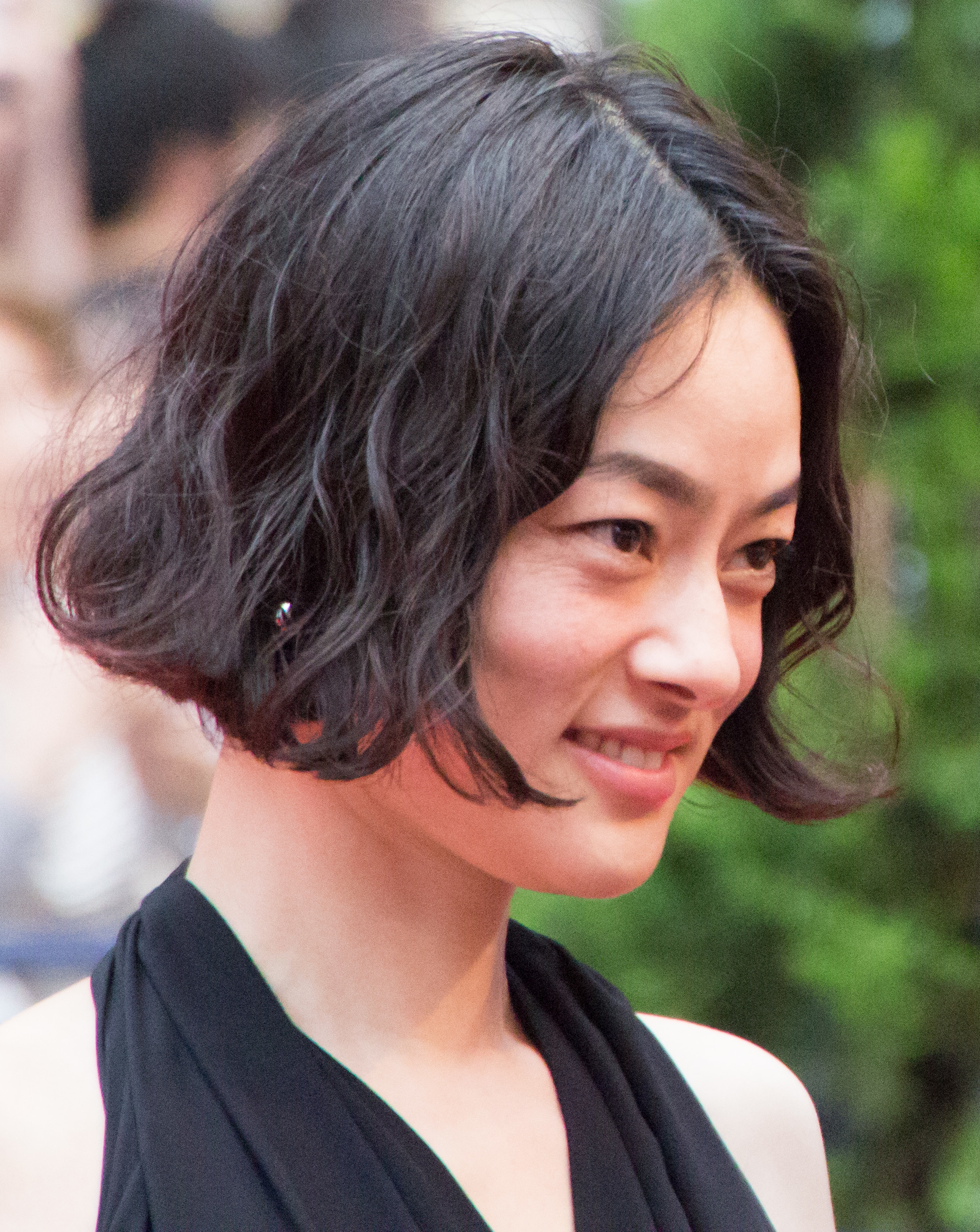
Hiroki Hasegawa, Yutaka Takenouchi, Satomi Ishihara and Mikako Ichikawa at the Shin Godzilla world premiere in 2016
- Hiroki Hasegawa as Rando Yaguchi, Deputy Chief Cabinet Secretary. After Toho offered him the role, Hasegawa immediately accepted, stating, "Who wouldn't want to be involved in a Godzilla production?"
- Yutaka Takenouchi as Hideki Akasaka, Aide to the Prime Minister of Japan. Takenouchi stated that the film would contain a "deeper message".
- Satomi Ishihara as Kayoco Anne Patterson, Special Envoy for the President of the United States. She became excited after accepting the role but was stressed that her character features "English-heavy dialogue", stating, "Sometimes it's so frustrating, I just want to cry".

The film features several cameos and supporting appearances, including Kengo Kora, Ren Osugi, Akira Emoto, Kimiko Yo, Jun Kunimura, Mikako Ichikawa, Pierre Taki, Takumi Saito, Keisuke Koide, Arata Furuta, Sei Hiraizumi, Kenichi Yajima, Tetsu Watanabe, Ken Mitsuishi, Kyūsaku Shimada, Kanji Tsuda, Issei Takahashi, Shinya Tsukamoto, Kazuo Hara, Isshin Inudo, Akira Ogata, Shingo Tsurumi, Suzuki Matsuo, Kreva, Katsuhiko Yokomitsu, and Atsuko Maeda. Mansai Nomura portrayed Godzilla through motion capture. Jun Kunimura previously appeared in Godzilla: Final Wars. Akira Emoto appeared in Godzilla vs. SpaceGodzilla.

Cast taken from the press notes, except where cited otherwise.

== Themes ==
Whereas the original Godzilla film was conceived as a metaphor for the atomic bombings of Hiroshima and Nagasaki and the dangers of nuclear weapons, Shin Godzilla drew inspiration from the 2011 Fukushima nuclear disaster and the Tōhoku earthquake and tsunami. Many critics noted similarities to those events. Mark Schilling of The Japan Times wrote that the interpretation of Godzilla in Shin Godzilla serves "as an ambulatory tsunami, earthquake and nuclear reactor, leaving radioactive contamination in his wake". Roland Kelts, the author of Japanamerica, felt that the "mobilizing blue-suited civil servants and piles of broken planks and debris quite nakedly echo scenes of the aftermath of the great Tohoku earthquake, tsunami and nuclear disaster." Matt Alt of The New Yorker drew similar parallels with "the sight of blue-jumpsuited government spokesmen convening emergency press conferences ... [and] a stunned man quietly regarding mountains of debris, something that could have been lifted straight out of television footage of the hardest-hit regions up north. Even the sight of the radioactive monster's massive tail swishing over residential streets evokes memories of the fallout sent wafting over towns and cities in the course of Fukushima Daiichi's meltdown."

Robert Rath from Zam argued that Shin Godzilla is a satire of Japanese politics, and likened the protagonist Rando Yaguchi to the Fukushima plant manager Masao Yoshida. William Tsutsui, author of Godzilla on My Mind, wrote in the Arkansas Democrat-Gazette that "Shin Godzilla leaves no doubt that the greatest threat to Japan comes not from without but from within, from a geriatric, fossilized government bureaucracy unable to act decisively or to stand up resolutely to foreign pressure." In his review for Forbes, Ollie Barder wrote that the film depicted the Japanese government's "complex and corpulent bureaucratic ways ... unable to deal with a crisis in any kind of efficient or fluid way", noting that the government members use the hierarchical system to protect their positions at the expense of citizens' lives. According to Schilling, the government officials, Self-Defense Forces officers and others working to defeat Godzilla are portrayed as hardworking and intelligent, despite "some initial bumbling".

Then-prime minister Shinzō Abe spoke positively of the film's pro-nationalist themes, stating, "I think that [Godzilla's] popularity is rooted in the unwavering support that the public has for the Self-Defense Forces."

== Production ==
=== Crew ===
- Hideaki Anno – director, writer, editor
- Shinji Higuchi – co-director, VFX director
- Katsuro Onoe – associate director, VFX creative director
- Kimiyoshi Adachi – assistant director
- Akihiro Yamauchi – executive producer
- Takeshi Sato – production manager
- Masato Inatsuki – production manager
- Kensei Mori – line producer
- Atsuki Satō – editor, VFX supervisor
- Tetsuo Ohya – VFX producer

Personnel taken from the English press release.

=== Development ===
A blend of practical effects and computer-generated imagery was considered (the former tested) for Godzilla; however, Toho settled on a completely CGI monster. Mansai Nomura portrayed Godzilla via motion capture.

In December 2014, Toho announced plans for a new Godzilla film for a 2016 release, stating, "This is very good timing after the success of the American version this year: if not now, then when? The licensing contract we have with Legendary places no restrictions on us making domestic versions." The new film would have no ties to Legendary's MonsterVerse and would serve as a reboot to Toho's series. Minami Ichikawa would serve as the film's production manager and Taiji Ueda as the film's project leader. Ueda confirmed that the screenplay was in development and filming had been planned for a summer 2015 shoot. Toho would additionally put together a project team, known as "Godzilla Conference" or "Godzi-con", to formulate future projects.

In March 2015, Toho announced that the film would be co-directed by Hideaki Anno and Shinji Higuchi (who both collaborated on the anime Neon Genesis Evangelion), in addition to Anno writing the screenplay and Higuchi directing the film's special effects. In addition, Toho announced that the film would begin filming in the fall of 2015 set for a summer 2016 release. Promotional artwork of the new Godzilla's footprint was also released, with Toho confirming that their new Godzilla would surpass Legendary Pictures' Godzilla as the tallest incarnation to date.

Toho had approached Anno in January 2013 to direct the reboot but Anno initially declined due to falling into depression after completing Evangelion: 3.0 You Can (Not) Redo, stating, "A representative from Toho contacted me directly, saying, 'We'd like to direct a new Godzilla film.' At the time, I was still recovering from EVA 3.0, and right on the spot, flatly refused the offer, 'It's impossible. Even to begin work on the next Eva is impossible.'" However, Toho's sincerity and his longtime friend and co-director, Shinji Higuchi, eventually convinced him to accept the offer in March 2013. Anno had also refused the offer due to a lack of confidence, stating, "I refused [the offer] since I didn't have confidence that I could exceed the first film or come close to equaling it. But I thought that if I were to come close even a little, I would have to do the same thing [as the first film]." Mahiro Maeda provided the new design for Godzilla while Takayuki Takeya provided the maquette. Director Higuchi stated that he intended to provide the "most terrifying Godzilla that Japan's cutting-edge special-effects movie-making can muster." A variety of techniques such as puppets, animatronics, and digital effects were initially considered and an upper-body animatronic was produced but went unused after Toho decided to create a completely CG Godzilla. VFX supervisor and co-editor Atsuki Satō stated, "CG production had already been determined when I began participating. In the end, it was the best option to allow quick edits as creative visions changed and produced a high quality film." A colorless maquette was built for CG animators to use as a reference when rendering the CG Godzilla model. Mansai Nomura provided the motion capture performance for Godzilla.

=== Filming ===
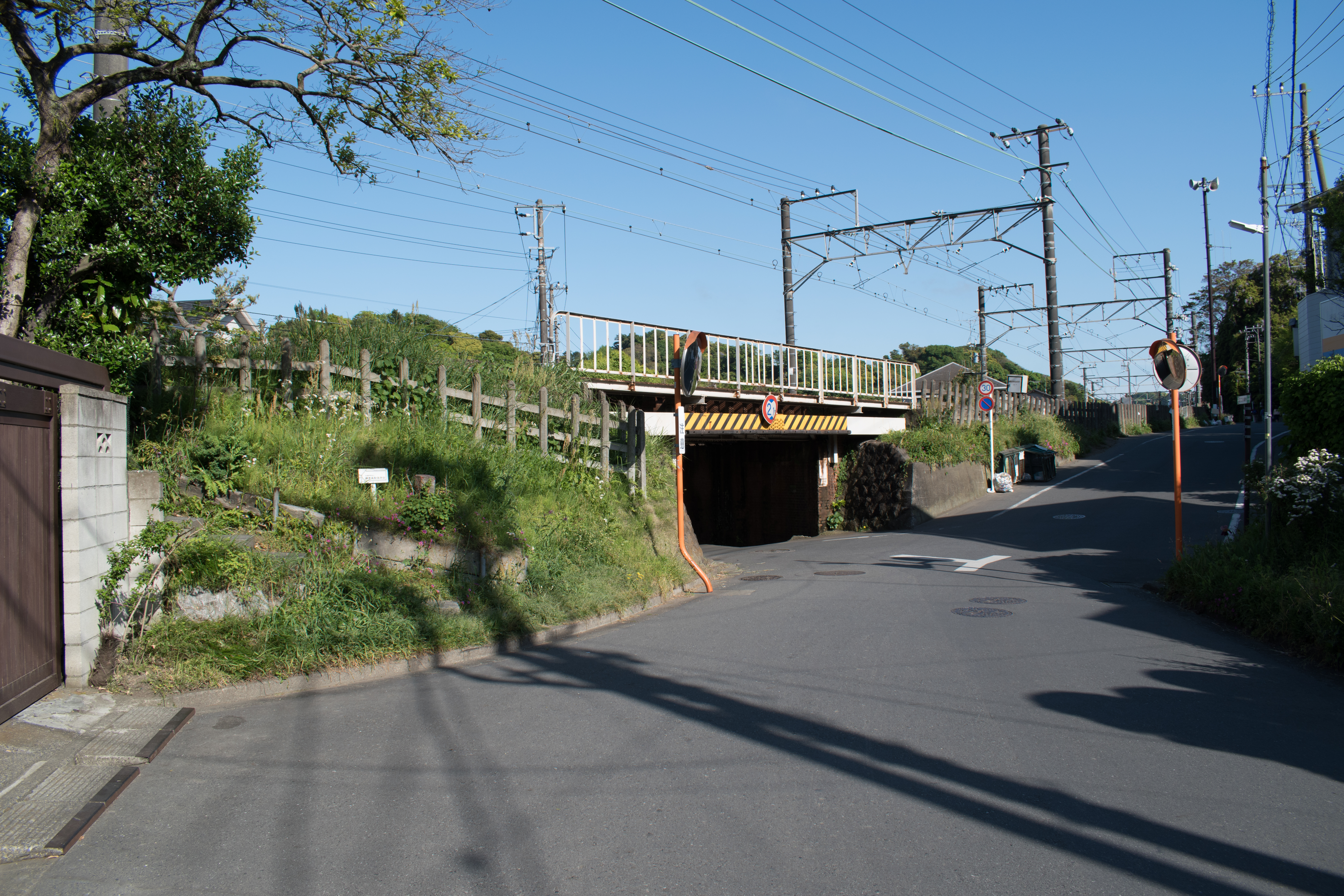
The large-scale shooting was on September 20, 2015, at the city of Kamakura in the Yokosuka Line.

Principal photography began on September 1, 2015, with a large on-location film shoot at Kamata station in Tokyo. It commenced on a budget of ¥900 million, which later rose to ¥1.3 billion; Anno noted that "originally, we couldn't make it with that budget". Toho independently invested the film's production, taking a financial risk by doing so, as assisted funding from other organizations is customary for the creation of Japanese films.

On September 23, 2015, Toho revealed the film's official title as Shin Gojira and that the film would star Hiroki Hasegawa, Yutaka Takenouchi, and Satomi Ishihara. Producer Akihiro Yamauchi stated that the title Shin Gojira was chosen for the film due to the variety of meanings it conveys, such as either "new" (新), "true" (真), or "God" (神). Yamauchi also confirmed that the film has been planned for quite some time, stating, "It's been in the works a long time. It's not like it was produced just because of the Hollywood Godzilla". Principal photography wrapped at the end of October 2015, with special effects work scheduled for November 2015.

=== Music ===
Shiro Sagisu scored the film. The score features various remixes of "Decisive Battle" from Sagisu's Neon Genesis Evangelion score, and recycles several Akira Ifukube tracks. Anno had decided to use Ifukube's music while writing the screenplay and attempted to adapt the old Ifukube tracks to modern stereo settings but the task proved too daunting and eventually settled on using the mono mixes instead. The soundtrack was released on July 30, 2016, and sold 8,427 copies in 2 weeks, with "Who Will Know" being a notable track.

== Release ==
=== Marketing ===
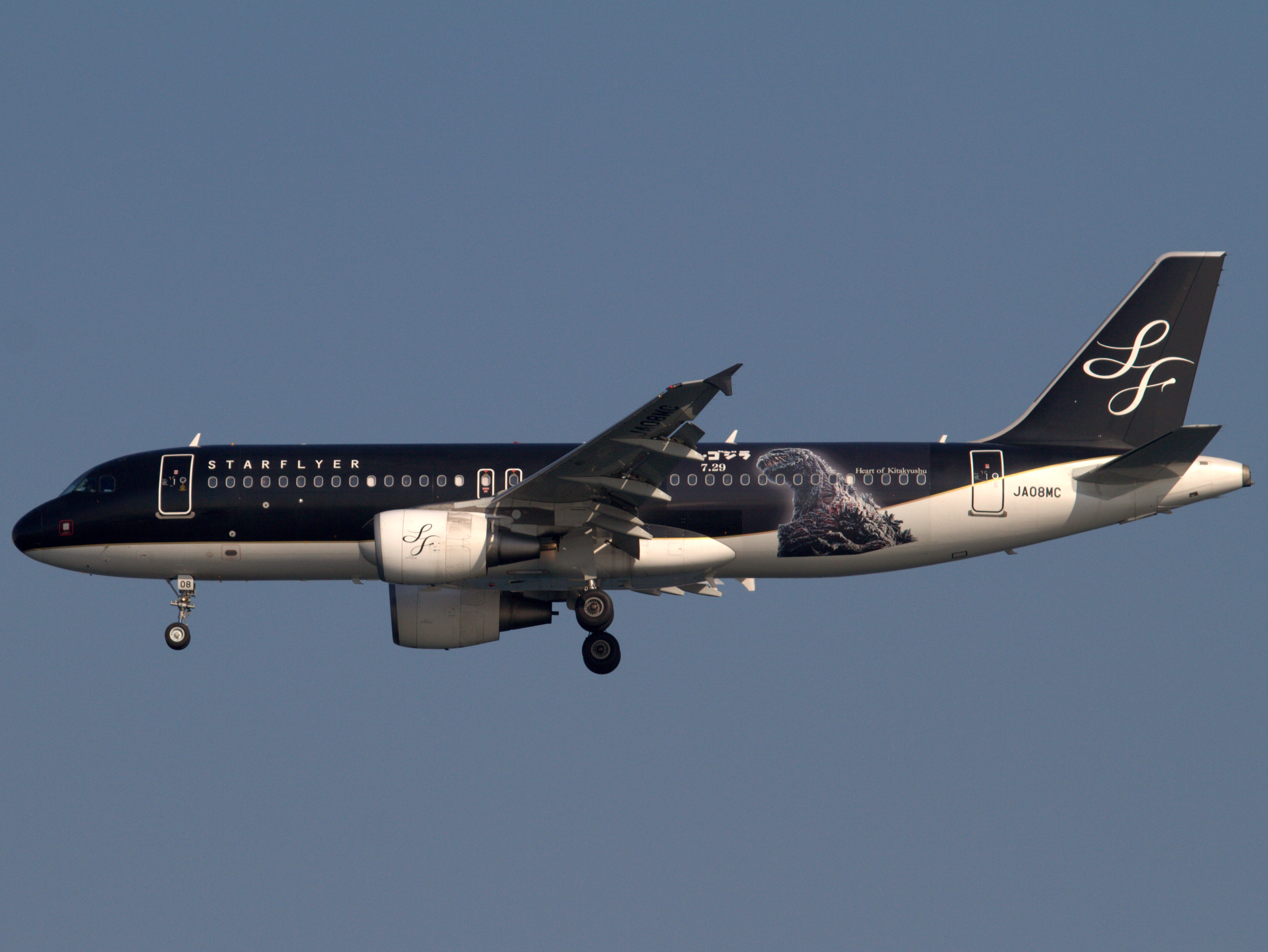
An Airbus A320 operated by StarFlyer wearing a special livery to advertise the release of the film in Japan

In November 2015, without any prior announcement, Toho screened a promo reel at the American Film Market for a potential sale for overseas markets, marketing the film (for a while) as Godzilla: Resurgence. In December 2015, Toho unveiled the film's first teaser trailer and teaser poster revealing Toho's new Godzilla design and the film's July 29, 2016, release date. Chunichi Sports reported the size of the new Godzilla to be 118.5 metres (389 ft) tall, over 10 metres (33 ft) taller than Legendary's Godzilla. He is the second tallest live action Godzilla in history.

In January 2016, images of the Godzilla suit were leaked online. In late March 2016, it was announced that Toho's Godzilla and Anno's Evangelion intellectual properties would form a "maximum collaboration" for merchandise in April 2016. In mid-April 2016, Toho revealed the complete design of the new Godzilla and that it is a completely CG-generated character, as well as a new trailer, details regarding the principal and supporting characters, and that the film will be released in IMAX, 4DX, and MX4D formats for its domestic release.

For summer 2016, the Namja Town amusement park held special Godzilla cross-promotion activities. The park unveiled a new virtual reality game, the food court produced kaiju-inspired food dishes, and a Godzilla foot on display as though it had crashed through the roof of the attached Sunshine City Alpa shopping center. Sports equipment manufacturer Reebok released limited-edition Godzilla sneakers featuring a black reptilian skin pattern and either red or glow-in-the-dark green coloring in Japan.

=== Theatrical ===
Posters for the film's North American theatrical releases. Funimation (left) initially released the film in October 2016. Toho-owned GKIDS (right) re-released the film in August 2025, utilizing a 4K remaster.

Shin Godzilla was theatrically released on July 29, 2016, in Japan in IMAX, 4DX, and MX4D in over 350 theaters and 446 screens. It had its red carpet premiere on July 25, 2016. The premiere took place in Tokyo along Kabuki-cho Central Road, with a red carpet from the Hotel Gracery Shinjuku, the hotel which has the large Godzilla head peering over, 118.5 metres in length, the same distance as the height of Godzilla.

In July 2016, Toho announced that the film had been sold to 100 territories (including Asia, Africa, Europe, and North America) in 19 days after opening to foreign sales and will be released in Taiwan on August 12, the Philippines on August 24, Hong Kong and Macao on August 25, and Thailand on September 8. At the 2016 San Diego Comic-Con, it was announced that Funimation would distribute the film for North America, Central America, South America, and the Caribbean for a late 2016 release as Shin Godzilla, instead of Godzilla: Resurgence, at the insistence of Toho.

In early September, Funimation officially announced that the film was to be given a one-week limited release in the United States and Canada from October 11–18 on 440 screens, in Japanese with English subtitles, making it the first Japanese Godzilla film to receive a theatrical North American release since Godzilla 2000. Funimation hosted two North American premieres for the film, one premiere on October 3 in Los Angeles and the other on October 5 in New York. Due to popular demand, Funimation extended the film's North American theatrical run with encore screenings for October 22 and select theaters offering daily screenings through October 27. That same month, Indonesian Film Censorship Board listed and registered both Shin Godzilla and Doraemon: Nobita and the Birth of Japan 2016.

In the UK, Altitude Films screened the film at FrightFest in Glasgow on February 24, 2017. Altitude Films later dropped the film, with The Electric confirming in a Tweet: "the UK distributor Altitude have dropped it, and Toho aren't allowing any UK screenings at the mo [sic]." The UK theatrical rights were later acquired by Manga Entertainment for an August 10, 2017, release.

The film was re-released in North American theaters via GKIDS (now owned by Toho) on August 14, 2025, utilizing a 4K remaster.

==== Black-and-white edition ====
A black-and-white version of the film, titled Shin Godzilla: Orthochromatic (シン・ゴジラ：オルソ, Shin Gojira: Oruso), premiered at Ikebukuro Humax Cinemas in Tokyo on October 27, 2023 as part of the special theatrical screenings of four Godzilla films selected by Takashi Yamazaki in commemoration of the release of Godzilla Minus One. This version was conceived by Anno with Higuchi and associate director Katsuro Onoue supervising its production. The film was later screened at seven select Japanese theaters on October 28 and 29. It was released on DVD and Blu-Ray on May 1, 2024.

The black-and-white version debuted in North American theaters on August 31, 2025 via GKIDS.

=== Home media ===
In Japan, Shin Godzilla was released on DVD and Blu-ray by Toho on March 22, 2017. The film's Japan home video release sold 520,000 units for the DVD version, 100,000 units for the Blu-ray Special Edition, and 55,402 units for the Blu-ray Standard Edition, totaling 675,402 DVD and Blu-ray sales in Japan. In North America, the film was released on Blu-ray, DVD and digital on August 1, 2017, by Funimation, which featured an English dub produced by Funimation. In the United States, the Blu-ray and DVD grossed $5.9 million in video sales. In the United Kingdom, the film was released on DVD and Blu-ray by Manga Entertainment on December 4, 2017. This release also included the Funimation dub. The film was released on DVD and Blu-ray in the UK on December 4. The Blu-ray edition of the film ranked at no.32 on the UK Blu-ray chart for the week ending December 16.

In March 2017, Toho released the film on 4K Blu-ray in Japan. In June 2025, GKIDS announced that they would release the film on 4K Blu-ray in North America, following a theatrical re-release. The film was released on 4K Blu-ray and re-issued on Blu-ray in North America on October 28, 2025. The GKIDS release features a new English dub recorded by NYAV Post.

== Reception ==
=== Box office ===
In Japan, Shin Godzilla earned ¥625 million ($6.1 million) on its opening weekend and was number one at the box office for that weekend, placing Finding Dory at second place and One Piece Film: Gold at third place, and earned 23% more than 2014's Godzilla when it opened in Japan. It was more than triple the first weekend's gross of 2004's Godzilla: Final Wars, the previous Toho film in the series, which in the end grossed $12.3 million. The film remained at number one during its second weekend and was projected to finish at $40 million domestically. The film dropped to second place during its third weekend, topped by The Secret Life of Pets, earning $33.5 million after 17 days, topping the estimates for both 2004's Godzilla: Final Wars and 2014's Godzilla. The film reached ¥5.3 billion ($51.63 million) a month after its release, topping the earnings for Anno's previous film Evangelion: 3.0 You Can (Not) Redo, which earned ¥5,267,373,350.

On its sixth weekend, the film climbed back to number two, topped by Your Name, with an earning of US$3.2 million, bringing the film's total domestic gross to $60 million from 4.1 million admissions. On September 4, 2016, the film has grossed $58.18 million. After exiting the top ten in late September, the film has grossed nearly $78 million from 5.6 million admissions. Shin Godzilla became the highest grossing live-action Japanese film for 2016, and the second highest grossing film in Japan for the year. It also became the highest-grossing Japanese-produced Godzilla film in the franchise. In the United States and Canada, the film grossed $1.9 million during its limited 31 day run. Outside of Japan and North America, the film was released in a handful of International markets. In Taiwan, it grossed $264,235; in Australia it grossed $84,090; in New Zealand it grossed $13,892; in Thailand it grossed $322,061; in South Korea it grossed $36,915; and in Spain it grossed $8,031. The film grossed $75.4 million in Japan and $79.3 million worldwide.

For its 2025 theatrical re-release in North America, the film earned $1.6 million from 1,290 screens on its opening weekend, bringing its total to $2.5 million.

=== Critical response ===
Shin Godzilla received critical acclaim in Japan, while Western critics gave it a more mixed response. The special effects and new depiction of Godzilla were praised, but the film was criticized for its long scenes, confusing dialogue, over-crowded characters and subplots. On review aggregator Rotten Tomatoes, the film has an approval rating of 87% based on 87 reviews, with an average rating of 6.70/10. The site's consensus reads: "Godzilla Resurgence offers a refreshingly low-fi – and altogether entertaining – return to the monster's classic creature-feature roots." On Metacritic, the film has a score of 67 out of 100 based on 14 critics, indicating "generally favorable reviews".

Japanese pop culture site RO65 called the film a "masterpiece of unprecedented filmmaking", and felt that the film retains a "strong respect for the fundamental message within Godzilla". Oricon Style praised directors Hideaki Anno and Shinji Higuchi for their realistic approach and the film's reality vs. idealism themes, calling it a "world class" Godzilla film. Cinema Today called the film a "thrilling experience" and a "masterpiece", feeling that the film was a return to form similar to 2004's Dawn of the Dead. Kazuo Ozaki from Eiga.com praised the film as well, stating, "Hollywood, even with all its money, can't approach this kind of perfection" while Koichi Irikura of Cinema Today called it a "birth of a masterpiece that boldly announces the revival of a Japanese Godzilla". Brian Ashcraft from Kotaku felt the film was a "letdown", though he praised the film's special effects and social reflection of Japan, he criticized the film's depiction of the human characters, stating, "I wish the movie explored the relationships between the politicians and the researchers more instead of glossing over it" and concluded that "This isn't one of the best Godzilla films ever made, but it's certainly not one of the worst by any stretch, either. Godzilla: Resurgence is a series of compelling ideas in a so-so Godzilla movie".

Ollie Barder from Forbes was surprised at "how good" the film was, praising Anno's references to visual tropes from Gainax properties such as Neon Genesis Evangelion, though he was not completely fond of Godzilla's new design; he felt that the "googly" eyes made Godzilla look silly but that the design was more "organic and menacing" than previous incarnations and praised the film's depiction of Godzilla, stating, "I really liked the way Godzilla is handled in this new movie, as it feels a lot more like the God Soldier short that both Anno and Higuchi worked on" and concluded by stating that he "really enjoyed" the film and that it had a "far more coherent plot" than 2014's Godzilla. Marcus Goh from Yahoo felt that the film was a better reimagining than 2014's Godzilla, though he criticized parts of Godzilla's design and the protagonists' plan to stop Godzilla. Goh gave the film a 3.1 score out of 5 and concluded that it "preserves the feel of Godzilla movies while updating it with modern responses". Jay Hawkinson from Bloody Disgusting called the film a "very good Godzilla movie that teeters on greatness". However, he felt the film's drama "didn't always work" and that some of the English delivery felt "canned and often corny", particularly from Ishihara's character. Hawkinson praised the film's battle-scenes, Shiro Sagisu's score, and the film's homages to the franchise, and concluded that "Shin Godzilla may be a reboot sans the rubber suit we've grown to love but it's unquestionably Godzilla". Guardian chief film critic Peter Bradshaw found Ishihara "slightly absurd" as an American "who bafflingly speaks English only with a strong and borderline unintelligible accent and comports herself with torpid model languor at all times".

Elizabeth Kerr from The Hollywood Reporter felt that Anno and Higuchi had done "the big guy justice" and "created a Godzilla for this era". While she felt that "all the telling (or reading) rather than showing reduces the story's overall impact" Kerr concluded that "there's an intangible quality to this Godzilla that Edwards (Emmerich doesn't count) never quite captured, and which is always welcome". Matt Schley from Otaku USA called the film "A match made in kaiju-heaven", and praised Anno's directing: "It's also a reminder, after years in the Evangelion reboot woods, that Anno is one of Japan's most unique directorial voices in either animation or live-action filmmaking." Though he felt the special effects weren't as impressive as 2014's Godzilla, Schley stated that the film's CG "gets the job done, though there are a couple questionable shots" and concluded by stating that "Hideaki Anno has achieved a successful resurgence for both the Big G and himself".

=== Accolades ===
Award nominations for Shin Godzilla
Award	Category	Recipient(s)	Result	Ref(s)
Fujimoto Awards	Fujimoto and Special Award	Akihiro Yamauchi and Yoshihiro Sato	Won	
40th Japan Academy Prize	Picture of the Year	Shin Godzilla	Won	
40th Japan Academy Prize	Director of the Year	Hideaki Anno and Shinji Higuchi	Won	
40th Japan Academy Prize	Actor of the Year	Hiroki Hasegawa	Nominated	
40th Japan Academy Prize	Supporting Actress of the Year	Satomi Ishihara	Nominated	
40th Japan Academy Prize	Supporting Actress of the Year	Mikako Ichikawa	Nominated	
40th Japan Academy Prize	Best Music	Shirou Sagisu	Nominated	
40th Japan Academy Prize	Best Cinematography	Kousuke Yamada	Won	
40th Japan Academy Prize	Best Art Direction	Yuji Hayashida and Eri Sakushima	Won	
40th Japan Academy Prize	Best Lighting Direction	Takayuki Kawabe	Won	
40th Japan Academy Prize	Best Sound Recording	Jun Nakamura and Haru Yamada	Won	
40th Japan Academy Prize	Best Film Editing	Hideaki Anno and Atsuki Satō	Won	
90th Kinema Junpo Awards	Best Film	Hideaki Anno and Shinji Higuchi	Nominated	
90th Kinema Junpo Awards	Best Screenplay	Hideaki Anno	Won	
59th Blue Ribbon Awards	Best Film	Shin Godzilla	Won	
38th Yokohama Film Festival	Special Grand Prize	Hideaki Anno	Won	
71st Mainichi Film Awards	Best Film	Shin Godzilla	Won	
71st Mainichi Film Awards	Best Supporting Actress	Mikako Ichikawa	Won	
71st Mainichi Film Awards	Best Art Direction	Yuji Hayashida and Eri Sakushima	Won	
11th Asian Film Awards	Best Visual Effects	Tetsuo Ohya	Won	
11th Asian Film Awards	Best Sound	Jun Nakamura	Nominated	
43rd Saturn Awards	Best International Film	Shin Godzilla	Nominated	
VFX-JAPAN Awards	Best Theatrical Live-Action Film	Atsuki Sato	Won	

== Post-release ==
=== Other films and potential sequel ===
In July 2017, while attending the American fan convention G-Fest, Higuchi confirmed that Toho could not produce another Godzilla film until after 2020. This was due to Toho's contract with Legendary Entertainment, who were producing their own Godzilla films, that restricts Toho from releasing their Godzilla films in the same year as Legendary's Godzilla films; Legendary released Godzilla: King of the Monsters in 2019, originally slated for 2018, and Godzilla vs. Kong in 2021, originally slated for 2020. At the time, Higuchi noted that Legendary's contract was effective until 2020. In May 2018, Toho announced that it would not make a sequel to Shin Godzilla, but expressed interest in a potential shared universe series, akin to the Marvel Cinematic Universe, featuring Toho's monsters.

Despite not producing a direct sequel, Toho released a trilogy of anime films: Godzilla: Planet of the Monsters (2017), Godzilla: City on the Edge of Battle (2018), and Godzilla: The Planet Eater (2018); an anime series, Godzilla Singular Point (2021); and another live-action film, Godzilla Minus One (2023).

In 2022, Hideaki Anno revealed that he wrote and submitted a proposal for a potential sequel, stating, "I wrote a proposal during the filming of Shin Godzilla on February 3, 2016, labeled Sequel Shin Godzilla Memo. The primary working title for the project was Shin Godzilla Raids Again (シン・ゴジラの逆襲, Shin Gojira no Gyakushu) and with the assumption that Mr. Higuchi would direct, it was meant to be something like a Toho Champion Festival kaiju showdown. Since it was concocted to be released in 2018, the shortest time possible for a domestic-made Godzilla film to be released, it was a rough draft for people who wouldn't like Shin Godzilla, an idea that wouldn't cost too much or take too long to create. I believed that it would be a bad idea to let it go to waste so I gave the proposal, draft, and visuals, as a gift to Mr. Higuchi and Toho, but since it was premature or whatever, among other reasons, after the film's release the discussion ended. While I did feel it was a waste, it's not something I could help since Toho decides what gets made."

In July 2025, Bloomberg News reported that a potential sequel to Shin Godzilla is amongst Toho's prospects. At San Diego Comic-Con the following month, many attendees were eager to ask Higuchi about a potential sequel, but such questions became prohibited midway through his press roundtable interviews. In an interview with The Direct, Higuchi seemed disinterested in a sequel, stating: "Well, I think if I were to make a sequel, then that's going to mean I'm going to have a lot more work, and I prefer to just come to Comic-Con, buy some toys, and play. So I don't know what kind of themes I would put into a sequel."

=== Collaborative projects ===
In 2016, Toho and Khara, Inc. collaborated on Godzilla vs. Evangelion, a cross-over line of merchandise uniting Shin Godzilla and Anno's Neon Genesis Evangelion. In May 2019, Universal Studios Japan opened the Godzilla vs. Evangelion: The Real 4D attraction. It ran until August 2019. In February 2022, Toho, Khara, Toei Company, and Tsuburaya Productions announced a collaborative project titled Shin Japan Heroes Universe for merchandise, special events and tie-ins. The project unites films that Anno had worked on that bear the katakana title "Shin" (シン): Shin Godzilla, Evangelion: 3.0+1.0 Thrice Upon a Time, (Note: The film was released in Japan as シン・エヴァンゲリオン劇場版: 𝄂 (Shin Evangelion Theatrical Edition: 𝄂)) Shin Ultraman and Shin Kamen Rider.

=== Public attractions ===
In 2017, Universal Studios Japan featured a temporary 4D Shin Godzilla attraction as part of its Universal Cool Japan 2017 program. In 2018, a statue of the film's version of Godzilla was erected in central Tokyo. The area was dubbed Hibiya Godzilla Square and is considered to be largest Godzilla statue in Japan, according to Toho. In October 2020, Nijigen no Mori opened a Shin Godzilla zip line attraction in Kobe, Japan.

== See also ==
- 2016 in science fiction
