= Travail (film) =

- DVD cover
- Directed by: Kentarō Ōtani
- Written by: Kentarō Ōtani
- Produced by: Osamu Kubota; Kiichi Mutō
- Starring: Asaka Seto; Shinya Tsukamoto; Mikako Ichikawa; Jun Murakami
- Cinematography: Kazuhiro Suzuki
- Edited by: Shuichi Kakesu
- Music by: Tadashi Ueda
- Production company: Travail Film Partners
- Distributed by: Amuse Pictures
- Release date: 23 March 2002 (Japan)
- Running time: 118 minutes
- Country: Japan
- Language: Japanese

Travail (Japanese: とらばいゆ, Hepburn: Torabaiyu), also known as A Woman's Work, is a 2002 Japanese romantic comedy drama film about female professional shogi players directed by Kentarō Ōtani and starring Asaka Seto, Shinya Tsukamoto and Mikako Ichikawa. It was released on 23 March 2002.

== Cast ==
- Asaka Seto
- Shinya Tsukamoto
- Mikako Ichikawa
- Jun Murakami

== Reception ==
It was chosen as the 5th best film at the 24th Yokohama Film Festival.

Award	Date	Category	Recipients and nominees	Result
Yokohama Film Festival	2003	Best Screenplay	Kentarō Ōtani	Won
Yokohama Film Festival	2003	Best Actress	Asaka Seto	Won
Yokohama Film Festival	2003	Best Supporting Actor	Shinya Tsukamoto	Won
Yokohama Film Festival	2003	Best Newcomer	Mikako Ichikawa	Won
