= Mikako Ichikawa =

Japanese actress and model (born 1978)

- 市川 実日子
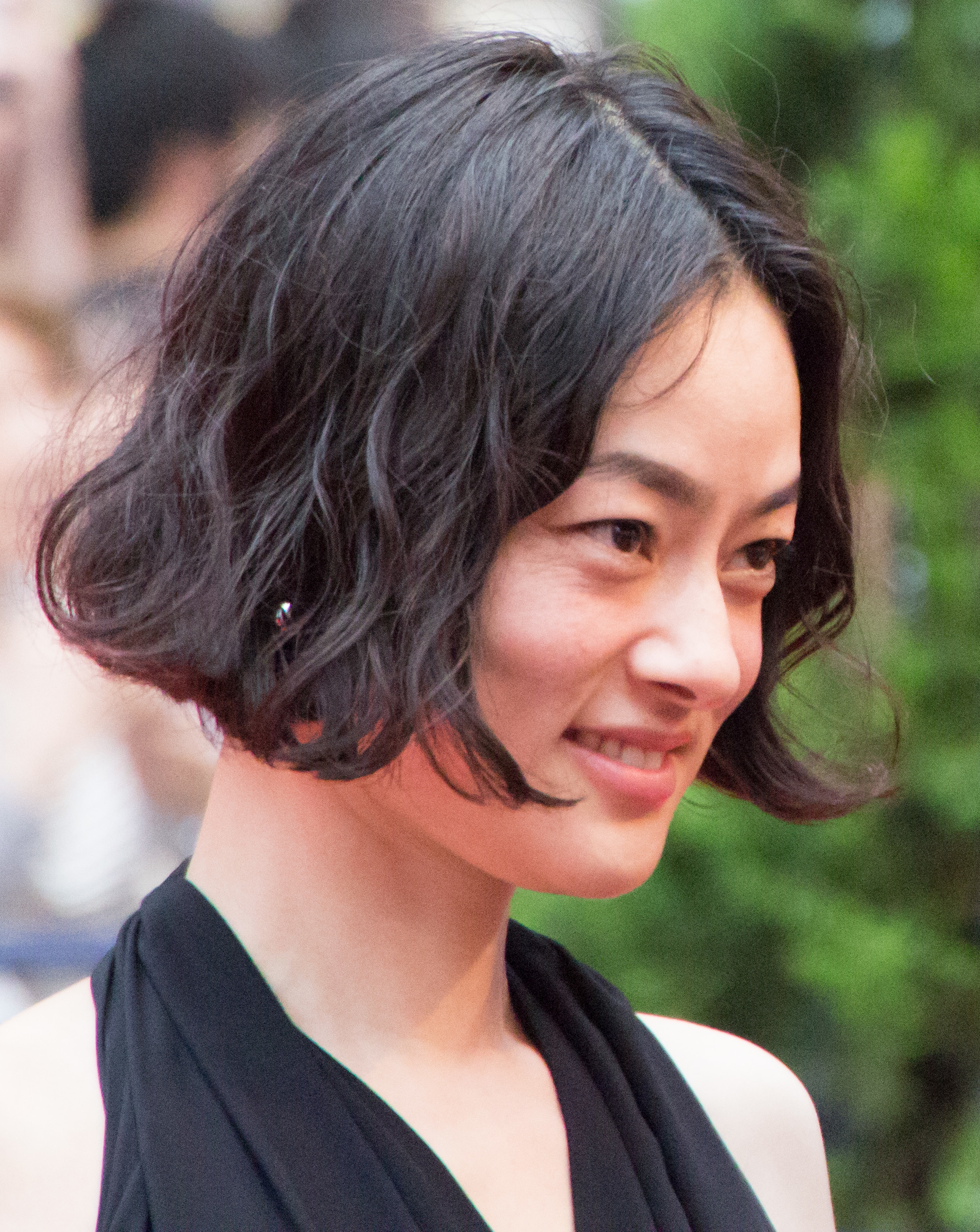
- Ichikawa at the Godzilla Resurgence World Premiere Red Carpet in July 2016
- Born: 13 June 1978 (age 48); Tokyo, Japan
- Occupations: Actress; model
- Years active: 1994–present
- Relatives: Miwako Ichikawa (sister)

Mikako Ichikawa (市川 実日子, Ichikawa Mikako; born 13 June 1978) is a Japanese actress and model born in Tokyo. She has appeared in films including Blue (2002), Cutie Honey (2004), Memories of Matsuko (2006) and Shin Godzilla (2016). Her older sister is the actress and model Miwako Ichikawa.

== Biography ==
Due to her older sister being in the modeling business, Ichikawa made several appearances in the fashion magazine Olive during her teens. She then became a model in 1994 under exclusive contract with the magazine. In 1998, she started modeling for other magazines such as CUTiE, spoon. and Zipper. She made her acting debut in the 1998 short film How To Jujutsu, directed by Takashi Homma. She has appeared in films including Blue (2002), Cutie Honey (2004), Memories of Matsuko (2006) and Shin Godzilla (2016). For her role in Blue she won the award for Best Actress at the 24th Moscow International Film Festival. She was given a Best New Talent award at the 2003 Yokohama Film Festival. Ichikawa's hobbies are photography and handicrafts.

== Filmography ==
=== Film ===
- Timeless Melody (2000) – Chikako
- Blue (2002) – Kayako Kirishima
- A Woman's Work (2002) – Rina
- Lovers' Kiss (2003) – Miki Ozaki
- Pretty Woman (2003)
- Cutie Honey (2004) – Natsuko Aki
- Be with You (2004) – Midori Nagase; Takumi's co-worker
- Animusu anima (2005) – Office lady
- Rampo Noir (2005) segment "Kagami jigoku"
- Memories of Matsuko (2006) – Kumi Kawajiri; Matsuko's sister
- Ten Dreamy Nights (2006) segment 'The 5th Night'
- Life Can Be So Wonderful (2007) – Kanoko
- Megane (2007)
- Kissho Tennyo (2007)
- Romantic Prelude (2009)
- Wandering Home (2010) – Asami Minato
- Mother Water (2010) – Hatsumi
- Rent-a-Cat (2012) – Sayoko
- Our Family (2014) – Kyōko
- A Living Promise (2016)
- Museum (2016)
- Shin Godzilla (2016) – Hiromi Ogashira
- The Tokyo Night Sky Is Always the Densest Shade of Blue (2017)
- The Third Murder (2017) – Shinohara
- Narratage (2017)
- Destiny: The Tale of Kamakura (2017)
- Hitsuji no Ki (2018) – Yasu Sakurakōji
- A Girl Missing (2019)
- Dad, Chibi is Gone (2019)
- The Voice of Sin (2020) – Ami
- Tang and Me (2022) – Sakurako
- Side by Side (2023) – Shiori
- Shin Kamen Rider (2023) – Ichiro's mother
- Last Mile (2024) – Yuko Shoji
- Route 29 (2024) – Rieko

=== Television ===
- The Great White Tower (2019), Natsumi Nosaka
- Atsuhime (2008), Narasaki Ryō
- Come Come Everybody (2021–22), Berry
- DCU: Deep Crime Unit (2022), Mako Kuroe
- The Hot Spot (2025), Kiyomi Endo

== Awards and nominations ==
Year	Award	Category	Work	Result	Ref.
2002	24th Moscow International Film Festival	Best Actress	Blue	Won	
2003	24th Yokohama Film Festival	Best New Talent	Travail	Won	
2017	40th Japan Academy Film Prize	Best Supporting Actress	Shin Godzilla	Nominated	
2017	71st Mainichi Film Awards	Best Supporting Actress	Shin Godzilla	Won	
2019	32nd Nikkan Sports Film Awards	Best Supporting Actress	A Girl Missing, Dad, Chibi is Gone	Won	
2020	74th Mainichi Film Awards	Best Supporting Actress	A Girl Missing	Nominated	
