= Atsuki Sato =

Japanese film director (born 1961)

Atsuki Satō
- 佐藤 敦紀
- Born: 1961 (age 64–65); Toyohashi, Aichi, Japan
- Other name: Atsunori Satō
- Education: Waseda University
- Occupations: Film director; visual effects supervisor; special effects director; film editor
- Years active: 1982–present

Atsuki Satō (佐藤 敦紀(あつき), Satō Atsuki; born 1961), sometimes erroneously identified in English as Atsunori Satō, is a Japanese film director, visual effects supervisor, special effects director, and film editor. He won the award for Best Film Editing at the 40th Japan Academy Prize for his work on Hideaki Anno and Shinji Higuchi's Shin Godzilla and was nominated for the Best Visual Effects accolade at the 16th Asian Film Awards for his work on Higuchi's Shin Ultraman.

== Life and career ==
Satō was born in 1961 in Toyohashi, Aichi, Japan. Satō lived in Numazu, Shizuoka Prefecture, Japan until the age of six. Satō stated that during his formative years, he indulged in biology and "always carried an illustrated insect book with me everywhere I went". His family often moved prefectures during his childhood because father worked for the Japanese National Railways. While he was in middle school, he enjoyed playing music and often rehearsed Beethoven's sonatas. In his third year of secondary school, he aimed to study music at a university's education department. However, Satō became interested in anime around the same time after watching Mobile Suit Gundam —which was airing during his third year of secondary school— and thus began to consider working on anime in Tokyo.

Since he could not get a career in anime in Tokyo immediately, Satō enrolled at Waseda University in 1980. He had the opportunity to attend Nihon University College of Art or Meiji University but instead choose to enter Waseda's night school, the Second Literature Department.

Satō started his career in anime in 1982, working at Studio Deen. He worked on the Urusei Yatsura anime and the second Perman anime where he was in charge of directing production assistants. In 1985, after working on Urusei Yatsura 3: Remember My Love, he left the anime industry and began a new job at a business in Nagoya. Shortly thereafter, Satō became interested in computer-generated imagery and studied it at a business school while temporary working at a post-production studio in Tokyo.

In 1988, Satō was employed by IMAGICA Lab. Inc. and worked in the company's special effects department. He remained in the department until 1992, when he became self-employed. Two years later (in 1994), he worked with his friend Shinji Higuchi, who meet Satō during his time at IMAGICA, on Gamera: Guardian of the Universe. Satō subsequently worked on the next two entries in the Gamera trilogy, creating the computer-generated missiles. Upon the completion of Gamera 2: Attack of Legion (1996), Satō began work on The Record of Garm War, a project that would eventually become Garm Wars: The Last Druid (2014), however, production on the project was halted in 1999. Thus, he and other crew members from The Record of Garm War moved to work on Gamera 3: Revenge of Iris (1999). Thereafter, he was employed by IMAGE Co., Ltd., working in their visual effects division Motor/lieZ.

In 2001, he worked on the digital effects for The Princess Blade and was credited as the Digital/CG supervisor on Shusuke Kaneko's Godzilla, Mothra and King Ghidorah: Giant Monsters All-Out Attack. The following year he worked on the visual effects of Kamen Rider Ryuki: Episode Final and Returner and edited the film Minimoni ja Movie: Okashi na Daibōken!. He would supervise the visual effects on Kamen Rider 555: Paradise Lost in 2003, and was credited under "others" in the films HAZAN and Kamen Rider Blade: Missing Ace in 2004. Two years later, he received a credit as the supervisor of visual effects for Motor/lieZ on She, the Ultimate Weapon. In 2009, he served as both the editor and visual effects creator for Mamoru Oshii's Assault Girls.

In 2012, he edited Kenji Kamiyama's anime film 009 Re:Cyborg. That same year, Satō reunited with his friend Higuchi on the films The Floating Castle and Giant God Warrior Appears in Tokyo, serving as visual effects supervisor for both films and editor on the latter. In 2013, he founded the visual effects studio TMA1. Two years later, he was credited as the editor on Oshii's Nowhere Girl and served as the visual effects supervisor on Higuchi's Attack on Titan. In 2016, Oshii's Garm Wars was released for which Satō served as the assistant director and won the award for Best Film Editing at the 40th Japan Academy Prize for his work as the editor on Hideaki Anno and Higuchi's Shin Godzilla.

In 2021, Satō made his directorial debut on the anime film The "Space Battleship Yamato" Era: The Choice in 2202. The following year, he was credited as visual effects supervisor on Higuchi's Shin Ultraman, for his work, Satō has been nominated for the Best Visual Effects award at the 16th Asian Film Awards. He has the same role in visual effects for Anno's Shin Kamen Rider, released in March 2023.

== Filmography ==
=== Film ===
Year	Film	Effects	Editor	Note(s)	Ref(s)
1985	Urusei Yatsura 3: Remember My Love	Unknown	Unknown	Assistant director	
1995	Gamera: Guardian of the Universe	CG missiles creator	No		
1995	Ghost in the Shell	Unknown position in CG	No		
1996	Gamera 2: Attack of Legion	CG missiles creator	No		
1996	Space Cargo Ship Remnant 6	Special effects director	No	With Shinji Higuchi	
1999	Gamera 3: Revenge of Iris	CG missiles creator	No		
2000	Sakuya	Visual effects	No		
2001	Avalon	Unknown	Unknown		
2001	The Princess Blade	Digital effects	No		
2001	Godzilla, Mothra and King Ghidorah: Giant Monsters All-Out Attack	Digital/CG supervisor	No		
2002	Kamen Rider Ryuki: Episode Final	Visual effects director	No		
2002	Returner	Visual effects	No		
2002	Minimoni ja Movie: Okashi na Daibōken!	No	Yes		
2003	Kamen Rider 555: Paradise Lost	Visual effects supervisor	No		
2004	HAZAN	Unknown	Unknown	Credited under "others"	
2004	Ghost in the Shell 2: Innocence	Unknown	Unknown		
2004	Kamen Rider Blade: Missing Ace	Unknown	Unknown	Credited under "others"	
2006	She, the Ultimate Weapon	Visual effects supervisor	No	Credited under Motor/lieZ	
2009	Assault Girls	Visual effects	Yes		
2010	Halo Legends	Unknown	Unknown		
2012	009 Re:Cyborg	No	Yes		
2012	The Floating Castle	Visual effects supervisor	No		
2012	Giant God Warrior Appears in Tokyo	Visual effects supervisor	Yes		
2015	Nowhere Girl	No	Yes		
2015	Attack on Titan	Visual effects supervisor	No		
2016	Garm Wars	No	No	Assistant director	
2016	Shin Godzilla	Visual effects supervisor	Yes		
2021	The "Space Battleship Yamato" Era: The Choice in 2202	No	No	Director	
2022	Shin Ultraman	Visual effects supervisor	No		
2023	Shin Kamen Rider	Visual effects supervisor	No		
2025	Bullet Train Explosion	Visual effects supervisor	Yes		

=== Television ===
Year(s)	Series	Production assistant director	Note(s)	Ref(s)
1981–1986	Urusei Yatsura	Yes	Began working on the series in 1982	
1983–1985	Perman	Yes		

== Accolades ==
Award	Work(s)	Category	Note(s)	Result	Ref(s)
40th Japan Academy Film Prize	Shin Godzilla	Best Film Editing	With Hideaki Anno	Won	
16th Asian Film Awards	Shin Ultraman	Best Visual Effects		Nominated	
