= Narratage =

- DVD cover
- Directed by: Isao Yukisada
- Written by: Anne Horiizumi
- Based on: "Narratage" by Rio Shimamoto
- Produced by: Shinji Ogawa; Shunsuke Koga
- Starring: Jun Matsumoto; Kasumi Arimura; Kentaro Sakaguchi; Ayaka Onishi; Yutaro Furutachi; Miki Kamioka; Ryosuke Komakine; Daichi Kaneko; Mikako Ichikawa; Kōji Seto
- Cinematography: Jun Fukumoto
- Edited by: Tsuyoshi Imai
- Music by: Yōko Kumagai; Hidehiko Urayama
- Production companies: Pan Entertainment; Twenty Twenty Vision
- Release date: 7 October 2017 (Japan)
- Running time: 140 minutes
- Country: Japan
- Language: Japanese

Narratage (Japanese: ナラタージュ) is a 2017 Japanese romantic drama film directed by Isao Yukisada, starring Jun Matsumoto, Kasumi Arimura, Kentaro Sakaguchi, Ayaka Onishi, Yutaro Furutachi, Miki Kamioka, Ryosuke Komakine, Daichi Kaneko, Mikako Ichikawa and Kōji Seto. It is an adaptation of the Rio Shimamoto novel Narratage.

== Cast ==
- Jun Matsumoto as Takashi Hayama
- Kasumi Arimura as Izumi Kudo
- Kentaro Sakaguchi as Reiji Ono
- Ayaka Onishi as Shio Yamada
- Yutaro Furutachi as Hirofumi Kurokawa
- Miki Kamioka as Yuzuko Tsukamoto
- Ryosuke Komakine as Iori Kaneda
- Daichi Kaneko as Kei Shindo
- Mikako Ichikawa as Mizuki Hayama
- Kōji Seto as Keita Miyazawa

== Release ==
It was released in theatres in Japan on 7 October 2017.

== Reception ==
Guy Lodge of Variety wrote that while the film is "fully in touch with its very real emotions", it "feels just a little more than it says."

Edmund Lee of the South China Morning Post rated the film 2.5 stars out of 5 and wrote that "for all its finer accomplishments, Yukisada’s effort has probably stepped too far out of the line of ethics to find an agreeable audience."

Elizabeth Kerr of The Hollywood Reporter wrote that the film is a "mess on the storytelling front" and that it "basks in shameless sentimentality".
