= A Girl Missing =

2019 film by Kōji Fukada

- Theatrical release poster
- Kanji: よこがお
- Revised Hepburn: Yokogao
- Directed by: Kōji Fukada
- Written by: Kōji Fukada
- Produced by: Kazumasa Yonemitsu; Naohiko Ninomiya; Daisuke Futagi; Hirohisa Mukuju
- Starring: Mariko Tsutsui; Mikako Ichikawa
- Cinematography: Kenichi Negishi
- Edited by: Kōji Fukada; Julia Gregory
- Music by: Hiroyuki Onogawa
- Production companies: Kadokawa Daiei Studio; Tokyo Garage; Comme des Cinémas
- Distributed by: Kadokawa
- Release date: 26 July 2019 (Japan)
- Running time: 111 minutes
- Countries: Japan; France
- Language: Japanese

A Girl Missing (Japanese: よこがお, Hepburn: Yokogao; lit. 'Side Profile') is a 2019 drama film written and directed by Kōji Fukada. It was entered into numerous international film festivals, including Locarno, Toronto, New York and Rotterdam.

== Plot ==
Home nurse Ichiko works for the Oishi family, where she is treated as a full member. In addition to nursing bedridden grandmother Tōko, she also helps daughters Motoko and Saki with their exams in her free time. One day, Saki, the younger sister, is abducted. When Saki is finally found by the police and the abductor turns out to be Ichiko's nephew, a media frenzy follows which slowly drives Ichiko into social isolation. Motoko, who over time has become a friend and confidante, first supports, but later denounces Ichiko, publicly giving away a secret from Ichiko's past which the trusting Ichiko had told her in private. Ichiko, forced to quit her job and left by her fiancé, develops a desire for revenge.

== Cast ==
- Mariko Tsutsui as Ichiko
- Mikako Ichikawa as Motoko Oishi
- Miyu Ozawa as Saki Oishi
- Sōsuke Ikematsu as Kazumichi Yoneda
- Ren Sudo as Tatsuo Suzuki, Ichiko's nephew
- Mitsuru Fukikoshi as Kenji Tozuka
- Nahoko Kawasumi as Yōko Oishi, the mother
- Hisako Ōkata as Tōko Oishi, the grandmother
- Kentez Asaka as Reporter
