= Sorry (2002 film) =

Sorry (ごめん)
- DVD cover
- Directed by: Shin Togashi
- Screenplay by: Kota Yamada
- Story by: Hiko Tanaka
- Produced by: Hiroyuki Fujikado; Satoshi Kono; Suguru Kubota; Haruhiko Yoshida; Shirō Sasaki
- Starring: Masahiro Hisano; Yukika Sakuratani; Shoichi Sato; Takuya Kurihara
- Cinematography: Shōgo Ueno
- Edited by: Akimasa Kawashima
- Music by: Yoshihide Otomo
- Production companies: Maimu Pro; Bandai Visual; Yomiuri Telecasting Corporation; Yes Visions Company; Office Shirous
- Release date: October 12, 2002 (Japan)
- Running time: 103 minutes
- Country: Japan
- Language: Japanese

Sorry (Japanese: ごめん) a.k.a. Gomen is a 2002 Japanese film by director Shin Togashi. It is a coming of age drama about the confusion of first love set in Kyoto and Osaka, Japan. It was the debut feature for many of the child actors, including the leads Masahiro Hisano (Sei) and Yukika Sakuratani (Nao), and the second film by director Togashi.

== Plot synopsis ==
Twelve-year-old Sei has hit puberty and is quickly becoming sexually aware, sometimes not as privately as he'd like; erections in school and other inopportune times plague him. He talks about it with his school friends, Kinta and Nyanko, in between their feuding over the affections of classmate Yumi, but can't figure out what to do about it.

On a day trip to Kyoto to visit his grandparents, Sei has a chance meeting with Nao, a strong-willed, dream-like girl, while waiting for service in a pickle shop. She quickly becomes the object of all of his thoughts and desires, but there is one small problem: he doesn't know her name or where she lives. He arranges another trip to Kyoto on the next weekend and finds out her name, Nao Uryu, from the owner of the pickle shop, and starts an investigation around town of all of the Uryu families. He finds her working in her father's coffee shop, but his hopes are crushed when he finds out she is a year older and already in junior high. Sei is undaunted, though, and visits the coffee shop again, this time having a long and telling conversation with Nao's father while she is out visiting her mother. Upon her return, Nao and Sei take a walk around Kyoto, seeing the sights and talking. Sei, who forgetfully left his scarf in the coffee shop, is lent Nao's pink scarf for the walk. He waits for the day when Nao has to come to Osaka for the day to trade scarves so he can let her in on his feelings, but at the same time a girl at school is planning to do the same to him.

== Cast ==
Actor	Role
Masahiro Hisano	Sei
Yukika Sakuratani	Nao
Shoichi Sato	Kinta
Takuya Kurihara	Nyanko
Jun Kunimura	Sei's Father
Michiko Kawai	Sei's Mother
Ayumu Saitō	Nao's Father

== Critical reception ==
The film has not had a North American or European release, and as such has no Rotten Tomatoes or Metacritic score. Midnight Eye, a Japanese film webzine, remarked that the film was "a low-key yet surprisingly charming drama that remained strangely overlooked by both foreign festivals and critics during its initial release," going on to say "despite the occasionally close-to-the-bone belly laughs, both the humour and the situations are sure to prompt sniggers of recognition with foreign audiences of all ages." Midnight Eye also noted "the only problem ... is that of pacing, with several scenes left to play slightly longer than they should."

== Awards ==
- 2002 Yokohama Film Festival - Festival Prize, Best New Talent: Masahiro Hisano
- 2002 Yokohama Film Festival - Festival Prize, Best New Talent: Yukika Sakuratani
