= Asaka Seto =

Japanese actress (born 1976)

- Born: Megumi Ieda; December 12, 1976 (age 49); Seto, Japan
- Occupation: Actress
- Years active: 1983–1990, 1992–present
- Spouse: Yoshihiko Inohara (m. 2007)
- Children: 2

Asaka Seto (瀬戸 朝香, Seto Asaka) also known as Megumi Ieda, is a Japanese actress who works at Foster Management. She won the award for Best Actress at the 24th Yokohama Film Festival for Travail. She is married to Yoshihiko Inohara of the band V6.

== Filmography ==
=== Television ===
- Subarashiki kana jinsei (Fuji TV, 1993)
- Mou namida wa misenai (Fuji TV, 1993)
- Sweet Home (TBS, 1994)
- Kimi to ita natsu (Fuji TV, 1994)
- Tokyo daigaku monogatari (TV Asahi, 1994)
- Owaranai natsu (NTV, 1995)
- Miss Diamond (Fuji TV, 1995)
- Age 35 koishikute (Fuji TV, 1996)
- Boku ga boku de aru tame ni (Fuji TV, 1997)
- Tomodachi no Koibito (TBS, 1997)
- Narita Rikon (Fuji TV, 1997)
- Kamisan nanka kowakunai (TBS, 1998)
- Boy Hunt (Fuji TV, 1998)
- Naniwa Kinyudo 4 (Fuji TV, 1998)
- P.S. Genki desu, Shunpei (TBS, 1999)
- Saimin (TBS, 2000)
- Sayonara, Ozu Sensei (Fuji TV, 2001)
- Mayonaka wa Betsu no Kao (NHK, 2002)
- Kaidan Hyaku Monogatari Story 11 (Fuji TV, 2002)
- Toshiie and Matsu (NHK, 2002) – Yodo-dono
- Netsuretsu Teki Chuuka Hanten (Fuji TV, 2003)
- Tengoku no Daisuke e (NTV, 2003)
- Shin Yonige-ya Honpo (NTV, 2003)
- Ooku Dai-ishou (Fuji TV, 2004)
- Rikon Bengoshi 2 (Fuji TV, 2005)
- Nyokei Kazoku (TBS, 2005)
- Konya Hitori no Bed de (2005)
- Life (Fuji TV, 2007)
- Hachimitsu to Clover (Fuji TV, 2008)
- Yume wo Kanaeru Zo (YTV, 2008)
- Hana no Hokori (NHK, 2008)
- Choshokutei (Wowow, 2009)
- Tonari no Shibafu (TBS, 2009)
- Tokyo Airport: Air Traffic Controller (Fuji TV, 2012)

=== Film ===
- Wangan Bad Boy Blue (1992)
- Nozokiya (1995)
- Sharan-Q no enka no hanamichi (1997)
- Bullets of Love (2001)
- Travail (2002)
- One Missed Call 2 (2005)
- 2/2 (2005)
- Death Note (2006) (Naomi Misora)
- I Just Didn't Do It (2006)
- Kaidan (2007)
- L: Change the World (2008) (Naomi Misora)
- Isoroku (2011)
- Jōkyō Monogatari (2013)
- Seishun Gestalt Houkai (2025), Kanano Amemura

=== Dubbing ===
==== Live-action ====
- Hitch, Sara Melas (Eva Mendes)

==== Animation ====
- The Little Prince, the Mother
