= Hibiya Godzilla Square =

Square in Tokyo, Japan

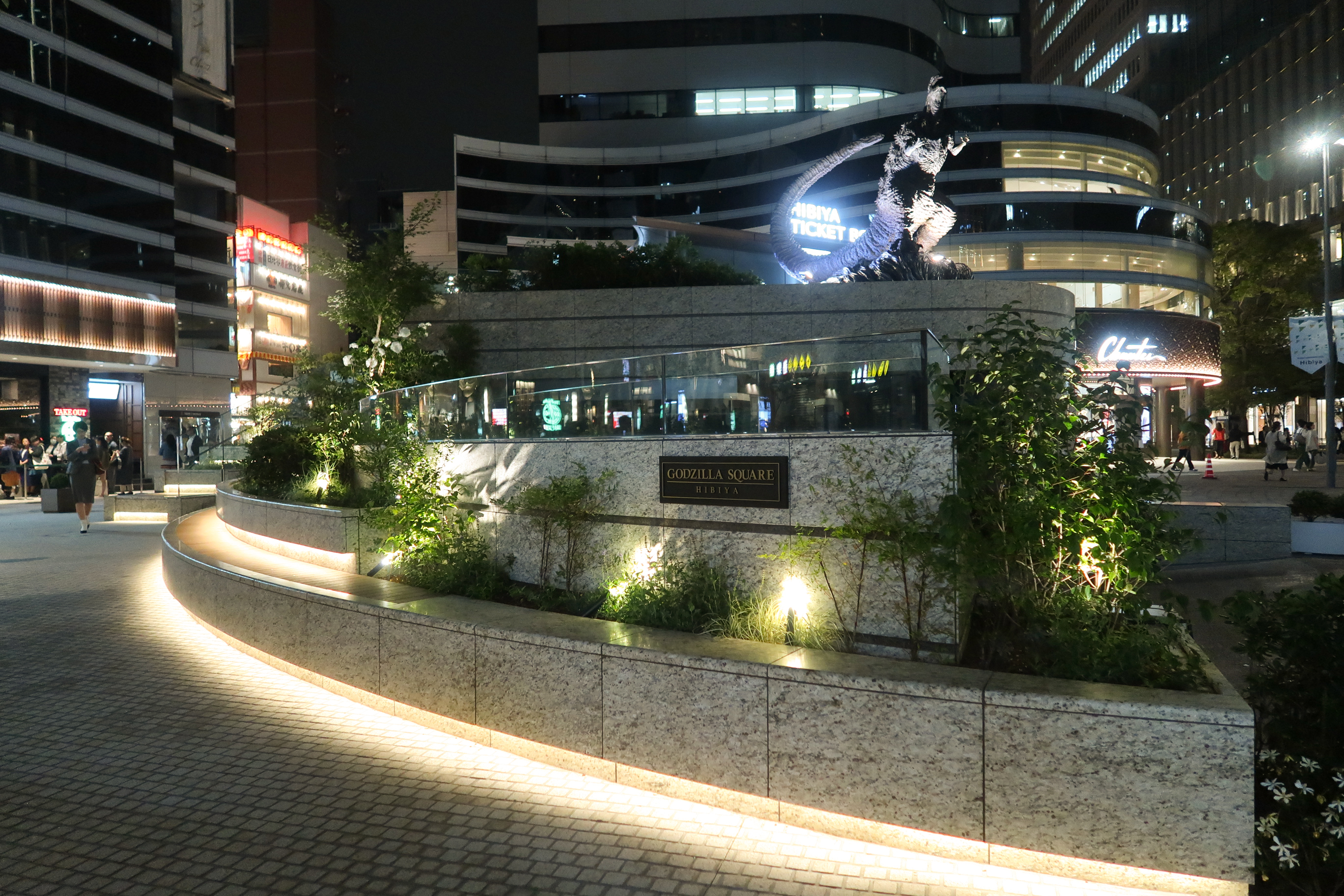
- The square in 2018
- Type: Square
- Location: Tokyo

Hibiya Godzilla Square (日比谷ゴジラスクエア, Hibiya Gojira Sukuea) is a square in Tokyo, Japan.

It features the largest statue of Godzilla in the country, based on the Shin Godzilla design of the character, with an original screenplay for the 1954 film being contained within the base. The current statue replaces another of Godzilla, based on the Heisei design that was commissioned in 1995 as a memorial for the character's death in the film Godzilla vs. Destoroyah, which was relocated to Toho Cinemas Hibiya in 2018.

The square is in between the Toho Cinemas office building and Hibiya Chanter shopping mall. It is also near Yurakucho Marion (previously The Nippon Theatre) which was destroyed by Godzilla in its 1954 and 1984 films.

The statue, including its platform, stands at 3 metres (9.8 ft) high. A plaque at the square reads (in Japanese) "The human race must coexist with Godzilla", a quote from the 2016 film.
