= Giant God Warrior Appears in Tokyo =

2012 film by Shinji Higuchi

- Film poster
- Kanji: 巨神兵東京に現わる
- Revised Hepburn: Kyoshinhei Tōkyō ni arawaru
- Directed by: Shinji Higuchi
- Screenplay by: Hideaki Anno
- Monologue by: Ōtarō Maijō
- Produced by: Hideaki Anno; Toshio Suzuki
- Narrated by: Megumi Hayashibara
- Cinematography: Keiichi Sakurai; Keizo Suzuki
- Edited by: Atsuki Sato; Hidemi Ri (theatrical version)
- Music by: Taisei Iwasaki
- Production companies: Studio Ghibli; Special Effects Laboratory Co., Ltd; Khara, Inc.
- Release date: July 10, 2012
- Running time: 9 minutes 10 minutes (theatrical version)
- Country: Japan
- Language: Japanese

Giant God Warrior Appears in Tokyo (Japanese: 巨神兵東京に現わる, Hepburn: Kyoshinhei Tōkyō ni Arawaru) is a 2012 Japanese kaiju short film directed by Shinji Higuchi. A live-action prequel and spin-off of Hayao Miyazaki's 1984 anime film Nausicaä of the Valley of the Wind, the film is a co-production between Studio Ghibli, Special Effects Laboratory Co., Ltd, and Khara, Inc. In the film, a woman from Tokyo recounts how her city was obliterated within hours by giant divine warriors.

== Plot ==
As mysterious orange spores appear in Tokyo, an unnamed female resident of the city receives a strange visit from her brother who tells her that the city will be destroyed tomorrow and she should leave beforehand. Due to her belief that it is merely a rumor on the internet, she dismisses his warning and does not inform her fellow city residents of the supposed danger.

The following day, the orange spores combine over Tokyo to form a gigantic humanoid entity - the titular Giant God Warrior - who hovers motionless in the sky. As the being descends upon the city, it shrinks to the size of a large building. After observing its surroundings, the warrior opens its mouth to reveal a weapon that shoots red bullets and a purple laser beam called the proton beam. A direct opposite of the Genesis creation narrative is displayed on-screen as the city is destroyed. Amidst a city-wide firestorm in the ruins of Tokyo, a group of God Warriors are seen carrying glowing spear-like weapons, walking through the flames.

Following this event, the warriors launched an event known as Seven Days of Fire, which destroyed most of the human civilization on Earth and recreated the planet's ecosystem. (Note: As depicted in Hayao Miyazaki's 1982 manga Nausicaä of the Valley of the Wind and its 1984 eponymous film adaptation.)

== Production ==
The film was the only Studio Ghibli's live-action production aside from Takahata's The Story of Yanagawa's Canals and features exclusive use of digital composition techniques and special effects technology. Some of the miniatures used in the film were previously constructed, used, and stored at Toho Studios, Marbling Fine Arts, and Special Effects Laboratory Co., Ltd.

The design of the film's giant creature was provided by Hayao Miyazaki, from his manga series Nausicaä of the Valley of the Wind. The director of the film was Higuchi Shinji, known for working on Neon Genesis Evangelion. The film was made for a gallery exhibit highlighting Hideaki Anno, who animated the God Warriors in the film Nausicaä of the Valley of the Wind. The production included no CGI, instead using minatures with the goal of emulating Kaiju films.

== Release ==
Giant God Warrior Appears in Tokyo received a theatrical release in Japan on November 17, 2012, preceding Evangelion: 3.0 You Can (Not) Redo. Director Shinji Higuchi decided to add new sound effects and give the Giant God Warriors new computer-generated wings in the final scene of the film for its theatrical release. For the theatrical release in Museum of Contemporary Art Tokyo as a part of Hideaki Anno's Tokusatsu Museum exhibition, the model of destroyed Tokyo Tower from Gamera: Guardian of the Universe, a kaiju film being one of landmark career of Higuchi, was on display.

== Reception ==
On February 23, 2013, the film received the VFX-JAPAN Award for CM, Hakuten Video Division. It has been discussed among writers who enjoy the Kaiju genre, having been seen as a new direction for Ghibli. The film was also noted as being a collaboration between prominent figures in the Kaiju and anime genre, as well as being the first live-action film by Studio Ghibli.
