= Nijigen no Mori =

Anime-themed amusement park in Japan

- Interactive map of Nijigen no Mori
- Location: Awaji, Hyogo, Japan
- Coordinates: 34.575972°N 135.006861°E
- Status: Operating
- Opened: 15 July 2017
- Owner: The Pasona Group
- Operated by: Nijigen no Mori Co., Ltd.
- Theme: Anime and manga
- Website: Official website

Nijigen no Mori (ニジゲンノモリ, lit. "two-dimensional forest") is a theme park in Awaji, Hyōgo, Japan. It opened on July 15, 2017, and features attractions and activities based on several Japanese manga, anime and game franchises, including Naruto and Dragon Quest.

== History ==
Plans for a park to revitalize the area were first submitted to the Hyōgo prefectural government in 2013. The Pasona Group's plans for an anime and manga amuseument park to be constructed in Hyogo Prefectural Awajishima Park were chosen from these submissions.

Upon launch, the park featured attractions based on Yoshito Usui's Crayon Shin-chan and Osamu Tezuka's Phoenix. In 2018, the park added new attractions based on the Naruto and Boruto franchises.

In 2019, the park further announced a Godzilla expansion, building a life-sized Godzilla replica statue on its grounds. The statue's appearance is based on the version seen in Hideaki Anno's Shin Godzilla. The attraction was officially opened in October 2020.

In 2020, Dragon Quest-based attractions were further announced and officially opened in 2021.

== Areas and attractions ==
The park features a variety of attractions, including scene recreations, life-sized statues, mazes, and augmented reality (AR) photobooths. The park is divided into permanent sections based on different franchises, with limited time collaborations being held from time to time.

=== Crayon Shin-chan Adventure Park ===
The Crayon Shin-chan Adventure Park area features several zipline courses as well as displays of the series' characters and items. A total of 53 different Shin-chan statues are placed around the park. At night, this area becomes a night walk themed after Phoenix, using projection mapping technology to create a narrative for visitors to experience.

=== Naruto & Boruto Shinobizato ===
The Naruto & Boruto Ninja Village features a recreation of the Hokage Rock as well as statues of characters from the series. Visitors can walk through a themed maze and undergo ninja missions as well as use AR technology to photograph themselves doing ninjutsu.

=== Godzilla Interception Operation ===
In Godzilla Interception Operation, visitors can undergo various 'missions' to pacify Godzilla, whose imprisonment in the park is shown in a seven minute short film. These include various zipline courses into and around the Godzilla statue, shooting games, and AR mystery-solving games. A permanent Godzilla Museum is also on the premises.

=== Dragon Quest Island ===
The Dragon Quest Island area features an open-air RPG style of gameplay, where visitors can choose to play as various character classes that appear in the original game such as mages, thieves, warriors, or martial artists. Players travel through the themed area solving puzzles and fighting monsters with the help of an IC tag.

=== Limited time collaborations ===
The park has done limited time collaborations with attractions featuring characters and events from Demon Slayer, Spy × Family, Bleach, and Monster Hunter.

== Access ==
Nijigen no Mori and Hyogo Prefectural Awajishima Park in general can be accessed via the Kobe-Awaji-Naruto Expressway by car. It is around an hour away from Shin-Kōbe Station via express bus.
